= 2025–26 FK Železiarne Podbrezová season =

Podbrezová
2025–26 season
- Manager: Štefan Markulík
- Stadium: ZELPO Aréna
- Slovak First Football League: 6th
- Slovak Cup: Semi-finals
- Top goalscorer: League: Radek Šiler (13); All: Radek Šiler (18)
- Highest home attendance: 3,568 v Spartak Trnava (3 March 2026, Slovak Cup)
- Lowest home attendance: 426 v Žilina (11 April 2026, Slovak First Football League)
- Average home league attendance: 885
- Biggest win: 9–0 v Čebovce (Away, 27 August 2025, Slovak Cup)
- Biggest defeat: 1–5 v Žilina (Home, 11 April 2026, Slovak First Football League)
Home colours	Away colours	Third colours

The 2025–26 season was FK Železiarne Podbrezová's fourth consecutive season in the Slovak First Football League. In addition to the domestic league, Podbrezová participated in the Slovak Cup.

== Squad ==
Squad at end of season

Note: Flags indicate national team as defined under FIFA eligibility rules; some limited exceptions apply. Players may hold more than one non-FIFA nationality.

No.	Pos.	Nation	Player
3	DF	SVK	Filip Mielke
5	DF	SVN	René Lampreht
6	MF	SVK	Adrián Petic
7	FW	SVK	Roland Galčík
8	MF	CZE	Ondřej Deml
9	FW	CZE	Jakub Řehák
10	FW	CZE	Radek Šiler
11	MF	SVK	Matúš Marcin
13	MF	SVK	Vincent Chyla
14	MF	UKR	Maksym Khyminets
15	DF	SVK	René Paraj
17	MF	CZE	Patrik Filippov
18	FW	MNE	Balša Mrvaljević

No.	Pos.	Nation	Player
19	FW	GAM	Ousman Kujabi
21	FW	GEO	Luka Silagadze
22	DF	SVK	Alex Lajčiak
23	MF	ARM	Davit Hakobyan
25	MF	SVK	Šimon Faško
26	MF	SVK	Samuel Štefánik
27	MF	NGA	Ridwan Sanusi (on loan from Žilina)
37	DF	SVK	Jakub Luka
44	MF	UKR	Andriy Havrylenko
70	GK	SVK	Lukáš Domanisky
77	MF	SVK	Peter Kováčik
80	MF	EST	Kevor Palumets
95	GK	SVK	Matej Jurička

== Transfers ==
=== Summer ===
In: Note: Flags indicate national team as defined under FIFA eligibility rules; some limited exceptions apply. Players may hold more than one non-FIFA nationality.

No.	Pos.	Nation	Player
—	FW	SVK	Matúš Marcin (from MFK Zemplin Michalovce)
—	FW	CZE	Radek Šiler (from AC Sparta Prague B)
—	DF	SVK	Branislav Niňaj (from (Romania) Sepsi OSK)

Out: Note: Flags indicate national team as defined under FIFA eligibility rules; some limited exceptions apply. Players may hold more than one non-FIFA nationality.

No.	Pos.	Nation	Player
—	GK	SVK	Pavol Bajza (to Tatran Prešov)
—	FW	GAM	Alasana Yirajang (to ŠK Slovan Bratislava)
—	DF	SVK	Kristián Koštrna (to FC Spartak Trnava)
28	GK	SVK	Adam Danko (to (Denmark) Kolding IF)
—	MF	SVK	Matej Grešák (Released)
9	FW	CZE	Daniel Smékal (to (Czech Republic) FK Pardubice)

=== Winter ===
In: Note: Flags indicate national team as defined under FIFA eligibility rules; some limited exceptions apply. Players may hold more than one non-FIFA nationality.

No.	Pos.	Nation	Player
—	FW	GEO	Luka Silagadze (from (Georgia (country)) FC Iberia 1999)
—	FW	MNE	Balša Mrvaljević (from (Montenegro) OFK Mladost Donja Gorica)
—	DF	SVN	Rene Lampreht (from (Slovenia) NK Domžale)

Out: Note: Flags indicate national team as defined under FIFA eligibility rules; some limited exceptions apply. Players may hold more than one non-FIFA nationality.

No.	Pos.	Nation	Player
—	DF	SVK	Branislav Niňaj (on loan to MFK Skalica)
—	DF	CTA	Séverin Tatolna (on loan to 1. FC Tatran Prešov)
—	DF	HUN	Alex Marković (to (Czech Republic) FC Zbrojovka Brno)

== Competitions ==
=== Overview ===
Competition	First match	Last match	Starting round	Final position	Record							
Competition	First match	Last match	Starting round	Final position	Pld	W	D	L	GF	GA	GD	Win %
Slovak First Football League	27 July 2025	16 May 2026	Matchday 1	6th	32	13	3	16	55	51	+4	40.63
Slovak Cup	27 August 2025	14 April 2026	Second round	Semi-finals	7	5	1	1	22	8	+14	71.43
Total					39	18	4	17	77	59	+18	46.15

Source: Competitions

=== Slovak First Football League ===
==== Regular season ====
===== League table =====
Pos	Team	Pld	W	D	L	GF	GA	GD	Pts	Qualification
2	DAC Dunajská Streda	22	12	7	3	39	20	+19	43	Qualification for the championship group
3	Žilina	22	11	7	4	45	27	+18	40	Qualification for the championship group
4	Spartak Trnava	22	11	4	7	35	28	+7	37	Qualification for the championship group
5	Podbrezová	22	11	3	8	46	29	+17	36	Qualification for the championship group
6	Zemplín Michalovce	22	8	5	9	32	36	−4	29	Qualification for the championship group
7	Ružomberok	22	6	7	9	24	34	−10	25	Qualification for the relegation group
8	Trenčín	22	7	3	12	18	37	−19	24 (Note: Ranked by head-to-head points: Trenčín 6, Košice 0.)	Qualification for the relegation group

Source: Niké liga (in Slovak)
Rules for classification: 1) Points; 2) Head-to-head points; 3) Head-to-head goal difference; 4) Head-to-head away goals scored; 5) Play-off.

===== Results summary =====
Overall								Home						Away					
Pld	W	D	L	GF	GA	GD	Pts	W	D	L	GF	GA	GD	W	D	L	GF	GA	GD
22	11	3	8	46	29	+17	36	7	1	3	24	12	+12	4	2	5	22	17	+5

Source: Niké liga

===== Results by round =====
Round	1	2	3	4	5	6	7	8	9	10	11	12	13	14	15	16	17	18	19	20	21	22
Ground	H	A	A	H	A	H	A	H	A	H	A	A	H	H	A	H	A	H	A	H	A	H
Result	W	L	D	W	L	D	L	W	L	L	D	W	L	W	L	W	W	L	W	W	W	W
Position	2	7	8	7	7	7	7	7	7	8	8	6	7	6	6	6	5	6	5	5	5	5
Points	3	3	4	7	7	8	8	11	11	11	12	15	15	18	18	21	24	24	27	30	33	36

Source: Worldfootball
A = Away; H = Home; W = Win; D = Draw; L = Loss

===== Matches =====
27 July 2025 1	Podbrezová	3–1	Košice	Podbrezová
17:00 CEST (UTC+2)	Mielke (yellow card) 9'; Havrylenko 41'; Smékal 54' (pen.); Kujabi 81'	Report	Magda (yellow card) 37'; Jakúbek 62'	Stadium: ZELPO Aréna; Attendance: 1,008; Referee: Michal Smolák; Assistant referees: Branislav Hancko, Andrej Hrmo

2 August 2025 2	Slovan Bratislava	4–1	Podbrezová	Bratislava
20:30 CEST (UTC+2)	Strelec 10'; Blackman (yellow card) 38'; Barseghyan 45+1' (pen.); Tolić (yellow card) 80'; Ibrahim 84'; Mak 90'	Report	Marcin 33'; Havrylenko (yellow card) 47'; Sallah (yellow card) 64'	Stadium: Tehelné pole Attendance: 6,436; Referee: Michal Očenáš; Assistant referees: Adam Jekkel, Simeon Vass

9 August 2025 3	Skalica	2–2	Podbrezová	Skalica
18:00 CEST (UTC+2)	Mášik (yellow card) 40'; Morong 56'; Smejka (yellow card) 62'; Švec 63'	Report	Šiler (yellow card) 21'; Deml 45+1'; Mielke (red card) 83'; Kujabi (yellow card) 87', (goal) 90+3'	Stadium: Mestský štadión Skalica; Attendance: 543; Referee: Boris Benedik; Assistant referees: Tomáš Straka, Patrik Kmec

16 August 2025 4	Podbrezová	2–1	Komárno	Podbrezová
18:00 CEST (UTC+2)	Smékal 5'; Deml 23'; Palumets (yellow card) 42'; Štefánik (yellow card) 84'	Report	Šmehyl 54'; Žák (yellow card) 63'	Stadium: ZELPO Aréna; Attendance: 865; Referee: Bálint Kišš; Assistant referees: Ákos Juhos, Matej Hrebeňár

24 August 2025 5	Žilina	3–0	Podbrezová	Žilina
19:00 CEST (UTC+2)	Faško 17' (pen.), 53'; Káčer 74'	Report	Bondarenko (yellow card) 70'; Niňaj (yellow card) 90'; Šiler (yellow card) 90+4'	Stadium: Štadión pod Dubňom; Attendance: 1,908; Referee: Jaroslav Sučka; Assistant referees: Milan Štrbo, Patrik Kmec

30 August 2025 6	Podbrezová	2–2	Zemplín Michalovce	Podbrezová
20:30 CEST (UTC+2)	Havrylenko 44'; Smékal 56'; Mielke (yellow card) 65'; Paraj (yellow card) 72'	Report	Paulauskas 26'; Ahl 53'; Brosnan (yellow card) 79'	Stadium: ZELPO Aréna; Attendance: 527; Referee: Lukáš Dzivjak; Assistant referees: Branislav Hancko, Matej Hrebeňár

14 September 2025 7	DAC Dunajská Streda	2–0	Podbrezová	Dunajská Streda
19:00 CEST (UTC+2)	Đukanović 9'; Redzic 30'; Méndez (yellow card) 34'; Gueye (yellow card) 90'	Report	Chyla (yellow card) 61'; Galčík (yellow card) 87'; Jurička (yellow card) 90'	Stadium: MOL Aréna; Attendance: 4,682; Referee: Ivan Kružliak; Assistant referees: Ján Pozor, Ákos Juhos

20 September 2025 8	Podbrezová	2–0	Trenčín	Podbrezová
18:00 CEST (UTC+2)	Galčík 3'; Paraj (yellow card) 53'; Šiler 60' (pen.), (yellow card) 62'; Niňaj (yellow card) 90+2'	Report	Hájovský (yellow card) 38'; Bagín (yellow card) 90+8'	Stadium: ZELPO Aréna; Attendance: 825; Referee: Igor Valent; Assistant referees: Ákos Juhos, Matej Zemko

28 September 2025 9	Ružomberok	1–0	Podbrezová	Ružomberok
17:00 CEST (UTC+2)	Fila (yellow card) 58'; Grygar (yellow card) 60'; Gomola (yellow card) 76'; Tučný 88'	Report	Luka (yellow card) 61'; Sanusi (yellow card) 72'	Stadium: Štadión pod Čebraťom; Attendance: 1,141; Referee: Martin Dohál; Assistant referees: Pavel Jánošík, Matej Hrebeňár

18 October 2025 11	Tatran Prešov	2–2	Podbrezová	Prešov
15:30 CEST (UTC+2)	Olejník 27'; Šimko (yellow card) 59'; Sipľak (yellow card) 67'; Morim (yellow card) 88'; Regáli 90+5'	Report	Galčík (yellow card) 49', (goal) 70'; Šiler 59' (pen.); Luka (yellow card) 65'; Deml (yellow card) 73'; Jurička (yellow card) 80'; Palumets (yellow card) 81'; Štefánik (yellow card) 88'	Stadium: Futbal Tatran Arena; Attendance: 6,098; Referee: Martin Dohál; Assistant referees: Adam Jekkel, Martin Vitko

25 October 2025 12	Košice	2–4	Podbrezová	Košice
18:00 CEST (UTC+2)	Kružliak 45'; Palacín 73'	Report	Galčík 28', 70'; Šiler 40'; Kováčik 58'; Havrylenko (yellow card) 90+2'	Stadium: Košická futbalová aréna Attendance: 2,234; Referee: Ivan Kružliak; Assistant referees: Branislav Hancko, Matej Zemko

1 November 2025 13	Podbrezová	1–3	Slovan Bratislava	Podbrezová
15:30 CET (UTC+1)	Šiler 5'; Sanusi (yellow card) 83'	Report	Mak 33'; Ofori 39'; Marcelli 45+2', (yellow card) 74'; Ibrahim (yellow card) 68'	Stadium: ZELPO Aréna; Attendance: 3,048; Referee: Peter Kráľovič; Assistant referees: Milan Štrbo, Tomáš Vorel

8 November 2025 14	Podbrezová	2–0	Skalica	Podbrezová
15:30 CET (UTC+1)	Marković 65'; Mielke (yellow card) 67'; Luka (yellow card) 71'; Kováčik 79'	Report	Podhorín (yellow card) 79'; Gaži (red card) 87'; Junas (yellow card) 90'	Stadium: ZELPO Aréna; Attendance: 502; Referee: Filip Malárik; Assistant referees: Peter Bednár, Juraj Halíček

22 November 2025 15	Komárno	1–0	Podbrezová	Zlaté Moravce
15:30 CET (UTC+1)	Šimko (yellow card) 72'; Kiss (yellow card) 78'; Pastorek (yellow card) 90+3'; Šmehyl 90+11' (pen.)	Report	Jurička (yellow card) 90+11'; Marković (yellow card) 90+12'	Stadium: ViOn Aréna; Attendance: 230; Referee: Igor Valent; Assistant referees: Ján Pozor, Matej Zemko

30 November 2025 16	Podbrezová	2–0	Žilina	Podbrezová
18:00 CET (UTC+1)	Chyla (yellow card) 39'; Šiler 48'; Štefánik 52'; Palumets (yellow card) 57'; Paraj (yellow card) 90'	Report	Káčer (yellow card) 66'	Stadium: ZELPO Aréna; Attendance: 557; Referee: Ivan Kružliak; Assistant referees: Tomáš Straka, Matej Hrebeňár

3 December 2025 10	Podbrezová	1–3	Spartak Trnava	Podbrezová
18:00 CET (UTC+1)	Niňaj (yellow card) 46'; Havrylenko (yellow card) 51'; Sanusi (yellow card) 55'; Luka (yellow card) 64'; Palumets 72'; Šiler (yellow card) 90'	Report	Khorkheli (yellow card) 44'; Kudlička 50', 81'; Metsoko 90'; Holík (yellow card) 90'; Twardzik (yellow card) 90'; Ďuriš (red card) 90'	Stadium: ZELPO Aréna; Attendance: 727; Referee: Bálint Kišš; Assistant referees: František Ferenc, Juraj Halíček

6 December 2025 17	Zemplín Michalovce	0–4	Podbrezová	Michalovce
15:30 CET (UTC+1)	Paulauskas (red card) 21'; Ramos (yellow card) 45'; Pauschek (yellow card) 62'	Report	Galčík 38', 90'; Havrylenko (yellow card) 45'; Luka (yellow card) 57'; Palumets 69', (yellow card) 78'; Šiler 80'; Paraj (yellow card) 81'	Stadium: Mestský futbalový štadión Attendance: 815; Referee: Marián Ruc; Assistant referees: Adam Jekkel, Tomáš Straka

13 December 2025 18	Podbrezová	0–1	DAC Dunajská Streda	Podbrezová
15:30 CET (UTC+1)	Paraj (yellow card) 24'	Report	Modesto (yellow card) 25'; Sylla 30'; Nemanič (yellow card) 62'	Stadium: ZELPO Aréna; Attendance: 511; Referee: Michal Smolák; Assistant referees: Branislav Hancko, Ján Pozor

7 February 2026 19	Trenčín	0–4	Podbrezová	Trenčín
15:30 CET (UTC+1)	Brandis (yellow card) 31'; Diouf (yellow card) 43'; Musaba (yellow card) 45'; Križan (yellow card) 79'	Report	Luka (yellow card) 11'; Šiler 15', 35', 45'; Lampreht 36'	Stadium: Štadión Sihoť; Attendance: 978; Referee: Lukáš Dzivjak; Assistant referees: Pavel Jánošík, Matej Hrebeňár

14 February 2026 20	Podbrezová	5–0	Ružomberok	Podbrezová
15:30 CET (UTC+1)	Lampreht 36'; Kováčik 45', (yellow card) 51'; Šiler 47', 77'; Palumets (yellow card) 60'; Chyla 73'	Report		Stadium: ZELPO Aréna; Attendance: 611; Referee: Martin Dohál; Assistant referees: Martin Vitko, Juraj Halíček

21 February 2026 21	Spartak Trnava	0–5	Podbrezová	Trnava
18:00 CET (UTC+1)	Jureškin (yellow card) 19'; Paur (yellow card) 39'	Report	Galčík 37'; Šiler 39', (yellow card) 39'; Luka 57'; Kováčik 89'; Paraj 90+3'	Stadium: Anton Malatinský Stadium; Attendance: 2,218; Referee: Filip Malárik; Assistant referees: Jakub Košecký, Mário Roszbeck

28 February 2026 22	Podbrezová	4–1	Tatran Prešov	Podbrezová
15:30 CET (UTC+1)	Silagadze 6' (pen.); Kujabi (yellow card) 19'; Kováčik 36'; Galčík 42' (pen.), (yellow card) 45'; Havrylenko (yellow card) 86'; Palumets 90'	Report	Bondarenko (yellow card) 41'; Olejník (yellow card) 45'; Regáli (yellow card) 59'; Sipľak 82' (pen.)	Stadium: ZELPO Aréna; Attendance: 1,467; Referee: Matej Choreň; Assistant referees: Peter Bednár, Matej Zemko

==== Championship group ====
===== League table =====
Pos	Team	Pld	W	D	L	GF	GA	GD	Pts	Qualification	SLO	DAC	TRN	ŽIL	ZMI	POD
1	Slovan Bratislava (C)	32	21	5	6	62	37	+25	68	Qualification for the Champions League second qualifying round (Note: Slovan Bratislava was promoted to the Champions League second qualifying round as one of the two champions with the highest coefficient in Champions League first qualifying round, via Champions League re-balancing.)	—	1–0	2–2	0–1	0–2	2–0
2	DAC Dunajská Streda	32	17	7	8	55	34	+21	58	Qualification for the Conference League second qualifying round	0–3	—	3–0	3–1	3–0	2–1
3	Spartak Trnava	32	17	5	10	51	37	+14	56	Qualification for the Conference League second qualifying round	0–1	2–1	—	1–0	3–0	4–1
4	Žilina	32	15	7	10	59	41	+18	52	Qualification for the Europa League first qualifying round (Note: Žilina qualified for the Europa League first qualifying round as the 2025–26 Slovak Cup winners.)	0–1	3–1	0–1	—	3–2	0–2
5	Zemplín Michalovce	32	13	5	14	44	52	−8	44		1–3	2–1	1–0	2–1	—	1–2
6	Podbrezová	32	13	3	16	55	51	+4	42		1–2	1–2	0–3	1–5	0–1	—

Source: Niké liga (in Slovak)
Rules for classification: 1) Points; 2) Points in regular season; 3) Head-to-head points in regular season; 4) Head-to-head goal difference in regular season; 5) Head-to-head goals scored in regular season; 6) Head-to-head away goals scored in regular season (if two teams tied); 7) Goal difference; 8) Goals scored; 9) Fair play ranking; 10) Drawing of lots.
(C) Champions

===== Results summary =====
Overall								Home						Away					
Pld	W	D	L	GF	GA	GD	Pts	W	D	L	GF	GA	GD	W	D	L	GF	GA	GD
10	2	0	8	9	22	−13	6	0	0	5	3	13	−10	2	0	3	6	9	−3

Source: Worldfootball

===== Results by round =====
Round	23	24	25	26	27	28	29	30	31	32
Ground	A	H	A	A	H	H	A	H	H	A
Result	L	L	L	L	L	L	W	L	L	W
Position	5	5	5	6	6	6	5	5	6	6
Points	36	36	36	36	36	36	39	39	39	42

Source: Worldfootball
A = Away; H = Home; W = Win; D = Draw; L = Loss

===== Matches =====
8 March 2026 23	DAC Dunajská Streda	2–1	Podbrezová	Dunajská Streda
18:00 CET (UTC+1)	Tuboly 12' (pen.); Mielke 76' (o.g.)	Report	Jurička (yellow card) 11'; Galčík 35'; Luka (yellow card) 44'; Paraj (yellow card) 78'; Štefánik (yellow card) 87'	Stadium: MOL Aréna; Attendance: 3,916; Referee: Peter Kráľovič; Assistant referees: Milan Štrbo, František Ferenc

14 March 2026 24	Podbrezová	0–1	Zemplín Michalovce	Podbrezová
15:30 CET (UTC+1)	Kováčik (yellow card) 30'; Lampreht (yellow card) 47'; Šiler (yellow card) 48'; Silagadze (yellow card) 75'	Report	Čurma (yellow card) 3'; Volanakis (yellow card) 26'; Park 69'; Bednár (yellow card) 75'	Stadium: ZELPO Aréna; Attendance: 737; Referee: Jaroslav Sučka; Assistant referees: Andrej Hrmo, Jakub Košecký

22 March 2026 25	Slovan Bratislava	2–0	Podbrezová	Bratislava
18:00 CET (UTC+1)	Šporar 29', 64'; Weiss (yellow card) 52'; Bajrić (yellow card) 56'	Report	Chyla (yellow card) 52'; Luka (yellow card) 85'; Šiler (yellow card) 90+3'	Stadium: Tehelné pole Attendance: 6,039; Referee: Bálint Kišš; Assistant referees: Tomáš Vorel, Pavel Jánošík

5 April 2026 26	Spartak Trnava	4–1	Podbrezová	Trnava
18:00 CEST (UTC+2)	Twardzik (yellow card) 29'; Paur (yellow card) 37'; Metsoko 45+1'; Mikovič (yellow card) 52'; Lampreht 70' (o.g.); Gong 79', 80'; Procházka (yellow card) 82'	Report	Galčík 20'; Lampreht (yellow card) 86'; Mrvaljević (yellow card) 90+1'	Stadium: Anton Malatinský Stadium; Attendance: 3,550; Referee: Marián Ruc; Assistant referees: Dušan Štofik, Matej Zemko

11 April 2026 27	Podbrezová	1–5	Žilina	Podbrezová
15:30 CEST (UTC+2)	Chyla (yellow card) 44'; Mrvaljević 52'; Khyminets (yellow card) 73'	Report	Narimanidze (yellow card) 27'; Florea (yellow card) 44'; Roginić 55', 87'; Homet 63'; Káčer 65'; Hranica 82'	Stadium: ZELPO Aréna; Attendance: 426; Referee: Peter Ziemba; Assistant referees: František Ferenc, Tobiáš Pacák

18 April 2026 28	Podbrezová	1–2	DAC Dunajská Streda	Podbrezová
15:30 CEST (UTC+2)	Paraj (yellow card) 13'; Chyla 32'	Report	Kacharaba (yellow card) 3'; Gueye 30'; Tuboly 41' (pen.); Blažek (yellow card) 69'; Diongue (yellow card) 81'; Kapanadze (yellow card) 83'; Gagua (yellow card) 90'	Stadium: ZELPO Aréna; Attendance: 459; Referee: Matej Choreň; Assistant referees: Dušan Štofik, Dávid Bobko

25 April 2026 29	Zemplín Michalovce	1–2	Podbrezová	Michalovce
18:00 CEST (UTC+2)	Volanakis (yellow card) 22', (goal) 47'; Kalemi (yellow card) 90'	Report	Galčík 15'; Silagadze (yellow card) 38'; Palumets (yellow card) 42'; Šiler 54'; Luka (yellow card) 83'	Stadium: Mestský futbalový štadión Attendance: 1,542; Referee: Boris Benedik; Assistant referees: Martin Vitko, Michal Železňák

3 May 2026 30	Podbrezová	0–3	Spartak Trnava	Podbrezová
19:00 CEST (UTC+2)	Paraj (yellow card) 11'; Silagadze (yellow card) 26'; Mielke (yellow card) 74'; Khyminets (yellow card) 83'	Report	Jureškin 12'; Sabo (yellow card) 35'; Azango 38'; Laušić (yellow card) 45'; Khorkheli 60'; Kratochvíl (yellow card) 83'	Stadium: ZELPO Aréna; Attendance: 627; Referee: Martin Dohál; Assistant referees: Peter Čajka, Pavel Jánošík

9 May 2026 31	Podbrezová	1–2	Slovan Bratislava	Podbrezová
18:00 CEST (UTC+2)	Kováčik 53'; Šiler (yellow card) 57'; Štefánik (yellow card) 58'	Report	Bajrić (yellow card) 57'; Barseghyan 68'; Janković 90+3' (pen.)	Stadium: ZELPO Aréna; Attendance: 1,267; Referee: Boris Benedik; Assistant referees: Dávid Bobko, Matej Hrebeňár

16 May 2026 32	Žilina	0–2	Podbrezová	Žilina
17:00 CEST (UTC+2)	Roginić (yellow card) 47'; Ďatko (yellow card) 87'	Report	Bari 6' (o.g.); Šiler (yellow card) 34'; Mrvaljević 43'; Luka (yellow card) 85'	Stadium: Štadión pod Dubňom; Attendance: 1,586; Referee: Martin Dohál; Assistant referees: Patrik Kmec, Matej Hrebeňár

=== Slovak Cup ===
27 August 2025 Second round	Čebovce	0–9	Podbrezová	Čebovce
17:00 CEST (UTC+2)		Report	Galčík 9'; Palumets 15'; Kujabi 19'; Hakobyan 23'; Lerint 41'; Šiler 55', 59', 87'; Havrylenko 61'	Attendance: 430; Referee: Maroš Libiak; Assistant referees: Daniel Poláček, Andrej Hrmo

24 September 2025 Third round	Podkonice	1–3	Podbrezová	Podkonice
15:30 CEST (UTC+2)	Turňa 79'	Report	Kujabi 33'; Hakobyan 49'; Petic 89'	Stadium: Štadión na Brodku; Attendance: 507; Referee: Boris Marhefka; Assistant referees: Adam Jekkel, Peter Čajka

21 October 2025 Fourth round	Humenné	1–2	Podbrezová	Humenné
14:30 CEST (UTC+2)	Lazár 38'; Streňo (yellow card) 58'; Horváth (yellow card) 61'; Petko (yellow card) 61'; Vasiľ (yellow card) 64'	Report	Paraj (yellow card) 37'; Kujabi 53'; Havrylenko (yellow card) 58'; Šiler 63', (yellow card) 64'; Luka (yellow card) 90'	Stadium: Štadión Humenné; Attendance: 660; Referee: Kristián Micheľ; Assistant referees: Marek Cisko, Patrik Adamčo

15 November 2025 Round of 16	Nitra	2–3	Podbrezová	Nitra
13:00 CET (UTC+1)	Pánsky 37'; Grác (yellow card) 39'; Sombat 64'; Baláž (yellow card) 67'; Šoky (yellow card) 84'	Report	Niňaj (yellow card) 36'; Galčík 42', 62'; Šiler (penalty missed) 54', (yellow card) 90+4'; Kováčik 56'; Sanusi (yellow card) 67'; Paraj (yellow card) 73'	Stadium: Štadión pod Zoborom; Attendance: 2,050; Referee: Matej Choreň; Assistant referees: Mário Roszbeck, Marek Farkaš; Fourth official: Andrej Chromý

3 March 2026 Quarter-finals	Podbrezová	4–1	Spartak Trnava	Podbrezová
18:00 CET (UTC+1)	Šiler (yellow card) 25'; Galčík 27'; Kováčik 51', 90'; Jurička (yellow card) 63'; Palumets 80'	Report	Luka 19' (o.g.); Stojsavljević (yellow card) 78'; Skrbo (yellow card) 85' (yellow-red card) 90'; Ďuriš (yellow card) 89'; Sabo (yellow card) 90'	Stadium: ZELPO Aréna; Attendance: 3,568; Referee: Bálint Kišš; Assistant referees: Tomáš Vorel, Martin Vitko; Fourth official: Marián Ruc

18 March 2026 Semi-finals First leg	Žilina	2–0	Podbrezová	Žilina
19:30 CET (UTC+1)	Roginić 18'; Minárik 41'; Bari (yellow card) 61'; Szánthó (yellow card) 80'	Report	Jurička (red card) 28'; Silagadze (yellow card) 45+4'; Paraj (yellow card) 79'; Domanisky (yellow card) 90+3'	Stadium: Štadión pod Dubňom; Attendance: 1,739; Referee: Marián Ruc; Assistant referees: Ján Pozor, Dušan Štofik; Fourth official: Matej Choreň

14 April 2026 Semi-finals Second leg	Podbrezová	1–1 (1–3 agg.)	Žilina	Podbrezová
18:00 CEST (UTC+2)	Šiler 21', (yellow card) 53'; Palumets (yellow card) 43'; Chyla (yellow card) 56'; Kováčik (yellow card) 66'	Report	Roginić 17'; Kaša (yellow card) 58'; Adang (yellow card) 72'; Badžgoň (yellow card) 84'; Praženica (yellow card) 89' (not on pitch); Ďatko (yellow card) 90+7'	Stadium: ZELPO Aréna; Attendance: 2,476; Referee: Michal Smolák; Assistant referees: Branislav Hancko, Ján Pozor; Fourth official: Bálint Kišš
Note: Žilina won 3–1 on aggregate.
