= 2024–25 FK Železiarne Podbrezová season =

Podbrezová
2024–25 season
- Chairman: (Slovakia) Július Kriváň
- Manager: (Slovakia) Štefan Markulík
- Stadium: ZELPO Aréna
- Slovak First Football League: 6th
- Slovak Cup: Round of 16
Home colours	Away colours	Third colours

The 2024-25 season was the 104th season in the history of FK Železiarne Podbrezová. During this season the club participated in the Slovak First Football League and Slovak Cup.

== Season ==
Podbrezová finished the 2024–25 season in 6th place in the title group with 37 points after 32 games. Since Spartak Trnava won the Slovak Cup and finished 3rd in the league, a play-off was held to decide the additional European spot. Podbrezová defeated FC Košice in the semi final on penalties, but lost 3–2 in the final against DAC Dunajska Streda.

== Current squad ==
As of 16 February, 2025 Note: Flags indicate national team as defined under FIFA eligibility rules; some limited exceptions apply. Players may hold more than one non-FIFA nationality.

No.	Pos.	Nation	Player
3	DF	SVK	Filip Mielke
4	DF	SVK	Matej Oravec
7	FW	SVK	Roland Galčík
8	MF	CZE	Ondřej Deml (on loan from Viktoria Plzeň)
9	FW	CZE	Daniel Smékal
10	FW	GAM	Alasana Yirajang
11	FW	ESP	Jorge Velasco
13	MF	SVK	Vincent Chyla
14	DF	SVK	Matej Grešák
15	MF	SVK	René Paraj
17	FW	SVK	Peter Juritka
18	DF	HUN	Alex Marković

No.	Pos.	Nation	Player
20	DF	SVK	Peter Kovacik (on loan from Como)
23	DF	SVK	Adrián Slávik
24	DF	SVK	Kristián Koštrna
25	MF	SVK	Šimon Faško
26	MF	SVK	Samuel Stefanik
28	GK	SVK	Adam Danko
37	DF	SVK	Jakub Luka
44	MF	UKR	Andriy Havrylenko
80	MF	EST	Kevor Palumets
91	GK	SVK	Pavol Bajza
95	GK	SVK	Matej Juricka
99	FW	CMR	Lionel Abate

For a list of transfers, see List of Slovak football transfers summer 2024 and List of Slovak football transfers winter 2024-25

=== Out on loan ===
Note: Flags indicate national team as defined under FIFA eligibility rules; some limited exceptions apply. Players may hold more than one non-FIFA nationality.

No.	Pos.	Nation	Player
—	DF	CZE	Daniel Macej (at (Slovakia) Pohronie until 30 June 2025)
—	MF	SVK	Jozef Špyrka (at (Slovakia) Komárno until 30 June 2025)

No.	Pos.	Nation	Player
—	MF	GAM	Yusupha Kambi (at (Slovakia) Pohronie until 30 June 2025)

== Slovak First Football League ==
=== League table ===
==== Regular stage ====
Pos	Team	Pld	W	D	L	GF	GA	GD	Pts	Qualification
2	Žilina	22	13	6	3	42	20	+22	45	Qualification for the championship group
3	Spartak Trnava	22	12	8	2	34	17	+17	44	Qualification for the championship group
4	DAC Dunajská Streda	22	8	8	6	32	22	+10	32	Qualification for the championship group
5	Podbrezová	22	7	9	6	31	29	+2	30	Qualification for the championship group
6	Košice	22	7	8	7	31	25	+6	29	Qualification for the championship group
7	Zemplín Michalovce	22	6	9	7	28	34	−6	27	Qualification for the relegation group
8	Komárno	22	6	4	12	24	38	−14	22	Qualification for the relegation group

Source: Niké liga (in Slovak)
Rules for classification: 1) Points; 2) Head-to-head points; 3) Head-to-head goal difference; 4) Head-to-head away goals scored; 5) Play-off.

==== Championship group ====
Pos	Team	Pld	W	D	L	GF	GA	GD	Pts	Qualification	SLO	ŽIL	TRN	DAC	KOŠ	POD
1	Slovan Bratislava (C, Q)	32	22	6	4	74	39	+35	72	Qualification for the Champions League second qualifying round (Note: Since already qualified Paris Saint-Germain won the Champions League, Slovan Bratislava was promoted to the Champions League second qualifying round as one of the two champions with the highest coefficient in Champions League qualifying.)	—	4–3	1–1	2–2	1–0	3–1
2	Žilina (Q)	32	15	9	8	55	40	+15	54	Qualification for the Conference League second qualifying round	0–5	—	2–1	0–1	0–0	0–0
3	Spartak Trnava (Q)	32	14	10	8	46	34	+12	52	Qualification for the Europa League first qualifying round	2–3	2–4	—	1–1	0–1	2–1
4	DAC Dunajská Streda (O)	32	13	12	7	48	34	+14	51	Qualification for the Conference League play-offs	2–1	3–1	1–0	—	3–2	1–1
5	Košice (Q)	32	11	11	10	45	38	+7	44	Qualification for the Conference League play-offs	2–3	3–2	2–1	2–2	—	1–1
6	Železiarne Podbrezová	32	8	13	11	40	43	−3	37	Qualification for the Conference League play-offs	1–3	1–1	1–2	2–0	0–1	—

Source: Niké liga (in Slovak)
Rules for classification: 1) Points; 2) Head-to-head points; 3) Head-to-head goal difference; 4) Head-to-head away goals scored; 5) Play-off.
(C) Champions; (O) Play-off winners; (Q) Qualified for the phase indicated

=== Results by round ===
Round	1	2	3	4	6	7	8	9	10	11	12	5	13	14	15	16	17	18	19	20	21	22
Ground	H	A	A	H	H	A	H	A	H	A	A	A	H	H	A	H	A	H	A	H	A	H
Result	D	L	L	W	D	L	W	D	L	W	D	L	L	D	W	D	W	W	D	W	D	D
Position	5	9	11	8	8	11	7	6	8	7	6	8	7	7	7	7	5	5	5	5	5	5

Updated to match(es) played on 1 March 2025. Source: worldfootball
A = Away; H = Home; W = Win; D = Draw; L = Loss

=== Matches ===
27 July 2024 1	Podbrezová	0 - 0	Žilina	Podbrezová
18:00 CEST	Mrva (yellow card) 39'; Koštrna (yellow card) 65'; Chyla (yellow card) 82'	Report	Ďuriš (yellow card) 46'	Stadium: ZELPO Aréna; Attendance: 1,467; Referee: (Slovakia) Martin Dohál

3 August 2024 2	Slovan Bratislava	1 - 0	Podbrezová	Bratislava
20:30 CEST	Tolić (yellow card) 57'; Mak (yellow card) 65'; Barseghyan 77' (pen.)	Report	Danko (yellow card) 65'; Kayode Saliman (yellow card) 77'	Stadium: Tehelné pole Attendance: 5,338; Referee: (Slovakia) Lukáš Dzivjak

10 August 2024 3	Košice	3 - 0	Podbrezová	Košice
20:30 CEST	Medved 5' 29'; Niarchos 38'; Krivák (yellow card) 64'; Jones (yellow card) 85'	Report		Stadium: Košická futbalová aréna Attendance: 3,152; Referee: (Slovakia) Peter Kráľovič

17 August 2024 4	Podbrezová	7 - 1	Skalica	Podbrezová
18:00 CEST	Galčík 27' 45+8'; Chyla (yellow card) 40'; Yirajang 45'; Filip Mielke (yellow card) 45+3'; Sanusi 52'; Štefánik (yellow card) 62'; Smékal 73'; Peter Juritka (yellow card) 87' (goal) 90+3' 90+5'	Report	Vlasko 63' (pen.); Mášik (yellow card) 74'; Ranko (yellow card) 90'	Stadium: ZELPO Aréna; Attendance: 867; Referee: (Slovakia) Lukáš Dzivjak

31 August 2024 6	Podbrezová	1 - 1	Dukla Banská Bystrica	Podbrezová
20:30 CEST	Záhumenský 65' (o.g.); Ďatko (yellow card) 88'	Report	Malec 30'; Ivan Mensah (yellow card) 70'; Willwéber (yellow card) 75'	Stadium: ZELPO Aréna; Attendance: 1,967; Referee: (Slovakia) Filip Glova

15 September 2024 7	Ružomberok	1 - 0	Podbrezová	Ružomberok
18:00 CEST	Hladík 37'; Selecký (red card) 60'; Luterán (yellow card) 85'; Gabriel (yellow card) 90+1'	Report	Faško (yellow card) 33'; Ďatko (yellow card) 74'; Oravec (yellow card) 77'; Koštrna (yellow card) 85' (yellow-red card) 90+2'	Stadium: Štadión pod Čebraťom; Attendance: 1,024; Referee: (Slovakia) Ivan Kružliak

22 September 2024 8	Podbrezová	4 - 1	Michalovce	Podbrezová
18:00 CEST	Yirajang 15'; Ďatko 44'; Galčík 56'; Paraj (yellow card) 80'; Depetris 88' (pen.)	Report	Bahi (yellow card) 14'; Dzotsenidze (yellow card) 45+1' (yellow-red card) 55'; Marcin 46'; Lukáč (yellow card) 55'; Kyziridis (yellow card) 58'; Lukáš Šimko (yellow card) 86'	Stadium: ZELPO Aréna; Attendance: 1,127; Referee: (Slovakia) Lukáš Dzivjak

28 September 2024 9	Trenčín	1 - 1	Podbrezová	Trenčín
18:00 CEST	Ibrahim (yellow card) 11'; Bright Donkor 46'; Luka Zorić (yellow card) 90'; Emeka (yellow card) 90+1'	Report	Galčík (yellow card) 37'; Sanusi 41'; Slávik (yellow card) 60'	Stadium: Štadión Sihoť; Attendance: 1,078; Referee: (Slovakia) Michal Očenáš

5 October 2024 10	Podbrezová	0 - 4	Spartak Trnava	Podbrezová
18:00 CET	Paraj (yellow card) 22'	Report	Ofori 45+1' 55'; Ďuriš (yellow card) 50'; Sabo (yellow card) 61'; Daniel 66'; Šulek (yellow card) 67'; Pich 90+5'	Stadium: ZELPO Aréna; Attendance: 1,267; Referee: (Slovakia) Ivan Kružliak

20 October 2024 11	Komárno	1 - 2	Podbrezová	Zlaté Moravce
15:30 CET	Dominik Žák (yellow card) 12' (goal) 78'; Špiriak (yellow card) 56'; Ožvolda (yellow card) 63'; Tamás Németh (yellow card) 90+4'	Report	Yirajang 27'; Faško (yellow card) 40'; Paraj (yellow card) 44'; Galčík 85' (yellow card) 86'	Stadium: ViOn Aréna; Attendance: 420; Referee: (Slovakia) Filip Glova

26 October 2024 12	Žilina	2 - 2	Podbrezová	Žilina
15:30 CET	Sauer 31'; Iľko 85'	Report	Smékal 15'; Depetris 90+2' (yellow card) 90+3'	Stadium: Štadión pod Dubňom; Attendance: 1,982; Referee: (Slovakia) Peter Kráľovič

29 October 2024 5	DAC 1904	3 - 0	Podbrezová	Dunajská Streda
18:00 CET	Alex Méndez (yellow card) 8' (goal) 55'; Almási 20'; Tuboly (yellow card) 27'; Ortiz (yellow card) 45+3'; Vitális 62'	Report	Slávik (yellow card) 37'; Paraj (yellow card) 67'; Peter Juritka (yellow card) 77'	Stadium: DAC Aréna; Attendance: 2,535; Referee: (Slovakia) Ivan Kružliak

== Slovak Cup ==
28 August 2024 Second Round	TJ Tatran Chlebnice	0 - 8	Podbrezová
17:00		Report	Smékal 11' 70'; Ďatko 28' 39'; Ondřej Deml 34'; Kayode Saliman 50'; Štefánik 61'; Yirajang 86'

10 September 2024 Third Round	ŠK Olympia Bobrov	0 - 9	Podbrezová
16:00		Report	Peter Juritka 32'; Talakov 36' 47'; Galčík 37'; Ďatko 41' 51'; Yirajang 54'; Smékal 66' 69'

16 October 2024 Fourth Round	Púchov	0 - 2	Podbrezová	Púchov
15:00	Matej Obšivan (yellow card) 43'	Report	Paraj (yellow card) 5'; Galčík 16'; Peter Juritka 76'	Stadium: Mestský štadión Púchov; Attendance: 670; Referee: (Slovakia) Filip Malarik
