= 2024–25 FC DAC 1904 Dunajská Streda season =

FC DAC 1904 Dunajská Streda
2024–25 season
- Manager: Xisco Muñoz
- Stadium: MOL Aréna
- Slovak First Football League: 4th
- Slovak Cup: Round of 16
- UEFA Conference League: Second qualifying round
- Top goalscorer: League: Matej Trusa (7); All: Matej Trusa (12)

The 2024–25 season will be the 121st season in the history of FC DAC 1904 Dunajská Streda, and the 12th consecutive season in Slovak First Football League. In addition to the domestic league, the team is scheduled to participate in the Slovak Cup and the UEFA Conference League.

== Transfers ==
=== In ===
Pos.	Player	Transferred from	Fee	Date	Source
FW	(Hungary) Damir Redzic	(Hungary) Ferencvárosi TC II	Undisclosed	3 July 2024	
FW	(Slovakia) Ladislav Almási	(Czech Republic) Baník Ostrava	Loan	3 July 2024	
MF	(The Gambia) Mahmudu Bajo	(Slovakia) Železiarne Podbrezová	Undisclosed	18 July 2024	

=== Out ===
Pos.	Player	Transferred to	Fee	Date	Source
FW	(Greece) Giannis Niarchos	(Slovakia) FC Košice	Loan	19 July 2024	
MF	(Slovakia) Miroslav Káčer	(Slovakia) MŠK Žilina	Undisclosed	22 July 2024	

== Friendlies ==
=== Pre-season ===
29 June 2024 Friendly	Austria Wien	0–0	(Slovakia) DAC Dunajská Streda	Vienna
17:00				Stadium: Generali Arena

6 July 2024 Friendly	DAC Dunajská Streda (Slovakia)	1–4	(Czech Republic) MFK Vyškov
10:30	Tuboly 38'		Zajic 61'; Egbri 79', 116'; Mbonu 82'
Note: 2 x 60 minutes

12 July 2024 Friendly	DAC Dunajská Streda (Slovakia)	2–1	(Hungary) Győr
10:00	Redzic 43'; Bősze 83'		Bumba 70'

18 July 2024 Friendly	DAC Dunajská Streda (Slovakia)	3–2	(Croatia) NK Osijek
18:00	7'; 74'; 90'		25'; 78'

7 September 2024 Friendly	DAC Dunajská Streda (Slovakia)	4–1	(Hungary) Győri ETO	Dunajská Streda
11:00 CET		Report		Stadium: DAC Academy

12 October 2024 Friendly	Győri ETO (Hungary)	1–3	DAC Dunajská Streda	Győr
11:00 CET		Report		Stadium: ETO Park

== Competitions ==
=== Overall record ===
Competition	First match	Last match	Starting round	Record							
Competition	First match	Last match	Starting round	Pld	W	D	L	GF	GA	GD	Win %
Slovak First Football League	28 July 2024		Matchday 1	0	0	0	0	0	0	+0	—
Slovak Cup				0	0	0	0	0	0	+0	—
UEFA Conference League	25 July 2024		Second qualifying round	0	0	0	0	0	0	+0	—
Total				0	0	0	0	0	0	+0	—

Source: Soccerway

=== Slovak First Football League ===
==== League table ====
Pos	Team	Pld	W	D	L	GF	GA	GD	Pts	Qualification
1	Slovan Bratislava	22	15	4	3	48	25	+23	49	Qualification for the championship group
2	Žilina	22	13	6	3	42	20	+22	45	Qualification for the championship group
3	Spartak Trnava	22	12	8	2	34	17	+17	44	Qualification for the championship group
4	DAC Dunajská Streda	22	8	8	6	32	22	+10	32	Qualification for the championship group
5	Podbrezová	22	7	9	6	31	29	+2	30	Qualification for the championship group
6	Košice	22	7	8	7	31	25	+6	29	Qualification for the championship group
7	Zemplín Michalovce	22	6	9	7	28	34	−6	27	Qualification for the relegation group

Source: Niké liga (in Slovak)
Rules for classification: 1) Points; 2) Head-to-head points; 3) Head-to-head goal difference; 4) Head-to-head away goals scored; 5) Play-off.

Pos	Team	Pld	W	D	L	GF	GA	GD	Pts	Qualification	SLO	ŽIL	TRN	DAC	KOŠ	POD
1	Slovan Bratislava (C, Q)	32	22	6	4	74	39	+35	72	Qualification for the Champions League second qualifying round (Note: Since already qualified Paris Saint-Germain won the Champions League, Slovan Bratislava was promoted to the Champions League second qualifying round as one of the two champions with the highest coefficient in Champions League qualifying.)	—	4–3	1–1	2–2	1–0	3–1
2	Žilina (Q)	32	15	9	8	55	40	+15	54	Qualification for the Conference League second qualifying round	0–5	—	2–1	0–1	0–0	0–0
3	Spartak Trnava (Q)	32	14	10	8	46	34	+12	52	Qualification for the Europa League first qualifying round	2–3	2–4	—	1–1	0–1	2–1
4	DAC Dunajská Streda (O)	32	13	12	7	48	34	+14	51	Qualification for the Conference League play-offs	2–1	3–1	1–0	—	3–2	1–1
5	Košice	32	11	11	10	45	38	+7	44	Qualification for the Conference League play-offs	2–3	3–2	2–1	2–2	—	1–1
6	Železiarne Podbrezová	32	8	13	11	40	43	−3	37	Qualification for the Conference League play-offs	1–3	1–1	1–2	2–0	0–1	—

Source: Niké liga (in Slovak)
Legend: Blue = home team win; Yellow = draw; Red = away team win.
Rules for classification: 1) Points; 2) Head-to-head points; 3) Head-to-head goal difference; 4) Head-to-head away goals scored; 5) Play-off.
(C) Champions; (O) Play-off winners; (Q) Qualified for the phase indicated
Notes:

Pos	Team	Pld	W	D	L	GF	GA	GD	Pts	Qualification or relegation	ZMI	KOM	SKA	RUŽ	TRE	DUK
1	Zemplín Michalovce	32	10	10	12	48	56	−8	40	Qualification for the Conference League play-offs	—	4–5	2–4	2–1	3–2	3–3
2	Komárno	32	11	6	15	36	48	−12	39		0–1	—	1–1	1–2	0–0	2–1
3	Skalica	32	10	8	14	36	45	−9	38		1–0	0–1	—	1–0	1–0	3–1
4	Ružomberok	32	10	6	16	35	50	−15	36		1–0	0–1	3–2	—	1–0	1–2
5	Trenčín (O)	32	7	14	11	37	48	−11	35	Qualification for the relegation play-offs	3–2	1–0	2–0	2–2	—	2–2
6	Dukla Banská Bystrica (R)	32	5	7	20	35	60	−25	22	Relegation to the 2. Liga	2–3	0–1	0–2	0–2	2–3	—

Source: Niké liga (in Slovak)
Legend: Blue = home team win; Yellow = draw; Red = away team win.
Rules for classification: 1) Points; 2) Head-to-head points; 3) Head-to-head goal difference; 4) Head-to-head away goals scored; 5) Play-off.
(O) Play-off winners; (R) Relegated

==== Results summary ====
Overall								Home						Away					
Pld	W	D	L	GF	GA	GD	Pts	W	D	L	GF	GA	GD	W	D	L	GF	GA	GD
18	6	6	6	24	19	+5	24	2	3	4	10	12	−2	4	3	2	14	7	+7

Last updated: 14 December 2024.
Source: soccerway

===== Results by round =====
Round	1	2	3	4	5	6	7	8	9	10	11	12	13	14	15	16	17	18	19	20	21	22
Ground	A	H	A	A	H	A	H	A	H	H	A	H	A	H	H	A	H	A	H	A	A	H
Result	D	W	L	W	W	W	L	W	D	L	D	L	W	D	L	D	D	L				
Position	2	2	6	3	3	3	3	3	3	4	3	4	4	4	4	4	4	4				

Updated to match(es) played on 14 December 2024. Source: worldfootball
A = Away; H = Home; W = Win; D = Draw; L = Loss

==== Matches ====
28 July 2024 1	Košice	2–2	DAC 1904	Košice
18:00 UTC+2	Medved 24' 90+6' (pen.)	Report	Almási 11'; Herc 57'; Bajo (yellow card) 60'; Yapi (yellow card) 90+5'	Stadium: Košická futbalová aréna Attendance: 4,052; Referee: (Slovakia) Boris Marhefka

4 August 2024 2	DAC 1904	2–0	Komárno	Dunajská Streda
18:00 CET	Trusa 40' (yellow card) 87'; Milán Vitális 79'	Report	Sylvestr (yellow card) 29'; Christian Bayemi (yellow card) 75'	Stadium: MOL Aréna; Attendance: 7,493; Referee: (Slovakia) Marián Ruc

11 August 2024 3	Dukla Banská Bystrica	1–0	DAC 1904	Banská Bystrica
18:00 CET	Malec 51'; Brenkus (yellow card) 90+3'	Report	Alex Méndez (yellow card) 88'	Stadium: Národný Atletický Štadión; Attendance: 1,853; Referee: (Slovakia) Ivan Kružliak

17 August 2024 4	Zemplín Michalovce	0–3	DAC 1904	Michalovce
18:00 CET	Taraduda (yellow card) 28'	Report	Dimun (yellow card) 20' (goal) 32' (pen.); Trusa (yellow card) 22' (goal) 53'; Yapi (yellow card) 33'; Bajo (yellow card) 65'; Redzic 90+5'	Stadium: Mestský futbalový štadión Attendance: 1,724; Referee: (Slovakia) Martin Dohál

14 September 2024 7	DAC 1904	1–2	Slovan Bratislava	Dunajská Streda
20:30 CET	Kashia 48' (o.g.); Levente Bősze (yellow card) 84'; Kacharaba (yellow card) 88'; Mateus Brunetti (yellow card) 90+7'	Report	Weiss (yellow card) 38'; Barseghyan 56' 89' (pen.); Kashia (yellow card) 69'; Wimmer (yellow card) 88'; Bajrić (yellow card) 90+9'; Blackman (yellow card) 90+9'	Stadium: MOL Aréna; Attendance: 6,080; Referee: (Slovakia) Martin Dohál

17 September 2024 6	Trenčín	0–3	DAC 1904	Trenčín
18:00 CET	Đerlek (yellow card) 33'; Tadeáš Hájovský (yellow card) 60'; Luka Zorić (yellow card) 87'; Sani Suleiman (yellow card) 89'	Report	Alex Méndez (yellow card) 16'; Redzic 22' (yellow card) 71'; Trusa 27' 65'; Bajo (yellow card) 37'	Stadium: Štadión Sihoť; Attendance: 2,006; Referee: (Slovakia) Michal Smolak

21 September 2024 8	Skalica	1–3	DAC 1904	Skalica
18:00 CET	Matejov (yellow card) 34'; Dani Alves 45+2'; Junas (yellow card) 90+1'	Report	Trusa 15'; Bajo (yellow card) 68'; Redzic 90' 90+3'	Stadium: Mestský štadión Skalica; Attendance: 803; Referee: (Slovakia) Boris Marhefka

28 September 2024 9	DAC 1904	0–0	Spartak Trnava	Dunajská Streda
20:30 CET	Redzic (yellow card) 33'	Report	Pich (yellow card) 23'; Kratochvíl (yellow card) 52'; Procházka (yellow card) 90+1'; Kubista (yellow card) 90+4'	Stadium: MOL Aréna; Attendance: 5,327; Referee: (Slovakia) Ivan Kružliak

6 October 2024 10	DAC 1904	0–3	Žilina	Dunajská Streda
18:00 CET	Alex Méndez (yellow card) 51'; Mateus Brunetti (yellow card) 73'	Report	Kaprálik 9'; Minárik 17'; Ndjeungoue (yellow card) 61'; Ďuriš 70'; Kopásek (yellow card) 82'	Stadium: MOL Aréna; Attendance: 4,652; Referee: (Slovakia) Boris Marhefka

19 October 2024 11	Ružomberok	1–1	DAC 1904	Ružomberok
15:30 CET	Lavrinčík 18' (pen.) (yellow card) 70'; Tučný (yellow card) 33'; Gabriel (yellow card) 67'; Kelemen (yellow card) 90+1'	Report	Bassey 12'; Alex Méndez (yellow card) 41'; Almási (yellow card) 69'; Yapi (yellow card) 72'; Ortíz (yellow card) 85'	Stadium: Štadión pod Čebraťom; Attendance: 1,033; Referee: (Slovakia) Ivan Kružliak

26 October 2024 12	DAC 1904	1–3	FC Košice	Dunajská Streda
18:00 CET	Milán Vitális (yellow card) 25'; Bajo (yellow card) 34'; Trusa 45+1' (pen.); Ortíz (yellow card) 88'; Mateus Brunetti (yellow card) 90'	Report	Gallovič 6' 28'; Šípoš (yellow card) 83'; Gorosito 90+3'	Stadium: MOL Aréna; Attendance: 4,047; Referee: (Slovakia) Michal Smolak

29 October 2024 5	DAC 1904	3–0	Podbrezová	Dunajská Streda
18:00 CET	Alex Méndez (yellow card) 8' (goal) 55'; Almási 20'; Máté Tuboly (yellow card) 27'; Ortíz (yellow card) 45+3'; Milán Vitális 62'	Report	Slávik (yellow card) 37'; Paraj (yellow card) 67'; Peter Juritka (yellow card) 77'	Stadium: MOL Aréna; Attendance: 2,535; Referee: (Slovakia) Ivan Kružliak

2 November 2024 13	Komárno	0–1	DAC 1904	Zlaté Moravce
15:30 CET	Pillár (yellow card) 9'; Dominik Žák (yellow card) 61' (yellow-red card) 90+5'	Report	Máté Tuboly (yellow card) 19'; Almási (yellow card) 30'; Redzic (yellow card) 62'; Trusa (yellow card) 65' (goal) 90+7' (pen.); Ortíz (yellow card) 83'	Stadium: ViOn Aréna; Attendance: 930; Referee: (Slovakia) Peter Ziemba

10 November 2024 14	DAC 1904	0–0	Dukla Banská Bystrica	Dunajská Streda
15:30 CET	Alex Méndez (yellow card) 23'; Máté Tuboly (red card) 64'	Report	Slebodník (yellow card) 54'; Považanec (yellow card) 68'	Stadium: MOL Aréna; Attendance: 2,239; Referee: (Slovakia) Marián Ruc

23 November 2024 15	DAC 1904	0–1	Zemplín Michalovce	Dunajská Streda
15:30 CET		Report	Danko 59'	Stadium: MOL Aréna; Attendance: 1,767; Referee: (Slovakia) Peter Kráľovič

30 November 2024 16	Podbrezová	0–0	DAC 1904	Podbrezová
18:00 CET	Galčík (yellow card) 66'; Faško (yellow card) 82'; Filip Mielke (yellow card) 83'	Report	Trusa (yellow card) 17'; Popović (yellow card) 44'; Herc (yellow card) 45+1'; Ammar Ramadan (yellow card) 59'; Bajo (yellow card) 83'	Stadium: ZELPO Aréna; Attendance: 537; Referee: (Slovakia) Ivan Kružliak

8 December 2024 17	DAC 1904	3–3	Trenčín	Dunajská Streda
15:30 CET	Bassey 15' 65'; Mateus Brunetti (yellow card) 21'; Máté Tuboly (yellow card) 62'; Kacharaba (yellow card) 70'; Andzouana 87' (pen.)	Report	Tadeáš Hájovský 2'; Skovajsa (yellow card) 20'; Uchegbu 33'; Stojsavljević 45+7' (yellow card) 77'; Bariš (yellow card) 68'	Stadium: MOL Aréna; Attendance: 2,065; Referee: (Slovakia) Bálint Kišš

=== Slovak Cup ===
28 August 2024 Second Round	TJ Salka	0-9	DAC 1904	Salka
17:00 CET		Report	Andzouana 8' 34'; Trusa 26' 44'; Milán Vitális 40'; Bernát 53' 74'; Levente Bősze 77'; Szendrei 80'	Stadium: Futbalový štadión TJ Salka; Attendance: 1,980; Referee: (Slovakia) Bálint Kišš

25 September 2024 Third Round	Veľké Ludince	0-3	DAC 1904	Veľké Ludince
15:30 CET		Report	Trusa 19' 33'; Szendrei 71'	Stadium: Štadión TJ Družstevník Veľké Ludince

23 October 2024 Fourth Round	Slovan Duslo Šaľa	1-2	DAC 1904	Šaľa
15:000 CET	András Mészáros (yellow card) 26'; Carlos Palacios Romana 74'; Ladislav Rybánsky (yellow card) 84'	Report	Alex Méndez (yellow card) 11'; Trusa 15'; Yapi (yellow card) 40'; Andzouana 88' (pen.); Mateus Brunetti (yellow card) 90+4'	Stadium: Šaľa Stadium; Attendance: 1,225; Referee: (Slovakia) Matej Choreň

6 November 2024 Round of 16	DAC 1904	0-2	Dukla Banská Bystrica	Dunajská Streda
18:000 CET	Bajo (yellow card) 27'; Yapi (yellow card) 77'	Report	Slebodník (yellow card) 25'; Hanes 33'; Rymarenko 75'	Stadium: MOL Aréna; Attendance: 1,917; Referee: (Slovakia) Peter Kráľovič

=== UEFA Conference League ===
==== Second qualifying round ====
The draw was held on 19 June 2024.

25 July 2024 First leg	Zira (Azerbaijan)	4–0	(Slovakia) DAC Dunajská Streda	Baku
19:30 UTC+4	Raphael Utzig 29'; Martins Júnior 31'; Volkovi 51' 53'	Report	Milán Vitális (yellow card) 26'; Popović (yellow card) 29'	Stadium: Dalga Arena; Attendance: 2,150; Referee: (Luxembourg) Ivo Torres

1 August 2024 Second leg	DAC Dunajská Streda (Slovakia)	1–2 (1–6 agg.)	(Azerbaijan) Zira	Dunajská Streda
20:30 UTC+2	Alex Méndez 40'; Yapi (red card) 56'; Andzouana (yellow card) 72'; Bajo (yellow card) 77'; Milán Vitális (yellow card) 88'	Report	Raphael Utzig 25'; Alıyev 57' (pen.)	Stadium: MOL Aréna; Attendance: 3,754; Referee: (North Macedonia) Jovan Kachevski
