= 2021–22 2. Liga (Slovakia) =

2. Liga
- Season: 2021–22
- Champions: Podbrezová
- Promoted: Podbrezová; Dukla Banská Bystrica; Skalica
- Relegated: Námestovo; Partizán Bardejov; Slovan Bratislava U21; Rohožník
- Matches: 240
- Goals: 676 (2.82 per match)
- Top goalscorer: Marek Kuzma (22)

The 2021–22 2. Liga was the 29th season of the 2. Liga in Slovakia, since its establishment in 1993.

== Changes ==
The following teams have changed division since the 2020–21 season:

=== To 2. liga ===
Relegated from Fortuna liga

- None, because relegated club FC Nitra did not obtain license for the new 2. liga season.

Promoted from 3. liga

- Rohožník (Bratislava)
- Námestovo (Middle)
- Humenné (East)

=== From 2. liga ===
Promoted to Fortuna liga

- Liptovský Mikuláš

Relegated to 3. liga

- Poprad

== Teams ==
=== Stadiums and locations ===
Location of teams in Slovak 2. liga 2020–21

Team	Location	Stadium	Capacity
MFK Dukla Banská Bystrica	Banská Bystrica	Národný Atletický Štadión	7,000
MFK Skalica	Skalica	Mestský štadión Skalica	1,500
Podbrezová	Podbrezová	ZELPO Aréna	4,061
FC Košice	Košice	Košická futbalová aréna	5,836
FC ŠTK 1914 Šamorín	Šamorín	Pomlé Stadium	1,950
MŠK Púchov	Púchov	Mestský štadión Púchov	6,614
KFC Komárno	Komárno	Mestský štadión Komárno	1,250
FC Petržalka	Petržalka	Štadión FC Petržalka	1,600
FK Slavoj Trebišov	Trebišov	Štadión Slavoj Trebišov	2,000
FK Dubnica	Dubnica nad Váhom	Mestský futbalový štadión	5,450
MŠK Žilina B	Žilina	Štadión pod Dubňom	11,258
Partizán Bardejov	Bardejov	Mestský štadión Bardejov	3,040
Slovan Bratislava U21	Bratislava	Štadión Pasienky	11,401
Humenné	Humenné	Štadión Humenné	1,806
Rohožník	Rohožník	Štadión FC Rohožník	1,100
Námestovo	Námestovo	Štadión MŠK Námestovo	2,000

=== Personnel and kits ===
Note: Flags indicate national team as has been defined under FIFA eligibility rules. Players and Managers may hold more than one non-FIFA nationality.

Team	Head coach	Captain	Kit manufacturer	Shirt sponsor
MFK Skalica	(Slovakia) Jozef Kostelník	(Slovakia) Martin Nagy	(Germany) Puma	-
FK Slavoj Trebišov	(Slovakia) Ondrej Desiatnik	(Slovakia) Roman Begala	(Germany) Adidas	Armstav
MŠK Žilina B	(Slovakia) Vladimír Veselý	(Slovakia) Viktor Pečovský	(United States) Nike	Preto
KFC Komárno	(Slovakia) Mikuláš Radványi	(Slovakia) Kornel Saláta	(Germany) Adidas	MOL
Partizán Bardejov	(Slovakia) Jaroslav Galko	(Slovakia) Richard Župa	(Germany) Adidas	SETL SK
FC Petržalka	(Slovakia) Mário Auxt	(Slovakia) Lukáš Gašparovič	(Italy) Erreà	PORTUM Towers
FC ŠTK 1914 Šamorín	(Slovakia) Michal Kuruc	(Slovakia) Juraj Pančík	(Italy) Kappa	Slovnaft
FK Dubnica	(Slovakia) Peter Jakuš	(Slovakia) Marek Kuzma	(Germany) Adidas	-
MFK Dukla Banská Bystrica	(Slovakia) Stanislav Varga	(Slovakia) Ľuboš Kupčík	(Germany) Adidas	Veolia
Slovan Bratislava U21	(Slovakia) Vladimir Gala	(Czech Republic) Ondřej Petrák	(Germany) Adidas	grafobal
MŠK Púchov	(Slovakia) Vladimír Cifranič	(Slovakia) František Brezničan	(Germany) Jako	
FC Košice	(Slovakia) Jozef Vukušič	(Slovakia) František Vancák	(Germany) Adidas	HELL
Podbrezová	(Czech Republic) Roman Skuhravý	(Slovakia) Boris Godál	(Germany) Adidas	Železiarne Podbrezová
FC Rohožník	(Slovakia) Szilárd Németh	(Slovakia) Marek Pittner	(United States) Nike	-
MŠK Námestovo	(Slovakia) Roman Marčok	(Slovakia) Michal Čiernik	(Germany) Adidas	Klenoty LOREN
FK Humenné	(Slovakia) Jozef Škrlík	(Slovakia) Erik Streňo	(Italy) Sportika	Triada

== League table ==
Pos	Team	Pld	W	D	L	GF	GA	GD	Pts	Promotion, qualification or relegation
1	Podbrezová (C, P)	30	24	2	4	86	25	+61	74	Promotion to Fortuna liga
2	Dukla Banská Bystrica (P)	30	21	6	3	62	24	+38	69	Promotion to Fortuna liga
3	Skalica (P)	30	19	5	6	49	20	+29	62	Promotion to Fortuna liga
4	Komárno	30	17	8	5	51	29	+22	59	
5	Košice	30	17	5	8	73	38	+35	56	
6	Humenné	30	16	8	6	36	30	+6	56	
7	Šamorín	30	13	5	12	47	42	+5	44	
8	Petržalka	30	12	5	13	54	48	+6	41	
9	Žilina B	30	10	7	13	46	48	−2	37	
10	Slavoj Trebišov	30	9	7	14	28	48	−20	34	
11	Dubnica	30	8	7	15	33	51	−18	31	
12	Púchov	30	8	5	17	36	49	−13	29	
13	Rohožník (R)	30	8	5	17	30	58	−28	29	Relegation to 3. Liga
14	Slovan Bratislava U21 (R)	30	7	5	18	36	61	−25	26	Relegation to 3. Liga
15	Partizán Bardejov (R)	30	3	9	18	26	54	−28	18	Relegation to 3. Liga
16	Námestovo (R)	30	2	3	25	19	87	−68	9	Relegation to 3. Liga

Source: Futbalnet (in Slovak)
Rules for classification: 1) Points; 2) Head-to-head points; 3) Head-to-head goal difference; 4) Head-to-head away goals scored; 5) Play-off.
(C) Champions; (P) Promoted; (R) Relegated

== Results ==
Each team plays home-and-away against every other team in the league, for a total of 30 matches each.

Home \ Away	POD	DBB	SKA	KOM	KOŠ	HUM	SAM	PET	ZAB	STV	DUB	ROH	PÚC	SJN	PAR	NAM
Podbrezová		2–0	1–3	2–3	3–1	3–0	3–0	2–3	3–0	3–0	8–0	2–1	4–0	5–0	7–1	3–1
Dukla Banská Bystrica	2–3		0–0	2–0	3–1	3–0	1–1	3–1	3–2	3–0	1–0	4–1	4–1	1–0	3–1	4–2
Skalica	0–2	0–0		1–1	2–0	0–1	1–0	2–0	4–0	4–1	4–1	2–0	1–0	3–0	2–0	2–0
Komárno	1–4	2–1	2–0		1–1	0–0	0–2	6–0	1–1	4–1	1–0	1–0	3–1	2–0	0–0	4–1
Košice	0–2	1–2	2–2	0–1		1–1	0–0	3–1	2–1	4–1	2–0	4–0	2–0	2–0	2–2	6–2
Humenné	1–0	1–1	2–1	1–0	0–3		3–1	1–0	1–0	3–0	1–1	4–2	0–3	1–0	2–1	2–0
Šamorín	1–1	0–1	0–1	1–2	4–3	1–1		2–0	3–0	2–0	4–0	1–2	2–3	6–0	3–0	2–1
Petržalka	0–1	1–2	0–2	2–2	3–8	1–1	7–0		0–1	0–0	3–0	4–1	3–1	4–1	2–1	6–0
Žilina B	3–5	0–1	0–2	1–1	3–2	3–0	1–1	1–4		2–1	4–3	1–1	2–2	5–0	1–0	9–0
Slavoj Trebišov	0–4	1–1	2–1	0–2	0–3	1–1	4–0	1–0	3–0		1–1	1–2	2–1	1–0	2–2	1–0
Dubnica	1–2	0–1	3–1	1–3	1–2	2–1	1–2	1–2	1–0	0–1		2–0	0–0	0–0	2–2	4–0
Rohožník	1–1	1–3	0–1	3–0	1–7	0–1	0–1	1–1	1–1	0–1	1–2		3–2	0–6	1–1	2–1
Púchov	0–2	0–2	1–2	0–1	1–2	0–1	2–1	1–1	1–2	2–0	1–2	1–0		4–3	1–1	2–0
Slovan U21	1–2	2–2	1–2	2–2	0–3	2–3	3–1	0–2	2–1	2–1	2–2	0–1	1–1		2–1	3–0
Partizán Bardejov	0–2	0–1	0–3	1–4	0–3	0–0	0–1	2–0	0–1	0–0	1–1	2–3	2–0	1–2		4–1
Námestovo	2–4	0–7	0–0	0–2	1–3	0–2	1–4	1–3	0–0	1–1	0–1	0–1	0–4	2–1	2–0	

Source: Futbalnet (in Slovak)
Legend: Blue = home team win; Yellow = draw; Red = away team win.

== Season statistics ==
As of 20 May 2022

=== Top goalscorers ===
Rank	Player	Club	Goals
1	(Slovakia) Marek Kuzma	Dubnica (9)/Podbrezová (13)	22
2	(Slovakia) Róbert Polievka	Banská Bystrica	18
3	(Slovakia) Erik Pačinda	Košice	17
4	(Colombia) José Ricardo Cortés	Košice	16
4	(Slovakia) Daniel Pavúk	Podbrezová	16
6	(Slovakia) Roland Galčík	Podbrezová	15
7	(Slovakia) Daniel Šebesta	Skalica	13
8	(Slovakia) Patrik Voleský	Skalica	12
8	(Slovakia) Péter Nagy	Šamorín	12
8	(Slovakia) Boris Turčák	Petržalka	12
11	(Bosnia and Herzegovina) Haris Harba	Petržalka	11
11	(Slovakia) David Depetris	Banská Bystrica	11

=== Top assists ===
Rank	Player	Club	Assists
1	(Slovakia) Roland Galčík	Podbrezová	12
2	(Denmark) Marcus Mølvadgaard	Košice	11
2	(Slovakia) Peter Kováčik	Podbrezová	10
3	(Slovakia) Róbert Polievka	Banská Bystrica	9
4	(Slovakia) Erik Streňo	Humenné	8
5	(Slovakia) Erik Pačinda	Košice	6
5	(Slovakia) Nicolas Martinek	Dubnica	6
5	(Slovakia) Samuel Ďatko	Podbrezová	6
8	(Slovakia) Daniel Šebesta	Skalica	5
8	(Slovakia) Patrik Danek	Petržalka	5
8	(Slovakia) Matej Jakúbek	Košice	5
8	(Slovakia) Marek Frimmel	Rohožník	5
8	(Slovakia) Marek Kuzma	Podbrezová	5

=== Clean sheets ===
Rank	Player	Club	Clean sheets
1	(Slovakia) Martin Junas	Skalica	17
2	(Slovakia) Richard Ludha	Podbrezová	14
3	(Slovakia) Matúš Hruška	Banská Bystrica	13
4	(Slovakia) Dávid Slávik	Humenné	12
5	(Slovakia) Miloslav Bréda	Komárno	10
6	(Slovakia) Igor Šemrinec	Košice	8
7	(Slovakia) Martin Melichar	Trebišov	6
7	(Slovakia) Samuel Vavrúš	Dubnica	6
9	(Slovakia) Marek Teplan	Žilina B	5
10	(Slovakia) Ján Čikoš-Pavličko	Bardejov	4
10	(Hungary) Dániel Veszelinov	Šamorín	4
10	(Hungary) Erik Zoltán Gyurákovics	Šamorín	4
10	(Slovakia) Kristián Strelčík	Púchov	4

=== Discipline ===
==== Player ====
- Most yellow cards: 10
  - (Slovakia) Erik Streňo (Humenné)
- Most red cards: 2
  - (Slovakia) Tomáš Filipiak (Trebišov)
  - (Slovakia) Martin Luberda (Humenné)
  - (Czech Republic) Ondřej Rudzan (Skalica)
  - (Slovakia) Matej Moško (Košice)

==== Club ====
- Most yellow cards: 82
  - Komárno
- Most red cards: 7
  - Bardejov

== Awards ==
=== Annual awards ===
==== Team of the Season ====
- Goalkeeper: (Slovakia) Richard Ludha (Podbrezová)
- Defenders: (Slovakia) Peter Kováčik (Podbrezová), (Slovakia) Marek Bartoš (Podbrezová), (Czech Republic) Ondřej Rudzan (Skalica), (Slovakia) René Paraj (Podbrezová), (Slovakia) Šimon Šmehýl (Komárno)
- Midfielders: (Slovakia) Samuel Ďatko (Podbrezová), (Slovakia) Roland Galčík (Podbrezová), (Slovakia) Erik Streňo (Humenné), (Slovakia) Erik Pačinda (Košice)
- Forward: (Slovakia) Róbert Polievka (B.Bystrica)

==== Individual awards ====
Manager of the Season

(Czech Republic) Roman Skuhravý (Podbrezová)

Player of the Season

(Slovakia) Róbert Polievka (B.Bystrica)

Young Player of the Season

(Slovakia) Roland Galčík (Podbrezová)
