= 2024–25 Slovak First Football League =

Football league in Slovakia

Niké liga
- Season: 2024–25
- Dates: Regular season: 27 July 2024 – 17 May 2025
- Champions: Slovan Bratislava (23rd title)
- Relegated: Dukla Banská Bystrica
- Champions League: Slovan Bratislava
- Europa League: Spartak Trnava
- Conference League: Žilina; DAC Dunajská Streda
- Matches: 206
- Goals: 564 (2.74 per match)
- Top goalscorer: Tigran Barseghyan (20); David Strelec (20)
- Biggest home win: Podbrezová 7–1 MFK Skalica (17 Aug 2024); Slovan Bratislava 6–0 KFC Komárno (4 Dec 2024)
- Biggest away win: Slovan Bratislava 0–5 MŠK Žilina (1 Sep 2024); MŠK Žilina 0–5 Slovan Bratislava (5 Apr 2025)
- Highest scoring: Michalovce 4–5 KFC Komárno (11 May 2025)
- Highest attendance: 14,125; Slovan Bratislava 1-0 FC Košice (17 May 2025)

The 2024–25 Slovak First Football League (known as Niké liga for sponsorship reasons) was the 32nd season of first-tier football league in Slovakia since its establishment in 1993.

Slovan Bratislava won the league for the seventh time in succession.

== Teams ==
The league will consist of twelve teams; the top eleven teams from the previous season, and one team promoted from the 2. Liga. Komárno has been promoted to the top flight (for the first time in their history) as champions of the 2023–24 2. Liga, replacing the 2023–24 Slovak First Football League bottom-placed team Zlaté Moravce after 14 years in top flight. Slovan Bratislava entered the season as defending champions and won their seventh consecutive title.

=== Stadiums and locations ===
Location of teams in Niké liga 2024–25

FC DAC 1904 Dunajská Streda	FK Dukla Banská Bystrica	FC Košice	FK Železiarne Podbrezová
MOL Aréna; UEFA	Štadión SNP; UEFA	Košická futbalová aréna UEFA	ZELPO Aréna; UEFA
Capacity: 12,700	Capacity: 7,030	Capacity: 12,555	Capacity: 4,000
MFK Ružomberok	MFK Skalica	ŠK Slovan Bratislava	FC Spartak Trnava
Štadión pod Čebraťom	Štadión MFK Skalica	Tehelné pole UEFA	Štadión Antona Malatinského; UEFA
Capacity: 4,876	Capacity: 2,600	Capacity: 22,500	Capacity: 18,200
AS Trenčín	MFK Zemplín Michalovce	KFC Komárno	MŠK Žilina
Štadión Sihoť; UEFA	Mestský futbalový štadión UEFA	ViOn Aréna; UEFA	Štadión pod Dubňom; UEFA
Capacity: 10,000	Capacity: 4,400	Capacity: 4,008	Capacity: 10,897

=== Personnel and kits ===
Team	President	Manager	Captain	Kit manufacturer	Shirt sponsor
DAC Dunajská Streda	(Slovakia) Tibor Végh	(Slovakia) Branislav Fodrek	(Republic of the Congo) Yhoan Andzouana	Macron	Kukkonia
Dukla Banská Bystrica	(Slovakia) Ivan Šabo	(Czech Republic) František Straka	(Slovakia) Ľubomír Willwéber	Adidas	Veolia
Košice	(Slovakia) Dušan Trnka	(Czech Republic) Roman Skuhravý	(Slovakia) Ján Krivák	Adidas	Niké
Podbrezová	(Slovakia) Július Kriváň	(Slovakia) Štefan Markulík	(Slovakia) Matej Oravec	Adidas	Niké
Ružomberok	(Slovakia) Ľubomír Golis	(Czech Republic) Ondřej Smetana	(Slovakia) Martin Chrien	Adidas	Niké
Skalica	(Slovakia) Peter Bartoš	(Czech Republic) David Oulehla	(Slovakia) Martin Nagy	Adidas	Tipsport
Slovan Bratislava	(Slovakia) Ivan Kmotrík	(Slovakia) Vladimír Weiss	(Slovakia) Vladimír Weiss	Adidas	Niké
Spartak Trnava	(Slovakia) Peter Macho	(Slovakia) Michal Gašparík	(Slovakia) Martin Mikovič	Puma	Tipsport
Trenčín	(Slovakia) Róbert Rybníček	(Slovakia) Ivan Galád	(Slovakia) Damián Bariš	Macron	Tipsport
Zemplín Michalovce	(Slovakia) Ján Sabol	(Slovakia) Anton Šoltis	(Slovakia) Igor Žofčák	Adidas	Tipsport
Komárno	(Slovakia) Juraj Baráth	(Slovakia) Norbert Czibor	(Slovakia) Martin Šimko	Adidas	MOL
Žilina	(Slovakia) Jozef Antošík	(Czech Republic) Michal Ščasný	(Slovakia) Tomáš Hubočan	Nike	Preto

=== Managerial changes ===
Team	Outgoing manager	Manner of departure	Date of vacancy	Position in table	Replaced by	Date of appointment
Banská Bystrica	(Slovakia) Mario Auxt	End of interim spell	16 June 2024	Pre-season	(Slovakia) Marek Bažík	16 June 2026
Michalovce	(Czech Republic) František Straka	End of contract	28 June 2024	Pre-season	(Slovakia) Anton Šoltis	28 June 2026
Podbrezová	(Czech Republic) Roman Skuhravý	End by own request	6 July 2024	Pre-season	(Slovakia) Vladimír Cifranič	12 July 2024
Skalica	(Slovakia) Pavol Majerník	Released	3 September 2024	12	(Czech Republic) David Oulehla	3 September 2024
Podbrezová	(Slovakia) Vladimír Cifranič	Becomes assistant	2 September 2024	8	(Slovakia) Štefan Markulík	2 September 2024
FC Košice	(Slovakia) Gergely Geri	Released	24 September 2024	10	(Czech Republic) Roman Skuhravý	24 September 2024
AS Trenčín	(Serbia) Ilija Stolica	Released	1 October 2024	11	(Slovakia) Ivan Galád	1 October 2024
MFK Ružomberok	(Czech Republic) Ondřej Smetana	Signed with (Czech Republic) 1. FC Slovácko	13 November 2024	6	(Czech Republic) Radim Kučera	13 November 2024
Dunajská Streda	(Spain) Xisco Muñoz	Released	27 November 2024	4	(Slovakia) Branislav Fodrek	27 November 2024
MFK Ružomberok	(Czech Republic) Radim Kučera	Released	20 December 2024	10	(Slovakia) Norbert Hrnčár	20 December 2024
Banská Bystrica	(Slovakia) Marek Bažík	Becomes assistant	27 December 2024	9	(Slovakia) Martin Poljovka	27 December 2024
Banská Bystrica	(Slovakia) Martin Poljovka	Released	17 March 2025	12	(Czech Republic) František Straka	17 March 2025
MFK Ružomberok	(Slovakia) Norbert Hrnčár	Released	8 April 2025	11	(Czech Republic) Ondřej Smetana	13 November 2024

== Regular stage ==
=== League table ===
Pos	Team	Pld	W	D	L	GF	GA	GD	Pts	Qualification
1	Slovan Bratislava	22	15	4	3	48	25	+23	49	Qualification for the championship group
2	Žilina	22	13	6	3	42	20	+22	45	Qualification for the championship group
3	Spartak Trnava	22	12	8	2	34	17	+17	44	Qualification for the championship group
4	DAC Dunajská Streda	22	8	8	6	32	22	+10	32	Qualification for the championship group
5	Podbrezová	22	7	9	6	31	29	+2	30	Qualification for the championship group
6	Košice	22	7	8	7	31	25	+6	29	Qualification for the championship group
7	Zemplín Michalovce	22	6	9	7	28	34	−6	27	Qualification for the relegation group
8	Komárno	22	6	4	12	24	38	−14	22	Qualification for the relegation group
9	Ružomberok	22	5	5	12	22	39	−17	20 (Note: Ranked on head-to-head points: Ružomberok (4); Trenčín (1).)	Qualification for the relegation group
10	Trenčín	22	3	11	8	22	35	−13	20	Qualification for the relegation group
11	Skalica	22	4	7	11	21	35	−14	19	Qualification for the relegation group
12	Dukla Banská Bystrica	22	4	5	13	22	38	−16	17	Qualification for the relegation group

Source: Niké liga (in Slovak)
Rules for classification: 1) Points; 2) Head-to-head points; 3) Head-to-head goal difference; 4) Head-to-head away goals scored; 5) Play-off.

=== Results ===
Each team plays home-and-away against every other team in the league, for a total of 22 matches each.

Home \ Away	DAC	DUK	KOM	KOŠ	POD	RUŽ	SKA	SLO	TRN	TRE	ZMI	ŽIL
DAC Dunajská Streda		0–0	2–0	1–3	3–0	3–0	3–1	1–2	0–0	3–3	0–1	0–3
Dukla Banská Bystrica	1–0		2–3	2–3	0–2	2–1	1–1	0–2	1–4	6–1	1–0	1–2
Komárno	0–1	3–0		1–1	1–2	1–2	0–0	1–4	1–2	2–1	1–3	1–0
Košice	2–2	4–0	0–1		3–0	2–1	1–1	1–1	1–1	0–0	3–2	1–2
Podbrezová	0–0	1–1	2–2	0–0		2–0	7–1	1–3	0–4	2–1	4–1	0–0
Ružomberok	1–1	1–1	1–3	2–1	1–0		1–2	1–5	0–2	1–0	2–2	1–0
Skalica	1–3	1–0	3–0	0–0	1–2	1–0		2–3	1–2	0–0	0–0	0–0
Slovan Bratislava	2–1	3–1	6–0	2–1	1–0	2–1	3–1		0–1	1–1	1–1	0–5
Spartak Trnava	1–1	1–0	3–2	1–0	1–1	2–2	2–0	0–1		0–0	3–1	0–0
Trenčín	0–3	2–2	1–0	2–0	1–1	0–0	2–1	1–1	2–3		0–0	2–4
Zemplín Michalovce	0–3	1–0	0–0	3–2	2–2	4–2	2–1	2–4	0–0	1–1		1–1
Žilina	1–1	2–0	2–1	0–2	2–2	3–1	3–2	2–1	3–1	4–1	3–1	

Source: Niké liga (in Slovak)
Legend: Blue = home team win; Yellow = draw; Red = away team win.

== Championship group ==
Pos	Team	Pld	W	D	L	GF	GA	GD	Pts	Qualification	SLO	ŽIL	TRN	DAC	KOŠ	POD
1	Slovan Bratislava (C, Q)	32	22	6	4	74	39	+35	72	Qualification for the Champions League second qualifying round (Note: Since already qualified Paris Saint-Germain won the Champions League, Slovan Bratislava was promoted to the Champions League second qualifying round as one of the two champions with the highest coefficient in Champions League qualifying.)	—	4–3	1–1	2–2	1–0	3–1
2	Žilina (Q)	32	15	9	8	55	40	+15	54	Qualification for the Conference League second qualifying round	0–5	—	2–1	0–1	0–0	0–0
3	Spartak Trnava (Q)	32	14	10	8	46	34	+12	52	Qualification for the Europa League first qualifying round	2–3	2–4	—	1–1	0–1	2–1
4	DAC Dunajská Streda (O)	32	13	12	7	48	34	+14	51	Qualification for the Conference League play-offs	2–1	3–1	1–0	—	3–2	1–1
5	Košice	32	11	11	10	45	38	+7	44	Qualification for the Conference League play-offs	2–3	3–2	2–1	2–2	—	1–1
6	Železiarne Podbrezová	32	8	13	11	40	43	−3	37	Qualification for the Conference League play-offs	1–3	1–1	1–2	2–0	0–1	—

Source: Niké liga (in Slovak)
Legend: Blue = home team win; Yellow = draw; Red = away team win.
Rules for classification: 1) Points; 2) Head-to-head points; 3) Head-to-head goal difference; 4) Head-to-head away goals scored; 5) Play-off.
(C) Champions; (O) Play-off winners; (Q) Qualified for the phase indicated

== Relegation group ==
Pos	Team	Pld	W	D	L	GF	GA	GD	Pts	Qualification or relegation	ZMI	KOM	SKA	RUŽ	TRE	DUK
1	Zemplín Michalovce	32	10	10	12	48	56	−8	40	Qualification for the Conference League play-offs	—	4–5	2–4	2–1	3–2	3–3
2	Komárno	32	11	6	15	36	48	−12	39		0–1	—	1–1	1–2	0–0	2–1
3	Skalica	32	10	8	14	36	45	−9	38		1–0	0–1	—	1–0	1–0	3–1
4	Ružomberok	32	10	6	16	35	50	−15	36		1–0	0–1	3–2	—	1–0	1–2
5	Trenčín (O)	32	7	14	11	37	48	−11	35	Qualification for the relegation play-offs	3–2	1–0	2–0	2–2	—	2–2
6	Dukla Banská Bystrica (R)	32	5	7	20	35	60	−25	22	Relegation to the 2. Liga	2–3	0–1	0–2	0–2	2–3	—

Source: Niké liga (in Slovak)
Legend: Blue = home team win; Yellow = draw; Red = away team win.
Rules for classification: 1) Points; 2) Head-to-head points; 3) Head-to-head goal difference; 4) Head-to-head away goals scored; 5) Play-off.
(O) Play-off winners; (R) Relegated

== Conference League play-offs ==
The winner of the 2024–25 Slovak Cup, Spartak Trnava, finished in the top 3 in the league, which already secured them a spot in the Europa League. As a result, a playoff was held for the final spot in the Conference League, which involved the teams ranked in 4th–7th place at the conclusion of the regular season. The play-offs were one-off matches with extra time and penalties used to determine the winner if necessary, with the higher-ranked teams given home advantage against the lower-ranked teams (i.e. 3rd v. 7th and 5th v. 6th) in the semi-finals. The higher-ranked of the two semi-final winners also gained home advantage in the final. DAC Dunajská Streda won the play-offs but were subsequently excluded from the Conference League due to the club having the same ownership as Hungarian side Győri ETO FC, who had also qualified for the competition. Košice took their place in Conference League qualifying.

Semi-finals
4	DAC Dunajská Streda	2
7	Zemplín Michalovce	1
5	Košice	2(4)
6	Podbrezová (p)	2(5)

Final
4	DAC Dunajská Streda	3
6	Podbrezová	2

=== Semi-finals ===
20 May 2025
20:00 CEST (UTC+02:00)

Košice	2–2 (a.e.t.)	Podbrezová
Faško 15'; Niarchos 16'	Report	Yirajang 33'; Kováčik 58'
Penalties
Faško (penalty scored); Kružliak (penalty scored); Jakubko (penalty scored); Innocenti (penalty scored); Sovič (penalty missed)	4–5	(penalty scored) Kováčik; (penalty scored) Juritka; (penalty scored) Galčík; (penalty scored) Koštrna; (penalty scored) Deml

Košická futbalová aréna, Košice
Attendance: 2,857
Referee: Martin Dohál
20 May 2025
20:00 CEST (UTC+02:00)

DAC Dunajská Streda	2–1	Zemplín Michalovce
Kacharaba 43'; Đukanović 57'	Report	Kyziridis 15'

MOL Aréna, Dunajská Streda
Attendance: 3,950
Referee: Peter Ziemba

=== Final ===
23 May 2025
18:00 CEST (UTC+02:00)

DAC Dunajská Streda	3–2	Podbrezová
Ramadan 10', 84'; Sylla 26'	Report	Paraj 24'; Smékal 71'

MOL Aréna, Dunajská Streda
Attendance: 5,382
Referee: Michal Očenáš

== Relegation play-offs ==
The team which finished 11th faced the 2nd team from 2. Liga for one spot in the top flight in the next season.

1st leg

20 May 2025
20:00 CEST (UTC+02:00)

Zlaté Moravce	1–1	Trenčín
Kuzma 13'	Report	Emeka 53'

ViOn Aréna, Zlaté Moravce
Attendance: 2,886
Referee: Filip Glova

2nd leg

24 May 2025
17:00 CEST (UTC+02:00)

Trenčín	4–2	Zlaté Moravce
Skovajsa 5'; Emeka 47'; Gajdoš 63' (pen.); Khan 90+5'	Report	Kadlec 21'; Helebrand 90+3'

Štadión Sihoť, Trenčín
Attendance: 2,225
Referee: Ivan Kružliak

== Season statistics ==
=== Top goalscorers ===
As of 18 May 2025

Rank	Player	Club	Goals
1	(Armenia) Tigran Barseghyan	Slovan	20
1	(Slovakia) David Strelec	Slovan	20
3	(Greece) Alexandros Kyziridis^{1}	Michalovce	14
4	(Slovakia) Martin Rymarenko	Banská Bystrica	13
5	(Slovakia) Matej Trusa	Dunajská Streda	10
5	(Slovakia) Dávid Ďuriš	Žilina	10
5	(Slovakia) Róbert Mak	Slovan	10
5	(Czech Republic) Jan Hladík	Ružomberok	10
9	(Slovenia) Žan Medved	Košice	9
9	(Ghana) Kelvin Ofori	Trnava	9
9	(Syria) Ammar Ramadan^{2}	Dunajská Streda	9

^{1} plus 1 playoff goal
^{2} plus 2 playoff goals

==== Hat-tricks ====
Round	Player	For	Against	Result	Date	Ref
15	(Slovakia) Martin Rymarenko	Banská Bystrica	Trenčín	6–1 (H)	23 November 2024	
19	(Slovakia) Róbert Mak	Slovan Bratislava	Ružomberok	5–1 (A)	9 February 2025	
8 (CG)	(Slovakia) David Strelec	Slovan Bratislava	Žilina	4–3 (H)	3 May 2025	

=== Clean sheets ===
As of 18 May 2025

Rank	Player	Club	Clean sheets
1	(Slovakia) Martin Junas	Skalica	13
2	(Slovenia) Žiga Frelih	Trnava	10
3	(Serbia) Aleksandar Popović	Dunajská Streda	9
3	(Slovakia) Dávid Šípoš	Košice	9
5	(Slovakia) Ľubomír Belko	Žilina	8
5	(Slovakia) Filip Dlubáč	Komárno	8
7	(Slovakia) Adam Danko	Podbrezová	7
8	(Slovakia) Matúš Slavíček	Trenčín	6
9	(Serbia) Andrija Katić	Trenčín	4
9	(Slovakia) Dominik Ťapaj	Ružomberok	4

=== Discipline ===
As of 18 May 2025

==== Player ====
- Most yellow cards: 11
  - (Ukraine) Denys Taraduda (Michalovce)
- Most red cards: 2
  - (Nigeria) Chinonso Emeka (Trenčín)
  - (Slovakia) Ján Krivák (Košice)
  - (Slovakia) Matúš Malý (Ružomberok)
  - (Georgia (country)) Guram Kashia (Slovan)

==== Club ====
- Most yellow cards: 78
  - Trenčín
- Most red cards: 6
  - Michalovce

== Awards ==
=== Annual awards ===
==== Team of the Season ====

Team of the Season was:

- Goalkeeper: (Slovakia) Dominik Takáč (Slovan Bratislava)
- Defenders: (Panama) César Blackman (Slovan Bratislava), (Slovakia) Tomáš Hubočan (MŠK Žilina), (Slovenia) Kenan Bajrić (Slovan Bratislava), (Republic of the Congo) Yhoan Andzouana (DAC D.Streda)
- Midfielders: (Armenia) Tigran Barseghyan (Slovan Bratislava), (Slovakia) Mario Sauer (MŠK Žilina), (Slovenia) Adrian Zeljković (Spartak Trnava), (Syria) Ammar Ramadan (Dunajská Streda)
- Attacking Midfielder: (Slovakia) Michal Faško (Košice)
- Forwards: (Slovakia) David Strelec Slovan Bratislava)

==== Individual awards ====
Manager of the Season

(Slovakia) Vladimír Weiss (Slovan Bratislava)

Player of the Season

(Armenia) Tigran Barseghyan (Slovan Bratislava)

Young Player of the Season

(Slovakia) Mario Sauer (MŠK Žilina)

== Attendances ==
The football clubs are listed by average home league attendance.

No.	Club	Average attendance	Change	Highest
1	ŠK Slovan Bratislava	7,359	27.2%	14,125
2	FC Spartak Trnava	4,602	1.4%	13,583
3	FC DAC Dunajská Streda	4,334	-24.1%	7,493
4	FC Košice	4,089	19.0%	7,298
5	MŠK Žilina FK 1908	2,222	19.5%	5,732
6	MFK Zemplín Michalovce	1,334	13.5%	3,089
7	MFK Dukla Banská Bystrica	1,298	-18.2%	4,125
8	FK AS Trenčín	1,236	-30.8%	3,053
9	FK Železiarne Podbrezová	1,209	-18.8%	3,687
10	MFK Ružomberok	1,078	-22.2%	2,721
11	MFK Skalica	784	-32.2%	2,515
12	KFC Komárno	600	81.0%	1,915

== See also ==
- 2024–25 Slovak Cup
- 2024–25 2. Liga (Slovakia)
- List of Slovak football transfers summer 2024
- List of Slovak football transfers winter 2024–25
- List of foreign Slovak First League players
