= Faško =

Faško is a surname. Notable people with the surname include:

- Michal Faško (born 1994), Slovak football midfielder
- Šimon Faško (born 2006), Slovak football midfielder, younger brother of Michal Faško
