= Jozef Mores =

Slovak former footballer and manager (born 1972)

Personal information
- Full name: Jozef Mores
- Date of birth: 21 September 1972 (age 54)
- Place of birth: Ružomberok, Czechoslovakia
- Position: Midfielder

Youth career
- FC TJ Oravský Podzámok
- Dolný Kubín
- 1987–: Dukla Banská Bystrica

Senior career*
Years	Team	Apps	(Gls)
- Dukla Banská Bystrica
- Passau
1995	Dukla Banská Bystrica		
1997–1998	→ Banská Štiavnica (loan)		
1998–1999	Podbrezová		
- Regensburg
- SpVgg Weiden
- Piešťany
- Rakytovce

Managerial career
- Dukla Banská Bystrica (youths)
- 2008–2010: Rakytovce
- Dolná Ždaňa
- ŽP Šport Podbrezová (youth)
- 2015: ŽP Šport Podbrezová
- 2019-2020: ŽP Šport Podbrezová
- 2022-: Dukla Banská Bystrica (Sp.Director)
- * Club domestic league appearances and goals

Jozef Mores (born 21 September 1972) is a Slovak former footballer and manager. He is currently the sporting director of his former club, Dukla Banská Bystrica.

== Managerial career ==
After retiring from football, Mores became the coach of the under-19 side at Dukla Banská Bystrica at the age of 35. He won the third league twice with Rakytovce, and then became the manager of FK Pohronie, and FK Železiarne Podbrezová. In January 2022, he became the new sporting director of Dukla Banská Bystrica.
