= Martin Poljovka =

Slovak footballer

Personal information
- Date of birth: 9 January 1975 (age 51)
- Place of birth: Banská Bystrica, Czechoslovakia
- Height: 1.73 m (5 ft 8 in)
- Position: Centre back

Youth career
- Dukla Banská Bystrica

Senior career*
Years	Team	Apps	(Gls)
1994–1999	Dukla Banská Bystrica	103	(2)
1999–2007	Spartak Trnava	169	(1)
2008–2013	Dukla Banská Bystrica	131	(3)
Total		403	(6)

International career
2004	Slovakia	2	(0)

Managerial career
- 2013-2017: Dukla Banská Bystrica (Sp.Director)
- 2017–2019: Podbrezová U19
- 2019–2020: Podbrezová
- 2021: FC Nitra Youth
- 2022-2024: Dukla Banská Bystrica U19
- 2025: Dukla Banská Bystrica
- 2026-: TJ Lovča
- * Club domestic league appearances and goals

Martin Poljovka (born 9 January 1975) is a Slovak football coach and former player. A defender by position, between 1995 and 2013 he made 403 appearances in the Slovak First Football League, playing for Dukla Banská Bystrica and Spartak Trnava, before returning for a second spell with Banská Bystrica. At international level, Poljovka represented his country twice, making two appearances for Slovakia in 2004. As a head coach Poljovka took charge of Dukla Banská Bystrica for six league matches in 2025, although the club lost each one and he was replaced after less than three months in the role.

== Club career ==
Poljovka made his first appearance in the Slovak First Football League in 1995, playing for Dukla Banská Bystrica. He later played for Spartak Trnava between 1999 and 2007. In March 2012, Poljovka became the player with the most appearances in the Slovak First League, after his 371st appearance surpassed the previous record of 370, held by Marek Ujlaky. He captained Dukla Banská Bystrica and finished his career after the 2012–13 Slovak First Football League season, having made a total of 403 appearances in the Slovak First Football League.

== International career ==
Poljovka made two appearances for Slovakia in 2004, both in the Kirin Cup. He started the 3–1 loss against Japan in Hiroshima on 9 July, playing 73 minutes before being replaced by substitute Rudolf Urban. Two days later he played the whole match as Slovakia fell to a 2–0 defeat against Serbia and Montenegro in Fukuoka.

== Coaching career ==
Poljovka was a youth coach at Podbrezová before taking on the role of assistant coach and interim head coach. He also worked with the Slovakia under-17 team as an assistant before being appointed head coach of Dukla Banská Bystrica in December 2024. After overseeing six league matches, all of which were losses, and a win against second-tier side Tatran Prešov in the 2024–25 Slovak Cup, Poljovka was replaced as head coach by Czech František Straka in March 2025.
