= Matej Grešák =

Slovak footballer

Personal information
- Full name: Matej Grešák
- Date of birth: 31 May 1999 (age 27)
- Place of birth: Tulčík, Slovakia
- Height: 1.75 m (5 ft 9 in)
- Position: Midfielder

Team information
- Current team: Železiarne Podbrezová
- Number: 14

Youth career
- –2011: TJ Družstevník Tulčík
- 2011–2013: FAMT Prešov
- 2013–2016: Tatran Prešov

Senior career*
Years	Team	Apps	(Gls)
2016–2018	Tatran Prešov	11	(0)
2018–2020	Poprad	27	(4)
2021–2025	Železiarne Podbrezová	92	(3)

International career
2016–2017	Slovakia U18	9	(4)
2018	Slovakia U20	2	(0)
- * Club domestic league appearances and goals as of 1 January 2025

Matej Grešák (born 31 May 1999) is a Slovak professional footballer who plays as a midfielder for Železiarne Podbrezová.

== Club career ==
=== 1. FC Tatran Prešov ===
Grešák made his Fortuna Liga debut for Tatran Prešov against ŽP Šport Podbrezová on 10 December 2016.
