= Marek Bažík =

Slovak footballer

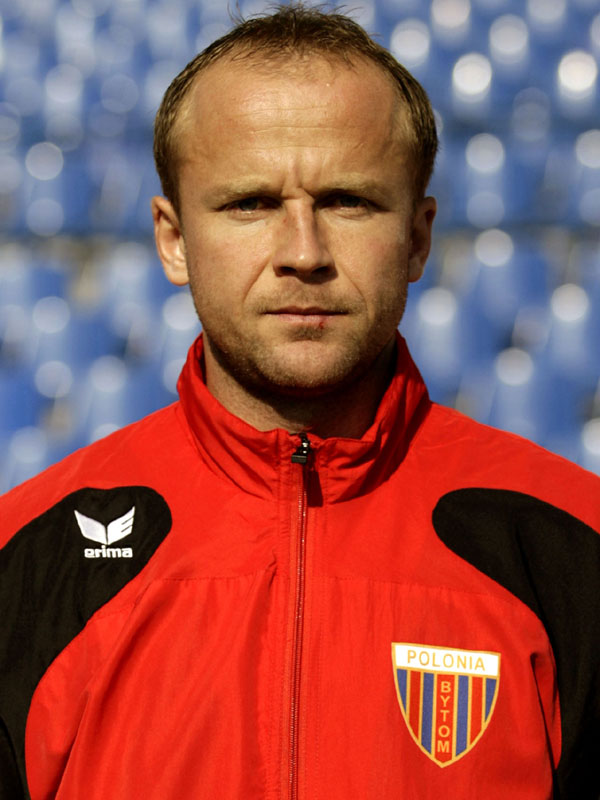
- Bažík in 2008

Personal information
- Date of birth: 9 February 1976 (age 50)
- Place of birth: Čačín, Czechoslovakia
- Height: 1.73 m (5 ft 8 in)
- Position: Midfielder

Team information
- Current team: Dukla Banská Bystrica & Slovakia U21 (assistant)

Senior career*
Years	Team	Apps	(Gls)
1993–1999	Dukla Banská Bystrica	133	(6)
1999–2001	ŠPORT Podbrezová		
2001–2005	Žilina	117	(22)
2005–2006	Dukla Banská Bystrica	51	(9)
2007	Viktoria Žižkov	12	(0)
2008–2011	Polonia Bytom	76	(7)
2011–2012	Banská Bystrica	21	(3)
2012	TSU Allhartsberg	16	(4)
2013–2014	Tvrdošín		

Managerial career
- 2018–2019: Slovakia U17
- 2021–2022: Slovakia U16
- 2022–2023: Slovakia U17
- 2023: Slovakia U15
- 2024: Dukla Banská Bystrica
- * Club domestic league appearances and goals

Marek Bažík (born 9 February 1976) is a Slovak professional football manager and former player. He is currently the assistant coach of Dukla Banská Bystrica and the Slovakia national under-21 team.
