= Radek Šiler =

Czech footballer (born 2004)

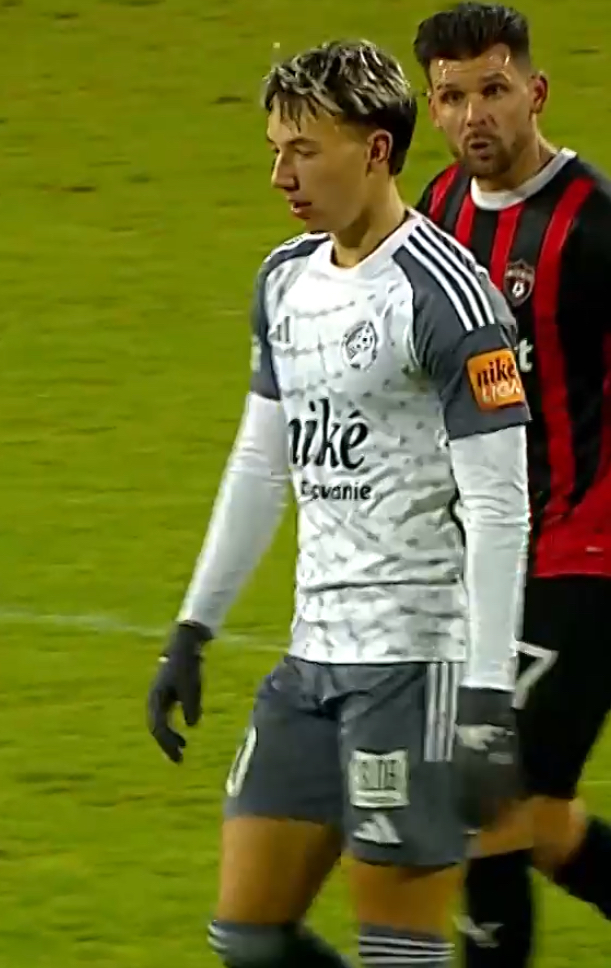
- Šiler (in white) playing for Podbrezová

Personal information
- Date of birth: 10 September 2004 (age 22)
- Place of birth: Neratovice, Czech Republic
- Height: 1.87 m (6 ft 2 in)
- Position: Forward

Team information
- Current team: Rio Ave

Youth career
- Sparta Prague
- Dukla Prague
- Meteor Prague
- Neratovice-Byškovice

Senior career*
Years	Team	Apps	(Gls)
2022	Neratovice-Byškovice		
2022–2024	Admira Prague	25	(14)
2024–2025	Sparta Prague	1	(0)
2024–2025	→ Sparta Prague B	29	(13)
2025	→ Teplice (loan)	9	(0)
2025–2026	Železiarne Podbrezová	37	(16)
2026–	Rio Ave	0	(0)

International career
2024–	Czech Republic U20	8	(0)
- * Club domestic league appearances and goals as of 17 May 2026

Radek Šiler (born 10 September 2004) is a Czech professional footballer who plays as a forward for Primeira Liga club Rio Ave.

Šiler was a youth futsal representative before signing a contract with AC Sparta Prague B. He played futsal for Olympik Mělník, scoring 6 goals in 7 games in the Czech Futsal First League.

== Club career ==
=== Early career ===
In the fall of 2016, the then eleven-year-old Šiler moved to Strahov, where he played in the academy with minor breaks until the summer of 2019. He subsequently became a regular player of Meteor Prague, from where he moved back to Neratovice a year later. He spent two seasons at the club playing in Division B, and in 2022 Šiler joined Czech 3rd tier club Admira Prague. in whose jersey he played in twenty-five matches, in which he managed to score fourteen goals. In the autumn of 2023, he scored eleven times in fifteen matches. He scored a hat trick in a 3–0 league win against FC Silon Táborsko.

=== Sparta Prague ===
In 2024, Šiler joined AC Sparta Prague B. In the Czech National Football League, he would score 13 times in 29 games. Šiler made his first league debut for the A-team of Sparta in a 1–1 draw in the league against Dukla Prague, coming off the bench in the 62nd minute of the game for Indrit Tuci.

==== Teplice (loan) ====
In the winter of 2025, Šiler joined fellow league outfit FK Teplice, signing on a year long loan. He made his debut for the club in a 2–0 loss to FC Viktoria Plzeň. Šiler played a total of 9 games for Teplice, in which he was not able to score a goal.

=== Podbrezová ===
In the summer of 2025, it was announced that Šiler would be joining Slovak club FK Železiarne Podbrezová, signing a 3 year-contract. He made his debut in the Slovak league in a 3–1 win against FC Košice, playing 68 minutes. Šiler scored the winning goal in a 2–0 win over league leaders MŠK Žilina, knocking them down to 2nd place. After the winter preparations on 7 February 2026, he scored a hat-trick in the first half of a 4–0 win against AS Trenčín, scoring the last goal of the game in the 48th minute.

=== Rio Ave ===
On 4 September 2026, Šiler signed a contract with Primeira Liga club Rio Ave until 2031.

== International career ==
While playing for the B-team of Sparta Prague, Šiler would get nominated to play two friendly matches for the Czech Republic national under-20 football team.
