= Vincent Chyla =

Slovak footballer (born 2004)

Personal information
- Date of birth: January 8, 2004 (age 22)
- Place of birth: Slovakia
- Height: 1.86 m (6 ft 1 in)
- Position: Centre midfielder

Team information
- Current team: Železiarne Podbrezová
- Number: 13

Youth career
- 2021–2023: MŠK Žilina

Senior career*
Years	Team	Apps	(Gls)
2023–2024	MŠK Žilina B	23	(1)
2024–	Železiarne Podbrezová	81	(2)

International career^{‡}
2025–	Slovakia U21	6	(0)
- * Club domestic league appearances and goals as of 21 September 2026 ‡ National team caps and goals as of 12 January 2026

Vincent Chyla (born 8 January 2004) is a Slovak football player who currently plays for Slovak First Football League club FK Železiarne Podbrezová, as a centre midfield.

He currently represents the Slovakia national under-21 football team.

== Club career ==
=== Early career ===
In 2014, Chyla joined the MŠK Žilina youth academy. He played in all of the youth categories. He would later play for the reserve team in the second league. Chyla scored his first goal for the B team in a 1–1 draw against ŠTK Šamorín.

=== Podbrezová ===
During the winter transfer window of 2024, Chyla joined first division side FK Železiarne Podbrezová. He made his debut for the club in a 2–1 win against Zemplín Michalovce, playing the full game. In the quarter-finals of the Slovak cup against Slovan Bratislava, Chyla would come on off the bench in the 77th minute with the score set at 1–1. He would score in the 84th minute, helping his team advance to the next round. On 20 January 2025, he signed an extension to his contract with Podbrezová. In May 2025, it was rumored that American club Seattle Sounders FC alongside clubs from Portugal, Netherlands and Hungary wanted to sign Chyla. He scored his first goal for Podbrezová on 14 February 2026, scoring the fourth goal of a 5–0 win against MFK Ružomberok in the 73rd minute.

== International career ==
=== Youth ===
Chyla would get his first international call-up for the Slovakia national under-21 football team in March 2025 for games against Germany and France. He debuted for the U21’s in a 1–0 loss against Germany, scoring on off the bench in the 88th minute for Dominik Hollý. He would also feature in the game against France U21. In 2025, Chyla was nominated as a back-up for the Slovakia U21 team ahead of the 2025 UEFA European Under-21 Championship. On 18 November 2025, he started in a 2027 UEFA European Under-21 Championship qualifying match against England U21.
