= Štefan Markulík =

Slovak football manager (born 1991)

Personal information
- Date of birth: 17 October 1991 (age 35)
- Place of birth: Slovakia

Team information
- Current team: Železiarne Podbrezová (manager); Slovakia (assistant)

Managerial career
- Years: Team
- 2012–2013: Spišská Nová Ves (youth)
- 2013–2018: Frauenfeld (youth)
- 2019–2021: Spišská Nová Ves
- 2024–2026: Železiarne Podbrezová
- 2025-: Slovakia (assistant)

Štefan Markulík (born 17 October 1991) is a Slovak professional football manager who manages Železiarne Podbrezová. He also serves as the assistant coach for the Slovakia national team.

== Early life ==
Markulík was born on 17 October 1991 in Slovakia and is a native of Spiš, Slovakia. Growing up, he attended Košice Sports School in Slovakia and then the University of Prešov in Slovakia.

== Managerial career ==
Markulík started his managerial career as a youth manager of Slovak side Spišská Nová Ves in 2012. In 2013, he was appointed as a youth manager of Swiss side Frauenfeld. Five years later, he returned to Spišská Nová Ves as an assistant manager, before being promoted to head coach of the club in 2019.

Following his stint there, he was appointed as an assistant manager of Slovak side Železiarne Podbrezová in 2021. During his 2021–22 season, he helped the club achieve promotion from the second tier to the top flight. Two seasons later, he helped them reach the semi-finals of the 2023–24 Slovak Cup and achieve fifth place in the league. Subsequently, he was promoted to their head coach in 2024.
