= Ridwan Sanusi =

Nigerian footballer

Personal information
- Date of birth: 21 September 2002 (age 24)
- Place of birth: Nigeria
- Height: 1.85 m (6 ft 1 in)
- Position: Winger

Team information
- Current team: Trenčín (on loan from Žilina)
- Number: 14

Senior career*
| Years | Team | Apps | (Gls) |
| –2021 | Obazz FC | | |
| 2021–2023 | Sereď | 8 | (0) |
| 2022 | → Trebišov (loan) | 12 | (0) |
| 2023 | → Pohronie (loan) | 11 | (2) |
| 2023–2024 | Podbrezová | 45 | (10) |
| 2025– | Žilina | 13 | (1) |
| 2025– | Žilina B | 3 | (1) |
| 2025–2026 | → Podbrezová (loan) | 23 | (0) |
| 2026– | → Trenčín (loan) | 1 | (0) |
- * Club domestic league appearances and goals as of 21 September 2026

Ridwan Sanusi (born 21 September 2002) is a Nigerian professional footballer who plays as a right-winger for Trenčín, on loan from MŠK Žilina.

== Club career ==
=== ŠKF Sereď ===
Sanusi made his professional Fortuna Liga debut for ŠKF Sereď against MFK Tatran Liptovský Mikuláš on 11 September 2021.

=== AS Trenčín ===
In August 2026, Sanusi joined Slovak club AS Trenčín on a season-long loan from MŠK Žilina, with the agreement including an option to make the transfer permanent. The move followed his previous loan spell with Podbrezová during the 2025–26 season.
