= Jakub Luka =

Slovak youth international footballer

Personal information
- Full name: Jakub Luka
- Date of birth: 18 August 2003 (age 23)
- Place of birth: Slovakia
- Height: 1.93 m (6 ft 4 in)
- Position: Centre-back

Team information
- Current team: Železiarne Podbrezová
- Number: 37

Youth career
- 2013–2016: Námestovo
- 2017–2020: Žilina
- 2021–: Ružomberok

Senior career*
Years	Team	Apps	(Gls)
2021–2024	Ružomberok	10	(0)
2023	→ Dolný Kubín (loan)	12	(0)
2024	→ Nõmme United (loan)	25	(1)
2025–	Železiarne Podbrezová	38	(1)

International career^{‡}
2021–2022	Slovakia U19	15	(0)
2022–	Slovakia U20	2	(0)
2023–	Slovakia U21	2	(0)
- * Club domestic league appearances and goals as of 21 September 2026 ‡ National team caps and goals as of 11:04, 11 June 2024 (UTC)

Jakub Luka (born 18 August 2003) is a Slovak professional footballer who currently plays for Niké liga club Železiarne Podbrezová as a defender.

== Club career ==
=== MFK Ružomberok ===
Luka signed a contract with MFK Ružomberok in January 2021, signing from MŠK Žilina Academy, where he played with the U19 team. Following his signing, he joined the first team of Ružomberok and expressed hope of making his senior debut during the spring and summer of 2021.

Luka made his Fortuna Liga debut for Ružomberok against Zemplín Michalovce on 1 May 2021 in a 1:2 away loss. He played the entire match.

== Private life ==
Luka had listed Milan Škriniar and Virgil van Dijk as his footballing idols.
