= Adam Danko =

Slovak footballer (born 2003)

Personal information
- Date of birth: 27 June 2003 (age 23)
- Place of birth: Slovakia
- Height: 1.86 m (6 ft 1 in)
- Position: Goalkeeper

Team information
- Current team: Kolding IF
- Number: 28

Youth career
- –2018: Banská Bystrica
- 2018–2019: Spartak Trnava
- 2019–2022: Železiarne Podbrezová

Senior career*
Years	Team	Apps	(Gls)
2022–2025	Železiarne Podbrezová	39	(0)
2023	FK Pohronie (loan)	10	(0)
2025–	Kolding IF	15	(0)

International career
2024	Slovakia U21	1	(0)
- * Club domestic league appearances and goals as of 2 June 2026

Adam Danko (born 27 June 2003) is a Slovak footballer who plays for Danish club Kolding IF as a Goalkeeper.

== Club career ==
=== Podbrezova ===
On 13 March 2024, in a cup match against league champions Slovan Bratislava, Danko would save a penalty, which would ultimately keep Podbrezová in the match which they won 3–1 and advanced to the semifinals of the competition.

Danko made his league debut in a 2—0 loss to FC Spartak Trnava on 14 April 2024.

In a European play-off against FC Košice which ended in a 2–2 draw, Danko would be substituted on for the penalty shootouts. He would save the last penalty taken by Miroslav Sovič, which would sent Podbrezová to the final of the playoffs.

=== Kolding IF ===
In the summer transfer window of 2025, Danko joined Danish 1st Division club Kolding IF, signing a four year contract.

== International career ==
Danko received his first international call up to the Slovak U21 team for games against Portugal U21 and Netherlands U21. He was called up to the team in August 2024, however, due to injury, he did not travel to Cyprus, where the U-21 national team played a friendly match against Belarus.
