= Železiarne Podbrezová =

Železiarne Podbrezová a.s.
- Type: Public
- Industry: Steel
- Founded: 1840
- Headquarters: Podbrezová, Slovakia
- Key people: Vladimír Soták (Chairman)
- Products: Steel, pipes, automotive
- Revenue: ▼€ 222 million (2015)
- Net income: ▼€ 3.7 million (2015)
- Number of employees: 3,173 (2015)
- Parent: Reichswerke AG für Waffen-und Maschinenbau Hermann Göring
- Subsidiaries: Žiaromat, Transmesa; ŽP EKO Qelet, Tále a.s.
- Website: zelpo.sk steeltube.sk

Železiarne Podbrezová a.s. (ŽP) (English: Podbrezová Iron Works) is a Slovak company headquartered in Podbrezová. ŽP specializes in steel tubes and automotive parts. The company has 3,173 employees (2015).

Železiarne Podbrezová
