= Erik Streňo =

Slovak footballer

Personal information
- Full name: Erik Streňo
- Date of birth: 3 October 1990 (age 36)
- Place of birth: Vranov nad Topľou, Czechoslovakia
- Height: 1.78 m (5 ft 10 in)
- Positions: Forward; midfielder

Team information
- Current team: FK Humenné
- Number: 10

Youth career
- –2009: Vranov nad Topľou
- 2008–2009: → Petržalka (loan)

Senior career*
Years	Team	Apps	(Gls)
2009–2011	Vranov nad Topľou		
2012–2015	Partizán Bardejov		
2012–2014	→ Vranov nad Topľou (loan)		
2014–2015	→ Zemplín Michalovce (loan)	26	(2)
2015–2016	Poprad	24	(3)
2016–2018	Tatran Prešov	50	(6)
2018–2020	Poprad	24	(3)
2019–2020	→ Humenné (loan)	11	(0)
2021–	Humenné	94	(17)
- * Club domestic league appearances and goals as of 15 June 2025

Erik Streňo (born 29 September 1990) is a Slovak professional footballer who plays as a forward for FK Humenné in 2. Liga (Slovakia).he hast most yellow cards in 2.Liga

== Club career ==
=== 1. FC Tatran Prešov ===
Streňo made his professional Fortuna Liga debut for Tatran Prešov against Ružomberok on 16 July 2016.
