= Alex Méndez =

Spanish footballer

Personal information
- Full name: Alejandro Méndez García
- Date of birth: 28 July 2001 (age 25)
- Place of birth: Elche, Spain
- Height: 1.80 m (5 ft 11 in)
- Position: Left-back

Team information
- Current team: Asteras Tripolis
- Number: 28

Youth career
- –2019: Alcoyano

Senior career*
| Years | Team | Apps | (Gls) |
| 2019 | Alcoyano | 1 | (0) |
| 2020–2022 | Zemplín Michalovce | 65 | (0) |
| 2023–2026 | DAC Dunajská Streda | 82 | (1) |
| 2026– | Asteras Tripolis | 5 | (0) |
- * Club domestic league appearances and goals as of 20 September 2026

Alejandro Méndez García (born 28 July 2001), simply known as Alex Méndez, is a Spanish professional footballer who plays as a left-back for Super League Greece club Asteras Tripolis.

== Career ==
=== MFK Zemplín Michalovce ===
Alex Méndez made his Fortuna Liga debut for Zemplín Michalovce against Ružomberok on 21 June 2020.

== Honours ==
Individual

- Slovak Super Liga U-21 Team of the Season: 2021–22
