= René Paraj =

Slovak footballer

Personal information
- Full name: René Paraj
- Date of birth: 14 August 1992 (age 34)
- Place of birth: Žiar nad Hronom, Czechoslovakia
- Position: Midfielder

Team information
- Current team: Železiarne Podbrezová
- Number: 15

Senior career*
Years	Team	Apps	(Gls)
–2012	Lokomotíva Zvolen		
2012–2018	FK Pohronie	186	(17)
2019–	Železiarne Podbrezová	187	(11)
- * Club domestic league appearances and goals as of 21 September 2026

René Paraj (born 14 August 1992) is a Slovak footballer who plays for Železiarne Podbrezová as a midfielder.

== Club career ==
=== FK Pohronie ===
Paraj collected almost 200 league caps for Pohronie across 3. Liga and 2. Liga, scoring 17 league goals. While with the club, he contributed to its promotion from 3. Liga.

He made his 2. Liga debut for Pohronie against FO ŽP Šport Podbrezová, in an away fixture, on 20 July 2013. Pohronie lost 1:0, after a goal by a former international Michal Pančík. Paraj completed 66 minutes of the game before being replaced by Martin Sedliak.

=== FK Železiarne Podbrezová ===
Paraj made his professional debut for Železiarne Podbrezová against Nitra on 16 February 2019. Paraj replaced injured Jozef Pastorek in the stoppage time of the first half.

== Honours ==
Pohronie

- 3. Liga: 2012–13
