= Peter Kováčik =

Slovak under-21 international footballer

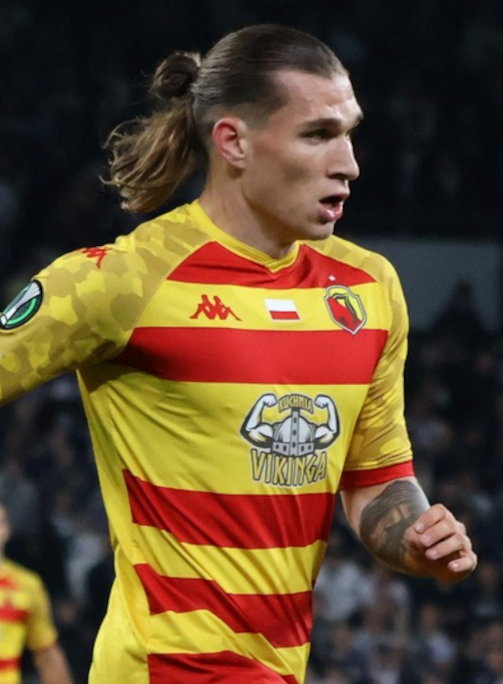
- Kováčik in 2024 with Jagiellonia Białystok

Personal information
- Date of birth: 1 December 2001 (age 24)
- Place of birth: Banská Bystrica, Slovakia
- Height: 1.79 m (5 ft 10 in)
- Positions: Right midfielder; right-back

Team information
- Current team: Železiarne Podbrezová
- Number: 77

Youth career
- –2016: Hamsik Academy
- 2016–2019: Železiarne Podbrezová

Senior career*
Years	Team	Apps	(Gls)
2019–2024	Železiarne Podbrezová	106	(15)
2024–2025	Como	0	(0)
2024–2025	→ Jagiellonia Białystok (loan)	8	(0)
2025	→ Železiarne Podbrezová (loan)	12	(3)
2025–	Železiarne Podbrezová	33	(11)

International career^{‡}
2021–2022	Slovakia U21	11	(0)
2026–	Slovakia	1	(0)
- * Club domestic league appearances and goals as of 21 September 2026 ‡ National team caps and goals as of 1 June 2026

Peter Kováčik (born 1 December 2001) is a Slovak professional footballer who plays as a right midfielder or right-back for Niké Liga club Železiarne Podbrezová and the Slovakia national team.

== Club career ==
=== Železiarne Podbrezová ===
Kováčik made his professional debut for Železiarne Podbrezová against Slovan Bratislava on 16 July 2022.

=== Como ===
In June 2024, his transfer to Serie A side Como 1907 was announced.

==== Loan to Jagiellonia Białystok ====
On 4 September 2024, his loan to Jagiellonia Białystok on a one-year deal was announced. After being assigned squad number 22, he made his debut in a 3–2 victory over Lechia Gdańsk on 21 September 2024. On 4 February 2025, his loan was terminated.

==== Loan to Železiarne ====
On 6 February 2025, Kováčik returned to Železiarne Podbrezová for the remainder of the season.

== Career statistics ==
=== International ===
As of match played 1 June 2026

Appearances and goals by national team and year
National team	Year	Apps	Goals
Slovakia	2026	1	0
Total		1	0
