= FK Železiarne Podbrezová =

Slovak football club

Podbrezová
- Full name: Futbalový klub Železiarne Podbrezová
- Nicknames: Železiari (Ironmongers); Horehronci (People from Upper Hron Region)
- Founded: 1920; 106 years ago as RTJ Podbrezová
- Ground: ZELPO Aréna
- Capacity: 4,061
- Owner(s): Železiarne Podbrezová a.s. 35% Stanislav Lobotka 35% Other investors 30%
- President: Július Kriváň
- Manager: Boris Godál (Interim)
- League: Slovak First Football League
- 2025–26: Slovak First Football League, 6th of 12
- Website: www.zpfutbal.sk
Home colours	Away colours	Third colours

FK Železiarne Podbrezová (Slovak pronunciation: [ˈʐelezɪɐrɲe ˈpɔdbrezɔʋaː]) is a Slovak football team, based in the village of Podbrezová.

== History ==
Podbrezová was formed in 1920 as RTJ Podbrezová. The club is also particularly famous for its youth program that has produced many Slovak talents over the years, including Juraj Kucka, Michal Breznaník, Róbert Pich, Peter Štyvar and Marek Bažík. Podbrezová has been cooperating with the Italian club Inter, in a worldwide social project – Inter Campus (2002–2008). Argentine midfielder Pablo Podio, who played for Podbrezová, is a product of the Inter Campus project. Major achievements in the history of the club include: second place in the I. liga in the 2007/2008 season and the semifinals of the Slovak Cup in the 2001/2002 season. In 2009–10, the club withdrew from the Slovak First League.

=== Slovak First Football League promotion ===
In 2013–14, Podbrezová were promoted to the top flight of Slovak football for the first time in their history. The success was born under the leadership of coach Jaroslav Kentoš. The keys players were Vratislav Greško, Blažej Vaščák, Jozef Hanák, Michal Pančík and others.

=== Events timeline ===
- 1920 – Founded as RTJ Podbrezová
- 1930 – Merged with Tatran Horná Lehota and renamed ŠK Podbrezová
- 1936 – Renamed ŠKP Podbrezová
- 2006 – Merged with FK Brezno and renamed FO ŽP Šport Podbrezová
- 2017 – Renamed FK Železiarne Podbrezová

== Affiliated clubs ==
The following clubs are affiliated with Podbrezová:

- (Turkey) Kardemir Karabükspor (2017–)
- (Slovakia) FK Poprad (2021–)
- (Denmark) FC Nordsjælland (2019–)
- (Slovakia) FK Pohronie (2022–)
- (Slovakia) Baník Kalinovo (2022–2024)

== Honours ==
=== Domestic ===
- Slovak Second Division (1993–)
  - Champions (2): 2013–14, 2021–22
  - Runners-up (3): 2007–08, 2011–12, 2012–13

== Transfers ==
FK have produced numerous players that have gone on to represent the Slovak national football team. Over the last period there has been a steady increase of young players leaving Podbrezová after a few years of first-team football and moving on to play football in bigger Slovak clubs (Juraj Kucka to MFK Ružomberok in 2007, Michal Breznaník to ŠK Slovan Bratislava in 2007, Mahmudu Bajo to Dunajská Streda in 2024, Jakub Kiwior to MŠK Žilina in 2019) and European clubs of a higher standard (Peter Kováčik to Italian Como 1907 in 2024 and Roland Galčík and Radek Šiler to Portuguese Rio Ave F.C. in 2026). The same year moved also Patrik Blahút and Richard Ludha to Czech league 1. FC Slovácko and FK Teplice.. The top transfer was agreed in 2024 when 20 years old forward Moses Cobnan moved to Russian FC Krasnodar for a fee €1.75 million.

=== Record transfers ===
Rank	Player	To	Fee	Year
1.	(Nigeria) Moses Cobnan	(Russia) FC Krasnodar	€1.75 million	2023
2.	(Czech Republic) Radek Šiler	(Portugal) Rio Ave	€1.6 million	2026
3.	(The Gambia) Alasana Yirajang	(Slovakia) Slovan Bratislava	€1 million	2025
4.	(Slovakia) Filip Mielke	(Czech Republic) FC Hradec Králové	€700.000	2026
5.	(Slovakia) Peter Kováčik	(Italy) Como 1907	€600.000	2024
6.	(Nigeria) Ridwan Sanusi	(Slovakia) MŠK Žilina	€450.000	2025
7.	(The Gambia) Mahmudu Bajo	(Slovakia) Dunajská Streda	€350.000	2024
8.	(Poland) Jakub Kiwior	(Slovakia) MŠK Žilina	€250.000	2019
9.	(Ghana) Mark Assinor	(Ukraine) LNZ Cherkasy	€230.000	2024

*-unofficial fee

== Sponsorship ==
Period	Kit manufacturer	Shirt sponsor
1998–1999	Puma	none
1999–2001	ATAK Sportswear	none
2001–2002	NIKE	Železiarne Podbrezová
2002–2004	NIKE	ŽP Trade
2004–2005	Puma	none
2005–2006	NIKE	ŽP Trade
2006–2007	ALEA	none
2007–2010	Jako	Železiarne Podbrezová
2010–2022	Adidas	Železiarne Podbrezová
2022–present	Adidas	Niké

=== Club partners ===
- Železiarne Podbrezová
- Zaninoni
- ŽDAS
- SLOVRUR
- Moravia Steel
- REA-S
- Pipex Italia

== Current squad ==
As of 21 September 2026 Note: Flags indicate national team as defined under FIFA eligibility rules; some limited exceptions apply. Players may hold more than one non-FIFA nationality.

No.	Pos.	Nation	Player
5	DF	SLO	Rene Lampreht
6	MF	NGR	Samson Tijani (on loan from (Czech Republic) Dukla Prague)
7	FW	GEO	Luka Silagadze
8	MF	CZE	Ondřej Deml
9	MF	SVK	Martin Chrien
11	FW	MNE	Balša Mrvaljević
13	MF	SVK	Vincent Chyla
14	MF	UKR	Maksym Khyminets
15	DF	SVK	René Paraj
17	MF	GHA	Alexander Amoafo
19	DF	GAM	Saidy Saibo
20	DF	SVK	Ján Krivák

No.	Pos.	Nation	Player
23	MF	SVK	Šimon Faško
25	DF	CZE	Radek Kejval
26	MF	SVK	Samuel Štefánik
27	FW	CRO	Karlo Miljanić
31	GK	SVK	Martin Trnovský
33	FW	SVK	Michal Duraj
37	DF	SVK	Jakub Luka
41	GK	SVK	Ivan Rehák
66	MF	SVK	Matúš Rusnák (on loan from (Czech Republic) Baník Ostrava)
70	GK	SVK	Lukáš Domanisky
77	MF	SVK	Peter Kováčik

For recent transfers, see List of Slovak football transfers summer 2026

=== Out on loan ===
Note: Flags indicate national team as defined under FIFA eligibility rules; some limited exceptions apply. Players may hold more than one non-FIFA nationality.

No.	Pos.	Nation	Player
6	DF	GHA	Ebenezer Kpozo (at Humenné until 30 June 2027)
12	MF	SVK	Tobiáš Diviš (at Sandecja Nowy Sącz until 30 June 2027)

No.	Pos.	Nation	Player
44	MF	UKR	Andriy Havrylenko (at Komárno until 30 June 2027)
—	GK	SVK	Matej Jurička (at IF Gnistan until 31 December 2026)

== Staff ==
=== Current technical staff ===
As of 6 July 2024

Staff	Job title
(Slovakia) Boris Godál	Manager
(Poland) Kamil Wilczek	Assistant manager
(Canada) Dominic Rajna	Assistant manager
(Slovakia) Miroslav Poliaček	General Manager
(Slovakia) František Kunzo	Team Leader
(Slovakia) Miroslav Seman	Goalkeeping coach
(Slovakia) Ernest Caban	Team Doctor
(Slovakia) Richard Horňák	Fitness coach
(Slovakia) Dárius Kolodzej	Masseur

=== Club officials ===
Position	Name
President	(Slovakia) Július Kriváň
Vice president	(Slovakia) Marián Kurčík
Vice president	(Slovakia) Vladimír Soták ml.

== Results ==
=== League and Cup history ===
Slovak League only (1993–present)

Year	Division (name)	Position	Domestic cup	Top scorer (goals)
2003–04	(III) 2. liga	1	Round 1	?
2004–05	(II) 1. liga	4th	Round 1	?
2005–06	(II) 1. liga	9/16	Round 2	?
2006–07	(II) 1. liga	8/12	Round 1	?
2007–08	(II) 1. liga	2/12	Round 1	(Slovakia) Róbert Tomko (13)
2008–09	(II) 1. liga	3/12	Round 2	?
2009–10	(II) 1. liga	12/12	Round 2	?
2010–11	(III) 2. liga	1/12	Round 3	?
2011–12	(II) 2. liga	2/12	Round 2	(Nigeria) Hector Tubonemi (11)
2012–13	(II) 2. liga	2/12	Round 2	(Nigeria) Hector Tubonemi (19)
2013–14	(II) 2. liga	1/12	Round 2	(Slovakia) Štefan Gerec (15)
2014–15	(I) Fortuna Liga	11/12	Round 3	(Slovakia) Blažej Vaščák (7)
2015–16	(I) Fortuna Liga	8/12	Round 4	4 players (5)
2016–17	(I) Fortuna Liga	5/12	Round 4	(Netherlands) Endy Opoku (7)
2017–18	(I) Fortuna Liga	9/12	Round 5	(Netherlands) Endy Opoku (5)
2018–19	(I) Fortuna Liga	12/12	Round of 16	(Slovakia) Dávid Leško (8)
2019–20	(II) 2.liga	4/16	Round 3	(Slovakia) Martin Pribula (5)
2020–21	(II) 2.liga	4/15	Round 4	(Slovakia) Roland Galčík (11)
2021–22	(II) 2.liga	1/16	Round 4	(Slovakia) Daniel Pavúk (16)
2022–23	(I) Fortuna Liga	4/12	Semi-finals	(Nigeria) Moses Cobnan (9)
2023–24	(I) Niké Liga	6/12	Semi-finals	(Nigeria) Ridwan Sanusi (7)
2024–25	(I) Niké Liga	6/12	Round of 16	(The Gambia) Alasana Yirajang (9)
2025–26	(I) Niké Liga	6/12	Semi-finals	(Czech Republic) Radek Šiler (13)

== Player records ==
=== Most goals ===
#	Nat.	Name	Goals
1	(Slovakia)	Roland Galčík	50
2	(Slovakia)	Daniel Pavúk	34
3	(Slovakia)	**Peter Kováčik**	28
4	(Slovakia)	Blažej Vaščák	22
5	(Slovakia)	Michal Breznaník	21

Players whose name is listed in bold are still active.

== Notable players ==
Had international caps for their respective countries

For full list, see Category:ŽP Šport Podbrezová players

- (Romania) Marius Alexe
- (The Gambia) **Mahmudu Bajo**
- (Slovakia) David Depetris
- (Slovakia) Michal Faško
- (Slovakia) **Roland Galčík**
- (Slovakia) Vratislav Greško
- (Slovakia) Filip Hlohovský
- (Slovakia) Martin Chrien
- (Slovakia) Juraj Chvátal
- (Poland) Jakub Kiwior
- (Slovakia) **Peter Kováčik**
- (Slovakia) **Ján Krivák**
- (Slovakia) Juraj Kucka
- (Czechoslovakia) Milan Nemec
- (Slovakia) Branislav Niňaj
- (Estonia) Kevor Palumets
- (Slovakia) Michal Pančík
- (North Macedonia) **Dejan Peševski**
- (Slovakia) Štefan Rusnák
- (Slovakia) Pavol Šafranko
- (Niger) Siradji Sani
- (Slovakia) Samuel Štefánik
- (Slovakia) Peter Štyvar
- (Central African Republic) **Séverin Tatolna**
- (Nigeria) Samson Tijani
- (Slovakia) Blažej Vaščák
- (Poland) Mateusz Zachara

== Notable managers ==
- (Slovakia) Milan Nemec (1998–2001)
- (Slovakia) Ladislav Kuna (2001–04)
- (Slovakia) Anton Jánoš (15 Aug 2006 – 31 May 2008)
- (Italy) Raffaele Quaranta (1 June 2008 – 11 Oct 2010)
- (Slovakia) Jaroslav Kentoš (2011 – Febr 2015)
- (Slovakia) Jozef Mores (Febr 2015 – June 2015)
- (Slovakia) Zdenko Frťala (15 June 2015 – 22 Sept 2015)
- (Slovakia) Marek Fabuľa (22 Sept 2015 – 25 April 2017)
- (Slovakia) Karol Praženica (25 April 2017 - 20 Sept 2017)
- (Slovakia) Marek Fabuľa (20 Sept 2017 – 21 Nov 2018)
- (Slovakia) Gergely Geri (21 Nov 2018 – 4 Jan 2019)
- (Slovakia) Vladimír Veselý (4 Jan 2019 – 26 Aug 2019)
- (Slovakia) Jozef Mores (26 Aug 2019 – 6 March 2020)
- (Slovakia) Martin Poljovka (6 March 2020 – 1 June 2020)
- (Slovakia) Vladimír Cifranič (1 June 2020 – 4 Dec 2020)
- (Slovakia) Mikuláš Radványi (17 Dec 2020 – 28 May 2021)
- (Czech Republic) Roman Skuhravý (28 May 2021 – 6 July 2024)
- (Slovakia) Vladimír Cifranič (12 July 2024-2 Sept 2024)
- (Slovakia) Štefan Markulík (2 Sept 2024-23 Oct 2026)
- (Slovakia) Boris Godál (interim) (23 Oct 2026-)
