= Šimon Faško =

Slovak footballer (born 2006)

Personal information
- Full name: Šimon Faško
- Date of birth: 9 April 2006 (age 20)
- Place of birth: Brezno, Slovakia
- Height: 1.83 m (6 ft 0 in)
- Position: Midfielder

Team information
- Current team: Železiarne Podbrezová
- Number: 25

Youth career
- –2015: ŠK Partizán Čierny Balog
- 2015–2023: Železiarne Podbrezová

Senior career*
Years	Team	Apps	(Gls)
2023–	Železiarne Podbrezová	60	(2)

International career^{‡}
2022–	Slovakia U17	3	(0)
- * Club domestic league appearances and goals as of 21 September 2026 ‡ National team caps and goals as of 25 October 2022

Šimon Faško (born 9 April 2006) is a Slovak footballer who plays for Železiarne Podbrezová as a midfielder.

== Club career ==
He started his career at his hometown club ŠK Partizán Čierny Balog. He moved to Podbrezová at the age of 9.

=== FK Železiarne Podbrezová ===
Reprezentácia: 3 roky Faško made his professional debut for Železiarne Podbrezová at the age of 16 years, 10 months and 2 days, against FC ViOn Zlaté Moravce on 11 February 2023.

== Personal life ==
His older brother Michal is also footballer, currently playing for MFK Dukla Banská Bystrica.
