= Podbrezová =

- Municipality

- Flag

- Location of Podbrezová in the Banská Bystrica Region Location of Podbrezová in Slovakia
- Coordinates: 48.82°N 19.53°E
- Country: Slovakia
- Region: Banská Bystrica Region
- District: Brezno District
- First mentioned: 1953

Area
  - Total: 18.55 km^{2} (7.16 sq mi)
- Elevation: 476 m (1,562 ft)

Population (2025)
  - Total: 3,445
- Time zone: UTC+1 (CET)
  - Summer (DST): UTC+2 (CEST)
- Postal code: 976 81
- Area code: +421 48
- Vehicle registration plate (until 2022): BR
- Website: www.podbrezova.sk

Podbrezová (Slovak pronunciation: [ˈpɔdbrezɔʋaː], Hungarian: Zólyombrézó) is a large village and municipality in Brezno District, in the Banská Bystrica Region of central Slovakia, around 10 km west of the district seat town, Brezno.

== History ==
The village is actually made of six former independent settlements, which were grouped in the 19th century around a new mill - the Hron iron works.

== Geography ==
The municipality lies at an altitude of 476 metres (1,562 ft) and covers an area of 18.55 km^{2} (7.16 sq mi) (2025).

== Sport ==
=== Football ===
Podbrezová has a football club FK Železiarne Podbrezová which currently plays in the Slovak First Football League. Home games are played in the ZELPO Aréna, located in Podbrezová with a capacity of 4,000 seats, about 500 more of the city population.

== Population ==
Population statistic (10 years)
Year	1995	2005	2015	2025
Count	4148	4176	3926	3445
Difference		+0.67%	−5.98%	−12.25%

Population statistic
Year	2024	2025
Count	3470	3445
Difference		−0.72%

It has a population of 3445 people (31 December 2025).

=== Ethnicity ===
Census 2021 (1+ %)
Ethnicity	Number	Fraction
Slovak	3286	90.72%
Not found out	301	8.31%
Romani	51	1.4%
Total	3622	

In year 2021 was 3622 people by ethnicity 3286 as Slovak, 301 as Not found out, 51 as Romani, 34 as Czech, 12 as Hungarian, 10 as Other, 5 as Russian, 4 as Rusyn, 2 as Italian, 2 as German, 2 as Albanian, 1 as Irish, 1 as Ukrainian, 1 as Serbian, 1 as Silesian, 1 as Romanian and 1 as Croatian.

Note on population: The difference values of population numbers in the table "Population statistic" and in the sections "Ethnicity" & "Religion" is caused by the use of various statistical methods.

=== Religion ===
Census 2021 (1+ %)
Religion	Number	Fraction
Roman Catholic Church	1759	48.56%
None	1252	34.57%
Not found out	342	9.44%
Evangelical Church	165	4.56%
Total	3622	

In year 2021 was 3622 people by religion 1759 from Roman Catholic Church, 1252 from None, 342 from Not found out, 165 from Evangelical Church, 32 from Greek Catholic Church, 19 from Christian Congregations in Slovakia, 12 from Ad hoc movements, 11 from Other, 6 from Paganism and natural spirituality, 5 from Islam, 5 from Buddhism, 4 from Other and not ascertained christian church, 2 from Baptists Church, 1 from Old Catholic Church, 1 from Calvinist Church, 1 from Eastern Orthodox Church, 1 from Hinduism, 1 from United Methodist Church, 1 from Seventh-day Adventist Church, 1 from Church of Jesus Christ of Latter-day Saints and 1 from Apostolic Church.
