= ZELPO Aréna =

Football stadium in Podbrezová, Slovakia

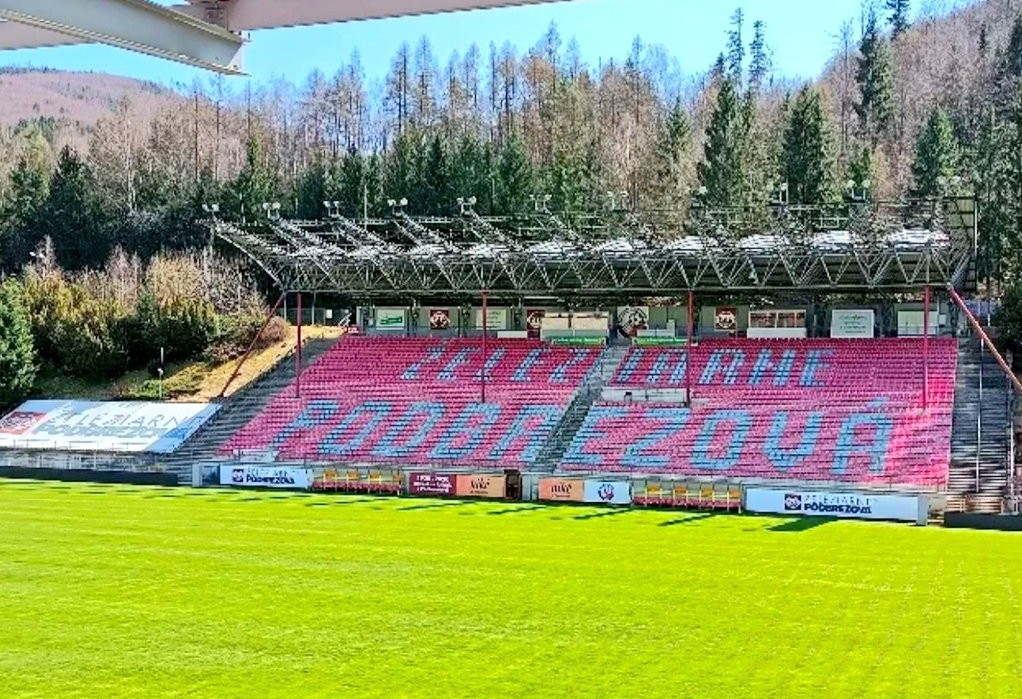
- UEFA
- Interactive map of ZELPO Aréna
- Former names: Stadium Kolkáreň
- Location: Kolkáreň 58, Podbrezová, Slovakia
- Owner: Železiarne Podbrezová
- Operator: ŽP Šport Podbrezová
- Capacity: 4,000
- Surface: Grass
- Scoreboard: LED
- Field size: 105 x 68 m

Construction
- Opened: 1959
- Renovated: 2012, 2014–2015

Tenant
- ŽP Šport Podbrezová

ZELPO Aréna is a home football stadium in Podbrezová, Slovakia. It is currently used mostly for football matches and is the home ground of ŽP Šport Podbrezová. The stadium holds 4,000 people. The intensity of the floodlighting is 1,200 lux.

== Construction ==
In 2013, a project to modernize football stadiums in Slovakia began, for which the Slovak government allocated a total subsidy of 45 million euros over 10 years (4.5 million per year). The total amount for ŽP ŠPORT should be 750,000 euros. The club began the reconstruction of the roof of the grandstand and the visitors' sector. The roof was modified to be movable and retractable (the original one blocked the sun's rays on the pitch). New television cameras were added and the visitors' sector was renovated.

The reconstruction continued after the 2014/15 season, with sidewalks and access roads being completed, work on the hot water supply for heating, installation of turnstiles and other equipment. On Saturday 22 August 2015, the stadium was officially opened after reconstruction under its new official name, ZELPO Arena, in a Fortuna League match against TJ Spartak Myjava. Spectators had free admission to the match, in which Podbrezová lost 1:2 to Myjava.

== Image gallery ==
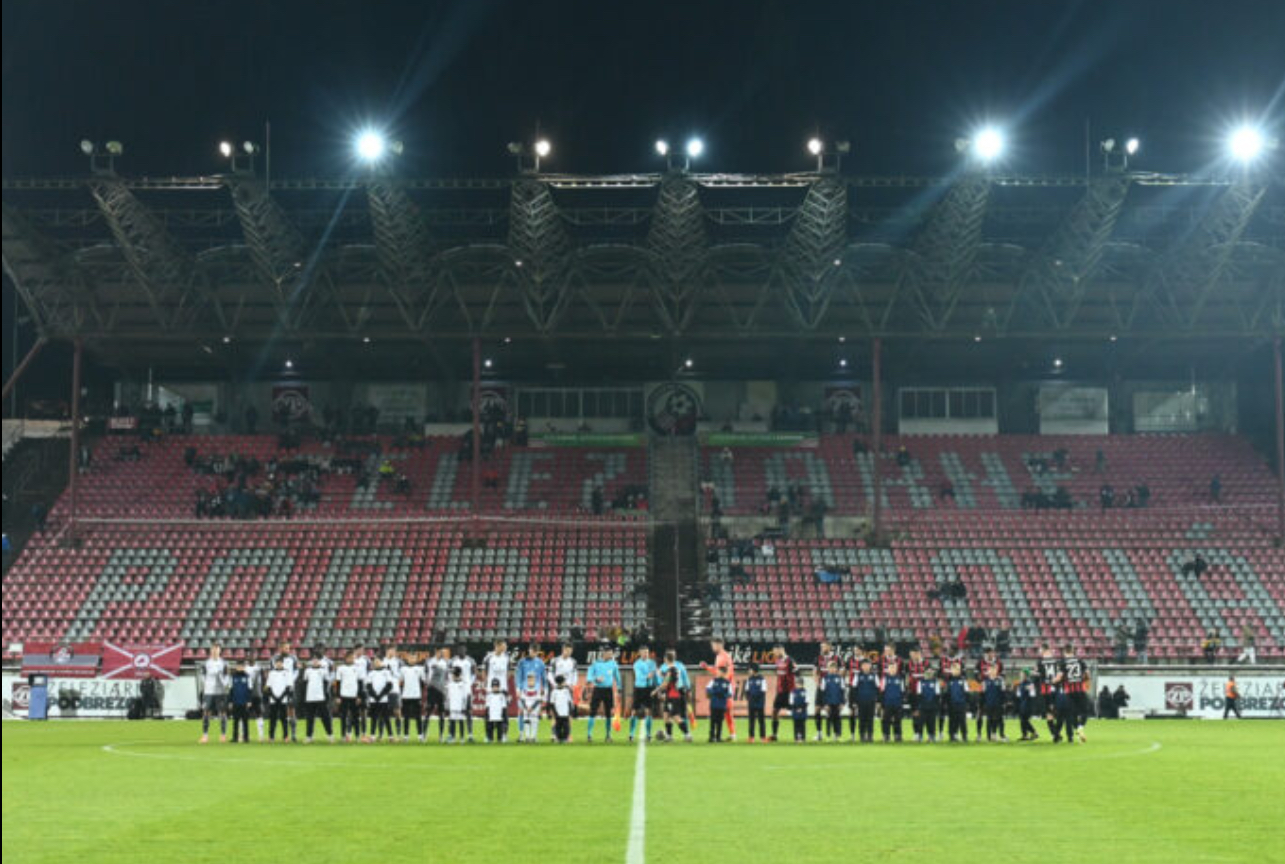
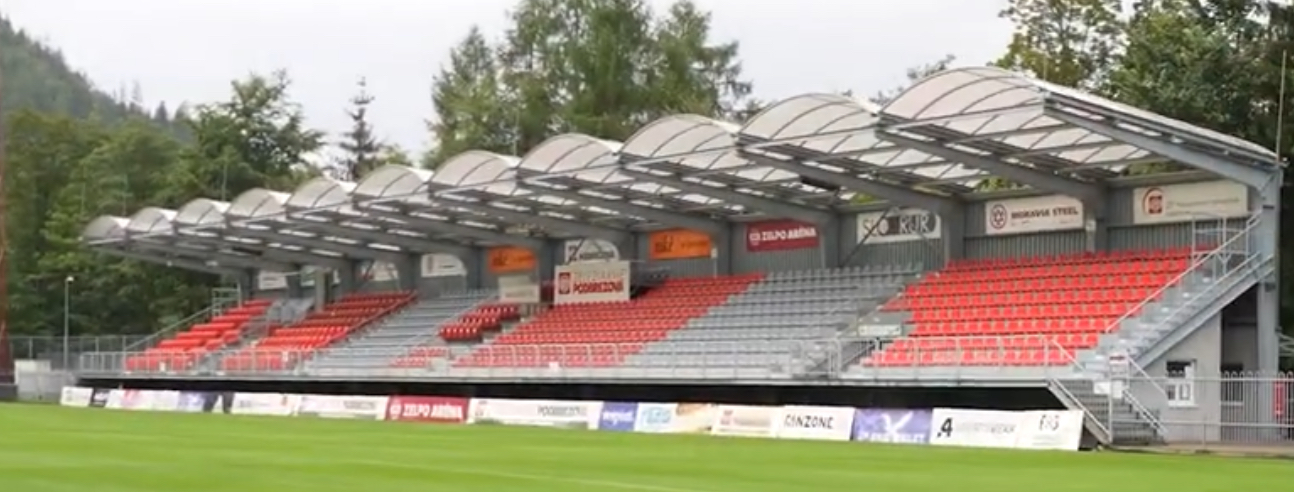
