= Roland Galčík =

Slovak under-21 international footballer

Personal information
- Date of birth: 13 July 2001 (age 25)
- Place of birth: Námestovo, Slovakia
- Height: 1.73 m (5 ft 8 in)
- Position: Midfielder

Team information
- Current team: Rio Ave
- Number: 30

Youth career
- 2010–2015: TJ Tatran Klin
- 2012: → Námestovo (loan)
- 2015–2016: Námestovo
- 2016–2018: Železiarne Podbrezová

Senior career*
| Years | Team | Apps | (Gls) |
| 2018–2021 | Železiarne Podbrezová | 69 | (20) |
| 2022–2023 | Žilina | 32 | (4) |
| 2022–2023 | Žilina B | 4 | (3) |
| 2022 | → Železiarne Podbrezová (loan) | 13 | (9) |
| 2023–2026 | Železiarne Podbrezová | 81 | (21) |
| 2026– | Rio Ave | 6 | (1) |

International career^{‡}
| 2021–2022 | Slovakia U21 | 13 | (1) |
| 2026– | Slovakia | 2 | (1) |
- * Club domestic league appearances and goals as of 14 September 2026 ‡ National team caps and goals as of 5 June 2026

Roland Galčík (born 13 July 2001) is a Slovak professional footballer who plays for Primeira Liga club Rio Ave and the Slovakia national team.

== Club career ==
=== FK Železiarne Podbrezová ===
Galčík made his Fortuna Liga debut for Železiarne Podbrezová in an away fixture against DAC Dunajská Streda on 20 October 2018, coming on as a late second-half replacement for Matúš Turňa with the final score already set at 3–2.

=== Rio Ave ===
On 16 July 2026, Galčík signed a four-year contract with Rio Ave in Portugal.

== International career ==
Galčík was first recognised in a senior national team nomination on 16 March 2022 by Štefan Tarkovič as an alternate ahead of two international friendly fixtures against Norway and Finland. During the March international fixtures, Galčík ended up representing the Slovak U21 side under Jaroslav Kentoš in 2023 Under-21 European Championship qualifiers against Northern Ireland and Spain, being called up on the 17 March.

=== International ===
As of match played 5 June 2026

Appearances and goals by national team and year
| National team | Year | Apps | Goals |
|---|---|---|---|
| Slovakia | 2026 | 2 | 1 |
| Total | | 2 | 1 |

Scores and results list Slovakia's goal tally first, score column indicates score after each Galčík goal.

List of international goals scored by Roland Galčík
| No. | Date | Venue | Opponent | Score | Result | Competition |
|---|---|---|---|---|---|---|
| 1 | 1 June 2026 | MOL Aréna, Dunajská Streda, Slovakia | Malta | 2–1 | 2–1 | Friendly |
