= 2025–26 MFK Ružomberok season =

Ružomberok
2025–26 season
- Manager: Ondřej Smetana (until 12 January 2026); Jaroslav Köstl (from 13 January 2026)
- Stadium: Štadión pod Čebraťom
- Slovak First Football League: 10th
- Slovak Cup: Round of 16
- Top goalscorer: League: Jan Hladík (5); All: Jan Hladík (9)
- Highest home attendance: 1,567 v Žilina (31 August 2025, Slovak First Football League)
- Lowest home attendance: 543 v Trenčín (13 December 2025, Slovak First Football League)
- Average home league attendance: 1,111
- Biggest win: 7–0 v Kežmarok (Away, 24 September 2025, Slovak Cup)
- Biggest defeat: 0–5 v Podbrezová (Away, 14 February 2026, Slovak First Football League)
Home colours	Away colours

The 2025–26 season was Mestský Futbalový klub Ružomberok's 29th consecutive season in the Slovak First Football League. In addition to the domestic league, Ružomberok participated in the Slovak Cup.

After a poor first half of the campaign, Ružomberok and manager Ondřej Smetana mutually agreed to terminate his contract on 12 January 2026, six months after he had signed a new two-year deal with the club. The following day, the club appointed Jaroslav Köstl as manager, with the Czech arriving from the Czech Republic national team setup where he had worked under Ivan Hašek, while former Czech international Tomáš Hübschman was simultaneously named sporting director as part of the club's restructuring.

== Squad ==
Squad at end of season

Note: Flags indicate national team as defined under FIFA eligibility rules; some limited exceptions apply. Players may hold more than one non-FIFA nationality.

No.	Pos.	Nation	Player
1	GK	SVK	Attila Horváth
2	DF	SVK	Alexander Mojžiš
3	MF	SVK	Peter Doroš
4	MF	SVK	Oliver Luterán
5	DF	CZE	Tomáš Král (on loan from Mladá Boleslav)
6	MF	SVK	Timotej Múdry
7	DF	SVK	Adrián Slávik
8	MF	SVK	Ján Murgaš (on loan from Admira Wacker)
10	MF	SVK	Martin Chrien
11	MF	CZE	Vojtěch Novák
13	FW	SVK	David Jackuliak
14	FW	CZE	Jan Hladík
15	MF	SVK	Martin Bačík
16	DF	CZE	Daniel Köstl
17	MF	SVK	Adam Tučný
18	DF	SVK	Martin Šulek

No.	Pos.	Nation	Player
19	DF	SVK	Martin Gomola
20	FW	SVK	Marián Chobot
22	MF	CZE	Tomáš Buchvaldek
23	DF	SVK	Giuliano Antonio Marek
24	MF	SVK	Patrik Jevoš
25	MF	CZE	Samuel Grygar (on loan from Baník Ostrava)
26	FW	SVK	Marko Kelemen
28	DF	SVK	Alexander Selecký
30	DF	CZE	Dominik Mašek
31	MF	CZE	Lukáš Fila (on loan from Mladá Boleslav)
33	GK	SVK	Boris Halada
34	GK	SVK	Dávid Húska
35	GK	SVK	Branislav Sokol
36	DF	CZE	Lukáš Endl (on loan from Karviná)
38	FW	CZE	Ondřej Šašinka

== Transfers ==
=== Summer ===
In: Note: Flags indicate national team as defined under FIFA eligibility rules; some limited exceptions apply. Players may hold more than one non-FIFA nationality.

No.	Pos.	Nation	Player
—	DF	SVK	Adrián Slávik (from FK Železiarne Podbrezová)
—	MF	SVK	Vojtěch Novák (from (Czech Republic) Bohemians 1905)
18	DF	SVK	Martin Šulek (from FC Spartak Trnava)

Out: Note: Flags indicate national team as defined under FIFA eligibility rules; some limited exceptions apply. Players may hold more than one non-FIFA nationality.

No.	Pos.	Nation	Player
—	DF	SVK	Ján Maslo (Retired)
—	DF	SVK	Matej Madleňák (to FK Košice)
—	MF	SVK	Samuel Lavrinčík (to (Czech Republic) FK Jablonec)
—	FW	SVK	Štefan Gerec (to FK Dukla Banská Bystrica)

=== Winter ===
In: Note: Flags indicate national team as defined under FIFA eligibility rules; some limited exceptions apply. Players may hold more than one non-FIFA nationality.

No.	Pos.	Nation	Player
—	GK	SVK	Attila Horváth (from (Slovakia) FC ŠTK 1914 Šamorín)
—	MF	SVK	Ján Murgaš (on loan from (Austria) Admira Wacker)
—	DF	SVK	Giuliano Antonio Marek (loan return from (Slovakia) MFK Tatran Liptovský Mikuláš)

Out: Note: Flags indicate national team as defined under FIFA eligibility rules; some limited exceptions apply. Players may hold more than one non-FIFA nationality.

No.	Pos.	Nation	Player
—	GK	SVK	Dominik Ťapaj (to (Czech Republic) FC Viktoria Plzeň)
—	MF	SVK	Kristóf Domonkos (to (Slovakia) KFC Komárno)

== Competitions ==
=== Overview ===
Competition	First match	Last match	Starting round	Final position	Record							
Competition	First match	Last match	Starting round	Final position	Pld	W	D	L	GF	GA	GD	Win %
Slovak First Football League	27 July 2025	16 May 2026	Matchday 1	10th	32	8	11	13	34	50	−16	25.00
Slovak Cup	27 August 2025	10 December 2025	Second round	Round of 16	4	3	0	1	16	6	+10	75.00
Total					36	11	11	14	50	56	−6	30.56

Source: Competitions

=== Slovak First Football League ===
==== Regular season ====
===== League table =====
Pos	Team	Pld	W	D	L	GF	GA	GD	Pts	Qualification
4	Spartak Trnava	22	11	4	7	35	28	+7	37	Qualification for the championship group
5	Podbrezová	22	11	3	8	46	29	+17	36	Qualification for the championship group
6	Zemplín Michalovce	22	8	5	9	32	36	−4	29	Qualification for the championship group
7	Ružomberok	22	6	7	9	24	34	−10	25	Qualification for the relegation group
8	Trenčín	22	7	3	12	18	37	−19	24 (Note: Ranked by head-to-head points: Trenčín 6, Košice 0.)	Qualification for the relegation group
9	Košice	22	7	3	12	35	42	−7	24	Qualification for the relegation group
10	Komárno	22	5	7	10	24	34	−10	22	Qualification for the relegation group

Source: Niké liga (in Slovak)
Rules for classification: 1) Points; 2) Head-to-head points; 3) Head-to-head goal difference; 4) Head-to-head away goals scored; 5) Play-off.

===== Results summary =====
Overall								Home						Away					
Pld	W	D	L	GF	GA	GD	Pts	W	D	L	GF	GA	GD	W	D	L	GF	GA	GD
22	6	7	9	24	34	−10	25	2	5	4	10	13	−3	4	2	5	14	21	−7

Source: Niké liga

===== Results by round =====
Round	1	2	3	4	5	6	7	8	9	10	11	12	13	14	15	16	17	18	19	20	21	22
Ground	A	H	A	H	A	H	A	A	H	A	H	H	A	H	A	H	A	H	H	A	H	A
Result	L	L	L	L	L	D	W	W	W	W	L	D	D	L	L	D	W	D	W	L	D	D
Position	11	11	11	11	12	12	11	9	8	6	6	7	6	8	10	9	8	7	7	7	7	7
Points	0	0	0	0	0	1	4	7	10	13	13	14	15	15	15	16	19	20	23	23	24	25

Source: Worldfootball
A = Away; H = Home; W = Win; D = Draw; L = Loss

===== Matches =====
27 July 2025 1	Spartak Trnava	3–0	Ružomberok	Trnava
19:00 CEST (UTC+2)	Paur 43'; Azango 55'; Procházka 73'	Report		Stadium: Anton Malatinský Stadium; Attendance: 4,273; Referee: Filip Glova; Assistant referees: Peter Bednár, Matej Zemko

9 August 2025 3	DAC Dunajská Streda	2–0	Ružomberok	Dunajská Streda
20:30 CEST (UTC+2)	Ramadan 45+1' (pen.); Redzic 83'	Report	Mojžiš (red card) 32'; Domonkos (yellow card) 32'	Stadium: MOL Aréna; Attendance: 3,868; Referee: Marián Ruc; Assistant referees: Dušan Štofik, Martin Vitko

12 August 2025 2	Ružomberok	1–3	Skalica	Ružomberok
18:00 CEST (UTC+2)	Köstl (yellow card) 5', (goal) 79'; Šašinka (yellow card) 68'	Report	Podhorín (yellow card) 13'; Pudhorocký 57'; Šulek 65' (o.g.); Hollý 87'; Nagy (yellow card) 90'; Černek (yellow card) 90'	Stadium: Štadión pod Čebraťom; Attendance: 1,055; Referee: Ivan Kružliak; Assistant referees: Branislav Hancko, Ján Pozor

16 August 2025 4	Ružomberok	0–1	Zemplín Michalovce	Ružomberok
18:00 CEST (UTC+2)		Report	Bednár 42'; Cottrell (yellow card) 89'; Taylor-Hart (yellow card) 90'	Stadium: Štadión pod Čebraťom; Attendance: 868; Referee: Michal Očenáš; Assistant referees: Adam Jekkel, Tobiáš Pacák

23 August 2025 5	Košice	3–1	Ružomberok	Košice
18:00 CEST (UTC+2)	Čerepkai 13'; Krivák (yellow card) 28'; Zsigmund (yellow card) 40'; Kovács 56', 69'; Kakay (yellow card) 67'	Report	Šašinka 30' (pen.); Šulek (yellow card) 39'; Hladík (yellow card) 57'; Mojžiš (yellow card) 63'; Luterán (yellow card) 66'	Stadium: Košická futbalová aréna Attendance: 3,211; Referee: Filip Malárik; Assistant referees: Dušan Štofik, Peter Bednár

31 August 2025 6	Ružomberok	3–3	Žilina	Ružomberok
17:00 CEST (UTC+2)	Hladík 8'; Šašinka 26'; Selecký 33'; Šulek (yellow card) 60'; Bačík (yellow card) 83'	Report	Kopásek (yellow card) 28'; Ďatko 45'; Faško 55' (pen.); Roginić (yellow card) 86'; Kóša 90'	Stadium: Štadión pod Čebraťom; Attendance: 1,567; Referee: Peter Kráľovič; Assistant referees: Ákos Juhos, Dávid Bobko

13 September 2025 7	Trenčín	0–3	Ružomberok	Trenčín
18:00 CEST (UTC+2)	Yakubu (yellow card) 38'; Bagín (yellow card) 52'; Pavek (yellow card) 56'; Hájovský (yellow card) 64'; Khan (yellow card) 89'	Report	Köstl 58', (yellow card) 89'; Selecký (yellow card) 78'; Mojžiš (yellow card) 79'; Bagín 86' (o.g.); Král 90'; Bačík (yellow card) 90'	Stadium: Štadión Sihoť; Attendance: 1,713; Referee: Michal Očenáš; Assistant referees: Tomáš Straka, Juraj Halíček

20 September 2025 8	Tatran Prešov	1–3	Ružomberok	Prešov
18:00 CEST (UTC+2)	Regáli (yellow card) 53', (goal) 79'; Šimko (red card) 58'	Report	Bačík 1'; Král 11'; Köstl (yellow card) 29'; Hladík (yellow card) 58', (goal) 61'	Stadium: Futbal Tatran Arena; Attendance: 6,369; Referee: Erik Gemzický; Assistant referees: František Ferenc, Rastislav Kuba

28 September 2025 9	Ružomberok	1–0	Podbrezová	Ružomberok
17:00 CEST (UTC+2)	Fila (yellow card) 58'; Grygar (yellow card) 60'; Gomola (yellow card) 76'; Tučný 88'	Report	Luka (yellow card) 61'; Sanusi (yellow card) 72'	Stadium: Štadión pod Čebraťom; Attendance: 1,141; Referee: Martin Dohál; Assistant referees: Pavel Jánošík, Matej Hrebeňár

18 October 2025 11	Ružomberok	0–1	Komárno	Ružomberok
15:30 CEST (UTC+2)	Král (yellow card) 77'; Grygar (yellow card) 84'	Report	Tamás 53'; Ganbayar (yellow card) 62'; Rudzan (yellow card) 85'; Ožvolda (yellow card) 87'	Stadium: Štadión pod Čebraťom; Attendance: 737; Referee: Peter Ziemba; Assistant referees: Patrik Kmec, Matej Hrebeňár

26 October 2025 12	Ružomberok	1–1	Spartak Trnava	Ružomberok
15:30 CET (UTC+1)	Selecký 17'; Mojžiš (yellow card) 46' (yellow-red card) 61'	Report	Ťapaj 24' (o.g.); Nwadike (yellow card) 29'; Twardzik (yellow card) 37'; Azango (yellow card) 51' (yellow-red card) 59'	Stadium: Štadión pod Čebraťom; Attendance: 1,434; Referee: Michal Očenáš; Assistant referees: Ján Pozor, Ákos Juhos

1 November 2025 13	Skalica	0–0	Ružomberok	Skalica
15:30 CET (UTC+1)		Report		Stadium: Mestský štadión Skalica; Attendance: 473; Referee: Boris Benedik; Assistant referees: Tobiáš Pacák, Matej Hrebeňár

8 November 2025 14	Ružomberok	0–1	DAC Dunajská Streda	Ružomberok
15:30 CET (UTC+1)	Selecký (yellow card) 21' (yellow-red card) 44'; Bačík (yellow card) 56'	Report	Redzic 3'; Udvaros (yellow card) 20'; Kapanadze (yellow card) 34'; Alex Méndez (yellow card) 52'	Stadium: Štadión pod Čebraťom; Attendance: 1,155; Referee: Lukáš Dzivjak; Assistant referees: Patrik Kmec, Dávid Bobko

23 November 2025 15	Zemplín Michalovce	4–2	Ružomberok	Michalovce
15:30 CET (UTC+1)	Ramos 16'; Paulauskas (yellow card) 45', (goal) 46'; Ahl 57'; Taylor-Hart 88'	Report	Endl 29'; Fila (yellow card) 51'; Ramos 76' (o.g.)	Stadium: Mestský futbalový štadión Attendance: 735; Referee: Filip Glova; Assistant referees: Daniel Poláček, Peter Bednár

29 November 2025 16	Ružomberok	1–1	Košice	Ružomberok
15:30 CET (UTC+1)	Chrien 25'; Luterán (yellow card) 64'; Köstl (yellow card) 90+3'	Report	Čerepkai 2'; Ďurko (yellow card) 50'	Stadium: Štadión pod Čebraťom; Attendance: 676; Referee: Peter Ziemba; Assistant referees: Mário Roszbeck, Juraj Halíček

3 December 2025 10	Slovan Bratislava	1–2	Ružomberok	Bratislava
18:00 CET (UTC+1)	Ihnatenko 34', (yellow card) 90'; Bajrić (yellow card) 61'; Tolić (yellow card) 90'	Report	Hladík 4', (yellow card) 31'; Ťapaj (yellow card) 57'; Múdry (yellow card) 70'; Luterán (yellow card) 73'; Fila 80'	Stadium: Tehelné pole Attendance: 3,119; Referee: Filip Glova; Assistant referees: Daniel Poláček, Ákos Juhos

6 December 2025 17	Žilina	1–2	Ružomberok	Žilina
15:30 CET (UTC+1)	Kopásek 39'; Roginić (yellow card) 58'; Káčer (yellow card) 65'; Kóša (yellow card) 90+7'	Report	Tučný 5'; Endl (yellow card) 44' (yellow-red card) 90+7'; Luterán (yellow card) 58'; Fila (yellow card) 63'; Hladík 72'; Húska (yellow card) 84'	Stadium: Štadión pod Dubňom; Attendance: 1,536; Referee: Matej Choreň; Assistant referees: Dušan Štofik, Martin Vitko

13 December 2025 18	Ružomberok	0–0	Trenčín	Ružomberok
15:30 CET (UTC+1)	Köstl (yellow card) 33'	Report	Yakubu (yellow card) 75'; Sabljić (yellow card) 90'	Stadium: Štadión pod Čebraťom; Attendance: 543; Referee: Bálint Kišš; Assistant referees: Tomáš Straka, Ákos Juhos

7 February 2026 19	Ružomberok	1–0	Tatran Prešov	Ružomberok
15:30 CET (UTC+1)	Fila 8'; Bačík (yellow card) 26'; Marek (yellow card) 82'; Selecký (yellow card) 90'	Report	Begala (yellow card) 64'; Ukhan (yellow card) 77'; Sipľak (yellow card) 87'; Tatolna (yellow card) 89'	Stadium: Štadión pod Čebraťom; Attendance: 1,158; Referee: Marián Ruc; Assistant referees: Mário Roszbeck, Ákos Juhos

14 February 2026 20	Podbrezová	5–0	Ružomberok	Podbrezová
15:30 CET (UTC+1)	Lampreht 36'; Kováčik 45', (yellow card) 51'; Šiler 47', 77'; Palumets (yellow card) 60'; Chyla 73'	Report		Stadium: ZELPO Aréna; Attendance: 611; Referee: Martin Dohál; Assistant referees: Martin Vitko, Juraj Halíček

22 February 2026 21	Ružomberok	2–2	Slovan Bratislava	Ružomberok
15:30 CET (UTC+1)	Fila 9'; Selecký (yellow card) 30'; Marković 82' (o.g.)	Report	Marković 48'; Pokorný (red card) 54'; Barseghyan 68'; Marcelli (yellow card) 80'	Stadium: Štadión pod Čebraťom; Attendance: 1,513; Referee: Erik Gemzický; Assistant referees: Peter Bednár, Ákos Juhos

28 February 2026 22	Komárno	1–1	Ružomberok	Zlaté Moravce
15:30 CET (UTC+1)	Jones (yellow card) 70'; Rudzan (yellow card) 82'; Mashike 88'	Report	Selecký 50', (yellow card) 68'	Stadium: ViOn Aréna; Attendance: 283; Referee: Filip Glova; Assistant referees: Adam Jekkel, František Ferenc

==== Relegation group ====
===== League table =====
Pos	Team	Pld	W	D	L	GF	GA	GD	Pts	Qualification or relegation	KOŠ	TRE	SKA	RUŽ	KOM	TAT
7	Košice	32	13	4	15	51	55	−4	43		—	2–0	2–0	3–1	2–1	2–1
8	Trenčín	32	13	3	16	34	51	−17	42		3–0	—	2–1	3–1	1–2	1–0
9	Skalica	32	9	8	15	34	45	−11	35		3–1	4–1	—	1–0	2–1	1–0
10	Ružomberok	32	8	11	13	34	50	−16	35		1–1	4–3	0–0	—	2–1	1–1
11	Komárno (O)	32	8	8	16	34	46	−12	32	Qualification for the relegation play-offs	1–2	0–1	0–2	3–0	—	1–0
12	Tatran Prešov (R)	32	6	12	14	29	43	−14	30	Relegation to the 2. Liga	2–1	0–1	3–0	0–0	0–0	—

Source: Niké liga (in Slovak)
Rules for classification: 1) Points; 2) Points in regular season; 3) Head-to-head points in regular season; 4) Head-to-head goal difference in regular season; 5) Head-to-head goals scored in regular season; 6) Head-to-head away goals scored in regular season (if two teams tied); 7) Goal difference; 8) Goals scored; 9) Fair play ranking; 10) Drawing of lots.
(O) Play-off winners; (R) Relegated

===== Results summary =====
Overall								Home						Away					
Pld	W	D	L	GF	GA	GD	Pts	W	D	L	GF	GA	GD	W	D	L	GF	GA	GD
10	2	4	4	10	16	−6	10	2	3	0	8	6	+2	0	1	4	2	10	−8

Source: Worldfootball

===== Results by round =====
Round	23	24	25	26	27	28	29	30	31	32
Ground	A	H	A	A	H	H	A	H	H	A
Result	L	D	L	D	D	W	L	D	W	L
Position	9	10	10	9	9	9	9	10	9	10
Points	25	26	26	27	28	31	31	32	35	35

Source: Worldfootball
A = Away; H = Home; W = Win; D = Draw; L = Loss

===== Matches =====
8 March 2026 23	Komárno	3–0	Ružomberok	Zlaté Moravce
15:30 CET (UTC+1)	Druga 3'; Mustafić (yellow card) 64'; Jones 76', (yellow card) 81'; Mashike 90+3'	Report	Múdry (yellow card) 90+1'	Stadium: ViOn Aréna; Attendance: 293; Referee: Martin Dohál; Assistant referees: Tobiáš Pacák, Patrik Kmec

14 March 2026 24	Ružomberok	1–1	Košice	Ružomberok
15:30 CET (UTC+1)	Tučný 2'; Hladík (yellow card) 47'	Report	Lichý 48', (yellow card) 90'; Kružliak (yellow card) 82'	Stadium: Štadión pod Čebraťom; Attendance: 1,288; Referee: Michal Smolák; Assistant referees: Mário Roszbeck, Juraj Halíček

21 March 2026 25	Trenčín	3–1	Ružomberok	Trenčín
15:30 CET (UTC+1)	Hájovský 45'; David 62' (pen.), 74'	Report	Fila 22' (pen.); Grygar (yellow card) 33'; Luterán (yellow card) 36'; Tučný (yellow card) 50'	Stadium: Štadión Sihoť; Attendance: 861; Referee: Matej Choreň; Assistant referees: Mário Roszbeck, Dávid Bobko

4 April 2026 26	Tatran Prešov	0–0	Ružomberok	Prešov
15:30 CEST (UTC+2)	Barbosa (yellow card) 48'; Bondarenko (yellow card) 65'; Taraduda (yellow card) 89'; Menich (yellow card) 90+3'	Report	Mojžiš (yellow card) 80'; Jevoš (yellow card) 82'; Kelemen (yellow card) 89'	Stadium: Futbal Tatran Arena; Attendance: 3,487; Referee: Bálint Kišš; Assistant referees: Daniel Poláček, Tomáš Vorel

11 April 2026 27	Ružomberok	0–0	Skalica	Ružomberok
15:30 CEST (UTC+2)		Report	Nagy (yellow card) 54'	Stadium: Štadión pod Čebraťom; Attendance: 778; Referee: Peter Kráľovič; Assistant referees: Tomáš Straka, Mário Roszbeck

18 April 2026 28	Ružomberok	2–1	Komárno	Ružomberok
15:30 CEST (UTC+2)	Chrien 47'; Kelemen 83' (pen.), (yellow card) 83' (yellow-red card) 88'; Hladík (yellow card) 90'	Report	Žák 22', (yellow card) 58'; Ožvolda (yellow card) 36'; Krčík (yellow card) 90'	Stadium: Štadión pod Čebraťom; Attendance: 858; Referee: Filip Glova; Assistant referees: Patrik Kmec, Simeon Vass

25 April 2026 29	Košice	3–1	Ružomberok	Košice
18:00 CEST (UTC+2)	Sovič 10'; Kovács 13'; Lichý 28'	Report	Selecký 68' (pen.)	Stadium: Košická futbalová aréna Attendance: 2,518; Referee: Peter Ziemba; Assistant referees: Dávid Bobko, Rastislav Kuba

2 May 2026 30	Ružomberok	1–1	Tatran Prešov	Ružomberok
18:00 CEST (UTC+2)	Král 29'; Selecký (yellow card) 84'; Hladík (yellow card) 87'	Report	Begala (yellow card) 53'; Medveděv 63', (yellow card) 90+3'; Tatolna (red card) 84'	Stadium: Štadión pod Čebraťom; Attendance: 1,551; Referee: Bálint Kišš; Assistant referees: Mário Roszbeck, Martin Vitko

9 May 2026 31	Ružomberok	4–3	Trenčín	Ružomberok
18:00 CEST (UTC+2)	Hladík 14'; Jevoš 34'; Murgaš 45' (pen.); Tučný 90+4'	Report	David 5', 24', 37' (pen.); Diouf (yellow card) 28'; Baždarić (yellow card) 85'	Stadium: Štadión pod Čebraťom; Attendance: 1,448; Referee: Lukáš Dzivjak; Assistant referees: Branislav Hancko, Tomáš Straka

16 May 2026 32	Skalica	1–0	Ružomberok	Skalica
17:00 CEST (UTC+2)	Šimko 76'	Report	Jevoš (yellow card) 73'; Murgaš (yellow card) 77'; Luterán (yellow card) 85'	Stadium: Mestský štadión Skalica; Attendance: 1,130; Referee: Michal Smolák; Assistant referees: František Ferenc, Tobiáš Pacák

=== Slovak Cup ===
27 August 2025 Second round	Oravan Oravská Jasenica	2–6	Ružomberok	Oravská Jasenica
17:00 CEST (UTC+2)	Holubčík 24', 82'; Hollý (yellow card) 27'; Hojo (yellow card) 63'; Hurák (yellow card) 69'	Report	Hladík 9', 30'; Jackuliak 39'; Hvoľka 43' (o.g.); Marek 45'; Kelemen 73'	Attendance: 295; Referee: Igor Valent; Assistant referees: Tomáš Vorel, Dávid Krško

24 September 2025 Third round	Kežmarok	0–7	Ružomberok	Kežmarok
15:30 CEST (UTC+2)	Kristan (yellow card) 13'; Henrique (yellow card) 35'; Grega (yellow card) 82'	Report	Buchvaldek (penalty missed) 4'; Kelemen 28', 33'; Tučný 31', 76', 84'; Slávik 39'; Luterán 50'; Endl (yellow card) 71'	Stadium: Futbalový štadión Kežmarok; Attendance: 486; Referee: Kristián Micheľ; Assistant referees: Jozef Maliňák, Juraj Gallik

22 October 2025 Fourth round	Zvolen	0–1	Ružomberok	Zvolen
14:45 CEST (UTC+2)	Dvorský (red card) 45+1'	Report	Tučný (yellow card) 45+1'; Luterán (yellow card) 45+1'; Chrien (yellow card) 60'; Húska (yellow card) 80'	Stadium: Futbal Aréna Zvolen; Attendance: 905; Referee: Erik Gemzický; Assistant referees: Adam Jekkel, Peter Čajka

10 December 2025 Round of 16	Ružomberok	2–4	Košice	Ružomberok
15:00 CET (UTC+1)	Hladík 76', 90'	Report	Sovič 3'; Rehuš 33', 58'; Teplan (yellow card) 55'; Magda 79'	Stadium: Štadión pod Čebraťom; Attendance: 551; Referee: Michal Smolák; Assistant referees: Daniel Poláček, Peter Bednár; Fourth official: Marián Ruc
