= 2024–25 MFK Ružomberok season =

MFK Ružomberok
2024–25 season
- Manager: Ondřej Smetana
- Stadium: Štadión pod Čebraťom
- Slovak First Football League: 5th
- Slovak Cup: Pre-season
- UEFA Europa League: Second qualifying round
- Top goalscorer: League: All: Matúš Malý (2)

The 2024–25 season is the 119th season in the history of MFK Ružomberok, and the club's 22nd consecutive season in Slovak First Football League. In addition to the domestic league, the team is scheduled to participate in the Slovak Cup and the UEFA Europa League.

== Squad ==
Note: Flags indicate national team as defined under FIFA eligibility rules; some limited exceptions apply. Players may hold more than one non-FIFA nationality.

No.	Pos.	Nation	Player
1	GK	SVK	Dominik Ťapaj
2	DF	SVK	Alexander Mojžiš
3	DF	SVK	Ján Maslo
4	MF	SVK	Oliver Luterán
5	MF	SVK	Rudolf Božík
6	MF	SVK	Timotej Múdry
7	MF	CZE	Filip Souček (on loan from Sparta Prague)
8	MF	SVK	Kristóf Domonkos
9	FW	CZE	David Huf
11	MF	SVK	Samuel Lavrinčík
14	FW	CZE	Jan Hladík
15	FW	SVK	Štefan Gerec
16	DF	CZE	Daniel Köstl
17	MF	SVK	Adam Tučný

No.	Pos.	Nation	Player
18	FW	SVK	Martin Boďa
19	MF	SVK	Martin Gomola
20	FW	SVK	Marián Chobot
23	DF	SVK	Matej Madleňák
24	MF	SVK	Máté Szolgai (on loan from Dunajská Streda)
25	DF	SVK	Andrej Kadlec (on loan from Mladá Boleslav)
28	DF	SVK	Alexander Selecký
30	MF	SVK	Martin Chrien
32	DF	SVK	Matúš Malý
34	GK	SVK	Dávid Húska
35	GK	SVK	Branislav Sokol
—	GK	CZE	Hugo Jan Bačkovský (on loan from Slovan Liberec)

== Friendlies ==
=== Pre-season ===
14 June 2024 Friendly	Ružomberok (Slovakia)	4–0	(Slovakia) FK Humenné

19 June 2024 Friendly	Ružomberok (Slovakia)	2–2	(Albania) KF Egnatia

22 June 2024 Friendly	NK Domžale (Slovenia)	2–2	(Slovakia) Ružomberok

25 June 2024 Friendly	Ružomberok (Slovakia)	1–1	(Romania) Rapid București	Slovenia
11:00 UTC+2

29 June 2024 Friendly	Liptovský Mikuláš (Slovakia)	3–1	(Slovakia) Ružomberok

3 July 2024 Friendly	Ružomberok (Slovakia)	2–2	(Czech Republic) FC Zlín
17:00

== Competitions ==
=== Overall record ===
Competition	First match	Last match	Starting round	Record							
Competition	First match	Last match	Starting round	Pld	W	D	L	GF	GA	GD	Win %
Slovak First Football League	28 July 2024		Matchday 1	1	0	1	0	1	1	+0	0.00
Slovak Cup	28 August 2024			0	0	0	0	0	0	+0	—
UEFA Europa League	25 July 2024		First qualifying round	3	1	0	2	5	5	+0	33.33
Total				4	1	1	2	6	6	+0	25.00

Last updated: 28 July 2024
Source: Soccerway

=== Slovak First Football League ===
==== League table ====
Pos	Team	Pld	W	D	L	GF	GA	GD	Pts	Qualification
6	Košice	22	7	8	7	31	25	+6	29	Qualification for the championship group
7	Zemplín Michalovce	22	6	9	7	28	34	−6	27	Qualification for the relegation group
8	Komárno	22	6	4	12	24	38	−14	22	Qualification for the relegation group
9	Ružomberok	22	5	5	12	22	39	−17	20 (Note: Ranked on head-to-head points: Ružomberok (4); Trenčín (1).)	Qualification for the relegation group
10	Trenčín	22	3	11	8	22	35	−13	20	Qualification for the relegation group
11	Skalica	22	4	7	11	21	35	−14	19	Qualification for the relegation group
12	Dukla Banská Bystrica	22	4	5	13	22	38	−16	17	Qualification for the relegation group

Source: Niké liga (in Slovak)
Rules for classification: 1) Points; 2) Head-to-head points; 3) Head-to-head goal difference; 4) Head-to-head away goals scored; 5) Play-off.
Notes:

Pos	Team	Pld	W	D	L	GF	GA	GD	Pts	Qualification	SLO	ŽIL	TRN	DAC	KOŠ	POD
1	Slovan Bratislava (C, Q)	32	22	6	4	74	39	+35	72	Qualification for the Champions League second qualifying round (Note: Since already qualified Paris Saint-Germain won the Champions League, Slovan Bratislava was promoted to the Champions League second qualifying round as one of the two champions with the highest coefficient in Champions League qualifying.)	—	4–3	1–1	2–2	1–0	3–1
2	Žilina (Q)	32	15	9	8	55	40	+15	54	Qualification for the Conference League second qualifying round	0–5	—	2–1	0–1	0–0	0–0
3	Spartak Trnava (Q)	32	14	10	8	46	34	+12	52	Qualification for the Europa League first qualifying round	2–3	2–4	—	1–1	0–1	2–1
4	DAC Dunajská Streda (O)	32	13	12	7	48	34	+14	51	Qualification for the Conference League play-offs	2–1	3–1	1–0	—	3–2	1–1
5	Košice	32	11	11	10	45	38	+7	44	Qualification for the Conference League play-offs	2–3	3–2	2–1	2–2	—	1–1
6	Železiarne Podbrezová	32	8	13	11	40	43	−3	37	Qualification for the Conference League play-offs	1–3	1–1	1–2	2–0	0–1	—

Source: Niké liga (in Slovak)
Legend: Blue = home team win; Yellow = draw; Red = away team win.
Rules for classification: 1) Points; 2) Head-to-head points; 3) Head-to-head goal difference; 4) Head-to-head away goals scored; 5) Play-off.
(C) Champions; (O) Play-off winners; (Q) Qualified for the phase indicated
Notes:

Pos	Team	Pld	W	D	L	GF	GA	GD	Pts	Qualification or relegation	ZMI	KOM	SKA	RUŽ	TRE	DUK
1	Zemplín Michalovce	32	10	10	12	48	56	−8	40	Qualification for the Conference League play-offs	—	4–5	2–4	2–1	3–2	3–3
2	Komárno	32	11	6	15	36	48	−12	39		0–1	—	1–1	1–2	0–0	2–1
3	Skalica	32	10	8	14	36	45	−9	38		1–0	0–1	—	1–0	1–0	3–1
4	Ružomberok	32	10	6	16	35	50	−15	36		1–0	0–1	3–2	—	1–0	1–2
5	Trenčín (O)	32	7	14	11	37	48	−11	35	Qualification for the relegation play-offs	3–2	1–0	2–0	2–2	—	2–2
6	Dukla Banská Bystrica (R)	32	5	7	20	35	60	−25	22	Relegation to the 2. Liga	2–3	0–1	0–2	0–2	2–3	—

Source: Niké liga (in Slovak)
Legend: Blue = home team win; Yellow = draw; Red = away team win.
Rules for classification: 1) Points; 2) Head-to-head points; 3) Head-to-head goal difference; 4) Head-to-head away goals scored; 5) Play-off.
(O) Play-off winners; (R) Relegated

==== Results summary ====
Overall								Home						Away					
Pld	W	D	L	GF	GA	GD	Pts	W	D	L	GF	GA	GD	W	D	L	GF	GA	GD
1	0	1	0	1	1	0	1	0	1	0	1	1	0	0	0	0	0	0	0

Last updated: 28 July 2024.

==== Results by round ====
Round	1	2	3
Ground	H	A	H
Result	D	P	
Position	5		

Updated to match(es) played on 28 July 2024. Source:
A = Away; H = Home; W = Win; D = Draw; L = Loss

==== Matches ====
28 July 2024 1	Ružomberok	1–1	Dukla Banská Bystrica	Ružomberok
18:00 UTC+2	Boďa 18'		Rymarenko 67'	Stadium: Štadión pod Čebraťom; Referee: Igor Valent

11 August 2024 3	Ružomberok	1–0	Trenčín	Ružomberok
18:00 UTC+2	Múdry 5' (pen.); Martin Gomola (yellow card) 54'; Luterán (yellow card) 58'	Report	Rahim Ibrahim (yellow card) 22'; Stolica (yellow card) 42'; Gajdoš (yellow card) 42'	Stadium: Štadión pod Čebraťom; Attendance: 1,072; Referee: (Slovakia) Peter Ziemba

25 August 2024 5	Ružomberok	2–2	Zemplín Michalovce	Ružomberok
18:00 UTC+2	Chrien 81'; Martin Boďa 90+1' (pen.)	Report	Taraduda (yellow card) 14'; Adekunle 41' 49'; Shimamura (yellow card) 83'; Lukáč (yellow card) 84'	Stadium: Štadión pod Čebraťom; Attendance: 978; Referee: (Slovakia) Matej Choreň

1 September 2024 6	Spartak Trnava	2–2	Ružomberok	Trnava
18:00 CEST	Kratochvíl 9'; Mikovič 22'; Ďuriš (yellow card) 61'	Report	Smetana (yellow card) 14'; Hladík 44' (yellow card) 71'; Chrien 62' (pen.); Domonkos (yellow card) 83'	Stadium: Anton Malatinský Stadium; Attendance: 3,666; Referee: (Slovakia) Erik Gemzický

15 September 2024 7	Ružomberok	1–0	Podbrezová	Ružomberok
18:00 CEST	Hladík 37'; Selecký (red card) 60'; Luterán (yellow card) 85'; Gabriel (yellow card) 90+1'	Report	Faško (yellow card) 33'; Ďatko (yellow card) 74'; Oravec (yellow card) 77'; Koštrna (yellow card) 85' (yellow-red card) 90+3'	Stadium: Štadión pod Čebraťom; Attendance: 1,024; Referee: (Slovakia) Ivan Kružliak

21 September 2024 8	Slovan Bratislava	2–1	Ružomberok	Bratislava
20:30 CEST	Mak 11'; Bajrić (yellow card) 42'; Gabriel 63' (o.g.); Barseghyan (yellow card) 90+5'	Report	Chrien 43'; Domonkos (yellow card) 89'; Hladík (yellow card) 89'	Stadium: Tehelné pole Attendance: 6,077; Referee: (Slovakia) Filip Glova

24 September 2024 4	Komárno	1–2	Ružomberok	Zlaté Moravce
18:00 CEST	Malý 3'; Pillár (yellow card) 40'; Dominik Žák (yellow card) 52'; Šmehýl (yellow card) 90+1'	Report	Huf 56' (yellow card) 90+4'; Lavrinčík 79' (pen.); Tučný (yellow card) 90+5'	Stadium: ViOn Aréna; Attendance: 460; Referee: (Slovakia) Michal Očenáš

29 September 2024 9	Ružomberok	1–2	Skalica	Ružomberok
18:00 CEST	Gabriel (yellow card) 24'; Hladík 45+1'; Köstl (yellow card) 53'; Malý (yellow card) 56'	Report	Leginus (yellow card) 2'; Podhorín 75' (pen.); Selecký 90+1' (o.g.); Junas (yellow card) 90+4'	Stadium: Štadión pod Čebraťom; Attendance: 1,120; Referee: (Slovakia) Michal Smolak

5 October 2024 10	Košice	2–1	Ružomberok	Košice
18:00 CET	Faško 12'; Bokros 31'; Niarchos (yellow card) 54'; Skuhravý (yellow card) 54'	Report	Köstl (yellow card) 25'; Malý (red card) 39'; Gabriel 45+3'; Chrien (yellow card) 90+1'; Smetana (red card) 90+2'; Selecký (yellow card) 90+3'	Stadium: Košická futbalová aréna Attendance: 2,887; Referee: (Slovakia) Matej Choreň

=== Slovak Cup ===
18 September 2024 Second Round	Diviaky	0-9	Ružomberok
16:00		Report	Madleňák 14' 53'; Martin Boďa 47' 66'; Huf 56'; Tučný 76' 90'; Domonkos 83'; Daniel Prekop 87'

9 October 2024 Third Round	Podkonice	2-3	Ružomberok	Podkonice
15:00	Ivan Očenáš 40'; Peter Maslo 45'	Report	Luterán 25'; Huf 54'; Hladík 84'	Stadium: Štadión na Brodku; Referee: (Slovakia) Anton Ihring

23 October 2024 Fourth Round	Kostolné Kračany	0-3	Ružomberok
14:00		Report	Martin Boďa 14' 42'; Tučný 90'	Referee: (Slovakia) Igor Valent

=== UEFA Europa League ===
==== First qualifying round ====
The draw was held on 18 June 2024.

11 July 2024 First leg	Ružomberok (Slovakia)	5–2	(Kazakhstan) Tobol	Ružomberok
19:00 UTC+2	Gabriel 11', (yellow card) 56'; Selecký 40', (yellow card) 66'; Malý 45+2', 88'; Madleňák 77'; Luterán (yellow card) 90+2'	Report	Ivanović 8'; Chesnokov (yellow card) 33'; Henen 45'; Gabarayev (yellow card) 47'; Shakhov (yellow card) 63'; Ndiaye (yellow card) 86'; Miladinović (yellow card) 90'	Stadium: Štadión pod Čebraťom; Referee: Kyriakos Athanasiou (Cyprus)

18 July 2024 Second leg	Tobol (Kazakhstan)	1–0 (3–5 agg.)	(Slovakia) Ružomberok	Kostanay, Kazakhstan
20:00 UTC+5	El Messaoudi 8'			Stadium: Kostanay Central Stadium; Referee: Mikkel Redder (Denmark)

==== Second qualifying round ====
25 July 2024 First leg	Ružomberok (Slovakia)	0–2	(Turkey) Trabzonspor	Ružomberok
18:30 UTC+2	Gomola (yellow card) 51'	Report	Trézéguet 39'; Elmalı (yellow card) 86'; Çanak 90+1'	Stadium: Štadión pod Čebraťom; Referee: Bastian Dankert (Germany)

1 August 2024 Second leg	Trabzonspor (Turkey)	v (2–0 agg.)	(Slovakia) Ružomberok	Trabzon, Turkey
20:30 UTC+3				Stadium: Şenol Güneş Sports Complex
