= 2024 Slovak Cup final =

2024 Slovak Cup Final
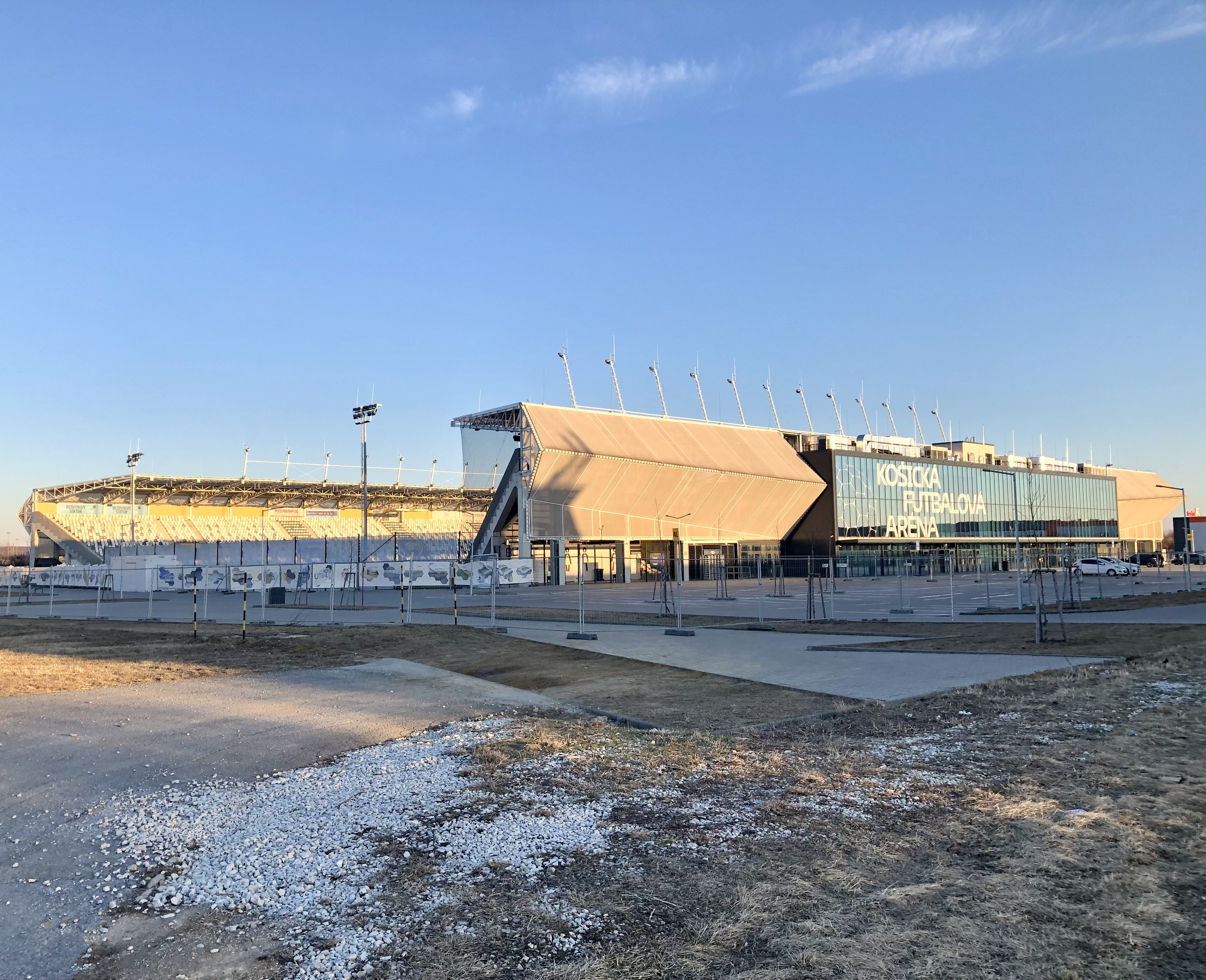
- Košická futbalová aréna in Košice held the final
- Event: 2023–24 Slovak Cup
Ružomberok	Spartak Trnava
1	0
- Date: 1 May 2024
- Venue: Košická futbalová aréna, Košice
- Referee: Ivan Kružliak
- Attendance: 8,764

The 2024 Slovak Cup final (known as the Slovnaft Cup for sponsorship reasons) was the final match of the 2023–24 Slovak Cup, the 55th season of the top cup competition in Slovak football. The match was played on 1 May 2024, contested by MFK Ružomberok and FC Spartak Trnava.

== Teams ==
In the following table, finals until 1993 were in the Czechoslovak era, since 1994 were in the Slovak era.

Team	Previous final appearances (bold indicates winners)
Ružomberok	4 (2001, **2006**, 2018, 2020)
Spartak Trnava	15 (**1971**, 1972, 1974, **1975**, **1980**, 1988, **1991**, 1996, **1998**, 2006, 2008, 2010, **2019**, **2022**, **2023**)

== Road to the final ==
Note: In all results below, the score of the finalist is given first (H: home; A: away; N: neutral venue).

Ružomberok (1)		Round	Spartak Trnava (1)
Opponent	Result	2023–24 Slovak Cup	Opponent	Result
Bye		Preliminary round	Bye
Bye		First round	Bye
Dynamo Diviaky (4)	4–0 (A)	Second round	Šurany (5)	8–0 (A)
Sokol Zubrohlava (4)	3–0 (A)	Third round	Lehota pod Vtáčnikom (3)	7–0 (A)
Tatran Liptovský Mikuláš (2)	1–1 (4–3 p) (H)	Fourth round	Považská Bystrica (2)	2–1 (A)
Pohronie (2)	2–0 (H)	Round of 16	FC Košice (1)	3–2 (A)
DAC Dunajská Streda (1)	1–0 (A)	Quarter-finals	Zemplín Michalovce (1)	2–0 (A)
Odeva Lipany (3)	5–0 (A), 0–1 (H) (5–1 agg.)	Semi-finals	Železiarne Podbrezová (1)	1–0 (H), 0–0 (A) (1–0 agg.)

== Match ==
=== Details ===
1 May 2024
15:00 (UTC+2)

Ružomberok	1–0	Spartak Trnava
Tučný 45+2'	Report

Košická futbalová aréna, Košice
Attendance: 8,764
Referee: Ivan Kružliak

GK	34	(Slovakia) Tomáš Frühwald
RB	22	(Czech Republic) Šimon Gabriel
CB	32	(Slovakia) Matúš Malý
LB	2	(Slovakia) Alexander Mojžiš		(substituted off) 66'
RM	4	(Slovakia) Oliver Luterán		(substituted off) 79'
CM	11	(Slovakia) Samuel Lavrinčík
CM	24	(Slovakia) Marek Zsigmund (c)	(yellow card) 32'	(substituted off) 75'
LM	28	(Slovakia) Alexander Selecký
RW	14	(Czech Republic) Jan Hladík	(yellow card) 90+7' (yellow-red card) 90+8'	(substituted off) 75'
CF	30	(Slovakia) Martin Chrien
LW	17	(Slovakia) Adam Tučný		(substituted off) 66'
Substitutes:
GK	1	(Slovakia) Dominik Ťapaj
DF	3	(Slovakia) Ján Maslo		(substituted in) 66'
MF	6	(Slovakia) Timotej Múdry		(substituted in) 75'
MF	8	(Slovakia) Kristóf Domonkos		(substituted in) 66'
MF	10	(Slovakia) Samuel Šefčík
FW	13	(Slovakia) David Jackuliak		(substituted in) 79'
FW	15	(Slovakia) Štefan Gerec		(substituted in) 75'
FW	18	(Slovakia) Martin Boďa
DF	39	(Slovakia) Juraj Kotula
Manager:
(Czech Republic) Ondřej Smetana

GK	71	(Slovakia) Dominik Takáč
RB	18	(Slovakia) Martin Šulek		(substituted off) 60'
CB	24	(Slovakia) Kristián Koštrna	(yellow card) 41'
CB	26	(Slovakia) Sebastian Kóša
LB	29	(Slovakia) Martin Mikovič (c)	(yellow card) 90+7'
DM	80	(Slovenia) Adrian Zeljković		(substituted off) 75'
RM	23	(Slovakia) Erik Daniel
CM	97	(Ghana) Kelvin Ofori
CM	6	(Slovakia) Roman Procházka		(substituted off) 75'
LM	11	(Nigeria) Philip Azango
CF	57	(Slovakia) Michal Ďuriš	(yellow card) 90+6'
Substitutes:
GK	31	(Slovakia) Dobrivoj Rusov
DF	2	(Slovakia) Lukáš Štetina
MF	8	(Slovakia) Samuel Štefánik
DF	13	(Slovakia) Marek Ujlaky
MF	17	(Slovakia) Jakub Paur	(yellow card) 76'	(substituted in) 60'
MF	25	(Serbia) Filip Bainović
MF	28	(Slovakia) Martin Bukata	(substituted in) 75'	(substituted off) 90'
DF	77	(Nigeria) Kazeem Bolaji
FW	88	(Czech Republic) Tomáš Poznar		(substituted in) 90'
Manager:
(Slovakia) Michal Gašparík

Assistant referees:
František Ferenc
Martin Vitko
Fourth official:
Michal Smolák
Video assistant referee:
Michal Očenáš
Assistant video assistant referee:
Filip Glova

**Match rules**

- 90 minutes.
- 30 minutes of extra time if necessary.
- Penalty shoot-out if scores still level.

== See also ==
- 2023–24 Slovak Cup
- 2024–25 UEFA Europa Conference League
