= Samuel Grygar =

Czech footballer (born 2004)

Personal information
- Date of birth: 9 August 2004 (age 22)
- Place of birth: Czech Republic
- Height: 1.85 m (6 ft 1 in)
- Position: Midfielder

Team information
- Current team: Mladá Boleslav (on loan from Baník Ostrava)
- Number: 14

Youth career
- 2011–2014: Vítkovice
- 2014–2020: Baník Ostrava
- 2020–2023: Inter Milan

Senior career*
Years	Team	Apps	(Gls)
2023–	Baník Ostrava	16	(0)
2024	Baník Ostrava B	1	(0)
2025–2026	→ Ružomberok (loan)	25	(0)
2026–	→ Mladá Boleslav (loan)	1	(0)
2026–	→ Mladá Boleslav B (loan)	2	(0)

International career^{‡}
2018–2019	Czech Republic U15	10	(0)
2019–2020	Czech Republic U16	6	(0)
2021–2022	Czech Republic U18	13	(3)
2022–2023	Czech Republic U19	3	(0)
2023–2024	Czech Republic U20	5	(0)
- * Club domestic league appearances and goals as of 07:26, 14 October 2026 (UTC) ‡ National team caps and goals as of 07:26, 14 October 2026 (UTC)

Samuel Grygar (born 9 August 2004) is a Czech professional footballer who currently plays as a midfielder for Mladá Boleslav on loan from Baník Ostrava.

== Club career ==
Grygar started his career in the MFK Vítkovice youth academy, playing there for 3 years.

=== Inter Milan youth ===
In September 2020, he transferred from Baník Ostrava to the Italian club Inter Milan, where he began playing for the youth team there.

Grygar won the Primavera, the Italian junior league, with Inter in 2022. He occasionally trained with the A-team, but did not play in a match.

=== Baník Ostrava ===
Grygar became a Baník player again in the summer of 2023. After three seasons at the Italian Inter, he signed a four-year contract with the club. He made his league debut on 17 March 2024 in a 1–0 win against Pardubice, when he replaced Jiří Boula as a substitute in the 90th minute.

=== Loan to MFK Ružomberok ===
On 15 July 2025, it was announced that Grygar would be joining Slovak First League club MFK Ružomberok on a loan. He started his loan in the worst possible way, during a pre-season training session with Romanian side Voluntari, Grygar was fouled hard by an opponent, injuring ligaments in his ankle.

Grygar made his debut for Ružomberok on 16 August 2025, coming on as a substitute in the 65th minute for Timotej Múdry. He was not able to make an impact in a 1–0 loss against Zemplín Michalovce. Grygar would receive his first start for Ružomberok in a 3–1 loss against FC Košice, playing 71st minutes. He featured in a historic 2–1 away win against ŠK Slovan Bratislava. Grygar's first goal contribution would come in a 2–1 win against MŠK Žilina, assisting a goal scored by Adam Tučný.

=== Loan to Mladá Boleslav ===
On 19 August 2026, Grygar joined Mladá Boleslav on a one-year loan deal with an option to make the transfer permanent.
