= Luteran =

Luteran may refer to:

- Luterán, a list of people with the surname
- Lutéran, a trade name of the medication chlormadinone acetate

== See also ==
- Lutheranism
