= 2023–24 Slovak Cup =

Slovnaft Cup

Tournament details
- Country: Slovakia
- Dates: 19 July 2023 – 1 May 2024
- Teams: 281

Final positions
- Champions: Ružomberok
- Runners-up: Spartak Trnava

The 2023–24 Slovak Cup was the 55th season of the annual Slovak football cup competition. It was sponsored by Slovnaft and known as the Slovnaft Cup for sponsorship purposes. The winners qualified for the 2024–25 UEFA Europa League first qualifying round. Slovak First Football League team Spartak Trnava were the defending champions, having defeated rivals Slovan Bratislava in the previous season's final for their second consecutive title and eighth title overall.

Ružomberok won the cup on 1 May 2024, defeating Spartak Trnava 1–0 in the final.

== Format ==
The Slovak Cup is played as a knockout tournament. All matches that end up as a draw after 90 minutes are decided by penalty shoot-outs. All rounds are played as one-off matches except the semi-finals, which are played over two legs.

== Teams ==
Round	Main date	New entries this round	Previous round winners	Number of fixtures	Clubs remaining
Preliminary round	22 July 2023	102	0	51	281
First round	2 August 2023	153	51	102	230
Second round	23 August 2023	26	102	64	128
Third round	27 September 2023	0	64	32	64
Fourth round	25 October 2023	0	32	16	32
Round of 16	8 November 2023	0	16	8	16
Quarter-finals	28 February 2024	0	8	4	8
Semi-finals	2/3 and 16/17 April 2024	0	4	4	4
Final	1 May 2024	0	2	1	2

== Preliminary round ==
Team 1	Score	Team 2
19 July 2023
TJ Malinovo	0–8	OFK Dunajská Lužná
ŠK Šenkvice	2–2 (3–4 p)	ŠK Tomášov
20 July 2023
FK Iskra Nováky	1–1 (5–6 p)	FK Junior Kanianka
22 July 2023
MŠK Kráľová pri Senci	5–4	SFC Kalinkovo
Spartak Vysoká nad Kysucou	1–2	Tatran Krásno nad Kysucou
TJ Slovan Skalité	0–6	MŠK Kysucké Nové Mesto
FK Lovinobaňa	1–3	TJ Jednota Málinec
TJ Družstevník Látky	2–1	TJ Sklotatran Poltár
TJ Lovča	0–2	FK Sitno Banská Štiavnica
TJ Horný Hričov	4–0	FK Čadca
TJ Sokol Liesek	0–0 (5–6 p)	ŠK Tvrdošín
1. FK Buzitka	0–3	OŠK Radzovce
OFK Hliník nad Hronom	0–0 (2–3 p)	FK FILJO Ladomerská Vieska
TJ Považan Pruské	2–2 (0–3 p)	TJ Partizán Domaniža
FC Slovan Častá	2–0	FC Slovan Modr
ŠK Igram	2–1	FK Karpaty Limbach
OFK Vysoká pri Morave	0–4	ŠK Lozorno
FKM Stupava	0–0 (1–4 p)	TJ Jarovce Bratislava
23 July 2023
ŠK Nitra-Dolné Krškany	0–4	1. FC Černík
FK Veľký Cetín	5–3	TJ Slovan Nitra-Chrenov
TJ Družstevník Siladice	5–0	ŠK Veľké Zálužie
TJ Spartak Lysá pod Makytou	3–0	TJ Priehrada Udiča
FC Semerovo	2–1	TJ Veľké Lovce
Družstevník Opatová nad Váhom	7–0	Futbal - FK Melčice - Lieskové
TJ Horné Saliby	3–1	TJ Družstevník Topoľníky
FK Slovan Nemšová	0–4	OŠK Trenčianske Stankovce
MFK Stará Turá	3–1	TJ Spartak Horná Streda
TJ Kopčany	2–1	OFK Mokrý Háj
TJ Tatran Uhrovec	1–0	TJ Slovan Zemianske Kostoľany
ŠK Sokol Borský Mikuláš	1–2	TJ Slovan Šaštín-Stráže
TJ Slovan Dubovce	1–0	TJ Iskra Holíč
TJ Družstevník Odorín	4–0	TJ Štart Hrabušice
FK Široké	2–2 (5–6 p)	OTJ Jamník
FK Kamenica	2–5	TJ Sokol Brezovička
TJ Busov Gaboltov	6–4	TJ Družstevník Čirč
ŠK Kuzmice	2–5	OFK Vojčice
OFK Sečovská Polianka	2–4	TJ Jasenov
OŠK Zalužice	1–1 (3–4 p)	ŠK Nacina Ves
TJ Mokrance	1–3	FK Bidovce
OFK Slovan Poproč	2–2 (4–5 p)	TJ Maratón Seňa
TJ Spišský Štiavnik	6–3	FK Veľká Lomnica
OFK Vikartovce	4–1	OŠK Spišský Štvrtok
FK Považská Sokoľ	4–1	FK Kysak
OŠK Pribiš	2–1	ŠK Olympia Bobrov
26 July 2023
MFK Záhorská Bystrica	0–10	TJ Rovinka
MFK Strojár Krupina	1–2	ŠK Prameň Kováčová
28 July 2023
TJ Nenince	2–4	MFK Baník Veľký Krtíš
29 July 2023
ŠK Svätý Jur	2–1	NŠK 1922 Bratislava
TJ Vinohrad Čebovce	1–1 (6–7 p)	FK Slovenské Ďarmoty
30 July 2023
FC 34 Liptovský Mikuláš - Palúdzka	1–3	OŠK Švošov
TJ Fatran Varín	1–2	ŠK Belá

== First round ==
Team 1	Score	Team 2
26 July 2023
Sokol Chminianska Nová Ves	3–4	MFK Slovan Sabinov
Slavoj Spišská Belá	0–0 (3–4 p)	1. MFK Kežmarok
FK Olcnava	0–1	OŠK Rudňany
ŠK Harichovce	0–1	FK Poprad
FC Lokomotíva Košice	7–3	FK Čaňa
II.Rákóczi Ferenc Borša	7–0	TJ Mladosť Kalša
MFK Gelnica	3–1	FK Kechnec
Družstevník Malá Ida	6–1	OŠK Pavlovce nad Uhom
FK Krásnohorské Podhradie	0–5	MFK Spartak Medzev
29 July 2023
TJ Pokrok Stará Bystrica	0–4	TJ Višňové
FK Veľký Cetín	1–4	FK Slovan Duslo Šaľa
Lokomotíva Devínska Nová Ves	2–1	SDM Domino
FK Danubia Veľký Biel	3–3 (4–5 p)	ŠK Bernolákovo
TJ Družstevník Hlboké	2–2 (1–4 p)	MFK Vrbové
OŠK Podolie	1–3	FK Bestrent Horná Krupá
TJ Lokomotíva Bánov	0–1	ŠK Bešeňov
TJ Družstevník Jacovce	1–4	FC Baník Prievidza
TJ Tatran Čierny Balog	3–3 (5–4 p)	ŠK Partizán Čierny Balog
OFK Ludanice	1–0	FC Topoľčany
30 July 2023
FK Inter Bratislava	1–1 (4–5 p)	FC Slovan Galanta
TJ Družstevník Odorín	1–5	MFK Vranov nad Topľou
FK Dulova Ves	0–1	FK Geča 73
TJ Slovan Dubovce	3–0	Nové Mesto nad Váhom
OŠK Pribiš	2–7	ŠK Odeva Lipany
TJ Jasenov	0–2	MFK Snina
TJ Sokol Brezovička	0–6	MŠK Tesla Stropkov
TJ Maratón Seňa	1–2	Slávia TU Košice
OTJ Jamník	1–0	1. FK Svidník
OFK Perín	0–0 (4–5 p)	MFK Rožňava
ŠK Nová Dedinka	3–1	ŠK Vrakuňa Bratislava
TJ Slovan Vištuk	2–1	PŠC Pezinok
OŠK Láb	0–6	MFK Rusovce
FK Košeca	1–3	PFK Piešťany
TJ Tatran Jablonica	2–1	ŠK Blava 1928
TJ Spartak Kvašov	2–4	TJ Slovan Brvnište
TJ Baník Brodskék	1–8	TJ Spartak Šaštín-Stráže
FC Družstevník Rybky	0–7	TJ Slavoj Boleráz
ŠK Báb	5–1	ŠK Šoporňa
ŠK Svodín	0–2	MŠO Štúrovo
TJ Kostolné Kračany	0–2	ŠK 1923 Gabčíkovo
TJ Salka	2–1	MŠK Želiezovce
ŠK Kmeťovo	w/o	FC Nitra
ŠK Tvrdošovce	0–1	FKM Nové Zámky
ŠK Nevidzany	2–2 (4–5 p)	ŠK Sokol Starý Tekov
ŠK Šurany	2–0	OFK Branč
TJ Slovan Zbehy	3–2	FC Pata
FC Komjatice	0–8	TJ Družstevník Trstice
OFK Solčany	0–2	OFK Tovarníky
FK Bidovce	1–2	FK Považská Sokoľ
TJ Spišský Štiavnik	7–1	OFK Vikartovce
ŠK Nacina Ves	2–0	OFK Vojčice
FC Slovan Častá	3–2	ŠK Igram
31 July 2023
TJ Busov Gaboltov	1–9	Partizán Bardejov
2 August 2023
TJ Družstevník Siladice	3–3 (5–4 p)	FK Dubnica
TJ Kopčany	1–3	FK Beluša
TJ Slovan Šaštín-Stráže	0–5	OK Častkovce
TJ Horné Saliby	0–0 (4–3 p)	TJ Družstevník Veľké Ludince
FK Podkonice	6–0	ŠK Prameň Kováčová
OŠK Trenčianske Stankovce	3–0	TJ Jednota Bánová
ŠK Nitra-Dolné Krškany	1–4	Baník Lehota pod Vtáčnikom
ŠK Lozorno	0–2	FC Žolík Malacky
OŠK Švošov	0–3	TJ Tatran Oravské Veselé
TJ Družstevník Látky	1–4	MŠK Rimavská Sobota
Tatran Krásno nad Kysucou	1–2	MŠK Námestovo
FK FILJO Ladomerská Vieska	0–5	FTC Fiľakovo
FC Semerovo	2–7	TJ Baník Kalinovo
ŠK Tvrdošín	1–5	Stará Ľubovňa Redfox FC
ŠK Závod	0–3	FC Rohožník
TJ Družstevník Blatnica	1–1 (3–5 p)	TJ Družstevník Bitarová
TJ Slovan Dudince	0–2	TJ Slovan Tomášovce
FK Nižná	0–4	TJ Sokol Zubrohlava
TJ Partizán Osrblie	5–0	MFK Detva
OŠK Likavka	0–1	OŠK Bešeňová
FK Predmier	0–1	ŠK Javorník Makov
MŠK Tisovec	0–3	FK Iskra Hnúšťa
MFK Baník Veľký Krtíš	1–2	MŠK Novohrad Lučenec
TJ Tatran Uhrovec	4–3	Sokol FC Chocholná-Velčice
Spartak Lysá pod Makytou	1–4	TJ Partizán Domaniža
ŠK Svätý Jur	3–0	TJ Jarovce Bratislava
FK Sitno Banská Štiavnica	3–0	FK Slovenské Ďarmoty
MFK Stará Turá	2–0	Družstevník Opatová nad Váhom
FK Brezno	0–4	RSC Hamsik Academy
MŠK Kráľová pri Senci	0–6	FK Rača
FK Junior Kanianka	3–2	MFK Zvolen
ŠK Tomášov	1–1 (4–3 p)	TJ Rovinka
4 August 2023
OFK 1950 Priechod	0–0 (1–3 p)	TJ Sokol Medzibrod
5 August 2023
Oravan Oravská Jasenica	4–1	FK Tatran Turzovka
FK Strečno	2–4	OŠK Renop Liptovská Teplá
FK Selce	1–5	ŠK Badín
FK Attack Vrútky	2–4	FK Šalková
6 August 2023
TJ Horný Hričov	0–3	MŠK Kysucké Nové Mesto
TJ Slovan Magura Vavrečka	0–2	ŠK Dynamo Diviaky
TJ Jednota Málinec	5–1	OŠK Radzovce
TJ Prameň Dolná Strehová	1–2	TJD Príbelce
8 August 2023
TJ Slovan Bystrička	0–4	OŠK Rosina
9 August 2023
OFK Dunajská Lužná	0–9	ŠKF Sereď
11 August 2023
TJ Tatran Chlebnice	2–4	TJ Spartak Radôstka
16 August 2023
ŠK Belá	0–6	MŠK Fomat Martin
OŠK Fintice	0–4	MŠK Spišské Podhradie
FK 09 Bacúch	1–0	MFK Revúca
FK Jesenské	1–1 (4–3 p)	OFK Slovenská Ľupča
ŠK Vinica	3–0	OFK Olováry

== Second round ==
Team 1	Score	Team 2
16 August 2023
TJ Horné Saliby	1–1 (3–2 p)	MŠO Štúrovo
22 August 2023
TJ Slovan Tomášovce	1–5	KFC Komárno
TJ Slavoj Boleráz	3–1	MŠK Púchov
TJD Príbelce	1–5	RSC Hamsik Academy
23 August 2023
MFK Spartak Medzev	1–3	1. FC Tatran Prešov
TJ Tatran Jablonica	0–10	Spartak Myjava
MFK Rusovce	1–4	FC ŠTK 1914 Šamorín
TJ Družstevník Bitarová	0–4	MŠK Považská Bystrica
II.Rákóczi Ferenc Borša	0–6	FK Slavoj Trebišov
FC Slovan Častá	0–9	FC Petržalka
TJ Spartak Radôstka	0–1	MFK Dolný Kubín
FK Poprad	2–2 (6–5 p)	FK Humenné
MFK Gelnica	0–1	FK Spišská Nová Ves
OŠK Renop Liptovská Teplá	1–2	MŠK Žilina
TJ Tatran Čierny Balog	0–12	FK Železiarne Podbrezová
ŠK 1923 Gabčíkovo	1–5	FC DAC 1904 Dunajská Streda
TJ Družstevník Trstice	1–1 (3–4 p)	MFK Skalica
TJ Partizán Osrblie	2–4	MFK Dukla Banská Bystrica
MFK Vrbové	0–3	AS Trenčín
ŠK Dynamo Diviaky	0–4	MFK Ružomberok
MFK Slovan Sabinov	0–2	MŠK Spišské Podhradie
OŠK Rudňany	1–1 (4–5 p)	MŠK Tesla Stropkov
FC Lokomotíva Košice	1–1 (5–3 p)	Slávia TU Košice
TJ Družstevník Malá Ida	1–2	MFK Vranov nad Topľou
TJ Višňové	1–0	OŠK Rosina
ŠK Bešeňov	1–1 (4–2 p)	FK Slovan Duslo Šaľa
Lokomotíva Devínska Nová Ves	0–0 (5–3 p)	FC Žolík Malacky
ŠK Bernolákovo	1–7	FK Rača
FK Bestrent Horná Krupá	0–1	FK Beluša
TJ Tatran Uhrovec	1–5	FC Baník Prievidza
ŠK Kmeťovo	1–4	FKM Nové Zámky
ŠK Nová Dedinka	0–0 (3–4 p)	FC Slovan Galanta
TJ Slovan Dubovce	1–1 (2–4 p)	PFK Piešťany
FK Iskra Hnúšťa	1–2	ŠK Odeva Lipany
FK Považská Sokoľ	1–8	MFK Snina
TJ Spišský Štiavnik	2–2 (3–2 p)	OTJ Jamník
TJ Slovan Vištuk	1–2	FC Rohožník
TJ Spartak Šaštín-Stráže	0–6	OK Častkovce
TJ Salka	1–3	TJ Baník Kalinovo
ŠK Sokol Starý Tekov	2–3	Baník Lehota pod Vtáčnikom
TJ Družstevník Siladice	2–2 (5–3 p)	TJ Slovan Zbehy
ŠK Nacina Ves	0–1	Partizán Bardejov
ŠK Badín	0–2	FK Podkonice
MFK Stará Turá	0–3	OŠK Trenčianske Stankovce
Oravan Oravská Jasenica	0–5	TJ Tatran Oravské Veselé
TJ Jednota Málinec	1–6	MŠK Rimavská Sobota
TJ Sokol Zubrohlava	1–1 (8–7 p)	MŠK Námestovo
FK Sitno Banská Štiavnica	0–0 (6–5 p)	FTC Fiľakovo
ŠK Tomášov	1–3	ŠKF Sereď
MŠK Kysucké Nové Mesto	0–1	ŠK Javorník Makov
FK 09 Bacúch	1–3	TJ Sokol Medzibrod
FK Šalková	0–2	MŠK Fomat Martin
29 August 2023
FK Geča 73	0–6	MFK Tatran Liptovský Mikuláš
1. MFK Kežmarok	0–3	FC Košice
MFK Rožňava	0–1	MFK Zemplín Michalovce
TJ Slovan Brvnište	3–0	TJ Partizán Domaniža
OFK Tovarníky	5–0	FK Junior Kanianka
FK Jesenské	0–3	MŠK Novohrad Lučenec
30 August 2023
OŠK Bešeňová	2–3	Stará Ľubovňa Redfox FC
6 September 2023
ŠK Vinica	1–4	FK Pohronie
OFK Ludanice	0–11	FC ViOn Zlaté Moravce
13 September 2023
ŠK Báb	0–0 (4–5 p)	OFK Malženice
ŠK Svätý Jur	0–7	ŠK Slovan Bratislava
ŠK Šurany	0–8	FC Spartak Trnava

== Third round ==
Team 1	Score	Team 2
6 September 2023
TJ Sokol Zubrohlava	0–3	MFK Ružomberok
20 September 2023
TJ Slovan Brvnište	0–0 (4–3 p)	OŠK Trenčianske Stankovce
TJ Sokol Medzibrod	2–2 (3–2 p)	MŠK Rimavská Sobota
26 September 2023
FK Podkonice	0–3	MFK Dukla Banská Bystrica
TJ Družstevník Siladice	0–4	MFK Skalica
27 September 2023
FC Slovan Galanta	3–3 (4–2 p)	FC Petržalka
Lokomotíva Devínska Nová Ves	2–0	FC Rohožník
FK Rača	0–3	FC ŠTK 1914 Šamorín
OK Častkovce	1–2	AS Trenčín
TJ Slavoj Boleráz	0–1	FK Beluša
ŠK Bešeňov	1–6	OFK Malženice
TJ Horné Saliby	1–4	FC DAC 1904 Dunajská Streda
FKM Nové Zámky	4–2	TJ Baník Kalinovo
OFK Tovarníky	0–3	FC ViOn Zlaté Moravce
RSC Hamsik Academy	1–4	FK Železiarne Podbrezová
FK Sitno Banská Štiavnica	1–5	KFC Komárno
MŠK Novohrad Lučenec	0–1	FK Pohronie
ŠK Javorník Makov	2–0	Stará Ľubovňa Redfox FC
TJ Višňové	0–5	MŠK Fomat Martin
MŠK Spišské Podhradie	2–4	MFK Tatran Liptovský Mikuláš
FK Poprad	5–2	MŠK Tesla Stropkov
MFK Snina	1–0	1. FC Tatran Prešov
FC Lokomotíva Košice	1–2	FK Slavoj Trebišov
Partizán Bardejov	1–4	FK Spišská Nová Ves
MFK Vranov nad Topľou	1–2	MFK Zemplín Michalovce
3 October 2023
TJ Tatran Oravské Veselé	0-3	MŠK Žilina
ŠK Odeva Lipany	0–3	MFK Dolný Kubín
4 October 2023
FC Baník Prievidza	1–6	MŠK Považská Bystrica
10 October 2023
PFK Piešťany	0–4	Spartak Myjava
11 October 2023
TJ Spišský Štiavnik	0–6	FC Košice
Baník Lehota pod Vtáčnikom	1–2	FC Spartak Trnava
18 October 2023
ŠKF Sereď	1–3	ŠK Slovan Bratislava

== Fourth round ==
Team 1	Score	Team 2
24 October 2023
FK Slavoj Trebišov	0–9	FK Železiarne Podbrezová
FK Pohronie	1–0	MFK Dukla Banská Bystrica
25 October 2023
FC ŠTK 1914 Šamorín	0–2	FC Košice
OFK Malženice	1–2	FC ViOn Zlaté Moravce
Lokomotíva Devínska Nová Ves	1–1 (6–5 p)	AS Trenčín
TJ Slovan Brvnište	0–0 (2–4 p)	FK Spišská Nová Ves
MŠK Fomat Martin	0–2	KFC Komárno
ŠK Javorník Makov	0–3	ŠK Odeva Lipany
MFK Snina	1–6	FC DAC 1904 Dunajská Streda
MFK Ružomberok	1–1 (4–3 p)	Tatran Liptovský Mikuláš
FK Poprad	1–2	Spartak Myjava
FKM Nové Zámky	1–4	MFK Zemplín Michalovce
TJ Sokol Medzibrod	0–8	MŠK Žilina
FK Beluša	1–2	MFK Skalica
1 November 2023
MŠK Považská Bystrica	1–2	FC Spartak Trnava
18 November 2023
FC Slovan Galanta	0–3	ŠK Slovan Bratislava

== Round of 16 ==
Team 1	Score	Team 2
7 November 2023
FK Spišská Nová Ves	0–3	FC DAC 1904 Dunajská Streda
8 November 2023
MFK Skalica	2–0	KFC Komárno
ŠK Odeva Lipany	1–1 (4–3 p)	Spartak Myjava
Lokomotíva Devínska Nová Ves	0–3	MFK Zemplín Michalovce
17 November 2023
FC ViOn Zlaté Moravce	1–3	FK Železiarne Podbrezová
29 November 2023
MFK Ružomberok	2–0	FK Pohronie
3 February 2024
FC Košice	2–3	FC Spartak Trnava
28 February 2024
ŠK Slovan Bratislava	1–0	MŠK Žilina

== Quarter-finals ==
=== Summary ===
Team 1	Score	Team 2
28 February 2024
ŠK Odeva Lipany	0–0 (5–3 p)	MFK Skalica
FC DAC 1904 Dunajská Streda	0–1	MFK Ružomberok
6 March 2024
MFK Zemplín Michalovce	0–2	FC Spartak Trnava
13 March 2024
ŠK Slovan Bratislava	1–3	FK Železiarne Podbrezová

=== Matches ===
28 February 2024
14:00 CET (UTC+1)

Odeva Lipany	0–0	Skalica
	Report
Penalties
Vitovič (penalty scored); Shlyakhov (penalty scored); Jacko (penalty scored); Kovalcik (penalty scored); Dlugoš (penalty scored)	5–3	(penalty scored) Podhorín; (penalty missed) Ranko; (penalty scored) Smékal; (penalty scored) Nagy

Štadión ŠK Odeva, Lipany
Attendance: 1,320
Referee: Matej Choreň

28 February 2024
17:30 CET (UTC+1)

DAC Dunajská Streda	0–1	Ružomberok
	Report	Chrien 73'

MOL Aréna, Dunajská Streda
Attendance: 6,342
Referee: Martin Dohál

6 March 2024
17:30 CET (UTC+1)

Zemplín Michalovce	0–2	Spartak Trnava
	Report	Azango 37'; Ďuriš 71'

Mestský futbalový štadión, Michalovce
Attendance: 1,028
Referee: Marián Ruc

13 March 2024
20:30 CET (UTC+1)

Slovan Bratislava	1–3	Železiarne Podbrezová
Barseghyan 33'	Report	Faško 36'; Chyla 84'; Paraj 86'

Tehelné pole, Bratislava
Attendance: 1,620
Referee: Martin Dohál

== Semi-finals ==
The draw for the semi-finals was held on 14 March 2024.

=== Summary ===
Team 1	Agg.	Team 2	1st leg	2nd leg
ŠK Odeva Lipany	1–5	MFK Ružomberok	0–5	1–0
FC Spartak Trnava	1–0	FK Železiarne Podbrezová	1–0	0–0

=== Matches ===
2 April 2024
16:00 CEST (UTC+2)

Odeva Lipany	0–5	Ružomberok
	Report	Hladík 15'; Gerec 25', 27', 45', 56'

Štadión ŠK Odeva, Lipany
Attendance: 2,135
Referee: Martin Dohál
16 April 2024
15:30 CEST (UTC+2)

Ružomberok	0–1	Odeva Lipany
	Report	Vitovič 70'

Štadión pod Čebraťom, Ružomberok
Attendance: 731
Referee: Marián Ruc

Ružomberok won 5–1 on aggregate.

3 April 2024
15:30 CEST (UTC+2)

Spartak Trnava	1–0	Železiarne Podbrezová
Procházka 4'	Report

Anton Malatinský Stadium, Trnava
Attendance: 3,738
Referee: Ivan Kružliak
17 April 2024
18:00 CEST (UTC+2)

Železiarne Podbrezová	0–0	Spartak Trnava
	Report

ZELPO Aréna, Podbrezová
Attendance: 3,650
Referee: Peter Ziemba

Spartak Trnava won 1–0 on aggregate.

== Final ==
1 May 2024
15:00 (UTC+2)

Ružomberok	1–0	Spartak Trnava
Tučný 45+2'	Report

Košická futbalová aréna, Košice
Attendance: 8,764
Referee: Ivan Kružliak

== See also ==
- 2023–24 Slovak First Football League
- 2024–25 UEFA Europa League
