= Roland Števko =

Slovak footballer

Personal information
- Full name: Roland Števko
- Date of birth: 8 April 1983 (age 43)
- Place of birth: Levice, Czechoslovakia
- Height: 1.88 m (6 ft 2 in)
- Position: Striker

Youth career
- Slovan Levice

Senior career*
Years	Team	Apps	(Gls)
2001–2006	MFK Ružomberok	92	(39)
2006–2007	Greuther Fürth	2	(0)
2007–2008	MFK Ružomberok	25	(20)
2008–2009	MFK Ružomberok B	23	(5)
2009–2010	FK Senica	21	(1)
2010	→ Tatran Prešov (loan)	3	(0)
Total		166	(65)

International career
2005	Slovakia U-21	9	(1)
- * Club domestic league appearances and goals

Roland Števko (born 8 April 1983 in Levice) is a Slovak former professional footballer who played as a striker.
