= Luterán =

Luterán is a surname. Notable people with the surname include:

- Oliver Luterán (born 2001), Slovak footballer
- Petra Luterán (born 1997), Hungarian para-athlete
