= Tomáš Frühwald =

Slovak football goalkeeper

Personal information
- Date of birth: 23 September 2002 (age 24)
- Place of birth: Banská Bystrica, Slovakia
- Height: 1.93 m (6 ft 4 in)
- Position: Goalkeeper

Team information
- Current team: Bohemians 1905
- Number: 23

Youth career
- 2012–2017: Dukla Banská Bystrica
- 2017–2018: Železiarne Podbrezová
- 2018–2019: Nitra
- 2019–2021: Ružomberok

Senior career*
Years	Team	Apps	(Gls)
2021–2024	Ružomberok	34	(0)
2024–	Bohemians 1905	21	(0)
- * Club domestic league appearances and goals as of 27 May 2025

Tomáš Frühwald (born 23 September 2002) is a Slovak professional footballer who plays for Bohemians 1905 as a goalkeeper.

== Club career ==
=== MFK Ružomberok ===
Frühwald made his Fortuna Liga debut for Ružomberok against ŠKF Sereď at Štadión pod Čebraťom on 21 May 2022, he conceded one goal in the match from the penalty.

=== Bohemians 1905 ===
On 5 September 2024, MFK Ružomberok announced departure of Frühwald to Czech side Bohemians 1905, where he signed contract.
