= David Huf =

Czech footballer

Personal information
- Date of birth: 23 January 1999 (age 27)
- Place of birth: Czech Republic
- Height: 1.87 m (6 ft 2 in)
- Position: Centre-forward

Team information
- Current team: Viktoria Žižkov
- Number: 28

Youth career
- 2005–2008: TJ SK Jevíčko
- 2008–2010: SKP Slovan Moravská Třebová
- 2010–2013: TJ Svitavy
- 2013–2016: Pardubice

Senior career*
Years	Team	Apps	(Gls)
2016–2024	Pardubice	94	(13)
2022	→ Dukla Prague (loan)	10	(0)
2023	→ Chrudim (loan)	16	(12)
2024	→ Bohemians 1905	9	(2)
2024–2025	Ružomberok	21	(3)
2025–2026	Chrudim	36	(13)
2026–	Viktoria Žižkov	0	(0)

International career
2016	Czech Republic U16	2	(0)
- * Club domestic league appearances and goals as of 25 June 2025

David Huf (born 23 January 1999) is a Czech professional footballer who plays for Viktoria Žižkov in Czech National Football League as a centre-forward.

== Club career ==
On 5 September 2024 Huf joined Ružomberok, signing a two-year contract.

On 5 September 2025, Huf signed a contract with Czech National Football League club Chrudim.

On 8 September 2026, Huf signed a contract with Czech National Football League club Viktoria Žižkov.
