= Kristóf Domonkos =

Slovak footballer

Personal information
- Full name: Kristóf Domonkos
- Date of birth: 17 August 1998 (age 28)
- Place of birth: Galanta, Slovakia
- Height: 1.77 m (5 ft 10 in)
- Position: Midfielder

Team information
- Current team: KFC Komárno
- Number: 10

Youth career
- –2017: DAC Dunajská Streda
- 2013–2015: → Slovan Bratislava (loan)

Senior career*
Years	Team	Apps	(Gls)
2017−2019	DAC Dunajská Streda	0	(0)
2018−2019	→ Komárno (loan)	41	(6)
2019	ETO Győr	1	(0)
2019	→ Komárno (loan)	10	(2)
2020–2021	Komárno	44	(9)
2022−2025	Ružomberok	76	(7)
2026–	KFC Komárno	14	(1)
- * Club domestic league appearances and goals as of 22 September 2026

Kristóf Domonkos (born 17 August 1998) is a Slovak footballer who currently plays for KFC Komárno as a midfielder.

== Club career ==
=== Early career ===
Domonkos played in the youth academy DAC 1904 Dunajská Streda. He also played for the under-16 and under-17 categories at Slovan Bratislava.

=== MFK Ružomberok ===
Domonkos made his Fortuna Liga debut for Ružomberok against Žilina on 14 February 2022. Ružomberok won the home fixture 5–1. Domonkos was replaced after some 67 minutes by Martin Boďa, who would score 3 minutes later. Domonkos would feature in the 2024 Slovak Cup final, coming on for Adam Tučný in the 67th minute and helping his club keep ahold of a 1–0 lead and winning the trophy. Domonkos would also appear in the final the next season, this time losing to Spartak Trnava 1–0.

=== KFC Komárno ===
On 9 January 2026, it was announced that Domonkos would be returning to KFC Komárno for the 3rd time.
