= Martin Bačík (footballer, born 2007) =

Slovak footballer

Personal information
- Date of birth: 7 March 2007 (age 19)
- Place of birth: Bytča, Slovakia
- Position: Midfielder

Team information
- Current team: MFK Ružomberok
- Number: 15

Youth career
- –2021: MŠK Žilina
- 2021–2024: MFK Ružomberok

Senior career*
Years	Team	Apps	(Gls)
2025–	MFK Ružomberok	36	(2)

International career^{‡}
2023	Slovakia U16	3	(0)
2023	Slovakia U17	6	(1)
2024	Slovakia U18	8	(1)
2025–	Slovakia U19	5	(0)
- * Club domestic league appearances and goals as of 22 September 2026 ‡ National team caps and goals as of 4 January 2026

Martin Bačík (born 7 March 2007) is a Slovak professional footballer who plays as a midfielder for Slovak First Football League club MFK Ružomberok. He also represents the Slovakia under-19 national team.

Bačík has represented Slovakia at multiple youth levels.

== Club career ==
Bačík was a part of the MŠK Žilina youth academy before being released in 2021.

=== MFK Ružomberok ===
On 23 July 2025, Bačík signed his first professional contract with Ružomberok, signing a 3-year contract. He made his debut on 27 August 2025, in a 3–0 loss against FC Spartak Trnava, playing the final 15 minutes of the game after coming on as a substitute for Kristóf Domonkos. Bačík scored his first goal for the club in a 3–1 win over league newcomers Tatran Presov, scoring in the first 22 seconds of the game.

== International career ==
In 2024, Bačík was selected by the head coach of the Slovakia national under-17 football team, Branislav Fodrek, to be a part of the squad ahead of the 2024 UEFA European Under-17 Championship in Cyprus. In the first game against Sweden, he featured only on the bench in a 0–0 draw. Bačík played in the final game of the group stage, a 4–0 defeat against Poland U17, which finished Slovakia on last place with only one point.

He debuted for the Slovakia U19 team in a 3–1 loss against Finland U19.

== Personal life ==
Bačík is a native of Bytča, a town a part of the Žilina Region.
