= Viliam Hýravý =

Slovak footballer

Personal information
- Date of birth: 26 November 1962 (age 63)
- Place of birth: Ružomberok, Czechoslovakia
- Height: 1.79 m (5 ft 10 in)
- Position: Striker

Senior career*
Years	Team	Apps	(Gls)
1983–1984	BZ Ružomberok		
1984–1988	ZVL Žilina	115	(24)
1988–1991	Baník Ostrava	75	(25)
1991–1992	Toulouse FC	28	(3)
1992–1995	Baník Ostrava	65	(11)
1995	Dukla Banska Bystrica	14	(6)
1995–1996	MŠK Žilina		
1996–2002	MFK Ružomberok	121	(26)
Total		418	(95)

International career
1987–1990	Czechoslovakia	11	(0)
1990	Czechoslovakia B	1	(0)
1987–1988	Czechoslovakia Olympic	9	(1)
1994–1995	Slovakia	5	(0)
- * Club domestic league appearances and goals

Viliam Hýravý (born 26 November 1962) is a Slovak former football player. He played as a midfielder or striker. He represented Czechoslovakia, and later Slovakia, internationally. He played his club football in the top-level leagues of Czechoslovakia, France, the Czech Republic and Slovakia.

At club level Hýravý played for BZ Ružomberok, ZVL Zilina, Dukla Banska Bystrica, and Czech club Baník Ostrava. He played for Toulouse FC in the 1991–92 French Division 1 before returning to MFK Ružomberok. From the start of his career until the end of the 1994–95 season, he played 242 times in the Czechoslovak, and later Czech, top flights, scoring 60 goals. In 1995 he moved to the Slovak First League, where he continued to play for another seven seasons. In 2001 he became the oldest goalscorer in Slovak First League history at the age of 38 years, 9 months and 19 days, scoring twice in a 4–1 win for Ružomberok against Trenčín.

Hýravý played 11 times for Czechoslovakia, and was part of his nation's squad at the 1990 FIFA World Cup, although he didn't play in the final tournament.

After retirement, Hýravý worked as assistant coach of MFK Ružomberok and second-tier MŠK Fomat Martin.
