= Martin Šulek =

Slovak footballer

Personal information
- Date of birth: 15 January 1998 (age 28)
- Place of birth: Trenčín, Slovakia
- Height: 1.79 m (5 ft 10 in)
- Position: Defender

Team information
- Current team: Ružomberok
- Number: 18

Youth career
- –2008: TTS Trenčín
- 2008–2015: AS Trenčín

Senior career*
Years	Team	Apps	(Gls)
2015–2021	AS Trenčín	144	(5)
2022	Sereď	11	(0)
2022–2023	Wisła Płock	20	(0)
2023–2025	Spartak Trnava	36	(0)
2025–	Ružomberok	11	(0)

International career
2016–2020	Slovakia U21	17	(0)
2017	Slovakia	2	(0)
- * Club domestic league appearances and goals as of 17:18, 29 November 2025 (UTC)

Martin Šulek (born 15 January 1998) is a Slovak professional footballer who plays as a defender for Slovak First Football League club Ružomberok.

== Club career ==
=== Trenčin ===
Šulek made his Fortuna Liga debut for AS Trenčín against Slovan Bratislava on 20 September 2015. In the same season, he scored his first goal for Trenčin in a 5–2 win over Žilina, scoring in the 12th minute. Šulek played a total of 144 league games for Trenčin, in which he scored five goals.

In May 2022, Šulek signed for Polish side Wisła Płock.

=== Spartak Trnava ===
On 23 June 2023, it was announced Šulek would be joining Spartak Trnava, signing a two-year contract. He made his debut for the club in a 2–0 win over Železiarne Podbrezová, starting the match. Šulek’s first goal contribution came on 29 October 2023, in a league game against AS Trenčín assisting a goal scored by Philip Azango to increase the score to 3–2 in Spartak’s favor.

=== Ružomberok ===
On 11 July 2025, it was announced that Šulek would be leaving Spartak Trnava and would be joining Ružomberok. He made his debut for Ružomberok against his former club Spartak Trnava, coming on as a substitute in the 63rd minute for Adrián Slávik.

== International career ==
In January 2017, Šulek was called up for two unofficial friendly fixtures held in Abu Dhabi, United Arab Emirates, against Uganda and Sweden. He debuted on 8 January against the former, playing the first half before being replaced for Juraj Kotula at the beginning of the second half; Slovakia went on to lose the game 3–1. On 12 January, Šulek also played an entire match against Sweden in a 6–0 defeat.

== Honours ==
AS Trenčín

- Slovak First Football League: 2015–16
- Slovak Cup: 2015–16

Spartak Trnava

- Slovak Cup: 2024–25

Individual

- Slovak First Football League U-21 Team of the Season: 2019–20
