= Šimon Gabriel =

Czech footballer (born 2001)

Personal information
- Date of birth: 28 May 2001 (age 25)
- Place of birth: Czech Republic
- Height: 1.88 m (6 ft 2 in)
- Position: Centre back

Team information
- Current team: Slovan Liberec
- Number: 32

Youth career
- SK Zbraslav
- –2018: Sparta Prague
- 2018–2020: Viktoria Plzeň

Senior career*
Years	Team	Apps	(Gls)
2020–2023	Viktoria Plzeň	0	(0)
2020	→ Mladá Boleslav (loan)	4	(0)
2021	→ Teplice (loan)	14	(0)
2021–2022	→ Viktoria Žižkov (loan)	28	(1)
2022–2023	→ Vysočina Jihlava (loan)	28	(2)
2023–2024	Ružomberok	45	(1)
2025–	Slovan Liberec	25	(2)

International career
2016–2017	Czech Republic U16	14	(1)
2017–2018	Czech Republic U17	15	(1)
2018–2019	Czech Republic U18	14	(1)
2019–2020	Czech Republic U19	10	(0)
- * Club domestic league appearances and goals as of 4 February 2026

Šimon Gabriel (born 28 May 2001) is a Czech footballer who currently plays as a defender for Slovan Liberec.

== Personal life ==
Gabriel and his twin, Adam, are sons of former Czech Republic international Petr Gabriel.

== Career statistics ==
=== Club ===
As of 6 September 2020.

Club	Season	League			Cup		Continental		Other		Total	
Club	Season	Division	Apps	Goals	Apps	Goals	Apps	Goals	Apps	Goals	Apps	Goals
Viktoria Plzeň	2020–21	Czech First League	0	0	0	0	–		0	0	0	0
Mladá Boleslav (loan)	2020–21	Czech First League	2	0	0	0	–		0	0	2	0
Career total			2	0	0	0	0	0	0	0	2	0
