= Marko Kelemen =

Slovak international footballer (born 2000)

Personal information
- Full name: Marko Kelemen
- Date of birth: 29 April 2000 (age 26)
- Place of birth: Rožňava, Slovakia
- Height: 1.87 m (6 ft 2 in)
- Position: Forward

Team information
- Current team: Ružomberok
- Number: 26

Youth career
- 2009–2014: Rožňava
- 2015–2019: DAC Dunajská Streda

Senior career*
Years	Team	Apps	(Gls)
2019−2020	Spartak Trnava	7	(0)
2020	→ Zlaté Moravce (loan)	2	(0)
2020–2021	Kazincbarcika	9	(1)
2021	→ Putnok (loan)	13	(4)
2021−2022	Petržalka	26	(6)
2022−	Ružomberok	51	(6)
2023–2024	→ Haladás (loan)	24	(3)
2025	→ Gyirmót (loan)	9	(0)

International career
2016–2017	Slovakia U17	8	(1)
2022	Slovakia U21	1	(1)
- * Club domestic league appearances and goals as of 22 September 2026

Marko Kelemen (born 29 April 2000) is a Slovak footballer who plays as a forward for MFK Ružomberok.

== Club career ==
Kelemen made his Fortuna Liga debut for Spartak Trnava against iClinic Sereď on 21 July 2019.
