= David Jackuliak =

Slovak footballer (born 2003)

Personal information
- Date of birth: August 2, 2003 (age 23)
- Place of birth: Slovakia
- Height: 1.91 m (6 ft 3 in)
- Position: Centre-forward

Team information
- Current team: MFK Ružomberok
- Number: 13

Youth career
- 2017–2021: Dukla Banská Bystrica
- 2018–2019: Dunajská Streda (loan)

Senior career*
Years	Team	Apps	(Gls)
2021–2023	Dukla Banská Bystrica	9	(0)
2022–2023	Dolný Kubín (loan)	16	(4)
2023–	MFK Ružomberok	21	(0)
2024–2025	Baník Ostrava B	8	(1)
- * Club domestic league appearances and goals as of 25 May 2026

David Jackuliak (born 2 August 2003) is a Slovak footballer who currently plays for Slovak First Football League side MFK Ružomberok, as a centre forward.

Jackuliak started playing football in the youth academies of Banská Bystrica and Dunajská Streda. During the summer of 2023, he transferred to MFK Ružomberok, where he played in the winning final duel of the Slovnaft Cup against Spartak Trnava, as well as in the Conference League qualification matches against Hajduk Split and FC Noah.

== Club career ==
=== Dukla Banská Bystrica ===
Jackuliak is a graduate of the FK Dukla Banská Bystrica youth team. He scored a brace in a 3–2 loss against AS Trenčín in the U19 league. A few weeks later, Jackuliak scored a hat-trick in a 3–0 league win against Nitra on.

After impressing in Dukla's youth teams, Jackuliak was promoted to the main team by first-team manager Stanislav Varga near the end of the 2020/21 season. He debuted in a 4–1 win against MŠK Púchov in the 2. Liga, coming on off the bench in the 82 minute for Miladin Vujošević. Jackuliak got his first start in the last game of the season, a 2–1 loss against FC Petržalka. He helped the club finish second in the league, advancing to the Slovak First Football League. Jackuliak debuted in the first league in a 4–2 victory against FC ViOn Zlaté Moravce, playing a couple minutes. He went on to make a total of 5 appearances in the first league before leaving Dukla.

=== MFK Ružomberok ===
On 13 July 2023, it was announced that Jackuliak would be joining fellow league outfit MFK Ružomberok, signing a 3-year contract. The club was interested in signing him last summer, but he ultimately decided to stay in Dukla. Jackuliak scored his first goal for the roses in a 2–1 friendly win against FC Zorya Luhansk, scoring the winning goal in the 85th minute. He made his league debut in a 3–1 loss to MŠK Žilina. Jackuliak helped the club advance to the final of the 2023–24 Slovak Cup, where he featured for 11 minutes in a 1–0 win against Spartak Trnava.

==== Loan to Baník Ostrava ====
On 11 September 2024, it was announced that would be joining Czech side FC Baník Ostrava, where he would be transferred to the reserve team.

== Honors ==
MFK Ružomberok

- 2023–24 Slovak Cup
