= Juraj Kotula =

Slovak footballer (born 1995)

Personal information
- Full name: Juraj Kotula
- Date of birth: 30 September 1995 (age 31)
- Place of birth: Bratislava, Slovakia
- Height: 1.83 m (6 ft 0 in)
- Position: Right back

Team information
- Current team: USV Halbturn
- Number: 27

Youth career
- Slovan Bratislava

Senior career*
| Years | Team | Apps | (Gls) |
| 2015–2018 | Slovan Bratislava | 24 | (0) |
| 2017 | → Senica (loan) | 11 | (0) |
| 2018 | → ViOn Zlaté Moravce (loan) | 10 | (0) |
| 2018 | → Senica (loan) | 17 | (0) |
| 2019–2020 | Zbrojovka Brno | 11 | (0) |
| 2021–2023 | Zemplín Michalovce | 56 | (0) |
| 2023–2024 | Ružomberok | 11 | (0) |
| 2024–2025 | Dynamo České Budějovice | 4 | (0) |
| 2025–2026 | Tatran Prešov | 25 | (1) |
| 2026- | USV Halbturn | | |

International career^{‡}
| 2015–2016 | Slovakia U21 | 1 | (0) |
| 2017 | Slovakia | 1 | (0) |
- * Club domestic league appearances and goals as of 25 May 2026 ‡ National team caps and goals as of 6 November 2020

Juraj Kotula (born 30 September 1995) is a Slovak footballer who plays as a right-back for Austrian club USV Halbturn.

== Career ==
Kotula made his professional Slovak Super Liga debut for Slovan Bratislava on 27 February 2015 against Žilina.

In January 2017, Kotula was called up for two unofficial friendly fixtures held in Abu Dhabi, United Arab Emirates, against Uganda and Sweden. He debuted against the former by playing for the first half, only to be replaced by Martin Šulek at the start of the second half.

On 11 July 2024, Kotula signed a two-year contract with Dynamo České Budějovice.

In 2026, Kotula joined FC Tatran Prešov, where he made 25 league appearances during the 2025–26 season.

In the summer of 2026, Kotula joined Austrian club USV Halbturn on a free transfer. He was signed as a reinforcement for the club's defence ahead of the 2026–27 season.
