= Dávid Húska =

Slovak footballer (born 2003)

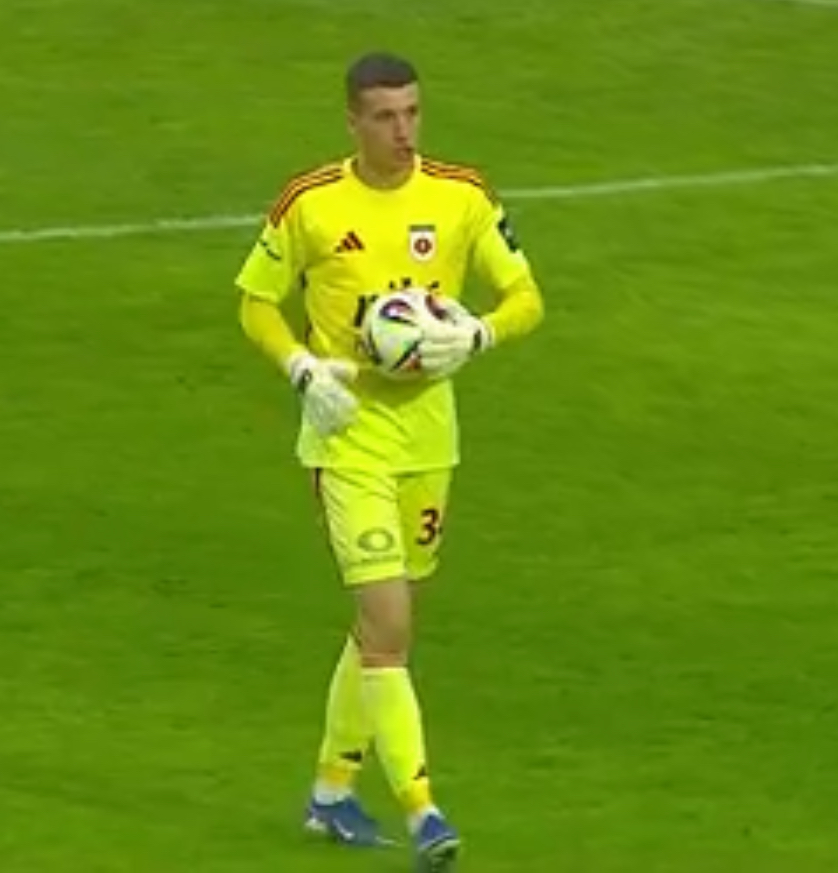
- Húska with Ružomberok

Personal information
- Date of birth: September 30, 2003 (age 23)
- Place of birth: Slovakia
- Position: Goalkeeper

Team information
- Current team: MFK Ružomberok
- Number: 34

Youth career
- –2022: Tatran Liptovský Mikuláš

Senior career*
Years	Team	Apps	(Gls)
2022–2025	Tatran Liptovský Mikuláš	19	(0)
2025–	MFK Ružomberok	16	(0)
- * Club domestic league appearances and goals as of 22 September 2026

Dávid Húska (born 30 September 2003) is a Slovak professional football player who currently plays for First Football League side MFK Ružomberok, as a goalkeeper.

== Club career ==
=== Liptovský Mikuláš ===
Húska is a graduate of the MFK Tatran Liptovský Mikuláš academy. He made his debut for the club while they played in the first league, playing the whole match of a 2–1 win against MFK Ružomberok. The following season, Liptovský Mikuláš played in the 2. Liga. Húsak played his first 2nd league game in a 2–0 loss against KFC Komárno following the injury of starting goalkeeper Matej Vajs. He continued to play the rest of the games in the season for Liptovský Mikuláš, raking up a total of 13 appearances, where he kept 2 clean sheets.

=== MFK Ružomberok ===
On 18 December 2024, it was announced that Húska would be joining Slovak First Football League club MFK Ružomberok, signing as a back-up for Dominik Ťapaj. He would sign a four-year contract with the side. He made his debut for the club in a 2–1 win against MŠK Žilina. Húska came on off the bench at half-time for an injured Ťapaj, keeping a clean sheet in the 45 minutes he played. A few days later, he played in a 4–2 defeat to FC Košice in the quarter-finals of the Slovak Cup. After the departure of Dominik Ťapaj in the winter transfer window, Húska was offered a chance to try become the new starting goalkeeper. He got his first start in the league in a 1–0 win against league new comers Tatran Prešov, playing the whole game.
