= Daniel Köstl =

Czech footballer (born 1998)

Personal information
- Full name: Daniel Köstl
- Date of birth: 23 May 1998 (age 28)
- Place of birth: Prague, Czech Republic
- Height: 1.89 m (6 ft 2 1/2 in)
- Position: Centre back

Team information
- Current team: MFK Ružomberok
- Number: 16

Youth career
- 2014–: Sparta Prague

Senior career*
Years	Team	Apps	(Gls)
2016–2019	Sparta Prague	0	(0)
2018–2019	→ Slovan Liberec (loan)	2	(0)
2019–2024	Bohemians 1905	138	(6)
2024–	MFK Ružomberok	53	(2)

International career
2014–2015	Czech Republic U17	7	(0)
2016	Czech Republic U19	3	(1)
- * Club domestic league appearances and goals as of 22 September 2026

Daniel Köstl (born 23 May 1998) is a Czech footballer who plays as a centre back for MFK Ružomberok.

== Club career ==
=== Early career ===
Born in Prague in 1998, Köstl started his football career with Sparta Prague youth team in 2014.

=== Sparta Prague ===
In 2016, Köstl was called up for Sparta Prague first team. On 12 October 2016, Köstl made his senior team debut in Czech Cup against České Budějovice at Stadion Střelecký ostrov, replacing David Lafata at the 90th minute by coach David Holoubek. On 24 November 2016 Köstl played against Southampton in the matchday five of 2016–17 UEFA Europa League group stage, replacing Lukáš Juliš at the 90+3rd minute.

== Club career statistics ==
Club performance			League		Cup		continental		Total	
Season	Club	League	Apps	Goals	Apps	Goals	Apps	Goals	Apps	Goals
Czech Republic			League		Czech Cup		Europe		Total	
2016–17	Sparta Prague	Czech First League	0	0	2	0	1	0	3	0
Total	Czech Republic		0	0	2	0	1	0	3	0
Total	Career total		0	0	2	0	1	0	3	0
