= Adrián Slávik =

Slovak football defender

Personal information
- Full name: Adrián Slávik
- Date of birth: 12 April 1999 (age 27)
- Place of birth: Považská Bystrica, Slovakia
- Height: 1.78 m (5 ft 10 in)
- Position: Defender

Team information
- Current team: MFK Ružomberok
- Number: 7

Youth career
- 2008–2016: TJ Priehrada Udiča
- 2011–2013: Púchov
- 2013–2018: Trenčín

Senior career*
Years	Team	Apps	(Gls)
2018–2022	Trenčín	42	(0)
2021	→ Dubnica nad Váhom	3	(0)
2022–2023	Dukla Banská Bystrica	32	(1)
2023–2024	Jablonec	7	(0)
2024	→ Othellos Athienou (loan)	13	(2)
2024–2025	Železiarne Podbrezová	15	(0)
2025–	MFK Ružomberok	12	(0)

International career
2016	Slovakia U17	2	(0)
- * Club domestic league appearances and goals as of 25 May 2026

Adrián Slávik (born 12 April 1999) is a Slovak professional footballer who plays as a defender for Slovak First Football League side MFK Ružomberok, joining in the summer transfer window of 2025.

== Club career ==
=== AS Trenčín ===
Slávik made his Fortuna Liga debut for AS Trenčín against Žilina on 27 May 2018 during a 2-1 away victory, coming on as a second-half replacement for Trinidadian international Keston Julien.
