= Ján Maslo =

Slovak footballer

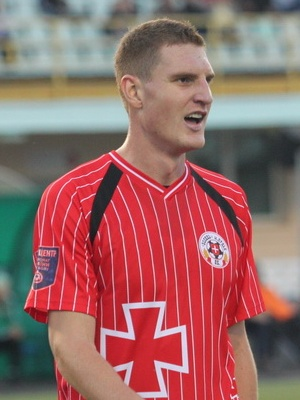

Personal information
- Full name: Ján Maslo
- Date of birth: 5 February 1986 (age 40)
- Place of birth: Dolný Kubín, Czechoslovakia
- Height: 1.96 m (6 ft 5 in)
- Position: Centre back

Team information
- Current team: Ružomberok
- Number: 3

Youth career
- 1993–2000: Dlhá nad Oravou
- 2001–2004: Ružomberok

Senior career*
Years	Team	Apps	(Gls)
2005–2011	Ružomberok	120	(9)
2011–2014	Volyn Lutsk	60	(1)
2014	Shakhter Karagandy	10	(1)
2015–2025	Ružomberok	246	(22)
Total		436	(33)

International career^{‡}
	Slovakia U20	3	(0)
2007–2008	Slovakia U21	7	(0)
- * Club domestic league appearances and goals as of 25 June 2025 ‡ National team caps and goals as of 29 December 2019

Ján Maslo (born 5 February 1986) was a Slovak professional footballer who last played for Ružomberok in the Niké Liga.

== Club career ==
He began his professional football career at MFK Ružomberok, where he also played in the youth teams. In Ružomberok, he became a stable pillar of defense under the leadership of coach Ladislav Jurkemik. He won the league title with the club in the 2005/06 season. In July 2011, he transferred to the Ukrainian club FC Volyn Lutsk for 0.5 million euros, where he signed a three-year contract.

In July 2014, he transferred to the Kazakh club FC Shakhter Karagandy. He appeared with Karaganda in the 2014/15 UEFA Europa League.

At the end of January 2015, he returned to Slovakia to the club MFK Ružomberok, where he signed a six-month contract. He played with Ružomberok in the 2017/18 UEFA Europa League.

On 20 May 2025, he announced his retirement from professional football.

== Honours ==
Ruzomberok

- 2023–24 Slovak Cup winners.

Individual

- Slovak Super Liga Player of the Month: October 2021
