= Timotej Múdry =

Slovak under-21 international footballer

Personal information
- Full name: Timotej Múdry
- Date of birth: 4 April 2000 (age 26)
- Place of birth: Spišský Hrušov, Slovakia
- Height: 1.77 m (5 ft 10 in)
- Position: Midfielder

Team information
- Current team: Ružomberok
- Number: 6

Youth career
- 2009–2010: OKŠ Spišský Hrušov
- 2010–2014: Spišská Nová Ves
- 2014–2018: Tatran Prešov
- 2018–2019: Ružomberok

Senior career*
Years	Team	Apps	(Gls)
2017–2018	Tatran Prešov B	8	(2)
2017–2018	Tatran Prešov	4	(0)
2018–2020	Ružomberok B	20	(1)
2019–	Ružomberok	140	(2)
2022–2023	→ ViOn Zlaté Moravce (loan)	26	(0)

International career^{‡}
2020–2021	Slovakia U21	4	(0)
- * Club domestic league appearances and goals as of 25 May 2026 ‡ National team caps and goals as of 10 October 2021

Timotej Múdry (born 4 April 2000) is a Slovak professional footballer who plays for Ružomberok, as a midfielder.

== Club career ==
=== 1. FC Tatran Prešov ===
Múdry made his Fortuna Liga debut for Tatran Prešov against Zemplín Michalovce on 3 November 2017, replacing Roland Černák, who had provided for the winning goal earlier, in the 85th minute.
