= Jan Hladík (footballer) =

Czech footballer

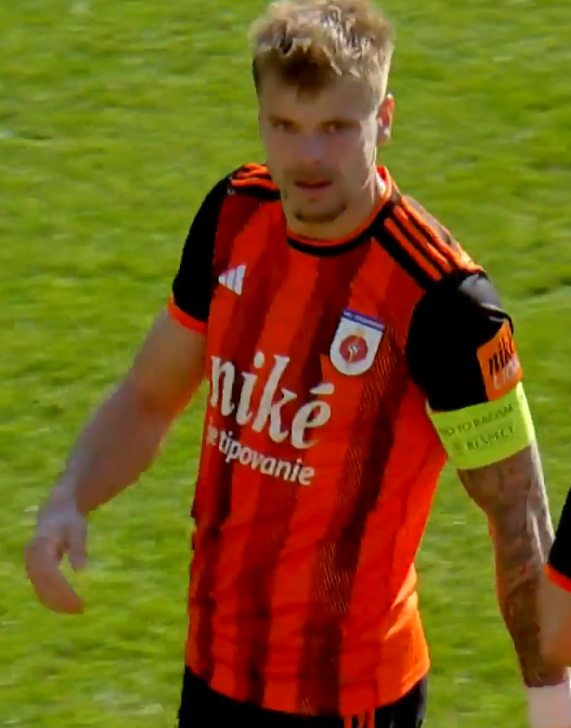
- Hladík playing for MFK Ružomberok

Personal information
- Date of birth: 21 September 1993 (age 33)
- Place of birth: Znojmo, Czech Republic
- Height: 1.83 m (6 ft 0 in)
- Position: Striker

Team information
- Current team: Ružomberok
- Number: 14

Youth career
- 2002–2006: Sokol Dobšice
- 2006–2011: Znojmo
- 2011–2014: Sigma Olomouc

Senior career*
Years	Team	Apps	(Gls)
2014–2019	Sigma Olomouc "B"	57	(15)
2017	→ Prostějov (loan)	13	(2)
2017–2018	→ Znojmo (loan)	16	(0)
2018	→ Uničov	14	(5)
2018–2019	Viktoria Otrokovice	29	(16)
2019	SK Líšeň	15	(5)
2020–2023	Zbrojovka Brno	114	(16)
2023–	Ružomberok	86	(18)
- * Club domestic league appearances and goals as of 22 September 2026

Jan Hladík (born 29 September 1993) is a Czech professional footballer who plays for Ružomberok in Niké Liga as a striker.

== Career ==
=== MFK Ružomberok ===
Good performances in the League Cup gave him a chance to play in the qualifying rounds of the UEFA Europa League in the 2024–25 season, where they first advanced through FC Tobol, but then were eliminated by Turkish giants Trabzonspor. The Slovak team led by Czech coach Ondřej Smetana then continued to qualify for at least participation in the Conference League. There, they first passed through the Croatian side Hajduk Split but then unexpectedly were eliminated by FC Noah. The Czech striker played 8 matches in European cups, and scored 1 goal, 2 assists and 1 yellow card.

== Honors ==
Ružomberok

- Slovak Cup 2023/24 winners
- Slovak Cup 2024–25 runners-up
