= Dominik Ťapaj =

Slovak footballer (born 2004)

Personal information
- Date of birth: 10 May 2004 (age 22)
- Place of birth: Slovakia
- Height: 1.93 m (6 ft 4 in)
- Position: Goalkeeper

Team information
- Current team: FC Viktoria Plzeň
- Number: 1

Youth career
- 2012: FK Slovan Trstená
- 2017–2019: Námestovo
- 2019–2022: Ružomberok

Senior career*
Years	Team	Apps	(Gls)
2022–2026	Ružomberok	45	(0)
2026–	FC Viktoria Plzeň	1	(0)

International career^{‡}
2024	Slovakia U21	1	(0)
- * Club domestic league appearances and goals as of 26 May 2026 ‡ National team caps and goals as of 31 May 2025

Dominik Ťapaj (born 10 May 2004) is a Slovak professional footballer who plays for FC Viktoria Plzeň as a goalkeeper.

== Club career ==
Ťapaj made his Fortuna Liga debut for Ružomberok against MFK Zemplín Michalovce at Štadión pod Čebraťom on 21 May 2022, he kept a clean sheet in the match. He played his second game for Ružomberok in a 2:0 win against Spartak Trnava, aged only 18 years old.

== International career ==
Ťapaj made his international debut for the Slovakia U21 team on 11 June 2024, against Moldova U21. Slovakia lost the game 1:0.
