= Alexander Mojžiš =

Slovak footballer

Personal information
- Date of birth: 2 January 1999 (age 27)
- Place of birth: Krupina, Slovakia
- Height: 1.83 m (6 ft 0 in)
- Position: Left back

Team information
- Current team: Ružomberok
- Number: 2

Youth career
- –2010: OTJ Hontianske Nemce
- 2010–2017: Dukla Banská Bystrica
- 2017–2018: Železiarne Podbrezová

Senior career*
Years	Team	Apps	(Gls)
2017–2018	Železiarne Podbrezová B	13	(0)
2018–2019	Železiarne Podbrezová	18	(1)
2019–	Ružomberok	161	(5)
2023–2024	→ Debrecen (loan)	7	(0)

International career^{‡}
2019–2020	Slovakia U21	3	(0)
- * Club domestic league appearances and goals as of 22 September 2026 ‡ National team caps and goals as of 17 November 2020

Alexander Mojžiš (born 2 January 1999) is a Slovak professional footballer who plays for Ružomberok as a defender.

== Club career ==
=== FK Železiarne Podbrezová ===
Mojžiš made his Fortuna Liga debut for Železiarne Podbrezová against ViOn Zlaté Moravce on 19 May 2018 in a 1:0 home win. He played the entire match.

== International career ==
Mojžiš was first recognised in Slovak senior national team nomination on 16 March 2022 by Štefan Tarkovič as an alternate ahead of two international friendly fixtures against Norway and Finland and repeated the same recognition ahead of four scheduled competitive UEFA Nations League fixtures in June. Following Tarkovič's dismissal, Mojžiš was first shortlisted in a nomination by Francesco Calzona, who joined the side in late summer, for senior national team prospective players' training camp at NTC Senec.

== Personal life ==
Alexander has twin brother Viktor who plays for amateur team of Partizán Osrblie.
