= Alexander Selecký =

Slovak football defender

Personal information
- Full name: Alexander Selecký
- Date of birth: 8 October 2002 (age 24)
- Place of birth: Lučatín, Slovakia
- Position: Defender

Team information
- Current team: Ružomberok
- Number: 28

Youth career
- 2012–2014: FK - 34 Brusno - Ondrej
- 2014: ŠK CVČ Brusno
- 2014–2017: Jupie Futbalová škola Mareka Hamšíka
- 2017–2021: Ružomberok

Senior career*
Years	Team	Apps	(Gls)
2021–	Ružomberok	106	(6)

International career^{‡}
2018–2019	Slovakia U17	2	(0)
- * Club domestic league appearances and goals as of 22 September 2026 ‡ National team caps and goals as of 27 October 2018

Alexander Selecký (born 8 October 2002) is a Slovak professional footballer who currently plays for Niké Liga club Ružomberok as a defender.

== Club career ==
=== MFK Ružomberok ===
Selecký made his Fortuna Liga debut for MFK Ružomberok against FK Senica on 24 July 2021. He played the entire match.
