= Štefan Gerec =

Slovak footballer

Personal information
- Full name: Štefan Gerec
- Date of birth: 10 November 1992 (age 34)
- Place of birth: Ľubochňa, Czechoslovakia
- Height: 1.76 m (5 ft 9 in)
- Position: Forward

Team information
- Current team: Ružomberok
- Number: 29

Youth career
- FK Ľubochňa
- Ružomberok

Senior career*
Years	Team	Apps	(Gls)
2012–2025	Ružomberok	221	(33)
2013	→ DAC Dunajská Streda (loan)	12	(4)
2013–2014	→ ŽP Šport Podbrezová (loan)	36	(15)
2015–2016	→ Tatran Liptovský Mikuláš (loan)	37	(15)
2025–2026	Dukla Banská Bystrica	28	(8)
2026–	Ružomberok	2	(0)

International career
- Slovakia U18
- * Club domestic league appearances and goals as of 22 September 2026

Štefan Gerec (born 10 November 1992) is a Slovak professional footballer who plays for Ružomberok.

== Club career ==
=== MFK Ružomberok ===
He made his debut for Ružomberok against Dukla Banská Bystrica on 28 July 2012, in a 1–0 win. In the 86th minute Gerec came on to the pitch, replacing Štefan Pekár, who scored the game's only goal, in the 60th minute. Before the end of the season, Gerec came on as a substitute two more times against Slovan Bratislava and Senica.
