= Oliver Luterán =

Slovak football midfielder

Personal information
- Full name: Oliver Luterán
- Date of birth: 6 September 2001 (age 25)
- Place of birth: Kendice, Slovakia
- Height: 1.77 m (5 ft 10 in)
- Position: Midfielder

Team information
- Current team: Ružomberok
- Number: 4

Youth career
- –2018: Tatran Prešov
- 2019–2020: Poprad

Senior career*
Years	Team	Apps	(Gls)
2019	Tatran Prešov	9	(0)
2020	Poprad	17	(2)
2021–	Ružomberok	142	(1)
- * Club domestic league appearances and goals as of 22 September 2026

Oliver Luterán (born 6 September 2001) is a Slovak professional footballer, and he plays for Ružomberok as a midfielder.

== Club career ==
=== MFK Ružomberok ===
Luterán made his Fortuna Liga debut for Ružomberok against Žilina at pod Dubňom, on 6 March 2021, replacing Marek Zsigmund.
