= Štadión pod Čebraťom =

Football stadium in Ružomberok, Slovakia

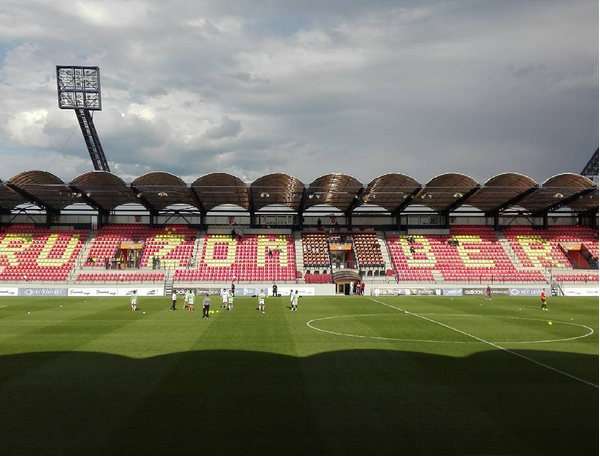
- Interactive map of Štadión pod Čebraťom
- Location: Žilinská cesta 21 Ružomberok, Slovakia
- Coordinates: 49°4′57″N 19°17′2″E
- Owner: MFK Ružomberok
- Capacity: 4,876
- Surface: Grass
- Record attendance: 24,000 (Ružomberok vs Handlová, 26 Feb 1971)
- Field size: 105 x 68 m

Construction
- Opened: 17 April 1955
- Renovated: 1998, 2006, 2014–2015
- Cost: Expansion 30 million SKK in 1998

Tenant
- MFK Ružomberok

Website
- www.mfkruzomberok.sk

Štadión pod Čebraťom (Slovak pronunciation: [ˈʂtadijɔːn pɔt ˈtʂebracɔm]) is a multi-purpose stadium in Ružomberok, Slovakia. It is currently used mostly for football matches and is the home ground of MFK Ružomberok. It is named after the hill Čebrať, adjacent to which it is located, and the name of the stadium literally means "Stadium under the Čebrať Hill." The stadium holds 4,876 people. The intensity of the floodlighting is 1,400 lux.

== History ==
The stadium was built in 1955 and used for football matches of MFK Ružomberok sport club. The original capacity was more than 20,000 (mostly for standing) spectators. In 1998 old stands were demolished and new west stand for 2,536 spectators was built. In 2006, new east stand for 2,340 spectators was built.

In 2013, a project to modernize football stadiums in Slovakia began, for which the Slovak government allocated a total subsidy of 45 million euros over 10 years (4.5 million per year). The total amount for the stadium under Čebrať costed 1 million euros.

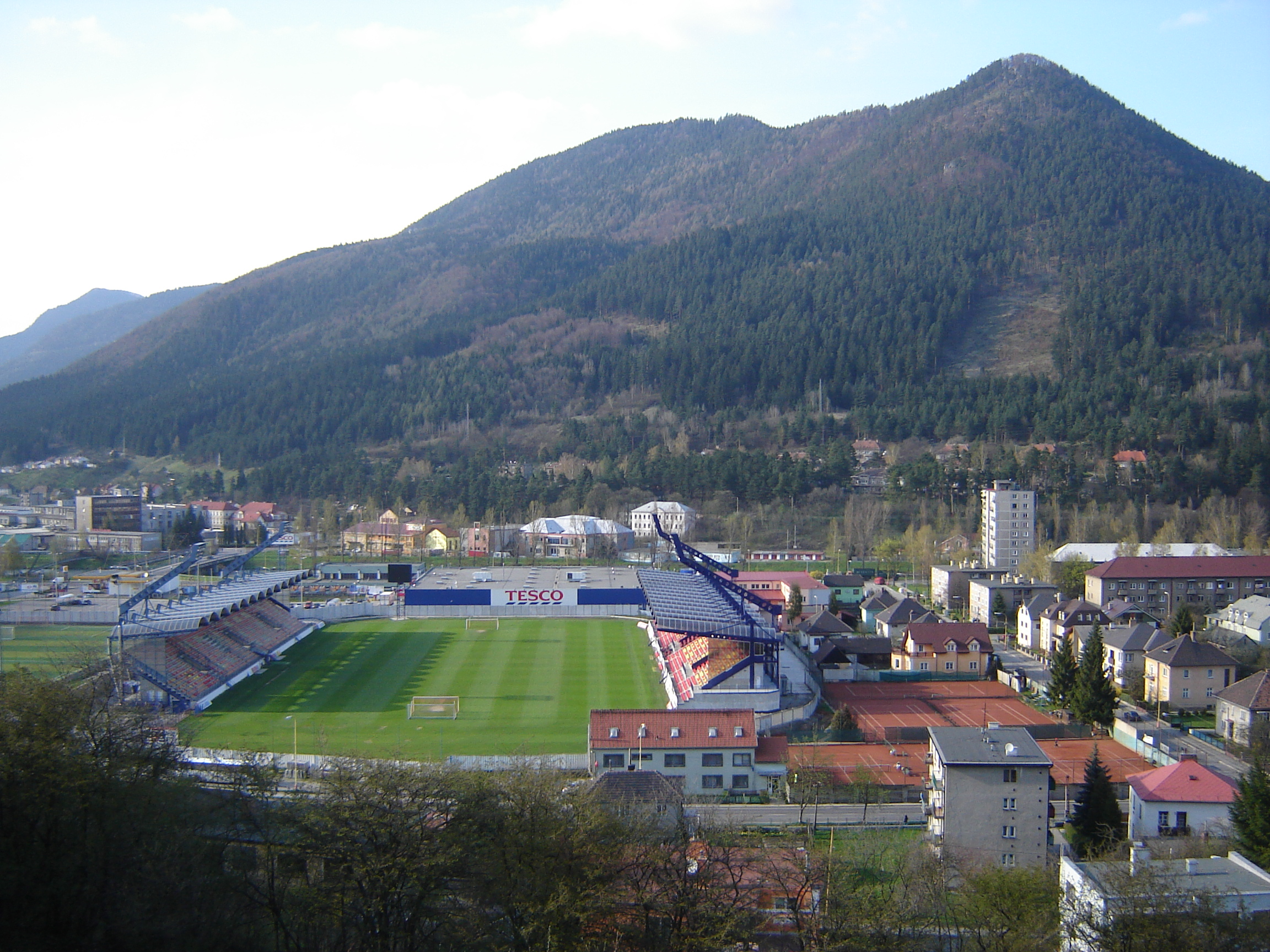
The stadium is named after the hill Čebrať.

In the past, the Czechoslovak national football team was brought to the stadium by local native, coach Jozef Vengloš. The team played unofficial friendly matches at the stadium. In modern history, the stadium hosted a UEFA Champions League match against CSKA Moscow in 2006. In 2010, the stadium hosted a friendly match between Ružomberok and English club Leeds United, in which the home side won the game 1–0. In 2017, the stadium hosted a match in the 3rd qualifying round of the Europa League against Everton FC.

== Photo gallery ==
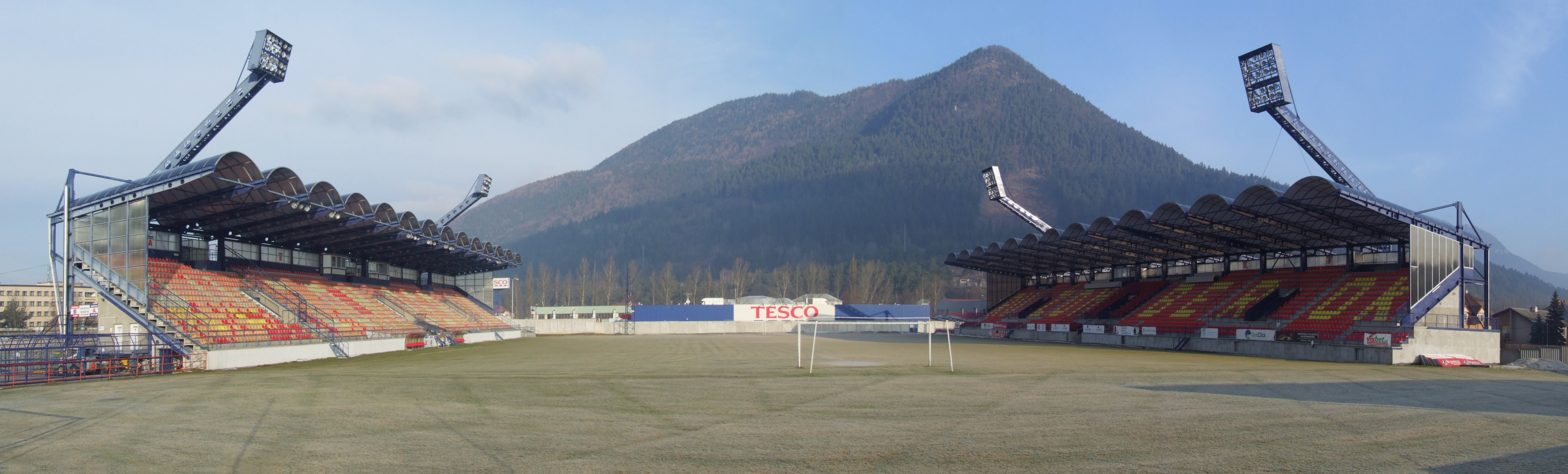
