= Adam Tučný =

Slovak footballer

Personal information
- Full name: Adam Tučný
- Date of birth: 21 May 2002 (age 24)
- Place of birth: Dunajská Streda, Slovakia
- Height: 1.77 m (5 ft 10 in)
- Position: Forward

Team information
- Current team: Ružomberok
- Number: 17

Youth career
- 2009–2014: Dunajská Streda
- 2014–2019: Slovan Bratislava
- 2019–2020: AS Trenčín

Senior career*
Years	Team	Apps	(Gls)
2020–2022	AS Trenčín	39	(4)
2022–	Ružomberok	110	(9)

International career^{‡}
2021–	Slovakia U19	1	(0)
2021–	Slovakia U21	4	(1)
- * Club domestic league appearances and goals as of 22 September 2026 ‡ National team caps and goals as of 28 March 2022

Adam Tučný (born 21 May 2002) is a Slovak footballer who plays for MFK Ružomberok in the Niké Liga as a forward.

== Club career ==
=== AS Trenčín ===
Tučný made his Fortuna Liga debut for AS Trenčín during a home 4:0 victory over Pohronie on 13 June 2020. Tučný came on after 77 minutes of play to replace Osman Bukari, who set the score to the final result of 4:0 earlier in the second half.

Tučný scored his first goal for Trenčín in his 9th appearance in a league fixture against Zemplín Michalovce on 13 December 2020. Similarly, he came on as a substitute after 77 minutes of play, this time replacing Jakub Kadák, as Trenčín was two down. In less than five minutes he narrowed the lead with a left-foot shot only for Milan Corryn to equalise the game after three further minutes and setting the final score at 2:2.

=== MFK Ružomberok ===
In June 2022, Tučný signed a three-year deal with Ružomberok.

== International career ==
In December 2022, Tučný was first recognised in a Slovak senior national team nomination and was immediately shortlisted by Francesco Calzona for prospective players' training camp at NTC Senec.
