= MFK Ružomberok =

Association football club in Slovakia

Ružomberok
- Full name: Mestský Futbalový klub Ružomberok
- Nickname: Ruža (The Rose)
- Founded: 1906; 120 years ago (as Rózsahegyi Sport Club)
- Ground: Štadión pod Čebraťom, Ružomberok
- Capacity: 4,876
- Owner: Milan Fiľo
- Chairman: Ľubomír Golis
- Head coach: Michal Ščasný
- League: Slovak First Football League
- 2025–26: 10th
- Website: www.mfkruzomberok.sk
Home colours	Away colours

MFK Ružomberok (Slovak pronunciation: [ˈruʐɔmberɔk]) is a Slovak professional football club playing in the city of Ružomberok.

== History ==
Established in 1906, the club's colours have been traditionally white, yellow and red, which are also featured on the town's flag. However, the sponsor Mondi Business Paper SCP introduced new colours in 2005: orange, black and white.

In 1993 the club gained promotion to the Slovak Second Division for the first time and a second promotion to the Corgoň Liga in 1997. The club's trophy cabinet stayed empty until their centenary year, when in 2006 they lifted both the Corgoň Liga title and the Slovak Cup with the help of 21 goals from the league's joint top scorer Erik Jendrišek. Other stars of the team in this successful season were Jan Nezmar and Marek Sapara. The team was coached at that time by František Komňacký who in February 2007 went on to SKVO Rostov-on-Don.Corgoň liga: Komňacký v Ružomberku skončil

The league win gained them entry into the Champions league second qualifying stage, there they met Swedish side Djurgårdens IF, Ružomberok lost the first leg 1–0 but managed to pull back the deficit to win 3–2 on aggregate. The next round saw them meet Russian champions CSKA Moscow, the team lost conceding 5 goals without reply.

=== Events timeline ===
- 1906 – Founded as Concordia Ružomberok
- 1948 – Merged with SBZ Ruzomberok and Sokola SBZ Ružomberok
- 1953 – Renamed DSO Iskra Ružomberok
- 1955 – Revocation of the merger and renamed Iskra Ružomberok
- 1957 – Renamed TJ BZVIL Ružomberok
- 1989 – Renamed TJ BZ Ružomberok
- 1992 – Renamed ŠK Texicom Ružomberok
- 1995 – Renamed MŠK Ružomberok
- 1996 – Renamed MŠK SCP Ružomberok, Slovak 2nd League champion
- 2001 – First European qualification, 2001–02 UEFA Cup
- 2003 – Renamed MFK Ružomberok
- 2006 – Slovak champion, Slovak FA Cup winner
- 2006 – Champions League qualification, 3rd round
- 2017 – European League qualification, 3rd round
- 2024 - Europa Conference League play-off
- 2024 – Slovak FA Cup winner

== Honours ==
=== Domestic ===
- Slovak First Football League (1993–)
  - Winners (1): 2005–06
  - Runners-up (1): 2021–22
- Slovenský Pohár (Slovak Cup)
  - Winners (2): 2005–06, 2023–24
  - Runners-up (4): 2000–01, 2017–18, 2019–20, 2024–25

== Transfers ==
MFK have produced numerous players that have gone on to represent the Slovak national football team. Over the last period there has been a steady increase of young players leaving Ružomberok after a few years of first-team football and moving on to play football in leagues of a higher standard, mostly Czech First League (Igor Žofčák and Juraj Kucka to Sparta Prague in 2007 and 2009, Maroš Klimpl and Tomáš Oravec to Viktoria Žižkov in 2001 and 2002, Dušan Švento to SK Slavia Prague in 2005, Marián Had to Brno in 2004, Marek Bakoš to Viktoria Plzeň in 2009, and Tomáš Ďubek to Slovan Liberec in 2014), Belgian Pro League (Martin Regáli to K.V. Kortrijk in 2023). In 2005–06 best goalscorer Erik Jendrišek moved to German Hannover 96. In 2017 Michal Faško moved to Swiss Grasshopper. The top transfer was agreed in 2006 when 24 years old attacking midfielder Marek Sapara moved to Norwegian champion Rosenborg BK for a fee €1.3 million. They also received 25% from Bobcek´s transfer from Lechia Gdańsk to Frosinone which was €2.7million.

=== Record transfers ===
Rank	Player	To	Fee	Year
1.	(Slovakia) Marek Sapara	(Norway) Rosenborg Trondheim	€1.3 million	2006
2.	(Slovakia) Tomáš Bobček	(Poland) Lechia Gdańsk	€0.6 million*	2023
2.	(Slovakia) Dominik Ťapaj	(Czech Republic) FC Viktoria Plzeň	€0.6 million	2026
4.	(Slovakia) Martin Regáli	(Belgium) K.V. Kortrijk	€0.55 million*	2023
5.	(Slovakia) Ján Maslo	(Ukraine) Volyn Lutsk	€0.5 million	2011
5.	(Slovakia) Erik Jendrišek	(Germany) 1. FC Kaiserslautern	€0.5 million	2007
5.	(Slovakia) Erik Jendrišek	(Germany) Hannover 96	€0.5 million loan	2006
5.	(Slovakia) Dominik Kružliak	(Slovakia) Dunajská Streda	€0.5 million	2019
9.	(Slovakia) Ladislav Almási	(Czech Republic) Baník Ostrava	€0.47 million	2021
10.	(Slovakia) Tomáš Frühwald	(Czech Republic) Bohemians 1905	€0.4 million	2024

*-unofficial fee

== Sponsorship ==
Period	Kit manufacturer	Shirt sponsor
1998–99	Erreà	SCP
1999–2002	Adidas	SCP
2002–04	Diadora	NEUSIEDLER
2004–07	Umbro	NEUSIEDLER SCP
2007–08	Legea	Mondi SCP
2008–12	Umbro	Mondi SCP
2012–13	Adidas	Mondi SCP
2013–2021	Adidas	Mondi
2021-2022	Adidas	TAURIS
2023-	Adidas	Niké

=== Club partners ===
- Mondi SCP
- ECO-INVEST
- Harmony
- TAURIS
- Harmanec-Kuvert
- City of Ružomberok
- Stavpoč
- Tatrapeko
- Včela Lippek

== Current squad ==
Updated 14 September 2026 Note: Flags indicate national team as defined under FIFA eligibility rules; some limited exceptions apply. Players may hold more than one non-FIFA nationality.

No.	Pos.	Nation	Player
1	GK	SVK	Ivan Krajčírik (on loan from Slovan Liberec)
2	DF	SVK	Alexander Mojžiš
3	MF	SVK	Peter Doroš
4	MF	SVK	Oliver Luterán
5	DF	SVK	Tomáš Maruśin
7	DF	SVK	Adrián Slávik
8	MF	SVK	Ján Murgaš
9	FW	CZE	Matěj Koubek
10	MF	CZE	Filip Souček
11	MF	SVK	Samuel Lavrinčík (on loan from Jablonec)
13	FW	SVK	David Jackuliak
14	FW	CZE	Jan Hladík
15	MF	SVK	Martin Bačík
16	DF	CZE	Daniel Köstl

No.	Pos.	Nation	Player
17	MF	SVK	Adam Tučný
19	FW	CZE	Vojtěch Hranoš
20	MF	SVK	Marián Chobot
22	MF	CZE	Tomáš Buchvaldek
23	DF	SVK	Daniel Prekop
25	MF	SRB	Dario Grgić (on loan from Sigma Olomouc)
26	FW	SVK	Marko Kelemen
28	DF	SVK	Alexander Selecký
29	MF	SVK	Štefan Gerec
30	FW	SVK	Martin Boďa
31	MF	CZE	Dominik Kostka
33	GK	SVK	Boris Halada
34	GK	SVK	Dávid Húska
35	GK	SVK	Attila Horvath

For recent transfers, see List of Slovak football transfers summer 2026.

=== Out on loan 2025–26 ===
Note: Flags indicate national team as defined under FIFA eligibility rules; some limited exceptions apply. Players may hold more than one non-FIFA nationality.

No.	Pos.	Nation	Player
5	MF	SVK	Rudolf Božík (at MŠK Považská Bystrica until 15 June 2026)
23	DF	SVK	Giuliano Antonio Marek (at Tatran Liptovský Mikuláš until 25 January 2026)

No.	Pos.	Nation	Player

=== Retired number(s) ===
- 12 – Concordia 1906 (the 12th Man)

== Staff ==
Position	Name
Owner	(Slovakia) Milan Fiľo
General director	(Slovakia) Ľubomír Golis
Sport director	TBA
Manager	(Czech Republic) Michal Ščasný
Assistant coach	(Slovakia) Jozef Kapláň
Goalkeeping coach	(Slovakia) Milan Penksa, Marek Rodák
Youth coach	(Slovakia) Ľuboš Hajdúch
Medical Staff	(Slovakia) MUDr. František Rigo, MUDr. Tibor Letko
Masseur	(Slovakia) Juraj Hervartovský
Custodian	(Slovakia) Drahomír Bobák

== Results ==
=== League and Cup history ===
Slovak League only (1993–present)

Season	Division (Name)	Pos./Teams	Pl.	W	D	L	GS	GA	P	Slovak Cup	Europe		Top Scorer (Goals)
1993–94	2nd (1. Liga)	11/(16)	30	12	5	13	48	53	29	First round			
1994–95	2nd (1. Liga)	6/(16)	30	14	2	14	47	33	44	First round			
1995–96	2nd (1. Liga)	6/(16)	30	14	5	11	54	44	47	First round			(Slovakia) Eduard Mydliar (13)
1996–97	2nd (1. Liga)	1/(18)	34	23	5	6	78	19	78	Semi-finals			(Slovakia) Viliam Hýravý (18)
1997–98	1st (Mars Superliga)	11/(16)	30	9	9	12	35	49	36	First round			(Slovakia) Eduard Mydliar (7)
1998–99	1st (Mars Superliga)	7/(16)	30	12	10	8	31	31	46	Quarter-finals			(Slovakia) Eduard Mydliar (9)
1999–00	1st (Mars Superliga)	7/(16)	30	13	7	10	29	26	46	Second round			(Slovakia) Eduard Mydliar (7)
2000–01	1st (Mars Superliga)	3/(10)	36	15	10	11	51	48	55	Runners-up			(Slovakia) Tomáš Oravec (11)
2001–02	1st (Mars Superliga)	4/(10)	36	15	9	12	49	41	54	Second round	UC	R1 ( (France) Troyes)	(Slovakia) Tomáš Oravec (9)
2002–03	1st (Slovak Super Liga)	8/(10)	36	12	7	17	45	60	43	First round			(Slovakia) Roland Števko (12)
2003–04	1st (Corgoň Liga)	3/(10)	36	15	10	11	53	47	55	First round			(Slovakia) Roland Števko (22)
2004–05	1st (Corgoň Liga)	7/(10)	36	11	10	15	50	57	43	Second round			(Slovakia) Roland Števko (11)
2005–06	1st (Corgoň Liga)	1/(10)	36	26	2	8	65	28	80	Winners			(Slovakia) Erik Jendrišek (21)
2006–07	1st (Corgoň Liga)	4/(12)	28	10	7	11	25	29	37	Second round	CL; UC	QR3 ( (Russia) CSKA); R1 (Belgium) (Club Brugge)	(Slovakia) Róbert Rák (11)
2007–08	1st (Corgoň Liga)	7/(12)	33	10	14	9	46	43	44	Third round			(Slovakia) Marek Bakoš (10)
2008–09	1st (Corgoň Liga)	5/(12)	33	12	11	10	48	34	47	Semi-finals			(Slovakia) Miloš Lačný (11)
2009–10	1st (Corgoň Liga)	5/(12)	33	13	8	12	33	35	47	Third round			(Ukraine) Oleksandr Pyschur (11)
2010–11	1st (Corgoň Liga)	7/(12)	33	10	11	12	23	33	41	Quarter-finals			(Czech Republic) Karel Kroupa (5)
2011–12	1st (Corgoň Liga)	6/(12)	33	11	11	11	39	34	44	Second round			(Slovakia) Pavol Masaryk (18)
2012–13	1st (Corgoň Liga)	6/(12)	33	12	9	12	36	46	45	Quarter-finals			(Slovakia) Tomáš Ďubek (13)
2013–14	1st (Corgoň Liga)	4/(12)	33	15	5	13	56	51	50	Semi-finals			(Cameroon) Léandre Tawamba (13)
2014–15	1st (Fortuna Liga)	7/(12)	33	10	10	13	41	45	40	Second round			(Slovakia) Pavol Masaryk (9)
2015–16	1st (Fortuna Liga)	6/(12)	33	12	9	12	42	41	45	Semi-finals			(Slovakia) Miloš Lačný (10)
2016–17	1st (Fortuna Liga)	3/(12)	30	15	7	8	55	38	52	Fifth Round			(Czech Republic) Jakub Mareš (14)
2017–18	1st (Fortuna Liga)	6/(12)	31	10	10	11	36	35	40	Runners-up	EL	Q3 ( (England) Everton)	(Bosnia and Herzegovina) Nermin Haskić (7)
2018–19	1st (Fortuna Liga)	3/(12)	32	15	11	6	50	31	56	Fifth Round			(Bosnia and Herzegovina) Ismar Tandir (9) (Albania) Kristi Qose (9)
2019–20	1st (Fortuna Liga)	5/(12)	27	7	11	9	28	33	32	Runners-up	EL	Q1 ( (Bulgaria) Levski Sofia)	(Czech Republic) Filip Twardzik (7)
2020–21	1st (Fortuna Liga)	8/(12)	32	10	9	13	41	44	39	Round of 16	EL	Q1 ( (Switzerland) Servette)	(Slovakia) Martin Regáli (11)
2021–22	1st (Fortuna Liga)	2/(12)	32	17	12	3	58	23	63	Round of 16			(Slovakia) Martin Regáli (10)
2022–23	1st (Fortuna Liga)	7/(12)	32	12	11	9	43	31	47	Round of 16	ECL	Q2 ( (Latvia) Riga FC)	(Slovakia) Štefan Gerec (9)
2023–24	1st (Niké Liga)	5/(12)	32	12	11	9	38	43	47	Winner			(Slovakia) Martin Boďa (5)
2024–25	1st (Niké Liga)	10/(12)	32	10	6	16	35	50	36	Runners-Up	EL; ECL	Q2 ( (Turkey) Trabzonspor); P-O ( (Armenia) FC Noah)	(Czech Republic) Jan Hladík (10)
2025–26	1st (Niké Liga)	10/(12)	32	8	11	13	34	50	35	Round of 16			(Czech Republic) Jan Hladík (5)

=== European competition history ===
Season	Competition	Round	Club	Home	Away	Aggregate
2001–02	UEFA Cup	Qualifying round	(Belarus) Belshina Bobruisk	3–1	0–0	3–1
2001–02	UEFA Cup	First round	(France) Troyes	1–0	1–6	2–6
2006–07	UEFA Champions League	Second qualifying round	(Sweden) Djurgarden	3–1	0–1	3–2
2006–07	UEFA Champions League	Third qualifying round	(Russia) CSKA Moscow	0–2	0–3	0–5
2006–07	UEFA Cup	First round	(Belgium) Club Brugge	0–1	1–1	1–2
2017–18	UEFA Europa League	First qualifying round	(Serbia) Vojvodina Novi Sad	2–0	1–2	3–2
2017–18	UEFA Europa League	Second qualifying round	(Norway) Brann	0–1	2–0	2–1
2017–18	UEFA Europa League	Third qualifying round	(England) Everton	0–1	0–1	0–2
2019–20	UEFA Europa League	First qualifying round	(Bulgaria) Levski Sofia	0–2	0–2	0–4
2020–21	UEFA Europa League	First qualifying round	(Switzerland) Servette	—N/a	0−3	—N/a
2022–23	UEFA Europa Conference League	First qualifying round	(Lithuania) Kauno Žalgiris	2–0	0–0	2–0
2022–23	UEFA Europa Conference League	Second qualifying round	(Latvia) Riga	0–3	1–2	1–5
2024–25	UEFA Europa League	First qualifying round	(Kazakhstan) Tobol	5–2	0−1	5−3
2024–25	UEFA Europa League	Second qualifying round	(Turkey) Trabzonspor	0–2	0–1	0–3
2024–25	UEFA Conference League	Third qualifying round	(Croatia) Hajduk Split	0–0	1–0	1–0
2024–25	UEFA Conference League	Play-off round	(Armenia) FC Noah	3–1	0–3	3–4

== Player records ==
=== Most goals ===
#	Nat.	Name	Goals
1	(Slovakia)	Roland Števko	59
2	(Slovakia)	Tomáš Ďubek	45
3	(Slovakia)	Miloš Lačný	44
4	(Slovakia)	Eduard Mydliar	36
5	(Slovakia)	Štefan Gerec	33
6	(Slovakia)	Ján Maslo	31
7	(Slovakia)	Erik Jendrišek	30
7	(Slovakia)	Martin Regáli	30
8	(Slovakia)	Pavol Masaryk	28
9	(Slovakia)	Štefan Zošák	27
10	(Czechoslovakia) (Slovakia)	Viliam Hýravý	26
11	(Czech Republic)	Jan Nezmar	24

Players whose name is listed in bold are still active.

==== Slovak League top goalscorer ====
Slovak League top goalscorer since 1993–94

Year	Winner	G
2003–04	(Slovakia) Roland Števko	17
2005–06	(Slovakia) Erik Jendrišek	21^{1}
2011–12	(Slovakia) Pavol Masaryk	18

^{1}Shared award

== Notable players ==
Had international caps for their respective countries. Players whose name is listed in bold represented their countries while playing for MFK.

Past (and present) players who are the subjects of Wikipedia articles can be found here.

- (Slovakia) Ladislav Almási
- (Slovakia) Peter Babnič
- (Slovakia) Marek Bakoš
- (Slovakia) Tomáš Bobček
- (Moldova) Anatol Cheptine
- (Slovakia) Martin Chrien
- (Armenia) Gagik Daghbashyan
- (Slovakia) **Ondrej Debnár**
- (Slovakia) **Tomáš Ďubek**
- (Slovakia) Michal Faško
- (Slovakia) Marián Had
- (Slovakia) **Ľuboš Hajdúch**
- (Bosnia and Herzegovina) Nermin Haskić
- (Czechoslovakia) (Slovakia) **Viliam Hýravý**
- (Slovakia) Ivan Hodúr
- (Slovakia) Martin Jakubko
- (Slovakia) Erik Jendrišek
- (Slovakia) Maroš Klimpl
- (Belarus) Uladzimir Karytska
- (Slovakia) Matúš Kmeť
- (North Macedonia) **Tihomir Kostadinov**
- (Slovakia) Juraj Kotula
- (Slovakia) Pavel Kováč
- (Slovakia) Ivan Kozák
- (Slovakia) **Dominik Kružliak**
- (Slovakia) **Juraj Kucka**
- (Slovakia) Richard Lásik
- (Czech Republic) Jiří Novotný
- (Kenya) **Patrick Oboya**
- (Slovakia) **Tomáš Oravec**
- (North Macedonia) Dejan Peševski
- (Estonia) Artur Pikk
- (Albania) Kristi Qose
- (Slovakia) **Marek Sapara**
- (Slovakia) **Martin Regáli**
- (Slovakia) Tomáš Rigo
- (Slovakia) Štefan Senecký
- (Czech Republic) Jiří Skalák
- (Belarus) Valery Strypeykis
- (Slovakia) Dušan Švento
- (Slovakia) **Rudolf Urban**
- (North Macedonia) Yani Urdinov
- (Slovakia) Ľubomír Talda
- (Cameroon) Léandre Tawamba
- (Czechoslovakia) **Viktor Tegelhoff**
- (North Macedonia) Darko Tofiloski
- (Slovakia) Ivan Trabalík
- (Slovakia) Tibor Zátek
- (Slovakia) Adam Zreľák
- (Slovakia) Vladislav Zvara
- (Slovakia) **Igor Žofčák**

== Managers ==
- (Slovakia) Ladislav Jurkemik (1998–99)
- (Slovakia) Mikuláš Komanický (2001–02)
- (Slovakia) Jozef Vukušič (2003–04)
- (Slovakia) Ľubomír Moravčík (2004–05)
- (Czech Republic) František Komňacký (2005–07)
- (Czech Republic) Petr Uličný (2007)
- (Czech Republic) Přemysl Bičovský (2007–08)
- (Slovakia) Ladislav Jurkemik (2008)
- (Czech Republic) Michal Bílek (1 July 2008 – 30 Jun 2009)
- (Czech Republic) František Straka (1 Jun 2009 – 30 Jun 2010)
- (Slovakia) Ladislav Jurkemik (1 July 2010 – 15 Oct 2010)
- (Serbia) Goran Milojević (16 Oct 2010 – 31 Mar 2011)
- (Slovakia) Ladislav Jurkemik (1 Apr 2011 – Sep 22, 2011)
- (Czech Republic) Aleš Křeček (Sept 22, 2011 – 30 June 2012)
- (Slovakia) Ladislav Šimčo (1 July 2012 – 30 June 2013)
- (Slovakia) Jozef Vukušič (1 July 2013 – 17 March 2014)
- (Czech Republic) Jozef Chovanec (17 Mar 2014 – 30 Jun 2014)
- (Slovakia) Ladislav Šimčo (5 June 2014 – 17 Nov 2014)
- (Slovakia) Ivan Galád (17 Nov 2014 – Sept 2, 2015)
- (Slovakia) Ladislav Pecko (Sept 11, 2015 – 30 May 2016)
- (Slovakia) Norbert Hrnčár (30 May 2016 – 30 May 2018)
- (Czech Republic) David Holoubek (4 June 2018 – May 2019)
- (Slovakia) Ján Haspra (May 2019 - 27 May 2021)
- (Slovakia) Peter Struhár (31 May 2021 – 29 May 2023)
- (Slovakia) Peter Tomko (5 June 2023 – 24 Oct 2023)
- (Czech Republic) Ondřej Smetana (24 Oct 2023 – 13 Nov 2024)
- (Czech Republic) Radim Kučera (13 Nov 2024 – 20 Dec 2024)
- (Slovakia) Norbert Hrnčár (20 Dec 2024 – 8 Apr 2025)
- (Czech Republic) Ondřej Smetana (9 Apr 2025 – 12 Jan 2026)
- (Czech Republic) Jaroslav Köstl (13 Jan 2026 – 10 Nov 2026)
- (Czech Republic) Michal Ščasný (11 Nov 2026 -)

== Reserve team ==
MFK Ružomberok B is the reserve team of MFK Ružomberok.

=== History ===
Ružomberok B's best result in Slovak 2. liga was a 7th position in 2009–10 season and 2011–12 season. In May 2012 the club withdrew from the Slovak 2. liga. Their place in the league was taken by FC ŠTK 1914 Šamorín. Notable former players which later played First league were: Štefan Pekár, Libor Hrdlička, Juraj Dovičovič, Lukáš Greššák, Juraj Dovičovič and Roland Števko.

=== Season to season ===
Season	Division	Place
2007–08	3. liga	1st (promoted)
2008–09	2. liga	8th
2009–10	2. liga	7th
2010–11	2. liga	10th
2011–12	2. liga	7th

- **4** seasons in Slovak 2. liga

=== Former managers ===
- (Slovakia) Ivan Hucko (2004–05)
- (Slovakia) Ladislav Molnár (2008)
- (Slovakia) Roman Berta
- (Slovakia) Ján Haspra
- (Slovakia) Vladimír Rusnák (2011–12)
- (Slovakia) Viliam Hýravý

== See also ==
- Slovak football clubs in European competitions
