= List of Slovak football transfers winter 2022–23 =

Notable Slovak football transfers in the winter transfer window 2022–23 by club. Only transfers of the Fortuna liga and 2. liga are included.

== Fortuna Liga ==
=== ŠK Slovan Bratislava ===
In: Note: Flags indicate national team as defined under FIFA eligibility rules; some limited exceptions apply. Players may hold more than one non-FIFA nationality.

No.	Pos.	Nation	Player
—	MF	SVK	Filip Lichý (loan return from MFK Ružomberok)
—	FW	SUI	Adler Da Silva (loan return from MFK Zemplín Michalovce)
—	FW	GHA	Zuberu Sharani (on loan from (Ghana) Dreams)
—	DF	GAM	Maudo Jarjué (on loan from (Sweden) IF Elfsborg)
—	FW	GHA	Malik Abubakari (on loan from (Sweden) Malmö FF)

Out: Note: Flags indicate national team as defined under FIFA eligibility rules; some limited exceptions apply. Players may hold more than one non-FIFA nationality.

No.	Pos.	Nation	Player
—	FW	SVN	Žan Medved (on loan to MFK Skalica)
—	MF	NGA	Ibrahim Rabiu (Released)
—	MF	SVK	David Hrnčár (on loan to (Belgium) S.K. Beveren)
—	DF	SUR	Myenty Abena (to (Hungary) Ferencvárosi TC)
—	MF	BIH	Alen Mustafić (to (Denmark) Odense Boldklub)
—	FW	SRB	Ivan Šaponjić (on loan to (Turkey) Bandırmaspor)
—	FW	VEN	Eric Ramírez (loan return to (Ukraine) FC Dynamo Kyiv)

=== MFK Ružomberok ===
In: Note: Flags indicate national team as defined under FIFA eligibility rules; some limited exceptions apply. Players may hold more than one non-FIFA nationality.

No.	Pos.	Nation	Player

Out: Note: Flags indicate national team as defined under FIFA eligibility rules; some limited exceptions apply. Players may hold more than one non-FIFA nationality.

No.	Pos.	Nation	Player
—	FW	SVK	Martin Regáli (to (Belgium) K.V. Kortrijk)
—	MF	SVK	Adam Morong (to MFK Skalica)
—	MF	SVK	Michal Dopater (on loan to FK Humenné)
—	DF	SVK	Jakub Luka (on loan to MFK Dolný Kubín)
—	MF	SVK	Filip Lichý (loan return to ŠK Slovan Bratislava)

=== FC Spartak Trnava ===
In: Note: Flags indicate national team as defined under FIFA eligibility rules; some limited exceptions apply. Players may hold more than one non-FIFA nationality.

No.	Pos.	Nation	Player
—	DF	CZE	Filip Twardzik (on loan from (Austria) LASK)
—	FW	NGA	Kenneth Ikugar (loan return from FK Slavoj Trebišov)
—	FW	GHA	Kelvin Ofori (from (Germany) SC Paderborn 07)

Out: Note: Flags indicate national team as defined under FIFA eligibility rules; some limited exceptions apply. Players may hold more than one non-FIFA nationality.

No.	Pos.	Nation	Player
11	FW	NGA	Sudais Ali Baba (to (Greece) Panserraikos F.C.)
3	DF	SVK	Gergely Tumma (on loan to MFK Tatran Liptovský Mikuláš)
14	FW	GHA	Kelvin Boateng (on loan to (Czech Republic) MFK Karviná)
—	FW	NGA	Kenneth Ikugar (on loan to FC ViOn Zlaté Moravce)

=== FC DAC 1904 Dunajská Streda ===
In: Note: Flags indicate national team as defined under FIFA eligibility rules; some limited exceptions apply. Players may hold more than one non-FIFA nationality.

No.	Pos.	Nation	Player
―	DF	ESP	Alex Méndez (from MFK Zemplín Michalovce)
—	DF	UKR	Danylo Beskorovaynyi (loan return from (Kazakhstan) Astana)
—	FW	GRE	Giannis Niarchos (from Zlaté Moravce)
—	MF	BRA	Riquelme (from (Brazil) Corinthians U20)
—	FW	MNE	Matija Krivokapić (from (Montenegro) FK Podgorica)
—	FW	SVK	Zoran Záhradník (on loan from MFK Zemplín Michalovce)

Out: Note: Flags indicate national team as defined under FIFA eligibility rules; some limited exceptions apply. Players may hold more than one non-FIFA nationality.

No.	Pos.	Nation	Player
14	DF	LVA	Andrejs Cigaņiks (to (Poland) Widzew Łódź)
—	MF	UKR	Danylo Beskorovaynyi (to (Ukraine) Kryvbas Kryvyi Rih)
—	FW	MNE	Matija Krivokapić (on loan to MFK Zemplín Michalovce)
—	MF	CRO	Andrija Balić (on loan to MFK Dukla Banská Bystrica)
—	FW	SVK	Zoran Záhradník (on loan to FC ŠTK 1914 Šamorín)

=== MŠK Žilina ===
In: Note: Flags indicate national team as defined under FIFA eligibility rules; some limited exceptions apply. Players may hold more than one non-FIFA nationality.

No.	Pos.	Nation	Player
—	GK	SVK	Matej Slávik (on loan from MŠK Považská Bystrica)
—	FW	SRB	Boris Krstić (from MŠK Žilina B)
—	DF	CMR	James Ndjeungoue (from MŠK Žilina B)
—	FW	CMR	Loic Essomba (from MŠK Žilina B)
—	FW	CIV	Eric Bile (from (Ghana) MŠK Žilina Africa F.C.)

Out: Note: Flags indicate national team as defined under FIFA eligibility rules; some limited exceptions apply. Players may hold more than one non-FIFA nationality.

No.	Pos.	Nation	Player
—	FW	NGA	Taofiq Jibril (Released and joined (Armenia) FC Ararat)
—	MF	SVK	Patrik Myslovič (on loan to (Scotland) Aberdeen F.C.)
—	GK	SVK	Marek Teplan (on loan to MŠK Považská Bystrica)
—	FW	SVK	Vladimír Trabalík (to MŠK Žilina B)

=== AS Trenčín ===
In: Note: Flags indicate national team as defined under FIFA eligibility rules; some limited exceptions apply. Players may hold more than one non-FIFA nationality.

No.	Pos.	Nation	Player
—	FW	NGA	Lekan Okunola (from (Nigeria) Obazz FC)
—	FW	SVK	Ľuboš Praženka (from AS Trenčín U19)
—	FW	SVK	Jakub Murko (from AS Trenčín U19)
—	DF	SVK	Roman Šebeň (from AS Trenčín U19)
―	FW	NED	Dabney dos Santos (from Free agent)

Out: Note: Flags indicate national team as defined under FIFA eligibility rules; some limited exceptions apply. Players may hold more than one non-FIFA nationality.

No.	Pos.	Nation	Player
17	FW	SVK	Lucas Demitra (on loan to Zlaté Moravce)
—	MF	ARG	Cristian Ramírez (Released and joined (Greece) Egaleo F.C.)
—	MF	SVK	Samuel Lavrinčík (to TBD)
—	FW	SVK	Lukáš Letenay (on loan to MŠK Púchov)
—	MF	IDN	Witan Sulaeman (to (Indonesia) Persija Jakarta)

=== MFK Tatran Liptovský Mikuláš ===
In: Note: Flags indicate national team as defined under FIFA eligibility rules; some limited exceptions apply. Players may hold more than one non-FIFA nationality.

No.	Pos.	Nation	Player
—	DF	SVK	Gergely Tumma (on loan from FC Spartak Trnava)
—	MF	NGA	David Fadairo (on loan from MŠK Rimavská Sobota)
―	MF	SRB	Strahinja Pavišić (from (Georgia (country)) FC Telavi)
―	FW	SVK	René Dedič (on loan from (Czech Republic) FK Třinec)
―	MF	SVK	Christián Steinhübel (from FK Pohronie)
―	DF	UKR	Ivan Spychka (from (Poland) Concordia Elbląg)
―	GK	SVK	Martin Polaček (from (Czech Republic) FK Mladá Boleslav)

Out: Note: Flags indicate national team as defined under FIFA eligibility rules; some limited exceptions apply. Players may hold more than one non-FIFA nationality.

No.	Pos.	Nation	Player
—	MF	SVK	Adrián Káčerík (to FK Dukla Banská Bystrica)
—	MF	SVK	Ivan Kotora (Released)
—	FW	SVK	Adam Matoš (Released)
—	DF	SVK	Lukáš Bielák (Released)
—	MF	SVK	Peter Ďungel (on loan to MŠK Považská Bystrica)
—	DF	SVK	Mário Mihál (loan return to FC Spartak Trnava)
—	MF	SVK	Marko Totka (to TBA)
—	GK	CZE	Denis Gröger (to TBA)

=== MFK Zemplín Michalovce ===
In: Note: Flags indicate national team as defined under FIFA eligibility rules; some limited exceptions apply. Players may hold more than one non-FIFA nationality.

No.	Pos.	Nation	Player
―	DF	SVK	Jaroslav Holp (from MFK Zemplín Michalovce U19)
―	DF	MNE	Zvonko Ceklić (from (Kazakhstan) FC Turan)
―	DF	BIH	Saša Marjanović (from (Croatia) HNK Gorica)
—	MF	ALB	Kristi Qose (from (Czech Republic) FC Viktoria Plzeň)
—	FW	MNE	Matija Krivokapić (on loan from FC DAC 1904 Dunajská Streda)

Out: Note: Flags indicate national team as defined under FIFA eligibility rules; some limited exceptions apply. Players may hold more than one non-FIFA nationality.

No.	Pos.	Nation	Player
—	FW	SUI	Adler Da Silva (loan return to ŠK Slovan Bratislava)
―	DF	ESP	Alex Méndez (to DAC 1904 Dunajská Streda)
―	DF	CZE	Michal Jeřábek (Released)
—	GK	SVK	Matej Vajs (on loan to MFK Dolný Kubín)
―	DF	SVK	Jakub Sova (on loan to FK Slavoj Trebišov)
—	FW	SVK	Zoran Záhradník (on loan to FC DAC 1904 Dunajská Streda)

=== FC ViOn Zlaté Moravce ===
In: Note: Flags indicate national team as defined under FIFA eligibility rules; some limited exceptions apply. Players may hold more than one non-FIFA nationality.

No.	Pos.	Nation	Player
—	DF	SVK	Róbert Stareček (from FC ViOn Zlaté Moravce U19)
—	FW	SVK	Lucas Demitra (on loan from AS Trenčín)
—	FW	SVK	Roman Čerepkai (on loan from (Czech Republic) FK Teplice)
—	FW	NGA	Kenneth Ikugar (on loan from FC Spartak Trnava)
―	DF	UKR	Nazariy Gavrylyuk (from Free agent)

Out: Note: Flags indicate national team as defined under FIFA eligibility rules; some limited exceptions apply. Players may hold more than one non-FIFA nationality.

No.	Pos.	Nation	Player
—	MF	IDN	Egy Maulana Vikri (Released and joined (Indonesia) Dewa United F.C.)
—	FW	GRE	Giannis Niarchos (to FC DAC 1904 Dunajská Streda)
—	FW	SVK	Tomáš Horák (Released)
—	FW	SVK	Sebastián Rák (on loan to TJ Družstevník Veľké Ludince)

=== FK Železiarne Podbrezová ===
In: Note: Flags indicate national team as defined under FIFA eligibility rules; some limited exceptions apply. Players may hold more than one non-FIFA nationality.

No.	Pos.	Nation	Player
—	MF	SVK	Patrik Blahút (from FK Pohronie)
—	FW	MNE	Bogdan Veljić (from (Serbia) FK Partizan U19)
—	GK	SVK	Michal Lukáč (from DAC Dunajská Streda U19)
—	GK	CZE	Matěj Luksch (on loan from (Czech Republic) SK Dynamo České Budějovice)
—	MF	CIV	Moussa Sangare (from (Denmark) FC Nordsjælland)
—	DF	SVK	Richard Hečko (from (Italy) Atalanta U19)
—	DF	SVK	Dávid Ovšonka (from FK Železiarne Podbrezová U19)
—	MF	SVK	Šimon Faško (from FK Železiarne Podbrezová U19)
―	MF	CZE	Christophe Kabongo (on loan from (Belgium) Lommel)

Out: Note: Flags indicate national team as defined under FIFA eligibility rules; some limited exceptions apply. Players may hold more than one non-FIFA nationality.

No.	Pos.	Nation	Player
6	MF	SVK	Michal Breznaník (Released and joined TJ Baník Kalinovo)
8	MF	SVK	Erik Grendel (to FK Pohronie)
99	MF	NGA	Moses Cobnan (to (Russia) FC Krasnodar)
—	GK	SVK	Ivan Rehák (on loan to FK Pohronie)
—	DF	SVK	Boris Godál (on loan to (Saudi Arabia) Al-Adalah FC)
—	FW	SVK	Marek Belko (on loan to FK Pohronie)
—	DF	SVK	Patrik Hanes (on loan to FK Pohronie)
—	FW	MNE	Bogdan Veljić (on loan to FK Pohronie)
—	MF	GHA	Derrick Bonsu (on loan to FK Pohronie)

=== MFK Dukla Banská Bystrica ===
In: Note: Flags indicate national team as defined under FIFA eligibility rules; some limited exceptions apply. Players may hold more than one non-FIFA nationality.

No.	Pos.	Nation	Player
—	MF	SVK	Adrián Káčerík (from MFK Tatran Liptovský Mikuláš)
—	MF	SVK	Gabriel Demian (from (Germany) 1. FC Nürnberg U19)
—	DF	ARG	Nicolás Ezequiel Gorosito (from Free agent)
—	MF	CRO	Andrija Balić (on loan from FC DAC 1904 Dunajská Streda)

Out: Note: Flags indicate national team as defined under FIFA eligibility rules; some limited exceptions apply. Players may hold more than one non-FIFA nationality.

No.	Pos.	Nation	Player
93	MF	SVK	Lukáš Gašparovič (Released)
—	MF	SVK	Peter Mazan (to FK Pohronie)
—	DF	CTA	Cyriaque Mayounga (Released)
19	DF	SVK	Patrik Prikryl (to FK Pohronie)
—	DF	SVK	Martin Slaninka (to (Czech Republic) FK Třinec)

=== MFK Skalica ===
In: Note: Flags indicate national team as defined under FIFA eligibility rules; some limited exceptions apply. Players may hold more than one non-FIFA nationality.

No.	Pos.	Nation	Player
—	FW	SVN	Žan Medved (on loan from ŠK Slovan Bratislava)
—	MF	SVK	Adam Morong (from MFK Ružomberok)
—	DF	SVK	Adam Krčík (on loan from (Czech Republic) MFK Karviná)

Out: Note: Flags indicate national team as defined under FIFA eligibility rules; some limited exceptions apply. Players may hold more than one non-FIFA nationality.

No.	Pos.	Nation	Player
—	DF	SVK	Peter Čögley (End of professional career)
—	FW	SVK	Daniel Šebesta (End of professional career)
—	MF	SVK	Denis Potoma (Released and joined (Poland) Sandecja Nowy Sącz)
—	FW	CZE	Ondřej Štursa (Released and joined (Austria) Siegendorf)
—	MF	CZE	Martin Petr (on loan to FK Rača)
77	FW	SVK	Jaroslav Mihalík (Released)

== 2. liga ==
=== FK Pohronie ===
In: Note: Flags indicate national team as defined under FIFA eligibility rules; some limited exceptions apply. Players may hold more than one non-FIFA nationality.

No.	Pos.	Nation	Player
—	MF	SVK	Erik Grendel (from FK Železiarne Podbrezová)
—	MF	SVK	Peter Mazan (from FK Dukla Banská Bystrica)
—	FW	SVK	Marek Belko (on loan from FK Železiarne Podbrezová)
—	DF	SVK	Patrik Hanes (on loan from FK Železiarne Podbrezová)
—	DF	SVK	Patrik Prikryl (from FK Dukla Banská Bystrica)
—	MF	SVK	Filip Mráz (on loan from MŠK Žilina)
—	GK	SVK	Ivan Rehák (on loan from FK Železiarne Podbrezová)
—	FW	MNE	Bogdan Veljić (on loan from FK Železiarne Podbrezová)
—	MF	GHA	Derrick Bonsu (on loan from FK Železiarne Podbrezová)
—	DF	SVK	Vladimír Majdan (on loan from FC Košice)
―	FW	NGA	Ridwan Sanusi (on loan from ŠKF Sereď)

Out: Note: Flags indicate national team as defined under FIFA eligibility rules; some limited exceptions apply. Players may hold more than one non-FIFA nationality.

No.	Pos.	Nation	Player
—	MF	SVK	Patrik Blahút (to FK Železiarne Podbrezová)
89	GK	SVK	Patrik Le Giang (Released and joined (Vietnam) Hanoi Police FC)
70	GK	SVK	Filip Regitko (Released)
38	DF	SVK	Martin Klabník (Released)
99	MF	SVK	Marián Šmatlák (Released)
—	MF	BRA	Mateus (Released)
11	MF	SVK	Christián Steinhübel (Released)
8	FW	SVK	Ondrej Cíferský (Released)
—	FW	SVK	Patrik Abrahám (Released)
—	MF	SVK	Ivan Straka (on loan to MFK Dolný Kubín)
—	MF	CZE	Dan Ožvolda (to KFC Komárno)
—	GK	NZL	Cameron Hogg (to (Sweden) Umeå FC)
—	MF	BFA	Cedric Badolo (to (Moldova) FC Sheriff Tiraspol)

=== KFC Komárno ===
In: Note: Flags indicate national team as defined under FIFA eligibility rules; some limited exceptions apply. Players may hold more than one non-FIFA nationality.

No.	Pos.	Nation	Player
—	MF	CZE	Dan Ožvolda (from FK Pohronie)
—	MF	SVK	Miroslav Antal (from FK Rača)

Out: Note: Flags indicate national team as defined under FIFA eligibility rules; some limited exceptions apply. Players may hold more than one non-FIFA nationality.

No.	Pos.	Nation	Player
—	MF	SVK	Péter Varga (to FC Košice (2018))

=== FC Košice ===
In: Note: Flags indicate national team as defined under FIFA eligibility rules; some limited exceptions apply. Players may hold more than one non-FIFA nationality.

No.	Pos.	Nation	Player
—	FW	SVK	Miloš Lačný (from Polis Diraja Malaysia FC)
—	DF	CZE	Martin Šindelář (from (Czech Republic) MFK Karviná)
—	MF	SVK	Péter Varga (from KFC Komárno)
—	FW	MKD	Valmir Nafiu (on loan from (North Macedonia) KF Shkëndija)
—	DF	SVK	Bernard Petrák (on loan from (Poland) Odra Opole)

Out: Note: Flags indicate national team as defined under FIFA eligibility rules; some limited exceptions apply. Players may hold more than one non-FIFA nationality.

No.	Pos.	Nation	Player
—	FW	SVK	Boris Gáll (on loan to FK Slavoj Trebišov)
—	DF	SVK	Vladimír Majdan (on loan to FK Pohronie)

=== FK Humenné ===
In: Note: Flags indicate national team as defined under FIFA eligibility rules; some limited exceptions apply. Players may hold more than one non-FIFA nationality.

No.	Pos.	Nation	Player
—	MF	UKR	Maksym Losiev (on loan from MFK Snina)
—	GK	SVK	Erik Makó (on loan from MŠK Tesla Stropkov)
—	GK	SVK	Adrián Knurovský (on loan from 1. FC Tatran Prešov)
—	MF	SVK	Michal Dopater (on loan from MFK Ružomberok)
—	DF	NED	Justen Kranthove (on loan from (Czech Republic) Slovan Liberec B)
—	FW	POL	Franciszek Wróblewski (from (Poland) Radomiak Radom)
—	DF	ARM	Abov Avetisyan (from (Hungary) Kisvárda FC II)

Out: Note: Flags indicate national team as defined under FIFA eligibility rules; some limited exceptions apply. Players may hold more than one non-FIFA nationality.

No.	Pos.	Nation	Player
—	FW	SVK	Tomáš Vaľovčin (loan return to MŠK Žilina B)
—	GK	SVK	Filip Piroščák (Released)
—	MF	SVK	Denis Jančo (Released)
—	MF	SVK	Sven Jurčišin (Released)
—	FW	SVK	Peter Rypák (Released)
—	DF	SVK	Martin Luberda (End of professional career and joined MŠK Tesla Stropkov)
—	DF	SVK	Samuel Kuc (loan return to (Poland) Stal Rzeszów)
—	MF	SVK	Jakub Sedláček (Released)

=== FC ŠTK 1914 Šamorín ===
In: Note: Flags indicate national team as defined under FIFA eligibility rules; some limited exceptions apply. Players may hold more than one non-FIFA nationality.

No.	Pos.	Nation	Player
—	FW	SVK	Zoran Záhradník (on loan from FC DAC 1904 Dunajská Streda)

Out: Note: Flags indicate national team as defined under FIFA eligibility rules; some limited exceptions apply. Players may hold more than one non-FIFA nationality.

No.	Pos.	Nation	Player

=== FC Petržalka ===
In: Note: Flags indicate national team as defined under FIFA eligibility rules; some limited exceptions apply. Players may hold more than one non-FIFA nationality.

No.	Pos.	Nation	Player
—	MF	SVK	Lukáš Gašparovič (from MFK Dukla Banská Bystrica)
—	MF	ENG	Dave Assuncao (from (England) Quorn F.C.)
—	DF	MLI	Arnaud Konan (from (Czech Republic) FK Dukla Prague)

Out: Note: Flags indicate national team as defined under FIFA eligibility rules; some limited exceptions apply. Players may hold more than one non-FIFA nationality.

No.	Pos.	Nation	Player
—	MF	SVK	Richard Lásik (to (Austria) FC Andau)
—	DF	SVK	Tomáš Stášik (to (Austria) FC Andau)
—	DF	SVK	Marek Pittner (Released)
—	GK	UKR	Vadym Shevchuk (End of professional career)

=== MŠK Žilina B ===
In: Note: Flags indicate national team as defined under FIFA eligibility rules; some limited exceptions apply. Players may hold more than one non-FIFA nationality.

No.	Pos.	Nation	Player
—	FW	SVK	Vladimír Trabalík (from MŠK Žilina)

Out: Note: Flags indicate national team as defined under FIFA eligibility rules; some limited exceptions apply. Players may hold more than one non-FIFA nationality.

No.	Pos.	Nation	Player
—	DF	SVK	Richard Pečarka (loan return to MŠK Námestovo)
—	MF	SVK	Filip Mráz (on loan to FK Pohronie)
—	FW	SRB	Boris Krstić (to MŠK Žilina)
—	DF	CMR	James Ndjeungoue (to MŠK Žilina)
—	FW	CMR	Loic Essomba (to MŠK Žilina)

=== FK Slavoj Trebišov ===
In: Note: Flags indicate national team as defined under FIFA eligibility rules; some limited exceptions apply. Players may hold more than one non-FIFA nationality.

No.	Pos.	Nation	Player
―	DF	SVK	Jakub Sova (on loan from MFK Zemplín Michalovce)
―	MF	UKR	Yevgeniy Kovalenko (on loan from MFK Spartak Medzev)
―	DF	UKR	Danylo Sydorenko (on loan from MFK Spartak Medzev)
—	FW	SVK	Boris Gáll (on loan from FC Košice)

Out: Note: Flags indicate national team as defined under FIFA eligibility rules; some limited exceptions apply. Players may hold more than one non-FIFA nationality.

No.	Pos.	Nation	Player
―	FW	NGA	Kenneth Ikugar (loan return to FC Spartak Trnava)
―	FW	NGA	Ridwan Sanusi (loan return to ŠKF Sereď)
―	MF	HUN	Balázs Zsemlye (loan return to (Hungary) Diósgyőri VTK)

=== FK Dubnica ===
In: Note: Flags indicate national team as defined under FIFA eligibility rules; some limited exceptions apply. Players may hold more than one non-FIFA nationality.

No.	Pos.	Nation	Player

Out: Note: Flags indicate national team as defined under FIFA eligibility rules; some limited exceptions apply. Players may hold more than one non-FIFA nationality.

No.	Pos.	Nation	Player
—	DF	SVK	Róbert Štefánek (to Spartak Myjava)
—	FW	MNE	Miladin Vujošević (Released)

=== MŠK Púchov ===
In: Note: Flags indicate national team as defined under FIFA eligibility rules; some limited exceptions apply. Players may hold more than one non-FIFA nationality.

No.	Pos.	Nation	Player
—	FW	SVK	Lukáš Letenay (on loan from AS Trenčín)
—	MF	CZE	Radim Pobořil (from (Czech Republic) TJ Valašské Meziříčí)

Out: Note: Flags indicate national team as defined under FIFA eligibility rules; some limited exceptions apply. Players may hold more than one non-FIFA nationality.

No.	Pos.	Nation	Player

=== FK Rača ===
In: Note: Flags indicate national team as defined under FIFA eligibility rules; some limited exceptions apply. Players may hold more than one non-FIFA nationality.

No.	Pos.	Nation	Player
—	MF	CZE	Martin Petr (on loan from MFK Skalica)
—	DF	SVK	Martin Klabník (on loan from FK Pohronie)
—	MF	SVK	Sven Jurčišin (on loan from FK Poprad)

Out: Note: Flags indicate national team as defined under FIFA eligibility rules; some limited exceptions apply. Players may hold more than one non-FIFA nationality.

No.	Pos.	Nation	Player
—	MF	SVK	Matej Palacka (to (Austria) SK Wullersdorf)
—	DF	SVK	Martin Mitrík (to (Austria) ASK Neutal)
—	MF	SVK	Miroslav Antal (to KFC Komárno)

=== MŠK Považská Bystrica ===
In: Note: Flags indicate national team as defined under FIFA eligibility rules; some limited exceptions apply. Players may hold more than one non-FIFA nationality.

No.	Pos.	Nation	Player
—	FW	SVK	Dávid Guba (on loan from FC Košice)
—	DF	SVK	Richard Pečarka (on loan from MŠK Námestovo)
—	MF	SVK	Peter Ďungel (on loan from MFK Tatran Liptovský Mikuláš)
—	GK	SVK	Marek Teplan (on loan from MŠK Žilina)
—	DF	SVK	Mário Mihál (on loan from FC Spartak Trnava)

Out: Note: Flags indicate national team as defined under FIFA eligibility rules; some limited exceptions apply. Players may hold more than one non-FIFA nationality.

No.	Pos.	Nation	Player
—	GK	SVK	Matej Slávik (on loan to MŠK Žilina)

=== MFK Dolný Kubín ===
In: Note: Flags indicate national team as defined under FIFA eligibility rules; some limited exceptions apply. Players may hold more than one non-FIFA nationality.

No.	Pos.	Nation	Player
—	DF	SVK	Jakub Luka (on loan from MFK Ružomberok)
—	MF	SVK	Ivan Straka (on loan from FK Pohronie)
—	GK	SVK	Matej Vajs (on loan from MFK Zemplín Michalovce)
—	DF	SVK	Lukáš Bielák (on loan from MFK Tatran Liptovský Mikuláš)

Out: Note: Flags indicate national team as defined under FIFA eligibility rules; some limited exceptions apply. Players may hold more than one non-FIFA nationality.

No.	Pos.	Nation	Player
—	FW	BEL	Ben Kifoumbi (to (Germany) TuS Bövinghausen)

=== 1. FC Tatran Prešov ===
In: Note: Flags indicate national team as defined under FIFA eligibility rules; some limited exceptions apply. Players may hold more than one non-FIFA nationality.

No.	Pos.	Nation	Player
—	DF	SVK	Richard Nagy (on loan from MŠK Žilina)
―	FW	POL	Dominik Sokół (on loan from (Poland) Radomiak Radom)
―	GK	UKR	Ivan Tyurin (from (France) GFA Rumilly-Vallières)
―	MF	POR	Tiago Matos (on loan from (Poland) Radomiak Radom)

Out: Note: Flags indicate national team as defined under FIFA eligibility rules; some limited exceptions apply. Players may hold more than one non-FIFA nationality.

No.	Pos.	Nation	Player
―	MF	GRE	Antonis Gaitanidis (Released)

=== Spartak Myjava ===
In: Note: Flags indicate national team as defined under FIFA eligibility rules; some limited exceptions apply. Players may hold more than one non-FIFA nationality.

No.	Pos.	Nation	Player
—	DF	SVK	Michal Boledovič (from FC Spartak Trnava)
—	FW	SVK	Filip Škrteľ (on loan from FC Baník Prievidza)
—	DF	SVK	Róbert Štefánek (from FK Dubnica)

Out: Note: Flags indicate national team as defined under FIFA eligibility rules; some limited exceptions apply. Players may hold more than one non-FIFA nationality.

No.	Pos.	Nation	Player
—	DF	BRA	Willian Correia Silva (to (India) RANS Nusantara F.C.)
—	MF	SVK	Jakub Buchel (on loan to FK Inter Bratislava)

=== ŠK Slovan Bratislava B ===
In: Note: Flags indicate national team as defined under FIFA eligibility rules; some limited exceptions apply. Players may hold more than one non-FIFA nationality.

No.	Pos.	Nation	Player
—	DF	SVK	Daniel Szalma (on loan from FC DAC 1904 Dunajská Streda)

Out: Note: Flags indicate national team as defined under FIFA eligibility rules; some limited exceptions apply. Players may hold more than one non-FIFA nationality.

No.	Pos.	Nation	Player
