= List of Slovak football transfers summer 2024 =

Notable Slovak football transfers in the summer transfer window 2024 by club. Only transfers of the Nike Liga and 2. liga are included.

== Nike Liga ==
=== ŠK Slovan Bratislava ===
In: Note: Flags indicate national team as defined under FIFA eligibility rules; some limited exceptions apply. Players may hold more than one non-FIFA nationality.

| No. | Pos. | Nation | Player |
|---|---|---|---|
| 24 | MF | CRO | Marko Tolić (from (Croatia) GNK Dinamo Zagreb) |
| 13 | FW | SVK | David Strelec (from (Italy) Spezia Calcio) |
| — | MF | SVK | Róbert Mak (from Free agent) |
| 37 | MF | SVK | Július Szöke (from (Cyprus) Aris Limassol FC) |
| — | DF | CZE | Jurij Medveděv (from (Russia) PFC Sochi) |
| — | DF | BEL | Siemen Voet (loan return from (Netherlands) Fortuna Sittard) |
| — | FW | SUI | Adler Da Silva (loan return from (Poland) Stal Rzeszów) |
| — | GK | SVK | Dominik Takáč (from Free agent). |
| — | MF | BIH | Alen Mustafić (from Free agent). |
| 93 | FW | TOG | Idjessi Metsoko (on loan from (Czech Republic) Viktoria Plzeň) |
| 77 | MF | UKR | Danylo Ihnatenko (from (France) FC Girondins de Bordeaux) |
| 26 | MF | SVK | Artur Gajdoš (from AS Trenčín) |

Out: Note: Flags indicate national team as defined under FIFA eligibility rules; some limited exceptions apply. Players may hold more than one non-FIFA nationality.

| No. | Pos. | Nation | Player |
|---|---|---|---|
| 82 | GK | CAN | Milan Borjan (loan return to (Serbia) Red Star Belgrade) |
| 44 | DF | GRE | Spyros Risvanis (Released) |
| — | DF | SVK | Richard Križan (Released and joined SK Dynamo České Budějovice) |
| — | MF | GEO | Jaba Kankava (Released) |
| — | DF | CZE | Jaromír Zmrhal (to (Cyprus) Apollon Limassol) |

=== FC DAC 1904 Dunajská Streda ===
In: Note: Flags indicate national team as defined under FIFA eligibility rules; some limited exceptions apply. Players may hold more than one non-FIFA nationality.

| No. | Pos. | Nation | Player |
|---|---|---|---|
| — | MF | HUN | Máté Tuboly (from (Hungary) Győri ETO FC) |
| — | FW | HUN | Norbert Balogh (loan return from (Hungary) Kisvárda) |
| — | FW | HUN | Ákos Szendrei (loan return from (Hungary) Kecskemét) |
| — | FW | GRE | Giannis Niarchos (loan return from MFK Zemplín Michalovce) |
| — | FW | SVK | Ladislav Almási (on loan from (Czech Republic) FC Baník Ostrava) |
| — | MF | SVK | Ján Bernát (on loan from (Belgium) Westerlo) |
| — | MF | GAM | Mahmudu Bajo (from FK Železiarne Podbrezová) |
| — | MF | HUN | Levente Bősze (from DAC Dunajská Streda U19) |
| — | GK | GRE | Vasilios Kaltsas (from DAC Dunajská Streda U19) |

Out: Note: Flags indicate national team as defined under FIFA eligibility rules; some limited exceptions apply. Players may hold more than one non-FIFA nationality.

| No. | Pos. | Nation | Player |
|---|---|---|---|
| 5 | MF | SEN | Pape Cheikh Diop (Released and joined (United Arab Emirates) Al-Arabi SC (UAE)) |
| 19 | FW | CIV | Fernand Gouré (loan return to (Belgium) Westerlo) |
| 28 | FW | SEN | Moussa Koné (loan return to (Austria) LASK ) |
| 22 | FW | GHA | Brian Oddei (Released) |
| — | MF | CZE | Aleš Čermák (to (Czech Republic) Bohemians 1905) |
| — | MF | UKR | Ihor Kharatin (to (Ukraine) FC Kolos Kovalivka) |
| — | MF | SVK | Dominik Veselovský (to MFK Dukla Banská Bystrica) |
| — | MF | ROU | Márk Kovács (on loan to (Romania) FK Csíkszereda Miercurea Ciuc) |
| — | MF | SRB | Željko Gavrić (on loan to (Hungary) Győri ETO FC) |
| — | FW | GRE | Giannis Niarchos (on loan to FC Košice) |
| — | MF | SVK | Miroslav Káčer (to MŠK Žilina) |

=== FC Spartak Trnava ===
In: Note: Flags indicate national team as defined under FIFA eligibility rules; some limited exceptions apply. Players may hold more than one non-FIFA nationality.

| No. | Pos. | Nation | Player |
|---|---|---|---|
| — | GK | SVN | Žiga Frelih (from MFK Zemplín Michalovce) |
| — | DF | CZE | Libor Holík (from (Czech Republic) FC Viktoria Plzeň) |
| — | DF | CZE | Filip Twardzik (from (Austria) LASK) |
| — | DF | CYP | Thomas Nikolaou (from (Cyprus) Ethnikos Achna FC) |
| — | DF | CRO | Roko Jureškin (from (Moldova) FC Sheriff Tiraspol) |
| — | MF | CZE | Vojtěch Kubista (from (Czech Republic) FK Mladá Boleslav) |
| — | MF | NED | Milan Corryn (from (Netherlands) Almere City FC) |
| — | MF | CZE | Miloš Kratochvíl (from (Czech Republic) FK Jablonec) |
| — | MF | SWE | Hugo Ahl (from FK Humenné) |
| — | MF | SVK | Róbert Pich (from (Cyprus) Othellos Athienou FC) |
| — | MF | SVK | Erik Sabo (from Free agent) |

Out: Note: Flags indicate national team as defined under FIFA eligibility rules; some limited exceptions apply. Players may hold more than one non-FIFA nationality.

| No. | Pos. | Nation | Player |
|---|---|---|---|
| — | GK | SVK | Dominik Takáč (End of contract and joined ŠK Slovan Bratislava) |
| — | GK | SVK | Ľuboš Kamenár (End of contract and joined TJ Slavoj Boleráz) |
| — | DF | SRB | Andrej Đurić (loan return to (Serbia) Red Star Belgrade) |
| — | DF | SVK | Kristián Koštrna (End of contract and joined FK Železiarne Podbrezová) |
| — | DF | SVN | Miha Kompan Breznik (on loan to (Slovenia) NK Radomlje) |
| — | DF | SVK | Sebastian Kóša (to (Spain) Real Zaragoza) |
| — | MF | SVK | Samuel Štefánik (End of contract and joined FK Železiarne Podbrezová) |
| — | MF | CRO | Tomislav Krizmanić (Released and joined NK Croatia Zmijavci) |
| — | MF | NGA | Azeez Oseni (Released and joined (Bosnia and Herzegovina) FK Leotar) |
| — | MF | SVK | Ján Bernát (loan return to (Belgium) K.V.C. Westerlo) |
| — | MF | SWE | Jaheem Burke (Released and joined (Sweden) Utsiktens BK) |
| — | MF | SRB | Filip Bainović (to (Greece) OFI) |
| — | FW | CZE | Tomáš Poznar (End of contract and joined (Czech Republic) Zlín) |
| — | FW | AUT | Marco Djuricin (loan return to (Croatia) HNK Rijeka) |

=== MŠK Žilina ===
In: Note: Flags indicate national team as defined under FIFA eligibility rules; some limited exceptions apply. Players may hold more than one non-FIFA nationality.

| No. | Pos. | Nation | Player |
|---|---|---|---|
| — | DF | UKR | Nikita Kelembet (on loan from FC Petržalka) |
| — | MF | SVK | Dávid Ďuriš (loan return from (Italy) Ascoli Calcio 1898 FC) |
| — | FW | SVK | Adrián Kaprálik (loan return from (Poland) Górnik Zabrze) |
| — | DF | SVK | Adam Kopas (loan return from (Cyprus) Othellos Athienou FC) |
| — | GK | SVK | Marek Teplan (loan return from MŠK Považská Bystrica) |
| — | MF | SVK | Miroslav Káčer (from FC DAC 1904 Dunajská Streda) |
| — | FW | CZE | Denis Alijagić (from (Czech Republic) FC Zbrojovka Brno) |
| TBA | DF | SVK | Peter Pekarík (from Free agent) |

Out: Note: Flags indicate national team as defined under FIFA eligibility rules; some limited exceptions apply. Players may hold more than one non-FIFA nationality.

| No. | Pos. | Nation | Player |
|---|---|---|---|
| 19 | FW | SVK | Timotej Jambor (to (Romania) FC Rapid București) |
| — | DF | SVK | Adam Kopas (to MFK Skalica) |
| — | GK | SVK | Marek Teplan (on loan to FC Košice) |
| — | MF | FRA | Kelian Nsona (loan return to (Germany) Hertha BSC) |
| 19 | DF | SVK | Dominik Javorček (on loan to (Germany) Holstein Kiel) |

=== MFK Ružomberok ===
In: Note: Flags indicate national team as defined under FIFA eligibility rules; some limited exceptions apply. Players may hold more than one non-FIFA nationality.

| No. | Pos. | Nation | Player |
|---|---|---|---|
| — | DF | CZE | Daniel Köstl (from (Czech Republic) Bohemians 1905) |
| — | DF | SVK | Martin Gomola (from MŠK Žilina B) |
| — | MF | SVK | Rudolf Božik (from Slovan Bratislava B) |
| — | DF | SVK | Matej Madleňák (loan return from (Czech Republic) SK Dynamo České Budějovice) |
| — | FW | SVK | Marko Kelemen (loan return from (Hungary) Szombathelyi Haladás) |
| — | MF | SVK | Máté Szolgai (on loan from FC DAC 1904 Dunajská Streda) |
| — | DF | SVK | Daniel Prekop (from AS Trenčín) |
| — | FW | CZE | David Huf (from (Czech Republic) FK Pardubice) |

Out: Note: Flags indicate national team as defined under FIFA eligibility rules; some limited exceptions apply. Players may hold more than one non-FIFA nationality.

| No. | Pos. | Nation | Player |
|---|---|---|---|
| — | MF | SVK | Marek Zsigmund (to FC Košice (2018)) |
| — | DF | SVK | Juraj Kotula (to (Czech Republic) SK Dynamo České Budějovice) |
| — | MF | SVK | Matej Kochan (Released) |
| — | MF | SVK | Tobias Bujňaček (Released) |
| — | MF | SVK | Adrián Macejko (on loan to MFK Tatran Liptovský Mikuláš) |
| — | DF | SVK | Giuliano Antonio Marek (on loan to MFK Tatran Liptovský Mikuláš) |
| — | MF | SVK | Gabriel Halabrín (on loan to Redfox FC Stará Ľubovňa) |
| — | MF | SVK | Samuel Šefčík (to AS Trenčín) |
| — | GK | SVK | Tomáš Frühwald (to (Czech Republic) Bohemians 1905) |

=== FK Železiarne Podbrezová ===
In: Note: Flags indicate national team as defined under FIFA eligibility rules; some limited exceptions apply. Players may hold more than one non-FIFA nationality.

| No. | Pos. | Nation | Player |
|---|---|---|---|
| — | FW | SVK | David Depetris (from FK Dukla Banská Bystrica) |
| — | FW | CZE | Daniel Smékal (from Free Agent) |
| — | DF | SVK | Kristián Koštrna (from FC Spartak Trnava) |
| — | FW | NGA | Kayode Saliman (from (Bosnia and Herzegovina) FK Zvijezda 09) |
| — | MF | SVK | Samuel Štefánik (from FC Spartak Trnava) |
| — | GK | SVK | Pavol Bajza (from (Czech Republic) FC Hradec Králové) |
| — | FW | SVK | Peter Juritka (from (Czech Republic) FC Zbrojovka Brno) |
| — | MF | CZE | Ondřej Deml (on loan from (Czech Republic) FC Viktoria Plzeň) |

Out: Note: Flags indicate national team as defined under FIFA eligibility rules; some limited exceptions apply. Players may hold more than one non-FIFA nationality.

| No. | Pos. | Nation | Player |
|---|---|---|---|
| 20 | DF | SVK | Peter Kováčik (loan return to (Italy) Como 1907) |
| — | DF | CZE | Christophe Kabongo (loan return to (Belgium) Lommel S.K.) |
| — | MF | SVK | Mikuláš Bakaľa (to (Netherlands) FC Den Bosch) |
| — | MF | SVK | Patrik Blahút (to (Czech Republic) 1. FC Slovácko) |
| — | FW | GHA | Mark Assinor (to (Ukraine) FC LNZ Cherkasy) |
| — | DF | SVK | Marek Bartoš (to (Poland) Motor Lublin) |
| — | MF | GAM | Mahmudu Bajo (to FC DAC 1904 Dunajská Streda) |
| — | MF | SVK | Jozef Špyrka (on loan to KFC Komárno) |
| — | GK | SVK | Ivan Rehák (on loan to MFK Dukla Banská Bystrica) |
| — | MF | UKR | Dmytro Laktionov (Released) |
| — | DF | SVK | Alex Molčan (Released) |
| — | MF | NGA | Lekan Okunola (on loan to FK Humenné) |
| — | DF | SVK | Nicolas Šikula (to MFK Dukla Banská Bystrica) |
| — | DF | SVK | Tobiáš Diviš (on loan to KFC Komárno) |

=== MFK Dukla Banská Bystrica ===
In: Note: Flags indicate national team as defined under FIFA eligibility rules; some limited exceptions apply. Players may hold more than one non-FIFA nationality.

| No. | Pos. | Nation | Player |
|---|---|---|---|
| — | MF | SVK | Matúš Köröš (loan return from MFK Dolný Kubín) |
| — | FW | SVK | Samuel Svetlík (loan return from FC Tatran Prešov) |
| — | GK | SVK | Filip Baláž (loan return from FK Humenné) |
| — | GK | SVK | Ivan Rehák (on loan from FK Železiarne Podbrezová) |
| — | DF | SVK | Nicolas Šikula (from FK Pohronie) |
| — | DF | SVK | Bernard Petrák (from FC Košice) |
| — | FW | SVK | Tomáš Malec (from (Czech Republic) SK Prostějov) |
| — | MF | SVK | Adam Brenkus (from FC ViOn Zlaté Moravce) |
| — | GK | SVK | Michal Trnovský (from FC ŠTK 1914 Šamorín) |
| — | GK | SVK | Michal Lukáč (from FK Železiarne Podbrezová U19) |
| — | MF | SVK | Dominik Veselovský (from FC DAC 1904 Dunajská Streda) |
| — | DF | GHA | Ivan Anokye Mensah (from MŠK Žilina B) |
| — | DF | SVK | Jakub Uhrinčať (from (Czech Republic) Sparta Prague B) |

Out: Note: Flags indicate national team as defined under FIFA eligibility rules; some limited exceptions apply. Players may hold more than one non-FIFA nationality.

| No. | Pos. | Nation | Player |
|---|---|---|---|
| — | FW | SVK | David Depetris (to FK Železiarne Podbrezová) |
| — | FW | SVK | Róbert Polievka (to (Hungary) MTK Budapest FC) |
| — | GK | SVK | Matúš Hruška (to (Czech Republic) FK Dukla Prague) |
| — | FW | BRA | João Guimarães (Released and joined (Thailand) Khon Kaen F.C.) |
| — | FW | BRA | Marquinho (Released) |
| — | MF | SVK | Adrián Káčerík (from (Poland) Chojniczanka Chojnice) |
| — | GK | SVK | Július Nôta (to FK Podkonice) |

=== AS Trenčín ===
In: Note: Flags indicate national team as defined under FIFA eligibility rules; some limited exceptions apply. Players may hold more than one non-FIFA nationality.

| No. | Pos. | Nation | Player |
|---|---|---|---|
| — | DF | SVK | Jakub Holúbek (from (Poland) Piast Gliwice) |
| — | GK | SRB | Andrija Katić (from (Serbia) FK Voždovac) |
| — | DF | SVK | Matej Obšivan (from MŠK Púchov) |
| — | DF | SVK | Šimon Mičuda (loan return from MŠK Púchov) |
| — | MF | SRB | Luka Zorić (from Free agent) |
| — | MF | SVK | Samuel Šefčík (from MFK Ružomberok) |

Out: Note: Flags indicate national team as defined under FIFA eligibility rules; some limited exceptions apply. Players may hold more than one non-FIFA nationality.

| No. | Pos. | Nation | Player |
|---|---|---|---|
| — | GK | SVK | Michal Kukučka (to (Germany) 1. FC Nürnberg) |
| — | DF | SVK | Samuel Kozlovský (to (Poland) Widzew Łódź) |
| 1 | GK | CPV | Vozinha (to (Portugal) G.D. Chaves) |
| — | FW | SVK | Lucas Demitra (to (United States) St. Louis City 2) |
| — | FW | SRB | Njegoš Kupusović (to (Azerbaijan) Sabah FC) |
| — | DF | SVK | Matej Obšivan (on loan to MŠK Púchov) |
| — | DF | SVK | Šimon Mičuda (to (Czech Republic) FC Zbrojovka Brno) |
| — | FW | NGA | Jesse Akila (to (Armenia) FC Van) |
| — | DF | SVK | Roman Šebeň (to FK Beluša) |
| — | FW | NGA | Hilary Gong (to (Poland) Widzew Łódź) |
| — | DF | BIH | Alden Šuvalija (Released) |
| 11 | MF | SVK | Matúš Kmeť (to (United States) Minnesota United FC) |
| — | MF | SVK | Artur Gajdoš (to ŠK Slovan Bratislava) |

=== MFK Skalica ===
In: Note: Flags indicate national team as defined under FIFA eligibility rules; some limited exceptions apply. Players may hold more than one non-FIFA nationality.

| No. | Pos. | Nation | Player |
|---|---|---|---|
| — | DF | BRA | Kauã Moura (loan return from Spartak Myjava) |
| — | FW | CZE | Jakub Kousal (loan return from Spartak Myjava) |
| — | FW | NGA | Taofiq Jibril (from Free agent) |
| — | DF | SVK | Adam Kopas (from MŠK Žilina) |
| — | FW | SVK | Marek Fábry (from Free agent) |
| — | FW | SVK | Lukáš Leginus (from FC ŠTK 1914 Šamorín) |
| — | GK | SVK | Lukáš Hroššo (from Free agent) |
| — | DF | NGA | Sheun Emmanuel (from (Nigeria) Obazz FC) |

Out: Note: Flags indicate national team as defined under FIFA eligibility rules; some limited exceptions apply. Players may hold more than one non-FIFA nationality.

| No. | Pos. | Nation | Player |
|---|---|---|---|
| — | MF | SVK | Denis Baumgartner (to FC ViOn Zlaté Moravce) |
| — | FW | CZE | Jakub Kousal (on loan to Redfox FC Stará Ľubovňa) |
| — | DF | COL | Brayam Palacios (to (Colombia) Atlético Huila) |
| — | GK | CZE | Matěj Luksch (loan return to (Czech Republic) SK Dynamo České Budějovice) |
| — | FW | AUT | Alex Sobczyk (Released) |
| — | FW | CZE | Roman Haša (Released) |
| — | FW | CZE | Daniel Smékal (loan return to (Czech Republic) FC Baník Ostrava and joined FK Železiarne Podbrezová) |

=== MFK Zemplín Michalovce ===
In: Note: Flags indicate national team as defined under FIFA eligibility rules; some limited exceptions apply. Players may hold more than one non-FIFA nationality.

| No. | Pos. | Nation | Player |
|---|---|---|---|
| — | DF | SVK | Jaroslav Holp (loan return from FK Humenné) |
| — | GK | SVK | Patrik Lukáč (from FC ViOn Zlaté Moravce) |
| — | DF | UKR | Denys Taraduda (from (Romania) CSM Ceahlăul Piatra Neamț) |
| — | FW | SVK | Erik Pačinda (from Free agent) |
| — | GK | BIH | Muhamed Šahinović (on loan from (Poland) Raków Częstochowa) |
| — | DF | GUI | Franck Bahi (from FC ŠTK 1914 Šamorín) |

Out: Note: Flags indicate national team as defined under FIFA eligibility rules; some limited exceptions apply. Players may hold more than one non-FIFA nationality.

| No. | Pos. | Nation | Player |
|---|---|---|---|
| — | DF | SVK | Martin Kolesár (Released) |
| — | DF | SVK | Jaroslav Holp (to FC ViOn Zlaté Moravce) |
| — | FW | GRE | Giannis Niarchos (loan return to FC DAC 1904 Dunajská Streda) |
| — | DF | GUI | Franck Bahi (loan return to FC ŠTK 1914 Šamorín) |
| 77 | GK | SVN | Žiga Frelih (to Spartak Trnava) |
| TBA | DF | SVK | Daniel Magda (to FC Košice) |
| — | DF | SVK | Filip Vaško (to (Czech Republic) 1. FC Slovácko) |
| — | MF | SVK | Lukáš Jánošík (to MŠK Považská Bystrica) |
| — | DF | UKR | Vladyslav Veremeev (to (Latvia) FS Jelgava) |

=== FC Košice ===
In: Note: Flags indicate national team as defined under FIFA eligibility rules; some limited exceptions apply. Players may hold more than one non-FIFA nationality.

| No. | Pos. | Nation | Player |
|---|---|---|---|
| — | FW | SEN | Landing Sagna (loan return from (Czech Republic) FC Vysočina Jihlava) |
| — | FW | SVK | Samuel Gladiš (loan return from FC Tatran Prešov) |
| — | DF | SVK | Jakub Jakubko (loan return from FC Petržalka) |
| — | MF | SVK | Marek Zsigmund (from MFK Ružomberok) |
| — | FW | CRO | Karlo Miljanić (from (Croatia) HNK Cibalia) |
| TBA | DF | SVK | Daniel Magda (from MFK Zemplín Michalovce) |
| TBA | MF | SVK | Dalibor Takáč (from Free agent) |
| TBA | GK | SVK | Dávid Šípoš (from (Czech Republic) SK Dynamo České Budějovice) |
| — | FW | GRE | Giannis Niarchos (on loan from FC DAC 1904 Dunajská Streda) |
| — | MF | POR | Luís Santos (from (Portugal) Boavista F.C.) |
| — | GK | SVK | Marek Teplan (on loan from MŠK Žilina) |
| ― | FW | SVK | Timotej Vavrík (from MŠK Púchov) |

Out: Note: Flags indicate national team as defined under FIFA eligibility rules; some limited exceptions apply. Players may hold more than one non-FIFA nationality.

| No. | Pos. | Nation | Player |
|---|---|---|---|
| — | DF | SVK | Bernard Petrák (to MFK Dukla Banská Bystrica) |
| 34 | MF | SVK | Lukáš Greššák (to FC ViOn Zlaté Moravce) |
| — | FW | SEN | Landing Sagna (to FC Tatran Prešov) |
| — | DF | SVK | Ján Mizerák (to (Austria) ASV Hohenau) |
| — | MF | MNE | Deni Hočko (to (Cyprus) Karmiotissa FC) |
| — | DF | CZE | Martin Šindelář (to (Czech Republic) 1. SK Prostějov) |
| — | DF | ALB | Kristi Qose (to (Albania) AF Elbasani) |
| — | FW | SVK | Samuel Gladiš (Released) |
| — | DF | SVK | Samuel Magda (Released) |
| — | MF | SVK | Erik Liener (Released) |
| — | DF | SVK | Michal Jonec (Released) |
| — | DF | PAN | Eric Davis (Released and joined (Brazil) Vila Nova Futebol Clube) |
| — | FW | SVK | Erik Pačinda (Released and joined Michalovce) |
| — | DF | UKR | Oleksandr Holikov (Released) |
| — | FW | MAR | Moha Rharsalla (Released and joined (Hungary) Diósgyőri VTK) |
| — | MF | SVK | František Pavúk (End of professional career) |
| — | FW | FRA | Sidath Sow (Released) |
| — | FW | SVK | Matúš Smieško (Released) |
| — | DF | SVK | Jakub Forgáč (Released) |
| — | DF | GAB | Moussango Obounet (loan return to (Hungary) Diósgyőri VTK) |
| — | GK | POR | Cristiano (Released) |
| — | GK | SVK | Frederik Valach (Released) |
| — | MF | SVK | Miroslav Sovič (on loan to FC Tatran Prešov) |

=== KFC Komárno ===
In: Note: Flags indicate national team as defined under FIFA eligibility rules; some limited exceptions apply. Players may hold more than one non-FIFA nationality.

| No. | Pos. | Nation | Player |
|---|---|---|---|
| — | MF | SVK | Boris Druga (loan return from FK Slavoj Trebišov) |
| — | DF | SVK | Róbert Pillár (from (Hungary) Mezőkövesdi SE) |
| — | DF | SVK | Tobiáš Diviš (from MFK Tatran Liptovský Mikuláš) |
| — | MF | HUN | Gergő Nagy (from (Hungary) Mezőkövesdi SE) |
| — | MF | ROU | Nándor Tamás (from (Hungary) Puskás Akadémia FC) |
| — | DF | CZE | Ondřej Rudzan (from (Czech Republic) 1. SK Prostějov) |
| — | GK | SVK | Matúš Chropovský (from FC ViOn Zlaté Moravce) |
| — | GK | CZE | Jakub Trefil (on loan from (Czech Republic) SK Sigma Olomouc) |
| — | MF | SVK | Viktor Sliacky (on loan from FC Petržalka) |
| — | MF | SVK | Jozef Špyrka (on loan from FK Železiarne Podbrezová) |
| — | MF | SVK | Viktor Sliacky (on loan from FC Petržalka) |

Out: Note: Flags indicate national team as defined under FIFA eligibility rules; some limited exceptions apply. Players may hold more than one non-FIFA nationality.

| No. | Pos. | Nation | Player |
|---|---|---|---|
| — | MF | SVK | Boris Druga (on loan to OFK Malženice) |
| — | MF | SVK | Martin Adamec (to (Estonia) FC Nõmme United) |
| — | GK | SVK | Miloslav Bréda (to FK Humenné) |
| — | MF | SVK | Miroslav Antal (to (Austria) ASK Neutal) |
| — | DF | HUN | Patrik Eckl (loan return to (Hungary) Újpest FC) |
| — | MF | SVK | Ferenc Bögi (Released) |
| — | DF | HUN | Ádám Baranyai (Released) |
| — | GK | HUN | László Laky (Released) |
| — | FW | HUN | Péter Puska (loan return to (Hungary) Vasas Kubala Akadémia under-19) |
| — | MF | MNE | Nikola Janjić (loan return to (Croatia) NK Osijek) |
| — | DF | SVK | Samuel Magda (loan return to FC Košice) |
| — | DF | SVK | Dávid Ovšonka (loan return to FK Pohronie) |

== 2. liga ==
=== FC ViOn Zlaté Moravce ===
In: Note: Flags indicate national team as defined under FIFA eligibility rules; some limited exceptions apply. Players may hold more than one non-FIFA nationality.

| No. | Pos. | Nation | Player |
|---|---|---|---|
| — | MF | SVK | Lukáš Greššák (from FC Košice) |
| — | MF | SVK | Denis Baumgartner (from MFK Skalica) |
| — | DF | CZE | Matěj Helebrand (from (Czech Republic) SFC Opava) |
| — | GK | SVK | Matej Vajs (from MFK Tatran Liptovský Mikuláš) |
| — | DF | CZE | Jan Kadlec (from (Czech Republic) SFC Opava) |
| — | MF | GEO | Levan Nonikashvili (from (Georgia (country)) FC Iberia 1999) |
| — | MF | SVK | Maximilián Halo (from FC Petržalka) |
| — | MF | SVK | Denis Baumgartner (from MFK Skalica) |
| — | DF | SVK | Jaroslav Holp (from MFK Zemplín Michalovce) |
| — | DF | SVK | Robert Stareček (loan return from ŠKF Sereď) |

Out: Note: Flags indicate national team as defined under FIFA eligibility rules; some limited exceptions apply. Players may hold more than one non-FIFA nationality.

| No. | Pos. | Nation | Player |
|---|---|---|---|
| — | DF | SVK | Matúš Čonka (to TJ Slavoj Boleráz) |
| — | MF | SVK | Adam Brenkus (to MFK Dukla Banská Bystrica) |
| — | GK | SVK | Matúš Chropovský (to KFC Komárno) |
| — | GK | SVK | Patrik Lukáč (to MFK Zemplín Michalovce) |
| — | DF | SVK | Matej Moško (to MŠK Púchov) |
| — | FW | SVK | Marek Švec (to FC Petržalka) |
| — | DF | SVK | Richard Nagy (to (Serbia) FK Jedinstvo Ub) |
| — | MF | SVK | Patrik Dulay (to (Czech Republic) FC Slovan Liberec) |
| — | MF | SVK | Tomáš Ďubek (to ViOn Zlaté Moravce B) |
| — | MF | CRO | Andrija Balić (Released and joined (Italy) SSD Chieti FC 1922) |
| — | MF | SVK | Karol Mészáros (Released) |
| — | DF | FRA | Soufiane Dramé (loan return to (Czech Republic) FK Teplice) |
| — | MF | SVK | Jakub Švec (loan return to (Czech Republic) SK Dynamo České Budějovice and joined (Poland) Stal Stalowa Wola) |
| — | FW | SVK | Sebastián Rák (to MFK Zvolen) |
| — | DF | SVK | Vladimír Majdan (Released) |

=== FC Petržalka ===
In: Note: Flags indicate national team as defined under FIFA eligibility rules; some limited exceptions apply. Players may hold more than one non-FIFA nationality.

| No. | Pos. | Nation | Player |
|---|---|---|---|
| — | MF | SVK | Peter Mazan (from FK Pohronie) |
| — | FW | SVK | Marek Švec (from FC ViOn Zlaté Moravce) |
| — | FW | SVK | Daniel Pavúk (from FC Tatran Prešov) |
| — | MF | SVK | Viktor Sliacky (loan return from (Czech Republic) SK Dynamo České Budějovice) |
| — | MF | ENG | Dave Djalme Assuncao (loan return from ŠKF Sereď) |
| — | DF | SRB | Dominik Dinga (from (Belarus) FC Naftan Novopolotsk) |

Out: Note: Flags indicate national team as defined under FIFA eligibility rules; some limited exceptions apply. Players may hold more than one non-FIFA nationality.

| No. | Pos. | Nation | Player |
|---|---|---|---|
| — | DF | UKR | Nikita Kelembet (on loan to MŠK Žilina) |
| — | MF | ENG | Dave Djalme Assuncao (to (England) Avia Świdnik) |
| — | MF | SVK | Viktor Sliacky (on loan to KFC Komárno) |
| — | DF | SVK | Jakub Jakubko (loan return to FC Košice) |
| — | MF | SVK | Erik Liener (loan return to FC Košice) |
| — | MF | SVK | Maximilián Halo (to FC ViOn Zlaté Moravce) |
| — | FW | BIH | Haris Harba (to (Austria) SV Friedburg) |
| — | MF | SVK | Samuel Urgela (to MFK Zvolen) |
| — | DF | NGA | David Ogaga (Released) |

=== FC Tatran Prešov ===
In: Note: Flags indicate national team as defined under FIFA eligibility rules; some limited exceptions apply. Players may hold more than one non-FIFA nationality.

| No. | Pos. | Nation | Player |
|---|---|---|---|
| — | FW | SEN | Landing Sagna (from FC Košice) |
| — | DF | ARM | Abov Avetisyan (from FK Humenné) |
| — | GK | SVK | Adrián Knurovský (from FK Humenné) |
| — | MF | ESP | Óscar Castellano (from Spartak Myjava) |
| — | FW | NGA | David Fadairo (from (Nigeria) Lagos Islanders) |
| — | DF | SVK | Ervín Matta (from FC Košice) |
| — | MF | SVK | Dominík Veselý (on loan from FC Košice) |
| — | MF | SVK | Denis Potoma (from (Poland) Sandecja Nowy Sącz) |
| — | FW | SVK | Matej Franko (on loan from (Czech Republic) MFK Karviná) |
| — | MF | SVK | Samuel Gladiš (from FC Košice) |
| — | DF | SVK | Jozef Menich (from (Georgia (country)) FC Telavi) |
| — | FW | SVK | Stanislav Olejník (from FC ŠTK 1914 Šamorín) |
| ― | MF | SVK | Miroslav Sovič (on loan from FC Košice) |

Out: Note: Flags indicate national team as defined under FIFA eligibility rules; some limited exceptions apply. Players may hold more than one non-FIFA nationality.

| No. | Pos. | Nation | Player |
|---|---|---|---|
| — | GK | UKR | Maksym Kuchynskyi (to MFK Tatran Liptovský Mikuláš) |
| — | DF | SVK | Martin Baran (to FK Slovan Kendice) |
| — | MF | SVK | Dávid Keresteš (to MŠK Tesla Stropkov) |
| — | FW | SVK | Daniel Pavúk (to FC Petržalka) |
| — | FW | SVK | Jozef Dolný (to (Romania) FK Csíkszereda Miercurea Ciuc) |
| — | MF | SRB | Marko Milunović (Released) |
| — | MF | SVK | Jozef Špyrka (loan return to FK Železiarne Podbrezová) |
| — | DF | SVK | Samuel Kopásek (loan return to MŠK Žilina) |
| — | MF | SVK | Adrián Káčerík (loan return to MFK Dukla Banská Bystrica) |
| — | GK | SVK | Dušan Dlugoš (loan return to MŠK Tesla Stropkov) |
| — | MF | SVK | Marián Sabolčík (to MFK Vranov nad Topľou) |
| — | DF | SVK | Miroslav Petko (to FC Lokomotíva Košice) |

=== FK Humenné ===
In: Note: Flags indicate national team as defined under FIFA eligibility rules; some limited exceptions apply. Players may hold more than one non-FIFA nationality.

| No. | Pos. | Nation | Player |
|---|---|---|---|
| — | GK | SVK | Niko Páriš (from FTC Fiľakovo) |
| — | MF | SVK | Lukáš Lukčo (from (Czech Republic) 1.SC Znojmo) |
| — | DF | SRB | Mihailo Cmiljanović (from (Bosnia and Herzegovina) FK Leotar) |
| — | MF | SRB | Sreten Cmiljanović (from (Bosnia and Herzegovina) FK Drina Zvornik) |
| — | FW | UKR | Oleksandr Voytyuk (from 1.FK Svidník) |
| — | MF | UKR | Vadym Mashchenko (from (Poland) Karpaty Krosno) |
| — | GK | SVK | Miloslav Bréda (from KFC Komárno) |
| — | FW | NGA | Lekan Okunola (on loan from FK Železiarne Podbrezová) |

Out: Note: Flags indicate national team as defined under FIFA eligibility rules; some limited exceptions apply. Players may hold more than one non-FIFA nationality.

| No. | Pos. | Nation | Player |
|---|---|---|---|
| — | MF | SWE | Hugo Ahl (to FC Spartak Trnava) |
| — | DF | ARM | Abov Avetisyan (to FC Tatran Prešov) |
| — | GK | SVK | Adrián Knurovský (to FC Tatran Prešov) |
| — | FW | SVK | Oliver Reiter (to (Austria) SK Pama) |
| — | GK | SVK | Filip Baláž (loan return to MFK Dukla Banská Bystrica) |
| — | DF | NED | Justen Kranthove (Released) |
| — | MF | CZE | Libor Bastl (loan return to (Czech Republic) SK Dynamo České Budějovice B) |
| — | DF | SVK | Jaroslav Holp (loan return to MFK Zemplín Michalovce) |
| — | FW | CZE | Matej Franko (loan return to (Czech Republic) MFK Karviná) |

=== MŠK Považská Bystrica ===
In: Note: Flags indicate national team as defined under FIFA eligibility rules; some limited exceptions apply. Players may hold more than one non-FIFA nationality.

| No. | Pos. | Nation | Player |
|---|---|---|---|
| — | MF | SVK | Maroš Čurik (from Spartak Myjava) |
| — | MF | SVK | Lukáš Jánošík (from MFK Zemplín Michalovce) |
| — | FW | SVK | Adam Cisár (from Spartak Myjava) |
| — | FW | SVK | Patrik Jakubík (from MŠK Žilina B) |
| — | FW | SVK | Daniel Rapavý (from OFK Malženice) |

Out: Note: Flags indicate national team as defined under FIFA eligibility rules; some limited exceptions apply. Players may hold more than one non-FIFA nationality.

| No. | Pos. | Nation | Player |
|---|---|---|---|
| — | DF | SVK | Martin Slaninka (to MFK Tatran Liptovský Mikuláš) |
| — | DF | SVK | Richard Pečarka (to MFK Tatran Liptovský Mikuláš) |
| — | GK | SVK | Marek Teplan (loan return to MŠK Žilina) |

=== MFK Tatran Liptovský Mikuláš ===
In: Note: Flags indicate national team as defined under FIFA eligibility rules; some limited exceptions apply. Players may hold more than one non-FIFA nationality.

| No. | Pos. | Nation | Player |

Out: Note: Flags indicate national team as defined under FIFA eligibility rules; some limited exceptions apply. Players may hold more than one non-FIFA nationality.

| No. | Pos. | Nation | Player |

=== MŠK Žilina B ===
In: Note: Flags indicate national team as defined under FIFA eligibility rules; some limited exceptions apply. Players may hold more than one non-FIFA nationality.

| No. | Pos. | Nation | Player |

Out: Note: Flags indicate national team as defined under FIFA eligibility rules; some limited exceptions apply. Players may hold more than one non-FIFA nationality.

| No. | Pos. | Nation | Player |
|---|---|---|---|
| — | DF | SVK | Martin Gomola (to MFK Ružomberok) |

=== FK Pohronie ===
In: Note: Flags indicate national team as defined under FIFA eligibility rules; some limited exceptions apply. Players may hold more than one non-FIFA nationality.

| No. | Pos. | Nation | Player |

Out: Note: Flags indicate national team as defined under FIFA eligibility rules; some limited exceptions apply. Players may hold more than one non-FIFA nationality.

| No. | Pos. | Nation | Player |
|---|---|---|---|
| 10 | MF | SVK | Peter Mazan (to FC Petržalka) |

=== FC ŠTK 1914 Šamorín ===
In: Note: Flags indicate national team as defined under FIFA eligibility rules; some limited exceptions apply. Players may hold more than one non-FIFA nationality.

| No. | Pos. | Nation | Player |

Out: Note: Flags indicate national team as defined under FIFA eligibility rules; some limited exceptions apply. Players may hold more than one non-FIFA nationality.

| No. | Pos. | Nation | Player |

=== ŠK Slovan Bratislava B ===
In: Note: Flags indicate national team as defined under FIFA eligibility rules; some limited exceptions apply. Players may hold more than one non-FIFA nationality.

| No. | Pos. | Nation | Player |

Out: Note: Flags indicate national team as defined under FIFA eligibility rules; some limited exceptions apply. Players may hold more than one non-FIFA nationality.

| No. | Pos. | Nation | Player |
|---|---|---|---|
| — | MF | SVK | Rudolf Božik (to MFK Ružomberok) |

=== MŠK Púchov ===
In: Note: Flags indicate national team as defined under FIFA eligibility rules; some limited exceptions apply. Players may hold more than one non-FIFA nationality.

| No. | Pos. | Nation | Player |

Out: Note: Flags indicate national team as defined under FIFA eligibility rules; some limited exceptions apply. Players may hold more than one non-FIFA nationality.

| No. | Pos. | Nation | Player |
|---|---|---|---|
| ― | FW | SVK | Timotej Vavrík (to FC Košice) |

=== OFK Malženice ===
In: Note: Flags indicate national team as defined under FIFA eligibility rules; some limited exceptions apply. Players may hold more than one non-FIFA nationality.

| No. | Pos. | Nation | Player |

Out: Note: Flags indicate national team as defined under FIFA eligibility rules; some limited exceptions apply. Players may hold more than one non-FIFA nationality.

| No. | Pos. | Nation | Player |
|---|---|---|---|
| — | FW | BRA | Dyjan (to (Czech Republic) 1. FC Slovácko) |

=== MFK Zvolen ===
In: Note: Flags indicate national team as defined under FIFA eligibility rules; some limited exceptions apply. Players may hold more than one non-FIFA nationality.

| No. | Pos. | Nation | Player |

Out: Note: Flags indicate national team as defined under FIFA eligibility rules; some limited exceptions apply. Players may hold more than one non-FIFA nationality.

| No. | Pos. | Nation | Player |

=== Redfox FC Stará Ľubovňa ===
In: Note: Flags indicate national team as defined under FIFA eligibility rules; some limited exceptions apply. Players may hold more than one non-FIFA nationality.

| No. | Pos. | Nation | Player |
|---|---|---|---|
| — | FW | NGA | Abdulhakim Ahmad Daneji (from FK Poprad) |
| — | MF | SVK | Marko Totka (from FK Poprad) |
| — | MF | SVK | Dominik Orság (from FK Poprad) |
| — | DF | COL | Fandenwer González (from MFK Snina) |
| — | MF | CZE | Jakub Kousal (on loan from MFK Skalica) |
| — | MF | SVK | Gabriel Halabrín (on loan from MFK Ružomberok) |

Out: Note: Flags indicate national team as defined under FIFA eligibility rules; some limited exceptions apply. Players may hold more than one non-FIFA nationality.

| No. | Pos. | Nation | Player |
|---|---|---|---|
| — | FW | SVK | Erik Jendrišek (to TJ Družstevník Liptovská Štiavnica) |
| — | DF | SRB | Kristian Močić (to (Tajikistan) Ravshan Kulob) |
| — | FW | SVK | Filip Serečin (to MFK Rožňava) |
| — | GK | SVK | Filip Regitko (to FK Spišská Nová Ves) |
| — | MF | SVK | Samuel Segeda (loan return to FC Košice) |
| — | GK | SVK | Mário Švec (to OFK Raslavice) |
| — | MF | SVK | Patrik Rindoš (to Partizán Bardejov) |
| — | MF | SVK | Matúš Perháč (to Partizán Bardejov) |
| — | DF | SVK | Filip Vojtek (to Partizán Bardejov) |
