= 2024–25 MŠK Žilina season =

MŠK Žilina
2024–25 season
- Manager: Michal Ščasný
- Stadium: Štadión pod Dubňom
- Slovak First Football League: 2nd
colours	colours

The 2024–25 season is the 116th season in the history of MŠK Žilina. During this season the club will be participating in the following competitions: Slovak First Football League, Slovak Cup.

== Players ==
=== Current squad ===
As of 1 January 2025

Note: Flags indicate national team as defined under FIFA eligibility rules; some limited exceptions apply. Players may hold more than one non-FIFA nationality.

No.	Pos.	Nation	Player
1	GK	SVK	Jakub Badžgoň
2	DF	SVK	Peter Pekarík
4	DF	UKR	Nikita Kelembet (on loan from Petržalka)
5	DF	SVK	Tomáš Jaššo
6	MF	CMR	Xavier Adang
7	FW	SVK	František Kóša
8	FW	CMR	Antoin Essomba
10	FW	SVK	Adrián Kaprálik
11	MF	GHA	Samuel Gidi
14	FW	CIV	Eric Bile
15	DF	SVK	Tomáš Hubočan
16	FW	SVK	Patrik Iľko

No.	Pos.	Nation	Player
17	DF	CMR	James Ndjeungoue
19	DF	SVK	Samuel Kopásek
20	DF	SVK	Kristián Bari
21	DF	SVK	Timotej Hranica
22	GK	SVK	Samuel Belaník
23	DF	SVK	Ján Minárik
24	MF	SVK	Samuel Ďatko
28	MF	SVK	Samuel Javorček
29	FW	SVK	Dávid Ďuriš
30	GK	SVK	Ľubomír Belko
37	MF	SVK	Mário Sauer
66	MF	SVK	Miroslav Káčer
TBA	FW	SVK	Timotej Jambor (on loan from Rapid București)
TBA	FW	NGA	Ridwan Sanusi

For recent transfers, see List of Slovak football transfers summer 2024 and
List of Slovak football transfers winter 2024–25.

=== Out on loan ===
Note: Flags indicate national team as defined under FIFA eligibility rules; some limited exceptions apply. Players may hold more than one non-FIFA nationality.

No.	Pos.	Nation	Player
—	GK	SVK	Marek Teplan (at Košice until 31 May 2025)
25	DF	SVK	Tomáš Nemčík (at (Norway) Rosenborg BK until 31 Dec 2024)

No.	Pos.	Nation	Player
27	DF	SVK	Dominik Javorček (at (Germany) Holstein Kiel until 30 June 2025)
3	DF	SVK	Patrik Leitner (at (Czech Republic) MFK Chrudim until 30 June 2025)

=== Friendlies ===
26 June 2024 Friendly	(Czech Republic) Baník Ostrava	1–1	(Slovakia) Žilina	Markvartovice
16:00 CET		Report		Stadium: Fotbalové hřiště Markvartovice

29 June 2024 Friendly	(Hungary) Győri ETO	3–0	(Slovakia) Žilina	Győr
17:00 CET		Report		Stadium: ETO Park

3 July 2024 Friendly	(Slovakia) Žilina	3–0	(Slovakia) FC Košice	Žilina
17:00 CET		Report		Stadium: Futbalové ihrisko v Budatíne

6 July 2024 Friendly	(Czech Republic) Sigma Olomouc	2–0	(Slovakia) Žilina	Slatinice
11:00 CET		Report		Stadium: Hrište Slatinice

13 July 2024 Friendly	(Austria) Ried	3–0	(Slovakia) Žilina	Ulrichsberg
13:00 CET		Report		Stadium: Sportplatz Union Ulrichsberg

13 July 2024 Friendly	(Slovakia) Žilina	1–5	(Czech Republic) Slavia Prague	Ulrichsberg
16:00 CET		Report		Stadium: Sportplatz Union Ulrichsberg

18 July 2024 Friendly	(Hungary) Debreceni VSC	2–1	(Slovakia) Žilina	Enns
18:00 CET		Report		Stadium: Bleicherbach-Arena Enns

7 August 2024 Friendly	(Slovakia) Žilina	1–2	(Cyprus) Apollon	Žilina
16:30 CET		Report		Stadium: Štadión pod Dubňom

11 January 2025 Friendly	(Slovakia) Žilina	2–2	(Slovakia) Tatran Prešov	Žilina
11:30 CET		Report		Stadium: Štadión pod Dubňom

18 January 2025 Friendly	(South Korea) Ulsan HD	1–1	(Slovakia) Žilina	Dubai
16:00	Ko Seung-beom 24'	Report	Jambor 77' (pen.)	Stadium: Jebel Ali Centre of Excellence artificial field

23 January 2025 Friendly	(Latvia) Riga	1–2	(Slovakia) Žilina	Dubai
16:00	Pape Gueye 70'; Černomordijs (yellow card) 77'	Report	Ďuriš 11'; Káčer (yellow card) 39'; Basirou Badjie (yellow card) 70'; Lukáš Prokop 81'	Stadium: Dubai Sports City Football Academy

1 February 2025 Friendly	(Slovakia) Žilina	1–1	(Czech Republic) Zlín	Žilina
13:00 CET	Ďuriš 22'	Report	Poznar 38'	Stadium: Štadión pod Dubňom

=== Slovak First Football League ===
==== League table ====
Pos	Team	Pld	W	D	L	GF	GA	GD	Pts	Qualification
1	Slovan Bratislava	22	15	4	3	48	25	+23	49	Qualification for the championship group
2	Žilina	22	13	6	3	42	20	+22	45	Qualification for the championship group
3	Spartak Trnava	22	12	8	2	34	17	+17	44	Qualification for the championship group
4	DAC Dunajská Streda	22	8	8	6	32	22	+10	32	Qualification for the championship group
5	Podbrezová	22	7	9	6	31	29	+2	30	Qualification for the championship group
6	Košice	22	7	8	7	31	25	+6	29	Qualification for the championship group

Source: Niké liga (in Slovak)
Rules for classification: 1) Points; 2) Head-to-head points; 3) Head-to-head goal difference; 4) Head-to-head away goals scored; 5) Play-off.

Pos	Team	Pld	W	D	L	GF	GA	GD	Pts	Qualification	SLO	ŽIL	TRN	DAC	KOŠ	POD
1	Slovan Bratislava (C, Q)	32	22	6	4	74	39	+35	72	Qualification for the Champions League second qualifying round (Note: Since already qualified Paris Saint-Germain won the Champions League, Slovan Bratislava was promoted to the Champions League second qualifying round as one of the two champions with the highest coefficient in Champions League qualifying.)	—	4–3	1–1	2–2	1–0	3–1
2	Žilina (Q)	32	15	9	8	55	40	+15	54	Qualification for the Conference League second qualifying round	0–5	—	2–1	0–1	0–0	0–0
3	Spartak Trnava (Q)	32	14	10	8	46	34	+12	52	Qualification for the Europa League first qualifying round	2–3	2–4	—	1–1	0–1	2–1
4	DAC Dunajská Streda (O)	32	13	12	7	48	34	+14	51	Qualification for the Conference League play-offs	2–1	3–1	1–0	—	3–2	1–1
5	Košice (Q)	32	11	11	10	45	38	+7	44	Qualification for the Conference League play-offs	2–3	3–2	2–1	2–2	—	1–1
6	Železiarne Podbrezová	32	8	13	11	40	43	−3	37	Qualification for the Conference League play-offs	1–3	1–1	1–2	2–0	0–1	—

Source: Niké liga (in Slovak)
Rules for classification: 1) Points; 2) Head-to-head points; 3) Head-to-head goal difference; 4) Head-to-head away goals scored; 5) Play-off.
(C) Champions; (O) Play-off winners; (Q) Qualified for the phase indicated
Notes:

Pos	Team	Pld	W	D	L	GF	GA	GD	Pts	Qualification or relegation	ZMI	KOM	SKA	RUŽ	TRE	DUK
1	Zemplín Michalovce	32	10	10	12	48	56	−8	40	Qualification for the Conference League play-offs	—	4–5	2–4	2–1	3–2	3–3
2	Komárno	32	11	6	15	36	48	−12	39		0–1	—	1–1	1–2	0–0	2–1
3	Skalica	32	10	8	14	36	45	−9	38		1–0	0–1	—	1–0	1–0	3–1
4	Ružomberok	32	10	6	16	35	50	−15	36		1–0	0–1	3–2	—	1–0	1–2
5	Trenčín (O)	32	7	14	11	37	48	−11	35	Qualification for the relegation play-offs	3–2	1–0	2–0	2–2	—	2–2
6	Dukla Banská Bystrica (R)	32	5	7	20	35	60	−25	22	Relegation to the 2. Liga	2–3	0–1	0–2	0–2	2–3	—

Source: Niké liga (in Slovak)
Rules for classification: 1) Points; 2) Head-to-head points; 3) Head-to-head goal difference; 4) Head-to-head away goals scored; 5) Play-off.
(O) Play-off winners; (R) Relegated

==== Results summary ====
Overall								Home						Away					
Pld	W	D	L	GF	GA	GD	Pts	W	D	L	GF	GA	GD	W	D	L	GF	GA	GD
23	13	7	3	42	20	+22	46	8	3	1	25	13	+12	5	4	2	17	7	+10

Last updated: 8 March 2025.
Source: soccerway

==== Results by round ====
Round	1	2	3	4	5	6	7	8	9	10	11	12	13	14	15	16	17	18	19	20	21	22	23	24	25
Ground	A	H	H	A	H	A	H	A	H	A	H	H	A	A	H	A	H	A	H	A	H	A	H	A	A
Result	D	W	W	D	W	W	W	W	W	W	W	D	L	D	W	W	W	D	L	L	D	W	D		
Position	8	3	2	2	2	2	2	2	2	1	1	2	2	2	2	2	2	2	2	2	2	2	2		

Updated to match(es) played on 8 March 2025. Source: worldfootball
A = Away; H = Home; W = Win; D = Draw; L = Loss

==== Matches ====
27 July 2024 1	Podbrezová	0–0	Žilina	Podbrezová
18:00 CET	Mrva (yellow card) 39'; Koštrna (yellow card) 65'; Vincent Chyla (yellow card) 82'	Report	Ďuriš (yellow card) 46'	Stadium: ZELPO Aréna; Attendance: 1,467; Referee: (Slovakia) Martin Dohál

10 August 2024 3	Žilina	3–1	Zemplín Michalovce	Žilina
18:00 CET	Bile 45+4' (pen.) 65'; Sauer 55'	Report	Bahi (yellow card) 48'; Taraduda 51'; Zubairu (yellow card) 80'	Stadium: Štadión pod Dubňom; Attendance: 1,686; Referee: (Slovakia) Michal Smolak

18 August 2024 4	Spartak Trnava	0–0	Žilina	Trnava
18:00 CET	Kratochvíl (yellow card) 89'	Report	Kopásek (yellow card) 35'; Sauer (yellow card) 44'; Ndjeungoue (yellow card) 68'; Minárik (yellow card) 90+4'	Stadium: City Arena – Anton Malatinsky Stadium; Attendance: 3,919; Referee: (Slovakia) Filip Glova

24 August 2024 5	Žilina	4–1	Trenčín	Žilina
20:30 CET	Timotej Hranica (yellow card) 30'; Gidi 41' (yellow card) 52'; Káčer 60'; Javorček 72'; Alijagić 82'	Report	Stojsavljević (yellow card) 8'; Bariš (yellow card) 15'; Hubočan 25' (o.g.); Gajdoš (yellow card) 34' (red card) 39'; Katić (yellow card) 57'	Stadium: Štadión pod Dubňom; Attendance: 1,939; Referee: (Slovakia) Igor Valent

1 September 2024 6	Slovan Bratislava	0–5	Žilina	Bratislava
15:30 CET	Weiss (yellow card) 80'	Report	Kaprálik 32'; Timotej Hranica 41'; Ďuriš 58'; Sauer 82' 90'	Stadium: Tehelné pole Attendance: 8,119; Referee: (Slovakia) Peter Kráľovič

14 September 2024 7	Žilina	3–2	Skalica	Žilina
18:00 CET	Hubočan (yellow card) 42'; Alijagić 45+4'; Kaprálik 54' 66'; Gidi (yellow card) 69'	Report	Podhorín 43' (pen.); Mášik (yellow card) 45'; Hroššo (yellow card) 70'; Matejov 72'; Krčík (red card) 78'; Černek (yellow card) 90+2'	Stadium: Štadión pod Dubňom; Attendance: 1,399; Referee: (Slovakia) Kristián Micheľ

21 September 2024 8	FC Košice	1–2	Žilina	Košice
18:00 CET	Medved 6'; Niarchos (yellow card) 51'; Takáč (yellow card) 65'	Report	Káčer (yellow card) 30'; Kaprálik (yellow card) 67'; Minárik 84'; Kopásek 90+4'	Stadium: Košická futbalová aréna Attendance: 3,889; Referee: (Slovakia) Bálint Kišš

29 September 2024 9	Žilina	2–1	Komárno	Žilina
18:00 CET	Ďuriš 2'; Ndjeungoue (yellow card) 35'; Kaprálik 62'; Pekarík (yellow card) 68'; Minárik (yellow card) 70'	Report	Patrik Voleský 48'; Pillár (yellow card) 49'; Sluka (yellow card) 75'; Tobiáš Diviš (yellow card) 90+2'	Stadium: Štadión pod Dubňom; Attendance: 2,062; Referee: (Slovakia) Pavel Ochotnický

6 October 2024 10	DAC 1904	0–3	Žilina	Dunajská Streda
18:00 CET	Alex Méndez (yellow card) 51'; Mateus Brunetti (yellow card) 73'	Report	Kaprálik 9'; Minárik 17'; Ndjeungoue (yellow card) 61'; Ďuriš 70'; Kopásek (yellow card) 82'	Stadium: MOL Aréna; Attendance: 4,652; Referee: (Slovakia) Boris Marhefka

20 October 2024 11	Žilina	2–0	Dukla Banská Bystrica	Žilina
15:30 CET	Bile 62'; Bari 69'; Kopásek (yellow card) 77'	Report	Willwéber (yellow card) 35'; Godál (red card) 39'	Stadium: Štadión pod Dubňom; Attendance: 2,330; Referee: (Slovakia) Michal Smolak

26 October 2024 12	Žilina	2–2	Podbrezová	Žilina
15:30 CET	Sauer 31'; Iľko 85'	Report	Daniel Smékal 15'; Depetris 90+2' (yellow card) 90+3'	Stadium: Štadión pod Dubňom; Attendance: 1,982; Referee: (Slovakia) Peter Kráľovič

29 October 2024 2	Žilina	3–1	Ružomberok	Žilina
18:00 CET	Bile 8' (yellow card) 36' (goal) 69'; Kaprálik (yellow card) 37'; Peter Pekarík 48'; Ďuriš (yellow card) 61'	Report	Lavrinčík (yellow card) 37'; Hladík 58'	Stadium: Štadión pod Dubňom; Attendance: 2,572; Referee: (Slovakia) Kristián Micheľ

3 November 2024 13	Ružomberok	1–0	Žilina	Ružomberok
15:30 CET	Malý 45+2'; Selecký (yellow card) 84'	Report	Adama Drame (red card) 6'; Kopásek (yellow card) 56'	Stadium: Štadión pod Čebraťom; Attendance: 1,435; Referee: (Slovakia) Filip Glova

9 November 2024 14	Zemplín Michalovce	1–1	Žilina	Michalovce
15:30 CET	Artúr Musák (yellow card) 15'; Adekunle 54'; Lukáš Šimko (yellow card) 77'; Marcin (yellow card) 90+3'	Report	Bile (yellow card) 34'; Ndjeungoue (yellow card) 39'; Gidi (yellow card) 45+8'; Bari (yellow card) 78'; Kaprálik (yellow card) 78'; Lukas Prokop 81' (yellow card) 85'	Stadium: Mestský futbalový štadión Attendance: 1,384; Referee: (Slovakia) Boris Marhefka

23 November 2024 15	Žilina	3–1	Spartak Trnava	Žilina
18:00 CET	Ujlaky 7' (o.g.); Kaprálik 15'; Sauer 33'; Hubočan (yellow card) 41'; Ndjeungoue (yellow card) 52'; Kopásek (yellow card) 90+1'	Report	Paur 12'; Mikovič (yellow card) 64'; Zeljković (yellow card) 83'	Stadium: Štadión pod Dubňom; Attendance: 2,681; Referee: (Slovakia) Michal Smolak

30 November 2024 16	Trenčín	2–4	Žilina	Trenčín
15:30 CET	Bariš (yellow card) 35'; Lukáš Mikulaj 45'; Holúbek (yellow card) 51'; Stojsavljević 62'; Adrian Fiala (yellow card) 73'	Report	Bile 10' (pen.); Ďuriš 52' 63'; Iľko (yellow card) 57'; Timotej Hranica 65'	Stadium: Štadión Sihoť; Attendance: 1,212; Referee: (Slovakia) Erik Gemzický

7 December 2024 17	Žilina	2–1	Slovan Bratislava	Žilina
18:00 CET	Ndjeungoue (yellow card) 22'; Hubočan (yellow card) 45+2'; Bile 47'; Minárik (yellow card) 90+2'; Bari 90+5'; Sauer (yellow card) 90+5'	Report	Barseghyan (yellow card) 22'; Savvidis (yellow card) 31'; Tolić (yellow card) 37'; Blackman 55'; Ihnatenko (yellow card) 61'	Stadium: Štadión pod Dubňom; Attendance: 5,732; Referee: (Slovakia) Filip Glova

15 December 2024 18	Skalica	0–0	Žilina	Skalica
15:30 CET	Hradecky (yellow card) 62'; Mášik (yellow card) 70'; Černek (yellow card) 73'	Report		Stadium: Mestský štadión Skalica; Attendance: 723; Referee: (Slovakia) Ivan Kružliak

8 February 2025 19	Žilina	0–2	FC Košice	Žilina
18:00 CET	Aleksandre Narimanidze (yellow card) 63'	Report	Niarchos 17' (yellow card) 27'; Jakubko (yellow card) 37'; Miljanić 80' (yellow card) 83'	Stadium: Štadión pod Dubňom; Attendance: 1,575; Referee: (Slovakia) Boris Marhefka

22 February 2025 21	Žilina	1–1	DAC 1904	Žilina
18:00 CET	Ďuriš (yellow card) 52'; Adama Drame (yellow card) 54'; Adang 77'	Report	Mateus Brunetti 50'; Bajo (yellow card) 61'	Stadium: Štadión pod Dubňom; Attendance: 1,260; Referee: (Slovakia) Peter Kráľovič

25 February 2025 20	Komárno	1–0	Žilina	Zlaté Moravce
18:00 CET	Martin Šimko 17'; Tamás (yellow card) 30' (yellow-red card) 47'	Report	Adama Drame (yellow card) 79'; František Kóša (yellow card) 85'	Stadium: ViOn Aréna; Attendance: 328; Referee: (Slovakia) Matej Choreň

1 March 2025 22	Dukla Banská Bystrica	1–2	Žilina	Banská Bystrica
15:30 CET	Willwéber (red card) 57'; Iľko 75' (o.g.); Malec (yellow card) 82'; Godál (yellow card) 86'	Report	Ďuriš 16'; Migaľa 34' (o.g.); Kopásek (yellow card) 50'; Belko (yellow card) 84'	Stadium: Národný Atletický Štadión; Attendance: 964; Referee: (Slovakia) Filip Glova

8 March 2025 23	Žilina	0–0	Podbrezová	Žilina
15:30 CET	Gidi (yellow card) 35'; Bari (yellow card) 47'	Report	Daniel Smékal (yellow card) 51'; Vincent Chyla (yellow card) 74'	Stadium: Štadión pod Dubňom; Attendance: 1,267; Referee: (Slovakia) Martin Dohál

15 March 2025 24	DAC 1904	-	Žilina	Dunajská Streda
18:00 CET				Stadium: DAC Aréna

30 March 2025 25	Spartak Trnava	-	Žilina	Trnava
15:30 CET				Stadium: City Arena – Anton Malatinsky Stadium

=== Slovak Cup ===
28 August 2024 Second Round	Horný Hričov	0–7	Žilina	Horný Hričov
17:00 CET		Report	Alijagić 2' 77'; Bile 29' 33' 44'; Sauer 32'; Dominik Mičúch 78' (o.g.)	Stadium: Pod agátmi Horný Hričov

24 September 2024 Third Round	Námestovo	0–5	Žilina	Námestovo
15:30 CET		Report	Bile 22' 51'; Iľko 41'; Basirou Badjie 83'; Kaprálik 87'	Stadium: Štadión MŠK Námestovo; Attendance: 653

16 October 2024 Fourth Round	Partizán Osrblie	0–8	Žilina	Osrblie
15:00 CET		Report	Iľko 4' 43'; Alijagić 8' 33' 78'; Bile 14'; Gidi 39'; Ďuriš 82'	Stadium: Štadión Osrblie; Attendance: 888; Referee: (Slovakia) Erik Gemzický

6 November 2024 Round of 16	Zemplín Michalovce	1–1 (3–4 p)	Žilina	Michalovce
16:30 CET	Dzotsenidze (yellow card) 29'; Adam Žulevič (yellow card) 38'; Marcin (yellow card) 40'; Bednár (yellow card) 71'; Kyziridis 82'	Report	Ďuriš 51'	Stadium: Mestský futbalový štadión Attendance: 659; Referee: (Slovakia) Erik Gemzický

11 March 2025 Quarter finals	Žilina	0–2	Spartak Trnava	Žilina
18:00 CET	Káčer (yellow card) 73'; Adang (yellow card) 82'	Report	Ďuriš 17' 34'; Štetina (yellow card) 28'; Twardzik (yellow card) 90+4'	Stadium: Štadión pod Dubňom; Attendance: 1,996; Referee: (Slovakia) Michal Smolak
