= Mário Sauer =

Slovak footballer (born 2004)

Personal information
- Date of birth: 15 May 2004 (age 22)
- Place of birth: Bratislava, Slovakia
- Height: 1.80 m (5 ft 11 in)
- Position: Midfielder

Team information
- Current team: 1. FC Kaiserslautern; (on loan from Toulouse)
- Number: 21

Youth career
- –2013: Rača
- 2014–2018: Slovan Bratislava
- 2018–2020: Žilina

Senior career*
Years	Team	Apps	(Gls)
2021–2023	Žilina B	23	(7)
2021–2025	Žilina	87	(14)
2025–	Toulouse	25	(1)
2026–	→ 1. FC Kaiserslautern (loan)	1	(0)

International career^{‡}
	Slovakia U15	9	(3)
	Slovakia U16	8	(0)
	Slovakia U17	2	(0)
	Slovakia U18	5	(1)
2022–2023	Slovakia U19	14	(0)
2022–2023	Slovakia U20	6	(0)
2023–2025	Slovakia U21	22	(5)
2026–	Slovakia	3	(0)
- * Club domestic league appearances and goals as of 30 August 2026 ‡ National team caps and goals as of 5 June 2026

Mário Sauer (born 15 May 2004) is a Slovak professional footballer who plays as a midfielder for 2. Bundesliga club 1. FC Kaiserslautern, on loan from Ligue 1 club Toulouse, and the Slovakia national team.

== Club career ==
=== MŠK Žilina ===
Sauer made his Fortuna Liga debut for Žilina against Spartak Trnava on 16 May 2021. He came on in the second half replacing Vahan Bichakhchyan.

=== Toulouse ===
On 22 May 2025, Sauer signed with Toulouse in France.

On 26 August 2026, Sauer was loaned by 1. FC Kaiserslautern in German 2. Bundesliga.

== International career ==
Sauer played for the Slovakia U-19 side alongside his younger brother, Leo Sauer. Both were selected for the Slovakia U-20 side to compete at the 2023 FIFA U-20 World Cup.

== Career statistics ==
=== Club ===
As of match played 17 May 2026

Appearances and goals by club, season and competition
Club	Season	League			National cup		Europe		Other		Total	
Club	Season	Division	Apps	Goals	Apps	Goals	Apps	Goals	Apps	Goals	Apps	Goals
Žilina B	2020–21	2. Liga	1	0	—		—		—		1	0
Žilina B	2021–22	2. Liga	11	4	—		—		—		11	4
Žilina B	2022–23	2. Liga	11	3	—		—		—		11	3
Žilina B	Total		23	7	—		—		—		23	7
Žilina	2020–21	Slovak First Football League	1	0	0	0	—		—		1	0
Žilina	2021–22	Slovak First Football League	10	1	1	0	—		—		11	1
Žilina	2022–23	Slovak First Football League	15	0	1	1	—		—		16	1
Žilina	2023–24	Slovak First Football League	29	6	1	0	4 (Note: Appearances in UEFA Conference League)	0	—		34	6
Žilina	2024–25	Slovak First Football League	32	7	5	1	—		—		37	8
Žilina	Total		87	14	8	2	4	0	—		99	16
Toulouse	2025–26	Ligue 1	25	1	4	0	—		—		29	1
Career total			135	22	12	2	4	0	0	0	151	24

=== International ===
As of match played 5 June 2026

Appearances and goals by national team and year
National team	Year	Apps	Goals
Slovakia	2026	2	0
Total		2	0
