= Daniel Smékal =

Czech footballer (born 2001)

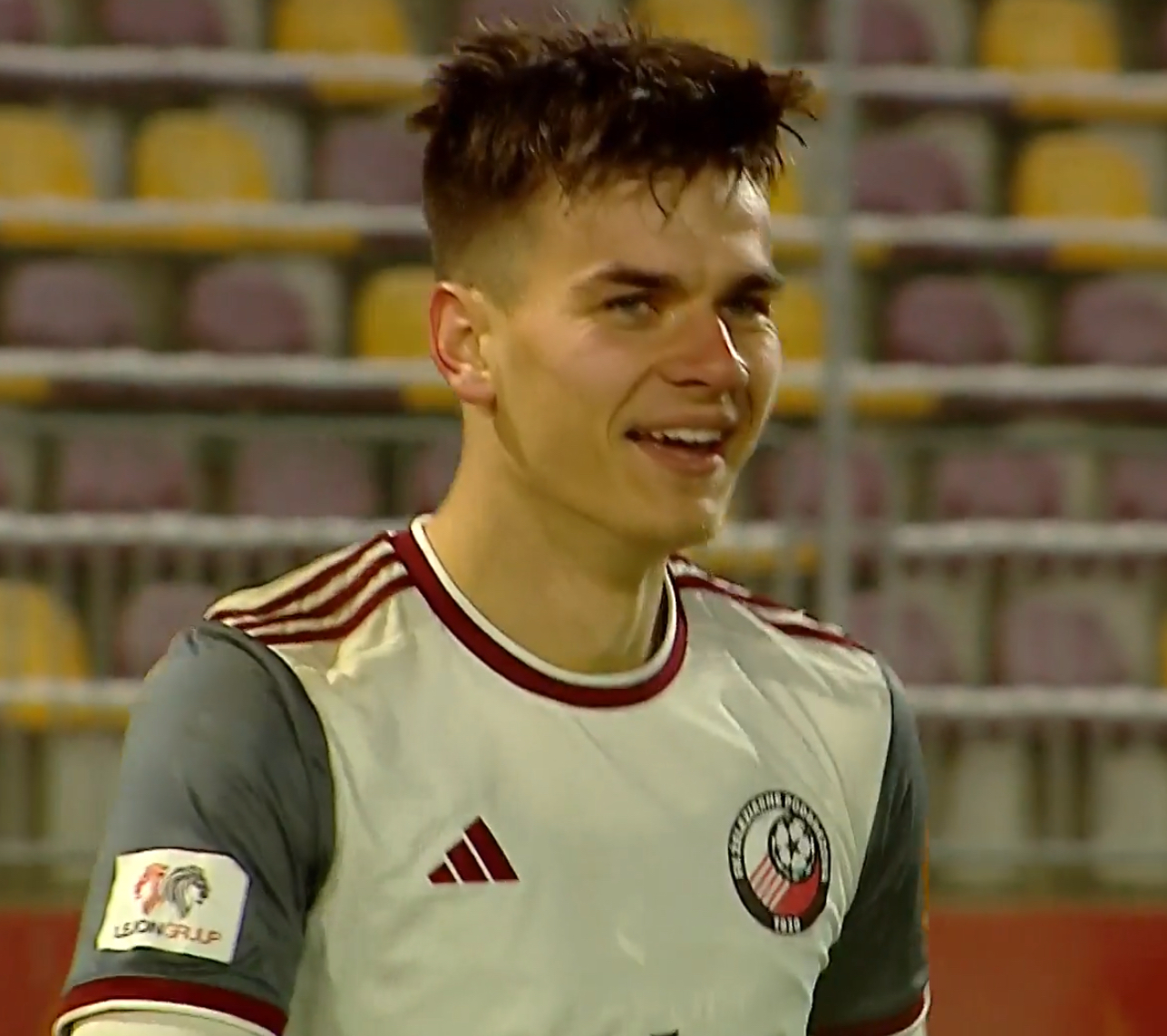
- Smékal in 2024

Personal information
- Full name: Daniel Smékal
- Date of birth: 2 December 2001 (age 24)
- Place of birth: Czech Republic
- Height: 1.93 m (6 ft 4 in)
- Position: Centre forward

Team information
- Current team: Pardubice

Youth career
- ?–2020: Baník Ostrava

Senior career*
Years	Team	Apps	(Gls)
2020	Odra Petřkovice		
2020–2021	Vítkovice		
2021–2024	Baník Ostrava	17	(1)
2023–2024	→ Skalica (loan)	31	(5)
2024–2025	Železiarne Podbrezová	37	(11)
2025–	Pardubice	21	(4)

International career
2021	Czech Republic U20	2	(0)
- * Club domestic league appearances and goals as of 18:06, 29 April 2026 (UTC)

Daniel Smékal (born 2 December 2001) is a Czech professional football player who currently plays for Czech club Pardubice.

== Club career ==
=== Baník Ostrava ===
Smékal is a graduate of the Baník Ostrava youth academy. He made his Czech First League debut in a 2–1 loss against Viktoria Plzeň, coming on as a substitute in the 75th minute of the game. He scored his first goal for Baník in a 2–1 loss against FC Zbrojovka Brno, after a crossed ball by teammate Nemanja Kuzmanovič, Smékal opened the scoring with a close-range header in the 59th minute.

In 2022, he signed a 3 year contract with the club. At his time with Baník he mainly played for the reserve team.

=== MFK Skalica (loan) ===
On 26 July 2023, it was announced that Smékal would be joining Slovak club MFK Skalica on a 1 year loan. He made his debut for Skalica in a league game against Zlaté Moravce, coming on as a substitute in the 62th minute and assisting a goal for Denis Baumgartner. On 29 September 2023, Smékal scored his first goal for the club in a 5–3 loss to MŠK Žilina, scoring in the 50th minute. He also scored in the 1st minute in a 1–1 draw one again against Žilina. At his time at Skalica, he scored 5 goals and provided 2 assists in 31 league games.

=== Železiarne Podbrezová ===
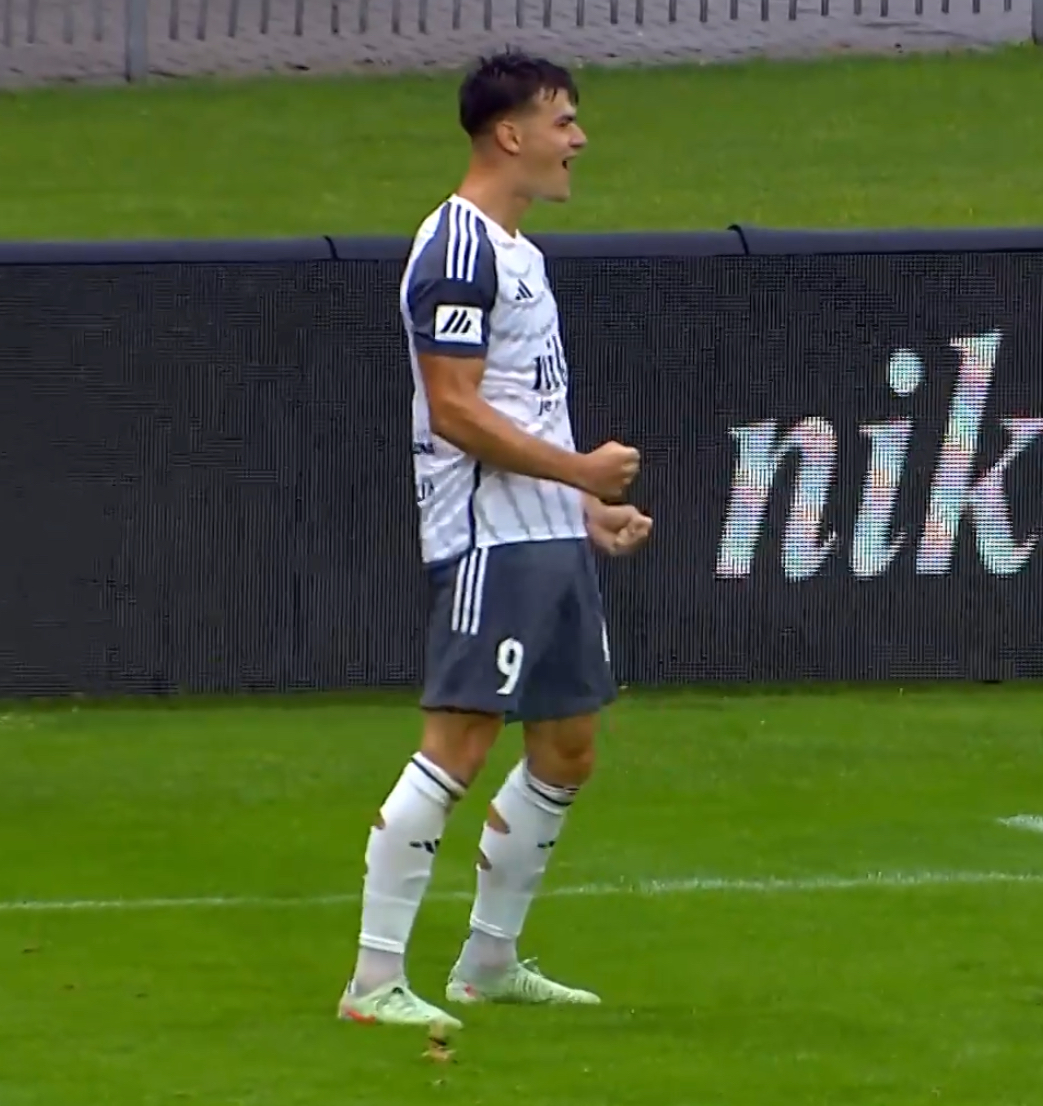
Smékal in 2025.

On 18 June 2024, it was announced by the club that Smékal would be leaving Baník Ostrava for Slovak first league side FK Železiarne Podbrezová, signing a 3 year contract. He made his debut for the club on 27 July 2024, in a 0–0 draw against MŠK Žilina. Smékal scored his first goal for Podbrezova in a 7–1 win over his former club MFK Skalica, coming on as a substitute in the 60th minute.

At his time with Podbrezová, he would score 11 goals and provide 6 assists in 37 league games.

=== Pardubice ===
After being heavily linked with the club, it was announced on 6 September 2025, that Smékal would be returning to the Czech Republic, this time to the Czech First League club FK Pardubice. He made his debut for the club in a 3–2 league loss against FK Jablonec, coming onto the field as a substitute for Filip Vecheta in the 72nd minute.

== International career ==
On 29 September 2021, Smékal was nominated for the Czech Republic U20 team for friendly matches against Romania U20 and England U20.
