= Filip Mráz =

Slovak footballer

Personal information
- Full name: Filip Mráz
- Date of birth: 19 May 2001 (age 25)
- Place of birth: Žilina, Slovakia
- Height: 1.83 m (6 ft 0 in)
- Position: Midfielder

Team information
- Current team: Tatran Liptovský Mikuláš
- Number: 12

Youth career
- 2010–2019: Žilina

Senior career*
Years	Team	Apps	(Gls)
2019–2023	Žilina B	36	(2)
2021–2022	Žilina	21	(0)
2023	→ Pohronie (loan)	8	(0)
2024–	Tatran Liptovský Mikuláš	57	(3)
- * Club domestic league appearances and goals as of 25 May 2026

Filip Mráz (born 19 May 2001) is a Slovak professional footballer who plays for Tatran Liptovský Mikuláš in 2. Liga.

== Club career ==
=== MŠK Žilina ===
Mráz made his Fortuna Liga debut for Žilina during a home fixture against FC ViOn Zlaté Moravce on 22 May 2021. He came on in the second half to replace Miroslav Gono.
