= Martin Petr =

Czech chess grandmaster (born 1988)

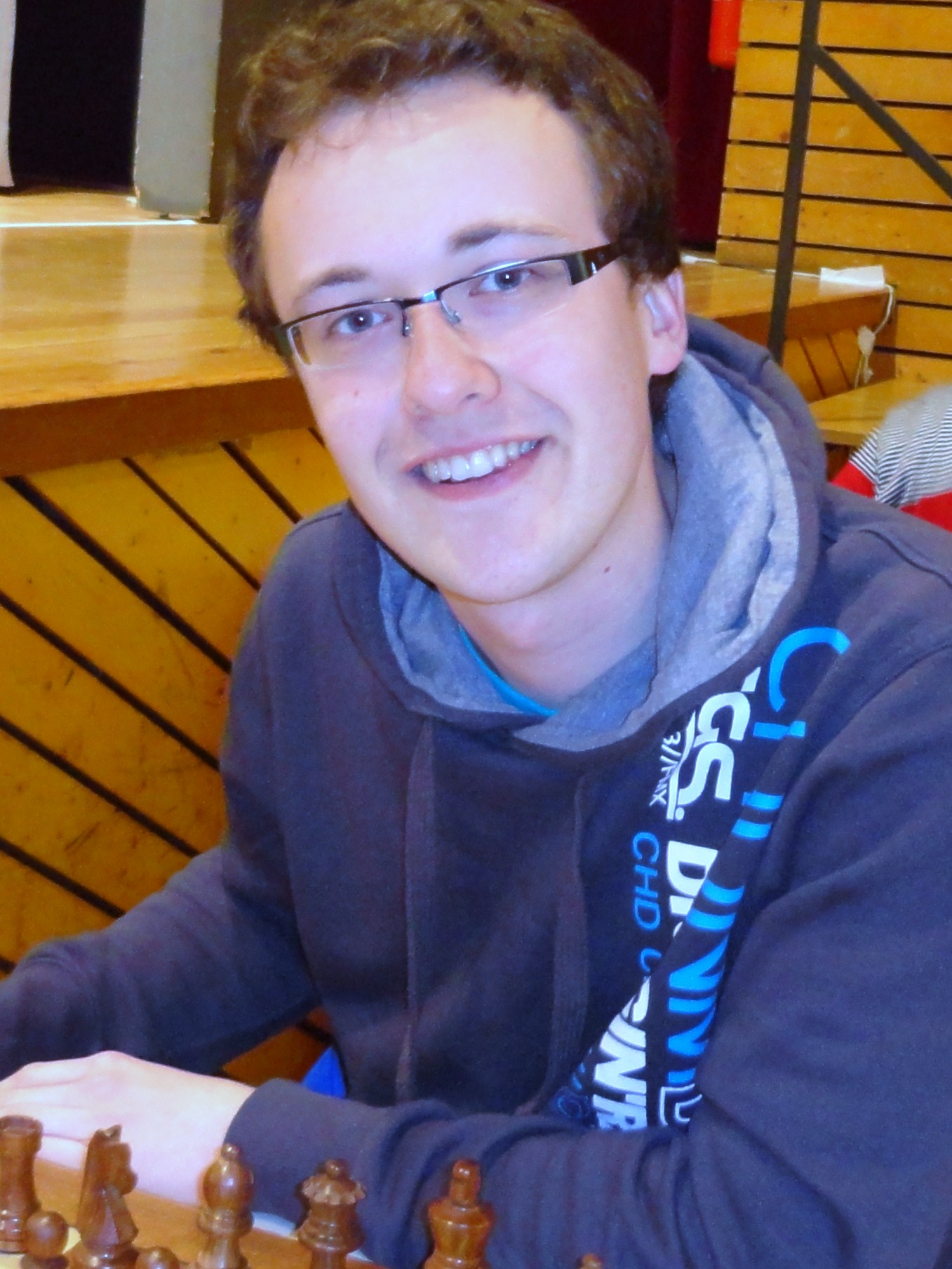
- Petr in 2012

Personal information
- Born: 23 August 1988 (age 37) Broumov, Czechoslovakia

Chess career
- Country: Czech Republic
- Title: Grandmaster (2011)
- FIDE rating: 2467 (July 2026)
- Peak rating: 2542 (June 2014)

Martin Petr (born 23 August 1988) is a Czech chess grandmaster.

== Career ==
He achieved the Grandmaster title in 2011, after earning his norms at the:

- Vasylyshyn Memorial in December 2010
- Rector Cup in February 2011
- Extraliga CR in April 2011

In October 2012, he won the Chess Train Rapid tournament with a perfect score of 13/13.

He is the president of the Czech Chess Federation.
