= Yves Erick Bile =

Ivorian footballer

Personal information
- Date of birth: 24 December 2004 (age 21)
- Place of birth: Attécoubé, Ivory Coast
- Height: 1.81 m (5 ft 11 in)
- Position: Forward

Team information
- Current team: Ludogorets
- Number: 29

Youth career
- –2022: Žilina Africa

Senior career*
Years	Team	Apps	(Gls)
2023–2025	Žilina B	14	(5)
2023–2025	Žilina	42	(10)
2025–	Ludogorets Razgrad	36	(5)
2026–	Ludogorets Razgrad II	8	(5)
- * Club domestic league appearances and goals as of 9 September 2026

Yves Erick Bile (born 24 December 2004) is an Ivorian professional footballer who plays as a forward for Bulgarian First League club Ludogorets Razgrad.

== Club career ==
=== Žilina ===
Bile started playing football at Accra-based MŠK Žilina Africa F.C, an affiliate of Slovak First Football League club MŠK Žilina, and in 2023 was promoted to their European reserve side, and later that year moved to the senior side. Over the course of two seasons, he became one of the best players at the club.

=== Ludogorets Razgrad ===
In February 2025, he and Cameroonian forward James Ndjeungoue successfully pressured the club to sell them abroad by refusing to participate in training sessions. Bile joined Bulgarian side Ludogorets Razgrad for a reported fee of €700,000, signing a three-year contract.
