= Ivan Anokye Mensah =

Ghanaian professional footballer

Ivan Mensah
Personal information
- Full name: Ivan Anokye Mensah
- Date of birth: 22 April 2004 (age 22)
- Place of birth: Ghana
- Height: 1.90 m (6 ft 3 in)
- Position: Centre-back

Team information
- Current team: Spartak Trnava
- Number: 25

Youth career
- –2022: MŠK Žilina Africa

Senior career*
Years	Team	Apps	(Gls)
2018–2022	MŠK Žilina Africa	34	(11)
2021	→ International Allies (loan)	3	(0)
2022–2024	Žilina B	27	(0)
2024	Žilina	0	(0)
2024	→ Dukla Banská Bystrica (loan)	8	(0)
2024–2025	Dukla Banská Bystrica	23	(2)
2025–2026	Sparta Prague	1	(0)
2025–2026	Sparta Prague B	19	(1)
2026–	Spartak Trnava	2	(0)

International career^{‡}
2021	Ghana U20	1	(0)
- * Club domestic league appearances and goals as of 21 November 2026 ‡ National team caps and goals as of 6 March 2021

Ivan Anokye Mensah (born 22 April 2004) is a Ghanaian professional footballer who plays as defender for Slovak side Spartak Trnava.

== Club career ==
Mensah started his professional career with Ghanaian lower-tier side MŠK Žilina Africa FC, a team which plays in the Ghana Division Two League and are affiliated to Slovak side MŠK Žilina. In March 2021, he joined Ghana Premier League side International Allies for the remainder of the 2020–21 season. He made his debut on 4 April 2021, after playing the full 90 minutes in a 1–1 win over Dreams FC.

On 30 May 2025, Mensah signed a multi-year contract with Sparta Prague B.

On 24 June 2026, Mensah signed a contract with Slovak First Football League club Spartak Trnava until 2029.

== International career ==
Mensah is a member of the Ghana national under-20 football team. In 2020–21, he was a member of the team that won the 2020 WAFU U-20 Zone B Tournament and 2021 Africa U-20 Cup of Nations.
