= Jakub Kousal =

Slovak footballer

Personal information
- Full name: Jakub Kousal
- Date of birth: 6 September 2002 (age 24)
- Place of birth: Štěchovice, Czech Republic
- Position: Midfielder

Team information
- Current team: Stará Ľubovňa
- Number: 10

Youth career
- –2017: Sparta Prague
- 2018: Bohemians 1905
- 2018–2021: České Budějovice

Senior career*
Years	Team	Apps	(Gls)
2021–2023	České Budějovice	1	(0)
2021–2023	→ Skalica (loan)	42	(4)
2023–2025	Skalica	9	(0)
2024	→ Spartak Myjava (loan)	12	(2)
2024–2025	→ Stará Ľubovňa (loan)	24	(1)
2025–	Stará Ľubovňa	29	(7)
- * Club domestic league appearances and goals as of 25 May 2026

Jakub Kousal (born 6 September 2002) is a Czech footballer who plays for Stará Ľubovňa as a midfielder.

== Club career ==
=== SK Dynamo České Budějovice ===
Kousal made his Fortuna Liga debut for SK Dynamo České Budějovice against 1. FC Slovácko on 23 May 2021.
