= Vladimír Trabalík =

Slovak footballer

Personal information
- Full name: Vladimír Trabalík
- Date of birth: 2 November 2002 (age 24)
- Place of birth: Trstená, Slovakia
- Height: 1.76 m (5 ft 9 in)
- Position: Forward

Team information
- Current team: Liptovský Mikuláš
- Number: 17

Youth career
- –2018: Oravan Oravská Jasenica
- 2019–2020: Žilina

Senior career*
Years	Team	Apps	(Gls)
2020–2023	Žilina B	52	(6)
2021–2023	Žilina	3	(0)
2023–	Liptovský Mikuláš	29	(3)
- * Club domestic league appearances and goals as of 22 June 2024

Vladimír Trabalík (born 2 November 2002) is a Slovak professional footballer who currently plays for Liptovský Mikuláš as a forward.

== Club career ==
=== MŠK Žilina ===
Trabalík made his Fortuna Liga debut for Žilina against ViOn Zlaté Moravce on 22 May 2021. He came on in the second half, replacing Ján Bernát. The match resulted in a decisive 5:1 victory.
