= Zoran Záhradník =

Slovak footballer (born 2005)

Personal information
- Full name: Zoran Záhradník
- Date of birth: 19 August 2005 (age 21)
- Place of birth: Michalovce, Slovakia
- Height: 1.78 m (5 ft 10 in)
- Positions: Forward; attacking midfielder

Team information
- Current team: Dunajská Streda (on loan to Šamorín)
- Number: 25

Youth career
- 2015–2021: Zemplín Michalovce

Senior career*
Years	Team	Apps	(Gls)
2021–2023	Zemplín Michalovce	15	(0)
2023	→ Dunajská Streda (loan)	3	(1)
2023	→ Šamorín	12	(3)
2023–	Dunajská Streda	0	(0)
2023–	→ Šamorín (loan)	29	(4)

International career
2021–	Slovakia U17	12	(3)
- * Club domestic league appearances and goals as of 15 June 2025

Zoran Záhradník (born 19 August 2005) is a Slovak footballer who currently plays for Fortuna Liga club FC DAC 1904 Dunajská Streda and for FC ŠTK 1914 Šamorín as a forward, on loan from Zemplín Michalovce.

== Club career ==
=== Zemplín Michalovce ===
Záhradník made his Slovak league debut for MFK Zemplín Michalovce against MFK Tatran Liptovský Mikuláš on 21 August 2021. He has become the second youngest player (together with Jakub Vojtuš), playing in the top Slovak football league, after Andrej Rendla. Even before his debut, however, Záhradník attracted the attention of Italian team Spezia Calcio, featuring in trials at the club.
