= Adam Brenkus =

Slovak footballer (born 1999)

Personal information
- Date of birth: 8 January 1999 (age 27)
- Place of birth: Dolný Kubín, Slovakia
- Height: 1.79 m (5 ft 10 in)
- Position: Midfielder

Team information
- Current team: Sandecja Nowy Sącz
- Number: 29

Youth career
- 2005–2009: OŠK Istebné
- 2009–2015: Ružomberok
- 2015–2017: AS Trenčín
- 2017–2018: Ružomberok

Senior career*
Years	Team	Apps	(Gls)
2018–2022	Ružomberok	47	(4)
2022	→ Partizán Bardejov (loan)	10	(4)
2022–2024	ViOn Zlaté Moravce	53	(8)
2024–2025	Dukla Banská Bystrica	13	(0)
2025	Redfox FC Stará Ľubovňa	12	(6)
2025–	Sandecja Nowy Sącz	30	(6)

International career
2015–2016	Slovakia U17	6	(1)
2017–2018	Slovakia U19	3	(1)
2020	Slovakia U21	1	(0)
- * Club domestic league appearances and goals as of 14:20, 6 June 2026 (UTC)

Adam Brenkus (born 8 January 1999) is a Slovak professional footballer who plays as a midfielder for II liga club Sandecja Nowy Sącz.

On 21 July 2018, in the first round of the 2018–19 Slovak First Football League, Brenkus made his Fortuna Liga debut for Ružomberok against iClinic Sereď. He replaced Dalibor Takáč in the 77th minute of the match, that concluded as a goalless draw. By the end of the season, Brenkus made three more league appearances, but always as a substitute. He was in the starting line up of cup fixture against FK Gerlachov.
