= Gabriel Halabrín =

Slovak youth international footballer

Personal information
- Full name: Gabriel Halabrín
- Date of birth: 21 March 2003 (age 23)
- Place of birth: Skalica, Slovakia
- Height: 1.70 m (5 ft 7 in)
- Position: Midfielder

Team information
- Current team: Spartak Myjava

Youth career
- 2011–2021: Senica

Senior career*
Years	Team	Apps	(Gls)
2020–2022	Senica	25	(1)
2022–2025	Ružomberok	11	(0)
2023–2024	→ Spartak Myjava (loan)	22	(0)
2024–2025	→ Stará Ľubovňa (loan)	24	(0)
2025–	Spartak Myjava	0	(0)

International career^{‡}
2021–2022	Slovakia U19	11	(0)
- * Club domestic league appearances and goals as of 15 June 2025 ‡ National team caps and goals as of 08:43, 11 July 2022 (UTC)

Gabriel Halabrín (born 21 April 2003) is a Slovak footballer who plays for Spartak Myjava as a midfielder.

== Club career ==
=== FK Senica ===
A product of local academy, Halabrín made his professional Fortuna Liga debut for Senica against Ružomberok on 24 July 2021.

=== MFK Ružomberok ===
Ahead of the 2022–23 season, Halabrín signed a 4-year deal with MFK Ružomberok.
