= Abov Avetisyan =

Armenian footballer

Personal information
- Full name: Abov Avetikovych Avetisyan
- Date of birth: 3 October 2001 (age 25)
- Place of birth: Donetsk, Ukraine
- Height: 1.85 m (6 ft 1 in)
- Position: Right back

Team information
- Current team: ŠTK Šamorín
- Number: 4

Youth career
- –2014: Shakhtar Donetsk
- 2014–2016: Tarpa SC
- 2016–2020: Kisvárda

Senior career*
Years	Team	Apps	(Gls)
2020–2023	Kisvárda	1	(0)
2020–2022	→ Kisvárda II		
2023	→ Humenné (loan)	12	(0)
2023–2024	Humenné	26	(0)
2024–2025	Tatran Prešov	18	(0)
2025–	ŠTK Šamorín	23	(2)

International career
2021	Armenia U21	1	(0)
- * Club domestic league appearances and goals as of 25 May 2026

Abov Avetisyan (Ukrainian: Абов Аветікович Аветісян; born 3 October 2001) is a professional footballer who plays for Slovak 2. liga club ŠTK Šamorín. Born in Ukraine, he represents Armenia internationally.

== Career ==
Avetisyan is a product of FC Shakhtar Donetsk Youth Sportive School System, but in 2014 he was transferred from his native Donetsk to Zakarpattia Oblast, because of the Russo-Ukrainian War. He continued his youth career in Hungary.

== Career statistics ==
As of 13 June 2020.

Appearances and goals by club, season and competition
Club	Season	League			Cup		Continental		Other		Total	
Club	Season	Division	Apps	Goals	Apps	Goals	Apps	Goals	Apps	Goals	Apps	Goals
Kisvárda	2019–20	Nemzeti Bajnokság I	1	0	0	0	—		0	0	1	0
Kisvárda	Total		1	0	0	0	0	0	0	0	1	0
Career total			1	0	0	0	0	0	0	0	1	0
