= Sebastián Rák =

Slovak footballer

Personal information
- Full name: Sebastián Rák
- Date of birth: 31 July 2003 (age 23)
- Place of birth: Slovakia
- Position: Forward

Team information
- Current team: Zvolen
- Number: 7

Youth career
- 2011–2015: Nitra
- 2015–2018: ViOn Zlaté Moravce
- 2018–2019: ETO Győr
- 2019–: ViOn Zlaté Moravce
- 2021: → Nitra (loan)

Senior career*
| Years | Team | Apps | (Gls) |
| 2021–2024 | ViOn Zlaté Moravce | 3 | (0) |
| 2023–2024 | → Veľké Ludince (loan) | | |
| 2024– | Zvolen | 14 | (1) |
- * Club domestic league appearances and goals as of 2 January 2024

Sebastián Rák (born 31 July 2003) is a Slovak professional footballer who currently plays as a forward for Zvolen.

== Club career ==
=== FC ViOn Zlaté Moravce ===
Rák made his Fortuna Liga debut for ViOn Zlaté Moravce against Žilina on 30 October 2021. Debuting at 18 years and 92 days, Rák became ViOn's 7th youngest player to debut in Slovak top tier.

== Personal life ==
Rák is the son of a retired Slovak footballer Róbert Rák.
