= Dalibor Takáč =

Slovak footballer (born 1997)

Personal information
- Full name: Dalibor Takáč
- Date of birth: 11 October 1997 (age 29)
- Place of birth: Košice, Slovakia
- Height: 1.78 m (5 ft 10 in)
- Position: Midfielder

Team information
- Current team: Podbeskidzie
- Number: 8

Youth career
- 2007–2016: VSS Košice

Senior career*
Years	Team	Apps	(Gls)
2015	VSS Košice B	1	(0)
2015–2016	VSS Košice	34	(4)
2017–2022	Ružomberok	123	(10)
2022–2024	Korona Kielce	62	(1)
2024–2025	FC Košice	20	(1)
2025–	Podbeskidzie	32	(2)
- * Club domestic league appearances and goals as of 14:44, 6 June 2026 (UTC)

Dalibor Takáč (born 11 October 1997) is a Slovak professional footballer who plays as a midfielder for I liga club Podbeskidzie Bielsko-Biała.

== Club career ==
=== MFK Ružomberok ===
In January 2017, he signed a three-and-a-half-year contract with Ružomberok. Takáč made his Fortuna Liga debut for Ružomberok on 26 February 2017 against ŽP Šport Podbrezová. He played as a rotating player during his first season with Ružomberok.

Takáč played an important role in Ružomberok's Europa League qualification journey in the following season. In the first qualification round against Vojvodina, he came on from the bench in the second leg, forced Nikola Kovačević to score an own goal, which levelled the aggregates, and assisted Ján Maslo with a free kick to help Ružomberok come back from a 1–2 first leg deficiency. In the next round against Norwegian side Brann, he assisted Kristi Qose with a corner kick and created a penalty kick, which was converted by Dominik Kružliak. Ružomberok came back again to win 2–1 on aggregates.

== International ==
Takáč was called up to Slovakia U21 squad on 22 August 2017 for 2019 UEFA European Under-21 Championship qualification matches against Estonia and Northern Ireland. It was his first time to be nominated by the Slovak national team of any year level.
