= Ivan Rehák =

Slovak footballer

Personal information
- Date of birth: 27 April 2001 (age 25)
- Place of birth: Dubnica nad Váhom, Slovakia
- Position: Goalkeeper

Team information
- Current team: Podbrezová
- Number: 41

Youth career
- –2012: Dubnica nad Váhom
- 2012–2014: → Trenčín (loan)
- 2016–2018: Spartak Trnava

Senior career*
Years	Team	Apps	(Gls)
2018	Spartak Trnava	0	(0)
2019–2023	Podbrezová	4	(0)
2023	Pohronie	16	(0)
2024–2025	Podbrezová	15	(0)
2024–2025	→ Dukla Banská Bystrica (loan)	16	(0)
2026	Pohronie	13	(0)
2026–2023	Podbrezová	0	(0)
- * Club domestic league appearances and goals as of 21 September 2026

Ivan Rehák (born 22 May 2001) is a Slovak professional footballer who plays for Podbrezová as a goalkeeper.

== Club career ==
=== FK Železiarne Podbrezová ===
Rehák made his Fortuna Liga debut for Podbrezová fixture against Žilina on 5 May 2023.
