= Denis Baumgartner =

Slovak football midfielder

Personal information
- Full name: Denis Baumgartner
- Date of birth: 2 February 1998 (age 28)
- Place of birth: Skalica, Slovakia
- Height: 1.76 m (5 ft 9 in)
- Position: Midfielder

Team information
- Current team: FC ViOn Zlaté Moravce
- Number: 11

Youth career
- Senica
- 2014–2017: Sampdoria

Senior career*
Years	Team	Apps	(Gls)
2017–2019	Sampdoria	0	(0)
2017–2018	→ Livorno (loan)	5	(0)
2018–2019	→ DAC 1904 (loan)	1	(0)
2019–2020	Senica	18	(0)
2021–2024	Skalica	60	(10)
2024–2026	FC ViOn Zlaté Moravce	41	(7)

International career
2016	Slovakia U18	4	(1)
2016–2017	Slovakia U19	6	(1)
- * Club domestic league appearances and goals as of 25 May 2026

Denis Baumgartner (born 2 February 1998) is a Slovak football player who plays for FC ViOn Zlaté Moravce.

== Club career ==
=== Livorno Calcio ===
He made his Serie C debut for Livorno on 1 October 2017 in a game against Pontedera.

=== FC DAC 1904 Dunajská Streda ===
On 6 August 2018, Baumgartner joined to DAC Dunajská Streda on loan until 30 June 2019.

=== FK Senica ===
In the summer of 2019, Baumgartner had returned to his home club of FK Senica. He had signed a two-year deal with the team. He had left Senica in May 2020, amidst the coronavirus pandemic, as he apparently had a fall-out with club leadership over salary cuts during the pandemic. On top of 18 goal-less league appearances, Baumgartner also competed in 4 Slovnaft Cup matches and he scored a single goal.

=== MFK Skalica ===
On 4 February 2021, Baumgartner had signed a one-year contract with Slovak second division club MFK Skalica after half-year without an affiliation.
