= MŠK Žilina Africa F.C. =

Association football club in Ghana

MŠK Žilina Africa
- Full name: MŠK Žilina Africa Football Club
- Founded: 2018; 7 years ago
- Stadium: La MacDan town park
- Chairman: Ishmael Lamptey
- League: Ghana Division Two League
- 2024/25: 2nd
Home colours	Away colours

MŠK Žilina Africa Football Club (Slovak pronunciation: [ˈem ˈeʂ ˈkaː ˈʐilina]) is a Ghanaian football club affiliated to Slovak Superliga club MŠK Žilina. The club competes in the Ghana Division Two League under the Greater Accra Division Two League and also in the MTN FA Cup. The club is based in Labadi, a suburb of Accra, the capital city of Ghana.

The club was founded in 2018. The club adopted the La MacDan town park as their official home grounds.

== History ==
In 2018, the club was founded as an affiliate club of MŠK Žilina, who play in the Slovak Superliga. That same year, some of the MŠK Žilina’s current first team players were brought over from Africa FC including Benson Anang and Baba Hamza. In 2021, Ivan Anokye Mensah was selected to be part of the Ghana U20 team which went on to win the 2021 WAFU U20 Cup and 2021 Africa U-20 Cup of Nations. He was later transferred to Ghana Premier League side International Allies.

At the end of their inaugural season, 2021 season, two of their players, Maxwell Opoku and Emmanuel Asante joined Accra Great Olympics, after putting up impressive performances in the Division Two League. The latter scored seven goals in nine outings to emerge the top scorer in the Division Two Zone 5A.

== Affiliate clubs ==
The following clubs are currently affiliated with MŠK Žilina Africa:

- (Slovakia) MŠK Žilina (2018–present)
