= James Ndjeungoue =

Cameroonian footballer

Personal information
- Full name: James Willy Ndjeungoue
- Date of birth: 4 April 2003 (age 23)
- Place of birth: Cameroon
- Height: 1.86 m (6 ft 1 in)
- Position: Centre-back

Team information
- Current team: Kortrijk
- Number: 5

Youth career
- –2022: Gambinos Stars

Senior career*
Years	Team	Apps	(Gls)
2022–2024	Žilina B	27	(0)
2023–2024	Žilina	43	(0)
2025–	Kortrijk	34	(1)

International career^{‡}
2025–	Cameroon	2	(0)
- * Club domestic league appearances and goals as of 19 April 2026 ‡ National team caps and goals as of 04:10, 13 June 2025 (UTC)

James Willy Ndjeungoue (born 4 April 2003) is a Cameroonian professional footballer who plays for Belgian Pro League club Kortrijk as a centre-back.

== Club career ==
=== MŠK Žilina ===
Ndjeungoue made his Fortuna Liga debut for Žilina against Slovan Bratislava on 23 April 2023.

=== Kortrijk ===
On 29 January 2025, Ndjeungoue signed a three-and-a-half-year contract with Kortrijk in Belgium.

== Career statistics ==
=== Club ===
As of match played 30 August 2025

Appearances and goals by club, season and competition
Club	Season	League			National cup (Note: Includes Slovak Cup, Belgian Cup)		Europe		Other		Total	
Club	Season	Division	Apps	Goals	Apps	Goals	Apps	Goals	Apps	Goals	Apps	Goals
Žilina B	2022–23	2. Liga	23	0	—		—		—		23	0
Žilina	2022–23	Slovak First Football League	4	0	—		—		—		4	0
Žilina	2023–24	Slovak First Football League	27	0	3	0	1 (Note: Appearance in UEFA Conference League)	0	—		31	0
Žilina	2024–25	Slovak First Football League	16	0	2	0	—		—		18	0
Žilina	Total		47	0	5	0	1	0	—		53	0
Kortrijk	2024–25	Belgian Pro League	8	0	—		—		—		8	0
Kortrijk	2025–26	Challenger Pro League	4	0	1	0	—		—		5	0
Kortrijk	Total		12	0	1	0	—		—		13	0
Career total			82	0	6	0	1	0	0	0	89	0

=== International ===
As of match played 9 June 2025

Appearances and goals by national team and year
National team	Year	Apps	Goals
Cameroon	2025	2	0
Total		2	0
