= Kristi Qose =

Albanian footballer

Personal information
- Full name: Kristi Qose
- Date of birth: 10 June 1995 (age 31)
- Place of birth: Bilisht, Korçë, Albania
- Height: 1.89 m (6 ft 2 in)
- Position: Defensive midfielder

Team information
- Current team: MFK Zvolen

Youth career
- 2009–2014: PAOK
- 2012: → Iraklis (loan)

Senior career*
Years	Team	Apps	(Gls)
2013–2017	PAOK	1	(0)
2014–2015	→ Apollon Pontus (loan)	0	(0)
2015–2016	→ Panserraikos (loan)	10	(0)
2016–2017	→ Zemplín Michalovce (loan)	25	(0)
2017–2020	Ružomberok	77	(14)
2020–2022	Karviná	71	(9)
2022	Viktoria Plzeň	1	(0)
2023	Zemplín Michalovce	11	(0)
2023–2024	FC Košice	27	(2)
2024–2026	AF Elbasani	55	(4)
2026-	MFK Zvolen	0	(0)

International career^{‡}
2013–2014	Albania U19	4	(0)
2014–2015	Albania U21	6	(0)
2014–2019	Albania	3	(0)
- * Club domestic league appearances and goals as of 24 June 2026 ‡ National team caps and goals as of 17 November 2019

Kristi Qose (born 10 June 1995) is an Albanian professional footballer who plays as a defensive midfielder, currently for Slovak club MFK Zvolen. Prior his arrival to Elbasani he played for Czech club Viktoria Plzeň and Slovak Zemplín Michalovce.

== Club career ==
=== Early career ===
Qose born in Korçë, Albania and his family moved to Greece when he was young. He grow up at academies of PAOK among Ergys Kaçe, another Albanian expatriate footballer.

=== PAOK ===
He made his debut on 13 April 2014 playing the full 90-minutes match against Levadiakos, finished in the 3–2 loss.

==== Loan to Apollon 1926 ====
In August 2014 he was loaned out to Apollon Pontus to gain more experience.

=== Viktoria Plzeň ===
Before the 2022–23 season, Qose transferred to Viktoria Plzeň, with whom he qualified for the UEFA Champions League. Shortly after, in a match in the third Czech league for Viktoria Plzeň B, he reacted to the awarding of a red card by insulting the referee. In response, he received a four-month ban from the Football Association of the Czech Republic and the club released him. He appeared in only one Czech First League match for Viktoria Plzeň.

== International career ==
=== Albania U19 ===
He made it his first international debut with Albania national under-19 football team in the 2014 UEFA European Under-19 Championship qualifying round in a 1–0 loss against Greece U19 in the opening match. He played the full 90-minutes match and received a yellow card in the 57th minute. He played another full 90-minutes match against Slovakia U19 match finished in a 1–1 draw and played as a starter for 86 minutes in the closing match against Bulgaria U19 when he was substituted off for Mario Kame in another 1–1 draw.

=== Albania U21 ===
Qose advanced higherly at international level as he was called up for the first time with Albania national under-21 football team by coach Skënder Gega for the friendly match against Italy U21 on 6 May 2014.

==== 2017 UEFA European Under-21 Championship qualification ====
Qose was called up for the 2017 UEFA European Under-21 Championship qualification opening match against Liechtenstein on 28 March 2015. He made it his competitive debut for under-21 side against Liechtenstein playing as a starter in the 0–2 away victory where he was substituted off in the 77th minute for Klaudio Hyseni. He managed to play another two matches as a starter during campaign but were substituted off in the second half and one other as a substitute.

=== Albania senior team ===
He was called up by Albania national football team coach Gianni De Biasi for the match against San Marino on 8 June 2014. He debuted for senior team against San Marino, coming on as a substitute in the 73rd minute in place of Andi Lila.

== Career statistics ==
=== Club ===
As of 13 April 2014

Season	Club	League country	League		League Cup		Europe		Total	
Season	Club	League country	Apps	Goals	Apps	Goals	Apps	Goals	Apps	Goals
2013–14	PAOK	Super League Greece	1	0	0	0	-	-	1	0
Total			1	0	0	0	0	0	1	0
2014–15	Apollon Pontus	Football League (Greece)	0	0	0	0	-	-	0	0
Total			0	0	0	0	0	0	0	0
Career total			1	0	0	0	0	0	1	0

=== International ===
As of 17 November 2019

Albania national team
Year	Apps	Goals
2014	1	0
2019	2	0
Total	3	0
