= 2025–26 MŠK Žilina season =

Žilina
2025–26 season
- Manager: Pavol Staňo
- Stadium: Štadión pod Dubňom
- Slovak First Football League: 4th
- Slovak Cup: Winners
- UEFA Conference League: Second qualifying round
- Top goalscorer: League: Michal Faško (14); All: Michal Faško (16)
- Highest home attendance: 5,866 v Slovan Bratislava (18 April 2026, Slovak First Football League)
- Lowest home attendance: 582 v Skalica (25 November 2025, Slovak Cup)
- Average home league attendance: 2,329
- Biggest win: 8–0 v Zubrohlava (Away, 24 September 2025, Slovak Cup)
- Biggest defeat: 0–3 v Raków Częstochowa (Away, 24 July 2025, UEFA Conference League)
Home colours	Away colours	Third colours

The 2025–26 season was Mestský športový klub Žilina's 30th consecutive season in the Slovak First Football League. In addition to the domestic league, Žilina participated in the Slovak Cup and the UEFA Conference League.

== Squad ==
As of 4 March 2026

Note: Flags indicate national team as defined under FIFA eligibility rules; some limited exceptions apply. Players may hold more than one non-FIFA nationality.

No.	Pos.	Nation	Player
1	GK	SVK	Jakub Badžgoň
2	DF	SVK	Marek Okál
6	MF	CMR	Xavier Adang
7	FW	SVK	František Kóša
8	FW	HUN	Regő Szánthó
9	FW	SVK	Patrik Baleja
10	MF	ROU	Andrei Florea
11	MF	POL	Fabian Bzdyl
13	DF	SVK	Teodor Staník
14	DF	SVK	Michal Svoboda
16	FW	SVK	Patrik Iľko
17	DF	SVK	Ján Minárik
20	DF	SVK	Krisztián Bari
21	DF	SVK	Timotej Hranica

No.	Pos.	Nation	Player
22	GK	SVK	Jakub Jokl
23	MF	SVK	Michal Faško
24	MF	SVK	Samuel Ďatko
25	DF	CZE	Filip Kaša
28	DF	GEO	Aleksandre Narimanidze
29	GK	CZE	Dominik Sváček (on loan from (Czech Republic) Zbrojovka Brno)
33	DF	SVK	Tobiáš Pališčák
34	FW	SVK	Lukáš Prokop
39	FW	CZE	Lukáš Juliš
66	MF	SVK	Miroslav Káčer
77	FW	ARG	Nehuén Mendoza (on loan from (Argentina) Instituto)
90	FW	ESP	Dani Homet
95	FW	CRO	Marko Roginić

== Transfers ==
=== Summer ===
In: Note: Flags indicate national team as defined under FIFA eligibility rules; some limited exceptions apply. Players may hold more than one non-FIFA nationality.

No.	Pos.	Nation	Player
—	MF	SVK	Michal Faško (from FC Košice)
—	FW	CZE	Lukáš Juliš (from (Czech Republic) SK Sigma Olomouc)
—	DF	CZE	Filip Kaša (from (Hungary) Győri ETO FC)

Out: Note: Flags indicate national team as defined under FIFA eligibility rules; some limited exceptions apply. Players may hold more than one non-FIFA nationality.

No.	Pos.	Nation	Player
—	DF	SVK	Tomáš Hubočan (Retired)
—	MF	SVK	Mário Sauer (to (France) Toulouse FC)
15	DF	CIV	Adama Drame (to (Austria) Wolfsberger AC)
—	FW	SVK	Dávid Ďuriš (to (Norway) Rosenborg BK)
—	MF	GHA	Samuel Gidi (to (United States) FC Cincinnati)
—	FW	SVK	Adrián Kaprálik (to (Germany) Holstein Kiel)

=== Winter ===
In: Note: Flags indicate national team as defined under FIFA eligibility rules; some limited exceptions apply. Players may hold more than one non-FIFA nationality.

No.	Pos.	Nation	Player
—	GK	CZE	Dominik Sváček (on loan from (Czech Republic) FC Zbrojovka Brno)
77	FW	ARG	Nehuén Mendoza (on loan from (Argentina) Instituto Atlético Central Córdoba)
90	FW	ESP	Daniel Homet (from (Spain) Reus FC Reddis)

Out: Note: Flags indicate national team as defined under FIFA eligibility rules; some limited exceptions apply. Players may hold more than one non-FIFA nationality.

No.	Pos.	Nation	Player
—	GK	SVK	Ľubomír Belko (to (Norway) Viking FK)
—	DF	SVK	Samuel Kopásek (to (Czech Republic) FK Pardubice)

== Competitions ==
=== Overview ===
Competition	First match	Last match	Starting round	Final position	Record							
Competition	First match	Last match	Starting round	Final position	Pld	W	D	L	GF	GA	GD	Win %
Slovak First Football League	27 July 2025	16 May 2026	Matchday 1	4th	32	15	7	10	59	41	+18	46.88
Slovak Cup	27 August 2025	1 May 2026	Second round	Winners	8	7	1	0	28	4	+24	87.50
UEFA Conference League	24 July 2025	31 July 2025	Second qualifying round	Second qualifying round	2	0	0	2	1	6	−5	0.00
Total					42	22	8	12	88	51	+37	52.38

Source: Competitions

=== Slovak First Football League ===
==== Regular season ====
===== League table =====
Pos	Team	Pld	W	D	L	GF	GA	GD	Pts	Qualification
1	Slovan Bratislava	22	14	4	4	47	30	+17	46	Qualification for the championship group
2	DAC Dunajská Streda	22	12	7	3	39	20	+19	43	Qualification for the championship group
3	Žilina	22	11	7	4	45	27	+18	40	Qualification for the championship group
4	Spartak Trnava	22	11	4	7	35	28	+7	37	Qualification for the championship group
5	Podbrezová	22	11	3	8	46	29	+17	36	Qualification for the championship group
6	Zemplín Michalovce	22	8	5	9	32	36	−4	29	Qualification for the championship group

Source: Niké liga (in Slovak)
Rules for classification: 1) Points; 2) Head-to-head points; 3) Head-to-head goal difference; 4) Head-to-head away goals scored; 5) Play-off.

===== Results summary =====
Overall								Home						Away					
Pld	W	D	L	GF	GA	GD	Pts	W	D	L	GF	GA	GD	W	D	L	GF	GA	GD
22	11	7	4	45	27	+18	40	7	3	1	24	11	+13	4	4	3	21	16	+5

Source: Niké liga

===== Results by round =====
Round	1	2	3	4	5	6	7	8	9	10	11	12	13	14	15	16	17	18	19	20	21	22
Ground	A	H	A	A	H	A	H	A	H	H	A	H	A	H	H	A	H	A	H	A	A	H
Result	D	W	W	L	W	D	D	W	D	W	W	W	W	W	W	L	L	L	W	D	D	D
Position	9	6	4	5	4	5	4	4	4	4	2	1	1	1	1	2	3	4	3	3	3	3
Points	1	4	7	7	10	11	12	15	16	19	22	25	28	31	34	34	34	34	37	38	39	40

Source: Worldfootball
A = Away; H = Home; W = Win; D = Draw; L = Loss

===== Matches =====
27 July 2025 1	Skalica	0–0	Žilina	Skalica
17:00 CEST (UTC+2)	Junas (yellow card) 62'	Report	Prokop (yellow card) 1'; Narimanidze (yellow card) 56'; Kaša (yellow card) 88'	Stadium: Mestský štadión Skalica; Attendance: 613; Referee: Bálint Kišš; Assistant referees: František Ferenc, Matej Hrebeňár

3 August 2025 2	Žilina	1–0	Tatran Prešov	Žilina
19:00 CEST (UTC+2)	Kaša 45'; Ďatko (yellow card) 67'; Sanusi (yellow card) 90'; Káčer (yellow card) 90'	Report	Potoma (yellow card) 5'; Regáli (yellow card) 21'; Sipľak (yellow card) 31'; Siheyev (yellow card) 46'; Morim (yellow card) 80'	Stadium: Štadión pod Dubňom; Attendance: 1,864; Referee: Martin Dohál; Assistant referees: Jakub Košecký, Ákos Juhos

9 August 2025 3	Zemplín Michalovce	2–4	Žilina	Michalovce
18:00 CEST (UTC+2)	Bednár (yellow card) 45'; Paulauskas 57'; Ramos 76'	Report	Faško 15'; Bari 28'; Pauschek 44' (o.g.); Kaprálik 45'; Sanusi (yellow card) 67' (yellow-red card) 84'	Stadium: Mestský futbalový štadión Attendance: 2,738; Referee: Filip Glova; Assistant referees: Peter Bednár, Mário Roszbeck

17 August 2025 4	Trenčín	2–1	Žilina	Trenčín
19:00 CEST (UTC+2)	Kam (yellow card) 24'; Hájovský 39'; Khan 69'	Report	Kaprálik 26'	Stadium: Štadión Sihoť; Attendance: 2,109; Referee: Erik Gemzický; Assistant referees: Ján Pozor, Simeon Vass

24 August 2025 5	Žilina	3–0	Podbrezová	Žilina
19:00 CEST (UTC+2)	Faško 17' (pen.), 53'; Káčer 74'	Report	Bondarenko (yellow card) 70'; Niňaj (yellow card) 90'; Šiler (yellow card) 90+4'	Stadium: Štadión pod Dubňom; Attendance: 1,908; Referee: Jaroslav Sučka; Assistant referees: Milan Štrbo, Patrik Kmec

31 August 2025 6	Ružomberok	3–3	Žilina	Ružomberok
17:00 CEST (UTC+2)	Hladík 8'; Šašinka 26'; Selecký 33'; Šulek (yellow card) 60'; Bačík (yellow card) 83'	Report	Kopásek (yellow card) 28'; Ďatko 45'; Faško 55' (pen.); Roginić (yellow card) 86'; Kóša 90'	Stadium: Štadión pod Čebraťom; Attendance: 1,567; Referee: Peter Kráľovič; Assistant referees: Ákos Juhos, Dávid Bobko

13 September 2025 7	Žilina	3–3	Slovan Bratislava	Žilina
20:30 CEST (UTC+2)	Ďatko 5', 24'; Adang (yellow card) 6'; Káčer 33', (yellow card) 75'; Minárik (yellow card) 88'	Report	Barseghyan 25' (pen.), 59'; Ihnatenko (red card) 88'; Kukharevych 89'; Weiss (yellow card) 90'	Stadium: Štadión pod Dubňom; Attendance: 5,599; Referee: Martin Dohál; Assistant referees: Adam Jekkel, Andrej Hrmo

21 September 2025 8	Komárno	1–3	Žilina	Zlaté Moravce
17:00 CEST (UTC+2)	Šmehyl (yellow card) 44', (goal) 84' (pen.); Žák (yellow card) 63'; Pillár (red card) 90+3'	Report	Prokop 45+2'; Káčer 50', (yellow card) 89'; Iľko 63'; Staník (yellow card) 82'; Adang (yellow card) 86'	Stadium: ViOn Aréna; Attendance: 415; Referee: Marián Ruc; Assistant referees: Adam Jekkel, Simeon Vass

28 September 2025 9	Žilina	2–2	Spartak Trnava	Žilina
19:00 CEST (UTC+2)	Iľko 23'; Faško 69'	Report	Stojsavljević (yellow card) 57'; Procházka 72'; Khorkheli (yellow card) 76'; Gong 85'; Mikovič (yellow card) 90'	Stadium: Štadión pod Dubňom; Attendance: 4,261; Referee: Michal Smolák; Assistant referees: Andrej Hrmo, Mário Roszbeck

4 October 2025 10	Žilina	4–1	Košice	Žilina
20:30 CEST (UTC+2)	Iľko 3'; Káčer 6'; Adang 57'; Faško 63' (pen.); Prokop (yellow card) 85'	Report	Kovács 37'; Kružliak (yellow card) 58'; Teplan (yellow card) 70'	Stadium: Štadión pod Dubňom; Attendance: 1,756; Referee: Matej Choreň; Assistant referees: Dušan Štofik, Peter Čajka

19 October 2025 11	DAC Dunajská Streda	1–2	Žilina	Dunajská Streda
18:00 CEST (UTC+2)	Modesto (yellow card) 39'; Sylla 62', (yellow card) 77'; Gruber (yellow card) 84'	Report	Roginić 34', 45+2', (yellow card) 61'; Bari (yellow card) 58'; Kopásek (yellow card) 82'	Stadium: MOL Aréna; Attendance: 4,768; Referee: Lukáš Dzivjak; Assistant referees: František Ferenc, Dávid Bobko

25 October 2025 12	Žilina	3–2	Skalica	Žilina
15:30 CEST (UTC+2)	Faško 21', 67' (pen.); Ďatko 26'; Pališčák (yellow card) 41'; Kaša (yellow card) 76'; Prokop (yellow card) 79'	Report	Švec (yellow card) 21', (goal) 25', 62'; Černek (yellow card) 66'; Šimko (yellow card) 82'	Stadium: Štadión pod Dubňom; Attendance: 1,423; Referee: Bálint Kišš; Assistant referees: Simeon Vass, Peter Čajka

1 November 2025 13	Tatran Prešov	0–4	Žilina	Prešov
15:30 CET (UTC+1)	Sipľak (yellow card) 39'; Olejník (yellow card) 68'; Gáll (yellow card) 90'	Report	Roginić (yellow card) 37', (goal) 73'; Adang 43'; Kaša (yellow card) 69'; Faško 70' (pen.); Kóša 88'	Stadium: Futbal Tatran Arena; Attendance: 6,160; Referee: Michal Smolák; Assistant referees: Peter Bednár, Mário Roszbeck

8 November 2025 14	Žilina	2–0	Zemplín Michalovce	Žilina
18:00 CET (UTC+1)	Ďatko 25'; Adang 59'; Bari (yellow card) 66'	Report	Čurma (yellow card) 10'; François (yellow card) 85'	Stadium: Štadión pod Dubňom; Attendance: 1,671; Referee: Boris Marhefka; Assistant referees: Matej Zemko, Jakub Košecký

22 November 2025 15	Žilina	4–1	Trenčín	Žilina
15:30 CET (UTC+1)	Roginić 46'; Faško 59', 63', 74' (pen.); Pališčák (yellow card) 86'	Report	Skovajsa 87' (pen.)	Stadium: Štadión pod Dubňom; Attendance: 1,354; Referee: Bálint Kišš; Assistant referees: Branislav Hancko, Patrik Kmec

30 November 2025 16	Podbrezová	2–0	Žilina	Podbrezová
18:00 CET (UTC+1)	Chyla (yellow card) 39'; Šiler 48'; Štefánik 52'; Palumets (yellow card) 57'; Paraj (yellow card) 90'	Report	Káčer (yellow card) 66'	Stadium: ZELPO Aréna; Attendance: 557; Referee: Ivan Kružliak; Assistant referees: Tomáš Straka, Matej Hrebeňár

6 December 2025 17	Žilina	1–2	Ružomberok	Žilina
15:30 CET (UTC+1)	Kopásek 39'; Roginić (yellow card) 58'; Káčer (yellow card) 65'; Kóša (yellow card) 90+7'	Report	Tučný 5'; Endl (yellow card) 44' (yellow-red card) 90+7'; Luterán (yellow card) 58'; Fila (yellow card) 63'; Hladík 72'; Húska (yellow card) 84'	Stadium: Štadión pod Dubňom; Attendance: 1,536; Referee: Matej Choreň; Assistant referees: Dušan Štofik, Martin Vitko

14 December 2025 18	Slovan Bratislava	3–2	Žilina	Bratislava
18:00 CET (UTC+1)	Tolić 5', 45'; Blackman 53'; Mak (yellow card) 77'	Report	Roginić 58', (yellow card) 90'; Szánthó 89'	Stadium: Tehelné pole Attendance: 5,236; Referee: Peter Kráľovič; Assistant referees: Milan Štrbo, Daniel Poláček

8 February 2026 19	Žilina	1–0	Komárno	Žilina
15:30 CET (UTC+1)	Káčer (yellow card) 10'; Faško 20'	Report	Kiss (yellow card) 34'; Špiriak (yellow card) 53'; Gamboš (yellow card) 78'	Stadium: Štadión pod Dubňom; Attendance: 1,255; Referee: Peter Ziemba; Assistant referees: Patrik Kmec, Simeon Vass

15 February 2026 20	Spartak Trnava	0–0	Žilina	Trnava
18:00 CET (UTC+1)		Report		Stadium: Anton Malatinský Stadium; Attendance: 3,069; Referee: Michal Smolák; Assistant referees: Dušan Štofik, Tomáš Straka

22 February 2026 21	Košice	2–2	Žilina	Košice
18:00 CET (UTC+1)	Krivák (yellow card) 1'; Perišić 52'; Madleňák 76'	Report	Krivák 3' (o.g.); Pališčák (yellow card) 14'; Hranica 25'; Kaša (yellow card) 72'	Stadium: Košická futbalová aréna Attendance: 2,482; Referee: Lukáš Dzivjak; Assistant referees: Tobiáš Pacák, Peter Čajka

28 February 2026 22	Žilina	0–0	DAC Dunajská Streda	Žilina
15:30 CET (UTC+1)	Kaša (yellow card) 42'; Adang (yellow card) 77'	Report	Blažek (yellow card) 25'; Kmeť (yellow card) 75'	Stadium: Štadión pod Dubňom; Attendance: 2,083; Referee: Ivan Kružliak; Assistant referees: Dušan Štofik, Jakub Košecký

==== Championship group ====
===== League table =====
Pos	Team	Pld	W	D	L	GF	GA	GD	Pts	Qualification	SLO	DAC	TRN	ŽIL	ZMI	POD
1	Slovan Bratislava (C)	32	21	5	6	62	37	+25	68	Qualification for the Champions League second qualifying round (Note: Slovan Bratislava was promoted to the Champions League second qualifying round as one of the two champions with the highest coefficient in Champions League first qualifying round, via Champions League re-balancing.)	—	1–0	2–2	0–1	0–2	2–0
2	DAC Dunajská Streda	32	17	7	8	55	34	+21	58	Qualification for the Conference League second qualifying round	0–3	—	3–0	3–1	3–0	2–1
3	Spartak Trnava	32	17	5	10	51	37	+14	56	Qualification for the Conference League second qualifying round	0–1	2–1	—	1–0	3–0	4–1
4	Žilina	32	15	7	10	59	41	+18	52	Qualification for the Europa League first qualifying round (Note: Žilina qualified for the Europa League first qualifying round as the 2025–26 Slovak Cup winners.)	0–1	3–1	0–1	—	3–2	0–2
5	Zemplín Michalovce	32	13	5	14	44	52	−8	44		1–3	2–1	1–0	2–1	—	1–2
6	Podbrezová	32	13	3	16	55	51	+4	42		1–2	1–2	0–3	1–5	0–1	—

Source: Niké liga (in Slovak)
Rules for classification: 1) Points; 2) Points in regular season; 3) Head-to-head points in regular season; 4) Head-to-head goal difference in regular season; 5) Head-to-head goals scored in regular season; 6) Head-to-head away goals scored in regular season (if two teams tied); 7) Goal difference; 8) Goals scored; 9) Fair play ranking; 10) Drawing of lots.
(C) Champions

===== Results summary =====
Overall								Home						Away					
Pld	W	D	L	GF	GA	GD	Pts	W	D	L	GF	GA	GD	W	D	L	GF	GA	GD
10	4	0	6	14	14	0	12	2	0	3	6	7	−1	2	0	3	8	7	+1

Source: Worldfootball

===== Results by round =====
Round	23	24	25	26	27	28	29	30	31	32
Ground	H	A	H	A	A	H	A	H	A	H
Result	L	W	W	L	W	L	L	W	L	L
Position	3	3	2	2	2	4	4	4	4	4
Points	40	43	46	46	49	49	49	52	52	52

Source: Worldfootball
A = Away; H = Home; W = Win; D = Draw; L = Loss

===== Matches =====
7 March 2026 23	Žilina	0–1	Spartak Trnava	Žilina
18:00 CET (UTC+1)		Report	Khorkheli 4'; Sabo (yellow card) 59'; Vantruba (yellow card) 72'	Stadium: Štadión pod Dubňom; Attendance: 2,247; Referee: Marián Ruc; Assistant referees: Branislav Hancko, Martin Vitko

15 March 2026 24	Slovan Bratislava	0–1	Žilina	Bratislava
18:00 CET (UTC+1)	Blackman (yellow card) 63'; Weiss (yellow card) 90'	Report	Káčer (yellow card) 76'; Faško 84'	Stadium: Tehelné pole Attendance: 8,479; Referee: Peter Ziemba; Assistant referees: Adam Jekkel, Dávid Bobko

21 March 2026 25	Žilina	3–1	DAC Dunajská Streda	Žilina
15:30 CET (UTC+1)	Káčer 7'; Roginić 42'; Homet 84'	Report	Kmeť 47'	Stadium: Štadión pod Dubňom; Attendance: 1,810; Referee: Peter Kráľovič; Assistant referees: Milan Štrbo, Peter Čajka

4 April 2026 26	Zemplín Michalovce	2–1	Žilina	Michalovce
15:30 CEST (UTC+2)	Dzotsenidze (yellow card) 15'; Lemishko (yellow card) 52'; Cottrell 69', 87'; Jakubech (yellow card) 90'	Report	Bari (yellow card) 29'; Ďatko 53'; Badžgoň (yellow card) 90'	Stadium: Mestský futbalový štadión Attendance: 2,483; Referee: Martin Dohál; Assistant referees: Peter Bednár, Jakub Košecký

11 April 2026 27	Podbrezová	1–5	Žilina	Podbrezová
15:30 CEST (UTC+2)	Chyla (yellow card) 44'; Mrvaljević 52'; Khyminets (yellow card) 73'	Report	Narimanidze (yellow card) 27'; Florea (yellow card) 44'; Roginić 55', 87'; Homet 63'; Káčer 65'; Hranica 82'	Stadium: ZELPO Aréna; Attendance: 426; Referee: Peter Ziemba; Assistant referees: František Ferenc, Tobiáš Pacák

18 April 2026 28	Žilina	0–1	Slovan Bratislava	Žilina
18:00 CEST (UTC+2)	Kaša (yellow card) 62'; Florea (yellow card) 90+2'	Report	Ibrahim (yellow card) 46'; Weiss 83', (yellow card) 83'; Blackman (yellow card) 85'	Stadium: Štadión pod Dubňom; Attendance: 5,866; Referee: Bálint Kišš; Assistant referees: Branislav Hancko, František Ferenc

25 April 2026 29	DAC Dunajská Streda	3–1	Žilina	Dunajská Streda
20:30 CEST (UTC+2)	Gruber 36'; Sylla 63'; Nemanič (yellow card) 71'; Kukovec 84'; Kapanadze (yellow card) 90+3'	Report	Ďatko 45+1'; Adang (yellow card) 67'	Stadium: MOL Aréna; Attendance: 4,269; Referee: Erik Gemzický; Assistant referees: Adam Jekkel, Tobiáš Pacák

5 May 2026 30	Žilina	3–2	Zemplín Michalovce	Žilina
18:00 CEST (UTC+2)	Bzdyl 5'; Narimanidze 18'; Kóša 74'	Report	Taylor-Hart 4', (yellow card) 33'; Ahl 10'	Stadium: Štadión pod Dubňom; Attendance: 1,049; Referee: Filip Glova; Assistant referees: Tobiáš Pacák, Matej Hrebeňár

10 May 2026 31	Spartak Trnava	1–0	Žilina	Trnava
19:00 CEST (UTC+2)	Koštrna (yellow card) 51'; Khorkheli (yellow card) 56'; Skrbo (yellow card) 79'; M. Ďuriš 90', (yellow card) 90'	Report	Adang (yellow card) 63'; Roginić (yellow card) 90'	Stadium: Anton Malatinský Stadium; Attendance: 6,257; Referee: Marián Ruc; Assistant referees: Ján Pozor, Dušan Štofik

16 May 2026 32	Žilina	0–2	Podbrezová	Žilina
17:00 CEST (UTC+2)	Roginić (yellow card) 47'; Ďatko (yellow card) 87'	Report	Bari 6' (o.g.); Šiler (yellow card) 34'; Mrvaljević 43'; Luka (yellow card) 85'	Stadium: Štadión pod Dubňom; Attendance: 1,586; Referee: Martin Dohál; Assistant referees: Patrik Kmec, Matej Hrebeňár

=== Slovak Cup ===
27 August 2025 Second round	Vysoká nad Kysucou	1–7	Žilina	Vysoká nad Kysucou
17:00 CEST (UTC+2)	Novák 18'	Report	Kóša 2', 36', 72', 82'; Juliš 32'; Ďatko 60'; Hranica 76'	Attendance: 800; Referee: Michal Očenáš; Assistant referees: Dávid Hrobárik, Jakub Kolesnáč

24 September 2025 Third round	Zubrohlava	0–8	Žilina	Zubrohlava
15:30 CEST (UTC+2)		Report	Bari 7'; Prokop 23'; Minárik 50'; Traore 57'; Staník 70', 79'; Hranica 84'; Ďatko 90'	Attendance: 680; Referee: Filip Matej; Assistant referees: Michal Železňák, Matúš Gregorec

29 October 2025 Fourth round	Senec	0–1	Žilina	Senec
16:30 CET (UTC+1)	Šimončič (yellow card) 21'; Šipoš (yellow card) 33'; Csémy (yellow card) 90+6'	Report	Svoboda (yellow card) 32'; Adang 90+3'	Stadium: NTC Senec; Attendance: 586; Referee: Filip Malárik; Assistant referees: Tomáš Straka, Róbert Šandrik

25 November 2025 Round of 16	Žilina	3–1	Skalica	Žilina
15:30 CET (UTC+1)	Guinari 40' (o.g.); Hranica 57'; Lérant (yellow card) 81' (not on pitch); Prokop 90'	Report	Bariš (yellow card) 21'; Daniel 37'; Juračka (yellow card) 81' (not on pitch)	Stadium: Štadión pod Dubňom; Attendance: 582; Referee: Peter Ziemba; Assistant referees: Simeon Vass, Dávid Bobko; Fourth official: Jaroslav Sučka

10 March 2026 Quarter-finals	Žilina	3–0	Trenčín	Žilina
18:00 CET (UTC+1)	Roginić 20'; Faško 27'; Hranica 29'	Report		Stadium: Štadión pod Dubňom; Attendance: 1,334; Referee: Peter Kráľovič; Assistant referees: Milan Štrbo, Peter Bednár; Fourth official: Igor Valent

18 March 2026 Semi-finals First leg	Žilina	2–0	Podbrezová	Žilina
19:30 CET (UTC+1)	Roginić 18'; Minárik 41'; Bari (yellow card) 61'; Szánthó (yellow card) 80'	Report	Jurička (red card) 28'; Silagadze (yellow card) 45+4'; Paraj (yellow card) 79'; Domanisky (yellow card) 90+3'	Stadium: Štadión pod Dubňom; Attendance: 1,739; Referee: Marián Ruc; Assistant referees: Ján Pozor, Dušan Štofik; Fourth official: Matej Choreň

14 April 2026 Semi-finals Second leg	Podbrezová	1–1 (1–3 agg.)	Žilina	Podbrezová
18:00 CEST (UTC+2)	Šiler 21', (yellow card) 53'; Palumets (yellow card) 43'; Chyla (yellow card) 56'; Kováčik (yellow card) 66'	Report	Roginić 17'; Kaša (yellow card) 58'; Adang (yellow card) 72'; Badžgoň (yellow card) 84'; Praženica (yellow card) 89' (not on pitch); Ďatko (yellow card) 90+7'	Stadium: ZELPO Aréna; Attendance: 2,476; Referee: Michal Smolák; Assistant referees: Branislav Hancko, Ján Pozor; Fourth official: Bálint Kišš
Note: Žilina won 3–1 on aggregate.

1 May 2026 Final	Žilina	3–1	Košice	Žilina
16:00 CEST (UTC+2)	Faško 16'; Kaša 40'; Roginić 48', (yellow card) 88'	Report	Madleňák (yellow card) 33'; Dimun (yellow card) 88'; Miljanić 89'	Stadium: Štadión pod Dubňom; Attendance: 9,723; Referee: Peter Kráľovič; Assistant referees: Milan Štrbo, Matej Zemko; Fourth official: Martin Dohál

=== UEFA Conference League ===
==== Qualifying ====
===== Second qualifying round =====
24 July 2025 First leg	Raków Częstochowa (Poland)	3–0	(Slovakia) Žilina	Częstochowa, Poland
21:00 CEST (UTC+2)	Repka 48'; Brunes 58' (pen.); Diaby-Fadiga 73'	Report	Minárik (yellow card) 51' (yellow-red card) 63'; D. Ďuriš (yellow card) 68'; Gidi (yellow card) 69'	Stadium: Miejski Stadion Piłkarski Raków; Attendance: 5,240; Referee: Fabio Verissimo (Portugal); Assistant referees: Pedro Martins (Portugal), Hugo Marques (Portugal); Fourth official: David Rafael Oliveira Da Silva (Portugal)

31 July 2025 Second leg	Žilina (Slovakia)	1–3 (1–6 agg.)	(Poland) Raków Częstochowa	Žilina, Slovakia
20:30 CEST (UTC+2)	D. Ďuriš 13'; Kuciak (yellow card) 27' (not on pitch); Roginić (yellow card) 80'	Report	Makuch 37'; Repka (yellow card) 51'; Brunes 52'; Diaby-Fadiga 72'	Stadium: Štadión pod Dubňom; Attendance: 4,229; Referee: Genc Nuza (Kosovo); Assistant referees: Fatlum Berisha (Kosovo), Bujar Selimaj (Kosovo); Fourth official: Dardan Çaka (Kosovo)
Note: Raków Częstochowa won 6–1 on aggregate.
