= 2026 Slovak Cup final =

Football match

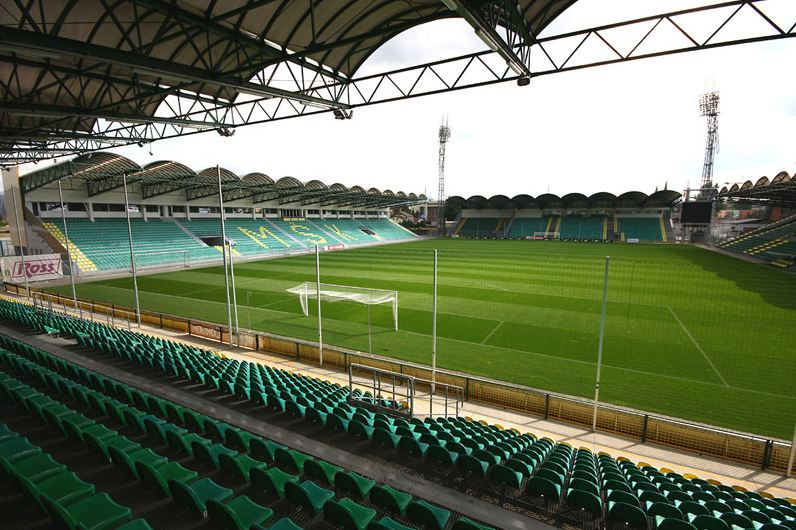
- Štadión pod Dubňom in Žilina held the final
- Event: Slovak Cup final
MŠK Žilina	FC Košice
3	1
- Date: 1 May 2026
- Venue: Štadión pod Dubňom, Žilina
- Referee: Peter Kráľovič
- Attendance: 9,723

The 2026 Slovak Cup final (known as the Slovnaft Cup for sponsorship reasons) was the final match of the 2025–26 Slovak Cup, the 57th season of the top cup competition in Slovak football. The match was played on 1 May 2026.

It was contested by MŠK Žilina and FC Košice. The match ended in a 3–1 victory for Žilina, winning their first trophy in several years. As winners, they qualified for the first qualifying round of the 2026–27 UEFA Europa League. Filip Kaša scored the winning goal.

== Route to the final ==
Note: In all results below, the score of the finalist is given first (H: home; A: away; N: neutral venue).

MŠK Žilina (1)		Round	FC Košice (1)
Opponent	Result	2025–26 Slovak Cup	Opponent	Result
Bye		Preliminary round	Bye
Bye		First round	Bye
Spartak Vysoká nad Kysucou (6)	7–1 (A)	Second round	Slovan Kendice (4)	5–0 (A)
TJ Sokol Zubrohlava (6)	8–0 (A)	Third round	MŠK Spišské Podhradie (3)	7–1 (A)
MŠK Senec (3)	1–0 (A)	Fourth round	ViOn Zlaté Moravce (2)	4–2 (A)
MFK Skalica (1)	3–1 (H)	Round of 16	MFK Ružomberok (1)	4–2 (A)
AS Trenčín (1)	3–0 (H)	Quarter-finals	DAC Dunajská Streda (1)	4–0 (A)
FK Železiarne Podbrezová	2–0 (H) 1–1 (A) (3–1 agg.)	Semi-finals	Tatran Prešov (1)	2–2 (A), 2–1 (a.e.t) (H) (3–2 agg.)

== Match ==
=== Background ===
On 6 September 2025, it was announced that the final of the 2025–26 Slovak Cup would be held in the Štadión pod Dubňom. It would be the second time that it would host a final, with the first being in the 2007–08 season when Artmedia Petržalka beat Spartak Trnava 1–0 following a goal from Zbyněk Pospěch in extra time.

The final saw Žilina play in their first major cup final since the 2021 final, which they lost against Slovan Bratislava, and seek their first major trophy under the management of Pavol Staňo. The šošoni were considered to be the favorites of the match, having already beaten Košice 4–1 earlier in the season and drawing 2–2 away from home.

=== Summary ===
==== First half ====
At the start of the game, Košice had two chances by the penalty area at the right wing. The first goal came after 20 minutes when Patrik Iľko's attempt was saved by Matúš Kira. The Košice defenders stopped him from getting the ball, but shortly after, Kristián Bari sprinted past and tucked the ball into the net from in front of the open goal, with former Košice player Michal Faško scoring. In the last few minutes of the first half, Filip Kaša scored a header following a cross from Timotej Hranica.

==== Second half ====
10 minutes after the break, Žilina were able to increase their lead to 3–0, following a goal scored by Marko Roginić who was assisted by Faško. Around the hour mark, Iľko had a shot which hit the crossbar. Shortly afterward, referee Kráľovič paused the match due to pyrotechnics in the Košice fans' section. Osman Kakay would make a goal-line clearance following a mistake by goalkeeper Kira. Following a cleared corner kick in additional time, Košice were able to counter, with Karlo Miljanić scoring.

=== Details ===
1 May 2026
16:00 CEST (UTC+2)

Žilina	3–1	Košice
Faško 16'; Kaša 40'; Roginić 50'	Report	Miljanić 90'

Štadión pod Dubňom, Žilina
Attendance: 9,723
Referee: Peter Kráľovič

GK	1	(Slovakia) Jakub Badžgoň
CB	17	(Slovakia) Ján Minárik
CB	25	(Czech Republic) Filip Kaša
CB	32	(Georgia (country)) Aleksandre Narimanidze
RM	21	(Slovakia) Timotej Hranica		(substituted off) 83'
CM	66	(Slovakia) Miroslav Káčer		(substituted off) 79'
CM	11	(Poland) Fabian Bzdyl
LM	20	(Slovakia) Kristián Bari
RW	14	(Slovakia) Michal Faško		(substituted off) 90+1'
CF	16	(Slovakia) Patrik Iľko		(substituted off) 79'
LW	95	(Croatia) Marko Roginić	(yellow card) 88'	(substituted off) 90+1'
Substitutes:
GK	29	(Czech Republic) Dominik Sváček
DF	2	(Slovakia) Marek Okál
MF	6	(Cameroon) Xavier Adang		(substituted on) 79'
MF	8	(Hungary) Regő Szánthó		(substituted on) 79'
MF	10	(Romania) Andrei Florea
DF	14	(Slovakia) Michal Svoboda
DF	33	(Slovakia) Tobiáš Pališčák		(substituted on) 84'
FW	34	(Slovakia) Lukáš Prokop		(substituted on) 90+1'
FW	39	(Czech Republic) Lukáš Juliš		(substituted on) 90+1'
Manager:
(Slovakia) Pavol Staňo

GK	22	(Slovakia) Matúš Kira
CB	26	(Slovakia) Sebastian Kóša
CB	20	(Slovakia) Ján Krivák		(substituted off) 45'
CB	24	(Slovakia) Dominik Kružliak		(substituted off) 45'
RM	17	(Hungary) Mátyás Kovács
CM	6	(Slovakia) Filip Lichý
CM	8	(Slovakia) Dávid Gallovič
LM	23	(Slovakia) Matej Madleňák	(yellow card) 33'	(substituted off) 83'
RW	15	(Slovakia) Miroslav Sovič		(substituted off) 62'
CF	9	(Slovakia) Roman Čerepkai
LW	77	(Slovakia) Milan Rehuš		(substituted off) 67'
Substitutes:
GK	98	(Poland) Kevin Dąbrowski
MF	7	(Slovakia) Milan Dimun	(yellow card) 88'	(substituted on) 62'
DF	18	(Slovakia) Tomáš Ďurko
MF	19	(Slovakia) Milan Polča
DF	21	(Slovakia) Daniel Magda		(substituted on) 46'
FW	27	(Croatia) Karlo Miljanić		(substituted on) 67'
DF	29	(Sierra Leone) Osman Kakay		(substituted on) 46'
DF	31	(Austria) Emilian Metu
DF	47	(Austria) Leonardo Lukačević		(substituted on) 83'
Manager:
(Slovakia) Peter Černák

Assistant referees:
Milan Štrbo
Matej Zemko
Fourth official:
Martin Dohál
Video assistant referee:
Ivan Kružliak
Assistant video assistant referee:
Igor Valent

Match rules

- 90 minutes.
- 30 minutes of extra time if necessary.
- Penalty shoot-out if scores still level.

== Post-match ==
=== Reaction ===
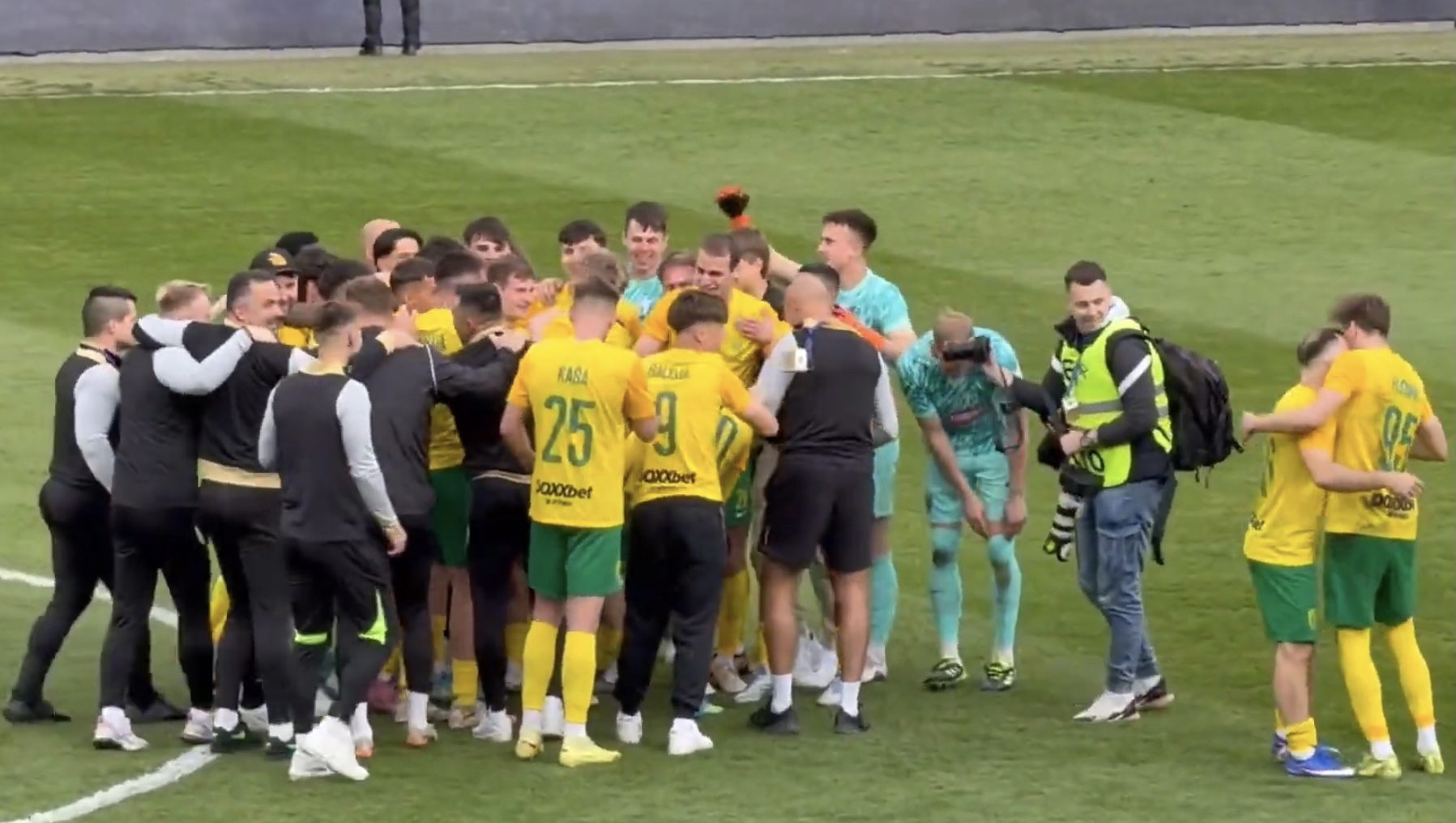
Žilina players celebrating their win

MŠK Žilina reclaimed the Slovak Cup for the first time in 13 years since their 3–2 triumph in the 2012 final against FK Senica. On the other hand, this denied Košice their first trophy since their re-founding in 2018. It was the first trophy that Pavol Staňo won as a coach.

Following the match, it was reported that Košice fans had rioted in the city.
