= 2026–27 Slovak First Football League =

Football league in Slovakia

Niké liga
- Season: 2026–27
- Dates: Regular season: 25–26 July 2026– May 2027
- Matches: 84
- Goals: 275 (3.27 per match)
- Top goalscorer: Ammar Ramadan (10)
- All statistics correct as of 8 November 2026.

The 2026–27 Slovak First Football League (known as Niké liga for sponsorship reasons) is the 34th season of first-tier football league in Slovakia since its establishment in 1993. The season started on 25–26 July 2026 and end in May 2027. There will be no fixtures between 13 December 2026 and 7 February 2027.

== Summary ==
=== Developments ===
On 14 November 2025, a decision was made by the Presidium of the Union of League Clubs, approving the schedule for the 2026–27 season. The competition model will remain unchanged, and the season will take place in the same span of the autumn and spring parts for the fifth time. The last autumn round will take place on December 12 and 13, 2026, following a break until February 2027. The eighth round of the league will start a day earlier, on 30 April 2027 due to the final of the Slovak Cup being scheduled for 1 May 2027.

== Teams ==
The league consisted of twelve teams; the top eleven teams of the previous season, and one team promoted from the 2. Liga. Slovan Bratislava entered the season as defending champions (for the eighth consecutive season).

The promoted team was the 2025–26 2. Liga champions Dukla Banská Bystrica (returning to the Slovak First Football League after a single-season absence). They replaced the 2025–26 Slovak First Football League bottom-placed team Tatran Prešov (relegated from the Slovak First Football League after a single season).

=== Stadiums and locations ===
Location of teams in 2026–27 season

Team	Location	Stadium	Capacity
DAC Dunajská Streda	Dunajská Streda	DAC Aréna	12,700
Dukla Banská Bystrica	Banská Bystrica	Národný Atletický Štadión	7,831
Komárno	Komárno	ViOn Aréna	4,008
Košice	Košice	Košická futbalová aréna	12,555
Podbrezová	Podbrezová	ZELPO Aréna	4,061
Ružomberok	Ružomberok	Štadión pod Čebraťom	4,876
Skalica	Skalica	Mestský štadión Skalica	2,494
Slovan Bratislava	Bratislava	Tehelné pole	22,500
Spartak Trnava	Trnava	Anton Malatinský Stadium	19,000
Trenčín	Trenčín	Štadión Sihoť	10,000
Zemplín Michalovce	Michalovce	Mestský futbalový štadión	4,400
Žilina	Žilina	Štadión pod Dubňom	10,897

FC DAC 1904 Dunajská Streda	Banská Bystrica	FC Košice	FK Železiarne Podbrezová
MOL Aréna; UEFA	Národný Atletický Štadión; UEFA	Košická futbalová aréna UEFA	ZELPO Aréna; UEFA
Capacity: 12,700	Capacity: 7,381	Capacity: 12,555	Capacity: 4,000
MFK Ružomberok	MFK Skalica	ŠK Slovan Bratislava	FC Spartak Trnava
Štadión pod Čebraťom	Štadión MFK Skalica	Tehelné pole UEFA	Štadión Antona Malatinského; UEFA
Capacity: 4,876	Capacity: 2,600	Capacity: 22,500	Capacity: 18,200
AS Trenčín	MFK Zemplín Michalovce	KFC Komárno	MŠK Žilina
Štadión Sihoť; UEFA	Mestský futbalový štadión UEFA	Mestský štadión Komárno; UEFA	Štadión pod Dubňom; UEFA
Capacity: 10,000	Capacity: 4,400	Capacity: 5,500	Capacity: 10,897

=== Personnel and kits ===
Team	President	Manager	Captain	Kit manufacturer	Shirt sponsor
DAC Dunajská Streda	(Slovakia) Tibor Végh	(Germany) Robert Klauß	(Ukraine) Taras Kacharaba	Macron	Kukkonia
Banská Bystrica	(Slovakia) Milan Smädo	(Slovakia) Daniel Valach	(Slovakia) TBA	Adidas	Veolia
Košice	(Slovakia) Dušan Trnka	(Slovakia) Peter Černák	(Slovakia) Ján Krivák	Adidas	Niké
Podbrezová	(Slovakia) Július Kriváň	(Slovakia) Boris Godál	(Slovakia) Samuel Štefánik	Adidas	Niké
Ružomberok	(Slovakia) Ľubomír Golis	(Czech Republic) Michal Ščasný	(Czech Republic) Jan Hladík	Adidas	Niké
Skalica	(Slovakia) Peter Bartoš	(Slovakia) Stanislav Macek	(Slovakia) Oliver Podhorín	Adidas	Tipsport
Slovan Bratislava	(Slovakia) Ivan Kmotrík	(Ivory Coast) Yaya Touré	(Slovenia) Andraž Šporar	Adidas	Niké
Spartak Trnava	(Slovakia) Peter Macho	(Spain) Antonio Muñoz	(Slovakia) Martin Mikovič	Puma	Tipsport
Trenčín	(Slovakia) Róbert Rybníček	(Slovakia) Marek Ďanovský	(Serbia) Andrija Katić	Macron	Tipsport
Zemplín Michalovce	(Slovakia) Ján Sabol	(Slovakia) Anton Šoltis	(Slovakia) Lukáš Pauschek	Adidas	Tipsport
Komárno	(Slovakia) Juraj Baráth	(Slovakia) Pavol Gregora	(Slovakia) Martin Šimko	Adidas	MOL
Žilina	(Slovakia) Jozef Antošík	(Slovakia) Vladimír Veselý	(Slovakia) Miroslav Káčer	Nike	RADOMA

=== Managerial changes ===
Team	Outgoing manager	Manner of departure	Date of vacancy	Position in table	Replaced by	Date of appointment
Slovan Bratislava	(Slovakia) Vladimír Weiss	Signed with Slovakia	12 May 2026	Pre-season	(Ivory Coast) Yaya Touré	5 June 2026
DAC Dunajská Streda	(Slovakia) Branislav Fodrek	Sacked	3 June 2026	Pre-season	(Germany) Robert Klauß	5 June 2026
Banská Bystrica	(Slovakia) Juraj Jarábek	Sacked	10 August 2026	12	(Slovakia) Daniel Valach	10 August 2026
MŠK Žilina	(Slovakia) Pavol Staňo	Sacked	12 August 2026	6	(Slovakia) Vladimír Veselý	12 August 2026
MFK Skalica	(Slovakia) Roman Hudec	Sacked	15 September 2026	8	(Slovakia) Stanislav Macek	22 September 2026
AS Trenčín	(Netherlands) Ricardo Moniz	Sacked	11 October 2026	10	(Slovakia) Marek Ďanovský	14 October 2026
KFC Komárno	(Slovakia) Norbert Czibor	Sacked	20 October 2026	11	(Slovakia) Pavol Gregora	20 October 2026
Podbrezová	(Slovakia) Štefan Markulík	Sacked	23 October 2026	7	(Slovakia) Boris Godál (interim)	23 October 2026
Ružomberok	(Czech Republic) Jaroslav Köstl	Sacked	10 November 2026	10	(Czech Republic) Michal Ščasný	11 November 2026

== Regular stage ==
=== League table ===
Pos	Team	Pld	W	D	L	GF	GA	GD	Pts	Qualification
1	DAC Dunajská Streda (Q)	15	13	2	0	45	9	+36	41	Qualification for the championship group
2	Slovan Bratislava	15	9	4	2	33	15	+18	31	Qualification for the championship group
3	Žilina	15	9	4	2	39	27	+12	31	Qualification for the championship group
4	Spartak Trnava	15	8	4	3	29	18	+11	28	Qualification for the championship group
5	Podbrezová	15	6	3	6	25	26	−1	21	Qualification for the championship group
6	Košice	15	4	7	4	33	27	+6	19	Qualification for the championship group
7	Zemplín Michalovce	15	4	2	9	12	26	−14	14	Qualification for the relegation group
8	Dukla Banská Bystrica	15	4	2	9	14	29	−15	14	Qualification for the relegation group
9	Komárno	15	2	7	6	13	20	−7	13	Qualification for the relegation group
10	Ružomberok	15	3	3	9	13	30	−17	12	Qualification for the relegation group
11	Trenčín	15	2	5	8	16	32	−16	11	Qualification for the relegation group
12	Skalica	15	2	5	8	16	29	−13	11	Qualification for the relegation group

Updated to match(es) played on 22 November 2026. Source: Niké liga (in Slovak)
Rules for classification: 1) Points; 2) Head-to-head points; 3) Head-to-head goal difference; 4) Head-to-head away goals scored; 5) Play-off.
(Q) Qualified for the phase indicated

=== Results ===
Each team plays home-and-away against every other team in the league, for a total of 22 matches each.

Home \ Away	DAC	DBB	KOM	KOŠ	POD	RUŽ	SKA	SLO	SPA	TRE	ZMI	ŽIL
DAC Dunajská Streda		2–0	3–0	3–2	5–0	5–0		2–0	2–2			
Dukla Banská Bystrica	0–2		2–2		1–0		3–2	0–4	1–2			3–4
Komárno	0–3					0–1	0–0	1–2	1–2	0–0	2–0	
Košice	0–1	3–0	1–1			2–0	1–1	1–2		3–3		2–2
Podbrezová			1–1	2–2		4–1		1–2	1–3	2–1	2–0	
Ružomberok	1–1	0–1			1–4		1–0	0–1	1–1		3–0	2–2
Skalica	1–6			2–4	0–1	2–1		1–1	1–1	0–2		2–4
Slovan Bratislava		2–2			3–0	5–0			a	2–2	1–2	3–3
Spartak Trnava		3–0	1–2	5–2			1–1	0–3			2–0	1–3
Trenčín	1–4	0–1	1–1	0–5	2–2	2–1		0–2	0–4			
Zemplín Michalovce	0–3	1–0	1–1	1–1	1–4		2–0		0–1	3–1		0–1
Žilina	2–3	2–0	2–1	4–4	3–1		1–3			2–1	4–1	

Updated to match(es) played on 22 November 2026. Source: Niké liga (in Slovak)
Legend: Blue = home team win; Yellow = draw; Red = away team win.

=== Top goalscorers ===
As of 8 November 2026

Rank	Player	Club	Goals
1	(Syria) Ammar Ramadan	DAC Dunajska Streda	10
2	(Slovakia) Matej Trusa	DAC Dunajska Streda	9
2	(Montenegro) Aleksa Maraš	Košice	9
2	(Slovakia) Michal Faško	Žilina	9
5	(Slovakia) Timotej Kudlička	Trnava	8
6	(Slovakia) Martin Chrien	Podbrezová	6
7	(Cape Verde) Eynel Soares	Trenčín	5
7	(Georgia (country)) Giorgi Gagua	DAC Dunajska Streda	5
7	(Ghana) Rahim Ibrahim	Slovan	5
7	(Slovenia) Andraž Šporar	Slovan	5

=== Clean sheets ===
As of 8 Nov 2026

Rank	Player	Club	Clean sheets
1	(Brazil) Leandro Filipe De Almeida	Dunajska Streda	8
2	(Slovakia) Martin Vantruba	Trnava	3
2	(Serbia) Aleksandar Popović	Slovan Bratislava	3
2	(Slovakia) Lukáš Hroššo	B.Bystrica	3
2	(Slovakia) Matúš Kira	Košice	3
2	(Slovakia) Branislav Pindroch	Komárno	3
7	(Slovakia) Dominik Takáč	Slovan Bratislava	2
7	(Slovakia) Adam Jakubech	Michalovce	2
7	(Slovakia) Ivan Krajčírik	Ružomberok	2
7	(Serbia) Andrija Katić	Trenčín	2

==== Player ====
- Most yellow cards: 10
  - Ammar Ramadan (DAC)
- Most red cards: 2
  - Martin Koscelník (Michalovce)
  - Enzo Arevalo (Michalovce)

==== Club ====
- Most yellow cards: 42
  - Dunajská Streda
- Most red cards: 4
  - B.Bystrica
  - Michalovce

== See also ==
- 2026–27 Slovak Cup
- 2026–27 2. Liga (Slovakia)
- List of Slovak football transfers summer 2026
- List of foreign Slovak First League players
