= 2025–26 Slovak First Football League =

Football league in Slovakia

Niké liga
- Season: 2025–26
- Dates: Regular season: 26 July 2025 – 16 May 2026
- Champions: Slovan Bratislava (24th title)
- Relegated: Tatran Prešov
- Champions League: Slovan Bratislava
- Europa League: Žilina
- Conference League: DAC Dunajská Streda; Spartak Trnava
- Matches: 192
- Goals: 542 (2.82 per match)
- Top goalscorer: Michal Faško (14)
- Highest attendance: 17,011; Spartak Trnava 0-2 Slovan (18 Oct 2025)
- Lowest attendance: 230; Komárno 1-0 Podbrezová (11 Nov 2025)
- Average attendance: ▲3025
- All statistics correct as of 15 February 2026.

The 2025–26 Slovak First Football League (known as Niké liga for sponsorship reasons) was the 33rd season of first-tier football league in Slovakia since its establishment in 1993.

== Teams ==
The league consisted of twelve teams; the top eleven teams from the previous season, and one team promoted from the 2. Liga. Slovan Bratislava entered the season as defending champions (for the seventh successive season).

The promoted team was the 2024–25 2. Liga champions Tatran Prešov (returning to the Slovak First Football League after a seven-season absence). They replaced the 2024–25 Slovak First Football League bottom-placed team Banská Bystrica (relegated after three years in the top-flight).

=== Stadiums and locations ===
Location of clubs in Slovakia for the 2025–26 season

FC DAC 1904 Dunajská Streda	Tatran Prešov	FC Košice	FK Železiarne Podbrezová
MOL Aréna; UEFA	Futbal Tatran Arena; UEFA	Košická futbalová aréna UEFA	ZELPO Aréna; UEFA
Capacity: 12,700	Capacity: 6,500	Capacity: 12,555	Capacity: 4,000
MFK Ružomberok	MFK Skalica	ŠK Slovan Bratislava	FC Spartak Trnava
Štadión pod Čebraťom	Štadión MFK Skalica	Tehelné pole UEFA	Štadión Antona Malatinského; UEFA
Capacity: 4,876	Capacity: 2,600	Capacity: 22,500	Capacity: 18,200
AS Trenčín	MFK Zemplín Michalovce	KFC Komárno	MŠK Žilina
Štadión Sihoť; UEFA	Mestský futbalový štadión UEFA	ViOn Aréna; UEFA	Štadión pod Dubňom; UEFA
Capacity: 10,000	Capacity: 4,400	Capacity: 4,008	Capacity: 10,897

=== Personnel and kits ===
Team	President	Manager	Captain	Kit manufacturer	Shirt sponsor
DAC Dunajská Streda	(Slovakia) Tibor Végh	(Slovakia) Branislav Fodrek	(Ukraine) Taras Kacharaba	Macron	Kukkonia
Tatran Prešov	(Slovakia) Ľuboš Micheľ	(Slovakia) Erik Havrila	(Slovakia) Patrik Šimko	Adidas	Niké
Košice	(Slovakia) Dušan Trnka	(Slovakia) Peter Černák	(Slovakia) Ján Krivák	Adidas	Niké
Podbrezová	(Slovakia) Július Kriváň	(Slovakia) Štefan Markulík	(Slovakia) Samuel Štefánik	Adidas	Niké
Ružomberok	(Slovakia) Ľubomír Golis	(Czech Republic) Jaroslav Köstl	(Czech Republic) Jan Hladík	Adidas	Niké
Skalica	(Slovakia) Peter Bartoš	(Slovakia) Roman Hudec	(Slovakia) Oliver Podhorín	Adidas	Tipsport
Slovan Bratislava	(Slovakia) Ivan Kmotrík	(Slovakia) Vladimír Weiss	(Slovakia) Vladimír Weiss	Adidas	Niké
Spartak Trnava	(Slovakia) Peter Macho	(Spain) Antonio Muñoz	(Slovakia) Martin Mikovič	Puma	Tipsport
Trenčín	(Slovakia) Róbert Rybníček	(Netherlands) Ricardo Moniz	(Northern Ireland) Sean Goss	Macron	Tipsport
Zemplín Michalovce	(Slovakia) Ján Sabol	(Slovakia) Anton Šoltis	(Slovakia) Lukáš Pauschek	Adidas	Tipsport
Komárno	(Slovakia) Juraj Baráth	(Slovakia) Norbert Czibor	(Slovakia) Martin Šimko	Adidas	MOL
Žilina	(Slovakia) Jozef Antošík	(Slovakia) Pavol Staňo	(Slovakia) Miroslav Káčer	Nike	Preto

=== Managerial changes ===
Team	Outgoing manager	Manner of departure	Date of vacancy	Position in table	Replaced by	Date of appointment
Trenčín	(Slovakia) Ivan Galád	End of contract	10 June 2025	Pre-season	(Netherlands) Ricardo Moniz	10 June 2026
MŠK Žilina	(Czech Republic) Michal Ščasný	Signed by Spartak Trnava	6 June 2024	Pre-season	(Czech Republic) Petr Ruman	6 June 2026
Spartak Trnava	(Slovakia) Michal Gašparík	Signed by Górnik Zabrze	6 June 2025	Pre-season	(Czech Republic) Michal Ščasný	6 June 2025
Tatran Prešov	(Czech Republic) Jaroslav Hynek	Sacked	31 August 2025	10th	(Slovakia) Vladimír Cifranič	3 September 2025
FC Košice	(Czech Republic) Roman Skuhravý	Sacked	2 October 2025	12th	(Czech Republic) František Straka	8 October 2025
FC Košice	(Czech Republic) František Straka	Sacked	11 November 2025	12th	(Slovakia) Peter Černák	11 November 2025
Spartak Trnava	(Czech Republic) Michal Ščasný	Sacked	18 November 2025	4th	(Slovakia) Martin Škrtel (caretaker)	18 November 2025
MFK Skalica	(Czech Republic) David Oulehla	Sacked	30 November 2025	11th	(Slovakia) Roman Hudec	1 December 2025
Spartak Trnava	(Slovakia) Martin Škrtel	End of interim spell	5 January 2026	3rd	(Spain) Antonio Muñoz	5 January 2025
Ružomberok	(Czech Republic) Ondřej Smetana	Sacked	12 January 2026	7th	(Czech Republic) Jaroslav Köstl	13 January 2026
Tatran Prešov	(Czech Republic) Vladimír Cifranič	Sacked	31 August 2025	10th	(Slovakia) Jozef Kostelník	3 March 2029
Tatran Prešov	(Slovakia) Jozef Kostelník	Sacked	24 March 2025	11th	(Slovakia) Erik Havrila	24 March 2025
KFC Komárno	(Slovakia) Mikuláš Radványi	Sacked	25 April 2026	11th	(Slovakia) Norbert Czibor	27 April 2026

== Regular stage ==
=== League table ===
Pos	Team	Pld	W	D	L	GF	GA	GD	Pts	Qualification
1	Slovan Bratislava	22	14	4	4	47	30	+17	46	Qualification for the championship group
2	DAC Dunajská Streda	22	12	7	3	39	20	+19	43	Qualification for the championship group
3	Žilina	22	11	7	4	45	27	+18	40	Qualification for the championship group
4	Spartak Trnava	22	11	4	7	35	28	+7	37	Qualification for the championship group
5	Podbrezová	22	11	3	8	46	29	+17	36	Qualification for the championship group
6	Zemplín Michalovce	22	8	5	9	32	36	−4	29	Qualification for the championship group
7	Ružomberok	22	6	7	9	24	34	−10	25	Qualification for the relegation group
8	Trenčín	22	7	3	12	18	37	−19	24 (Note: Ranked by head-to-head points: Trenčín 6, Košice 0.)	Qualification for the relegation group
9	Košice	22	7	3	12	35	42	−7	24	Qualification for the relegation group
10	Komárno	22	5	7	10	24	34	−10	22	Qualification for the relegation group
11	Tatran Prešov	22	4	9	9	22	35	−13	21	Qualification for the relegation group
12	Skalica	22	3	7	12	20	35	−15	16	Qualification for the relegation group

Source: Niké liga (in Slovak)
Rules for classification: 1) Points; 2) Head-to-head points; 3) Head-to-head goal difference; 4) Head-to-head away goals scored; 5) Play-off.

=== Results ===
Each team plays home-and-away against every other team in the league, for a total of 22 matches each.

Home \ Away	DAC	KOM	KOŠ	POD	RUŽ	SKA	SLO	TRN	TAT	TRE	ZMI	ŽIL
DAC Dunajská Streda		1–1	3–1	2–0	2–0	3–2	0–3	3–1	0–0	4–1	1–1	1–2
Komárno	2–2		1–2	1–0	1–1	1–0	2–3	1–4	0–0	1–2	1–1	1–3
Košice	0–2	2–3		2–4	3–1	3–1	2–0	1–2	2–2	0–1	3–2	2–2
Podbrezová	0–1	2–1	3–1		5–0	2–0	1–3	1–3	4–1	2–0	2–0	2–0
Ružomberok	0–1	0–1	1–1	1–0		1–3	2–2	1–1	1–0	0–0	0–1	3–3
Skalica	1–1	1–1	1–0	2–2	0–0		0–1	0–4	2–2	0–1	2–1	0–0
Slovan Bratislava	3–2	3–2	3–2	4–1	1–2	1–0		4–0	0–1	0–2	3–2	3–2
Spartak Trnava	0–3	2–0	3–1	0–5	3–0	2–0	0–2		1–0	4–0	0–1	0–0
Tatran Prešov	0–0	1–1	1–4	2–2	1–3	3–2	2–2	2–1		2–3	0–1	0–4
Trenčín	0–3	0–1	2–0	0–4	0–3	1–1	1–2	0–1	0–0		1–2	2–1
Zemplín Michalovce	2–4	3–1	0–2	0–4	4–2	2–0	1–1	1–1	1–2	2–0		2–4
Žilina	0–0	1–0	4–1	3–0	1–2	3–2	3–3	2–2	1–0	4–1	2–0	

Source: Niké liga (in Slovak)
Legend: Blue = home team win; Yellow = draw; Red = away team win.

== Championship group ==
Pos	Team	Pld	W	D	L	GF	GA	GD	Pts	Qualification	SLO	DAC	TRN	ŽIL	ZMI	POD
1	Slovan Bratislava (C)	32	21	5	6	62	37	+25	68	Qualification for the Champions League second qualifying round (Note: Slovan Bratislava was promoted to the Champions League second qualifying round as one of the two champions with the highest coefficient in Champions League first qualifying round, due to Champions League re-balancing.)	—	1–0	2–2	0–1	0–2	2–0
2	DAC Dunajská Streda	32	17	7	8	55	34	+21	58	Qualification for the Conference League second qualifying round	0–3	—	3–0	3–1	3–0	2–1
3	Spartak Trnava	32	17	5	10	51	37	+14	56	Qualification for the Conference League second qualifying round	0–1	2–1	—	1–0	3–0	4–1
4	Žilina	32	15	7	10	59	41	+18	52	Qualification for the Europa League first qualifying round (Note: Žilina qualified for the Europa League first qualifying round as the 2025–26 Slovak Cup winners.)	0–1	3–1	0–1	—	3–2	0–2
5	Zemplín Michalovce	32	13	5	14	44	52	−8	44		1–3	2–1	1–0	2–1	—	1–2
6	Podbrezová	32	13	3	16	55	51	+4	42		1–2	1–2	0–3	1–5	0–1	—

Source: Niké liga (in Slovak)
Rules for classification: 1) Points; 2) Points in regular season; 3) Head-to-head points in regular season; 4) Head-to-head goal difference in regular season; 5) Head-to-head goals scored in regular season; 6) Head-to-head away goals scored in regular season (if two teams tied); 7) Goal difference; 8) Goals scored; 9) Fair play ranking; 10) Drawing of lots.
(C) Champions

== Relegation group ==
Pos	Team	Pld	W	D	L	GF	GA	GD	Pts	Qualification or relegation	KOŠ	TRE	SKA	RUŽ	KOM	TAT
7	Košice	32	13	4	15	51	55	−4	43		—	2–0	2–0	3–1	2–1	2–1
8	Trenčín	32	13	3	16	34	51	−17	42		3–0	—	2–1	3–1	1–2	1–0
9	Skalica	32	9	8	15	34	45	−11	35		3–1	4–1	—	1–0	2–1	1–0
10	Ružomberok	32	8	11	13	34	50	−16	35		1–1	4–3	0–0	—	2–1	1–1
11	Komárno (O)	32	8	8	16	34	46	−12	32	Qualification for the relegation play-offs	1–2	0–1	0–2	3–0	—	1–0
12	Tatran Prešov (R)	32	6	12	14	29	43	−14	30	Relegation to the 2. Liga	2–1	0–1	3–0	0–0	0–0	—

Source: Niké liga (in Slovak)
Rules for classification: 1) Points; 2) Points in regular season; 3) Head-to-head points in regular season; 4) Head-to-head goal difference in regular season; 5) Head-to-head goals scored in regular season; 6) Head-to-head away goals scored in regular season (if two teams tied); 7) Goal difference; 8) Goals scored; 9) Fair play ranking; 10) Drawing of lots.
(O) Play-off winners; (R) Relegated

== Relegation play-offs ==
The 11th-placed team (Komárno) faced the 2nd-placed team of the 2025–26 2. Liga (Zvolen) in a two-legged play-off for the final place in the 2026–27 Slovak First Football League.

First leg

19 May 2026
15:30 CEST (UTC+02:00)

Zvolen	1–0	Komárno
Sylvestr 28'	Report

Futbal Aréna Zvolen, Zvolen
Attendance: 1,856
Referee: Filip Glova

Second leg

23 May 2026
19:30 CEST (UTC+02:00)

Komárno	3–0	Zvolen
Rudzan 43', 49'; Ganbold 71'	Report

ViOn Aréna, Zlaté Moravce
Attendance: 1,344
Referee: Peter Ziemba

== Season statistics ==
=== Top goalscorers ===
As of 17 May 2026

Rank	Player	Club	Goals
1	(Slovakia) Michal Faško	Žilina	14
2	(Czech Republic) Radek Šiler	Podbrezová	13
3	(Slovenia) Andraž Šporar	Slovan Bratislava	12
4	(Syria) Ammar Ramadan	Dunajská Streda	11
4	(Slovakia) Roland Galčík	Podbrezová	11
6	(Slovakia) Roman Čerepkai	Košice	10
6	(Sweden) Hugo Ahl	Michalovce	10
6	(Armenia) Tigran Barseghyan	Slovan Bratislava	10
9	(Montenegro) Viktor Đukanović	Dunajská Streda	9
9	(Nigeria) Cody David	Trenčín	9

==== Hat-tricks ====
Round	Player	For	Against	Result	Date	Ref
6	(Ukraine) Mykola Kukharevych	Slovan Bratislava	Košice	3–2 (H)	31 August 2025	
13	(Nigeria) Abdulrahman Taiwo	Spartak Trnava	Trenčín	4–0 (H)	2 November 2025	
15	(Slovakia) Michal Faško	MŠK Žilina	Trenčín	4–1 (H)	22 November 2025	
19	(Czech Republic) Radek Šiler	Podbrezová	Trenčín	4–0 (A)	7 February 2026	
21	(Syria) Ammar Ramadan	Dunajská Streda	Skalica	3–2 (H)	21 February 2026	
9.RR	(Nigeria) Cody David	AS Trenčín	Ružomberok	4–3 (A)	9 May 2026	

=== Clean sheets ===
As of 17 May 2026

Rank	Player	Club	Clean sheets
1	(Serbia) Aleksandar Popović	Dunajská Streda	9
1	(Serbia) Andrija Katić	Trenčín	9
3	(Slovakia) Dominik Takáč	Slovan Bratislava	8
3	(Slovenia) Žiga Frelih	Trnava	8
3	(Slovakia) Pavol Bajza	Prešov	8
6	(Slovakia) Matej Jurička	Podbrezová	7
6	(Slovakia) Martin Junas	Skalica	7
8	(Slovakia) Patrik Lukáč	Michalovce	6
9	(Slovakia) Benjamín Száraz	Komárno	5
9	(Slovakia) Ľubomír Belko	Žilina	5

=== Discipline ===
As of 17 May 2026

==== Player ====
- Most yellow cards: 11
  - (Slovakia) Vladimír Weiss (Slovan)
- Most red cards: 2
  - (Slovakia) Alexander Mojžiš (Ružomberok)
  - (Nigeria) Suleman Sani (Trenčín)
  - (Slovakia) Peter Pokorný (Slovan)

==== Club ====
- Most yellow cards: 86
  - Spartak Trnava
- Most red cards: 9
  - Spartak Trnava

== Awards ==
=== Annual awards ===
==== Team of the Season ====

Team of the Season was:

- Goalkeeper: (Slovakia) Dominik Takáč (Slovan)
- Defenders: (Panama) César Blackman (Slovan), (Slovenia) Kenan Bajrić (Slovan), (Slovakia) Kristián Bari (Žilina), (Slovenia) Klemen Nemanič (D.Streda)
- Midfielders: (Armenia) Tigran Barseghyan (Slovan), (Slovakia) Michal Faško (Žilina), (Slovakia) Miroslav Káčer (Žilina), (Syria) Ammar Ramadan (D.Streda)
- Forwards: (Slovenia) Andraž Šporar (Slovan), (Slovakia) Roland Galčík (Podbrezová)

Under-21 Team of the Season

- Goalkeeper: (Slovakia) Dominik Ťapaj (Ružomberok)
- Defenders: (Slovakia) Hugo Pavek (Trenčín), (Slovakia) Tobiáš Pališčák (Žilina), (Slovakia) Filip Mielke (Podbrezová), (Czech Republic) Ondřej Deml (Podbrezová)
- Midfielders: (Slovakia) Milan Rehuš (Košice), (Hungary) Máté Tuboly (D.Streda), (Slovakia) Artur Gajdoš (Slovan), (Slovakia) Nino Marcelli (Slovan)
- Forward: (Czech Republic) Radek Šiler (Podbrezová), (Montenegro) Viktor Đukanović (D.Streda)

==== Individual awards ====
Manager of the Season

(Slovakia) Vladimír Weiss (Slovan Bratislava)

Player of the Season

(Slovakia) Michal Faško (MŠK Žilina)

Young Player of the Season

(Slovakia) Milan Rehuš (Košice)

== See also ==
- 2025–26 Slovak Cup
- 2025–26 2. Liga (Slovakia)
- List of Slovak football transfers summer 2025
- List of Slovak football transfers winter_2025-26
- List of foreign Slovak First League players
