= Ľubomír Belko =

Slovak footballer (born 2002)

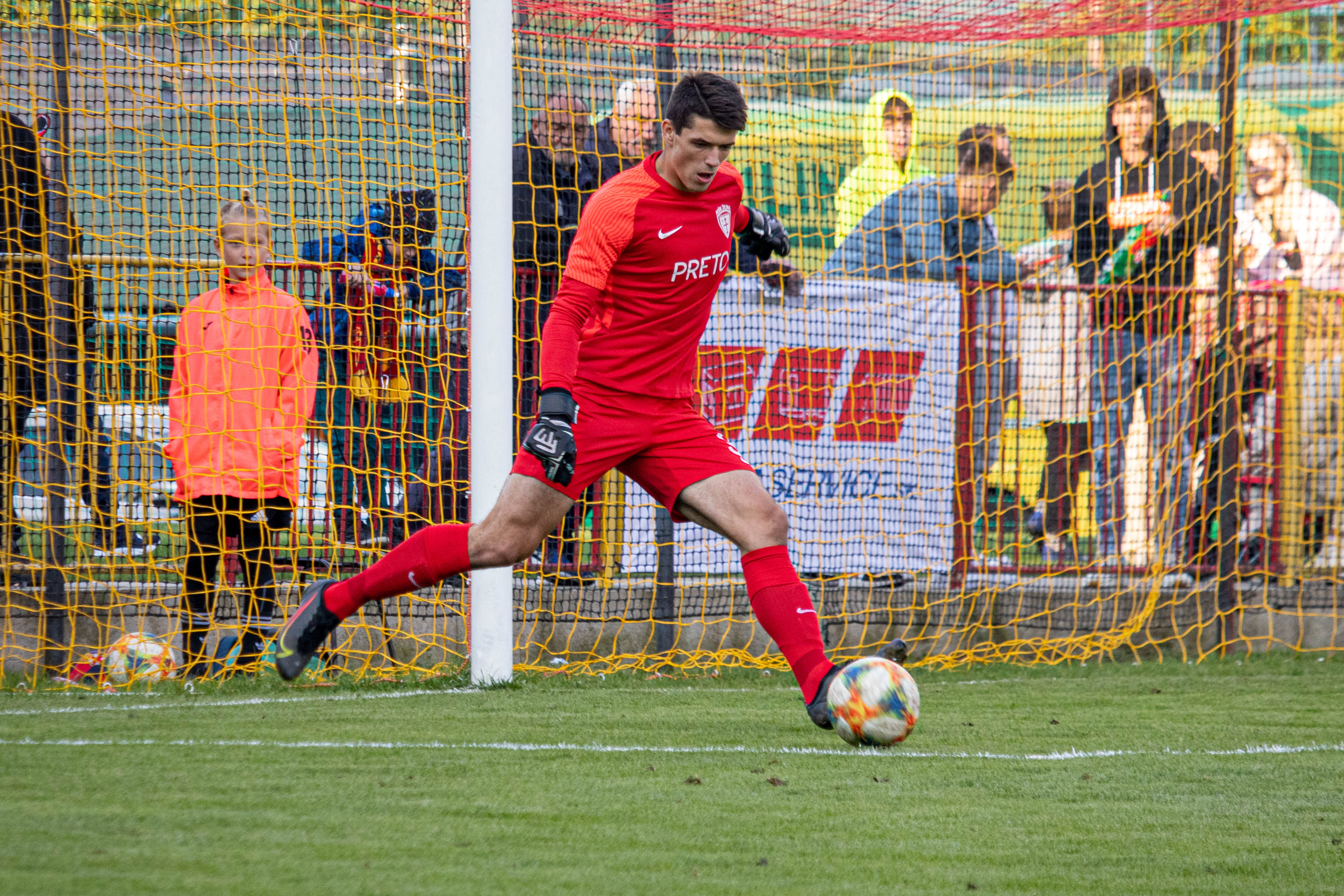
- Belko with Žilina in 2021

Personal information
- Full name: Ľubomír Belko
- Date of birth: 4 February 2002 (age 24)
- Place of birth: Žilina, Slovakia
- Height: 1.92 m (6 ft 4 in)
- Position: Goalkeeper

Team information
- Current team: Viking
- Number: 30

Youth career
- –2013: FK Strečno
- 2013–2020: Žilina

Senior career*
Years	Team	Apps	(Gls)
2019–2021	Žilina B	23	(0)
2020–2025	Žilina	125	(0)
2026–	Viking	9	(0)

International career
2016	Slovakia U15	1	(0)
2017	Slovakia U16	1	(0)
2018–2019	Slovakia U17	6	(0)
2019–2020	Slovakia U18	4	(0)
2021	Slovakia U19	1	(0)
2021–2025	Slovakia U21	20	(0)
- * Club domestic league appearances and goals as of 23 July 2026

Ľubomír Belko (born 4 February 2002) is a Slovak professional footballer who plays as a goalkeeper for Norwegian Eliteserien club Viking.

== Club career ==
=== Žilina ===
Belko made his Fortuna Liga debut for Žilina on 8 August 2021 during a home match against FK Pohronie, in which Šošoni recorded a 3–1 win. Belko conceded the single goal from Ladji Mallé.

=== Viking ===
On 2 February 2026, Belko signed a four-year contract with Norwegian Eliteserien club Viking. On 18 April 2026, he made his Eliteserien debut for Viking in a 3–2 win against Brann.

== International career ==
Belko was first recognised in a senior national team nomination on 23 May 2022 Štefan Tarkovič as an alternate ahead of four UEFA Nations League fixtures against Belarus, Azerbaijan and Kazakhstan. For the same June fixtures, he was also a member of U21 team ahead of a qualifier against Malta and a friendly against Romania. In December 2022, Belko was nominated by Francesco Calzona, who joined the side in late summer, for senior national team prospective players' training camp at NTC Senec.

== Career statistics ==
As of match played 18 April 2026

Appearances and goals by club, season and competition
Club	Season	League			National cup (Note: Includes Slovak Cup, Norwegian Cup)		Continental		Total	
Club	Season	Division	Apps	Goals	Apps	Goals	Apps	Goals	Apps	Goals
Žilina B	2019–20	Slovak Second League	2	0	—		—		2	0
Žilina B	2020–21	Slovak Second League	16	0	—		—		16	0
Žilina B	2021–22	Slovak Second League	5	0	—		—		5	0
Žilina B	Total		23	0	—		—		23	0
Žilina	2020–21	Slovak First League	0	0	5	0	—		5	0
Žilina	2021–22	Slovak First League	19	0	1	0	1 (Note: Appearance(s) in UEFA Conference League)	0	21	0
Žilina	2022–23	Slovak First League	27	0	1	0	—		28	0
Žilina	2023–24	Slovak First League	31	0	1	0	4	0	36	0
Žilina	2024–25	Slovak First League	30	0	0	0	—		30	0
Žilina	2025–26	Slovak First League	18	0	0	0	2	0	20	0
Žilina	Total		125	0	8	0	7	0	140	0
Viking	2026	Eliteserien	1	0	1	0	0	0	2	0
Career total			149	0	9	0	7	0	165	0

== Honours ==
Individual

- Slovak Super Liga Team of the Season: 2022–23
