= Andrei Florea =

Romanian footballer

Personal information
- Full name: Andrei Gabriele Florea
- Date of birth: 30 May 2005 (age 21)
- Place of birth: Rivoli, Italy
- Height: 1.84 m (6 ft 0 in)
- Position: Central midfielder

Team information
- Current team: Žilina
- Number: 10

Youth career
- –2015: Alpignano
- 2015–2025: Juventus
- 2022–2023: → Parma (loan)
- 2025: → Estoril (loan)

Senior career*
Years	Team	Apps	(Gls)
2025	Estoril U23	4	(0)
2025–	Žilina	21	(1)
2025–2026	Žilina B	12	(1)

International career^{‡}
2022	Romania U18	3	(0)
2023–2024	Romania U19	8	(1)
2024	Romania U20	4	(0)
- * Club domestic league appearances and goals as of 19 September 2026 ‡ National team caps and goals as of 19 November 2024

Andrei Gabriele Florea (born 30 May 2005) is a Romanian professional footballer who plays as a central midfielder for Slovak First League club Žilina.

== Career statistics ==
As of 19 September 2026

Appearances and goals by club, season and competition
Club	Season	League			National cup (Note: Includes Taça Revelação, Slovak Cup)		Europe		Other		Total	
Club	Season	Division	Apps	Goals	Apps	Goals	Apps	Goals	Apps	Goals	Apps	Goals
Estoril U23	2024–25	Liga Revelação	4	0	2	0	—		—		6	0
Žilina	2025–26	Slovak First League	12	0	2	0	—		—		14	0
Žilina	2026–27	Slovak First League	9	1	0	0	4 (Note: Two appearances in UEFA Europa League, two appearances in UEFA Conference League)	0	—		13	1
Žilina	Total		21	1	2	0	4	0	—		27	1
Žilina B	2025–26	Slovak Second League	12	1	—		—		—		12	1
Career total			37	2	4	0	4	0	—		45	2

== Honours ==
Žilina

- Slovak Cup: 2025–26
