= Timotej Hranica =

Slovak footballer (born 2005)

Personal information
- Date of birth: 28 May 2005 (age 21)
- Place of birth: Slovakia
- Height: 1.75 m (5 ft 9 in)
- Positions: Right-back; centre-back

Team information
- Current team: Žilina
- Number: 21

Youth career
- 2012–2023: Žilina

Senior career*
Years	Team	Apps	(Gls)
2023–	Žilina B	35	(9)
2024–	Žilina	59	(5)

International career^{‡}
2022	Slovakia U18	3	(0)
2023	Slovakia U19	1	(0)
2024–	Slovakia U21	8	(0)
2025–	Slovakia U20	1	(0)
- * Club domestic league appearances and goals as of 21 September 2026 ‡ National team caps and goals as of 13 January 2026

Timotej Hranica (born 28 May 2005) is a Slovak professional footballer who plays for Slovak First Football League club MŠK Žilina as a defender.

== Club career ==
=== Žilina ===
Hranica joined the youth team of MŠK Žilina in 2012. He was a part of the squad in the Youth League which defeated Pafos 6–0 on aggregate. In the next round they were drawn with Sparta Prague. They drew 2–2 away, and in the home match in Žilina, after a 4–4 draw, a penalty shootout took place, in which Žilina would win.

In 2023, Hranica signed his first professional contract with Žilina. He made his first league debut for Žilina in a 1–1 draw against FC DAC 1904 Dunajská Streda, coming onto the pitch as a substitute in the 79th minute for Antoin Essomba. He scored his first goal for the club in the next season, scoring in the 41st minute of a 5–0 away win against Slovan Bratislava. On 3 September 2025, Hranica signed a three-year extension to his contract with Žilina.

== International career ==
In 2024, Hranica trained with the A-team of the Slovakia national football team before a game against Sweden, but would not play the game. He played for the U21 side in a 3–1 loss against Portugal U21, coming on off the bench in the 72nd minute for Samuel Kopásek. In 2025, Hranica was nominated as a back-up for the Slovakia U21 team ahead of the UEFA European Under-21 Championship in Slovakia. On 18 November 2025, he started in a 2027 UEFA European Under-21 Championship qualifying match against England.

== Honours ==
Žilina

- Slovak Cup: 2025–26
