= František Kóša =

Slovak footballer (born 2006)

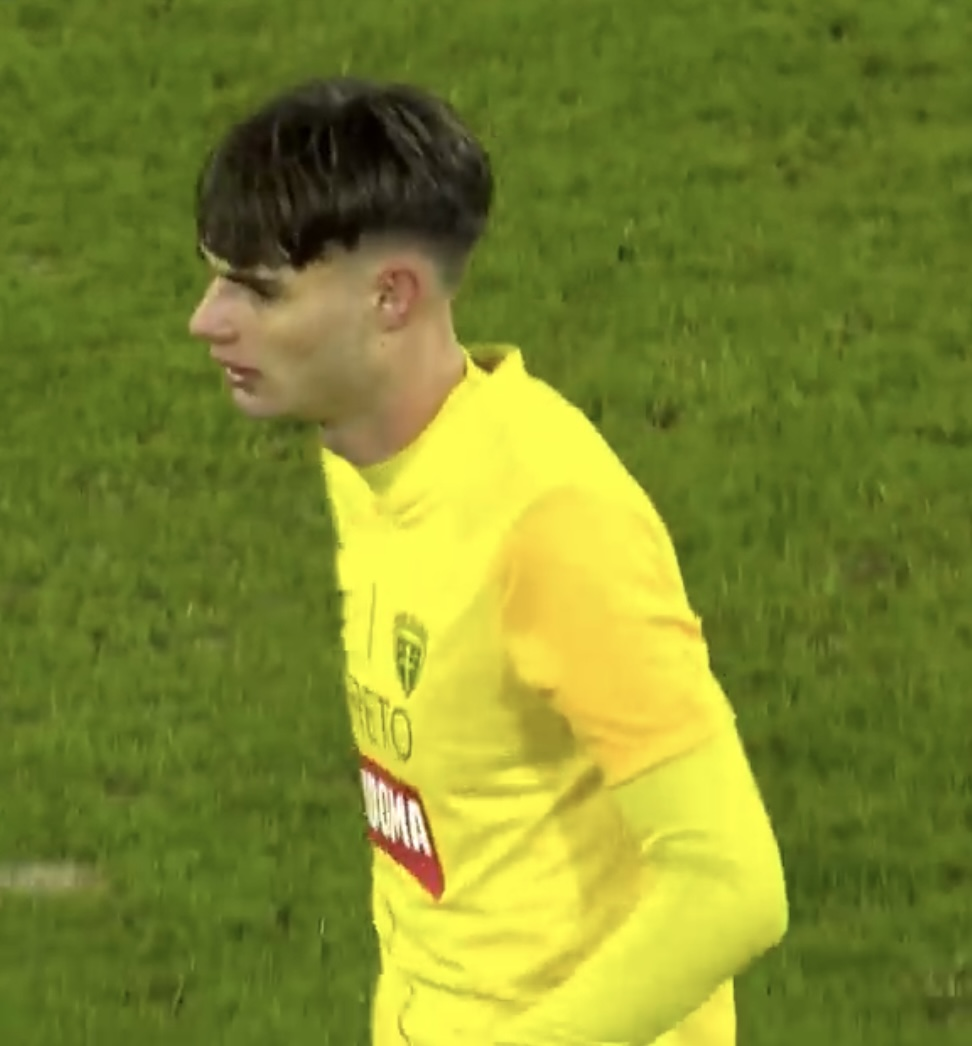
- Kóša with Žilina U19 in 2026

Personal information
- Date of birth: 2 March 2006 (age 20)
- Place of birth: Slovakia
- Height: 1.88 m (6 ft 2 in)
- Position: Winger

Team information
- Current team: MŠK Žilina
- Number: 7

Youth career
- –2021: FC Nitra
- 2021–2024: MŠK Žilina

Senior career*
Years	Team	Apps	(Gls)
2024–	MŠK Žilina B	29	(6)
2024–	MŠK Žilina	32	(5)

International career
	Slovakia U15	2	(0)
	Slovakia U16	5	(0)
	Slovakia U17	4	(0)
	Slovakia U18	10	(3)
- Slovakia U19
- * Club domestic league appearances and goals as of 21 September 2026

František Kóša (born 2 March 2006) is a Slovak professional footballer who plays for Slovak First Football League club MŠK Žilina as a right winger.

== Club career ==
=== MŠK Žilina ===
==== Youth ====
Kóša is a graduate of the Žilina youth academy. In the Youth Champions League, Kóša scored a key goal against Sparta Prague U19, and set up a goal action against Borussia Dortmund to make it 1–1. In the autumn, he scored three times for the older youth team of Žilina, and in the 2023–24 season he was the second best scorer in the U17 first league with 17 goals.

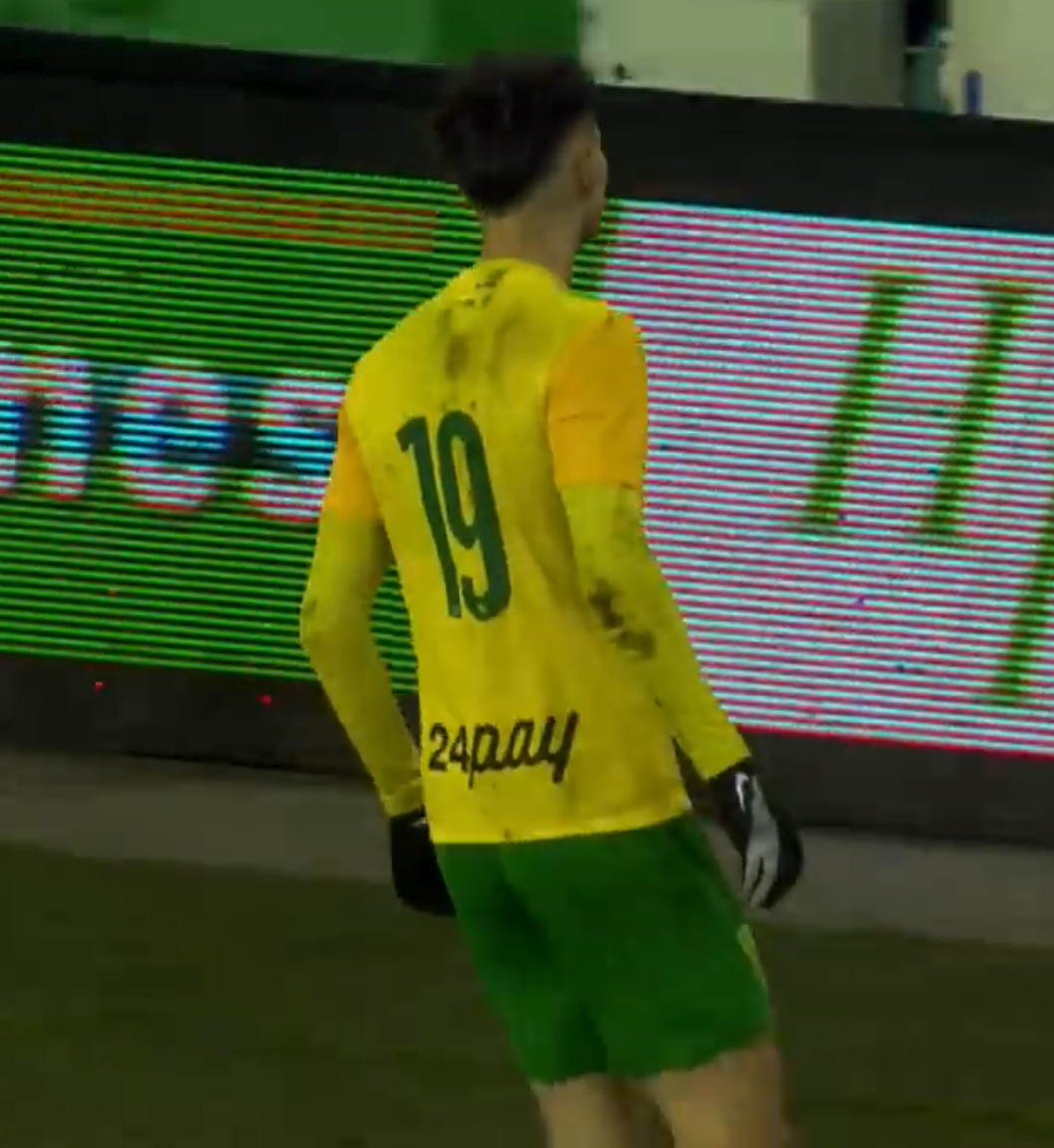
Kóša in a match against Liverpool U19 in 2026

==== Senior ====
Kóša made his professional debut for Žilina on 7 August 2024 in a 0–0 draw against Podbrezová, coming on as a substitute in the 67th minute for Yves Erick Bile. His first start for the club came on 8 March 2025, in a 0–0 draw once again against Podbrezová, he came off in the 64th minute for Lukáš Prokop. Kóša scored his first goal for Žilina in a 3–3 draw against MFK Ružomberok in September 2025, scoring in the 90th minute to equalize the game. In December 2025 he was named Slovakia's under-19 player of the year. During the winter preparations he played with the U19 side, where he scored the winning goal in a 2–1 win against Liverpool in the 65th minute, helping his team qualify to the UEFA Youth League round of 16.

== International career ==
=== Under-18 ===
Kóša scored his first goal at youth international level in a 2–1 win over Guatemala, scoring the first goal in the 36th minute. Guatemala would later equalize the game, however a goal in the 93rd minute of the game by Tomáš Husarčík would win the game for Slovakia.

=== Under-19 ===
On 11 March 2025, Kóša was nominated for the Slovakia national under-19 team for three friendlies against Poland, Montenegro and Georgia. He played in a 2–2 draw against Georgia, playing the full game.

== Honours ==
Žilina

- Slovak Cup: 2025–26
