= Jakub Badžgoň =

Slovak footballer (born 2005)

Personal information
- Date of birth: 2 June 2005 (age 21)
- Place of birth: Turzovka, Slovakia
- Height: 1.90 m (6 ft 3 in)
- Position: Goalkeeper

Team information
- Current team: MŠK Žilina
- Number: 1

Youth career
- –2023: MŠK Žilina

Senior career*
Years	Team	Apps	(Gls)
2023–	MŠK Žilina B	30	(0)
2024–	MŠK Žilina	13	(0)

International career
2021	Slovakia U17	10	(0)
2022	Slovakia U18	3	(0)
2023	Slovakia U19	5	(0)
- * Club domestic league appearances and goals as of 25 May 2026

Jakub Badžgoň (born 2 June 2005) is a Slovak professional footballer who plays for Slovak First Football League club MŠK Žilina as a goalkeeper. He currently represents Slovakia at youth level.

== Early life ==
Badžgoň is a native of Turzovka, from where he started playing for the local team FK Tatran Turzovka.

== Club career ==
=== MŠK Žilina ===
==== Youth ====
Badžgoň joined the MŠK Žilina youth academy in 2016, joining the U9 category. As a youth player, he helped Žilina U19 beat Pafos, Sparta Prague and Borussia Dortmund in the 2024 UEFA Youth League qualifying stages. In 2022, he signed his first professional contract at the age of seventeen.

==== Senior ====
In 2024, he signed an extension to his contract with Žilina, keeping him at the club until 2027. Following the injury of first team goalkeeper Ľubomír Belko, Badžgoň made his professional debut in a match against AS Trenčín on 30 November 2024. He would help his team win the game 4–2. He saved two penalties in a penalty shootout against MFK Zemplín Michalovce in the 2024–25 Slovak Cup, helping his team advance to the quarter-finals. A few weeks later, he would make another appearance, playing in a 1–0 defeat against DAC Dunajska Streda. Following the departure of Ľubomír Belko in the winter transfer window, Badžgoň started a match against KFC Komárno on 8 February 2026, keeping a clean sheet in a 1–0 victory.

== International career ==
Badžgoň received his first nomination for the Slovakia national under-17 team ahead of preparation matches against Bosnia and Herzegovina U17. Six months later, he was nominated for a match against Netherlands in the second round of the European Under-17 Championship qualifiers. He failed to keep a clean sheet in a 1–1 draw.

== Honours ==
Žilina

- Slovak Cup: 2025–26
