= Marek Okál =

Slovak footballer (born 2008)

Personal information
- Date of birth: 7 November 2008 (age 17)
- Height: 1.82 m (6 ft 0 in)
- Position: Centre-back

Team information
- Current team: MŠK Žilina
- Number: 2

Youth career
- –2025: MŠK Žilina

Senior career*
Years	Team	Apps	(Gls)
2025–2026	MŠK Žilina B	14	(0)
2026–	MŠK Žilina	12	(0)

International career^{‡}
2023	Slovakia U16	4	(0)
2024	Slovakia U17	6	(1)
2025	Slovakia U18	2	(0)
2025–	Slovakia U19	7	(0)
- * Club domestic league appearances and goals as of 21 September 2026 ‡ National team caps and goals as of 17:36, 18 March 2026 (UTC)

Marek Okál (born 7 November 2008) is a Slovak professional footballer who plays for Slovak First Football League side MŠK Žilina as a centre-back.

In 2024, Okál was a part of the U17 squad that would play in the 2024 UEFA European Under-17 Championship in Cyprus. He was the youngest player to be called-up, at the age of 15.

== Club career ==
Okál is a product of the Žilina youth academy. On 11 October 2024, he signed his first professional contract with MŠK Žilina, signing until June 2027 to become the youngest player to receive a contract in the club’s history. Okál transferred Žilina B-team in 2024. He played 10 matches for the team in the 2. Liga. After impressing with his performances, he became part of the A-team training process, where he was the youngest player to participate. He captained the under-19 side in a historic 2–1 victory against Liverpool U19, advancing to the round of 16 of the UEFA Youth League. Five days later, on 8 February 2026, Okál made his professional league debut for the A-team of MŠK Žilina, playing the full match of a 1–0 win against KFC Komárno. He played in a 1–0 win against title holders Slovan Bratislava.

== International career ==
In 2024, Okál was selected by the head coach of the Slovakia under-17 team, Branislav Fodrek, to be a part of the squad ahead of the 2024 UEFA European Under-17 Championship held in Cyprus. He was the youngest player to be called up to the team. He would play in the first game of the group stages, a 0–0 draw against Sweden, playing the whole match. Okál played in all group stage matches but would not be able to help his team qualify to the next round, as they finished on last place with only one point.

== Honours ==
Žilina

- Slovak Cup: 2025–26
