= Krisztián Bari =

Slovak footballer

Personal information
- Full name: Krisztián Bari
- Date of birth: 6 February 2001 (age 25)
- Place of birth: Fiľakovo, Slovakia
- Height: 1.73 m (5 ft 8 in)
- Positions: Left-back; left winger

Team information
- Current team: Žilina
- Number: 20

Youth career
- –2017: Fiľakovo
- 2017–2019: DAC Dunajská Streda

Senior career*
| Years | Team | Apps | (Gls) |
| 2019 | → Šamorín (loan) | 1 | (0) |
| 2019–2020 | DAC Dunajská Streda | 0 | (0) |
| 2020–2024 | Žilina B | 30 | (4) |
| 2021– | Žilina | 131 | (7) |

International career^{‡}
| 2018 | Slovakia U17 | 1 | (0) |
| 2018 | Slovakia U18 | 1 | (0) |
| 2019 | Slovakia U19 | 3 | (0) |
| 2026– | Slovakia | 2 | (0) |
- * Club domestic league appearances and goals as of 21 September 2026 ‡ National team caps and goals as of 5 June 2026

Krisztián Bari (born 6 February 2001) is a Slovak professional footballer who plays as a left-back for Fortuna Liga club MŠK Žilina and the Slovakia national team.

== Club career ==
=== MŠK Žilina ===
Bari made his Fortuna Liga debut for Žilina during a home fixture against FC Spartak Trnava on 14 May 2022.

== Personal life ==
He is a son of former known Slovak forward Eugen Bari. The family is of Romani descent.

== Career statistics ==
=== International ===
As of match played 5 June 2026

Appearances and goals by national team and year
| National team | Year | Apps | Goals |
|---|---|---|---|
| Slovakia | 2026 | 2 | 0 |
| Total | | 2 | 0 |

== Honours ==
Žilina

- Slovak Cup: 2025–26
