= Tobiáš Pališčák =

Slovak footballer (born 2007)

Personal information
- Date of birth: 25 October 2007 (age 19)
- Place of birth: Prešov, Slovakia
- Height: 1.84 m (6 ft 0 in)
- Position: Centre-back

Team information
- Current team: Viktoria Plzeň
- Number: 2

Youth career
- –2024: Žilina

Senior career*
Years	Team	Apps	(Gls)
2024–2026	Žilina B	20	(0)
2025–2026	Žilina	25	(0)
2026–	Viktoria Plzeň	0	(0)

International career^{‡}
2023	Slovakia U17	2	(0)
2024	Slovakia U18	4	(0)
2024	Slovakia U19	5	(1)
2025–	Slovakia U21	4	(0)
2026–	Slovakia	1	(0)
- * Club domestic league appearances and goals as of 25 May 2026 ‡ National team caps and goals as of 16 November 2026

Tobiáš Pališčák (born 25 October 2007) is a Slovak professional footballer who plays as a centre-back for Czech First League club Viktoria Plzeň and the Slovakia national team.

== Club career ==
=== Žilina ===
==== Youth ====
Pališčák is a product of the MŠK Žilina youth academy. He was a part of the squad in the Youth League which defeated Pafos 6–0 on aggregate. In the next round they were drawn with Sparta Prague. They drew 2–2 away, and in the home match in Žilina, after a 4–4 draw, a penalty shootout took place, in which Žilina would win.

==== Senior ====
After graduating from the Žilina academy, Pališčák joined the club’s B team. From there he joined the A-team of MŠK Žilina. He made his professional debut as a 16-year-old in a 5–0 away win over Slovan Bratislava, playing 26 minutes against the former champions. On 27 November 2025, he signed an extension to his contract with Žilina, keeping him at the club until December 2029. Pališčák made his European debut in a 3–0 loss against Raków Częstochowa, coming on off the bench as a substitute in the 85th minute for Samuel Kopásek. During the winter preparations he played with the U19 side, where he helped his team qualify to the UEFA Youth League round of 16 after a 2–1 win against Liverpool.

=== Viktoria Plzeň ===
On 1 September 2026, Pališčák signed a four-year contract with Czech First League club Viktoria Plzeň.

== International career ==
Pališčák made his Slovakia national under-21 debut in a 2–2 draw against Ireland, playing the whole match.

== Career statistics ==
=== International ===
As of match played 16 November 2026

Appearances and goals by national team and year
National team	Year	Apps	Goals
Slovakia	2026	1	0
Total		1	0

== Honours ==
Žilina

- Slovak Cup: 2025–26
