= Samuel Ďatko =

Slovak footballer

Personal information
- Full name: Samuel Ďatko
- Date of birth: 24 June 2001 (age 25)
- Place of birth: Brezno, Slovakia
- Position: Right winger

Team information
- Current team: MŠK Žilina
- Number: 24

Youth career
- 2007–2013: ŠK Partizán Čierny Balog
- 2013–2019: Železiarne Podbrezová

Senior career*
Years	Team	Apps	(Gls)
2019–2024	Železiarne Podbrezová	122	(7)
2024–	Žilina	57	(8)
2024–	Žilina B	6	(1)
2024	→ Železiarne Podbrezová (loan)	14	(1)

International career
2019	Slovakia U19	5	(0)
2022	Slovakia U21	3	(0)
- * Club domestic league appearances and goals as of 21 September 2026

Samuel Ďatko (born 24 June 2001) is a Slovak professional footballer who plays for MŠK Žilina as a right winger.

== Club career ==
=== Železiarne Podbrezová ===
Ďatko made his professional debut for Železiarne Podbrezová against ViOn Zlaté Moravce on 4 May 2019.

== International career ==
Ďatko was first recognised in Slovakia senior national team nomination in November 2022 by Francesco Calzona being listed as an alternate for two friendly fixtures against Montenegro and Marek Hamšík's retirement game against Chile. He remained in the position of an alternate for prospective national team players' training camp in early December.

== Honours ==
Žilina

- Slovak Cup: 2025–26
