= Marko Roginić =

Croatian footballer

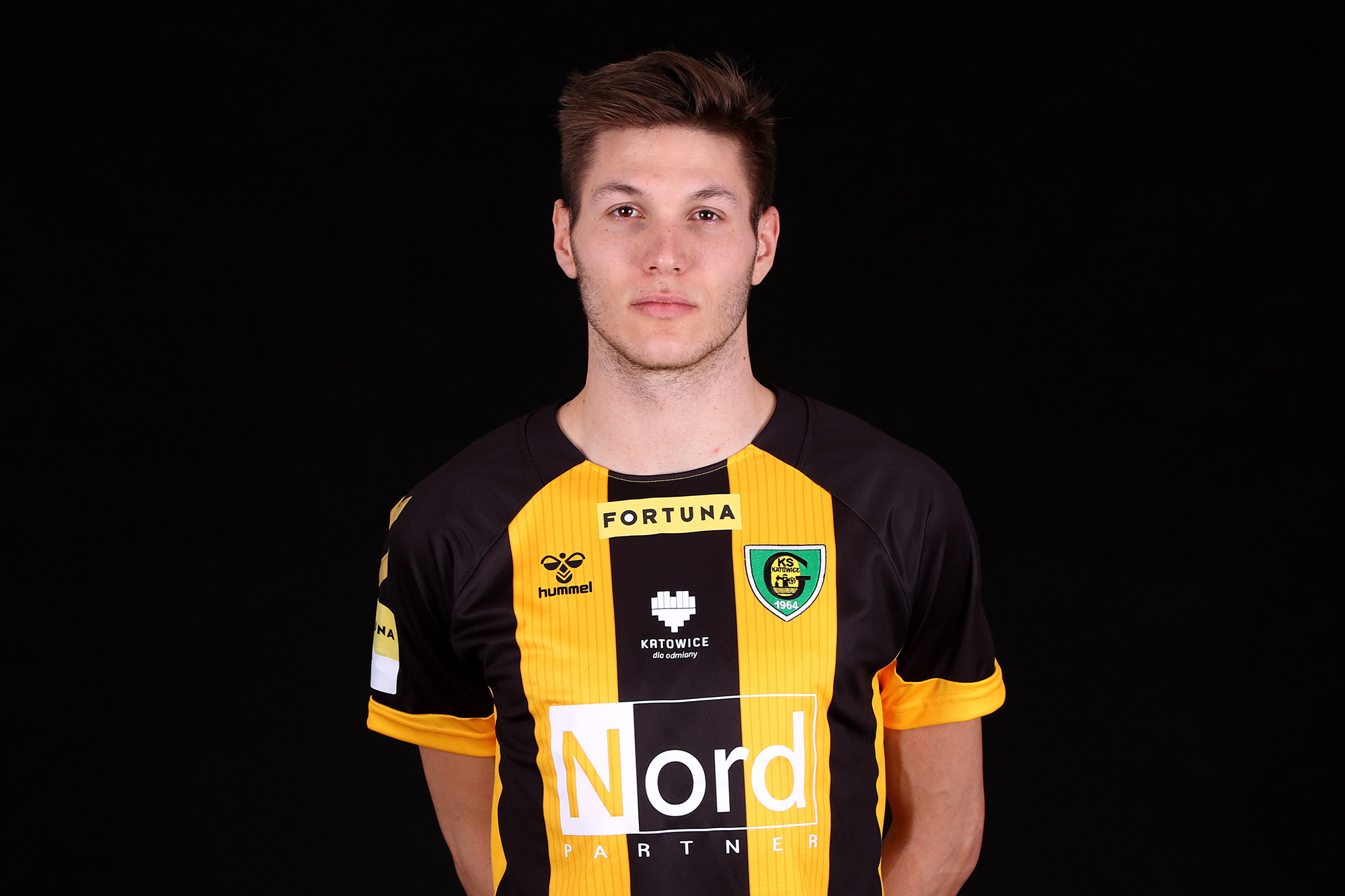
- Roginić with GKS Katowice in 2022

Personal information
- Date of birth: 5 September 1995 (age 31)
- Place of birth: Bjelovar, Croatia
- Height: 1.88 m (6 ft 2 in)
- Position: Striker

Team information
- Current team: MŠK Žilina
- Number: 95

Youth career
- –2011: Varaždin
- 2013–2014: Varaždin

Senior career*
Years	Team	Apps	(Gls)
2012–2013	Sloboda Varaždin	35	(13)
2013–2015	Varaždin	50	(11)
2015–2016	Bjelovar	27	(6)
2016	Pušćine	15	(4)
2017–2019	Nafta 1903	52	(35)
2019–2022	Podbeskidzie	76	(15)
2022–2023	GKS Katowice	41	(3)
2023–2025	Górnik Łęczna	57	(8)
2025–	Žilina	38	(9)
- * Club domestic league appearances and goals as of 21 September 2026

Marko Roginić (born 5 September 1995) is a Croatian professional footballer who plays as a forward for Slovak club MŠK Žilina.

== Career ==
At the age of 16, Roginić converted from a goalkeeper to a striker.

In 2017, he signed for Slovenian second division side Nafta 1903, scoring 21 goals in 28 league appearances during his first season there.

Before the second half of the 2018–19 season, Roginić signed for Podbeskidzie Bielsko-Biała in the Polish second division.

== Honours ==
Žilina

- Slovak Cup: 2025–26
