= Filip Kaša =

Czech footballer (born 1994)

Personal information
- Date of birth: 1 January 1994 (age 32)
- Place of birth: Ostrava, Czech Republic
- Height: 1.91 m (6 ft 3 in)
- Position: Centre-back

Team information
- Current team: Žilina
- Number: 25

Youth career
- 2002–2012: Baník Ostrava

Senior career*
Years	Team	Apps	(Gls)
2014–2016	Baník Ostrava	47	(1)
2016–2020	Žilina	92	(11)
2020–2023	Viktoria Plzeň	50	(2)
2023–2024	DAC Dunajská Streda	14	(0)
2024–2025	Győr	2	(0)
2025–	Žilina	27	(1)

International career
2010	Czech Republic U17	3	(0)
2014–2017	Czech Republic U21	5	(0)
2021	Czech Republic	2	(0)
- * Club domestic league appearances and goals as of 25 May 2026

Filip Kaša (born 1 January 1994) is a Czech professional footballer who plays for Slovak club Žilina as a centre-back.

== Club career ==
=== MŠK Žilina ===
For over three years, Kaša had played for Žilina. He was released as Žilina had entered liquidation due to the coronavirus pandemic. He had won the Fortuna Liga with the team once.

=== Viktoria Plzeň ===
On 6 May 2020 it had been announced that Káčer had signed for Viktoria Plzeň, along with Miroslav Káčer, who was also released from Žilina. They had re-joined their former coach from the Slovak club, Adrián Guľa, under whom they had won the Slovak Fortuna Liga in the 2016–17 season. The terms of his agreement with Viktoria were not announced.

=== Győr ===
On 27 August 2024, Kaša signed a one-year deal with Győr in Hungary.

== International career ==
He had played international football at under-21 level for Czech Republic U21.

He made his debut for the Czech Republic national football team on 5 September 2021 in a World Cup qualifier against Belgium, a 0–3 away loss. He started the game and played the whole match.

== Honours ==
Žilina

- Fortuna Liga: 2016–17
- Slovak Cup: 2025–26
