= Xavier Adang =

Cameroonian footballer

Personal information
- Full name: Xavier Rodrigue Adang Mveng
- Date of birth: 7 June 2004 (age 22)
- Place of birth: Cameroon
- Height: 1.85 m (6 ft 1 in)
- Position: Defensive midfielder

Team information
- Current team: Žilina
- Number: 6

Youth career
- –2022: Gambinos Stars

Senior career*
Years	Team	Apps	(Gls)
2022–	Žilina B	29	(1)
2023–	Žilina	85	(10)
- * Club domestic league appearances and goals as of 21 September 2026

Xavier Rodrigue Adang Mveng (born 7 June 2004) is a Cameroonian professional footballer who plays for Žilina in the Niké Liga as a defensive midfielder.

== Club career ==
=== MŠK Žilina ===
Adang made his Fortuna Liga debut for Žilina against FC Spartak Trnava on 20 May 2023.

== Honours ==
Žilina

- Slovak Cup: 2025–26
