= Vladimír Veselý =

Slovak footballer and manager

Personal information
- Full name: Vladimír Veselý
- Date of birth: 8 July 1976 (age 50)
- Place of birth: Žilina, Czechoslovakia
- Height: 1.88 m (6 ft 2 in)
- Position: Defender

Team information
- Current team: Žilina (manager)

Youth career
- Žilina

Senior career*
Years	Team	Apps	(Gls)
–1997	Žilina		
1996	→ Dubnica (loan)	7	(1)
1997	→ Trenčín (loan)	1	(0)
1998–2001	České Budějovice	11	(0)
1999–2000	→ Tatran Poštorná (loan)	15	(0)
2000	→ Dunajská Streda (loan)	17	(2)
2001–2002	Dunajská Streda	41	(12)
2003–2006	Dukla Banská Bystrica		
2006	→ Podbrezová (loan)		
2007–2011	Skałka Żabnica		
2011–2014	TJ VTJ Rajecké Teplice - Konská		
2014	TJ Družstevník Bitarová		

Managerial career
- 2011–2012: Skałka Żabnica
- 2013–2018: Žilina (U19)
- 2019: Podbrezová
- 2019–2020: Ružomberok (U19)
- 2020–2026: Žilina B
- 2026–: Žilina
- * Club domestic league appearances and goals

Vladimír Veselý (born 8 July 1976) is a Slovak professional football manager and former player who is currently the manager of Slovak First Football League club Žilina.

== Coaching career ==
On 18 October 2019, Veselý was appointed manager of MFK Ružomberok's U19 team.
