= Miroslav Káčer =

Slovak footballer

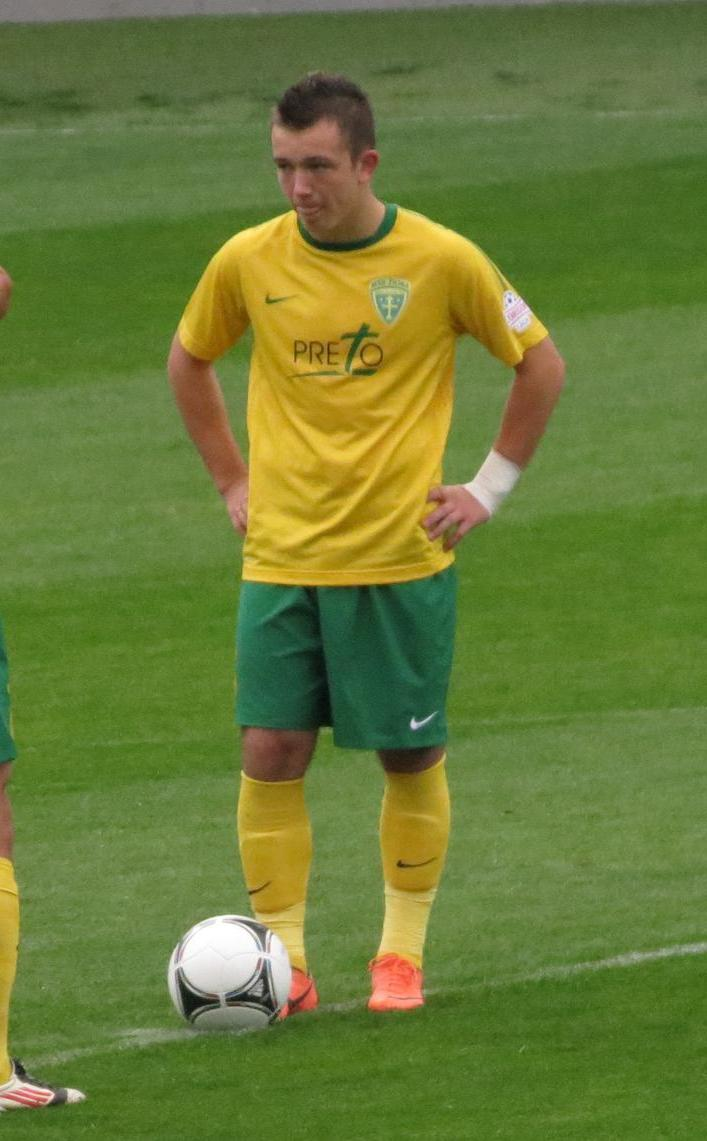
- Káčer with Žilina in 2012

Personal information
- Full name: Miroslav Káčer
- Date of birth: 2 February 1996 (age 30)
- Place of birth: Žilina, Slovakia
- Height: 1.70 m (5 ft 7 in)
- Position: Midfielder

Team information
- Current team: Žilina
- Number: 66

Youth career
- 2004–2015: Žilina

Senior career*
Years	Team	Apps	(Gls)
2012–2020	Žilina	184	(32)
2020–2023	Viktoria Plzeň	44	(2)
2022–2023	→ Dunajská Streda (loan)	27	(1)
2023–2024	Dunajská Streda	24	(1)
2024–	Žilina	65	(9)

International career
2011	Slovakia U15	2	(0)
2011	Slovakia U16	1	(0)
2012–2013	Slovakia U17	13	(1)
2014	Slovakia U18	2	(0)
2014	Slovakia U20	1	(0)
2014–2015	Slovakia U19	7	(1)
2015–2018	Slovakia U21	15	(0)
2017	Slovakia	2	(0)
- * Club domestic league appearances and goals as of 21 September 2026

Miroslav Káčer (born 2 February 1996) is a Slovak professional footballer who plays for MŠK Žilina in the Niké Liga as a midfielder.

== Club career ==
=== MŠK Žilina ===
Káčer began his football career at his hometown club MŠK Žilina. Aged 16, Miroslav made his debut for Žilina against Spartak Myjava on 13 July 2012. On his competition debut, he scored his first professional goal in a 4–1 win.

Káčer was released from Žilina, as the club had entered liquidation, due to a coronavirus pandemic.

=== Viktoria Plzeň ===
On 6 May 2020, it had been announced that Káčer had signed for Viktoria Plzeň, along with Filip Kaša, who was also released from Žilina. They had re-joined their former coach from the Slovak club, Adrián Guľa, under whom they had won the Slovak Fortuna Liga in the 2016–17 season. The terms of his agreement with Viktoria were not announced.

== International career ==
Káčer was called up for two unofficial friendly fixtures held in Abu Dhabi, UAE, in January 2017, against Uganda and Sweden. He capped his debut against Uganda, when he was fielded in the 70th minute, when he substituted Roman Gergel. Slovakia went on to lose the game 1–3. He also appeared in the second match against Sweden, playing the first hour of the match, which Slovakia lost 0–6, before being substituted by Gergel.

== Honours ==
Žilina

- Fortuna Liga: 2016–17
- Slovak Cup: 2025–26

Viktoria Plzeň

- Czech First League: 2021–22

Individual

- Slovak Super Liga Team of the Season: 2019–20, 2022–23
