= Branislav Fodrek =

Slovak footballer

Personal information
- Date of birth: 5 February 1981 (age 45)
- Place of birth: Bratislava, Czechoslovakia
- Height: 1.82 m (6 ft 0 in)
- Position: Midfielder

Youth career
- FK Rapid Bratislava

Senior career*
Years	Team	Apps	(Gls)
1999–2004	Slovan Bratislava	37	(6)
2004–2005	Petržalka	67	(18)
2006	Saturn Ramenskoye	12	(1)
2007–2010	Petržalka	53	(10)
2010–2011	Szombathelyi Haladás	18	(3)
2012–2013	Dunajská Streda	34	(4)
2014	Vrakúň		

International career
2004–2006	Slovakia	4	(0)

Managerial career
- 2014–2015: Senec U19
- 2015: Kráľová pri Senci
- 2015–2017: Dunajská Streda B
- 2017–2018: Dunajská Streda (assistant)
- 2018–2021: Slovakia U16
- 2019–2022: Slovakia U17
- 2022–2023: Slovakia U18
- 2023–2024: Slovakia U17
- 2024–2026: DAC Dunajská Streda
- 2026–: Slovan Liberec
- * Club domestic league appearances and goals

Branislav Fodrek (born 5 February 1981) is a Slovak professional football manager and former player who played as a midfielder. He was last in charge of Slovak First Football League club DAC Dunajská Streda until his sacking in June 2026.

On 18 June 2026, Fodrek was appointed manager of Slovan Liberec.
