= Samuel Kopásek =

Slovak footballer

Personal information
- Full name: Samuel Kopásek
- Date of birth: 22 May 2003 (age 23)
- Place of birth: Čadca, Slovakia
- Height: 1.75 m (5 ft 9 in)
- Position: Right-back

Team information
- Current team: Lechia Gdańsk (on loan from Pardubice)
- Number: 19

Youth career
- –2014: ŠK Čierne
- 2013: → Čadca (loan)
- 2014–2021: Žilina

Senior career*
Years	Team	Apps	(Gls)
2021–2025	Žilina B	37	(3)
2022–2026	Žilina	60	(2)
2023–2024	→ Tatran Prešov (loan)	15	(1)
2026–	Pardubice	4	(0)
2026–	→ Lechia Gdańsk (loan)	0	(0)

International career
2021–2022	Slovakia U19	15	(1)
2022–2023	Slovakia U20	11	(0)
2023–2025	Slovakia U21	14	(0)
- * Club domestic league appearances and goals as of 27 May 2026

Samuel Kopásek (born 22 May 2003) is a Slovak professional footballer who plays as a right-back for I liga club Lechia Gdańsk, on loan from Pardubice.

== Club career ==
=== MŠK Žilina ===
Kopásek made his Fortuna Liga debut for Žilina during a away fixture against Ružomberok on 4 May 2022.

=== Pardubice ===
On 12 February 2026, Kopásek signed a contract with Czech First League club Pardubice until 30 June 2030.

==== Loan to Lechia Gdańsk ====
On 17 July 2026, Kopásek joined Polish I liga club Lechia Gdańsk on loan with an option to buy.
