= Michal Faško =

Slovak footballer

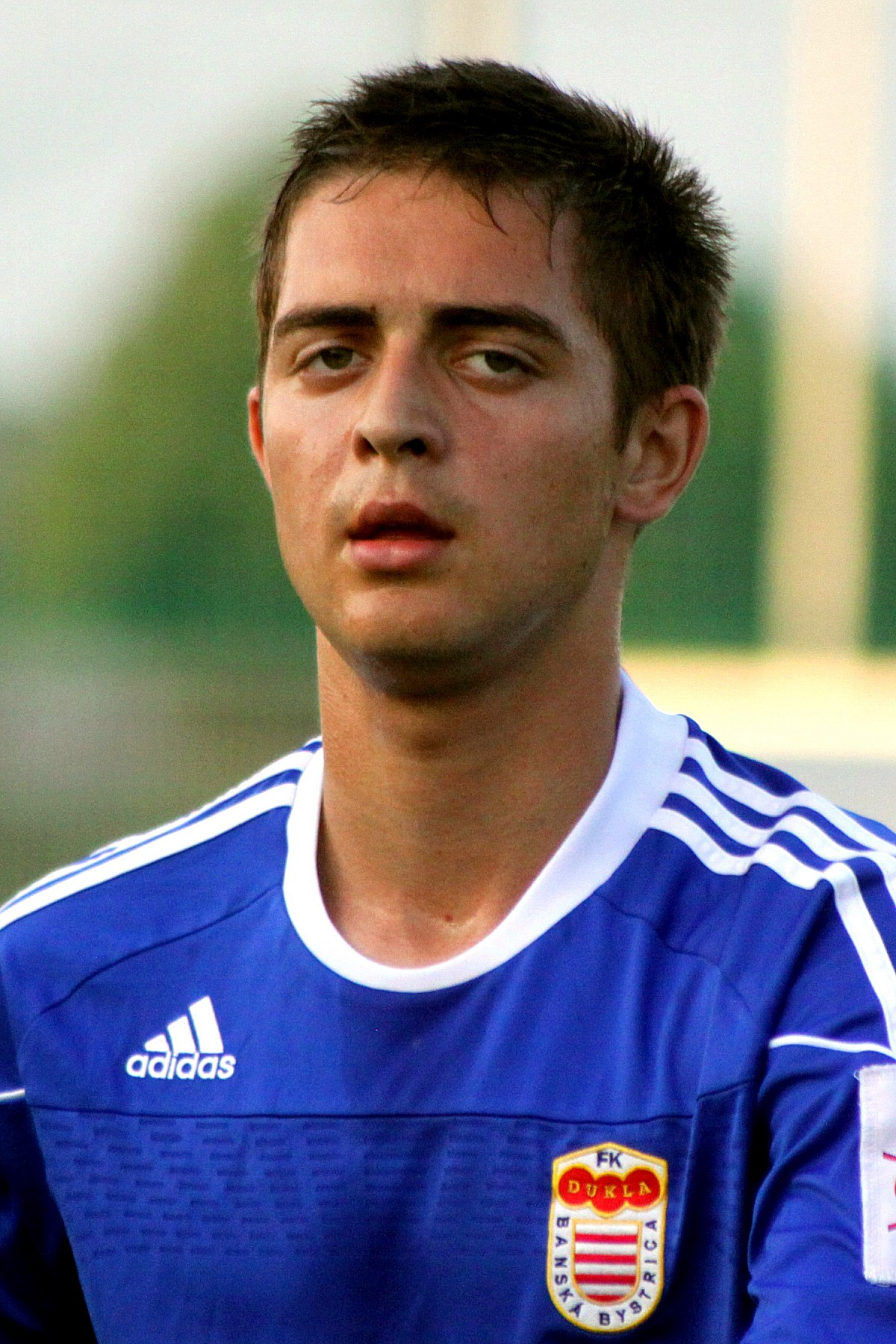
- Faško with Dukla Banská Bystrica in 2013

Personal information
- Date of birth: 24 August 1994 (age 32)
- Place of birth: Brezno, Slovakia
- Height: 1.82 m (6 ft 0 in)
- Position: Midfielder

Team information
- Current team: Žilina
- Number: 23

Youth career
- 1999–2008: Partizán Čierny Balog
- 2008–2010: ŽP Šport Podbrezová

Senior career*
Years	Team	Apps	(Gls)
2011–2015	Dukla Banská Bystrica	49	(0)
2015–2017	Ružomberok	53	(7)
2017–2019	Grasshoppers Zürich	11	(0)
2018	→ Eintracht Braunschweig (loan)	1	(0)
2019	→ Karviná (loan)	11	(1)
2019–2020	Nitra	40	(9)
2021–2022	Slovan Liberec	34	(0)
2022–2023	Dukla Banská Bystrica	27	(7)
2023–2025	FC Košice	63	(8)
2025–	Žilina	40	(17)

International career^{‡}
2010–2011	Slovakia U17	4	(1)
2011	Slovakia U18	1	(0)
2012–2013	Slovakia U19	2	(0)
2016–2017	Slovakia U21	5	(2)
2026–	Slovakia	2	(0)
- * Club domestic league appearances and goals as of 21 September 2026 ‡ National team caps and goals as of 5 June 2026

Michal Faško (born 24 August 1994) is a Slovak professional footballer who plays as a midfielder for Slovak First Football League club MŠK Žilina and the Slovakia national team. Previously, he played for Dukla Banská Bystrica.

== Career ==
Faško made his debut for Dukla Banská Bystrica as a 16-year-old, against Spartak Trnava, on 14 May 2011. He replaced Jakub Považanec in the 89th minute. Dukla won the game, at Štadión Antona Malatinského, 0-2.

On 21 June 2017, he joined Swiss club Grasshoppers on a four-year contract.

In June 2018, Faško joined Eintracht Braunschweig on a season-long loan. He returned to his parent club in January 2019. On 10 January 2019, he joined MFK Karviná on loan for the rest of the season.

In July 2022, he returned to Dukla Banská Bystrica.

On 20 June 2023, Faško joined new Slovak First Football League club FC Košice on a two-year contract.

== Personal life ==
His younger brother Šimon is also footballer, currently playing for FK Železiarne Podbrezová.

== Career statistics ==
=== International ===
As of match played 5 June 2026

Appearances and goals by national team and year
National team	Year	Apps	Goals
Slovakia	2026	2	0
Total		2	0

== Honours ==
Žilina

- Slovak Cup: 2025–26
