= Pavol Staňo =

Slovak footballer and manager

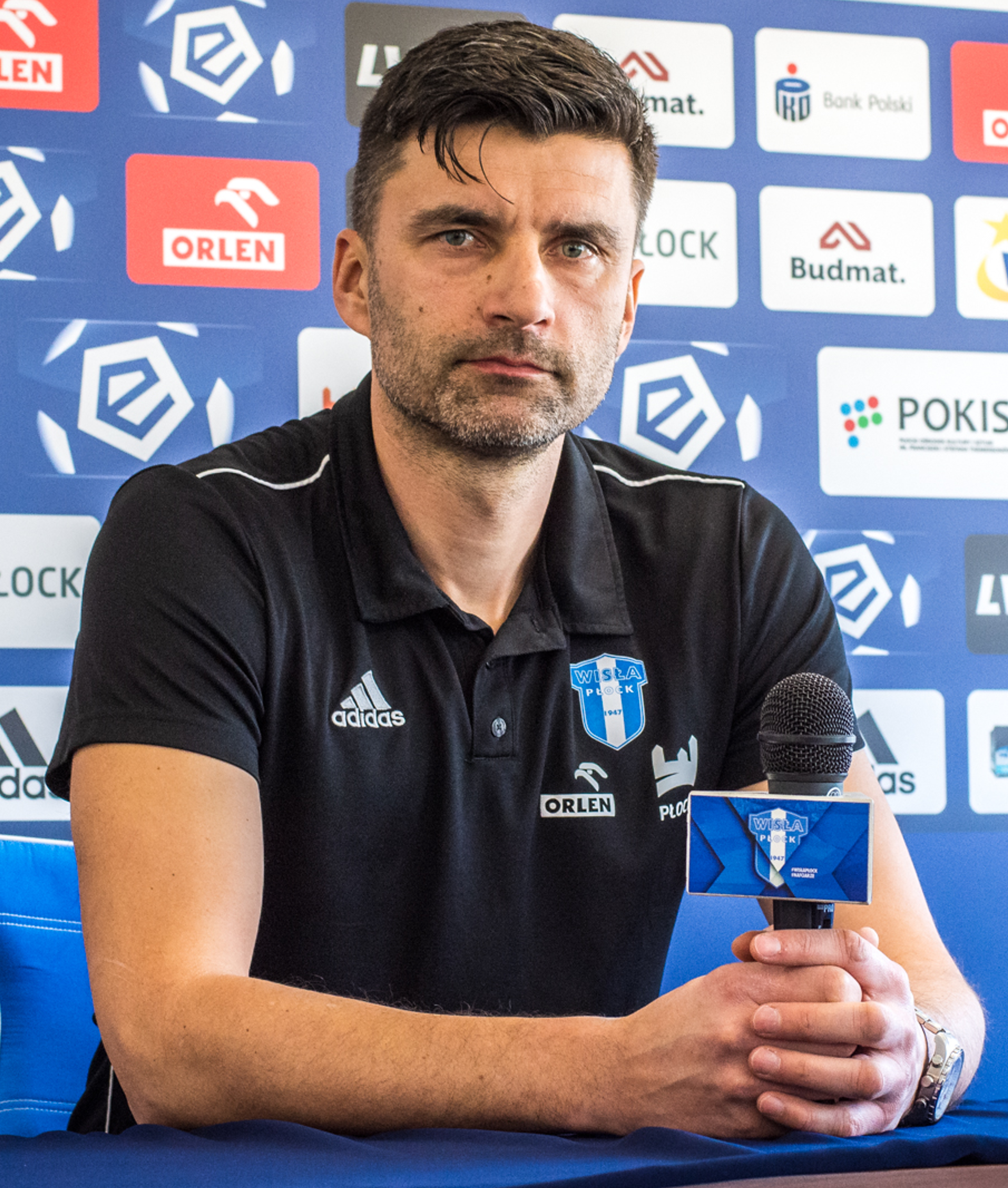
- Staňo with Wisła Płock in 2022

Personal information
- Full name: Pavol Staňo
- Date of birth: 29 September 1977 (age 49)
- Place of birth: Čierne, Czechoslovakia
- Height: 1.91 m (6 ft 3 in)
- Position: Defender

Senior career*
Years	Team	Apps	(Gls)
1995	ŠK Čierne		
1996	Inter Bratislava		
1996	Čadca	89	(6)
1997–2001	ZŤS Martin		
2001–2002	Rimavská Sobota		
2002–2005	Spartak Trnava	89	(6)
2005–2007	Artmedia Petržalka	44	(7)
2007–2008	Polonia Bytom	17	(1)
2008–2009	Jagiellonia Białystok	43	(2)
2010–2014	Korona Kielce	131	(17)
2014–2015	Podbeskidzie Bielsko-Biała	26	(2)
2015–2016	Bruk-Bet Termalica	26	(1)
2017	ŠK Čierne		

Managerial career
- 2017–2018: Tatran Krásno nad Kysucou
- 2018: Bruk-Bet Termalica (assistant)
- 2020–2021: Žilina
- 2022–2023: Wisła Płock
- 2024–2025: Górnik Łęczna
- 2025–2026: Žilina
- * Club domestic league appearances and goals

Pavol Staňo (born 29 September 1977) is a Slovak professional football manager and former player who was most recently in charge of Slovak First Football League club Žilina.

== Club career ==
Staňo played for Spartak Trnava and Artmedia Petržalka in the Slovak Corgoň Liga.

== Managerial statistics ==
As of match played 9 August 2026

Managerial record by team and tenure
Team	From	To	Record							
Team	From	To	G	W	D	L	GF	GA	GD	Win %
Žilina	2 January 2020	3 October 2021	70	35	13	22	154	102	+52	50.00
Wisła Płock	7 March 2022	16 May 2023	44	16	7	21	57	65	−8	36.36
Górnik Łęczna	10 January 2024	30 June 2025	52	21	17	14	68	54	+14	40.38
Žilina	11 July 2025	12 August 2026	49	25	9	15	99	65	+34	51.02
Total			215	97	46	72	378	286	+92	45.12

== Honours ==
=== Player ===
Artmedia Petržalka

- Pribina Cup: 2005

Jagiellonia Białystok

- Polish Cup: 2009–10

=== Manager ===
Žilina

- Slovak Cup: 2025–26

Individual

- Slovak Super Liga Manager of the Season: 2020–21
- Ekstraklasa Coach of the Month: July 2022
