= MŠK Žilina B =

- Full name: Mestský Športový Klub Žilina B
- Founded: 1908
- Ground: Štadión Strážov, Žilina
- Capacity: 300
- Manager: Vladimír Veselý
- League: 2. liga
- 2025–26: 2. Liga, 13th of 16
- Website: http://www.mskzilina.sk/
Home colours	Away colours

Mestský Športový Klub Žilina B, commonly known as MŠK Žilina B, is the reserve team of Slovak First Football League club MŠK Žilina. The team currently play in the 2. liga.

== Stadium ==
MŠK Žilina B plays home matches at Štadión Strážov in Žilina.

== Current squad ==
As of 22 July 2026

Note: Flags indicate national team as defined under FIFA eligibility rules; some limited exceptions apply. Players may hold more than one non-FIFA nationality.

No.	Pos.	Nation	Player
3	DF	SVK	Marek Rehak
6	DF	SVK	Alex Dovičák
7	FW	SVK	Dominik Kmet'
8	DF	SVK	Marco Bortoli
9	FW	SVK	Michal Pekelský
13	FW	SVK	Vladimír Vaľko
15	FW	SVK	Teodor Staník
18	MF	GHA	Manuel Yendare
20	MF	SVK	Michal Škvarka (captain)

No.	Pos.	Nation	Player
23	FW	CZE	Denis Alijagić
26	GK	SVK	Tamás Tarcsi
—	DF	CIV	Marcus Traore
—	DF	GHA	Issah Mohammed
—	DF	GHA	Abdul Majid Ibrahim
—	DF	SVK	Martin Mesko
—	FW	SEN	Talla Diouf
—	DF	SVK	Matúš Pavlík
—	DF	SVK	Lucáš Žilinčík

=== Out on loan ===
Note: Flags indicate national team as defined under FIFA eligibility rules; some limited exceptions apply. Players may hold more than one non-FIFA nationality.

No.	Pos.	Nation	Player
—	GK	SVK	Jakub Jokl (at MŠK Považská Bystrica until 30 July 2027)
—	MF	SVK	Samuel Šamaj (at MŠK Považská Bystrica until 30 July 2027)
—	MF	SVK	Samuel Javorček (at MŠK Považská Bystrica until 30 July 2027)

For recent transfers, see List of Slovak football transfers summer 2024.

Head coach: (Slovakia) Vladimír Veselý

Assistant coach: (Slovakia) Filip Kňazovič

Assistant coach: (Slovakia) Viktor Pečovský

Goalkeeper coach: (Slovakia) Dušan Molčan
