= Štadión pod Dubňom =

Football stadium in Žilina, Slovakia

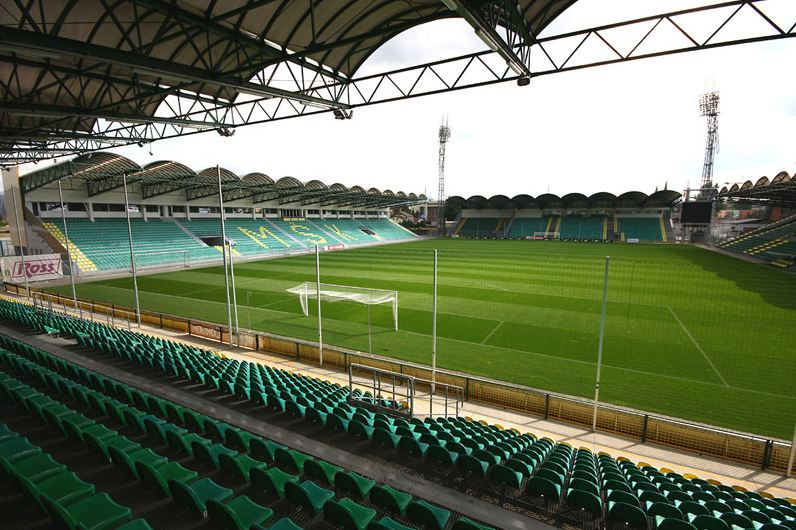
- UEFA
- Interactive map of Štadión pod Dubňom
- Location: Žilina, Slovakia
- Coordinates: 49°13′44.83″N 18°44′41.24″E
- Operator: MŠK Žilina
- Capacity: 10,280
- Surface: Grass (1941–2016) Artificial grass (2016-present)
- Record attendance: 25,000 (Slovakia vs Dynamo Moscow, 1953)
- Field size: 105 m × 68 m (344 ft × 223 ft)

Construction
- Opened: 1941
- Renovated: 2006–2015

Tenants
- MŠK Žilina (1941–present); Slovakia national football team (2003–2015); UEFA U-17 Championship (2013); UEFA U-21 Championship (2025)

Štadión pod Dubňom is an all-seater football stadium situated in Žilina, Slovakia, which is the home of MŠK Žilina. It is named after the hill Dubeň, adjacent to which it is located, and the name of the stadium literally means "Stadium under the Dubeň Hill." The capacity is 10,280 seats.

== History ==
The original stadium was opened on 10 August 1941 although the ground had been in use since the club's foundation in 1909. As of 2002, predominantly due to UEFA requirements, the club proposed an extensive renovation of the stadium. Throughout the first stages of redevelopment all seating low capacity stands were erected behind the goals to comply with UEFA rules. Following years, as the expansion continued, extra rows of seats were added and both stands were fully covered.

Since the 2012–13 season, the away supporters have been housed on one side of the North Stand, historically the Kop stand attended solely by the home fans. This decision has triggered a huge discontent among the home supporters, with many of them boycotting to attend home games as a sign of protest.

Currently the stadium consists of four separate stands. The West and East Stands run alongside the pitch, with West Stand considered to be the main stand equipped with VIP seats, hospitality boxes and press room, TV commentators seats as well as section for wheelchair users. Changing rooms are also situated in the West Stand. The East Stand was the last to be rebuilt and was reopened before 2009–10 season.

For security purposes the stadium has been equipped with modern security installations such as a monitoring system. The intensity of the floodlighting is 1,930 lux. There is also a large screen inside the ground for showing highlights of match days. A prayer room is situated between South and East Stand.

Štadión pod Dubňom was also a venue to host international matches of the Slovakia national football team until 2016, when the natural grass was replaced by the artificial grass.

The stadium was one of the venues used for the 2013 UEFA European Under-17 Championship where six matches were held including the final.

== International matches ==
Štadión pod Dubňom has hosted 11 competitive and 10 friendly matches of the Slovakia national football team.

30 April 2003 International Friendly	Slovakia	2–2	Greece	Žilina, Slovakia
18:00; Match 103	Szilárd Németh 14', 87'	Report	Vasilios Tsiartas 13' (pen.); Lampros Choutos 76'	Stadium: Štadión Pod Dubňom; Attendance: 2,863; Referee: Stefan Messner (Austria)

10 September 2003 2004 UEFA Euro; Qualifying Group 7	Slovakia	1–1	Macedonia	Žilina, Slovakia
20:15; Match 107	Szilárd Németh 25'		Dragan Dimitrovski 62'	Stadium: Štadión Pod Dubňom; Attendance: 2,286; Referee: Leif Sundell (Sweden)

15 November 2006 International Friendly	Slovakia	3–1	Bulgaria	Žilina, Slovakia
17:30; Match 140	Marek Mintál 8'; Marek Sapara 53'; Miroslav Karhan 78' (pen.)	Report]	Kalojan Karadžinov 80'	Stadium: Štadión Pod Dubňom; Attendance: 4,823; Referee: Jacek Granat (Poland)

19 November 2008 International Friendly	Slovakia	4–0	Liechtenstein	Žilina, Slovakia
17:30; Match 162	Marek Hamšík 43', 72'; Róbert Vittek 75'; Róbert Jež 90+'	Report]		Stadium: Štadión Pod Dubňom; Attendance: 2,010; Referee: Orechov (Ukraine)

17 November 2009 International Friendly	Slovakia	1–2	Chile	Žilina, Slovakia
17:00; Match 174	Stanislav Šesták 17'	Report	Gonzalo Jara 8'; Esteban Paredes 55'	Stadium: Štadión Pod Dubňom; Attendance: 11,072; Referee: Istvan Vad (Hungary)

3 March 2010 International Friendly	Slovakia	0–1	Norway	Žilina, Slovakia
17:00; Match 175		Report	Morten Moldskred 67'	Stadium: Štadión Pod Dubňom; Attendance: 9,756; Referee: Bas Nijhuis (Netherlands)

12 October 2010 2012 UEFA Euro; Qualifying Group B	Slovakia	1–1	Republic of Ireland	Žilina, Slovakia
20:30; Match 186	Ján Ďurica 36'	Report]	Sean St Ledger 16'	Stadium: Štadión Pod Dubňom; Attendance: 10,892; Referee: Alberto Undiano Mallenco (Spain)

6 September 2011 2012 UEFA Euro; Qualifying Group B	Slovakia	0–4	Armenia	Žilina, Slovakia
20:15; Match 194		Report]	Yura Movsisyan 57'; Henrikh Mkhitaryan 70'; Gevorg Ghazaryan 80'; Artur Sarkisov 90+1'	Stadium: Štadión Pod Dubňom; Attendance: 7,238; Referee: Marcin Borski (Poland)

7 October 2011 2012 UEFA Euro; Qualifying Group B	Slovakia	0–1	Russia	Žilina, Slovakia
20:45; Match 195		Report]	Alan Dzagoev 71'	Stadium: Štadión Pod Dubňom; Attendance: 10,087; Referee: Jonas Eriksson (Sweden)

22 March 2013 2014 FIFA World Cup; Qualifying Group G	Slovakia	1–1	Lithuania	Žilina, Slovakia
20:10; Match 207	Martin Jakubko 40'	Report]	Darvydas Šernas 19'	Stadium: Štadión pod Dubňom; Attendance: 4,560; Referee: Michael Oliver (England)

26 March 2013 International Friendly	Slovakia	0–0	Sweden	Žilina, Slovakia
20:15; Match 208		Report		Stadium: Štadión pod Dubňom; Attendance: 3,123; Referee: Gerhard Grobelnik (Austria)

10 September 2013 2014 FIFA World Cup; Qualifying Group G	Slovakia	1–2	Bosnia and Herzegovina	Žilina, Slovakia
20:15; Match 212	Marek Hamšík 42'	Report]	Ermin Bičakčić 70'; Izet Hajrović 78'	Stadium: Štadión Pod Dubňom; Attendance: 9,438; Referee: David Fernández Borbalán (Spain)

4 September 2014 International Friendly	Slovakia	1–0	Malta	Žilina, Slovakia
18:20; Match 220	Adam Nemec 43'			Stadium: Štadión pod Dubňom; Attendance: 3,509; Referee: Miroslav Zelinka (Czech Republic)

9 October 2014 2016 UEFA Euro; Qualifying Group C	Slovakia	2–1	Spain	Žilina, Slovakia
20:45; Match 222	Juraj Kucka 17'; Miroslav Stoch 87'		Paco Alcácer 82'	Stadium: Štadión pod Dubňom; Attendance: 9,478; Referee: Björn Kuipers ()

18 November 2014 International Friendly	Slovakia	2–1	Finland	Žilina, Slovakia
18:20; Match 225	Filip Hološko 1'; Marek Hamšík 7'		Tomáš Hubočan 45' (o.g.)	Stadium: Štadión pod Dubňom; Attendance: 3,998; Referee: Markus Hameter

27 March 2015 2016 UEFA Euro; Qualifying Group C	Slovakia	3–0	Luxembourg	Žilina, Slovakia
20:45; Match 226	Adam Nemec 10'; Vladimír Weiss 21'; Peter Pekarík 40'	Report		Stadium: Štadión pod Dubňom; Attendance: 9,524; Referee: Stephan Studer ()

31 March 2015 International Friendly	Slovakia	1–0	Czech Republic	Žilina, Slovakia
20:30; Match 227	Ondrej Duda 49'			Stadium: Štadión pod Dubňom; Attendance: 10,594; Referee: István Vad ()

14 June 2015 2016 UEFA Euro; Qualifying Group C	Slovakia	2–1	Macedonia	Žilina, Slovakia
20:45; Match 228	Kornel Saláta 8'; Marek Hamšík 38'	Report	Arijan Ademi 69'	Stadium: Štadión pod Dubňom; Attendance: 10,765; Referee: Kenn Hansen ()

8 Sept. 2015 2016 UEFA Euro; Qualifying Group C	Slovakia	0-0	Ukraine	Žilina, Slovakia
20:45 match 230		Report		Stadium: Štadión Pod Dubňom; Attendance: 10,648; Referee: Martin Atkinson ()

9 October 2015 2016 UEFA Euro; Qualifying Group C	Slovakia	0–1	Belarus	Žilina, Slovakia
20:45; Match 231		Report	Stanislav Dragun 34'	Stadium: Štadión pod Dubňom; Attendance: 9,859; Referee: Hüseyin Göçek ()

17 November 2015 International Friendly	Slovakia	3–1	Iceland	Žilina, Slovakia
20:45; Match 234	Róbert Mak 58', 61'; Michal Ďuriš 84'	Report	Alfred Finnbogason 8'	Stadium: Štadión pod Dubňom; Attendance: 5,568; Referee: Pawel Raczkowski ()
