= Slovakia national under-18 football team =

National U-18 association football team

Slovakia U-18
- Association: Slovenský futbalový zväz
- Confederation: UEFA (Europe)
- Head coach: Branislav Fodrek
- FIFA code: SVK
First colours	Second colours

The Slovakia national under-18 football team, controlled by the Slovak Football Association, is Slovakia's national under 18 football team and is considered to be a feeder team for the Slovakia U19 team.

== Current squad ==
The following players were named in the squad for the friendlies against Switzerland on 20 and 22 May 2025.

Caps and goals are correct as of 18 November 2024, after the match against Romania

No.	Pos.	Player	Date of birth (age)	Caps	Goals	Club
1	GK	Sebastián Zajac	31 October 2007 (age 19)	2	0	(Football Association of the Czech Republic) Sparta Prague
12	GK	Dávid Kalanin	17 May 2007 (age 19)	2	0	(Football Association of the Czech Republic) Slavia Prague
3	DF	Dominik Balog	4 April 2007 (age 19)	2	0	(Slovak Football Association) Slovan Bratislava
4	DF	Alex Lajčiak	17 December 2007 (age 18)	6	0	(Slovak Football Association) Železiarne Podbrezová
5	DF	Daniel Žiška	9 October 2007 (age 19)	5	0	(Slovak Football Association) Trenčín
6	DF	Martin Konopka	4 October 2007 (age 19)	0	0	(Slovak Football Association) Spartak Trnava
13	DF	Marek Okál	7 November 2008 (age 18)	0	0	(Slovak Football Association) Žilina
19	DF	Lukáš Pristach	19 May 2007 (age 19)	0	0	(Slovak Football Association) Spartak Trnava
2	MF	Tobiáš Pališčák	25 October 2007 (age 19)	3	0	(Slovak Football Association) Žilina
7	MF	Nathan Udvaros	17 September 2007 (age 19)	2	1	(Slovak Football Association) Dunajska Streda
10	MF	Šimon Vlna	11 April 2007 (age 19)	6	0	(Football Association of the Czech Republic) Baník Ostrava
14	MF	Samuel Šubert	26 March 2007 (age 19)	0	0	(Slovak Football Association) Železiarne Podbrezová
15	MF	Martin Hlavatý	27 March 2007 (age 19)	3	0	(Slovak Football Association) Petržalka
16	MF	Simon Nináč	23 April 2007 (age 19)	3	0	(Football Association of the Czech Republic) Baník Ostrava
17	MF	Martin Bačík	7 March 2007 (age 19)	6	1	(Slovak Football Association) Ružomberok
18	MF	Filip Slovák	26 May 2007 (age 19)	0	0	(Slovak Football Association) Trenčín
23	MF	Filip Trello	28 January 2007 (age 19)	5	0	(Slovak Football Association) Spartak Trnava
8	FW	Dominik Kmeť	13 January 2007 (age 19)	0	0	(Slovak Football Association) Žilina
9	FW	David Bukovský	27 August 2007 (age 19)	0	0	(Slovak Football Association) Spartak Trnava
11	FW	Samuel Kováčik	28 May 2007 (age 19)	5	0	(Polish Football Association) Legia Warsaw
20	FW	Ján Brnula	17 May 2007 (age 19)	5	1	(Slovak Football Association) Dunajska Streda

== Staff ==
Head coach	(Slovakia) Milan Malatinský
Assistant coach	(Slovakia) Miroslav Guza
Goalkeeper coach	(Slovakia) Roman Hodál
Team doctor	(Czech Republic) (Croatia) Tomaš Kovačić
Masseur	(Slovakia) Juraj Ludík
Technical leader	(Slovakia) Jakub Kojnok

== See also ==
- Slovakia national football team
- Slovakia national under-21 football team
- Slovakia national under-19 football team
- Slovakia national under-17 football team
- Slovakia national under-16 football team
