= 1997–98 Slovak Cup =

Tournament details
- Country: Slovakia
- Teams: 42

Final positions
- Champions: Spartak Trnava
- Runners-up: 1. FC Košice

The 1997–98 Slovak Cup was the 29th season of Slovakia's annual knock-out cup competition and the fifth since the independence of Slovakia. It began on 29 July 1997 with the matches of preliminary round and ended on 7 June 1998 with the final. The winners of the competition earned a place in the qualifying round of the UEFA Cup Winners' Cup. Slovan Bratislava were the defending champions.

== Preliminary round ==
The first legs were played on 29 July 1997. The second legs were played on 19 August 1997.

Team 1	Agg.	Team 2	1st leg	2nd leg
ZTS Martin	0–2	Tesla Stropkov	0–1	0–1
Slovan Levice	13–1	ŠK Malacky	6–0	7–1
SM Gabčíkovo	2–2 (a)	Slovan Duslo Šaľa	2–1	0–1
Matadorfix Bratislava	3–0	Slovakofarma Hlohovec	1–0	2–0
Železiarne Podbrezová	2–3	FAC LB Zvolen	1–3	1–0
Steel Trans Ličartovce	3–1	Lokomotiva Spišská Nová Ves	1–0	2–1

== First round ==
The games were played on 28 and 29 October 1997.

Team 1	Score	Team 2
Slovan Duslo Šaľa	0–2	MFK Prievidza
Steel Trans Ličartovce	3–0	Tauris Rimavská Sobota
Tesla Stropkov	0–3	Tatran Prešov
Koba Senec	2–1	Slovan Bratislava
Matadorfix Bratislava	0–5	Inter Bratislava
ŠKP Tatran Devín	0–2	Spartak Trnava
FC Nitra	2–1	MŠK Žilina
Kerametal Dubnica nad Váhom	0–0 (5–3 p)	Artmedia Petržalka
Slovan Levice	1–7	Ozeta Dukla Trenčín
PFK Piešťany	3–0	DAC Dunajská Streda
FAC LB Zvolen	1–3	Dukla Banská Bystrica
Slovmag Jelšava	0–1	1. FC Košice
Bukocel Vranov nad Topľou	0–0 (5–3 p)	HFC Humenné
Slavoj Trebišov	0–2	Lokomotíva Košice
Matador Púchov	1–0	SCP Ružomberok
NCHZ Nováky	1–2	BSC JAS Bardejov

== Second round ==
The games were played on 11 and 12 November 1997.

Team 1	Score	Team 2
Dukla Banská Bystrica	2–2 (5–4 p)	Ozeta Dukla Trenčín
PFK Piešťany	0–2	MFK Prievidza
Matador Púchov	1–4	Tatran Prešov
Lokomotíva Košice	8–0	Bukocel Vranov nad Topľou
Spartak Trnava	1–0	Koba Senec
Kerametal Dubnica nad Váhom	1–5	BSC JAS Bardejov
Steel Trans Ličartovce	1–2	Inter Bratislava
1. FC Košice	3–2	FC Nitra

== Quarter-finals ==
The games were played on 17 and 18 March 1998.

17 March 1998	BSC JAS Bardejov	0–2	Spartak Trnava	Bardejov
		Report	Timko 30'; Luhový 43'	Stadium: Mestský štadión Bardejov; Attendance: 3,000; Referee: Artúr Jakubec

17 March 1998	1. FC Košice	5–1	MFK Prievidza	Košice
	Németh 6'; Zvara 9', 59' (pen.); Janočko 44'; Strelec 47'	Report	Štofan 49'	Stadium: Štadión Lokomotívy; Attendance: 500; Referee: Ladislav Gádoši

18 March 1998	Lokomotíva Košice	1–0	Tatran Prešov	Košice
	Korínek 82'	Report		Stadium: Štadión Krásna nad Hornádom; Attendance: 500; Referee: Jaroslav Jekkel

18 March 1998	Dukla Banská Bystrica	0–0 (6–7 p)	Inter Bratislava	Banská Bystrica
		Report		Stadium: Štadión SNP Štiavničky; Attendance: 870; Referee: Anton Stredák

== Semi-finals ==
The first legs were played on 7 April 1998. The second legs were played on 28 April 1998.

=== First legs ===
7 April 1998	1. FC Košice	3–0	Lokomotíva Košice	Košice
	Kožlej 4', 76'; Kozák 16' (pen.)	Report		Stadium: Štadión Lokomotívy; Attendance: 2,400; Referee: Milan Bezák

7 April 1998	Spartak Trnava	1–0	Inter Bratislava	Trnava
	Mačák 34'	Report		Stadium: Anton Malatinský Stadium; Attendance: 6,500; Referee: Jaroslav Jekkel

=== Second legs ===
28 April 1998	Lokomotíva Košice	3–1 (3–4 agg.)	1. FC Košice	Košice
	M. Daňko 52'; Kisel 76'; Móder 82'	Report	Zvara 26'	Stadium: Štadión Krásna nad Hornádom; Attendance: 684; Referee: Anton Stredák

28 April 1998	Inter Bratislava	1–1 (1–2 agg.)	Spartak Trnava	Bratislava
	Majsniar 65'	Report	Formanko 71'	Stadium: Štadión Pasienky; Attendance: 4,500; Referee: Jozef Ligocký

== Final ==
7 June 1998
17:00 CEST

Spartak Trnava	2–0	1. FC Košice
Tittel 17'; Formanko 89'	Report

Stadium ŠKP Inter Dúbravka, Bratislava
Attendance: 7,800
Referee: Ján Fašung
