= 2000–01 2. Liga (Slovakia) =

2. liga
- Season: 2000–01
- Champions: FC Kerametal Dubnica n/V
- Promoted: FC Kerametal Dubnica n/V
- Relegated: BSC JAS Bardejov; FK Čaňa; ZŤS VTJ Martin; FK Baník Prievidza; Slovenský hodváb Senica; Družstevník Slovenský Grob
- Matches: 306
- Goals: 779 (2.55 per match)

The 2000–01 season of the Slovak Second Football League (also known as 2. liga) was the eighth season of the league since its establishment. It began in July–August 2000 and ended in June 2001.

== League standing ==
Pos	Team	Pld	W	D	L	GF	GA	GD	Pts	Promotion or relegation
1	Kerametal Dubnica n/V (C, P)	34	19	9	6	44	18	+26	66	Promotion to Mars superliga
2	FC Nitra	34	21	3	10	77	27	+50	66	
3	Podbrezová	34	16	10	8	43	28	+15	58	
4	VTJ Koba Senec	34	17	6	11	48	34	+14	57	
5	DAC 1904 Dunajská Streda	34	16	7	11	43	41	+2	55	
6	Tauris Rimavská Sobota	34	15	9	10	47	33	+14	54	
7	NCHZ-DAK Nováky	34	14	11	9	42	32	+10	53	
8	Tatran ŠKP Devín	34	13	14	7	58	43	+15	53	
9	Steel Trans Ličartovce	34	15	5	14	50	36	+14	50	
10	VTJ Topvar Topoľčany	34	14	5	15	43	52	−9	47	
11	Dukla Banská Bystrica	34	13	7	14	39	32	+7	46	
12	1. HFC Humenné	34	12	10	12	33	31	+2	46	
13	BSC JAS Bardejov (R)	34	11	10	13	42	50	−8	43	Relegation to 3. Liga
14	FK Čaňa (R)	34	11	3	20	41	61	−20	36	Relegation to 3. Liga
15	ZŤS VTJ Martin (R)	34	7	13	14	43	60	−17	34	Relegation to 3. Liga
16	Baník Prievidza (R)	34	9	4	21	29	61	−32	31	Relegation to 3. Liga
17	SH Senica (R)	34	7	7	20	31	68	−37	28	Relegation to 3. Liga
18	Družstevník Slovenský Grob (R)	34	6	7	21	26	72	−46	25	Relegation to 3. Liga

Source: RSSSF.org
Rules for classification: 1) points; 2) goal difference; 3) number of goals scored.
(C) Champions; (P) Promoted; (R) Relegated

== See also ==
- 2000–01 Slovak Superliga
