= 1998–99 Slovak Superliga =

Mars superliga
- Season: 1998–99
- Dates: 1 August 1998 – 29 May 1999
- Champions: Slovan Bratislava
- Relegated: BSC JAS Bardejov; Rimavská Sobota
- Champions League: Slovan Bratislava
- UEFA Cup: Inter Bratislava; Spartak Trnava; Dukla Banská Bystrica
- Intertoto Cup: Ozeta Dukla Trenčín; MŠK Žilina
- Matches played: 240
- Goals scored: 616 (2.57 per match)
- Top goalscorer: Martin Fabuš (19 goals)
- Biggest home win: Inter 10:0 Bardejov
- Biggest away win: Dubnica 0:6 Inter
- Highest scoring: Inter 10:0 Bardejov
- Average attendance: ▼3,659

The 1998–99 Slovak First Football League (known as the Mars superliga for sponsorship reasons) was the sixth season of first-tier football league in Slovakia, since its establishment in 1993. It began on 1 August 1998 and ended on 29 May 1999. 1. FC Košice were the defending champions.

== Teams ==
A total of 16 teams was contested in the league, including 14 sides from the 1997–98 season and two promoted from the 2. Liga.

Lokomotíva Košice and FK DAC 1904 Dunajská Streda was relegated to the 1998–99 2. Liga. The two relegated teams were replaced by FC Nitra and ZTS Kerametal Dubnica.

=== Stadiums and locations ===
Location of teams in 1998–99 Mars superliga

Team	Home city	Stadium	Capacity
1. HFC Humenné	Humenné	Chemlon Stadion	10,000
1. FC Košice	Košice	Lokomotíva Stadium	9,000
Artmedia Petržalka	Petržalka	Štadión Petržalka	7,500
BSC JAS Bardejov	Bardejov	Mestský štadión Bardejov	3,040
Dukla Banská Bystrica	Banská Bystrica	SNP Stadium	10,000
Inter Slovnaft Bratislava	Bratislava	Štadión Pasienky	12,000
FC Nitra	Nitra	Štadión pod Zoborom	11,384
MFK Baník Prievidza	Prievidza	Futbalový štadión Prievidza	6,000
MFK SCP Ružomberok	Ružomberok	Štadión MFK Ružomberok	4,817
MŠK Žilina	Žilina	Štadión pod Dubňom	11,181
Ozeta Dukla Trenčín	Trenčín	Štadión na Sihoti	4,500
Slovan Bratislava	Bratislava	Tehelné pole	30,085
Spartak Trnava	Trnava	Štadión Antona Malatinského	18,448
Tatran Prešov	Prešov	Tatran Štadión	14,000
Tauris Rimavská Sobota	Rimavská Sobota	Na Zahradkach Stadium	5,000
ZTS Kerametal Dubnica	Dubnica	Štadión Zimný	5,450

== League table ==
Pos	Team	Pld	W	D	L	GF	GA	GD	Pts	Qualification or relegation
1	Slovan Bratislava (C)	30	21	7	2	56	11	+45	70	Qualification for Champions League second qualifying round
2	Inter Bratislava	30	21	5	4	64	15	+49	68	Qualification for UEFA Cup qualifying round
3	Spartak Trnava	30	19	7	4	59	20	+39	64	Qualification for UEFA Cup qualifying round
4	1. FC Košice	30	19	4	7	51	26	+25	61	
5	Ozeta Dukla Trenčín	30	15	8	7	53	25	+28	53	Qualification for Intertoto Cup first round
6	Žilina	30	15	3	12	36	42	−6	48	Qualification for Intertoto Cup first round
7	Ružomberok	30	12	10	8	31	31	0	46	
8	Tatran Prešov	30	11	10	9	38	35	+3	43	
9	Artmedia Petržalka	30	11	6	13	37	42	−5	39	
10	Humenné	30	10	5	15	24	37	−13	35	
11	Dukla Banská Bystrica	30	8	10	12	34	46	−12	34	Qualification for UEFA Cup first round (Note: Dukla Banská Bystrica qualify for 1999–2000 UEFA Cup as runner-up of 1998–99 Slovak Cup.)
12	Nitra	30	7	7	16	28	48	−20	28	
13	ZTS Dubnica	30	8	4	18	28	60	−32	28	
14	Baník Prievidza	30	6	6	18	34	56	−22	24	
15	Rimavská Sobota (R)	30	5	7	18	29	56	−27	22	Relegation to 2. Liga
16	Bardejov (R)	30	2	1	27	14	66	−52	7	Relegation to 2. Liga

Source: RSSSF.org
Rules for classification: 1) points; 2) goal difference; 3) number of goals scored.
(C) Champions; (R) Relegated

== Results ==
Home \ Away	ART	BB	BAR	DUB	HUM	INT	KOŠ	NIT	PRE	PRI	RIM	RUŽ	SLO	TRE	TRN	ŽIL
Artmedia Petržalka		1–1	2–0	2–1	2–0	0–0	3–1	2–1	1–0	0–0	5–2	1–1	0–2	1–3	2–3	2–0
Dukla Banská Bystrica	1–0		3–2	7–0	1–0	0–1	0–0	1–0	2–2	3–2	0–1	0–0	2–2	0–4	0–2	0–1
Bardejov	3–0	1–0		0–2	0–1	0–3	1–2	1–4	0–3	1–2	0–1	1–3	0–2	0–2	0–0	0–1
ZTS Dubnica	2–2	0–2	2–1		2–1	0–6	2–3	0–2	0–0	3–2	3–0	3–0	0–1	0–2	0–0	0–3
Humenné	1–2	0–0	1–0	1–0		0–1	0–2	1–3	0–0	6–2	1–0	0–0	0–0	0–4	1–0	3–1
Inter Bratislava	4–1	1–1	10–0	1–0	1–2		2–1	3–1	2–1	1–0	5–3	2–0	0–1	2–1	3–1	5–0
1. FC Košice	3–1	6–0	2–1	3–1	1–0	1–0		2–0	1–2	1–3	2–0	1–0	0–2	5–1	0–1	3–0
Nitra	0–3	4–1	3–1	0–1	0–2	0–2	0–0		2–2	2–1	0–0	3–0	0–4	1–1	0–3	0–1
Prešov	2–0	2–1	1–0	5–1	3–0	0–2	0–3	2–0		2–1	3–0	1–1	0–0	2–2	0–0	0–2
Baník Prievidza	2–1	0–0	5–0	1–2	0–1	0–3	1–1	1–1	1–1		2–0	0–2	0–2	0–4	0–2	2–1
Rimavská Sobota	1–0	0–2	2–0	2–2	0–0	0–2	1–2	1–1	4–1	1–1		2–3	1–1	1–1	2–4	1–2
Ružomberok	0–2	2–0	2–1	2–0	3–0	0–0	1–3	0–0	0–0	2–1	2–1		0–0	1–0	2–0	1–1
Slovan Bratislava	3–0	3–0	3–0	2–0	3–1	1–0	3–0	2–0	3–0	4–2	3–0	2–1		1–1	0–1	3–0
Ozeta Dukla Trenčín	2–0	2–2	2–0	3–0	1–0	0–0	0–1	3–0	0–1	3–0	3–0	1–1	1–0		0–0	6–1
Spartak Trnava	2–0	5–2	1–0	4–1	4–1	0–0	0–0	6–0	4–1	3–0	3–1	5–0	1–1	1–0		3–1
Žilina	1–1	2–2	1–0	2–0	1–0	0–2	0–1	1–0	2–1	3–2	2–1	0–1	0–2	4–0	2–0	

Source: RSSSF.org
Legend: Blue = home team win; Yellow = draw; Red = away team win.

== Season statistics ==
=== Top scorers ===
Rank	Player	Club	Goals
1	(Slovakia) Martin Fabuš	Trenčín	19
2	(Slovakia) Vladimír Sýkora	Rimavská Sobota	14
3	(Slovakia) Peter Babnič	Inter Bratislava	13
3	(Slovakia) Ľuboš Perniš	Baník Prievidza	13
5	(Ukraine) Ruslan Lyubarskyi	Košice	12
6	(Slovakia) Ľubomír Faktor	Banská Bystrica	11
6	(Slovakia) Marek Mintál	Žilina	11
6	(Slovakia) Attila Pinte	Inter Bratislava	11
6	(Slovakia) Štefan Rusnák	Banská Bystrica	11
10	(Brazil) Luís Fábio Gomes	Spartak Trnava	10
10	(Slovakia) Vladislav Zvara	Košice	10

== See also ==
- 1998–99 Slovak Cup
- 1998–99 2. Liga (Slovakia)
