= 2000–01 Slovak Superliga =

Mars superliga
- Season: 2000–01
- Dates: 18 July 2000 – 13 June 2001
- Champions: Inter Bratislava
- Relegated: Spartak Trnava
- Champions League: Inter Bratislava
- UEFA Cup: Slovan Bratislava; Ružomberok; Matador Púchov
- Intertoto Cup: Artmedia Petržalka
- Matches played: 180
- Goals scored: 515 (2.86 per match)
- Top goalscorer: Szilárd Németh (23 goals)
- Biggest home win: Slovan 6:0 Košice
- Biggest away win: Prešov 0:4 Ružomberok
- Highest scoring: Slovan 5:3 Inter; Trnava 4:4 Košice
- Average attendance: ▲3,578

The 2000–01 Slovak First Football League (known as the Mars superliga for sponsorship reasons) was the eighth season of first-tier football league in Slovakia, since its establishment in 1993. It began on 18 July 2000 and ended on 13 June 2001. AŠK Inter Slovnaft Bratislava were the defending champions.

== Teams ==
A total of 10 teams was contested in the league, including 9 sides from the 1999–2000 season and one promoted from the 2. Liga.

The seven teams (Koba Senec, ZTS Dubnica, 1. HFC Humenné, FC Nitra, DAC 1904 Dunajská Streda, Dukla Banská Bystrica and Baník Prievidza) were relegated to the 2000–01 2. Liga due to the decision of the organization of Mars superliga, that the number of teams in the league should be reduced from 16 to 10 teams from that season.

These relegated teams were replaced by FK Matador Púchov.

=== Stadiums and locations ===
Location of teams in 2000–01 Mars superliga

Team	Home city	Stadium	Capacity
1. FC Košice	Košice	Lokomotíva Stadium	9,000
Artmedia Petržalka	Petržalka	Štadión Petržalka	7,500
Inter Slovnaft Bratislava	Bratislava	Štadión Pasienky	12,000
Matador Púchov	Púchov	Mestský štadión	6,614
MFK SCP Ružomberok	Ružomberok	Štadión MFK Ružomberok	4,817
MŠK Žilina	Žilina	Štadión pod Dubňom	11,181
Ozeta Dukla Trenčín	Trenčín	Štadión na Sihoti	4,500
Slovan Bratislava	Bratislava	Tehelné pole	30,085
Spartak Trnava	Trnava	Štadión Antona Malatinského	18,448
Tatran Prešov	Prešov	Tatran Štadión	14,000

== League table ==
Pos	Team	Pld	W	D	L	GF	GA	GD	Pts	Qualification or relegation
1	Inter Bratislava (C)	36	25	5	6	73	28	+45	80	Qualification for Champions League second qualifying round
2	Slovan Bratislava	36	21	8	7	84	49	+35	71	Qualification for UEFA Cup qualifying round
3	Ružomberok	36	15	10	11	51	48	+3	55	Qualification for UEFA Cup qualifying round
4	Artmedia Petržalka	36	15	9	12	59	55	+4	54	Qualification for Intertoto Cup first round
5	Žilina	36	11	12	13	41	46	−5	45	
6	Matador Púchov	36	9	13	14	47	53	−6	40	Qualification for UEFA Cup qualifying round (Note: Matador Púchov qualify for 2001–02 UEFA Cup as Slovakia ranked third in the UEFA Fair Play Ranking.)
7	Tatran Prešov	36	10	10	16	44	54	−10	40	
8	Ozeta Dukla Trenčín	36	11	6	19	35	59	−24	39	
9	1. FC Košice	36	10	7	19	42	61	−19	37	
10	Spartak Trnava (R)	36	8	10	18	39	62	−23	34	Relegation to 2. Liga

Source: RSSSF.org
Rules for classification: 1) points; 2) goal difference; 3) number of goals scored.
(C) Champions; (R) Relegated

== Results ==
=== First half of season ===
Home \ Away	ART	INT	KOŠ	PRE	PÚC	RUŽ	SLO	TRE	TRN	ŽIL
Artmedia Petržalka		0–2	2–2	3–2	1–1	3–1	2–2	2–0	2–1	2–4
Inter Bratislava	4–1		2–0	2–0	2–0	2–1	2–0	4–0	4–0	2–0
1. FC Košice	2–1	2–0		0–3	2–0	1–2	0–1	2–0	2–1	2–1
Prešov	4–1	0–3	1–0		1–0	2–3	2–1	3–1	0–2	1–2
Matador Púchov	0–0	0–2	4–3	0–0		3–1	1–1	1–1	2–0	2–0
Ružomberok	2–1	0–0	1–0	1–1	3–1		2–3	1–0	3–0	2–1
Slovan Bratislava	1–1	1–1	5–2	3–1	3–1	2–0		5–0	4–2	5–1
Ozeta Dukla Trenčín	3–3	1–3	1–0	2–2	1–0	0–1	0–3		4–0	0–3
Spartak Trnava	2–0	2–2	4–4	0–0	1–0	0–0	1–1	2–1		2–0
Žilina	3–1	1–2	0–0	2–2	0–0	0–0	1–2	0–0	2–1	

Source: RSSSF.org
Legend: Blue = home team win; Yellow = draw; Red = away team win.

=== Second half of season ===
Home \ Away	ART	INT	KOŠ	PRE	PÚC	RUŽ	SLO	TRE	TRN	ŽIL
Artmedia Petržalka		2–1	3–1	3–1	1–1	4–2	3–0	1–0	3–0	0–0
Inter Bratislava	0–1		2–1	4–0	2–3	2–1	3–0	2–1	1–0	3–0
1. FC Košice	1–2	1–1		0–3	4–2	2–1	2–3	0–1	1–2	0–0
Prešov	1–3	2–1	0–0		1–1	0–4	1–1	0–0	2–0	3–0
Matador Púchov	1–1	1–3	1–2	2–2		1–1	2–5	5–1	3–1	1–1
Ružomberok	1–0	0–0	3–2	2–1	1–1		1–1	1–3	3–2	0–0
Slovan Bratislava	2–1	5–3	6–0	2–1	1–3	4–1		2–3	4–1	0–0
Ozeta Dukla Trenčín	3–1	1–4	2–0	1–0	1–0	1–3	1–2		1–0	0–2
Spartak Trnava	2–1	0–1	0–0	1–0	2–3	1–1	1–2	0–0		2–2
Žilina	2–3	0–1	0–1	3–1	1–0	3–1	2–1	1–0	3–3	

Source: RSSSF.org
Legend: Blue = home team win; Yellow = draw; Red = away team win.

== Season statistics ==
=== Top scorers ===
Rank	Player	Club	Goals
1	(Slovakia) Szilárd Németh	Inter Bratislava	23
2	(Slovakia) Ľubomír Meszároš	Slovan Bratislava	18
3	(Slovakia) Tibor Jančula	Slovan Bratislava	17
4	(Central African Republic) Alias Lembakoali	Matador Púchov	16
5	(Slovakia) Ľubomír Reiter	Žilina	12
6	(Slovakia) Tomáš Oravec	SCP Ružomberok	11
7	(Slovakia) Róbert Vittek	Slovan Bratislava	10
7	(Slovakia) Peter Babnič	Inter Bratislava	10
9	(Slovakia) Jozef Mužlay	Matador Púchov	9
9	(Slovakia) Norbert Hrnčár	Slovan Bratislava	9

== See also ==
- 2000–01 Slovak Cup
- 2000–01 2. Liga (Slovakia)
