= 1996–97 2. Liga (Slovakia) =

2. liga
- Season: 1996–97
- Champions: MŠK SCP Ružomberok
- Promoted: MŠK SCP Ružomberok; FK Ozeta Dukla Trenčín
- Relegated: FC EX-Hlásnik Vráble; FC Agro Hurbanovo; ŠKP Bratislava; FKM Nové Zámky
- Matches played: 306
- Goals scored: 833 (2.72 per match)

The 1996–97 2. Liga (Slovakia) season was the 4th edition of the Slovak Second Football League (also known as 2. liga) professional football competition. It began in late July 1996 and ended in June 1997.

== League standing ==
Pos	Team	Pld	W	D	L	GF	GA	GD	Pts	Promotion or relegation
1	MŠK SCP Ružomberok (C, P)	34	25	3	6	78	19	+59	78	Promotion to Mars superliga
2	Ozeta Dukla Trenčín (P)	34	24	2	8	68	30	+38	74	Promotion to Mars superliga
3	Tatran Devín	34	21	7	6	67	30	+37	70	
4	Slovmag Jelšava	34	20	5	9	51	22	+29	65	
5	Matador Púchov	34	19	4	11	59	43	+16	61	
6	Slavoj Deva Trebišov	34	17	5	12	52	45	+7	56	
7	NCHZ Nováky	34	14	9	11	43	32	+11	51	
8	PFK Piešťany	34	15	5	14	43	49	−6	50	
9	VTJ Koba Senec	34	13	9	12	41	43	−2	48	
10	Bukóza Vranov nad Topľou (Note: 3 points deducted.)	34	14	8	12	54	39	+15	47	
11	ŠM Kohucsi Gabčíkovo	34	13	8	13	47	41	+6	47	
12	Slovan Levice	34	12	5	17	47	58	−11	41	
13	ZŤS VTJ Martin	34	10	9	15	37	49	−12	39	
14	Tesla Stropkov	34	10	6	18	35	50	−15	36	
15	EX-Hlásnik Vráble (R)	34	8	6	20	27	69	−42	30	Relegation to 3. Liga
16	Agro Hurbanovo (R)	34	9	1	24	33	78	−45	28	Relegation to 3. Liga
17	ŠKP Bratislava (R)	34	6	6	22	27	52	−25	24	Relegation to 3. Liga
18	FKM Nové Zámky (R)	34	7	0	27	29	89	−60	21	Relegation to 3. Liga

Source: RSSSF.org
Rules for classification: 1) points; 2) goal difference; 3) number of goals scored.
(C) Champions; (P) Promoted; (R) Relegated

== See also ==
- 1996–97 Slovak Superliga
