= 1997–98 Slovak Superliga =

Mars superliga
- Season: 1997–98
- Dates: 2 August 1997 – 3 June 1998
- Champions: 1.FC Košice
- Relegated: FC Lokomotíva Košice; DAC Dunajská Streda
- Champions League: 1.FC Košice
- UEFA Cup: Inter Bratislava; FC Spartak Trnava
- Intertoto Cup: Ozeta Dukla Trenčín
- Matches: 240
- Goals: 615 (2.56 per match)
- Top goalscorer: Ľubomír Luhový (17 goals)
- Biggest home win: Košice 5:0 Tatran; Košice 5:0 Prievidza; Trnava 5:0 Ružomberok
- Biggest away win: Ružomberok 0:5 Inter
- Highest scoring: Trenčín 5:3 Lokomotíva
- Average attendance: ▲4,096

The 1997–98 Slovak First Football League (known as the Mars superliga for sponsorship reasons) was the fifth season of first-tier football league in Slovakia, since its establishment in 1993. It began on 1 August 1997 and ended on 3 June 1998. 1. FC Košice were the defending champions.

== Teams ==
A total of 16 teams was contested in the league, including 14 sides from the 1996–97 season and two promoted from the 2. Liga.

FC Nitra and ZTS Kerametal Dubnica was relegated to the 1997–98 2. Liga. The two relegated teams were replaced by MŠK SCP Ružomberok and Ozeta Dukla Trenčín.

=== Stadiums and locations ===
Location of teams in 1997–98 Mars superliga

Team	Home city	Stadium	Capacity
1. FC Košice	Košice	Lokomotíva Stadium	9,000
Artmedia Petržalka	Bratislava	Štadión Petržalka	7,500
BSC JAS Bardejov	Bardejov	Mestský štadión Bardejov	3,040
Chemlon Humenné	Humenné	Chemlon Stadion	10,000
Dukla Banská Bystrica	Banská Bystrica	SNP Stadium	10,000
DAC 1904 Dunajská Streda	Dunajská Streda	Mestský štadión - DAC Dunajská Streda	16,410
Inter Slovnaft Bratislava	Bratislava	Štadión Pasienky	12,000
Lokomotíva Košice	Košice	Lokomotíva Stadium	9,000
MFK Petrimex Prievidza	Prievidza	Futbalový štadión Prievidza	6,000
MFK SCP Ružomberok	Ružomberok	Štadión MFK Ružomberok	4,817
MŠK Žilina	Žilina	Štadión pod Dubňom	11,181
Ozeta Dukla Trenčín	Trenčín	Štadión na Sihoti	4,500
Slovan Bratislava	Bratislava	Tehelné pole	30,085
Spartak Trnava	Trnava	Štadión Antona Malatinského	18,448
Tatran Prešov	Prešov	Tatran Štadión	14,000
Tauris Rimavská Sobota	Rimavská Sobota	Na Zahradkach Stadium	5,000

== League table ==
Pos	Team	Pld	W	D	L	GF	GA	GD	Pts	Qualification or relegation
1	1. FC Košice (C)	30	21	5	4	71	24	+47	68	Qualification for Champions League first qualifying round
2	Spartak Trnava	30	20	6	4	61	34	+27	66	Qualification for Cup Winners' Cup qualifying round
3	Inter Bratislava	30	18	6	6	55	25	+30	60	Qualification for UEFA Cup first qualifying round
4	Ozeta Dukla Trenčín	30	16	5	9	47	31	+16	53	Qualification for Intertoto Cup first round
5	Slovan Bratislava	30	12	9	9	41	36	+5	45	
6	Rimavská Sobota	30	12	8	10	39	34	+5	44	Qualification for Intertoto Cup first round
7	Žilina	30	11	9	10	23	25	−2	42	
8	Artmedia Petržalka	30	11	6	13	27	28	−1	39	
9	Humenné	30	12	2	16	36	55	−19	38	
10	Tatran Prešov	30	9	9	12	29	39	−10	36	
11	Ružomberok	30	9	9	12	35	49	−14	36	
12	Petrimex Prievidza	30	9	8	13	35	42	−7	35	
13	Dukla Banská Bystrica	30	7	9	14	32	46	−14	30	
14	Bardejov	30	7	6	17	27	42	−15	27	
15	Lokomotíva Košice (R)	30	7	5	18	31	54	−23	26	Relegation to 2. Liga
16	DAC Dunajská Streda (R)	30	5	6	19	26	51	−25	21	Relegation to 2. Liga

Source: RSSSF.org
Rules for classification: 1) points; 2) goal difference; 3) number of goals scored.
(C) Champions; (R) Relegated

== Results ==
Home \ Away	ART	BB	BAR	DAC	HUM	INT	KOŠ	LOK	PRE	PRI	RIM	RUŽ	SLO	TRE	TRN	ŽIL
Artmedia Petržalka		1–1	2–0	4–1	0–2	2–0	1–3	3–0	0–1	1–0	2–1	3–2	1–2	0–0	0–1	1–0
Dukla Banská Bystrica	3–1		1–1	2–1	0–1	1–0	1–3	1–2	1–1	1–1	1–1	0–0	2–1	2–0	0–2	0–1
BSC JAS Bardejov	0–0	1–0		0–0	3–1	1–1	1–2	1–0	2–0	3–1	0–1	0–2	3–0	0–2	1–2	0–0
DAC Dunajská Streda	0–1	2–1	1–0		4–0	0–1	2–1	1–1	0–0	1–0	1–2	1–1	1–1	2–5	0–2	1–1
Humenné	0–2	3–2	2–1	2–1		0–1	0–3	2–0	2–1	2–1	3–0	4–1	1–5	2–0	1–3	0–0
Inter Bratislava	2–1	3–1	4–0	5–1	2–0		2–0	3–0	2–1	4–0	2–1	3–0	2–3	2–1	2–0	0–0
1. FC Košice	1–0	4–1	2–0	4–1	3–2	1–1		5–1	5–0	5–0	2–2	1–1	2–0	3–1	4–0	3–0
Lokomotíva Košice	0–1	1–1	3–1	1–0	2–0	1–2	0–3		0–1	1–2	3–1	4–1	0–0	1–2	1–1	1–1
Prešov	2–0	3–1	2–2	1–0	0–1	2–2	0–3	2–0		2–2	0–1	0–0	3–0	0–0	0–2	1–0
Petrimex Prievidza	1–0	0–0	1–0	3–0	3–0	2–2	0–1	3–2	1–1		1–0	3–1	2–2	0–0	3–0	0–1
Rimavská Sobota	1–0	4–2	1–0	3–1	2–1	0–1	1–3	3–0	1–1	0–0		5–1	2–2	1–1	0–0	3–0
Ružomberok	0–0	0–0	1–2	2–0	3–0	0–5	1–1	1–3	4–1	2–1	0–1		3–2	2–0	1–2	2–1
Slovan Bratislava	0–0	1–3	3–2	1–0	4–1	2–0	2–0	3–0	2–0	1–0	0–0	0–0		0–3	0–0	4–0
Ozeta Dukla Trenčín	0–0	0–1	2–0	1–0	4–1	1–0	0–1	5–3	3–1	2–1	2–1	1–3	1–0		2–3	1–0
Spartak Trnava	2–0	5–2	3–2	4–3	2–2	2–0	2–2	2–0	2–1	4–2	3–0	5–0	4–0	1–4		1–0
Žilina	2–0	2–0	2–0	1–0	2–0	1–1	1–0	2–0	0–1	3–2	1–0	0–0	0–0	0–3	1–1	

Source: RSSSF.org
Legend: Blue = home team win; Yellow = draw; Red = away team win.

== Season statistics ==
=== Top scorers ===
Rank	Player	Club	Goals
1	(Slovakia) Ľubomír Luhový	Trnava	17
2	(Slovakia) Martin Fabuš	Trenčín	16
3	(Slovakia) Jozef Kožlej	1.FC Košice	14
4	(Slovakia) Szilárd Németh	1.FC Košice	13
5	(Slovakia) Marek Ujlaky	Trnava	10
5	(Slovakia) Peter Babnič	Banská Bystrica(1)/Inter(9)	10
5	(Slovakia) Tomáš Medveď	Lokomotiva(2)/Slovan(8)	10
8	(Slovakia) Juraj Czinege	Inter	9
8	(Slovakia) Dušan Tittel	Slovan	9
8	(Slovakia) Ľubomír Mati	Humenne	9
8	(Slovakia) Jaroslav Timko	Trnava	9

== See also ==
- 1997–98 Slovak Cup
- 1997–98 2. Liga (Slovakia)
