= 1997–98 2. Liga (Slovakia) =

2. liga
- Season: 1997–98
- Champions: FC Nitra
- Promoted: FC Nitra; ZŤS Kerametal Dubnica n/V
- Relegated: ŠK ZŤS VTJ Martin; TJ ŠM Gabčíkovo; FAC LB Zvolen; Matadorfix Bratislava
- Matches played: 306
- Goals scored: 829 (2.71 per match)

The 1997–98 2. Liga (Slovakia) was the Slovak Second Football League (also known as 2. liga) 5th edition of the Slovak Second Football League (also known as 2. liga) professional football competition. It began on 3 August 1997 and ended on 13 June 1998.

== League standing ==
Pos	Team	Pld	W	D	L	GF	GA	GD	Pts	Promotion or relegation
1	FC Nitra (C, P)	34	20	8	6	73	36	+37	68	Promotion to Mars superliga
2	ZŤS Kerametal Dubnica n/V (P)	34	20	6	8	74	29	+45	66	Promotion to Mars superliga
3	Matador Púchov	34	14	14	6	52	34	+18	56	
4	Tatran ŠKP Devín	34	15	11	8	50	38	+12	56	
5	Slovan Duslo Šaľa	34	17	3	14	58	47	+11	54	
6	Slovmag Jelšava	34	16	5	13	47	42	+5	53	
7	Steel Trans Ličartovce	34	15	6	13	45	45	0	51	
8	NCHZ-DAK Nováky	34	13	10	11	38	32	+6	49	
9	Tesla Stropkov	34	14	7	13	37	38	−1	49	
10	PFK Piešťany	34	13	8	13	42	45	−3	47	
11	VTJ Koba Senec	34	13	8	13	36	40	−4	47	
12	Slavoj Trebišov	34	13	7	14	32	42	−10	46	
13	Bukóza Vranov nad Topľou	34	11	10	13	55	48	+7	43	
14	Slovan Levice	34	11	10	13	45	50	−5	43	
15	ZŤS VTJ Martin (R)	34	10	10	14	49	65	−16	40	Relegation to 3. Liga
16	TJ ŠM Gabčíkovo (R)	34	11	6	17	41	61	−20	39	Relegation to 3. Liga
17	FAC LB Zvolen (R)	34	7	3	24	32	59	−27	24	Relegation to 3. Liga
18	Matadorfix Bratislava (R)	34	4	6	24	29	84	−55	18	Relegation to 3. Liga

Source: RSSSF.org
Rules for classification: 1) points; 2) goal difference; 3) number of goals scored.
(C) Champions; (P) Promoted; (R) Relegated

== See also ==
- 1997–98 Slovak Superliga
