= 1996–97 Slovak Superliga =

1. Liga
- Season: 1996–97
- Dates: 3 August 1996 – 11 June 1997
- Champions: 1.FC Košice
- Relegated: FC Nitra; ZŤS Dubnica
- Champions League: 1.FC Košice
- UEFA Cup: FC Spartak Trnava; ŠK Slovan Bratislava
- Intertoto Cup: Ozeta Dukla Trenčín; FC Rimavská Sobota
- Matches: 240
- Goals: 605 (2.52 per match)
- Top goalscorer: Jozef Kožlej (22 goals)
- Biggest home win: Košice 5:0 Tatran; B.Bystrica 5:0 R.Sobota
- Biggest away win: Dubnica 0:5 Slovan
- Highest scoring: Humenné 3:6 B.Bystrica
- Average attendance: ▲4,083

The 1996–97 Slovak First Football League was the fourth season of first-tier football league in Slovakia, since its establishment in 1993. It began on 3 August 1996 and ended on 11 June 1997. Slovan Bratislava were the defending champions.

== Teams ==
A total of 16 teams was contested in the league, including 12 sides from the 1995–96 season and four promoted from the 2. Liga.

No team was relegated to the 1996–97 2. Liga due to the decision of the organization of 1. Liga, that the number of teams in the league should be expanded from 12 to 16 teams from that season. The fourth teams who are promoted from 1995–96 2. Liga are Artmedia Petržalka, MŠK Žilina, Rimavská Sobota and ZTS Kerametal Dubnica.

Spartak Trnava was the favorite to win the title after leading first all season, but after a controversial 2-1 loss and an overturned penalty for Spartak in the last round in Rimavská Sobota, Spartak finished second behind Košice. It is believed that the Rezešovci mafia family from Košice were involved, though nothing was ever proven and no player was punished.

=== Stadiums and locations ===
Location of teams in 1996–97 1. Liga

Team	Home city	Stadium	Capacity
1. FC Košice	Košice	Všešportový areál	30,312
Artmedia Petržalka	Petržalka	Štadión Petržalka	7,500
BSC JAS Bardejov	Bardejov	Mestský štadión Bardejov	3,040
Chemlon Humenné	Humenné	Chemlon Stadion	10,000
Dukla Banská Bystrica	Banská Bystrica	SNP Stadium	10,000
DAC 1904 Dunajská Streda	Dunajská Streda	Mestský štadión - DAC Dunajská Streda	16,410
Inter Slovnaft Bratislava	Bratislava	Štadión Pasienky	12,000
Lokomotíva Košice	Košice	Lokomotíva Stadium	9,000
FC Nitra	Nitra	Štadión pod Zoborom	11,384
MFK Petrimex Prievidza	Prievidza	Futbalový štadión Prievidza	6,000
MŠK Žilina	Žilina	Štadión pod Dubňom	11,181
Slovan Bratislava	Bratislava	Tehelné pole	30,085
Spartak Trnava	Trnava	Štadión Antona Malatinského	18,448
Tatran Prešov	Prešov	Tatran Štadión	14,000
Tauris Rimavská Sobota	Rimavská Sobota	Na Zahradkach Stadium	5,000
ZTS Kerametal Dubnica	Dubnica	Štadión Zimný	5,450

== League table ==
Pos	Team	Pld	W	D	L	GF	GA	GD	Pts	Qualification or relegation
1	1. FC Košice (C)	30	21	7	2	61	19	+42	70	Qualification for Champions League first qualifying round
2	Spartak Trnava	30	21	6	3	66	24	+42	69	Qualification for UEFA Cup first qualifying round
3	Slovan Bratislava	30	15	5	10	49	33	+16	50	Qualification for Cup Winners' Cup qualifying round
4	Inter Bratislava	30	13	9	8	38	35	+3	48	
5	Dukla Banská Bystrica	30	13	5	12	48	37	+11	44	
6	Tatran Prešov	30	12	7	11	37	38	−1	43	
7	Bardejov	30	11	7	12	34	36	−2	40	
8	Petrimex Prievidza	30	10	7	13	41	43	−2	37	
9	Žilina	30	11	4	15	30	34	−4	37	Qualification for Intertoto Cup group stage
10	Lokomotíva Košice	30	8	13	9	27	31	−4	37	
11	Chemlon Humenné	30	11	3	16	34	44	−10	36	
12	Rimavská Sobota	30	11	3	16	31	46	−15	36	
13	Artmedia Petržalka	30	9	8	13	29	49	−20	35	
14	DAC Dunajská Streda	30	9	7	14	29	45	−16	34	
15	ZTS Kerametal Dubnica (R)	30	8	8	14	29	43	−14	32	Relegation to 2. Liga
16	Nitra (R)	30	5	5	20	22	48	−26	20	Relegation to 2. Liga

Source: RSSSF.org
Rules for classification: 1) points; 2) goal difference; 3) number of goals scored.
(C) Champions; (R) Relegated

== Results ==
Home \ Away	ART	BB	BAR	DAC	DUB	HUM	INT	KOŠ	LOK	NIT	PRE	PRI	RIM	SLO	TRN	ŽIL
Artmedia Petržalka		3–2	0–0	3–2	1–0	1–1	2–0	0–2	1–0	1–0	0–0	3–2	3–1	1–2	0–2	1–1
Dukla Banská Bystrica	3–0		0–1	1–0	2–2	1–0	2–4	1–2	3–0	3–0	2–1	2–1	5–0	2–3	0–1	2–0
Bardejov	0–0	1–1		2–0	3–1	0–2	1–1	0–0	2–1	3–0	1–2	3–2	0–0	1–0	2–1	1–0
DAC Dunajská Streda	2–1	1–0	2–3		2–1	4–1	0–2	0–3	1–1	2–0	2–2	1–1	2–1	0–0	1–3	1–0
ZTS Dubnica	2–0	1–1	3–2	4–0		2–0	1–0	1–1	0–0	1–0	0–0	1–3	0–1	0–5	0–1	1–0
Chemlon Humenné	0–0	3–6	3–0	1–0	3–0		0–1	0–1	1–0	2–0	0–1	3–1	2–1	2–1	0–0	3–1
Inter Bratislava	3–2	0–3	1–1	3–0	1–1	1–0		3–1	1–1	3–1	2–1	3–1	1–0	0–2	0–3	1–0
1. FC Košice	3–1	3–1	2–0	1–0	0–0	2–0	2–0		1–1	1–0	5–0	4–2	2–0	4–1	2–2	4–0
Lokomotíva Košice	2–0	0–0	1–0	0–0	2–0	1–3	2–2	1–2		1–0	1–1	1–1	2–1	2–2	1–1	0–1
Nitra	0–1	0–1	3–1	1–1	0–3	3–1	0–0	0–4	0–0		0–1	0–1	4–1	2–0	0–0	3–1
Prešov	1–1	2–0	1–4	0–0	2–2	3–0	2–0	2–1	0–1	1–0		2–3	3–1	2–0	1–3	0–2
Petrimex Prievidza	4–0	3–1	1–0	1–2	2–0	2–1	1–1	1–2	1–1	2–2	0–2		2–0	2–0	0–3	1–1
Rimavská Sobota	1–1	2–0	1–0	4–0	2–1	2–1	1–3	0–2	1–2	3–0	1–3	1–0		1–0	2–1	1–0
Slovan Bratislava	4–0	1–1	2–0	1–2	4–0	2–0	1–1	2–2	0–1	4–1	2–1	2–0	2–0		3–1	1–0
Spartak Trnava	5–2	2–1	3–2	2–1	4–1	4–0	3–0	0–0	1–0	4–2	3–0	0–0	3–0	4–0		3–1
Žilina	4–0	0–1	2–0	2–0	1–0	3–1	0–0	0–2	4–1	1–0	1–0	1–0	1–1	0–2	2–3	

Source: RSSSF.org
Legend: Blue = home team win; Yellow = draw; Red = away team win.

== Season statistics ==
=== Top scorers ===
Rank	Player	Club	Goals
1	(Slovakia) Jozef Kožlej	1.FC Kosice	22
2	(Slovakia) Július Šimon	Trnava	14
3	(Slovakia) Szilárd Németh	Slovan	12
4	(Austria) Rolf Landerl	Inter	10
5	(Slovakia) Ľubomír Luhový	Trnava	9
5	(Slovakia) Róbert Semeník	1.FC Kosice	9
5	(Slovakia) Jozef Pisár	Rimavska Sobota	9
5	(Slovakia) Ivan Lapšanský	B.Bystrica	9
5	(Slovakia) Milan Rimanovský	DAC D.Streda	9
5	(Slovakia) Jaroslav Timko	Trnava	9

== See also ==
- 1996–97 Slovak Cup
- 1996–97 2. Liga (Slovakia)
