= 2007–08 Slovak First League =

1. liga
- Season: 2007–08
- Champions: 1. FC Tatran Prešov
- Promoted: 1. FC Tatran Prešov
- Relegated: FK Slavoj Trebišov; MFK Goral Stará Ľubovňa
- Matches: 198
- Goals: 512 (2.59 per match)

The 2007–08 season of the Slovak First League (also known as 1. liga) was the sixteenth season of the league since its establishment. It began in late July 2007 and ended in May 2008.

== Team changes from 2006–07 ==
- Promoted in Corgoň Liga: ↑Zlaté Moravce↑
- Relegated from Corgoň Liga: ↓Inter Bratislava↓
- Promoted in 1. liga: ↑Prievidza↑, ↑Stará Ľubovňa↑, ↑Trebišov↑
- Relegated from 1. liga: ↓Močenok×↓, ↓Dunajská Streda↓, ↓Turčianske Teplice↓

× - withdrew from league

=== Stadiums and locations ===
Location of teams in Slovak First League 2007–08

== League table ==
Pos	Team	Pld	W	D	L	GF	GA	GD	Pts	Promotion or relegation
1	Prešov (C, P)	33	23	8	2	64	14	+50	77	Promotion to Corgoň Liga
2	Podbrezová	33	15	10	8	49	34	+15	55	
3	Inter Bratislava	33	15	8	10	49	40	+9	53	
4	Lučenec	33	15	6	12	53	45	+8	51	
5	Rimavská Sobota	33	13	11	9	40	32	+8	50	
6	Prievidza	33	11	10	12	46	56	−10	43	
7	Šaľa	33	11	8	14	41	46	−5	41	
8	Košice B	33	10	7	16	41	47	−6	37	
9	Zemplín Michalovce	33	11	4	18	33	43	−10	37	
10	Humenné	33	8	12	13	30	37	−7	36	
11	Trebišov (R)	33	9	7	17	31	60	−29	34	Relegation to 2. liga
12	Stará Ľubovňa (R)	33	7	9	17	35	58	−23	30	Relegation to 2. liga

Source: RSSSF.org
Rules for classification: 1) points; 2) goal difference; 3) number of goals scored.
(C) Champions; (P) Promoted; (R) Relegated

== Top goalscorers ==
Rank	Player	Club	Goals
1	(Slovakia) Tomáš Majtán	Inter	16
2	(Slovakia) Róbert Tomko	Podbrezová	13
3	(Slovakia) Jozef Pisár	R. Sobota	11
3	(Slovakia) Dušan Uškovič	Prievidza	11
3	(Slovakia) Ladislav Belkovics	D. Streda B	11
3	(Slovakia) Miroslav Kasaj	Ružomberok B	11

== See also ==
- 2007–08 Slovak Superliga
