= 1998–99 2. Liga (Slovakia) =

2. liga
- Season: 1998–99
- Champions: DAC 1904 Dunajská Streda
- Promoted: DAC 1904 Dunajská Streda; FK VTJ Koba Senec
- Relegated: ŠK Slovmag Jelšava; FK Slavoj Trebišov; Zemplín VTJ Michalovce; Bukocel Vranov nad Topľou
- Matches played: 306
- Goals scored: 761 (2.49 per match)

The 1998–99 2. Liga (Slovakia) was the Slovak Second Football League (also known as 2. liga) 6th edition of the Slovak Second Football League (also known as 2. liga) professional football competition. It began on 1 August 1998 and ended on 13 June 1999.

== League standing ==
Pos	Team	Pld	W	D	L	GF	GA	GD	Pts	Promotion or relegation
1	DAC Dunajská Streda (C, P)	34	21	6	7	62	29	+33	69	Promotion to Mars superliga
2	VTJ Koba Senec (P)	34	19	11	4	44	23	+21	68	Promotion to Mars superliga
3	Tatran ŠKP Devín	34	20	7	7	65	36	+29	67	
4	Matador Púchov	34	18	11	5	51	21	+30	65	
5	Slovan Bratislava B	34	16	8	10	49	40	+9	56	
6	PFK Piešťany	34	15	5	14	43	42	+1	50	
7	Podbrezová	34	14	7	13	37	36	+1	49	
8	Steel Trans Ličartovce	34	13	9	12	38	38	0	48	
9	NCHZ-DAK Nováky	34	14	5	15	51	41	+10	47	
10	Tesla Stropkov	34	14	4	16	36	40	−4	46	
11	Slovan Levice	34	13	6	15	43	40	+3	45	
12	Lokomotíva Košice	34	12	9	13	38	37	+1	45	
13	Slovan Duslo Šaľa	34	12	8	14	48	49	−1	44	
14	FKM Nové Zámky	34	12	7	15	41	48	−7	43	
15	Slovmag Jelšava (R)	34	9	9	16	29	48	−19	36	Relegation to 3. Liga
16	Slavoj Trebišov (R)	34	9	3	22	30	58	−28	30	Relegation to 3. Liga
17	Zemplín VTJ Michalovce (R)	34	7	8	19	33	60	−27	29	Relegation to 3. Liga
18	Bukocel Vranov nad Topľou (R)	34	4	5	25	23	75	−52	17	Relegation to 3. Liga

Source: RSSSF.org
Rules for classification: 1) points; 2) goal difference; 3) number of goals scored.
(C) Champions; (P) Promoted; (R) Relegated

== See also ==
- 1998–99 Slovak Superliga
