= 2001–02 Slovak Superliga =

Mars superliga
- Season: 2001–02
- Dates: 14 July 2001 – 8 June 2002
- Champions: MŠK Žilina
- Relegated: Tatran Prešov
- Champions League: MŠK Žilina
- UEFA Cup: Matador Púchov; Koba Senec
- Intertoto Cup: Ozeta Dukla Trenčín
- Matches: 180
- Goals: 453 (2.52 per match)
- Top goalscorer: Marek Mintál (21 goals)
- Biggest home win: Žilina 6:0 Prešov
- Biggest away win: Košice 0:4 Žilina; Košice 0:4 Dubnica; Košice 0:4 Žilina
- Highest scoring: Petržalka 6:3 Slovan
- Average attendance: ▼3,448

The 2001–02 Slovak First Football League (known as the Mars superliga for sponsorship reasons) was the ninth season of first-tier football league in Slovakia, since its establishment in 1993. It began on 14 July 2001 and ended on 8 June 2002. AŠK Inter Slovnaft Bratislava were the defending champions.

== Teams ==
A total of 10 teams was contested in the league, including 9 sides from the 2000–01 season and one promoted from the 2. Liga.

Relegation for FC Spartak Trnava to the 2001–02 2. Liga was confirmed on 8 June 2001. The one relegated team were replaced by ZTS Dubnica nad Váhom.

=== Stadiums and locations ===
Location of teams in 2001–02 Mars superliga

Team	Home city	Stadium	Capacity
1. FC Košice	Košice	Lokomotíva Stadium	9,000
Artmedia Petržalka	Petržalka	Štadión Petržalka	7,500
Inter Slovnaft Bratislava	Bratislava	Štadión Pasienky	12,000
Matador Púchov	Púchov	Mestský štadión	6,614
MFK SCP Ružomberok	Ružomberok	Štadión MFK Ružomberok	4,817
MŠK Žilina	Žilina	Štadión pod Dubňom	11,181
Ozeta Dukla Trenčín	Trenčín	Štadión na Sihoti	4,500
Slovan Bratislava	Bratislava	Tehelné pole	30,085
Tatran Prešov	Prešov	Tatran Štadión	14,000
ZTS Dubnica nad Váhom	Dubnica	Štadión Zimný	5,450

== League table ==
Pos	Team	Pld	W	D	L	GF	GA	GD	Pts	Qualification or relegation
1	Žilina (C)	36	21	6	9	62	37	+25	69	Qualification for Champions League second qualifying round
2	Matador Púchov	36	18	8	10	48	33	+15	62	Qualification for UEFA Cup qualifying round
3	Inter Bratislava	36	16	8	12	53	39	+14	56	
4	Ružomberok	36	15	9	12	49	41	+8	54	
5	Ozeta Dukla Trenčín	36	15	9	12	45	43	+2	54	Qualification for Intertoto Cup first round
6	Slovan Bratislava	36	14	9	13	42	39	+3	51	
7	Artmedia Petržalka	36	11	14	11	51	45	+6	47	
8	ZTS Dubnica	36	9	11	16	38	48	−10	38	
9	1. FC Košice	36	6	13	17	30	62	−32	31	
10	Tatran Prešov (R)	36	8	7	21	35	66	−31	31	Relegation to 2. Liga

Source: RSSSF.org
Rules for classification: 1) points; 2) goal difference; 3) number of goals scored.
Koba Senec from Second Division qualify for 2002–03 UEFA Cup as winner of 2001–02 Slovak Cup.
(C) Champions; (R) Relegated

== Results ==
=== First half of season ===
Home \ Away	ART	DUB	INT	KOŠ	PRE	PÚC	RUŽ	SLO	TRE	ŽIL
Artmedia Petržalka		3–0	2–2	6–1	5–1	1–0	3–2	6–3	1–1	1–4
ZTS Dubnica	2–3		1–1	1–1	1–2	0–0	0–1	0–1	2–4	2–2
Inter Bratislava	0–0	2–0		3–1	3–1	2–0	2–1	0–0	3–0	1–3
1. FC Košice	0–0	0–4	1–1		2–1	2–0	0–0	0–0	2–4	0–4
Prešov	0–0	2–2	2–4	1–1		0–3	0–1	1–0	3–0	0–1
Matador Púchov	1–1	1–1	2–1	4–1	1–1		1–2	1–1	4–0	2–1
Ružomberok	0–1	5–0	1–2	1–1	2–0	1–1		2–1	4–1	2–0
Slovan Bratislava	0–2	2–0	1–1	2–0	3–2	1–0	2–2		2–0	2–3
Ozeta Dukla Trenčín	1–1	2–1	0–0	3–0	1–0	0–2	1–1	2–0		2–0
Žilina	2–1	2–0	1–1	2–0	2–1	0–1	2–0	0–0	3–2	

Source: RSSSF.org
Legend: Blue = home team win; Yellow = draw; Red = away team win.

=== Second half of season ===
Home \ Away	ART	DUB	INT	KOŠ	PRE	PÚC	RUŽ	SLO	TRE	ŽIL
Artmedia Petržalka		1–1	0–3	1–1	3–0	0–3	1–2	1–1	1–1	1–1
ZTS Dubnica	1–0		1–0	1–0	3–2	4–1	2–1	1–1	1–1	0–1
Inter Bratislava	1–2	1–2		2–0	3–0	0–1	2–3	0–2	0–2	2–0
1. FC Košice	0–0	1–0	2–0		2–1	2–2	3–3	1–1	0–1	0–4
Prešov	1–0	1–1	0–1	2–1		2–1	2–0	0–2	1–3	3–2
Matador Púchov	2–0	1–0	1–0	1–0	2–0		1–0	3–1	0–2	1–1
Ružomberok	4–2	1–0	1–2	0–0	0–0	1–0		1–0	2–1	0–0
Slovan Bratislava	1–0	0–3	1–2	3–1	2–0	3–0	1–0		0–1	2–1
Ozeta Dukla Trenčín	0–0	0–0	2–1	0–1	2–2	1–2	3–1	1–0		0–1
Žilina	2–1	1–0	2–4	3–2	6–0	0–2	3–1	1–0	1–0	

Source: RSSSF.org
Legend: Blue = home team win; Yellow = draw; Red = away team win.

== Season statistics ==
=== Top scorers ===
Rank	Player	Club	Goals
1	(Slovakia) Marek Mintál	Žilina	21
2	(Slovakia) Ľuboš Perniš	Matador Púchov	15
3	(Slovakia) Róbert Vittek	Slovan Bratislava	14
4	(Slovakia) Henrich Benčík	Artmedia Petržalka	12
5	(Slovakia) Miroslav Nemec	Žilina	10
6	(Slovakia) Ľubomír Reiter	Žilina	9
6	(Slovakia) Tomáš Oravec	SCP Ružomberok	9
6	(Slovakia) Miroslav Drobňák	Inter Bratislava	9
6	(Slovakia) Martin Fabuš	Ozeta Dukla Trenčín	9
6	(Slovakia) Mário Breška	Matador Púchov	9

== See also ==
- 2001–02 Slovak Cup
- 2001–02 2. Liga (Slovakia)
