= 2008–09 Slovak Superliga =

Corgoň Liga
- Season: 2008–09
- Dates: 19 July 2008 – 30 May 2009
- Champions: Slovan Bratislava; 5th title
- Relegated: ViOn Zlaté Moravce
- Champions League: Slovan Bratislava
- Europa League: Žilina; Spartak Trnava; Košice
- Matches: 198
- Goals: 516 (2.61 per match)
- Top goalscorer: (Slovakia) Pavol Masaryk (14)
- Biggest home win: Slovan 6:0 Zlaté Moravce; Slovan 6:0 D.Streda
- Biggest away win: Z.Moravce 0:5 Petržalka
- Highest scoring: Košice 5:5 Prešov
- Average attendance: ▼3,009

The 2008–09 Slovak Superliga (known as the Slovak Corgoň Liga for sponsorship reasons) was the 16th season of first-tier football league in Slovakia, since its establishment in 1993. It began on 19 July 2008 and ended on 30 May 2009. FC Artmedia Petržalka were the defending champions.

== Teams ==
=== Promotion and relegation ===
FK AS Trenčín were relegated after concluding the last season in 12th and last place. They were replaced by the champions of the 2007–08 1. Liga, 1. FC Tatran Prešov. Also DAC Dunajská Streda, who were Western Group champions of the 2007–08 2. Liga, merged with FC Senec and took their place in Superliga.

=== Stadiums and locations ===
Location of teams in 2008–09 Corgoň Liga

Team	Home city	Stadium	Capacity
Artmedia Petržalka	Petržalka	Štadión Petržalka	7,500
Dukla Banská Bystrica	Banská Bystrica	SNP Stadium	10,000
DAC 1904 Dunajská Streda	Dunajská Streda	Mestský štadión - DAC Dunajská Streda	16,410
FC ViOn Zlaté Moravce	Zlaté Moravce	Štadión FC ViOn	3,787
FC Nitra	Nitra	Štadión pod Zoborom	11,384
MFK Košice	Košice	Lokomotíva Stadium	9,000
MFK Ružomberok	Ružomberok	Štadión MFK Ružomberok	4,817
MŠK Žilina	Žilina	Štadión pod Dubňom	11,181
Slovan Bratislava	Bratislava	Tehelné pole	30,085
Spartak Trnava	Trnava	Štadión Antona Malatinského	18,448
Tatran Prešov	Prešov	Tatran Štadión	14,000
ZTS Dubnica nad Váhom	Dubnica	Štadión Zimný	5,450

== League table ==
Pos	Team	Pld	W	D	L	GF	GA	GD	Pts	Qualification or relegation
1	Slovan Bratislava (C)	33	21	7	5	69	25	+44	70	Qualification for Champions League second qualifying round
2	Žilina	33	18	8	7	56	26	+30	62	Qualification for Europa League second qualifying round
3	Spartak Trnava	33	15	10	8	45	38	+7	55	Qualification for Europa League first qualifying round
4	Košice	33	14	10	9	48	42	+6	52	Qualification for Europa League third qualifying round (Note: Košice won the 2008–09 Slovak Cup and qualified for the third qualifying round of the UEFA Europa League.)
5	Ružomberok	33	12	11	10	48	34	+14	47	
6	Artmedia Petržalka	33	12	11	10	50	38	+12	47	
7	Tatran Prešov	33	10	11	12	40	50	−10	41	
8	ZTS Dubnica	33	10	7	16	43	49	−6	37	
9	DAC Dunajská Streda	33	9	9	15	32	59	−27	36	
10	Dukla Banská Bystrica	33	9	8	16	30	39	−9	35	
11	Nitra	33	9	8	16	34	53	−19	35	
12	ViOn Zlaté Moravce (R)	33	5	8	20	21	63	−42	23	Relegation to 1. Liga

Source: Kicker (in German)
Rules for classification: 1) points; 2) goal difference; 3) number of goals scored.
(C) Champions; (R) Relegated

== Results ==
The schedule consists of three rounds. The pairings of the first round were set according to the 2007-08 final standings. Every team played each opponent once for a total of 11 games per team. The remaining two rounds consist of a conventional home and away round-robin schedule.

=== First round ===
Key numbers for pairing determination (number marks position in final standings 2007-08):

1st round	2nd round	3rd round	4th round	5th round	6th round
1 - 12	1 - 2	2 - 12	1 - 4	3 - 12	1 - 6
2 - 11	8 - 6	3 - 1	2 - 3	4 - 2	2 - 5
3 - 10	9 - 5	4 - 11	9 - 7	5 - 1	3 - 4
4 - 9	10 - 4	5 - 10	10 - 6	6 - 11	10 - 8
5 - 8	11 - 3	6 - 9	11 - 5	7 - 10	11 - 7
6 - 7	12 - 7	7 - 8	12 - 8	8 - 9	12 - 9

7th round	8th round	9th round	10th round	11th round
4 - 12	1 - 8	5 - 12	1 - 10	6 - 12
5 - 3	2 - 7	6 - 4	2 - 9	7 - 5
6 - 2	3 - 6	7 - 3	3 - 8	8 - 4
7 - 1	4 - 5	8 - 2	4 - 7	9 - 3
8 - 11	11 - 9	9 - 1	5 - 6	10 - 2
9 - 10	12 - 10	10 - 11	12 - 11	11 - 1

Home \ Away	ART	BB	DUB	DAC	KOŠ	NIT	PRE	RUŽ	SLO	TRN	ZLM	ŽIL
Artmedia Petržalka		1–1		0–0	2–3		1–0			1–1		0–2
Dukla Banská Bystrica			1–0		0–1					0–1	0–0	1–0
ZTS Dubnica	2–1			2–2		1–2		2–0	1–3			
DAC Dunajská Streda		2–1			1–3					3–0	1–0	2–0
Košice			3–1				5–5	1–0		2–1	2–1	0–0
Nitra	1–2	1–2		2–1	2–1		1–0			1–5		
Prešov		2–0	1–4	1–0				3–2			1–0	
Ružomberok	2–0	1–0		2–2		3–0			1–1			
Slovan Bratislava	4–1	0–0		2–1	2–0	2–0	4–1					
Spartak Trnava			2–1				0–0	2–0	1–1		2–0	0–0
ViOn Zlaté Moravce	0–5		0–0			1–1		1–1	1–0			
Žilina			3–1			5–0	5–1	1–1	1–0		3–0	

Source: Kicker (in German)
Legend: Blue = home team win; Yellow = draw; Red = away team win.

=== Second and third round ===
Home \ Away	ART	BB	DUB	DAC	KOŠ	NIT	PRE	RUŽ	SLO	TRN	ZLM	ŽIL
Artmedia Petržalka		1–1	3–0	3–0	3–2	1–1	3–0	2–2	1–1	0–0	5–0	0–0
Dukla Banská Bystrica	0–1		3–0	0–0	0–0	2–1	2–1	0–2	2–3	1–2	2–1	1–1
ZTS Dubnica	0–0	2–0		3–0	3–1	4–1	0–0	1–1	0–1	0–1	1–1	2–0
DAC Dunajská Streda	0–4	1–3	1–0		2–1	1–0	2–1	3–2	0–4	1–4	1–2	0–0
Košice	1–2	0–0	2–1	1–1		0–0	1–1	2–1	0–0	2–1	2–0	3–0
Nitra	1–1	2–1	2–1	3–0	4–1		0–0	2–1	0–1	1–1	1–2	0–2
Prešov	1–0	2–1	2–3	2–1	1–2	1–1		2–2	1–2	0–0	2–1	1–0
Ružomberok	3–0	1–0	2–2	0–0	0–0	1–1	3–0		5–1	1–0	1–0	0–1
Slovan Bratislava	2–0	5–0	3–1	6–0	1–2	3–1	1–1	2–0		1–2	6–0	2–0
Spartak Trnava	4–2	2–0	0–2	1–1	2–1	3–1	0–3	0–4	1–1		3–1	1–1
ViOn Zlaté Moravce	0–3	1–5	2–0	1–1	2–2	1–0	1–1	0–3	0–3	0–1		0–2
Žilina	3–1	1–0	5–2	5–1	2–1	2–0	2–2	2–0	0–1	5–1	2–1	

Source: Kicker (in German)
Legend: Blue = home team win; Yellow = draw; Red = away team win.

== Top scorers ==
Rank	Player	Club	Goals
1	(Slovakia) Pavol Masaryk	Slovan Bratislava	15
2	(Slovakia) Ján Novák	MFK Košice	12
3	(Slovakia) Juraj Halenár	Slovan Bratislava/Petržalka	11
3	(Cameroon) Leonard Kweuke	DAC Dunajská Streda	11
3	(Slovakia) Miloš Lačný	MFK Ružomberok	11
3	(Brazil) Adauto	MŠK Žilina	11
7	(Slovakia) Tomáš Oravec	Petržalka	10
8	(Slovakia) Róbert Rák	FC Nitra	9
8	(Czech Republic) Emil Rilke	MŠK Žilina	9
8	(Slovakia) Jakub Sylvestr	Slovan Bratislava/Petržalka	9
8	(Slovakia) Ján Kozák	Slovan Bratislava/Petržalka	9
8	(Senegal) (Slovakia) Mouhamadou Seye	MFK Dubnica	9

== See also ==
- 2008–09 Slovak Cup
- 2008–09 Slovak First League
