= 2. Liga (Slovakia) =

MONACObet LIGA
- Founded: 1993
- Country: Slovakia
- Confederation: UEFA
- Number of clubs: 16
- Level on pyramid: 2
- Promotion to: Niké liga
- Relegation to: 3. liga
- Domestic cup: Slovnaft Cup
- Current champions: MFK Dukla Banská Bystrica (1st title) (2025–26)
- Most championships: Nitra; Tatran Prešov (3 titles)
- Broadcaster(s): STVR
- Website: monacobetliga.sk
- Current: 2026–27 2. Liga

The Slovak Second Football League (Slovak: 2. slovenská futbalová liga), officially known as MONACObet LIGA for sponsorship reasons, is the annual second tier football competition in Slovakia. Currently, the competition consists of 16 teams.

Each season, the first-placed team in the 2. Liga is automatically promoted to the First League, subject to meeting league requirements. The team that finishes in second place enters a two-legged play-off against the second-to-last placed team from the First League, with the winner taking their place in the following season's First League. The two lowest-finishing teams in the 2. Liga are relegated to the 3. Liga.

== History ==
The league was formed as a second-tier league in Czechoslovakia. Before the dissolution of Czechoslovakia it consisted of 16 teams. Upon dissolution, six teams were promoted to the then newly formed Slovak First League. The league was expanded to 18 teams in 1996/97 season, but returned back to 16 in 2001/02 and reduced to 12 in 2006–07. The number of teams expanded to 16 from the 2017–18 season.

In June 2014 the league signed a two-year sponsorship agreement with a gambling firm, taking the name of DOXXbet liga as part of the deal.

External events prompted adaptive measures, notably during the COVID-19 pandemic, when all Slovak football leagues, including the 2. Liga, were suspended in March 2020 following government directives to curb virus spread; the 2019–20 season resumed in June without fans, while the 2020–21 campaign featured postponed matches and enhanced health protocols under SFZ oversight.

In February 2024, the league was renamed as MONACObet LIGA as a part of a two-and-half year partnership deal with an option to extend. The deal included a further undisclosed club grant worth over €1 million, allegedly exceeding any previous partnerships.

== Current teams (2025–26) ==
Ahead of the 2025–26 season, the 2nd league and the 3rd league were reorganized by the Slovak Football Association.

Participants in the 2025-26 season:

- FC ViOn Zlaté Moravce
- FC Petržalka
- MFK Dukla Banská Bystrica
- MŠK Považská Bystrica
- MFK Tatran Liptovský Mikuláš
- MŠK Žilina B
- FK Pohronie
- FC ŠTK 1914 Šamorín
- ŠK Slovan Bratislava B
- MŠK Púchov
- OFK Dynamo Malženice
- MFK Zvolen
- Redfox FC Stará Ľubovňa
- Slávia TU Košice
- OFK Baník Lehota pod Vtáčnikom
- FK Inter Bratislava

== Winners ==
Season	Champions	Runners-up	Third placed	Top scorer	Goals	Team
1993–94	**BSC JAS Bardejov**	Slovan Levice	Slavoj Trebišov	(Slovakia) Richard Varadin	14	ŠKP Bratislava
1994–95	**FC Nitra**	Slovan Levice	Artmedia Petržalka	(Slovakia) Milan Strelec (Slovakia) Róbert Formanko	14	Artmedia Petržalka; Ozeta Dukla Trenčín
1995–96	**Artmedia Petržalka**	**MŠK Žilina**	**Rimavská Sobota**	(Slovakia) Jozef Pisár	21	Rimavská Sobota
1996–97	**MŠK Ružomberok**	**Ozeta Dukla Trenčín**	Tatran Devín	(Slovakia) Imrich Miklós	25	Tatran Devín
1997–98	**FC Nitra**	**ZTS Dubnica**	Matador Púchov	(Slovakia) Peter Hodúr	18	FC Nitra
1998–99	**DAC Dunajská Streda**	**Koba Senec**	Tatran ŠKP Devín	(Slovakia) Richard Varadin	24	Tatran ŠKP Devín
1999–00	**Matador Púchov**	NCHZ Nováky	ŽP Šport Podbrezová	(Slovakia) Jozef Pisár	22	Rimavská Sobota
2000–01	**ZTS Dubnica**	FC Nitra	ŽP Šport Podbrezová	(Slovakia) Mário Breška	23	FC Nitra
2001–02	**Spartak Trnava**	Steel Trans Ličartovce	Rimavská Sobota	(Slovakia) Ivan Bartoš (Slovakia) Jozef Jelšic	17	Dukla Banská Bystrica; FC Nitra
2002–03	**Dukla Banská Bystrica**	Steel Trans Ličartovce	Koba Senec	(Slovakia) Peter Bugár	17	Topvar Topoľčany
2003–04	**Rimavská Sobota**	Steel Trans Ličartovce	Tatran Prešov	(Slovakia) Peter Iskra	18	Rimavská Sobota
2004–05	**FC Nitra**	Steel Trans Ličartovce	Slovan Bratislava	(Slovakia) Róbert Rák	27	FC Nitra
2005–06	**MFK Košice**	**Slovan Bratislava**	**FC Senec**	(Slovakia) Pavol Piatka	22	MFK Košice
2006–07	**ViOn Zlaté Moravce**	Eldus Močenok	Rimavská Sobota	(Slovakia) Jozef Pisár	15	Rimavská Sobota
2007–08	**Tatran Prešov**	ŽP Šport Podbrezová	Inter Bratislava	(Slovakia) Tomáš Majtán	16	Inter Bratislava
2008–09	**Inter Bratislava**	AS Trenčín	ŽP Šport Podbrezová	(Argentina) David Depetris	21	FK AS Trenčín
2009–10	**ViOn Zlaté Moravce**	AS Trenčín	FK Púchov	(Slovakia) Karol Pavelka	16	Zlaté Moravce
2010–11	**AS Trenčín**	Rimavská Sobota	Petržalka	(Argentina) David Depetris	31	FK AS Trenčín
2011–12	**Spartak Myjava**	ŽP Šport Podbrezová	Dolný Kubín	(Slovakia) Peter Sládek (Slovakia) Tomáš Čekovský	14	Spartak Myjava; Podbrezová
2012–13	**DAC Dunajská Streda**	ŽP Šport Podbrezová	SFM Senec	(Nigeria) Hector Tubonemi	19	Podbrezová
2013–14	**ŽP Šport Podbrezová**	Zemplín Michalovce	Partizán Bardejov	(Slovakia) Michal Hamuľak	26	Zemplín Michalovce
2014–15	**Zemplín Michalovce**	**MFK Skalica**	Tatran Prešov	(Slovakia) Matúš Paukner	21	FC Nitra
2015–16	**Tatran Prešov**	VSS Košice	Tatran Liptovský Mikuláš	(Serbia) Marko Milunović	19	Partizán Bardejov
2016–17	VSS Košice^{1}	**FC Nitra**	MFK Skalica	(Brazil) Peu	23	FC ŠTK 1914 Šamorín
2017–18	**ŠKF Sereď**	MFK Skalica	FK Poprad	(Slovakia) Michal Hamuľak	20	Partizán Bardejov
2018–19	**FK Pohronie**	FK Poprad	MFK Skalica	(Serbia) Samir Nurković (Montenegro) Miladin Vujošević	23	KFC Komárno; FK Dubnica
2019–20	FK Dubnica	Dukla Banská Bystrica	MFK Skalica	(Czech Republic) Roman Haša	14	MFK Skalica
2020–21	**Tatran Liptovský Mikuláš**	Dukla Banská Bystrica	MFK Skalica	(Nigeria) Wisdom Kanu	18	Slavoj Trebišov
2021–22	**Železiarne Podbrezová**	**Dukla Banská Bystrica**	**MFK Skalica**	(Slovakia) Marek Kuzma	22	FK Dubnica; Železiarne Podbrezová
2022–23	**FC Košice**	Tatran Prešov	KFC Komárno	(Slovakia) Jozef Dolný	19	Tatran Prešov
2023–24	**KFC Komárno**	FC Petržalka	Tatran Prešov	(Slovakia) Jozef Dolný	18	Tatran Prešov
2024–25	**Tatran Prešov**	Zlaté Moravce	Liptovský Mikuláš	(Senegal) Landing Sagna	12	Tatran Prešov
2025–26	**Dukla Banská Bystrica**	MFK Zvolen	Liptovský Mikuláš	(Slovakia) Jakub Sylvestr	22	MFK Zvolen

- **Bold** denotes team earned promotion.

^{1}FC VSS Košice did not meet club license rules and they went into bankruptcy.

== Performance by club ==
Club	Winners	Promoted	Promoting Years
FC Nitra	3	4	1994–95, 1997–98, 2004–05, 2016–17
Tatran Prešov	3	3	2007–08, 2015–16, 2024–25
ZTS Dubnica	2	3	1995–96, 1997–98, 2000–01
Dukla Banská Bystrica	2	3	2002–03, 2021–22, 2025–26
ViOn Zlaté Moravce	2	2	2006–07, 2009–10
DAC Dunajská Streda	2	2	1998–99, 2012–13
Podbrezová	2	2	2013–14, 2021–22
FC VSS Košice	2	1^{2}	2005–06
FK AS Trenčín	1	2	1996–97, 2010–11
Rimavská Sobota	1	2	1995–96, 2003–04
Koba Senec	0	2	1998–99, 2005–06
Zemplín Michalovce	1	1	2014–15
Artmedia Petržalka	1	1	1995–96
BSC JAS Bardejov	1	1	1993–94
MŠK Ružomberok	1	1	1996–97
Matador Púchov	1	1	1999–00
Spartak Myjava	1	1	2011–12
Spartak Trnava	1	1	2001–02
ŠKF Sereď	1	1	2017–18
FK Pohronie	1	1	2018–19
Liptovský Mikuláš	1	1	2020–21
FC Košice	1	1	2022–23
KFC Komárno	1	1	2023–24
MFK Skalica	0	2	2014–15, 2021–22
MŠK Žilina	0	1	1995–96
Slovan Bratislava	0	1	2005–06
Inter Bratislava	1	0 ^{1}	

^{1}- Inter Bratislava won league in 2008–09, but license was sold to FK Senica.
^{2}- FC VSS Košice won league in 2016–17, but did not meet club license rules and they went into bankruptcy.
