= 2001–02 2. Liga (Slovakia) =

2. liga
- Season: 2001–02
- Champions: FC Spartak Trnava
- Promoted: FC Spartak Trnava
- Relegated: FK NCHZ Nováky; ZSNP Žiar nad Hronom; Bukocel Vranov nad Topľou; Calex Zlaté Moravce
- UEFA Cup: FK VTJ Koba Senec (via domestic cup)
- Matches: 240
- Goals: 595 (2.48 per match)

The 2001–02 season of the Slovak Second Football League (also known as 2. liga) was the ninth season of the league since its establishment. It began on 28 July 2001 and ended on 8 June 2002.

== League standing ==
Pos	Team	Pld	W	D	L	GF	GA	GD	Pts	Promotion or relegation
1	Spartak Trnava (C, P)	30	18	7	5	61	22	+39	61	Promotion to Slovak Superliga
2	Steel Trans Ličartovce	30	15	9	6	47	28	+19	54	
3	Rimavská Sobota	30	14	10	6	40	31	+9	52	
4	NCHZ Nováky (R)	30	14	8	8	47	29	+18	50	Relegation to 3. Liga
5	Podbrezová	30	13	6	11	29	23	+6	45	
6	Dukla Banská Bystrica	30	11	11	8	44	32	+12	44	
7	FC Nitra	30	12	7	11	41	34	+7	43	
8	DAC 1904 Dunajská Streda	30	11	10	9	42	38	+4	43	
9	Slovan Bratislava B	30	12	7	11	34	32	+2	43	
10	VTJ Koba Senec (Note: 3 points deducted.)	30	12	9	9	36	27	+9	42	Qualification for UEFA Cup qualifying round (Note: VTJ Koba Senec qualified as the winner of 2001–02 Slovak Cup.)
11	1. HFC Humenné	30	10	9	11	35	38	−3	39	
12	Tatran ŠKP Devín	30	10	9	11	34	41	−7	39	
13	Žiar nad Hronom (R)	30	9	9	12	36	36	0	36	Relegation to 3. Liga
14	VTJ Topoľčany	30	8	12	10	33	37	−4	36	
15	Bukocel Vranov nad Topľou (R)	30	2	10	18	21	62	−41	16	Relegation to 3. Liga
16	Calex Zlaté Moravce (Note: 12 points deducted.) (R)	30	0	5	25	15	85	−70	−7	Relegation to 3. Liga

Source: RSSSF.org
Rules for classification: 1) points; 2) goal difference; 3) number of goals scored.
(C) Champions; (P) Promoted; (R) Relegated

== See also ==
- 2001–02 Slovak Superliga
