= 2008–09 Slovak First League =

1. liga
- Season: 2008–09
- Champions: FK Inter Bratislava
- Promoted: FK Inter Bratislava
- Relegated: MFK Košice B; DAC Dunajská Streda B
- Matches: 198
- Goals: 531 (2.68 per match)
- Top goalscorer: David Depetris (21 goals)

The 2008–09 Slovak First League season was the 9th edition of the Slovak First League (also known as 1. liga) annual football tournament. It began in late July 2008 and ended in June 2009.

== Team changes from 2007–08 ==
- Promoted in Corgoň Liga: ↑Prešov↑
- Relegated from Corgoň Liga: ↓Trenčín↓
- Promoted in 1. liga: ↑Dunajská Streda↑, ↑Ružomberok↑
- Relegated from 1. liga: ↓Trebišov↓, ↓Stará Ľubovňa↓

=== Stadiums and locations ===
Location of teams in Slovak First League 2008–09

== League table ==
Pos	Team	Pld	W	D	L	GF	GA	GD	Pts	Promotion or relegation
1	Inter Bratislava (C, P)	33	19	10	4	64	27	+37	67	Promotion to Corgoň Liga and then merger before the season
2	Trenčín	33	19	9	5	74	27	+47	66	
3	Podbrezová	33	20	5	8	51	24	+27	65	
4	Lučenec	33	16	7	10	54	44	+10	55	
5	Rimavská Sobota	33	14	7	12	37	29	+8	49	
6	Prievidza	33	13	7	13	43	40	+3	46	
7	Šaľa	33	13	6	14	35	43	−8	45	
8	Ružomberok B	33	12	7	14	49	52	−3	43	
9	Zemplín Michalovce	33	11	8	14	42	48	−6	41	
10	Humenné	33	11	6	16	35	51	−16	39	
11	Košice B (R)	33	6	8	19	32	57	−25	26	Relegation to 2. liga
12	DAC Dunajská Streda B (R)	33	2	4	27	18	92	−74	10	Relegation to 2. liga

Source: RSSSF.org
Rules for classification: 1) points; 2) goal difference; 3) number of goals scored.
(C) Champions; (P) Promoted; (R) Relegated

== Top goalscorers ==
Rank	Player	Club	Goals
1	(Argentina) David Depetris	AS Trenčín	21
2	(Slovakia) Roland Števko	Ružomberok B	20
3	(Slovakia) Tomáš Mrázek	Púchov	15
4	(Slovakia) Jozef Pisár	R. Sobota	12
4	(Slovakia) Peter Tomko	L. Mikuláš	12
6	(Slovakia) Jozef Gašpar	Michalovce	11

== See also ==
- 2008–09 Slovak Superliga
