= 2007–08 Slovak Superliga =

Corgoň Liga
- Season: 2007–08
- Dates: 14 July 2007 – 31 May 2008
- Champions: Artmedia Bratislava
- Relegated: AS Trenčín
- Champions League: Artmedia Bratislava
- UEFA Cup: Žilina; Spartak Trnava
- Intertoto Cup: Nitra
- Matches: 198
- Goals: 534 (2.7 per match)
- Top goalscorer: Ján Novák (17 goals)
- Average attendance: ▲3,106

The 2007–08 Slovak Superliga (known as the Slovak Corgoň Liga for sponsorship reasons) was the 15th season of first-tier football league in Slovakia, since its establishment in 1993. It began on 14 July 2007 and ended on 31 May 2008. MŠK Žilina were the defending champions.

== Teams ==
A total of 12 teams was contested in the league, including 12 sides from the 2006–07 season and one promoted from the 1. Liga via play-off.

Relegation for FK Inter Bratislava to the 2007–08 1. Liga was confirmed on 30 May 2007. The one relegated team were replaced by FC ViOn Zlaté Moravce.

=== Stadiums and locations ===
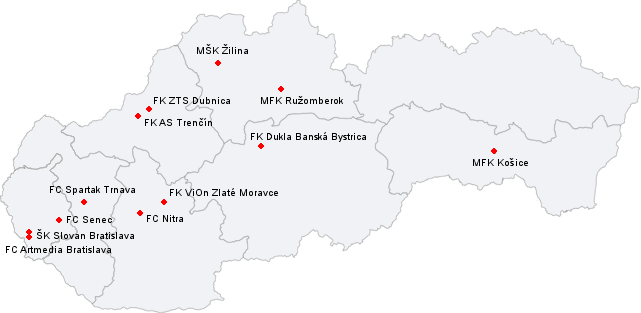
Location of teams in 2007–08 Corgoň Liga

Team	Home city	Stadium	Capacity
Artmedia Bratislava	Bratislava	Štadión Petržalka	7,500
FK AS Trenčín	Trenčín	Štadión na Sihoti	4,500
Dukla Banská Bystrica	Banská Bystrica	SNP Stadium	10,000
FC ViOn Zlaté Moravce	Zlaté Moravce	Štadión FC ViOn	3,787
FC Nitra	Nitra	Štadión pod Zoborom	11,384
MFK Košice	Košice	Lokomotíva Stadium	9,000
MFK Ružomberok	Ružomberok	Štadión MFK Ružomberok	4,817
MŠK Žilina	Žilina	Štadión pod Dubňom	11,181
FC Senec	Senec	NTC Senec	3,264
Slovan Bratislava	Bratislava	Tehelné pole	30,085
Spartak Trnava	Trnava	Štadión Antona Malatinského	18,448
ZTS Dubnica nad Váhom	Dubnica	Štadión Zimný	5,450

== League table ==
Pos	Team	Pld	W	D	L	GF	GA	GD	Pts	Qualification or relegation
1	Artmedia Bratislava (C)	33	27	3	3	77	30	+47	84	Qualification for Champions League second qualifying round
2	Žilina	33	22	7	4	75	30	+45	73	Qualification for UEFA Cup first qualifying round
3	Nitra	33	17	6	10	40	26	+14	57	Qualification for Intertoto Cup first round
4	Spartak Trnava	33	15	7	11	52	40	+12	52	Qualification for UEFA Cup first qualifying round (Note: Spartak Trnava qualify for 2008–09 UEFA Cup as runner-up of 2007–08 Slovak Cup.)
5	Slovan Bratislava	33	15	6	12	46	37	+9	51	
6	Košice	33	13	6	14	45	44	+1	45	
7	Ružomberok	33	10	14	9	46	43	+3	44	
8	Dukla Banská Bystrica	33	10	9	14	41	37	+4	39	
9	ZTS Dubnica	33	7	12	14	34	53	−19	33	
10	FC Senec	33	6	10	17	30	51	−21	28	
11	ViOn Zlaté Moravce	33	6	7	20	22	66	−44	25	
12	Trenčín (R)	33	3	7	23	26	77	−51	16	Relegation to 1. Liga

Source: RSSSF.org
Rules for classification: 1) points; 2) goal difference; 3) number of goals scored.
(C) Champions; (R) Relegated

== Results ==
=== First and second round ===
Home \ Away	ART	BB	DUB	KOŠ	NIT	RUŽ	SEN	SLO	TRE	TRN	ZLM	ŽIL
Artmedia Bratislava		6–3	1–0	0–0	1–0	3–0	3–1	2–1	3–2	3–1	5–0	2–3
Dukla Banská Bystrica	2–2		0–1	1–2	1–0	1–1	2–0	0–0	1–1	0–0	1–0	1–3
ZTS Dubnica	1–3	1–0		0–1	0–2	0–0	1–1	2–1	2–1	0–1	4–1	0–2
Košice	0–1	1–3	0–0		2–1	1–0	0–0	3–0	4–0	3–2	3–0	2–0
Nitra	1–0	1–0	1–1	1–0		3–0	2–0	1–0	2–0	3–2	2–0	0–1
Ružomberok	0–3	2–2	2–2	1–0	2–2		1–1	0–2	4–1	2–0	3–0	1–2
Senec	2–3	1–1	2–1	1–1	0–1	2–3		1–0	3–0	1–3	1–1	0–0
Slovan Bratislava	1–2	1–0	4–1	2–1	2–1	0–1	3–0		2–1	2–3	2–2	2–3
Trenčín	1–4	0–3	2–2	1–2	1–2	0–3	2–1	1–2		0–2	4–0	2–2
Spartak Trnava	0–2	1–0	1–1	5–1	2–1	2–2	1–0	1–1	6–0		2–0	4–1
ViOn Zlaté Moravce	1–3	3–2	0–0	2–1	0–0	1–2	1–0	1–0	2–0	0–0		1–2
Žilina	1–0	1–0	4–1	4–0	0–0	3–1	2–0	3–0	7–1	2–1	4–1	

Source: RSSSF.org
Legend: Blue = home team win; Yellow = draw; Red = away team win.

=== Third round ===
Home \ Away	ART	BB	DUB	KOŠ	NIT	RUŽ	SEN	SLO	TRE	TRN	ZLM	ŽIL
Artmedia Bratislava		2–1		1–0				2–1	1–0	2–1	4–0	
Dukla Banská Bystrica			3–2	3–0			2–0	0–1				1–1
ZTS Dubnica	0–2				2–1	1–1	0–0				2–0	
Košice			6–2		1–2		4–0	1–1	2–1			2–2
Nitra	0–3	1–0				1–0			3–0	0–0	2–0	
Ružomberok	2–2	0–0		3–0					0–0	4–0	2–2	
Senec	4–5				1–0	2–2				4–1	1–0	
Slovan Bratislava			3–2		3–2	0–0	4–0		3–0			0–0
Trenčín		1–3	1–1				0–0			2–1	0–0	
Spartak Trnava		1–0	1–1	2–0				0–1				3–1
ViOn Zlaté Moravce		0–4		2–1				0–1		0–2		1–6
Žilina	0–1		5–0		1–1	4–1	1–0		4–0			

Source: RSSSF.org
Legend: Blue = home team win; Yellow = draw; Red = away team win.

== Season statistics ==
=== Top scorers ===
Rank	Player	Club	Goals
1	(Slovakia) Ján Novák	Košice	17
2	(Slovakia) Juraj Halenár	Artmedia Bratislava	16
3	(Slovakia) Peter Štyvar	Žilina	15
4	(Slovakia) Mário Breška	Žilina	14
5	(Senegal) Mouhamadou Seye	ZTS Dubnica	13
6	(Slovakia) Ján Kozák	Artmedia Bratislava	11
7	(Bosnia and Herzegovina) Admir Vladavić	Žilina	10
7	(Slovakia) Jaroslav Kolbas	Košice	10
7	(Slovakia) Ivan Lietava	Žilina	10
7	(Slovakia) Marek Bakoš	Ružomberok	10
11	(Slovakia) Ľubomír Bernáth	Spartak Trnava	9

== See also ==
- 2007–08 Slovak Cup
- 2007–08 Slovak First League
