= Róbert Tomko =

Slovak footballer

Personal information
- Full name: Róbert Tomko
- Date of birth: 16 December 1979 (age 46)
- Place of birth: Prešov, Czechoslovakia
- Height: 1.84 m (6 ft 1/2 in)
- Position: Striker

Youth career
- Tatran Prešov

Senior career*
Years	Team	Apps	(Gls)
1998–2005	Ličartovce		
1999–2000	→ Senec (loan)		
2004	→ Tatran Prešov (loan)		
2005	1. HFC Humenné		
2006	Rimavská Sobota		
2007	Ružomberok	14	(0)
2008–2009	Podbrezová		(13)
2009–2010	FC ViOn	58	(11)
2011	→ Bardejov (loan)	15	(4)
2011–2012	Bardejov		
2012–2016	TJ ISKRA Borčice		
- * Club domestic league appearances and goals

Róbert Tomko (born 16 December 1979 in Prešov) is a Slovak former footballer who played as a striker.
