= Andrej Burza =

Slovak football midfielder

Personal information
- Full name: Andrej Burza
- Date of birth: 2 November 1979 (age 47)
- Place of birth: Czechoslovakia
- Height: 1.80 m (5 ft 11 in)
- Position: Midfielder

Team information
- Current team: Inter Bratislava

Youth career
- Inter Bratislava

Senior career*
Years	Team	Apps	(Gls)
2002–2009	Inter Bratislava	96	(0)
2001–2002	→ŠKP Devín (loan)		
2009–2010	MFK Petržalka	14	(0)
2011–	Inter Bratislava		
- * Club domestic league appearances and goals as of 1 March 2012

Andrej Burza (born 2 November 1979) is a Slovak football midfielder who currently plays for FK Inter Bratislava.
