= Slovak First Football League =

Highest men's association football league in Slovakia

Niké liga
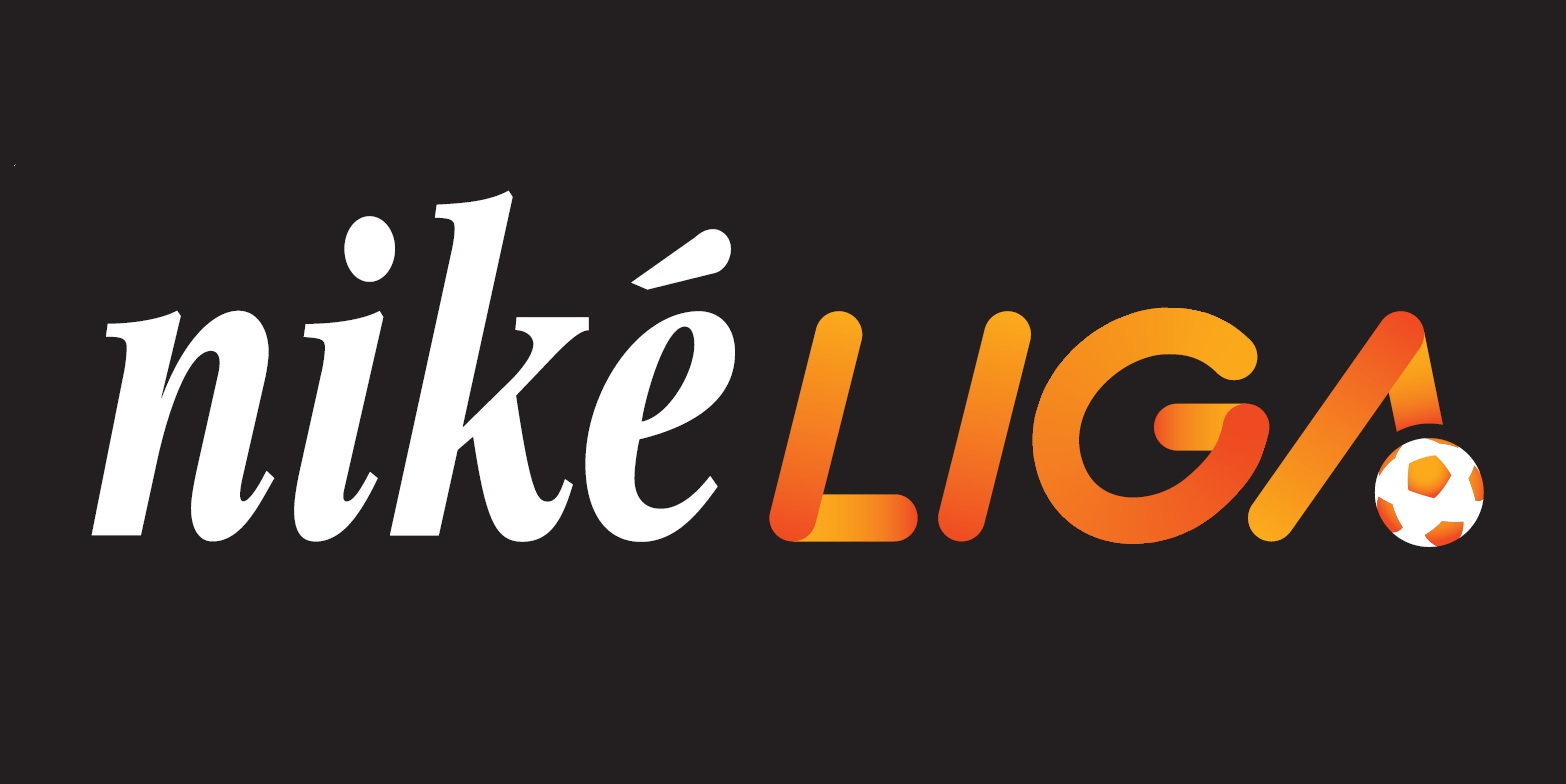
- Organising body: Slovak Football Association
- Founded: 1993
- Country: Slovakia
- Confederation: UEFA
- Number of clubs: 12
- Level on pyramid: 1
- Relegation to: 2. liga
- Domestic cup: Slovak Cup
- International cup(s): UEFA Champions League; UEFA Europa League; UEFA Conference League
- Current champions: Slovan Bratislava (16th title) (2025–26)
- Most championships: Slovan Bratislava (16 titles)
- Broadcaster(s): Domestic; Markíza; STVR (highlights); International; Eleven Sports; OneFootball
- Website: nikeliga.sk
- Current: 2026–27 Slovak First Football League

The Slovak First Football League (Slovak: 1. slovenská futbalová liga), officially known as Niké liga for sponsorship reasons, is a professional association football league in Slovakia and the highest level of the Slovak football league system. It was formed in 1993 following the dissolution of Czechoslovakia. The record for most titles is sixteen, held by Slovan Bratislava, who are the current title holders.

== History ==
The current independent top football division in Slovakia was formed in 1993 as a result of the dissolution of Czechoslovakia. The predecessors of the current top football division in Slovakia were Zväzové Majstrovstvá Slovenska (1925–1933) and Slovenská liga (1938–1944).

Slovakia was part of Czechoslovakia (1918–1939 and 1945–1993) and the best Slovak clubs played in the joint Czechoslovak First League. Three Slovak clubs managed to win it.

=== Zväzové Majstrovstvá Slovenska (1925–1933) ===
Season	Champions (number of titles)	Runners-up	Third place
1925–26	1. ČsŠK Bratislava		
1926–27	1. ČsŠK Bratislava		
1927–28	SK Žilina		
1928–29	SK Žilina		
1929–30	1. ČsŠK Bratislava		
1930–31	Ligeti SC		
1931–32	1. ČsŠK Bratislava		
1932–33	SC Rusj Uzhorod		

=== Slovenská liga (1938–1944) ===
Season	Champions (number of titles)	Runners-up	Third place
1938–39	AC Sparta Považská Bystrica	ŠK Bratislava	MŠK Žilina
1939–40	ŠK Bratislava	AC Sparta Považská Bystrica	MŠK Žilina
1940–41	ŠK Bratislava	FC Vrútky	AC Sparta Považská Bystrica
1941–42	ŠK Bratislava	FC Vrútky	MŠK Žilina
1942–43	OAP Bratislava	ŠK Bratislava	AC Sparta Považská Bystrica
1943–44	ŠK Bratislava	OAP Bratislava	TSS Trnava
1944–45	abandoned in September 1944		

=== Slovak winners of the Czechoslovak 1. League (1945–1993) ===
Club	Winners	Winning seasons
Slovan Bratislava	8	1949, 1950, 1951, 1955, 1969–70, 1973–74, 1974–75, 1991–92
Spartak Trnava	5	1967–68, 1968–69, 1970–71, 1971–72, 1972–73
Inter Bratislava	1	1958–59

== Competition format ==
Over the years, the number of teams competing in the top division has varied. The current number of 12 teams has been in effect since the 2006–07 season. However, there were also changes in the playing format afterwards. In the current format, which has been in effect since the 2017–18 season, teams play home-and-away against every other team in the regular stage, for a total of 22 matches each. The table is then divided into two halves of 6 teams each – the top 6 play in the championship group and the bottom 6 play in the relegation group. Within these groups, teams again play home-and-away against each other, for a total of 10 matches each.

Period	Number of teams
1993–1996	12
1996–2000	16
2000–2006	10
2006–present	12

== Sponsorship ==
Period	Sponsor	Name
1993–1997	No sponsor	1. liga
1997–2002	Reemtsma	Mars superliga
2002–2003	No sponsor	1. liga
2003–2014	Heineken	Corgoň liga
2014–2023	Fortuna	Fortuna liga
2023–present	Niké	Niké liga

== Clubs ==
=== Champions ===
Season	Champions	Runners-up	Third place	Top scorer	Goals	Team
1993–94	Slovan Bratislava (1)	Inter Bratislava	DAC Dunajská Streda	(Slovakia) Pavol Diňa	19	DAC Dunajská Streda
1994–95	Slovan Bratislava (2)	1. FC Košice	Inter Bratislava	(Slovakia) Robert Semenik	18	Dukla Banská Bystrica
1995–96	Slovan Bratislava (3)	1. FC Košice	Spartak Trnava	(Slovakia) Robert Semenik	29	1. FC Košice
1996–97	1. FC Košice (1)	Spartak Trnava	Slovan Bratislava	(Slovakia) Jozef Kožlej	22	1. FC Košice
1997–98	1. FC Košice (2)	Spartak Trnava	Inter Bratislava	(Slovakia) Ľubomír Luhový	17	Spartak Trnava
1998–99	Slovan Bratislava (4)	Inter Bratislava	Spartak Trnava	(Slovakia) Martin Fabuš	19	Trenčín
1999–2000	Inter Bratislava (1)	1. FC Košice	Slovan Bratislava	(Slovakia) Szilárd Németh	16	Inter Bratislava
2000–01	Inter Bratislava (2)	Slovan Bratislava	Ružomberok	(Slovakia) Szilárd Németh	23	Inter Bratislava
2001–02	Žilina (1)	Púchov	Inter Bratislava	(Slovakia) Marek Mintál	21	Žilina
2002–03	Žilina (2)	Petržalka	Slovan Bratislava	(Slovakia) Martin Fabuš (Slovakia) Marek Mintál	20	Trenčín, Žilina; Žilina
2003–04	Žilina (3)	Dukla Banská Bystrica	Ružomberok	(Slovakia) Roland Števko	17	Ružomberok
2004–05	Petržalka (1)	Žilina	Dukla Banská Bystrica	(Slovakia) Filip Šebo	22	Petržalka
2005–06	Ružomberok (1)	Petržalka	Spartak Trnava	(Slovakia) Róbert Rák (Slovakia) Erik Jendrišek	21	Nitra; Ružomberok
2006–07	Žilina (4)	Petržalka	Slovan Bratislava	(Slovakia) Tomáš Oravec	16	Petržalka
2007–08	Petržalka (2)	Žilina	Nitra	(Slovakia) Ján Novák	17	Košice
2008–09	Slovan Bratislava (5)	Žilina	Spartak Trnava	(Slovakia) Pavol Masaryk	15	Slovan Bratislava
2009–10	Žilina (5)	Slovan Bratislava	Dukla Banská Bystrica	(Slovakia) Róbert Rák	18	Nitra
2010–11	Slovan Bratislava (6)	Senica	Žilina	(Slovakia) Filip Šebo	22	Slovan Bratislava
2011–12	Žilina (6)	Spartak Trnava	Slovan Bratislava	(Slovakia) Pavol Masaryk	18	Ružomberok
2012–13	Slovan Bratislava (7)	Senica	Trenčín	(Slovakia) David Depetris	16	Trenčín
2013–14	Slovan Bratislava (8)	Trenčín	Spartak Trnava	(Slovakia) Tomáš Malec	14	Trenčín
2014–15	Trenčín (1)	Žilina	Slovan Bratislava	(Croatia) Matej Jelić (Czech Republic) Jan Kalabiška	19	Žilina; Senica
2015–16	Trenčín (2)	Slovan Bratislava	Spartak Myjava	(Curaçao) Gino van Kessel	17	Trenčín
2016–17	Žilina (7)	Slovan Bratislava	Ružomberok	(Slovakia) Filip Hlohovský (Guinea) Seydouba Soumah	20	Žilina; Slovan Bratislava
2017–18	Spartak Trnava (1)	Slovan Bratislava	DAC Dunajská Streda	(Slovakia) Samuel Mráz	21	Žilina
2018–19	Slovan Bratislava (9)	DAC Dunajská Streda	Ružomberok	(Slovenia) Andraž Šporar	29	Slovan Bratislava
2019–20	Slovan Bratislava (10)	Žilina	DAC Dunajská Streda	(Slovenia) Andraž Šporar	12	Slovan Bratislava
2020–21	Slovan Bratislava (11)	DAC Dunajská Streda	Spartak Trnava	(Poland) Dawid Kurminowski	19	Žilina
2021–22	Slovan Bratislava (12)	Ružomberok	Spartak Trnava	(Slovakia) Jakub Kadák	13	Trenčín
2022–23	Slovan Bratislava (13)	DAC Dunajská Streda	Spartak Trnava	(Montenegro) Nikola Krstović	18	DAC Dunajská Streda
2023–24	Slovan Bratislava (14)	DAC Dunajská Streda	Spartak Trnava	(Slovakia) Róbert Polievka (Armenia) Tigran Barseghyan	13	Banská Bystrica; Slovan Bratislava
2024–25	Slovan Bratislava (15)	Žilina	Spartak Trnava	(Armenia) Tigran Barseghyan (Slovakia) David Strelec	20	Slovan Bratislava
2025–26	Slovan Bratislava (16)	DAC Dunajská Streda	Spartak Trnava	(Slovakia) Michal Faško	14	Žilina
2026–27						

Source for list of championship winners:

==== Performance by club ====
Clubs in bold currently play in the top division.

Club	Winners	Runners-up	Championship seasons	Runners-up seasons
**Slovan Bratislava**	16	5	1993–94, 1994–95, 1995–96, 1998–99, 2008–09, 2010–11, 2012–13, 2013–14, 2018–19, 2019–20, 2020–21, 2021–22, 2022–23, 2023–24, 2024–25, 2025–26	2000–01, 2009–10, 2015–16, 2016–17, 2017–18
**Žilina**	7	6	2001–02, 2002–03, 2003–04, 2006–07, 2009–10, 2011–12, 2016–17	2004–05, 2007–08, 2008–09, 2014–15, 2019–20, 2024–25
VSS Košice	2	3	1996–97, 1997–98	1994–95, 1995–96, 1999–2000
Artmedia Bratislava	2	3	2004–05, 2007–08	2002–03, 2005–06, 2006–07
Inter Bratislava	2	2	1999–2000, 2000–01	1993–94, 1998–99
**Trenčín**	2	1	2014–15, 2015–16	2013–14
**Spartak Trnava**	1	3	2017–18	1996–97, 1997–98, 2011–12
**Ružomberok**	1	1	2005–06	2021–22
**DAC Dunajská Streda**	–	5	–	2018–19, 2020–21, 2022–23, 2023–24, 2025–26
Senica	–	2	–	2010–11, 2012–13
Púchov	–	1	–	2001–02
**Dukla Banská Bystrica**	–	1	–	2003–04

==== Titles by city ====
City	Titles	Winning clubs
Bratislava	20	Slovan Bratislava (16), Inter Bratislava (2), Artmedia Bratislava (2)
Žilina	7	Žilina (7)
Košice	2	VSS Košice (2)
Trenčín	2	Trenčín (2)
Ružomberok	1	Ružomberok (1)
Trnava	1	Spartak Trnava (1)

=== 2025–26 season ===
Twelve clubs competed in the 2025–26 season.

Location of clubs in Slovakia for the 2025–26 season

Team	Location	Stadium	Capacity
DAC Dunajská Streda	Dunajská Streda	MOL Aréna	12,700
Tatran Prešov	Prešov	Futbal Tatran Arena	6,500
Košice	Košice	Košická futbalová aréna	12,555
Podbrezová	Podbrezová	ZELPO Aréna	4,000
Ružomberok	Ružomberok	Štadión pod Čebraťom	4,876
Skalica	Skalica	Štadión MFK Skalica	2,600
Slovan Bratislava	Bratislava	Tehelné pole	22,500
Spartak Trnava	Trnava	Štadión Antona Malatinského	18,200
Trenčín	Trenčín	Štadión Sihoť	10,000
Zemplín Michalovce	Michalovce	Mestský futbalový štadión	4,440
Komárno	Komárno	ViOn Aréna	4,008
Žilina	Žilina	Štadión pod Dubňom	10,897

== All-time league table ==
The all-time league table is an overall record of all match results, points, and goals of every team that has played in Slovak I. liga since its inception in 1993. The table as of the end of 2025–26 season. Teams in bold are part of the 2026–27 Niké liga. There is no club that played all seasons in top-flight. The best clubs in that respect, Žilina and Spartak Trnava, missed 1 season, Slovan Bratislava missed 2 seasons.

Pos	Team	S	P	W	D	L	F	A	GD	Pts
1	**Slovan Bratislava**	31	1006	584	222	200	1847	991	856	**1974**
2	**MŠK Žilina**	32	1070	514	239	317	1827	1206	621	**1781**
3	**Spartak Trnava**	32	1062	488	239	331	1491	1156	335	**1651**
4	**MFK Ružomberok**	29	976	369	276	331	1256	1204	52	**1383**
5	**AS Trenčín**	26	869	329	190	340	1247	1225	22	**1205**
6	**DAC Dunajská Streda**	23	730	272	186	272	926	989	(-63)	**938** *
7	**Dukla Banská Bystrica**	22	712	229	190	293	860	943	(-83)	**877**
8	VSS Košice	19	616	241	148	227	835	799	36	**863**
9	FC Petržalka	14	463	204	114	145	676	561	115	**726**
10	Inter Bratislava	14	454	203	102	149	667	519	148	**693**
11	FC Nitra	18	572	177	128	299	607	875	(-268)	**644**
12	Tatran Prešov	17	547	154	155	238	558	777	(-219)	**607**
13	FK Senica	14	448	147	113	186	510	619	(-138)	**556**
14	ViOn Zlaté Moravce	17	545	139	135	273	553	859	(-306)	**552**
15	MFK Dubnica	13	424	119	117	188	436	604	(-168)	**473**
16	**Zemplín Michalovce**	12	378	109	95	172	428	605	(-177)	**422**
17	**Železiarne Podbrezová**	9	288	92	65	121	354	420	(-66)	**304**
18	MŠK Púchov	6	216	70	53	93	235	294	(-59)	**263**
19	Chemlon Humenné	7	216	71	43	102	238	323	(-85)	**246**
20	Baník Prievidza	7	216	59	44	113	239	369	(-130)	**212**
21	Spartak Myjava	5	132	55	27	50	167	177	(-10)	**192**
22	ŠKF Sereď	5	155	49	39	67	176	237	(-61)	**186**
23	**MFK Skalica**	5	161	46	39	76	173	228	(-55)	**177**
24	Lokomotíva Košice	5	156	48	37	71	180	241	(-61)	**174**
25	Partizán Bardejov	5	154	45	24	85	159	232	(−73)	**159**
26	FC Rimavská Sobota	4	126	35	29	62	129	193	(−64)	**134**
27	FK Pohronie	4	123	26	42	55	128	179	(-51)	**120**
28	**FC Košice**	3	96	31	21	44	123	149	(-26)	**114**
29	FC Senec	3	91	18	28	45	85	152	(−67)	**82**
30	**KFC Komárno**	2	64	19	14	31	70	94	(-24)	**71**
31	Tatran Liptovský Mikuláš	2	64	14	16	34	66	116	(-50)	**58**

S = Number of seasons; P = Matches played; W = Matches won; D = Matches drawn; L = Matches lost; F = Goals for; A = Goals against; GD = Goal difference; Pts = Points
^{a}Spartak Myjava withdrew from the league on 21 December 2016, and their results from season 2016-17 were annulled.

- DAC had 6 points deducted in 2013/14 season.

League or status:

2026–27 Slovak First Football League
2026–27 2. Liga (Slovakia)
2026–27 3. Liga (Slovakia)
4. Liga (Slovakia)
Below 4th tier
Defunct

== European competitions ==
=== UEFA coefficients ===
The following data indicates Slovak coefficient rankings between European football leagues.

Country ranking

UEFA League Ranking as of the end 2023/24 season for the period of 2019-2024:

- 20. (22) (Serbia) Serbian SuperLiga (23.675)
- 21. (20) (Ukraine) Ukrainian Premier League (22.800)
- 22. (28) (Slovakia) Slovak I. Liga (21.250)
- 23. (21) (Hungary) Nemzeti Bajnokság I (21.000)
- 24. (23) (Sweden) Allsvenskan (20.000)

Club ranking

UEFA 5-year Club Ranking as of the August 30 2024 season:

- 54. ▲ Slovan Bratislava (33.500)
- 158. ▲ Spartak Trnava (8.500)
- 163. ▲DAC Dunajská Streda (8.000)
- 265. ▲ Žilina (5.000)
- 266. ▲ Ružomberok (5.000)

== Players ==
The clubs sell their players to financially stronger clubs from western Europe. Examples of players that have succeeded in notable leagues are Marek Hamšík, who was captain of Italian club SSC Napoli, Peter Pekarík who captained Bundesliga side Hertha BSC or Martin Škrtel, a well-known former Liverpool centre-back who is now the Sporting director of FC Spartak Trnava. Moreover, over the last few years more and more youngsters have been given chances to perform regularly in the league and as the result, many transfers were to be seen. For example Leon Bailey, Milan Škriniar, Stanislav Lobotka or Samuel Kalu could have been seen playing football at Slovak stadiums recently.

=== Top scorers ===
As of the end of the 2017–18 season.

Goals	Name	Clubs/goals for the club
125	Juraj Halenár	Inter Bratislava 35, Petržalka 33, Slovan Bratislava 57
120	Róbert Semeník	Dukla Banská Bystrica 72, 1. FC Košice 43, Nitra 5
86	Marek Ujlaky	Spartak Trnava 79, Slovan Bratislava 2, Senec 3, Zlaté Moravce 2
86	Pavol Masaryk	Spartak Trnava 10, Slovan Bratislava 45, Ružomberok 28, Senica 2, Skalica 1
85	Szilárd Németh	Slovan Bratislava 25, 1. FC Košice 21, Inter Bratislava 39
83	Vladimír Kožuch	Spartak Trnava 61, Tatran Prešov 22
81	Martin Fabuš	ODu/AS Trenčín 59, Žilina 17, Dukla Banská Bystrica 5
78	Tomáš Oravec	1. FC Košice 4, Ružomberok 19, Petržalka 28, Žilina 24, Spartak Trnava 3
78	Róbert Rák	Nitra 61, Ružomberok 17
76	Marek Mintál	Žilina 76

== Transfers ==
=== Record departures ===
Rank	Player	From	To	Fee	Year
1	(Slovakia) David Strelec	Slovan Bratislava	(England) Middlesbrough	€10 million	2025
2.	(Nigeria) Suleman Sani	Trenčín	(Germany) RB Leipzig	€7.0 million	2026
3	(Slovakia) Szilárd Németh	Inter Bratislava	(England) Middlesbrough	€6.75 million	2001
4	(Slovenia) Andraž Šporar	Slovan Bratislava	(Portugal) Sporting CP	€6 million (Note: Fee may eventually rise above €7 million.)	2020
5	(Slovakia) László Bénes	Žilina	(Germany) Mönchengladbach	€5.5 million	2016
6	(Hungary) Damir Redzic	DAC Dunajská Streda	(Austria) RB Salzburg	€5 million	2026
7	(Czech Republic) Pavel Nedvěd	1.FC Košice	(Italy) S.S. Lazio	€4.6 million	1996
7	(Slovakia) Róbert Boženík	Žilina	(Netherlands) Feyenoord	€4.6 million	2020
8	(Slovakia) Dávid Hancko	Žilina	(Italy) Fiorentina	€4.5 million	2018
8	(Montenegro) Nikola Krstović	DAC Dunajská Streda	(Italy) US Lecce	€4.5 million (Note: Dunajská Streda received an additional payment after Krstović's subsequent transfer to Atalanta BC, increasing the total compenastion to €8.1 million.)	2023
9	(Slovakia) Peter Dubovský	Slovan Bratislava	(Spain) Real Madrid	€4.3 million (110 mil. SKK)	1993
10	(Brazil) Wesley	Trenčín	(Belgium) Club Brugge	€4.2 million	2016

*-unofficial fee

=== Record arrivals ===
Rank	Player	From	To	Fee	Year
1	(Nigeria) Rabiu Ibrahim	(Belgium) Gent	Slovan Bratislava	€1.0 million	2017
1	(Croatia) Marko Tolić	(Croatia) Dinamo Zagreb	Slovan Bratislava	€1.0 million	2024
1	(The Gambia) Alasana Yirajang	(Slovakia) Podbrezová	Slovan Bratislava	€1.0 million	2025
1	(Serbia) Svetozar Marković	(Czech Republic) Viktoria Plzeň	Slovan Bratislava	€1.0 million	2026
1	(The Gambia) Suleiman Camara	(Spain) Racing Santander	Slovan Bratislava	€1.0 million	2026
2	(Ukraine) Mykola Kukharevych	(England) Swansea	Slovan Bratislava	€0.8 million	2025
3	(Hungary) Dávid Holman	(Hungary) Debrecen	Slovan Bratislava	€0.7 million	2017
3	(Trinidad and Tobago) Lester Peltier	(Slovakia) Trenčín	Slovan Bratislava	€0.7 million	2012
3	(Slovakia) Marek Špilár	(Slovakia) Tatran Prešov	1. FC Košice	€0.7 million (20mil SKK)*	1997
3	(Hungary) András Telek	(Hungary) Ferencváros	1. FC Košice	€0.7 million (20mil SKK)*	1997
3	(Slovakia) David Strelec	(Italy) Spezia Calcio	Slovan Bratislava	€0.7 million	2024
3	(Panama) Cristian Martínez	(Israel) Kiryat Shmona	Slovan Bratislava	€0.7 million	2026
4	(Slovenia) Kenan Bajrić	(Slovenia) Olimpija Ljubljana	Slovan Bratislava	€0.6 million	2018
4	(Slovenia) Andraž Šporar	(Switzerland) Basel	Slovan Bratislava	€0.6 million	2018
4	(Slovakia) Samuel Štefánik	(Netherlands) NEC Nijmegen	Slovan Bratislava	€0.6 million	2014
4	(Ivory Coast) Julien Bationo	(Armenia) FC Alashkert	Dunajská Streda	€0.6 million	2025
