= Ľuboš Perniš =

Slovak footballer

Personal information
- Full name: Ľuboš Perniš
- Date of birth: 21 September 1976 (age 50)
- Place of birth: Bojnice, Czechoslovakia
- Height: 1.91 m (6 ft 3 in)
- Position: Centre forward

Senior career*
Years	Team	Apps	(Gls)
1993–1994	Prievidza		
1994–1996	Banská Bystrica		
1996–1999	Prievidza		
1999–2000	Inter Bratislava		
2000–2003	Púchov		
2004	Nitra		
2004–2005	Sliema Wanderers		
2005–2006	Jihlava		
2006	Prešov		
2007	Al-Arabi Club		
2007–2008	Prievidza		
- * Club domestic league appearances and goals as of 7 April 2012

Ľuboš Perniš (born 21 September 1976) is a Slovak football striker.
