= 1944–45 Slovenská liga =

Slovenská liga
- Season: 1944–45
- Champions: not completed

The 1944–45 Slovenská liga (English: Slovak league) was the seventh and last season of the Slovenská liga, the first tier of league football in the Slovak Republic, formerly part of Czechoslovakia until the German occupation of the country in March 1939.

In the Slovak Republic, an independent Slovak league had been established in 1939 and played out its own championship which was abandoned after just two rounds in 1944–45. In the German-annexed Protectorate of Bohemia and Moravia a separate league, the Národní liga (English:National league), was played was not played at all in the 1944–45 season. A national Czechoslovak championship was not played between 1939 and 1945.

== Table ==
For the 1944–45 season Svit Batizovce and Kabel Bratislava had been newly promoted to the league.

Pos	Team	Pld	W	D	L	GF	GA	GR	Pts
1	OAP Bratislava	2	2	0	0	9	1	9.000	4
2	TTS Trenčín	2	2	0	0	7	3	2.333	4
3	ŠK Bratislava	2	1	1	0	8	2	4.000	3
4	Svit Batizovce	2	1	1	0	4	3	1.333	3
5	MŠK Žilina	2	1	0	1	6	3	2.000	2
6	ZTK Zvolen	2	1	0	1	10	5	2.000	2
7	Sparta Považská Bystrica	2	1	0	1	7	6	1.167	2
8	HG Šimonovany	2	1	0	1	7	8	0.875	2
9	TSS Trnava	2	1	0	1	4	8	0.500	2
10	MFK Ružomberok	2	0	0	2	3	7	0.429	0
11	Kabel Bratislava	2	0	0	2	3	12	0.250	0
12	Slávia Prešov	2	0	0	2	1	11	0.091	0

Source: rsssf.com
