= FC Steel Trans Ličartovce =

- Full name: Football Club Steel Trans Ličartovce
- Founded: 1938
- Dissolved: 2005 (became MFK Košice)
- Ground: Ličartovce Stadium, Ličartovce
- Capacity: 2,400
- League: Last league was Second Division
- Final season 2004/05: 2nd
Home colours	Away colours

FC Steel Trans Ličartovce was a former Slovak football club which was playing in the east-Slovak village of Ličartovce.

The club was re-established in 2008, under the name ŠK FC Ličartovce.

== History ==
=== Early years ===
After the successful businessman Blažej Podolák joined the local football club in 1992, a period of significant growth began, from the lowest district competition to the second Slovak league, advancing from the III. district class to the II. league in 5 years. Around 2002, the club was regularly fighting for promotion to the highest Slovak competition. In 2004, Ličartovce fought its way into the final of the Slovak Cup. Drawing the first leg 1–1 against Spartak Trnava, Ličartovce would lose the second leg 1–0.

=== Merge with FC Košice ===
On August 30, 2004, the club merged with the defunct club 1. FC Košice. In the summer of 2005, the club’s identity was changed to MFK Košice and was moved to Košice.

However, football in Ličartovce did not disappear, and on August 11, 2005, a new club, FC Ličartovce, was founded, which started in 2008 in the lowest competition ObFZ Prešov. In 2022, the club played against 1. FC Tatran Prešov in the Slovak Cup.

== Honours ==
- Slovak Cup
  - Runners-up (1): 2004
- Slovak Second Division
  - Runners-Up (4): 2001–02, 2002–03, 2003–04, 2004–05
