= Jozef Pisár =

Slovak footballer

Personal information
- Full name: Jozef Pisár
- Date of birth: 20 July 1971 (age 55)
- Place of birth: Czechoslovakia
- Height: 1.80 m (5 ft 11 in)
- Position: Striker

Youth career
- Rimavská Sobota

Senior career*
Years	Team	Apps	(Gls)
1989–1990	Dunajská Streda		
1990–1991	Dukla Banská Bystrica		
1991–1994	Dunajská Streda		
?–1998	Partizán Bardejov		
1998–1999	Rimavská Sobota		
1999	Košice		
1999–2011	Rimavská Sobota		

International career
1997–1998	Slovakia	4	(1)
- * Club domestic league appearances and goals as of 13 January 2012

Jozef Pisár (born 20 July 1971) is a former Slovak football striker who last played for the Rimavská Sobota.
