= FK Slovan Levice =

Slovak football club

- Full name: FK Slovan Levice
- Founded: 1911
- Ground: Futbalový štadión Levice, Levice
- Capacity: 7,000 (700 seated)
- Chairman: Ján Šula
- Manager: Karol Praženica
- League: 3. liga
- 2020–21: promoted
- Website: http://www.fkslovanlevice.sk/
Home colours

FK Slovan Levice is a Slovak football team, based in the town of Levice. The club was founded in 1911.
