= Futbal Tatran Arena =

Football stadium in Prešov, Slovakia

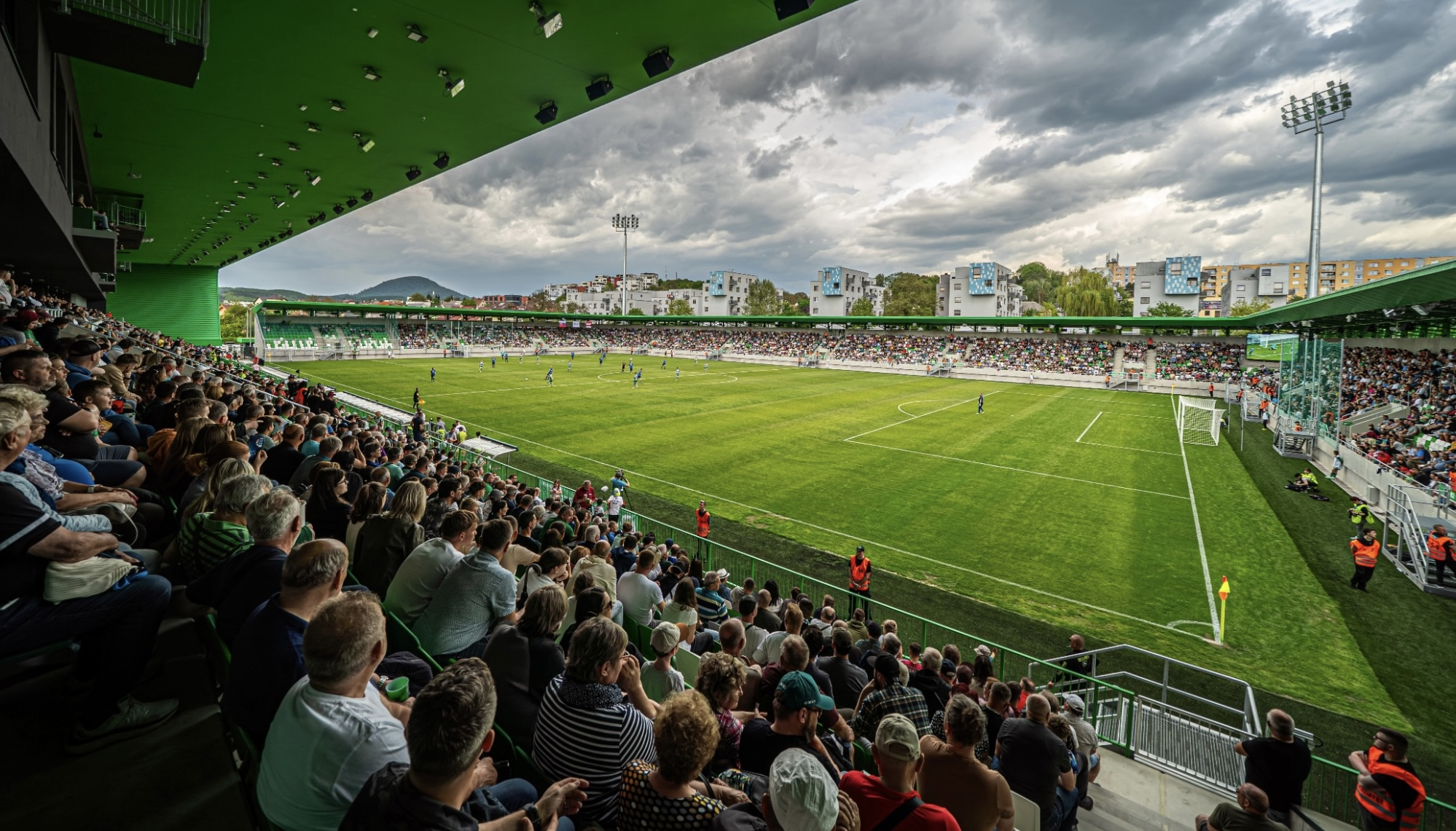
- UEFA
- Interactive map of Futbal Tatran Arena
- Location: Čapajevova 47, 080 01 Prešov, Slovakia
- Coordinates: 49°00′24.32″N 21°14′04.43″E
- Owner: Futbal Tatran Aréna
- Operator: 1. FC Tatran Prešov
- Capacity: 6,334
- Surface: Grass
- Field size: 105×68 m

Construction
- Built: 1907
- Renovated: 1945, 1994, 2009, 2017–2018, 2023–2025
- Cost: 24 million € (expected construction cost) in 2023–2025
- Architect: VSV consulting Slovakia
- Main contractor: AVA-stav

Tenants
- 1. FC Tatran Prešov (1945–present); FC Polissya Zhytomyr (2025) European matches UEFA U-21 Championship (2025)

Website
- https://www.tatran-arena.sk/

Tatran Stadium (Štadión Tatran Prešov in Slovak) is a multi-purpose stadium in Prešov, Slovakia. Currently, it is used for association football matches and it hosted the 2025 UEFA European Under-21 Championship in Slovakia. The stadium has been under reconstruction until June 2025. The stadium new capacity should be 6,500 spectators (all seated) after reconstruction. The stadium old capacity was 5,410 spectators (all seated).

== Early history ==
The first playing field was built in 1899. In 1907, the stadium had a capacity of 400 people. During the World War II bombing, the stadium was damaged and burned out. In 1945-47 new tribunes with 4500 seats were built. In 1994, the capacity was increased to 7,900, of which 2,000 were seated. Due to renovation work in 2009 the capacity was then decreased to 5,410 (all seats).

== 2017–2025 reconstruction ==
Between 2017–2025, the current stadium will be replaced by new modern all-sitting arena with capacity of 6,500 spectators. The cost of the reconstruction is €24 million. Slovak Football Association provided €2.4 million of the cost, Sports Fund provided €4.8 million and both, City of Prešov and Prešov Self-governing Region provided €7.4 million.

=== Ownership ===
Tatran Futbal arena is owned by the city of Prešov and Prešov Self-governing Region.

== International matches ==
Tatran Stadium has hosted one competetive and one friendly match of the Slovakia national football team.

14 May 2002 International Friendly	Slovakia	4–1	Uzbekistan	Prešov, Slovakia
Match 94	Vratislav Greško 5'; Jozef Kožlej 47', 79'; Marek Mintál 85'	Report	Zaynitdin Tadjiyev 48'	Stadium: Štadión Tatran; Attendance: 3,850; Referee: Albeth (Norway)

26 September 2026 UEFA Nations League	Slovakia	2–0	Moldova	Prešov, Slovakia
20:45	Schranz 32'; Duda 40' (pen.)	Report		Stadium: Futbal Tatran Arena; Attendance: 6,003; Referee: Juxhin Xhaja (Albania)

== Image gallery ==
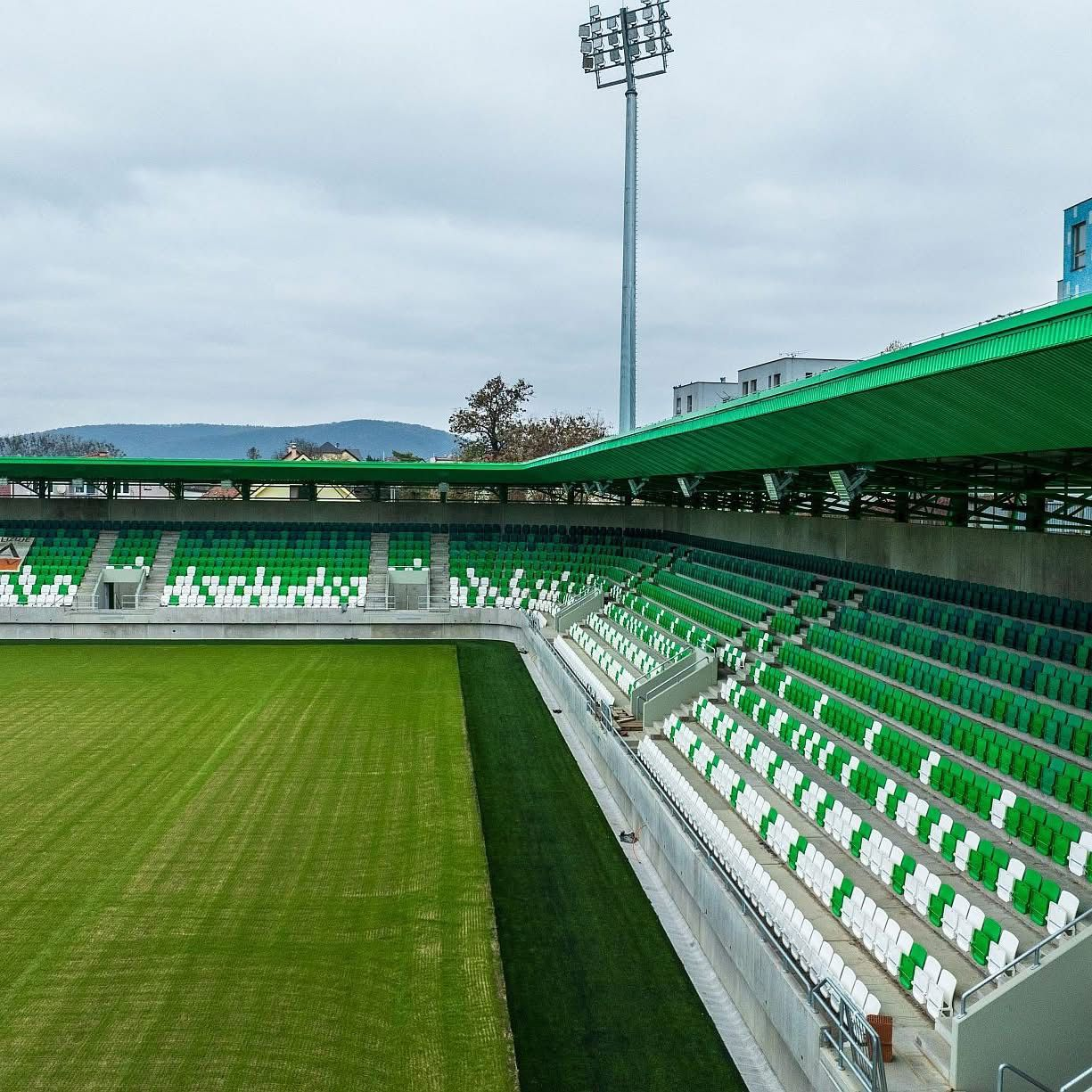
