= MFK Nováky =

- Full name: Mestký futbalový klub Nováky
- Founded: 1937
- Dissolved: 2015 (became Iskra Nováky)
- Ground: Stadium MFK Nováky, Nováky, Slovakia
- Capacity: 3,500 (980 seated)
- League: I. trieda (Tier 7, OFZ Priviedza)
- 2014–15: 14th (relegated to Tier 8)

MFK Nováky was a Slovak association football club located in Nováky. It recently plays in Slovak 4. liga.

== Club name history ==
- 1937 – Vojenská XI Nováky
- 1938 – ŠK Nováky
- 1949 – Sokol Chemozávod Nováky
- 1959 – Iskra Nováky
- 1967 – TJ CHZWP Nováky
- 1989 – TJ NCHZ Nováky
- 1992 – FK NCHZ - DAK Nováky
- 1995 – FK NCHZ Nováky
- 2004 – FK Nováky
- 2006 – MFK Nováky
