= FK ŠKP Inter Dúbravka Bratislava =

FKP Dúbravka
- Full name: Futbalový klub polície Dúbravka Bratislava
- Founded: 1946 as TKNB Bratislava
- Dissolved: 2015
- Ground: Stadium ŠKP Inter Dúbravka; Dúbravka
- Capacity: 10.500
- Chairman: Miroslav Mravec
- Manager: Bohumil Bizoň
- 14th
Home colours

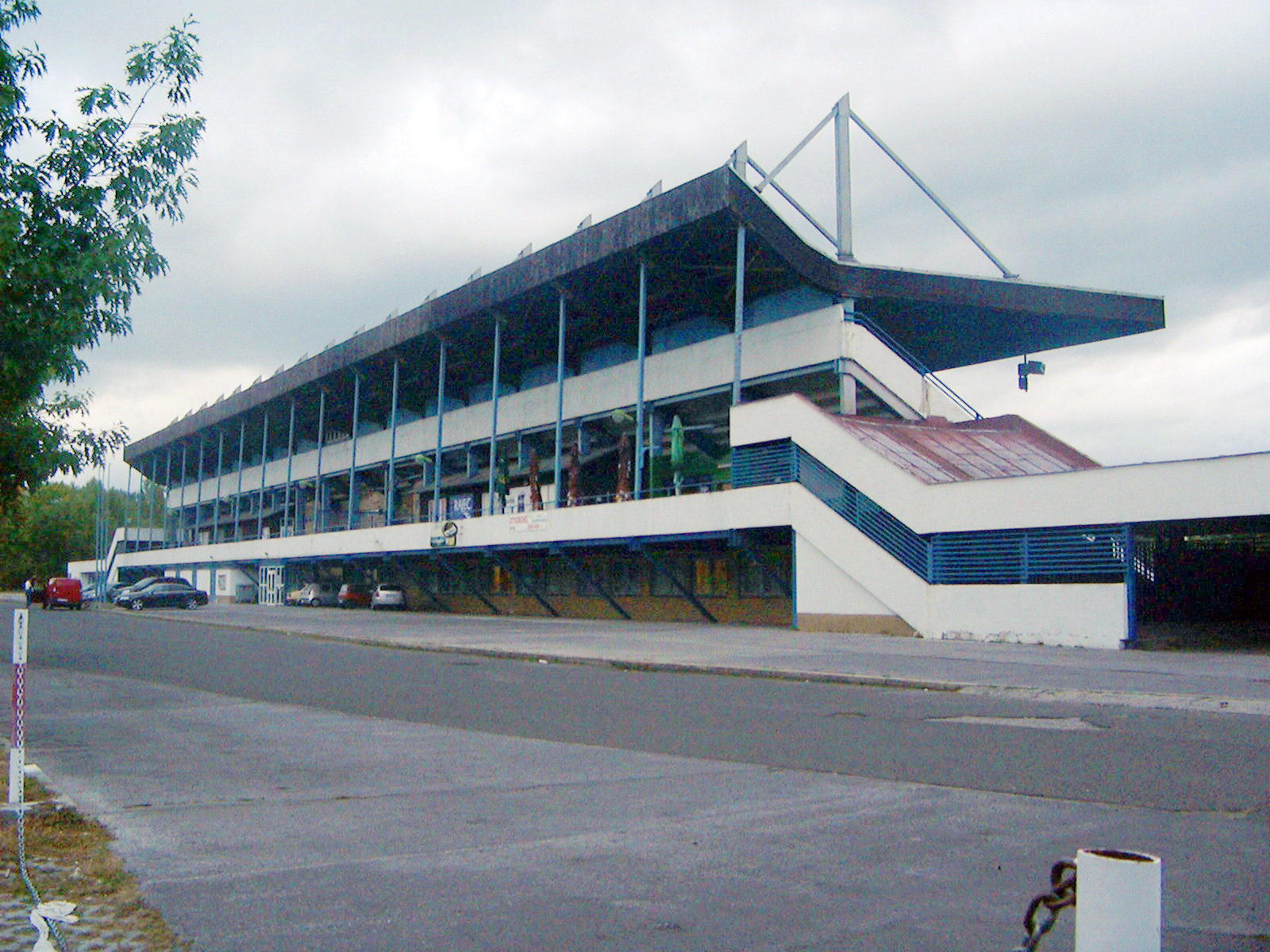
Stadium of FK ŠKP Inter Dúbravka Bratislava.

FKP Dubravka is a academy Slovak football team, based in the town of Dúbravka, Bratislava.

== History ==
The club was founded in 1946. The club play their home games at the 10.500 capacity Stadium ŠKP Inter Dúbravka.

In 2015, the senior club was dissolved due to financial problems.

=== Club names ===
- Telovýchovný klub národnej bezpečnosti Bratislava (from 1946 to 1948, TKNB)
- Sokol Sbor národnej bezpečnosti Bratislava (from 1948 to 1952, Sokol SNB)
- Sokol Červená hviezda Bratislava (from 1952 to 1953, Sokol Čh)
- Ústredný dom Červenej hviezdy Bratislava (from 1953 to 1956, ÚD Čh)
- Telovýchovná Jednota Červená hviezda Bratislava (from 1956 to 1990, TJ Čh)
- Športový klub polície Bratislava (from 1990 to 1997, ŠKP)
- Športový klub polície Devín (from 1997 to 2003, ŠKP)
- FC Športový klub polície Dúbravka Bratislava (from 2003 to 2009, FC ŠKP)
- Športový klub polície Inter Dúbravka Bratislava (from 2009, ŠKP Inter)

== Notable players ==
Had international caps for their respective countries. Players whose name is listed in bold represented their countries while playing for SKP.

- (Slovakia) Csaba Horváth
- (Slovakia) Pavol Majerník
- (Slovakia) Kamil Susko

== Notable coaches ==
- (Slovakia) Vladimír Goffa (−1999)
- (Slovakia) Koloman Gögh (2005–20??)
- (Slovakia) Vladimír Koník (2007–2008)
- (Slovakia) Martin Stano (2008)
- (Slovakia) Ľubomír Bohúň (2008–2009)
