= FC Baník Prievidza =

Slovak football club

- Full name: FC Baník Prievidza
- Founded: 1919; 107 years ago as PAC Prievidza
- Ground: Futbalový štadión Prievidza, Prievidza
- Capacity: 7,500
- Owner: Dávid Hancko
- President: Robert Šuník
- Coach: Filip Hlohovský
- League: 3. Liga (Slovakia)
- 2025-26: 3rd
- Website: http://www.fcbanikhn.sk

FC Baník Prievidza is a Slovak football club, playing in the town of Prievidza. In 1993–2000, the club played in the highest level of Slovak football, the Slovak First Football League.

Following the 2006–07 season, HFK Prievidza was promoted to the Slovak First League (second level of Slovak football). The club finished in 6th place for the 2007–08 season. Beginning with the 2008–09 season, the club changed its name to FK Mesto Prievidza. In 2009–10, the club withdrew from the Slovak First League.

== Club history ==
- 1919 – PAC Prievidza
- 1929 – ŠK Prievidza
- 1943 – SOHG Prievidza
- 1948 – Sokol Prievidza
- 1949 – Sokol Carpatia Prievidza
- 1954 – Merger of Baník Novaky and Baník Prievidza
- 1961 – TJ Baník Prievidza
- 1994 – MFK Prievidza
- 1995 – FK Petrimex Prievidza
- 1998 – FK Baník Prievidza
- 2003 – HFK Prievidza (resulted from the merger of MŠK TOPVAR, Horná Nitra Topoľčany and FK Baník Prievidza)
- 2008 – FK Mesto Prievidza
- 2011 – FC Baník Horná Nitra (ŠKF Baník Handlová merged with FK Prievidza 2010)
- 2017 – FC Baník Prievidza

== Honours ==
=== Domestic ===
Czechoslovakia

- 1. SNL (1st Slovak National football league) (1969–1993)
  - Winners (1): 1971–72

== Affiliated clubs ==
The following clubs are currently affiliated with FC Baník Horná Nitra:

- (Slovakia) AS Trenčín (2011–present)
- (Slovakia) MŠK Žilina (2013–present)

== Current squad ==
As of 1 August 2025

Note: Flags indicate national team as defined under FIFA eligibility rules; some limited exceptions apply. Players may hold more than one non-FIFA nationality.

No.	Pos.	Nation	Player
―	FW	SVK	Peter Bryndziar
―	FW	SVK	Adrian Lutka
―	DF	SVK	Lukáš Michaleje
―	DF	SVK	Jakub Zábojník

No.	Pos.	Nation	Player
―	DF	SVK	Peter Šinko
―	FW	GAM	Lamin Sambou
33	MF	SVK	Juraj Kucka

== Notable players ==
Had international caps for their respective countries. Players whose name is listed in bold represented their countries while playing for Baník.

For full list, see Category:FC Baník Prievidza players

- (Slovakia) Ivan Belák
- (Czechoslovakia) Karol Dobiaš
- (Czechoslovakia) Karol Jokl
- (Slovakia) Dávid Hancko
- (Slovakia) Filip Hlohovský
- (Slovakia) Patrik Hrošovský
- (Slovakia) Martin Králik
- (Slovakia) Dávid Krčík
- (Slovakia) Miloš Krško
- (Slovakia) František Kubík
- (Slovakia) Juraj Kucka
- (Czechoslovakia) (Slovakia) Anton Malatinský
- (Slovakia) Ján Mucha
- (Slovakia) Peter Németh
- (Slovakia) Branislav Obžera
- (Slovakia) Filip Oršula
- (Czechoslovakia) Ladislav Petráš
- (Slovakia) Martin Petráš
- (Slovakia) Martin Škrtel
- (Czechoslovakia) Anton Švajlen
- (Slovakia) Ján Vlasko
- (Czechoslovakia) Vladimír Weiss

== Notable managers ==
- (Slovakia) Milan Albrecht (2004)
- (Slovakia) Vladimír Goffa
- (Slovakia) Vladimír Rusnák (2008–2009)
- (Slovakia) Dušan Uškovič (2011–2012)
- (Slovakia) Viliam Ilko (2012–2014)
- (Slovakia) Peter Černák (2014–2016)
- (Slovakia) Juraj Pekár (2017)
- (Slovakia) Roman Slaný (2017–208)
- (Slovakia) Vladimir Helbich (2018–2019)
- (Slovakia) Ján Hancko (2021-?)
- (Slovakia) Filip Hlohovský (2024-)
