= Štadión Lokomotívy =

Football stadium in Košice, Slovakia

Štadión Lokomotívy v Čermeli
- Čermel
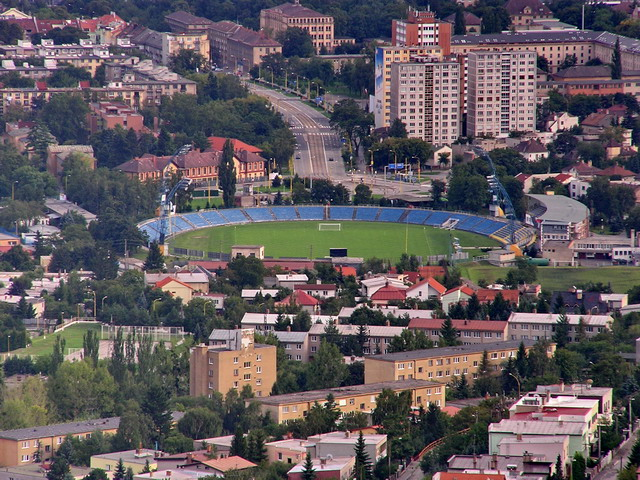
- Interactive map of Štadión Lokomotívy v Čermeli
- Full name: Štadión Lokomotívy v Čermeli
- Location: Čermeľská 1, 040 01 Košice, Slovakia
- Coordinates: 48°44′27″N 21°14′40″E
- Owner: TJ Lokomotíva a.s.
- Capacity: 9,000
- Surface: Grass
- Field size: 105×75 m

Construction
- Opened: 1970
- Renovated: 1997

Tenants
- Lokomotíva Košice (1970 – 1997, 2022 – cur.); FC VSS Košice (1997 – 2017); FC Košice (2017 – 2021); Slovakia (1998)

Štadión Lokomotívy v Čermeli is a multi-purpose stadium in Košice, Slovakia. It is currently used mostly for football matches. From 1997 it was the home stadium for Lokomotiva's rival, FC VSS Košice, until its dissolvation 20 years later. It was then used by the newly founded FC Košice and from the summer of 2022, FC Lokomotíva Košice returned to the stadium after 25 years. The stadium holds 9000 people and was built in 1970.

== History ==
The stadium is in the Čermeľ district, a multi-use stadium in Košice, Slovakia. It is currently used mostly for football matches as the home ground of VSS Košice since 1997. The stadium holds 10,787 (8,787 seated) spectators and was built in 1970. Initially, the stadium was used by Lokomotíva Košice and 1.FC Košice (later VSS) have played there since 1997 until last year. The Slovakia national football team played there a few matches, but the stadium does not meet UEFA criteria for international events today. The club planned the construction of a new stadium for 20,000 spectators in the neighbourhood of the old, disused Všešportový areál stadium. The estimated cost of the stadium is €28 million. However, the construction was not launched and it is not clear when it starts.

== Photo gallery ==
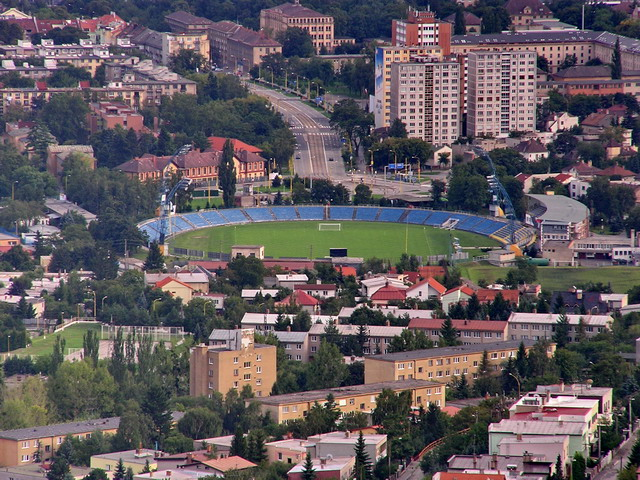

== International matches ==
Lokomotíva stadium has hosted one friendly and one competitive match of the Slovakia national football team.

19 August 1998 International Friendly	Slovakia	0–0	Finland	Košice, Slovakia
		Report		Stadium: Lokomotíva Stadium; Attendance: 3,220; Referee: Miroslav Liba

5 September 1998 UEFA Euro 2000 qualifying Group 7	Slovakia	3–0	Azerbaijan	Košice, Slovakia
20:15	Martin Fabuš 17'; Peter Dubovský 26' (pen.); Ľubomír Moravčík 37'	Report		Stadium: Lokomotíva Stadium; Attendance: 3,243; Referee: Alan Snoddy (Northern Ireland)

== Concerts ==
=== List of concerts ===
Date	Performer(s)	Reference
1 June 2016	Nightwish	
