= ŠK Futura Humenné =

- Full name: Športový Klub Futura Humenné
- Founded: 1903; 123 years ago as Homonnai Athlétikai Club
- Dissolved: 2015 (merged with 1. FK Svidník)
- Ground: Chemlon Stadion
- Capacity: 4,750
Home colours	Away colours

ŠK Futura Humenné was a Slovak football team, based in the town of Humenné. During the summer of 2015, ŠK Futura sold their license to Svidník.

The club played in the Cup Winners' Cup, and were part of the Slovak First Football League for most of their existence.

== History ==
Under the then name FC Chemlon Humenné, the club won the Slovak Cup in 1996 in the final against Spartak Trnava, beating them 2–1 in Vranov nad Topľou. Subsequently, the club defeated the Albanian team Flamurtari Vlora 3–0 on aggregate in the 1st round of the Cup Winners' Cup. In the 2nd round, they met the Greek club AEK Athens, after which Athens advanced. Humenné took the lead in the home match already in the 19th second of the match with a goal by club legend Pavol Diňa, but even a good performance in the rest of the match was not enough for the home team to advance.

The football club in Humenné raised players such as Ján Mucha and the late Marián Čišovský. However, after the collapse of the Chemlon factory, football in the city in eastern Slovakia began to decline, the club was renamed HFC and later 1. HFC Humenné. In 2009, due to financial problems, Humenné was moved to the third league and later completely disappeared.

=== Historic timeline ===
- 1903 Founded as Homonnai Athlétikai Club (Hungarian). Humensky Atleticky Klub (Slovak).
- 1920 Renamed HAC Humenné
- 1948 Renamed Sokol Humenné
- 1949 Renamed HAC Humenné
- 1951 Renamed HAC CSZZ Humenné
- 1952 Renamed CSZZ Humenné
- 1953 Renamed DSO Tatran Humenné
- 1959 Merged with Lokomotive Humenné and Chemko Humenné
- 1967 Renamed TJ Chemko Humenné
- 1968 Renamed TJ LCHZZ Humenné
- 1973 Renamed TJ Chemlon Humenné
- 1991 Renamed FC Chemlon Humenné
- 1997 Renamed HFC Humenné
- 2000 Renamed 1. HFC Humenné
- 2012 Renamed ŠK Futura Humenné

== Honours ==
=== Domestic ===
- 1.SNL (1st Slovak National football league) (1969–1993)
  - Winners (1): 1976–77
- Slovenský Pohár (Slovak Cup) (1961–)
  - Winners (1): 1996

== European competition history ==
Season	Competition	Round	Country	Club	Home	Away	Aggregate
1996–97	UEFA Cup Winners' Cup	Qualifying Round	(Albania)	Flamurtari Vlorë	1–0	2–0	3–0
1996–97	UEFA Cup Winners' Cup	1. Round	(Greece)	AEK Athens	1–2	0–1	1–3

== Sponsorship ==
Period	Kit manufacturer	Shirt sponsor
1998–2001	ALEA	Chemlon
2001–2005	ALEA	Nylstar
2005–2006	ALEA	Rhodia
2006–2015	Umbro	NEXIS

== Notable players ==
Had international caps for their respective countries. Players whose name is listed in bold represented their countries while playing for Humenné.

For full list, see Category:ŠK Futura Humenné players

- (Slovakia) Juraj Buček
- (Slovakia) Marián Čišovský
- (Slovakia) Pavol Diňa
- (Slovakia) Peter Dzúrik
- (Slovakia) Dávid Guba
- (Slovakia) Martin Koscelník
- (Slovakia) Ján Mucha
- (Slovakia) Martin Obšitník
- (Slovakia) Dušan Sninský
- (Slovakia) Anton Šoltis
- (Slovakia) Vladislav Zvara
