= FC Senec =

- Full name: FC Senec
- Founded: 1990; 36 years ago as Koba Senec
- Dissolved: 2008 (merged with FK DAC 1904 Dunajská Streda)
- Ground: NTC Senec, Senec
- Capacity: 3,264
Home colours	Away colours

FC Senec was a football club from Senec, Slovakia. It existed in years 1994–2008. After the, 2007/2008 season it was merged with FK DAC 1904 Dunajská Streda.

== Previous names ==
- 1990 – STK Senec
- 1992 – FK Koba Senec
- 1995 – FK VTJ Koba Senec
- 2002 – FK Koba Senec
- 2004 – FC Senec

== Honours ==
=== Domestic ===
- Slovak League (1993–)
  - Best finish: 6th – 2006–07
- Slovak Cup (1961–)
  - Winners (1): 2002
  - Runners-Up (1): 2007
- Slovak Super Cup (1993–)
  - Winners (1): 2002

== European competition history ==
Season	Competition	Round	Country	Club	Home	Away	Aggregate
2002–03	UEFA Cup	Qualifying Round	(Bosnia and Herzegovina)	Široki Brijeg	1–2	0–3	1–5

== Sponsorship ==
Period	Kit manufacturer	Shirt sponsor
1998–2000	Uhlsport	KOBA
2000–2003	NIKE	KOBA
2003–2004	Legea	KOBA
2004–2005	Adidas	KOBA
2005–2006	Kappa	I LOVE SENEC
2006–07	NIKE	Astrium-Hotels.de
2007–2008	Umbro	Kenvelo

== Notable players ==
Players whose name is listed in bold represented their respective countries while playing for Senec.

For full list, see Category:FC Senec players

- (Slovakia) Ľubomír Guldan
- (Slovakia) Ľuboš Hanzel
- (Slovakia) **Ľubomír Michalík**
- (Slovakia) Krisztián Németh
- (Slovakia) Ján Novota
- (Slovakia) Dušan Perniš
- (Slovakia) Attila Pinte
- (Slovakia) Július Šimon
- (Slovakia) Milan Timko
- (Slovakia) Marek Ujlaky
