= List of 1. FC Tatran Prešov managers =

1. FC Tatran Prešov is a professional football club based in Prešov, Slovakia, which plays in the Slovak First League. This chronological list comprises all those who have held the position of manager of the first team of Tatran Prešov from 1898.

The first manager of Tatran Prešov was Austro-Hungarian František Pethe.

== List of Tatran managers ==
- (Austria-Hungary) František Pethe (1898–04)
- (Hungary) Iszer Károly (sept 1898)
- (Slovakia) Bohumil Peťura (1940–41)
- (Slovakia) Július Grobár (1941–42)
- (Slovakia) Jozef Kuchár (1942–43)
- (Slovakia) Július Grobár (1943)
- (Slovakia) Vojtech Herdický (1943)
- (Hungary) Ferenc Szedlacsek (1950)
- (Czechoslovakia) Jozef Karel (1951–57)
- (Czechoslovakia) Jozef Steiner (1957–59)
- (Czechoslovakia) Gejza Šimanský (1959)
- (Czechoslovakia) Štefan Jačianský (1960–61)
- (Czechoslovakia) Jozef Kuchár (1961–62)
- (Czechoslovakia) Gejza Sabanoš (1962–64)
- (Czechoslovakia) Jozef Karel (1964–65)
- (Czechoslovakia) Jozef Steiner (1965–66)
- (Czechoslovakia) Jozef Karel (1966)
- (Czechoslovakia) Teodor Reimann (1967–68)
- (Czechoslovakia) Jozef Karel (1968–72)
- (Czechoslovakia) Milan Moravec (1972–74)
- (Czechoslovakia) Ladislav Pavlovič (1974)
- (Czechoslovakia) Jozef Tarcala (1975)
- (Czechoslovakia) Štefan Jačianský (1976–78)
- (Czechoslovakia) Belo Malaga (1978–79)
- (Czechoslovakia) Michal Baránek (1979)
- (Czechoslovakia) Štefan Hojsík (1979–81)
- (Czechoslovakia) Ján Zachar (1981–82)
- (Czechoslovakia) Valér Švec (1982–84)
- (Czechoslovakia) Jozef Jarabinský (1984–85)
- (Czechoslovakia) Justin Javorek (1985–86)
- (Czechoslovakia) Peter Majer (1986–87)
- (Czechoslovakia) Juraj Mihalčín (1987–88)
- (Czechoslovakia) Albert Rusnák (1988)
- (Czechoslovakia) Štefan Nadzam (1989–93)
- (Slovakia) Igor Novák (1993–94)
- (Slovakia) Belo Malaga (1994–95)
- (Slovakia) Anton Jánoš (1995–97)
- (Slovakia) Andrej Daňko (1997–98)
- (Slovakia) Jozef Adamec (1998–99)
- (Slovakia) Mikuláš Komanický (1999–01)
- (Czech Republic) Jindřich Dejmal (2001–02)
- (Slovakia) Vladimír Gombár (2002)
- (Slovakia) Ján Molka (2002)
- (Slovakia) Vladimír Gombár (2002–04)
- (Slovakia) Karol Kisel (2004)
- (Slovakia) Mikuláš Komanický (2004–05)
- (Slovakia) Štefan Horný (July 2005–Sept 05)
- (Slovakia) Jaroslav Rybár (Sept 2005–06)
- (Lithuania) Saulius Širmelis (Jan 2006–July 6)
- (Slovakia) Ján Karaffa (July 2006)
- (Slovakia) Jozef Daňko (Aug 2006)
- (Slovakia) Peter Polák (Aug 2006–Feb 07)
- (Slovakia) Roman Pivarník (Feb 2007–Aug 10)
- (Slovakia) Ladislav Pecko (Sept 2010–June 11)
- (Slovakia) Štefan Tarkovič (July 2011–Jan 12)
- (Ukraine) Serhiy Kovalets (Jan 2012–June 12)
- (Bulgaria) Angel Chervenkov (July 2012–Nov 12)
- (Slovakia) Ladislav Totkovič (Nov 2012–April 13)
- (Slovakia) Jozef Bubenko (April 2013–May 13)
- (Slovakia) Jozef Kostelník (June 2013-May 14)
- (Slovakia) Stanislav Varga (July 2014-October 14, 2016)
- (Slovakia) Ján Karaffa (carateker) (October 2016)
- (Slovakia) Miroslav Jantek (Nov 1, 2016-Sept 24, 2017)
- (Slovakia) Pavol Mlynár (Sept 24, 2017-Oct 8, 2017) (interim)
- (Ukraine) Serhiy Kovalets (Oct 8, 2017-Jan 24, 2018)
- (Czech Republic) Anton Mišovec (Jan 24, 2018-Apr 12 2019)
- (Slovakia) Jaroslav Galko (April 12 2019-June 30 2019)
- (Slovakia) Peter Petráš (July 7 2019-July 2021)
- (Slovakia) Stanislav Šesták (July 23 2021-June 2022)
- (Slovakia) Róbert Petruš (July 23 2021-June 2022)
- (Slovakia) Marek Petruš (June 2022-June 2023)
- (Slovakia) Peter Hlinka (June 2023-September 2023)
- (Slovakia) Marek Petruš (September 2023-March 2025)
- (Czech Republic) Jaroslav Hynek (March 2025-August 2025)
- (Slovakia) Vladimír Cifranič (August 2025-March 2026)
- (Slovakia) Jozef Kostelník (March 2026)
- (Slovakia) Erik Havrila (March 2026-)
