= Stanislav Kišš =

Slovak footballer

Personal information
- Date of birth: 16 December 1978 (age 47)
- Place of birth: Prešov, Czechoslovakia
- Height: 1.80 m (5 ft 11 in)
- Position: Right back

Team information
- Current team: TJ Rozvoj Pušovce

Youth career
- Tatran Prešov

Senior career*
Years	Team	Apps	(Gls)
- FC Petrovany
1999–2001	Ličartovce		
2001–2002	Vranov nad Topľou		
2002–2005	Ličartovce		
2005–2009	MFK Košice	84	(1)
2010–2011	ŽP ŠPORT Podbrezová		
2011–	TJ Družstevník Župčany		
2013–	→ TJ Rozvoj Pušovce (loan)		
- * Club domestic league appearances and goals as of 26 July 2011

Stanislav Kišš (born 16 December 1978 in Prešov) is a professional Slovak football defender who currently plays for TJ Rozvoj Pušovce.

== Career statistics ==
Club	Season	League		Domestic Cup		Europe		Total	
Club	Season	Pld	GF	Pld	GF	Pld	GF	Pld	GF
MFK Košice	2006/07	34	0	1	0	0	0	35	0
MFK Košice	2007/08	17	0	4	0	0	0	21	0
MFK Košice	2008/09	15	1	4	0	0	0	19	1
MFK Košice	2009/10	18	0	3	0	4	0	25	0
Total		84	1	12	0	4	0	100	1

^{Last updated: 28 December 2009}
