= Vladimír Rusnák =

Slovak footballer and manager

Personal information
- Full name: Vladimír Rusnák
- Date of birth: 3 August 1950 (age 76)
- Place of birth: Stropkov, Czechoslovakia

Senior career*
Years	Team	Apps	(Gls)
- Stropkov
- ZVL Žilina
- Dubnica
- Trenčín
- Prešov

Managerial career
- Stropkov
- Giraltovce
- Bardejov
- Prešov
- Ružomberok
- 1998–1999: Dunajská Streda
- Rimavská Sobota
- Ružomberok
- Humenné
- 2005–2008: Lučenec
- 2008–2009: Prievidza
- 2009–2010: Liptovský Mikuláš
- 2010–2011: Ružiná
- 2011–2012: Ružomberok B
- 2012–2013: Ružiná
- 2014: FK Slavoj Trebišov
- 2017-18: FK Slavoj Trebišov
- 2018: MŠK Tesla Stropkov
- 2018-20: FK Slavoj Trebišov
- 2020-: FK Sobrance -Sobranecko
- * Club domestic league appearances and goals as of 12 May 2017

Vladimír Rusnák (born 3 August 1950) is a Slovak former football player and former manager of MŠK Tesla Stropkov. He is also known for managing Slovak First Football League club MFK Zemplín Michalovce in 2023.

== Playing career ==
He started his football career at Tesla Stropkov. In the Czechoslovak league he played for ZVL Žilina, Jednota Trenčín and Tatran Prešov. He played in 260 matches and scored 31 goals.
