= Marek Seman =

Slovak football defender (born 1976)

Personal information
- Full name: Marek Seman
- Date of birth: 27 February 1976 (age 50)
- Place of birth: Czechoslovakia
- Height: 1.80 m (5 ft 11 in)
- Positions: Midfielder; fullback

Team information
- Current team: TJ Rozvoj Pušovce
- Number: 6

Youth career
- TJ Hendrichovce

Senior career*
Years	Team	Apps	(Gls)
–2002	Prešov	125	(13)
2002–2003	Synot Staré Město		
2004–2006	Trenčín	28	(1)
2006–2007	Banská Bystrica	16	(1)
2008–2009	Moldava nad Bodvou		
2010–2013	Bardejov	26	(4)
2013–	Pušovce		
- * Club domestic league appearances and goals as of 18 September 2013 ‡ National team caps and goals as of 3 April 2011

Marek Seman (born 27 February 1976) is a Slovak football defender who currently plays for TJ Rozvoj Pušovce. His former club was Partizán Bardejov.
