= Matúš Štefančík =

Slovak footballer

Personal information
- Full name: Matúš Štefančík
- Date of birth: 13 December 1995 (age 30)
- Place of birth: Slovakia
- Position: Defender

Team information
- Current team: Vranov nad Topľou
- Number: 19

Youth career
- Stropkov
- 2014–2015: → Prešov (loan)

Senior career*
Years	Team	Apps	(Gls)
2016–2017	TJ Slovan Pečovská Nová Ves		
2016–2017	→ Prešov (loan)	1	(0)
2017–	Vranov nad Topľou	16	(1)
- * Club domestic league appearances and goals as of 20 January 2018

Matúš Štefančík (born 13 December 1995) is a Slovak footballer who plays for MFK Vranov nad Topľou as a defender.

== Career ==
=== 1. FC Tatran Prešov ===
Štefančík made his professional debut for 1. FC Tatran Prešov against MFK Zemplín Michalovce on 18 March 2017.
