= 1963–64 Czechoslovak First League =

Czechoslovak First League
- Season: 1963–64
- Champions: Dukla Prague
- Relegated: TŽ Třinec; Spartak Hradec Králové; Spartak Motorlet Praha
- European Cup: Dukla Prague
- Cup Winners' Cup: Spartak Praha Sokolovo
- Fairs Cup: Spartak ZJŠ Brno
- Top goalscorer: Ladislav Pavlovič (21 goals)

Statistics of Czechoslovak First League in the 1963–64 season.

== Overview ==
It was contested by 14 teams, and Dukla Prague won the championship. Ladislav Pavlovič was the league's top scorer with 21 goals.

== Stadia and locations ==
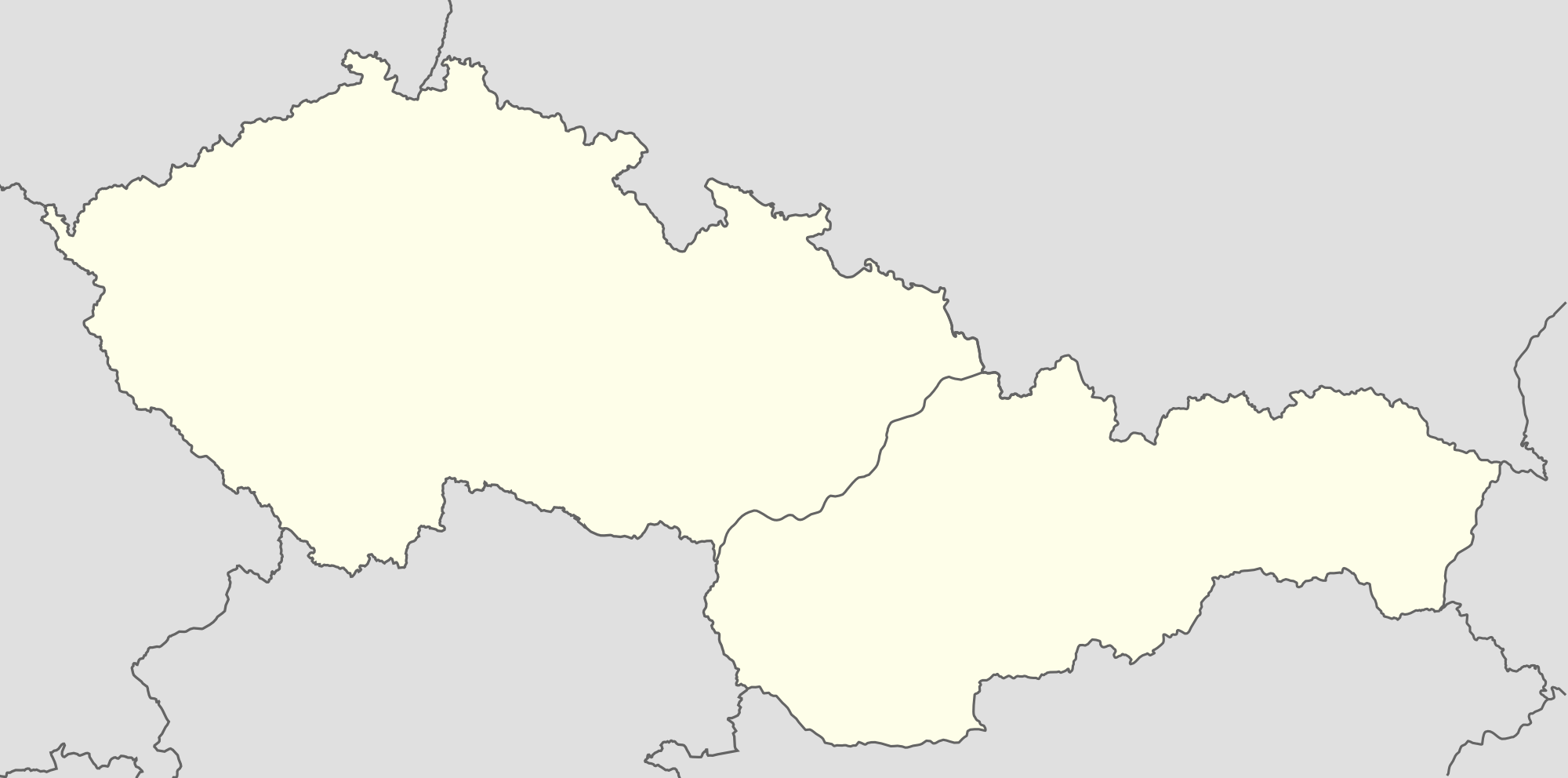
Location of clubs in the 1963–64 Czechoslovak First League

== League standings ==
Pos	Team	Pld	W	D	L	GF	GA	GR	Pts	Qualification or relegation
1	Dukla Prague (C)	26	16	5	5	52	26	2.000	37	Qualification for European Cup preliminary round
2	Slovan Bratislava	26	14	7	5	50	25	2.000	35	
3	Tatran Prešov	26	13	5	8	46	29	1.586	31	
4	Slovnaft Bratislava	26	11	8	7	42	25	1.680	30	
5	Baník Ostrava	26	11	8	7	51	36	1.417	30	
6	Spartak Prague Sokolovo	26	13	3	10	45	37	1.216	29	Qualification for Cup Winners' Cup first round
7	VSS Košice	26	12	5	9	40	32	1.250	29	
8	Jednota Trenčín	26	10	6	10	31	27	1.148	26	
9	Spartak ZJŠ Brno	26	7	11	8	31	32	0.969	25	Invitation for Inter-Cities Fairs Cup first round
10	ČKD Prague	26	11	2	13	34	43	0.791	24	
11	SONP Kladno	26	8	6	12	31	43	0.721	22	
12	TŽ Třinec (R)	26	8	5	13	28	66	0.424	21	Relegation to Czechoslovak Second League
13	Spartak Hradec Králové (R)	26	8	2	16	45	51	0.882	18	Relegation to Czechoslovak Second League
14	Spartak Motorlet Prague (R)	26	1	5	20	13	67	0.194	7	Relegation to Czechoslovak Second League

Source: rsssf.com
(C) Champions; (R) Relegated

== Results ==
Home \ Away	OST	ČKD	DUK	TRE	SLO	SLV	KLA	HRK	MOT	SPA	BRN	PRE	TŘI	KOŠ
Baník Ostrava		5–1	4–1	0–0	0–2	0–0	5–3	3–1	3–0	4–0	1–1	3–0	8–1	0–3
ČKD Prague	0–2		2–5	1–1	2–0	2–0	1–0	5–3	2–0	3–2	3–0	0–1	3–2	0–1
Dukla Prague	3–1	3–0		2–1	0–1	1–1	2–0	1–0	4–0	1–0	1–0	4–1	8–0	1–0
Jednota Trenčín	2–0	2–0	0–1		2–1	0–2	1–0	5–2	6–0	0–0	3–0	1–1	0–1	2–0
Slovan Bratislava	4–1	4–0	2–1	0–0		1–1	3–0	1–0	3–1	5–1	1–3	3–2	8–0	0–0
Slovnaft Bratislava	0–1	3–1	1–0	2–0	0–0		1–0	2–1	5–0	1–0	2–0	2–1	6–0	2–2
SONP Kladno	1–1	0–3	3–3	1–0	2–2	3–0		2–0	2–0	2–2	1–1	1–0	4–1	2–1
Spartak Hradec Králové	2–2	0–1	0–1	1–3	2–0	2–1	1–0		1–1	3–4	2–1	5–1	3–0	5–1
Spartak Motorlet Prague	1–1	0–1	1–1	0–1	1–2	1–1	2–3	1–7		0–5	1–1	0–4	0–1	2–1
Spartak Sokolovo Prague	3–2	1–0	2–3	2–0	1–2	1–0	2–1	5–2	3–1		1–0	1–0	4–1	4–0
Spartak ZJŠ Brno	0–0	2–1	1–1	2–0	0–0	3–3	0–0	4–0	2–0	2–0		1–1	4–0	2–2
Tatran Prešov	4–0	2–0	1–0	5–0	3–1	2–1	7–0	2–0	1–0	1–1	1–1		2–0	1–1
TŽ Třinec	3–3	1–1	1–2	1–1	1–1	0–4	1–0	2–1	2–0	1–0	5–0	2–0		1–3
VSS Košice	0–1	3–1	3–1	2–0	1–3	2–1	3–0	2–1	4–0	2–0	2–0	1–2	0–0	

Source: statistiky1ligy.fotbal.cz
Legend: Blue = home team win; Yellow = draw; Red = away team win.
