= Michal Šmarda =

Michal Šmarda may refer to:

- Michal Šmarda (footballer)
- Michal Šmarda (politician)
