= Lukáš Hricov =

Slovak footballer

Personal information
- Full name: Lukáš Hricov
- Date of birth: 28 January 1984 (age 42)
- Place of birth: Prešov, Czechoslovakia
- Height: 1.77 m (5 ft 10 in)
- Position: Forward

Team information
- Current team: 1.FK Svidník

Youth career
- Prešov

Senior career*
Years	Team	Apps	(Gls)
–2004	Tatran Prešov		
2004–2009	AS Trenčín		
2005	→ Rimavská Sobota (loan)		
2006	→ LAFC Lučenec (loan)		
2007–2008	→ Humenné (loan)		
2009	→ LAFC Lučenec (loan)		
2010	Olimpia Elbląg		
2010–2011	Odeva Lipany		
2011–2012	Spišská Nová Ves		
2012	→ Stará Ľubovňa (loan)		
2012	Rozvoj Pušovce		
2013–2014	Tatran Liptovský Mikuláš		
2013	→ OŠK Kľušov (loan)		
2014	→ Tatran Zámutov (loan)		
2015	Rozvoj Pušovce		
2015	→ Svidník (loan)		
2015–2016	Svidník		
2017–	Soľ		
2017–2018	→ OŠK Fintice (loan)		
2018	→ MFK Gelnica (loan)		
2019	→ Tatran Prešov (loan)	12	(3)
2019–	→ Svidník (loan)		

International career
- Slovakia U20
- * Club domestic league appearances and goals as of 26 July 2019

Lukáš Hricov (born 28 January 1984) is a Slovak football forward who currently plays for 3. liga club 1.FK Svidník.
