= Roman Lazúr =

Slovak footballer

Personal information
- Full name: Roman Lazúr
- Date of birth: 23 November 1977 (age 48)
- Place of birth: Vranov nad Topľou, Czechoslovakia
- Height: 1.76 m (5 ft 9 1/2 in)
- Position: Attacking midfielder

Team information
- Current team: Vranov nad Topľou
- Number: 19

Youth career
- Vranov nad Topľou

Senior career*
Years	Team	Apps	(Gls)
?–2002	Vranov nad Topľou		
2002	→Prešov (loan)	13	(2)
2002–2003	1. FC Košice	25	(4)
2003–2005	Vranov nad Topľou		
2004	→Michalovce (loan)	11	(1)
2005	Ličartovce		
2005	MFK Košice	1	(0)
2005–2006	Humenné		
2006–2009	Rimavská Sobota		
2009–2011	Vranov nad Topľou		
2012	Trat F.C.		
2012–	Vranov nad Topľou		
- * Club domestic league appearances and goals as of 6 August 2012

Roman Lazúr (born 23 November 1977 in Vranov nad Topľou) is a Slovak football midfielder who currently plays for club MFK Vranov nad Topľou.

He previously played for clubs including Prešov.
