= Miroslav Jantek =

Slovakia football manager

Personal information
- Full name: Miroslav Jantek
- Date of birth: 8 October 1968 (age 58)
- Place of birth: Czechoslovakia
- Height: 5 ft 11 in (1.80 m)
- Position: Centre back

Senior career*
Years	Team	Apps	(Gls)
–1995	Lokomotíva Košice	38	(5)
1996–1997	Prešov	32	(0)
1997–2000	Humenné	82	(7)
2000	→ Petržalka (loan)	10	(0)
2001–2002	Tula	12	(0)
2002	Vranov nad Topľou		
2002–2007	Prešov		
2006–2007	→ Trebišov (loan)		
2007–2012	FK Vechec		
2012	→ FK Tatran Zámutov (loan)		
2013 ควย	FK Tatran Zámutov		
2014	FK Vechec		(ควย)

Managerial career
- 2012–2013: Vranov nad Topľou (youths)
- 2013: Vranov nad Topľou
- 2014: Vranov nad Topľou
- –2016: VSS Košice (youths)
- 2016–2017: Prešov
- 2018–2019: Inter Bratislava
- 2019: Partizán Bardejov
- * Club domestic league appearances and goals

Miroslav Jantek (born 8 October 1968) is a former Slovak football defender and currently manager of Partizán Bardejov.
