= Song Hwan-young =

South Korean association footballer

Personal information
- Date of birth: 11 October 1997 (age 29)
- Place of birth: South Korea
- Height: 1.80 m (5 ft 11 in)
- Position: Midfielder

Team information
- Current team: Slavoj Trebišov
- Number: 13

Senior career*
Years	Team	Apps	(Gls)
2019–2021	Chungnam Asan	12	(1)
2022–2023	FK Humenné	47	(5)
2024–	Slavoj Trebišov	9	(2)
- * Club domestic league appearances and goals as of 22 June 2024

Song Hwan-young (Korean: 송환영; born 11 October 1997) is a South Korean footballer who plays as a midfielder for Slavoj Trebišov.

== Early life and amateur career ==
Song started playing football as a fourth grader. He attended Yuseong Life Science High School in Daejeon, South Korea. Song attended Hanyang University, where he was the top scorer of the U-League.

== Club career ==
Song started his career with K League side Chungnam Asan. In 2022, he signed for Slovak side FK Humenné, where he was regarded to have immediately adapted to the club and country.

== International career ==
Song was called up to a South Korea youth national football team training camp for the 2020 Summer Olympics.

== Personal life ==
Song has an older brother.
