= Dávid Leško =

Slovak footballer

Personal information
- Full name: Dávid Leško
- Date of birth: 4 June 1988 (age 38)
- Place of birth: Prešov, Czechoslovakia
- Height: 1.73 m (5 ft 8 in)
- Position: Attacking midfielder

Team information
- Current team: Košice
- Number: 19

Youth career
- Tatran Prešov

Senior career*
Years	Team	Apps	(Gls)
2008–2015	Tatran Prešov	94	(37)
2008	→ HFC Humenné (loan)		
2011	→ Rimavská Sobota (loan)	18	(4)
2012–2013	→ Šarišské Michaľany (loan)		
2016	Senica	14	(2)
2016–2017	Tatran Prešov	29	(2)
2017–2019	Železiarne Podbrezová	59	(12)
2019–2020	Košice	16	(3)
- * Club domestic league appearances and goals as of 22:01, 23 January 2020 (UTC)

Dávid Leško (born 4 June 1988) is a Slovak football midfielder who last played for Košice.
