= Anton Jánoš =

Slovak footballer and manager

Personal information
- Full name: Anton Jánoš
- Date of birth: 28 February 1958 (age 68)
- Place of birth: Jablonové, Czechoslovakia
- Position: Goalkeeper

Senior career*
Years	Team	Apps	(Gls)
1977–1980	ČH Bratislava		
1980–1982	Inter Bratislava		
1982–1986	Trebišov		
1986–1987	ZŤS Malacky		
1987–1991	Banská Bystrica	25	(0)

Managerial career
- 1991–1993: Banská Bystrica (youth teams)
- 1993–1995: Banská Bystrica
- 1995–1997: Tatran Prešov
- 1997–1999: Žilina
- 1999–2000: Spartak Trnava
- 2001–2003: Banská Bystrica
- 2003–2005: Trenčín
- 2006–2008: Podbrezová
- 2008–2009: Banská Bystrica
- 2009–2010: MFK Banská Bystrica
- 2010–2011: SFM Senec
- 2011–2013: SFM Senec
- 2014: Ružiná
- 2014–2017: MFK Lokomotíva Zvolen
- * Club domestic league appearances and goals

Anton Jánoš (born 28 February 1958) is a former football goalkeeper from Slovakia and former manager of ŠK SFM Senec.

== Career ==
Jánoš played for clubs like TJ Internacionál Slovnaft Bratislava. He later transitioned into management, taking on roles at several Slovak clubs, such as MŠK Žilina (1998–1999), Spartak Trnava (1999–2000), and AS Trenčín (2004–2005)

== Honours ==
=== Manager ===
Tatran Prešov

- Slovak Cup: Runners-up: 1996-97

Dukla Banská Bystrica

- DOXXbet liga: Winners: 2002–03 (Promoted)
