= Ľuboš Belejík =

Slovak footballer (born 1985)

Personal information
- Full name: Ľuboš Belejík
- Date of birth: 23 September 1985 (age 41)
- Place of birth: Stará Ľubovňa, Czechoslovakia
- Height: 1.82 m (5 ft 11 1/2 in)
- Position: Striker

Team information
- Current team: 1. FC Tatran Prešov
- Number: 9

Youth career
- 1. FC Tatran Prešov

Senior career*
| Years | Team | Apps | (Gls) |
| 2007–2011 | 1. FC Tatran Prešov | 40 | (6) |
| 2011 | 1. FC Tatran Prešov B | | |
| 2013 | → OFK - SIM Raslavice (loan) | | |
| 2014– | 1. FC Tatran Prešov | 14 | (4) |
- * Club domestic league appearances and goals as of 2 August 2014

Ľuboš Belejík (born 23 September 1985 in Stará Ľubovňa) is a Slovak football player, who currently plays for 1. FC Tatran Prešov.
