= Milan Timko =

Slovak footballer (born 1972)

Personal information
- Date of birth: 28 November 1972 (age 53)
- Place of birth: Prešov, Czechoslovakia
- Height: 1.90 m (6 ft 3 in)
- Position: Defender

Youth career
- 1982–1984: Mikušovce
- 1984–1990: Tatran Prešov

Senior career*
Years	Team	Apps	(Gls)
1990–1992	Tatran Prešov		
1993–1994	VTJ KOBA Senec		
1994–1997	Artmedia Petržalka		
1997–1998	Baník Ostrava	48	(3)
1998–2000	Slovan Bratislava	69	(6)
2000–2002	Kocaelispor	29	(2)
2002–2003	Adanaspor	24	(0)
2003–2004	Aalborg BK	1	(0)
2004–2005	SV Ried		
2007	ASKÖ Ohlsdorf		

International career
1994–2002	Slovakia	29	(1)
- * Club domestic league appearances and goals

Milan Timko (born 28 November 1972) is a former Slovak football player.

Timko played for several top Slovak clubs before moving to Czech Baník Ostrava in 1997. In 1998 Timko moved to Slovan Bratislava, where he won the Slovak Superliga and Slovak Cup in 1999. He also played for several clubs in Turkey, Denmark and Austria. Timko was a regular for the Slovakia national football team.
