= Ľuboš Benkovský =

Slovak football manager

Personal information
- Date of birth: 22 February 1989 (age 37)
- Place of birth: Trnava, Czechoslovakia

Team information
- Current team: Slovakia (assistant)

Youth career
- –2008: Lokomotíva Trnava

Senior career*
Years	Team	Apps	(Gls)
2008–2009	ŠK Repasu Poľno Farma Jalšové		
2009	→ FO ŠK Modranka (loan)		
2009–2013	Horses Šúrovce		
2012–2013	→ Neded (loan)		
2013–	SC Gattendorf		

Managerial career
- 2009–2018: Spartak Trnava (youth)
- 2018–2019: Lokomotíva Košice
- 2019–2020: Slavoj Trebišov
- 2020–2022: ViOn Zlaté Moravce
- * Club domestic league appearances and goals

Ľuboš Benkovský (born 22 February 1989) is a Slovak professional football manager and former player who is currently the assistant coach of the Slovakia national team.
