= Miroslav Seman =

Slovak footballer

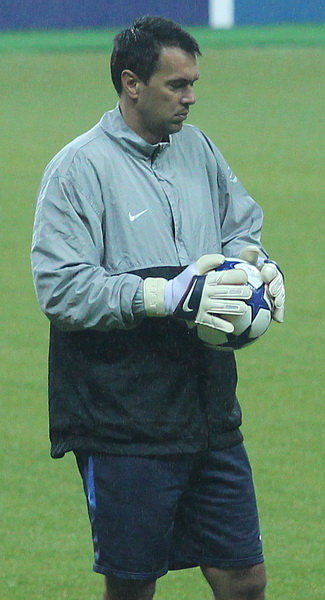

Personal information
- Date of birth: 14 January 1973 (age 53)
- Place of birth: Michalovce, Czechoslovakia
- Height: 1.90 m (6 ft 3 in)
- Position: Goalkeeper

Youth career
- 1980–1990: MFK Zemplín Michalovce

Senior career*
Years	Team	Apps	(Gls)
1991–1998	1. FC Tatran Prešov	112	(0)
1998–2001	1.FC Košice	55	(0)
2001–2004	České Budějovice	34	(0)
2004-2006	Nea Salamis Famagusta	39	(0)
2006-2008	MŠK Žilina	1	(0)
Total		241	(0)

International career^{‡}
1996–1998	Slovakia	3	(0)

Managerial career
- 2008–2020: MŠK Žilina (GK coach)
- 2020-: Slovakia (GK coach)
- 2024-: FK Železiarne Podbrezová (GK coach)
- * Club domestic league appearances and goals as of 13 September 2008 ‡ National team caps and goals as of 10 August 2008

Miroslav Seman (born 1 January 1973) is a retired Slovak football goalkeeper, who played during the 1990s and 2000s. He played for a number of clubs in Slovakia, Czech Republic and Cyprus.

== Career ==
In 2004, he signed for Nea Salamis Famagusta.
