= Jozef Kostelník =

Slovak footballer and manager

Personal information
- Full name: Jozef Kostelník
- Date of birth: 14 September 1970 (age 56)
- Place of birth: Prešov, Czechoslovakia
- Position: Midfielder

Team information
- Current team: Partizán Bardejov (manager)

Youth career
- Tatran Prešov

Senior career*
Years	Team	Apps	(Gls)
1987–1988	Tatran Prešov	15	(1)
1989–1993	Dukla Prague	49	(13)
1993–1994	Sparta Prague	29	(2)
1994	Dynamo České Budějovice	15	(1)
1995	Hradec Králové	1	(0)
1995	Sparta Prague	0	(0)
1995	Dynamo České Budějovice	7	(0)
1996	SK Tatran Poštorná	13	(4)
1996	Dynamo České Budějovice	6	(1)
1996	Žilina	3	(0)
1997	Dynamo České Budějovice	14	(3)
1998–1999	Hapoel Jerusalem	28	(4)
- Čaňa
- Ozex Solivar

Managerial career
- 2005–2008: Ozex Solivar (player-coach)
- 2008–2009: Tatran Prešov B (assistant)
- 2009: Tatran Prešov (assistant)
- Tatran Prešov B
- Odeva Lipany
- TJ Sokol Ľubotice
- 2012: Baník Ružiná
- 2012: Vranov nad Topľou
- 2013–2014: Tatran Prešov
- 2014: Sandecja Nowy Sącz
- 2015: Senica
- 2016: Liptovský Mikuláš
- 2016–2018: Skalica
- 2019–2022: Skalica
- 2022: Liptovský Mikuláš
- 2024–2025: Stará Ľubovňa
- 2026: Tatran Prešov
- 2026–: Partizán Bardejov
- * Club domestic league appearances and goals

Jozef Kostelník (born 14 September 1970) is a Slovak professional football manager and former player who is in charge of Partizán Bardejov.

== Honours ==
=== Manager ===
FK Senica

- Slovak Cup runner-up: 2015
