= Martin Dupkala =

Slovak footballer

Personal information
- Full name: Martin Dupkala
- Date of birth: 7 May 1985 (age 41)
- Place of birth: Czechoslovakia
- Height: 1.80 m (5 ft 11 in)
- Position: Midfielder

Team information
- Current team: TJ ŠM Dulová Ves
- Number: 7

Youth career
- FC OZEX-Solivar
- Tatran Prešov

Senior career*
Years	Team	Apps	(Gls)
2004–2012	Tatran Prešov		
2004–2006	→ AFK 93 Prešov (loan)		
2008–2010	→ Bodva Moldava nad Bodvou (loan)		
2010–2011	→ Odeva Lipany (loan)		
2011	→ Lokomotíva Košice (loan)		
2011–2012	→ Bodva Moldava nad Bodvou (loan)		
2012	→ Partizán Bardejov (loan)	6	(0)
2013	Hanácká Slavia Kroměříž		
2013–2014	Olomouc		
2014–2018	Tatran Prešov	57	(5)
2018–2020	Partizán Bardejov	25	(3)
2020	→ TJ ŠM Dulová Ves (loan)		
2020–	TJ ŠM Dulová Ves		
- * Club domestic league appearances and goals as of 8 January 2020

Martin Dupkala (born 7 May 1985) is a Slovak football midfielder who currently plays for TJ ŠM Dulová Ves.

== Club career ==
=== 1. FC Tatran Prešov ===
Dupkala made his professional Fortuna Liga debut for Tatran Prešov against Zemplín Michalovce on 24 July 2016.
