= Jindřich Dejmal =

Czech soccer coach (born 1948)

Personal information
- Date of birth: 4 July 1948 (age 78)
- Place of birth: Strakonice, Czechoslovakia

Team information
- Current team: TJ Otavan Poříčí

Managerial career
- Years: Team
- 1987–1989: SK Slavia Prague "B"
- 1990–1991: SK Slavia Prague /assistant/
- 1992–1993: SK Dynamo České Budějovice
- 1993: FC Olpran Drnovice
- 1993–1994: SK Slavia Prague
- 1995–1997: FK Jiskra Třeboň
- 1998–1999: FC Petra Drnovice
- 2000: FK Jablonec
- 2000–2001: SK Dynamo České Budějovice
- 2001: SK Klatovy
- 2001–2002: Tatran Prešov
- 2002–2004: Union Cheb
- 2005–2007: 1. FC Karlovy Vary
- 2007–2009: FK Spartak MAS Sezimovo Ústí
- 2009–2010: 1. FC Karlovy Vary
- 2011–2012: SK Strakonice 1908
- 2012–2013: SK Spartak Příbram
- 2013: TJ Otavan Poříčí
- 2014: FC Písek

Jindřich Dejmal (born 4 July 1948) is a Czech football manager who is the current sports director of FC Písek. In the past he managed a number of Gambrinus liga teams including FK Drnovice, FK Baumit Jablonec, SK Slavia Prague and Slovak club Tatran Prešov.

Dejmal joined Strakonice as manager in July 2011. He previously managed a number of clubs, including FK Jablonec in 2000 and SK Dynamo České Budějovice from 2000 until 2001 in the 2000–01 Gambrinus liga. In addition to this, he managed Klatovy in the Czech Fourth Division from 2001. Later he worked at 1. FC Karlovy Vary for two and a half years before moving to FK Spartak MAS Sezimovo Ústí in the summer of 2007. In the summer of 2009, he returned to Karlovy Vary. He left Karlovy Vary for the second time in 2010 on health grounds.
