= MFK Vranov nad Topľou =

Slovak football club

- Full name: Mestský futbalový klub Vranov nad Topľou
- Founded: 1901; 125 years ago
- Ground: Stadium MFK Vranov nad Topľou, Vranov nad Topľou
- Capacity: 5,000 (4,000 seats)
- President: Mikuláš Nemeš
- Head coach: Roman Lazúr
- League: 3. liga (East)
- 2025–26: 3. liga, 12th
- Website: http://www.mfkvranov.sk/
Home colours	Away colours

MFK Vranov nad Topľou is a Slovak football team, based in the town of Vranov nad Topľou. The club was founded in 1901 and has spent three years in the Czechoslovak second division and five years in the Slovak second tier.

MFK Vranov nad Topľou is the third oldest football club currently active in Slovakia.

== History ==
The history of organized football in Vranov nad Topľou began in 1901. In 1952, MFK Vranov advanced to the II. league for the first time, they achieved the same success in 1969, later the Vranov team was a regular participant in the and managed to return to the second highest competition in the 1995/1996 season. The club celebrated their 115th anniversary in 2016.

=== Historic names ===
- 1901 – founded
- ZSJ Priemstav Vranov (Závodná sokolská jednota Priemstav Vranov)
- DŠO Tatran Vranov (Dobrovoľná športová organizácia Tatran Vranov)
- TJ Lokomotíva Vranov nad Topľou (Telovýchovná jednota Lokomotíva Vranov nad Topľou)
- TJ Bukóza Vranov nad Topľou (Telovýchovná jednota Bukóza Vranov nad Topľou)
- FK Bukóza Vranov nad Topľou (Futbalový klub Bukóza Vranov nad Topľou)
- ŠK Bukocel Vranov nad Topľou (Športový klub Bukocel Vranov nad Topľou)
- MFK Vranov nad Topľou (Mestský futbalový klub Vranov nad Topľou)

== Stadium ==
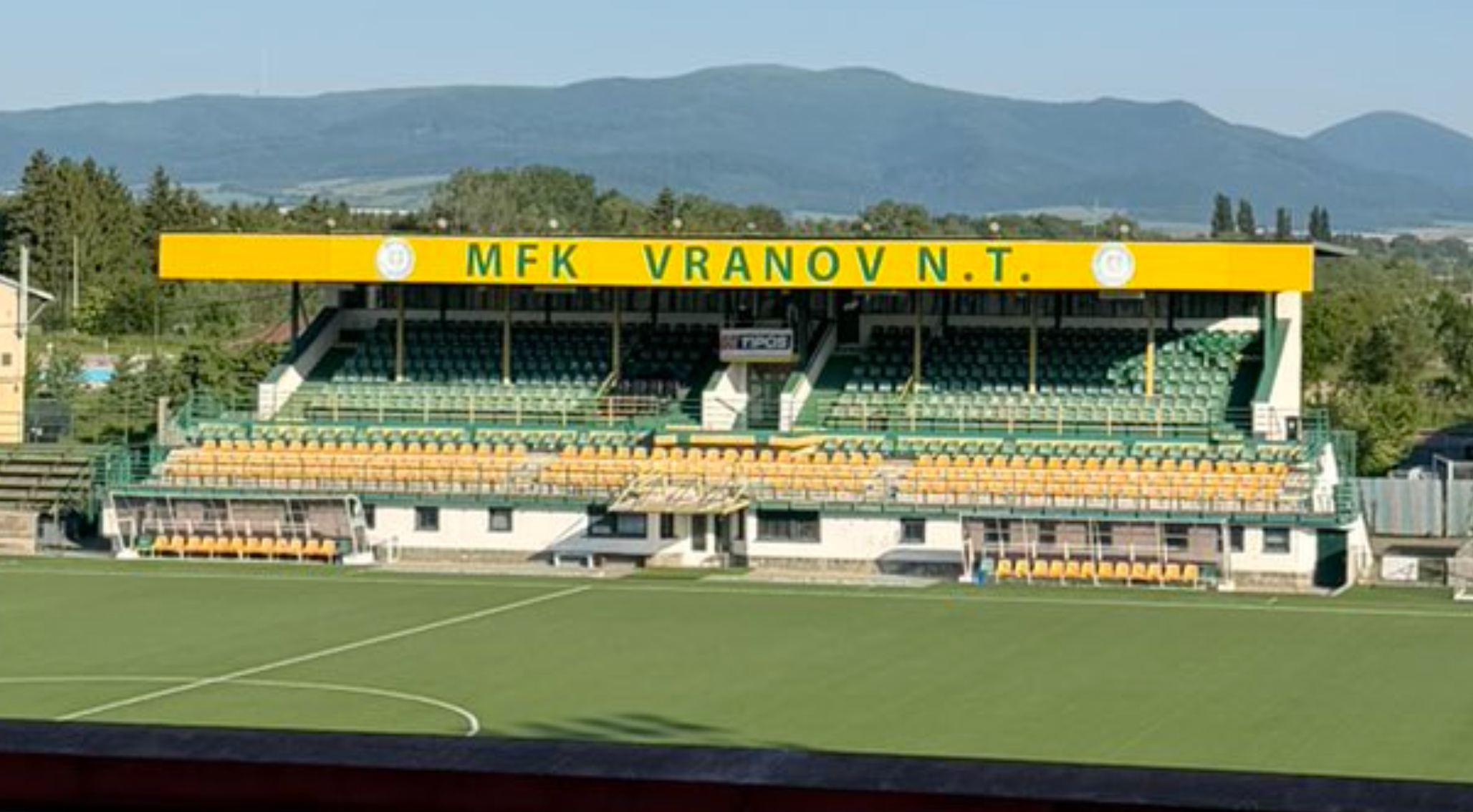
Main stand of the stadium

MFK Vranov plays its home games at the Vranov nad Topľou stadium with a capacity of 5,000 spectators. In 1996, the stadium hosted the Slovak cup between Spartak Trnava and ŠK Futura Humenné, where Humenné would win 2–1.

== Colors and badge ==
The colors of the team are white and green.

== Recent seasons ==
The club's recent seasons:

Year	Division	Position
1993–94	3. liga (III)	7th
1994–95	3. liga	11th
1995–96	3. liga	2nd (promoted)
1996–97	2. SFL (II)	10th
1997–98	2. SFL	13th
1998–99	2. SFL	18th (relegated)
1999–00	3. SFL (III)	10th
2000–01	3. SFL (III)	4th (promoted)
2001–02	2. liga (II)	15th (relegated)
2002–03	3. liga (III)	1st (promoted)
2003–04	2. liga (II)	12th ↓↓
2004–05	3. liga (III)	8th
2005–06	3. liga	5th
2006–07	3. liga	8th
2007–08	3. liga	6th
2008–09	3. liga	5th
2009–10	2. liga (III)	2nd
2010–11	2. liga	11th
2011–12	3. liga	8th
2012–13	3. liga	10th
2013–14	3. liga	15th
2014–15	3. liga	5th
2015–16	3. liga	5th
2016–17	3. liga	6th
2017–18	3. liga	2nd

== Current squad ==
As of 27 July 2023 Note: Flags indicate national team as defined under FIFA eligibility rules; some limited exceptions apply. Players may hold more than one non-FIFA nationality.

No.	Pos.	Nation	Player
3	DF	SVK	Samuel Kuca
4	DF	SVK	Rastislav Marcinko
6	FW	SVK	Dominik Sabol
7	FW	SVK	Matúš Digoň
9	MF	SVK	Lukáš Kulich
11	FW	SVK	Pavol Bellás
12	DF	SVK	Milan Lukáč
16	MF	SVK	Jakub Straka
17	DF	SVK	Marek Babjak (Captain)

No.	Pos.	Nation	Player
18	MF	SVK	Roman Kovalčík
19	DF	SVK	Matúš Štefančík
20	MF	SVK	Juraj Ficko
21	MF	SVK	Dávid Voľanský
22	MF	SVK	Marek Mihok
23	GK	SVK	Denis Barát
24	DF	SVK	Filippo Komloš
—	GK	UKR	Vladyslav Havrylenko
—	MF	UKR	Oleksiy Lazebnyi

=== Current technical staff ===
As of 5 September 2021

Staff	Job title
(Slovakia) Roman Lazúr	Manager
TBA	Assistant manager
TBA	Assistant manager
(Slovakia) Miroslav Kužma	Team Leader
(Slovakia) MuDr. Jana Makoová	Team Doctor
(Slovakia) MuDr. Martin Nemec	Team Doctor
(Slovakia) Ján Novák	Masseur
(Slovakia) Marián Hvozdík	Masseur

== Managers ==
- (Slovakia) Jozef Lehocký (? – September 2012)
- (Slovakia) Jozef Kostelník (24 September 2012 – 31 December 2012)
- (Slovakia) Miroslav Jantek (18 February 2013 – November 2013)
- (Slovakia) Jozef Valkučák (20 January 2014 – April 2014)
- (Slovakia) Miroslav Jantek (May 2014 – June 2014)
- (Slovakia) Bartolomej Petro (July 2014 – February 2017)
- (Slovakia) Emil Sudimák (February 2017 – 15 December 2017)
- (Slovakia) Peter Košuda (27 December 2017 – June 2019)
- (Slovakia) Ondrej Desiatnik (1 July 2019 – June 2020 )

== Shirt sponsor and supplier ==
Kit supplier	Shirt sponsor
(Italy) Sportika	(Slovakia) AK Novikmec
