= ATAK Sportswear =

Slovak sports equipment company

ATAK
- Type: Private
- Industry: Sports equipment, Clothing
- Founded: 1991
- Headquarters: Prešov, Slovakia
- Area served: Worldwide
- Products: Clothing, Sportswear
- Website: www.atak.sk

ATAK is a Slovak sports equipment company (association football, volleyball, basketball, running, handball, lacrosse, ice hockey and tennis) supplier founded in Prešov, Slovakia in 1991.

== Sponsorships ==
The following teams wear uniforms and apparel manufactured by ATAK:

=== Association football ===
- (Slovakia) 1. FC Tatran Prešov

=== Ice Hockey ===
==== National teams ====
- Slovakia

==== Club teams ====
- (Slovakia) HC Slovan Bratislava
- (Slovakia) HC Košice
- (Slovakia) HKm Zvolen

=== Handball ===
- (Slovakia) HT Tatran Prešov
- (Slovakia) HK Slávia Partizánske

=== Volleyball ===
- (Slovakia) VK Slávia EU Bratislava
- (Slovakia) VK Slávia Svidník
- (Slovakia) VK Mirad UNIPO Prešov
- (Slovakia) Volley project Nitra
