= Gejza Šimanský =

Slovak footballer and manager

Personal information
- Date of birth: 29 August 1924
- Place of birth: Sečovce, Czechoslovakia
- Date of death: June 19, 2007 (aged 82)
- Position: Forward

Youth career
- –1946: FK Rapid Vinohrady

Senior career*
Years	Team	Apps	(Gls)
1943–1946	PTS Prešov	?	(21)
1946–1951	Sokol NV Bratislava	?	(48)
1951–1958	DSO Tatran Prešov	?	(23)

International career
1947–1955	Czechoslovakia	15	(7)
- * Club domestic league appearances and goals

Gejza Šimanský (born 29 August 1924 in Sečovce, died 19 June 2007) was a Slovak footballer who played for ŠK Slovan Bratislava and FC Tatran Prešov during the 1940s and 1950s.

== Club career ==
Šimanský made 212 appearances and scored 85 goals in the Czechoslovak First League over 18 seasons.

== International career ==
Šimanský made 15 appearances and scored 7 goals for the full Czechoslovakia national football team from 1947 through 1955.
