= Jozef Karel =

Slovak footballer (1922–2005)

Personal information
- Date of birth: 13 September 1922
- Place of birth: Humenné, Czechoslovakia
- Date of death: 26 September 2005 (aged 83)
- Place of death: Košice, Slovakia
- Position: Midfielder

Senior career*
Years	Team	Apps	(Gls)
- SAC Sečovce
- Snaha Košice
1942	Slávia Prešov		
1943–1948	ŠK Bratislava		
1946–1947	→ CA Paris		
1951–1953	Dukla Prešov		

International career
1944	Slovakia	1	(0)
1946–1948	Czechoslovakia	7	(0)

Managerial career
- 1949–1951: PFK Piešťany
- 1951–1957: Tatran Prešov
- 1957–1961: Jednota Košice
- 1961–1963: Slavoj Trebišov
- 1963–1965: Tatran Prešov
- 1965: MŠK Martin
- 1966–1968: Kuvajt
- 1968–1971: Tatran Prešov
- 1972–1977: Slavoj Trebišov
- 1977–1979: Saprissa
- 1979–1980: ZŤS Košice
- * Club domestic league appearances and goals

Jozef Karel (13 September 1922 in Humenné – 26 September 2005 in Košice) was a Slovak football player and coach. A midfielder, he played for SAC Sečovce, Snaha Košice, Slávia Prešov, ŠK Bratislava and shortly for Red Star Saint-Ouen on a loan. He was selected to the France Football Top 20 Midfielders on the World in 1965.

Karel made one appearance for the First Slovak Republic in 1944 and seven appearances for the Czechoslovakia national team.

He started his managing career in Piešťany where he spent two years and he went on with his work in Prešov, Jednota Košice (he led to the First League), Slavoj Trebišov, Martin, C.D. Saprissa (he won the title) and Kuwait.
