= Pušovce =

- Municipality
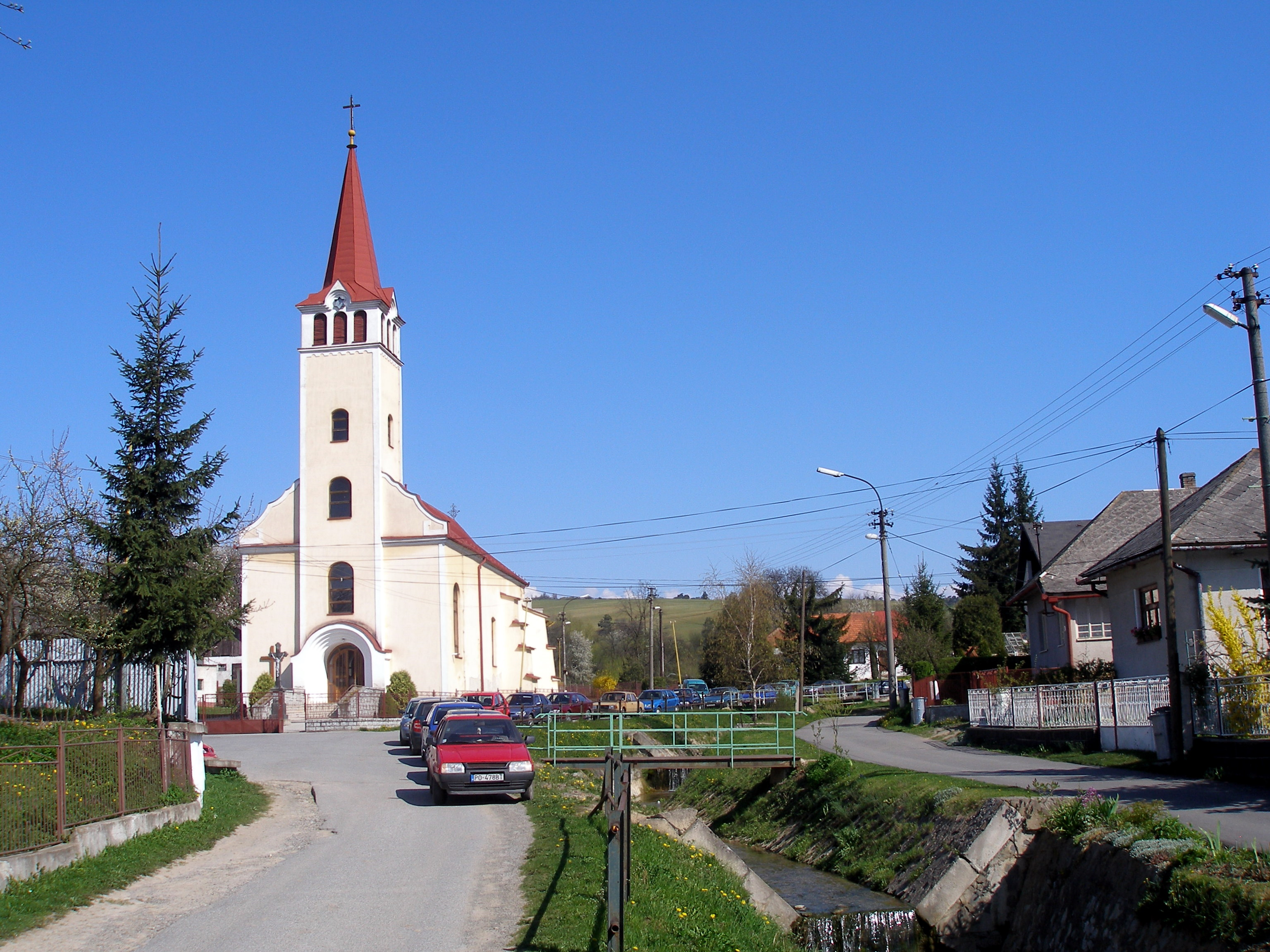

- Flag

- Location of Pušovce in the Prešov Region Location of Pušovce in Slovakia
- Coordinates: 49.08°N 21.42°E
- Country: Slovakia
- Region: Prešov Region
- District: Prešov District
- First mentioned: 1325

Area
  - Total: 4.36 km^{2} (1.68 sq mi)
- Elevation: 371 m (1,217 ft)

Population (2025)
  - Total: 567
- Time zone: UTC+1 (CET)
  - Summer (DST): UTC+2 (CEST)
- Postal code: 821 4
- Area code: +421 51
- Vehicle registration plate (until 2022): PO
- Website: www.obecpusovce.sk

Pušovce (Rusyn: Пушовце, Hungarian: Pósfalva) is a village and municipality in Prešov District in the Prešov Region of eastern Slovakia.

== Name ==
The name comes from a personal name Puš – a founder of the settlement and owner of the property.

== History ==
In historical records the village was first mentioned in 1352.

== Geography ==
The municipality lies at an altitude of 371 metres (1,217 ft) and covers an area of 4.36 km^{2} (1.68 sq mi) (2025).

== Population ==
Population statistic (10 years)
| Year | 1995 | 2005 | 2015 | 2025 |
|---|---|---|---|---|
| Count | 528 | 549 | 526 | 567 |
| Difference | | +3.97% | −4.18% | +7.79% |

Population statistic
| Year | 2024 | 2025 |
|---|---|---|
| Count | 563 | 567 |
| Difference | | +0.71% |

It has a population of 567 people (31 December 2025).

=== Ethnicity ===
Census 2021 (1+ %)
| Ethnicity | Number | Fraction |
|---|---|---|
| Slovak | 514 | 99.41% |
| Not found out | 7 | 1.35% |
| Total | 517 | |

In year 2021 was 517 people by ethnicity 514 as Slovak, 7 as Not found out, 1 as Serbian, 1 as Romani and 1 as Rusyn.

Note on population: The difference values of population numbers in the table "Population statistic" and in the sections "Ethnicity" & "Religion" is caused by the use of various statistical methods.

=== Religion ===
Census 2021 (1+ %)
| Religion | Number | Fraction |
|---|---|---|
| Roman Catholic Church | 458 | 88.59% |
| Evangelical Church | 45 | 8.7% |
| None | 6 | 1.16% |
| Total | 517 | |

In year 2021 was 517 people by religion 458 from Roman Catholic Church, 45 from Evangelical Church, 6 from None, 4 from Greek Catholic Church, 2 from Not found out, 1 from Eastern Orthodox Church and 1 from Apostolic Church.
