= Marek Petruš =

Slovak footballer and manager

Personal information
- Full name: Marek Petruš
- Date of birth: 5 October 1975 (age 51)
- Place of birth: Prešov, Czechoslovakia
- Position: Centre-back

Senior career*
Years	Team	Apps	(Gls)
–1997	Tatran Prešov		
1997–1998	Bnei Yehuda		
1998	Kardemir Karabükspor		
1998–2001	Tatran Prešov		
2001–2002	Slovan Bratislava		
2003–2004	Gazovik-Gazprom Izhevsk		
2004–2012	Slovan Nižná Šebastová		
2006	→ BSC Bardejov (loan)		
2006–2010	→ Spišská Nová Ves (loan)		
2012	→ Pivovar Veľký Šariš (loan)		

Managerial career
- 2015–2018: Tatran Prešov U19
- 2017–2018: Slovakia U19 (assistant)
- 2018–2019: Poprad
- 2021–2022: Liptovský Mikuláš
- 2022–2023: Tatran Prešov
- 2023: Michalovce
- 2023–2025: Tatran Prešov
- 2025-: Liptovský Mikuláš
- * Club domestic league appearances and goals

Marek Petruš (born 5 October 1975) is Slovak professional football manager and former player and manager of Liptovský Mikuláš He has also played in Israel and Russia.

== Honours ==
=== As coach ===
Tatran Liptovský Mikuláš

- 2. Liga: 2020–21
