= Theodor Reimann =

Slovak footballer (1921–1982)

Personal information
- Date of birth: 10 February 1921
- Place of birth: Zvolen, Czechoslovakia
- Date of death: 30 August 1982 (aged 61)
- Place of death: Bratislava, Czechoslovakia
- Height: 1.70 m (5 ft 7 in)
- Position: Goalkeeper

Senior career*
Years	Team	Apps	(Gls)
–1937	ZTK Zvolen		
1937–1938	FTC Fiľakovo		
1939–1942	AC Považská Bystrica		
1942	AC Svit Batizovce		
1942–1943	OAP Bratislava		
1944	FK Svit		
1945–1954	Sokol NV Bratislava		
1955	Tatran Prešov		
1956	Iskra Žilina		

International career
1939–1943	Slovakia	14	(0)
1948–1954	Czechoslovakia	5	(0)

Managerial career
- 1967–1968: Tatran Prešov
- 1970–1973: MŠK Žilina
- 1973–1974: Lokomotíva Košice
- 1975–1976: FC Nitra
- 1976–1978: Jednota Trenčín
- * Club domestic league appearances and goals

Theodor Reimann (10 February 1921 – 30 August 1982), also known as Teodor Reimann, was a football goalkeeper and manager. At club level he played mostly for Slovan Bratislava. Internationally he played for both Slovakia and Czechoslovakia. He obtained 14 caps for Slovakia from 1939 to 1943. He obtained five caps between 1948 and 1954 for Czechoslovakia including one at the 1954 FIFA World Cup.

== Club career ==
Reimann played for AC Považská Bystrica during wartime. He played for Slovan Bratislava for the majority of his career, winning three consecutive league titles with the club in 1949, 1950 and 1951. In the early 1950s Reimann set a record of not conceding a goal in the Czechoslovak First League for 769 minutes, a record that he held until Sparta Prague goalkeeper Petr Čech surpassed this mark in November 2001. In 1955 Reimann played for Tatran Prešov in a player-coach capacity, under which terms he continued at Iskra Žilina in 1956.

== International career ==
Reimann represented two national teams; due to the separation of Czechoslovakia during World War II he was able to play for Slovakia between 1939 and 1943. He played fourteen times for Slovakia. After the war, the Slovakia team ceased to play matches and Reimann began to play for Czechoslovakia. Although he only made five appearances for Czechoslovakia, he did play in the 1954 FIFA World Cup, keeping goal in Czechoslovakia's 2–0 defeat against reigning World Cup champions Uruguay.

== Coaching career ==
Reimann coached MŠK Žilina, Lokomotíva Košice, FC Nitra, and Jednota Trenčín.

== Honours ==
Slovan Bratislava

- Czechoslovak First League: 1949, 1950, 1951
