= Michal Šmarda (footballer) =

Czech footballer and coach

Personal information
- Date of birth: 31 January 1971 (age 55)
- Place of birth: Czechoslovakia
- Height: 1.73 m (5 ft 8 in)
- Position: Midfielder

Team information
- Current team: Žilina (assistant)

Youth career
- Hradec Králové

Senior career*
Years	Team	Apps	(Gls)
1990–1996	Hradec Králové	82	(5)
1996–1998	Sigma Olomouc	56	(2)
1998–2000	Sparta Prague	13	(3)
1999–2000	→ Chmel Blšany (loan)	19	(2)
2000–2002	Viktoria Žižkov	71	(5)
2003–2007	Hradec Králové	16	(0)
2007–2008	Bohemians 1905	27	(0)

Managerial career
- 2008–2012: Hradec Králové (assistant)
- 2012–2013: Jablonec (assistant)
- 2013–2016: Zbrojovka Brno (assistant)
- 2017–2018: Hradec Králové (assistant)
- 2018: Vysočina Jihlava (assistant)
- 2018–2020: Slovácko (assistant)
- 2020–2021: Sparta Prague (assistant)
- 2021–2022: Prostějov (assistant)
- 2022–2023: Viktoria Žižkov
- 2023: Prostějov
- 2024–2025: Baník Ostrava (assistant)
- 2026: Dukla Prague (assistant)
- 2026–: Žilina (assistant)
- * Club domestic league appearances and goals

Michal Šmarda (born 31 January 1971) is a Czech former professional footballer who is currently the assistant coach of Žilina. A midfielder, Šmarda played in the Czech First League on over 300 occasions, winning the competition with Sparta Prague in 1999.

== Playing career ==
He played in the Czech First League, making over 300 appearances for clubs including SK Hradec Králové, FK Viktoria Žižkov and SK Sigma Olomouc. He won the 1998–99 Czech First League with Sparta Prague. Šmarda played the final match of his professional career in May 2008 and subsequently moved into coaching.

== Coaching career ==
Šmarda became a coach at Hradec in the Czech 2. Liga in 2008 immediately after ending his playing career. Due to injury problems in the first-team squad, Šmarda played the full 90 minutes in a friendly match for Hradec Králové in February 2012 against FC Astra Ploieşti. In May 2012, Šmarda followed Hradec Králové manager Václav Kotal to FK Baumit Jablonec, becoming assistant manager there. In September 2013, Šmarda joined Zbrojovka Brno alongside Kotal. The duo left the club in June 2016.

In July 2017, Šmarda returned to Hradec as an assistant coach. Šmarda then moved to Vysočina Jihlava on 2 January 2018 under manager Martin Svědík. In November 2018, Svědík was fired and Šmarda took charge of the team on interim basis until 6 December 2018. Later in the same month, Šmarda joined Slovácko once again under Svědík.

In February 2020, he was reunited with Václav Kotal at Sparta Prague. The duo left the club one year later, in February 2021.

In April 2023 Šmarda was announced as the new manager of Prostějov.

== Honours ==
=== Club ===
Sparta Prague

- Czech First League: 1998–99
