= Mikuláš Komanický =

Slovak footballer (born 1951)

Personal information
- Date of birth: 31 July 1951 (age 75)
- Place of birth: Bardejov, Czechoslovakia
- Positions: Forward; defender

Senior career*
Years	Team	Apps	(Gls)
?–1971	Partizán Bardejov		
1971–1981	Tatran Prešov		

International career
1971	Czechoslovakia	1	(0)

Managerial career
- 1991–1992: Tatran Prešov
- 1992–1993: Magnezit Jelšava
- 1993–1995: Slavoj Trebišov
- 1995–1996: Magnezit Jelšava
- 1996–1997: Nitra
- 1997–1998: JAS Bardejov
- 1998–2001: Tatran Prešov
- 2001–2002: SCP Ružomberok
- 2002–2003: Slovakia U21
- 2004–2005: Tatran Prešov
- 2005: ENTHOI Lakatamia
- 2005–2007: Rimavská Sobota
- 2008–2009: Zemplín Michalovce
- 2009–2010: Odeva Lipany
- 2011–2012: Partizán Bardejov
- * Club domestic league appearances and goals

Mikuláš Komanický (born 31 July 1951) is a former football player and manager from Slovakia.
