= MŠK Žilina =

Slovak football club

Žilina
- Full name: MŠK Žilina a.s.
- Nicknames: Šošoni (The Shoshone); Žlto-Zelení (The Yellow-Greens)
- Founded: 20 June 1908; 118 years ago as Zsolnai Testgyakorlók Köre
- Ground: Štadión pod Dubňom
- Capacity: 10,280
- Owner: Jozef Antošík
- President: Jozef Antošík
- Head coach: Vladimír Veselý
- League: Slovak First Football League
- 2025–26: 4th
- Website: www.mskzilina.sk
Home colours	Away colours	Third colours

MŠK Žilina (Slovak pronunciation: [ˈem ˈeʂ ˈkaː ˈʐilina]) is a Slovak football club based in the town of Žilina, that is playing in the Slovak First Football League. Since the league inception in 1993, the club has won 7 titles and comes second in All-time table that makes them one of the most successful teams in the competition. The club and their supporters alike are nicknamed Šošoni (after the Shoshone Native American tribe) and play their home games in the Štadión pod Dubňom. Žilina won their most recent title in 2016–17 season.

== History ==
=== Early years ===
The club was founded towards the end of 1908 under the Hungarian name Zsolnai Testgyakorlók Köre, and was officially registered on 20 June 1909. The club won its first Slovak championship (Zväzové majstrovstvá Slovenska) in 1928 followed by another in 1929.

=== Czechoslovak League ===
In total, Žilina played 30 out of 47 seasons in the Czechoslovak First League spanning from 1945 to 1993 and come 13th in all-time table. Their most successful was 1946–47 season, when they clinched 4th place.

Many consider 1961 a milestone in club's history. Firstly, the team reached the final of the National Cup, where they lost to Dukla Prague, the eventual Czechoslovak champion. Despite the defeat, for the first time in its history the club, then known as Dynamo Žilina, broke into Europe to contest in the UEFA Cup Winners' Cup. Notable 3–2 and 1–0 victories over Olympiacos moved them in quarter-finals, however the ambitious Slovak team was ultimately knocked out by the previous year's winner Fiorentina. Although Žilina grabbed a promising 3–2 victory at home, Fiorentina went through by winning the second leg 2–0.

Quarter-Finals

==== First leg ====
21 February 1962

Dynamo Žilina (Czechoslovakia)	3–2	(Italy) Fiorentina
Jakubčík 11', 63'; Majerník 42'	Report	Milani 47'; Dell'Angelo 85'

Žilina

==== Second leg ====
27 February 1962

Fiorentina (Italy)	2–0	(Czechoslovakia) Dynamo Žilina
Ferretti 38'; Hamrin 40'	Report

Florence

Fiorentina won 4–3 on aggregate.

In the late 1960s the club was renamed TJ ZVL Žilina and participated in the Intertoto Cup for several years, winning the group in 1969 and coming 2nd a year later. In 1973–74 they reached the final of the Mitropa Cup but they were defeated by Tatabányai Bányász 5–2 on aggregate. Between 1972 and 1974, they finished 5th in the First Division of the Czechoslovak League for three years running, followed by relegation to the Second Division in the 1978–79 season. The club bounced back four years later and finished second in the Mitropa Cup.

=== New era – Slovak League ===
Following dissolution of Czechoslovakia in 1993, MŠK Žilina has been playing in the Slovak First Football League for the total of 23 seasons with the exception of 1995–96 season after relegation to the Second Division.

In the autumn of 2000, former Czechoslovak defender Ladislav Jurkemik joined the club as a new manager. After his departure halfway through the 2001–02 season the club appointed Czech coach Leoš Kalvoda. During his short reign at the club he led them to win their first title. In the 2002–03 season, now under the management of Milan Lešický, the club succeeded in retaining the title.

Ladislav Jurkemik was reappointed as a manager during the 2003–04 season. He led the defending champions to 10 priceless consecutive victories to clinch the third successive title though narrowly on a goal difference. After Slovan Bratislava, MŠK Žilina became only the second club to win three Slovak titles.

The team's performances in next two seasons faded while they lacked the quality they had been famous for during their winning campaigns. In pursuit of silverware numerous players were signed over next two years. In the span of only fourteen months, three managers; the reputable Karol Pecze, his successor Milan Nemec and eventually Marijan Vlak were in charge over the team. Since the results and performances never met the expectations, Vlak ended his reign immediately at the end of 2005–06 season after they failed to reach UEFA Cup spot only to finish fourth.

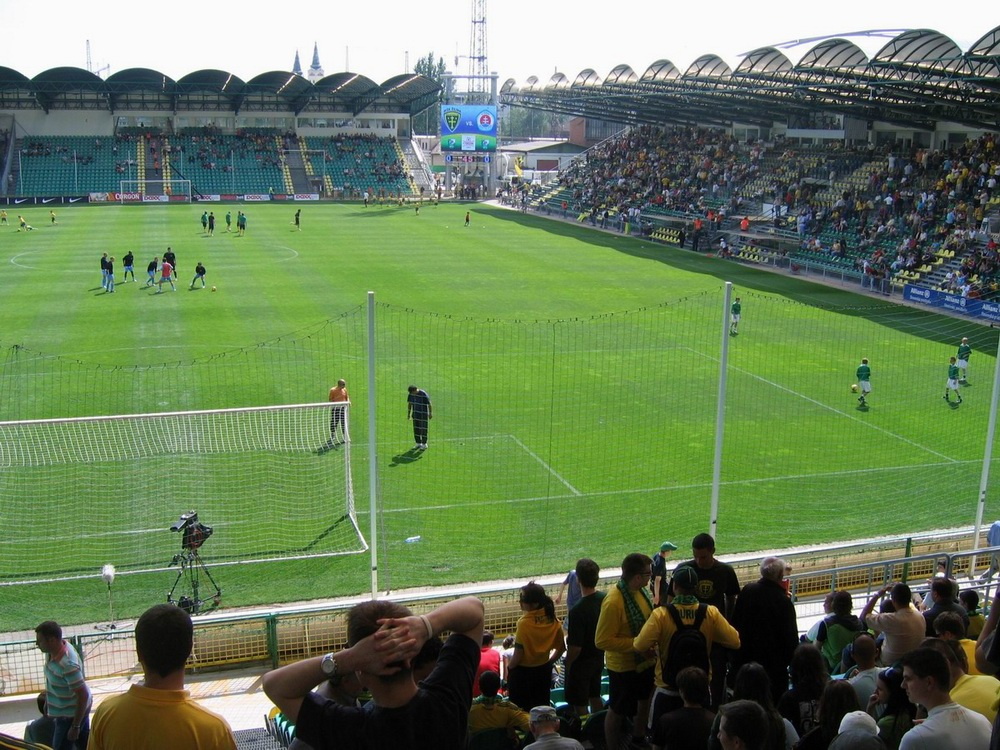
MŠK Žilina take on ŠK Slovan Bratislava in May 2009

They played in the 2008–09 UEFA Cup, reaching the group stages where they beat Aston Villa 2–1 at Villa Park.

Former Czechoslovakia and later Czech international Pavel Hapal was appointed new manager before 2009–10 campaign. In his first season, he led the team to win a league title, their fifth in nine years. Arguably the greatest success in their history came by making a debut in 2010–11 UEFA Champions League group stage after eliminating Sparta Prague in play-off round. In the following season they completed their first ever double, while the 2012–13 season saw the team finishing 7th – their worst league position since 2000. However, as a defeated finalists of the Slovak Cup the club secured a place to contest in the 1st qualifying round of 2013–14 UEFA Europa League.

== League finishing positions ==
=== Events timeline ===
- 1909 – Founded as Zsolnai Testgyakorlók Köre
- 1910 – Renamed ZsTS Zsolna
- 1919 – Renamed SK Žilina
- 1948 – Renamed Sokol Slovena Žilina
- 1953 – Renamed Jiskra Slovena Žilina
- 1956 – Renamed DSO Dynamo Žilina
- 1961 – First European qualification, 1961–62
- 1963 – Renamed Jednota Žilina
- 1967 – Renamed TJ ZVL Žilina
- 1990 – Renamed ŠK Žilina
- 1995 – Renamed MŠK Žilina

== Affiliated clubs ==
The following clubs are currently affiliated with MŠK Žilina:

- (Slovakia) Tatran Liptovský Mikuláš (2012–present)
- (Slovakia) MŠK Námestovo (TBA–present)
- (Slovakia) Baník Prievidza (2013–present)
- (Slovakia) JUPIE Futbalová škola Mareka Hamšíka (2016–present)
- (Ghana) MŠK Žilina Africa FC (2018–present)

== Supporters ==
MŠK Žilina supporters are called Žilinskí Šošoni (Žilina Shoshones), North Brigade and Žilinskí Fanatici (Žilina Fanatics). Žilina supporters maintain friendly relations with fans of Polish Góral Żywiec.

== Stadium ==
Štadión Pod Dubňom

Štadión Pod Dubňom is their home stadium. It has a capacity of 10,280. It underwent a major renovation between 2006 and September 2009. Between 2014 and 2015 it was used as the home stadium of Slovakia.

== Sponsorship ==
Period	Kit manufacturer	Shirt sponsor
1993–94	Kappa	MIRUPO
1994–95	Hummel	K&K
1995–96	Adidas	none
1996–97	ATAK Sportswear	none
1997–98	Mizuno	none
1998–99	Joma	none
1999–01	NIKE	none
2001–04	NIKE	Tento
2004–07	Adidas	Tento
2007–2025	NIKE	PRETO
2026-	NIKE	RADOMA

== Honours ==
=== Domestic ===
Czechoslovakia

- Zväzové Majstrovstvá Slovenska (Slovak League) (1925–33)
  - Winners (2): 1927–28, 1928–29
- Czechoslovak Cup (1961–93)
  - Runners-up (1): 1961–62
- 1.SNL (1st Slovak National football league)
  - Winners (1): 1981–82

Slovakia

- Slovak First Football League (1993–present)
  - Winners (7): 2001–02, 2002–03, 2003–04, 2006–07, 2009–10, 2011–12, 2016–17
  - Runners-up (6): 2004–05, 2007–08, 2008–09, 2014–15, 2019–20, 2024–25
  - 3rd place (1): 2010–11
- Slovak Cup
  - Winners (2): 2011–12, 2025–26
  - Runners-up (4): 2010–11, 2012–13, 2018–19, 2020–21
- Pribina Cup (Slovak Super Cup)
  - Winners (4): 2003–04, 2004–05, 2007–08, 2010–11

=== European ===
- UEFA Cup Winners' Cup
  - Quarter-final (1): 1961–62
- Mitropa Cup
  - Runners-up (2): 1974, 1983
- UEFA Champions League
  - Group stage (1): 2010-11
- UEFA Europa League
  - Group stage (1): 2008–09

== Transfers ==
MŠK have produced numerous players who have gone on to represent the Slovak national football team. Over the last period there has been a steady increase of young players leaving Žilina after a few years of first team football and moving on to play football in leagues of a higher standard, with the German Bundesliga (Double best scorer Marek Mintál to 1. FC Nürnberg in 2003, another forwards Stanislav Šesták to VfL Bochum in 2009 and Mário Breška to 1. FC Nürnberg in 2008, also right back Peter Pekarík to VfL Wolfsburg in 2009), Italian Serie A (Milan Škriniar to Sampdoria in 2016, Dávid Hancko to ACF Fiorentina in 2018), Spanish La Liga (Róbert Mazáň to Celta de Vigo in 2018), Turkish Süper Lig (William to Kayserispor in 2016), Dutch Eredivisie (Róbert Boženík to Feyenoord in 2020), Danish Superliga (Denis Vavro to F.C. Copenhagen in 2017, Dawid Kurminowski to AGK in 2021), Austrian Football Bundesliga (Admir Vladavić to Salzburg in 2009 and 2013–14 best goalscorer Matej Jelić to Rapid Wien in 2015), Polish Ekstraklasa (Ján Mucha to Legia Warsaw in 2005, Róbert Jež to Górnik Zabrze in 2010 and Vahan Bichakhchyan to Pogoń Szczecin in 2022). Russian Premier League (Tomáš Hubočan to Zenit in 2008). The top transfer was agreed in 2016 when 18 years old talented midfielder László Bénes joined German Mönchengladbach for a fee more than €5.0 million, which was the highest ever paid to a Slovak club.

=== Record transfers ===
Rank	Player	To	Fee	Year
1.	(Slovakia) László Bénes	(Germany) Mönchengladbach	€5.5 million*	2016
2.	(Slovakia) Róbert Boženík	(Netherlands) Feyenoord	€4.6 million*	2020
3.	(Slovakia) Dávid Hancko	(Italy) ACF Fiorentina	€4.5 million*	2018
4.	(Slovakia) Tomáš Hubočan	(Russia) Zenit	€3.8 million	2008
5.	(Slovakia) Tobiáš Pališčák	(Czech Republic) Viktoria Plzeň	€3.0 million	2026
6.	(Poland) Jakub Kiwior	(Italy) Spezia	€2.0 million*	2021
6.	(Slovakia) Mário Sauer	(France) Toulouse FC	€2.0 million*	2025
6.	(Slovakia) Adrián Kaprálik	(Germany) Holstein Kiel	€2.0 million*	2025
7.	(Ghana) Samuel Gidi	(United States) FC Cincinnati	€1.7 million*	2025
8.	(Slovakia) Nikolas Špalek	(Italy) Brescia	€1.5 million	2018
8.	(Slovakia) Denis Vavro	(Denmark) FC Copenhagen	€1.5 million*	2017
8.	(Slovakia) Samuel Mráz	(Italy) Empoli F.C.	€1.5 million	2018
8.	(Slovakia) Ľubomír Belko	(Norway) Viking FK	€1.5 million	2026
9.	(Slovakia) Róbert Mazáň	(Spain) Celta de Vigo	€1.2 million*	2018
9.	(Slovakia) Milan Škriniar	(Italy) Sampdoria	€1.2 million*	2016
10.	(Slovakia) Peter Pekarík	(Germany) VfL Wolfsburg	€1.0 million*	2009
10.	(Slovakia) Peter Štyvar	(England) Bristol City F.C.	€1.0 million*	2009
10.	(Poland) Dawid Kurminowski	(Denmark) Aarhus GF	€1.0 million*	2021
10.	(Slovakia) Timotej Jambor	(Romania) FC Rapid București	€1.0 million	2024
10.	(Slovakia) Ján Bernát	(Belgium) Westerlo	€1.0 million	2022

*-unofficial fee

== Players ==
=== Current squad ===
As of 6 September 2026

Note: Flags indicate national team as defined under FIFA eligibility rules; some limited exceptions apply. Players may hold more than one non-FIFA nationality.

No.	Pos.	Nation	Player
1	GK	SVK	Jakub Badžgoň
2	DF	SVK	Marek Okál
4	DF	SVK	Matúš Pavlík
6	MF	CMR	Xavier Adang
7	FW	SVK	František Kóša
9	FW	SVK	Patrik Baleja
10	MF	ROU	Andrei Florea
11	MF	POL	Fabian Bzdyl
14	DF	SVK	Michal Svoboda
16	FW	SVK	Patrik Iľko
17	DF	SVK	Ján Minárik
19	DF	CIV	Marcus Arnold Traoré
20	DF	SVK	Krisztián Bari
21	DF	SVK	Timotej Hranica

No.	Pos.	Nation	Player
23	FW	SVK	Michal Faško
24	FW	SVK	Samuel Ďatko
25	DF	SWE	Johan Albin
26	GK	SVK	Tamás Tarcsi
28	DF	GEO	Aleksandre Narimanidze
31	GK	SVK	Dávid Šípoš
39	FW	CZE	Lukáš Juliš
66	MF	SVK	Miroslav Káčer (captain)
77	MF	SVK	Róbert Petruška
90	FW	ESP	Dani Homet
95	FW	CRO	Marko Roginić
99	FW	SWE	Kenan Bilalović (on loan from (Scotland) Aberdeen)
—	DF	CZE	Filip Kaša

For recent transfers, see List of Slovak football transfers summer 2026.

=== Out on loan ===
Note: Flags indicate national team as defined under FIFA eligibility rules; some limited exceptions apply. Players may hold more than one non-FIFA nationality.

No. / Pos. / Nation / Player; 27 / FW / NGR / Ridwan Sanusi (at Trenčín until 30 June 2027)	No. / Pos. / Nation / Player; 34 / FW / SVK / Lukáš Prokop (at Inter Turku until 31 December 2026)

== Staff ==
Position	Staff
Head coach	(Slovakia) Vladimír Veselý
Assistant coach	(Poland) Adrian Olecki
Assistant coach	(Slovakia) Michal Šmarda
Goalkeeping coach	(Slovakia) Miloš Volešák
Video analyst	(Slovakia) Martin Praženica
Team manager	(Slovakia) Vladimír Leitner
Conditioning & rehabilitation coach	(Slovakia) Milan Ťapay
Doctor	(Slovakia) Jaroslav Hanulák
Doctor	(Slovakia) Jozef Hudcovský
Doctor	(Slovakia) Juraj Popluhár
Doctor	(Slovakia) Karol Šafek
Physiotherapist	(Slovakia) Peter Lutišan
Physiotherapist	(Slovakia) Vladimír Perexta
Masseur	(Slovakia) Marko Kopas
Masseur	(Slovakia) Pavol Melicherík
Masseur	(Slovakia) Jakub Niník
Video technician	(Slovakia) Juraj Jacko
Sporting director	(Slovakia) Karol Belaník

== Results ==
=== League and Cup history ===
Slovak League only (1993–present)

Season	Division (Name)	Pos./Teams	Pl.	W	D	L	GS	GA	P	Slovak Cup	Europe		Top Scorer (Goals)
1993–94	1st (Mars Superliga)	5/(12)	32	11	11	10	50	42	33	3.R			(Slovakia) Ivan Šefčík (13) (Slovakia) Ľubomír Zuziak (13)
1994–95	1st(Mars Superliga)	12/(12)	32	9	3	20	37	53	30	1.R			
1995–96	2nd (1.Liga)	2/(16) (P)	30	17	5	8	57	27	56	2.R			
1996–97	1st (Mars Superliga)	9/(16)	30	11	4	15	30	34	37	2.R			
1997–98	1st (Mars Superliga)	7/(16)	30	11	9	10	23	25	42	1.R	UI	Group stage (9), 4th	(Slovakia) Ladislav Meszároš (5)
1998–99	1st (Mars Superliga)	6/(16)	30	15	3	12	36	42	48	2.R			(Slovakia) Marek Mintál (11)
1999–00	1st (Mars Superliga)	8/(16)	30	12	5	13	39	37	41	1.R	UI	2.R ( (France) Metz)	(Slovakia) Marek Mintál (12)
2000–01	1st (Mars Superliga)	5/(10)	36	11	12	13	41	46	45	2.R			(Slovakia) Ľubomír Reiter (12)
2001–02	1st (Mars Superliga)	1/(10)	36	21	6	9	62	39	69	Semi-finals			(Slovakia) Marek Mintál (21)
2002–03	1st (Slovak Super Liga)	1/(10)	36	21	7	8	69	31	70	Semi-finals	CL	Q2 ( (Switzerland) Basel)	(Slovakia) Marek Mintál (20)
2003–04	1st (Corgoň Liga)	1/(10)	36	17	13	6	62	35	64	Quarter-finals	CL; UC	Q3 ( (England) Chelsea); 1R ( (Netherlands) FC Utrecht)	(Slovakia) Marek Bažík (11)
2004–05	1st (Corgoň Liga)	2/(10)	36	19	8	9	73	34	65	Semi-finals	CL	Q2 ( (Romania) D.București)	(Slovakia) Ivan Bartoš (18)
2005–06	1st (Corgoň Liga)	4/(10)	36	18	6	12	69	44	60	2.R	UC	Q2 ( Austria Wien)	(Slovakia) Stanislav Šesták (17)
2006–07	1st (Corgoň Liga)	1/(12)	28	22	3	3	80	17	69	Quarter-finals			(Slovakia) Stanislav Šesták (15)
2007–08	1st (Corgoň Liga)	2/(12)	33	22	4	4	75	30	73	Semi-finals	CL	Q2 ( (Czech Republic) Slavia Prague)	(Slovakia) Peter Štyvar (15)
2008–09	1st (Corgoň Liga)	2/(12)	33	18	8	7	56	26	62	Quarter-finals	UC	Group stage (F), 4th	(Brazil) Adauto (11)
2009–10	1st (Corgoň Liga)	1/(12)	33	23	4	6	59	17	73	3.R	EL	P-O ( (Serbia) FK Partizan)	(Slovakia) Ivan Lietava (13)
2010–11	1st (Corgoň Liga)	3/(12)	33	14	12	7	47	28	54	Runners-up	CL	Group stage (F), 4th	(Slovakia) Tomáš Majtán (11) (Slovakia) Tomáš Oravec (11)
2011–12	1st (Corgoň Liga)	1/(12)	33	19	10	4	57	27	67	Winner	EL	Q2 ( (Iceland) KR)	(Slovakia) Róbert Pich (10)
2012–13	1st (Corgoň Liga)	7/(12)	33	9	15	9	37	28	42	Runners-up	CL	Q2 ( (Israel) I.K.Shmona)	(Slovakia) Róbert Pich (11)
2013–14	1st (Corgoň Liga)	9/(12)	33	11	7	15	49	50	40	Quarter-finals	EL	Q3 ( (Croatia) HNK Rijeka)	(Slovakia) Róbert Pich (7)
2014–15	1st (Fortuna Liga)	2/(12)	33	20	9	4	68	25	69	5.R			(Croatia) Matej Jelić (19)
2015–16	1st (Fortuna Liga)	5/(12)	33	14	6	13	58	46	48	Semi-finals	EL	P-O ( (Spain) Athletic Bilbao)	(Bosnia and Herzegovina) Nermin Haskić (8)
2016–17	1st (Fortuna Liga)	1/(12)	30	23	4	3	82	25	73	Quarter-finals			(Slovakia) Filip Hlohovský (20)
2017–18	1st (Fortuna Liga)	4/(12)	31	17	2	12	61	48	53	Semi–finals	CL	Q2 ( (Denmark) Copenhagen)	(Slovakia) Samuel Mráz (21)
2018–19	1st (Fortuna Liga)	4/(12)	32	16	6	10	56	44	54	Runners-up			(Slovakia) Róbert Boženík (13)
2019–20	1st (Fortuna Liga)	2/(12)	27	15	6	6	48	25	51	1/8 Fin			(Slovakia) Ján Bernát (9)
2020–21	1st (Fortuna Liga)	4/(12)	32	15	7	10	73	52	52	Runners-up	EL	Q1 ( (Wales) New Saints)	(Poland) Dawid Kurminowski (20)
2021–22	1st (Fortuna Liga)	6/(12)	32	8	10	14	43	52	34	Quarter-finals	ECL	P–O ( (Czech Republic) FK Jablonec)	(Armenia) Vahan Bichakhchyan (6)
2022–23	1st (Fortuna Liga)	6/(12)	32	11	6	15	49	53	39	Fourth round			(Slovakia) Adrián Kaprálik (10)
2023–24	1st (Niké Liga)	4/(12)	32	16	7	9	54	45	47	Third round	ECL	Q2 ( (Belgium) K.A.A. Gent)	(Slovakia) Dávid Ďuriš (9)
2024–25	1st (Niké Liga)	2/(12)	32	15	9	8	55	40	54	Quarter-finals			(Slovakia) Dávid Ďuriš (10)
2025–26	1st (Niké Liga)	4/(12)	32	15	7	10	59	41	52	Winner	ECL	Q2 ( (Poland) Raków)	(Slovakia) Michal Faško (14)

=== European record ===
As of match played 30 July 2026

Competition	Pld	W	D	L	GF	GA	GD
UEFA Champions League	28	9	5	14	27	45	−18
Europa League / UEFA Cup	39	18	8	13	57	50	+7
Cup Winners' Cup	4	3	0	1	7	6	+1
UEFA Conference League	16	7	1	8	29	36	-7
UEFA Intertoto Cup	8	4	1	3	9	12	−3
UEFA	95	41	15	39	129	149	–20
Intertoto Cup	24	10	7	7	42	34	+8
Mitropa Cup	12	5	2	5	25	18	+7
Non-UEFA	36	15	9	12	67	52	+15
Total	131	56	24	51	196	201	-5

Season	Competition	Round	Country	Club	Home	Away	Aggregate
1961–62	UEFA Cup Winners' Cup	1. Round	(Greece)	Olympiacos	1–0	3–2	4–2
1961–62	UEFA Cup Winners' Cup	Quarter-finals	(Italy)	Fiorentina	3–2	0–2	3–4
1967	Intertoto Cup	Group B8	(Germany)	Fortuna Düsseldorf	0–2	0–1	
1967	Intertoto Cup	Group B8	(Austria)	LASK Linz	0–0	1–1	
1967	Intertoto Cup	Group B8	(Denmark)	Vejle BK	1–1	1–2	
1969	Intertoto Cup	Group 4	(Sweden)	Örebro SK	4–1	0–3	
1969	Intertoto Cup	Group 4	(Netherlands)	NEC	2–1	1–1	
1969	Intertoto Cup	Group 4	(Switzerland)	AC Bellinzona	3–0	2–1	
1970	Intertoto Cup	Group A4	(Netherlands)	MVV Maastricht	3–3	3–4	
1970	Intertoto Cup	Group A4	(Sweden)	Örebro SK	4–0	0–1	
1970	Intertoto Cup	Group A4	(Belgium)	KSV Waregem	3–1	3–0	
1972	Intertoto Cup	Group 6	(Germany)	Eintracht Braunschweig	1–1	0–5	
1972	Intertoto Cup	Group 6	(Sweden)	Landskrona BoIS	1–0	2–2	
1972	Intertoto Cup	Group 6	(Denmark)	Vejle BK	3–1	4–2	
1974	Mitropa Cup	Group B	(Socialist Federal Republic of Yugoslavia)	FK Sarajevo	4–0	3–3	
1974	Mitropa Cup	Group B	(Hungary)	Videoton	5–1	1–3	
1974	Mitropa Cup	Final	(Hungary)	Tatabányai Bányász	2–3	0–2	2–5
1983	Mitropa Cup	Group	(Italy)	Hellas Verona	4–0	1–1	
1983	Mitropa Cup	Group	(Hungary)	Vasas	3–1	0–2	
1983	Mitropa Cup	Group	(Socialist Federal Republic of Yugoslavia)	Galenika Zemun	2–0	0–2	
1997	UEFA Intertoto Cup	Group 9	(Austria)	Austria Wien	3–1	–	
1997	UEFA Intertoto Cup	Group 9	(Romania)	Rapid Bucharest	–	0–2	
1997	UEFA Intertoto Cup	Group 9	(France)	Olympique Lyon	0–5	–	
1997	UEFA Intertoto Cup	Group 9	(Poland)	Odra Wodzisław	–	0–0	
1999	UEFA Intertoto Cup	1. Round	(Denmark)	Herfølge Boldklub	2–0	2–0	4–0
1999	UEFA Intertoto Cup	2. Round	(France)	Metz	2–1	0–3	2–4
2002–03	UEFA Champions League	2. Round	(Switzerland)	Basel	1–1	0–3	1–4
2003–04	UEFA Champions League	2. Round	(Israel)	Maccabi Tel Aviv	1–0	1–1	2–1
2003–04	UEFA Champions League	3. Round	(England)	Chelsea	0–2	0–3	0–5
2003–04	UEFA Cup	1. Round	(Netherlands)	Utrecht	0–4	0–2	0–6
2004–05	UEFA Champions League	2. Round	(Romania)	Dinamo Bucharest	0–1	0–1	0–2
2005–06	UEFA Cup	1. Round	(Azerbaijan)	Baku	3–1	0–1	3–2
2005–06	UEFA Cup	2. Round	(Austria)	Austria Wien	1–2	2–2	3–4
2007–08	UEFA Champions League	1. Round	(Luxembourg)	F91 Dudelange	5–4	2–1	7–5
2007–08	UEFA Champions League	2. Round	(Czech Republic)	Slavia Prague	0–0	0–0	0–0 (3–4 p)
2008–09	UEFA Cup	1. Round	(Belarus)	MTZ-RIPO Minsk	1–0	2–2	3–2
2008–09	UEFA Cup	2. Round	(Czech Republic)	Slovan Liberec	2–1	2–1	4–2
2008–09	UEFA Cup	3. Round	(Bulgaria)	Levski Sofia	1–1	1–0	2–1
2008–09	UEFA Cup	Group F	(Germany)	Hamburg	1–2	–	
2008–09	UEFA Cup	Group F	(Netherlands)	Ajax Amsterdam	–	0–1	
2008–09	UEFA Cup	Group F	(Czech Republic)	Slavia Prague	0–0	–	
2008–09	UEFA Cup	Group F	(England)	Aston Villa	–	2–1	
2009–10	UEFA Europa League	2. Round	(Moldova)	Dacia Chişinău	2–0	1–0	3–0
2009–10	UEFA Europa League	3. Round	(Croatia)	Hajduk Split	1–1	1–0	2–1
2009–10	UEFA Europa League	Play-off Round	(Serbia)	Partizan Belgrade	0–2	1–1	1–3
2010–11	UEFA Champions League	2. Round	(Malta)	Birkirkara	3–0	0–1	3–1
2010–11	UEFA Champions League	3. Round	(Bulgaria)	Litex Lovech	3–1	1–1	4–2
2010–11	UEFA Champions League	Play-off Round	(Czech Republic)	Sparta Prague	1–0	2–0	3–0
2010–11	UEFA Champions League	Group F	(England)	Chelsea	1–4	1–2	
2010–11	UEFA Champions League	Group F	(France)	Olympique Marseille	0–7	0–1	
2010–11	UEFA Champions League	Group F	(Russia)	Spartak Moscow	1–2	0–3	
2011–12	UEFA Europa League	2. Round	(Iceland)	KR Reykjavík	2–0	0–3	2–3
2012–13	UEFA Champions League	2. Round	(Israel)	Ironi Kiryat Shmona	1–0	0–2	1–2
2013–14	UEFA Europa League	1. Round	(Georgia (country))	Torpedo Kutaisi	3–3	3–0	6–3
2013–14	UEFA Europa League	2. Round	(Slovenia)	Olimpija Ljubljana	2–0	1–3	3–3 (a.)
2013–14	UEFA Europa League	3. Round	(Croatia)	Rijeka	1–1	1–2	2–3
2015–16	UEFA Europa League	1. Round	(Northern Ireland)	Glentoran	3–0	4–1	7–1
2015–16	UEFA Europa League	2. Round	(Moldova)	Dacia Chișinău	4–2	2–1	6–3
2015–16	UEFA Europa League	3. Round	(Ukraine)	Vorskla Poltava	2–0	1–3 (a.e.t.)	3–3 (a.)
2015–16	UEFA Europa League	Play-off round	(Spain)	Athletic Bilbao	3–2	0–1	3–3 (a.)
2017–18	UEFA Champions League	2. Round	(Denmark)	Copenhagen	1–3	2–1	3–4
2020–21	UEFA Europa League	1. Round	(Wales)	The New Saints	—N/a	1–3 (a.e.t.)	—N/a
2021–22	UEFA Europa Conference League	1. Round	(Georgia (country))	Dila Gori	5–1	1–2	6–3
2021–22	UEFA Europa Conference League	2. Round	(Cyprus)	Apollon Limassol	2–2	3–1	5–3
2021–22	UEFA Europa Conference League	3. Round	(Kazakhstan)	Tobol	5−0	1–0	6−0
2021–22	UEFA Europa Conference League	Play-off round	(Czech Republic)	Jablonec	0–3	1–5	1–8
2023–24	UEFA Europa Conference League	1. Round	(Estonia)	FCI Levadia	2–1	2–1	4–2
2023–24	UEFA Europa Conference League	2. Round	(Belgium)	Gent	2–5	1–5	3–10
2025–26	UEFA Conference League	2. Round	(Poland)	Raków Częstochowa	1–3	0–3	1–6
2026–27	UEFA Europa League	1. Round	(Croatia)	Hajduk Split	2–1	0–2	2–3
2026–27	UEFA Conference League	2. Round	(Poland)	GKS Katowice	2–1	1–3	3–4

== Player records ==
=== Most goals ===
#	Nat.	Name	Goals
1	(Slovakia)	Jozef Bielek	86
1	(Czechoslovakia)	Štefan Slezák	86
2	(Slovakia)	Marek Mintál	76
3	(Slovakia)	Stanislav Šesták	49
4	(Slovakia)	Dávid Ďuriš	47
5	(Slovakia)	Michal Škvarka	43
6	(Slovakia)	**Miroslav Káčer**	40
7	(Slovakia)	Róbert Jež	35

Players whose name is listed in bold are still active.

==== Top Goalscorer ====
Slovak League Top scorer since 1993–94

Year	Winner	G
1954–55	(Czechoslovakia) Emil Pažický	19^{1}
2001–02	(Slovakia) Marek Mintál	21
2002–03	(Slovakia) Marek Mintál	20^{1}
2002–03	(Slovakia) Martin Fabuš	20^{1}
2014–15	(Croatia) Matej Jelić	19^{1}
2016–17	(Slovakia) Filip Hlohovský	20^{1}
2017–18	(Slovakia) Samuel Mráz	21
2020–21	(Poland) Dawid Kurminowski	19
2025–26	(Slovakia) Michal Faško	14

^{1}Shared award

== Notable players ==
Had international caps for their respective countries. Players whose name is listed in bold represented their countries while playing for MŠK.

Past (and present) players who are the subjects of Wikipedia articles can be found here.

- (Slovakia) Juraj Ančic
- (Ghana) **Benson Anang**
- (Togo) **Serge Akakpo**
- (Benin) **Bello Babatounde**
- (Slovakia) **Miroslav Barčík**
- (Slovakia) **Kristián Bari**
- (Slovakia) Ivan Belák
- (Slovakia) László Bénes
- (Slovakia) **Jozef Bielek**
- (Armenia) **Vahan Bichakhchyan**
- (Slovakia) **Róbert Boženík**
- (Slovakia) Mário Breška
- (The Gambia) **Momodou Ceesay**
- (Slovakia) Juraj Chvátal
- (Moldova) **Eugeniu Cociuc**
- (Slovakia) **Marián Čišovský**
- (Czech Republic) Marek Čech
- (Albania) (North Macedonia) Besir Demiri
- (Peru) Jean Deza
- (Slovakia) **Peter Doležaj**
- (Slovakia) Martin Dúbravka
- (Slovakia) **Martin Ďurica**
- (Slovakia) **Dávid Ďuriš**
- (Slovakia) Martin Fabuš
- (Slovakia) Ľubomír Faktor
- (Slovakia) **Michal Faško**
- (North Macedonia) Enis Fazlagić
- (Slovakia) Roland Galčík
- (Czechoslovakia) Dušan Galis
- (Slovakia) Roman Gergel
- (Czechoslovakia) Stanislav Griga
- (Slovakia) Dávid Guba
- (Slovakia) Ľubomír Guldan
- (Slovakia) Dávid Hancko
- (Bosnia and Herzegovina) Nermin Haskić
- (Slovakia) **Filip Hlohovský**
- (Slovakia) Dominik Holec
- (Slovakia) **Jakub Holúbek**
- (Czechoslovakia) Alexander Horváth
- (Slovakia) **Tomáš Hubočan**
- (Slovakia) Miroslav Hýll
- (Czechoslovakia) (Slovakia) **Viliam Hýravý**
- (Lithuania) Eligijus Jankauskas
- (Slovakia) **Róbert Jež**
- (Slovakia) **Miroslav Káčer**
- (Slovakia) **Adrián Kaprálik**
- (Czech Republic) Filip Kaša
- (Bosnia and Herzegovina) Semir Kerla
- (Czechoslovakia) Vladimír Kinier
- (Slovakia) Peter Kiška
- (Poland) Jakub Kiwior
- (Slovakia) Miroslav König
- (Slovakia) **Martin Králik**
- (Czechoslovakia) **Anton Krásnohorský**
- (Slovakia) **Dušan Kuciak**
- (Slovakia) **Branislav Labant**
- (Slovakia) Vladimír Labant
- (Vietnam) Patrik Le Giang
- (Slovakia) Vladimír Leitner
- (Georgia (country)) Luka Lochoshvili
- (Czech Republic) Aleš Mandous
- (Cameroon) **Ernest Mabouka**
- (Slovakia) **Róbert Mazáň**
- (Slovakia) **Jaroslav Mihalík**
- (Slovakia) **Marek Mintál**
- (Czechoslovakia) (Slovakia) Ladislav Molnár
- (Czechoslovakia) Anton Moravčík
- (Slovakia) Samuel Mráz
- (Slovakia) Ján Mucha
- (Czechoslovakia) Peter Mutkovič
- (Slovakia) **Adam Nemec**
- (Slovakia) Peter Németh
- (Slovakia) Branislav Niňaj
- (Slovakia) Ján Novák
- (South Africa) **Ricardo Nunes**
- (Slovakia) Tomáš Oravec
- (Slovakia) Tobiáš Pališčák
- (Czechoslovakia) Emil Pažický
- (Slovakia) **Mário Pečalka**
- (Slovakia) **Viktor Pečovský**
- (Slovakia) Peter Pekarík
- (Slovakia) **Dušan Perniš**
- (Slovakia) František Plach
- (Slovakia) Andrej Porázik
- (Hungary) István Priboj
- (Slovakia) Ľubomír Reiter
- (Slovakia) (Czechoslovakia) Theodor Reimann
- (Slovakia) Štefan Rusnák
- (Slovakia) Branislav Rzeszoto
- (Slovakia) Leo Sauer
- (Azerbaijan) **Ramil Sheydayev**
- (Slovakia) **Dušan Sninský**
- (Slovakia) Miroslav Seman
- (Slovakia) **Stanislav Šesták**
- (Slovakia) Milan Škriniar
- (Slovakia) **Michal Škvarka**
- (Slovakia) **Zdeno Štrba**
- (Slovakia) Peter Štyvar
- (Australia) Aleksandar Susnjar
- (Slovakia) Lukáš Tesák
- (Benin) Tony Toklomety
- (Slovakia) Michal Tomič
- (Slovakia) **Ivan Trabalík**
- (Slovakia) Kristián Vallo
- (Slovakia) **Denis Vavro**
- (Bosnia and Herzegovina) Velimir Vidić
- (Bosnia and Herzegovina) **Admir Vladavić**
- (Slovenia) **Dare Vršič**
- (Benin) **Salomon Wisdom**
- (Slovakia) **Radoslav Zabavník**
- (Latvia) Artūrs Zjuzins

== List of MŠK Žilina managers ==
- (Czechoslovakia) (Hungary) István Priboj (1935 - 1936)
- (Hungary) Antal Mally (1946 - 1949)
- (Czechoslovakia) Anton Bulla (1961 - 1962)
- (Czechoslovakia) Štefan Jačiansky
- (Czechoslovakia) Oldřich Šubrt (1967)
- (Czechoslovakia) Vojtech Schottert (1967 - 1968)
- (Czechoslovakia) Arnošt Hložek (1968 – 1969)
- (Czechoslovakia) Teodor Reiman (1970 – 1973)
- (Czechoslovakia) Jozef Marušin (1973)
- (Czechoslovakia) Michal Baránek (1974 – 1975)
- (Czechoslovakia) Jozef Marko (1975 – 1977)
- (Czechoslovakia) Eduard Hančin (1977 – 1978)
- (Czechoslovakia) Michal Pucher (1978)
- (Czechoslovakia) Karol Pecze (1979 – 1981)
- (Czechoslovakia) Viliam Meissner (1981 – 1982)
- (Czechoslovakia) Kamil Majerník (1982 – 1984)
- (Czechoslovakia) Emil Bezdeda (1984 – 1985)
- (Czechoslovakia) Jozef Jankech (1985 – 1987)
- (Czechoslovakia) Albert Rusnák (1987 – 1988)
- (Czechoslovakia) Vladimír Židek (1988)
- (Czechoslovakia) Karel Brückner (1988 – 1989)
- (Czechoslovakia) Oldřich Sedláček (1989 – 1991)
- (Slovakia) Jozef Zigo (1991 – 1993)
- (Slovakia) Miroslav Kráľ (1994)
- (Slovakia) Štefan Slezák (1994 – 1995)
- (Slovakia) Jozef Zigo (1995)
- (Slovakia) Stanislav Griga (1995 – 1996)
- (Slovakia) Dušan Radolský (1996 – 1997)
- (Slovakia) Anton Jánoš (1998 – 1999)
- (Slovakia) Jozef Barmoš (1999 – 2000)
- (Slovakia) Miroslav Turianik (2000)
- (Slovakia) Ladislav Jurkemik (2000 – 2001)
- (Czech Republic) Leoš Kalvoda (2002)
- (Czech Republic) František Komňacký (2002)
- (Slovakia) Jaroslav Rybár (2003)
- (Slovakia) Milan Lešický (2003)
- (Czech Republic) Juraj Šimurka (2003)
- (Slovakia) Ladislav Jurkemik (2004 – 2005)
- (Slovakia) Karol Pecze (2005)
- (Slovakia) Milan Nemec (2005 – 2005)
- (Croatia) Marijan Vlak (2006)
- (Czech Republic) Pavel Vrba (2006 – 2008)
- (Slovakia) Dušan Radolský (2008 – 2009)
- (Slovakia) Vladimir Kutka (2009)
- (Czech Republic) Pavel Hapal (2009 – 2011)
- (Slovakia) Ľubomír Nosický (2011 – 2012)
- (Netherlands) Frans Adelaar (2012 – 2013)
- (Slovakia) Štefan Tarkovič (2013)
- (Slovakia) Adrián Guľa (2013 – 2018)
- (Slovakia) Jaroslav Kentoš (2018 – 2019)
- (Slovakia) Pavol Staňo (2020 – 2021)
- (Slovakia) Peter Černák (10/2021 – 03/2022)
- (Slovakia) Ivan Belák (03/2022 – 05/2022) (Carateker)
- (Czech Republic) Jaroslav Hynek (06/2022 – 04/2024)
- (Czech Republic) Michal Ščasný (04/2024 – 05/2025)
- (Czech Republic) Petr Ruman (06/2025 – 07/2025)
- (Slovakia) Pavol Staňo (07/2025 – 08/2026)
- (Slovakia) Vladimír Veselý (08/2026 - )
