= Vladimír Gombár =

Slovak football coach

Personal information
- Full name: Vladimír Gombár
- Date of birth: 27 September 1961 (age 65)
- Place of birth: Stropkov, Czechoslovakia
- Position: Midfielder

Youth career
- Stropkov

Senior career*
Years	Team	Apps	(Gls)
1980	Stropkov		
1980–1991	Tatran Prešov	174	(25)
1987–1988	→ Dukla Banská Bystrica (loan)	29	(7)
1991–1992	Austria Klagenfurt		
1992–1994	Lokomotíva Košice		
1994–1995	Stropkov		
1994	→ Humenné (loan)	2	(0)

Managerial career
- 1998–2000: Humenné
- 2001–2002: Prešov (assistant manager)
- 2002–2004: Prešov
- 2006–2008: Spišská Nová Ves
- 2011: Spišská Nová Ves
- 2013: Prešov (assistant manager)
- * Club domestic league appearances and goals as of 18 April 2013

Vladimír Gombár (born 27 September 1961 in Stropkov) is a Slovak football coach.
