= Štefan Tarkovič =

Slovak football manager

Personal information
- Full name: Štefan Tarkovič
- Date of birth: 18 February 1973 (age 53)
- Place of birth: Prešov, Czechoslovakia
- Height: 1.80 m (5 ft 11 in)
- Position: Left-back

Youth career
- Tatran Prešov

Senior career*
Years	Team	Apps	(Gls)
1990–1996	Tatran Prešov	218	(16)

Managerial career
- 1997–2002: Slovakia WU19
- 2009–2011: Slovakia U18
- 2010–2011: Košice
- 2011–2013: Tatran Prešov
- 2013–2018: Žilina
- 2018: Slovakia
- 2020–2022: Slovakia
- 2023–2024: Kyrgyzstan
- 2026–: FC Aktobe
- * Club domestic league appearances and goals

Štefan Tarkovič (born 18 February 1973) is a Slovak football manager and a former player. Previously, he headed the national teams of Kyrgyzstan and his native Slovakia as well as various Slovak clubs such as Žilina, Tatran Prešov and Košice.

== Managerial ==
On 24 April 2023, the Kyrgyz Football Union announced Tarkovič as the new Head Coach of Kyrgyzstan.

== Managerial statistics ==
As of 11 June 2024

Team	From	To	Record				
Team	From	To	G	W	D	L	Win %
Košice	September 2010	June 2021	23	7	6	10	30.43
Tatran Prešov	July 2011	January 2012	21	4	6	11	19.05
Žilina	January 2013	June 2013	17	4	6	7	23.53
Slovakia	October 2018	October 2018	1	0	1	0	0.00
Slovakia	October 2020	June 2022	22	8	7	7	36.36
Kyrgyzstan	24 April 2023	June 2024	19	6	4	9	31.58
Career total			107	33	30	44	30.84
