= Ladislav Totkovič =

Slovak footballer (1962–2016)

Personal information
- Date of birth: 12 March 1962
- Place of birth: Ružomberok, Czechoslovakia
- Date of death: 28 January 2016 (aged 53)

Senior career*
Years	Team	Apps	(Gls)
- Inter Bratislava

International career
- ČSSR youths

Managerial career
- Levice
- MŠO Štúrovo
- 2002–2004: Ružomberok (assistant manager)
- Košice (youths manager)
- Šaľa
- Liptovský Mikuláš
- Harimau Muda A (technical-tactical advisor)
- 2011: Nitra (assistant manager)
- 2011–2012: Ružomberok (assistant manager)
- 2012: Tatran Prešov B
- 2012–2013: Tatran Prešov
- 2013: Zlaté Moravce
- 2013–2014: Malacca United
- 2014: Al-Ahly (Assistant)
- 2015: MFK Skalica (Assistant)
- * Club domestic league appearances and goals

Ladislav Totkovič (12 March 1962 – 28 January 2016) was a Slovak football player and manager. His former club was also 1. FC Tatran Prešov. In October 2013 he was appointed manager of Malacca United.
