= Ladislav Pavlovič =

Slovak footballer (1926–2013)

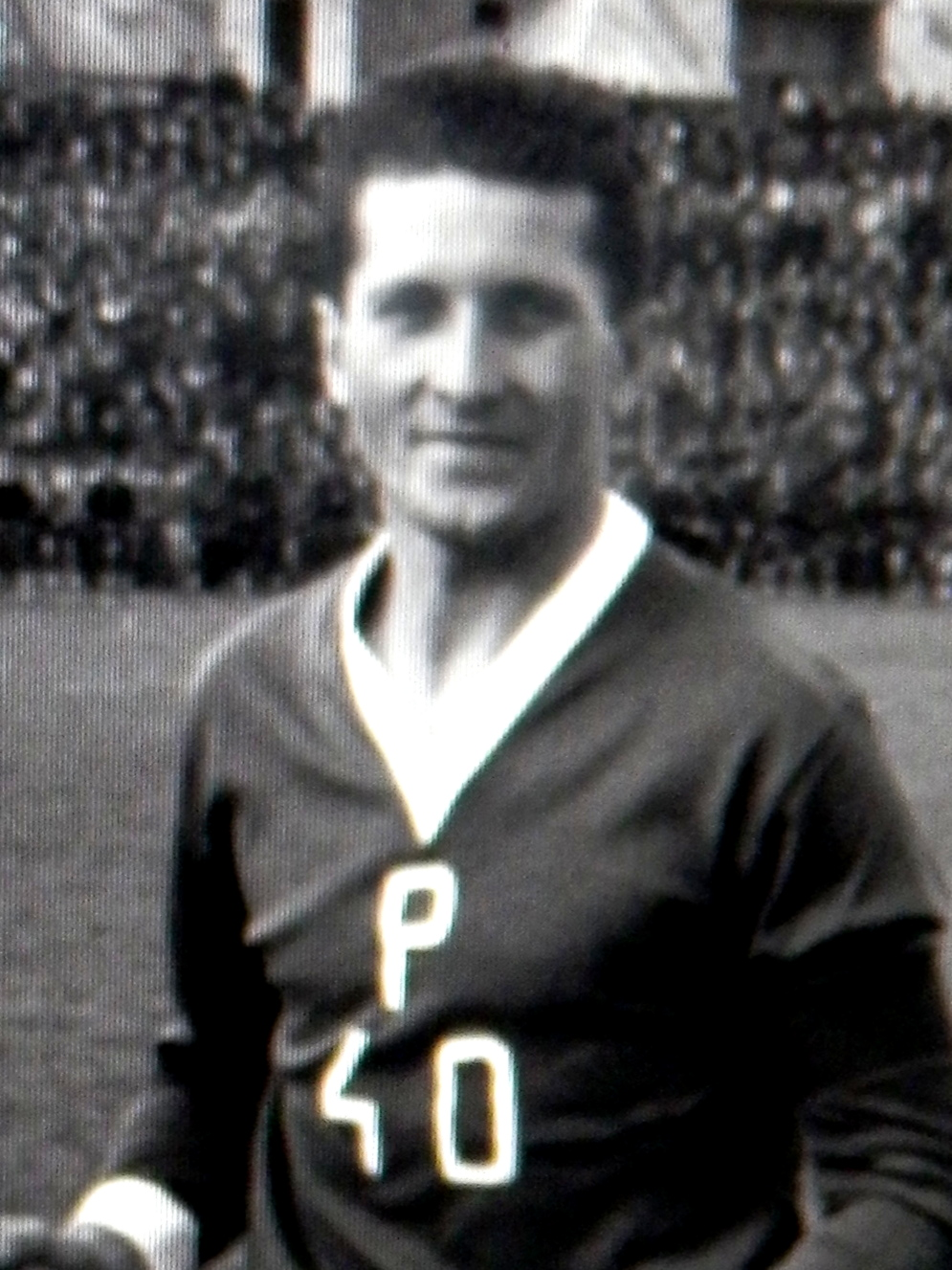

Personal information
- Date of birth: 8 April 1926
- Place of birth: Prešov, Czechoslovakia
- Date of death: 28 January 2013 (aged 86)
- Place of death: Prešov, Slovakia
- Position: Winger

Youth career
- Slávia Prešov

Senior career*
Years	Team	Apps	(Gls)
1948–1966	Tatran Prešov	309	(150)
1954–1956	ČH Bratislava	38	(14)
Total		347	(164)

International career
1952–1960	Czechoslovakia	14	(2)
	Czechoslovakia "B"	3	
	Czechoslovakia Olympic	3	
- * Club domestic league appearances and goals

Ladislav Pavlovič (8 April 1926 – 28 January 2013) was a Slovak footballer. A winger, he played for Czechoslovakia national team in 14 matches and scored two goals. He was a participant at the Euro 1960, where he played in five matches and scored a goal in a match against France. Pavlovič played mostly for Tatran Prešov (1950–1953, 1956–1965/66: 150 goals) and also briefly for CH Bratislava (1954–1955: 14 goals), giving him a total of 164 league goals in 345 games.
