= FK Slavoj Trebišov =

Slovak football club

- Full name: Futbalový Klub; Slavoj Trebišov
- Nickname: Slavoj
- Founded: 1912
- Ground: Mestský štadión Trebišov, Trebišov
- Capacity: 3,000
- President: Eduard Janoško
- League: None
- 2023–24: 2. liga, 13th of 16 (Withdraw from the league)
- Website: http://www.slavojtrebisov.sk
| Home colours | Away colours |

FK Slavoj Trebišov is a Slovak football team, based in the town of Trebišov. The club was founded in 1912. It played Doxxbet liga in the 2014–2015 season but was relegated in its first season in Doxxbet liga. As of the 2015–16 season, they were playing 3.rd Slovak League. They was 6th in the 2015–16 season. In the 2016–2017 season, the club won 3. Liga East and was promoted to 2. Liga, where they competed in 2. liga until the 2023-24 season. Then despite fact that the club ensured place for the 2. liga 2024-25 season (as finished 13th), the club have decided to withdraw from the 2. liga due to financial issues.

The club currently acts as a feeder club for MFK Zemplín Michalovce.

== Crest and colours ==
=== Manufacturers and shirt sponsors ===
The following table shows in detail FK Slavoj Trebišov kit manufacturers and shirt sponsors by year:

| Period | Kit manufacturer | Shirt sponsor |
|---|---|---|
| 2014-? | Colo | ZAPA beton |
| ?-2018 | Adidas | Deva |
| 2018– | Adidas | Armstav |

== Recent squad ==
As of 1 March 2024

Note: Flags indicate national team as defined under FIFA eligibility rules; some limited exceptions apply. Players may hold more than one non-FIFA nationality.

| No. | Pos. | Nation | Player |
|---|---|---|---|
| 1 | GK | SVK | Dávid Slávik |
| 2 | DF | MKD | Bilal Iseni |
| 3 | DF | SVK | Roland Buhaj |
| 4 | DF | SVK | Tomáš Ilinjo (Vice-captain) |
| 5 | MF | POL | Michael Wyparło |
| 6 | DF | SVK | Ervín Matta |
| 7 | MF | SVK | Boris Druga (on loan from Komárno) |
| 8 | MF | SVK | Michal Matúš |
| 9 | FW | SVK | Viktor Tatár |
| 10 | FW | MOZ | Pablo Bechardas |
| 11 | FW | SVK | Matúš Smieško (on loan from FC Košice) |
| 12 | MF | SVK | Norbert Matta |

| No. | Pos. | Nation | Player |
|---|---|---|---|
| 13 | MF | KOR | Song Hwan-young |
| 14 | DF | SVK | František Pavúk (on loan from FC Košice) |
| 15 | MF | CMR | Frankline Tangiri |
| 16 | MF | SVK | František Sitarčík |
| 17 | DF | SVK | Marián Tandara |
| 18 | FW | SVK | Jakub Škovran |
| 19 | FW | SVK | Filip Pálfi |
| 20 | FW | GEO | Bakur Jinjolava |
| 21 | GK | SVK | Ľudovít Pap |
| 22 | GK | UKR | Ivan Tyurin |
| 23 | MF | SVK | Vladimír Bajtoš |

For recent transfers, see List of Slovak football transfers summer 2023.

== Notable players ==
The following players had international caps for their respective countries. Players whose name is listed in bold represented their countries while playing for Slavoj.

Past (and present) players who are the subjects of Wikipedia articles can be found here.

- (Slovakia) Marek Čech
- (Czechoslovakia) Jaroslav Červeňan
- (Slovakia) Jaroslav Kolbas
- (Curaçao) Doriano Kortstam
- (Slovakia) Ján Novák
- (Greece) Lazaros Rota
- (Slovakia) Dušan Sninský
- (Slovakia) Igor Žofčák

== Notable managers ==
- (Czechoslovakia) Jozef Karel (1961–1963)
- (Czechoslovakia) Jozef Karel (1972–1977)
- (Czechoslovakia) Belo Malaga (1979–1982)
- (Czechoslovakia) Štefan Nadzam (1987–1989)
- (Slovakia) Mikuláš Komanický (1993–1995)
- (Slovakia) Vladimír Rusnák (2014)
- (Slovakia) Martin Uporsky (2015)
- (Slovakia) Vladimír Rusnák (July 2017 – Jam 2018)
- (Slovakia) Karol Kisel (Jan 2018 - Oct 2018)
- (Slovakia) Vladimír Rusnák (Oct 2018 – June 2019)
- (Slovakia) Ľuboš Benkovský (July 2019–June 2020)
- (Slovakia) Ondrej Desiatnik (June 2020-June 2022)
- (Slovakia) Gergely Geri (June 2022 - Jan 2023)
- (Slovakia) Branislav Sokoli (Jan 2023 - July 2023)
- (Slovakia) Ondrej Desiatnik (July 2023 - June 2024 )
