= Ferenc Szedlacsek =

Czechoslovak and Hungarian footballer (1898–1973)

Personal information
- Date of birth: 10 October 1898
- Place of birth: Budapest, Austria-Hungary
- Date of death: 14 November 1973 (aged 75)
- Place of death: Prague, Czechoslovakia
- Position: Midfielder

Senior career*
Years	Team	Apps	(Gls)
1925–1926	DFC Prag	6	(5)
1926–1927	Brooklyn Wanderers		
1927–1932	Ferencváros		
1932–1933	SK Nachod	16	(6)

International career
1925–1926	Czechoslovakia	2	(1)
1928	Hungary	1	(0)
- * Club domestic league appearances and goals

Ferenc Szedlacsek (10 October 1898 – 14 November 1973), also known as František Sedláček, was a footballer who played international football for both Czechoslovakia and Hungary. He played as a midfielder for DFC Prag, Brooklyn Wanderers and Ferencváros.

He later had a long career as a coach in Czechoslovakia.
