= TJ Rozvoj Pušovce =

Slovak football club

- Full name: TJ Rozvoj Pušovce
- Ground: Stadium FK Pušovce, Pušovce, Slovakia
- Head coach: Michal Štefaník
- League: 4. Liga (North)
- 2016–17: 3. liga (East), 14th (relegated)
- Website: http://fkpusovce.webnode.sk/

TJ Rozvoj Pušovce is a Slovak association football club located in Pušovce. It currently plays in 3. Liga (East) (3rd level).

== Colors and badge ==
Its colors are blue and white.
