= 1. FC Tatran Prešov =

Slovak football club

Tatran Prešov
- Full name: FC Tatran Prešov
- Nicknames: Zeleno-Bieli (The Green-Whites); Koňare (Horsemen)
- Founded: 25 May 1898; 128 years ago as ETVE Prešov
- Ground: Futbal Tatran Arena
- Capacity: 6,500
- Owner: TATRAN rescue capital
- Chairman: Martin Dupkala
- Head coach: Roman Pivarník
- League: 2. Liga
- 2025–26: Niké liga, 12th of 12 (relegated)
- Website: fctatran.sk
| Home colours | Away colours | Third colours |

FC Tatran Prešov (Slovak pronunciation: [ˈtatran ˈpreʂɔw]) is a Slovak football club based in the city of Prešov, currently playing in the 2. Liga, the second tier of Slovak football. Tatran Prešov is the oldest football club in Slovakia, founded on 25 May 1898. The club participated in the Slovak First Football League from 2025–26, the top tier of Slovak football after promotion from 2. Liga in 2024–25. The "Green and Whites" played 32 seasons in the Czechoslovak top division. Tatran became the dark horse of the Czechoslovak league in the 1960s and 1970s, but never won a title. Their best league result was a second-place finish in the 1965 and 1973 seasons. The club also came close in the Czechoslovak Cup, losing twice in 1966 and 1992 finals.

== History overview ==
=== Early history ===
Eperjesi TVE in 1904

The first official football match on the territory of present-day Slovakia took place on 25 May 1898 in Eperjes, today's Prešov, that time in Hungary, between two Budapest-based teams, Óbudai TE and Budapesti TC on the initiation of František Pethe, a gymnastic teacher in the local grammar school. On the same day the Eperjesi Torna és Vívó Egyesület (Eperjesi TVE, lit. Gymnastic and Fencing Association of Eperjes) was founded, which is regarded as the first football club of Slovakia.

Eperjesi TVE initially competed in the Hungarian league system, achieving its best result in the 1907–08 season, when it won the Northern District Championship.

In 1920 Prešov became part of the newly founded Czechoslovakia, subsequently the club competed in the Czechoslovak leagues.

Prešov finished in second place in the Czechoslovak First League in 1965 and 1973, finishing the season just one point behind champions Spartak Trnava in the 1972–73 season. In the national cup the team also had success, reaching the final of the Czechoslovak Cup in 1966, where they lost to Dukla Prague and in 1992 where Sparta Prague were victorious.

The greatest legend of Tatran's history is Ladislav Pavlovič. From 1948 until 1966, he netted for Tatran Prešov 150 goals in 309 matches. He also represented Czechoslovakia national football team, where he played 14 matches and scored two goals. In 2013, he was stated to Prešov's Hall of Fame.

On 2 May 2025, Tataran Prešov secured the first place in the 2. Liga, and promotion to Slovak First Football League after defeating FC ŠTK 1914 Šamorín 1–2, returning to top tier after seven years of absence.

=== Previous names ===
- Eperjesi Torna és Vívó Egyesület (Hungarian version), ETVE Prešov (1898)
- TVE Prešov (1920)
- Slávia Prešov (1931)
- PTS Prešov (1945)
- DSO Slavia Prešov a DSO Snaha Prešov (split from PTS Prešov) (1947)
- Sparta Dukla Prešov (1948)
- Dukla Prešov (1950)
- Dukla ČSSZ Prešov (1951)
- ČSSZ Prešov (1952)
- DSO Tatran Prešov (1953)
- TJ Tatran Prešov (1960)
- Tatran Agro Prešov (1989)
- FC Tatran Prešov (1991)
- FC Tatran Bukóza Prešov (1996)
- FC Tatran Prešov (1998)
- 1.FC Tatran Prešov (2005)
- FC Tatran Prešov (2022)

== Honours ==
=== Domestic ===
Czechoslovakia

- Czechoslovak First League (1925–93)
  - Runners-up (2): 1964–65, 1972–73
- Czechoslovak Cup (1960–93)
  - Runners-up (2): 1965–66, 1991–92
- 1.SNL (1st Slovak National football league) (1969–1993)
  - Winners (2): 1979–80, 1989–90

Slovakia

- Slovenský Pohár (Slovak Cup) (1961–)
  - Winners (1): 1992
  - Runners-up (4): 1973, 1985, 1994, 1997
- 2. liga (Slovak second division)
  - Winners (3): 2007–08, 2015–16, 2024–25
  - Runners-up (1): 2022-23
  - Third (3): 2003–04, 2014–15, 2023-24
- 3. liga východ (Slovak third division east)
  - Winners (2): 2019–20, 2021–22
  - Third (1): 2020–21

==== Czechoslovak and Slovak Top Goalscorer ====
The Czechoslovak League top scorer from 1944 to 1945 until 1992–93. Since the 1993–94 Slovak League Top scorer.

| Year | Winner | G |
|---|---|---|
| 1960–61 | (Czechoslovakia) Ladislav Pavlovič | 17^{1} |
| 1962–63 | (Czechoslovakia) Karol Petroš | 19 |
| 1963–64 | (Czechoslovakia) Ladislav Pavlovič | 21 |

^{1}Shared award

=== European ===
- Mitropa Cup
  - Winners (1): 1981
- InterCup
  - Winners (1): 1978

== Results ==
=== League and Cup history ===
Slovak League only (1993–present)

| Season | Division (Name) | Pos./Teams | Pl. | W | D | L | GS | GA | P | Domestic Cup | Europe | | Top Scorer (Goals) |
|---|---|---|---|---|---|---|---|---|---|---|---|---|---|
| 1993–94 | 1st (Mars Superliga) | 4/(12) | 32 | 10 | 14 | 8 | 47 | 43 | 34 | Runner-up | | | |
| 1994–95 | 1st (Mars Superliga) | 9/(12) | 32 | 9 | 10 | 13 | 42 | 49 | 37 | 1/2 finals | UC | 2R ( (Spain) Real Zaragoza) | |
| 1995–96 | 1st (Mars Superliga) | 5/(12) | 32 | 12 | 7 | 13 | 34 | 36 | 43 | 1/32 finals | | | |
| 1996–97 | 1st (Mars Superliga) | 6/(16) | 30 | 12 | 7 | 11 | 37 | 38 | 43 | Runner-up | | | |
| 1997–98 | 1st (Mars Superliga) | 10/(16) | 30 | 9 | 9 | 12 | 29 | 39 | 36 | 1/4 finals | | | (Slovakia) Milan Jambor (5) |
| 1998–99 | 1st (Mars Superliga) | 8/(16) | 30 | 11 | 10 | 9 | 38 | 35 | 43 | 1/16 finals | | | (Slovakia) Vladimír Kožuch (7) (Slovakia) Anton Šoltis (7) |
| 1999–00 | 1st (Mars Superliga) | 6/(16) | 30 | 14 | 5 | 11 | 38 | 42 | 47 | 1/16 finals | | | (Slovakia) Vladimír Kožuch (8) |
| 2000–01 | 1st (Mars Superliga) | 7/(10) | 36 | 10 | 10 | 16 | 44 | 54 | 40 | 1/32 finals | | | (Slovakia) Marek Petruš (7) (Slovakia) Július Lelkeš (7) |
| 2001–02 | 1st (Mars Superliga) | 10/(10) | 36 | 8 | 7 | 21 | 35 | 66 | 40 | 1/16 finals | | | (Slovakia) Ján Šlahor (7) |
| 2002–03 | 2nd (1. liga) | 9/(16) | 30 | 11 | 6 | 13 | 40 | 37 | 39 | 1/4 finals | | | (Slovakia) Lukáš Hricov (7) |
| 2003–04 | 2nd (1. liga) | 3/(16) | 30 | 15 | 7 | 8 | 54 | 35 | 52 | 1/8 finals | | | (Slovakia) Martin Jakubko (13) |
| 2004–05 | 2nd (1. liga) | 5/(16) | 30 | 12 | 8 | 10 | 38 | 33 | 44 | 1/32 finals | | | (Slovakia) Ľubomír Pagor (7) |
| 2005–06 | 2nd (1. liga) | 5/(16) | 30 | 15 | 7 | 8 | 37 | 22 | 52 | 1/32 finals | | | (Slovakia) Peter Iskra (6) |
| 2006–07 | 2nd (1. liga) | 5/(12) | 36 | 16 | 14 | 6 | 55 | 25 | 62 | 1/8 finals | | | (Slovakia) Tomáš Kaplan (8) |
| 2007–08 | 2nd (1. liga) | 1/(12) | 33 | 23 | 8 | 2 | 64 | 14 | 77 | 1/4 finals | | | (Slovakia) Ľuboš Belejík (7) |
| 2008–09 | 1st (Corgoň Liga) | 7/(12) | 33 | 10 | 11 | 12 | 40 | 50 | 41 | 1/16 finals | | | (Slovakia) Peter Katona (7) |
| 2009–10 | 1st (Corgoň Liga) | 8/(12) | 33 | 11 | 5 | 17 | 32 | 38 | 38 | 1/8 finals | | | (Slovakia) Peter Katona (5) |
| 2010–11 | 1st (Corgoň Liga) | 11/(12) | 33 | 9 | 6 | 18 | 30 | 49 | 33 | 1/16 finals | | | (Brazil) Jhonatan (5) |
| 2011–12 | 1st (Corgoň Liga) | 10/(12) | 33 | 7 | 12 | 14 | 23 | 35 | 33 | 1/4 finals | | | (Slovakia) Peter Katona (5) |
| 2012–13 | 1st (Corgoň Liga) | 12/(12) | 33 | 8 | 9 | 16 | 21 | 41 | 33 | 1/16 finals | | | (Ukraine) Andriy Shevchuk (3) (Slovakia) Matúš Marcin (3) |
| 2013–14 | 2nd (DOXXbet Liga) | 4/(12) | 33 | 18 | 6 | 9 | 56 | 28 | 60 | 1/4 finals | | | (Slovakia) Dávid Leško (12) |
| 2014–15 | 2nd (DOXXbet Liga) | 3/(24) | 22 | 10 | 6 | 6 | 32 | 24 | 36 | 1/32 finals | | | (Slovakia) Pavol Šafranko (11) |
| 2015–16 | 2nd (DOXXbet Liga) | 1/(24) | 30 | 16 | 10 | 4 | 61 | 26 | 58 | 1/16 finals | | | (Slovakia) Dávid Leško (16) |
| 2016–17 | 1st (Fortuna Liga) | 11/(12) | 30 | 3 | 10 | 17 | 17 | 63 | 19 | 1/8 finals | | | (Nigeria) Musefiu Ashiru (5) |
| 2017–18 | 1st (Fortuna Liga) | 12/(12) | 31 | 4 | 11 | 16 | 20 | 55 | 23 | 1/32 finals | | | (Slovakia) Roland Černák (7) |
| 2018–19 | 2nd (II. liga) | 15/(16) | 30 | 7 | 6 | 17 | 30 | 41 | 27 | 1/32 finals | | | (Slovakia) Lukáš Hricov (3) |
| 2019–20 | 3rd (III. liga) | 1/(16) | 17 | 14 | 1 | 2 | 52 | 14 | 43 | 1/32 finals | | | (Slovakia) Kristián Hirka (12) |
| 2020–21 | 3rd (III. liga) | 3/(16) | 15 | 10 | 1 | 4 | 40 | 15 | 31 | 1/32 finals | | | (Slovakia) Samuel Gladiš (7) |
| 2021–22 | 3rd (III. liga) | 1/(16) | 30 | 25 | 2 | 3 | 103 | 20 | 77 | 1/32 finals | | | (Slovakia) Jozef Dolný (41) |
| 2022–23 | 2nd (2. liga) | 2/(16) | 30 | 19 | 2 | 8 | 49 | 24 | 62 | 1/4 finals | | | (Slovakia) Jozef Dolný (19) |
| 2023-24 | 2nd (MonacoBet Liga) | 3/(16) | 30 | 19 | 6 | 5 | 53 | 21 | 63 | 1/32 finals | | | (Slovakia) Jozef Dolný (18) |
| 2024-25 | 2nd (MonacoBet Liga) | 1/(14) | 26 | 20 | 3 | 3 | 51 | 19 | 63 | Quarter-finals | | | (Senegal) Landing Sagna (12) |
| 2025–26 | 1st (Niké liga) | 12/(12) | 32 | 6 | 12 | 14 | 29 | 43 | 30 | Semi-finals | | | (Slovakia) Martin Regáli (8) |

=== European competition history ===
| Season | Competition | Round | Country | Club | Home | Away | Aggregate |
|---|---|---|---|---|---|---|---|
| 1966–67 | Cup Winners' Cup | 1. | (Germany) | Bayern Munich | 1–1 | 2–3 | 3–4 |
| 1973–74 | UEFA Cup | 1. | (Socialist Federal Republic of Yugoslavia) | Velež Mostar | 4–2 | 1–1 | 5–3 |
| 1973–74 | UEFA Cup | 2. | (Germany) | VfB Stuttgart | 3–5(aet) | 1–3 | 4–8 |
| 1980–81 | Mitropa Cup | RR | (Hungary) | Csepel SC | 0–0 | 0–3 | |
| 1980–81 | Mitropa Cup | RR | (Italy) | Calcio Como | 4–1 | 0–1 | |
| 1980–81 | Mitropa Cup | RR | (Socialist Federal Republic of Yugoslavia) | NK Zagreb | 2–1 | 5–1 | |
| 1994–95 | Cup Winners' Cup | Q | (Northern Ireland) | Bangor F.C. | 4–0 | 1–0 | 5–0 |
| 1994–95 | Cup Winners' Cup | 1. | (Scotland) | Dundee United | 3–1 | 2–3 | 5–4 |
| 1994–95 | Cup Winners' Cup | 2. | (Spain) | Real Zaragoza | 0–4 | 1–2 | 1–6 |

== Rivalries ==
Tatran's biggest rivals are FC Košice, and the matches between the two teams are referred to as "Eastern Slovak derby" (Slovak: Východniarske derby).
They also have rivalry with MFK Zemplín Michalovce, also located in Eastern Slovakia. 1. FC Tatran Prešov supporters maintain friendly relations with fans of the Polish side JKS Czarni 1910 Jasło.

== Sponsorship ==
1. FC Tatran Prešov 11/12 season home kit.

| Period | Kit manufacturer | Shirt sponsor |
|---|---|---|
| 1998–2000 | ATAK Sportswear | OTF |
| 2000–2003 | ATAK Sportswear | ŠARIŠ |
| 2004 | ATAK Sportswear | Opel |
| 2005 | ATAK Sportswear | none |
| 2005–2008 | ATAK Sportswear | Poštová banka |
| 2008–2010 | ATAK Sportswear | Auto Leas |
| 2010–2011 | Adidas | none |
| 2011–2012 | Adidas | IMPA |
| 2012–2013 | Adidas | DÚHA |
| 2013–2021 | ATAK Sportswear | DÚHA |
| 2021–2022 | 3b | INTRAVENA |
| 2022–2023 | 3b | Niké |
| 2023 | Nike | Niké |
| 2024- | Adidas | Niké |

== Current squad ==
As of 21 July 2026

Note: Flags indicate national team as defined under FIFA eligibility rules; some limited exceptions apply. Players may hold more than one non-FIFA nationality.

| No. | Pos. | Nation | Player |
|---|---|---|---|
| 1 | GK | SVK | Adrián Knurovský |
| 3 | DF | SVK | Michal Sipľak |
| 4 | DF | SVK | Patrik Šimko (captain) |
| 9 | FW | SVK | Martin Regáli |
| 10 | MF | POL | Ricardo Gonçalves |
| 11 | FW | SVK | Stanislav Olejník |
| 17 | FW | UKR | Ruslan Leuta |
| 20 | MF | UKR | Artur Ukhan |
| 21 | DF | SVK | Martin Gomola |
| 24 | DF | SVK | Marek Terpák |
| 26 | DF | SVK | Richard Župa |
| 27 | DF | CZE | Jakub Tecl |

| No. | Pos. | Nation | Player |
|---|---|---|---|
| 28 | MF | CZE | Radim Pobořil |
| 29 | MF | SVK | Šimon Sabolčík |
| 31 | DF | SVK | Jozef Menich |
| 44 | MF | SVK | Jakub Molnár |
| 66 | FW | SVK | René Repaský |
| 68 | MF | SVK | Mário Hollý |
| 77 | FW | SVK | Matej Franko |
| 79 | FW | SVK | Dávid Griger |
| 80 | FW | SEN | Landing Sagna |
| 83 | GK | SVK | Adam Štapinský |
| 88 | MF | CZE | Daniel Suchý |
| 99 | GK | UKR | Maksym Kuchynskyi |

For recent transfers, see List of Slovak football transfers summer 2025 and List of Slovak football transfers winter 2025-26

=== Reserve team ===
1. FC Tatran Prešov juniori was the reserve team of 1. FC Tatran Prešov. They mostly played in the Slovak 3. Liga (Eastern division).

=== Current technical staff ===
Updated 2 September 2026

| Staff | Job title |
|---|---|
| (Slovakia) Roman Pivarník | Manager |
| (Slovakia) TBA | Assistant Manager |
| (Slovakia) Peter Barna | Team manager |
| (Slovakia) Marek Fabuľa | Sport Director |
| (Slovakia) Branislav Benko | Goalkeeping coach |
| (Slovakia) Jozef Vaño | Team Leader |
| (Slovakia) MUDr. Ján Mirilovič | Team Doctor |
| (Slovakia) MUDr. Július Svätojánsky | Team Doctor |
| (Slovakia) MUDr. Peter Cvengroš | Team Doctor |
| (Serbia) Igor Stojimirović | Masseur |
| (Slovakia) Vladimír Papp | Physiotherapist |
| (Slovakia) Dávid Balucha | Physiotherapist |

== Player records ==
=== Most goals ===
| # | Nat. | Name | Goals |
|---|---|---|---|
| 1 | (Czechoslovakia) | Ladislav Pavlovič | 150 |
| 2 | (Slovakia) | Jozef Dolný | 82 |
| 3 | (Czechoslovakia) | Karol Petroš | 67 |
| 4 | (Slovakia) (Czechoslovakia) | Jozef Kuchár | 56 |
| 5 | (Czechoslovakia) | Gejza Šimanský | 44 |
| 6 | (Slovakia) | Dávid Leško | 40 |
| 7 | (Slovakia) | Peter Katona | 39 |

Players whose name is listed in bold are still active.

== Notable players ==
Had international caps for their respective countries. Players whose name is listed in bold represented their countries while playing for Tatran.

For full list, see Category:1. FC Tatran Prešov players

- (Kuwait) Khaled Al-Rashidi
- (Latvia) Daniels Balodis
- (Romania) Daniel Boloca
- (Czechoslovakia) Pavol Biroš
- (Slovakia) Marián Bochnovič
- (Czechoslovakia) **Jozef Bomba**
- (Honduras) Mitchel Brown
- (Czechoslovakia) **Jozef Bubenko**
- (Czechoslovakia) **Jaroslav Červeňan**
- (Slovakia) (Czechoslovakia) **Miloslav Danko**
- (Slovakia) Miroslav Drobňák
- (Slovakia) Roman Gergel
- (Slovakia) Dávid Guba
- (Czechoslovakia) Kazimír Gajdoš
- (Slovakia) Michal Hanek
- (Slovakia) Róbert Hanko
- (Slovakia) Peter Hlinka
- (Zimbabwe) **Kennedy Chihuri**
- (Slovakia) Adam Jakubech
- (Slovakia) Martin Jakubko
- (Czechoslovakia) Justín Javorek
- (Czechoslovakia) **Ján Karel**
- (Slovakia) (Czechoslovakia) Jozef Karel
- (Slovakia) Jaroslav Kolbas
- (Czechoslovakia) **Mikuláš Komanický**
- (Slovakia) Jozef Kožlej
- (Slovakia) Vladimír Kožuch
- (Slovakia) Jozef Kuchár
- (Slovakia) Ľubomír Meszároš
- (Czechoslovakia) **Igor Novák**
- (Czechoslovakia) Jozef Obert
- (Czechoslovakia) **Ladislav Pavlovič**
- (Slovakia) Marek Penksa
- (Slovakia) Peter Petráš
- (Slovakia) Martin Polaček
- (Slovakia) Martin Regáli
- (Slovakia) Ľubomír Reiter
- (Moldova) **Ioan-Călin Revenco**
- (Slovakia) Tomáš Rigo
- (Slovakia) (Czechoslovakia) Theodor Reimann
- (Czechoslovakia) **František Semeši**
- (Slovakia) Pavol Šafranko
- (Slovakia) **Miroslav Seman**
- (Slovakia) Stanislav Šesták
- (Haiti) **Dominique Simon**
- (Czechoslovakia) **Gejza Šimanský**
- (Slovakia) Marek Špilár
- (Slovakia) Anton Šoltis
- (Czechoslovakia) Ján Strausz
- (Slovakia) Lukáš Štetina
- (Slovakia) Tomáš Suslov
- (Central African Republic) Séverin Tatolna
- (Slovakia) Lukáš Tesák
- (Slovakia) Milan Timko
- (Slovakia) Ľubomír Tupta
- (Slovakia) **Stanislav Varga**
- (Bosnia and Herzegovina) Avdija Vršajević
- (Czech Republic) Daniel Zítka
- (Slovakia) **Vladislav Zvara**

== Notable fan ==
- (Czech Republic) Milan Timoš (1948–2012)

== Notable managers ==
- (Austria-Hungary) František Pethe (1898–1904)
- (Hungary) Iszer Károly (September 1898)
- (Slovakia) Bohumil Peťura (1940–1941)
- (Slovakia) Július Grobár (1941–1942)
- (Slovakia) Jozef Kuchár (1942–1943)
- (Slovakia) Július Grobár (1943)
- (Slovakia) Vojtech Herdický (1943)
- (Hungary) Ferenc Szedlacsek (1950)
- (Czechoslovakia) Jozef Karel (1951–1957)
- (Czechoslovakia) Jozef Steiner (1957–1959)
- (Czechoslovakia) Gejza Šimanský (1959)
- (Czechoslovakia) Štefan Jačianský (1960–1961)
- (Czechoslovakia) Jozef Kuchár (1961–1962)
- (Czechoslovakia) Gejza Sabanoš (1962–1964)
- (Czechoslovakia) Jozef Karel (1964–1965)
- (Czechoslovakia) Jozef Steiner (1965–1966)
- (Czechoslovakia) Jozef Karel (1966)
- (Czechoslovakia) Teodor Reimann (1967–1968)
- (Czechoslovakia) Jozef Karel (1968–1972)
- (Czechoslovakia) Milan Moravec (1972–1974)
- (Czechoslovakia) Ladislav Pavlovič (1974)
- (Czechoslovakia) Jozef Tarcala (1975)
- (Czechoslovakia) Štefan Jačianský (1976–1978)
- (Czechoslovakia) Belo Malaga (1978–1979)
- (Czechoslovakia) Michal Baránek (1979)
- (Czechoslovakia) Štefan Hojsík (1979–1981)
- (Czechoslovakia) Ján Zachar (1981–1982)
- (Czechoslovakia) Valér Švec (1982–1984)
- (Czechoslovakia) Jozef Jarabinský (1984–1985)
- (Czechoslovakia) Justin Javorek (1985–1986)
- (Czechoslovakia) Peter Majer (1986–1987)
- (Czechoslovakia) Juraj Mihalčín (1987–1988)
- (Czechoslovakia) Albert Rusnák (1988)
- (Czechoslovakia) Štefan Nadzam (1989–1993)
- (Slovakia) Igor Novák (1993–1994)
- (Slovakia) Belo Malaga (1994–1995)
- (Slovakia) Anton Jánoš (1995–1997)
- (Slovakia) Andrej Daňko (1997–1998)
- (Slovakia) Jozef Adamec (1998–1999)
- (Slovakia) Mikuláš Komanický (1999–2001)
- (Czech Republic) Jindřich Dejmal (2001–2002)
- (Slovakia) Vladimír Gombár (2002)
- (Slovakia) Ján Molka (2002)
- (Slovakia) Vladimír Gombár (2002–2004)
- (Slovakia) Karol Kisel (2004)
- (Slovakia) Mikuláš Komanický (2004–2005)
- (Slovakia) Štefan Horný (July – September 2005)
- (Slovakia) Jaroslav Rybár (September 2005 – 2006)
- (Lithuania) Saulius Širmelis (January – 6 July 2006)
- (Slovakia) Ján Karaffa (July 2006)
- (Slovakia) Jozef Daňko (August 2006)
- (Slovakia) Peter Polák (August 2006 – February 2007)
- (Slovakia) Roman Pivarník (Feb. 2007 – August 2010)
- (Slovakia) Ladislav Pecko (Sept. 2010 – June 2011)
- (Slovakia) Štefan Tarkovič (July 2011 – January 2012)
- (Ukraine) Serhiy Kovalets (January – June 2012)
- (Bulgaria) Angel Chervenkov (July – November 2012)
- (Slovakia) Ladislav Totkovič (Nov. 2012 – April 2013)
- (Slovakia) Jozef Bubenko (April – May 2013)
- (Slovakia) Jozef Kostelník (June 2013 – May 2014)
- (Slovakia) Stanislav Varga (July 2014 - 14 October 2016)
- (Slovakia) Ján Karaffa (carateker) (October 2016)
- (Slovakia) Miroslav Jantek (Nove 2016 - Sept 2017)
- (Slovakia) Pavol Mlynár (Sept 2017 – Oct 2017) (interim)
- (Ukraine) Serhiy Kovalets (Oct 2017 - Jan. 2018)
- (Czech Republic) Anton Mišovec (January 2018 - April 2019)
- (Slovakia) Jaroslav Galko (April - June 2019)
- (Slovakia) Peter Petráš (July 2019 - July 2021)
- (Slovakia) Stanislav Šesták (July 2021 - June 2022)
- (Slovakia) Róbert Petruš (July 2021 - June 2022)
- (Slovakia) Marek Petruš (June 2022 - June 2023)
- (Slovakia) Peter Hlinka (June – September 2023)
- (Slovakia) Marek Petruš (Sept. 2023 – March 2025)
- (Czech Republic) Jaroslav Hynek (March – August 2025)
- (Slovakia) Vladimír Cifranič (August 2025 - March 2026)
- (Slovakia) Jozef Kostelník (March 2026)
- (Slovakia) Erik Havrila (March 2026-Sep 2026)
- (Slovakia) Roman Pivarník (Sep 2026-)
