= 2026–27 2. Liga (Slovakia) =

2. Liga
- Season: 2026–27
- Dates: July 2026 – May 2027

The 2026–27 2. Liga will be 34th season of the 2. Liga in Slovakia, since its establishment in 1993.

== Teams ==
=== Team changes ===
Promoted from 2025–26 3. Liga	Relegated from 2025–26 Niké liga	Promoted to 2026–27 Niké liga	Relegated to 2026–27 3. Liga
Slovan Galanta (West); MFK Bytča (Central); FK Humenné (East)	Tatran Prešov	Dukla Banská Bystrica	Púchov; Slávia Košice; Stará Ľubovňa

=== Stadiums and locations ===
Location of teams in Slovak 2. Liga 2026–27

Teams in Bratislava
Petržalka
Inter Bratislava
Slovan Bratislava B

Team	Location	Stadium	Capacity
Liptovský Mikuláš	Liptovský Mikuláš	Stadium Liptovský Mikuláš	1,950
FC ŠTK 1914 Šamorín	Šamorín	Pomlé Stadium	1,950
MFK Bytča	Bytča	Futbalový štadión MFK Bytča	2,000
FC ViOn Zlaté Moravce	Zlaté Moravce	ViOn Aréna	4,006
FC Petržalka	Bratislava (Petržalka)	Štadión FC Petržalka	1,600
MŠK Žilina B	Žilina	Štadión pod Dubňom	11,258
FK Humenné	Humenné	Štadión Humenné	1,806
Považská Bystrica	Považská Bystrica	Štadión MŠK Považská Bystrica	2,500
Tatran Prešov	Prešov	Futbal Tatran Arena	6,334
FK Pohronie	Žiar nad Hronom	Mestský štadión Žiar nad Hronom	2,309
MFK Zvolen	Zvolen	MFK Lokomotíva Zvolen Stadium	1,870
OFK Baník Lehota pod Vtáčnikom	Lehota pod Vtáčnikom	Futbalový štadión OFK Baník Lehota pod Vtáčnikom	800
Slovan Bratislava U21	Bratislava (Nové Mesto)	Štadión Pasienky	11,591
FC Slovan Galanta	Galanta	Štadión FC Slovan Galanta	3,000
OFK Malženice	Malženice	OFK Dynamo Malženice Stadium	500
FK Inter Bratislava	Bratislava (Nové Mesto)	Štadión Pasienky	11,591

=== Personnel and kits ===
Note: Flags indicate national team as has been defined under FIFA eligibility rules. Players and Managers may hold more than one non-FIFA nationality.

Team	Head coach	Captain	Kit manufacturer	Shirt sponsor
MŠK Žilina B	(Slovakia) Peter Tomko	(Slovakia) Róbert Petruška	(United States) Nike	RADOMA
FC ViOn Zlate Moravce	(Slovakia) Peter Gaži	(Slovakia) Denis Duga	(Italy) Erreà	Tipsport
FC Petržalka	(Slovakia) Rastislav Urgela	(Slovakia) Lukáš Gašparovič	(Germany) Puma	None
FC ŠTK 1914 Šamorín	(Slovakia) Michal Kuruc	(Slovakia) Péter Varga	(Italy) Kappa	Slovnaft
MFK Bytča	(Slovakia) Stanislav Lojdl	(Slovakia) Daniel Hundák	(Spain) Joma	None
FK Humenné	(Slovakia) Patrik Durkáč	(Slovakia) Cyril Vasiľ	(Italy) Macron	Plynoservis Humenné
MŠK Považská Bystrica	(Slovakia) Martin Kuciak	(Slovakia) Dušan Kucharčík	(Denmark) Hummel	None
FC Tatran Prešov	(Slovakia) Roman Pivarník	(Slovakia) Patrik Šimko	(Germany) Adidas	None
FK Pohronie	(Slovakia) Róbert Jež	(Slovakia) Marek Kuzma	(Germany) Adidas	REMESLO
MFK Tatran Liptovský Mikuláš	(Slovakia) Marek Petruš	(Slovakia) Richard Bartoš	(Italy) Kappa	Tipsport; VEREX
Slovan Bratislava B	(Slovakia) Erik Grendel	(Slovakia) Maximilián Marko	(Germany) Adidas	Niké
MFK Zvolen	(Slovakia) Dušan Tóth	(Slovakia) Erik Gaško	(Italy) Macron	SAD Zvolen; Veolia
OFK Malženice	(Slovakia) Patrik Malý	(Argentina) Nicolás Gorosito	(Germany) Puma	Macho Color
OFK Baník Lehota pod Vtáčnikom	(Slovakia) Richard Slezák	(Zimbabwe) Mbekezeli Sibanda	(Denmark) Hummel	None
FK Inter Bratislava	(Slovakia) Vladimír Cifranič	(Slovakia) Lukas Remen	(Italy) Erreà	Niké
Slovan Galanta	(Slovakia) Mikuláš Radványi	(Slovakia) Tomáš Horák	(Italy) Macron	None

=== Managerial changes ===
Team	Outgoing manager	Manner of departure	Date of vacancy	Position in table	Incoming manager	Date of appointment
Zlate Moravce	(Czech Republic) Jiří Vágner	End of contract	14 May 2026	Preseason	(Slovakia) Peter Gaži	31 May 2026
Pohronie	(Slovakia) Erik Grendel	Signed by Slovan Bratislava B	18 May 2026	Preseason	(Slovakia) Pavol Gregora	6 June 2026
Slovan Bratislava B	(Slovakia) Vladimír Gála	End of contract	21 May 2026	Preseason	(Slovakia) Erik Grendel	11 June 2026
Inter Bratislava	(Slovakia) Marián Šarmír	End of contract	30 June 2026	Preseason	(Slovakia) Vladimír Cifranič	1 July 2026
Žilina B	(Slovakia) Viktor Pečovský	End of contract	30 June 2026	Preseason	(Slovakia) Peter Tomko	1 July 2026
Slovan Galanta	(Slovakia) Michal Hipp	Mutual consent	3 July 2026	Preseason	(Slovakia) Mikuláš Radványi	4 July 2026
Tatran Prešov	(Slovakia) Erik Havrile	Sacked	30 August 2026	7th	(Slovakia) Roman Pivarník	1 September 2026
Humenné	(Slovakia) Miroslav Nemec	Resigned	3 September 2026	12th	(Slovakia) Peter Barnišin (caretaker)	3 September 2026
Humenné	(Slovakia) Peter Barnišin (caretaker)	End of tenure as caretaker	7 September 2026	13th	(Slovakia) Patrik Durkáč	7 September 2026
Pohronie	(Slovakia) Pavol Gregora	Signed by Komárno	19 October 2026	3rd	(Slovakia) Róbert Jež (caretaker)	19 October 2026
Pohronie	(Slovakia) Róbert Jež (caretaker)	End of tenure as caretaker	13 November 2026	5th	(Slovakia) Miloš Targoš	13 November 2026

== League table ==
Pos	Team	Pld	W	D	L	GF	GA	GD	Pts	Promotion, qualification or relegation
1	Šamorín	17	12	3	2	36	20	+16	39	Promotion to Niké liga
2	Petržalka	17	11	3	3	27	13	+14	36	Qualification to Promotion play-offs
3	Považská Bystrica	17	10	2	5	34	27	+7	32	
4	Tatran Prešov	17	9	4	4	26	19	+7	31	
5	Inter Bratislava	17	7	6	4	37	23	+14	27	
6	Galanta	17	8	3	6	29	28	+1	27	
7	Pohronie	17	8	3	6	28	24	+4	27	
8	Liptovský Mikuláš	17	7	5	5	27	19	+8	26	
9	Žilina B	17	7	3	7	22	21	+1	24	Ineligible for promotion as a reserve side
10	Slovan Bratislava B	17	6	6	5	25	20	+5	24	Ineligible for promotion as a reserve side
11	Lehota p. Vtáčnikom	17	6	5	6	25	29	−4	23	
12	Malženice	17	4	4	9	24	30	−6	16	
13	Zlaté Moravce	17	3	6	8	16	22	−6	15	
14	Humenné	17	3	4	10	15	30	−15	13	Relegation to 3. Liga
15	Zvolen	17	2	3	12	16	30	−14	9	Relegation to 3. Liga
16	Bytča	17	3	0	14	15	47	−32	9	Relegation to 3. Liga

Updated to match(es) played on 16 November 2026. Source: sportnet.sme.sk/futbalnet (in Slovak)
Rules for classification: 1) Points; 2) Goal difference; 3) Goals scored; 4) Head-to-head; 5) Play-off.

== Results ==
Each team plays home-and-away against every other team in the league, for a total of 30 matches each.

Home \ Away	FCT	INT	LMI	LEH	MAL	PET	POH	PBY	BYT	SLO	HUM	ZVO	ŠAM	ZLA	ŽIL
Tatran Prešov		2–1	1–1	3–2							1–0	1–0	0–1	0–1	1–1
Inter Bratislava				2–3		4–0		3–1				1–1	2–2	2–2	0–1
Liptovský Mikuláš		3–3		1–0					4–0			2–2	2–0	0–0	3–2
Lehota p. Vtáčnikom					1–1	1–0	3–3			2–2	1–0	1–0		2–2	1–0
Malženice	0–1	2–5	1–2					1–2	3–1	4–2			3–5	3–0	
Petržalka	4–2		2–0		1–1		1–0	0–1	4–0	1–1					2–1
Pohronie	3–1	0–3	2–0	5–1	0–0			2–1	3–1	1–1					
Považská Bystrica	2–2	3–1	2–1	2–1			4–0		4–1		2–1		1–4	2–1	
Bytča	0–3	0–3	0–5	2–1		1–2					4–1		1–2	2–1	1–2
Slovan Bratislava B	2–2	2–2	2–0		2–0			1–1	2–0		3–0		1–2	0–1	
Humenné	1–2	1–1	1–0		2–2	0–1	0–2					1–0	1–4	2–1	
Zvolen	0–1				1–2	0–1	1–2	2–1	5–0	0–2					
Šamorín				0–2	2–0	1–1	2–1				3–1	3–1			2–1
Zlaté Moravce				2–2		0–2	1–3			0–1		4–0	0–0		0–0
Žilina B		0–1			2–1	0–2	2–1	4–2		2–0		2–1			

Updated to match(es) played on 16 November 2026. Source: Futbalnet
Legend: Blue = home team win; Yellow = draw; Red = away team win.

== Season statistics ==
As of 16 November 2026

=== Top goalscorers ===
Rank	Player	Club	Goals
1	(Slovakia) Marek Kuzma	Pohronie	8
1	(Nigeria) Onyebuchi Ihejirika	Šamorín	8
2	(Slovakia) Jakub Michlík	Pohronie	7
2	(Slovakia) Adrián Káčerík	Považská Bystrica	7
2	(Slovakia) Matej Franko	Tatran Prešov	7
2	(Slovakia) Martin Regáli	Tatran Prešov	7
2	(Czech Republic) Daniel Suchý	Tatran Prešov	7
3	(Slovakia) Adam Horvát	Lehota p. Vtáčnikom	6
3	(Slovakia) Adrián Mojžiš	Malženice	6
3	(Slovakia) Rudolf Božik	Považská Bystrica	6
3	(Slovakia) Vladimír Bajtoš	Šamorín	6

=== Most assists ===
Rank	Player	Club	Assists
1	(Slovakia) Adrián Káčerík	Považská Bystrica	8
1	(Slovakia) Giuliano Antonio Marek	Šamorín	8
1	(Slovakia) Martin Regáli	Tatran Prešov	8
2	(Slovakia) Tomáš Vantruba	Inter Bratislava	6
2	(Slovakia) Ľuboslav Laura	Liptovský Mikuláš	6
2	(Slovakia) Viktor Sliacky	Petržalka	6
2	(Nigeria) Onyebuchi Ihejirika	Šamorín	6
3	(Austria) Emilian Metu	Inter Bratislava	5
3	(Slovakia) Tomáš Staš	Liptovský Mikuláš	5
3	(Slovakia) Lukáš Gašparovič	Petržalka	5
3	(The Gambia) Sanna Jobe	Pohronie	5
3	(Slovakia) Marek Kuzma	Pohronie	5
3	(Slovakia) Marián Weber	Šamorín	5
3	(Slovakia) Tobiáš Gabriš	Slovan Bratislava B	5
3	(Slovakia) Jakub Murko	Slovan Bratislava B	5

=== Hat-tricks ===
Player	For	Against	Result	Date	Round
(Slovakia) Matej Franko	Tatran Prešov	Lehota p. Vtáčnikom	3–2 (H)	3 October 2026	11
(Slovakia) Marek Kuzma	Pohronie	Lehota p. Vtáčnikom	5–1 (H)	6 November 2026	16
(Nigeria) Onyebuchi Ihejirika^{4}	Šamorín	Malženice	5–3 (A)	7 November 2026	16

(H) – Home; (A) – Away

Note: ^{4} – player scored 4 goals

=== Clean sheets ===
Rank	Player	Club	Clean sheets
1	(Slovakia) Andrej Mikoláš	Petržalka	8
2	(Slovakia) Adrián Slančík	Liptovský Mikuláš	6
2	(Slovakia) Adrián Knurovský	Tatran Prešov	6
2	(Slovakia) Patrik Vasiľ	Zlate Moravce	6
3	(Slovakia) Peter Znamenák	Lehota p. Vtáčnikom	5
4	(Slovakia) Matúš Macík	Slovan Bratislava B	4
4	(Slovakia) Tamás Tarcsi	Žilina B	4
5	(Slovakia) Miloslav Bréda	Humenné	3
5	(Slovakia) Peter Sokol	Inter Bratislava	3
5	(Slovakia) Michal Šulla	Inter Bratislava	3
5	(Slovakia) Alex Húdok	Šamorín	3
5	(Slovakia) Maxim Adam Amrich	Slovan Galanta	3

=== Discipline ===
==== Player ====
- Most yellow cards: 9
  - (The Gambia) Yusupha Kambi (Lehota p. Vtáčnikom)
- Most red cards: 2
  - (El Salvador) Kiano Falcao (Bytca)
  - (Nigeria) Emmanuel Okonji (Liptovský Mikuláš)
  - (Slovakia) Alexander Veľký (Slovan Bratislava B)

==== Club ====
- Most yellow cards: 50
  - Šamorín
- Most red cards: 7
  - Hummené

== See also ==
- 2026–27 Slovak Cup
- 2026–27 Slovak First Football League
- List of Slovak football transfers summer 2026
- List of Slovak football transfers winter 2026–27
- List of foreign Slovak First League players
