= 2024–25 2. Liga (Slovakia) =

2. Liga
- Season: 2024–25
- Dates: 26 July 2024 – 16 May 2025
- Champions: Tatran Prešov (3rd title)
- Promoted: Tatran Prešov
- Relegated: Humenné
- Matches: 101
- Goals: 270 (2.67 per match)
- Top goalscorer: Landing Sagna (12 goals)

The 2024–25 2. Liga was the 32nd season of the 2. Liga in Slovakia, since its establishment in 1993.

== Teams ==
=== Team changes ===
Promoted from 2023–24 3. Liga	Relegated from 2023–24 Niké liga	Promoted to 2024–25 Niké liga	Withdrew from league before 2024–25 season	Relegated to 2024–25 3. Liga
MFK Zvolen; Redfox FC Stará Ľubovňa	Zlaté Moravce	Komárno	Myjava; Trebišov	Dolný Kubín; Spišská Nová Ves

=== Stadiums and locations ===
Location of teams in Slovak 2. liga 2024–25

Team	Location	Stadium	Capacity
Liptovský Mikuláš	Liptovský Mikuláš	Stadium Liptovský Mikuláš	1,950
FC ŠTK 1914 Šamorín	Šamorín	Pomlé Stadium	1,950
MŠK Púchov	Púchov	Mestský štadión Púchov	6,614
FC ViOn Zlaté Moravce	Zlaté Moravce	ViOn Aréna	4,006
FC Petržalka	Bratislava (Petržalka)	Štadión FC Petržalka	1,600
MŠK Žilina B	Žilina	Štadión pod Dubňom	11,258
Humenné	Humenné	Štadión Humenné	1,806
Považská Bystrica	Považská Bystrica	Štadión MŠK Považská Bystrica	2,500
1. FC Tatran Prešov	Prešov	Štadión MŠK Tesla Stropkov	2,500
FK Pohronie	Žiar nad Hronom	Mestský štadión Žiar nad Hronom	2,309
MFK Zvolen	Zvolen	MFK Lokomotíva Zvolen Stadium	1,870
Slovan Bratislava U21	Bratislava (Nové Mesto)	Štadión Pasienky	11,401
Redfox FC Stará Ľubovňa	Stará Ľubovňa	Štadión Stará Ľubovňa	2,500
OFK Malženice	Malženice	OFK Dynamo Malženice Stadium	500

=== Personnel and kits ===
Note: Flags indicate national team as has been defined under FIFA eligibility rules. Players and Managers may hold more than one non-FIFA nationality.

Team	Head coach	Captain	Kit manufacturer	Shirt sponsor
MŠK Žilina B	(Slovakia) Vladimír Veselý	(Slovakia) Dominik Šnajder	(United States) Nike	Preto
FC ViOn Zlate Moravce	(Slovakia) Roman Hudec	(Slovakia) Lukáš Greššák	(Italy) Erreà	Tipsport
FC Petržalka	(Slovakia) Michal Kuruc	(Slovakia) Filip Oršula	(Italy) Erreà	PORTUM Towers
FC ŠTK 1914 Šamorín	(Estonia) Vladimir Vassiljev	(Slovakia) Draško Marič-Bjekič	(Italy) Kappa	Slovnaft
MŠK Púchov	(Slovakia) Marián Zimen	(Slovakia) Matej Loduha	(Netherlands) Masita	reinoo
FK Humenné	(Slovakia) Jozef Škrlík	(Slovakia) Erik Streňo	(Slovakia) Atak	Triada
MŠK Považská Bystrica	(Slovakia) Peter Jakuš	(Slovakia) Anton Sloboda	(Denmark) Hummel	
FC Tatran Prešov	(Czech Republic) Jaroslav Hynek	(Slovakia) Patrik Šimko	(Germany) Adidas	Niké
FK Pohronie	(Slovakia) Matej Čobik Ferčik	(Slovakia) Dominik Straňák	(Germany) Adidas	REMESLO
MFK Tatran Liptovský Mikuláš	(Slovakia) Ľubomír Reiter	(Slovakia) Richard Bartoš	(Italy) Kappa	VEREX
Slovan Bratislava U21	(Slovakia) Vladimír Gála	(Slovakia) Samuel Habodasz	(Germany) Adidas	Niké
MFK Zvolen	(Slovakia) Dušan Tóth	(Slovakia) Gabriel Snitka	(Italy) Macron	SAD Zvolen
Redfox FC Stará Ľubovňa	(Slovakia) Jozef Kostelník	(Slovakia) Kamil Karaš	(Italy) Legea	bilionbuy.com
OFK Malženice	(Slovakia) Pavol Bartoš	(Slovakia) Matej Rehák	(Spain) Joma	Macho color

== League table ==
Pos	Team	Pld	W	D	L	GF	GA	GD	Pts	Promotion, qualification or relegation
1	Tatran Prešov (C, P)	26	20	3	3	51	19	+32	63	Promotion to Niké liga
2	Zlaté Moravce	26	16	4	6	41	18	+23	52	Qualification to Promotion play-offs
3	Liptovský Mikuláš	26	13	7	6	45	29	+16	46	
4	Považská Bystrica	26	13	5	8	42	35	+7	44	
5	Púchov	26	11	6	9	42	36	+6	39	
6	Petržalka	26	10	7	9	32	26	+6	37	
7	Malženice	26	10	4	12	33	40	−7	34	
8	Zvolen	26	10	4	12	30	41	−11	34	
9	Žilina B	26	9	4	13	32	39	−7	31	Ineligible for promotion as a reserve side
10	Šamorín	26	9	3	14	29	40	−11	30	
11	Slovan Bratislava B	26	8	4	14	33	43	−10	28	Ineligible for promotion as a reserve side
12	Pohronie	26	7	5	14	35	54	−19	26	
13	Stará Ľubovňa	26	6	6	14	24	30	−6	24	
14	Humenné (R)	26	5	8	13	20	39	−19	23	Relegation to 3. Liga

Source: Futbalnet (in Slovak)
Rules for classification: 1) Points; 2) Head-to-head points; 3) Head-to-head goal difference; 4) Head-to-head away goals scored; 5) Play-off.
(C) Champions; (P) Promoted; (R) Relegated

== Results ==
Each team plays home-and-away against every other team in the league, for a total of 30 matches each.

Home \ Away	HUM	LMI	MAL	PET	POH	PBY	PÚC	SLO	STA	PRE	ZLA	ZVO	ŠAM	ŽIL
Humenné		1–1	0–2	1–1	1–0	1–0	2–2	2–0	0–1	0–1	0–1	1–2	1–1	2–0
Liptovský Mikuláš	3–0		4–1	1–1	3–0 (Note: Match awarded.)	1–0	2–0	2–1	2–0	1–2	1–0	1–1	3–1	1–3
Malženice	2–1	1–4		1–0	2–2	0–2	2–1	2–0	2–0	2–1	1–5	4–0	2–1	0–1
Petržalka	2–1	0–1	0–0		4–0	1–1	1–2	1–2	1–0	1–0	0–1	2–0	1–2	1–0
Pohronie	1–1	2–2	2–0	2–5		1–2	0–0	3–2	2–1	3–5	2–0	0–3	3–1	3–2
Považská Bystrica	3–1	2–1	3–1	3–1	3–1		4–0	1–3	2–1	0–1	1–1	3–1	4–3	0–4
Púchov	5–0	2–2	1–3	3–1	2–0	1–1		2–1	1–0	0–1	0–1	3–2	3–1	3–0
Slovan Bratislava B	1–1	0–1	2–2	1–1	2–1	2–0	3–2		2–1	0–1	0–1	1–3	0–2	3–2
Stará Ľubovňa	0–0	2–2	2–0	0–0	2–3	1–1	0–3	2–2		2–1	0–2	3–0	0–1	3–0
Tatran Prešov	3–0	1–0	2–1	1–1	2–1	3–1	3–0	4–1	1–0		1–1	3–0	3–0	2–0
Zlaté Moravce	4–0	2–1	1–1	2–0	1–0	3–1	1–2	3–1	1–0	2–2		0–1	1–2	4–0
Zvolen	2–1	3–1	3–1	0–3	3–3	0–1	1–1	1–0	0–3	0–1	1–0		1–0	1–2
Šamorín	1–2	1–1	1–0	1–2	2–0	0–1	1–1	0–2	1–0	1–2	0–2	3–1		2–1
Žilina B	0–0	2–3	1–0	0–1	3–0	2–2	3–2	2–1	0–0	1–4	0–1	0–0	3–0	

Source: Futbalnet (in Slovak)
Legend: Blue = home team win; Yellow = draw; Red = away team win.

== Season statistics ==
As of 18 May 2025

=== Top goalscorers ===
Rank	Player	Club	Goals
1	(Senegal) Landing Sagna	Prešov	12
2	(Slovakia) Richard Bartoš	L.Mikuláš	10
3	(Slovakia) Lukáš Prokop	Žilina B	9
3	(Georgia (country)) Levan Nonikashvili	Zlaté Moravce	9
3	(Slovakia) Daniel Rapavý	Púchov	9
3	(Slovakia) Marek Švec	Petržalka(1)/Slovan(8)	9
7	(Slovakia) Martin Regáli	Prešov	8
7	(Slovakia) Marek Kuzma	Zlaté Moravce	8
9	(Slovakia) Boris Druga	Malženice	7
9	(Slovakia) Timotej Kudlička	Malženice	7
9	(Slovakia) Filip Balaj	Zlaté Moravce	7
9	(Slovakia) Viktor Úradník	Zvolen	7
9	(Slovakia) Dušan Kucharčík	P.Bystrica	7
9	(Slovakia) Mário Boris	P.Bystrica	7
9	(Slovakia) Adrián Kopičár	Púchov	7
9	(The Gambia) Ousman Kujabi	Pohronie	7

=== Clean sheets ===
Rank	Player	Club	Clean sheets
1	(Slovakia) Adrián Knurovský	Prešov	12
2	(Slovakia) Patrik Richter	Vion Z.Moravce	8
3	(Ukraine) Maksym Kuchynskyi	L.Mikuláš	7
4	(Czech Republic) Pavel Halouska	Petržalka	6
4	(Slovakia) Miloslav Bréda	Humenné	6
4	(Slovakia) Patrik Vasiľ	Malženice	6
4	(Slovakia) Samuel Vavrúš	Púchov	6
4	(Slovakia) Adam Krejčí	Zvolen	6
9	(Nigeria) Mathew Yakubu	Stará Ľubovňa	4
9	(Slovakia) Adrián Slančík	Stará Ľubovňa	4
9	(Slovakia) Samuel Belaník	Žilina B	4

=== Discipline ===
As of 1 Dec 2024

==== Player ====
- Most yellow cards: 7
  - (Slovakia) Ján Nosko (Zvolen)
  - (Slovakia) Roman Zemko (P.Bystrica)
- Most red cards: 2
  - (Slovakia) Timotej Kudlička (Malženice)

==== Club ====
- Most yellow cards: 51
  - Šamorín
- Most red cards: 10
  - Púchov
  - Malženice

== See also ==
- 2024–25 Slovak Cup
- 2024–25 Slovak First Football League
- List of Slovak football transfers summer 2024
- List of Slovak football transfers winter 2024–25
- List of foreign Slovak First League players
