= 2025–26 2. Liga (Slovakia) =

2. Liga
- Season: 2025–26
- Dates: 26 July 2024 – 16 May 2025
- Champions: Banská Bystrica
- Promoted: Banská Bystrica
- Relegated: Púchov; Slávia Košice; Stará Ľubovňa
- Matches: 168
- Goals: 499 (2.97 per match)
- Top goalscorer: Jakub Sylvestr (22)

The 2025–26 2. Liga was the 33rd season of the 2. Liga in Slovakia, since its establishment in 1993.

== Teams ==
=== Team changes ===
Promoted from 2024–25 3. Liga	Relegated from 2024–25 Niké liga	Promoted to 2025–26 Niké liga	Relegated to 2025–26 3. Liga
Lehota pod Vtáčnikom; Slávia TU Košice; Inter Bratislava	Dukla Banská Bystrica	Tatran Prešov	Humenné

=== Stadiums and locations ===
Location of teams in Slovak 2. liga 2025–26

Team	Location	Stadium	Capacity
Liptovský Mikuláš	Liptovský Mikuláš	Stadium Liptovský Mikuláš	1,950
FC ŠTK 1914 Šamorín	Šamorín	Pomlé Stadium	1,950
MŠK Púchov	Púchov	Mestský štadión Púchov	6,614
FC ViOn Zlaté Moravce	Zlaté Moravce	ViOn Aréna	4,006
FC Petržalka	Bratislava (Petržalka)	Štadión FC Petržalka	1,600
MŠK Žilina B	Žilina	Štadión pod Dubňom	11,258
Slávia TU Košice	Košice	Štadión TU Watsonova	1,000
Považská Bystrica	Považská Bystrica	Štadión MŠK Považská Bystrica	2,500
MFK Dukla Banská Bystrica	Banská Bystrica	Národný Atletický Štadión	7,381
FK Pohronie	Žiar nad Hronom	Mestský štadión Žiar nad Hronom	2,309
MFK Zvolen	Zvolen	MFK Lokomotíva Zvolen Stadium	1,870
OFK Baník Lehota pod Vtáčnikom	Lehota pod Vtáčnikom	Futbalový štadión OFK Baník Lehota pod Vtáčnikom	800
Slovan Bratislava U21	Bratislava (Nové Mesto)	Štadión Pasienky	11,591
Redfox FC Stará Ľubovňa	Stará Ľubovňa	Štadión Stará Ľubovňa	2,500
OFK Malženice	Malženice	OFK Dynamo Malženice Stadium	500
FK Inter Bratislava	Bratislava (Nové Mesto)	Štadión Pasienky	11,591

=== Personnel and kits ===
Note: Flags indicate national team as has been defined under FIFA eligibility rules. Players and Managers may hold more than one non-FIFA nationality.

Team	Head coach	Captain	Kit manufacturer	Shirt sponsor
MŠK Žilina B	(Slovakia) Vladimír Veselý	(Slovakia) Adam Oravec	(United States) Nike	Preto
FC ViOn Zlate Moravce	(Czech Republic) Jiří Vágner	(Slovakia) Marek Kuzma	(Italy) Erreà	Tipsport
FC Petržalka	(Slovakia) Rastislav Urgela	(Slovakia) Lukáš Gašparovič	(Italy) Erreà	PORTUM Towers
FC ŠTK 1914 Šamorín	(Slovakia) Martin Stopka	(Czech Republic) Filip Raska	(Italy) Kappa	Slovnaft
MŠK Púchov	(Slovakia) Ivan Belák	(Slovakia) Patrik Mráz	(Netherlands) Masita	reinoo
Slávia TU Košice	(Slovakia) Matej Timkovič	(Slovakia) Mojmír Trebuňák	(Germany) Adidas	TU Košice
MŠK Považská Bystrica	(Slovakia) Peter Jakuš	(Slovakia) Anton Sloboda	(Denmark) Hummel	
MFK Dukla Banská Bystrica	(Slovakia) Juraj Jarábek	(Slovakia) Ľubomír Willwéber	(Germany) Adidas	Veolia
FK Pohronie	(Slovakia) Erik Grendel	(Slovakia) Martin Dobrotka	(Germany) Adidas	REMESLO
MFK Tatran Liptovský Mikuláš	(Slovakia) Marek Petruš	(Slovakia) Richard Bartoš	(Italy) Kappa	VEREX
Slovan Bratislava U21	(Slovakia) Vladimír Gála	(Slovakia) Samuel Habodasz	(Germany) Adidas	Niké
MFK Zvolen	(Slovakia) Dušan Tóth	(Slovakia) Gabriel Snitka	(Italy) Macron	SAD Zvolen
Redfox FC Stará Ľubovňa	(Poland) Piotr Kapusta	(Slovakia) Ervin Matta	(Italy) Legea	bilionbuy.com
OFK Malženice	(Slovakia) Pavol Bartoš	(Slovakia) Jakub Krajcovic	(Spain) Joma	Macho color
OFK Baník Lehota pod Vtáčnikom	(Slovakia) Dušan Oravec	(Slovakia) Marián Štrbák	(Denmark) Hummel	TBD
FK Inter Bratislava	(Slovakia) Marián Šarmír	(Slovakia) Lukas Remen	(Slovakia) Elvésport	Niké

== League table ==
Pos	Team	Pld	W	D	L	GF	GA	GD	Pts	Promotion, qualification or relegation
1	Banská Bystrica (C, P)	30	20	6	4	61	25	+36	66	Promotion to Niké liga
2	Zvolen	30	13	10	7	46	36	+10	49	Qualification to Promotion play-offs
3	Liptovský Mikuláš	30	13	9	8	55	47	+8	48	
4	Petržalka	30	14	6	10	45	31	+14	48	
5	Malženice	30	13	8	9	44	38	+6	47	
6	Pohronie	30	11	11	8	47	35	+12	44	
7	Zlaté Moravce	30	12	8	10	57	49	+8	44	
8	Inter Bratislava	30	12	6	12	35	36	−1	42	
9	Slovan Bratislava B	30	10	10	10	45	48	−3	40	Ineligible for promotion as a reserve side
10	Šamorín	30	10	8	12	44	46	−2	38	
11	Lehota p. Vtáčnikom	30	9	8	13	41	52	−11	35	
12	Považská Bystrica	30	8	9	13	38	49	−11	33	
13	Žilina B	30	9	6	15	43	59	−16	33	Ineligible for promotion as a reserve side
14	Slávia Košice (R)	30	8	8	14	38	54	−16	32	Relegation to 3. Liga
15	Púchov (R)	30	6	11	13	33	50	−17	29	Relegation to 3. Liga
16	Stará Ľubovňa (R)	30	6	8	16	35	52	−17	26	Relegation to 3. Liga

Source: sportnet.sme.sk/futbalnet (in Slovak)
Rules for classification: 1) Points; 2) Head-to-head points; 3) Head-to-head goal difference; 4) Head-to-head away goals scored; 5) Play-off.
(C) Champions; (P) Promoted; (R) Relegated

== Results ==
Each team plays home-and-away against every other team in the league, for a total of 30 matches each.

Home \ Away	DBB	INT	MAL	LEH	LMI	PBY	PET	POH	PÚC	ŠAM	SLA	SLO	STA	ZLA	ŽIL	ZVO
Banská Bystrica		2–0			4–3		1–0	1–1		3–1	2–0	1–0		4–1		1–1
Inter Bratislava			2–1	2–2	2–2	1–1			0–0		3–1		4–1	1–2	1–0	
Malženice	0–3			2–1	1–2			0–0	3–1			3–0	2–1		2–1	
Lehota p. Vtáčnikom	1–2				2–2	2–1	1–0	4–3		2–1	3–1	2–3				1–5
Liptovský Mikuláš		2–1		2–0			4–2	0–3		2–1		2–1		1–1		0–1
Považská Bystrica	0–1		1–3	2–1			2–1						2–0		1–1	
Petržalka		0–1	3–1						4–0		2–3	1–0	1–0	3–2	1–1	
Pohronie		1–0	0–0			4–0	1–2				4–1		3–1	3–1	4–1	2–2
Púchov	1–4		4–2					3–1		2–3		1–1				0–1
Šamorín		2–0	1–0			0–2	1–1	1–1			2–1			3–3	2–3	
Slávia Košice	0–1		2–2							2–1		2–2			1–3	1–0
Slovan Bratislava B		0–1				2–4	0–0	2–2	1–1	1–4				2–1		2–0
Stará Ľubovňa	0–2			0–0	1–1			2–0	1–0	2–0	1–1	7–0			0–1	1–2
Zlaté Moravce	2–2	3–0	4–3	1–1		5–1			2–1		1–1		3–2		3–1	
Žilina B	0–4			3–2	1–0				5–2	5–4		0–1	0–2			1–3
Zvolen		1–1	3–1			0–1	3–2	1–0		1–3	1–3		2–2			

Updated to match(es) played on 21 November 2025. Source: Futbalnet
Legend: Blue = home team win; Yellow = draw; Red = away team win.

== Season statistics ==
As of 18 May 2026

=== Top goalscorers ===
Rank	Player	Club	Goals
1	(Slovakia) Jakub Sylvestr	Zvolen	22
2	(Slovakia) Alexej Maroš	Slovan 21	14
3	(Slovakia) Matej Franko	L.Mikuláš	13
4	(Slovakia) Tobiáš Diviš	Pohronie	11
4	(Democratic Republic of the Congo) Herve Hiba	Slavia TU	11
6	(Slovakia) Jozef Špyrka	Pohronie	10
6	(Slovakia) Richard Bartoš	L.Mikuláš	10
6	(Slovakia) Filip Balaj	Zlaté Moravce	10
9	(Slovakia) Tibor Slebodník	Dukla B.Bystrica	9
9	(The Gambia) Modou Lamin Marong	Šamorín	9
9	(Ghana) Frank Appiah	FC Petržalka	9

=== Clean sheets ===
Rank	Player	Club	Clean sheets
1	(Slovakia) Andrej Mikoláš	Malženice	10
1	(Czech Republic) Pavel Halouska	Petržalka	10
3	(Slovakia) Samuel Vavriš	Púchov	9
4	(Nigeria) Mathew Yakubu	B.Bystria	8
5	(Slovakia) Adam Krejčí	Zvolen	7
5	(Slovakia) Michal Šulla	Inter Bratislava	7
7	(Slovakia) Adrián Slančík	Stará Ľubovňa	5
7	(Slovakia) Marek Teplan	P.Bystrica	5
7	(Slovakia) Martin Leško	Slavia TU	5
7	(Slovakia) Lukáš Domaniský	Pohronie	5
7	(Slovakia) Peter Znamenák	Lehota	5

=== Discipline ===
As of 17 May 2026

==== Player ====
- Most yellow cards: 12
  - (Slovenia) Miha Breznik (Malženice)
- Most red cards: 3
  - (Ghana) Manuel Aviela Yendare (Žilina B)

==== Club ====
- Most yellow cards: 90
  - Pohronie
- Most red cards: 7
  - Žilina B

== See also ==
- 2025–26 Slovak Cup
- 2025–26 Slovak First Football League
- List of Slovak football transfers summer 2025
- List of Slovak football transfers winter 2025–26
- List of foreign Slovak First League players
