= Andrej Mikoláš =

Slovak footballer (born 2004)

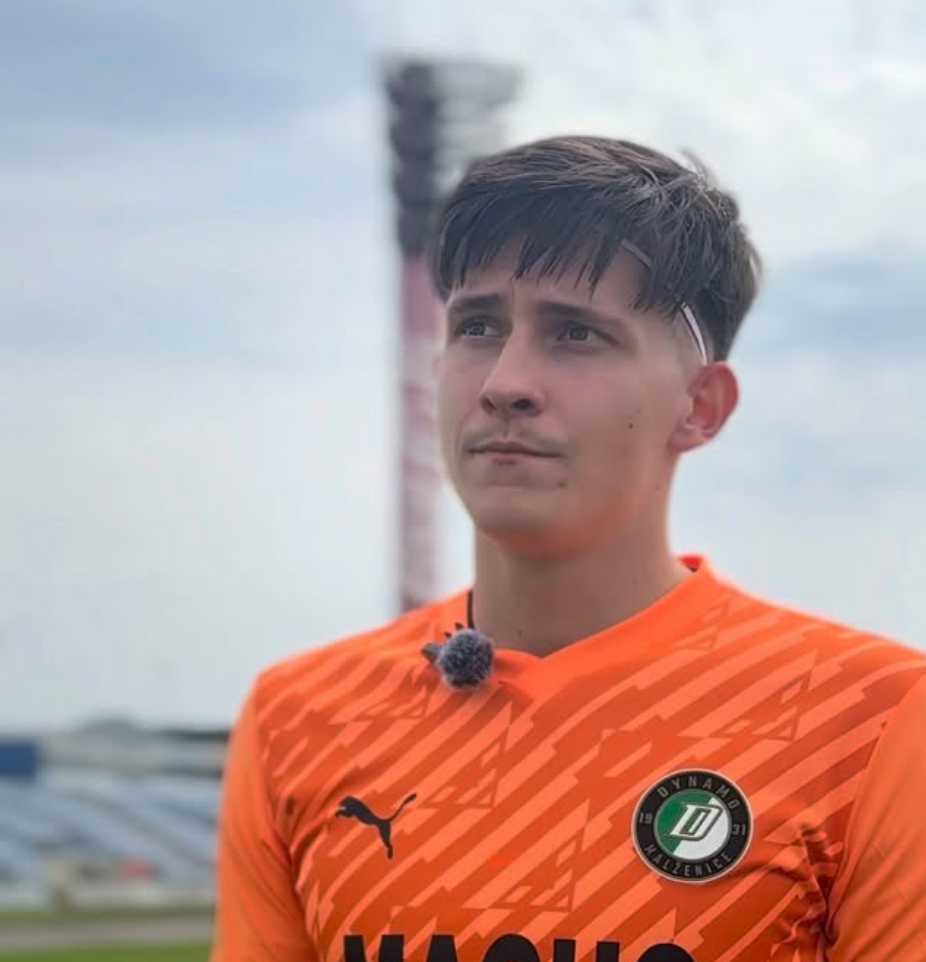
- Mikoláš with Dynamo Malženice in 2026

Personal information
- Date of birth: 11 August 2004 (age 22)
- Place of birth: Bratislava, Slovakia
- Height: 1.88 m (6 ft 2 in)
- Position: Goalkeeper

Team information
- Current team: Dynamo Malženice
- Number: 1

Youth career
- Slovan Bratislava

Senior career*
Years	Team	Apps	(Gls)
2023–2025	Slovan Bratislava B	8	(0)
2025–	Dynamo Malženice	27	(0)
- * Club domestic league appearances and goals as of 10:07, 22 May 2026 (UTC)

Andrej Mikoláš (born 11 August 2004) is a Slovak professional footballer who plays for 2. Liga club OFK Dynamo Malženice as a goalkeeper. He started his career at FC Ružinov Bratislava before joining Slovan Bratislava's academy at 13, playing for their reserve team. In July 2025, he signed with OFK Dynamo Malženice, keeping with a clean sheet on his debut.

== Early life ==
Mikoláš started his football career at local club FC Ružinov Bratislava before transferring to the academy of Slovan Bratislava at the age of 13. He gradually moved up to the reserve team, for which he kept five matches in the 2023–24 season and three in the next. Around this time he also enrolled into the Slovak Police Academy.

== Club career ==
=== Dynamo Malženice ===
Following the expiration of his contract with Slovan B, Mikoláš joined fellow league side OFK Dynamo Malženice in July 2025. He made his debut in a 0–0 draw against FK Pohronie, keeping a clean sheet. Between March and mid-April, he kept five clean sheets in 6 games, only conceding one goal in a 3–1 win against eventually league winners MFK Dukla Banská Bystrica. In his first season with Malženice, Mikoláš played a total of 27 games, keeping 10 clean sheets, the joint most in the league alongside Pavel Halouska.

== Career statistics ==
Appearances and goals by club, season and competition
Club	Season	League			Slovak Cup		Europe		Total	
Club	Season	Division	Apps	Goals	Apps	Goals	Apps	Goals	Apps	Goals
ŠK Slovan Bratislava B	2023–24	2. Liga	3	0	—		—		3	0
ŠK Slovan Bratislava B	2024–25	2. Liga	5	0	—		—		5	0
ŠK Slovan Bratislava B	Total		8	0	—		—		8	0
Dynamo Malženice	2025–26	2. Liga	27	0	—		—		27	0
Career total			35	0	—		—		35	0
