= Peter Hluško =

Slovak footballer

Personal information
- Date of birth: 22 December 1970 (age 55)
- Height: 1.78 m (5 ft 10 in)
- Position: Defender

Senior career*
Years	Team	Apps	(Gls)
- Sparta Považská Bystrica
1992–1996	1. FC Tatran Prešov		
1996–2001	MŠK Žilina		
2001–2003	FC Spartak Trnava		
- * Club domestic league appearances and goals

Peter Hluško (born 22 December 1970) is a retired Slovak football defender.
