= Herve Hiba =

Congolese footballer (born 2001)

Personal information
- Date of birth: 3 February 2001 (age 25)
- Place of birth: DR Congo
- Position: Centre-forward

Team information
- Current team: Slávia TU Košice
- Number: 10

Senior career*
Years	Team	Apps	(Gls)
–2024	JAC Tresor		
2024	Tatra Sokolany		
2025	OK Častkovce		
2025–	Slávia TU Košice	14	(11)
- * Club domestic league appearances and goals as of 25 May 2026

Herve Koke Hiba (born 3 February 2001) is a Congolese professional footballer who plays as a centre-forward for 3. Liga club Slávia TU Košice.

== Club career ==
=== Slávia TU Košice ===
In 2025, Hiba transferred to newly promoted 2. Liga club Slávia TU Košice from 3. Liga side OK Častkovce. He missed the first three matches due to injuries. He debuted for Košice in a 1–1 draw against Stará Ľubovňa FC. He scored his first goal in a 1–0 win against MFK Zvolen, converting his chance in the 78th minute. He scored a brace against ŠK Slovan Bratislava B on 23 September 2025, converting his sixth goal in his last four matches and, with an average of 1.45 goals per match, becoming the most effective player in the division. In the first half of the season, he made 13 appearances, scoring 11 goals and becoming the club's top goal scorer, and the leagues second highest. In the winter transfer window, it was reported that first league clubs FC Košice, Zemplín Michalovce, and Železiarne Podbrezová were interested in signing him. Hiba would not go on to make any more appearances for the rest of the season due to his residence permit expiring, having to go back to DR Congo to solve the issue.
