= Jakub Straka =

Slovak footballer

Personal information
- Full name: Jakub Straka
- Date of birth: 17 June 1997 (age 29)
- Place of birth: Vranov nad Topľou, Slovakia
- Height: 1.77 m (5 ft 10 in)
- Positions: Left-back; left midfielder

Team information
- Current team: FK Humenné

Youth career
- –2015: FK Soľ
- 2012–2015: → Michalovce (loan)

Senior career*
Years	Team	Apps	(Gls)
2015–2016	→ Michalovce (loan)	0	(0)
2016–2017	Prešov	2	(0)
2017–2018	Lokomotíva Košice	0	(0)
2018	→ Vranov nad Topľou (loan)	0	(0)
2018–2025	Vranov nad Topľou	?	(13)
2025–2026	Tesla Stropkov		
2026–	FK Humenné		
- * Club domestic league appearances and goals as of 17:06, February 24, 2026 (UTC)

Jakub Straka (born 17 June 1997) is a Slovak football defender who currently plays for 3. liga club FK Humenné.

Straka first began playing for Zemplín Michalovce, Tatran Prešov and Lokomotiva Košice. From there, he would go on to play for clubs in the 3. Liga and would feature for the Slovakia national futsal team.

== Club career ==
=== Early career ===
Straka is a native village of Soľ, which is where he started playing football. He then joined MFK Zemplín Michalovce. Despite being a defensive player, he scored 6 goals in the autumn part of this league season.

=== Tatran Prešov ===
Straka transferred to Prešov following a summer trial, signing a one-year contract with the team. He made his professional Fortuna Liga debut for 1. FC Tatran Prešov against MFK Ružomberok on 16 July 2016. He made his final appearance for the club in a 2–0 home loss against FK Železiarne Podbrezová.

=== Later career ===
In 2018, Straka joined MFK Vranov nad Topľou. He scored the goal of the year directly from a corner, in the match of the 2023–24 season of the III. League East against Stará Ľubovňa. His goal received a total of 1,772 votes. In 2025, following good performances with Vranov nad Topľou, Straka would be selected to be a part of the Slovakia national futsal team ahead of the 2025 WMF World Cup held in Baku, Azerbaijan. In his final season with the club, he together with Patrik Košud, would be the team's top scorer with 11 goals. He also contributed 13 assists, making him the only player to break double figures. In 2025, Straka joined MŠK Tesla Stropkov. In winter 2026, he transferred to recently relegated side FK Humenné.
