= František Vancák =

Slovak footballer

Personal information
- Full name: František Vancák
- Date of birth: 19 July 1994 (age 32)
- Place of birth: Slovakia
- Height: 1.75 m (5 ft 9 in)
- Positions: Defensive midfielder; defender

Team information
- Current team: Slávia Košice
- Number: 17

Youth career
- MFK Košice

Senior career*
Years	Team	Apps	(Gls)
2014–2015	VSS Košice B	26	(2)
2014–2017	VSS Košice	36	(2)
2017	Lokomotíva Košice	8	(1)
2018–2022	FC Košice	28	(1)
2022–	Slávia Košice	114	(11)
- * Club domestic league appearances and goals as of 25 May 2026

František Vancák (born 19 July 1994) is a Slovak footballer who plays as a midfielder for Slávia Košice.

== Club career ==
=== MFK Košice ===
He made his debut for MFK Košice on 20 September 2014 against Spartak Myjava, entering in as a substitute in place of Miroslav Viazanko in the 89th minute of the match. Before moving to Lokomotíva Košice he was club captain of VSS Košice.
