= Adrián Slančík =

Slovak footballer

Personal information
- Full name: Adrián Slančík
- Date of birth: 22 July 1999 (age 27)
- Place of birth: Zvolen, Slovakia
- Position: Goalkeeper

Team information
- Current team: Tatran Liptovský Mikuláš
- Number: 30

Youth career
- 2008–2010: TJ Slovan AX Budča
- 2010–2012: Lokomotíva Zvolen
- 2012–2016: Dukla Banská Bystrica
- 2016–2017: Tatran Prešov

Senior career*
Years	Team	Apps	(Gls)
2017–2018	Tatran Prešov	10	(0)
2018–2020	DAC Dunajská Streda	0	(0)
2020	→ Šamorín (loan)	8	(0)
2020–2021	Senica	0	(0)
2021–2023	Pohronie	25	(0)
2023	RSC Hamsik Academy	?	(?)
2024-2025	Stará Ľubovňa	12	(0)
2025-	Tatran Liptovský Mikuláš	30	(0)

International career^{‡}
2018	Slovakia U19	1	(0)
2018	Slovakia U20	1	(0)
- * Club domestic league appearances and goals as of 25 May 2026 ‡ National team caps and goals as of 5 August 2020

Adrián Slančík (born 22 July 1999) is a Slovak professional footballer who currently plays for Tatran Liptovský Mikuláš, competing in the 2. Liga, as a goalkeeper.

== Club career ==
=== 1. FC Tatran Prešov ===
Slančík made his Fortuna Liga debut for Tatran Prešov at Pasienky against Slovan Bratislava on 22 October 2017. Despite being the underdogs in the match, Tatran only lost by a single goal - 2:3. Slančík conceded a goal from Hungarian international Dávid Holman and two more from Czech top scorer of Slovan Jakub Mareš.

=== FK Pohronie ===
After match-less spells in the top division at DAC and Senica, in the summer of 2021, Slančík returned to native central Slovakia to a town of Žiar nad Hronom, where he signed with Pohronie. While he remained benched in the first round fixture of the new season at Štadión Antona Malatinského against Spartak Trnava, due to an illness of the preferred goalkeeper Libor Hrdlička, Slančík had debuted in the second matchday on 31 July 2021. Pohronie won the home fixture against Zemplín Michalovce 2:0, via two first half goals by Ladji Mallé and Miloš Lačný. After the match, he described the match as difficult, applauding the field players for two early strikes and solid defensive work, while highlighting the need to improve the performance.
