= 1940–41 Slovenská liga =

Slovenská liga
- Season: 1940–41
- Champions: ŠK Bratislava
- Relegated: ZTK Zvolen; DSK Bratislava

The 1940–41 Slovenská liga (English:Slovak league) was the third season of the Slovenská liga, the first tier of league football in the Slovak Republic, formerly part of Czechoslovakia until the German occupation of the country in March 1939.

In the Slovak Republic an independent Slovak league had been established in 1939 and played out its own championship which was won by ŠK Bratislava in 1940–41. In the German-annexed Protectorate of Bohemia and Moravia a separate league, the Národní liga (English:National league), was played and won by Slavia Prague in the 1940–41 season. (A national Czechoslovak championship was perforce not played between 1939 and 1945.)

== Table ==
Pos	Team	Pld	W	D	L	GF	GA	GD	Pts	Qualification or relegation
1	ŠK Bratislava	22	14	4	4	90	33	+57	32	League champion
2	FC Vrútky	22	13	5	4	48	36	+12	31	
3	AC Považská Bystrica	22	11	4	7	48	34	+14	26	
4	SK Slávia Prešov	22	10	4	8	50	52	−2	24	
5	MFK Ružomberok	22	10	3	9	46	46	0	23	
6	TSS Trnava	22	7	7	8	49	52	−3	21	
7	TTS Trenčín	22	8	4	10	44	50	−6	20	
8	MŠK Žilina	22	7	5	10	42	49	−7	19	
9	VAS Bratislava	22	8	2	12	36	51	−15	18	
10	AC Spišská Nová Ves	22	6	6	10	36	55	−19	18	
11	ZTK Zvolen	22	7	3	12	51	59	−8	17	Relegated
12	DSK Bratislava	22	6	3	13	35	58	−23	15	Relegated

Source: RSSSF
