= 1939–40 Slovenská liga =

Slovenská liga
- Season: 1939–40
- Champions: ŠK Bratislava
- Relegated: TS Topoľčany; SK Banská Bystrica

The 1939–40 Slovenská liga (English:Slovak league) was the second season of the Slovenská liga, the first tier of league football in the Slovak Republic, formerly part of Czechoslovakia until the German occupation of the country in March 1939.

In the Slovak Republic an independent Slovak league had been established in 1939 and played out its own championship which was won by ŠK Bratislava in 1939–40. In the German-annexed Protectorate of Bohemia and Moravia a separate league, the Národní liga (English:National league), was played and won by Slavia Prague in the 1939–40 season. A national Czechoslovak championship was not played between 1939 and 1945.

== Table ==
For the 1939–40 season FC Vrútky, VAS Bratislava and SK Banská Bystrica had been newly promoted to the league.

Pos	Team	Pld	W	D	L	GF	GA	GR	Pts
1	ŠK Bratislava (C)	22	18	1	3	100	22	4.545	37
2	Sparta Považská Bystrica	22	15	3	4	76	29	2.621	33
3	MŠK Žilina	22	13	2	7	50	36	1.389	28
4	TSS Trnava	22	9	5	8	41	47	0.872	23
5	FC Vrútky	22	10	1	11	47	44	1.068	21
6	Slávia Prešov	22	9	3	10	59	68	0.868	21
7	ZTK Zvolen	22	7	7	8	46	58	0.793	21
8	TTS Trenčín	22	7	4	11	43	42	1.024	18
9	VAS Bratislava	22	8	2	12	39	74	0.527	18
10	Spišská Nová Ves	22	6	4	12	41	69	0.594	16
11	TS Topoľčany (R)	22	7	2	13	32	54	0.593	16
12	SK Banská Bystrica (R)	22	5	2	15	30	61	0.492	12

Source: rsssf.com
(C) Champions; (R) Relegated
