= Slovak Extraliga =

Ice hockey league in Slovakia

Tipsport Liga
- Formerly: Czechoslovak First Ice Hockey League
- Sport: Ice hockey
- Founded: 1993
- No. of teams: 12
- Country: Slovakia
- Most recent champions: HK Nitra (3rd title)
- Most titles: HC Košice (10 titles)
- Broadcasters: TV JOJ (Slovakia); Sport1 (Czechia, Hungary, Slovakia)
- Relegation to: Slovak 1. Liga
- Related competitions: Slovak 1. Liga; Slovak 2. Liga
- Website: hockeyslovakia.sk

The Slovak Extraliga, known as the Tipsport liga since the 2025–26 season for sponsorship reasons, is the highest-level ice hockey league in Slovakia. From 2018–19 to 2020–21, the league included two and later one team from Hungary.

Teams from the Extraliga can participate in the IIHF's annual Champions Hockey League (CHL). Participation is based on the strength of the various leagues in Europe (excluding the KHL). In the 2022–23 CHL season, the Extraliga was ranked the No. 10 league in Europe, so the champion of the previous season competed in the CHL.

The 1993–94 season was the first of the Slovak Extraliga following the peaceful dissolution of Czechoslovakia midway through the 1992–93 Czechoslovak Extraliga season – which all Slovak and Czech teams played to completion.

== Game ==
Every regular season game is composed of three 20-minute periods, with an intermission of a maximum of 18 minutes between periods. If the game is tied following the 60-minute regulation time, a five-minute three-on-three sudden death overtime period is played. If a game is still tied after the overtime, a shootout decides the winner of the game. In a shootout, the team that scores the most penalty shots out of five attempts wins the game. If a game is still tied after five penalty-shot rounds, the shootout continues round by round, until one team scores while the other team fails to score.

== Teams ==
Teams competing in Tipos Extraliga in the 2026–27 season.

=== 2026–27 season ===
Team name	City	Venue	Capacity
HC Košice	Košice	Steel Arena	8,378
HC Prešov	Prešov	Zimný štadión Prešov	3,600
HC Slovan Bratislava	Bratislava	Tipos Arena	10,055
HC Banská Bystrica	Banská Bystrica	Tipsport Arena Banská Bystrica	3,016
Vlci Žilina	Žilina	Niké Arena	6,200
HK Dukla Trenčín	Trenčín	Zimný štadión Pavla Demitru	6,300
HK Nitra	Nitra	Tipsport Arena Nitra	3,600
HK Poprad	Poprad	Zimný štadión Poprad	4,233
HKM Zvolen	Zvolen	TiposBet Arena Zvolen	5,675
MHK 32 Liptovský Mikuláš	Liptovský Mikuláš	JL Aréna	3,680
HK Dukla Michalovce	Michalovce	TiposBet Arena Michalovce	4,000
HK Spišská Nová Ves	Spišská Nová Ves	TiposBet Arena Spišská Nová Ves	5,503

== Season structure ==
The Tipsport Liga season is divided into a regular season from late September through the beginning of March, when teams play against each other in a pre-defined schedule, and playoffs from March to April, which is an elimination tournament at which two teams play against each other to win the best-of-seven series in order to advance to the next round. The winner of playoffs is crowned the Slovak champion, (Majster Slovenska in Slovak) and receives the Vladimír Dzurilla Trophy.

=== Regular season ===
The regular season is a round-robin and each team plays 54 games. Three points are awarded for winning in regulation time, two points for winning in overtime or a shootout, one point for losing in overtime or a shootout, and zero points for losing in regulation time. At the end of the regular season, the team that finishes with the most points is crowned the league champion. The six highest-ranked teams by points qualify directly for the playoffs. The four teams ranked 7–10 play a best-of-five series and battle for the two remaining playoffs spots. The lowest ranked team after the regular season is a relegated to the second-tier league Slovenská hokejová liga.

If two or more teams end up tied in points, the seeds are determined by the following tiebreaker format:

1. Head-to-head points

=== Play-in ===
Starting in the 2018–19 season, the four teams ranked 7–10 in the regular season play a best-of-five series, known as play-in, and battle for the two remaining playoff spots. The seventh-ranked team faces the tenth-ranked team, and the eighth-ranked team faces the ninth-ranked team. The seventh-ranked team and the eighth-ranked team receive home-ice advantage and play three of the five games at their home venue if it is necessary to determine a winner of the series. The winners of the two best-of-five series take the two remaining playoffs spots.

=== Playoffs ===
The Tipsport Liga playoffs is an elimination tournament, at which two teams battle to win a best-of-seven series in order to advance to the next round. In the first round of the playoffs (quarterfinals), the top seed faces the lowest-ranked winner of the two best-of-three series (eighth seed, ninth seed or tenth seed); the second-ranked seed faces the other winner of the two best-of-five series; the third-ranked seed faces the sixth-ranked seed; and the fourth-ranked seed faces the fifth-ranked team. In the second round (semifinals), the teams are re-seeded, with the top remaining seed playing against the lowest remaining seed, and the other two remaining teams pairing up. In the third round (finals), the two remaining teams face each other.

In each series, the higher-ranked team of the two has home-ice advantage. Four of the seven games are played at this team's home venue – the first and second, and, when necessary, the fifth and seventh games and all the other games are played at the lower-ranked team's home venue.

== Names and sponsorship ==
The name of the league is leased to sponsors and changes frequently. From 1993–94 to 1997–98, it was called Extraliga, then the name changed to West Extraliga until the end of the 2000–01 season. In 2001–02, its name was Boss Extraliga. From 2002–03 to 2004–05, the name was ST Extraliga and in 2005–06 the name was T-Com Extraliga (same corporate sponsor, rebranded themselves). After starting the 2006–07 season without a sponsorship, reverting to straightforward Extraliga, the name changed midway through the season to Slovnaft Extraliga, when a general sponsorship agreement with Slovnaft was signed on 16 January 2007; this name continued through the end of the 2010–11 season. From 2011–12 to 2014–15, it carried the two part name Tipsport Extraliga and Slovnaft Play-off, reflecting a specific sponsorship arrangement for the playoffs; this name was slightly adjusted, starting with the 2015–16 season, to Tipsport Liga and Slovnaft Play-off. Starting 2020-21, it was renamed to Tipos Extraliga. The current name, starting 2025, is Tipsport Liga.

Period	Name	Sponsor
1993–1997	Extraliga	none
1997–2001	West extraliga	West
2001–2002	Boss extraliga	Boss
2002–2005	ST extraliga	Slovak Telekom
2005–2006	T-Com extraliga	T-Com
2006–2007 (half-season)	Extraliga	none
2007–2011	Slovnaft extraliga	Slovnaft
2011–2015	Tipsport extraliga	Tipsport
2015–2020	Tipsport liga	Tipsport
2020–2025	Tipos extraliga	Tipos
2025–2030	Tipsport liga	Tipsport

== Previous winners ==
=== Previous Slovak Extraliga playoffs winners (Slovak Champions) ===
- 1994 – Dukla Trenčín
- 1995 – HC Košice
- 1996 – HC Košice
- 1997 – Dukla Trenčín
- 1998 – Slovan Bratislava
- 1999 – HC Košice
- 2000 – Slovan Bratislava
- 2001 – HKm Zvolen
- 2002 – Slovan Bratislava
- 2003 – Slovan Bratislava
- 2004 – Dukla Trenčín
- 2005 – Slovan Bratislava
- 2006 – MsHK Žilina
- 2007 – Slovan Bratislava
- 2008 – Slovan Bratislava
- 2009 – HC Košice
- 2010 – HC Košice
- 2011 – HC Košice
- 2012 – Slovan Bratislava
- 2013 – HKM Zvolen
- 2014 – HC Košice
- 2015 – HC Košice
- 2016 – HK Nitra
- 2017 – HC '05 Banská Bystrica
- 2018 – HC '05 Banská Bystrica
- 2019 – HC '05 Banská Bystrica
- 2020 – Not held due to COVID-19 pandemic
- 2021 – HKM Zvolen
- 2022 – Slovan Bratislava
- 2023 – HC Košice
- 2024 – HK Nitra
- 2025 – HC Košice
- 2026 – HK Nitra

=== Previous Slovak Extraliga regular season winners ===
- 1994 – Dukla Trenčín
- 1995 – Dukla Trenčín
- 1996 – HC Košice
- 1997 – Dukla Trenčín
- 1998 – Slovan Bratislava
- 1999 – Slovan Bratislava
- 2000 – Slovan Bratislava
- 2001 – HKm Zvolen
- 2002 – HKm Zvolen
- 2003 – Slovan Bratislava
- 2004 – Dukla Trenčín
- 2005 – HKm Zvolen
- 2006 – HK Nitra
- 2007 – HC Košice
- 2008 – Slovan Bratislava
- 2009 – HC Košice
- 2010 – Slovan Bratislava
- 2011 – HC Košice
- 2012 – HC Košice
- 2013 – HKM Zvolen
- 2014 – HC Košice
- 2015 – HC Košice
- 2016 – HC Košice
- 2017 – HC '05 Banská Bystrica
- 2018 – HK Nitra
- 2019 – HC '05 Banská Bystrica
- 2020 – HC '05 Banská Bystrica
- 2021 – HKM Zvolen
- 2022 – Slovan Bratislava
- 2023 – HC Košice
- 2024 – HK Poprad
- 2025 – HK Spišská Nová Ves
- 2026 – HK Nitra

== Video games ==
Teams from the league are playable in the video games EA Sports' NHL series only in NHL 09.

== See also ==
- Czech Extraliga
- Czechoslovak Extraliga
- List of Slovak ice hockey champions
