= Jakob Jakobeus =

Jakob Jakobeus (also spelled Jakub Jakobeus) (1591–1645) was a Slovak writer, historian, and poet. He was the author of Tears, Sighs and Pleas of the Slovak Nation (called in the day's Latin Gentis Slavonicae lacrimae, suspiria et vota). This is said to be the first known defense of the Slovak nation.

== Biography ==
Jakobeus was born to a bourgeois family in Kutná Hora, Bohemia, modern day Czech Republic. He completed his education at Charles University in Prague. In 1618 he was ordained a Protestant priest. Due to him being Protestant, he was forced to leave Bohemia when Holy Roman Emperor Ferdinand II, a devout Catholic, expelled all Protestants from Bohemia following his victory at the Battle of White Mountain in 1620. He chose to flee to Saxony, which was a mainly Protestant area. In 1624, he left Saxony and moved to his ancestral land, Slovakia, former Upper Hungary, where he spent the remainder of his life. While in Upper Hungary, now Slovakia he worked as a teacher and spiritual guide. He died in 1645 in Prešov, Slovakia, former Upper Hungary

== Writings ==
Jakobeus, being a prolific writer, wrote many books. Like most other learned men of his day, he was fluent in Latin, and he wrote many works in Latin. Whilst in Soľ, Slovakia, he wrote a collection of poetry in Latin.

Among his most widely held works are:

- Dissertatio philologica, De materia et forma librorum apud veteres ante inventam artem typographicam ...
- Scythæ præ Barbaro prærogativa deducta ex Col. III. ii, quam brevi hoc schediasmate publicè exponet Jacobus Jacobæus, etc. Resp. Janus Bruun
- Idea mutationum Bohemo-evangelicarum ecclesiarum, in florentissimo regno Bohemiae à traditionibus humanis Pragae reformatarum ... simpliciter decerpta
- Cesty k Tobě
- Výber z diela. Štúdiu napísal Jozef Minárik. Texty preložili a poznámky napísali Josef Minárik, Mária Vyvijalová. With facsimiles and translations in Slovak.
- De arte Christi mechanica, privatos intra parietes exculta
- Výber z diela : Okolo r. 1591-1645. Texty preložili a poznámky napísali Jozef Minárik, Mária Vyvíjalová
- Teils., slowak. Jakub Jakobeus <okolo r.1591-1645>
- Poem admirandae et adorandae Jesu Christi theanthropiae
- Curiosus et simul incautus Aristarchus, sive dissertatio philologico- critica de veterum grammaticorum censura circa libros eorumq[ue] inscriptiones, qvam ... publico examini submittit Jacobus Jacobaeus, Olig. fil. respondente ... Petro Muller in auditorio die 3 April anno 1705
