= List of Slovak ice hockey champions =

The Slovak ice hockey champions is a title awarded annually to the winning playoff team of the top-tier ice hockey league in Slovakia, which currently is Tipos Extraliga. It was first awarded to Dukla Trenčín in 1994, the championship's inaugural year. HC Košice hold the most titles in history with 10 titles. The most recent Slovak Champions are HC Košice, who won their tenth title in club history in 2025.

== Previous winners ==
Season	Winners	Runners-up
1994	HK Dukla Trenčín (1)	HC Košice
1995	HC Košice (1)	HK Dukla Trenčín
1996	HC Košice (2)	HK Dukla Trenčín
1997	HK Dukla Trenčín (2)	HC Košice
1998	HC Slovan Bratislava (1)	HC Košice
1999	HC Košice (3)	HC Slovan Bratislava
2000	HC Slovan Bratislava (2)	HKM Zvolen
2001	HKM Zvolen (1)	HK Dukla Trenčín
2002	HC Slovan Bratislava (3)	HKM Zvolen
2003	HC Slovan Bratislava (4)	HC Košice
2004	HK Dukla Trenčín (3)	HKM Zvolen
2005	HC Slovan Bratislava (5)	HKM Zvolen
2006	MsHK Žilina (1)	HK Poprad
2007	HC Slovan Bratislava (6)	HK Dukla Trenčín
2008	HC Slovan Bratislava (7)	HC Košice
2009	HC Košice (4)	HK 36 Skalica
2010	HC Košice (5)	HC Slovan Bratislava
2011	HC Košice (6)	HK Poprad
2012	HC Slovan Bratislava (8)	HC Košice
2013	HKM Zvolen (2)	HC Košice
2014	HC Košice (7)	HK Nitra
2015	HC Košice (8)	HC '05 Banská Bystrica
2016	HK Nitra (1)	HC '05 Banská Bystrica
2017	HC '05 Banská Bystrica (1)	HK Nitra
2018	HC '05 Banská Bystrica (2)	HK Dukla Trenčín
2019	HC '05 Banská Bystrica (3)	HK Nitra
2020	No competition (Note: No playoffs due to the COVID-19 pandemic in Slovakia. HC '05 Banská Bystrica won the regular season.)	
2021	HKM Zvolen (3)	HK Poprad
2022	HC Slovan Bratislava (9)	HK Nitra
2023	HC Košice (9)	HKM Zvolen
2024	HK Nitra (2)	HK Spišská Nová Ves
2025	HC Košice (10)	HK Nitra
2026	HK Nitra (3)	HC Slovan Bratislava

== Title champions ==
Titles	Club
10	HC Košice
9	HC Slovan Bratislava
3	HK Nitra
3	HK Dukla Trenčín
3	HC '05 Banská Bystrica
3	HKM Zvolen
1	MsHK Žilina

== See also ==
- Tipsport liga
- Ice hockey in Slovakia
