= Jozef Škrlík =

Slovak football manager (born 1962)

Personal information
- Date of birth: 2 October 1962 (age 64)
- Place of birth: Humenné, Czechoslovakia
- Height: 1.73 m (5 ft 8 in)

Team information
- Current team: FK Humenné (manager)

Senior career*
Years	Team	Apps	(Gls)
- 1. HFC Humenné
- Hradec Králové
- Chemko Strážske
- Spartak Medzilaborce

Managerial career
- Trebišov
- 2004: Zemplín Michalovce
- 2008–2009: 1. HFC Humenné
- 2009: Vranov nad Topľou
- 2010–2011: Lučenec
- 2011: Prešov (assistant)
- 2012: FC Akzhayik
- 2013: Liptovský Mikuláš
- 2014: FC Ordabasy (assistant)
- 2014–2015: Kazakhstan U21 (assistant)
- 2016: FK Jelgava (assistant)
- 2017–2018: Shakhter Karagandy (assistant)
- 2019: FK Humenné
- 2020–: FK Humenné
- * Club domestic league appearances and goals

Jozef Škrlík (born 2 October 1962) is a Slovak football manager and former player who manages FK Humenné. He managed also Kazakhstan U21 and Kazakh team FC Akzhayik.
