= Mathew Yakubu =

Nigerian footballer

Personal information
- Full name: Mathew Yakubu
- Date of birth: 9 March 1999 (age 27)
- Place of birth: Zaria, Nigeria
- Height: 1.85 m (6 ft 1 in)
- Position: Goalkeeper

Team information
- Current team: MFK Dukla Banská Bystrica
- Number: 28

Youth career
- –2019: Clique Sports Academy

Senior career*
Years	Team	Apps	(Gls)
2019–2022	ŠKF Sereď	34	(0)
2023–2024	Stará Ľubovňa	14	(0)
2024–2025	OFK Baník Lehota pod Vtáčnikom	0	(0)
2025–2026	MFK Dukla Banská Bystrica	21	(0)
- * Club domestic league appearances and goals as of 25 May 2026

Mathew Yakubu (born 9 March 1999) is a Nigerian professional association football player who plays as a goalkeeper for Slovak club MFK Dukla Banská Bystrica.

== Club career ==
=== Early career ===
Yakubu started his youth career at the Clique Sports Academy in Nigeria before moving to Slovakia to pursue professional football.

=== ŠKF Sereď ===
Yakubu signed with Slovak Fortuna Liga club ŠKF Sereď in 2019 and made his league debut on 11 July 2020 against ViOn Zlaté Moravce. During his tenure, he played 34 league matches and kept 10 clean sheets—an impressive near 30% clean sheet rate for his club's goalkeeping position. His performances earned him national recognition with a nomination for the 2020 Nigerian Goalkeeper of the Year award, as acknowledged by his former club.

=== Redfox FC Stará Ľubovňa ===
In 2024, Yakubu joined Redfox FC Stará Ľubovňa, competing in the Slovak 2. liga. Over 14 matches, he recorded four clean sheets. The club publicly praised his consistent performances and leadership from goal during his spell there. His reliability was a key factor in the team's defensive stability throughout the season.

=== OFK Baník Lehota pod Vtáčnikom ===
Yakubu started with OFK Baník Lehota pod Vtáčnikom in early 2024 and quickly became a pivotal player. His vital saves helped the club survive a tense playoff, securing historic promotion to the 2. liga (second tier) of Slovak football. He was hailed as the "hero" of the promotion playoff and received widespread praise for his performance under pressure. Despite his success, Yakubu left the club after securing promotion to pursue new challenges.

== Playing style ==
Yakubu is known for his athletic ability, shot-stopping skills, and vocal presence in organizing his defense.

== Personal life ==
Yakubu is married to a Slovak woman, and the couple has two children. Their wedding was also covered by local media.
