= Mojmír Trebuňák =

Slovak footballer

Personal information
- Full name: Mojmír Trebuňák
- Date of birth: 30 January 1993 (age 33)
- Place of birth: Košice, Slovakia
- Height: 1.83 m (6 ft 0 in)
- Position: Winger

Team information
- Current team: Slávia TU Košice
- Number: 73

Youth career
- MFK Košice

Senior career*
Years	Team	Apps	(Gls)
2013–2016	VSS Košice	22	(4)
2014–2015	→ VSS Košice II (loan)	25	(3)
2017	Prešov	15	(1)
2018–2019	FC Košice	25	(6)
2019–	Slávia TU Košice	145	(60)
- * Club domestic league appearances and goals as of 25 May 2026

Mojmír Trebuňák (born 30 January 1993) is a Slovak football winger who plays for Slávia TU Košice.

== Career ==
=== MFK Košice ===
He made his debut for the club in a 4–2 home Corgoň Liga win against FC Nitra, coming on as a 70'th minute substitution.

=== Slávia TU Košice ===
On 10 September 2019, Trebuňák joined Slávia TU Košice.
