= Slávia TU Košice =

Slovak football club

- Full name: Slávia Technická univerzita Košice
- Founded: 2014; 12 years ago
- Ground: Štadión TU Watsonova, Košice
- Capacity: 1,000 (350 seated)
- Head coach: Matej Timkovič
- League: 3. Liga
- 2025–26: 14 th, 2. liga (relegated)
- Website: https://www.fkslaviatuke.sk

Slávia TU Košice is a Slovak football team, based in the city of Košice, that competes for the first time in its history in the 2. Liga, the 2nd tier of Slovak football.

== History ==
By winning the 2024–25 season in the Východ (East) group, the club secured promotion to the 2nd tier of Slovak football for the first time in its history.

== Current squad ==
Updated 18 January 2026 Note: Flags indicate national team as defined under FIFA eligibility rules; some limited exceptions apply. Players may hold more than one non-FIFA nationality.

No.	Pos.	Nation	Player
1	GK	SVK	Oliver Poľa
4	DF	SVK	Nikolas Bajus
5	DF	SVK	Richard Župa
8	MF	SVK	Štefan Harvila
9	MF	SVK	Boris Gall
10	FW	NGR	Elvis Isaac
11	MF	SVK	Šimon Sabolčík
12	MF	SVK	David Petrik
13	MF	SVK	Samuel Hasaj
15	MF	SVK	Norbert Matta
16	MF	SVK	Damián Urban

No.	Pos.	Nation	Player
17	MF	SVK	František Vancák (captain)
18	MF	SVK	Rastislav Korba
19	DF	UKR	Denys Zolotovetskyi
21	DF	SVK	Ľubomír Korijkov
22	DF	SVK	Matej Podstavek
23	DF	SVK	Michal Jonec
24	MF	SVK	Michal Domik
25	MF	UKR	Taras Zaviyskyi
30	GK	SVK	Martin Leško
73	MF	SVK	Mojmír Trebuňák
90	GK	SVK	Ľubomír Pangrác
TBA	FW	COD	Herve Hiba

For recent transfers, see List of Slovak football transfers summer 2025.

== Colours ==
Club colours are grey and white.
