= Soľ =

- Municipality
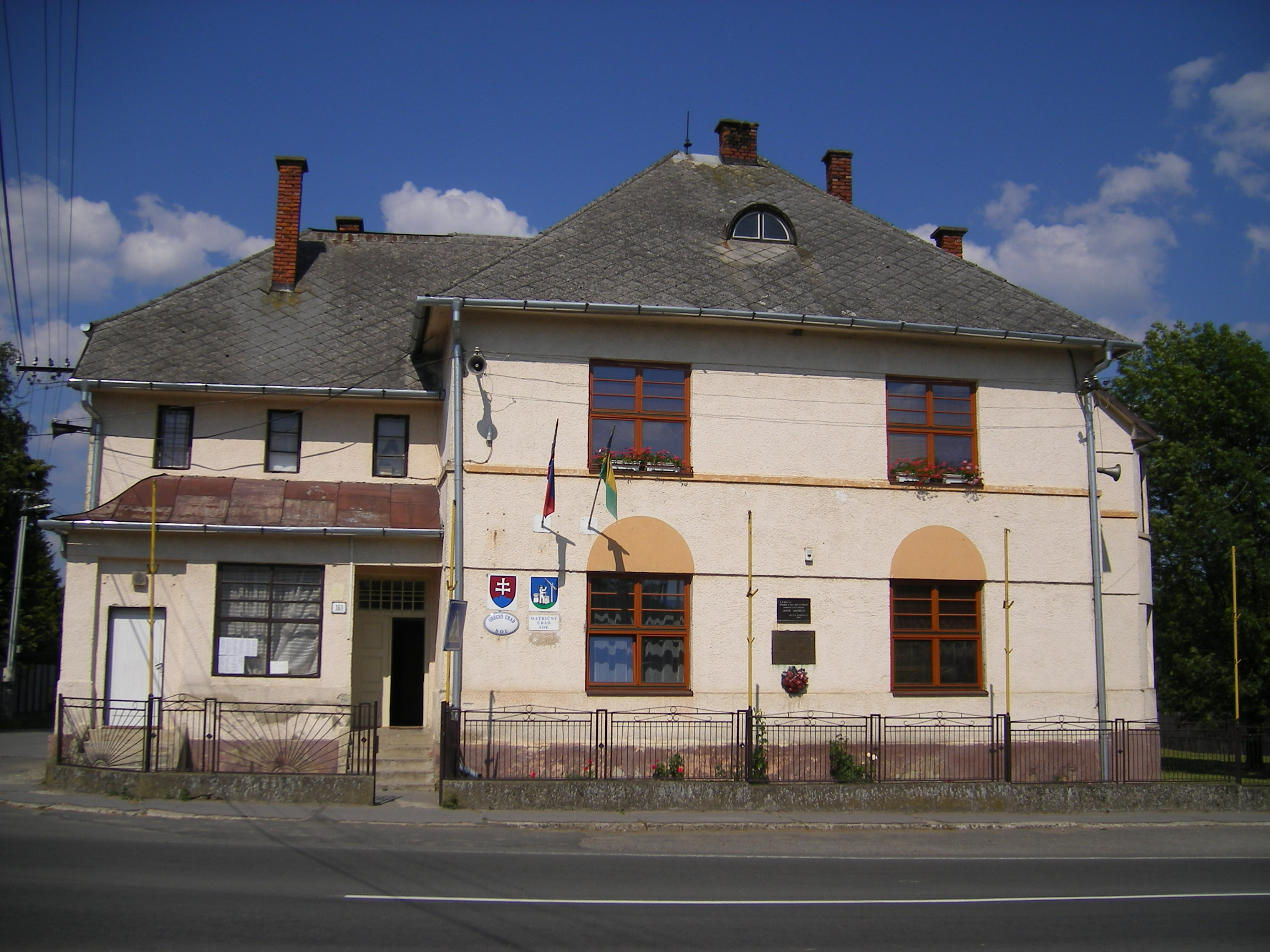
- Town hall in Soľ

- Flag

- Location of Soľ in the Prešov Region Location of Soľ in Slovakia
- Coordinates: 48.93°N 21.60°E
- Country: Slovakia
- Region: Prešov Region
- District: Vranov nad Topľou District
- First mentioned: 1402

Area
  - Total: 10.28 km^{2} (3.97 sq mi)
- Elevation: 143 m (469 ft)

Population (2025)
  - Total: 2,698
- Time zone: UTC+1 (CET)
  - Summer (DST): UTC+2 (CEST)
- Postal code: 943 5
- Area code: +421 57
- Vehicle registration plate (until 2022): VT
- Website: www.obecsol.sk

Soľ (Hungarian: Sókút) is a village and municipality in Vranov nad Topľou District in the Prešov Region of eastern Slovakia. It is one of the oldest villages in eastern Slovakia.

== History ==
The land that is now Sol' was the location of intermittent human settlements ranging from the Stone Age to the foundation of Sol' itself. It was likely settled because of its advantageous position.

The village was first mentioned in 1252. Its name, Sol', which is Slovak for salt, comes from the three salt water springs which are in the vicinity of the village. The salt from the springs was used to salt foods until the beginning of World War I.

In the summer of 1831, the village suffered a cholera outbreak which was followed by a large peasant uprising.

The village had a sizable Jewish community in the 1800s, which had its own synagogue and may have had a religious school.

== Geography ==
The municipality lies at an altitude of 143 metres (469 ft) and covers an area of 10.28 km^{2} (3.97 sq mi) (2025).

== Population ==
Population statistic (10 years)
Year	1995	2005	2015	2025
Count	2029	2318	2516	2698
Difference		+14.24%	+8.54%	+7.23%

Population statistic
Year	2024	2025
Count	2664	2698
Difference		+1.27%

It has a population of 2698 people (31 December 2025).

=== Ethnicity ===
Census 2021 (1+ %)
Ethnicity	Number	Fraction
Slovak	2260	85.96%
Romani	534	20.31%
Not found out	114	4.33%
Total	2629	

In year 2021 was 2629 people by ethnicity 2260 as Slovak, 534 as Romani, 114 as Not found out, 17 as Czech, 12 as Other, 4 as Ukrainian, 4 as German, 3 as Rusyn, 2 as Hungarian and 2 as English.

Note on population: The difference values of population numbers in the table "Population statistic" and in the sections "Ethnicity" & "Religion" is caused by the use of various statistical methods.

=== Religion ===
Census 2021 (1+ %)
Religion	Number	Fraction
Roman Catholic Church	1322	50.29%
Evangelical Church	395	15.02%
Greek Catholic Church	391	14.87%
None	195	7.42%
Apostolic Church	189	7.19%
Not found out	77	2.93%
Total	2629	

In year 2021 was 2629 people by religion 1322 from Roman Catholic Church, 395 from Evangelical Church, 391 from Greek Catholic Church, 195 from None, 189 from Apostolic Church, 77 from Not found out, 15 from Jehovah's Witnesses, 13 from Other and not ascertained christian church, 8 from Eastern Orthodox Church, 8 from Christian Congregations in Slovakia, 6 from Church of the Brethren, 5 from Ad hoc movements, 2 from Calvinist Church, 1 from Paganism and natural spirituality, 1 from United Methodist Church and 1 from Buddhism.

== Economy and infrastructure ==
=== Transportation ===
The village has a railroad station in the outskirts, and a bus stop in the center of the village.

=== Education ===
There is a school in the village which serves Soľ and some surrounding villages. The school had an enrollment of 521 5-9 graders in the 2005/2006 school year. The school itself contains two buildings; an older building built in 1957, and a newer addition built in 1975.

There is also a kindergarten with 65 students (as of the 2005/2006 school year).

== Politics ==
Joseph Berta has served as mayor of Sol' since 1994.

== Notable residents ==
- Jakob Jakobeus, a famous Slovak poet, historian, writer, and Protestant priest, lived in Sol' from 1626 to 1629. He served as pastor of the village during his stay and he wrote a collection of Latin poetry.
