= Martin Kuciak =

Slovak footballer

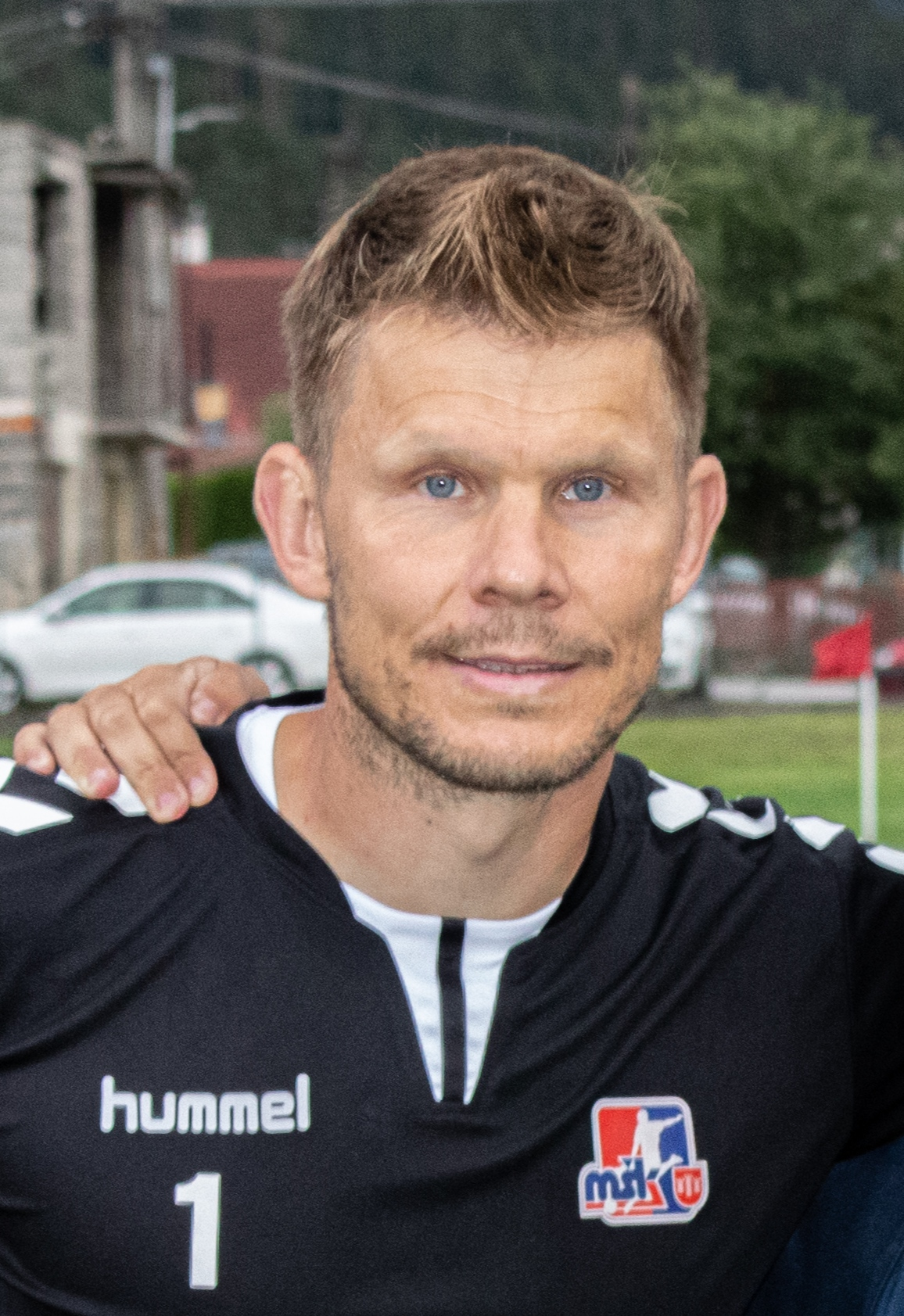
- Kuciak with Považská Bystrica in 2020

Personal information
- Full name: Martin Kuciak
- Date of birth: 15 March 1982 (age 44)
- Place of birth: Žilina, Czechoslovakia
- Height: 1.84 m (6 ft 0 in)
- Position: Goalkeeper

Team information
- Current team: Považská Bystrica (manager)

Youth career
- Žilina

Senior career*
Years	Team	Apps	(Gls)
2004–2005	Kysucké Nové Mesto		
2005–2009	Rimavská Sobota		
2010–2014	ViOn Zlaté Moravce	132	(0)
2014–2015	Hradec Králové	5	(0)
2015–2019	ŽP Šport Podbrezová	111	(0)
2019	Slavia Prague	0	(0)
2019–2020	Nitra	1	(0)
2020–2022	Považská Bystrica		

Managerial career
- 2026–: Považská Bystrica
- * Club domestic league appearances and goals

Martin Kuciak (born 15 March 1982) is a Slovak professional football manager and former player who played as a goalkeeper. He is currently in charge of 2. Liga club MŠK Považská Bystrica.

He is the elder brother of fellow goalkeeper Dušan Kuciak.

== Club career ==
Martin Kuciak is a product of Žilina youth academy.

=== Rimavská Sobota ===
After a spell at Kysucké Nové Mesto, Kuciak joined Rimavská Sobota in summer 2005, who had been relegated from the Slovak top flight the previous season. He became the number one goalkeeper at the club in the spring part of the 2007–08 season.

=== ViOn Zlaté Moravce ===
Kuciak transferred to the Corgoň liga club ViOn Zlaté Moravce in the winter break of the 2009–10 season. In the following four and a half years at Zlaté Moravce, he played in every single competitive game. Despite his success at the club, Kuciak decided not to renew his contract and left Zlaté Moravce after it expired in summer 2014.

=== Hradec Králové ===
Shortly afterwards, Kuciak signed for the Czech First League club Hradec Králové. He made his debut for Hradec Králové in a 1–0 league loss to Příbram on 4 October 2014. He was mostly used as a back-up goalkeeper behind Tomáš Koubek. Kuciak was relegated with the club at the end of the season.

=== ŽP Šport Podbrezová ===
Kuciak came to ŽP Šport Podbrezová in the summer of 2015. He made his competitive debut for the club in a 2–0 league loss to AS Trenčín on 25 July 2015. In January 2019, he joined Slavia Prague.
