= Gabriel Snitka =

Slovak footballer

Personal information
- Full name: Gabriel Snitka
- Date of birth: 14 August 1985 (age 41)
- Place of birth: Banská Bystrica, Czechoslovakia
- Height: 1.81 m (5 ft 11 1/2 in)
- Positions: Midfielder; defender

Youth career
- Dukla Banská Bystrica

Senior career*
Years	Team	Apps	(Gls)
2005–2007	Kremnička		
2007–2015	ŽP Šport Podbrezová	117	(5)
2015–2017	Dukla Banská Bystrica	63	(6)
2018–2021	MFK Dukla Banská Bystrica	69	(10)
2021–2025	MFK Zvolen	24	(2)
- * Club domestic league appearances and goals as of 7 January 2026

Gabriel Snitka (born 14 August 1985) is a Slovak football defender.
