= Štadión Humenné =

Multi-use stadium in Humenné, Slovakia

Coordinates: 48.92947°N 21.90511°E

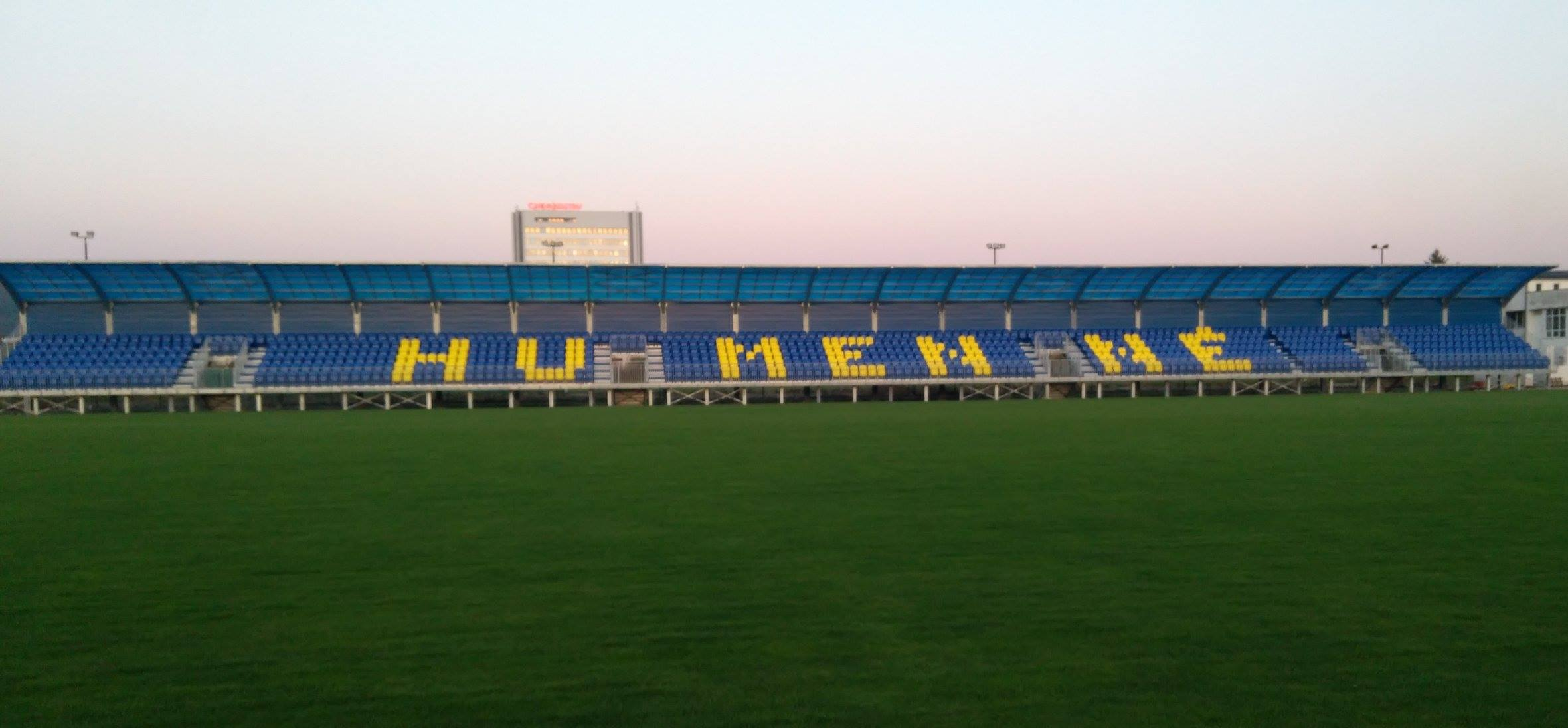
- Interactive map of Štadión Humenné
- Former names: Chemlon Stadium
- Location: Chemlonská, Humenné, Slovakia
- Operator: FK Humenné
- Capacity: 1,806
- Surface: Grass

Construction
- Opened: 1974
- Renovated: 2016–18
- Cost: Renovation 2015–18 €2.1 million

Tenants
- Chemlon Humenné (1974–2015); FK Humenné (2018–present)

Website
- Website

Štadión Humenné is a multi-use stadium in Humenné, Slovakia. It is currently used mostly for football matches and is the home ground of FK Humenné. Until 2015, it was also the stadium of ŠK Futura Humenné. The stadium was built in 1974 and its capacity was 10,000 people.

== History ==
The Štadión Humenné was originally built in 1974. The stadium was home to the Chemlon Hummené football club (later known as HFC Hummené and ŠK Futura Hummené). In 1994, the stadium hosted the Slovak Cup match between Slovan Bratislava and Tatran Prešov. In 2015, ŠK Futura Humenné merged with FK Svidník, and the team moved to Svidník. A new club, FK Humenné, was formed in Humenné to replace the previous team.

=== 2016 reconstruction ===
The reconstruction of the stadium began in 2016. The original capacity of 10,000 was decreased to 1,806 spectators. The estimated cost was €2.1 million. Slovak government provided €750,000 of the cost.
