= Anton Sloboda =

Slovak footballer

Personal information
- Full name: Anton Sloboda
- Date of birth: 10 July 1987 (age 39)
- Place of birth: Považská Bystrica, Czechoslovakia
- Height: 1.79 m (5 ft 10 in)
- Position: Midfielder

Team information
- Current team: Považská Bystrica
- Number: 11

Youth career
- –2002: Raven Považská Bystrica
- 2002–2008: Ružomberok

Senior career*
Years	Team	Apps	(Gls)
2008–2011	Ružomberok	49	(4)
2012	Viktoria Žižkov	28	(2)
2013–2016	Podbeskidzie Bielsko-Biała	70	(4)
2016–2019	Spartak Trnava	60	(7)
2019–2023	ViOn Zlaté Moravce	66	(4)
2023–	Považská Bystrica	67	(5)
- * Club domestic league appearances and goals as of 25 May 2026

Anton Sloboda (born 10 July 1987) is a Slovak footballer who plays as a midfielder for Považská Bystrica.

== Club career ==
He was signed by Spartak Trnava in July 2016.

== Honours ==
Spartak Trnava

- Fortuna Liga: 2017–18
- Slovnaft Cup: 2018–19
