= Lukáš Gašparovič =

Slovak footballer (born 1993)

Personal information
- Full name: Lukáš Gašparovič
- Date of birth: 17 February 1993 (age 33)
- Place of birth: Bratislava, Slovakia
- Height: 1.75 m (5 ft 9 in)
- Position: Attacking midfielder

Team information
- Current team: Petržalka
- Number: 93

Youth career
- TJ Slovan Viničné
- Inter Bratislava
- 2009–2012: Slovan Bratislava

Senior career*
Years	Team	Apps	(Gls)
2012–2016	Slovan Bratislava	8	(2)
2012	→ Slovenský Grob (loan)		
2016	→ Iskra Borčice (loan)	7	(0)
2016–2017	Svätý Jur	32	(2)
2017	SV Stripfing		
2018–	Petržalka	189	(44)
2022	→ Dukla Banská Bystrica (loan)	12	(0)

International career^{‡}
- Slovakia U18
- * Club domestic league appearances and goals as of 25 May 2026 ‡ National team caps and goals as of 2 November 2013

Lukáš Gašparovič (born 17 February 1993) is a Slovak professional footballer who plays as a midfielder for Petržalka.

== Club career ==
=== Early career ===
Gašparovič made his professional debut for Slovan Bratislava against Spartak Myjava on 26 October 2013, entering in as a substitute in place of Erik Grendel.

==== Banská Bystrica (loan) ====
In 2022, Gašparovič joined first league side FK Dukla Banská Bystrica on a loan. He debuted for the side in a 2–0 loss against MFK Zemplín Michalovce, starting the match. His first contribution came in a 2–1 win against MFK Tatran Liptovský Mikuláš assisting a goal for Róbert Polievka after being on the pitch for less the 7 minutes.

== Media ==
Gašparovič had been made popular in 2019, when his likeness to Luka Modrić had been discovered and publicised. In a friendly match against Beşiktaş, the fans chanted his name as Modrić. In the media, Gašparovič is widely referred to as the “Slovak Modrić”.
