= MŠK Považská Bystrica (football) =

Slovak football club

- Full name: MŠK Považská Bystrica
- Founded: 1920; 106 years ago as ŠK
- Ground: Štadión MŠK Považská Bystrica, Považská Bystrica
- Capacity: 1,400 (1,200 seats)
- Head coach: Martin Kuciak
- League: 2. liga
- 2025–26: 2. liga, 12th of 14
- Website: https://mskpb.eu/
Home colours	Away colours

MŠK Považská Bystrica is a Slovak football team, based in the town of Považská Bystrica. The club was founded in 1920 as SK Považská Bystrica and played in the Czechoslovak First League four times, the last time being the 1989–90 season, but never in the Corgoň liga, the first Slovak championship.

== Previous names ==
- 1920–1924: ŠK
- 1924–1926: Orol
- 1924–1926: ŠK
- 1933–1936: ŠK Munička
- 1936–1948 : AC Sparta
- 1948–1953 : Sokol Manet
- 1953–1966 : Spartak
- 1966–1968 : Sparta
- 1968–1990 : ZVL
- 1990–1997 : FK Sparta
- 1997–2013 : FK Raven
- 2013– : MŠK

== Club history ==
The main club sponsor Raven company ended support of the football team in Považská Bystrica, even though the club was in first place in Majstrovstvá regiónu 2012/2013 (4th level) competition after the autumn season. So the club was dissolved due to financial crisis after losing its main sponsor.

== Honours ==
Czechoslovakia

- 1.SNL (1st Slovak National football league) (1969–1993)
  - Winners (2): 1969–70, 1988–89
- Slovak Cup (1961–)
  - Runners-up (1): 1989

(Slovak Republic (1939–1945)) Slovak Republic (1939–45)

- Slovak League (1939–44)
  - Winners (1): 1938–39
  - Runners-up (1): 1939–40
  - Third place (2): 1941–41, 1942–43

== Current squad ==
As of 15 February 2026

Note: Flags indicate national team as defined under FIFA eligibility rules; some limited exceptions apply. Players may hold more than one non-FIFA nationality.

No.	Pos.	Nation	Player
3	DF	UKR	Danylo Chaban
4	DF	SVK	Marek Václav
5	DF	SVK	Jan Kubala
7	MF	POL	Dawid Kabat
8	MF	SVK	Denis Potoma
9	MF	CZE	Filip Firbacher (on loan from Hradec Králové)
10	FW	SVK	Adam Gáborík
11	MF	SVK	Anton Sloboda
13	FW	HUN	Péter Kotroczó
14	MF	SVK	Samuel Misík
16	MF	SVK	Maroš Čurik

No.	Pos.	Nation	Player
17	MF	SVK	Roman Zemko
18	MF	POL	Franciszek Liszka
19	FW	SVK	Adrian Celko
20	MF	SVK	Martin Matejčík
21	GK	SVK	Marek Teplan (on loan from Žilina)
22	MF	SVK	Rudolf Božík (on loan from Ružomberok)
23	DF	SVK	Dušan Kucharčík
73	GK	SVK	Matús Bastek
77	FW	SVK	Jakub Tancík
—	GK	SVK	Oliver Minár

For recent transfers, see List of Slovak football transfers summer 2024.
