= Dušan Tóth =

Slovak footballer

Personal information
- Date of birth: 8 February 1971 (age 55)
- Place of birth: Czechoslovakia
- Height: 1.75 m (5 ft 9 in)
- Position: Midfielder

Team information
- Current team: MFK Zvolen (manager)

Senior career*
Years	Team	Apps	(Gls)
1991–1996	Dukla Banská Bystrica	95	(7)
1996–2000	1. FC Košice	77	(4)
2000–2005	Dukla Banská Bystrica	26	(0)
Total		198	(11)

International career
1996–1997	Slovakia	5	(0)

Managerial career
- –2016: Dukla Banská Bystrica (assistant manager)
- 2016–2018: Dukla Banská Bystrica
- 2021-: MFK Zvolen
- * Club domestic league appearances and goals

Dušan Tóth (born 8 February 1971) is a Slovak football manager and a former midfielder who played for Dukla Banská Bystrica, 1. FC Košice and five-times for Slovakia. Currently manager of MFK Zvolen.
