= Tipsport =

Czech betting company

- Industry: Bookmaking
- Founded: 1991; 35 years ago in Beroun, Czech Republic
- Headquarters: Beroun
- Key people: Vratislav Randa (chairperson)
- Revenue: 511,557,000 Czech koruna (2022)
- Operating income: 341,541,000 Czech koruna (2022)
- Net income: 1,748,619,000 Czech koruna (2022)
- Total assets: 3,956,887,000 Czech koruna (2022)
- Number of employees: 34 (2022)
- Website: tipsport.cz

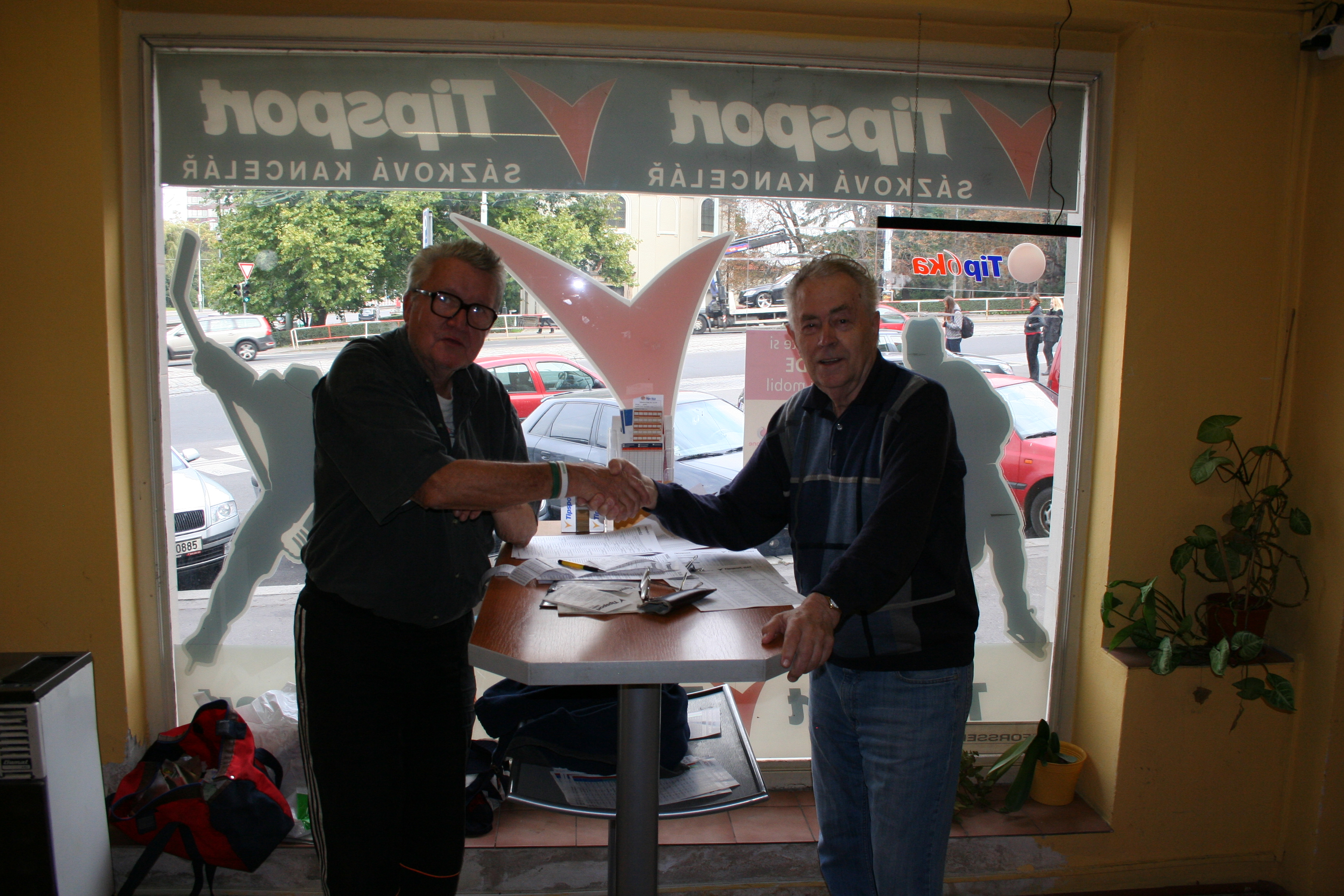
The largest betting agency in the Czech Republic

Tipsport is the largest betting agency in the Czech Republic. The company was founded in 1991 in Beroun by a group of local businessmen led by Vratislav Randa, who is still the chairman of the board. The first branch was opened in May 1991. As of now, the company has almost 700 branches across the Czech Republic. A real milestone for Tipsport was the license for internet betting in 2009. After more than 12 years, internet betting makes a 95% of all bets accepted by the company. In 2017, when the new Czech gambling legislation was adopted, Tipsport opened an online casino named Vegas.

== Sponsoring ==
Tipsport has previously sponsored the Czech Extraliga and Slovak Extraliga, as well as having been the title sponsor of three ice hockey arenas: Sportovní hala Fortuna, Home Credit Arena and Enteria arena.
