= Štadión MŠK Považská Bystrica =

Štadión MŠK
- Interactive map of Štadión MŠK
- Location: Športovcov 2115 Považská Bystrica, Slovakia
- Coordinates: 49°7′1″N 18°25′43″E
- Owner: City of Považská Bystrica
- Capacity: 2,200 – 2,300 (planned)
- Surface: Grass
- Field size: 105 x 68 m

Construction
- Opened: 1975

Tenant
- MŠK Považská Bystrica

Štadión MŠK is a multi-use stadium in Považská Bystrica, Slovakia. It is currently used mostly for football matches and is the home ground of MŠK Považská Bystrica. The stadium is now in reconstruction since 2021. New capacity will be 2,200 – 2,300.
