= FK Humenné =

- Full name: Futbalový Klub Humenné
- Founded: 2003; 23 years ago
- Ground: Štadión Humenné, Humenné, Slovakia
- Capacity: 1,806
- President: Miloš Meričko
- Head coach: Miroslav Nemec
- League: 2. liga
- 2025–26: 3. liga, 1st (promoted)
Home colours	Away colours

FK Humenné is a Slovak association football club located in Humenné. The club was established in 2003 and it plays in 2. liga.

== Honours ==
- 3. Liga (Group East) (1993–)
  - Winners (2): 2020–21, 2025–26

== Colors and badge ==
Its colors are yellow and blue.

== Current squad ==
As of 23 July 2026

Note: Flags indicate national team as defined under FIFA eligibility rules; some limited exceptions apply. Players may hold more than one non-FIFA nationality.

No.	Pos.	Nation	Player
1	GK	SVK	Miloslav Bréda
6	FW	SVK	Matúš Bega
8	MF	SVK	Cyril Vasiľ
16	MF	SVK	František Sitarčík
17	MF	SVK	Marek Zlacký
19	DF	SVK	Igor Komjatý
29	MF	SVK	Viktor Maťaš (captain)
—	DF	SVK	Jakub Straka
—	MF	BRA	Mateus Oliveira

No.	Pos.	Nation	Player
—	DF	SVK	Simeon Kohút
—	FW	UKR	Oleh Vyshnevskyi
—	FW	SVK	Zoran Záhradník
—	MF	SVK	Rastislav Skalka
—	MF	SVK	Dominík Veselý
—	DF	SVK	Nikolas Bajus
—	DF	SVK	Ľubomír Žinčák (on loan from FC Košice)
—	DF	SVK	Patrik Lazár
—	MF	SVK	Lukáš Laurov

For recent transfers, see List of Slovak football transfers summer 2024.

== Notable players ==
The following notable players had international caps for their respective countries. Players whose name is listed in bold represented their countries while playing for Humenné.

- (Central African Republic) Séverin Tatolna

== Managerial history ==
- (Slovakia) Jozef Valkučák (TBA–2017)
- (Serbia) Puniša Memedovič (2017–2018)
- (Slovakia) Vladimír Sivý (January 2019)
- (Slovakia) Jozef Škrlík (February 2019–June 2019)
- (Slovakia) Peter Košuda (June 2019–January 2020)
- (Slovakia) Jozef Škrlík (January 2020–May 2022)
- (Slovakia) Ondrej Desiatnik (June 2022–October 2022)
- (Slovakia) Andrej Čirák (October 2022–November 2022)
- (Slovakia) Jozef Kukulský (December 2022–May 2023)
- (Slovakia) Ľubomír Reiter (June 2023–May 2024)
- (Slovakia) Jozef Škrlík (June 2024–2025)
- (Slovakia) Miroslav Nemec (2025-)
