= Pavel Halouska =

Czech footballer

Personal information
- Date of birth: 23 May 1995 (age 31)
- Place of birth: Brno, Czech Republic
- Height: 1.94 m (6 ft 4 1/2 in)
- Position: Goalkeeper

Team information
- Current team: FC Petržalka
- Number: 33

Youth career
- 2001–2004: TJ MCV Brno
- 2004–2014: FC Zbrojovka Brno

Senior career*
Years	Team	Apps	(Gls)
2014–2020	FC Zbrojovka Brno	13	(0)
2015–2016	→ SK Líšeň (loan)	8	(0)
2016	→ 1. SC Znojmo (loan)	6	(0)
2017	→ 1. SK Prostějov (loan)	13	(0)
2020	SK Líšeň	7	(0)
2020–2021	FK Blansko	23	(0)
2021–2023	Mladá Boleslav	4	(0)
2022	→ Viktoria Žižkov (loan)	10	(0)
2022–2023	→ FK Baník Most-Souš (loan)	26	(0)
2023–	FC Petržalka	85	(0)
- * Club domestic league appearances and goals as of 25 May 2026

Pavel Halouska (born 23 May 1995) is a Czech football player who currently plays for FC Petržalka.
