= Malženice =

- Municipality
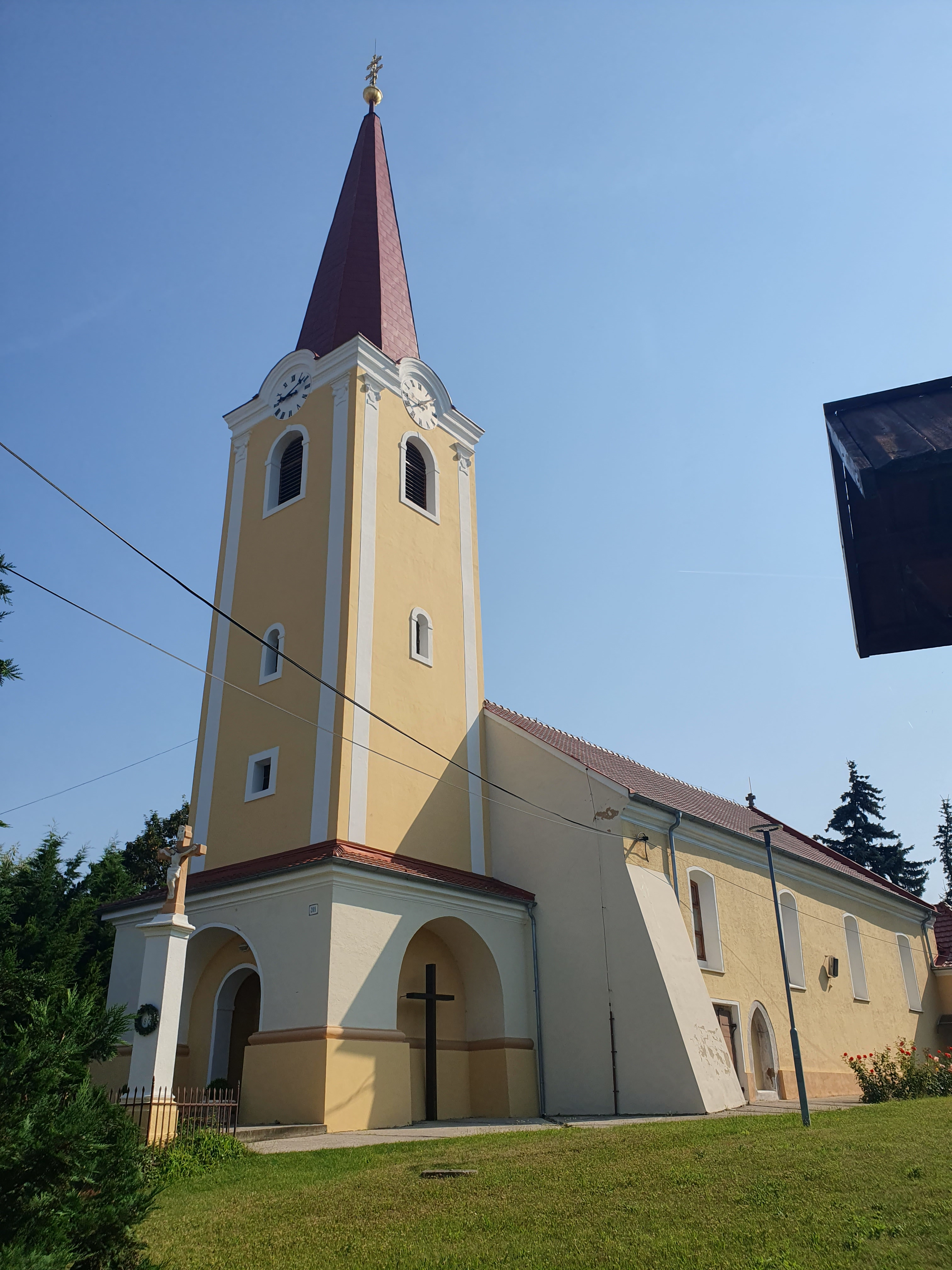

- Flag

- Location of Malženice in the Trnava Region Location of Malženice in Slovakia
- Coordinates: 48.45°N 17.68°E
- Country: Slovakia
- Region: Trnava Region
- District: Trnava District
- First mentioned: 1113

Area
  - Total: 14.85 km^{2} (5.73 sq mi)
- Elevation: 157 m (515 ft)

Population (2025)
  - Total: 1,497
- Time zone: UTC+1 (CET)
  - Summer (DST): UTC+2 (CEST)
- Postal code: 919 29
- Area code: +421 33
- Vehicle registration plate (until 2022): TT
- Website: www.malzenice.sk

Malženice (Hungarian: Maniga) is a village and municipality of Trnava District in the Trnava region of Slovakia.

== Geography ==
The municipality lies at an altitude of 157 metres (515 ft) and covers an area of 14.85 km^{2} (5.73 sq mi) (2025).

== Population ==
Population statistic (10 years)
Year	1995	2005	2015	2025
Count	1025	1284	1474	1497
Difference		+25.26%	+14.79%	+1.56%

Population statistic
Year	2024	2025
Count	1507	1497
Difference		−0.66%

It has a population of 1497 people (31 December 2025).

=== Ethnicity ===
Census 2021 (1+ %)
Ethnicity	Number	Fraction
Slovak	1512	96.92%
Not found out	43	2.75%
Total	1560	

In year 2021 was 1560 people by ethnicity 1512 as Slovak, 43 as Not found out, 9 as Czech, 3 as Other, 3 as Bulgarian, 1 as Serbian, 1 as German and 1 as Hungarian.

Note on population: The difference values of population numbers in the table "Population statistic" and in the sections "Ethnicity" & "Religion" is caused by the use of various statistical methods.

=== Religion ===
Census 2021 (1+ %)
Religion	Number	Fraction
Roman Catholic Church	1174	75.26%
None	271	17.37%
Not found out	39	2.5%
Greek Catholic Church	19	1.22%
Total	1560	

In year 2021 was 1560 people by religion 1174 from Roman Catholic Church, 271 from None, 39 from Not found out, 19 from Greek Catholic Church, 14 from Church of the Brethren, 13 from Evangelical Church, 7 from Ad hoc movements, 6 from Other and not ascertained christian church, 3 from Eastern Orthodox Church, 3 from Christian Congregations in Slovakia, 3 from Other, 2 from Calvinist Church, 2 from Islam, 1 from Paganism and natural spirituality, 1 from Hinduism, 1 from Seventh-day Adventist Church and 1 from Buddhism.
