= Niké (bookmaker) =

Bookmaker based in Slovakia

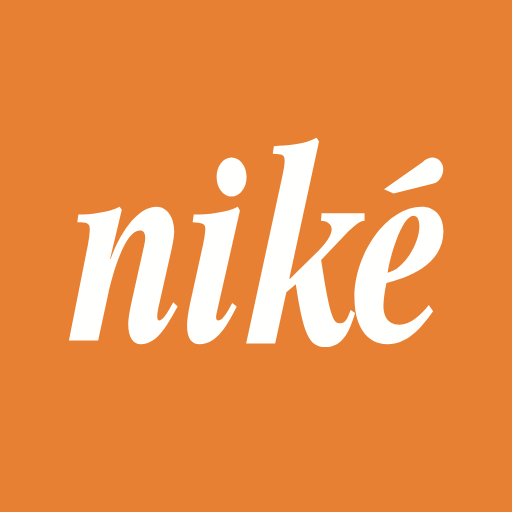
Logo used by the company

Niké (also referred to as Niké je tipovanie in Slovak) is a bookmaker based in Slovakia that was founded on 29 January 1991. It is mainly engaged in betting. The company has over a thousand employees and a network exceeding 600 branches. It is one of the largest companies in the country. On 20 February 2006, the company launched the option of betting through the Internet. Niké owns the online sports news portal Denník Šport and sponsors clubs ŠK Slovan Bratislava, HC Slovan Bratislava and the Slovak Basketball League.

== History ==
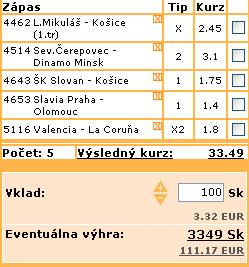
Prepared match list in 2008

Niké was founded shortly after the change in social and economic conditions in Slovakia in the early 1990s. On January 29, 1991, the company opened the first betting office in Slovakia at Mariánska Street in Bratislava. Since its establishment, it has gradually developed as one of the first legal betting offices in the country. During the 1990s, the company expanded its branch network and established itself on the Slovak odds betting market. In 2006, the company responded to the development of digital technologies by launching online betting, thus expanding its services to the internet environment. In June 2023, Niké became the new main sponsor of the Slovak First Football League, with the league's name changing to Niké Liga.

== Activities ==
Niké's main activity is the operation of odds betting, primarily on sporting events. In addition to sports betting, it also allows betting on selected social events. The company operates through brick-and-mortar establishments and an online platform in accordance with applicable gambling legislation.

== Partnerships ==
As of 2026, Niké is the main sponsor of:

- Slovak First Football League
- Slovak First Handball League
- Slovak Men's Volleyball League
- Slovak Women's Volleyball League
- Slovak Basketball League
- ŠK Slovan Bratislava
- FK Železiarne Podbrezová
- 1. FC Tatran Prešov
- FC Košice
- MFK Ružomberok
- FK Inter Bratislava
- HC Slovan Bratislava

== See also ==
- List of bookmakers
