= Stará Ľubovňa FC =

Slovak football club

Stará Ľubovňa Redfox FC
- Full name: Stará Ľubovňa Redfox Football Club
- Founded: 1923
- Ground: Štadión Stará Ľubovňa, Stará Ľubovňa
- Capacity: 2,500 (800 seats)
- President: Štefan Lazorčák
- Head coach: Piotr Kapusta
- League: 3. liga
- 2025–26: 2. liga, 16th of 14 (relegated)
- Website: https://lubovnaredfox.com/
Home colours	Away colours	Traditional colours

Stará Ľubovňa FC, known officially as Stará Ľubovňa Redfox FC for sponsorship reasons, is a Slovak football club, playing in the town of Stará Ľubovňa.

== Namimg history ==
Year	Short name	Full name
1923	ŠK Stará Ľubovňa	Športový klub Stará Ľubovňa
	DŠO Slavoj Stará Ľubovňa	Dobrovoľná športová organizácia Slavoj Stará Ľubovňa
	TJ Skrutkáreň Stará Ľubovňa	Telovýchovná jednota Skrutkáreň Stará Ľubovňa
1999	FK Rekostav Stará Ľubovňa	Futbalový klub Rekostav Stará Ľubovňa
	FK Stará Ľubovňa	Futbalový klub Stará Ľubovňa
2006	MFK Stará Ľubovňa	Mestský futbalový klub Stará Ľubovňa
2007	MFK Goral Stará Ľubovňa	Mestský futbalový klub Goral Stará Ľubovňa
2012	MFK Stará Ľubovňa	Mestský futbalový klub Stará Ľubovňa
2020	MFK ADV Stará Ľubovňa	Mestský futbalový klub ADV Stará Ľubovňa)
2023	Stara Ľubovňa Redfox FC	Stará Ľubovňa Redfox Football Club

== History ==
=== Early years: 1946–1950 ===
The club was founded in 1923. After World War II, the team played at home in the Vrbinky area. In the 1946/1947 season, ŠK Stará Ľubovňa managed to take 1st place in the 2nd class championship. Subsequently, after two qualifying matches with Harichovci, they advanced to the 1st class championship. In 1948, a sports stadium was built. The post-war period was favorable for the development of football. In the 1949/1950 season, ŠK in Stará Ľubovňa fought its way into the regional competition, in which 6 clubs from the Prešov region and 6 from the Košice region played.

=== Post-war period ===
During the existence of Czechoslovakia, the club's greatest success was promotion to the Czechoslovak Second League. It played there in the 1978–79 season. After the dissolution of Czechoslovakia, the club started playing in the Slovak Fifth League. In the 2007–08 season, it had a one-year stint in the Second League.

=== Recent years: 2023–present ===
At the end of the 2023–24 season, the club earned promotion to the 2. Liga for the first time after 17 years. They finished the 2024–25 campaign second-last, with 24 points. However, after the reorganization of the leagues, Redfox would remain in the 2nd league. In the next season season, the club would have to fight for survival again. After 17 rounds, the club from eastern Slovakia was in 16th place, which means direct relegation, but the club's biggest problem is not the results, but the lack of finances. In November 2025, missing payments were reported, which came with a report claiming that Stará Ľubovna footballers had not been paid since August of 2025.

== Stadium ==
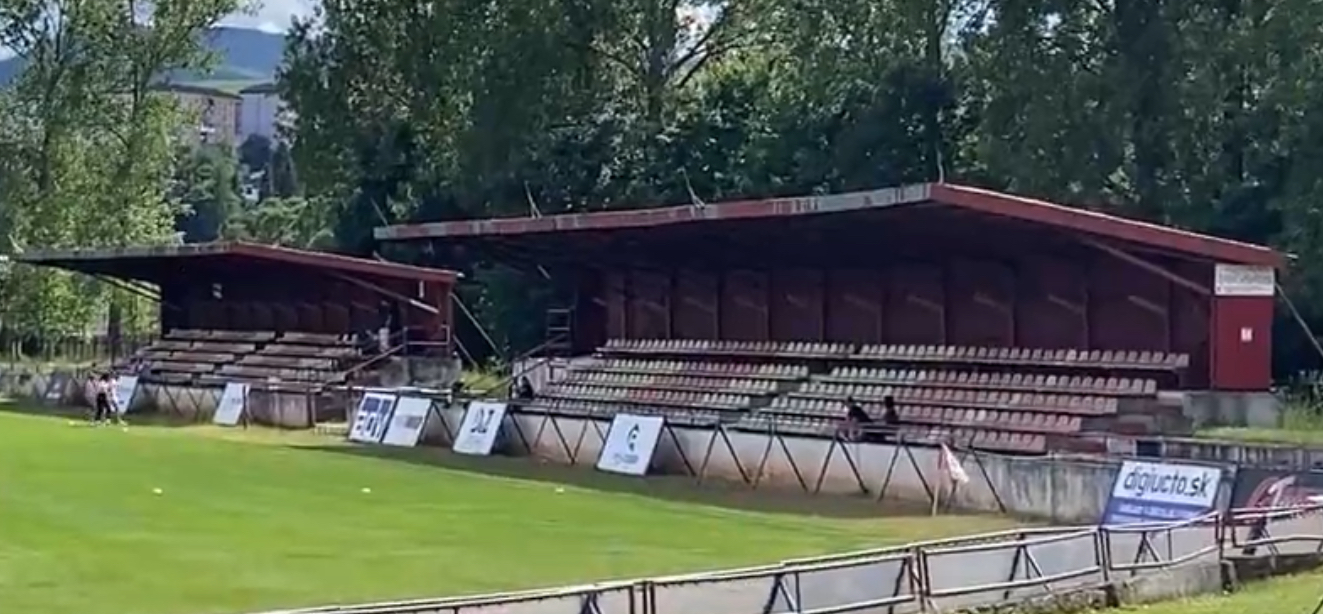
Štadion Stará Ľubovňa.

Stará Ľubovňa play their home games in the Štadion Stará Ľubovňa which has a total capacity of 2,500, of which 800 are seats. The stadium was originally built in 1962. The stadium has been sold out once, in a game against ŠK Lipany.

In 2024, Stará Ľubovňa announced their plans to build a new stadium. It is planned to be finished in 2026.

== Current squad ==
As of 15 August, 2025

Note: Flags indicate national team as defined under FIFA eligibility rules; some limited exceptions apply. Players may hold more than one non-FIFA nationality.

No.	Pos.	Nation	Player
2	DF	NGA	Abuchi Onuoha
3	MF	SVK	Jakub Blichar
5	MF	POL	Fabian Krawczyk
6	MF	SVK	Alex Gdula
7	MF	SVK	Roman Bekö
9	FW	SVK	Samuel Maslej (on loan from Pohronie)
10	MF	CZE	Jakub Kousal
11	MF	SVK	Kamil Karaš

No.	Pos.	Nation	Player
14	MF	SVK	Tomáš Solotruk
20	MF	SVK	Tomas Kaleta
21	DF	SVK	Matúš Capko (captain)
22	DF	GRE	Efstathios Panikidis
23	MF	POL	Eryk Galara
30	GK	SVK	Marek Hamrak
37	GK	POL	Konrad Tokarz (on loan from Sandecja Nowy Sącz)
44	DF	UKR	Maksym Gudak
77	MF	SVK	Lukáš Jendrek

For recent transfers, see List of Slovak football transfers winter 2025–26 .

== Managerial history ==
- (Poland) Piotr Kapusta (January 2023–June 2024)
- (Slovakia) Jozef Kostelník (June 2024–June 2025)
- (Poland) Piotr Kapusta (July 2025–present)
