= Štadión Pasienky =

Multi-purpose stadium in Bratislava, Slovakia

- Pasienky
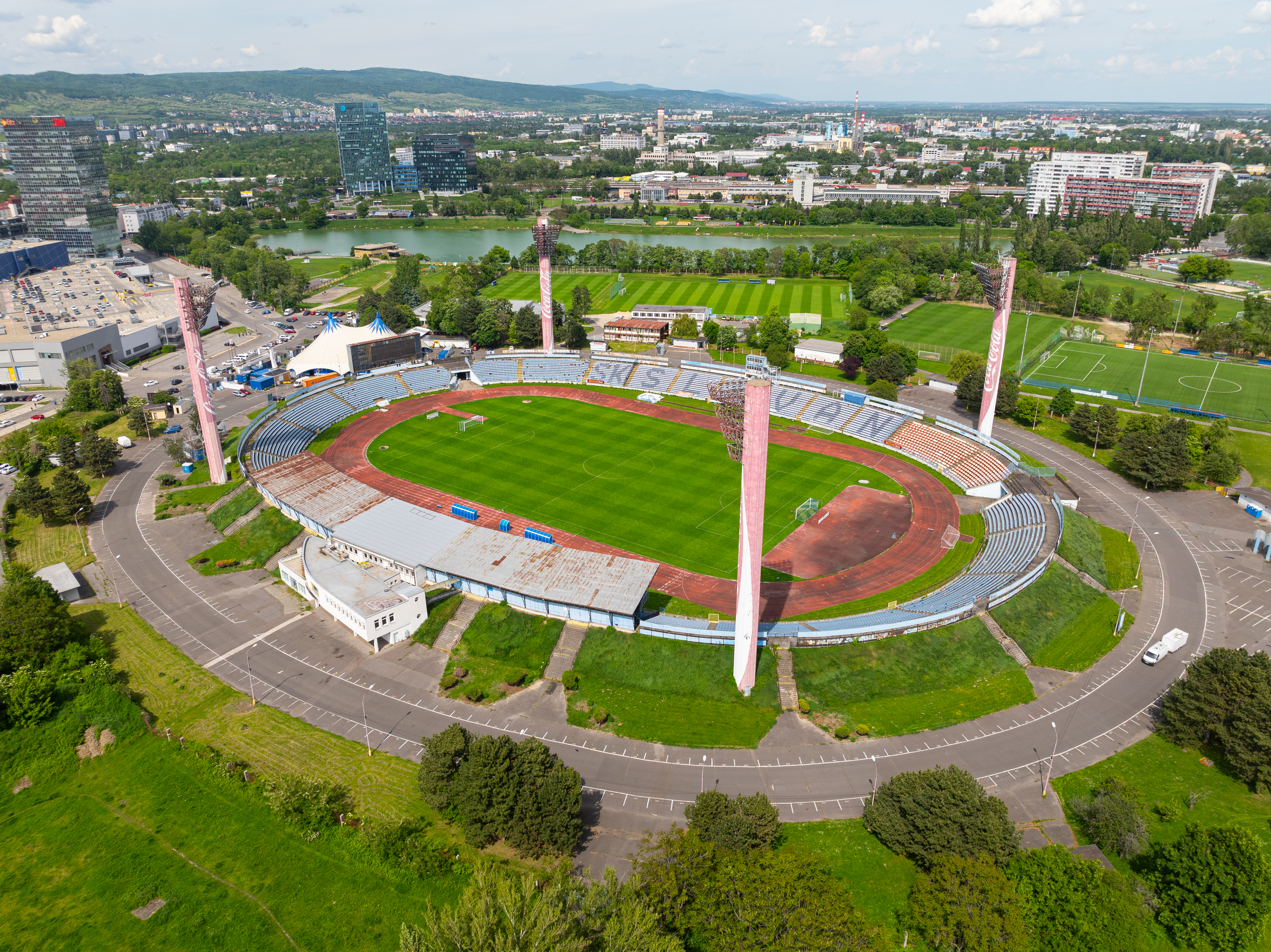
- Interactive map of Štadión Pasienky
- Location: Junácka 10, Bratislava, Slovakia
- Coordinates: 48°09′58″N 17°08′33″E
- Operator: ŠK Slovan Bratislava
- Capacity: 11,591
- Surface: Grass
- Field size: 105 x 68 m

Construction
- Built: 1962
- Renovated: 2010

Tenants
- Inter Bratislava (1962–2009; 2024 - cur.); Petržalka (2008–2010); Slovan Bratislava (2009–2018); ŠK Slovan Bratislava B Slovakia national football team (2009–2012)

Stadion Pasienky is a multi-purpose stadium in Bratislava, Slovakia. The stadium holds 11,591 people. It is used mostly for football matches and was the home ground of Slovan Bratislava from 2009 to 2018. At present, it is used by Slovan's reserve and from the summer of 2024, Inter Bratislava, which has played there for almost its entire existence, returned to the stadium. The intensity of the floodlighting is 1,400 lux.

== History ==
Pasienky Stadium (Slovak for "Pasture Stadium") was built in 1962 as a multi-purpose stadium. It was the home ground of FK Inter Bratislava for most of its history, until 2009. It was also used for Athletics Grand Prix of Slovakia (IAAF). Its current seating capacity is 11,500 people.

== International tournaments ==
The stadium hosted four matches of the 2000 UEFA European Under-21 Championship.
Group B

27 May 2000
18:00

| Slovakia | 2–1 | Turkey |
|---|---|---|
| Greško 6'; Čišovský 67' | Report | Dursun 63' |

Štadión Pasienky, Bratislava
Referee: Karl-Erik Nilsson (Sweden)
29 May 2000
20:30

| Italy | 1–1 | Slovakia |
|---|---|---|
| Baronio 17' | Report | Babnič 73' |

Štadión Pasienky, Bratislava
Referee: Dieter Schoch (Switzerland)
1 June 2000
20:30

| England | 0–2 | Slovakia |
|---|---|---|
| | Report | Babnič 67'; Németh 74' |

Štadión Pasienky, Bratislava
Referee: Herbert Fandel (Germany)

Third place play-off

4 June 2000
17:00

| Spain | 1–0 | Slovakia |
|---|---|---|
| Ferrón 58' | Report |

Štadión Pasienky, Bratislava
Referee: Leslie Irvine (Northern Ireland)

== International matches ==
Štadión Pasienky has hosted 5 competitive and 4 friendly matches of the Slovakia national football team.

| 5 June 2010 International Friendly | Slovakia | 3–0 | Costa Rica | Bratislava, Slovakia |
| 17:00; Match 177 | Douglas Sequeira 16' (o.g.); Róbert Vittek 47'; Stanislav Šesták 88' (pen.) | | | Stadium: Štadión Pasienky; Attendance: 10,074; Referee: Stefan Messner (Austria) |

| 11 August 2010 International Friendly | Slovakia | 1–1 | Croatia | Bratislava, Slovakia |
| 20:30; Match 182 | Miroslav Stoch 50' | | Nikica Jelavić 54' | Stadium: Štadión Pasienky; Attendance: 6,366; Referee: Radek Matejek (Czech Republic) |

| 3 September 2010 2012 UEFA Euro; Qualifying Group B | Slovakia | 1–0 | Macedonia | Bratislava, Slovakia |
| 20:30; Match 183 | Filip Hološko 90+1' | | Vance Sikov (yellow card) 66' (yellow-red card) 85' | Stadium: Štadión Pasienky; Attendance: 5,980; Referee: Claudio Circhetta (Switzerland) |

| 17 November 2010 International Friendly | Slovakia | 2–3 | Bosnia and Herzegovina | Bratislava, Slovakia |
| 17:00; Match 187 | Filip Šebo 3'; Peter Grajciar 63' | | Haris Medunjanin 28'; Miralem Pjanić 50'; Edin Džeko 60' | Stadium: Štadión Pasienky; Attendance: 7,822; Referee: Tomasz Mikulski (Poland) |

| 4 June 2011 2012 UEFA Euro; Qualifying Group B | Slovakia | 1–0 | Andorra | Bratislava, Slovakia |
| 20:15; Match 191 | Miroslav Karhan 63' | | | Stadium: Štadión Pasienky; Attendance: 4,300; Referee: Lorenc Jemini (Albania) |

| 11 September 2012 2014 FIFA World Cup; Qualifying Group G | Slovakia | 2–0 | Liechtenstein | Bratislava, Slovakia |
| 20:15; Match 202 | Marek Sapara 36'; Martin Jakubko 78' | | | Stadium: Štadión Pasienky; Attendance: 4,326; Referee: Simon Lee Evans (Wales) |

| 12 October 2012 2014 FIFA World Cup; Qualifying Group G | Slovakia | 2–1 | Latvia | Bratislava, Slovakia |
| 20:15; Match 203 | Marek Hamšík 6' (pen.); Marek Sapara 10' | | Māris Verpakovskis 84' (pen.) | Stadium: Štadión Pasienky; Attendance: 4,012; Referee: Danny Makkelie (Netherlands) |

| 16 October 2012 2014 FIFA World Cup; Qualifying Group G | Slovakia | 0–1 | Greece | Bratislava, Slovakia |
| 20:30; Match 204 | | | Dimitris Salpingidis 63' | Stadium: Štadión Pasienky; Attendance: 7,694; Referee: William Collum (Scotland) |

== Concerts ==
Depeche Mode performed at the stadium four times: the first was on 11 June 2006, during their Touring the Angel. The second was on 22 June 2009, during their Tour of the Universe, in front of a crowd of 31,500 people. The third was on 25 May 2013, during their Delta Machine Tour, in front of a sold out crowd of 29,112 people. The 2006 and 2009 shows were recorded for the group's live albums projects Recording the Angel and Recording the Universe, respectively.

=== List of concerts ===
| Date | Performer(s) | Reference |
|---|---|---|
| 8 June 1993 | Metallica | |
| 11 June 2006 | Depeche Mode | |
| 29 June 2008 | Carlos Santana | |
| 22 June 2009 | Depeche Mode | |
| 29 May 2010 | KISS | |
| 25 May 2013 | Depeche Mode | |
| 20 May 2017 | Depeche Mode | |

== Transport ==
Stadium Pasienky is located in the third district of Bratislava, Slovakia. The Stadium can be approached by Tram, Trolleybus and Bus.

| Service | Stop | Line | Walking distance from Pasienky Stadium |
|---|---|---|---|
| Tram | MiÚ Nové Mesto | 4 | 300 m |
| Bus | MiÚ Nové Mesto | 50, 51, 98, N53, X4 | 300 m |
| Trolleybus | Sabinovská | 60, 64 | 200 m |
| Bus | Sabinovská | 39, 53, 61, 163, N74 | 200 m |
| Bus | Bajkalská | 39, 53, 61, 63, 66, 74, 75, 78, 98, 163, N74 | 400 m |
| Regional Bus | Bajkalská | 506, 520, 540, 550, 565, 599, 610, 620, 622, 630, 632 | 400 m |
| Trolleybus | Bajkalská | 60, 64 | 400 m |
