= MFK Zvolen =

Slovak football club

- Full name: MFK Zvolen
- Founded: 1902; 124 years ago
- Ground: Futbal Aréna Zvolen, Zvolen
- Capacity: 1,870
- Chairman: Jozef Ježík
- Head coach: Dušan Tóth
- League: 2.liga
- 2025–26: 2. liga, 2nd of 16
- Website: http://www.mfklokomotivazvolen.sk/
Home colours	Away colours

MFK Zvolen is a Slovak football team, based in the town of Zvolen. The club was founded in 1902. Zvolen currently plays its home matches at the MFK Zvolen Stadium.

== History ==
=== Early years ===
In 1902, MFK Zvolen was founded by a group of students under the name Zólyomi SE. From 1938 to 1944, it played in the Slovak First League. During the existence of Czechoslovakia, the club's greatest success was promotion to the Czechoslovak Second League, where it played in 1955–1956 and 1980–1981.

=== Recent years ===
In summer 2014, MFK Lokomotíva Zvolen was merged with TJ Baník Ružiná.

In the 2022/2023 season, the club finished in 1st place in the 4th League - Central and was promoted to the 3rd League - West. Zvolen won the league the following season and was promoted to the 2nd League.

== Stadium ==
Zvolen plays its home games at the Futbal Aréna Zvolen. It has a size of 105 x 68 m, with 4 small football fields next to it. It has a capacity of 1,870, of which 1,790 are seats. The stadium's record attendance was before its reconstruction. The 1999 Slovak Cup final between Slovan Bratislava and Banská Bystrica had an attendance of 10,048 spectators. The stadium's original capacity was 12,910 spectators. The reconstruction cost around 2 million euros. The stadium was the venue for the 2022 UEFA European Under-19 Championship.

== Current squad ==
As of 17 August 2026

Note: Flags indicate national team as defined under FIFA eligibility rules; some limited exceptions apply. Players may hold more than one non-FIFA nationality.

No.	Pos.	Nation	Player
1	GK	SVK	Milan Mráz
2	DF	SVK	Lukáš Filipiak
3	DF	SVK	Erik Gaško
4	DF	NGA	Abubakar Bello
6	MF	SVK	Jan Nemcok
7	DF	SVK	Adam Oravec (on loan from Žilina)
8	MF	SVK	Miroslav Gono
10	MF	SVK	Tomas Kajsin
11	FW	NGA	Peter Onuoha
12	DF	SVK	Lukas Dvorsky (on loan from Ružomberok)
13	MF	ALB	Kristi Qose

No.	Pos.	Nation	Player
16	DF	NGA	Stephen Adayilo
17	MF	SVK	Matúš Körös
19	MF	SVK	Lukas Biely
22	GK	SVK	Branko Maruniak (on loan from Dukla Banská Bystrica)
29	FW	NGA	Kelechi Izuakor
30	DF	SVK	Matthias Leitl (on loan from Mladá Boleslav)
31	GK	SVK	Simon Kocka
33	DF	SVK	Bernard Petrák
38	FW	SVK	Lazar Vrekic
44	DF	SVK	Timotej Záhumenský

For recent transfers, see List of Slovak football transfers summer 2025.

== Notable players ==
Had international caps for their respective countries. Players whose name is listed in bold represented their countries while playing for Zvolen.

- (Slovakia) Peter Grajciar
- (Albania) Kristi Qose
- (Slovakia) Jakub Sylvestr

== Notable managers ==
- (Slovakia) Milan Albrecht
- (Slovakia) Anton Jánoš (2014–17)
- (Slovakia) Marián Süttö (2017–?)
- (Slovakia) Dušan Tóth (2021-)
