= ŠK Slovan Bratislava B =

- Full name: Športový Klub Slovan Bratislava B
- Founded: 1919
- Ground: Štadión Pasienky, Bratislava
- Capacity: 11,591
- Manager: Vladimír Gála
- League: 2. liga
- 2025–26: 9th
Home colours	Away colours

Športový Klub Slovan Bratislava B, commonly known as Slovan Bratislava B, is the reserve team of Slovak First Football League club ŠK Slovan Bratislava. The team currently plays in the 2. liga.

== Stadium ==
Slovan Bratislava B plays home matches at Štadión Pasienky in Bratislava.

== Current squad ==
As of 21 July 2026

Note: Flags indicate national team as defined under FIFA eligibility rules; some limited exceptions apply. Players may hold more than one non-FIFA nationality.

No.	Pos.	Nation	Player
1	GK	SVK	David Balog
2	MF	SVK	Tomas Kachnic
3	DF	SUI	Ledion Ukaj
4	DF	SVK	Matúš Minka
7	FW	SVK	Martin Klaučo
8	MF	SVK	Maximilián Marko
9	FW	SVK	Jakub Marko
11	MF	SVK	Marcel Plavnik
12	FW	ESP	Mamadou Traore
13	MF	SVK	Tobiáš Gabriš
16	FW	ENG	Manasse Kianga
17	FW	UKR	Stanislav Koval
17	DF	CRO	Daniel Jakolic
18	MF	SVK	Sebastian Fronko
19	DF	SVK	Robert Tománek

No.	Pos.	Nation	Player
20	MF	UKR	Eduard Kozyk
21	FW	CRO	Vito Čilič
23	MF	SVK	Matúš Koseček
24	FW	CZE	Oskar Jelinek
30	GK	SVK	Matús Spisák
30	GK	CZE	Martin Naimann
—	MF	SVK	Samuel Gresko
—	MF	CRO	Patrik Veselić
—	FW	SVK	Norbert Burda
—	FW	CZE	Jakub Rehak (on loan from FK Železiarne Podbrezová)
—	DF	SVK	Dominik Balog
—	FW	SVK	Alex Velky
—	MF	SVK	Peter Holocsy
—	DF	SVK	Adam Svec
—	MF	SVK	Pavol Lembak
—	FW	SVK	Martin Mišovič
