= 2003 Slovak Cup final =

- Event: 2002–03 Slovak Cup
ŠK Slovan Bratislava	FK Matador Púchov
1	2
- After extra time
- Date: 8 May 2003
- Venue: Vojtech Schottert Stadium, Topoľčany
- Referee: Ladislav Gádoši
- Attendance: 4,356

The 2003 Slovak Cup final, was the final match of the 2002–03 Slovak Cup, the 34th season of the top cup competition in Slovak football. The match was played at the Vojtech Schottert Stadium in Topoľčany on 8 May 2003 between ŠK Slovan Bratislava and FK Matador Púchov. Matador Púchov defeated Slovan Bratislava 2-1.

== Route to the final ==
ŠK Slovan Bratislava		Round	FK Matador Púchov
Opponent	Result	2002–03 Slovak Cup	Opponent	Result
Slovan Bratislava B	2–0	First Round	DAC Dunajská Streda	2–0
MFK Topvar Horná Nitra Topoľčany	2–1	Second Round	1. FC Košice	3–0
ŽP Šport Podbrezová	1–0	Quarter-finals	Tatran Prešov	3–0
MŠK Žilina	0–2 away, 4–1 home	Semi-finals	ŠK Petrochema Dubová	1–1 home, 2–2 away

== Match ==
=== Details ===
8 May 2003
16:00 CEST

Slovan Bratislava	1–2 (a.e.t.)	Matador Púchov
Hornyák 115'	Report	Perniš 111'; Breška 116'

Vojtech Schottert Stadium, Topoľčany
Attendance: 4,356
Referee: Ladislav Gádoši

SLOVAN BRATISLAVA:
GK	--	(Serbia and Montenegro) Vojin Prole
RB	--	(Slovakia) Ladislav Pecko
CB	--	(Czech Republic) David Homoláč
CB	--	(Slovakia) Peter Dzúrik		(yellow card) 75'
LB	--	(Slovakia) Michal Demeter		(yellow card) 73'
RM	--	(Slovakia) Vladimír Bednár		(substituted off) 66'
DM	--	(Slovakia) Peter Polgár
DM	--	(Slovakia) Benjamin Vomáčka	(yellow card) 66'	(substituted off) 81'
LM	--	(Slovakia) Zsolt Hornyák
ST	--	(Slovakia) Ján Šlahor		(substituted off) 106'
ST	--	(Slovakia) Róbert Vittek		(substituted off) 42'
Substitutions:
CF	--	(Slovakia) Erik Takáč	(substituted in) 42'	(substituted off) 68'
ST	--	(Slovakia) Tomáš Sloboda		(substituted in) 106'
ST	--	(Slovakia) Stanislav Šesták		(substituted in) 68'
Manager:
Dušan Radolský

MATADOR PÚCHOV:
GK	--	(Czech Republic) Tomáš Bernady
RB	--	(Slovakia) Peter Hricko		(yellow card) 81'	(substituted off) 77'
CB	--	(Slovakia) Mário Zavaterník		(yellow card) 21'
CB	--	(Slovakia) Peter Vavrík
LB	--	(Slovakia) Peter Čvirik
CM	--	(Slovakia) Ivan Belák		(substituted off) 98'
CM	--	(Slovakia) Ivan Kováč
CM	--	(Slovakia) Milan Jambor		(yellow card) 72'
AM	--	(Bosnia and Herzegovina) Almir Gegić		(yellow card) 45'
CF	--	(Slovakia) Mário Breška		(substituted off) 68'
FW	--	(Slovakia) Jozef Mužlay		(substituted off) 63'
Substitutions:
CM	--	(Slovakia) Peter Vavrík		(substituted in) 72'
FW	--	(Slovakia) Ľubomír Škripec		(substituted in) 98'
ST	--	(Slovakia) Ľuboš Perniš	(substituted in) 63'	(yellow card) 110'
Manager:
František Komňacký

Assistant referees:
(Slovakia) Tibor Jančovič
(Slovakia) Martin Balko
