= 2001–02 Slovak Cup =

Tournament details
- Country: Slovakia
- Teams: 36

Final positions
- Champions: Koba Senec
- Runners-up: Matador Púchov

The 2001–02 Slovak Cup was the 33rd season of Slovakia's annual knock-out cup competition and the ninth since the independence of Slovakia. It began on 25 July 2001 with the matches of preliminary round and ended on 8 May 2002 with the final. The winners of the competition earned a place in the qualifying round of the UEFA Cup. Inter Bratislava were the defending champions.

== Preliminary round ==
The first legs were played on 25 and 26 July 2001. The second legs were played on 2 August 2001.

Team 1	Agg.	Team 2	1st leg	2nd leg
Baloň	4–8	Vrakuňa Bratislava	2–3	1–5
Petrochema Dubová	4–3	Turňa nad Bodvou	2–1	2–2
Slovan Bratislava B	5–2	Zlaté Moravce	5–0	0–2
Žiar nad Hronom	1–0	Tesla Stropkov	0–0	1–0

== First round ==
The ten games were played on 18 September 2001 and the six games were played on 2 and 3 October 2001.

Team 1	Score	Team 2
Steel Trans Ličartovce	1–2	Tatran Prešov
MŠK Fomat Martin	0–2	BSC JAS Bardejov
Žiar nad Hronom	1–1 (3–4 p)	FK Čaňa
Rimavská Sobota	3–2	Dukla Banská Bystrica
SH Senica	1–1 (4–3 p)	Artmedia Petržalka
DAC Dunajská Streda	1–1 (3–4 p)	VTJ Topoľčany
Petrochema Dubová	2–4	Matador Púchov
HFC Humenné	0–2	SCP Ružomberok
Podbrezová	0–1	MŠK Žilina
ŠKP Devin	1–1 (3–5 p)	Ozeta Dukla Trenčín
NCHZ Nováky	3–0	1. FC Košice
Koba Senec	2–2 (4–2 p)	Spartak Trnava
Vrakuňa Bratislava	1–0	Slovenský Grob
Slovan Bratislava B	1–1 (3–2 p)	ZTS Dubnica nad Váhom
Baník Prievidza	0–1	Slovan Bratislava
FC Nitra	0–1	Inter Bratislava

== Second round ==
The seven games were played on 9 October 2001 and the match SH Senica – Ozeta Dukla Trenčín was played on 10 October 2001.

Team 1	Score	Team 2
FK Čaňa	2–1	VTJ Topoľčany
BSC JAS Bardejov	4–1	Tatran Prešov
Inter Bratislava	2–0	Slovan Bratislava B
Matador Púchov	3–0	Slovan Bratislava
Rimavská Sobota	3–0	Vrakuňa Bratislava
Koba Senec	2–0	SCP Ružomberok
MŠK Žilina	4–2	NCHZ Nováky
SH Senica	1–1 (5–4 p)	Ozeta Dukla Trenčín

== Quarter-finals ==
The games were played on 23 October 2001.

23 October 2001	Koba Senec	3–1	Inter Bratislava	Senec
14:00	Sikorjak 34'; Novák 54'; Bellla 87'	Report	Micsovics 50'	Stadium: Štadión VTJ Koba Senec; Attendance: 1,900; Referee: Anton Stredák

23 October 2001	Rimavská Sobota	0–0 (2–4 p)	MŠK Žilina	Rimavská Sobota
14:00		Report		Stadium: Na Záhradkách Stadium; Attendance: 3,600; Referee: Eduard Cichý

23 October 2001	Matador Púchov	5–1	FK Čaňa	Púchov
14:00	Perniš 3', 74' (pen.), 88' (pen.); Kohút 45' (o.g.); Čižmár 90' (o.g.)	Report	Maťaš 72'	Stadium: Mestský štadión Púchov; Attendance: 3,600; Referee: Vladimír Chládek

23 October 2001	BSC JAS Bardejov	1–1 (5–3 p)	SH Senica	Bardejov
14:00	Didik 66'	Report	Truska 69'	Stadium: Mestský štadión Bardejov; Attendance: 550; Referee: Pavol Olšiak

== Semi-finals ==
The first legs were played on 19 March 2002. The second legs were played on 9 April 2002.

=== First legs ===
19 March 2002	Matador Púchov	1–0	MŠK Žilina	Púchov
15:00	Breška 5'	Report		Stadium: Mestský štadión Púchov; Attendance: 3,600; Referee: Jozef Kačenga

19 March 2002	BSC JAS Bardejov	1–0	Koba Senec	Bardejov
15:00	Čekan 9'	Report		Stadium: Mestský štadión Bardejov; Attendance: 1,389; Referee: Jozef Ďuriš

=== Second legs ===
9 April 2002	MŠK Žilina	0–2 (0–3 agg.)	Matador Púchov	Žilina
15:30		Report	Mužlay 33'; Škripec 45'	Stadium: Štadión pod Dubňom; Attendance: 2,795; Referee: Ladislav Gádoši

9 April 2002	Koba Senec	3–0 (3–1 agg.)	BSC JAS Bardejov	Senec
15:30	Takáč 48', 65'; Volf 56'	Report		Stadium: Štadión VTJ Koba Senec; Attendance: 1,928; Referee: Pavol Olšiak

== Final ==
8 May 2002
16:00 CEST

Matador Púchov	1–1 (a.e.t.)	Koba Senec
Breška 79'	Report 1 Report 2	Marek Lukáč 49'
Penalties
Vavrík (penalty scored); Škripec (penalty missed); Bugala (penalty scored); Kraush (penalty missed)	2–4	(penalty missed) Hesek; (penalty scored) Martin Lukáč; (penalty scored) Volf; (penalty scored) Beňo; (penalty scored) Bella

Štadión FK Raven, Považská Bystrica
Attendance: 4,584
Referee: Anton Stredák
