= 2002–03 2. Liga (Slovakia) =

2. liga
- Season: 2002–03
- Champions: FK Dukla Banská Bystrica
- Promoted: FK Dukla Banská Bystrica
- Relegated: ŠK Petrochema Dubová; FK Čaňa; ŠK Slovan Bratislava B; ŠKP Devín; TJ Veľké Leváre
- Matches: 240
- Goals: 638 (2.66 per match)

The 2002–03 season of the Slovak Second Football League (also known as 2. liga) was the tenth season of the league since its establishment. It began on 20 July 2002 and ended on 5 June 2003.

== League standing ==
| Pos | Team | Pld | W | D | L | GF | GA | GD | Pts | Promotion or relegation |
|---|---|---|---|---|---|---|---|---|---|---|
| 1 | Dukla Banská Bystrica (C, P) | 30 | 21 | 6 | 3 | 53 | 18 | +35 | 69 | Promotion to Corgoň Liga |
| 2 | Steel Trans Ličartovce | 30 | 19 | 4 | 7 | 59 | 33 | +26 | 61 | |
| 3 | VTJ Koba Senec | 30 | 18 | 5 | 7 | 48 | 27 | +21 | 59 | |
| 4 | Rimavská Sobota | 30 | 16 | 8 | 6 | 51 | 34 | +17 | 56 | |
| 5 | Podbrezová | 30 | 13 | 9 | 8 | 45 | 24 | +21 | 48 | |
| 6 | Topvar HN Topoľčany | 30 | 12 | 8 | 10 | 45 | 25 | +20 | 44 | |
| 7 | Petrochema Dubová (R) | 30 | 12 | 6 | 12 | 41 | 52 | −11 | 42 | Relegation to 3. Liga |
| 8 | DAC 1904 Dunajská Streda | 30 | 11 | 8 | 11 | 39 | 40 | −1 | 41 | |
| 9 | Tatran Prešov | 30 | 11 | 6 | 13 | 40 | 37 | +3 | 39 | |
| 10 | SH Senica | 30 | 11 | 6 | 13 | 29 | 37 | −8 | 39 | |
| 11 | 1. HFC Humenné | 30 | 11 | 6 | 13 | 30 | 42 | −12 | 39 | |
| 12 | FC Nitra | 30 | 11 | 5 | 14 | 36 | 29 | +7 | 38 | |
| 13 | FK Čaňa (R) | 30 | 8 | 5 | 17 | 32 | 59 | −27 | 29 | Relegation to 3. Liga |
| 14 | Slovan Bratislava B (R) | 30 | 7 | 6 | 17 | 33 | 51 | −18 | 27 | Relegation to 3. Liga |
| 15 | ŠKP Devín (R) | 30 | 6 | 6 | 18 | 37 | 65 | −28 | 24 | Relegation to 3. Liga |
| 16 | Veľké Leváre (R) | 30 | 3 | 6 | 21 | 20 | 65 | −45 | 15 | Relegation to 3. Liga |

Source: RSSSF.org
Rules for classification: 1) points; 2) goal difference; 3) number of goals scored.
(C) Champions; (P) Promoted; (R) Relegated

== See also ==
- 2002–03 Slovak Superliga
