= Želetice =

Želetice may refer to places in the Czech Republic:

- Želetice (Hodonín District), a municipality and village in the South Moravian Region
- Želetice (Znojmo District), a municipality and village in the South Moravian Region
