= List of 1. FC Tatran Prešov seasons =

Following is a list of 1. FC Tatran Prešov seasons.

== Slovakia ==
Season	Division (Name)	Pos./Teams	Pl.	W	D	L	GS	GA	P	Domestic Cup	Europe		Notes
1993–1994	1st (Mars Superliga)	4/(12)	32	10	14	8	47	43	34	Runner-up			
1994–1995	1st (Mars Superliga)	9/(12)	32	9	10	13	42	49	37		UC	1/16 finals (second round)	
1995–1996	1st (Mars Superliga)	5/(12)	32	12	7	13	34	36	43				
1996–1997	1st (Mars Superliga)	6/(16)	30	12	7	11	37	38	43	Runner-up			
1997–1998	1st (Mars Superliga)	10/(16)	30	9	9	12	29	39	36				
1998–1999	1st (Mars Superliga)	8/(16)	30	11	10	9	38	35	43				
1999–2000	1st (Mars Superliga)	6/(16)	30	14	5	11	38	42	47				
2000–2001	1st (Mars Superliga)	7/(10)	36	10	10	16	44	54	40				
2001–2002	1st (Mars Superliga)	10/(10)	36	8	7	21	35	66	40				
2002–2003	2nd (1. liga)	9/(16)	30	11	6	13	40	37	39	1/4 finals			
2003–2004	2nd (1. liga)	3/(16)	30	15	7	8	54	35	52	1/8 finals			
2004–2005	2nd (1. liga)	5/(16)	30	12	8	10	38	33	44	1/32 finals			
2005–2006	2nd (1. liga)	5/(16)	30	15	7	8	37	22	52	1/32 finals			
2006–2007	2nd (1. liga)	5/(12)	36	16	14	6	55	25	62	1/8 finals			
2007–2008	2nd (1. liga)	1/(12)	33	23	8	2	64	14	77	1/4 finals			
2008–2009	1st (Corgoň Liga)	7/(12)	33	10	11	12	40	50	41	1/16 finals			
2009–2010	1st (Corgoň Liga)	8/(12)	33	11	5	17	32	38	38	1/8 finals			
2010–2011	1st (Corgoň Liga)	11/(12)	33	9	6	18	30	49	33	1/16 finals			
2011–2012	1st (Corgoň Liga)	10/(12)	33	7	12	14	23	35	33	1/4 finals			
2012–2013	1st (Corgoň Liga)	12/(12)	33	8	9	16	21	41	33	1/16 finals			
