= Martin Fabuš =

Slovak footballer (born 1976)

Personal information
- Full name: Martin Fabuš
- Date of birth: 11 November 1976 (age 49)
- Place of birth: Trenčín, Czechoslovakia
- Height: 1.87 m (6 ft 1 1/2 in)
- Position: Striker

Team information
- Current team: Slovakia U19 (manager)

Youth career
- 1986–1991: Skloobal Nemšová
- 1991–1994: Slovan Bratislava

Senior career*
Years	Team	Apps	(Gls)
1994–1995	Slovan Bratislava	1	(0)
1995–2000	Ozeta Dukla Trenčín	75	(39)
1999	→ Sigma Olomouc (loan)	15	(1)
2000–2001	Karlsruher SC	32	(7)
2001–2003	AS Trenčín	42	(17)
2003–2004	MŠK Žilina	38	(17)
2004–2006	Dukla Banská Bystrica	29	(5)
2005–2006	AS Trenčín	28	(3)
2006–2007	→ ViOn Zlaté Moravce (loan)	14	(5)
2007	Schwadorf	8	(5)
2007–2009	Ruch Chorzów	47	(8)
2010–2013	Slovan Nemšová		
2013–2014	Münichreith		
2014–2015	Slovan Trenčianske Teplice		
2016	Záblatie		
2016	Slovan Skalka nad Váhom		

International career
1998–2002	Slovakia	25	(5)

Managerial career
- 2012–2021: AS Trenčín (youth)
- 2021–2023: AS Trenčín (U19)
- 2023–2024: Slovakia U18
- 2024–: Slovakia U19
- * Club domestic league appearances and goals

Martin Fabuš (born 11 November 1976) is a Slovak professional football manager and former player who played as a striker. He is currently in charge of the Slovakia under-19 national team.

He had played for Slovan Bratislava, Karlsruher SC, ASK Schwadorf and Ruch Chorzów. He played in the Czech Gambrinus liga for Sigma Olomouc. He spent most of his career playing for Trenčín, he reached his playing peak while playing under Stanislav Griga.

== Honours ==
Slovan Bratislava

- Slovak First Football League: 1994–95

Žilina

- Slovak First Football League: 2002–03, 2003–04
- Slovak Super Cup: 2003

Dukla Bánska Bystrica

- Slovak Cup: 2004–05

Individual

- Slovak First Football League top scorer: 1998–99, 2002–03
