= Vladimir Bednar =

Vladimir Bednar may refer to:

- Vladimír Bednář (born 1948), Czech ice hockey player
- Vladimír Bednár (born 1978), Slovak footballer

== See also ==
- Vladimir Bodnar (born 1942), Transnistrian politician
