= Peter Hricko =

Slovak footballer (born 1981)

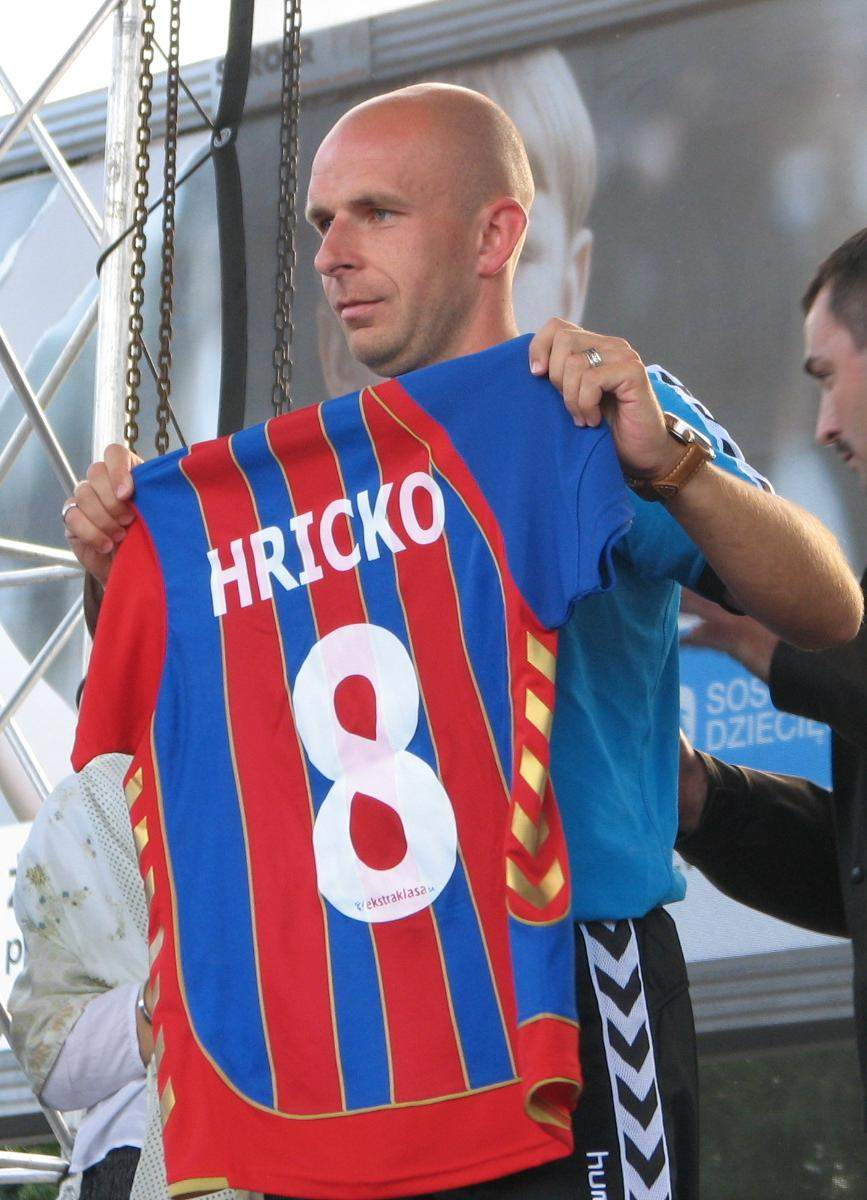

Personal information
- Date of birth: 25 July 1981 (age 45)
- Place of birth: Margecany, Czechoslovakia
- Height: 1.77 m (5 ft 9 1/2 in)
- Position: Right-back

Team information
- Current team: TJ OFC Gabčíkovo
- Number: 6

Senior career*
Years	Team	Apps	(Gls)
1999–2000	Tatran Prešov	1	(0)
2000–2001	ZŤS Martin		
2002	Humenné		
2002–2006	Matador Púchov	105	(1)
2006	Sarpsborg	1	(0)
2007–2008	Humenné	21	(1)
2008–2011	Polonia Bytom	69	(0)
2011–2013	Pogoń Szczecin	42	(1)
2013	Pogoń Szczecin II	3	(0)
2013–	TJ OFC Gabčíkovo	0	(0)
- * Club domestic league appearances and goals as of 25 September 2013

Peter Hricko (born 25 July 1981) is a Slovak professional footballer who currently plays from Slovak Fourth League club TJ OFC Gabčíkovo.

== Career ==
In June 2011, he joined Pogoń Szczecin on a two-year contract. In September 2013, he joinedTj Ofc gabčíkovo and in that year he played in 19 games.

== Honours ==
Matador Púchov

- Slovak Cup: 2002–03
