= Stanislav Šesták =

Slovak footballer (born 1982)

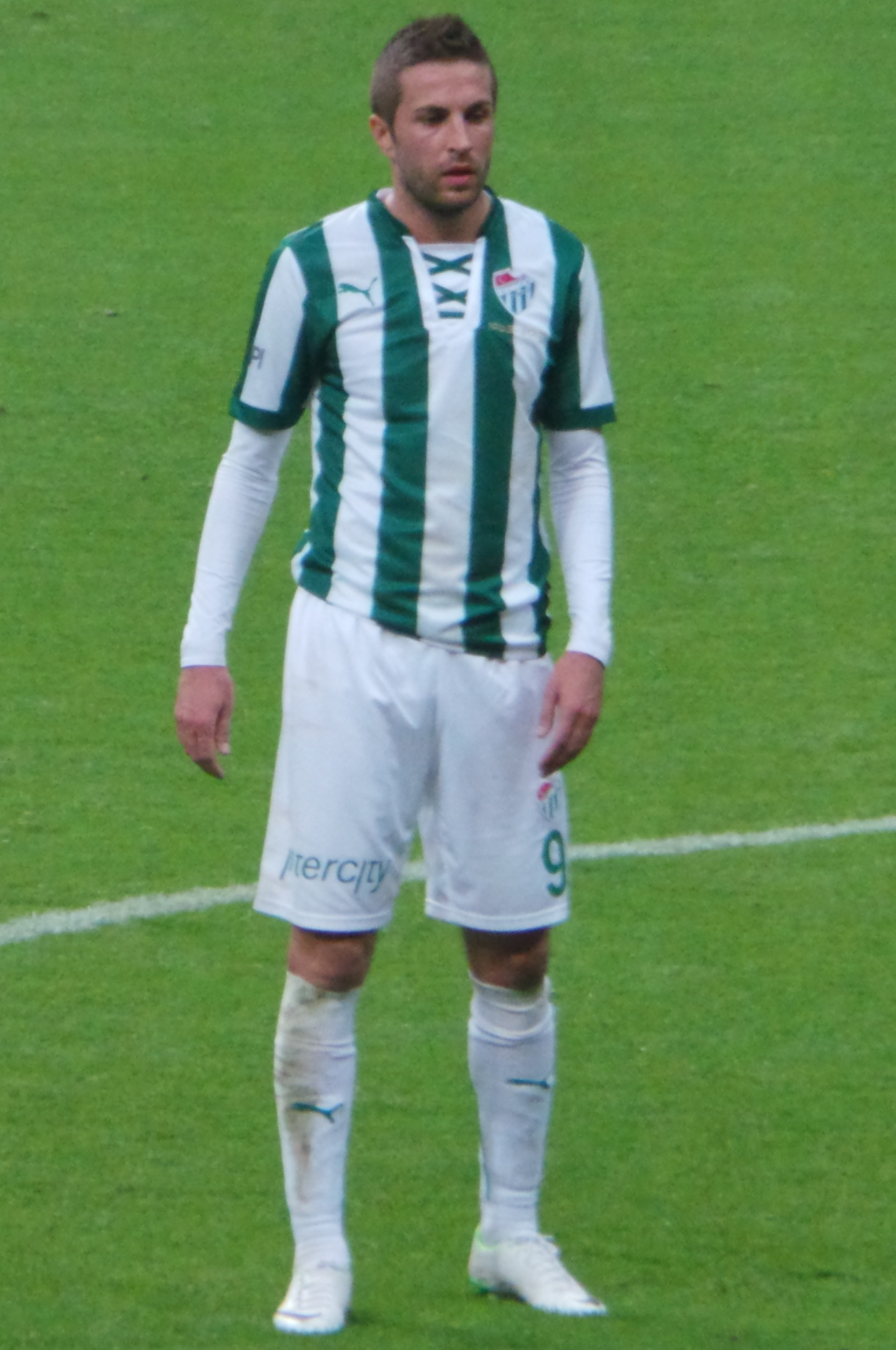
- Šesták with Bursaspor in 2014

Personal information
- Date of birth: 16 December 1982 (age 43)
- Place of birth: Demjata, Czechoslovakia
- Height: 1.80 m (5 ft 11 in)
- Positions: Forward; winger

Team information
- Current team: Tatran Prešov (manager); FK Demjata (player)

Youth career
- FK Demjata
- Tatran Prešov

Senior career*
Years	Team	Apps	(Gls)
2000–2001	Tatran Prešov	42	(9)
2002–2003	Slovan Bratislava	58	(6)
2004–2007	MŠK Žilina	99	(49)
2007–2011	VfL Bochum	86	(28)
2010–2011	→ Ankaragücü (loan)	24	(10)
2011	Ankaragücü	0	(0)
2011–2014	Bursaspor	79	(12)
2014–2015	VfL Bochum	27	(9)
2015–2016	Ferencváros	30	(9)
2017–2019	Poprad	55	(45)
2019–2021	FK Demjata		
Total		500	(177)

International career
2000–2001	Slovakia U18	4	(4)
2001–2003	Slovakia U21	7	(0)
2004–2016	Slovakia	66	(13)

Managerial career
- 2017: Poprad (player-manager)
- 2017–2019: Poprad (player-assistant)
- 2020–2021: Poprad (assistant)
- 2021–2022: Tatran Prešov
- 2023-2026: Tatran Prešov (Sp.Director)
- * Club domestic league appearances and goals

Stanislav Šesták (Slovak pronunciation: [ˈstaɲislaw ˈʂestaːk]; born 16 December 1982) is a Slovak retired football striker, manager, as well as a club official and a local politician. Šesták last managed Slovakia's oldest club Tatran Prešov in 3. Liga - East.

== Club career ==
=== Slovakia ===
Šesták made his first football steps in Demjata, where he played one season in local club FK Demjata, in team U15. His parents took him to youth camp of 1. FC Tatran Prešov. This was his first step to professional football. Officially, Šesták started his career at Tatran Prešov. In December 2001, he moved to Slovan Bratislava. He only played two seasons in Bratislava and then moved on to MŠK Žilina in December 2003. In the 2005–06 season, Šesták took with 17 goals the fourth place in the top goalscorer list of the Slovak league. One year later his club MŠK Žilina won the Slovak championship. Šesták scored 15 goals in that season and was second in the Slovak top goalscorer list.

=== VfL Bochum ===
On 7 June 2007, Šesták joined German Bundesliga side VfL Bochum. He signed a four-year contract at the club until 2011. At Bochum he was expected to replace the Greek international Theofanis Gekas who, after winning the top scorer crown in the previous season, had been transferred to Bayer Leverkusen.

Šesták made a total of 86 appearances for VfL Bochum and scored 28 goals (17 assists) during his three-year spell with the Ruhr valley outfit. In the 2007–08 season he was with 13 goals and 9 assists the third-best scorer in the league, behind Bayern Munich's Luca Toni and Werder Bremen's Diego. On 11 April 2009, Šesták marked within 27 minutes against TSG 1899 Hoffenheim a hat-trick (due to the half-time break between the first two goals, however, it could be counted as flawless).

=== In Turkey ===
After Bochum's relegation to the 2. Bundesliga he was loaned for the 2010–11 season for one year to Turkish side MKE Ankaragücü. During his one-year spell, he racked up 24 appearances for the club, scoring ten goals (two assists). In June 2011, Šesták was transferred permanently to the club for an undisclosed transfer fee. However, due to the financial troubles of that club, Bochum had (as of January 2013) never received the entire transfer fee and MKE Ankaragücü still owed them about €2.374 million, Only three months later, in September 2011, Šesták moved to league rivals Bursaspor where he signed a three-year contract.

=== Ferencváros ===
On 16 June 2015, Šesták signed for Hungarian top club Ferencvárosi TC.

On 2 April 2016, he became Hungarian League champion with Ferencváros after losing to Debreceni VSC 2–1 at the Nagyerdei Stadion in the 2015–16 Nemzeti Bajnokság I season.

== International career ==
Šesták began his youth career in 2000. During his youth career he was a member of Slovak under-18 and under-21 national teams. On 18 August 2004, Šesták debuted for the Slovak senior national team in a 3-1 victory over Luxembourg, coming on as a substitute for Szilárd Németh for the last six minutes of the game. Šesták scored his first senior international goals against San Marino on 13 October 2007.

During the 2010 FIFA World Cup qualification campaign, Šesták became the top scorer of his team with 6 goals in 6 matches and helped to qualify for Slovakia's first major tournament ever. On 15 October 2008, he scored two quick goals in the closing minutes against Poland to turn the game around from 0–1. Šesták also scored the first goal in a match against the Czech Republic on 1 April 2009. As a part of the Slovak squad at 2010 FIFA World Cup, he played in every match of Slovakia in the group stage.

During the era of coaching duo Griga and Hipp, Šesták was mostly ignored by them and was nominated only for one friendly match against Poland on 26 May 2012, where he played in the first 57 minutes.

On 14 August 2013, Šesták returned to international football under the new coach of Slovak national team Ján Kozák, scoring a goal in a 1–1 away draw with Romania. He also helped his country to qualify for their first UEFA European Championship in 2016. He has appeared in three matches during their successful qualification campaign and scored a game-closing goal against Belarus on 12 October 2014 in the 92nd minute. It was also his last international goal.

Šesták was also a member of their final squad at UEFA Euro 2016. He was on the bench during the tournament until Round of 16 against Germany on 26 June 2016, which they lost 0-3. Šesták came on as a substitute for Michal Ďuriš in the 64th minute. After the match, he officially announced his retirement from international football. At the time of his retirement, he was the sixth best goalscorer of Slovakia with 13 goals in 66 matches.

== Coaching and later career ==
At the end of April 2017, Šesták was appointed playing caretaker manager of FK Poprad until the end of the season. He continued as a part of the staff for the 2017-18 season, functioning as a playing assistant manager.

In the summer 2019, he retired from professional football and was instead hired as sporting director of FK Poprad. He also returned to play for his former youth club FK Demjata.

== Other activities ==
In October 2022, Šesták became a city councillor in Prešov, supporting mayoral candidate, fellow official of Tatran Prešov and a former international football referee Ľuboš Micheľ. He ran as a joint candidate of HLAS-SD and Aliancia in city's first electoral precinct.

== Private life ==
Šesták is married to his wife Milka Šestáková. The couple has three children. In December 2022, Šesták's family home in Demjata burned down.

== Career statistics ==
=== Club ===
As of 10 June 2017

Appearances and goals by club, season and competition
Club	Season	League			National cup (Note: Includes Slovak Cup, DFB-Pokal, Turkish Cup, Hungarian Cup)		League cup (Note: Includes DFB-Ligapokal, Ligakupa)		Continental		Other		Total	
Club	Season	Division	Apps	Goals	Apps	Goals	Apps	Goals	Apps	Goals	Apps	Goals	Apps	Goals
Tatran Prešov	2000–01	Slovak Superliga	28	5			—		—		—			
Tatran Prešov	2001–02	Slovak Superliga	14	4			—		—		—			
Tatran Prešov	Total		42	9										
Slovan Bratislava	2001–02	Slovak Superliga	18	1			—		—		—			
Slovan Bratislava	2002–03	Slovak Superliga	26	3			—		—		—			
Slovan Bratislava	2003–04	Slovak Superliga	14	2			—		—		—			
Slovan Bratislava	Total		58	6										
MŠK Žilina	2003–04	Slovak Superliga	16	4			—		—		—			
MŠK Žilina	2004–05	Slovak Superliga	27	13			—		2	0	—			
MŠK Žilina	2005–06	Slovak Superliga	29	17			—		2	0	—			
MŠK Žilina	2006–07	Slovak Superliga	27	15			—		—		—			
MŠK Žilina	Total		99	49			0	0	4	0	0	0		
VfL Bochum	2007–08	Bundesliga	33	13	2	0	—		—		—		35	13
VfL Bochum	2008–09	Bundesliga	24	9	2	1	—		—		—		26	10
VfL Bochum	2009–10	Bundesliga	29	6	1	0	—		—		—		30	6
VfL Bochum	Total		86	28	5	1	0	0	0	0	0	0	91	29
MKE Ankaragücü (loan)	2010–11	Süper Lig	24	10	1	1	—		—		—		25	11
MKE Ankaragücü	2011–12	Süper Lig	0	0	0	0	—		—		—		0	0
Bursaspor	2011–12	Süper Lig	31	1	5	0	—		0	0	4 (Note: Appearances in Süper Lig Europe League play-offs)	1	40	2
Bursaspor	2012–13	Süper Lig	29	7	6	0	—		3	1	—		38	8
Bursaspor	2013–14	Süper Lig	19	4	8	3	—		2	0	—		29	7
Bursaspor	Total		79	12	19	3	0	0	5	1	4	1	107	17
VfL Bochum	2014–15	2. Bundesliga	27	9	2	0	—		—		—		29	9
Ferencvárosi	2015–16	Nemzeti Bajnokság I	24	9	4	1	—		2	0	—		30	10
Ferencvárosi	2016–17	Nemzeti Bajnokság I	6	0	0	0	—		2	0	—		8	0
Ferencvárosi	Total		30	9	4	1	0	0	4	0	0	0	38	10
FK Poprad	2016–17	2. Liga	2	1	3	2	—		—		4 (Note: 2. Liga relegation round and relegation playoffs)	6	9	9
FK Poprad	2017–18	2. Liga	0	0	0	0	—		—		—		0	0
Career total			447	133			0	0	13	1	8	7		

=== International ===
Scores and results list Slovakia's goal tally first, score column indicates score after each Šesták goal.

List of international goals scored by Stanislav Šesták
No.	Date	Venue	Opponent	Score	Result	Competition
1	13 October 2007	Mestský štadión Dubnica, Dubnica nad Váhom, Slovakia	San Marino	2–0	7–0	UEFA Euro 2008 qualifying
2	13 October 2007	Mestský štadión Dubnica, Dubnica nad Váhom, Slovakia	San Marino	6–0	7–0	UEFA Euro 2008 qualifying
3	26 February 2008	Tsirion Stadium, Limassol, Cyprus	Hungary	1–1	1–1	Friendly
4	11 October 2008	Stadio Olimpico, Serravalle, San Marino	San Marino	1–0	3–1	2010 FIFA World Cup qualifying
5	15 October 2008	Štadión Pasienky, Bratislava, Slovakia	Poland	1–1	2–1	2010 FIFA World Cup qualifying
6	15 October 2008	Štadión Pasienky, Bratislava, Slovakia	Poland	2–1	2–1	2010 FIFA World Cup qualifying
7	1 April 2009	Generali Arena, Prague, Czech Republic	Czech Republic	1–0	2–1	2010 FIFA World Cup qualifying
8	5 September 2009	Štadión Pasienky, Bratislava, Slovakia	Czech Republic	1–0	2–2	2010 FIFA World Cup qualifying
9	9 September 2009	Windsor Park, Belfast, Northern Ireland	Northern Ireland	1–0	2–0	2010 FIFA World Cup qualifying
10	17 November 2009	Štadión pod Dubňom, Žilina, Slovakia	Chile	1–1	1–2	Friendly
11	5 June 2010	Štadión Pasienky, Bratislava, Slovakia	Costa Rica	3–0	3–0	Friendly
12	14 August 2013	Arena Națională, Bucharest, Romania	Romania	1–1	1–1	Friendly
13	12 October 2014	Borisov Arena, Borisov, Belarus	Belarus	3–1	3–1	UEFA Euro 2016 qualifying

== Honours ==
MŠK Žilina

- Slovak Super Liga: 2003-04, 2006-07

Ferencvaros

- Nemzeti Bajnokság I: 2015–16
- Magyar Kupa: 2015–16
