= Vladimír Cifranič =

Slovak footballer and manager

Personal information
- Full name: Vladimír Cifranič
- Date of birth: 10 January 1975 (age 51)
- Place of birth: Czechoslovakia
- Height: 1.84 m (6 ft 0 in)
- Position: Defender

Youth career
- Košice

Senior career*
Years	Team	Apps	(Gls)
1993–1997	Košice	39	(0)
1997	Sparta Prague	1	(0)
1997–1998	Košice	4	(0)
1998–2001	AS Trenčín	77	(1)
2001–2003	Slovan Bratislava	4	(0)
2001–2002	→ AS Trenčín (loan)	20	(0)
2002–2003	→ 1. FC Košice (loan)	23	(0)
2004	Odra Wodzisław	1	(0)
2004	Crystal Lednické Rovne		
2005	Zemplín Michalovce		
2005–2006	ViOn Zlaté Moravce		
2006	Slavoj Trebišov		
2007	Zemplín Michalovce		
2008	Trenčianske Stankovce		
2009–2013	FC Valašské Příkazy		
2013–?	MFK Stará Turá		

Managerial career
- 2013–2017: AS Trenčín (assistant)
- 2017–2018: AS Trenčín
- 2018: AS Trenčín (assistant)
- 2018–2019: AS Trenčín
- 2019–2020: Púchov
- 2020: Železiarne Podbrezová
- 2021: Námestovo
- 2022–2023: Púchov
- 2023: ViOn Zlaté Moravce
- 2024: Pohronie (assistant)
- 2024: Železiarne Podbrezová
- 2024–2025: Železiarne Podbrezová (assistant)
- 2025–2026: Tatran Prešov
- 2026-: FK Inter Bratislava
- * Club domestic league appearances and goals

Vladimír Cifranič (born 10 January 1975) is a Slovak professional football manager and former player who played as a defender. He was most recently the manager of Tatran Prešov.

== Coaching career ==
In September 2013, Cifranič was appointed as the assistant manager of AS Trenčín under manager Martin Ševela. On 12 September 2017, manager Martin Ševela was fired and Cifranič took over his position together with Roman Marčok. In the summer 2018, the club hired Ricardo Moniz as the new manager, with Cifranič under him as his assistant. Moniz re-signed already after 3 months, and Cifranič was once again appointed as the new manager on 29 October 2018. After his own request, Cifranič resigned on 20 March 2019.

== Honours ==
=== Player ===
Košice

- Slovak First Football League: 1996–97, 1997–98
