= Michal Gottwald =

Slovak footballer

Personal information
- Full name: Michal Gottwald
- Date of birth: 21 April 1981 (age 45)
- Place of birth: Čadca, Czechoslovakia
- Height: 1.87 m (6 ft 1 1/2 in)
- Position: Forward

Youth career
- Dukla Banská Bystrica

Senior career*
Years	Team	Apps	(Gls)
1999–2000	OFI	3	(0)
2001	Agios Nikolaos	19	(8)
2002–2005	Žilina	88	(21)
2006	Legia Warsaw	5	(1)
2007	Slovan Bratislava	8	(1)
2007–2010	ŽP Šport Podbrezová	31	(9)
2008–2009	→ Dukla Banská Bystrica (loan)	9	(1)
2010	Karviná	12	(1)
2011	→ Slávia Staškov (loan)		
2011–2014	Slávia Staškov		
- * Club domestic league appearances and goals

Michal Gottwald (born 29 April 1981) is a Slovak former professional footballer who played as a forward.

== Club career ==
Gottwald has previously played for Dukla Banská Bystrica, MŠK Žilina and Slovan Bratislava in the Slovak Superliga. He had a spell in the Super League Greece with OFI and in the Greek Beta Ethniki with Agios Nikolaos F.C. He also had a brief spell with Legia Warsaw in the Polish Ekstraklasa.

== Honours ==
Žilina

- Slovak First Football League: 2001–02, 2002–03, 2003–04
- Slovak Super Cup: 2003

Legia Warsaw

- Ekstraklasa: 2005–06
