= FK Čaňa =

Slovak football club

- Full name: Futbalový klub Čaňa
- League: 4. Liga
- 2018–19: 5th of 16, 4. Liga Juh (South)

FK Čaňa is a Slovak football team, based in the village of Čaňa.

== Cup history ==
They reached the second round of the 2000–01 Slovak Cup before losing 1–4 to eventual runners-up SCP Ružomberok, and the quarter-finals the following year, again losing to the eventual runners-up, Matador Púchov, by a score of 1–5. This success qualified them for the first round in 2002–03 but they were knocked out straight away. They also reached the first round in 2004.

== Naming history ==
- 1923 – ŠK Čaňa (Športový klub Čaňa)
- 1963 – TJ Družstevník Čaňa (Telovýchovná jednota Družstevník Čaňa)
- 1996 – FK Hydina Čaňa (Futbalový klub Hydina Čana)
- 2004 – FK Čaňa (Futbalový klub Čaňa)
