= Mário Zavaterník =

Slovak footballer

Personal information
- Full name: Mário Zavaterník
- Date of birth: 21 April 1978 (age 48)
- Place of birth: Lučenec, Czechoslovakia
- Height: 1.87 m (6 ft 2 in)
- Position: Centre back

Senior career*
Years	Team	Apps	(Gls)
?–1999	Banská Bystrica		
2000–2005	Púchov	99	(1)
2006–2008	Inter Bratislava		
2008–2009	Senica		
- * Club domestic league appearances and goals as of 23 March 2012

Mário Zavaterník (born 21 April 1978 in Lučenec) is a Slovak football defender.
