= Pavol Strapáč =

Slovak footballer and manager (1957–2021)

Personal information
- Full name: Pavol Strapáč
- Date of birth: 28 June 1957
- Place of birth: Czechoslovakia
- Date of death: 29 December 2021 (aged 64)

Senior career*
Years	Team	Apps	(Gls)
- ZVL Žilina
- NH Ostrava
- FK Čadca
- SCC Siemerink

Managerial career
- FK Čadca
- ZVL Kysucké Nové Mesto
- REaMOS Kysucký Lieskovec
- FC Biocel Vratimov
- FK Čadca
- FC Biocel Vratimov
- 2008–2010: FK Púchov
- 2010–2011: Tatran Liptovský Mikuláš
- 2011–2016: Námestovo
- 2016–: Čadca
- * Club domestic league appearances and goals as of 13 January 2017

Pavol Strapáč (28 June 1957 – 29 December 2021) was a football player from Slovakia and former manager of MŠK Námestovo. He played ten seasons at ZVL Žilina as well as five seasons with NH Ostrava.

== Managing career ==
Strapáč took up his first management position in the Czech Republic in September 2001 at FC Biocel Vratimov in the Moravian–Silesian Football League.
