= František Komňacký =

Czech footballer and manager (born 1951)

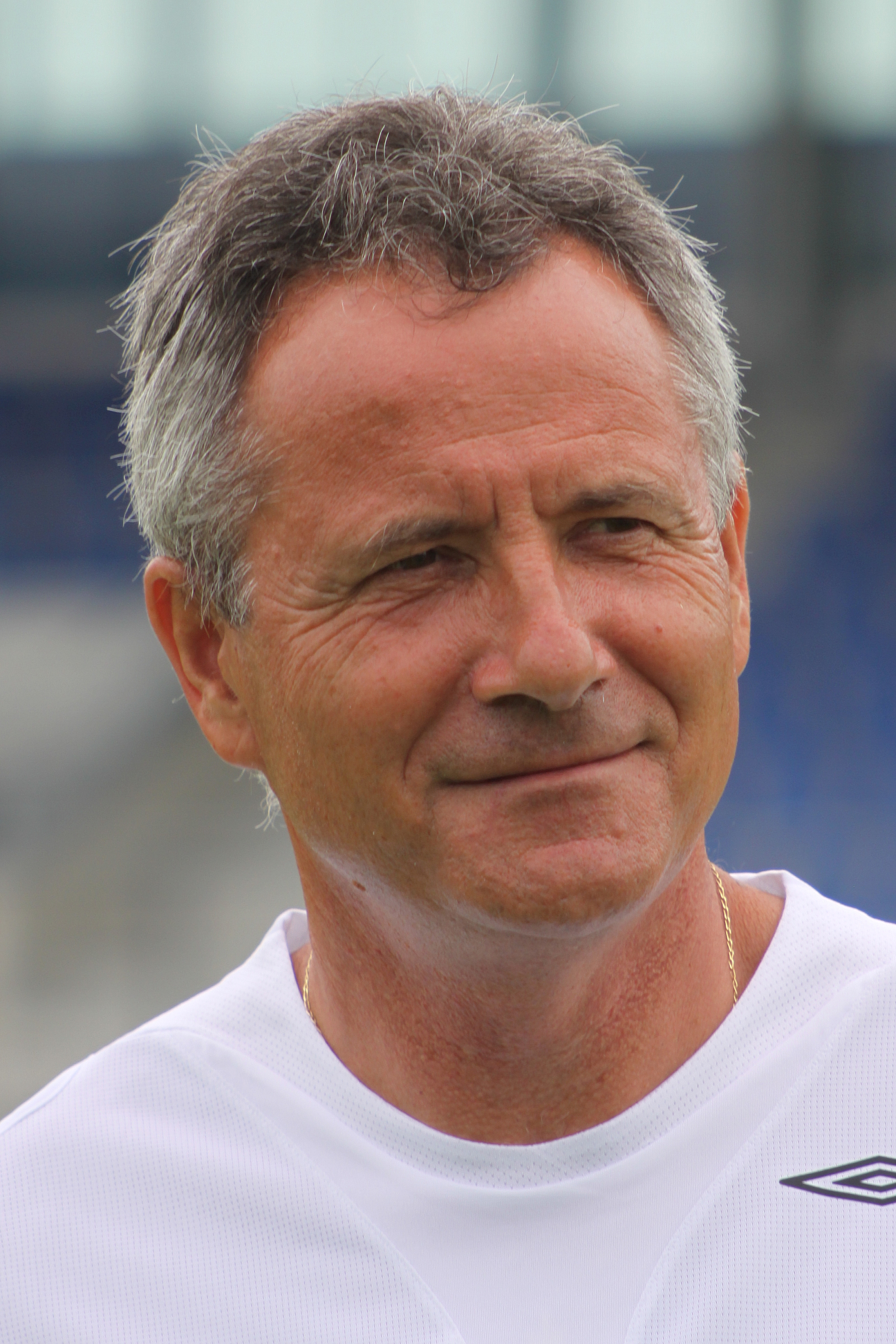

Personal information
- Date of birth: 15 November 1951 (age 74)
- Place of birth: Želetice, Czechoslovakia
- Position: Midfielder

Youth career
- 1967–1969: Jiskra Kyjov

Senior career*
Years	Team	Apps	(Gls)
1969–1970	Jiskra Kyjov		
1970–1974	Neftyanik Volgograd		
1974–1981	Jiskra Kyjov		
1982–1983	Sigma Hodonín		
1984–1993	Drnovice		
1994–1997	Sokol Vřesovice		

Managerial career
- 1986–1988: Drnovice
- 1988–1994: Drnovice (assistant)
- 1994–1995: Slavia Kroměříž
- 1995–1997: Tatran Poštorná
- 1997–2001: 1. FC Synot
- 2001–2002: Zlín
- 2002: Žilina
- 2002–2003: Púchov
- 2003–2004: Baník Ostrava
- 2005–2007: MFK Ružomberok
- 2007: SKA Rostov-on-Don
- 2007–2012: Jablonec
- 2012–2013: Vysočina Jihlava
- 2013–2014: Baník Ostrava
- 2015–2017: Hodonín
- * Club domestic league appearances and goals

František Komňacký (born 15 November 1951) is a Czech former football manager and player.

== Career ==
As a player, Komňacký played for regional clubs from South Moravia, his native region. In 1970, he went to Russia to study pedagogy and played four years until his graduation for Neftyanik Volgograd. After his return he played again for regional teams but in 1978 also began his managerial career, he then led the youth team of Jiskra Kyjov.

His first work as a head manager was at FK Drnovice in 1986–1988, he then coached Hanácká Slavia Kroměříž and Tatran Poštorná.

In 1997, he began work at 1. FC Synot and advanced with the team to the Gambrinus liga in 2000. He then led FK Zlín and MŠK Žilina. In the 2002–03 season Komňacký led Matador Púchov and won the Slovak Cup with them. For the next season he returned to the Czech Republic to work at Silesian club Baník Ostrava.

Baník led the league almost the whole 2003–04 season and won the Gambrinus liga for the first time in the history of the independent Czech Republic. Six years later Komňacký remembered that season: "I spent there a wonderful season, which I will not forget. I have that club and region in my heart."

Afterwards Komňacký went back to Slovakia and won both the Slovak Cup and the Corgoň Liga with MFK Ružomberok in the 2005–06 season. In October 2007 he started coaching FK Jablonec. In the 2009–10 season, Jablonec finished second in the Gambrinus liga for the first time in its history.

He received several awards for his achievements. In 2004, he was awarded the Rudolf Vytlačil Award for the Czech Coach of the Year, for leading Baník Ostrava to the national championship. In 2009, he was awarded the Czech Coach of the Year award for a progress he made with FK Jablonec. In 2010, he was again awarded the Rudolf Vytlačil Award for the Czech Coach of the Year, for leading FK Jablonec to the historic success of runner-up position in the 2009–10 season.

In January 2010 he signed a contract extension to keep him at Jablonec until the end of June 2011.

In the summer of 2012, Komňacký left Jablonec after nearly five years in charge, joining Gambrinus liga newcomers Vysočina Jihlava.

== Honours ==
=== Managerial ===
1. FC Synot

- Czech Second League: 1999–00

Matador Púchov

- Slovak Cup: 2002–03

Baník Ostrava

- Gambrinus liga: 2003–04

MFK Ružomberok

- Slovak First Football League: 2005–06
- Slovak Cup: 2005–06
