= 2003–04 Slovak Superliga =

Corgoň Liga
- Season: 2003–04
- Dates: 19 July 2003 – 8 June 2004
- Champions: MŠK Žilina
- Relegated: Slovan Bratislava
- Champions League: MŠK Žilina
- UEFA Cup: Dukla Banská Bystrica; Artmedia Petržalka
- Intertoto Cup: Spartak Trnava; ZTS Dubnica
- Matches played: 180
- Goals scored: 449 (2.49 per match)
- Top goalscorer: Roland Števko (22 goals)
- Average attendance: ▼3,154

The 2003–04 Slovak First Football League (known as the Slovak Corgoň Liga for sponsorship reasons) was the 11th season of first-tier football league in Slovakia, since its establishment in 1993. It began on 19 July 2003 and ended on 8 June 2004. MŠK Žilina were the defending champions.

== Teams ==
A total of 10 teams was contested in the league, including 9 sides from the 2002–03 season and one promoted from the 2. Liga.

Relegation for 1. FC Košice to the 2003–04 2. Liga was confirmed on 31 May 2003. The one relegated team were replaced by Dukla Banská Bystrica.

=== Stadiums and locations ===
Location of teams in 2003–04 Corgoň Liga

Team	Home city	Stadium	Capacity
Artmedia Petržalka	Petržalka	Štadión Petržalka	7,500
Dukla Banská Bystrica	Banská Bystrica	SNP Stadium	10,000
Inter Slovnaft Bratislava	Bratislava	Štadión Pasienky	12,000
Laugaricio Trenčín	Trenčín	Štadión na Sihoti	4,500
Matador Púchov	Púchov	Mestský štadión	6,614
MFK Ružomberok	Ružomberok	Štadión MFK Ružomberok	4,817
MŠK Žilina	Žilina	Štadión pod Dubňom	11,181
Slovan Bratislava	Bratislava	Tehelné pole	30,085
Spartak Trnava	Trnava	Štadión Antona Malatinského	18,448
ZTS Dubnica nad Váhom	Dubnica	Štadión Zimný	5,450

== League table ==
Pos	Team	Pld	W	D	L	GF	GA	GD	Pts	Qualification or relegation
1	Žilina (C)	36	17	13	6	62	35	+27	64 (Note: Žilina ahead of Dukla Banská Bystrica on head-to-head record; Žilina: 8 pts, Dukla Banská Bystrica: 2 pts.)	Qualification for Champions League second qualifying round
2	Dukla Banská Bystrica	36	17	13	6	58	36	+22	64	Qualification for UEFA Cup first qualifying round
3	Ružomberok	36	15	10	11	53	47	+6	55	
4	Spartak Trnava	36	15	8	13	46	46	0	53	Qualification for Intertoto Cup first round
5	Trenčín	36	13	9	14	37	43	−6	48	
6	ZTS Dubnica	36	12	10	14	41	42	−1	46	Qualification for Intertoto Cup first round
7	Inter Bratislava	36	12	9	15	38	44	−6	45	
8	Artmedia Petržalka	36	10	14	12	43	44	−1	44	Qualification for UEFA Cup second qualifying round (Note: Artmedia Petržalka qualify for 2004–05 UEFA Cup as winner of 2003–04 Slovak Cup.)
9	Matador Púchov	36	10	9	17	34	54	−20	39	
10	Slovan Bratislava (R)	36	6	11	19	37	58	−21	29	Relegation to 2. Liga

Source: RSSSF.org
Rules for classification: 1) points; 2) goal difference; 3) number of goals scored.
(C) Champions; (R) Relegated

== Results ==
=== First half of season ===
Home \ Away	ART	BB	DUB	INT	PÚC	RUŽ	SLO	TRE	TRN	ŽIL
Artmedia Petržalka		0–0	2–0	3–0	3–0	2–1	1–1	1–0	2–2	1–3
Dukla Banská Bystrica	5–2		2–0	0–0	3–0	4–2	1–0	5–0	3–0	0–0
ZTS Dubnica	2–1	2–0		0–0	3–1	2–3	0–0	1–3	2–1	1–1
Inter Bratislava	2–0	1–2	0–0		3–3	0–1	0–0	4–1	0–1	2–1
Matador Púchov	1–1	0–1	3–1	0–3		3–1	1–0	2–0	3–0	1–2
Ružomberok	2–1	2–0	3–3	2–0	2–1		0–0	3–1	2–2	1–4
Slovan Bratislava	1–1	0–0	2–0	1–0	0–1	2–1		1–3	0–4	2–1
Trenčín	0–0	1–1	2–0	0–1	1–0	3–1	2–1		0–1	2–0
Spartak Trnava	0–1	4–0	0–1	2–0	2–1	1–1	5–3	0–1		0–0
Žilina	2–2	4–2	0–0	2–2	1–1	0–3	3–3	3–1	3–0	

Source: RSSSF.org
Legend: Blue = home team win; Yellow = draw; Red = away team win.

=== Second half of season ===
Home \ Away	ART	BB	DUB	INT	PÚC	RUŽ	SLO	TRE	TRN	ŽIL
Artmedia Petržalka		0–0	1–1	3–0	3–0	2–3	1–1	1–1	0–2	0–3
Dukla Banská Bystrica	1–0		3–2	2–1	4–0	2–1	1–1	2–2	6–0	0–0
ZTS Dubnica	2–0	3–0		2–0	1–2	0–1	4–1	0–0	1–0	0–0
Inter Bratislava	0–0	1–2	1–0		1–0	1–1	3–1	1–0	1–0	1–1
Matador Púchov	1–1	0–0	1–1	4–2		1–0	1–1	1–0	0–1	0–4
Ružomberok	2–1	1–1	0–1	3–0	3–0		2–1	0–0	1–1	0–3
Slovan Bratislava	1–2	2–3	1–4	1–3	2–0	1–2		2–0	0–1	2–3
Trenčín	2–3	1–1	1–0	2–0	0–0	1–1	1–0		3–0	1–0
Spartak Trnava	1–0	1–1	3–0	1–3	1–1	1–0	2–2	3–1		2–1
Žilina	1–1	2–0	3–1	2–1	2–0	1–1	1–0	3–0	2–1	

Source: RSSSF.org
Legend: Blue = home team win; Yellow = draw; Red = away team win.

== Season statistics ==
=== Top scorers ===
Rank	Player	Club	Goals
1	(Slovakia) Roland Števko	Ružomberok	22
2	(Slovakia) Marek Krejčí	Artmedia Petržalka	15
2	(Slovakia) Róbert Semeník	Banská Bystrica	15
4	(Slovakia) Juraj Dovičovič	ZTS Dubnica	13
5	(Slovakia) Marek Bažík	Žilina	11
5	(Slovakia) Miroslav Kriss	Spartak Trnava	11
7	(Slovakia) Vladimír Kožuch	Spartak Trnava	10
7	(Slovakia) Michal Gottwald	Žilina	10
7	(Slovakia) Dušan Sninský	Žilina	10
7	(Slovakia) Martin Jakubko	Banská Bystrica	10
11	(Slovakia) Adam Nemec	Dubnica/Puchov	9
11	(Slovakia) Juraj Halenár	Inter	9
11	(Slovakia) Ladislav Onofrej	Slovan	9
11	(Slovakia) Marek Ujlaky	Spartak Trnava	9

== Awards ==
=== Top Eleven ===
- Goalkeeper: (Slovakia) Ján Mucha (Žilina)
- Defence: (Slovakia) Radoslav Zabavník, (Slovakia) Dušan Sninský, (Slovakia) Branislav Labant (all Žilina), (Slovakia) Marek Čech (Inter)
- Midfield: (Slovakia) Miroslav Barčík (Žilina), (Slovakia) Miroslav Sovič (B.Bystrica), (Slovakia) Juraj Dovičovič (Dubnica), (Slovakia) Ladislav Onofrej (Slovan)
- Attack: (Slovakia) Roland Števko (MFK Ružomberok), (Slovakia) Marek Krejčí (Artmedia)

== See also ==
- 2003–04 Slovak Cup
- 2003–04 2. Liga (Slovakia)
