= Vojin Prole =

Serbian footballer

Personal information
- Full name: Vojin Prole
- Date of birth: 16 April 1976 (age 50)
- Place of birth: Novi Sad, SR Serbia, SFR Yugoslavia
- Height: 1.90 m (6 ft 3 in)
- Position: Goalkeeper

Youth career
- Vojvodina

Senior career*
Years	Team	Apps	(Gls)
1996–1997	Mladost Bački Jarak	20	(0)
1997–2001	Železnik	78	(0)
2001–2007	Slovan Bratislava		

International career
2001	Serbia and Montenegro	1	(0)
- * Club domestic league appearances and goals

Vojin Prole (Serbian Cyrillic: Војин Проле; born 16 April 1976) is a Serbian former professional footballer who played as a goalkeeper.

== Club career ==
After making his senior debut with Mladost Bački Jarak, Prole spent four seasons at Železnik, amassing over 50 appearances in the First League of FR Yugoslavia between 1997 and 2001. He subsequently moved abroad to Slovakia and signed with Slovan Bratislava, spending the rest of his career with the club. He was released by Slovan in summer 2007.

== International career ==
At international level, Prole represented FR Yugoslavia at the Millennium Super Soccer Cup in India, as the team won the tournament. He made one appearance in the process, coming on as a substitute in the final against Bosnia and Herzegovina.

== Career statistics ==
Club	Season	League	
Club	Season	Apps	Goals
Mladost Bački Jarak	1996–97	20	0
Železnik	1997–98	28	0
Železnik	1998–99	14	0
Železnik	1999–2000	7	0
Železnik	2000–01	29	0
Slovan Bratislava	2001–02	25	0
Slovan Bratislava	2002–03	28	0
Slovan Bratislava	2006–07	15	0
Slovan Bratislava	Total	166	0
