= Čaňa =

Čaňa Čaňa
- Municipality
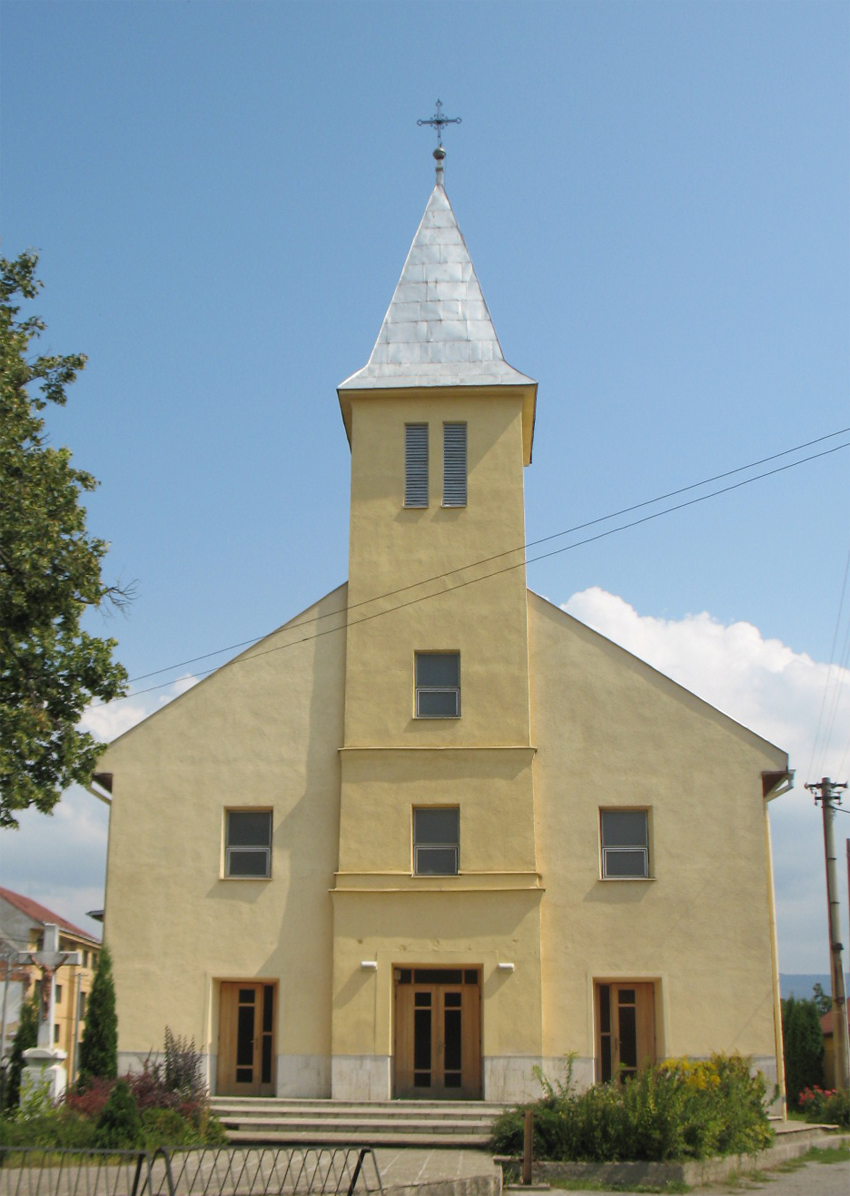
- Roman Catholic Church in Čaňa

- Flag Coat of arms

- Location of Čaňa in the Košice Region Location of Čaňa in Slovakia
- Coordinates: 48.61°N 21.32°E
- Country: Slovakia
- Region: Košice Region
- District: Košice-okolie District
- First mentioned: 1255

Government
  - Mayor: Michal Rečka

Area
  - Total: 11.55 km^{2} (4.46 sq mi)
- Elevation: 174 m (571 ft)

Population (2025)
  - Total: 6,151
- Time zone: UTC+1 (CET)
  - Summer (DST): UTC+2 (CEST)
- Postal code: 441 4
- Area code: +421 55
- Vehicle registration plate (until 2022): KS
- Website: www.obeccana.eu

Čaňa is a village and municipality in Košice-okolie District in the Košice Region of eastern Slovakia.

== History ==
In historical records the village was first mentioned in 1164.

== Geography ==
The municipality lies at an altitude of 174 metres (571 ft) and covers an area of 11.55 km^{2} (4.46 sq mi) (2025).

== Population ==
Population statistic (10 years)
Year	1995	2005	2015	2025
Count	4367	5006	5765	6151
Difference		+14.63%	+15.16%	+6.69%

Population statistic
Year	2024	2025
Count	6102	6151
Difference		+0.80%

It has a population of 6151 people (31 December 2025).

=== Ethnicity ===
Census 2021 (1+ %)
Ethnicity	Number	Fraction
Slovak	5316	90.65%
Romani	403	6.87%
Not found out	296	5.04%
Total	5864	

In year 2021 was 5864 people by ethnicity 5316 as Slovak, 403 as Romani, 296 as Not found out, 38 as Czech, 30 as Rusyn, 30 as Hungarian, 17 as Polish, 14 as Other, 6 as Russian, 5 as German, 4 as Ukrainian, 3 as Moravian, 3 as English, 2 as Chinese, 1 as Irish, 1 as Italian, 1 as Silesian, 1 as Austrian, 1 as Korean, 1 as French and 1 as Croatian.

Note on population: The difference values of population numbers in the table "Population statistic" and in the sections "Ethnicity" & "Religion" is caused by the use of various statistical methods.

=== Religion ===
Census 2021 (1+ %)
Religion	Number	Fraction
Roman Catholic Church	3428	58.46%
None	1021	17.41%
Calvinist Church	532	9.07%
Not found out	400	6.82%
Greek Catholic Church	206	3.51%
Evangelical Church	146	2.49%
Total	5864	

In year 2021 was 5864 people by religion 3428 from Roman Catholic Church, 1021 from None, 532 from Calvinist Church, 400 from Not found out, 206 from Greek Catholic Church, 146 from Evangelical Church, 30 from Eastern Orthodox Church, 24 from Christian Congregations in Slovakia, 12 from Jehovah's Witnesses, 10 from Ad hoc movements, 8 from Islam, 7 from Other and not ascertained christian church, 7 from Other, 7 from Buddhism, 7 from Apostolic Church, 6 from Seventh-day Adventist Church, 5 from Baptists Church, 2 from Paganism and natural spirituality, 2 from United Methodist Church, 1 from Old Catholic Church, 1 from Hinduism, 1 from Czechoslovak Hussite Church and 1 from Church of the Brethren.

== Government ==
The village has its own police force and fire brigade but the district and tax offices are located in Košice.

== Economy and facilities ==
The municipality has also developed medical facilities including a pharmacy and outpatient facilities for children and adolescents and a gynaecologist. The municipality also has a bank and insurance branch, and a post office.

== Culture ==
The village has a public library and a DVD rental store, and a number of food stores. Čaňa has its own cinema and the village is connected to satellite television.

== Sport ==
The village has a football pitch, four tennis courts, hockey stadium, a swimming pool and a gymnasium.

The most popular sport is football and local team FK Čaňa.

== Transport ==
The village has a railway station, however, it is not currently served by any passenger services. Čaňa also has a garage and a facility for car parts.

== Genealogical resources ==
The records for genealogical research are available at the state archive "Statny Archiv in Kosice, Slovakia"

- Roman Catholic church records (births/marriages/deaths): 1787-1896 (parish B)
- Greek Catholic church records (births/marriages/deaths): 17911896 (parish B)
- Reformated church records (births/marriages/deaths): 1800-1895 (parish A)

== See also ==
- List of municipalities and towns in Slovakia
