= 2002–03 Slovak Cup =

Tournament details
- Country: Slovakia
- Teams: 30

Final positions
- Champions: Matador Púchov
- Runners-up: Slovan Bratislava

The 2002–03 Slovak Cup was the 34th season of Slovakia's annual knock-out cup competition and the tenth since the independence of Slovakia. It began on 10 September 2002 with the matches of first round and ended on 8 May 2003 with the final. The winners of the competition earned a place in the qualifying round of the UEFA Cup. Koba Senec were the defending champions.

== First round ==
The match DAC Dunajská Streda – Matador Púchov was played on 10 September 2002 and the thirteen games were played on 11 September 2002 .

Team 1	Score	Team 2
DAC Dunajská Streda	0–2	Matador Púchov
Dukla Banská Bystrica	0–0 (2–4 p)	1. FC Košice
Stará Ľubovňa	2–1	SCP Ružomberok
Rimavská Sobota	1–1 (11–10 p)	ŠK Kremnička
Podbrezová	3–1	FK Čaňa
Steel Trans Ličartovce	1–1 (3–4 p)	Petrochema Dubová
Tatran Prešov	1–0	HFC Humenné
Ružinov Bratislava	0–1	ZTS Dubnica nad Váhom
MFK Myjava	3–0	Inter Bratislava
Veľké Leváre	1–2	Laugaricio Trenčín
ŠKP Devin	0–2	Spartak Trnava
Topvar Horná Nitra Topoľčany	3–0	Artmedia Petržalka
FC Nitra	2–0	SH Senica
Slovan Bratislava B	0–2	Slovan Bratislava

== Second round ==
The seven games were played on 23 September 2002 and the match ŽP Šport Podbrezová – MFK Myjava/Tura Luka was played on 10 October 2002.

Team 1	Score	Team 2
Koba Senec	2–1	Spartak Trnava
Tatran Prešov	2–1	Laugaricio Trenčín
ZTS Dubnica nad Váhom	0–0 (3–4 p)	MŠK Žilina
Matador Púchov	3–0	1. FC Košice
Petrochema Dubová	2–0	Rimavská Sobota
FC Nitra	6–0	Stará Ľubovňa
Topvar Horná Nitra Topoľčany	1–2	Slovan Bratislava
Podbrezová	3–1	MFK Myjava/Tura Luka

== Quarter-finals ==
The games were played on 22 October 2002.

22 October 2002	Matador Púchov	3–0	Tatran Prešov	Púchov
14:00	Vavrík 22'; Škripec 65', 67'	Report		Stadium: Mestský štadión Púchov; Attendance: 1,300; Referee: Pavol Šipoš

22 October 2002	Koba Senec	1–2	MŠK Žilina	Senec
14:00	Novotný 6'	Report	Gottwald 11'; Sninský 90+2'	Stadium: Štadión VTJ Koba Senec; Attendance: 1,300; Referee: Ľubomír Udvardy

22 October 2002	Petrochema Dubová	2–0	FC Nitra	Dubová
14:00	Stacho 54', 85'	Report		Stadium: Štadión ŠK Petrochema Dubová; Attendance: 700; Referee: Zsolt Simon

22 October 2002	Podbrezová	0–1	Slovan Bratislava	Podbrezová
14:30		Report	Pecko 90+2'	Stadium: Štadión Kolkáreň; Attendance: 860; Referee: Jozef Kačenga

== Semi-finals ==
The first legs were played on 19 March 2003. The second legs were played on 15 and 16 April 2003.

=== First legs ===
19 March 2003	Petrochema Dubová	2–2	Matador Púchov	Dubová
15:00	Kamenský 13', 60' (pen.)	Report	Škripec 3'; Mužlay 55'	Stadium: Štadión ŠK Petrochema Dubová; Attendance: 831; Referee: Jozef Ďuriš

19 March 2003	MŠK Žilina	2–0	Slovan Bratislava	Žilina
18:00	Mintál 31'; Varadín 64'	Report		Stadium: Štadión pod Dubňom; Attendance: 4,238; Referee: Ladislav Gádoši

=== Second legs ===
15 April 2003	Matador Púchov	1–1 (3a–3 agg.)	Petrochema Dubová	Púchov
16:00	Jambor 48'	Report	Penov 45'	Stadium: Mestský štadión Púchov; Attendance: 2,653; Referee: Anton Stredák

16 April 2003	Slovan Bratislava	4–1 (4–3 agg.)	MŠK Žilina	Bratislava
18:00	Vittek 1', 32'; Šlahor 88'; Dzúrik 90+'	Report	Kosmeľ 11'	Stadium: Tehelné pole Attendance: 2,000; Referee: Ladislav Gádoši

== Final ==
8 May 2003
16:00 CEST

Slovan Bratislava	1–2 (a.e.t.)	Matador Púchov
Hornyák 115'	Report	Perniš 111'; Breška 116'

Vojtech Schottert Stadium, Topoľčany
Attendance: 4,356
Referee: Ladislav Gádoši
