= Demjata =

Village and municipality in Slovakia

- Municipality
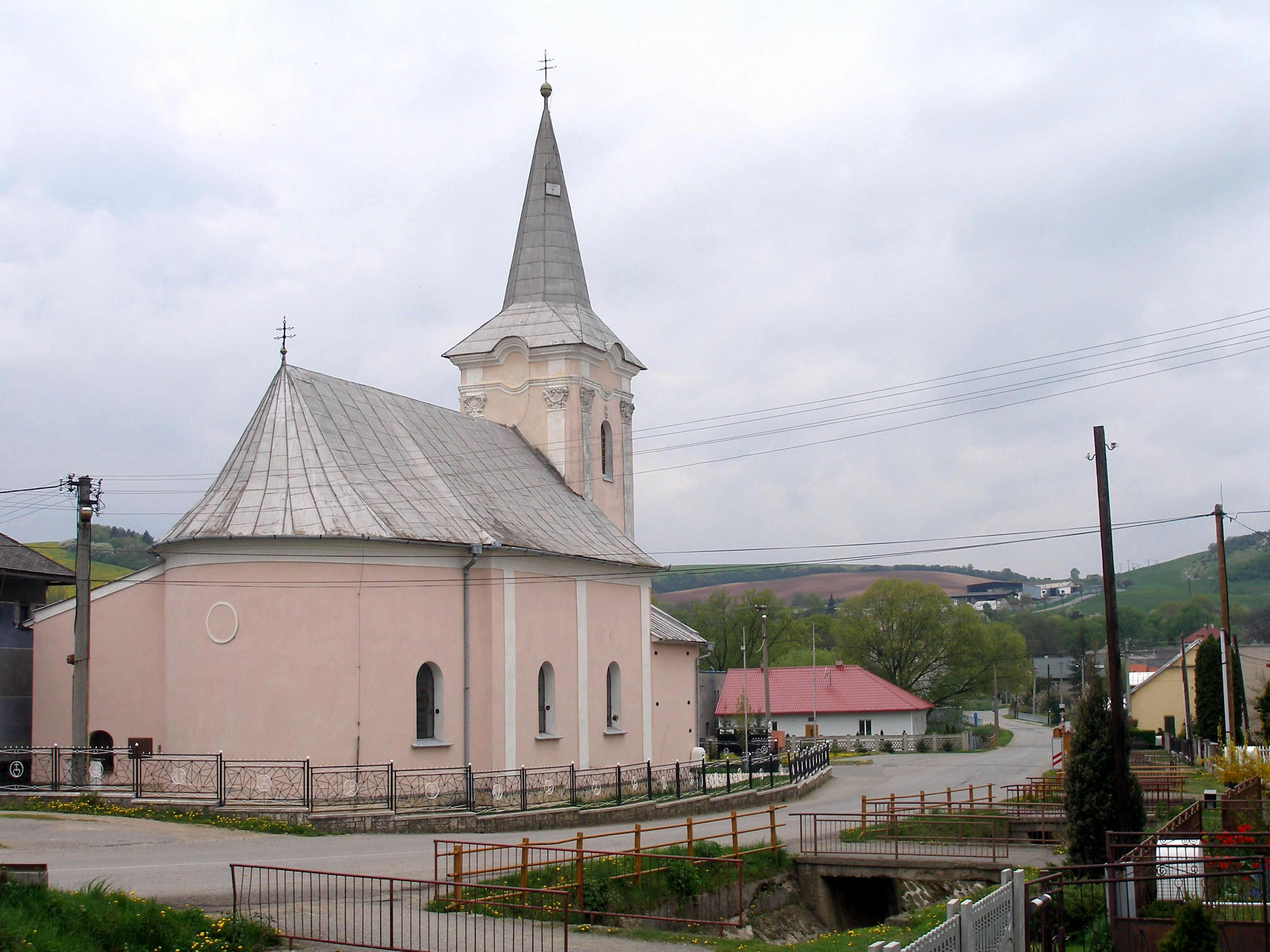

- Flag

- Location of Demjata in the Prešov Region Location of Demjata in Slovakia
- Coordinates: 49.10°N 21.32°E
- Country: Slovakia
- Region: Prešov Region
- District: Prešov District
- First mentioned: 1330

Area
  - Total: 11.49 km^{2} (4.44 sq mi)
- Elevation: 299 m (981 ft)

Population (2025)
  - Total: 1,077
- Time zone: UTC+1 (CET)
  - Summer (DST): UTC+2 (CEST)
- Postal code: 821 3
- Area code: +421 51
- Vehicle registration plate (until 2022): PO
- Website: www.obecdemjata.sk

Demjata (Hungarian: Deméte, Rusyn: Демята) is a village and municipality in Prešov District in the Prešov Region of eastern Slovakia.

== History ==
In historical records the village was first mentioned in 1330.

== Geography ==
The municipality lies at an altitude of 299 metres (981 ft) and covers an area of 11.49 km^{2} (4.44 sq mi) (2025).

== Notable people ==
- Stanislav Šesták, Slovak footballer

== Population ==
Population statistic (10 years)
Year	1995	2005	2015	2025
Count	998	1065	1069	1077
Difference		+6.71%	+0.37%	+0.74%

Population statistic
Year	2024	2025
Count	1086	1077
Difference		−0.82%

It has a population of 1077 people (31 December 2025).

=== Ethnicity ===
Census 2021 (1+ %)
Ethnicity	Number	Fraction
Slovak	1075	97.63%
Not found out	31	2.81%
Total	1101	

In year 2021 was 1101 people by ethnicity 1075 as Slovak, 31 as Not found out, 6 as Rusyn, 3 as Ukrainian, 2 as Czech, 2 as Other and 1 as Romani.

Note on population: The difference values of population numbers in the table "Population statistic" and in the sections "Ethnicity" & "Religion" is caused by the use of various statistical methods.

=== Religion ===
Census 2021 (1+ %)
Religion	Number	Fraction
Roman Catholic Church	960	87.19%
None	66	5.99%
Greek Catholic Church	37	3.36%
Not found out	23	2.09%
Total	1101	

In year 2021 was 1101 people by religion 960 from Roman Catholic Church, 66 from None, 37 from Greek Catholic Church, 23 from Not found out, 3 from Eastern Orthodox Church, 3 from Evangelical Church, 2 from Paganism and natural spirituality, 2 from Jehovah's Witnesses, 1 from Christian Congregations in Slovakia, 1 from Islam, 1 from Other, 1 from Buddhism and 1 from Ad hoc movements.

== Genealogical resources ==
The records for genealogical research are available at the state archive "Statny Archiv in Presov, Slovakia"

- Roman Catholic church records (births/marriages/deaths): 1750–1895 (parish B)
- Greek Catholic church records (births/marriages/deaths): 1800–1895 (parish B)
- Lutheran church records (births/marriages/deaths): 1724–1895 (parish B)

== See also ==
- List of municipalities and towns in Slovakia
