= Dušan Sninský =

Slovak footballer

Personal information
- Full name: Dušan Sninský
- Date of birth: 7 July 1977 (age 49)
- Place of birth: Michalovce, Czechoslovakia
- Height: 1.93 m (6 ft 4 in)
- Position: Defender

Team information
- Current team: TJ Veľké Revištia

Youth career
- Zemplín Michalovce

Senior career*
| Years | Team | Apps | (Gls) |
| 1997–2000 | Humenné | 61 | (11) |
| 2000–2001 | Drnovice | 30 | (3) |
| 2002–2004 | Žilina | 84 | (18) |
| 2005 | Dyskobolia | 25 | (1) |
| 2006 | Artmedia Bratislava | 16 | (3) |
| 2006 | Spartak Trnava | 11 | (1) |
| 2007 | Artmedia Petržalka | 1 | (0) |
| 2008 | Slavoj Trebišov | 16 | (4) |
| 2009–2010 | Zemplín Michalovce | 9 | (3) |
| 2011 | Lučenec | 11 | (3) |
| 2011– | TJ Veľké Revištia | | |

International career
| 2003–2005 | Slovakia | 6 | (0) |
- * Club domestic league appearances and goals as of 27 July 2011

Dušan Sninský (born 7 July 1977) is a Slovak footballer who played as a defender for TJ Veľké Revištia, until his retirement in 2017, due to health concerns.

== Honours ==
Žilina

- Slovak First Football League: 2001–02, 2002–03, 2003–04
- Slovak Super Cup: 2004
