= Michal Demeter =

Slovak football player

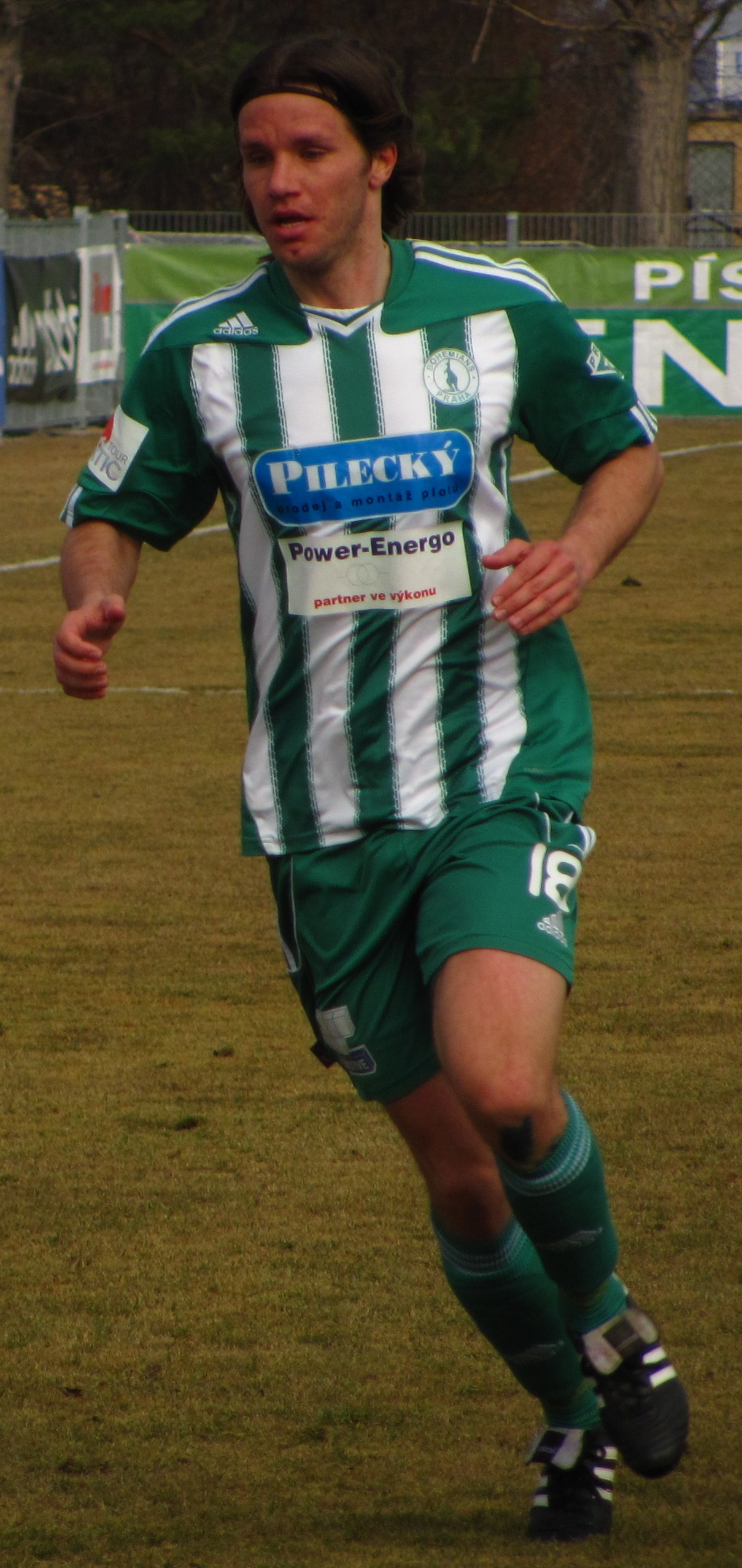

Personal information
- Date of birth: 15 May 1982 (age 44)
- Height: 1.81 m (5 ft 11 in)
- Position: Defender

Youth career
- 1989–1998: FC Artmedia Petržalka

Senior career*
Years	Team	Apps	(Gls)
?–2005	Slovan Bratislava		
2005–2007	Vysočina Jihlava	13	(2)
2007–2008	Ružomberok	15	(0)
2008–2015	Bohemians Prague	92	(2)
2015–2017	Olympia Hradec Králové		
2017	Olympia Prague	2	(0)

International career
2003	Slovakia U21	1	(0)
- * Club domestic league appearances and goals as of 30 June 2010

Michal Demeter (born 15 May 1982) is a retired Slovak football player who last played for Olympia Prague.
