= David Homoláč =

Czech footballer (born 1973)

Personal information
- Date of birth: 12 October 1973 (age 53)
- Place of birth: Czechoslovakia
- Height: 1.81 m (5 ft 11 in)
- Position: Defender

Senior career*
Years	Team	Apps	(Gls)
1996–2002	Hradec Králové	117	(7)
2002–2003	→ Slovan Bratislava (loan)	27	(2)
2003–2009	Dynamo České Budějovice	143	(7)
Total		287	(16)
- * Club domestic league appearances and goals

David Homoláč (born 12 October 1973) is a Czech former football player. He played in the top flight of his country, making more than 200 appearances in the Gambrinus liga. He also played in the Slovak Super Liga.
