= Martin Lukáč =

Slovak painter (born 1989)

- Martin Lukáč in 2022.
- Born: December 13, 1989 (age 36); Piešťany, Slovakia
- Education: Academy of Arts, Architecture and Design in Prague
- Known for: Painting
- Awards: Czech Award for Young Painting

Martin Lukáč (born December 13, 1989) is a Slovak painter based in New York City. His work and artistic process are known for spontaneous, intuitive expression, drawing on abstract expressionism. They incorporate pop culture elements and graffiti aesthetics. He is particularly known for his repetitive use of motifs, such as the Teenage Mutant Ninja Turtles, which he varies across extensive series.

== Early life and education ==
Martin Lukáč was born in 1989 in Piešťany, Slovakia. He suffered from severe asthma as a child, leading to hospitalisation at a mountain health resort away from his parents. At age five, his family moved to the Bratislava suburb of Petržalka. His early artistic interests were shaped by his hometown and 1990s pop culture, including American cartoons like Dexter's Laboratory and comic-book characters such as Batman. He graduated from the School of Applied Arts Josefa Vydru in Bratislava, the country's oldest art school, where he majored in stonemasonry and sculpting.

From 2009 to 2013, he attended the Department of Fine Arts and Intermedia at the Technical University of Košice, earning a Bachelor of Arts under the supervision of Adam Szentpétery and Ján Vasilko. From 2013 to 2016, he pursued a Master of Arts in painting at the Academy of Arts, Architecture and Design (UMPRUM) in Prague, studying with Jiří Černický and Marek Meduna. During his university studies, he completed internships at the Academy of Fine Arts in Prague, where he worked with Vladimír Skrepl and Jiří Kovanda, and at the Hochschule für Grafik und Buchkunst in Leipzig, where he studied under Astrid Klein and Ralf Hartmann.

== Career ==
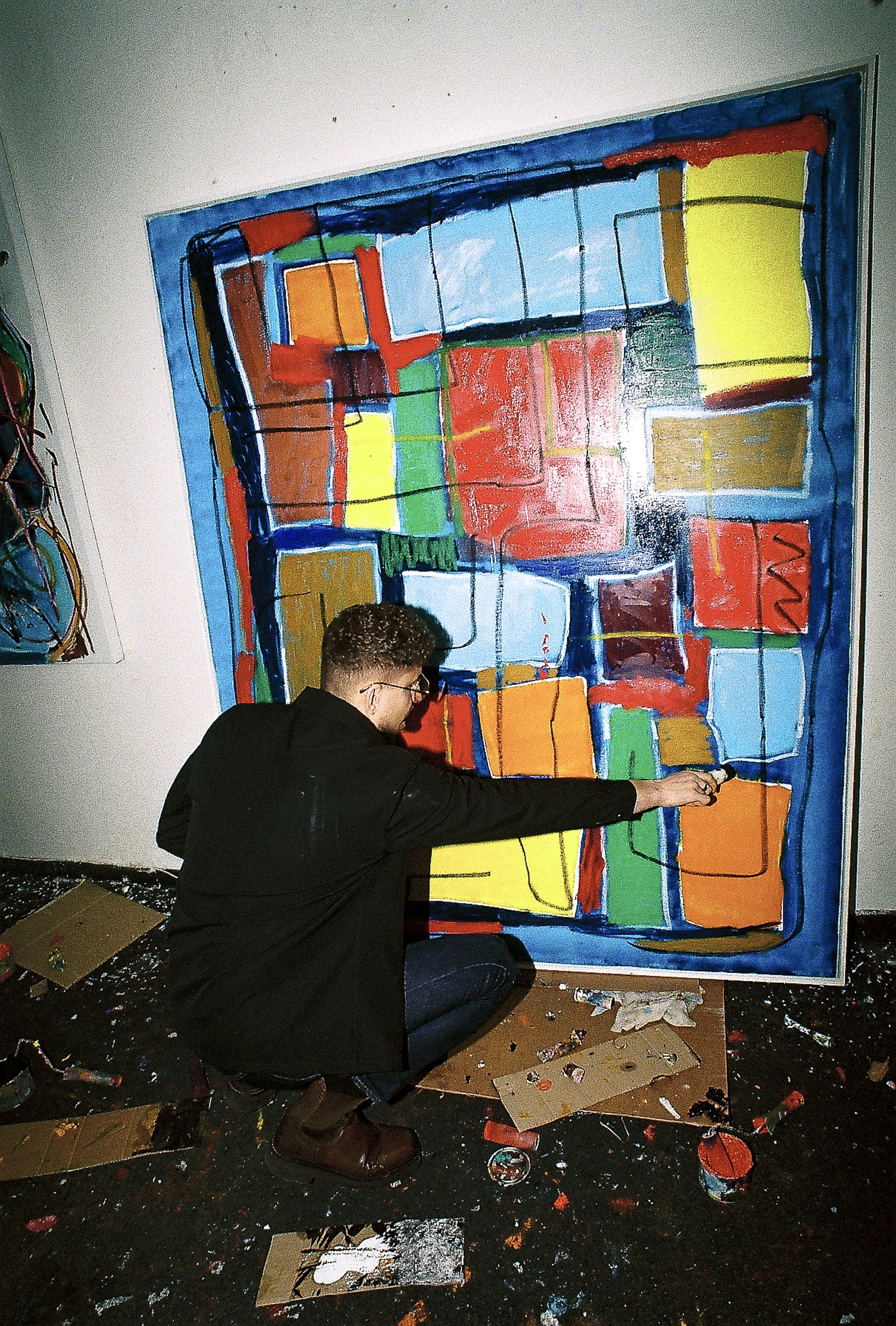
Martin Lukáč in his studio in 2022.

Lukáč's art is described as an expression of a relaxed, intuitive creative process that continues the tradition of abstract expressionism while incorporating graffiti aesthetics and pop culture elements. Brightly coloured amorphous shapes on a background of free-flowing lines and comic-like characters are frequently seen in his work, which he completes in extensive series, each containing variations on the same motif. Repetition and form reduction are the foundations of his work. According to art critics like Chris Sharp, Lukáč's painting is defined by dynamic gestural expression, which, despite its seemingly spontaneous style, is carefully premeditated, combining automatic drawing, colour layering, and techniques such as oil pastels, brushes, and rollers, thus creating tension between the expressive gesture and thoughtful premeditated composition. In a number of his works, we find the Teenage Mutant Ninja Turtles motif, which became one of his trademarks. According to Lukáč, he first began using this motif in 2015 and considers it a form of self-portrait. The motif synthesises his interests in martial arts and pop culture while engaging with the characters' namesake Renaissance masters through variations in material and form. Lukáč acknowledges that he enjoys adapting and reimagining his interests as variations on this pop culture icon, using techniques such as textile interventions and charcoal. In 2016, Martin Lukáč was featured in the "Against Nature: Young Czech Art Scene" exhibition at the National Gallery in Prague, which focused on emerging Czech artists.

Lukáč in his Prague studio in 2022.

He held a solo exhibition, "I'd rather be with you", in 2019 at Berlin's DUVE Gallery, showcasing paintings that combined pop culture motifs and abstract expressionism. In 2022, his works, exhibited for the 11th anniversary of Footshop at Galerie Mánes in Prague, explored themes of corporate identity and brand logos, as reported by Czech Vogue. In 2023, Lukáč participated in "The Cuteness Factor," an international group exhibition at the Ludwig Museum – Museum of Contemporary Art in Budapest. The exhibition explored the aesthetic of cuteness across contemporary visual culture through the work of 32 artists from 14 countries. Lukáč's paintings have also appeared at major auction houses: his work This Is a Rat Race was sold through Sotheby's Cologne as part of the Modern & Contemporary Discoveries collection in November 2024, while Yellow Turbo Boost was sold by Christie's Paris in its April 2024 Art Contemporain online auction.

== Exhibitions ==
Lukáč's notable solo, duo and group exhibitions include events held in galleries and other institutions across Europe and the United States.

=== Selected solo exhibitions ===
- 2016 – "No Love all Hate", 35M2 Gallery, Prague, Czech Republic
- 2016 – "Two Hands and a Magnifying Glass", Fait Gallery, Brno, Czech Republic
- 2017 – "MacGyver“, Photoport Gallery, Bratislava, Slovakia
- 2018 – "If on a winter's night a traveller", The Court, Pescara, Italy
- 2019 – "Aww Yeah!", Nevven Gallery Gothenburg, Gothenburg, Sweden
- 2019 – "I'd rather be with you", Duve Berlin, Berlin, Germany
- 2019 – "Mann in Flammen", Footshop Warehouse, Prague, Czech Republic
- 2019 – "Nevermind", The Cabin, Los Angeles, United States
- 2021 – "No Escape", Collectors Agenda, Vienna, Austria
- 2022 – "Martin Lukáč", Tyler Wood Gallery, New York City, United States
- 2022 – "When The Love Factors High", Dot Contemporary, Bratislava, Slovakia
- 2023 – "As Good As I Once Was", Erika Deak Gallery, Budapest, Hungary
- 2023 – "Battlefield", Galerie NOD, Prague, Czech Republic
- 2023 – "Rolling Thunder", Výstavní síň Sokolská 26, Ostrava, Czech Republic
- 2024 – "Call me country", Tönnheim Gallery, Madrid, Spain
- 2024 – “Naturale”, Sophistica Gallery, Prague, Czech Republic
- 2025 – “Broadway and 125th Street”, Erika Deák Gallery, Budapest, Hungary

=== Selected duo exhibitions ===
- 2018 – Interpreter’s Booth, with Anu Vahtra, Chimera Project Gallery, Budapest, Hungary
- 2017 – Roel van der Linden & Martin Lukáč, New York Denim 85', De Vishal, Haarlem, Netherlands
- 2017 – Interpreter’s Booth, with Anu Vahtra, Lucie Drdova Gallery, Czech Republic
- 2016 – Bon Appétit, with David Krňanský, Ivan Gallery, Bucharest, Romania

=== Selected group exhibitions ===
- 2023 – The Cuteness Factor, Ludwig Múzeum, Budapest, Hungary
- 2022/2021 – The Glass Bead Game, MAMOTH, London, United Kingdom
- 2021 – GOOGOL, Artemis Gallery, Lisbon, Portugal
- 2021 – Shattered Speech, Grove Collective, London, United Kingdom
- 2019 – NOSZTRÓMO, Ashes/Ashes, New York City, United States
- 2019 – I Ain’t Though, Kunstraum Ortloff, Leipzig, Germany
- 2019 – Les Copains D’abord!, Singular Art Gallery, Nijmegen, Netherlands
- 2019 – AMARETTO, Villa Vertua Masolo, Milan, Italy
- 2018 – Collectors Choice, Eduardo Secci Contemporary, Florence, Italy
- 2018 – Connected by the Hand, Henie Onstad Kunstsenter, Oslo, Norway
- 2018 – As If a Field Could Become Some Dream, No Place Gallery, Columbus, United States
- 2018 – Den Moderne Kunstsalon, Vestjyllands Kunstpavillon, Videbæk, Denmark
- 2017–2018 – 20 cm from the ground, L21, Palma de Mallorca, Spain
- 2017 – Paper Cuts, kurátor Kristian Day, Tripp Gallery, London, United Kingdom
- 2017 – We Are the Ones, Volume 1, Carlsberg Byens Galleri & Kunstsalon, Copenhagen, Denmark
- 2017 – Selected Works – Bech Risvig Collection, Huset for Kunst & Design, Holstebro, Denmark
- 2017 – Decisions, Decisions, California Institute of the Arts, Santa Clarita, United States
- 2017 – Jeff Koons Recommends: After Shit Falls, Kers Gallery, Amsterdam, Netherlands
- 2016 – Dog.Piss.Protection.Attachments., I: Project Space, Beijing, China

== Awards ==
- 2016 – Winner — Czech Award for Young Painting
