= Želetice (Hodonín District) =

- Municipality
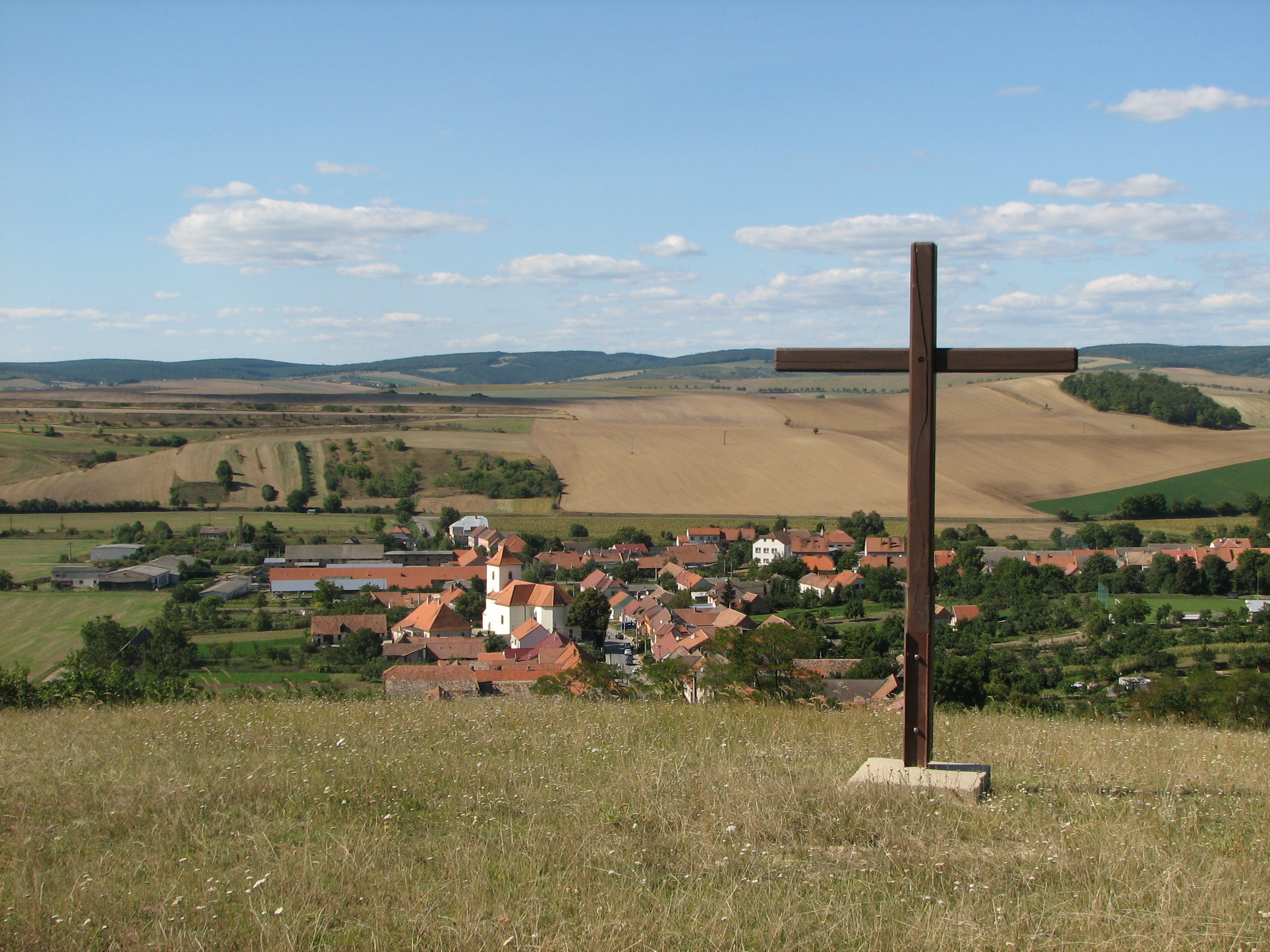
- General view

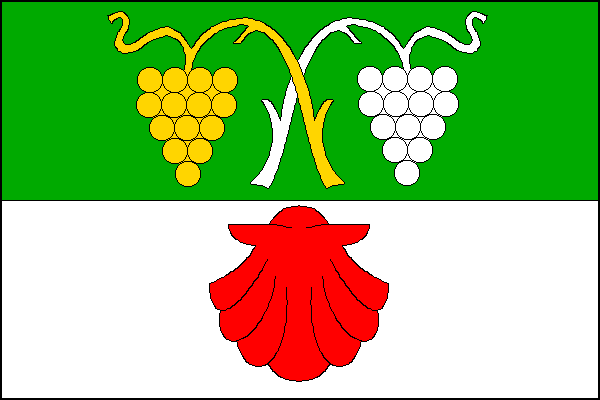
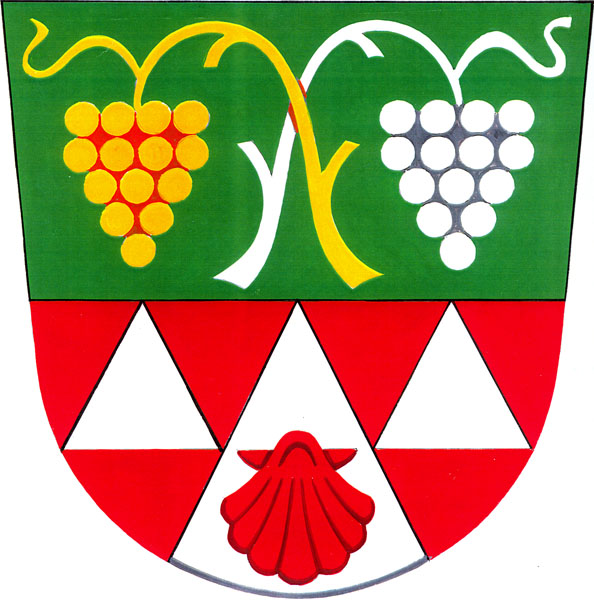
- Flag Coat of arms

- Location in the Czech Republic
- Coordinates: 49°0′51″N 17°0′29″E
- Country: Czech Republic
- Region: South Moravian
- District: Hodonín
- First mentioned: 1141

Area
  - Total: 6.11 km^{2} (2.36 sq mi)
- Elevation: 202 m (663 ft)

Population (2026-01-01)
  - Total: 512
  - Density: 83.8/km^{2} (217/sq mi)
- Time zone: UTC+1 (CET)
  - Summer (DST): UTC+2 (CEST)
- Postal code: 696 37
- Website: www.zeletice.cz

Želetice is a municipality and village in Hodonín District in the South Moravian Region of the Czech Republic. It has about 500 inhabitants.

Želetice lies approximately 21 kilometres (13 mi) north-west of Hodonín, 36 km (22 mi) south-east of Brno, and 222 km (138 mi) south-east of Prague.

== History ==
The first written mention of Želetice is in a deed of bishop Jindřich Zdík from 1141.

== Demographics ==
Historical population
| Year | Pop. | ±% |
|---|---|---|
| 1869 | 555 | — |
| 1880 | 631 | +13.7% |
| 1890 | 578 | −8.4% |
| 1900 | 636 | +10.0% |
| 1910 | 652 | +2.5% |
| 1921 | 659 | +1.1% |
| 1930 | 678 | +2.9% |
| 1950 | 569 | −16.1% |
| 1961 | 579 | +1.8% |
| 1970 | 591 | +2.1% |
| 1980 | 585 | −1.0% |
| 1991 | 539 | −7.9% |
| 2001 | 509 | −5.6% |
| 2011 | 484 | −4.9% |
| 2021 | 482 | −0.4% |
Source: Censuses

== Notable people ==
- František Komňacký (born 1951), football player and manager
