= 2002–03 Slovak Superliga =

1. Liga
- Season: 2002–03
- Dates: 12 July 2002 – 17 June 2003
- Champions: MŠK Žilina
- Relegated: 1. FC Košice
- Champions League: MŠK Žilina
- UEFA Cup: Artmedia Petržalka; Matador Púchov
- Intertoto Cup: Spartak Trnava; ZTS Dubnica
- Matches played: 180
- Goals scored: 502 (2.79 per match)
- Top goalscorer: Marek Mintál; Martin Fabuš (20 goals)
- Biggest home win: Žilina 5:0 Inter; Dubnica 5:0 Ružomberok; Slovan 7:2 Košice
- Biggest away win: Inter 0:4 Žilina; Trenčín 1:5 Žilina
- Highest scoring: Slovan 7:2 Košice
- Average attendance: ▼3,372

The 2002–03 Slovak First Football League was the tenth season of first-tier football league in Slovakia, since its establishment in 1993. It began on 12 July 2002 and ended on 17 June 2003. MŠK Žilina were the defending champions.

== Teams ==
A total of 10 teams was contested in the league, including 9 sides from the 2001–02 season and one promoted from the 2. Liga.

Relegation for 1. FC Tatran Prešov to the 2002–03 2. Liga was confirmed on 8 June 2002. The one relegated team were replaced by FC Spartak Trnava.

=== Stadiums and locations ===
Location of teams in 2002–03 1. Liga

Team	Home city	Stadium	Capacity
1. FC Košice	Košice	Lokomotíva Stadium	9,000
Artmedia Petržalka	Petržalka	Štadión Petržalka	7,500
Inter Slovnaft Bratislava	Bratislava	Štadión Pasienky	12,000
Laugaricio Trenčín	Trenčín	Štadión na Sihoti	4,500
Matador Púchov	Púchov	Mestský štadión	6,614
MFK SCP Ružomberok	Ružomberok	Štadión MFK Ružomberok	4,817
MŠK Žilina	Žilina	Štadión pod Dubňom	11,181
Slovan Bratislava	Bratislava	Tehelné pole	30,085
Spartak Trnava	Trnava	Štadión Antona Malatinského	18,448
ZTS Dubnica nad Váhom	Dubnica	Štadión Zimný	5,450

== League table ==
Pos	Team	Pld	W	D	L	GF	GA	GD	Pts	Qualification or relegation
1	Žilina (C)	36	21	7	8	69	31	+38	70	Qualification for Champions League second qualifying round
2	Artmedia Petržalka	36	20	7	9	49	32	+17	67	Qualification for UEFA Cup qualifying round
3	Slovan Bratislava	36	19	6	11	60	42	+18	63	
4	Spartak Trnava	36	15	11	10	55	47	+8	56	Qualification for Intertoto Cup first round
5	Matador Púchov	36	14	8	14	46	47	−1	50	Qualification for UEFA Cup qualifying round (Note: Matador Púchov qualify for 2003–04 UEFA Cup as winner of 2002–03 Slovak Cup.)
6	Inter Bratislava	36	12	7	17	48	58	−10	43	
7	ZTS Dubnica	36	12	7	17	41	52	−11	43	Qualification for Intertoto Cup first round
8	Ružomberok	36	12	6	18	45	60	−15	42	
9	Trenčín	36	11	5	20	48	69	−21	38	
10	1. FC Košice (R)	36	6	12	18	41	64	−23	30	Relegation to 2. Liga

Source: RSSSF.org
Rules for classification: 1) points; 2) goal difference; 3) number of goals scored.
(C) Champions; (R) Relegated

== Results ==
=== First half of season ===
Home \ Away	ART	DUB	INT	KOŠ	PÚC	RUŽ	SLO	TRE	TRN	ŽIL
Artmedia Petržalka		3–0	1–0	2–1	1–2	1–0	1–1	4–2	1–1	0–0
ZTS Dubnica	0–0		2–0	0–1	0–2	5–0	2–1	1–0	0–0	1–0
Inter Bratislava	4–1	2–0		2–1	2–0	0–2	1–3	1–0	5–1	3–2
1. FC Košice	1–1	1–1	3–3		1–1	0–1	1–0	2–3	2–2	0–2
Matador Púchov	1–2	2–0	1–1	1–0		5–1	2–1	2–1	0–0	1–0
Ružomberok	1–2	2–0	3–0	0–2	4–1		0–1	2–1	1–1	1–3
Slovan Bratislava	2–1	2–1	3–0	7–2	3–1	1–1		2–0	2–1	2–2
Trenčín	2–0	3–1	2–1	1–2	2–0	4–3	0–2		1–1	1–2
Spartak Trnava	2–2	2–0	2–1	2–0	2–1	1–0	1–2	3–0		3–1
Žilina	1–0	4–1	5–0	2–2	2–1	4–0	0–1	4–0	0–1	

Source: RSSSF.org
Legend: Blue = home team win; Yellow = draw; Red = away team win.

=== Second half of season ===
Home \ Away	ART	DUB	INT	KOŠ	PÚC	RUŽ	SLO	TRE	TRN	ŽIL
Artmedia Petržalka		2–0	2–1	1–0	1–0	3–0	2–0	1–0	2–0	2–1
ZTS Dubnica	0–1		3–0	1–0	3–1	3–3	3–2	1–2	2–1	0–0
Inter Bratislava	0–1	1–2		3–1	1–1	0–1	5–2	2–0	1–1	0–4
1. FC Košice	0–3	2–2	0–0		1–1	2–1	0–1	3–3	2–0	1–3
Matador Púchov	0–1	2–1	2–2	3–1		0–1	2–1	2–0	2–0	0–1
Ružomberok	2–1	3–0	0–2	2–2	2–1		0–0	3–0	1–3	1–2
Slovan Bratislava	1–0	0–1	1–1	2–1	2–2	3–0		1–0	2–1	1–2
Trenčín	3–1	2–2	3–1	2–2	1–2	2–1	0–2		2–2	1–5
Spartak Trnava	2–2	3–2	2–1	2–1	4–0	2–0	4–3	1–2		1–1
Žilina	1–0	2–0	0–1	3–0	1–1	2–2	1–0	4–2	2–0	

Source: RSSSF.org
Legend: Blue = home team win; Yellow = draw; Red = away team win.

== Season statistics ==
=== Top scorers ===
Rank	Player	Club	Goals
1	(Slovakia) Marek Mintál	Žilina	20
1	(Slovakia) Martin Fabuš	Trenčín(8)/Žilina(12)	20
3	(Slovakia) Róbert Vittek	Slovan Bratislava	19
4	(Slovakia) Pavol Straka	ZTS Dubnica	12
4	(Slovakia) Roland Števko	SCP Ružomberok	12
4	(Slovakia) Vladimír Kožuch	Spartak Trnava	12
7	(Slovakia) Ľuboš Perniš	Matador Púchov	10
7	(Slovakia) Juraj Halenár	Inter Bratislava	10
7	(Slovakia) Miroslav Drobňák	Inter Bratislava	10
7	(Slovakia) Ľubomír Mati	1. FC Košice	10
7	(Slovakia) Milan Ivana	Laugaricio Trenčín	10

== Awards ==
=== Top Eleven ===
- Goalkeeper: (Czech Republic) Tomáš Bernady (Púchov)
- Defence: (Slovakia) Radoslav Zabavník, (Slovakia) Branislav Labant (all Žilina), (Slovakia) Peter Dzúrik (Slovan), (Slovakia) Vladimír Kinder (Artmedia)
- Midfield: (Slovakia) Marek Mintál, (Slovakia) Zdeno Štrba, (Slovakia) Martin Ďurica (all Žilina), (Slovakia) Mário Breška (Púchov)
- Attack: (Slovakia) Róbert Vittek (Slovan), (Slovakia) Martin Fabuš (Trenčín/Žilina)

== See also ==
- 2002–03 Slovak Cup
- 2002–03 2. Liga (Slovakia)
