= Ivan Belák =

Slovak footballer

Personal information
- Date of birth: 23 January 1978 (age 48)
- Place of birth: Handlová, Czechoslovakia
- Height: 1.74 m (5 ft 9 in)
- Position: Midfielder

Team information
- Current team: FC Baník Horná Nitra
- Number: 8

Senior career*
Years	Team	Apps	(Gls)
1998–2000	FK NCHZ Nováky		
2001–2004	FK Matador Púchov	113	(14)
2005–2009	MŠK Žilina	95	(6)
2009	→FK Senica "loan"	17	(2)
2010	FK Senica	2	(0)
2011	→1. FC Tatran Prešov "loan"	4	(0)
2011–2015	FC Baník Horná Nitra	75	(35)

International career
2004	Slovakia	4	(0)

Managerial career
- 2021–2022: Žilina (assistant)
- 2022: Žilina (carateker)
- 2022-2025: Žilina U19
- 2026: MŠK Púchov
- * Club domestic league appearances and goals as of 27 July 2011

Ivan Belák (born 23 January 1978) is a Slovak professional former footballer who played as a midfielder. He previously played for 1. FC Tatran Prešov in the Slovak Corgoň Liga.

== International career ==
Belák has been capped twice for the Slovakia national football team.
