= Želetice (Znojmo District) =

- Municipality
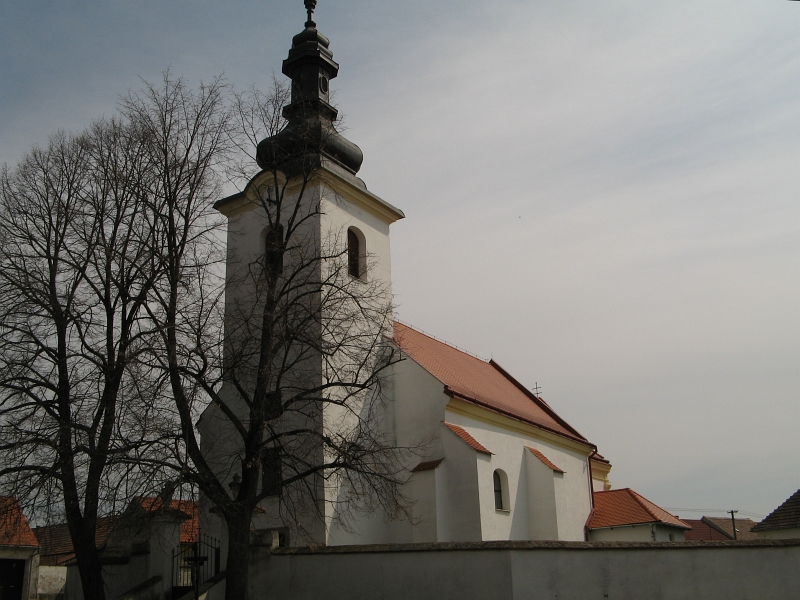
- Church of Saint James the Great

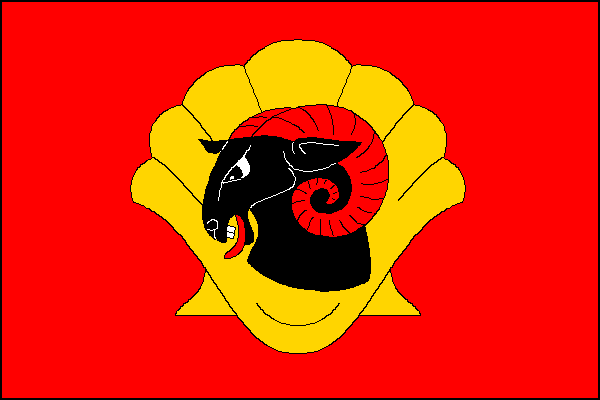
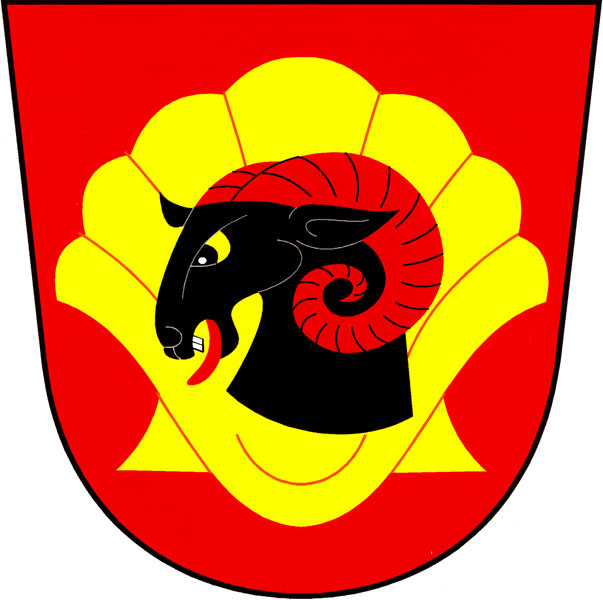
- Flag Coat of arms

- Location in the Czech Republic
- Coordinates: 48°56′11″N 16°10′58″E
- Country: Czech Republic
- Region: South Moravian
- District: Znojmo
- First mentioned: 1351

Area
  - Total: 6.01 km^{2} (2.32 sq mi)
- Elevation: 224 m (735 ft)

Population (2026-01-01)
  - Total: 305
  - Density: 50.7/km^{2} (131/sq mi)
- Time zone: UTC+1 (CET)
  - Summer (DST): UTC+2 (CEST)
- Postal code: 671 34
- Website: www.obeczeletice.cz

Želetice is a municipality and village in Znojmo District in the South Moravian Region of the Czech Republic. It has about 300 inhabitants.

Želetice lies approximately 16 kilometres (10 mi) north-east of Znojmo, 43 km (27 mi) south-west of Brno, and 182 km (113 mi) south-east of Prague.

== Demographics ==
Historical population
Year	Pop.	±%
1869	461	—
1880	577	+25.2%
1890	624	+8.1%
1900	658	+5.4%
1910	768	+16.7%
1921	640	−16.7%
1930	572	−10.6%
1950	472	−17.5%
1961	469	−0.6%
1970	420	−10.4%
1980	389	−7.4%
1991	288	−26.0%
2001	278	−3.5%
2011	274	−1.4%
2021	297	+8.4%
Source: Censuses
