= 2003–04 2. Liga (Slovakia) =

2. liga
- Season: 2003–04
- Champions: FC Rimavská Sobota
- Promoted: FC Rimavská Sobota
- Relegated: MFK Vranov nad Topľou; 1. HFC Humenné; REaMOS Kysucký Lieskovec; Slovenský hodváb Senica; 1. FC Košice
- Matches: 240
- Goals: 619 (2.58 per match)

The 2003–04 season of the Slovak Second Football League (also known as 2. liga) was the eleventh season of the league since its establishment. It began on 19 July 2003 and ended on 5 June 2004.

== League standing ==
Pos	Team	Pld	W	D	L	GF	GA	GD	Pts	Promotion or relegation
1	Rimavská Sobota (C, P)	30	16	11	3	52	21	+31	59	Promotion to Corgoň Liga
2	Steel Trans Ličartovce	30	15	7	8	51	26	+25	52	
3	Tatran Prešov	30	15	7	8	54	35	+19	52	
4	FC Nitra	30	15	3	12	45	32	+13	48	
5	Podbrezová	30	12	12	6	33	22	+11	48	
6	HFK Prievidza	30	13	9	8	42	34	+8	48	
7	Slovan Duslo Šaľa	30	12	9	9	45	29	+16	45	
8	Koba Senec	30	13	6	11	39	37	+2	45	
9	Družstevník Báč	30	13	5	12	37	38	−1	44	
10	Rapid Bratislava	30	12	6	12	43	35	+8	42	
11	DAC 1904 Dunajská Streda	30	11	6	13	36	44	−8	39	
12	Vranov nad Topľou (R)	30	10	8	12	32	43	−11	38	Relegation to 3. Liga
13	1. HFC Humenné (R)	30	9	9	12	36	50	−14	36	Relegation to 3. Liga
14	REaMOS Kysucký Lieskovec (R)	30	6	11	13	18	47	−29	29	Relegation to 3. Liga
15	SH Senica (R)	30	3	8	19	23	54	−31	17	Relegation to 3. Liga
16	1. FC Košice (R)	30	4	5	21	36	75	−39	17	Relegation to 3. Liga

Source: RSSSF.org
Rules for classification: 1) points; 2) goal difference; 3) number of goals scored.
(C) Champions; (P) Promoted; (R) Relegated

== See also ==
- 2003–04 Slovak Superliga
