= Vladimír Bednár =

Slovak footballer

Personal information
- Date of birth: 8 December 1979 (age 46)
- Place of birth: Slovakia
- Height: 1.74 m (5 ft 9 in)
- Position: Midfielder

Senior career*
Years	Team	Apps	(Gls)
1999–2001	Tatran Prešov	29	(1)
2001–2004	Slovan Bratislava	78	(1)
2004–2005	Widzew Łódź	19	(0)
2006–2008	Zagłębie Sosnowiec	59	(2)
2008–2009	Widzew Łódź	13	(0)
2009–2011	Zagłębie Sosnowiec	51	(4)
2015	Polonia Andrzejów		
2015–2016	Widzew Łódź		
- * Club domestic league appearances and goals

Vladimír Bednár (born 8 December 1979) is a Slovak former professional footballer who played as a midfielder.
