= ŠK Petrochema Dubová =

- Full name: Športový klub Petrochema Dubová
- Dissolved: 2005; 20 years ago (became FK SOKOL Nemecká)
- Ground: Stadium ŠK Petrochema Dubová, Dubová, Slovakia
- Capacity: 4,500

ŠK Petrochema Dubová was a Slovak association football club located in Dubová, formerly of the Slovak Second Football League.

== Club history ==
Dubová's best success in Slovak Football was its participation in the Slovak Cup semi-final (2002/2003) against FK Púchov.

=== Dissolving and merging ===
On May 7, 2005, Dubová was merged with FK Sokol Nemecká.

== Colors and badge ==
Its colors were yellow and blue.
