= Mestský štadión Púchov =

Sports venue in Púchov, Slovakia

Mestský štadión
- Interactive map of Mestský štadión
- Location: Športovcov 5, Púchov, Slovakia
- Coordinates: 49°07′03″N 18°19′13″E
- Owner: City of Púchov
- Capacity: 6,614
- Surface: Grass
- Field size: 105x75

Tenant
- FK Púchov

The Mestský štadión is a multi-purpose stadium in Púchov, Slovakia, currently used mostly for football matches. It is the home ground of 2. Liga club MŠK Púchov. The stadium holds a capacity of 6,080 people.

The stadium also sometimes hosts games for the Slovakia national under-15 football team and the Slovakia national under-16 football team.

== History ==
The land for the stadium's construction was acquired in 1951. Construction of the stadium began in 1953, and it opened on May 1, 1957. The arena cost 2.1 million Czechoslovak crowns to build. At that time, the facility had an athletics track and a stadium capacity of 600. Between 1958 and 1960, the main grandstand was built. In 2000, the athletics track was closed. In 2017 the stadium saw large reconstruction, a modern automatic irrigation system at the football stadium for automatic watering of the main playing field was built. In 2025, a training pitch was built by the stadium. The project costed one million euros.
