= MŠK Púchov =

Slovak football club

- Full name: Mestský Športový Klub Púchov
- Founded: 1920; 106 years ago as Športový klub Puchov
- Ground: Mestský štadión Púchov
- Capacity: 6,080
- President: TBA
- Head coach: Patrik Mynář
- League: 3. liga
- 2025–26: 15th of 16 (relegated)
- Website: futbal.mskpuchov.sk
Home colours	Away colours

MŠK Púchov is a Slovak football club that currently plays in the 2. Liga. The club is based in the town of Púchov.

== History ==
=== Early years ===
The first football club in Púchov was founded in 1920. The first football match took place in Púchov in 1921, when Púchov won against a team from Pruské 2–1. However, the most successful years did not come until after World War II. In 1950 and 1963, Púchov fought its way into the 2. Liga, later spending several years in the 3. Liga. Between the years 1974–1986, the team played under the name TJ Gumárne 1. mája Púchov in the Czechoslovak second league. After the establishment of independent Slovakia, Púchov played in the 2nd league, in the 1997/98 season it took 3rd place with a 10-point gap behind the advancing Nitra and Dubnica, and 4th place a year later. The 1999/00 season was the most successful for Púchov football in its 80-year history – the football club (under the name ŠK Matador) triumphed in the 18-member II. league with a two-point gap over NCHZ Nováky, thus becoming a participant in the highest competition for the upcoming season.

=== 2002–2003: Golden years ===
After winning the 2002–03 Slovak Cup, the only major trophy in the history of the club, Púchov managed to draw a first leg UEFA Cup game against an FC Barcelona side containing Víctor Valdés, Carles Puyol, Xavi Hernández, Luis Enrique, Ronaldinho Gaúcho, Marc Overmars and Patrick Kluivert. Milan Jambor scored the late equalizer. Mário Breška, who had scored the winning goal in the extra-time of the 2003 Slovak Cup final against SK Slovan Bratislava, provided the assist that stunned the Catalan giants. In the second leg in Camp Nou, Barcelona won 8-0.

=== 2006–2013: Financial trouble ===
In July 2006, the club lost its main sponsor, Matador a.s., and was renamed FK Púchov. The club has two stadiums, currently unusable Mestský štadión due to disagreement with the town of Púchov, and temporary Futbalový štadión Nosice. In the 2009/2010 season, Púchov found itself on the verge of bankruptcy. The club's then owner, Jaroslav Rosina, stated that the club owed 40,000 euros for the license to the football association and approximately 150,000 in addition. The club was able to survive in the lower competitions, but they would lose their best players, who mainly left for MŠK Žilina or AS Trenčín. On 24 June 2013, the official website of FK Púchov announced merging between OTJ Moravany nad Váhom and FK Púchov, as FK Púchov. The club started cooperate with the town. The town is the main sponsor of the club.

== Historical names ==
- 1920 – Športový klub Puchov
- 1945 – ŠK Rolný Púchov
- 1948 – Sokol Makyta Púchov
- 1956 – TJ Iskra Púchov
- 1968 – TJ Gumárne 1.mája Púchov
- 1993 – ŠK Matador Púchov
- 2003 – FK Matador Púchov
- 2007 – FK Púchov
- 2015 – MŠK Púchov

== Honours ==
- Slovak Cup (1961–)
  - Winners (1): 2002–03
  - Runners-up (1): 2001–02
- Slovak First Football League (1993–)
  - Runners-up (1): 2001–02
- Slovak second division (1993–)
  - Winners (1): 1999–00

== European competition history ==
Season	Competition	Round	Country	Club	Home	Away	Aggregate
2001–02	UEFA Cup	Qualifying Round	(Malta)	Sliema Wanderers	3–0	1–2	4–2
2001–02	UEFA Cup	1. Round	(Germany)	SC Freiburg	0–0	1–2	1–2
2002–03	UEFA Cup	Qualifying Round	(Kazakhstan)	FC Atyrau	2–0	0–0	2–0
2002–03	UEFA Cup	1. Round	(France)	Bordeaux	1–4	0–6	1–10
2003–04	UEFA Cup	Qualifying Round	(Georgia (country))	FC Sioni Bolnisi	3–0	3–0	6–0
2003–04	UEFA Cup	1. Round	(Spain)	FC Barcelona	1–1	0–8	1–9

== Sponsorship ==
Period	Kit manufacturer	Shirt sponsor
1998–2001	Erreà	MATADOR
2001–2004	Gems	MATADOR
2004–2006	Jako	MATADOR
2006–2022	Jako	none
2022	Jako	Mesto Púchov
2023–	Masita	Reinoo

== Current squad ==
As of 18 February 2026 Note: Flags indicate national team as defined under FIFA eligibility rules; some limited exceptions apply. Players may hold more than one non-FIFA nationality.

No.	Pos.	Nation	Player
1	GK	SVK	Andreas Barninec
2	DF	SVK	Jakub Brunner
3	DF	SVK	Patrik Leitner (on loan from MFK Ružomberok)
4	DF	SVK	Matej Moško
5	DF	SVK	Michal Mynar (on loan from Hanácká Slavia Kroměříž)
6	DF	SVK	Marián Tandara
7	DF	CIV	Marcus Traore (on loan from Žilina B)
8	MF	SVK	Ľuboslav Lévai
9	FW	SVK	Timotej Vavrík
10	FW	SVK	Adam Goljan
12	MF	SVK	Štěpán Marcaník

No.	Pos.	Nation	Player
13	MF	SVK	Adrián Kopičár
14	DF	SVK	Patrik Mráz
15	MF	SVK	Patrik Lacko
16	MF	SVK	Nicolas Martinek
17	MF	SVK	Dávid Straka (on loan from AS Trenčín)
18	DF	SVK	Matej Obšivan (on loan from AS Trenčín)
20	MF	SVK	Radim Pobořil
23	MF	SVK	Nicolas Kapus
30	GK	SVK	Juraj Vavrík
31	GK	SVK	Samuel Vavrúš
-	DF	SVK	Jakub Cmelo

For recent transfers, see List of Slovak football transfers summer 2024.

== Notable players ==
Had international caps for their respective countries. Players whose name is listed in bold represented their countries while playing for FK.

Past (and present) players who are the subjects of Wikipedia articles can be found here.

- (Slovakia) Marek Bakoš
- (Slovakia) **Ivan Belák**
- (Slovakia) **Mário Breška**
- (Czechoslovakia) Jozef Chovanec
- (Central African Republic) **Alias Lembakoali**
- (Czechoslovakia) (Slovakia) Ľubomír Luhový
- (Czechoslovakia) Milan Luhový
- (Slovakia) Krisztián Németh
- (Slovakia) Kornel Saláta
- (Slovakia) Zdeno Štrba
- (Slovakia) Ľubomír Talda
- (Benin) Salomon Wisdom

== Notable managers ==
- (Slovakia) Anton Richtárik (1993–1994)
- (Slovakia) Vladimír Hrivnák (1994–1996)
- (Slovakia) Jozef Zigo (1996)
- (Slovakia) Štefan Tománek (1996–1998)
- (Slovakia) Jozef Šuran (1998–2002)
- (Czech Republic) František Komňacký (2003)
- (Slovakia) Štefan Zaťko (2003)
- (Slovakia) Milan Lešický (2003–2004)
- (Czech Republic) Pavel Vrba (2004–2005)
- (Slovakia) Stanislav Mráz (2006–2007)
- (Slovakia) Pavol Strapáč (2007–2010)
- (Slovakia) Jaroslav Vágner (2010–2017)
- (Slovakia) Stanislav Ďuriš (2017–2018)
- (Slovakia) Eduard Pagáč (2018–2019)
- (Slovakia) Vladimír Cifranič (2019–2020)
- (Slovakia) Lukáš Kaplan (2020–2021)
- (Slovakia) Marek Šimáček (2021–2022)
- (Slovakia) Vladimír Cifranič (2022–2023)
- (Slovakia) Marián Zimen (2023-2025)
- (Slovakia) Ivan Belák (2026)
- (Slovakia) Patrik Mynář (2026-)
