= 2025–26 AS Trenčín season =

Trenčín
2025–26 season
- Manager: Ricardo Moniz
- Stadium: Štadión Sihoť
- Slovak First Football League: 8th
- Slovak Cup: Quarter-finals
- Top goalscorer: League: Cody David (9); All: Cody David (9)
- Highest home attendance: 4,489 v Spartak Trnava (3 August 2025, Slovak First Football League)
- Lowest home attendance: 686 v Zemplín Michalovce (21 February 2026, Slovak First Football League)
- Average home league attendance: 1,487
- Biggest win: 9–0 v Junior Kanianka (Away, 27 August 2025, Slovak Cup)
- Biggest defeat: 0–4 v Spartak Trnava (Away, 2 November 2025, Slovak First Football League); 0–4 v Podbrezová (Home, 7 February 2026, Slovak First Football League)
Home colours	Away colours	Third colours

The 2025–26 season was Asociácia Športov Trenčín's 15th consecutive season in the Slovak First Football League. In addition to the domestic league, Trenčín participated in the Slovak Cup.

On 17 June 2025, Trenčín appointed Ricardo Moniz as manager following the departure of Ivan Galád after the expiry of his contract.

== Squad ==
Squad at end of season

Note: Flags indicate national team as defined under FIFA eligibility rules; some limited exceptions apply. Players may hold more than one non-FIFA nationality.

No.	Pos.	Nation	Player
1	GK	SRB	Andrija Katić
5	MF	SVK	Fedor Kasana
6	MF	CRO	Antonio Baždarić
7	MF	CPV	Eynel Soares (on loan from Cherkasy)
8	MF	SVK	Tadeáš Hájovský
9	FW	NGA	Cody David
10	MF	TRI	Molik Khan
11	FW	ENG	Roshaun Mathurin
12	DF	SVK	Nikolas Brandis
14	DF	SVK	Jakub Holúbek
16	MF	NIR	Sean Goss
17	DF	EST	Kristo Hussar
18	MF	EST	Markus Poom
19	MF	GEO	Gia Nadareishvili
20	FW	NGA	Nentaka Bangs
21	FW	SVK	Lukáš Mikulaj
22	FW	EST	Dimitri Jepihhin

No.	Pos.	Nation	Player
23	DF	CRO	Viktor Šimić
25	DF	SVK	Lukáš Skovajsa
26	FW	NED	Richie Musaba
27	FW	BFA	Dylann Kam
28	MF	KAZ	Shakhmurza Adyrbekov
29	DF	TOG	Loïc Bessilé
30	GK	SVK	Matúš Sláviček
33	DF	SVK	Richard Križan
70	FW	BIH	Franko Sabljić
74	GK	SVK	Alex Húdok
80	FW	SVK	Denis Adamkovič
83	GK	BIH	Luka Damjanović
90	DF	SVK	Hugo Pavek
95	DF	SEN	Papa Diouf
99	FW	NED	Pepijn Doesburg
—	FW	IDN	Marselino Ferdinan (on loan from Oxford United)

== Transfers ==
=== Summer ===
In: Note: Flags indicate national team as defined under FIFA eligibility rules; some limited exceptions apply. Players may hold more than one non-FIFA nationality.

No.	Pos.	Nation	Player
―	DF	CRO	Viktor Šimić (from (Croatia) NK Lokomotiva Zagreb)
―	DF	SVK	Richard Križan (Free agent)
―	DF	BFA	Dylann Kam (Free agent)
―	FW	IDN	Marselino Ferdinan (on loan from (England) Oxford United)
―	MF	KAZ	Shakhmurza Adyrbekov (Free agent)

Out: Note: Flags indicate national team as defined under FIFA eligibility rules; some limited exceptions apply. Players may hold more than one non-FIFA nationality.

No.	Pos.	Nation	Player
―	FW	NGA	Chinonso Emeka (to (Czech Republic) FK Dukla Prague)
―	MF	SVK	Damián Bariš (to MFK Skalica)

=== Winter ===
In: Note: Flags indicate national team as defined under FIFA eligibility rules; some limited exceptions apply. Players may hold more than one non-FIFA nationality.

No.	Pos.	Nation	Player
—	MF	GEO	Gia Nadareishvili (from (Georgia (country)) FC Gagra)
—	FW	CPV	Eynel Soares (on loan from (Ukraine) LNZ Cherkasy)
—	MF	NED	Richie Musaba (from (Estonia) FCI Levadia Tallinn)
—	DF	EST	Kristo Hussar (from (Estonia) FC Flora)

Out: Note: Flags indicate national team as defined under FIFA eligibility rules; some limited exceptions apply. Players may hold more than one non-FIFA nationality.

No.	Pos.	Nation	Player
—	MF	NGA	Adam Yakubu (to (Ukraine) FC LNZ Cherkasy)
—	FW	NGA	Suleman Sani (to (Germany) RB Leipzig)
—	MF	SVK	Adrián Fiala (on loan to (Czech Republic) 1.FC Slovácko)

== Competitions ==
=== Overview ===
Competition	First match	Last match	Starting round	Final position	Record							
Competition	First match	Last match	Starting round	Final position	Pld	W	D	L	GF	GA	GD	Win %
Slovak First Football League	26 July 2025	16 May 2026	Matchday 1	8th	32	13	3	16	34	51	−17	40.63
Slovak Cup	27 August 2025	10 March 2026	Second round	Quarter-finals	5	4	0	1	19	5	+14	80.00
Total					37	17	3	17	53	56	−3	45.95

Source: Competitions

=== Slovak First Football League ===
==== Regular season ====
===== League table =====
Pos	Team	Pld	W	D	L	GF	GA	GD	Pts	Qualification
5	Podbrezová	22	11	3	8	46	29	+17	36	Qualification for the championship group
6	Zemplín Michalovce	22	8	5	9	32	36	−4	29	Qualification for the championship group
7	Ružomberok	22	6	7	9	24	34	−10	25	Qualification for the relegation group
8	Trenčín	22	7	3	12	18	37	−19	24 (Note: Ranked by head-to-head points: Trenčín 6, Košice 0.)	Qualification for the relegation group
9	Košice	22	7	3	12	35	42	−7	24	Qualification for the relegation group
10	Komárno	22	5	7	10	24	34	−10	22	Qualification for the relegation group
11	Tatran Prešov	22	4	9	9	22	35	−13	21	Qualification for the relegation group

Source: Niké liga (in Slovak)
Rules for classification: 1) Points; 2) Head-to-head points; 3) Head-to-head goal difference; 4) Head-to-head away goals scored; 5) Play-off.

===== Results summary =====
Overall								Home						Away					
Pld	W	D	L	GF	GA	GD	Pts	W	D	L	GF	GA	GD	W	D	L	GF	GA	GD
22	7	3	12	18	37	−19	24	2	2	7	7	18	−11	5	1	5	11	19	−8

Source: Niké liga

===== Results by round =====
Round	1	2	3	4	5	6	7	8	9	10	11	12	13	14	15	16	17	18	19	20	21	22
Ground	A	H	A	H	A	A	H	A	H	A	H	H	A	H	A	H	H	A	H	A	H	A
Result	W	L	W	W	L	W	L	L	L	L	D	L	L	W	L	L	D	D	L	W	L	W
Position	3	8	5	3	5	4	5	6	6	7	7	9	9	7	9	10	10	10	10	8	10	8
Points	3	3	6	9	9	12	12	12	12	12	13	13	13	16	16	16	17	18	18	21	21	24

Source: Worldfootball
A = Away; H = Home; W = Win; D = Draw; L = Loss

===== Matches =====
26 July 2025 1	Komárno	1–2	Trenčín	Zlaté Moravce
18:00 CEST (UTC+2)	Šimko 20'	Report	Šimko 14' (o.g.); Hájovský (yellow card) 72'; Sabljić 74'; Yakubu (yellow card) 87'	Stadium: ViOn Aréna; Attendance: 452; Referee: Matej Choreň; Assistant referees: Dušan Štofik, Mário Roszbeck

3 August 2025 2	Trenčín	0–1	Spartak Trnava	Trenčín
17:00 CEST (UTC+2)	Kranthove (yellow card) 38'; Sani (red card) 72'	Report	Daniel 45'; Moistsrapishvili (yellow card) 49'; Jureškin (yellow card) 66' (yellow-red card) 72'; Kudlička (yellow card) 88'; Koštrna (yellow card) 90' (yellow-red card)	Stadium: Štadión Sihoť; Attendance: 4,489; Referee: Peter Ziemba; Assistant referees: Tobiáš Pacák, Peter Čajka

10 August 2025 3	Košice	0–1	Trenčín	Košice
17:00 CEST (UTC+2)	Magda (yellow card) 90'	Report	Khan 50', (yellow card) 85'; Bessilé (yellow card) 88'	Stadium: Košická futbalová aréna Attendance: 3,288; Referee: Peter Kráľovič; Assistant referees: Milan Štrbo, Pavel Jánošík

17 August 2025 4	Trenčín	2–1	Žilina	Trenčín
19:00 CEST (UTC+2)	Kam (yellow card) 24'; Hájovský 39'; Khan 69'	Report	Kaprálik 26'	Stadium: Štadión Sihoť; Attendance: 2,109; Referee: Erik Gemzický; Assistant referees: Ján Pozor, Simeon Vass

23 August 2025 5	DAC Dunajská Streda	4–1	Trenčín	Dunajská Streda
20:30 CEST (UTC+2)	Tuboly (yellow card) 25'; Nemanič 38'; Đukanović 45'; Udvaros (yellow card) 60'; Redzic 74'; Gruber 84'	Report	Križan (red card) 33'; Khan (yellow card) 36'; Bessilé 54'; Sani (yellow card) 58'; Yakubu (yellow card) 87'	Stadium: MOL Aréna; Attendance: 3,993; Referee: Matej Choreň; Assistant referees: Daniel Poláček, Tomáš Vorel

30 August 2025 6	Tatran Prešov	2–3	Trenčín	Prešov
18:00 CEST (UTC+2)	Simon 24'; Gáll (yellow card) 73'; Morim 81'; Sipľak (yellow card) 90'; Menich (red card) 90'	Report	Sani 32', 78', (yellow card) 66'; Pavek 41'; Yakubu (yellow card) 61'; Khan (yellow card) 79'; Kam (yellow card) 82'; Goss (yellow card) 90'; Hájovský (yellow card) 90'	Stadium: Futbal Tatran Arena; Attendance: 6,380; Referee: Filip Glova; Assistant referees: Simeon Vass, Peter Čajka

13 September 2025 7	Trenčín	0–3	Ružomberok	Trenčín
18:00 CEST (UTC+2)	Yakubu (yellow card) 38'; Bagín (yellow card) 52'; Pavek (yellow card) 56'; Hájovský (yellow card) 64'; Khan (yellow card) 89'	Report	Köstl 58', (yellow card) 89'; Selecký (yellow card) 78'; Mojžiš (yellow card) 79'; Bagín 86' (o.g.); Král 90'; Bačík (yellow card) 90'	Stadium: Štadión Sihoť; Attendance: 1,713; Referee: Michal Očenáš; Assistant referees: Tomáš Straka, Juraj Halíček

20 September 2025 8	Podbrezová	2–0	Trenčín	Podbrezová
18:00 CEST (UTC+2)	Galčík 3'; Paraj (yellow card) 53'; Šiler 60' (pen.), (yellow card) 62'; Niňaj (yellow card) 90+2'	Report	Hájovský (yellow card) 38'; Bagín (yellow card) 90+8'	Stadium: ZELPO Aréna; Attendance: 825; Referee: Igor Valent; Assistant referees: Ákos Juhos, Matej Zemko

27 September 2025 9	Trenčín	1–2	Slovan Bratislava	Trenčín
18:00 CEST (UTC+2)	Adyrbekov (yellow card) 55'; Khan 90' (pen.); Kranthove (yellow card) 90+1'	Report	Marcelli 4', 45'; Ibrahim (yellow card) 29'; Weiss (yellow card) 33'; Lichý (yellow card) 89'	Stadium: Štadión Sihoť; Attendance: 4,318; Referee: Lukáš Dzivjak; Assistant referees: Peter Bednár, Dávid Bobko

4 October 2025 10	Zemplín Michalovce	2–0	Trenčín	Michalovce
18:00 CEST (UTC+2)	Ramos 27'; Brosnan 28'; Zubairu (yellow card) 70'; Begala (yellow card) 90'	Report	Baždarić (yellow card) 69'; Katić (yellow card) 85'	Stadium: Mestský futbalový štadión Attendance: 1,208; Referee: Boris Benedik; Assistant referees: Tomáš Vorel, Rastislav Kuba

18 October 2025 11	Trenčín	1–1	Skalica	Trenčín
15:30 CEST (UTC+2)	Skovajsa 83'	Report	Daniel (yellow card) 71'; Morong 72'; Suľa (yellow card) 90+7'; Junas (yellow card) 90+8'	Stadium: Štadión Sihoť; Attendance: 1,015; Referee: Peter Kráľovič; Assistant referees: Milan Štrbo, Mário Roszbeck

25 October 2025 12	Trenčín	0–1	Komárno	Trenčín
15:30 CEST (UTC+2)	Križan (yellow card) 3'; Baždarić (yellow card) 31'; Holúbek (yellow card) 53'; Sani (red card) 68'	Report	Tamás (yellow card) 45'; Šmehyl 62' (pen.); Špiriak (yellow card) 90'	Stadium: Štadión Sihoť; Attendance: 988; Referee: Jaroslav Sučka; Assistant referees: Dušan Štofik, Jakub Košecký

2 November 2025 13	Spartak Trnava	4–0	Trenčín	Trnava
18:00 CET (UTC+1)	Taiwo 2', 53', 66'; Kasana 14' (o.g.); Jureškin (yellow card) 26'; Karhan (yellow card) 88'; Sabo (yellow card) 90+1'	Report	Skovajsa (yellow card) 42'; Ferdinan (yellow card) 73'	Stadium: Anton Malatinský Stadium; Attendance: 3,937; Referee: Marián Ruc; Assistant referees: Tomáš Straka, Pavel Jánošík

8 November 2025 14	Trenčín	2–0	Košice	Trenčín
15:30 CET (UTC+1)	Mathurin (yellow card) 40'; Sabljić 45'; Sani 68'; Kranthove (yellow card) 82'; Hájovský (yellow card) 86'	Report	Kovács (yellow card) 31'; Metu (yellow card) 39'; Perišić (yellow card) 54'	Stadium: Štadión Sihoť; Attendance: 940; Referee: Peter Ziemba; Assistant referees: Peter Čajka, Simeon Vass

22 November 2025 15	Žilina	4–1	Trenčín	Žilina
15:30 CET (UTC+1)	Roginić 46'; Faško 59', 63', 74' (pen.); Pališčák (yellow card) 86'	Report	Skovajsa 87' (pen.)	Stadium: Štadión pod Dubňom; Attendance: 1,354; Referee: Bálint Kišš; Assistant referees: Branislav Hancko, Patrik Kmec

29 November 2025 16	Trenčín	0–3	DAC Dunajská Streda	Trenčín
18:00 CET (UTC+1)		Report	Corr 21'; Ouro 57'; Ramadan 65'	Stadium: Štadión Sihoť; Attendance: 744; Referee: Michal Smolák; Assistant referees: Milan Štrbo, Ákos Juhos

7 December 2025 17	Trenčín	0–0	Tatran Prešov	Trenčín
15:30 CET (UTC+1)	Bagín (yellow card) 84'	Report	Olejník (yellow card) 19'; Šimko (yellow card) 65'; Bondarenko (yellow card) 89'	Stadium: Štadión Sihoť; Attendance: 967; Referee: Peter Kráľovič; Assistant referees: Ján Pozor, Daniel Poláček

13 December 2025 18	Ružomberok	0–0	Trenčín	Ružomberok
15:30 CET (UTC+1)	Köstl (yellow card) 33'	Report	Yakubu (yellow card) 75'; Sabljić (yellow card) 90'	Stadium: Štadión pod Čebraťom; Attendance: 543; Referee: Bálint Kišš; Assistant referees: Tomáš Straka, Ákos Juhos

7 February 2026 19	Trenčín	0–4	Podbrezová	Trenčín
15:30 CET (UTC+1)	Brandis (yellow card) 31'; Diouf (yellow card) 43'; Musaba (yellow card) 45'; Križan (yellow card) 79'	Report	Luka (yellow card) 11'; Šiler 15', 35', 45'; Lampreht 36'	Stadium: Štadión Sihoť; Attendance: 978; Referee: Lukáš Dzivjak; Assistant referees: Pavel Jánošík, Matej Hrebeňár

14 February 2026 20	Slovan Bratislava	0–2	Trenčín	Bratislava
15:30 CET (UTC+1)		Report	Soares 5', 28'	Stadium: Tehelné pole Attendance: 4,917; Referee: Peter Kráľovič; Assistant referees: Matej Zemko, Jakub Košecký

21 February 2026 21	Trenčín	1–2	Zemplín Michalovce	Trenčín
15:30 CET (UTC+1)	Pavek (yellow card) 58'; Soares 84' (pen.); Doesburg (yellow card) 90'	Report	Begala (yellow card) 22'; Ramos (yellow card) 52'; Čurma (yellow card) 64'; Ahl 75', 85'; Dzotsenidze (yellow card) 90'; Bednár (yellow card) 90'	Stadium: Štadión Sihoť; Attendance: 686; Referee: Bálint Kišš; Assistant referees: Adam Jekkel, Simeon Vass

28 February 2026 22	Skalica	0–1	Trenčín	Skalica
15:30 CET (UTC+1)	Ujlaky (yellow card) 56' (yellow-red card) 66'	Report	Soares 11' (pen.); Adyrbekov (yellow card) 44'; Križan (yellow card) 57'; Katić (yellow card) 85'	Stadium: Mestský štadión Skalica; Attendance: 445; Referee: Michal Očenáš; Assistant referees: Tomáš Straka, Juraj Halíček

==== Relegation group ====
===== League table =====
Pos	Team	Pld	W	D	L	GF	GA	GD	Pts	Qualification or relegation	KOŠ	TRE	SKA	RUŽ	KOM	TAT
7	Košice	32	13	4	15	51	55	−4	43		—	2–0	2–0	3–1	2–1	2–1
8	Trenčín	32	13	3	16	34	51	−17	42		3–0	—	2–1	3–1	1–2	1–0
9	Skalica	32	9	8	15	34	45	−11	35		3–1	4–1	—	1–0	2–1	1–0
10	Ružomberok	32	8	11	13	34	50	−16	35		1–1	4–3	0–0	—	2–1	1–1
11	Komárno (O)	32	8	8	16	34	46	−12	32	Qualification for the relegation play-offs	1–2	0–1	0–2	3–0	—	1–0
12	Tatran Prešov (R)	32	6	12	14	29	43	−14	30	Relegation to the 2. Liga	2–1	0–1	3–0	0–0	0–0	—

Source: Niké liga (in Slovak)
Rules for classification: 1) Points; 2) Points in regular season; 3) Head-to-head points in regular season; 4) Head-to-head goal difference in regular season; 5) Head-to-head goals scored in regular season; 6) Head-to-head away goals scored in regular season (if two teams tied); 7) Goal difference; 8) Goals scored; 9) Fair play ranking; 10) Drawing of lots.
(O) Play-off winners; (R) Relegated

===== Results summary =====
Overall								Home						Away					
Pld	W	D	L	GF	GA	GD	Pts	W	D	L	GF	GA	GD	W	D	L	GF	GA	GD
10	6	0	4	16	14	+2	18	4	0	1	10	4	+6	2	0	3	6	10	−4

Source: Worldfootball

===== Results by round =====
Round	23	24	25	26	27	28	29	30	31	32
Ground	A	H	H	A	H	A	A	H	A	H
Result	L	W	W	W	W	L	W	L	L	W
Position	10	8	8	8	8	8	8	8	8	8
Points	24	27	30	33	36	36	39	39	39	42

Source: Worldfootball
A = Away; H = Home; W = Win; D = Draw; L = Loss

===== Matches =====
7 March 2026 23	Košice	2–0	Trenčín	Košice
15:30 CET (UTC+1)	Perišić 37' (pen.); Lichý (yellow card) 69'; Krivák 75'; Dąbrowski (yellow card) 87'	Report	Hájovský (yellow card) 20'; Križan (yellow card) 44'; Soares (yellow card) 88'	Stadium: Košická futbalová aréna Attendance: 2,692; Referee: Erik Gemzický; Assistant referees: Daniel Poláček, Tomáš Vorel

15 March 2026 24	Trenčín	2–1	Skalica	Trenčín
15:30 CET (UTC+1)	Soares (yellow card) 5'; Slavíček (yellow card) 5'; Mikulaj 41'; Brandis 69'; Pavek (yellow card) 85'	Report	Niňaj (yellow card) 63'; Ujlaky (yellow card) 72', (goal) 86'; Onyedika (yellow card) 90'; Leginus (yellow card) 90'	Stadium: Štadión Sihoť; Attendance: 1,012; Referee: Boris Benedik; Assistant referees: Dušan Štofik, Matej Hrebeňár

21 March 2026 25	Trenčín	3–1	Ružomberok	Trenčín
15:30 CET (UTC+1)	Hájovský 45'; David 62' (pen.), 74'	Report	Fila 22' (pen.); Grygar (yellow card) 33'; Luterán (yellow card) 36'; Tučný (yellow card) 50'	Stadium: Štadión Sihoť; Attendance: 861; Referee: Matej Choreň; Assistant referees: Mário Roszbeck, Dávid Bobko

5 April 2026 26	Komárno	0–1	Trenčín	Zlaté Moravce
15:30 CEST (UTC+2)	Špiriak (yellow card) 78'	Report	Mathurin (yellow card) 35'; Soares (yellow card) 43'; Mikulaj 47'; Križan (yellow card) 90'; Diouf (yellow card) 90+2'	Stadium: ViOn Aréna; Attendance: 356; Referee: Michal Očenáš; Assistant referees: Adam Jekkel, Tobiáš Pacák

11 April 2026 27	Trenčín	1–0	Tatran Prešov	Trenčín
15:30 CEST (UTC+2)	David 61'; Soares (yellow card) 90'	Report	Menich (yellow card) 89'	Stadium: Štadión Sihoť; Attendance: 1,095; Referee: Filip Glova; Assistant referees: Peter Bednár, Matej Hrebeňár

19 April 2026 28	Skalica	4–1	Trenčín	Skalica
15:30 CEST (UTC+2)	Bariš 19', (yellow card) 71'; Pudhorocký 26', 74'; Daniel 50'; Ujlaky (yellow card) 68'; Morong (yellow card) 90'	Report	David 30'; Poom (yellow card) 34'; Goss (yellow card) 45'	Stadium: Mestský štadión Skalica; Attendance: 439; Referee: Michal Smolák; Assistant referees: Ján Pozor, Ákos Juhos

26 April 2026 29	Tatran Prešov	0–1	Trenčín	Prešov
17:00 CEST (UTC+2)	Souček (yellow card) 61'	Report	David 41'; Goss (red card) 61'	Stadium: Futbal Tatran Arena; Attendance: 3,466; Referee: Peter Kráľovič; Assistant referees: Dušan Štofik, Matej Zemko

3 May 2026 30	Trenčín	1–2	Komárno	Trenčín
17:00 CEST (UTC+2)	Doesburg 90'	Report	Šimko (yellow card) 2'; Kiss 60'; Ganbayar 90+2'; Mustafić (yellow card) 90+3'; Dlubáč (yellow card) 90+4'	Stadium: Štadión Sihoť; Attendance: 909; Referee: Marián Ruc; Assistant referees: Ákos Juhos, Tomáš Vorel

9 May 2026 31	Ružomberok	4–3	Trenčín	Ružomberok
18:00 CEST (UTC+2)	Hladík 14'; Jevoš 34'; Murgaš 45' (pen.); Tučný 90+4'	Report	David 5', 24', 37' (pen.); Diouf (yellow card) 28'; Baždarić (yellow card) 85'	Stadium: Štadión pod Čebraťom; Attendance: 1,448; Referee: Lukáš Dzivjak; Assistant referees: Branislav Hancko, Tomáš Straka

16 May 2026 32	Trenčín	3–0	Košice	Trenčín
17:00 CEST (UTC+2)	David 31'; Skovajsa 37'; Poom (yellow card) 53'; Soares 74'	Report		Stadium: Štadión Sihoť; Attendance: 961; Referee: Maroš Libiak; Assistant referees: Rastislav Kuba, Simeon Vass

=== Slovak Cup ===
27 August 2025 Second round	Junior Kanianka	0–9	Trenčín	Kanianka
17:00 CEST (UTC+2)	Oller (yellow card) 47'	Report	Khan 32', 43', 44'; Sabljić 55'; Baždarić 61'; Križan 67'; Kam 78'; Pavek 85'; Dmitrović 87'	Attendance: 1,188; Referee: Peter Kráľovič; Assistant referees: Milan Štrbo, Róbert Šandrik

24 September 2025 Third round	Dubnica nad Váhom	1–2	Trenčín	Dubnica nad Váhom
15:35 CEST (UTC+2)	Púček 55'	Report	Guibero 1'; Hájovský 47'; Adyrbekov (yellow card) 48'	Stadium: Mestský športový areál Attendance: 844; Referee: Peter Kráľovič; Assistant referees: Milan Štrbo, Martin Krivošík

22 October 2025 Fourth round	Malženice	1–3	Trenčín	Malženice
14:30 CEST (UTC+2)	Sekera (yellow card) 43'; Druga 62'	Report	Sabljić 7'; Križan (yellow card) 57'; Kasana 84'; Adamkovič 85'	Attendance: 250; Referee: Matej Choreň; Assistant referees: Marek Uram, Lukáš Lauer

19 November 2025 Round of 16	Fiľakovo	0–5	Trenčín	Fiľakovo
13:00 CET (UTC+1)	Suja (yellow card) 85'	Report	Sabljić 30'; Mathurin 59'; Kasana 79'; Doesburg 85', 89'	Stadium: Štadión FTC Fiľakovo; Attendance: 810; Referee: Filip Glova; Assistant referees: Daniel Poláček, Adam Jekkel; Fourth official: Maroš Libiak

10 March 2026 Quarter-finals	Žilina	3–0	Trenčín	Žilina
18:00 CET (UTC+1)	Roginić 20'; Faško 27'; Hranica 29'	Report		Stadium: Štadión pod Dubňom; Attendance: 1,334; Referee: Peter Kráľovič; Assistant referees: Milan Štrbo, Peter Bednár; Fourth official: Igor Valent
