= List of Slovak football transfers winter 2025–26 =

Notable Slovak football transfers in the winter transfer window 2025–26 by club. Only transfers of the Niké Liga and 2. liga are included.

== Niké Liga ==
=== ŠK Slovan Bratislava ===
In: Note: Flags indicate national team as defined under FIFA eligibility rules; some limited exceptions apply. Players may hold more than one non-FIFA nationality.

No.	Pos.	Nation	Player
—	DF	SRB	Svetozar Marković (from (Czech Republic) FC Viktoria Plzeň)
TBA	FW	SVK	Adam Griger (on loan from (Czech Republic) FC Hradec Králové)
10	MF	CRO	Niko Janković (on loan from (Croatia) HNK Rijeka)
41	MF	JPN	Daiki Matsuoka (on loan from (Japan) Avispa Fukuoka)

Out: Note: Flags indicate national team as defined under FIFA eligibility rules; some limited exceptions apply. Players may hold more than one non-FIFA nationality.

No.	Pos.	Nation	Player
—	FW	GHA	Kelvin Ofori (on loan to (Slovenia) NK Olimpija Ljubljana)
—	MF	SVK	Filip Lichý (on loan to FC Košice)
—	MF	CRO	Marko Tolić (to (China) Zhejiang)
17	DF	CZE	Jurij Medveděv (on loan to Prešov)
20	MF	BIH	Alen Mustafić (on loan to KFC Komárno)
88	MF	GRE	Kyriakos Savvidis (to (Poland) Wisła Płock)

=== FC DAC 1904 Dunajská Streda ===
In: Note: Flags indicate national team as defined under FIFA eligibility rules; some limited exceptions apply. Players may hold more than one non-FIFA nationality.

No.	Pos.	Nation	Player
—	DF	SVK	Matúš Kmeť (on loan from (United States) Minnesota United FC)
—	FW	SVN	Niko Kukovec (from (Slovenia) NK Radomlje)
—	GK	SVN	Aljaž Ivačič (from Free Agent)

Out: Note: Flags indicate national team as defined under FIFA eligibility rules; some limited exceptions apply. Players may hold more than one non-FIFA nationality.

No.	Pos.	Nation	Player
—	DF	COL	Pablo Ortiz (to (Czech Republic) FC Baník Ostrava)
—	FW	HUN	Damir Redzic (to (Austria) RB Salzburg)
—	DF	FRA	Romaric Yapi (to (Finland) FC Lahti)

=== FC Spartak Trnava ===
In: Note: Flags indicate national team as defined under FIFA eligibility rules; some limited exceptions apply. Players may hold more than one non-FIFA nationality.

No.	Pos.	Nation	Player
—	MF	CRO	Marin Laušić (from (Latvia) FK Liepāja)

Out: Note: Flags indicate national team as defined under FIFA eligibility rules; some limited exceptions apply. Players may hold more than one non-FIFA nationality.

No.	Pos.	Nation	Player
—	DF	UKR	Denys Taraduda (on loan to 1. FC Tatran Prešov)
88	MF	BFA	Cedric Badolo (to (Azerbaijan) Sumgayit FK)
—	DF	SVK	Marek Ujlaky (on loan to MFK Skalica)

=== MŠK Žilina ===
In: Note: Flags indicate national team as defined under FIFA eligibility rules; some limited exceptions apply. Players may hold more than one non-FIFA nationality.

No.	Pos.	Nation	Player
—	GK	CZE	Dominik Sváček (on loan from (Czech Republic) FC Zbrojovka Brno)
77	FW	ARG	Nehuén Mendoza (on loan from (Argentina) Instituto Atlético Central Córdoba)
90	FW	ESP	Daniel Homet (from (Spain) Reus FC Reddis)

Out: Note: Flags indicate national team as defined under FIFA eligibility rules; some limited exceptions apply. Players may hold more than one non-FIFA nationality.

No.	Pos.	Nation	Player
—	GK	SVK	Ľubomír Belko (to (Norway) Viking FK)
—	DF	SVK	Samuel Kopásek (to (Czech Republic) FK Pardubice)

=== MFK Ružomberok ===
In: Note: Flags indicate national team as defined under FIFA eligibility rules; some limited exceptions apply. Players may hold more than one non-FIFA nationality.

No.	Pos.	Nation	Player
—	GK	SVK	Attila Horváth (footballer, born 2003) (from (Slovakia) FC ŠTK 1914 Šamorín)
—	MF	SVK	Ján Murgaš (on loan from (Austria) Admira Wacker)
—	DF	SVK	Marek Giuliano Antonio (loan return from (Slovakia) MFK Tatran Liptovský Mikuláš)

Out: Note: Flags indicate national team as defined under FIFA eligibility rules; some limited exceptions apply. Players may hold more than one non-FIFA nationality.

No.	Pos.	Nation	Player
—	GK	SVK	Dominik Ťapaj (to (Czech Republic) FC Viktoria Plzeň)
—	MF	SVK	Kristóf Domonkos (to (Slovakia) KFC Komárno)

=== FK Železiarne Podbrezová ===
In: Note: Flags indicate national team as defined under FIFA eligibility rules; some limited exceptions apply. Players may hold more than one non-FIFA nationality.

No.	Pos.	Nation	Player
—	FW	GEO	Luka Silagadze (from (Georgia (country)) FC Iberia 1999)
—	FW	MNE	Balša Mrvaljević (from (Montenegro) OFK Mladost Donja Gorica)
—	DF	SVN	Rene Lampreht (from (Slovenia) NK Domžale)

Out: Note: Flags indicate national team as defined under FIFA eligibility rules; some limited exceptions apply. Players may hold more than one non-FIFA nationality.

No.	Pos.	Nation	Player
—	DF	SVK	Branislav Niňaj (on loan to MFK Skalica)
—	DF	CTA	Séverin Tatolna (on loan to 1. FC Tatran Prešov)
—	DF	HUN	Alex Marković (to (Czech Republic) FC Zbrojovka Brno)

=== FC Tatran Prešov ===
In: Note: Flags indicate national team as defined under FIFA eligibility rules; some limited exceptions apply. Players may hold more than one non-FIFA nationality.

No.	Pos.	Nation	Player
—	DF	CTA	Séverin Tatolna (on loan from FK Železiarne Podbrezová)
—	DF	UKR	Denys Taraduda (on loan from FC Spartak Trnava)
—	FW	ENG	Shayon Harrison (from Free Agent)
TBA	MF	SVK	Ján Bernát (from Free Agent)
17	DF	CZE	Jurij Medveděv (on loan from Slovan Bratislava)
TBA	FW	BRA	Gabriel Barbosa (on loan from (Poland) Górnik Zabrze)

Out: Note: Flags indicate national team as defined under FIFA eligibility rules; some limited exceptions apply. Players may hold more than one non-FIFA nationality.

No.	Pos.	Nation	Player
23	FW	KOS	Bleron Krasniqi (to (Austria) Kapfenberger SV)

=== AS Trenčín ===
In: Note: Flags indicate national team as defined under FIFA eligibility rules; some limited exceptions apply. Players may hold more than one non-FIFA nationality.

No.	Pos.	Nation	Player
—	MF	GEO	Gia Nadareishvili (from (Georgia (country)) FC Gagra)
—	FW	CPV	Eynel Soares (on loan from (Ukraine) LNZ Cherkasy)
—	MF	NED	Richie Musaba (from (Estonia) FCI Levadia Tallinn)
—	DF	EST	Kristo Hussar (from (Estonia) FC Flora)

Out: Note: Flags indicate national team as defined under FIFA eligibility rules; some limited exceptions apply. Players may hold more than one non-FIFA nationality.

No.	Pos.	Nation	Player
—	MF	NGA	Adam Yakubu (to (Ukraine) FC LNZ Cherkasy)
—	FW	NGA	Suleman Sani (to (Germany) RB Leipzig)
—	MF	SVK	Adrián Fiala (on loan to (Czech Republic) 1.FC Slovácko)

=== MFK Skalica ===
In: Note: Flags indicate national team as defined under FIFA eligibility rules; some limited exceptions apply. Players may hold more than one non-FIFA nationality.

No.	Pos.	Nation	Player
—	DF	SVK	Branislav Niňaj (on loan from FK Železiarne Podbrezová)
—	DF	SVK	Lukáš Fabiš (from MFK Košice)
—	FW	NGA	Abbati Abdullahi (on loan from (Poland) Górnik Zabrze)
—	FW	NGA	Philip Onyedika (from (Czech Republic) FK Viktoria Žižkov)
—	DF	SVK	Marek Ujlaky (on loan from Spartak Trnava)

Out: Note: Flags indicate national team as defined under FIFA eligibility rules; some limited exceptions apply. Players may hold more than one non-FIFA nationality.

No.	Pos.	Nation	Player
—	FW	SVK	Marek Fábry (to Dynamo Malženice)
—	FW	GER	Sean Seitz (to (Germany) SV Eintracht Trier 05)
—	FW	SVK	Marek Švec (to (Austria) FC Hertha Wels)

=== MFK Zemplín Michalovce ===
In: Note: Flags indicate national team as defined under FIFA eligibility rules; some limited exceptions apply. Players may hold more than one non-FIFA nationality.

No.	Pos.	Nation	Player
—	FW	POL	Tomasz Walczak (from (Poland) Raków Częstochowa)

Out: Note: Flags indicate national team as defined under FIFA eligibility rules; some limited exceptions apply. Players may hold more than one non-FIFA nationality.

No.	Pos.	Nation	Player
—	FW	LTU	Gytis Paulauskas (to (South Korea) Jeju SK FC)

=== FC Košice ===
In: Note: Flags indicate national team as defined under FIFA eligibility rules; some limited exceptions apply. Players may hold more than one non-FIFA nationality.

No.	Pos.	Nation	Player
—	DF	AUT	Leonardo Lukačević (from (Austria) SC Rheindorf Altach)
—	MF	CRO	Edin Julardžija (from (Bosnia and Herzegovina) FK Sarajevo)
—	DF	SVK	Sebastian Kóša (on loan from (Spain) Real Zaragoza)
—	MF	SVK	Filip Lichý (on loan from ŠK Slovan Bratislava)

Out: Note: Flags indicate national team as defined under FIFA eligibility rules; some limited exceptions apply. Players may hold more than one non-FIFA nationality.

No.	Pos.	Nation	Player
—	FW	SVK	Adam Goljan (to MŠK Púchov)
—	DF	SVK	Lukáš Fabiš (to MFK Skalica)
—	FW	USA	Zyen Jones (to KFC Komárno)
—	DF	AUT	Mario Pejazic (to (Germany) Borussia Dortmund B)

=== KFC Komárno ===
In: Note: Flags indicate national team as defined under FIFA eligibility rules; some limited exceptions apply. Players may hold more than one non-FIFA nationality.

No.	Pos.	Nation	Player
—	MF	SVK	Kristóf Domonkos (from MFK Ružomberok)
—	FW	SVK	Boris Druga (on loan from OFK Dynamo Malženice)
—	FW	USA	Zyen Jones (from FC Košice)
20	MF	BIH	Alen Mustafić (on loan from Slovan Bratislava)

Out: Note: Flags indicate national team as defined under FIFA eligibility rules; some limited exceptions apply. Players may hold more than one non-FIFA nationality.

No.	Pos.	Nation	Player

== 2. liga ==
=== FC ViOn Zlaté Moravce ===
In: Note: Flags indicate national team as defined under FIFA eligibility rules; some limited exceptions apply. Players may hold more than one non-FIFA nationality.

No.	Pos.	Nation	Player
—	DF	CZE	Vojtěch Kubista (from (Poland) Sandecja Nowy Sącz)

Out: Note: Flags indicate national team as defined under FIFA eligibility rules; some limited exceptions apply. Players may hold more than one non-FIFA nationality.

No.	Pos.	Nation	Player

=== FC Petržalka ===
In: Note: Flags indicate national team as defined under FIFA eligibility rules; some limited exceptions apply. Players may hold more than one non-FIFA nationality.

No.	Pos.	Nation	Player

Out: Note: Flags indicate national team as defined under FIFA eligibility rules; some limited exceptions apply. Players may hold more than one non-FIFA nationality.

No.	Pos.	Nation	Player

=== MFK Dukla Banská Bystrica ===
In: Note: Flags indicate national team as defined under FIFA eligibility rules; some limited exceptions apply. Players may hold more than one non-FIFA nationality.

No.	Pos.	Nation	Player
—	DF	CRO	Ogi Jankelić (from (Slovakia) FC Lokomotíva Košice)

Out: Note: Flags indicate national team as defined under FIFA eligibility rules; some limited exceptions apply. Players may hold more than one non-FIFA nationality.

No.	Pos.	Nation	Player
—	MF	SVK	Šimon Vlna (to (Czech Republic) FC Baník Ostrava B)
—	DF	SVK	Oliver Klimpl (to (Czech Republic) FK Teplice)

=== MŠK Považská Bystrica ===
In: Note: Flags indicate national team as defined under FIFA eligibility rules; some limited exceptions apply. Players may hold more than one non-FIFA nationality.

No.	Pos.	Nation	Player

Out: Note: Flags indicate national team as defined under FIFA eligibility rules; some limited exceptions apply. Players may hold more than one non-FIFA nationality.

No.	Pos.	Nation	Player

=== MFK Tatran Liptovský Mikuláš ===
In: Note: Flags indicate national team as defined under FIFA eligibility rules; some limited exceptions apply. Players may hold more than one non-FIFA nationality.

No.	Pos.	Nation	Player

Out: Note: Flags indicate national team as defined under FIFA eligibility rules; some limited exceptions apply. Players may hold more than one non-FIFA nationality.

No.	Pos.	Nation	Player

=== MŠK Žilina B ===
In: Note: Flags indicate national team as defined under FIFA eligibility rules; some limited exceptions apply. Players may hold more than one non-FIFA nationality.

No.	Pos.	Nation	Player

Out: Note: Flags indicate national team as defined under FIFA eligibility rules; some limited exceptions apply. Players may hold more than one non-FIFA nationality.

No.	Pos.	Nation	Player

=== FK Pohronie ===
In: Note: Flags indicate national team as defined under FIFA eligibility rules; some limited exceptions apply. Players may hold more than one non-FIFA nationality.

No.	Pos.	Nation	Player
—	MF	GAM	Mohammed Sallah (from (Slovakia) FK Železiarne Podbrezová)

Out: Note: Flags indicate national team as defined under FIFA eligibility rules; some limited exceptions apply. Players may hold more than one non-FIFA nationality.

No.	Pos.	Nation	Player
—	MF	GAM	Muhammed Hydaram (on loan to (Estonia) FS Jeglava)

=== FC ŠTK 1914 Šamorín ===
In: Note: Flags indicate national team as defined under FIFA eligibility rules; some limited exceptions apply. Players may hold more than one non-FIFA nationality.

No.	Pos.	Nation	Player

Out: Note: Flags indicate national team as defined under FIFA eligibility rules; some limited exceptions apply. Players may hold more than one non-FIFA nationality.

No.	Pos.	Nation	Player

=== ŠK Slovan Bratislava B ===
In: Note: Flags indicate national team as defined under FIFA eligibility rules; some limited exceptions apply. Players may hold more than one non-FIFA nationality.

No.	Pos.	Nation	Player

Out: Note: Flags indicate national team as defined under FIFA eligibility rules; some limited exceptions apply. Players may hold more than one non-FIFA nationality.

No.	Pos.	Nation	Player

=== MŠK Púchov ===
In: Note: Flags indicate national team as defined under FIFA eligibility rules; some limited exceptions apply. Players may hold more than one non-FIFA nationality.

No.	Pos.	Nation	Player

Out: Note: Flags indicate national team as defined under FIFA eligibility rules; some limited exceptions apply. Players may hold more than one non-FIFA nationality.

No.	Pos.	Nation	Player
—	MF	SVK	Adrian Mojžiš (to (Slovakia) Dynamo Malženice)

=== OFK Dynamo Malženice ===
In: Note: Flags indicate national team as defined under FIFA eligibility rules; some limited exceptions apply. Players may hold more than one non-FIFA nationality.

No.	Pos.	Nation	Player
—	MF	SVK	Adrian Mojžiš (from (Slovakia) MŠK Púchov)
—	FW	BRA	Arthur Legnani (from (Slovakia) Inter Bratislava)
—	FW	SVK	Marek Fábry (from (Slovakia) MFK Skalica)
—	DF	ARG	Nicolás Gorosito (from (Czech Republic) Dynamo České Budějovice)
—	MF	SVK	Kristian Pavol Stručka (from (Slovakia) MŠK Žilina U19)

Out: Note: Flags indicate national team as defined under FIFA eligibility rules; some limited exceptions apply. Players may hold more than one non-FIFA nationality.

No.	Pos.	Nation	Player
—	FW	SVK	Boris Druga (on loan to (Slovakia) KFC Komárno)

=== MFK Zvolen ===
In: Note: Flags indicate national team as defined under FIFA eligibility rules; some limited exceptions apply. Players may hold more than one non-FIFA nationality.

No.	Pos.	Nation	Player

Out: Note: Flags indicate national team as defined under FIFA eligibility rules; some limited exceptions apply. Players may hold more than one non-FIFA nationality.

No.	Pos.	Nation	Player

=== Redfox FC Stará Ľubovňa ===
In: Note: Flags indicate national team as defined under FIFA eligibility rules; some limited exceptions apply. Players may hold more than one non-FIFA nationality.

No.	Pos.	Nation	Player

Out: Note: Flags indicate national team as defined under FIFA eligibility rules; some limited exceptions apply. Players may hold more than one non-FIFA nationality.

No.	Pos.	Nation	Player

=== Slávia TU Košice ===
In: Note: Flags indicate national team as defined under FIFA eligibility rules; some limited exceptions apply. Players may hold more than one non-FIFA nationality.

No.	Pos.	Nation	Player

Out: Note: Flags indicate national team as defined under FIFA eligibility rules; some limited exceptions apply. Players may hold more than one non-FIFA nationality.

No.	Pos.	Nation	Player

=== Baník Lehota pod Vtáčnikom ===
In: Note: Flags indicate national team as defined under FIFA eligibility rules; some limited exceptions apply. Players may hold more than one non-FIFA nationality.

No.	Pos.	Nation	Player

Out: Note: Flags indicate national team as defined under FIFA eligibility rules; some limited exceptions apply. Players may hold more than one non-FIFA nationality.

No.	Pos.	Nation	Player
—	FW	NGA	Johnson Nsumoh (released and joined (Argentina) Deportivo Riestra)

=== Inter Bratislava ===
In: Note: Flags indicate national team as defined under FIFA eligibility rules; some limited exceptions apply. Players may hold more than one non-FIFA nationality.

No.	Pos.	Nation	Player

Out: Note: Flags indicate national team as defined under FIFA eligibility rules; some limited exceptions apply. Players may hold more than one non-FIFA nationality.

No.	Pos.	Nation	Player
—	FW	BRA	Arthur Legnani (to (Slovakia) Dynamo Malženice)
