= List of Slovak football transfers summer 2026 =

== Nike Liga ==
=== ŠK Slovan Bratislava ===
In: Note: Flags indicate national team as defined under FIFA eligibility rules; some limited exceptions apply. Players may hold more than one non-FIFA nationality.

| No. | Pos. | Nation | Player |
|---|---|---|---|
| 1 | GK | SRB | Aleksandar Popović (from Dunajská Streda) |
| 2 | DF | SVK | Samuel Kozlovský (from (Poland) Widzew Łódź) |
| — | MF | BIH | Alen Mustafić (loan return from KFC Komárno) |
| 71 | DF | CZE | Jurij Medveděv (loan return from 1. FC Tatran Prešov) |
| 70 | MF | PAN | Cristian Martínez (from (Israel) Kiryat Shmona) |
| — | FW | GAM | Suleiman Camara (from (Spain) Racing de Santander) |
| — | FW | SVK | Roman Čerepkai (from FC Košice) |
| — | DF | GUI | Sahmkou Camara (on loan from (Czech Republic) Slavia Prague) |

Out: Note: Flags indicate national team as defined under FIFA eligibility rules; some limited exceptions apply. Players may hold more than one non-FIFA nationality.

| No. | Pos. | Nation | Player |
|---|---|---|---|
| — | MF | SVK | Vladimír Weiss (Retired) |
| — | MF | SVK | Róbert Mak (Retired) |
| — | DF | GEO | Guram Kashia (Retired) |
| — | GK | SVK | Martin Trnovský (Released and joined Podbrezová) |
| — | DF | CMR | Sidoine Fogning (loan return to (Portugal) Boavista F.C.) |
| — | MF | SVK | Maxim Mateáš (to FC Košice) |
| — | MF | SVK | Tomáš Marušin (to MFK Ružomberok) |
| 10 | MF | CRO | Niko Janković (loan return to (Croatia) Rijeka) |
| — | DF | GHA | Zuberu Sharani (to (Israel) Hapoel Jerusalem F.C.) |
| — | FW | GHA | Kelvin Ofori (Released and joined (Greece) Atromitos F.C.) |

=== FC DAC 1904 Dunajská Streda ===
In: Note: Flags indicate national team as defined under FIFA eligibility rules; some limited exceptions apply. Players may hold more than one non-FIFA nationality.

| No. | Pos. | Nation | Player |
|---|---|---|---|
| - | DF | NOR | Simen Juklerød (from (Belgium) Sint-Truidense VV) |
| - | MF | SRB | Uroš Kabić (from (Serbia) OFK Beograd) |
| - | MF | PAN | Joseph Pacheco (from (Panama) C.D. Plaza Amador) |
| - | DF | SLO | Žan Trontelj (from (Ukraine) FC Zorya Luhansk) |
| — | FW | GHA | Prince Owusu (from (Azerbaijan) Qabala İK) |
| 16 | FW | SVK | Pavol Šafranko (from Free Agent) |

Out: Note: Flags indicate national team as defined under FIFA eligibility rules; some limited exceptions apply. Players may hold more than one non-FIFA nationality.

| No. | Pos. | Nation | Player |
|---|---|---|---|
| — | GK | SRB | Aleksandar Popović (to Slovan Bratislava) |
| 24 | MF | SVK | Christián Herc (to (Hungary) Kisvárda FC) |
| — | MF | HUN | Levente Bősze (to (Italy) Como 1907) |
| — | DF | SVK | Matúš Kmeť (loan return to (United States) Minnesota United FC) |
| — | FW | MNE | Viktor Đukanović (loan return to (Sweden) Hammarby ) |
| — | DF | CRO | Ivan Dolček (to (Croatia) NK Osijek)} |
| — | DF | HUN | Márk Csinger (to (Hungary) Győri ETO FC)} |
| — | DF | ESP | Alex Méndez (to (Greece) Asteras Tripolis F.C.)} |
| — | FW | CRO | Bartol Barišić (to (Bosnia and Herzegovina) FK Sarajevo)} |
| — | FW | BEL | Rabby Mateta Pepa (to (Belgium) Francs Borains) |
| — | GK | GER | Jan-Christoph Bartels (Released) |

=== FC Spartak Trnava ===
In: Note: Flags indicate national team as defined under FIFA eligibility rules; some limited exceptions apply. Players may hold more than one non-FIFA nationality.

| No. | Pos. | Nation | Player |
|---|---|---|---|
| — | MF | SVK | Roman Begala (from Tatran Prešov) |
| — | GK | CZE | Martin Janáček (from (Albania) AF Elbasani) |
| — | DF | KOS | Melos Bajrami (from (Albania) Vllaznia Shkodër) |
| — | FW | NED | Tijmen Wildeboer (from Free Agent) |
| — | DF | GHA | Ivan Anokye Mensah (from (Czech Republic) AC Sparta Prague) |
| — | MF | SWE | Lorent Mehmeti (from (Sweden) Nordic United FC) |
| — | GK | SLO | Oskar Casagrande (from (Slovenia) NK Jesenice) |
| — | MF | SVK | Kristián Pavol Stručka (from OFK Dynamo Malženice) |
| — | DF | ESP | Juanmi Carrión (from Free Agent) |
| — | DF | SVK | Marek Ujlaky (loan return from MFK Skalica) |
| — | MF | SVK | Filip Trello (loan return from OFK Dynamo Malženice) |
| — | MF | SVK | Dávid Bukovský (loan return from OFK Dynamo Malženice) |
| — | FW | SVK | David Polťák (loan return from OFK Dynamo Malženice) |
| — | GK | SVK | Benjamín Száraz (from KFC Komárno) |
| — | DF | SVK | Lukáš Fabiš (from MFK Skalica) |
| — | MF | GHA | Dennis Konney (from (Portugal) FC Porto B) |
| 17 | DF | UKR | Denys Taraduda (loan return from 1. FC Tatran Prešov) |

Out: Note: Flags indicate national team as defined under FIFA eligibility rules; some limited exceptions apply. Players may hold more than one non-FIFA nationality.

| No. | Pos. | Nation | Player |
|---|---|---|---|
| 1 | GK | SLO | Žiga Frelih (released and joined (Slovenia) NK Celje) |
| 57 | FW | SVK | Michal Ďuriš (to MFK Dukla Banská Bystrica) |
| 93 | FW | TOG | Idjessi Metsoko (loan return to (Czech Republic) FC Viktoria Plzeň) |
| 12 | FW | NGR | Abdulrahman Taiwo (loan return to (Latvia) Riga FC) |
| 3 | DF | CRO | Roko Jureškin (Released and joined (Spain) CD Tenerife) |
| 14 | MF | CZE | Miloš Kratochvíl (Released and joined (Czech Republic) FC Zlín) |
| 15 | DF | SRB | Lazar Stojsavljević (Released and joined (Serbia) FK TSC) |
| 17 | MF | SVK | Jakub Paur (Released and joined AS Trenčín) |
| 21 | DF | SVK | Patrick Karhan (on loan to MFK Skalica) |
| 27 | DF | SVK | Michal Tomič (on loan to (Czech Republic) FK Dukla Prague) |
| 41 | GK | SVK | Patrik Vasiľ (on loan to Zlaté Moravce) |
| 17 | DF | UKR | Denys Taraduda (to (Czech Republic) FK Teplice) |
| — | DF | CZE | Filip Twardzik (Released and joined MFK Skalica) |
| — | MF | NGR | Hilary Gong (Released) |

=== MŠK Žilina ===
In: Note: Flags indicate national team as defined under FIFA eligibility rules; some limited exceptions apply. Players may hold more than one non-FIFA nationality.

| No. | Pos. | Nation | Player |
|---|---|---|---|
| — | GK | SVK | Dávid Šípoš (from FC Košice) |
| - | DF | SWE | Johan Albin (from (Sweden) IK Oddevold) |
| - | MF | SWE | Kenan Bilalović (on loan from (Scotland) Aberdeen) |

Out: Note: Flags indicate national team as defined under FIFA eligibility rules; some limited exceptions apply. Players may hold more than one non-FIFA nationality.

| No. | Pos. | Nation | Player |
|---|---|---|---|
| — | GK | CZE | Dominik Šváček (loan return to (Czech Republic) FC Zbrojovka Brno) |
| — | MF | HUN | Regő Szánthó (to MFK Dukla Banská Bystrica) |
| — | MF | ARG | Nehuén Mendoza (loan return to (Argentina) Instituto Atlético Central Córdoba) |
| — | DF | SVK | Tobiáš Pališčák (to (Czech Republic) Viktoria Plzeň) |

=== MFK Ružomberok ===
In: Note: Flags indicate national team as defined under FIFA eligibility rules; some limited exceptions apply. Players may hold more than one non-FIFA nationality.

| No. | Pos. | Nation | Player |
|---|---|---|---|
| 8 | MF | SVK | Ján Murgaš (from (Austria) Admira Wacker) |
| — | FW | CZE | Matěj Koubek (from (Czech Republic) FC Zlín) |
| 9 | FW | SVK | Martin Boďa (loan return from MFK Skalica) |
| — | MF | CZE | Filip Souček (from 1. FC Tatran Prešov) |
| - | MF | SVK | Štefan Gerec (from MFK Dukla Banská Bystrica) |
| — | FW | CZE | Vojtěch Hranoš (from (Czech Republic) AC Sparta Prague) |
| — | DF | SVK | Tomáš Marušin (from ŠK Slovan Bratislava) |
| — | GK | SVK | Ivan Krajčírik (on loan from (Czech Republic) FC Slovan Liberec) |
| — | MF | CZE | Dominik Kostka (from (Czech Republic) FK Mladá Boleslav) |

Out: Note: Flags indicate national team as defined under FIFA eligibility rules; some limited exceptions apply. Players may hold more than one non-FIFA nationality.

| No. | Pos. | Nation | Player |
|---|---|---|---|
| — | MF | SVK | Martin Chrien (to FK Železiarne Podbrezová) |
| 5 | DF | CZE | Tomáš Král (to loan return to (Czech Republic) Mladá Boleslav) |
| 25 | MF | CZE | Samuel Grygar (to loan return to (Czech Republic) Baník Ostrava) |
| 31 | MF | CZE | Lukáš Fila (to loan return to (Czech Republic) Mladá Boleslav) |
| 36 | DF | CZE | Lukáš Endl (to loan return to (Czech Republic) Karviná) |
| 19 | MF | SVK | Martin Gomola (to 1. FC Tatran Prešov) |
| 36 | DF | CZE | Ondřej Šašinka (to (Czech Republic) Karviná) |

=== FK Železiarne Podbrezová ===
In: Note: Flags indicate national team as defined under FIFA eligibility rules; some limited exceptions apply. Players may hold more than one non-FIFA nationality.

| No. | Pos. | Nation | Player |
|---|---|---|---|
| — | MF | SVK | Martin Chrien (from MFK Ružomberok) |
| — | GK | SVK | Martin Trnovský (from Slovan) |
| — | MF | SVK | Jakub Michlik (from FK Pohronie) |
| 12 | MF | SVK | Tobiáš Diviš (from FK Pohronie) |
| 4 | DF | GHA | Ebenezer Kpozo (from FK Pohronie) |
| 14 | MF | CAF | Séverin Tatolna (loan return from 1. FC Tatran Prešov) |
| — | DF | CZE | Radek Kejval (from (Czech Republic) FK Viktoria Žižkov) |
| — | FW | CRO | Karlo Miljanić (from FC Košice) |
| — | DF | GAM | Saibo Saidy (from (Finland) Mikkelin Palloilijat) |
| — | MF | SVK | Matúš Rusnák (on loan from (Czech Republic) Baník Ostrava) |
| — | DF | SVK | Ján Krivák (from FC Košice) |
| -- | MF | NGR | Samson Tijani (on loan from (Czech Republic) Dukla Prague) |

Out: Note: Flags indicate national team as defined under FIFA eligibility rules; some limited exceptions apply. Players may hold more than one non-FIFA nationality.

| No. | Pos. | Nation | Player |
|---|---|---|---|
| 88 | DF | SVK | Branislav Niňaj (to FC Petržalka) |
| 11 | MF | SVK | Matúš Marcin (Retired) |
| 88 | FW | SVK | Andy Masaryk (to KFC Komárno) |
| — | FW | GAM | Ousman Kujabi (to (Czech Republic) FK Viktoria Žižkov) |
| — | DF | EST | Kevor Palumets (to FC Košice) |
| 7 | FW | SVK | Roland Galčík (to (Portugal) Rio Ave F.C.) |
| 95 | GK | SVK | Matej Jurička (to (Finland) IF Gnistan) |
| — | DF | SVK | Filip Mielke (to (Czech Republic) FC Hradec Králové) |
| 10 | FW | CZE | Radek Šiler (to (Portugal) Rio Ave F.C.) |

=== Dukla Banská Bystrica ===
In: Note: Flags indicate national team as defined under FIFA eligibility rules; some limited exceptions apply. Players may hold more than one non-FIFA nationality.

| No. | Pos. | Nation | Player |
|---|---|---|---|
| — | FW | SVK | Michal Ďuriš (from FC Spartak Trnava) |
| - | DF | NGR | Alabi Adewale (from Malženice) |
| — | DF | SVK | Kristián Vallo (from (Czech Republic) MFK Karviná) |
| - | FW | SVK | Róbert Polievka (from (Hungary) MTK Budapest FC) |
| 4 | MF | SVK | Viktor Tóth (from MFK Zvolen) |
| — | MF | HUN | Regő Szánthó (from MŠK Žilina) |
| — | DF | SVK | Mikuláš Bakaľa (from (Poland) Polonia Bytom) |
| — | GK | SVK | Jakub Trefil (from (Czech Republic) SK Sigma Olomouc) |
| — | DF | BRA | Maik (from (Brazil) São Paulo FC) |

Out: Note: Flags indicate national team as defined under FIFA eligibility rules; some limited exceptions apply. Players may hold more than one non-FIFA nationality.

| No. | Pos. | Nation | Player |
|---|---|---|---|
| 8 | MF | BRA | Davi Alves (Released and joined MFK Zvolen) |
| 15 | FW | SVK | Štefan Gerec (Released and joined MFK Ružomberok) |
| 10 | MF | SVK | Branislav Ľupták (Released) |
| 28 | GK | NGR | Mathew Yakubu (Released) |
| 11 | FW | SRB | Boris Krstič (Released) |
| 18 | DF | CRO | Ogi Jankelić (Released) |
| 5 | DF | JPN | Taiyo Ushiyama (Released and joined (Czech Republic) 1. SK Prostějov) |
| 27 | FW | SVK | Oliver Reiter (Released) |

=== AS Trenčín ===
In: Note: Flags indicate national team as defined under FIFA eligibility rules; some limited exceptions apply. Players may hold more than one non-FIFA nationality.

| No. | Pos. | Nation | Player |
|---|---|---|---|
| — | DF | MLI | Issa Traoré (on loan from (Germany) Bayer 04 Leverkusen) |
| — | DF | SRB | Nikola Jovanović (from (Serbia) FK Mačva Šabac) |
| — | MF | ESP | Pablo González (from (Cyprus) Ethnikos Achna FC) |
| — | MF | SVK | Jakub Paur (from FC Spartak Trnava) |
| — | FW | DEN | Mikkel Boye (from (Denmark) HB Køge) |

Out: Note: Flags indicate national team as defined under FIFA eligibility rules; some limited exceptions apply. Players may hold more than one non-FIFA nationality.

| No. | Pos. | Nation | Player |
|---|---|---|---|
| — | MF | SVK | Jakub Holúbek (Retired) |
| 99 | FW | NED | Pepijn Doesburg (Released and joined (Oman) Al-Shabab SC (Seeb)) |
| 83 | GK | BIH | Luka Damjanović (Retired) |
| 26 | MF | NED | Richie Musaba (Released and joined (Italy) ASD Imperia) |
| 10 | MF | TTO | Molik Khan (Released and joined (Turkey) Vanspor F.K.) |
| — | FW | NGR | Cody David (to (Ukraine) FC LNZ Cherkasy) |
| 16 | MF | NIR | Sean Goss (to (Poland) Stal Rzeszów) |
| 11 | FW | ENG | Roshaun Mathurin (to (Scotland) Kilmarnock F.C.) |
| - | DF | SVK | Samuel Bagín (to FC ViOn Zlaté Moravce) |
| 12 | DF | SVK | Nikolas Brandis (to (Netherlands) FC Groningen) |

=== MFK Skalica ===
In: Note: Flags indicate national team as defined under FIFA eligibility rules; some limited exceptions apply. Players may hold more than one non-FIFA nationality.

| No. | Pos. | Nation | Player |
|---|---|---|---|
| 10 | MF | GEO | Levan Nonikashvili (from FC ViOn Zlaté Moravce) |
| — | DF | SVK | Martin Rýzek (on loan from (Czech Republic) FC Slovan Liberec) |

Out: Note: Flags indicate national team as defined under FIFA eligibility rules; some limited exceptions apply. Players may hold more than one non-FIFA nationality.

| No. | Pos. | Nation | Player |
|---|---|---|---|
| 30 | FW | NGR | Abbati Abdullahi (loan return to (Poland) Górnik Zabrze) |
| 29 | DF | SVK | Marek Ujlaky (loan return to Spartak Trnava) |
| 5 | DF | SVK | Michal Ranko (Released) |
| 24 | MF | CZE | Tomáš Smejkal (Released) |
| 71 | FW | SVK | Lukáš Leginus (to KFC Komárno) |
| 11 | DF | SVK | Lukáš Fabiš (Released) |
| 23 | DF | CRO | Mario Šuver (Released) |
| 25 | MF | SVK | Adam Gaži (to (Czech Republic) FC Zlín) |

=== MFK Zemplín Michalovce ===
In: Note: Flags indicate national team as defined under FIFA eligibility rules; some limited exceptions apply. Players may hold more than one non-FIFA nationality.

| No. | Pos. | Nation | Player |
|---|---|---|---|
| 99 | FW | COD | Elvis Mashike (from KFC Komárno) |
| — | MF | ENG | Tommy Pilling (from (England) Liverpool Academy) |
| — | DF | SVK | Martin Koscelník (from (Czech Republic) 1. FC Slovácko) |

Out: Note: Flags indicate national team as defined under FIFA eligibility rules; some limited exceptions apply. Players may hold more than one non-FIFA nationality.

| No. | Pos. | Nation | Player |
|---|---|---|---|
| — | MF | ESP | Samuel Ramos (to (Scotland) St Mirren F.C.) |
| 15 | DF | SRB | Lazar Žaknić (Released and joined (Bahrain) Manama SC) |
| 51 | MF | SVK | Stanislav Danko (Released and joined MŠK Tesla Stropkov) |
| 61 | MF | SVK | Matúš Begala (to (Poland) GKS Tychy) |
| 40 | FW | SWE | Hugo Ahl (to (Czech Republic) FK Jablonec) |
| 33 | DF | GRE | Christos Makrygiannis (to (Greece) Niki Volos F.C.) |

=== FC Košice ===
In: Note: Flags indicate national team as defined under FIFA eligibility rules; some limited exceptions apply. Players may hold more than one non-FIFA nationality.

| No. | Pos. | Nation | Player |
|---|---|---|---|
| — | MF | SVK | Maxim Mateáš (from ŠK Slovan Bratislava) |
| — | FW | MNE | Aleksa Maraš (from (Bulgaria) Botev Plovdiv) |
| — | FW | BIH | Aleksandar Kahvić (from (Germany) SSV Ulm 1846) |
| — | FW | SVK | Tomáš Husarčík (from MFK Ružomberok) |
| — | DF | EST | Kevor Palumets (from FK Železiarne Podbrezová) |
| - | DF | ENG | Taylor Moore (from Free Agent) |

Out: Note: Flags indicate national team as defined under FIFA eligibility rules; some limited exceptions apply. Players may hold more than one non-FIFA nationality.

| No. | Pos. | Nation | Player |
|---|---|---|---|
| 1 | GK | SVK | Dávid Šípoš (to MŠK Žilina) |
| 17 | FW | HUN | Mátyás Kovács (loan return to (Hungary) MTK Budapest) |
| 87 | FW | MNE | Vladimir Perišić (loan return to (Czech Republic) SK Slavia Prague) |
| — | FW | CRO | Karlo Miljanić (to FK Železiarne Podbrezová) |
| TBA | DF | SVK | Ján Krivák (to FK Železiarne Podbrezová) |
| — | FW | SVK | Roman Čerepkai (to ŠK Slovan Bratislava) |

=== KFC Komárno ===
In: Note: Flags indicate national team as defined under FIFA eligibility rules; some limited exceptions apply. Players may hold more than one non-FIFA nationality.

| No. | Pos. | Nation | Player |
|---|---|---|---|
| — | FW | SVK | Lukáš Leginus (from MFK Skalica) |
| — | FW | SVK | Andy Masaryk (from FK Železiarne Podbrezová) |
| — | MF | SVK | Ján Bernát (from 1. FC Tatran Prešov) |
| — | GK | SVK | Branislav Pindroch (from (Poland) GKS Górnik Łęczna) |
| — | DF | BRA | Matheus Leoni (from (Bulgaria) FC Dobrudzha Dobrich) |
| — | FW | SVK | Jakub Sylvestr (from MFK Zvolen) |
| — | FW | NGR | Yunusa Muritala (from (Czech Republic) SK Sigma Olomouc) |

Out: Note: Flags indicate national team as defined under FIFA eligibility rules; some limited exceptions apply. Players may hold more than one non-FIFA nationality.

| No. | Pos. | Nation | Player |
|---|---|---|---|
| 4 | MF | BIH | Alen Mustafić (loan return to Slovan Bratislava) |
| 9 | FW | SVK | Martin Boďa (loan return to Ružomberok) |
| 27 | FW | USA | Zyen Jones (Released) |
| 98 | MF | HUN | Patrik Szűcs (loan return to (Hungary) MTK Budapest) |
| 99 | FW | COD | Elvis Mashike (Released and joined Michalovce) |
| 24 | DF | CZE | Ondřej Rudzan (Released and joined (Indonesia) PSIM Yogyakarta) |
| 20 | MF | SVK | Martin Gamboš (Released) |
| 32 | GK | GER | Sebastian Jung (loan return to (Germany) Greuther Fürth) |
| 77 | MF | SVK | Martin Mišovič (loan return to Slovan Bratislava) |

== MONACObet liga ==
=== Tatran Prešov ===
In: Note: Flags indicate national team as defined under FIFA eligibility rules; some limited exceptions apply. Players may hold more than one non-FIFA nationality.

| No. | Pos. | Nation | Player |
|---|---|---|---|
| — | MF | SVK | Martin Gomola (from MFK Ružomberok) |

Out: Note: Flags indicate national team as defined under FIFA eligibility rules; some limited exceptions apply. Players may hold more than one non-FIFA nationality.

| No. | Pos. | Nation | Player |
|---|---|---|---|
| — | MF | CZE | Filip Souček (to MFK Ružomberok) |
| — | GK | SVK | Pavol Bajza (to FC Nitra) |
| 33 | DF | GER | Moritz Römling (Released and joined (Malta) Hibernians F.C.) |
| 71 | DF | CZE | Jurij Medveděv (loan return to Slovan Bratislava) |
| 17 | DF | UKR | Denys Taraduda (loan return to Spartak Trnava) |
| 55 | DF | UKR | Taras Bondarenko (Released and joined (Serbia) FK Mladost Lučani) |
| 29 | MF | HAI | Dominique Simon (loan return to (Czech Republic) Pardubice) |
| 26 | FW | BRA | Gabriel Barbosa (loan return to (Poland) Górnik Zabrze) |
| 21 | MF | SVK | Ján Bernát (Released and joined KFC Komárno) |
| 14 | MF | CAF | Séverin Tatolna (loan return to Podbrezová) |

=== FK Pohronie ===
In: Note: Flags indicate national team as defined under FIFA eligibility rules; some limited exceptions apply. Players may hold more than one non-FIFA nationality.

| No. | Pos. | Nation | Player |
|---|---|---|---|
| — | DF | SVK | Mário Mrva (from FC ViOn Zlaté Moravce) |
| 29 | FW | SVK | Marek Kuzma (from FC ViOn Zlaté Moravce) |

Out: Note: Flags indicate national team as defined under FIFA eligibility rules; some limited exceptions apply. Players may hold more than one non-FIFA nationality.

| No. | Pos. | Nation | Player |
|---|---|---|---|
| — | DF | SVK | Martin Dobrotka (Retired) |
| 12 | MF | SVK | Tobiáš Diviš (to FK Železiarne Podbrezová) |
| 1 | GK | SVK | Ivan Rehák (Released) |
| 3 | DF | SVK | Roland Buhaj (Released) |
| 13 | MF | GEO | Davit Skhirtladze (Released and joined (Georgia (country)) FC Telavi) |
| 4 | DF | GHA | Ebenezer Kpozo (to FK Železiarne Podbrezová) |
| 14 | MF | NGR | James Falana (Released) |
| 16 | MF | SVK | Samuel Gresko (to Slovan B) |
| — | MF | SVK | Jakub Michlik (to FK Železiarne Podbrezová) |

=== FC ViOn Zlaté Moravce ===
In: Note: Flags indicate national team as defined under FIFA eligibility rules; some limited exceptions apply. Players may hold more than one non-FIFA nationality.

| No. | Pos. | Nation | Player |
|---|---|---|---|
| 41 | GK | SVK | Patrik Vasiľ (on loan from FC Spartak Trnava) |
| - | DF | SVK | Samuel Bagín (from AS Trenčín) |

Out: Note: Flags indicate national team as defined under FIFA eligibility rules; some limited exceptions apply. Players may hold more than one non-FIFA nationality.

| No. | Pos. | Nation | Player |
|---|---|---|---|
| 4 | DF | CZE | Matěj Helebrand (Released) |
| 11 | MF | SVK | Denis Baumgartner (Released) |
| 27 | MF | SVK | Marko Totka (Released and joined Šamorín) |
| 44 | DF | SVK | Timotej Záhumenský (Released) |
| 13 | MF | CZE | Vojtěch Kubista (Released) |
| 21 | DF | CZE | Jan Kadlec (Released) |
| 31 | GK | SVK | Gregor Tóth (Released) |
| 16 | MF | SVK | Karol Mondek (Released and joined FC Nitra) |
| 45 | FW | SVK | Filip Balaj (to FC Nitra) |
| 5 | DF | SVK | Mário Mrva (to FK Pohronie) |
| 10 | MF | GEO | Levan Nonikashvili (to MFK Skalica) |
| 7 | MF | SVK | Robert Stareček (to Lehota pod Vtáčnikom) |
| — | DF | SVK | Jaroslav Holp (to AS Trenčín) |
| 29 | FW | SVK | Marek Kuzma (to FK Pohronie) |

=== FK Inter Bratislava ===
In: Note: Flags indicate national team as defined under FIFA eligibility rules; some limited exceptions apply. Players may hold more than one non-FIFA nationality.

| No. | Pos. | Nation | Player |

Out: Note: Flags indicate national team as defined under FIFA eligibility rules; some limited exceptions apply. Players may hold more than one non-FIFA nationality.

| No. | Pos. | Nation | Player |
|---|---|---|---|
| 7 | FW | SVK | Karol Mészáros (Released and joined (Austria) FC Andau) |
| 10 | MF | SVK | Boris Turčák (Released) |
| 30 | GK | SVK | Martin Danihel (Released) |
| 23 | MF | ESP | Miki García (Released) |

=== FC Petržalka ===
In: Note: Flags indicate national team as defined under FIFA eligibility rules; some limited exceptions apply. Players may hold more than one non-FIFA nationality.

| No. | Pos. | Nation | Player |
|---|---|---|---|
| — | DF | SVK | Branislav Niňaj (from FK Železiarne Podbrezová) |
| — | FW | NGR | Elvis Isaac (from Slávia TU Košice) |

Out: Note: Flags indicate national team as defined under FIFA eligibility rules; some limited exceptions apply. Players may hold more than one non-FIFA nationality.

| No. | Pos. | Nation | Player |
|---|---|---|---|
| — | FW | GHA | Frank Appiah (to (Czech Republic) FC Zlín) |
| — | MF | SVK | Matej Riznic (to (Czech Republic) FK Teplice) |
