= Fedor Kasana =

Slovak footballer (born 2008)

Personal information
- Full name: Fedor Kasana
- Date of birth: 9 April 2008 (age 18)
- Place of birth: Slovakia
- Position: Centre-forward

Team information
- Current team: AS Trenčín
- Number: 5

Youth career
- 2023–2025: AS Trenčín

Senior career*
Years	Team	Apps	(Gls)
2025	AS Trenčín B		
2025–	AS Trenčín	10	(0)

International career
- Slovakia U18
- * Club domestic league appearances and goals as of 21 September 2026

Fedor Kasana (born 9 April 2008) is a Slovak professional footballer who currently played for Slovak first division club AS Trenčín, as a centre forward. He is considered a talented player.

== Club career ==
=== Trenčín ===
Kasana scored a hat-trick in a 3–0 away win against FK Rača while playing for Trenčín B in the 3. Liga.

Kasana made his league debut for AS Trenčín in a 1–1 draw against MFK Skalica, coming on as a substitute for Adrián Fiala in the 61st minute. He scored his first goal for the club in the 3rd round of the 2025–26 Slovak Cup, scoring the winning goal in a 3–1 win against OFK Dynamo Malženice. Kasana received his first start for Trenčín in a 4–0 loss against FC Spartak Trnava, scoring an own goal in the 14th minute after a free kick taken by Roman Procházka.

== International career ==
On 5 September 2025, Kasana started in a match for the Slovakia national under-18 football team, played 59 minutes in a 2–2 draw against Czech Republic U18.
