= Shakhmurza Adyrbekov =

Kazakhstani footballer

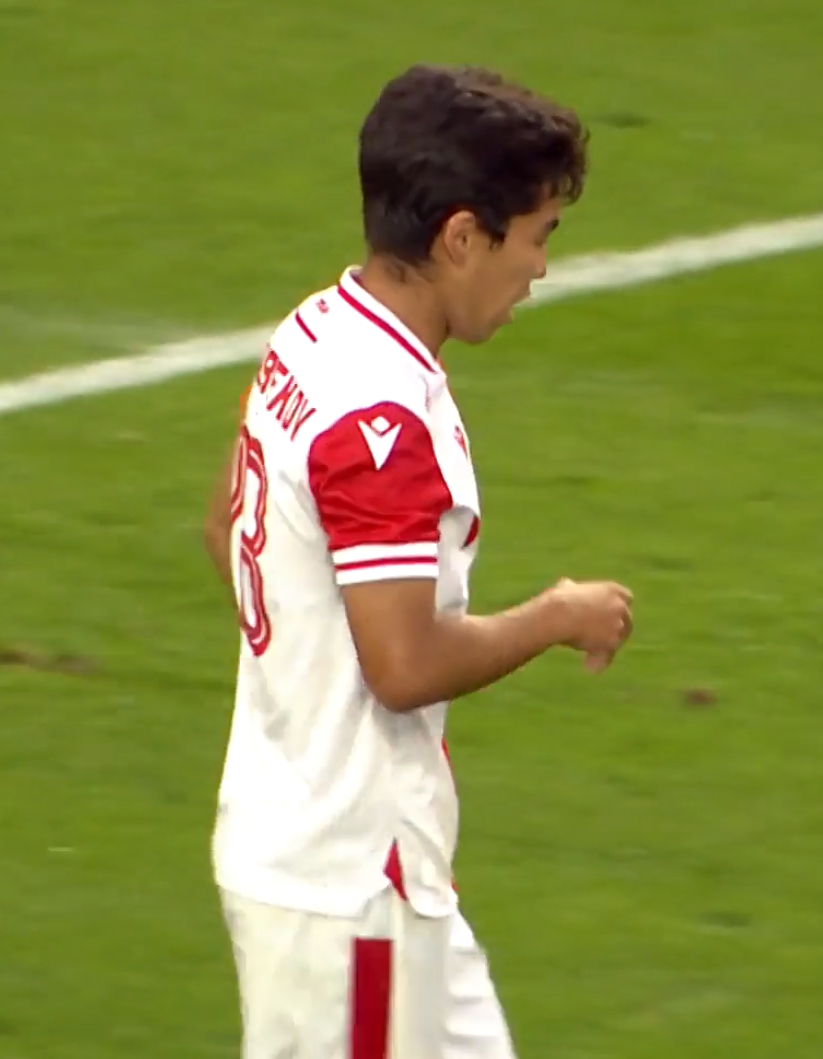
- Adyrbekov playing with Trenčín

Personal information
- Full name: Шахмурза Адырбеков
- Date of birth: July 5, 2006 (age 20)
- Place of birth: Kazakhstan
- Height: 1.76 m (5 ft 9 in)
- Position: Attacking midfielder

Team information
- Current team: AS Trenčín
- Number: 28

Youth career
- –2025: FC Tobol

Senior career*
Years	Team	Apps	(Gls)
2025	FC Tobol	3	(0)
2025	AS Trenčín B		
2025–	AS Trenčín	10	(0)

International career^{‡}
2025–	Kazakhstan U21	0	(0)
- * Club domestic league appearances and goals as of 25 May 2026 ‡ National team caps and goals as of 1 January 2025

Shakhmurza Adyrbekov (Kazakh: Шахмурза Адырбеков; born 5 July 2006) is a Kazakhstani footballer who currently plays for Slovak First Football League club AS Trenčín.

He currently represents the Kazakhstan national under-21 football team.

Adyrbekov is currently the only Kazakh football player to play for clubs of the highest European leagues outside the post-Soviet era.

== Club career ==
=== Early career ===
Adyrbekov went through all the youth categories in the Tobol academy, where he played for the youth and the B team. In the matches of the QJ League he played 18 games and scored four goals. He also made 3 senior appearances for Tobol in the Kazakhstan Cup. In January 2025, Adyrbekov joined Russian Second League club FC Spartak Kostroma on a trial. He made several appearances for Spartak, getting one assist.

=== Trenčin ===
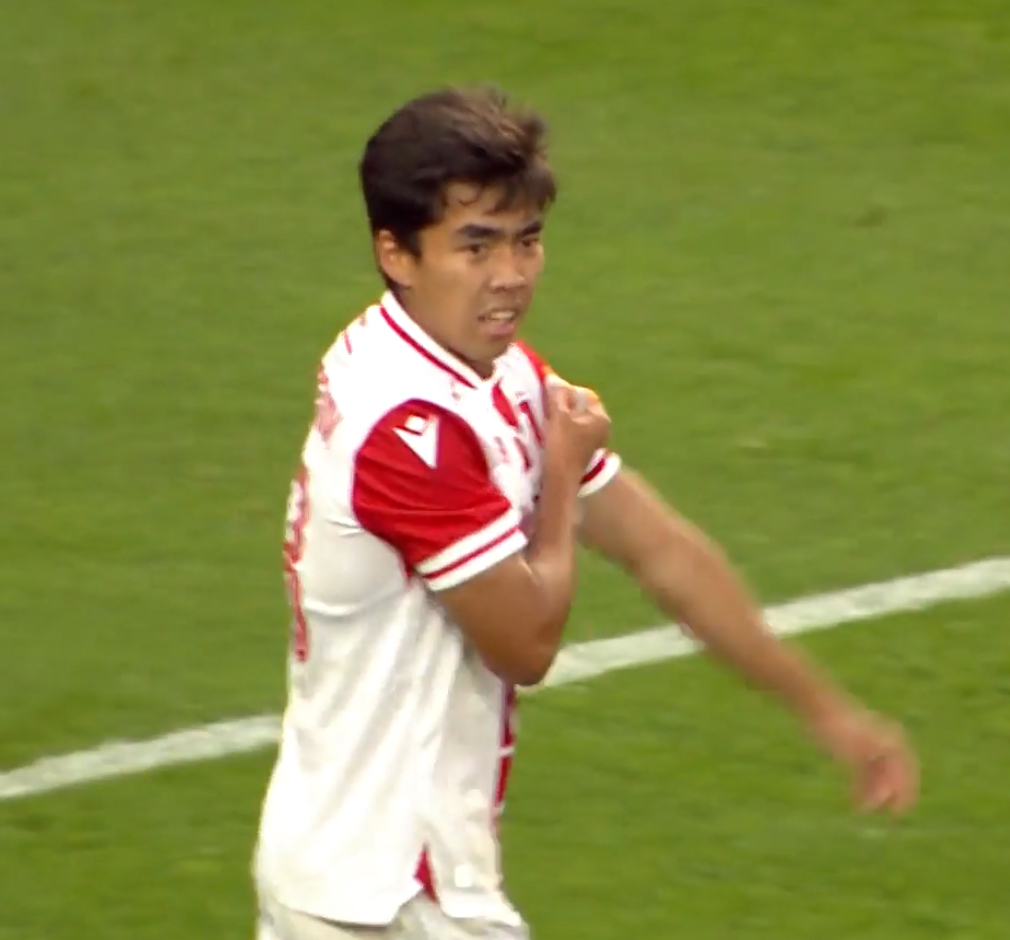
Adyrbekov playing against Slovan Bratislava.

On 19 September 2025, it was announced that Adyrbekov would be joining the A-team of AS Trenčín after good performances for the club's B team. He signed a one-year contract with an option for a further year. He made his debut for the club in a 2–0 defeat against FK Železiarne Podbrezová, coming off the bench as a substitute in the 64th minute for Adrián Fiala. Adyrbekov made his first start in a 2–1 home loss against league champions Slovan Bratislava, playing 61 minutes. A few days later he came off the bench at half-time in a match against MFK Zemplín Michalovce. After that match, Adyrbekov stopped appearing in the first team, the B team and the U-19 team for almost an entire month. Before the winter break, he would make two more appearances, starting a match against FC DAC 1904 Dunajská Streda, and playing the last nine minutes of a 0–0 draw against league newcomers, Tatran Prešov. Adyrbekov's first goal contribution would come in the Slovak Cup, assisting a goal scored by Adrián Fiala after coming off the bench in the 85th minute of the game.

== International career ==
On 7 November 2025, Adyrbekov was called up to the Kazakhstan national under-21 football team ahead of the qualifying rounds of the 2027 European Youth Championship against Slovakia and Moldova.
