= Justen Kranthove =

Dutch footballer (born 2000)

Personal information
- Full name: Justen Shelden Kranthove
- Date of birth: 19 September 2000 (age 26)
- Place of birth: Amsterdam, Netherlands
- Height: 1.93 m (6 ft 4 in)
- Position: Centre-back

Team information
- Current team: AS Trenčín
- Number: 19

Youth career
- –2018: AFC '34
- 2018–2020: Leicester City

Senior career*
Years	Team	Apps	(Gls)
2021–2023	Slovan Liberec	1	(0)
2021–2022	→ Slovan Liberec B	15	(1)
2023	→ Humenné (loan)	13	(2)
2023–2024	Humenné	29	(1)
2024	Othellos Athienou	10	(0)
2025–	Trenčín	0	(0)
- * Club domestic league appearances and goals as of 22 June 2025

Justen Shelden Kranthove (born 19 September 2000) is a Dutch professional footballer who plays as a centre-back for Slovak club AS Trenčín.

== Career ==
As a youth player, Kranthove joined the academy of Dutch sixth division side AFC '34. In 2018, he joined the youth academy of Leicester City in the English Premier League.

In 2021, he signed for Czech club Slovan Liberec. On 31 July 2021, he debuted for Liberec during a 5–0 loss to Sparta Prague.
