= Emmanuel Uchegbu =

Nigerian footballer (born 2005)

Personal information
- Full name: Emmanuel Chimeroucheya Uchegbu
- Date of birth: 5 February 2005 (age 21)
- Position: Forward

Team information
- Current team: Crown Legacy FC
- Number: 70

Youth career
- Golden Boot Soccer Academy

Senior career*
Years	Team	Apps	(Gls)
–2023	Plateau United		
2023–2024	AS Trenčín	27	(4)
2025–	Crown Legacy FC	34	(8)

International career
2023–	Nigeria U20	3	(0)
- * Club domestic league appearances and goals as of 00:15 (UTC) 26 May 2026

Emmanuel Chimeroucheya Uchegbu (born 5 February 2005) is a Nigerian football player who plays for Crown Legacy FC in the MLS Next Pro.

== Club career ==
He was a member of the Golden Boot Soccer Academy. He also played for Plateau United in the Nigeria Professional Football League. He joined AS Trencin in September 2023 agreeing a two-year contract. He made his debut in the Slovak Super Liga on 25 February 2024, at home against Slovan Bratislava.

== International career ==
He scored for Nigeria U20 against a Moroccan U23 side in February 2023. He was a member of the Nigerian U20 team at the 2023 U-20 Africa Cup of Nations.

== Style of play ==
He has been described as a winger.
