= Franko Sabljić =

Bosnian footballer (born 2003)

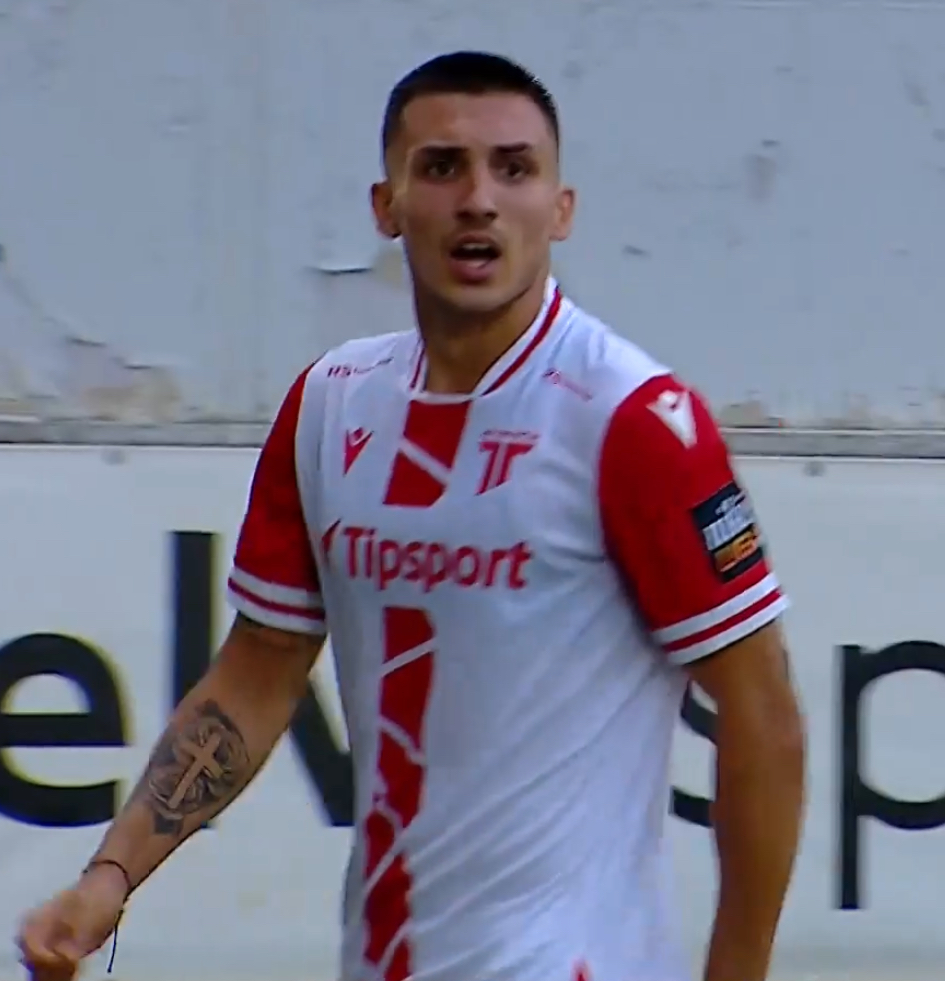
- Sabljić celebrating a goal on his Trenčín debut in 2025

Personal information
- Date of birth: September 17, 2003 (age 23)
- Place of birth: Mostar, Bosnia and Herzegovina
- Height: 1.95 m (6 ft 5 in)
- Position: Forward

Team information
- Current team: AS Trenčín
- Number: 70

Youth career
- 2018–2021: Zrinjski Mostar

Senior career*
| Years | Team | Apps | (Gls) |
| 2021–2025 | Zrinjski Mostar | 50 | (3) |
| 2024–2025 | NK Rudes | 11 | (1) |
| 2025– | AS Trenčín | 18 | (2) |

International career^{‡}
| 2021 | Bosnia and Herzegovina U19 | 4 | (1) |
| 2022 | Bosnia and Herzegovina U21 | 7 | (1) |
- * Club domestic league appearances and goals as of 31 December 2025 ‡ National team caps and goals as of 31 December 2025

Franko Sabljić (born 17 September 2003) is a Bosnian professional footballer who plays as a forward for Slovak First Football League club AS Trenčín.

While playing with Zrinjski, Sabljić helped the club become champion of Bosnia and Herzegovina twice in 2022 and in 2023, and also won the Bosnian Cup twice in 2023 and 2024.

He has also represented he U19 and U21 categories of Bosnia and Herzegovina.

== Club career ==
=== Zrinjski Mostar ===
Sabljić is a product of the HŠK Zrinjski Mostar, where he had been since the age of five. On 18 August 2021, Sabljić signed his first professional contract with the club, aged 17 years old. He made his debut for Zrinjski in a 5–0 friendly match win against Croatian 3rd tier side NK Trnje, where he also scored a hat-trick. With Zrinjski, Sabljić became the champion of Bosnia and Herzegovina twice in 2022 and in 2023, and won the Bosnian Cup twice in 2023 and 2024. In August 2024, Sabljič went on loan to the Croatian club NK Rudeš.

=== Trenčin ===
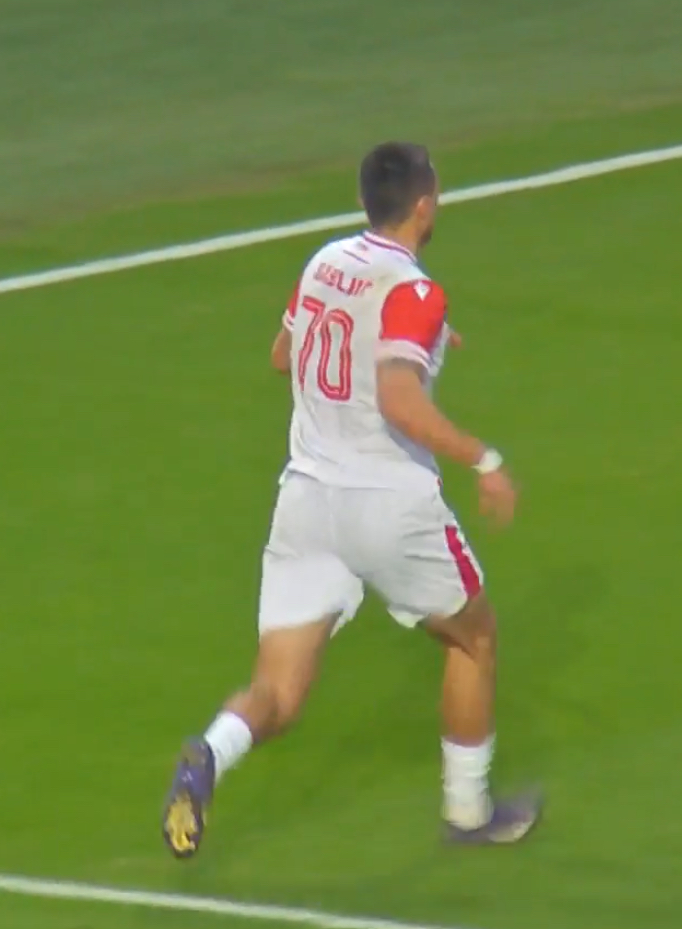
Sabljić celebrating his goal against Košice in 2025

On 7 July 2025, after the expiration of his contract at Zrinjski, it was announced that Sabljić would be joining Slovak first division side AS Trenčín, signing a three-year contract. He made his debut for Trenčín in a 2–1 win against KFC Komárno, where he scored the winning goal in the 74th minute. A few weeks later, Sabljić assisted the winning goal scored by Molik Khan in a 1–0 victory against FC Košice. Sabljić would have to wait until November until he scored his second goal for Trenčín, scoring the winning goal in a 2–0 win over [FC Košice.

== International career ==
Sabljić has represented both Bosnia and Herzegovina U19 and the U21 teams. He scored his first goal for the U21’s in a 2–1 win against Cyprus national under-21 football team, securing the only win for Bosnia in the 2025 UEFA European Under-21 Championship qualification.

== Honours ==
Zrinjski Mostar

- Premier League of Bosnia and Herzegovina: 2021–22, 2022–23
- Bosnia and Herzegovina Football Cup: 2023–24, 2024–25
