= Lukáš Skovajsa =

Slovak footballer

Personal information
- Date of birth: 27 March 1994 (age 32)
- Place of birth: Trenčín, Slovakia
- Height: 1.82 m (6 ft 0 in)
- Position: Defender

Team information
- Current team: AS Trenčín
- Number: 25

Youth career
- 2009–2013: AS Trenčín

Senior career*
Years	Team	Apps	(Gls)
2012–2019	AS Trenčín	118	(4)
2020	Dinamo București	11	(0)
2020–2023	Dynamo České Budějovice	54	(2)
2023–	AS Trenčín	52	(4)

International career^{‡}
2015–2016	Slovakia U21	5	(0)
- * Club domestic league appearances and goals as of 21 September 2026 ‡ National team caps and goals as of 28 March 2017

Lukáš Skovajsa (born 27 March 1994) is a Slovak footballer who plays for AS Trenčín in Niké Liga as a defender.

== Club career ==
He made his professional debut for AS Trenčín against Nitra at pod Zoborom on 6 October 2012, in a 1–2 win. Skovajsa completed the entirety of the match.

In January 2020, he joined Romanian club Dinamo București. he was released by Dinamo only eight months later.

On 3 July 2023, it was announced that Skovajsa returned to AS Trenčín.

== Career statistics ==
As of 26 May 2013

Club performance			League		Cup		Continental		Total	
Season	Club	League	Apps	Goals	Apps	Goals	Apps	Goals	Apps	Goals
Slovakia			League		Slovak Cup		Europe		Total	
2012–13	AS Trenčín	Corgoň Liga	1	0	1	0	0	0	2	0
Career total			1	0	1	0	0	0	2	0

== Honours ==
=== Club ===
AS Trenčín

- Fortuna Liga (2): 2014–15, 2015-16
- Slovak Cup (2): 2014–15, 2015-16
