= Dimitri Jepihhin =

Estonian footballer

Personal information
- Date of birth: 28 October 2005 (age 21)
- Place of birth: Tallinn, Estonia
- Position: Winger

Team information
- Current team: Trenčín
- Number: 22

Youth career
- 2013–2018: JK Tabasalu
- 2019–2022: Nõmme United

Senior career*
Years	Team	Apps	(Gls)
2021-2022	Nõmme United	34	(10)
2023–2024	Paide	33	(8)
2024–	Trenčín	14	(2)

International career^{‡}
2019	Estonia U15	2	(0)
2021	Estonia U17	8	(1)
2022	Estonia U18	3	(0)
2023	Estonia U19	6	(0)
2024–	Estonia U21	6	(0)
2025–	Estonia	1	(0)
- * Club domestic league appearances and goals as of 25 May 2026 ‡ National team caps and goals as of 9 August 2024

Dimitri Jepihhin (born 28 October 2005) is an Estonian professional footballer who currently plays as a winger for Slovak First Football League club AS Trenčín and the Estonia national team.

== Club career ==
Jepihhin started his career in the Esiliiga club Nõmme United before joining Meistriliiga side Paide Linnameeskond.

Jepihhin debuted in Meistriliiga in 2024 and quickly established himself as a backbone of the team that finished third in the league, qualifying for the Conference League first qualifying round. He ended the season with 8 goals and 6 assists in 33 games.

This form earned him a move to the Slovak First Football League club AS Trenčín. He scored his first goal for the club in a 3–2 away win against Banská Bystrica.

== International career ==
Jepihhin made his senior international debut for Estonia on 6 June 2025, in a 3–1 loss to Israel.
