= Tadeáš Hájovský =

Slovak footballer (born 2005)

Personal information
- Date of birth: 30 September 2005 (age 21)
- Place of birth: Bojnice, Slovakia
- Height: 1.76 m (5 ft 9 in)
- Position: Defensive midfielder

Team information
- Current team: AS Trenčín
- Number: 8

Youth career
- –2016: Prievidza
- 2016–2023: AS Trenčín

Senior career*
Years	Team	Apps	(Gls)
2023–	AS Trenčín	77	(3)

International career^{‡}
2022	Slovakia U17	5	(0)
2022–2023	Slovakia U18	6	(0)
2023–2024	Slovakia U19	7	(1)
2024–	Slovakia U21	3	(1)
2025–	Slovakia	1	(0)
- * Club domestic league appearances and goals as of 21 September 2026 ‡ National team caps and goals as of 7 June 2025

Tadeáš Hájovský (born 30 September 2005) is a Slovak professional footballer who plays as a defensive midfielder for Niké Liga club AS Trenčín.

== Club career ==
Hájovský joined the youth setup at AS Trenčín in 2016 and made his senior debut for the club during the 2023–24 season in the Niké Liga, coming on as a substitute in the 86th minute in a 0–0 draw against FC DAC 1904 Dunajská Streda.

He signed a new professional four-year contract with the club on 30 September 2025.

As of October 2025, he has made fifty-one appearances for the senior team, scoring two goals.
