= Samuel Bagín =

Slovak footballer (born 2004)

Personal information
- Date of birth: 8 February 2004 (age 22)
- Place of birth: Ilava, Slovakia
- Height: 1.89 m (6 ft 2 in)
- Position: Centre-back

Team information
- Current team: AS Trenčín
- Number: 2

Youth career
- –2014: Dubnica n. Váhom
- 2014–2022: AS Trenčín

Senior career*
Years	Team	Apps	(Gls)
2022–	AS Trenčín	41	(2)

International career^{‡}
2021–2022	Slovakia U18	3	(0)
2022–2023	Slovakia U19	4	(0)
2023–2024	Slovakia U20	3	(0)
2024–	Slovakia U21	2	(0)
- * Club domestic league appearances and goals as of 17 January 2026 ‡ National team caps and goals as of 9 September 2025

Samuel Bagín (born 8 February 2004) is a Slovak professional footballer who plays as a centre-back for Niké Liga club AS Trenčín.

== Club career ==
Bagín joined the youth setup at AS Trenčín in 2014. He made his senior debut for the club during the 2022–23 season in a 3–0 league loss against Dukla Banská Bystrica, playing the full match. In the following match against ViOn Zlaté Moravce, Bagín scored his first goal for Trenčin in the 38th minute. The game would end in a 1–1 draw.

On 17 November 2023, Bagín signed a new professional three-and-half-year contract with the club.

== Career statistics ==
Club	Season	Apps and goals		
AS Trenčín	2024–25	Niké Liga	12	0
Career total			12	0
