= Andrija Katić =

Serbian association footballer

Personal information
- Full name: Andrija Katić
- Date of birth: 17 February 2002 (age 24)
- Place of birth: Trstenik, FR Yugoslavia
- Height: 1.95 m (6 ft 5 in)
- Position: Goalkeeper

Team information
- Current team: Trenčín
- Number: 1

Youth career
- Prva Petoletka
- –2018: Jagodina
- 2018–2019: Brodarac
- 2019–: Red Star Belgrade

Senior career*
Years	Team	Apps	(Gls)
2017–2018	Jagodina	3	(0)
2020–2022	Red Star Belgrade	0	(0)
2020–2021	→ Budućnost Dobanovci (loan)	15	(0)
2021–2022	→ IMT (loan)	30	(0)
2022–2024	Voždovac	44	(0)
2024–	Trenčín	51	(0)

International career^{‡}
2021–	Serbia U20	1	(0)
2022–	Serbia U21	1	(0)
- * Club domestic league appearances and goals as of 21 September 2026 ‡ National team caps and goals as of 22 November 2022

Andrija Katić (Serbian Cyrillic: Андрија Катић; born 17 February 2002) is a Serbian footballer who plays as a goalkeeper for Trenčín.

== Club career ==
=== Jagodina ===
Born in Kruševac, Katić was a member of the Trstenik PPT academy, formed in the structure of Prva Petoletka industry. Later he moved to the Jagodina's youth system, passing all categories with the club, usually playing with older generation. Katić joined the first squad in second half of the 2017–18 Serbian First League campaign as a third choice, behind Stefan Stojanović and Aleksa Milojević. At the age of 16 years and 57 days, Katić made his professional debut as a goalkeeper replacing Stefan Stojanović in 86th minute of the match against Sloboda Užice on 15 April 2018. In the next fixture match, against Temnić, Katić also joined the game in second half. Finally, Katić played full-time match against ČSK Čelarevo in the last fixture match of the 2017–18 campaign on 31 May 2018.

== Career statistics ==
As of 1 June 2022

Appearances and goals by club, season and competition
Club	Season	League			Cup		Continental		Other		Total	
Club	Season	Division	Apps	Goals	Apps	Goals	Apps	Goals	Apps	Goals	Apps	Goals
Jagodina	2017–18	Serbian First League	3	0	0	0	—		—		3	0
Budućnost Dobanovci (loan)	2020–21	Serbian First League	15	0	0	0	—		—		15	0
IMT (loan)	2020–21	Serbian First League	15	0	1	0	—		—		16	0
IMT (loan)	2021–22	Serbian First League	15	0	0	0	—		—		15	0
IMT (loan)	IMT Total		30	0	1	0	—		—		31	0
Voždovac	2022–23	Serbian SuperLiga	0	0	0	0	—		—		0	0
Total			48	0	1	0	—		—		49	0

== Honours ==
Red Star Belgrade

- Serbian SuperLiga: 2019–20
