= Nikolas Brandis =

Slovak footballer (born 2005)

Personal information
- Date of birth: 6 May 2005 (age 21)
- Place of birth: Púchov, Slovakia
- Height: 1.80 m (5 ft 11 in)
- Position: Left-back

Team information
- Current team: Groningen
- Number: 12

Youth career
- –2024: AS Trenčín

Senior career*
Years	Team	Apps	(Gls)
2024–2026	AS Trenčín	22	(1)
2024–2025	→ MŠK Púchov (loan)	18	(0)
2026–	Groningen	0	(0)

International career^{‡}
2021	Slovakia U17	2	(0)
2022	Slovakia U18	6	(0)
2023	Slovakia U19	1	(2)
2025	Slovakia U20	1	(0)
- * Club domestic league appearances and goals as of 25 May 2026 ‡ National team caps and goals as of 14 February 2026

Nikolas Brandis (born 6 May 2005) is a Slovak footballer who plays as a left-back for Eredivisie club Groningen.

== Early life ==
Brandis was born in Púchov, where he would start playing football at a young age.

== Club career ==
=== AS Trenčín ===
Brandis is a product of the AS Trenčín youth academy. In 2022, he was involved in a car accident shortly after a UEFA Youth League match against Vilnius. He signed his first professional contract with Trenčín in 2023.

==== Loan to MŠK Púchov ====
After being promoted to the A-team of Trenčín, Brandis was loaned out to 2. Liga club MŠK Púchov. He debuted for the side in a Považské derby match against MŠK Považská Bystrica, playing the full 90 minutes of a 1–1 draw. In February 2025, his loan with the club was extended to the rest of the season. Brandis would go on to make a total of 18 appearances for Púchov in the rest of the season.

=== Return to Trenčín ===
Following the 2024/25 season, Brandis returned to AS Trenčín, where he would sign a contract with the club. He made his debut for the side in a 2–0 loss against FK Železiarne Podbrezová, coming on off the bench in the 75th minute for Jakub Holúbek. Brandis played the full 90 minutes of a 2–0 away victory against last league champions Slovan Bratislava. The win was considered a shock result due to Trenčín’s poor form, with Brandis being praised for his performance.

=== Groningen ===
On 23 July 2026, Brandis joined Groningen in the Netherlands on a four-year deal.

== International career ==
Brandis received his first nomination for the Slovakia national under-17 football team ahead of preparation matches against Bosnia. While playing for the under-19 team, he scored a double in a 4–1 win against Sweden.
