= Lukáš Mikulaj =

Slovak footballer (born 2005)

Personal information
- Date of birth: 11 April 2005 (age 21)
- Place of birth: Bánovce nad Bebravou, Slovakia
- Height: 1.90 m (6 ft 3 in)
- Position: Forward

Team information
- Current team: AS Trenčín
- Number: 21

Youth career
- –2015: Bánovce n. Bebravou
- 2015–2023: AS Trenčín

Senior career*
Years	Team	Apps	(Gls)
2023–	AS Trenčín	33	(7)

International career^{‡}
2023–2024	Slovakia U19	3	(0)
2024–	Slovakia U20	1	(0)
- * Club domestic league appearances and goals as of 21 September 2026 ‡ National team caps and goals as of 24 March 2025

Lukáš Mikulaj (born 11 April 2005) is a Slovak professional footballer who plays as a forward for Niké Liga club AS Trenčín.

== Club career ==
Mikulaj joined the youth setup at AS Trenčín in 2015 and made his senior debut for the club during the 2023–24 season in the Niké Liga.

He signed a professional contract with the club on 7 October 2023.

As of October 2025, he has made seventeen appearances for the senior team, scoring three goals.
