= Hugo Pavek =

Slovak footballer (born 2005)

Personal information
- Date of birth: 2 June 2005 (age 21)
- Place of birth: Trenčín, Slovakia
- Height: 1.87 m (6 ft 2 in)
- Position: Right-back

Team information
- Current team: AS Trenčín
- Number: 90

Youth career
- 2009–2021: AS Trenčín
- 2021–2023: SPAL
- 2023–2024: AS Trenčín

Senior career*
Years	Team	Apps	(Gls)
2024–	AS Trenčín	54	(3)

International career^{‡}
2022	Slovakia U17	3	(0)
2022	Slovakia U18	5	(0)
2025–	Slovakia U21	1	(0)
2026–	Slovakia	2	(0)
- * Club domestic league appearances and goals as of 21 September 2026 ‡ National team caps and goals as of 5 June 2026

Hugo Pavek (born 2 June 2005) is a Slovak professional footballer who plays as a right-back for Niké Liga club AS Trenčín and the Slovakia national team.

== Club career ==
Pavek joined the youth setup at AS Trenčín in 2009 and made his senior debut for the club during the 2024–25 season in the Niké Liga.

He signed a professional contract with the club on 26 July 2024, scoring three goals.

As of October 2025, he has made twenty-seven appearances for the senior team.

== Career statistics ==
=== Club ===
Appearances and goals by club, season and competition
Club	Season	League			National cup		Other		Total	
Club	Season	Division	Apps	Goals	Apps	Goals	Apps	Goals	Apps	Goals
AS Trenčín	2024–25	Slovak First Football League	20	2	4	0	—		24	2
AS Trenčín	2025–26	Slovak First Football League	26	1	4	1	—		30	1
Career total			46	3	8	1	0	0	54	3

=== International ===
As of match played 5 June 2026

Appearances and goals by national team and year
National team	Year	Apps	Goals
Slovakia	2026	2	0
Total		2	0
