= Loïc Bessilé =

Togolese footballer (born 1999)

Personal information
- Date of birth: 19 February 1999 (age 27)
- Place of birth: Toulouse, France
- Height: 1.82 m (6 ft 0 in)
- Position: Defender

Team information
- Current team: Trenčín
- Number: 29

Youth career
- 2005–2006: Pradettes
- 2006–2009: Toulouse Fontaines
- 2009–2016: Toulouse

Senior career*
Years	Team	Apps	(Gls)
2016–2019	Toulouse II	73	(1)
2019–2021	Bordeaux II	20	(0)
2021	Bordeaux	1	(0)
2021–2024	Charleroi	33	(3)
2023–2024	Zébra Élites	3	(0)
2023	→ Eupen (loan)	8	(0)
2024	Dunkerque	5	(0)
2025–	Trenčín	38	(1)

International career^{‡}
2015	France U16	8	(1)
2015–2016	France U17	3	(0)
2016–2017	France U18	5	(0)
2020–	Togo	14	(0)
- * Club domestic league appearances and goals as of 21 September 2026 ‡ National team caps and goals as of 26 March 2024

Loïc Bessilé (born 19 February 1999) is a professional footballer who plays as a defender for Slovak club Trenčín. Born in France, he represents Togo at international level.

== Club career ==
On 8 July 2020, Bessilé signed his first professional contract with Bordeaux.

On 31 August 2021, he moved to Charleroi in Belgium.

On 31 January 2023, Bessilé was loaned by Eupen until the end of the season.

On 23 December 2023, he signed with Ligue 2 club Dunkerque until 2025.

On 10 January 2025, Bessilé signed a two-year contract with Trenčín in Slovakia.

== International career ==
Bessilé was born in France to a Cameroonian father and Togolese mother. He is a youth international for France. He debuted for the Togo national team in a friendly 1–1 tie with Sudan on 12 October 2020.
