= Luka Damjanović =

Bosnian footballer (born 2003)

Personal information
- Date of birth: 10 September 2003 (age 23)
- Place of birth: Banja Luka, Bosnia and Herzegovina
- Height: 1.98 m (6 ft 6 in)
- Position: Goalkeeper

Team information
- Current team: AS Trenčín
- Number: 83

Youth career
- 2019–2022: Borac Banja Luka

Senior career*
Years	Team	Apps	(Gls)
2022–2023	FK Krupa	34	(0)
2023–2024	FK Zvijezda 09	17	(0)
2024–2025	→ AS Trenčín (loan)	0	(0)
2025–2026	AS Trenčín	0	(0)
- * Club domestic league appearances and goals

Luka Damjanović (born 10 September 2003) is a Bosnian former professional footballer who played as a goalkeeper.

Damjanović joined Borac's youth academy in 2019. He later left to play for FK Krupa and FK Zvijezda 09, winning the Republika Srpska Cup with the latter team. He signed for Trenčín in July 2024 on a loan deal, permanently joining the club the following season. Following serious injuries which led to him not playing a match in the Slovak league, it was announced that Damjanović would end his professional career.

Throughout his career, Damjanović represented the U15, U17, U19 and U21 youth sectors of Bosnia and Herzegovina.

== Club career ==
=== Early career in Bosnia ===
Damjanović is a product of the youth academy of Borac Banja Luka. Following good performances, he trained with the A-team and was called up for the Bosnian youth national team. He first entered men's football at the age of eighteen, when he transferred to FK Krupa in the summer of 2022. He conceded 23 goals in 34 games in the Krupa goal, and manage to keep a clean sheet in 16 matches. From there, he transferred to Zvijezd 09, signing a two-year contract with an option for another year. Damjanović helped the club win the Republika Srpska Cup in his first season, saving a shot in the penalty shoot-out against FK Sloga Doboj. While winning the trophy, Zvijezd 09 was relegated to the second division.

=== AS Trenčín ===
On 1 August 2024, it was announced that Damjanović would be joining Slovak club AS Trenčín on a one-year loan with an option to join permanently. Despite not playing a single game in the league, he joined the club permanently the next season. The twenty-two-year-old goalkeeper had a serious injury before the start of the season and after a series of examinations and surgery, it was announced that he would be ending his professional career.

== International career ==
In 2024, Damjanović was called up to represent the Bosnia and Herzegovina national under-21 football team ahead of a European Under-21 Championship qualifying match against Cyprus.
