= Eynel Soares =

Cape Verdean footballer

Personal information
- Full name: Eynel Domingos Lima Soares
- Date of birth: 25 October 1998 (age 28)
- Place of birth: Santiago, Cape Verde
- Height: 1.73 m (5 ft 8 in)
- Position: Left winger

Team information
- Current team: AS Trenčín (on loan from LNZ Cherkasy)
- Number: 7

Youth career
- –2018: Novara
- 2018–2021: Braga

Senior career*
Years	Team	Apps	(Gls)
2018	Braga B	4	(0)
2022–2024	AS Trenčín	64	(9)
2024–	LNZ Cherkasy	35	(3)
2026–	AS Trenčín (loan)	22	(9)

International career
2019	Cape Verde U20	1	(0)
- * Club domestic league appearances and goals as of 21 September 2026

Eynel Domingos Lima Soares (born 25 October 1998) is a Cape Verdean footballer who plays for Slovak club AS Trenčín, on loan from Ukrainian side LNZ Cherkasy.

== Club career ==
On 12 August 2018, Soares made his professional debut with Braga B in a 2018–19 LigaPro match against Paços Ferreira.

In 2026, he returned to AS Trenčín.
