= Lukáš Fabiš =

Slovak footballer (born 1998)

Personal information
- Date of birth: 5 May 1998 (age 28)
- Place of birth: Nitra, Slovakia
- Height: 1.85 m (6 ft 1 in)
- Position: Right-back

Team information
- Current team: Spartak Trnava
- Number: 21

Youth career
- 2006–2017: Nitra

Senior career*
Years	Team	Apps	(Gls)
2014–2020	Nitra B	53	(5)
2017–2021	Nitra	56	(1)
2021–2023	Ružomberok	62	(1)
2023–2025	Vysočina Jihlava	62	(2)
2025	FC Košice	8	(0)
2026	Skalica	4	(0)
2026–	Spartak Trnava	3	(0)

International career^{‡}
2019–2020	Slovakia U21	6	(0)
- * Club domestic league appearances and goals as of 21 November 2026 ‡ National team caps and goals as of 17 November 2020

Lukáš Fabiš (born 5 May 1998) is a Slovak footballer who plays for Spartak Trnava as a defender.

== Club career ==
=== FC Nitra ===
Fabiš made his Fortuna Liga debut for Nitra against Senica on 18 November 2017. Fabiš played 90 minutes of the goal-less game.

== Honours ==
Individual

- Slovak Super Liga Player of the Month: December 2021
- Slovak Super Liga Team of the Season: 2021–22
