= Adam Yakubu =

Nigerian footballer (born 2005)

Personal information
- Full name: Mustapha Adams Yakubu
- Date of birth: 1 February 2005 (age 21)
- Place of birth: Jos, Nigeria
- Height: 1.85 m (6 ft 1 in)
- Position: Midfielder

Team information
- Current team: LNZ Cherkasy
- Number: 8

Youth career
- –2020: Adamawa United

Senior career*
Years	Team	Apps	(Gls)
2019–2021	Adamawa United	22	(2)
2021–2022	Akwa United	32	(3)
2022–2024	Plateau United	44	(3)
2024–2026	AS Trenčín	28	(0)
2026–	LNZ Cherkasy	4	(0)
- * Club domestic league appearances and goals as of 3 June 2026

Mustapha Adams Yakubu (born 1 February 2005), commonly known as Adam Yakubu, is a Nigerian footballer who plays as a midfielder for Ukrainian Premier League club LNZ Cherkasy.

== Club career ==
=== Early career ===
Yakubu experienced accelerated physical development at a young age, allowing him to compete with older players by the age of 14 years with a height of 6ft. By the age of 16, he had secured a place in the main team of the second division side Adamawa United. While playing for Plateau United, Yakubu scored the winning goal in the 87th minute of a game against Rivers United, securing a 3–2 win after his team went down to 10 men earlier in the game. He won the Plateau United Player of the month award for the month of April following his performances.

=== Trenčín ===
In July 2024, Yakubu joined Slovak club AS Trenčín following good performances with Plateau United. He made his debut for Trenčín in a 6–1 league defeat to FK Dukla Banská Bystrica, coming on off the bench in the 65th minute for Rahim Ibrahim. His first start came in a 1–1 draw against Slovan Bratislava, playing the full game. Before the 2025 winter transfer window, it was rumored that Leicester City had an interest in signing Yakubu after his good performances for Trenčín. It was also rumored that other EFL Championship sides were interested in him. Altogether, he would make 33 appearances in all competitions for Trenčín.

=== LNZ Cherkasy ===
On 1 January 2026, it was announced that Yakubu would be leaving Slovakia to join Ukrainian Premier League club LNZ Cherkasy.

== Honours ==
Akwa United

- Nigeria Premier Football League: 2020–21

LNZ Cherkasy

- Ukrainian Premier League runner-up: 2025–26
