= Séverin Tatolna =

Central African football player (born 1981)

Personal information
- Date of birth: 10 January 2002 (age 24)
- Place of birth: Markounda, Central African Republic
- Height: 1.85 m (6 ft 1 in)
- Position: Defender

Team information
- Current team: FC Livyi Bereh Kyiv
- Number: 14

Youth career
- –2016: Vilhelmina IK
- 2018–2019: Skellefteå FF

Senior career*
Years	Team	Apps	(Gls)
2016–2018	Vilhelmina IK	13	(12)
2019	Sunnanå SK	16	(11)
2020	Skellefteå FF	7	(0)
2020–2021	→ Sunnanå SK (loan)	23	(7)
2021–2022	Skellefteå FF	46	(2)
2023–2024	Umeå FC	31	(1)
2024	Umeå FC ll	3	(0)
2024	FBK Karlstad	7	(0)
2025	Humenné	12	(3)
2025–26	Podbrezova	7	(0)
2026	→ Tatran Prešov (loan)	10	(0)
2026 -	FC Livyi Bereh Kyiv	3	(0)

International career^{‡}
2023–	Central African Republic	10	(0)
- * Club domestic league appearances and goals as of 25 May 2026 ‡ National team caps and goals as of 17:38 (UTC) 10 November 2024

Séverin Tatolna (born 10 January 2002) is a Central African professional footballer who plays for Tatran Prešov on loan from Podbrezova and the Central African Republic national football team.

== Early life ==
Tatolna moved with his family as an 11-year-old to Vilhelmina in Sweden.

== Club career ==
Tatolna begin to play with Vilhelmina IK when he was around 12 years-old. Tatolna played his first match in Swedish Division 6 (The 8 Tier) with Vilhelmina IK, when he only was 14 years-old. When he was 15 years-old he moved to Skellefteå to and take a place in the Skellefteå FF football academy and attend their football high school. In December 2021, he signed a new contract with Skellefteå. He signed for Umeå FC from Skellefteå in January 2023, agreeing a two-year contract. He scored his first goal for Umeå in July 2023 against Stockholm Inter. In August 2024, Tatolna was signed by FBK Karlstad, where he signed a contract that expires after the season.

== Style of play ==
A left footed player, he predominantly plays as a left-back.

== International career ==
An international for the Central African Republic national football team, he was called up to the national team for the first time in the autumn 2021. In September 2023, he played in Africa Cup of Nations qualifying against Ghana. In November 2023, he started a World Cup Qualifying match away against Mali which finished in a 1–1 draw.
