= Kristo Hussar =

Estonian footballer (born 2002)

Personal information
- Full name: Kristo Hussar
- Date of birth: 28 June 2002 (age 24)
- Place of birth: Tallinn, Estonia
- Position: Right-back

Team information
- Current team: Trenčín
- Number: 17

Youth career
- –2018: JK Tabasalu
- 2018–2020: Flora

Senior career*
Years	Team	Apps	(Gls)
2019	JK Tabasalu	32	(4)
2020–2023	Flora U21	31	(4)
2020–2025	Flora	127	(3)
2026-	Trenčín	2	(0)

International career^{‡}
2017	Estonia U16	1	(0)
2018	Estonia U17	9	(1)
2019–2020	Estonia U19	11	(0)
2021–2023	Estonia U21	21	(0)
2024–	Estonia	8	(0)
- * Club domestic league appearances and goals as of 14 March 2026 ‡ National team caps and goals as of 2 December 2025

Kristo Hussar (born 28 June 2002) is an Estonian professional footballer who currently plays as a right back for Slovak First Football League club Trenčín and the Estonia national team.

== Club career ==
Hussar started his career in the Esiliiga B club JK Tabasalu before joining Meistriliiga side Flora. He has since won 3 Meistriliiga titles, 1 Estonian Cup title and 2 Estonian Super Cup titles.

Hussar debuted in Meistriliiga in 2020 and was also part of the Flora team in the Conference League group stage.

== International career ==
Hussar made his senior international debut for Estonia on 12 January 2024, in a 1–2 loss to Sweden in a friendly.

== Honours ==
Flora

- Meistriliiga: 2020, 2022, 2023
- Estonian Cup: 2019–20
- Estonian Super Cup: 2024
