= Adrián Fiala =

Slovak footballer (born 2005)

Personal information
- Date of birth: 2 May 2005 (age 21)
- Place of birth: Nové Zámky, Slovakia
- Height: 1.77 m (5 ft 10 in)
- Positions: Midfielder; left winger

Team information
- Current team: Slovácko (on loan from AS Trenčín)

Youth career
- –2013: Palárikovo
- 2013–2015: Šaľa
- 2015–2020: FC Nitra
- 2020–2024: AS Trenčín

Senior career*
Years	Team	Apps	(Gls)
2024–	AS Trenčín	30	(1)
2026–	→ Slovácko (loan)	3	(0)
2026–	→ Slovácko B (loan)	6	(2)

International career^{‡}
2022	Slovakia U17	3	(0)
2022	Slovakia U18	4	(0)
2024	Slovakia U20	1	(0)
2025–	Slovakia U21	2	(0)
- * Club domestic league appearances and goals as of 25 May 2026 ‡ National team caps and goals as of 9 September 2025

Adrián Fiala (born 2 May 2005) is a Slovak professional footballer who plays as a midfielder for Czech First League club Slovácko on loan from AS Trenčín.

== Club career ==
Fiala joined the youth setup at AS Trenčín in 2020 and made his senior debut for the club during the 2024–25 season in the Niké Liga in a 3–0 loss against FC DAC 1904 Dunajská Streda, playing 17 minutes of the game.

He signed a professional contract with the club on 9 February 2024.

On 10 February 2026, Fiala joined Czech First League club Slovácko on a loan deal with an option to buy.

== International career ==
Fiala scored two goals for the Slovakia national under-21 football team against the Kazakhstan U21 team.
