= Molik Khan =

Trinidadian footballer

Personal information
- Full name: Molik Jesse Khan
- Date of birth: 8 April 2004 (age 22)
- Place of birth: San Fernando, Trinidad and Tobago
- Height: 1.83 m (6 ft 0 in)
- Position: Midfielder

Team information
- Current team: Vanspor
- Number: 8

Youth career
- 2014–2019: W Connection

Senior career*
Years	Team	Apps	(Gls)
2019–2020	W Connection	15	(1)
2020–2022	Club Sando	0	(0)
2022–2024	Minnesota United 2	40	(5)
2024	Minnesota United	0	(0)
2024	→ HB Køge (loan)	9	(0)
2025–2026	AS Trenčín	19	(4)
2026–	Vanspor	9	(0)

International career^{‡}
2018	Trinidad and Tobago U15	10	(4)
2019	Trinidad and Tobago U17		
2021	Trinidad and Tobago U20	4	(2)
2021–	Trinidad and Tobago	6	(0)
- * Club domestic league appearances and goals as of 7 November 2026 ‡ National team caps and goals as of 22:53, 25 January 2019 (UTC)

Molik Jesse Khan (born 8 April 2004) is a Trinidadian professional footballer who plays as a midfielder for Turkish TFF 1. Lig club Vanspor and the Trinidad and Tobago national team.

== Early life and education ==
Khan played for Naparima College at high school, where he won the Trinidad and Tobago National High School Championships for three consecutive years. Khan and Naparima College finished seasons unbeaten, breaking long-standing records in the Trinidad and Tobago youth football circuit.

Khan then enrolled at 13-time national soccer champions St Benedict's Preparatory school in Newark, New Jersey the former high school of American soccer legends Claudio Reyna, Gregg Berhalter and Tab Ramos. In his only season at St Benedict's, Khan led the team to an unbeaten New Jersey State Championship making him a high school champion in a second country.

== Club career ==
Khan made his professional debut for W Connection at age 15, becoming one of the youngest professional footballers in the history of TT Pro League. A few weeks after his professional debut Khan scored in the TT Pro League, becoming one of the league's youngest-ever goal scorers. In April 2021, Khan was offered a two-week trial at Major League Soccer's New York Red Bulls and stayed with the club for four months.

On the eve of his 18th birthday, Khan signed a multi-year contract with Minnesota United in Major League Soccer and will play primarily with their MLS Next Pro team, Minnesota United FC 2.

In August 2024, the midfielder was loaned to Danish club HB Køge.

During the 2025 Winter transfer window, Khan was transferred to Slovak First Football League team AS Trenčín. He made his debut for the club in a 2–1 loss against Železiarne Podbrezová, coming on as a substitute in the 86' minute. Khan scored his first goal for Trenčín in a 3–2 loss against Zemplin Michalovce, scoring 14 minutes after being subbed on. He would receive his first start in a 1–0 win over FC Košice, scoring the only goal of the game.

== International career ==
Khan has represented Trinidad and Tobago at the youth level. Because of Khan's efforts in the TT Pro League he was called up by new national team head coach and ex-England international, Terry Fenwick, for his first senior team camp. At 16, Khan was the youngest player selected.

Following Trinidad and Tobago's elimination from the 2022 World Cup, interim coach, Angus Eve, named 17-year-old Khan as the youngest member of their 26-man squad for the 2021 Gold Cup qualifiers in Miami, Florida. Eve, who is Trinidad and Tobago's most capped player, has described Khan as "the future of Trinidad and Tobago football". On 21 January 2022, aged just 17 years old, Khan made his senior international debut for Trinidad and Tobago against Bolivia during an international friendly in Sucre, Bolivia. Khan entered the game at the start of the second half.

18-year-old Khan was then selected as part of Trinidad and Tobago's 26-man Concacaf Nations League squad to play games against Nicaragua, St Vincent and the Grenadines and the Bahamas during the June 2022 FIFA international window.

At the 2022 CONCACAF U20 Championships in Honduras, Khan was named captain of the Trinidad and Tobago U20 team and was the only professional player on the team's roster. Khan played the full 90 minutes in all four of the teams' games scoring twice against Suriname and Costa Rica.

In January 2023, the Trinidad and Tobago Football Association named Khan as its Best Player of the Year -Youth Male.

Khan was selected for Trinidad and Tobago's 2023 CONCACAF Gold Cup final squad. He made his tournament debut by coming on the 76th minute against Jamaica.
