= AS Trenčín =

Slovak sports club

Trenčín
- Full name: Asociácia Športov Trenčín a.s.
- Founded: 1992; 34 years ago (as TJ Ozeta Dukla Trenčín)
- Ground: Štadión Sihoť, Trenčín
- Capacity: 6,366
- Owner: Tschen La Ling
- Chairman: Róbert Rybníček
- Head coach: Marek Ďanovský
- League: Slovak First Football League
- 2025–26: Slovak First Football League, 8th of 12
- Website: www.astrencin.sk
Home colours	Away colours

AS Trenčín (Slovak pronunciation: [ˈaː ˈes ˈtrentʂiːn]) is a Slovak sports club in the town of Trenčín, most known for its football department. The football team currently plays in the Slovak First Football League, since they were the champions of the 2010–11 Slovak First League. The club plays its home games at the Štadión na Sihoti with a capacity of 10,000 spectators. They are two-time champions of the Slovak First Football League.

== History ==
The football team was established in 1990 as TJ Ozeta Dukla Trenčín and started in the third division of the Czechoslovak competition, finishing one place below TTS Trenčín. Afterwards both clubs merged. Later, the club spent three seasons (1994–97) in the second division in Slovakia.

In 2002 the club changed its name to FK Laugaricio Trenčín, and one year later became FK AS Trenčín (Araver a Synot Trenčín).

The club's biggest success so far was winning the national title in the 2014–15 season and reaching second place in the 2013–14 season. Trenčín has also made four appearances in the Intertoto Cup (1998, 1999, 2000 and 2002). It is owned by former Dutch international Tschen La Ling. After 11 seasons in the top level the club was relegated after the 2007–08 season.

AS logo between 2003 and 2020

In July 2015, FK AS Trenčín together with women's handball team HK Štart Trenčín was merged into Asociácia športov Trenčín.

=== Events timeline ===
- 1992: Founded as TJ Ozeta Dukla Trenčín
- 1995: Renamed FK Ozeta Dukla Trenčín
- 2002: Renamed Laugaricio Trenčín
- 2003: Renamed FK AS Trenčín (Araver a Synot Trenčín)
- 2015: Renamed AS Trenčín (Asociácia športov Trenčín)

== Honours ==
=== Domestic ===
Czechoslovakia

- Czechoslovak First League (1925–93)
  - Runners-up (1): 1962–63 ^{1}
  - Third place (1): 1967–68 ^{1}

Slovakia

- Slovak League (1993–present)
  - Winners (2): 2014–15, 2015–16
  - Runners-up (1): 2013–14
- Slovak Cup (1961–present)
  - Winners (3): 1978^{1}, 2014–15, 2015–16
- Slovak Second Division (1993–present)
  - Winners (1): 2010–11

=== European ===
- Mitropa Cup
  - Runners-up (1): 1966

== Affiliated clubs ==
The following clubs are affiliated with AS Trenčín:

- (Netherlands) TONEGIDO (2007–08)
- (Slovakia) Baník Horná Nitra (2011–present)
- (Slovakia) Slovan Nemšová (2012–present)
- (Netherlands) Ajax (2012–present)
- (Netherlands) AGOVV Apeldoorn (2012–13)
- (Nigeria) GBS Academy (2014–2019)
- (Slovakia) FK Inter Bratislava (2016–present)

== Supporters ==
The club has a fairly large support in the country and have an active ultras group. They have a fierce rivalry with Spartak Trnava and Slovan Bratislava. The club is one of the very few in the region with politically left-wing fans. Trenčín supporters maintain friendly relations with some fans of Czech Bohemians 1905.

== Sponsorship ==
Period	Kit manufacturer	Shirt sponsor
????–97	ATAK Sportswear	Ozeta
1998–99	Kappa	Ozeta
1999–02	Adidas	Ozeta
2003–05	Adidas	none
2005–06	Umbro	SYNOT
2006–08	Umbro	none
2008–09	Umbro	FITSHAPE
2009–10	Royal	FITSHAPE
2010–12	Royal	KROON
2012–14	Nike	AEGON
2015–2017	Adidas	AEGON
2017	Adidas	EDART
2018	Adidas	MAGIC club
2018–2020	Adidas	ORION TIP
2021	Macron	ORION TIP
2021–2025	Macron	Tipsport
2026	Macron	Trenčín 2026
2026-	Macron	Tipsport

=== Club partners ===
- van Styn
- FITSHAPE
- City of Trenčín
- RS Technology
- Noba
- Zlatý Bažant
- Mattoni 1873
- St. Nicolaus

== Current squad ==
As of 18 September 2026

Note: Flags indicate national team as defined under FIFA eligibility rules; some limited exceptions apply. Players may hold more than one non-FIFA nationality.

No.	Pos.	Nation	Player
1	GK	SRB	Andrija Katić
2	DF	SRB	Nikola Jovanović
4	DF	MLI	Issa Traoré (on loan from (Germany) Bayer 04 Leverkusen)
5	MF	SVK	Fedor Kasana
7	MF	CPV	Eynel Soares (on loan from (Ukraine) LNZ Cherkasy)
8	MF	SVK	Tadeáš Hájovský
9	FW	NED	Jordan Zirkzee
10	FW	BFA	Dylann Kam
13	DF	ISR	Jonathan Mulder (on loan from 1. FC Slovácko)
14	FW	NGR	Ridwan Sanusi (on loan from MŠK Žilina)
16	MF	GHA	Clement Ansah
17	DF	EST	Kristo Hussar
18	MF	EST	Markus Poom
19	MF	GEO	Gia Nadareishvili
21	FW	SVK	Lukáš Mikulaj

No.	Pos.	Nation	Player
22	MF	EST	Dimitri Jepihhin
23	DF	CRO	Viktor Šimić
25	DF	SVK	Lukáš Skovajsa
26	DF	SVK	Jaroslav Holp
29	DF	TOG	Loïc Bessilé
30	GK	SVK	Matúš Sláviček
31	MF	NED	Jenno Campagne
33	DF	SVK	Richard Križan
40	FW	NGR	Mohammed Garba
70	FW	BIH	Franko Sabljić
77	MF	SVK	Jakub Paur
90	DF	SVK	Hugo Pavek
93	MF	ESP	Pablo González
95	DF	SEN	Papa Diouf
99	FW	DEN	Mikkel Boye

For recent transfers, see List of Slovak football transfers summer 2026

=== Out on loan ===
Note: Flags indicate national team as defined under FIFA eligibility rules; some limited exceptions apply. Players may hold more than one non-FIFA nationality.

No. / Pos. / Nation / Player; 6 / MF / CRO / Antonio Baždarić (at FC Eindhoven until 30 June 2027)	No. / Pos. / Nation / Player; 28 / MF / KAZ / Shakhmurza Adyrbekov (at Baník Prievidza until 30 June 2027)

=== Current technical staff ===
As of 26 May 2023

Staff	Job title
(Slovakia) Marek Ďanovský	Head coach
(Slovakia) Karol Karlík	Assistant coach
(Slovakia) Peter Kleščík	B team manager
(Serbia) Miljan Vesić	Goalkeeping coach
(Slovakia) Drahoslav Bočák	Team Manager
(Slovakia) Branislav Haviernik	Scout
(Slovakia) Dr Jozef Takáč	Team Doctor
(Serbia) Duško Korač	Fitness coach
(Slovakia) Peter Gašperák	Physiotherapist
(Slovakia) Jozef Liška	Masseur

== Transfers ==
AS have produced numerous players who have gone on to represent the Slovak national football team. Since 2004, there has been a steady increase of young players leaving Trenčín after a few years of first team football and moving on to play football in leagues of a higher standard, with the Russian Football Premier League (Martin Škrteľ to Zenit in 2004, František Kubík to Kuban in 2011), Belgian Pro League (Moses Simon, Haris Hajradinović (booth 2014), Rabiu Ibrahim (2016), Samuel Kalu (2017), Rangelo Janga (2018), Philip Azango (2018), Reuben Yem (2019) and Osman Bukari (2020) to K.A.A. Gent, Wesley to Club Brugge in 2016, Kingsley Madu and Aliko Bala to Zulte Waregem in 2016,2017 James Lawrence to Anderlecht in 2018), Danish Superliga (Stanislav Lobotka and Ramón to FC Nordsjælland in 2015, Fanendo Adi to Copenhagen in 2013), Dutch Eredivisie (Ryan Koolwijk to SBV Excelsior in 2016, Hilary Gong to SBV Vitesse in 2018), Greece Super League (Jairo to PAOK in 2015), Norway Tippeligaen (Tomáš Malec to Lillestrøm SK in 2016), Czech First League (Aldo Baéz to Slavia Prague in 2014 and season 2015–16 league topscorer Gino van Kessel in 2016). The record transfer was agreed in 2026 when 19-year-old winger Suleman Sani joined German RB Leipzig for a fee of €5-7 million.

=== Record transfers ===
Rank	Player	To	Fee	Year
1.	(Nigeria) Suleman Sani	(Germany) RB Leipzig	€7.0 million*	2026
2.	(Brazil) Wesley	(Belgium) Club Brugge	€4.2 million*	2016
3.	(Slovakia) Matúš Bero	(Turkey) Trabzonspor	€3.5 million*	2016
4.	(Nigeria) Hilary Gong	(Netherlands) SBV Vitesse	€2.0 million*	2018
5.	(Curaçao) Gino van Kessel	(Czech Republic) Slavia Prague	€1.5 million*	2016
6.	(Jamaica) Leon Bailey	(Belgium) Genk	€1.4 million*	2015
6.	(Nigeria) Cody David	(Ukraine) Cherkasy	€1.4 million*	2026
7.	(Croatia) Antonio Mance	(Croatia) NK Osijek	€1.3 million*	2019
8.	(Nigeria) Samuel Kalu	(Belgium) Gent	€1.0 million*	2017
8.	(Ghana) Osman Bukari	(Belgium) Gent	€1.0 million*	2020
8.	(Nigeria) Emmanuel Uchegbu	(United States) Charlotte	€1.0 million	2025
8.	(Nigeria) Adam Yakubu	(Ukraine) Cherkasy	€1.0 million	2026
9.	(Brazil) Jairo	(Greece) PAOK	€0.8 million*	2015
9.	(Nigeria) Moses Simon	(Belgium) Gent	€0.8 million*	2015
10.	(Slovakia) Jakub Kadák	(Switzerland) FC Luzern	€0.75 million*	2022
11.	(Slovakia) Martin Škrteľ	(Russia) Zenit	€0.5 mil.(16 mil.SKK)	2004
11.	(Slovakia) Artur Gajdoš	(Slovakia) Slovan Bratislava	€0.5 million	2024

*-unofficial fee

== Results ==
=== League and Cup history ===
Slovak League only (1993–present)

Season	Division (Name)	Pos./Teams	Pl.	W	D	L	GS	GA	P	Domestic Cup	Europe		Top Scorer (Goals)
1993–94	3rd (3. Liga Západ)	1/(16)	30	21	6	3	62	19	48	3R			
1994–95	2nd (1. Liga)	7/(16)	30	13	5	12	54	40	44	1R			(Slovakia) Róbert Formanko (16)
1995–96	2nd (1. Liga)	9/(16)	30	10	7	13	41	42	37	1R			
1996–97	2nd (1. Liga)	2/(18)	34	24	2	8	68	30	74	1R			
1997–98	1st (Mars Superliga)	4/(16)	30	14	5	9	47	31	53	2R			(Slovakia) Martin Fabuš (16)
1998–99	1st (Mars Superliga)	5/(16)	30	15	8	7	53	25	53	1R	UI	2R ( (Russia) Baltika)	(Slovakia) Martin Fabuš (19)
1999–00	1st (Mars Superliga)	5/(16)	30	13	8	9	38	29	47	2R	UI	1R ( (North Macedonia) Pobeda)	(Slovakia) Jozef Valachovič (7)
2000–01	1st (Mars Superliga)	8/(10)	36	11	6	19	35	59	39	2R	UI	1.R ( (Latvia) Dinaburg)	(Slovakia) Marián Klago (6)
2001–02	1st (Mars Superliga)	5/(10)	36	15	9	12	45	43	54	2R			(Slovakia) Martin Fabuš (9)
2002–03	1st (Superliga)	9/(10)	36	11	5	20	48	69	38	2R	UI	1R ( (Croatia) Slaven Belupo)	(Slovakia) Milan Ivana (10)
2003–04	1st (Corgoň Liga)	5/(10)	36	13	9	14	37	43	48	1R			(Slovakia) Stanislav Velický (7)
2004–05	1st (Corgoň Liga)	8/(10)	36	12	7	17	36	50	43	2R			(Slovakia) Ivan Lietava (9)
2005–06	1st (Corgoň Liga)	7/(10)	36	11	9	16	31	49	42	Quarter-finals			(Slovakia) Jaroslav Kamenský (6)
2006–07	1st (Corgoň Liga)	11/(12)	36	8	11	17	31	49	35	2R			(Slovakia) Juraj Czinege (4)
2007–08	1st (Corgoň Liga)	12/(12)	33	3	7	23	26	77	16	3R			(Argentina) (Slovakia) David Depetris (4)
2008–09	2nd (1. liga)	2/(12)	33	19	9	5	74	27	66	1R			(Argentina) (Slovakia) David Depetris (21)
2009–10	2nd (1. liga)	2/(12)	27	13	11	3	53	21	50	3R			(Slovakia) Filip Hlohovský (7) (Paraguay) Jorge Salinas (7)
2010–11	2nd (1. liga)	1/(12)	33	22	6	5	77	30	72	3R			(Argentina) (Slovakia) David Depetris (31)
2011–12	1st (Corgoň Liga)	5/(12)	33	12	12	9	51	49	48	3R			(Trinidad and Tobago) Lester Peltier (11)
2012–13	1st (Corgoň Liga)	3/(12)	33	14	11	8	52	34	18	3R			(Argentina) (Slovakia) David Depetris (16)
2013–14	1st (Corgoň Liga)	2/(12)	33	19	6	8	74	35	63	2R	EL	Q3 ( (Romania) Astra)	(Slovakia) Tomáš Malec (14)
2014–15	1st (Fortuna Liga)	1/(12)	33	23	5	5	67	28	74	Winner	EL	Q3 ( (England) Hull City)	(Brazil) Jairo (8)
2015–16	1st (Fortuna Liga)	1/(12)	33	26	3	4	73	28	81	Winner	CL	Q2 ( (Romania) Steaua București)	(Curaçao) Gino van Kessel (17)
2016–17	1st (Fortuna Liga)	4/(12)	30	14	5	11	53	48	47	Quarter-finals	CL; EL	Q3 ( (Poland) Legia Warsaw); PO ( (Austria) Rapid Wien)	(Curaçao) Rangelo Janga (14)
2017–18	1st (Fortuna Liga)	5/(12)	31	14	6	11	73	47	48	4R	EL	Q2 ( (Israel) Bnei Yehuda)	(Curaçao) Rangelo Janga (14)
2018–19	1st (Fortuna Liga)	11/(12)	32	8	7	17	41	56	31	6R	EL	PO ( (Cyprus) AEK Larnaca)	(Bosnia and Herzegovina) Hamza Čataković (12)
2019–20	1st (Fortuna Liga)	7/(12)	27	11	6	10	52	43	39	Quarter-finals			(Ghana) Osman Bukari (10)
2020–21	1st (Fortuna Liga)	6/(12)	32	8	8	16	42	61	32	Quarter-finals			(Bosnia and Herzegovina) Hamza Čataković (12)
2021–22	1st (Fortuna Liga)	7/(12)	32	13	9	10	58	43	48	Semi-finals			(Slovakia) Jakub Kadák (13)
2022–23	1st (Fortuna Liga)	9/(12)	32	9	9	14	35	52	36	Semi-finals			(Slovakia) Artur Gajdoš (6) (Serbia) Filip Bainović (6)
2023–24	1st (Niké Liga)	8/(12)	32	13	10	9	48	34	49	4R			(Serbia) Njegoš Kupusović (10)
2024–25	1st (Niké Liga)	11/(12)	32	7	14	11	37	48	35	Round of 16			(Nigeria) Emmanuel Uchegbu (4)
2025–26	1st (Niké Liga)	8/(12)	32	13	3	16	34	51	42	Quarter-finals			(Nigeria) Cody David (9)

=== European record ===
^{Until 1992 played as Jednota Trenčín}

Season	Competition	Round	Club	Home	Away	Aggregate
1966	Mitropa Cup					
1966	Mitropa Cup	1. Round	(Austria) Admira Wien	4–0	1–2	5–2
1966	Mitropa Cup	1/4 Final	(Socialist Federal Republic of Yugoslavia) Red Star Belgrade	3–1	1–0	4–1
1966	Mitropa Cup	Semi-final	(Hungary) Vasas	1–0		
1966	Mitropa Cup	Final	(Italy) Fiorentina		0–1	
1967–68	Mitropa Cup	1 .Round	(Socialist Federal Republic of Yugoslavia) Željezničar	0–1	0–0	0–1
1998	Intertoto Cup	1. Round	(Latvia) Dinaburg	1–1	4–1	5–1
1998	Intertoto Cup	2. Round	(Russia) Baltika	0–1	0–0	0–1
1999	Intertoto Cup	1. Round	(North Macedonia) Pobeda	3–1	1–3	4–4 (p)
2000	Intertoto Cup	1. Round	(Latvia) Dinaburg	0–3	0–1	0–4
2002	Intertoto Cup	1. Round	(Croatia) Slaven Belupo	3–1	0–5	3–6
2013–14	UEFA Europa League	2Q	(Sweden) IFK Göteborg	2–1	0–0	2–1
2013–14	UEFA Europa League	3Q	(Romania) Astra Giurgiu	1–3	2–2	3–5
2014–15	UEFA Europa League	2Q	(Serbia) Vojvodina	4–0	0–3	4–3
2014–15	UEFA Europa League	3Q	(England) Hull City	0–0	1–2	1–2
2015–16	UEFA Champions League	2Q	(Romania) Steaua București	0–2	3–2	3–4
2016–17	UEFA Champions League	2Q	(Slovenia) NK Olimpija	2–3	4–3	6–6
2016–17	UEFA Champions League	3Q	(Poland) Legia Warsaw	0–1	0–0	0–1
2016–17	UEFA Europa League	PO	(Austria) Rapid Wien	0–4	2–0	2–4
2017–18	UEFA Europa League	1Q	(Georgia (country)) Torpedo Kutaisi	5–1	3–0	8–1
2017–18	UEFA Europa League	2Q	(Israel) Bnei Yehuda	1–1	0–2	1–3
2018–19	UEFA Europa League	1Q	(Montenegro) Budućnost Podgorica	1–1	2–0	3–1
2018–19	UEFA Europa League	2Q	(Poland) Górnik Zabrze	4–1	1–0	5–1
2018–19	UEFA Europa League	3Q	(Netherlands) Feyenoord	4–0	1–1	5–1
2018–19	UEFA Europa League	PO	(Cyprus) AEK Larnaca	1–1	0–3	1–4

== Player records ==
=== Most goals ===
#	Nat.	Name	Goals
1	(Argentina) (Slovakia)	David Depetris	88
2	(Czechoslovakia)	Pavol Bencz	72
3	(Czechoslovakia)	Vojtech Masný	65
4	(Slovakia)	Martin Fabuš	59
5	(Bosnia and Herzegovina)	Hamza Čataković	40
6	(Curaçao)	Gino van Kessel	39

Players whose name is listed in bold are still active.

==== Czechoslovak and Slovak Top Goalscorer ====
The Czechoslovak League top scorer from 1944 to 1945 until 1992–93. Since the 1993–94 Slovak League Top scorer.

Year	Winner	G
1964–65	(Czechoslovakia) Pavol Bencz	19
1998–99	(Slovakia) Martin Fabuš	19
2002–03	(Slovakia) Martin Fabuš	20^{1}
2012–13	(Slovakia) David Depetris	16
2013–14	(Slovakia) Tomáš Malec	14
2015–16	(Curaçao) Gino van Kessel	17
2021–22	(Slovakia) Jakub Kadák	13

^{1}Shared award

== Notable players ==
Had international caps for their respective countries. Players whose name is listed in bold represented their countries while playing for AS Trenčín.

- (Nigeria) Fanendo Adi
- (Czechoslovakia) **Milan Albrecht**
- (Slovakia) Juraj Ančic
- (Jamaica) Leon Bailey
- (Czechoslovakia) **Dušan Bartovič**
- (Equatorial Guinea) Carlos Bejarano
- (Czechoslovakia) **Pavol Bencz**
- (Togo) Loïc Bessilé
- (Georgia (country)) **Giorgi Beridze**
- (Slovakia) **Matúš Bero**
- (Czechoslovakia) Ivan Bilský
- (Ghana) **Osman Bukari**
- (Jordan) Angelos Chanti
- (Suriname) **Ivenzo Comvalius**
- (China) Yin Congyao
- (Slovakia) Kamil Čontofalský
- (Slovakia) Juraj Czinege
- (Slovakia) David Depetris
- (Slovakia) Marián Dirnbach
- (Slovakia) Peter Doležaj
- (Slovakia) **Martin Fabuš**
- (Slovakia) Ľubomír Faktor
- (Indonesia) Marselino Ferdinan
- (Nigeria) Reuben Gabriel
- (Slovakia) Artur Gajdoš
- (Slovakia) Roman Gergel
- (Slovakia) Dávid Guba
- (Slovakia) **Tadeáš Hájovský**
- (Bosnia and Herzegovina) Haris Hajradinović
- (Slovakia) **Róbert Hanko**
- (Slovakia) Filip Hlohovský
- (Slovakia) Dominik Hollý
- (Slovakia) Filip Hološko
- (Slovakia) Jakub Holúbek
- (Slovakia) Csaba Horváth
- (Slovakia) Jaroslav Hrabal
- (Estonia) Kristo Hussar
- (Nigeria) **Rabiu Ibrahim**
- (North Macedonia) **Dejan Iliev**
- (Slovakia) Milan Ivana
- (Czechoslovakia) Justín Javorek
- (Curaçao) **Rangelo Janga**
- (Czechoslovakia) Ladislav Józsa
- (Trinidad and Tobago) **Keston Julien**
- (Slovakia) Jozef Juriga
- (Slovakia) Jakub Kadák
- (Nigeria) Samuel Kalu
- (Czechoslovakia) Ján Kapko
- (Democratic Republic of the Congo) Steve Kapuadi
- (Slovakia) Marek Kaščák
- (Trinidad and Tobago) Molik Khan
- (Slovakia) Karol Kisel
- (Slovakia) Matúš Kmeť
- (Slovakia) Rastislav Kostka
- (Slovakia) Samuel Kozlovský
- (Slovakia) František Kubik
- (Slovakia) Dušan Kuciak
- (Slovakia) **Lukáš Kyselica**
- (Bulgaria) (Czechoslovakia) Bozhin Laskov
- (Wales) James Lawrence
- (Slovakia) **Martin Lipčák**
- (Slovakia) Stanislav Lobotka
- (Slovakia) Filip Lukšík
- (Nigeria) **Kingsley Madu**
- (Austria) Stefan Maierhofer
- (Slovakia) Tomáš Malec
- (Czechoslovakia) Marián Masný
- (Czechoslovakia) **Vojtech Masný**
- (Slovakia) Róbert Mazáň
- (Slovakia) Patrik Mišák
- (Czechoslovakia) **Vladimír Mojžiš**
- (Slovakia) Peter Németh
- (Nigeria) Uche Nwofor
- (Slovakia) **Hugo Pavek**
- (Czechoslovakia) Emil Pažický
- (Cape Verde) **Kelvin Pires**
- (Finland) **Juha Pirinen**
- (Slovakia) Juraj Piroska
- (Trinidad and Tobago) **Lester Peltier**
- (Slovakia) Peter Pokorný
- (Slovakia) Andrej Porázik
- (Slovakia) Erik Prekop
- (Paraguay) Jorge Salinas
- (Nigeria) Moses Simon
- (Czechoslovakia) Miroslav Siva
- (Slovakia) Anton Šoltis
- (Slovakia) Martin Škrtel
- (Slovakia) **Ondrej Šmelko**
- (Slovakia) **Samuel Štefánik**
- (Slovakia) Peter Štyvar
- (Slovakia) **Martin Šulek**
- (Czechoslovakia) Anton Švajlen
- (Slovakia) **Jozef Valachovič**
- (Curaçao) **Gino van Kessel**
- (Cape Verde) **Vozinha**
- (Indonesia) **Witan Sulaeman**
- (Brazil) Wesley

== Managers ==
- (Czechoslovakia) Ján Hucko (1975–76)
- (Slovakia) Ladislav Kuna (1995–96)
- (Slovakia) Stanislav Griga (1 Jul 1996 – 30 Jun 1998)
- (Slovakia) Ladislav Borbély (1997–98)
- (Slovakia) Róbert Paldan (1998–00)
- (Russia) Alexander Bokij (2000–01)
- (Slovakia) Milan Albrecht (2001)
- (Slovakia) Anton Dragúň (2001)
- (Slovakia) Róbert Paldan (2002)
- (Slovakia) Anton Dragúň (2002–2003)
- (Slovakia) Jaroslav Jurkovič (2003)
- (Slovakia) Karol Kisel st. (2003–04)
- (Slovakia) Anton Jánoš (2004–05)
- (Slovakia) Karol Marko (2005)
- (Slovakia) Ladislav Hudec (1 Jul 2005 – 11 Mar 2006)
- (Czech Republic) Vlastimil Palička (2006–07)
- (England) Rob McDonald (1 Jul 2007 – 30 Jun 2008)
- (Slovakia) Martin Stano (2008)
- (Slovakia) Ivan Galád (2008–09)
- (Slovakia) Vladimír Koník (1 Jul 2009 – 13 Nov 2009)
- (Slovakia) Adrián Guľa (14 Nov 2009 – 30 Jun 2013)
- (Slovakia) Ľubomír Nosický (1 Jul 2013 – 8 Sep 2013)
- (Slovakia) Martin Ševela (8 Sep 2013 – 12 Sep 2017)
- (Slovakia) Vladimír Cifranič (12 Sep 2017 – 2 Jun 2018)
- (Netherlands) Ricardo Moniz (2 Jun 2018 – 28 Oct 2018)
- (Slovakia) Vladimír Cifranič (28 Oct 2018 – 20 Mar 2019)
- (Germany) Matthias Kohler (20 Mar 2019 – 7 May 2019)
- (Slovakia) Ivan Galád (7 May 2019 – 20 Jun 2019)
- (Germany) Matthias Kohler (20 Jun 2019 – 22 Oct 2019)
- (Slovakia) Norbert Hrnčár (22 Oct 2019 – 30 Jun 2020)
- (Belgium) Stijn Vreven (17 Jul 2020 – 27 Apr 2021)
- (Slovakia) Juraj Ančic (27 Apr 2021 – 2 Jun 2021) (car.)
- (Slovakia) Peter Hlinka (2 June 2021 – 5 Dec 2021)
- (Slovakia) Juraj Ančic (21 Dec 2021 – 6 Jun 2022)
- (Germany) Peter Hyballa (12 Jun 2022 – 27 Jul 2022)
- (Slovakia) Marián Zimen (28 Jul 2022 – 26 Mar 2023)
- (Czech Republic) František Straka (26 Mar 2023 – 22 May 2023)
- (Serbia) Ilija Stolica (26 May 2023 – 10 Oct 2024)
- (Slovakia) Ivan Galád (10 Oct 2024 – 30 Jun 2025)
- (Netherlands) Ricardo Moniz (1 Jul 2025 – 11 Oct 2026)
- (Slovakia) Marek Ďanovský (14 Oct 2026 - )

== Previous kits ==
The first home Ozeta Dukla kit, worn in 1994–95.	The first away Ozeta Dukla kit, worn in 1994–95.	The typical Ozeta Dukla kit, as worn in 1996–03.
The alternative Ozeta Dukla kit, as worn in 1996–03.	The home FK Laugaricio kit and the older FK AS kit, worn in 2003–08.	The away FK Laugaricio kit and the older FK AS kit, worn in 2003–08.
