= 2025–26 FC Košice season =

Košice
2025–26 season
- Manager: Roman Skuhravý (until 2 October 2025); František Straka (from 8 October 2025 to 11 November 2026); Peter Černák (from 12 November 2026)
- Stadium: Košická futbalová aréna
- Slovak First Football League: 7th
- Slovak Cup: Runners-up
- UEFA Conference League: Second qualifying round
- Top goalscorer: League: Roman Čerepkai (10); All: Roman Čerepkai (13)
- Highest home attendance: 10,102 v Neman Grodno (24 July 2025, UEFA Conference League)
- Lowest home attendance: 2,182 v DAC Dunajská Streda (1 October 2025, Slovak First Football League)
- Average home league attendance: 3,745
- Biggest win: 7–1 v Spišské Podhradie (Away, 14 September 2025, Slovak Cup)
- Biggest defeat: 1–4 v Žilina (Away, 4 October 2025, Slovak First Football League); 0–3 v Trenčín (Away, 16 May 2026, Slovak First Football League)
Home colours	Away colours	Third colours

The 2025–26 season was Football Club Košice's 3rd consecutive season in the Slovak First Football League. In addition to the domestic league, Košice participated in the Slovak Cup and the UEFA Conference League.

On 2 October 2025, Košice and manager Roman Skuhravý mutually agreed to terminate his contract following a poor start to the season, with assistants Matej Čobik-Ferčík and Ľubomír Kordanič taking charge on an interim basis. Six days later, on 8 October, František Straka was appointed manager until the end of the season, replacing his compatriot Skuhravý. After five league matches in charge, Straka was dismissed on 11 November as the club remained bottom of the league table. The following day, academy under-19 manager Peter Černák was placed in temporary charge of the first team before being confirmed as permanent manager on 18 December, signing a contract until 31 May 2027.

== Squad ==
As of 10 March 2026

Note: Flags indicate national team as defined under FIFA eligibility rules; some limited exceptions apply. Players may hold more than one non-FIFA nationality.

No.	Pos.	Nation	Player
1	GK	SVK	Dávid Šípoš
2	DF	ESP	Erlantz Palacín
6	MF	SVK	Filip Lichý (on loan from Slovan Bratislava)
7	MF	SVK	Milan Dimun
8	MF	SVK	Dávid Gallovič
9	FW	SVK	Roman Čerepkai
10	MF	CRO	Edin Julardžija
13	MF	SVK	Matej Jakúbek
15	MF	SVK	Miroslav Sovič
17	FW	HUN	Mátyás Kovács (on loan from (Hungary) MTK Budapest)
18	DF	SVK	Tomáš Ďurko
20	DF	SVK	Ján Krivák (Captain)
21	DF	SVK	Daniel Magda

No.	Pos.	Nation	Player
22	GK	SVK	Matúš Kira
23	DF	SVK	Matej Madleňák
24	DF	SVK	Dominik Kružliak
25	MF	SVK	Marek Zsigmund
26	DF	SVK	Sebastian Kóša (on loan from (Spain) Real Zaragoza)
27	MF	CRO	Karlo Miljanić
29	DF	SLE	Osman Kakay
31	DF	AUT	Emilian Metu
32	GK	SVK	Filip Kalanin
47	DF	AUT	Leonardo Lukačević
77	MF	SVK	Milan Rehuš
87	FW	MNE	Vladimir Perišić (on loan from (Czech Republic) SK Slavia Prague)
98	GK	POL	Kevin Dąbrowski

== Transfers ==
=== Summer ===
In: Note: Flags indicate national team as defined under FIFA eligibility rules; some limited exceptions apply. Players may hold more than one non-FIFA nationality.

No.	Pos.	Nation	Player
—	FW	SVK	Adam Goljan (from (Czech Republic) AC Sparta Prague)
—	DF	SVK	Matej Madleňák (from MFK Ružomberok)
—	MF	SVK	Milan Rehuš (from (Germany) TSG 1899 Hoffenheim)
—	MF	SVK	Milan Dimun (from Dunajská Streda)
—	FW	MNE	Vladimir Perišić (on loan from (Czech Republic) SK Slavia Prague)
―	DF	AUT	Emilian Metu (from (Austria) SV Horn)
―	DF	SLE	Osman Kakay (from (Portugal) Boavista)
98	GK	POL	Kevin Dąbrowski (from Free Agent)

Out: Note: Flags indicate national team as defined under FIFA eligibility rules; some limited exceptions apply. Players may hold more than one non-FIFA nationality.

No.	Pos.	Nation	Player
—	MF	SVK	Michal Faško (Released and joined MŠK Žilina)
—	FW	GRE	Giannis Niarchos (loan return to FC DAC 1904 Dunajská Streda)
—	DF	FIN	Kevin Kouassivi-Benissan (loan return to (Finland) HJK)
—	DF	FRA	Nassim Innocenti (to (Czech Republic) FK Jablonec)
5	DF	SVK	Jakub Jakubko (to (Czech Republic) FK Teplice)

=== Winter ===
In: Note: Flags indicate national team as defined under FIFA eligibility rules; some limited exceptions apply. Players may hold more than one non-FIFA nationality.

No.	Pos.	Nation	Player
—	DF	AUT	Leonardo Lukačević (from (Austria) SC Rheindorf Altach)
—	MF	CRO	Edin Julardžija (from (Bosnia and Herzegovina) FK Sarajevo)
—	DF	SVK	Sebastian Kóša (on loan from (Spain) Real Zaragoza)
—	MF	SVK	Filip Lichý (on loan from ŠK Slovan Bratislava)

Out: Note: Flags indicate national team as defined under FIFA eligibility rules; some limited exceptions apply. Players may hold more than one non-FIFA nationality.

No.	Pos.	Nation	Player
—	FW	SVK	Adam Goljan (to MŠK Púchov)
—	DF	SVK	Lukáš Fabiš (to MFK Skalica)
—	FW	USA	Zyen Jones (to KFC Komárno)
—	DF	AUT	Mario Pejazic (to (Germany) Borussia Dortmund B)

== Competitions ==
=== Overview ===
Competition	First match	Last match	Starting round	Final position	Record							
Competition	First match	Last match	Starting round	Final position	Pld	W	D	L	GF	GA	GD	Win %
Slovak First Football League	27 July 2025	16 May 2026	Matchday 1	7th	32	13	4	15	51	55	−4	40.63
Slovak Cup	27 August 2025	1 May 2026	Second round	Runners-up	8	6	1	1	29	11	+18	75.00
UEFA Conference League	24 July 2025	31 July 2025	Second qualifying round	Second qualifying round	2	0	1	1	3	4	−1	0.00
Total					42	19	6	17	83	70	+13	45.24

Source: Competitions

=== Slovak First Football League ===
==== Regular season ====
===== League table =====
Pos	Team	Pld	W	D	L	GF	GA	GD	Pts	Qualification
6	Zemplín Michalovce	22	8	5	9	32	36	−4	29	Qualification for the championship group
7	Ružomberok	22	6	7	9	24	34	−10	25	Qualification for the relegation group
8	Trenčín	22	7	3	12	18	37	−19	24 (Note: Ranked by head-to-head points: Trenčín 6, Košice 0.)	Qualification for the relegation group
9	Košice	22	7	3	12	35	42	−7	24	Qualification for the relegation group
10	Komárno	22	5	7	10	24	34	−10	22	Qualification for the relegation group
11	Tatran Prešov	22	4	9	9	22	35	−13	21	Qualification for the relegation group
12	Skalica	22	3	7	12	20	35	−15	16	Qualification for the relegation group

Source: Niké liga (in Slovak)
Rules for classification: 1) Points; 2) Head-to-head points; 3) Head-to-head goal difference; 4) Head-to-head away goals scored; 5) Play-off.

===== Results summary =====
Overall								Home						Away					
Pld	W	D	L	GF	GA	GD	Pts	W	D	L	GF	GA	GD	W	D	L	GF	GA	GD
22	7	3	12	35	42	−7	24	4	2	5	20	20	0	3	1	7	15	22	−7

Source: Niké liga

===== Results by round =====
Round	1	2	3	4	5	6	7	8	9	10	11	12	13	14	15	16	17	18	19	20	21	22
Ground	A	H	H	A	H	A	H	A	H	A	H	H	A	A	H	A	H	A	H	A	H	A
Result	L	L	L	L	W	L	L	L	D	L	W	L	L	L	L	D	W	W	W	W	D	W
Position	12	12	12	12	10	11	12	12	12	12	12	12	12	12	12	12	12	11	11	11	11	9
Points	0	0	0	0	3	3	3	3	4	4	7	7	7	7	7	8	11	14	17	20	21	24

Source: Worldfootball
A = Away; H = Home; W = Win; D = Draw; L = Loss

===== Matches =====
27 July 2025 1	Podbrezová	3–1	Košice	Podbrezová
17:00 CEST (UTC+2)	Mielke (yellow card) 9'; Havrylenko 41'; Smékal 54' (pen.); Kujabi 81'	Report	Magda (yellow card) 37'; Jakúbek 62'	Stadium: ZELPO Aréna; Attendance: 1,008; Referee: Michal Smolák; Assistant referees: Branislav Hancko, Andrej Hrmo

10 August 2025 3	Košice	0–1	Trenčín	Košice
17:00 CEST (UTC+2)	Magda (yellow card) 90'	Report	Khan 50', (yellow card) 85'; Bessilé (yellow card) 88'	Stadium: Košická futbalová aréna Attendance: 3,288; Referee: Peter Kráľovič; Assistant referees: Milan Štrbo, Pavel Jánošík

23 August 2025 5	Košice	3–1	Ružomberok	Košice
18:00 CEST (UTC+2)	Čerepkai 13'; Krivák (yellow card) 28'; Zsigmund (yellow card) 40'; Kovács 56', 69'; Kakay (yellow card) 67'	Report	Šašinka 30' (pen.); Šulek (yellow card) 39'; Hladík (yellow card) 57'; Mojžiš (yellow card) 63'; Luterán (yellow card) 66'	Stadium: Košická futbalová aréna Attendance: 3,211; Referee: Filip Malárik; Assistant referees: Dušan Štofik, Peter Bednár

31 August 2025 6	Slovan Bratislava	3–2	Košice	Bratislava
17:00 CEST (UTC+2)	Kukharevych 7', 20', 66'	Report	Čerepkai 47'; Jakúbek (yellow card) 57'; Kovács 59'; Jones (yellow card) 74'	Stadium: Tehelné pole Attendance: 6,421; Referee: Erik Gemzický; Assistant referees: Daniel Poláček, Martin Vitko

13 September 2025 7	Košice	2–3	Komárno	Košice
18:00 CEST (UTC+2)	Čerepkai 13' (pen.); Kakay (yellow card) 16'; Zsigmund (yellow card) 38' (yellow-red card) 52'; Jones 45'	Report	Špiriak (yellow card) 12'; Bayemi (yellow card) 27'; Ganbayar 52'; Mashike 78'; Mišovič 87', (yellow card) 87'; Žák (yellow card) 90'	Stadium: Košická futbalová aréna Attendance: 4,395; Referee: Boris Marhefka; Assistant referees: Milan Štrbo, Matej Zemko

20 September 2025 8	Skalica	1–0	Košice	Skalica
18:00 CEST (UTC+2)	Daniel 39'; Pudhorocký (yellow card) 54'	Report	Jakúbek (yellow card) 27'; Krivák (yellow card) 44'; Metu (yellow card) 45'; Gallovič (yellow card) 51'; Rehuš (yellow card) 76'	Stadium: Mestský štadión Skalica; Attendance: 623; Referee: Peter Ziemba; Assistant referees: Dušan Štofik, Peter Čajka

27 September 2025 9	Košice	2–2	Tatran Prešov	Košice
20:30 CEST (UTC+2)	Čerepkai (yellow card) 4', (goal) 53'; Zsigmund (yellow card) 30'; Teplan (yellow card) 44'; Jakúbek 57'; Kakay (yellow card) 62'; Krivák (yellow card) 76'	Report	Begala (yellow card) 30', (goal) 45'; Regáli (yellow card) 60'; Kotula 78'	Stadium: Košická futbalová aréna Attendance: 8,111; Referee: Michal Očenáš; Assistant referees: Adam Jekkel, Tobiáš Pacák

1 October 2025 2	Košice	0–2	DAC Dunajská Streda	Košice
18:00 CEST (UTC+2)		Report	Tuboly (yellow card) 21'; Đukanović 41'; Herc 44'	Stadium: Košická futbalová aréna Attendance: 2,182; Referee: Lukáš Dzivjak; Assistant referees: Daniel Poláček, Tomáš Straka

4 October 2025 10	Žilina	4–1	Košice	Žilina
20:30 CEST (UTC+2)	Iľko 3'; Káčer 6'; Adang 57'; Faško 63' (pen.); Prokop (yellow card) 85'	Report	Kovács 37'; Kružliak (yellow card) 58'; Teplan (yellow card) 70'	Stadium: Štadión pod Dubňom; Attendance: 1,756; Referee: Matej Choreň; Assistant referees: Dušan Štofik, Peter Čajka

19 October 2025 11	Košice	3–2	Zemplín Michalovce	Košice
15:30 CEST (UTC+2)	Jones 68', (yellow card) 74'; Krivák (yellow card) 74'; Gallovič 77'; Miljanić 87'; Kružliak (yellow card) 90'	Report	Bednár (yellow card) 14'; Dzotsenidze 34', (yellow card) 90'; Cottrell 53'	Stadium: Košická futbalová aréna Attendance: 5,076; Referee: Boris Marhefka; Assistant referees: Andrej Hrmo, Pavel Jánošík

25 October 2025 12	Košice	2–4	Podbrezová	Košice
18:00 CEST (UTC+2)	Kružliak 45'; Palacín 73'	Report	Galčík 28', 70'; Šiler 40'; Kováčik 58'; Havrylenko (yellow card) 90+2'	Stadium: Košická futbalová aréna Attendance: 2,234; Referee: Ivan Kružliak; Assistant referees: Branislav Hancko, Matej Zemko

29 October 2025 4	Spartak Trnava	3–1	Košice	Trnava
18:00 CET (UTC+1)	Kudlička 32'; Taiwo 33', (yellow card) 37'; Jureškin (yellow card) 60'; Ďuriš 90'	Report	Perišić 20'; Metu (yellow card) 52'; Gallovič (yellow card) 81'	Stadium: Anton Malatinský Stadium; Attendance: 3,538; Referee: Ivan Kružliak; Assistant referees: Branislav Hancko, Jakub Košecký

1 November 2025 13	DAC Dunajská Streda	3–1	Košice	Dunajská Streda
18:00 CET (UTC+1)	Redzic 31'; Tuboly (yellow card) 45'; Gagua 62'; Ramadan 90'	Report	Perišić (yellow card) 21'; Magda (yellow card) 29' (yellow-red card) 37'; Dimun 42'; Kružliak (yellow card) 63'	Stadium: MOL Aréna; Attendance: 4,085; Referee: Michal Očenáš; Assistant referees: František Ferenc, Dávid Bobko

8 November 2025 14	Trenčín	2–0	Košice	Trenčín
15:30 CET (UTC+1)	Mathurin (yellow card) 40'; Sabljić 45'; Sani 68'; Kranthove (yellow card) 82'; Hájovský (yellow card) 86'	Report	Kovács (yellow card) 31'; Metu (yellow card) 39'; Perišić (yellow card) 54'	Stadium: Štadión Sihoť; Attendance: 940; Referee: Peter Ziemba; Assistant referees: Peter Čajka, Simeon Vass

22 November 2025 15	Košice	1–2	Spartak Trnava	Košice
18:00 CET (UTC+1)	Kružliak (yellow card) 18'; Kovács 46'; Miljanić (yellow card) 68'; Dimun (yellow card) 83'; Zsigmund (yellow card) 90+1'	Report	Sabo (yellow card) 70', (goal) 90+2'; Koštrna (yellow card) 80'; Mikovič 84'; Frelih (yellow card) 90+5'	Stadium: Košická futbalová aréna Attendance: 2,411; Referee: Michal Očenáš; Assistant referees: Adam Jekkel, Tobiáš Pacák

29 November 2025 16	Ružomberok	1–1	Košice	Ružomberok
15:30 CET (UTC+1)	Chrien 25'; Luterán (yellow card) 64'; Köstl (yellow card) 90+3'	Report	Čerepkai 2'; Ďurko (yellow card) 50'	Stadium: Štadión pod Čebraťom; Attendance: 676; Referee: Peter Ziemba; Assistant referees: Mário Roszbeck, Juraj Halíček

6 December 2025 17	Košice	2–0	Slovan Bratislava	Košice
18:00 CET (UTC+1)	Kovács (yellow card) 12'; Madleňák 43'; Rehuš 62'; Sovič (yellow card) 90+5'	Report	Weiss (yellow card) 10'	Stadium: Košická futbalová aréna Attendance: 4,378; Referee: Boris Marhefka; Assistant referees: Branislav Hancko, Tomáš Vorel

14 December 2025 18	Komárno	1–2	Košice	Zlaté Moravce
15:30 CET (UTC+1)	Tamás 49'	Report	Száraz 35' (o.g.); Sovič 88'	Stadium: ViOn Aréna; Attendance: 367; Referee: Erik Gemzický; Assistant referees: Andrej Hrmo, Peter Čajka

7 February 2026 19	Košice	3–1	Skalica	Košice
15:30 CET (UTC+1)	Kovács 10'; Rehuš 34'; Čerepkai 71' (pen.); Perišić (yellow card) 90'	Report	Bariš (yellow card) 56'; Potočný 77' (pen.); Hollý (yellow card) 84' (yellow-red card) 84'	Stadium: Košická futbalová aréna Attendance: 2,847; Referee: Ivan Kružliak; Assistant referees: Branislav Hancko, Ján Pozor

14 February 2026 20	Tatran Prešov	1–4	Košice	Prešov
18:00 CET (UTC+1)	Römling (red card) 9'; Masaryk 42'	Report	Čerepkai 11', 38'; Gallovič 35', (yellow card) 72'; Jakúbek 51'; Kóša (yellow card) 52'; Lichý (yellow card) 74'	Stadium: Futbal Tatran Arena; Attendance: 6,398; Referee: Boris Marhefka; Assistant referees: Peter Bednár, Tomáš Vorel

22 February 2026 21	Košice	2–2	Žilina	Košice
18:00 CET (UTC+1)	Krivák (yellow card) 1'; Perišić 52'; Madleňák 76'	Report	Krivák 3' (o.g.); Pališčák (yellow card) 14'; Hranica 25'; Kaša (yellow card) 72'	Stadium: Košická futbalová aréna Attendance: 2,482; Referee: Lukáš Dzivjak; Assistant referees: Tobiáš Pacák, Peter Čajka

28 February 2026 22	Zemplín Michalovce	0–2	Košice	Michalovce
15:30 CET (UTC+1)	Bahi (yellow card) 74'; Kalemi (yellow card) 90'	Report	Perišić 4'; Kružliak (yellow card) 8'; Rehuš 21'; Kóša (yellow card) 36'	Stadium: Mestský futbalový štadión Attendance: 2,049; Referee: Peter Ziemba; Assistant referees: Andrej Hrmo, Dávid Bobko

==== Relegation group ====
===== League table =====
Pos	Team	Pld	W	D	L	GF	GA	GD	Pts	Qualification or relegation	KOŠ	TRE	SKA	RUŽ	KOM	TAT
7	Košice	32	13	4	15	51	55	−4	43		—	2–0	2–0	3–1	2–1	2–1
8	Trenčín	32	13	3	16	34	51	−17	42		3–0	—	2–1	3–1	1–2	1–0
9	Skalica	32	9	8	15	34	45	−11	35		3–1	4–1	—	1–0	2–1	1–0
10	Ružomberok	32	8	11	13	34	50	−16	35		1–1	4–3	0–0	—	2–1	1–1
11	Komárno (O)	32	8	8	16	34	46	−12	32	Qualification for the relegation play-offs	1–2	0–1	0–2	3–0	—	1–0
12	Tatran Prešov (R)	32	6	12	14	29	43	−14	30	Relegation to the 2. Liga	2–1	0–1	3–0	0–0	0–0	—

Source: Niké liga (in Slovak)
Rules for classification: 1) Points; 2) Points in regular season; 3) Head-to-head points in regular season; 4) Head-to-head goal difference in regular season; 5) Head-to-head goals scored in regular season; 6) Head-to-head away goals scored in regular season (if two teams tied); 7) Goal difference; 8) Goals scored; 9) Fair play ranking; 10) Drawing of lots.
(O) Play-off winners; (R) Relegated

===== Results summary =====
Overall								Home						Away					
Pld	W	D	L	GF	GA	GD	Pts	W	D	L	GF	GA	GD	W	D	L	GF	GA	GD
10	6	1	3	16	13	+3	19	5	0	0	11	3	+8	1	1	3	5	10	−5

Source: Worldfootball

===== Results by round =====
Round	23	24	25	26	27	28	29	30	31	32
Ground	H	A	H	H	A	A	H	A	H	A
Result	W	D	W	W	W	L	W	L	W	L
Position	7	7	7	7	7	7	7	7	7	7
Points	27	28	31	34	37	37	40	40	43	43

Source: Worldfootball
A = Away; H = Home; W = Win; D = Draw; L = Loss

===== Matches =====
7 March 2026 23	Košice	2–0	Trenčín	Košice
15:30 CET (UTC+1)	Perišić 37' (pen.); Lichý (yellow card) 69'; Krivák 75'; Dąbrowski (yellow card) 87'	Report	Hájovský (yellow card) 20'; Križan (yellow card) 44'; Soares (yellow card) 88'	Stadium: Košická futbalová aréna Attendance: 2,692; Referee: Erik Gemzický; Assistant referees: Daniel Poláček, Tomáš Vorel

14 March 2026 24	Ružomberok	1–1	Košice	Ružomberok
15:30 CET (UTC+1)	Tučný 2'; Hladík (yellow card) 47'	Report	Lichý 48', (yellow card) 90'; Kružliak (yellow card) 82'	Stadium: Štadión pod Čebraťom; Attendance: 1,288; Referee: Michal Smolák; Assistant referees: Mário Roszbeck, Juraj Halíček

21 March 2026 25	Košice	2–1	Tatran Prešov	Košice
18:00 CET (UTC+1)	Čerepkai 12' (pen.); Gallovič 56'; Perišić (yellow card) 82'; Kakay (yellow card) 89'	Report	Taraduda 90'; Souček (yellow card) 90'; Tatolna (yellow card) 90'	Stadium: Košická futbalová aréna Attendance: 7,044; Referee: Ivan Kružliak; Assistant referees: Branislav Hancko, Dušan Štofik

4 April 2026 26	Košice	2–0	Skalica	Košice
15:30 CEST (UTC+2)	Rehuš 26', 40'; Madleňák (yellow card) 47'; Krivák (yellow card) 78'	Report	Smejkal (yellow card) 39'; Gaži (yellow card) 84'	Stadium: Košická futbalová aréna Attendance: 2,869; Referee: Erik Gemzický; Assistant referees: Milan Štrbo, Ákos Juhos

12 April 2026 27	Komárno	1–2	Košice	Zlaté Moravce
15:30 CEST (UTC+2)	Žák 45'	Report	Miljanić 6'; Perišić 9'; Julardžija (yellow card) 13'; Magda (yellow card) 15'; Čerepkai (yellow card) 74'	Stadium: ViOn Aréna; Attendance: 340; Referee: Boris Marhefka; Assistant referees: Pavel Jánošík, Rastislav Kuba

19 April 2026 28	Tatran Prešov	2–1	Košice	Prešov
18:00 CEST (UTC+2)	Begala 1'; Souček 8'; Taraduda (yellow card) 14'; Menich (yellow card) 45'	Report	Metu (yellow card) 56'; Lichý (yellow card) 90', (goal) 90+2'	Stadium: Futbal Tatran Arena; Attendance: 4,945; Referee: Michal Očenáš; Assistant referees: Milan Štrbo, Tomáš Vorel

25 April 2026 29	Košice	3–1	Ružomberok	Košice
18:00 CEST (UTC+2)	Sovič 10'; Kovács 13'; Lichý 28'	Report	Selecký 68' (pen.)	Stadium: Košická futbalová aréna Attendance: 2,518; Referee: Peter Ziemba; Assistant referees: Dávid Bobko, Rastislav Kuba

5 May 2026 30	Skalica	3–1	Košice	Skalica
18:00 CEST (UTC+2)	Šuver 29'; Daniel (yellow card) 65', (goal) 67'; Šimko 90+4'	Report	Čerepkai 68'	Stadium: Mestský štadión Skalica; Attendance: 1,650; Referee: Boris Marhefka; Assistant referees: Andrej Hrmo, Rastislav Kuba

10 May 2026 31	Košice	2–1	Komárno	Košice
17:00 CEST (UTC+2)	Madleňák 2'; Kovács 35'; Kóša (yellow card) 79'; Lukačević (yellow card) 83'	Report	Palán (yellow card) 38'; Ganbayar 70'; Žák (yellow card) 81'	Stadium: Košická futbalová aréna Attendance: 4,188; Referee: Michal Očenáš; Assistant referees: Tomáš Vorel, Pavel Jánošík

16 May 2026 32	Trenčín	3–0	Košice	Trenčín
17:00 CEST (UTC+2)	David 31'; Skovajsa 37'; Poom (yellow card) 53'; Soares 74'	Report		Stadium: Štadión Sihoť; Attendance: 961; Referee: Maroš Libiak; Assistant referees: Rastislav Kuba, Simeon Vass

=== Slovak Cup ===
27 August 2025 Second round	Kendice	0–5	Košice	Kendice
17:00 CEST (UTC+2)		Report	Miljanić 10', 20'; Metu 30'; Teplan 65'; Rehuš 81'	Stadium: Štadión FK Slovan Kendice; Attendance: 1,456; Referee: Lukáš Dzivjak; Assistant referees: Tobiáš Pacák, Simeon Vass

14 September 2025 Third round	Spišské Podhradie	1–7	Košice	Spišské Podhradie
18:00 CEST (UTC+2)	Petrík 86'	Report	Perišić 9', 39'; Rehuš 33', 43', 54'; Palacín 73'; Metu 77'	Stadium: Štadión MŠK Spišské Podhradie; Attendance: 496; Referee: Peter Židišin; Assistant referees: Dávid Bobko, Peter Mihalík

22 October 2025 Fourth round	Zlaté Moravce	2–4	Košice	Zlaté Moravce
18:00 CEST (UTC+2)	Nonikashvili 8', (penalty missed) 45'; Kuzma 90'	Report	Perišić 37'; Miljanić 71', 90'; Magda (yellow card) 77'; Jones 83'	Stadium: ViOn Aréna; Attendance: 351; Referee: Peter Kráľovič; Assistant referees: Milan Štrbo, Martin Krivošík

10 December 2025 Round of 16	Ružomberok	2–4	Košice	Ružomberok
15:00 CET (UTC+1)	Hladík 76', 90'	Report	Sovič 3'; Rehuš 33', 58'; Teplan (yellow card) 55'; Magda 79'	Stadium: Štadión pod Čebraťom; Attendance: 551; Referee: Michal Smolák; Assistant referees: Daniel Poláček, Peter Bednár; Fourth official: Marián Ruc

4 March 2026 Quarter-finals	Košice	4–0	DAC Dunajská Streda	Košice
18:00 CET (UTC+1)	Gallovič 25'; Miljanić 41'; Lukačević 53'; Perišić 83'	Report	Kukovec (yellow card) 38'; Kacharaba (yellow card) 52'	Stadium: Košická futbalová aréna Attendance: 4,989; Referee: Erik Gemzický; Assistant referees: Daniel Poláček, Peter Čajka; Fourth official: Lukáš Dzivjak

17 March 2026 Semi-finals First leg	Tatran Prešov	2–2	Košice	Prešov
18:00 CET (UTC+1)	Barbosa 12'; Masaryk 50'	Report	Čerepkai 72'; Kružliak 90'	Stadium: Futbal Tatran Arena; Attendance: 4,884; Referee: Peter Kráľovič; Assistant referees: Milan Štrbo, Martin Vitko; Fourth official: Igor Valent

15 April 2026 Semi-finals Second leg	Košice	2–1 (a.e.t.) (4–3 agg.)	Tatran Prešov	Košice
18:00 CEST (UTC+2)	Krivák (yellow card) 23'; Čerepkai 34'; Dimun (yellow card) 90+4', (goal) 99'; Gallovič (yellow card) 112'; Kružliak (yellow card) 113'; Miljanić (yellow card) 120'	Report	Barbosa 19', (yellow card) 36'; Regáli (yellow card) 26'; Sagna (yellow card) 33'; Souček (yellow card) 70'; Taraduda (yellow card) 84'; Medveděv (yellow card) 90'; Šimko (yellow card) 90+4'	Stadium: Košická futbalová aréna Attendance: 9,662; Referee: Erik Gemzický; Assistant referees: Daniel Poláček, Adam Jekkel; Fourth official: Maroš Libiak
Note: Košice won 4–3 on aggregate.

1 May 2026 Final	Žilina	3–1	Košice	Žilina
16:00 CEST (UTC+2)	Faško 16'; Kaša 40'; Roginić 48', (yellow card) 88'	Report	Madleňák (yellow card) 33'; Dimun (yellow card) 88'; Miljanić 89'	Stadium: Štadión pod Dubňom; Attendance: 9,723; Referee: Peter Kráľovič; Assistant referees: Milan Štrbo, Matej Zemko; Fourth official: Martin Dohál

=== UEFA Conference League ===
==== Qualifying ====
===== Second qualifying round =====
24 July 2025 First leg	Košice (Slovakia)	2–3	(Belarus) Neman Grodno	Košice, Slovakia
20:00 CEST (UTC+2)	Miljanić 8'; Čerepkai 16'; Gallovič (yellow card) 42'; Kružliak (penalty missed) 90+4'	Report	Zubovich (yellow card) 37'; Savitsky 55', 66'; Kravtsov 79' (pen.)	Stadium: Košická futbalová aréna Attendance: 10,102; Referee: Lionel Tschudi (Switzerland); Assistant referees: Jonas Erni (Switzerland), Tuberosa Nicolas (Switzerland); Fourth official: Johannes von Mandach (Switzerland)

31 July 2025 Second leg	Neman Grodno (Belarus)	1–1 (4–3 agg.)	(Slovakia) Košice	Szeged, Hungary (Note: Due to the country's involvement in the Russian invasion of Ukraine, Belarusian teams were required to play their home matches at neutral venues and behind closed doors until further notice. Therefore, Neman Grodno played at Szent Gellért Fórum, Szeged, Hungary, instead of their regular stadium Neman Stadium, Grodno.)
20:00 CEST (UTC+2)	Yevdokimov 90+1'	Report	Dimun (yellow card) 26'; Kružliak (yellow card) 30'; Krivák (yellow card) 45+4'; Gallovič (yellow card) 78'; Bakalar (yellow card) 78' (not on pitch); Čerepkai (yellow card) 87'; Domik 90+3'	Stadium: Szent Gellért Fórum; Attendance: 0 Referee: Walter Altmann (Austria); Assistant referees: Mattias Hartl (Austria), Luka Katholnig (Austria); Fourth official: Daniel Pfister (Austria)
Note: Neman Grodno won 4–3 on aggregate.
