= List of Slovak football transfers summer 2025 =

Notable Slovak football transfers in the summer transfer window 2025 by club. Only transfers of the Nike Liga and 2. liga are included.

== Nike Liga ==
=== ŠK Slovan Bratislava ===
In: Note: Flags indicate national team as defined under FIFA eligibility rules; some limited exceptions apply. Players may hold more than one non-FIFA nationality.

No.	Pos.	Nation	Player
—	MF	GHA	Kelvin Ofori (from FC Spartak Trnava)
3	MF	SVK	Peter Pokorný (from (Poland) Śląsk Wrocław)
9	FW	UKR	Mykola Kukharevych (from (England) Swansea)
14	FW	GAM	Alasana Yirajang (from FK Železiarne Podbrezová)
—	DF	ANG	Sandro Cruz (from (Portugal) Gil Vicente F.C.)
—	DF	CMR	Sidoine Fogning (from (Portugal) Boavista F.C.)
99	FW	SVN	Andraž Šporar (from (Turkey) Alanyaspor)

Out: Note: Flags indicate national team as defined under FIFA eligibility rules; some limited exceptions apply. Players may hold more than one non-FIFA nationality.

No.	Pos.	Nation	Player
33	MF	SVK	Juraj Kucka (Retired)
—	DF	SVK	Lukáš Pauschek (Released and joined MFK Zemplín Michalovce)
—	DF	BEL	Siemen Voet (Released and joined (Germany) TSV 1860 Munich)
93	FW	TOG	Idjessi Metsoko (loan return to (Czech Republic) Viktoria Plzeň)
—	DF	SVK	Matúš Vojtko (to (Poland) Lechia Gdańsk)
—	MF	SVK	Július Szöke (to (Cyprus) AEL Limassol)
—	FW	SVK	David Strelec (to (England) Middlesbrough F.C.)

=== FC DAC 1904 Dunajská Streda ===
In: Note: Flags indicate national team as defined under FIFA eligibility rules; some limited exceptions apply. Players may hold more than one non-FIFA nationality.

No.	Pos.	Nation	Player
—	FW	AUT	Andreas Gruber (from FK Austria Wien)
81	DF	SVN	Klemen Nemanič (from (Slovenia) NK Celje)
—	FW	SEN	Abdoulaye Gueye (from (Latvia) SK Super Nova)
—	FW	GEO	Giorgi Gagua (from (Croatia) NK Istra 1961)
—	FW	GAM	Pa Assan Corr (from (Estonia) Paide Linnameeskond)
—	DF	CIV	Julien Bationo (from (Armenia) FC Alashkert)

Out: Note: Flags indicate national team as defined under FIFA eligibility rules; some limited exceptions apply. Players may hold more than one non-FIFA nationality.

No.	Pos.	Nation	Player
—	DF	BRA	Mateus Brunetti (Released and joined (Japan) Shimizu S-Pulse)
—	MF	SVK	Milan Dimun (Released and joined FC Košice)
—	DF	CGO	Yhoan Andzouana (to (Turkey) Konyaspor)
—	FW	GRE	Giannis Niarchos (to (Poland) Wisła Płock)
—	MF	GAM	Mahmudu Bajo (to (Serbia) Red Star Belgrade)
—	MF	HUN	Levente Bősze (to (Italy) Como U19)

=== FC Spartak Trnava ===
In: Note: Flags indicate national team as defined under FIFA eligibility rules; some limited exceptions apply. Players may hold more than one non-FIFA nationality.

No.	Pos.	Nation	Player
93	FW	TOG	Idjessi Metsoko (on loan from (Czech Republic) FC Viktoria Plzeň)
44	DF	UKR	Denys Taraduda (from MFK Zemplín Michalovce)
7	MF	AUT	Stefan Skrbo (from (Austria) WSG Tirol)
2	DF	SWE	Patrick Nwadike (from (Sweden) IK Sirius)
27	DF	SVK	Michal Tomič (from (Czech Republic) SK Slavia Prague)
18	MF	NGA	Hilary Gong (from (Poland) Widzew Łódź)
28	MF	GEO	Giorgi Moistsrapishvili (from (Georgia (country)) FC Kolkheti-1913 Poti)
15	DF	SVK	Kristián Koštrna (from FK Železiarne Podbrezová)
19	FW	SVK	Timotej Kudlička (on loan from OFK Malženice)
30	MF	GEO	Luka Khorkheli (from (Georgia (country)) FC Samgurali Tskaltubo)
12	FW	NGA	Abdulrahman Taiwo (on loan from (Latvia) Riga FC)
15	DF	SRB	Lazar Stojsavljević (from (Russia) PFC Sochi)

Out: Note: Flags indicate national team as defined under FIFA eligibility rules; some limited exceptions apply. Players may hold more than one non-FIFA nationality.

No.	Pos.	Nation	Player
2	DF	SVK	Lukáš Štetina (End of contract and joined FC Nitra)
7	MF	SVK	Róbert Pich (End of contract and joined FC Nitra)
8	MF	BEL	Milan Corryn (Released)
18	DF	SVK	Martin Šulek (End of contract and joined MFK Ružomberok)
23	MF	CZE	Erik Daniel (Released and joined MFK Skalica)
28	MF	SVK	Martin Bukata (End of contract and joined FC ViOn Zlaté Moravce)
31	GK	SVK	Dobrivoj Rusov (Retired)
80	MF	SVN	Adrian Zeljković (to (Czech Republic) FC Viktoria Plzeň)
97	MF	GHA	Kelvin Ofori (End of contract and joined ŠK Slovan Bratislava)

=== MŠK Žilina ===
In: Note: Flags indicate national team as defined under FIFA eligibility rules; some limited exceptions apply. Players may hold more than one non-FIFA nationality.

No.	Pos.	Nation	Player
—	MF	SVK	Michal Faško (from FC Košice)
—	FW	CZE	Lukáš Juliš (from (Czech Republic) SK Sigma Olomouc)
—	DF	CZE	Filip Kaša (from (Hungary) Győri ETO FC)

Out: Note: Flags indicate national team as defined under FIFA eligibility rules; some limited exceptions apply. Players may hold more than one non-FIFA nationality.

No.	Pos.	Nation	Player
—	DF	SVK	Tomáš Hubočan (Retired)
—	MF	SVK	Mário Sauer (to (France) Toulouse FC)
15	DF	CIV	Adama Drame (to (Austria) Wolfsberger AC)
—	FW	SVK	Dávid Ďuriš (to (Norway) Rosenborg BK)
—	MF	GHA	Samuel Gidi (to (United States) FC Cincinnati)
—	FW	SVK	Adrián Kaprálik (to (Germany) Holstein Kiel)

=== MFK Ružomberok ===
In: Note: Flags indicate national team as defined under FIFA eligibility rules; some limited exceptions apply. Players may hold more than one non-FIFA nationality.

No.	Pos.	Nation	Player
—	DF	SVK	Adrián Slávik (from FK Železiarne Podbrezová)
—	MF	SVK	Vojtěch Novák (from (Czech Republic) Bohemians 1905)
18	DF	SVK	Martin Šulek (from FC Spartak Trnava)

Out: Note: Flags indicate national team as defined under FIFA eligibility rules; some limited exceptions apply. Players may hold more than one non-FIFA nationality.

No.	Pos.	Nation	Player
—	DF	SVK	Ján Maslo (Retired)
—	DF	SVK	Matej Madleňák (to FK Košice)
—	MF	SVK	Samuel Lavrinčík (to (Czech Republic) FK Jablonec)
—	FW	SVK	Štefan Gerec (to FK Dukla Banská Bystrica)

=== FK Železiarne Podbrezová ===
In: Note: Flags indicate national team as defined under FIFA eligibility rules; some limited exceptions apply. Players may hold more than one non-FIFA nationality.

No.	Pos.	Nation	Player
—	FW	SVK	Matúš Marcin (from MFK Zemplin Michalovce)
—	FW	CZE	Radek Šiler (from AC Sparta Prague B)
—	DF	SVK	Branislav Niňaj (from (Romania) Sepsi OSK)

Out: Note: Flags indicate national team as defined under FIFA eligibility rules; some limited exceptions apply. Players may hold more than one non-FIFA nationality.

No.	Pos.	Nation	Player
—	GK	SVK	Pavol Bajza (to Tatran Prešov)
—	FW	GAM	Alasana Yirajang (to ŠK Slovan Bratislava)
—	DF	SVK	Kristián Koštrna (to FC Spartak Trnava)
28	GK	SVK	Adam Danko (to (Denmark) Kolding IF)
—	MF	SVK	Matej Grešák (Released)
9	FW	CZE	Daniel Smékal} (to (Czech Republic) FK Pardubice)

=== FC Tatran Prešov ===
In: Note: Flags indicate national team as defined under FIFA eligibility rules; some limited exceptions apply. Players may hold more than one non-FIFA nationality.

No.	Pos.	Nation	Player
—	GK	SVK	Pavol Bajza (from FK Železiarne Podbrezová)
—	MF	SVK	Roman Begala (from FC Petržalka)
―	DF	SVK	Michal Sipľak (from (Poland) Puszcza Niepołomice)
―	DF	MDA	Ioan-Călin Revenco (from (Poland) Puszcza Niepołomice)
―	FW	POL	Łukasz Wolsztyński (from (Poland) Stal Mielec)
―	FW	SVK	Peter Juritka (on loan from Podbrezová)
―	DF	CZE	Václav Míka (on loan from (Czech Republic) Viktoria Plzeň)
―	MF	CZE	Filip Souček (from (Czech Republic) Sparta Prague)
―	MF	POR	Hélder Morim (from (Portugal) G.D. Chaves)
―	MF	UKR	Kyrylo Siheyev (on loan from (Ukraine) Shakhtar Donetsk)
―	DF	LVA	Daniels Balodis (from (Scotland) St Johnstone F.C.)
―	FW	LVA	Gļebs Patika (from (Cyprus) Pafos FC U19)
―	MF	FRA	Dominique Simon (on loan from (Czech Republic) FK Pardubice)

Out: Note: Flags indicate national team as defined under FIFA eligibility rules; some limited exceptions apply. Players may hold more than one non-FIFA nationality.

No.	Pos.	Nation	Player
—	GK	SVK	Alex Fojtíček (Released)
—	DF	ARM	Abov Avetisyan (Released)
—	MF	NGA	David Fadairo (Released)
—	MF	SVK	Adam Horvát (Released)
—	MF	SWE	Hugo Ahl (Released and joined MFK Zemplín Michalovce)
—	DF	POL	Dariusz Pawłowski (loan return to (Poland) Radomiak Radom)
—	DF	BRA	Willian Correia (Released)
—	MF	ESP	Oscar Castellano Matallana (Released)
—	FW	SVK	Matej Franko (Released)
—	DF	SVK	Richard Nagy (Released)
—	FW	SVK	Samuel Gladiš (Released)
—	MF	SVK	Lukáš Jendrek (Released)
—	MF	SVK	Denis Potoma (Released)

=== AS Trenčín ===
In: Note: Flags indicate national team as defined under FIFA eligibility rules; some limited exceptions apply. Players may hold more than one non-FIFA nationality.

No.	Pos.	Nation	Player
―	DF	CRO	Viktor Šimić (from (Croatia) NK Lokomotiva Zagreb)
―	DF	SVK	Richard Križan (Free agent)
―	DF	BFA	Dylann Kam (Free agent)
―	FW	IDN	Marselino Ferdinan (on loan from (England) Oxford United)
―	MF	KAZ	Shakhmurza Adyrbekov (Free agent)

Out: Note: Flags indicate national team as defined under FIFA eligibility rules; some limited exceptions apply. Players may hold more than one non-FIFA nationality.

No.	Pos.	Nation	Player
―	FW	NGA	Chinonso Emeka (to (Czech Republic) FK Dukla Prague)
―	MF	SVK	Damián Bariš (to MFK Skalica)

=== MFK Skalica ===
In: Note: Flags indicate national team as defined under FIFA eligibility rules; some limited exceptions apply. Players may hold more than one non-FIFA nationality.

No.	Pos.	Nation	Player
—	MF	CZE	Erik Daniel (from FC Spartak Trnava)
―	MF	SVK	Damián Bariš (to AS Trenčín)
17	MF	CZE	Petr Pudhorocký (on loan from (Czech Republic) Hradec Králové)

Out: Note: Flags indicate national team as defined under FIFA eligibility rules; some limited exceptions apply. Players may hold more than one non-FIFA nationality.

No.	Pos.	Nation	Player
—	GK	SVK	Lukáš Hroššo (Released and joined Dukla Banská Bystrica)
—	DF	SVK	Adam Krčík (to KFC Komárno)
—	MF	SVK	Ján Vlasko (Released)
—	MF	CZE	Róbert Matejov (Released)
—	FW	AUT	Alex Sobczyk (Released)

=== MFK Zemplín Michalovce ===
In: Note: Flags indicate national team as defined under FIFA eligibility rules; some limited exceptions apply. Players may hold more than one non-FIFA nationality.

No.	Pos.	Nation	Player
—	MF	SWE	Hugo Ahl (from 1. FC Tatran Presov)
—	DF	SVK	Lukáš Pauschek (from Free Agent)
—	FW	LTU	Gytis Paulauskas (from (Ukraine) FC Kolos Kovalivka)

Out: Note: Flags indicate national team as defined under FIFA eligibility rules; some limited exceptions apply. Players may hold more than one non-FIFA nationality.

No.	Pos.	Nation	Player
—	MF	GRE	Alexandros Kyziridis (to (Scotland) Heart of Midlothian F.C.)
—	DF	UKR	Denys Taraduda (to FC Spartak Trnava)
—	FW	SVK	Matúš Marcin (to FK Železiarne Podbrezová)
—	MF	SVK	Igor Žofčák (Retired)
—	FW	SVK	Adam Žulevič (to (Italy) Genoa CFC)
—	MF	HUN	Artúr Musák (to (Czech Republic) FC Baník Ostrava)

=== FC Košice ===
In: Note: Flags indicate national team as defined under FIFA eligibility rules; some limited exceptions apply. Players may hold more than one non-FIFA nationality.

No.	Pos.	Nation	Player
—	FW	SVK	Adam Goljan (from (Czech Republic) AC Sparta Prague)
—	DF	SVK	Matej Madleňák (from MFK Ružomberok)
—	MF	SVK	Milan Rehuš (from (Germany) TSG 1899 Hoffenheim)
—	MF	SVK	Milan Dimun (from Dunajská Streda)
—	FW	MNE	Vladimir Perišić (on loan from (Czech Republic) SK Slavia Prague)
―	DF	AUT	Emilian Metu (from (Austria) SV Horn)
―	DF	SLE	Osman Kakay (from (Portugal) Boavista)
98	GK	POL	Kevin Dąbrowski (from Free Agent)

Out: Note: Flags indicate national team as defined under FIFA eligibility rules; some limited exceptions apply. Players may hold more than one non-FIFA nationality.

No.	Pos.	Nation	Player
—	MF	SVK	Michal Faško (Released and joined MŠK Žilina)
—	FW	GRE	Giannis Niarchos (loan return to FC DAC 1904 Dunajská Streda)
—	DF	FIN	Kevin Kouassivi-Benissan (loan return to (Finland) HJK)
—	DF	FRA	Nassim Innocenti (to (Czech Republic) FK Jablonec)
5	DF	SVK	Jakub Jakubko (to (Czech Republic) FK Teplice)

=== KFC Komárno ===
In: Note: Flags indicate national team as defined under FIFA eligibility rules; some limited exceptions apply. Players may hold more than one non-FIFA nationality.

No.	Pos.	Nation	Player
—	DF	SVK	Adam Krčík (from MFK Skalica)
—	MF	SVK	Filip Kiss (from Free Agent)

Out: Note: Flags indicate national team as defined under FIFA eligibility rules; some limited exceptions apply. Players may hold more than one non-FIFA nationality.

No.	Pos.	Nation	Player
-	FW	SVK	Jakub Sylvestr (to MFK Zvolen)

== MONACObet liga ==
=== Dukla Banská Bystrica ===
In: Note: Flags indicate national team as defined under FIFA eligibility rules; some limited exceptions apply. Players may hold more than one non-FIFA nationality.

No.	Pos.	Nation	Player
—	GK	SVK	Lukáš Hroššo (from MFK Skalica)
—	FW	SVK	Oliver Reiter (from MFK Tatran Liptovský Mikuláš)
—	DF	NGA	Kazeem Bolaji (from FC Spartak Trnava)
—	DF	SVK	Adam Kopas (from MFK Skalica)
—	FW	SRB	Boris Krstič (from FK Humenné)
—	FW	URU	Enzo Arevalo (from MFK Zemplín Michalovce)
—	MF	BRA	Davi Alves (from MFK Skalica)
—	FW	SVK	Štefan Gerec (from MFK Ružomberok)
—	GK	NGA	Mathew Yakubu (from OFK Baník Lehota pod Vtáčnikom)
—	MF	BRA	João Vitor Miranda (from (Spain) Real Valladolid academy)

Out: Note: Flags indicate national team as defined under FIFA eligibility rules; some limited exceptions apply. Players may hold more than one non-FIFA nationality.

No.	Pos.	Nation	Player
—	DF	GHA	Ivan Anokye Mensah (to (Czech Republic) Sparta Prague B)
—	FW	SVK	Martin Rymarenko (to (Czech Republic) FC Zbrojovka Brno)
—	DF	SVK	Marián Pišoja (to (Czech Republic) FC Zlín)
—	DF	SVK	Timotej Záhumenský (to FC ViOn Zlaté Moravce)
—	FW	SVK	Tomáš Malec (Released and joined (Austria) Ybbs)
—	DF	SVK	Boris Godál (Released and joined TJ Lovča)
—	MF	SVK	Marek Hlinka (Released and joined (Czech Republic) Kroměříž)
—	FW	SVK	Gabriel Demian (Released)
—	DF	SVK	Bernard Petrák (Released)
—	MF	SVK	Matúš Köröš (Released)
—	FW	NGA	Lucky Ezeh (loan return to (Czech Republic) MFK Karviná)

=== FK Pohronie ===
In: Note: Flags indicate national team as defined under FIFA eligibility rules; some limited exceptions apply. Players may hold more than one non-FIFA nationality.

No.	Pos.	Nation	Player
—	DF	SVK	Martin Dobrotka (from Free Agent)

Out: Note: Flags indicate national team as defined under FIFA eligibility rules; some limited exceptions apply. Players may hold more than one non-FIFA nationality.

No.	Pos.	Nation	Player

=== ViOn Zlaté Moravce ===
In: Note: Flags indicate national team as defined under FIFA eligibility rules; some limited exceptions apply. Players may hold more than one non-FIFA nationality.

No.	Pos.	Nation	Player
—	MF	SVK	Martin Bukata (from FC Spartak Trnava)

Out: Note: Flags indicate national team as defined under FIFA eligibility rules; some limited exceptions apply. Players may hold more than one non-FIFA nationality.

No.	Pos.	Nation	Player
34	MF	SVK	Lukáš Greššák (to FC Nitra)

=== Redfox FC Stará Ľubovňa ===
In: Note: Flags indicate national team as defined under FIFA eligibility rules; some limited exceptions apply. Players may hold more than one non-FIFA nationality.

No.	Pos.	Nation	Player

Out: Note: Flags indicate national team as defined under FIFA eligibility rules; some limited exceptions apply. Players may hold more than one non-FIFA nationality.

No.	Pos.	Nation	Player

=== MFK Zvolen ===
In: Note: Flags indicate national team as defined under FIFA eligibility rules; some limited exceptions apply. Players may hold more than one non-FIFA nationality.

No.	Pos.	Nation	Player
-	FW	SVK	Jakub Sylvestr (from KFC Komárno)

Out: Note: Flags indicate national team as defined under FIFA eligibility rules; some limited exceptions apply. Players may hold more than one non-FIFA nationality.

No.	Pos.	Nation	Player
—	FW	SVK	Patrik Abrahám (to TJ Lovča)
