= Eastern Slovak derby =

Derby match in Slovakia

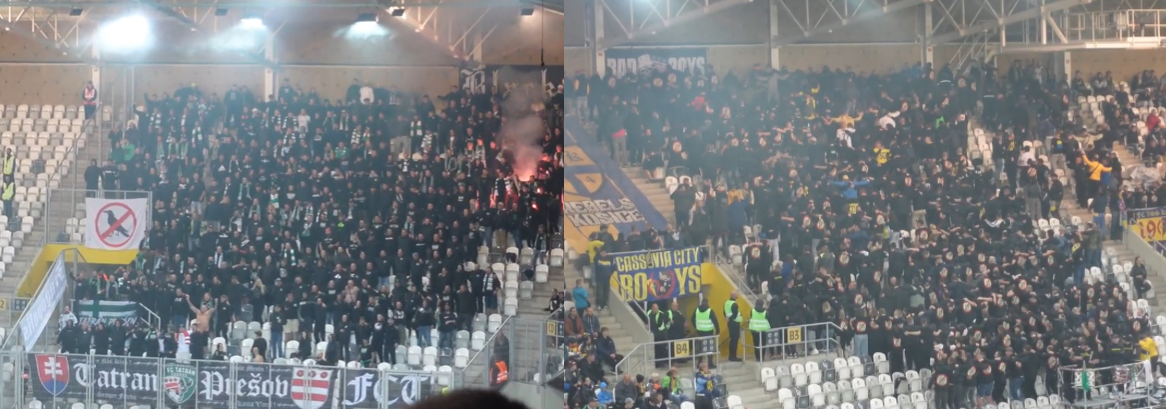
- Tatran fans (right) and Košice fans (left) in a derby match in 2025
- Native name: Východniarske derby
- Sport: Football
- Teams: Tatran Prešov; FC Košice
- Latest meeting: Tatran Prešov 2–1 Košice; Niké liga, round 28; 19 April 2026

The Eastern Slovak derby (Slovak: Východniarske derby) is the name for the rivalry between the two Slovak football teams 1. FC Tatran Prešov and FC Košice. The two teams are historically some of the most successful clubs in Slovakia. The game is considered the one of the most prestigious matches in the Slovak football calendar, following the Traditional derby between Slovan Bratislava and Spartak Trnava.

== History ==
Derby matches between the two teams were first played during the early years of Czechoslovakia. Both clubs were relegated at the beginning of the century. The teams played in a direct battle for survival in the last round of the 2001–02 Slovak Superliga season. FC VSS Košice needed a win to stay in the competition, and a draw would be enough for Prešov. Košice won the game 2–1, turning the score around after half-time. However, Košice were relegated in the following 2002–03 Slovak Superliga season.

=== 2013–2025: Decline of both clubs ===
The teams last met in a first league match on May 18, 2013, when Tatran Prešov drew 0–0 with MFK Košice at their old stadium. A significant decline in football in both cities followed, VSS Košice even ceased to exist and a new club formed in 2018, FC Košice. Like Tatran Prešov, it had to start in the third league and work its way back to the top flight.

=== 2025–present: Recent years ===
In 2025, for the first time in 12 years, the derby match would be played. Košice would host the match, which ended in a 2–2 draw, with Prešov player Martin Regáli missing a penalty in the 92nd minute of the game. After the match, it was found that the bathrooms in the Košice Football Arena were destroyed by the Tatran Ultras. The destruction was heavily criticized by the Slovak media. The clubs faced again on 14 February 2026, with the Futbal Tatran Arena being sold out 2 weeks prior. Before the match, two streets were closed for safety reasons. Košice would win the derby 4–1, following the sending off of Moritz Römling.

== Results ==
=== League ===
Slovakia (1993–present)
	Košice — Tatran				Tatran — Košice			
Season	R.	Date	Atten.	Score	R.	Date	Atten.	Score
2001–02	18	24.11.2002	—	2–1	9	22.09.2001	—	1–1
2001–02	36	8.06.2002	—	2–1	27	20.04.2002	—	2–1
2008–09	11	4.10.2008	1,600	5–5	22	22.03.2009	4,511	1–2
2008–09	33	30.05.2009	2,250	1–1	—			
2009–10	10	2.09.2009	1,250	0–1	21	7.03.2010	1,762	1–1
2009–10	32	8.05.2010	1,980	3–1	—			
2010–11	18	26.11.2010	1,300	4–0	7	28.08.2010	2,510	1–1
2010–11	—				29	4.05.2011	1,522	0–3
2011–12	9	17.09.2011	3,100	1–0	20	3.03.2012	2,555	0–1
2011–12	31	12.05.2012	850	0–0	—			
2012–13	20	2.03.2013	4,155	3–0	9	15.09.2012	2,730	0–0
2012–13	—				31	18.05.2013	1,750	0–0
2022–23	2	23.07.2022	4,011	2–1	17	12.11.2022	938	2–1
2025–26	9	27.09.2025	8,111	2–2	20	14.02.2026	6,398	1–4
2025–26	25	21.03.2026	7,044	2–1	28	18.04.2026	4,945	2-1

== Players who have played or managed for both teams ==
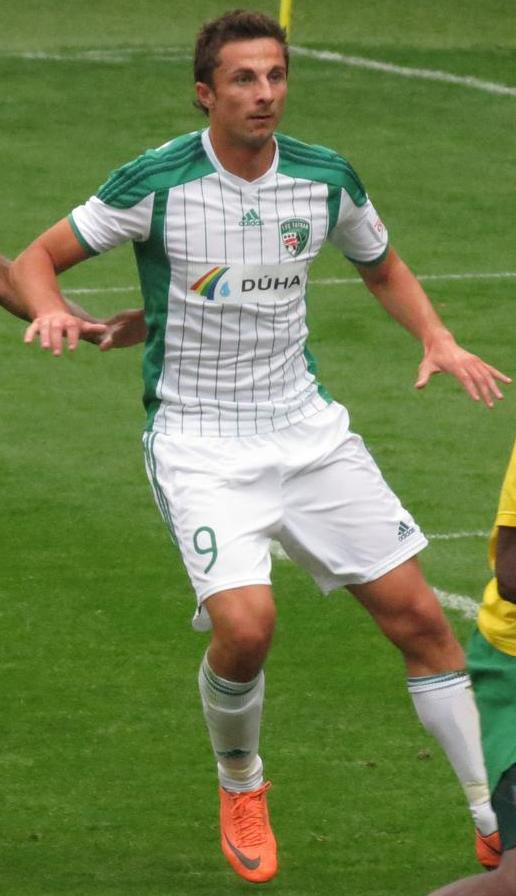
Jaroslav Kolbas would make over 150 appearances for Košice before joining Tatran Prešov.

Despite being rivals on the pitch, both Tatran and Košice have maintained pragmatic business relations off it with frequent player transfers, including direct moves between the two clubs. The list includes players who played for Tatran, and both VSS and FC Košice clubs.

Players who transferred between the clubs are often called traitors or Judasists by the fans groups.

=== Tatran, then Košice ===
Players

- Marián Strelec
- Vladislav Zvara
- Peter Bašista
- Miroslav Nemec
- Serhiy Zaytsev
- Richard Kačala
- Milan Jambor
- Stanislav Kišš
- Roman Lazúr
- Miroslav Seman
- Dávid Leško
- Jozef Kožlej
- Miroslav Drobňák
- Bogdan Stefanović
- Marek Fabuľa
- Jozef Bomba
- Miroslav Viazanko
- Albert Rusnák
- Gejza Pulen
- Alexander Felszeghy
- Lukáš Janič
- Peter Šinglár

Managers

- Štefan Jačiansky
- Ján Zachar
- Jozef Karel
- Jozef Obert

=== Košice, then Tatran ===
Players

- Miroslav Sovič
- Roman Begala
- Marián Bochnovič
- Ondrej Elexa
- Jaroslav Galko
- Ján Novák
- Jaroslav Kolbas
- Štefan Zošák
- Pavol Jurčo
- Miroslav Sovič
- Róbert Zeher
- Cyril Stachura
- Juraj Hovančík
- Marián Bochnovič
- Ján Strausz
- Rastislav Ján Lazorík
- Mojmír Trebuňák
- Kamil Karaš

Managers

- Štefan Tarkovič
- Miroslav Jantek

== See also ==
- List of association football club rivalries in Europe
