= Karlo Miljanić =

Croatian footballer

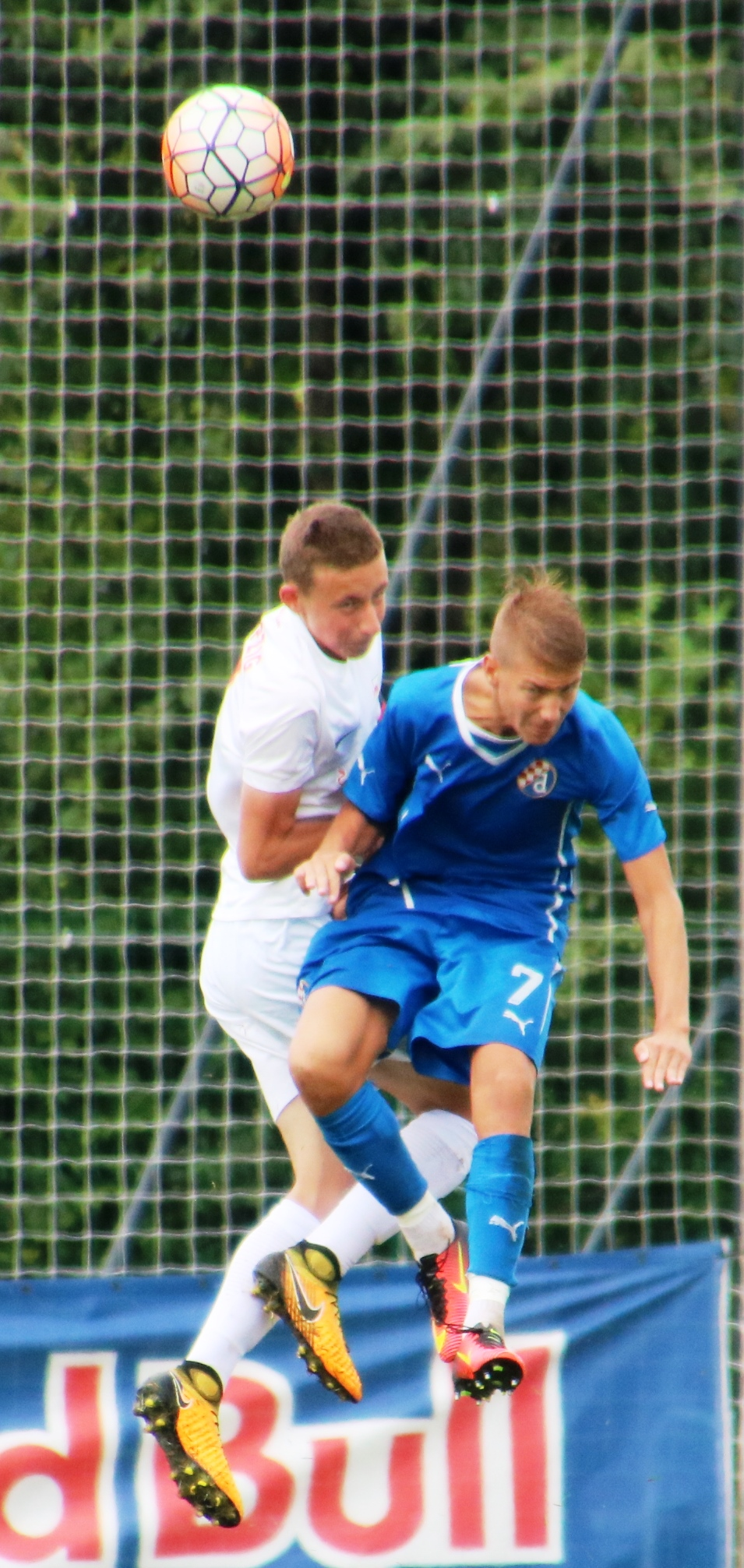
- Miljanić (in blue) playing for Dinamo Zagreb in a U16 tournament

Personal information
- Full name: Karlo Miljanić
- Date of birth: 2 January 2002 (age 24)
- Place of birth: Vinkovci, Croatia
- Height: 1.87 m (6 ft 2 in)
- Position: Winger

Team information
- Current team: Podbrezová
- Number: 27

Youth career
- 2014–2015: HNK Cibalia
- 2015: Cibalia
- 2015–2017: Dinamo Zagreb
- 2018–2019: Hajduk Split

Senior career*
| Years | Team | Apps | (Gls) |
| 2019−2024 | Cibalia | 112 | (18) |
| 2024–2026 | FC Košice | 48 | (6) |
| 2026– | Podbrezová | 7 | (0) |
- * Club domestic league appearances and goals as of 21 September 2026

Karlo Miljanić (born 2 January 2002) is a Croatian footballer who plays for Podbrezová of the Niké Liga as a winger.

== Club career ==
=== FC Košice ===
Miljanić made his professional Niké Liga debut for FC Košice against FC DAC 1904 Dunajská Streda on 28 July 2024, in a home fixture at the Košická futbalová aréna.
