= Vladimir Perišić =

Vladimir Perišić may refer to:

- Vladimir Perišić (film director) (born 1976), Serbian film director
- Vladimir Perišić (footballer), Montenegrin footballer
