= Gejza Pulen =

Former Slovak football goalkeeper

Personal information
- Date of birth: 19 May 1979 (age 47)
- Place of birth: Rožňava, Czechoslovakia
- Height: 1.91 m (6 ft 3 in)
- Position: Goalkeeper

Youth career
- FK Rožňava

Senior career*
Years	Team	Apps	(Gls)
	Rožňava	?	(?)
1998–1999	Slovmag Jelšava	19	(0)
1999–2002	Tatran Prešov	30	(0)
2002–2004	Jablonec 97	2	(0)
2004–2005	Steel Trans Ličartovce	?	(?)
2005–2009	MFK Košice	31	(0)
2007	→ Rimavská Sobota (loan)	?	(?)
2009–2010	→ Vranov nad Topľou (loan)	?	(?)
2010–2011	Karviná	2	(0)
2011–2012	Rimavská Sobota	4	(0)
2016–2018	Rožňava	56	(0)
2018–2020	FC Košice	35	(0)
- * Club domestic league appearances and goals as of 29 July 2020

Gejza Pulen (born 19 May 1979 in Rožňava) is a Slovak former football goalkeeper who played most of his career in leading clubs across eastern Slovakia. His first notable career stop was in 2. Liga playing for Slovmag Jelšava.

== Career statistics ==
Club	Season	Corgoň Liga		Slovak Cup		Europe		Total	
Club	Season	Pld	GA	Pld	GA	Pld	GA	Pld	GA
MFK Košice	2006/07	23	25	1	4	0	0	24	29
MFK Košice	2007/08	3	4	0	0	0	0	3	4
MFK Košice	2008/09	5	9	1	1	0	0	6	10
Total		31	38	2	5	0	0	33	43

^{Last updated: 9 June 2009}
