= Ján Krivák =

Slovak footballer

Personal information
- Full name: Ján Krivák
- Date of birth: 10 November 1993 (age 32)
- Place of birth: Vranov nad Topľou, Slovakia
- Height: 1.86 m (6 ft 1 in)
- Position: Centre-back

Team information
- Current team: Železiarne Podbrezová
- Number: 20

Youth career
- 2004–2013: Vranov nad Topľou
- 2010: → Zemplín Michalovce (loan)

Senior career*
| Years | Team | Apps | (Gls) |
| –2015 | Vranov nad Topľou | | |
| 2012 | → FK Soľ (loan) | | |
| 2013 | → Odeva Lipany (loan) | | |
| 2015 | SV Ferschnitz | | |
| 2016–2018 | Železiarne Podbrezová | 77 | (2) |
| 2018–2019 | Karviná | 34 | (0) |
| 2020–2022 | Shkëndija Tetovo | 54 | (5) |
| 2022–2026 | Košice | 75 | (2) |
| 2026- | Železiarne Podbrezová | 5 | (0) |

International career^{‡}
| 2017 | Slovakia | 1 | (0) |
- * Club domestic league appearances and goals as of 21 September 2026 ‡ National team caps and goals as of 12 January 2017

Ján Krivák (born 10 November 1993) is a Slovak footballer who plays as centre-back for Železiarne Podbrezová of the Niké Liga.

== Career ==
=== FO ŽP Šport Podbrezová ===
Krivák made his professional debut for ŽP Šport Podbrezová against Senica on 27 February 2016.

=== FC Košice ===
In June 2022, Krivák signed with Košice citing closeness to his hometown and family, following his release from Shkëndija Tetovo after 2.5 years with the club.

== International career ==
Krivák was called up for two unofficial friendly fixtures held in Abu Dhabi, UAE, in January 2017, against Uganda (1–3 loss) and Sweden. He made his debut against Sweden, being fielded in the 46th minute, when he substituted Dominik Kružliak. Slovakia went on to lose the game 0–6.

== Private life ==
Krivák originates from Vranov nad Topľou and lives in Košice. He has a son named Samuel and a daughter named Sára. In June 2025, he married his fiancée Dominika.
