= Miroslav Sovič =

Slovak footballer (born 1970)

Personal information
- Date of birth: 9 March 1970 (age 56)
- Place of birth: Košice, Czechoslovakia
- Height: 1.68 m (5 ft 6 in)
- Position: Midfielder

Team information
- Current team: Ružomberok B (manager)

Youth career
- 1978–1988: Lokomotíva Košice

Senior career*
Years	Team	Apps	(Gls)
1988–1989	Lokomotíva Košice	?	(?)
1989–1994	FC Nitra	112	(9)
1994–1995	FK Jablonec	5	(0)
1994–1995	Lokomotíva Košice	13	(1)
1995–1996	Dukla Banská Bystrica	13	(2)
1996–1998	1. FC Košice	76	(3)
1998–1999	Sparta Praha	10	(2)
1999–2001	Viktoria Žižkov	19	(0)
2001–2003	1. FC Košice	39	(3)
2003–2005	Dukla Banská Bystrica	38	(7)
2005–2006	Al-Shabab	?	(?)
2006–2007	MFK Košice	23	(1)

International career
1997–1998	Slovakia	12	(1)

Managerial career
- –: Vladimír Janočko academy
- 2017–2019: FC Košice
- 2019: FC Košice (assistant)
- 2023: FC Košice (interim)
- * Club domestic league appearances and goals

Miroslav Sovič (born 9 March 1970 in Košice) is a former Slovak footballer who played for Lokomotíva Košice, 1. FC Košice, FC Nitra, appearing in 5 league matches. Sparta Praha and he ended his career at MFK Košice. Sovič played for Slovakia 12 matches and scored one goal.

== Personal life ==
His son Miroslav jr. is also footballer, currently playing for 1st tier club FC Košice.
