= Giannis Niarchos =

Greek footballer

Personal information
- Full name: Ioannis Niarchos
- Date of birth: 26 June 2002 (age 24)
- Place of birth: Athens, Greece
- Height: 1.88 m (6 ft 2 in)
- Position: Striker

Team information
- Current team: Slovácko

Youth career
- 2013–2020: Panathinaikos
- 2020: Senica

Senior career*
Years	Team	Apps	(Gls)
2020–2022	Senica	33	(4)
2022	ViOn Zlaté Moravce	16	(5)
2023–2025	DAC Dunajská Streda	22	(0)
2024	→ Michalovce (loan)	12	(2)
2024–2025	→ FC Košice (loan)	28	(7)
2025–2026	Wisła Płock	20	(1)
2026–	Slovácko	0	(0)

International career
2017	Greece U16	3	(0)
2023–2024	Greece U21	10	(1)
- * Club domestic league appearances and goals as of 17:59, 29 May 2026 (UTC)

Giannis Niarchos (Greek: Γιάννης Νιάρχος, romanized: Yannis Niarchos; born 26 June 2002) is a Greek professional footballer who plays as a striker for Czech First League club Slovácko.

== Career ==
=== FC Košice ===
On 19 July 2024, FC Košice acquired Niarchos on a one-year loan, from DAC Dunajská Streda, with option to buy.

=== Wisła Płock ===
On 16 July 2025, Niarchos moved to Polish Ekstraklasa club Wisła Płock, signing a three-year contract.

=== Slovácko ===
On 8 July 2026, Niarchos was transferred to Czech First League club Slovácko.
