= Leonardo Lukačević =

Austrian footballer (born 1999)

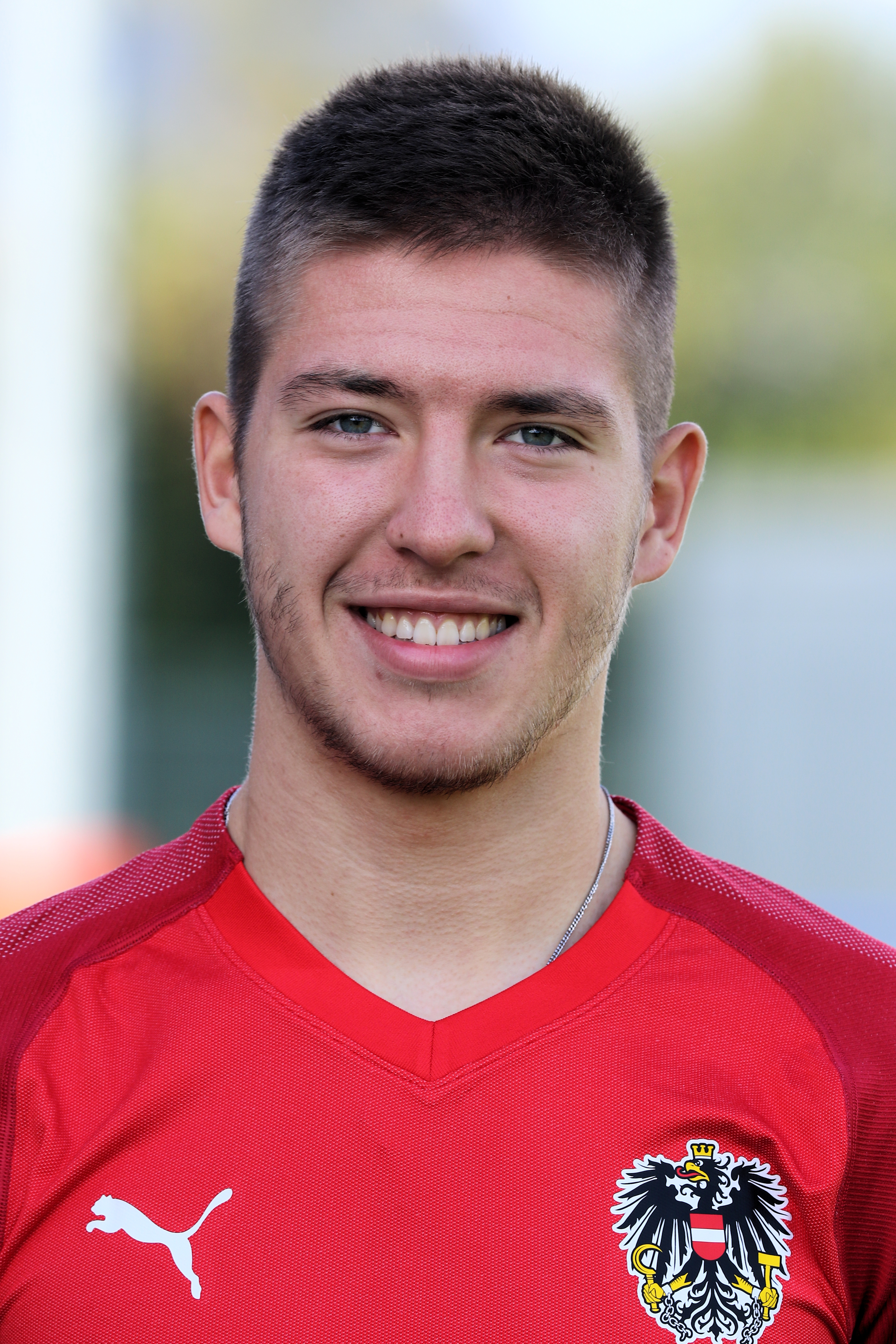
- Lukačević with Austria U21 in 2019

Personal information
- Date of birth: 21 January 1999 (age 27)
- Place of birth: Salzburg, Austria
- Height: 1.85 m (6 ft 1 in)
- Position: Left-back

Team information
- Current team: Košice
- Number: 47

Youth career
- 2005–2007: PSV Salzburg
- 2007–2014: Red Bull Salzburg
- 2014–2016: SV Grödig

Senior career*
Years	Team	Apps	(Gls)
2016–2019	SV Grödig	76	(4)
2019–2020	Admira Wacker II	2	(1)
2020–2023	Admira Wacker	76	(2)
2023–2025	Rheindorf Altach	48	(0)
2026–	Košice	14	(0)

International career^{‡}
2019	Austria U21	3	(0)
- * Club domestic league appearances and goals as of 21 September 2026 ‡ National team caps and goals as of 3 May 2020

Leonardo Lukačević (born 21 January 1999) is an Austrian professional footballer who plays as a left-back for Košice.

== Club career ==
Lukačević started his football career at PSV Salzburg. In February 2007, he moved to the youth academy of Red Bull Salzburg. Ahead of the 2014–15 season he joined to the youth department of SV Grödig.

He was promoted to the Grödig first team for the 2016–17 season, making his senior debut in the Austrian Regionalliga in July 2016, when he was in the starting eleven on the first matchday of the season against FC Kufstein. He scored his first Regionalliga goal in October 2016, opening the score in a 4–2 victory against SV Wörgl. In his first season in the first team, he made 28 appearances in which he scored one goal.

In the 2017–18 season, Lukačević made 20 appearances without scoring a goal. In the 2018–19 season, he made 28 appearances, scoring three goals. For the 2019–20 season, he moved to the reserve team of Austrian Bundesliga club Admira Wacker. In July 2019, he was included in the first-team squad for the first time for a match against Union Edelweiß Linz. He made his debut in the Bundesliga in August 2019, when he was in the starting eleven on the third matchday of the season against LASK.

In June 2020, Lukačević was signed on a permanent deal to the Admira first team and received a contract running until June 2023.

Before the 2023–24 season, Lukačević signed a two-year contract with Rheindorf Altach.

== International career ==
On 5 September 2019, Lukačević gained his first cap for the Austria under-21 team in a 2021 UEFA European Under-21 Championship qualifier against Andorra.

== Personal life ==
Lukačević was born in Austria, and is of Croatian descent.
