= Adam Goljan =

Slovak footballer

Personal information
- Full name: Adam Goljan
- Date of birth: 15 April 2001 (age 25)
- Place of birth: Žilina, Slovakia
- Height: 1.83 m (6 ft 0 in)
- Position: Forward

Team information
- Current team: Púchov
- Number: 10

Youth career
- 2011–2020: Žilina

Senior career*
Years	Team	Apps	(Gls)
2019–2021	Žilina B	25	(1)
2020–2021	Žilina	17	(1)
2022–2025	Sparta Prague B	48	(2)
2023–2025	Sparta Prague	2	(0)
2025	FC Košice	5	(0)
2026–	Púchov	13	(1)

International career^{‡}
2017	Slovakia U16	1	(0)
2019	Slovakia U18	1	(0)
2021–2024	Slovakia U21	13	(1)
- * Club domestic league appearances and goals as of 25 May 2026 ‡ National team caps and goals as of 14:43, 8 June 2022 (UTC)

Adam Goljan (born 15 April 2001) is a Slovak professional footballer who plays for Púchov as a forward.

== Club career ==
=== MŠK Žilina ===
Goljan made his Fortuna Liga debut for Žilina against ViOn Zlaté Moravce on 13 February 2021. He came on in the second half, replacing Patrik Iľko. The match resulted in a decisive 4:1 victory.

== Honours ==
=== Club ===
Sparta Prague

- Czech First League: 2022–23
