= Dávid Gallovič =

Slovak footballer

Personal information
- Full name: Dávid Gallovič
- Date of birth: 23 April 1996 (age 30)
- Place of birth: Poprad, Slovakia
- Height: 1.78 m (5 ft 10 in)
- Position: Midfielder

Team information
- Current team: FC Košice
- Number: 8

Youth career
- –2014: Poprad

Senior career*
Years	Team	Apps	(Gls)
2014–2020	Poprad	92	(3)
2020–2021	Senica	25	(0)
2021–	FC Košice (2018)	145	(11)
- * Club domestic league appearances and goals as of 21 September 2026

Dávid Gallovič (born 23 April 1996) is a Slovak footballer who plays for FC Košice in the Slovak First Football League as a midfielder.

== Club career ==
=== FK Senica ===
Gallovič made his Fortuna Liga debut for Senica against Dunajská Streda on 20 September 2020. Gallovič came on as a second half replacement for Edmund Addo in the second half fixture, with the score at 1:3. During Gallovič's stay, Senica narrowed the gap through former league top-scorer Tomáš Malec but soon after, DAC regained the two goal gap and set the final score at 2:4 through Eric Ramírez.
