= Miroslav Sovič (footballer, born 2004) =

Slovak footballer

Personal information
- Full name: Miroslav Sovič
- Date of birth: 12 May 2004 (age 22)
- Place of birth: Slovakia
- Height: 1.78 m (5 ft 10 in)
- Position: Midfielder

Team information
- Current team: FC Košice
- Number: 15

Youth career
- VSS Košice
- 2015–2023: FC Košice

Senior career*
Years	Team	Apps	(Gls)
2021−	FC Košice	63	(3)
2024	→ Tatran Prešov (loan)	9	(1)

International career^{‡}
2022	Slovakia U19	2	(0)
- * Club domestic league appearances and goals as of 21 September 2026 ‡ National team caps and goals as of 25 May 2022

Miroslav Sovič (born 12 May 2004) is a Slovak footballer who plays for FC Košice as a midfielder.

== Club career ==
=== FC Košice ===
Sovič made his professional Niké Liga debut for FC Košice against ŠK Slovan Bratislava on 29 July 2023, in a home fixture at Košická futbalová aréna.

=== Personal life ===
His father Miroslav was also footballer.
