= Marek Zsigmund =

Slovak footballer

Personal information
- Full name: Marek Zsigmund
- Date of birth: 20 April 1997 (age 29)
- Place of birth: Ružomberok, Slovakia
- Height: 1.74 m (5 ft 9 in)
- Position: Midfielder

Team information
- Current team: FC Košice
- Number: 25

Youth career
- –2016: Ružomberok

Senior career*
Years	Team	Apps	(Gls)
2016−2019	Ružomberok B	55	(13)
2016−2017	→ Liptovský Hrádok (loan)	16	(1)
2019−2024	Ružomberok	99	(2)
2024−	FC Košice	46	(0)

International career
2012	Slovakia U16	1	(0)
- * Club domestic league appearances and goals as of 21 September 2026

Marek Zsigmund (born 20 April 1997) is a Slovak professional footballer who plays for FC Košice as a midfielder.

== Club career ==
=== MFK Ružomberok ===
Zsigmund made his Fortuna Liga debut for Ružomberok against iClinic Sereď on 6 April 2019, in a 0:1 away win. In the match, he replaced Štefan Gerec in stoppage time.
