= Matej Jakúbek =

Slovak footballer

Personal information
- Full name: Matej Jakúbek
- Date of birth: 19 January 1995 (age 31)
- Place of birth: Považská Bystrica, Slovakia
- Height: 1.86 m (6 ft 1 in)
- Position: Defensive midfielder

Team information
- Current team: Košice
- Number: 13

Youth career
- Považská Bystrica
- 2010–2012: Dubnica

Senior career*
Years	Team	Apps	(Gls)
2012–2013	Dubnica	28	(1)
2013–2016	Slovan Bratislava	6	(0)
2014	→ Dunajská Streda (loan)	3	(0)
2016–2018	Nová Dubnica		
2017–2018	→ Dubnica (loan)		
2018–2019	Dubnica	28	(6)
2019–2020	Spartak Trnava	6	(0)
2020	→ Dubnica (loan)	7	(2)
2020–2023	Košice	75	(15)
2025–	Košice	33	(3)

International career
	Slovakia U17	3	(0)
2013	Slovakia U19	3	(1)
- * Club domestic league appearances and goals as of 25 May 2026

Matej Jakúbek (born 19 January 1995) is a Slovak footballer who plays as a defensive midfielder for Košice.

== Club career ==
Jakúbek was signed by Spartak Trnava in June 2019. In 2023, Jakúbek was banned for 2.5 years for alleged efforts to influence the result of a match in a 2. Liga title race.
