= Gejza Farkaš =

Slovak footballer (born 1949)

Personal information
- Date of birth: 13 March 1949 (age 76)
- Place of birth: Slovakia
- Position(s): Midfielder

Senior career*
Years	Team	Apps	(Gls)
1969–1984	FC Lokomotíva Košice	335	(71)
1984–1986	AEL Limassol		(11)
- *Club domestic league appearances and goals

Gejza Farkaš (born 13 March 1949) is a Slovak former football manager and footballer.

== Early life ==
He was born in 1949 in Slovakia. He is a native of Rožňava, Slovakia.

== Playing career ==
He started his career with Slovak side FC Lokomotíva Košice. In 1984, he signed for Cypriot side AEL Limassol.

== Managerial career ==
He managed Slovak side FK Spišská Nová Ves. He was described as helping the club "made a solid name for themselves in the autumn part of the 2nd league" during the 2017/18 season.

== Personal life ==
He almos retired from professional football at the age of thirty-five.
