= Kendice =

Village and municipality in Prešov District in Slovakia

- Municipality
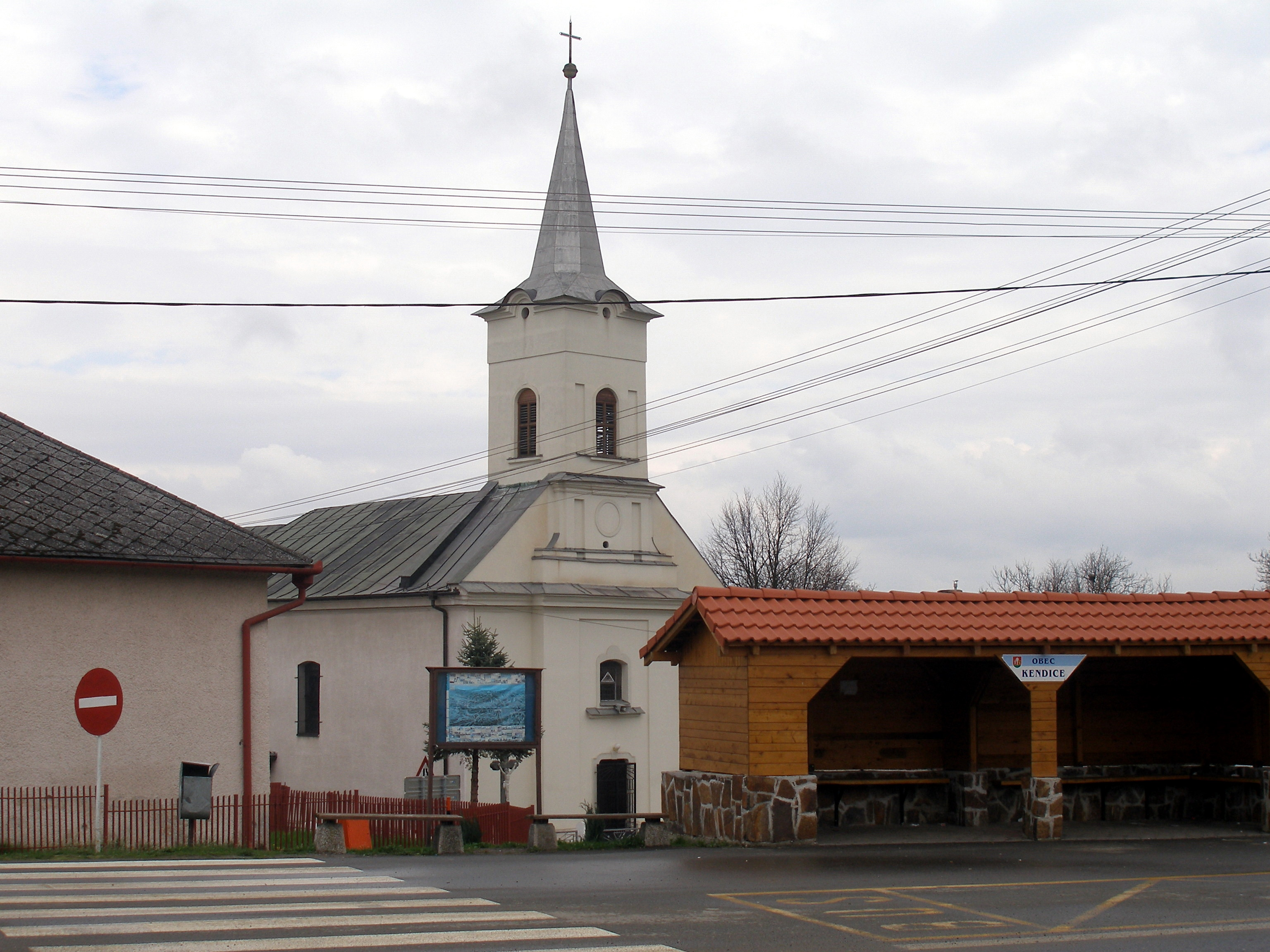

- Flag

- Location of Kendice in the Prešov Region Location of Kendice in Slovakia
- Coordinates: 48.92°N 21.25°E
- Country: Slovakia
- Region: Prešov Region
- District: Prešov District
- First mentioned: 1249

Area
  - Total: 9.34 km^{2} (3.61 sq mi)
- Elevation: 236 m (774 ft)

Population (2025)
  - Total: 2,103
- Time zone: UTC+1 (CET)
  - Summer (DST): UTC+2 (CEST)
- Postal code: 820 1
- Area code: +421 51
- Vehicle registration plate (until 2022): PO
- Website: www.kendice.eu

Kendice (Hungarian: Kende) is a village and municipality in Prešov District in the Prešov Region of eastern Slovakia.

== History ==
In historical records the village was first mentioned in 1249.

== Geography ==
The municipality lies at an altitude of 236 metres (774 ft) and covers an area of 9.34 km^{2} (3.61 sq mi) (2025).

== Population ==
Population statistic (10 years)
Year	1995	2005	2015	2025
Count	1445	1681	1960	2103
Difference		+16.33%	+16.59%	+7.29%

Population statistic
Year	2024	2025
Count	2082	2103
Difference		+1.00%

It has a population of 2103 people (31 December 2025).

=== Ethnicity ===
Census 2021 (1+ %)
Ethnicity	Number	Fraction
Slovak	1776	88.27%
Romani	231	11.48%
Not found out	117	5.81%
Total	2012	

In year 2021 was 2012 people by ethnicity 1776 as Slovak, 231 as Romani, 117 as Not found out, 15 as Rusyn, 4 as Czech, 3 as Polish, 3 as Hungarian, 2 as Ukrainian, 1 as Romanian, 1 as German and 1 as Bulgarian.

Note on population: The difference values of population numbers in the table "Population statistic" and in the sections "Ethnicity" & "Religion" is caused by the use of various statistical methods.

=== Religion ===
Census 2021 (1+ %)
Religion	Number	Fraction
Roman Catholic Church	1452	72.17%
None	260	12.92%
Apostolic Church	107	5.32%
Not found out	105	5.22%
Greek Catholic Church	50	2.49%
Total	2012	

In year 2021 was 2012 people by religion 1452 from Roman Catholic Church, 260 from None, 107 from Apostolic Church, 105 from Not found out, 50 from Greek Catholic Church, 14 from Evangelical Church, 7 from Other and not ascertained christian church, 6 from Eastern Orthodox Church, 4 from Christian Congregations in Slovakia, 2 from Paganism and natural spirituality, 1 from Calvinist Church, 1 from Seventh-day Adventist Church, 1 from Church of Jesus Christ of Latter-day Saints, 1 from Buddhism and 1 from Ad hoc movements.

== Genealogical resources ==
The records for genealogical research are available at the state archive "Statny Archiv in Presov, Slovakia":

- Roman Catholic church records (births/marriages/deaths): 1789–1895 (parish A)
- Greek Catholic church records (births/marriages/deaths): 1812–1904 (parish B)

== See also ==
- List of municipalities and towns in Slovakia
