= Sebastian Kóša =

Slovak footballer (born 2003)

Personal information
- Date of birth: 13 September 2003 (age 23)
- Place of birth: Nové Zámky, Slovakia
- Height: 1.90 m (6 ft 3 in)
- Position: Centre-back

Team information
- Current team: Košice (on loan from Zaragoza)
- Number: 26

Youth career
- 2008–2010: FC Komjatice
- 2010–2011: Slovan Nitra-Chrenová
- 2011–2016: ViOn Zlaté Moravce
- 2016–2020: Nitra

Senior career*
Years	Team	Apps	(Gls)
2020	Nitra	5	(1)
2020−2024	Spartak Trnava	94	(3)
2024−	Zaragoza	4	(0)
2026–	→ Košice (loan)	19	(1)

International career^{‡}
2017−2018	Slovakia U15	4	(0)
2019−2020	Slovakia U17	6	(0)
2021	Slovakia U18	2	(0)
2021–2022	Slovakia U19	5	(0)
2022–2023	Slovakia U20	7	(0)
2021−2025	Slovakia U21	12	(0)
2024−	Slovakia	1	(0)
- * Club domestic league appearances and goals as of 21 September 2026 ‡ National team caps and goals as of 13 January 2026

Sebastian Kóša (born 13 September 2003) is a Slovak professional footballer who plays as a centre-back for Košice, on loan from Spanish club Real Zaragoza.

== Club career ==
=== Nitra ===
Kóša made his professional Fortuna Liga debut for Nitra against ViOn Zlaté Moravce on 13 June 2020.

=== Spartak Trnava ===
Kóša joined Spartak Trnava on 18 July 2020. He scored his first league goal against AS Trenčín the same year on 25 October, breaking Josef Adamec's record as Spartak Trnava's youngest goalscorer at the age of 17 years, 1 month, and 11 days. In February 2022, Kóša was named the Best Player of Slovakia in the U19 category at Grassroots Football Gala hosted by the Slovak Football Association.

=== Real Zaragoza ===
On 24 August 2024, Kóša signed a four-year contract with Spanish Segunda División side Real Zaragoza, becoming their tenth signing of the transfer window. Initially kept out of the starting line-up, Kóša only made a substitute appearance before fellow central defender Lluís López was suspended after receiving a red card, leading to his first start in October 2024. He made just two league starts for the club before sustaining an ankle fracture in a Copa del Rey match against L'Hospitalet at the end of the same month.

==== Košice (loan) ====
Following injuries and lack of game time, it was announced that Kóša would be returning to Slovakia to join FC Košice of a half-year loan.

== International career ==
At the age of 17 in 2021, Kóša became the youngest player of the Slovakia U21 national team, playing the full match against Lithuania and Northern Ireland.

In December 2022, Kóša received his first call-up to the Slovakia senior national team for a training camp at NTC Senec. His senior international debut came on 23 March 2024, coming on as a substitute in a 0–2 friendly loss to Austria. He was later named in Slovakia's UEFA Euro 2024 squad.

== Career statistics ==
=== Club ===
As of matches played on 29 October 2025

Appearances and goals by club, season and competition
Club	Season	League			National cup (Note: Includes Slovak Cup, Copa del Rey)		Continental		Other		Total	
Club	Season	Division	Apps	Goals	Apps	Goals	Apps	Goals	Apps	Goals	Apps	Goals
Nitra	2019–20	Slovak 1. liga	3	0	0	0	—		2 (Note: Appearance(s) in Promotion/Relegation play-offs)	1	5	1
Spartak Trnava	2020–21	Slovak 1. liga	18	1	1	0	—		—		19	1
Spartak Trnava	2021–22	Slovak 1. liga	20	0	4	1	5 (Note: Appearance(s) in UEFA Europa Conference League)	0	—		29	1
Spartak Trnava	2022–23	Slovak 1. liga	27	2	6	1	2	0	—		35	3
Spartak Trnava	2023–24	Slovak 1. liga	25	0	5	0	12	1	—		42	1
Spartak Trnava	2024–25	Slovak 1. liga	4	0	0	0	4	0	—		8	0
Spartak Trnava	Total		94	3	16	2	23	1	0	0	133	6
Zaragoza	2024–25	Segunda División	4	0	1	0	—		—		5	0
Zaragoza	2025–26	Segunda División	0	0	1	0	—		—		1	0
Zaragoza	Total		4	0	2	0	—		—		6	0
Career total			101	3	18	2	23	1	2	1	144	7

=== International ===
As of match played 23 March 2024

Appearances and goals by national team and year
National team	Year	Apps	Goals
Slovakia	2024	1	0
Total		1	0

== Honours ==
Spartak Trnava

- Slovak Cup: 2021–22, 2022–23

Individual

- Slovak Super Liga U-21 Team of the Season: 2021–22
