= Daniel Magda =

Slovak footballer

Personal information
- Date of birth: 25 November 1997 (age 28)
- Place of birth: Prešov, Slovakia
- Height: 1.82 m (6 ft 0 in)
- Position: Left-back

Team information
- Current team: FC Košice
- Number: 21

Youth career
- 2007–2008: TJ Družstevník Víťaz
- 2008–2013: Tatran Prešov
- 2013–2015: ŽP Šport Podbrezová

Senior career*
Years	Team	Apps	(Gls)
2015–2021	Železiarne Podbrezová	20	(0)
2019	→ Fluminense Šamorín (loan)	9	(0)
2019–2020	→ Nitra (loan)	40	(0)
2021	→ Zemplín Michalovce (loan)	14	(0)
2021–2024	Zemplín Michalovce	99	(2)
2024–	FC Košice	52	(0)
- * Club domestic league appearances and goals as of 21 September 2026

Daniel Magda (born 25 November 1997) is a Slovak footballer who plays as defender for Slovak club FC Košice.

== Career ==
=== Železiarne Podbrezová ===
Magda made his professional debut for ŽP Šport Podbrezová against Ružomberok on 30 April 2016. Magda was fielded in a stoppage time, replacing Matúš Turňa. Podbrezová won 3-1.
