= Matej Madleňák =

Slovak footballer

Personal information
- Full name: Matej Madleňák
- Date of birth: 7 February 1999 (age 27)
- Place of birth: Oravská Jasenica, Slovakia
- Height: 1.86 m (6 ft 1 in)
- Position: Defender

Team information
- Current team: FC Košice
- Number: 23

Youth career
- 2006–2013: Oravan Oravská Jasenica
- 2013–2023: Ružomberok

Senior career*
Years	Team	Apps	(Gls)
2018−2020	Ružomberok B	23	(2)
2018−2025	Ružomberok	122	(12)
2023−2024	→ Baník Ostrava (loan)	5	(0)
2024	→ České Budějovice (loan)	4	(0)
2025–	FC Košice	31	(4)

International career^{‡}
2017	Slovakia U18	8	(0)
2017	Slovakia U19	0	(0)
- * Club domestic league appearances and goals as of 21 September 2026 ‡ National team caps and goals as of 13 November 2017

Matej Madleňák (born 7 February 1999) is a Slovak professional footballer who plays for FC Košice as a defender.

== Club career ==
=== MFK Ružomberok ===
Madleňák made his Fortuna Liga debut for Ružomberok against AS Trenčín on 29 July 2018.

On 22 February 2024, Ružomberok loaned Madleňák to Czech club České Budějovice on a half-year loan without option to make transfer permanent.

== International career ==
Madleňák was first recognised in Slovak senior national team nomination in November 2022 by Francesco Calzona being listed as an alternate for two friendly fixtures against Montenegro and Marek Hamšík's retirement game against Chile. He remained in the same position for December prospective national team players' training camp.

== Honours ==
Individual

- Slovak Super Liga Team of the Season: 2021–22
