= Emilian Metu =

Austrian footballer (born 2003)

Personal information
- Full name: Emilian Metu
- Date of birth: 18 April 2003 (age 23)
- Place of birth: Wiener Neustadt, Austria
- Height: 1.91 m (6 ft 3 in)
- Position: Midfielder

Team information
- Current team: FC Košice
- Number: 31

Youth career
- 2010–2016: Haidbrunn-Wacker Wiener Neustadt
- 2016–2020: AKA St. Pölten
- 2021–2022: Bayern Munich

Senior career*
Years	Team	Apps	(Gls)
2020–2021	SKN St. Pölten II	4	(0)
2021	SKN St. Pölten	3	(0)
2021–2023	Bayern Munich II	34	(5)
2022–2023	→ Austria Klagenfurt (loan)	1	(0)
2022–2023	→ Austria Klagenfurt II (loan)	20	(1)
2023–2025	SV Horn	44	(1)
2025–	FC Košice	15	(0)

International career
2018–2019	Austria U16	6	(0)
2019	Austria U17	5	(0)
2021	Austria U18	1	(0)
2021–2022	Austria U19	6	(1)
- * Club domestic league appearances and goals as of 25 May 2026

Emilian Metu (born 18 April 2003) is an Austrian professional footballer who plays as a midfielder for Slovak First Football League team FC Košice.

== Club career ==
Metu spent his youth career with local team Haidbrunn-Wacker Wiener Neustadt and AKA St. Pölten. In September 2020, Austrian Bundesliga club SKN St. Pölten announced the signing of Metu on a two-year deal with option to extend for a further year. He initially played for club's reserve side in 1. Niederösterreichische Landesliga – fourth tier of Austrian football league system. He made his professional debut on 10 February 2021 in a 1–3 league defeat against LASK. This made him second youngest Bundesliga player in club history, only behind Markus Siedl.

On 2 March 2021, Bayern Munich announced that Metu have signed a contract with the club until June 2025. He is initially planned for the reserve side and will join the club ahead of 2021–2022 season.

In July 2025 Slovak outfit FC Košice announced signing Metu as a free agent after successful trial.

== International career ==
Metu was born in Austria to a Nigerian father and Austrian mother. He is a current Austrian youth international.

== Career statistics ==
As of match played on 21 July 2025

Appearances and goals by club, season and competition
Club	Season	League			Cup		Continental		Total	
Club	Season	Division	Apps	Goals	Apps	Goals	Apps	Goals	Apps	Goals
SKN St. Pölten II	2020–21	1. Niederösterreichische Landesliga	4	0	—		—		4	0
SKN St. Pölten	2020–21	Austrian Bundesliga	3	0	0	0	—		3	0
Bayern Munich II	2021–22	Regionalliga Bayern	28	4	—				28	4
Bayern Munich II	2022–23	Regionalliga Bayern	6	1	—				6	1
Bayern Munich II	Total		34	5	—		—		34	5
Austria Klagenfurt (loan)	2022–23	Austrian Bundesliga	1	0	0	0	—		1	0
Austria Klagenfurt II (loan)	2022–23	Kärntner Liga	19	1	0	0	—		19	1
SV Horn	2023–24	2. Liga	2	0	1	0	—		3	0
Career total			63	6	0	0	—		64	6
