= Dominik Kružliak =

Slovak footballer

Personal information
- Date of birth: 10 July 1996 (age 30)
- Place of birth: Liptovský Mikuláš, Slovakia
- Height: 1.85 m (6 ft 1 in)
- Position: Centre-back

Team information
- Current team: FC Košice
- Number: 24

Youth career
- 2005–2008: FC 34 Liptovský Mikuláš - Palúdzka
- 2008–2014: Ružomberok

Senior career*
Years	Team	Apps	(Gls)
2014–2019	Ružomberok	134	(10)
2019–2023	DAC Dunajská Streda	105	(7)
2023	Volos	3	(0)
2023–	FC Košice	67	(2)

International career^{‡}
2014	Slovakia U18	3	(0)
2014–2015	Slovakia U19	8	(2)
2017	Slovakia U21	4	(0)
2017	Slovakia	1	(0)
- * Club domestic league appearances and goals as of 21 September 2026 ‡ National team caps and goals as of 12 January 2017

Dominik Kružliak (born 10 July 1996) is a Slovak professional footballer who plays as a centre-back for FC Košice.

== Club career ==
=== Ružomberok ===
Kružliak made his Fortuna Liga debut for Ružomberok against ViOn Zlaté Moravce on 29 March 2014, entering in as a substitute in place of injured Lukáš Greššák in the 59th minute of the match. ViOn however went on to defeat Ružomberok 1–0.

=== Volos ===
On 19 June 2023, he signed a contract with Volos on a free transfer.

On 5 September 2023, on the aftermath of Volos' 3–2 loss to AEK Athens, the club terminated his contract as he was thought responsible for the loss after conceding a penalty in stoppage time, converted by Nordin Amrabat.

Three days later, he returned to Slovakia to sign a two-year deal with FC Košice.

== International career ==
Kružliak was first called up for Slovakia national team for two unofficial friendly fixtures in January 2017, in Abu Dhabi, UAE, against Uganda (1–3 loss) and Sweden. He made his debut on 12 January against Sweden, however he only played the first half of the match. Slovakia lost the game 0–6.

== Career statistics ==
As of 6 September 2023

Club	Season	League			National cup		Continental		Other		Total	
Club	Season	Division	Apps	Goals	Apps	Goals	Apps	Goals	Apps	Goals	Apps	Goals
Ružomberok	2013–14	Slovak First League	9	0	2	0	—		—		11	0
Ružomberok	2014–15	Slovak First League	26	1	0	0	—		—		26	1
Ružomberok	2015–16	Slovak First League	26	2	2	0	—		—		28	2
Ružomberok	2016–17	Slovak First League	32	1	3	0	—		—		35	1
Ružomberok	2017–18	Slovak First League	19	5	3	2	5	1	—		27	8
Ružomberok	2018–19	Slovak First League	22	1	1	0	—		—		23	1
Ružomberok	Total		134	10	11	2	5	1	—		150	13
DAC Dunajská Streda	2019–20	Slovak First League	25	1	7	1	4	0	—		36	2
DAC Dunajská Streda	2020–21	Slovak First League	30	1	1	1	3	0	—		34	2
DAC Dunajská Streda	2021–22	Slovak First League	25	3	0	0	2	0	—		27	3
DAC Dunajská Streda	2022–23	Slovak First League	25	2	1	0	5	0	—		31	2
DAC Dunajská Streda	Total		105	7	9	2	14	0	—		128	9
Volos	2023–24	Super League Greece	3	0	0	0	—		—		3	0
Career total			242	17	20	4	19	1	0	0	281	22
