= Vladimir Perišić (footballer) =

Montenegrin footballer (born 2004)

Personal information
- Date of birth: 26 August 2004 (age 22)
- Place of birth: Podgorica, Montenegro
- Height: 1.87 m (6 ft 2 in)
- Position: Centre-forward

Team information
- Current team: Artis Brno

Youth career
- –2022: Budućnost Podgorica

Senior career*
Years	Team	Apps	(Gls)
2022–2024	Budućnost Podgorica	42	(3)
2023–2024	→ Kom (loan)	30	(22)
2024–2026	Slavia Prague	0	(0)
2024–2025	Slavia Prague B	14	(6)
2025–2026	→ Košice (loan)	23	(5)
2026–	Artis Brno	0	(0)

International career^{‡}
2019	Montenegro U16	4	(0)
2020	Montenegro U17	8	(1)
2021	Montenegro U19	7	(1)
2024–	Montenegro U21	12	(2)
- * Club domestic league appearances and goals as of 15 May 2026 ‡ National team caps and goals as of 10:03, 15 May 2026 (UTC)

Vladimir Perišić (born 26 August 2004) is a Montenegrin professional footballer who plays as a centre-forward for Czech First League club Artis Brno.

== Early life ==
Perišič started his football career at the Montenegrin club Buducnost Podgorica, where he went through the youth categories. His mother played volleyball for OK Budućnost Podgorica, and his father Goran is a legendary player of the club.

== Club career ==
=== Slavia Prague ===
In the summer of 2024, Perišić signed a four-year contract with Czech club Slavia Prague. Slovak club DAC Dunajska Streda had also tried to sign him. Perišić spent his first season with the team in the second league, playing for Slavia Prague B. He made his first appearance on 17 September 2024 against Zlín, and after nine minutes on the field, he scored his first goal in the Slavia jersey. He continued his good form by scoring one goal each against Líšen, Olomouc B and Viktoria Žižkov. He also scored two goals against the Baník Ostrava reserve team.

==== Loan to FC Košice ====
On 17 July 2025, it was announced that Perišić would be joining Slovak First Football League side FC Košice on a season-long loan. He made his debut for the club in the second qualifying round of the UEFA Conference League against FC Neman Grodno, playing 63 minutes of the 3–2 defeat. Perišić also played in the second leg, a 1–1 draw, which saw the club getting knock out of the competition. He made his league debut in a 3–1 loss to FK Železiarne Podbrezová, playing the full match. He assisted two goals in the next two matches against MFK Ružomberok and Slovan Bratislava. Perišić scored his first league goal for Košice in a 3–1 defeat against Spartak Trnava, opening the scoreline in the 20th minute.

=== Artis Brno ===
On 8 September 2026, Perišić signed a two-year contract with Czech First League club Artis Brno.

== International career ==
Perišić is also a member of the Montenegro youth team. He made his debut for the Montenegrin national team in August 2019, playing the first half of a match against Indonesia for the U16 team. He scored his first goal for the Montenegrin national team in the U17 team, converting his chance against Bosnia on 6 October 2020.
