= Milan Dimun =

Slovak footballer

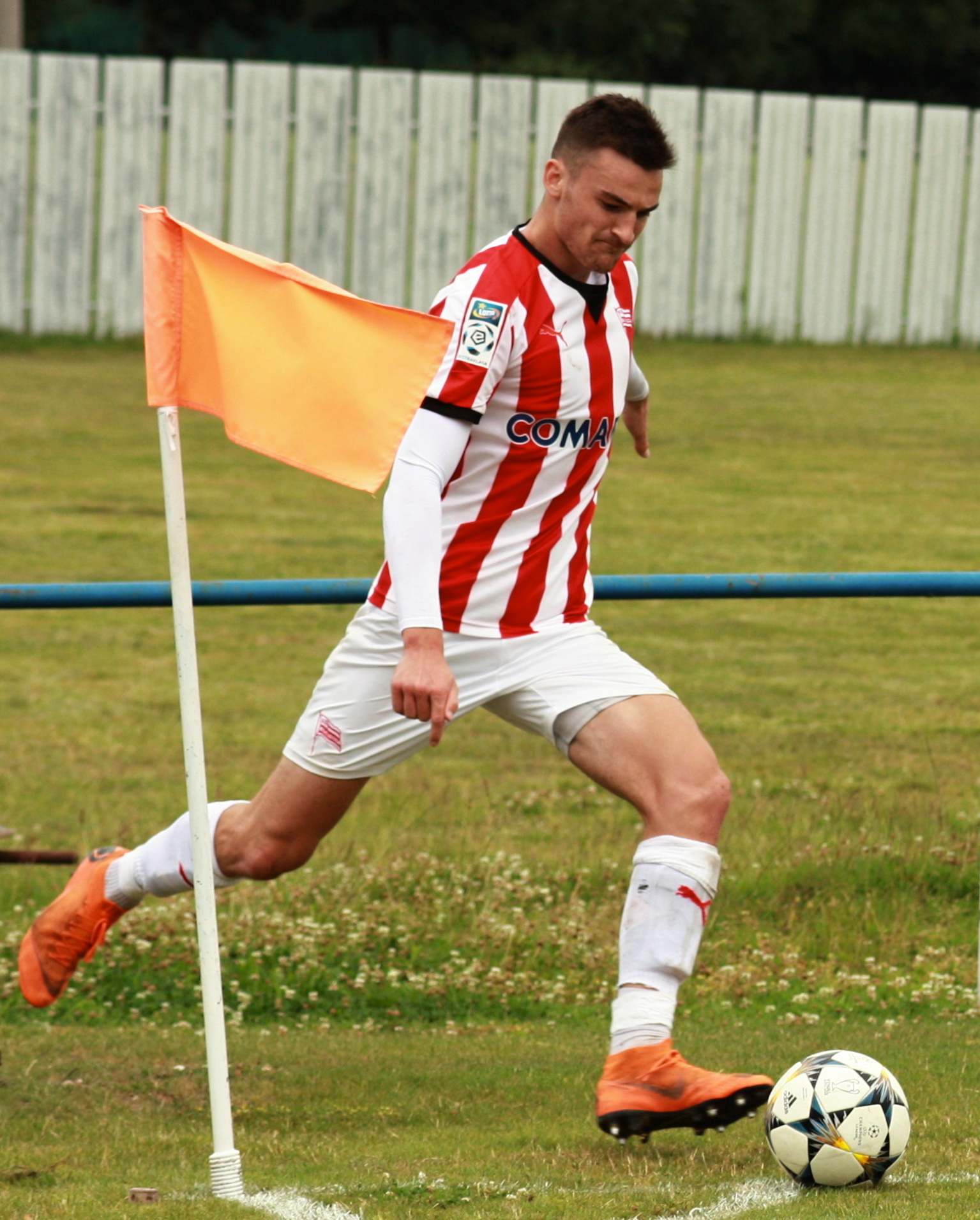
- Dimun in 2018

Personal information
- Date of birth: 19 September 1996 (age 30)
- Place of birth: Košice, Slovakia
- Height: 1.88 m (6 ft 2 in)
- Position: Midfielder

Team information
- Current team: FC Košice
- Number: 7

Youth career
- Košice

Senior career*
Years	Team	Apps	(Gls)
2015–2016	Košice	40	(6)
2016–2021	Cracovia	106	(4)
2021–2025	DAC Dunajská Streda	102	(5)
2025–	FC Košice	22	(1)

International career
2013	Slovakia U17	1	(0)
2014	Slovakia U18	1	(0)
2015	Slovakia U19	1	(0)
2018	Slovakia U21	3	(1)
- * Club domestic league appearances and goals as of 21 September 2026

Milan Dimun (born 19 September 1996) is a Slovak professional footballer who plays as a midfielder for Niké Liga club FC Košice.

== Club career ==
=== MFK Košice ===
Dimun made his professional Fortuna Liga debut for Košice on 18 October 2014 against ViOn Zlaté Moravce.

=== Cracovia ===
On 10 June 2016, Dimun signed a four-year deal with Cracovia.

== Honours ==
Cracovia

- Polish Cup: 2019–20
- Polish Super Cup: 2020
