= Košická futbalová aréna =

Football stadium in Košice, Slovakia

KFA - Košická futbalová Aréna
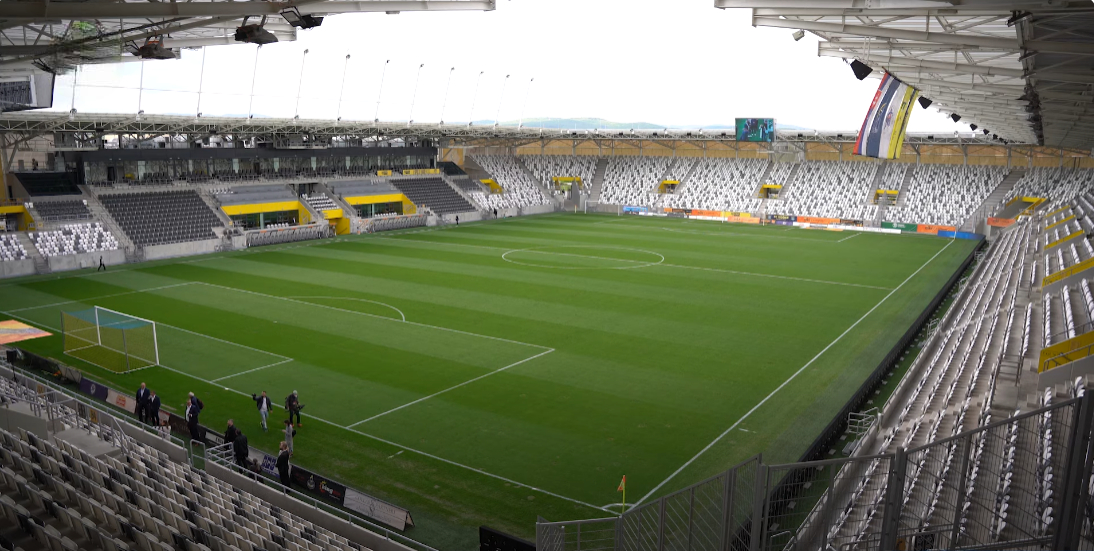
- UEFA
- Interactive map of KFA - Košická futbalová Aréna
- Location: Pri prachárni 6, Košice, Slovakia
- Coordinates: 48°41′48″N 21°14′42″E
- Owner: City of Košice
- Operator: Košická Futbalová Aréna a.s.
- Capacity: 12,555
- Surface: Grass
- Field size: 105 x 68 m

Construction
- Groundbreaking: 2018 (first phase); 2023 (second phase)
- Opened: 2022
- Expanded: 2023–2024
- Cost: €22.5 million (2020–2022)
- Architect: HESCON

Tenants
- FC Košice (2022–present); SC Dnipro-1 (2022–2024) European games UEFA U-21 Championship (2025)

Website
- https://kosickafutbalovaarena.sk/

Košická futbalová aréna (KFA) is a football stadium in Košice, Slovakia. It is the home ground of a local club FC Košice and has an all-seated capacity of 12,555.

== History ==
The stadium replaced old stadium Všešportový areál, which was demolished in 2011. The construction is divided into three phases. First phase was started in 2018 and finished in 2021 with two stands and capacity 5,836 seats. The second and third phases, with another two stands, aimed to be finished in 2022 and would bring the total capacity of the ground to 12,658 and help it achieve UEFA's 4 stars standard. Construction cost €22.5 million. The city of Košice provided €13.5 million, while the Government of Slovakia provided the remaining €9 million.

Ukrainian club Dnipro-1 played their five Europa League qualifying and Europa Conference League fixtures in KFA due to UEFA regulations related to the Russian invasion of Ukraine.

In June 2025 it hosts the 2025 UEFA European Under-21 Championship.

== Milestone matches ==
Match	Home	Result	Opponent	Date	Competition	Attendance
First match	(Slovakia) FC Košice	2–0	(Slovakia) Slavoj Trebišov	12 February 2022	Friendly match	Behind closed doors
First league match	(Slovakia) FC Košice	4–0	(Slovakia) Rohožník	25 February 2022	2021–22 2. Liga (Slovakia)	1,289
First Europa League qualifying match	(Ukraine) Dnipro-1	1–2	(Cyprus) AEK Larnaca	18 August 2022	2022–23 UEFA Europa League	3,450
First Europa Conference League group stage match	(Ukraine) Dnipro-1	0–1	(Netherlands) AZ	8 September 2022	2022–23 UEFA Europa Conference League	3,347
First match with VAR availability	(Ukraine) Dnipro-1	0–0	(Cyprus) AEK Larnaca	23 February 2023	2022–23 UEFA Europa Conference League	3,527
First match in Niké Liga (Slovak Top Tier)	(Slovakia) FC Košice	0–0	(Slovakia) ŠK Slovan Bratislava	29 July 2023	Niké Liga	5836
Ceremonial Match for Opening KFA	(Slovakia) FC Košice	1–1	(Italy) AS Roma	22 June 2024	Friendly match	12 050

== International matches ==
KFA has hosted 3 competitive and 1 friendly match of the Slovakia national team

8 September 2024 2024–25 UEFA Nations League	Slovakia	2–0	Azerbaijan	Košice, Slovakia
18:00	Duda 22' (pen.); Strelec 26'	Report		Stadium: Košická futbalová aréna Attendance: 11,435; Referee: Damian Sylwestrzak (Poland)

14 November 2025 2026 FIFA World Cup qualification	Slovakia	1–0	Northern Ireland	Košice, Slovakia
20:45		Report		Stadium: Košická futbalová aréna

5 June 2026 Friendly	Slovakia	2–2	Montenegro	Košice, Slovakia
18:30 UTC+2	Boženík 6'; Duda 74'	Report	Osmajić 44', 66' (pen.)	Stadium: Košická futbalová aréna Attendance: 10,432; Referee: Wojciech Myć (Poland)

13 November 2026 2026–27 Nations League	Slovakia	2–2	Faroe Islands	Košice, Slovakia
20:45 UTC+1	Prekop 17'; Haraslín 74'	Report	Davidsen 30'; Samuelsen 47' (pen.)	Stadium: Košická futbalová aréna Attendance: 11,013; Referee: Mohammad Al-Emara (Finland)

== Construction Image gallery ==
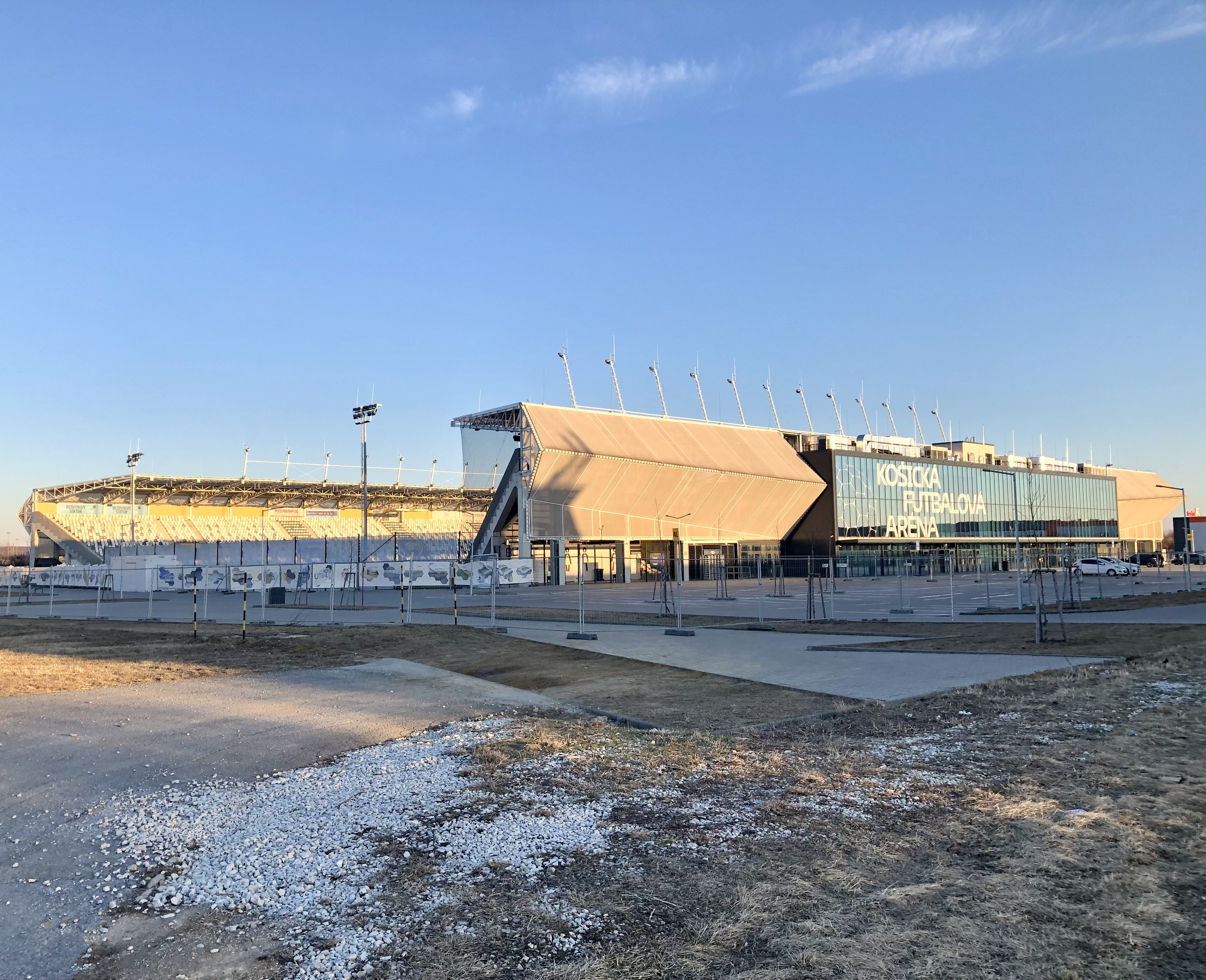

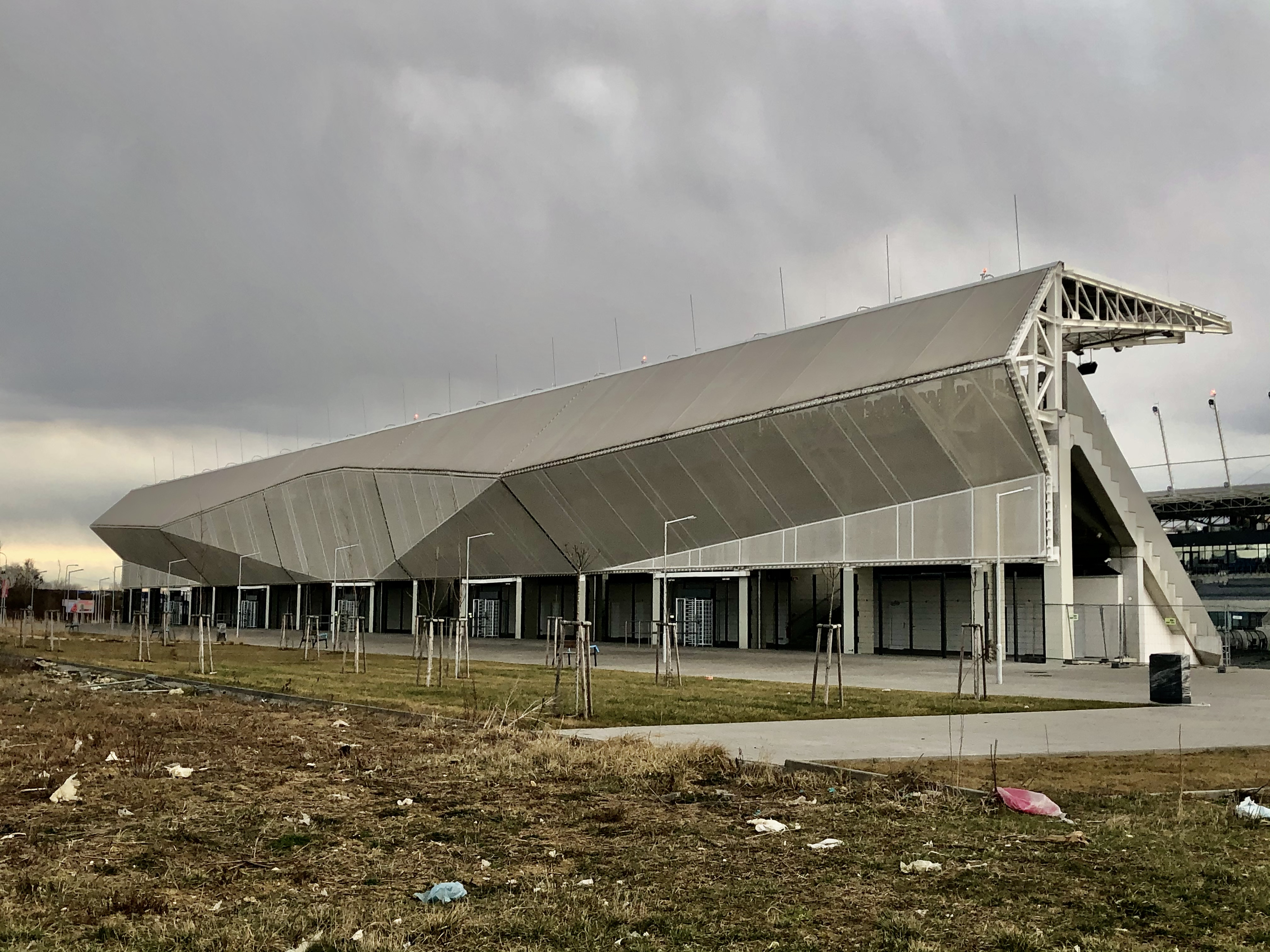
Side view

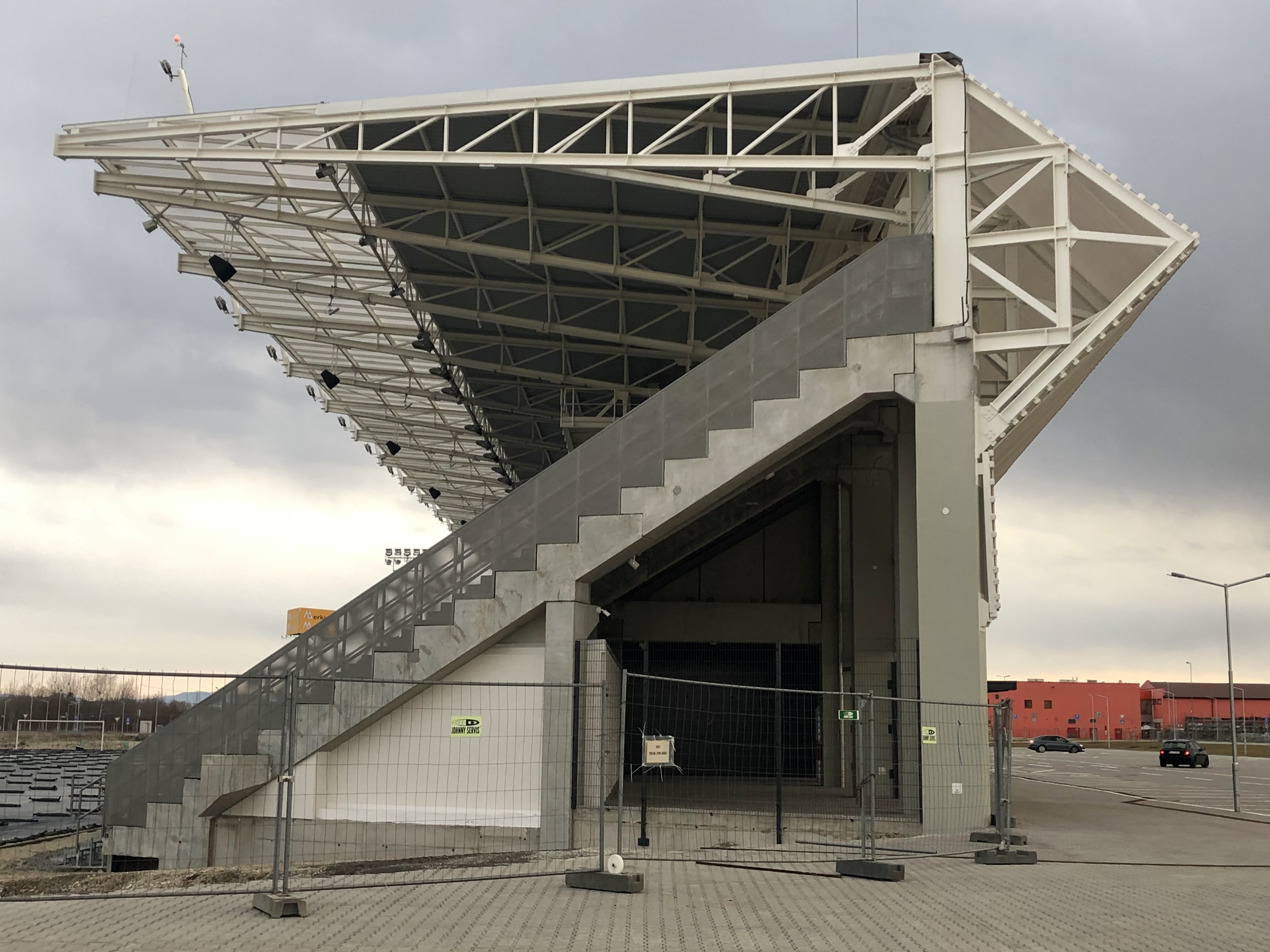
Side view of the grandstand

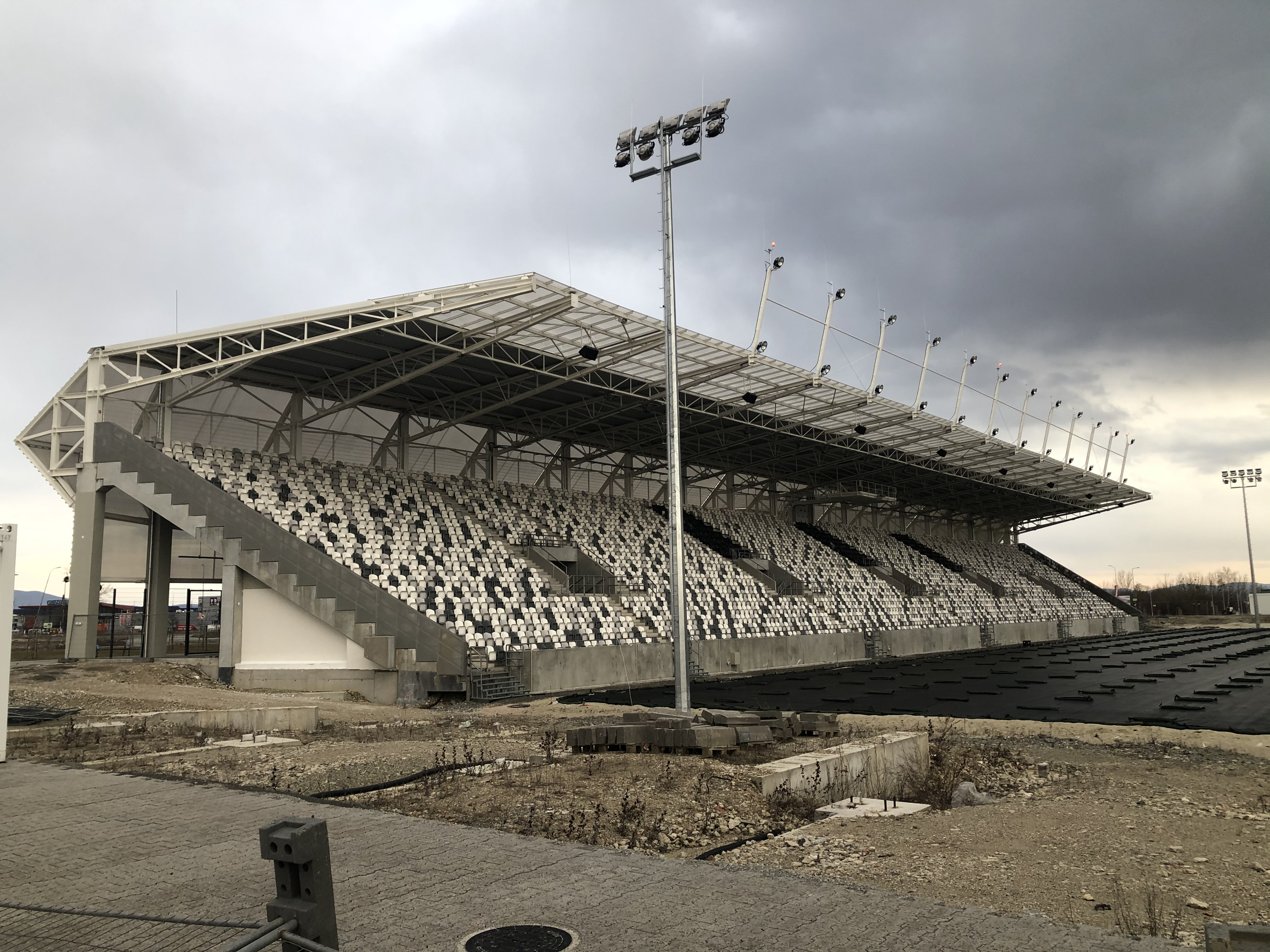
Stand A

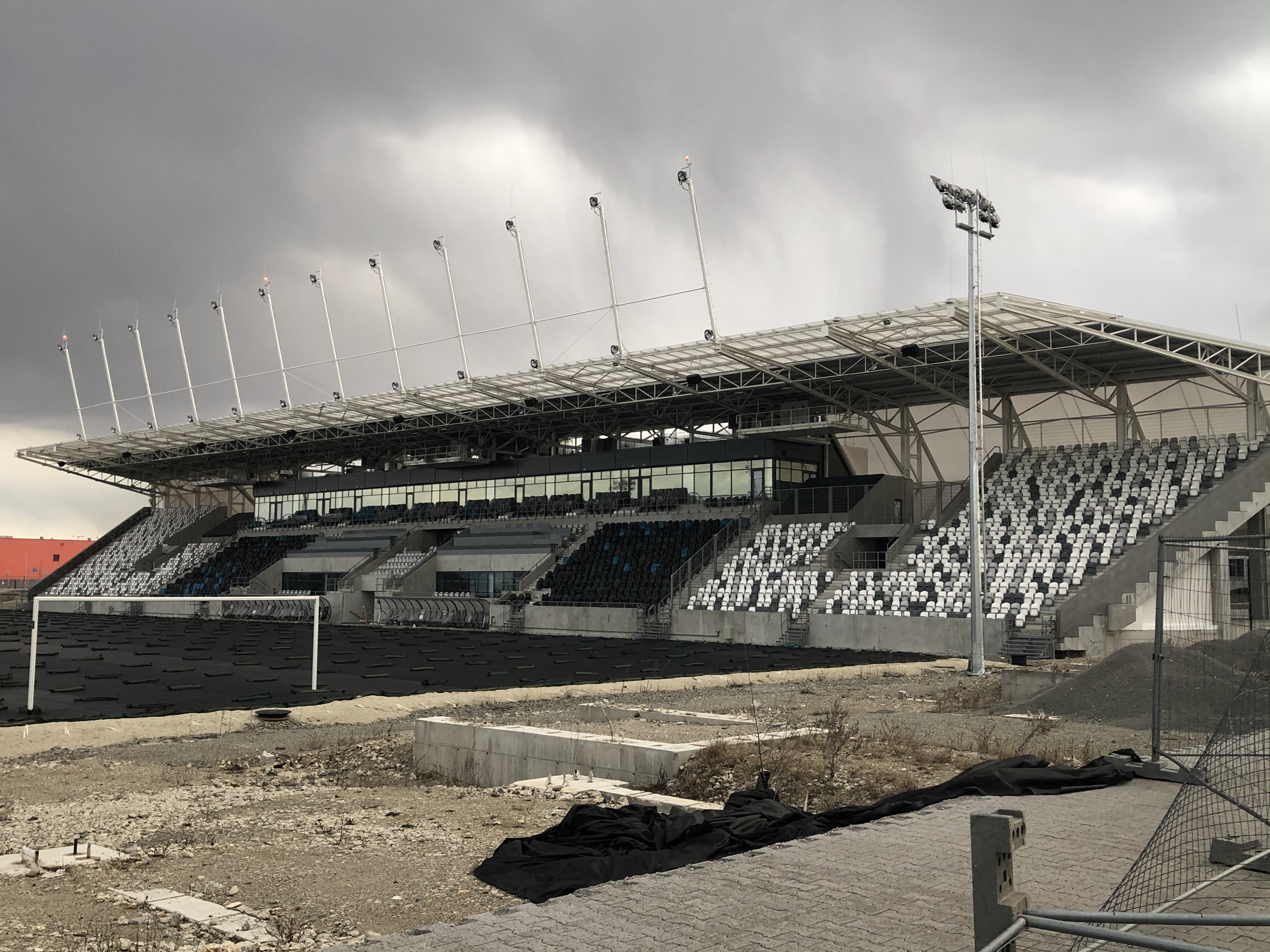
Stand C

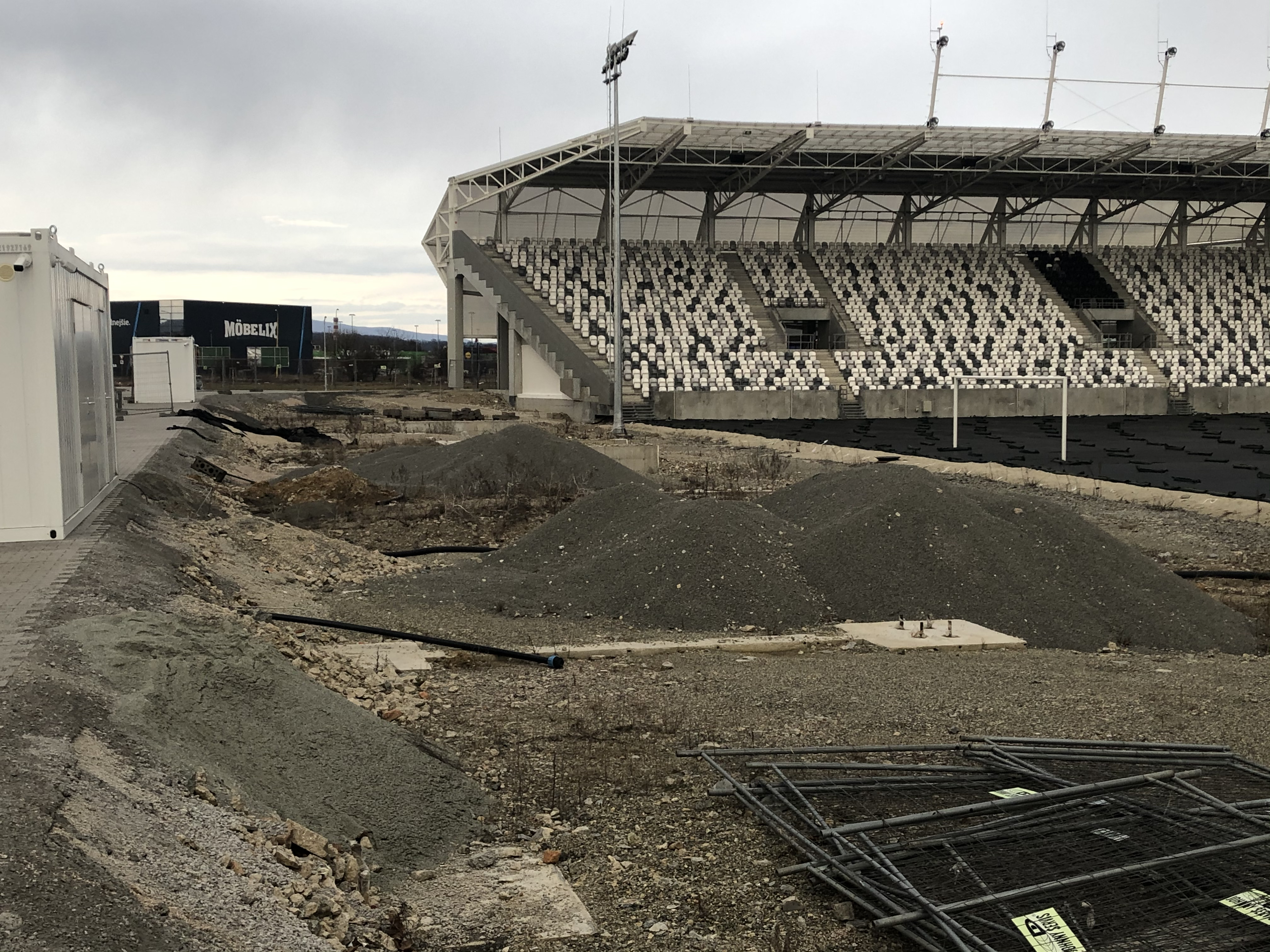
Space for the remaining grandstands
