= FC Košice =

Slovak football club

Košice
- Full name: Football Club Košice
- Nicknames: VSS žltomodrí
- Founded: 27 April 2018; 8 years ago (as FC Košice)
- Ground: Košická futbalová aréna
- Capacity: 12,555
- Owner(s): Arago group (50%); Local investors (50%)
- Chairman: Dušan Trnka
- Head coach: Peter Černák
- League: Slovak First Football League
- 2025–26: Slovak First Football League, 7th of 12
- Website: http://www.fckosice.sk/
Home colours	Away colours

FC Košice is a Slovak professional football club based in Košice, that currently plays in the Slovak First Football League, the highest tier of Slovak football. FC Košice was founded in 2018. They merged into a new club with FK Košice-Barca. From a historical and traditional point of view, the club follows the first football club from Košice, Kassai Athletikai Club from 1903, later known as FC VSS Košice, but from a legal point of view it is a new club with a clean slate.

== History ==
=== 2022–23 ===
In the 2022–23 season, FC Košice managed to advance to the highest Slovak league after winning the 2nd division. Throughout the season, they lagged behind FC Tatran Prešov and it looked like Košice would have to fight for promotion in the play-offs, but Prešov's poor form towards the end of the season meant that Košice became the league winners. Out of 30 matches, they collected 20 wins, 6 draws and only 4 losses. They had a four-point lead over second-placed Prešov.

=== 2023–24 ===
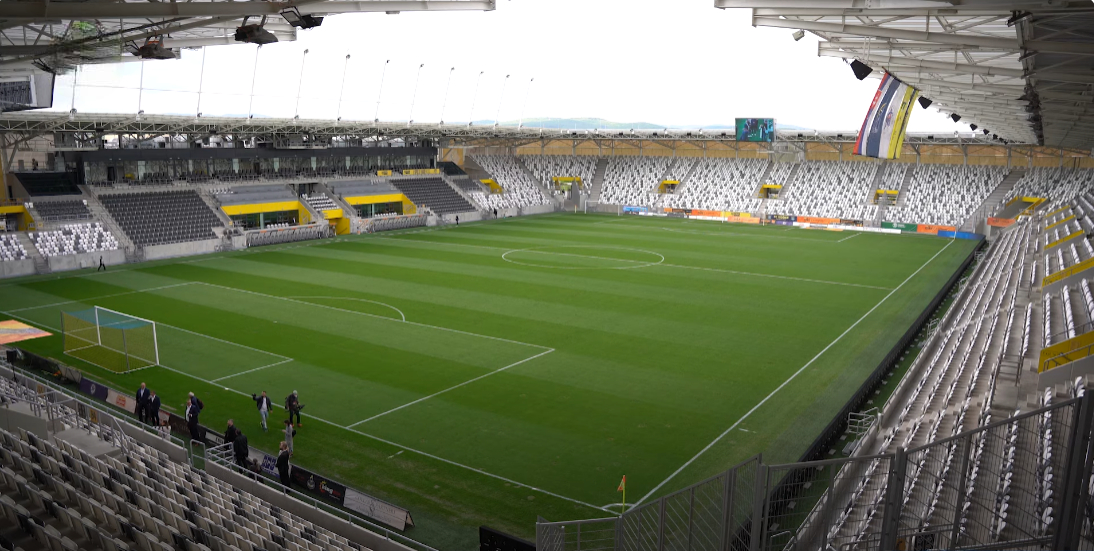
Kosicka Futbalova Arena renovated in 2022.

The club's first ever match in the Niké Liga was played by Košice players on 29 July 2023 against Slovan Bratislava. The match ended in a 0–0 draw. The match was sold out. Košice's first victory in the Niké Liga came on 25 August in an away match against Zemplín Michalovce. Košice won the match 2–0. They finished the season in 10th out of 12th spot with 27 points.

=== 2024–25 ===
Košice's first match was a friendly against Italian side AS Roma. The final result was a 1–1 draw. The match was sold out. They finished the season in 5th spot, playing in the semi-final of the Slovak First Football League play-off for a European spot, however they lost to FK Železiarne Podbrezová on penalties. In spite of the defeat, Košice was awarded a spot in the UEFA Conference League after FC DAC 1904 Dunajská Streda was disqualified due to common ownership with another Conference league contestant.

== Previous names ==
- ŠK Vyšné Opátske (1921)
- TJ Sokol Vyšné Opátske (1948)
- TJ FK Turkon Vyšné Opátske (2006)
- TJ FK Vyšné Opátske (2014)
- FK Košice (2017, new club)
- FC Košice (merger with FK Košice-Barca) (2018–present, new club)

=== Logos ===
2014–2017

== Affiliated clubs ==
The following clubs were affiliated with FC Košice:

- (England) West Ham (2018–2019)
- (Slovakia) Slávia TU Košice (2020-)

== Honours ==
HONOURS (2018–Present)

- This is the list of honours of current “VSS” Košice club.

Slovakia

- Slovak Second Division
  - Winners (1): 2022–23
- Slovak Third Division
  - Winners (1): 2018–19 League East
- Slovak Cup (1961 – Present)
  - Runners-Up (1): 2025-26

PREVIOUS HONOURS (1903 - 2017)

- This is the list of honours of previous “VSS” Košice club FC VSS Košice.

Czechoslovakia

- Czechoslovak First League (1925 – 1938, 1945 – 1993)
  - Runners-up (1): 1970–71
- Czechoslovak Cup (1961–1993)
  - Winners (1): 1992–93
  - Runners-up (3): 1963–64, 1972–73, 1979–80
- 1.SNL (1st Slovak National football league) (1969–1993)
  - Winners (3): 1973–74, 1977–78, 1992–93

Slovakia

- Slovak Superliga (1939 – 1944, 1993 – Present)
  - Winners (2): 1996–97, 1997–98
  - Runners-up (3): 1994–95, 1995–96, 1999–00
- Slovak Cup (1961 – Present)
  - Winners (5): 1972–73, 1979–80, 1992–93, 2008–09, 2013–14
  - Runners-up (3): 1980–81, 1997–98, 1999–00
- Slovak Super Cup (1993 – Present)
  - Winners (1): 1997
  - Runners-up (3): 1998, 2009, 2014
- Slovak Second Division (1993 – Present)
  - Winners (31): 2005–06, 2016–17

== Sponsorship ==
Period	Kit manufacturer	Shirt sponsor
2018–2019	Adidas	MAXIMA BROKER
2019–2021	Adidas	BMW Regnum Košice
2021-2022	Adidas	FASTAV
2022-2023	Adidas	HELL
2023–	Adidas	Niké

== Results ==
=== League and domestic cup history ===
Season	League								Slovak Cup	Europe	Top goalscorer(s)	
Season	Division (Name)	Pos/T	Pld	W	D	L	Score	Pts	Slovak Cup	Europe	Name(s)	Goals
2018–19	3rd (3. Liga)	1/(16)	26	25	0	1	90:9	75	QF, 0–0 (3–4 p) (Spartak Trnava)		(Slovakia) Filip Serečin	26
2019–20	2nd (2. Liga)	10/(16)	17	5	6	6	22:18	21	R4, 2–2 (1–4 p) (AS Trenčín)		(Slovakia) Erik Liener	5
2020–21	2nd (2. Liga)	5/(15)	28	15	4	9	40:27	49	SF, 3-8 agg. (MŠK Žilina)		(Slovakia) František Pavúk / (Slovakia) Boris Gáll	6
2021–22	2nd (2. Liga)	5/(16)	30	17	5	8	73:38	56	Ro16, 1–2 (Spartak Trnava)		(Slovakia) Erik Pačinda	17
2022–23	2nd (2. Liga)	1/(16)	30	20	6	4	61:21	66	R4, 2–3 (Komárno)		(Senegal) Landing Sagna	15
2023–24	1st (Niké liga)	10/(12)	32	7	6	19	27:56	27	Ro16, 2–3 (Trnava)		(Slovenia) Žan Medved	9
2024–25	1st (Niké liga)	5/(12)	32	11	11	10	45:38	44	QF, 0–1 (Slovan)		(Slovenia) Žan Medved	9
2025–26	1st (Niké liga)	7/(12)	32	13	4	15	51-55	43	Final, 1–3 (Žilina)	ECL, Q2 ( (Belarus) FC Neman Grodno)	(Slovakia) Roman Čerepkai	10

=== European competition history ===
Season	Competition	Round	Club	Home	Away	Aggregate
2025-26	UEFA Conference League	2QR	(Belarus) Neman Grodno	2–3	1–1	3–4

== Current squad ==
As of 20 September 2026.

Note: Flags indicate national team as defined under FIFA eligibility rules; some limited exceptions apply. Players may hold more than one non-FIFA nationality.

No.	Pos.	Nation	Player
5	MF	SVK	Jakub Marko
6	MF	SVK	Filip Lichý
7	MF	SVK	Milan Dimun
8	MF	SVK	Dávid Gallovič
10	MF	CRO	Edin Julardžija
13	MF	SVK	Matej Jakúbek
15	MF	SVK	Miroslav Sovič
18	DF	SVK	Tomáš Ďurko
21	DF	SVK	Daniel Magda
22	GK	SVK	Matúš Kira
23	MF	SVK	Matej Madleňák
24	DF	SVK	Dominik Kružliak
25	MF	SVK	Marek Zsigmund

No.	Pos.	Nation	Player
26	DF	SVK	Sebastian Kóša (on loan from (Spain) Real Zaragoza)
29	DF	SLE	Osman Kakay
30	FW	BIH	Aleksandar Kahvić
31	DF	ENG	Taylor Moore
32	GK	SVK	Filip Kalanin
37	MF	SVK	Juraj Teplan
44	MF	SVK	Maxim Mateáš
47	DF	AUT	Leonardo Lukačević
66	DF	MNE	Bojan Damjanović (on loan from (Montenegro) Sutjeska Nikšić)
77	FW	SVK	Milan Rehuš
80	MF	EST	Kevor Palumets
87	MF	SVK	Viliam Vrabel
99	FW	MNE	Aleksa Maraš

For recent transfers, see List of Slovak football transfers summer 2026

=== Out on loan ===
Note: Flags indicate national team as defined under FIFA eligibility rules; some limited exceptions apply. Players may hold more than one non-FIFA nationality.

No.	Pos.	Nation	Player
17	FW	SVK	Tomáš Husarčík (at MFK Zvolen until 30 June 2027)
31	MF	AUT	Emilian Metu (at Inter Bratislava until 30 June 2027)
—	DF	SVK	Ľubomír Žinčák (at Humenné until 30 June 2027)

No.	Pos.	Nation	Player
—	FW	SVK	Ľubomír Žinčák (at Lokomotíva Košice until 30 June 2027)
—	FW	ENG	Alex-Jason Amadin (at Spartak Medzev until 30 June 2027)

== Technical staff ==
Position	Staff
Sport Director	Ján Gajdošík
Head Coach	Peter Černák
Assistant Coach	Peter Šinglár
Assistant Coach	Jaroslav Kolbas
Goalkeeping Coach	TBA
Sport Manager	(England) Terry Westley
Fitness Coach	(Slovakia) Igor Bakaľár
Technical Manager	(Slovakia) Roman Šimko
Team doctor	(Slovakia) MUDr. Ronald Polomský
Team doctor	(Slovakia) MUDr. Peter Polan
Physiotherapist	(Slovakia) Peter Vresilovič
Masseur	(Slovakia) Dárius Kolodzej
Masseur	(Slovakia) Dominik Lukáč

- Last updated: 11 November 2025

== Notable players ==
The following players had international caps for their respective countries. Players whose name is listed in bold represented their countries while playing for FC Košice.

- (Benin) Tidjani Anaane
- (Slovakia) **Roman Čerepkai**
- (Panama) **Eric Davis**
- (Slovakia) Michal Faško
- (Sierra Leone) Osman Kakay
- (Slovakia) Marián Kello
- (Kazakhstan) Galymzhan Kenzhebek
- (Slovakia) Sebastian Kóša
- (Slovakia) Ján Krivák
- (Slovakia) Dominik Kružliak
- (Slovakia) Richard Lásik
- (Montenegro) **Aleksa Maraš**
- (Estonia) **Kevor Palumets**
- (Morocco) Moha Rharsalla
- (Slovakia) Erik Pačinda
- (Albania) Kristi Qose

== Managers ==
Year	Name
2017 – 2019	(Slovakia) Miroslav Sovič
2019	(Slovakia) Gejza Farkaš
2019 – 2020	(Slovakia) Marek Fabuľa
2020 – 2021	(Slovakia) Peter Šinglár (interim)
2021 – 2022	(Slovakia) Jozef Vukušič
2022 – 2023	(Slovakia) Anton Šoltis
2023 – 2024	(Slovakia) Ján Kozák jr.
2024	(Slovakia) Gergely Geri
2024 – 2025	(Czech Republic) Roman Skuhravý
2025	(Slovakia) Matej Čobik-Ferčík (interim)
2025	(Czech Republic) František Straka
2026-	(Slovakia) Peter Černák
