= 2022–23 AS Trenčín season =

AS Trenčín
2022–23 season
- Owner: Tscheu La Ling
- Chairman: Róbert Rybníček
- Manager: Peter Hyballa
- Stadium: Štadión na Sihoti
- Fortuna liga: 9th
- Slovak Cup: Semi-finals
Home colours	Away colours

The 2022–23 AS Trenčín season was the club's 23rd season in the Slovak Super Liga and 12th consecutive. AS Trenčín participated in the Fortuna Liga and Slovak Cup.

== Players ==
As of 14 January 2023

Note: Flags indicate national team as defined under FIFA eligibility rules; some limited exceptions apply. Players may hold more than one non-FIFA nationality.

No.	Pos.	Nation	Player
2	DF	SVK	Samuel Bagín
3	DF	SVK	Roman Šebeň
4	DF	SVK	Samuel Kozlovský
6	MF	NGR	Adewale Oladoye
7	FW	CPV	Eynel Soares
8	MF	SVK	Artur Gajdoš
9	FW	NGR	Chinonso Emeka
11	FW	NGR	Philip Azango
13	DF	NGR	Kingsley Madu
15	DF	SRB	Lazar Stojsavljević
19	DF	CPV	Kelvin Pires
20	MF	GHA	Rahim Ibrahim
21	FW	SVK	Lukáš Letenay

No.	Pos.	Nation	Player
22	DF	CYP	Strahinja Kerkez
23	MF	SVK	Dominik Hollý
28	MF	SVK	Matúš Kmeť
30	GK	SVK	Matúš Sláviček
31	MF	SRB	Filip Bainović
32	DF	SVK	Šimon Mičuda
35	DF	NGR	Reuben Yem
78	FW	IDN	Witan Sulaeman
81	MF	SVK	Lukáš Ďuriška
91	GK	CPV	Vozinha
99	GK	SVK	Michal Kukučka
—	FW	NGR	Lekan Okunola

== Transfers ==
=== Transfers in ===
Entry date	Position	No.	Player	From	Ref.
1 July 2022	DF	22	(Cyprus) Strahinja Kerkez	(Austria) LASK Linz	

=== Loans in ===
Date	Position	No.	Player	From	End date	Ref.

=== Transfers out ===
Date	Position	Player	To	Ref.
30 June 2022	FW	(Slovakia) Adam Tučný	(Slovakia) MFK Ružomberok	
30 June 2022	DF	(Brazil) Ramón		
30 June 2022	DF	(Finland) Juha Pirinen	(Greece) Volos F.C.	
30 June 2022	DF	(Slovakia) Adrián Slávik	(Slovakia) MFK Dukla Banská Bystrica	
30 June 2022	FW	(Slovakia) Erik Jendrišek	(Slovakia) MFK Tatran Liptovský Mikuláš	
30 June 2022	GK	(Czech Republic) Matouš Babka		

=== Loans out ===
Date	Position	Player	To	End date	Ref.

== Friendlies ==
Win Draw Loss

=== Pre-season ===
20 June 2022	Dukla Banská Bystrica (Slovakia)	3–2	(Slovakia) Trenčín	Banská Bystrica
12:00 CEST (UTC+02:00)	Pišoja 17'; Polievka 31'; Franko 88'	Report	Kerkez (yellow card) 26'; Bainović 38' (pen.), (yellow card) 42'; Sláviček (yellow card) 87'; Soraes 88'; Ibrahim (yellow card) 90'	Attendance: 100

25 June 2022	Slovácko (Czech Republic)	2–0	(Slovakia) Trenčín	Staré Město
11:00 CEST (UTC+02:00)				Stadium: Stadion Širůch

2 July 2022	Púchov (Slovakia)	0–3	(Slovakia) Trenčín	Krásna Ves
CEST (UTC+02:00)				Stadium: Futbalový štadión Krásna Ves

6 July 2022	Pohronie (Slovakia)	3–4	(Slovakia) Trenčín	Žiar nad Hronom
CEST (UTC+02:00)				Stadium: Mestský štadión Žiar nad Hronom

9 July 2022	Fastav Zlín (Czech Republic)	2–1	(Slovakia) Trenčín	Zlín
CEST (UTC+02:00)				Stadium: Areál Vlastislava Marečka

== Competition overview ==
Competition	First match	Last match	Starting round	Final position	Record							
Competition	First match	Last match	Starting round	Final position	Pld	W	D	L	GF	GA	GD	Win %
Fortuna liga	16 July 2022	20 May 2023	Matchday 1	9th	32	9	9	14	35	52	−17	28.13
Slovak Cup	24 August 2022	5 April 2023	Second round	Semi-finals	7	5	0	2	29	5	+24	71.43
Total					39	14	9	16	64	57	+7	35.90

Source: Competitions

== Fortuna Liga ==
=== Regular stage ===
==== League table ====
Pos	Team	Pld	W	D	L	GF	GA	GD	Pts	Qualification
7	Ružomberok	22	7	9	6	24	22	+2	30	Qualification for the relegation group
8	Zemplín Michalovce	22	6	5	11	22	34	−12	23	Qualification for the relegation group
9	Zlaté Moravce	22	4	11	7	28	35	−7	23	Qualification for the relegation group
10	Trenčín	22	5	7	10	20	33	−13	22	Qualification for the relegation group
11	Skalica	22	4	7	11	19	31	−12	19	Qualification for the relegation group
12	Tatran Liptovský Mikuláš	22	1	6	15	17	40	−23	9	Qualification for the relegation group

Source: Niké liga (in Slovak)
Rules for classification: 1) Points; 2) Head-to-head points; 3) Head-to-head goal difference; 4) Head-to-head away goals scored; 5) Play-off.

==== Results summary ====
Overall								Home						Away					
Pld	W	D	L	GF	GA	GD	Pts	W	D	L	GF	GA	GD	W	D	L	GF	GA	GD
22	5	7	10	20	33	−13	22	4	4	3	14	13	+1	1	3	7	6	20	−14

==== Results by round ====
Round	1	2	3	4	5	6	7	8	9	10	11	12	13	14	15	16	17	18	19	20	21	22
Ground	H	A	A	H	A	H	A	H	A	H	A	A	H	H	A	H	A	H	A	H	A	H
Result	D	L	L	W	D	W	W	L	L	L	L	D	W	W	L	D	D	L	L	D	L	D
Position																						

Source: AS Trenčín (in Slovak)
A = Away; H = Home; W = Win; D = Draw; L = Loss; P = Postponed

==== Matches ====
16 July 2022 1	Trenčín	0–0	Žilina	Trenčín
18:00 CEST (UTC+02:00)	Ďuriška (yellow card) 82'	Report		Stadium: Štadión na Sihoti; Attendance: 1,305

23 July 2022 2	Slovan Bratislava	4–0	Trenčín	Bratislava
18:00 CEST (UTC+02:00)	David 36', 90'; Andre 69'; Agbo (yellow card) 79'; Juraj 82'	Report		Stadium: Tehelné Pole; Attendance: 5,338

30 July 2022 3	Skalica	2–0	Trenčín	Skalica
18:00 CEST (UTC+02:00)	Potoma (yellow card) 12'; Ján 28' (pen.); Martin 64'; Baumgartner (yellow card) 79'	Report	Gajdoš (yellow card) 27'; Bainović (yellow card) 38'	Stadium: Mestský štadión Skalica; Attendance: 1,832

5 August 2022 4	Trenčín	3–1	Zemplín Michalovce	Trenčín
20:30 CEST (UTC+02:00)	Artur 5'; Lavrinčík (yellow card) 18'; Stojsavljević (yellow card) 58'; Ibrahim (yellow card) 64'; Kingsley 67'; Kelvin 90'	Report	Adler 18' (pen.); Da Silva (yellow card) 45'; Slebodník (yellow card) 64'; Garcia (yellow card) 81'	Stadium: Štadión na Sihoti; Attendance: 703

13 August 2022 5	Ružomberok	0–0	Trenčín	Ružomberok
18:00 CEST (UTC+02:00)	Madleňák (yellow card) 56'	Report	Madu (yellow card) 55'; Ibrahim (yellow card) 64'; Letenay (yellow card) 74'; Stojsavljević (yellow card) 90'	Stadium: Štadión pod Čebraťom; Attendance: 1,225

20 August 2022 6	Trenčín	2–1	Tatran Liptovský Mikuláš	Trenčín
18:00 CEST (UTC+02:00)	Artur 18'; Kupusović (yellow card) 45'; Lazar (yellow card) 68', (goal) 78'; Ibrahim (yellow card) 90'	Report	Gerát (yellow card) 29'; Imrich 52'	Stadium: Štadión na Sihoti; Attendance: 716

27 August 2022 7	DAC Dunajská Streda	1–2	Trenčín	Dunajská Streda
18:00 CEST (UTC+02:00)	Ammar 27'; Ciganiks (yellow card) 90'	Report	Filip 65', 68'	Stadium: MOL Aréna; Attendance: 4,507

30 August 2022 8	Trenčín	0–2	Dukla Banská Bystrica	Trenčín
20:30 CEST (UTC+02:00)	Lavrinčík (yellow card) 82'; Witan (yellow card) 84'	Report	Róbert 23'; Záhumenský (yellow card) 43'; Martin 81'	Stadium: Štadión na Sihoti; Attendance: 854

3 September 2022 9	Zlaté Moravce	1–0	Trenčín	Zlaté Moravce
18:00 CEST (UTC+02:00)	Denis 45'; Brenkus (yellow card) 80'	Report	Madu (yellow card) 80'	Stadium: ViOn Aréna; Attendance: 1,023

11 September 2022 10	Trenčín	0–2	Spartak Trnava	Trenčín
17:30 CEST (UTC+02:00)	Stojsavljević (yellow card) 38'; Bainović (yellow card) 53'	Report	Milan 27'; Sebastian 52'; Savvidis (yellow card) 87'	Stadium: Štadión na Sihoti; Attendance: 1,519

17 September 2022 11	Podbrezová	2–0	Trenčín	Podbrezová
18:00 CEST (UTC+02:00)	Paraj 7', (yellow card) 61'; Kuzma 33'; Pavúk (yellow card) 70'; Bartoš (yellow card) 90'	Report	Soares (yellow card) 52'; Pires 72'; Bainović (yellow card) 74'	Stadium: Zelpo Aréna; Attendance: 1,722

1 October 2022 12	Žilina	1–1	Trenčín	Žilina
18:00 CEST (UTC+02:00)	Rusnák (yellow card) 31'; Jambor 75'; Leitner (yellow card) 90'	Report	Hollý (yellow card) 31'; Stojsavljević (yellow card) 41'; Soares 58'; Kmeť (yellow card) 67'; Letenay (yellow card) 88' (yellow-red card) 90'	Stadium: Štadión pod Dubňom; Attendance: 1,259

9 October 2022 13	Trenčín	4–0	Slovan Bratislava	Trenčín
18:00 CEST (UTC+02:00)	Pires 20', 58', (yellow card) 89'; Soares 31'; Kupusović (yellow card) 71'; Ibrahim 86'	Report	Weiss (yellow card) 33'; Ramírez (yellow card) 89'	Stadium: Štadión na Sihoti; Attendance: 1,703

15 October 2022 14	Trenčín	3–1	Skalica	Trenčín
18:00 CEST (UTC+02:00)	Bainović 66'; Kmeť 69', 87'; Yem (yellow card) 71'; Ibrahim (yellow card) 83'	Report	Nagy (yellow card) 11'; Václav (yellow card) 83'; Fábry 90'	Stadium: Štadión na Sihoti; Attendance: 824

22 October 2022 15	Zemplín Michalovce	2–0	Trenčín	Michalovce
15:00 CEST (UTC+02:00)	Kanu 46'; Njie (yellow card) 74'; Marcin (yellow card) 75'; Da Silva 81'; Slebodník (yellow card) 90'	Report	Bainović (yellow card) 80'	Stadium: Mestský futbalový štadión Attendance: 603

29 October 2022 16	Trenčín	0–0	Ružomberok	Trenčín
15:00 CEST (UTC+02:00)	Emeka (yellow card) 8' (yellow-red card) 10'; Kukučka (yellow card) 11'; Marcin (yellow card) 75'; Ibrahim 60'; Lavrinčík (yellow card) 90'	Report	Kelemen (yellow card) 60'	Stadium: Štadión na Sihoti; Attendance: 799

5 November 2022 17	Tatran Liptovský Mikuláš	1–1	Trenčín	Liptovský Mikuláš
15:00 CEST (UTC+02:00)	Jendrišek 68'	Report	Lavrinčík (yellow card) 43'; Witan 83'; Pires (yellow card) 88'; Gajdoš (yellow card) 89'; Letenay (yellow card) 90'	Stadium: Stadium Liptovský Mikuláš; Attendance: 421

12 November 2022 18	Trenčín	0–4	DAC Dunajská Streda	Trenčín
15:00 CEST (UTC+02:00)	Emeka (yellow card) 8' (yellow-red card) 39'; Pires (yellow card) 31' (yellow-red card) 87'; Kukučka (yellow card) 39'; Stojsavljević (yellow card) 42' (yellow-red card) 64'; Hollý (yellow card) 60'; Bainović (yellow card) 89'	Report	Gavrić (yellow card) 14'; Risvanis (yellow card) 29'; Dimun (yellow card) 42'; Kalmár 84', 88' (pen.); Kružliak 90'; Blackman 90'	Stadium: Štadión na Sihoti; Attendance: 1,576

10 February 2023 19	Dukla Banská Bystrica	3–0	Trenčín	Banská Bystrica
17:30 CEST (UTC+02:00)	Polievka 2' 7'; Ľupták (yellow card) 52'; Franko 56'; Pišoja (yellow card) 64'; Slávik (yellow card) 75'	Report	Kelvin Pires (yellow card) 35' (yellow-red card) 78'; Bagín (yellow card) 45+1'; Yem (yellow card) 51'	Stadium: SNP Stadium DUKLA; Referee: (Slovakia) Michal Očenáš

18 February 2023 20	Trenčín	1–1	Zlaté Moravce	Trenčín
15:00 CEST (UTC+02:00)	Ibrahim (yellow card) 14'; Bagín 38'; Kmeť (yellow card) 68'; Stojsavljević (yellow card) 85'	Report	Pinte 73'; Duga (yellow card) 82'	Stadium: Štadión na Sihoti; Referee: (Slovakia) Kristián Micheľ

25 February 2023 21	Spartak Trnava	3–2	Trenčín	Trnava
15:00 CEST (UTC+02:00)	Twardzik 3'; Ofori 6'; Procházka (yellow card) 39'; Taiwo 40' (yellow card) 90+6'; Paur (yellow card) 90+3'	Report	Gajdoš 60' (pen.) (yellow card) 90+4'; Kupusović 63'; Eynel Soares (yellow card) 65'; Oladoye (yellow card) 65'; Hollý (yellow card) 84' (yellow-red card) 91+3'	Stadium: Anton Malatinský Stadium; Referee: (Slovakia) Bálint Kišš

4 March 2023 22	Trenčín	1–1	Podbrezová	Trenčín
16:30 CEST (UTC+02:00)	Bainović 45'; Oladoye (yellow card) 67'; Gajdoš (yellow card) 87'	Report	Špyrka (yellow card) 29'; Bartoš (yellow card) 84', (goal) 90'	Stadium: Štadión na Sihoti; Attendance: 483; Referee: Michal Očenáš

=== Relegation group ===
Pos	Team	Pld	W	D	L	GF	GA	GD	Pts	Qualification or relegation	RUŽ	SKA	TRE	ZMI	ZLM	TLM
1	Ružomberok	32	12	11	9	43	31	+12	47	Qualification for the Europa Conference League play-offs	—	1–2	4–1	2–0	2–0	3–0
2	Skalica	32	10	10	12	38	38	0	40		1–1	—	2–0	3–2	0–1	4–0
3	Trenčín	32	9	9	14	35	52	−17	36		0–3	1–3	—	3–3	2–1	2–2
4	Zemplín Michalovce	32	9	9	14	39	50	−11	36		2–2	1–1	0–2	—	1–0	0–0
5	Zlaté Moravce (O)	32	6	13	13	35	49	−14	31	Qualification for the relegation play-offs	1–0	0–0	1–2	2–5	—	0–1
6	Tatran Liptovský Mikuláš (R)	32	3	9	20	24	59	−35	18	Relegation to the 2. Liga	2–1	0–3	0–2	1–3	1–1	—

Source: Niké liga (in Slovak)
Legend: Blue = home team win; Yellow = draw; Red = away team win.
Rules for classification: 1) Points; 2) Head-to-head points; 3) Head-to-head goal difference; 4) Head-to-head away goals scored; 5) Play-off.
(O) Play-off winners; (R) Relegated

10 March 2023 1	Trenčín	0–3	Ružomberok	Trenčín
17:30 CET (UTC+1)	Kozlovský (yellow card) 27'; Stojsavljević (yellow card) 44'; Okunola (yellow card) 86'	Report	Domonkos (yellow card) 8'; Macejko 37'; Gerec 79', 82'; Bobček (yellow card) 90'; Zsigmund (yellow card) 90'	Stadium: Štadión na Sihoti; Attendance: 371; Referee: Peter Ziemba

18 March 2023 2	Skalica	2–0	Trenčín	Skalica
15:00 CET (UTC+1)	Yao 13'; Haša 32'	Report		Stadium: Mestský štadión Skalica; Attendance: 921; Referee: Peter Kráľovič

1 April 2023 3	Tatran Liptovský Mikuláš	0–2	Trenčín	Poprad
18:00 CEST (UTC+2)		Report	Bainović 47', 64'	Stadium: NTC Poprad; Attendance: 221; Referee: Boris Marhefka

8 April 2023 4	Trenčín	3–3	Zemplín Michalovce	Trenčín
18:03 CEST (UTC+2)	Stojsavljević 27'; Hollý 58'; Emeka 90'	Report	Jánošík 6'; Peña 51'; Marcin 90' (pen.)	Stadium: Štadión na Sihoti

15 April 2023 5	Trenčín	2–1	Zlaté Moravce	Trenčín
18:00 CEST (UTC+2)	Pires 70'; Emeka 90'	Report	Čerepkai 82'	Stadium: Štadión na Sihoti; Attendance: 696; Referee: Ivan Kružliak

21 April 2023 6	Ružomberok	4–1	Trenčín	Ružomberok
17:30 CEST (UTC+2)	Bobček 21'; Domonkos 28'; Gerec 73'; Kelemen 90'	Report	Gajdoš 58'	Stadium: Štadión pod Čebraťom; Attendance: 842; Referee: Lukáš Dzivjak

28 April 2023 7	Trenčín	2–2	Tatran Liptovský Mikuláš	Trenčín
18:00 CEST (UTC+2)	Gajdoš 49', 89' (pen.)	Report	Gerát 23'; Spychka 45'	Stadium: Štadión na Sihoti; Attendance: 905; Referee: Filip Glova

6 May 2023 8	Zemplín Michalovce	0–2	Trenčín	Michalovce
18:00 CEST (UTC+2)		Report	Bagín 30'; Stojsavljević 42'	Stadium: Mestský futbalový štadión Attendance: 631; Referee: Boris Marhefka

12 May 2023 9	Zlaté Moravce	1–2	Trenčín	Zlaté Moravce
18:30 CEST (UTC+2)	Čerepkai 13' (pen.)	Report	Azango 45'; Emeka 63'	Stadium: ViOn Aréna; Attendance: 1,118; Referee: Michal Očenáš

20 May 2023 10	Trenčín	1–3	Skalica	Trenčín
18:00 CEST (UTC+2)	Emeka 28'	Report	Fábry 39' (pen.), 77'; Vlasko 90' (pen.)	Stadium: Štadión na Sihoti; Attendance: 770; Referee: Maroš Libiak

== Slovak Cup ==
24 August 2022 Second round	Slovan Hlohovec	0–14	Trenčín	Hlohovec
CEST (UTC+02:00)			Ibrahim 2'; Witan 12', 32'; Bainović 16', 19' (pen.), 84'; Kozlovský 34'; Pires 43'; Lavrinčík 45+1'; Gaži 52'; Oladoye 54', 57'; Kmeť 70'; Gajdoš 87'	Stadium: Stadion Slovan Hlohovec

14 September 2022 Third round	FK Beluša	0–4	Trenčín	Beluša
CEST (UTC+02:00)			Hollý 4'; Bainović 15'; Kmeť 42'; Ďuriška 62'	Stadium: Stadium TJ KOVO Beluša

19 October 2022 Fourth round	FK Slavoj Trebišov	0–4	Trenčín	Trebišov
CEST (UTC+02:00)			Pires 41'; Emeka 83', 86', 89'	Stadium: Mestský štadión Trebišov

9 November 2022 Round of 16	Trenčín	5–0	Spartak Myjava	Trenčín
CET (UTC+1)	Emeka 2'; Ibrahim 31'; Soares 54'; Witan 79'; Ďuriška 82'			Stadium: Štadión na Sihoti

28 February 2023 Quarter-finals	Tatran Prešov	0–1	Trenčín	Prešov
14:30 CET (UTC+1)		Report	Hollý 17'	Stadium: Štadión Tatranu; Referee: Marián Ruc

=== Semi-finals ===
15 March 2023 First leg	Trenčín	1–2	Spartak Trnava	Trenčín
18:00 CET (UTC+1)	Hollý 55'	Report	Kóša 75'; Ofori 90+4'	Stadium: Štadión na Sihoti; Referee: Michal Očenáš

5 April 2023 Second leg	Spartak Trnava	3–0 (5–1 agg.)	Trenčín	Trnava
18:00 CEST (UTC+2)	Procházka 44'; Bukata 67'; Dyjan 89'	Report		Stadium: Anton Malatinský Stadium; Referee: Michal Smolak
Note: Spartak Trnava won 5-1 on aggregate.

== Statistics ==
=== Goalscorers ===
No.	Pos.	Nat.	Name	Fortuna Liga	Slovak Cup	Total
31	MF	(Serbia)	Filip Bainović	3	4	7
19	FW	(Cape Verde)	Kelvin Pires	3	2	5
78	MF	(Indonesia)	Witan Sulaeman	1	3	4
28	MF	(Slovakia)	Matúš Kmeť	2	2	4
9	FW	(Nigeria)	Chinonso Emeka	0	4	4
8	MF	(Slovakia)	Artur Gajdoš	2	1	3
7	MF	(Cape Verde)	Eynel Soares	2	1	3
20	MF	(Ghana)	Rahim Ibrahim	1	2	3
81	MF	(Slovakia)	Lukáš Ďuriška	0	2	2
6	MF	(Nigeria)	Adewale Oladoye	0	2	2
23	MF	(Slovakia)	Dominik Hollý	0	1	1
13	FW	(Nigeria)	Kingsley Madu	1	0	1
15	FW	(Serbia)	Lazar Stojsavljević	1	0	1
4	DF	(Slovakia)	Samuel Kozlovský	0	1	1
—	MF	(Slovakia)	Adam Gaži	0	1	1
—	MF	(Slovakia)	Samuel Lavrinčík	0	1	1
Totals				16	27	43
