= 2022–23 Slovak First Football League =

Fortuna Liga
- Season: 2022–23
- Dates: Regular season: 15 July 2022 – 20 May 2023; Europa Conference League play-offs and Relegation play-offs: 23 – 26 May 2023
- Champions: Slovan Bratislava
- Relegated: Tatran Liptovský Mikuláš
- Champions League: Slovan Bratislava
- Europa Conference League: Spartak Trnava; DAC Dunajská Streda; Žilina
- Matches: 192
- Goals: 541 (2.82 per match)
- Top goalscorer: Nikola Krstović (18 goals)
- Biggest home win: Spartak Trnava 6–1 Podbrezová (11 March 2023)
- Biggest away win: Zemplín Michalovce 0–4 Spartak Trnava (14 August 2022); Tatran Liptovský Mikuláš 1–5 Slovan Bratislava (14 August 2022); Trenčín 0–4 DAC Dunajská Streda (12 November 2022)
- Highest scoring: Žilina 6–4 Dukla Banská Bystrica (17 March 2023)
- Highest attendance: 15,606; Slovan Bratislava 0–1 Podbrezová (20 May 2023)
- Lowest attendance: 141; Tatran Liptovský Mikuláš 0–3 Skalica (11 March 2023)
- All statistics correct as of 20 May 2023.

The 2022–23 Slovak First Football League (known as Fortuna liga for sponsorship reasons) was the 30th season of the top-tier football league in Slovakia since its establishment in 1993.

The winter break began earlier than usual this season due to the 2022 FIFA World Cup in Qatar. The last full round was scheduled for 11–13 November 2022. Four postponed matches then took place on 24 and 27 November. The first round after the winter break was scheduled for 10–12 February 2023.

Four-time defending champion Slovan Bratislava successfully defended their title, securing a record-extending fifth consecutive and 13th overall championship.

== Teams ==
=== Team changes ===
Twelve teams competed in the league – nine teams from the previous season, and three teams promoted from the 2. Liga.

Podbrezová (promoted to the top flight for the second time) earned an automatic promotion thanks to the victory of the 2. Liga, replacing Pohronie (relegated after three years in the top flight), who finished last in the 2021–22 Slovak First Football League.

Dukla Banská Bystrica (promoted after seven years of absence) and Skalica (promoted to the top flight for the second time) were also promoted, and they will replace Senica and Sereď – two teams that did not obtain a licence for the 2022–23 season.

Promoted from: 2. Liga	Relegated from Fortuna liga
Podbrezová; Dukla Banská Bystrica; Skalica	Pohronie; Sereď; Senica

=== Stadiums and locations ===
Location of teams in Fortuna liga 2022–23

FC DAC 1904 Dunajská Streda	MFK Dukla Banská Bystrica	FK Železiarne Podbrezová	MFK Ružomberok
MOL Aréna; UEFA	Štadión SNP; UEFA	ZELPO Aréna; UEFA	Štadión pod Čebraťom
Capacity: 12,700	Capacity: 7,900	Capacity: 4,061	Capacity: 4,817
MFK Skalica	ŠK Slovan Bratislava	FC Spartak Trnava	MFK Tatran Liptovský Mikuláš
Štadión MFK Skalica	Tehelné pole UEFA	Štadión Antona Malatinského; UEFA	NTC Poprad; UEFA
Capacity: 1,500	Capacity: 22,500	Capacity: 19,200	Capacity: 5,700
AS Trenčín	MFK Zemplín Michalovce	FC ViOn Zlaté Moravce	MŠK Žilina
Štadión Sihoť; UEFA	Mestský futbalový štadión UEFA	Štadión FC ViOn; UEFA	Štadión pod Dubňom; UEFA
Capacity: 4,200 (10,000 planned)	Capacity: 4,440	Capacity: 4,006	Capacity: 11,253

=== Personnel and kits ===
Team	President	Manager	Captain	Kit manufacturer	Shirt sponsor
DAC Dunajská Streda	(Slovakia) Oszkár Világi	(Slovakia) Adrián Guľa	(Hungary) Zsolt Kalmár	Macron	Kukkonia
Dukla Banská Bystrica	(Slovakia) Ivan Šabo	(Czech Republic) Michal Ščasný	(Slovakia) Róbert Polievka	Adidas	Veolia
Podbrezová	(Slovakia) Július Kriváň	(Czech Republic) Roman Skuhravý	(Slovakia) Richard Ludha	Adidas	Niké
Ružomberok	(Slovakia) Milan Fiľo	(Slovakia) Peter Struhár	(Slovakia) Marek Zsigmund	Adidas	Niké
Skalica	(Slovakia) Peter Bartoš	(Slovakia) Pavol Majerník	(Slovakia) Martin Nagy	Puma	Tipsport
Slovan Bratislava	(Slovakia) Ivan Kmotrík	(Slovakia) Vladimír Weiss	(Slovakia) Vladimír Weiss Jr.	Adidas	Niké
Spartak Trnava	(Slovakia) Peter Macho	(Slovakia) Michal Gašparík	(Slovakia) Martin Mikovič	Adidas	Tipsport
Tatran Liptovský Mikuláš	(Slovakia) Milan Mikušiak	(Slovakia) Ondrej Desiatnik	(Slovakia) Richard Bartoš	Kappa	VEREX, Tipsport
Trenčín	(Slovakia) Róbert Rybníček	(Czech Republic) František Straka	(Serbia) Filip Bainović	Macron	Tipsport
Zemplín Michalovce	(Slovakia) Ján Sabol	(Slovakia) Vladimír Rusnák	(Slovakia) Igor Žofčák	Adidas	Tipsport, St. Nicolaus
Zlaté Moravce	(Slovakia) Karol Škula	(Slovakia) Ivan Galád	(Slovakia) Anton Sloboda	Erreà	Tipsport
Žilina	(Slovakia) Jozef Antošík	(Czech Republic) Jaroslav Hynek	(Slovakia) Tomáš Nemčík	Nike	Preto

=== Managerial changes ===
Team	Outgoing manager	Manner of departure	Date of vacancy	Position in table	Replaced by	Date of appointment
Tatran Liptovský Mikuláš	(Slovakia) Marek Petruš	Signed with Tatran Prešov	27 May 2022	Pre-season	(Slovakia) Jozef Kostelník	27 May 2022
DAC Dunajská Streda	(Portugal) João Janeiro	End of contract	31 May 2022	Pre-season	(Slovakia) Adrián Guľa	15 June 2022
Žilina	(Slovakia) Ivan Belák	End of interim spell	31 May 2022	Pre-season	(Czech Republic) Jaroslav Hynek	31 May 2022
Skalica	(Slovakia) Jozef Kostelník	Signed with Tatran Liptovský Mikuláš	1 June 2022	Pre-season	(Slovakia) Juraj Jarábek	1 June 2022
Trenčín	(Slovakia) Juraj Ančic	End of contract	7 June 2022	Pre-season	(Germany) Peter Hyballa	12 June 2022
Dukla Banská Bystrica	(Slovakia) Stanislav Varga	End of contract	1 July 2022	Pre-season	(Czech Republic) Michal Ščasný	3 July 2022
Trenčín	(Germany) Peter Hyballa	Released	27 July 2022	12	(Slovakia) Marián Zimen	27 July 2022
Zlaté Moravce	(Slovakia) Ján Kocian	End by own request	4 October 2022	11	(Slovakia) Ivan Galád	6 October 2022
Tatran Liptovský Mikuláš	(Slovakia) Jozef Kostelník	Released	14 November 2022	12	(Slovakia) Marek Fabuľa	22 November 2022
Skalica	(Slovakia) Juraj Jarábek	Released	16 December 2022	11	(Slovakia) Pavol Majerník	22 December 2022
Tatran Liptovský Mikuláš	(Slovakia) Marek Fabuľa	Released	28 February 2023	12	(Slovakia) Ondrej Desiatnik	10 March 2023
Trenčín	(Slovakia) Marián Zimen	Released	27 March 2023	10	(Czech Republic) František Straka	27 March 2023
Michalovce	(Slovakia) Norbert Hrnčár	Released	16 May 2023	10	(Slovakia) Vladimír Rusnák (interim)	16 May 2023

== Regular stage ==
=== League table ===
Pos	Team	Pld	W	D	L	GF	GA	GD	Pts	Qualification
1	DAC Dunajská Streda	22	14	6	2	39	17	+22	48	Qualification for the championship group
2	Slovan Bratislava	22	14	5	3	47	23	+24	47	Qualification for the championship group
3	Spartak Trnava	22	12	4	6	39	26	+13	40	Qualification for the championship group
4	Podbrezová	22	9	8	5	32	24	+8	35	Qualification for the championship group
5	Žilina	22	9	4	9	34	33	+1	31	Qualification for the championship group
6	Dukla Banská Bystrica	22	9	4	9	34	37	−3	31	Qualification for the championship group
7	Ružomberok	22	7	9	6	24	22	+2	30	Qualification for the relegation group
8	Zemplín Michalovce	22	6	5	11	22	34	−12	23	Qualification for the relegation group
9	Zlaté Moravce	22	4	11	7	28	35	−7	23	Qualification for the relegation group
10	Trenčín	22	5	7	10	20	33	−13	22	Qualification for the relegation group
11	Skalica	22	4	7	11	19	31	−12	19	Qualification for the relegation group
12	Tatran Liptovský Mikuláš	22	1	6	15	17	40	−23	9	Qualification for the relegation group

Source: Niké liga (in Slovak)
Rules for classification: 1) Points; 2) Head-to-head points; 3) Head-to-head goal difference; 4) Head-to-head away goals scored; 5) Play-off.

=== Results ===
Each team plays home-and-away against every other team in the league, for a total of 22 matches each.

Home \ Away	DAC	DUK	POD	RUŽ	SKA	SLO	TRN	TLM	TRE	ZMI	ZLM	ŽIL
DAC Dunajská Streda		3–0	2–1	1–0	2–1	1–1	1–0	2–1	1–2	1–0	3–0	5–2
Dukla Banská Bystrica	1–3		0–2	2–3	0–0	0–1	0–2	2–0	3–0	3–1	4–2	2–1
Podbrezová	0–0	3–1		0–2	0–2	2–1	3–1	1–0	2–0	2–2	0–0	3–1
Ružomberok	0–1	1–1	2–2		2–0	0–1	3–2	1–1	0–0	1–0	2–2	0–2
Skalica	1–1	1–2	1–1	0–2		1–4	1–1	3–0	2–0	0–0	0–2	1–0
Slovan Bratislava	1–1	2–2	3–1	2–0	3–0		4–1	1–0	4–0	4–2	4–1	3–1
Spartak Trnava	3–1	1–2	1–1	0–2	2–1	0–0		1–0	3–2	4–1	2–0	2–2
Tatran Liptovský Mikuláš	0–1	1–2	2–5	0–0	0–0	1–5	1–2		1–1	1–1	1–2	1–2
Trenčín	0–4	0–2	1–1	0–0	3–1	4–0	0–2	2–1		3–1	1–1	0–0
Zemplín Michalovce	0–2	2–0	1–0	1–1	3–1	0–1	0–4	1–2	2–0		0–0	3–2
Zlaté Moravce	2–2	4–4	1–1	2–2	2–2	1–1	0–3	1–1	1–0	0–1		4–0
Žilina	1–1	4–1	0–1	2–0	1–0	4–1	1–2	4–2	1–1	2–0	1–0	

Source: Niké liga (in Slovak)
Legend: Blue = home team win; Yellow = draw; Red = away team win.

== Championship group ==
Pos	Team	Pld	W	D	L	GF	GA	GD	Pts	Qualification	SLO	DAC	TRN	POD	DUK	ŽIL
1	Slovan Bratislava (C)	32	21	6	5	65	32	+33	69	Qualification for the Champions League first qualifying round	—	2–1	1–0	0–1	4–0	0–1
2	DAC Dunajská Streda	32	20	7	5	54	29	+25	67	Qualification for the Europa Conference League first qualifying round	2–3	—	3–1	2–1	1–0	1–0
3	Spartak Trnava	32	15	7	10	55	38	+17	52	Qualification for the Europa Conference League second qualifying round (Note: Spartak Trnava qualified for the Europa Conference League second qualifying round by winning the 2022–23 Slovak Cup.)	0–0	1–1	—	6–1	0–1	4–2
4	Podbrezová	32	13	8	11	44	44	0	47	Qualification for the Europa Conference League play-offs	1–2	2–0	0–3	—	1–2	3–2
5	Dukla Banská Bystrica	32	13	5	14	50	56	−6	44	Qualification for the Europa Conference League play-offs	1–2	2–3	2–0	3–1	—	1–1
6	Žilina (O)	32	11	6	15	49	53	−4	39	Qualification for the Europa Conference League play-offs	2–4	0–1	1–1	0–1	6–4	—

Source: Niké liga (in Slovak)
Rules for classification: 1) Points; 2) Head-to-head points; 3) Head-to-head goal difference; 4) Head-to-head away goals scored; 5) Play-off.
(C) Champions; (O) Play-off winners

== Relegation group ==
Pos	Team	Pld	W	D	L	GF	GA	GD	Pts	Qualification or relegation	RUŽ	SKA	TRE	ZMI	ZLM	TLM
1	Ružomberok	32	12	11	9	43	31	+12	47	Qualification for the Europa Conference League play-offs	—	1–2	4–1	2–0	2–0	3–0
2	Skalica	32	10	10	12	38	38	0	40		1–1	—	2–0	3–2	0–1	4–0
3	Trenčín	32	9	9	14	35	52	−17	36		0–3	1–3	—	3–3	2–1	2–2
4	Zemplín Michalovce	32	9	9	14	39	50	−11	36		2–2	1–1	0–2	—	1–0	0–0
5	Zlaté Moravce (O)	32	6	13	13	35	49	−14	31	Qualification for the relegation play-offs	1–0	0–0	1–2	2–5	—	0–1
6	Tatran Liptovský Mikuláš (R)	32	3	9	20	24	59	−35	18	Relegation to the 2. Liga	2–1	0–3	0–2	1–3	1–1	—

Source: Niké liga (in Slovak)
Rules for classification: 1) Points; 2) Head-to-head points; 3) Head-to-head goal difference; 4) Head-to-head away goals scored; 5) Play-off.
(O) Play-off winners; (R) Relegated

== Europa Conference League play-offs ==
The winner of the 2022–23 Slovak Cup, Spartak Trnava, finished in the top 3 in the league, which already secured them a spot in the 2023–24 UEFA Europa Conference League. As a result, a playoff was held for the final spot in the Europa Conference League, which involved the teams ranked in 4th–7th place at the conclusion of the regular season. The play-offs were one-off matches with extra time and penalties used to determine the winner if necessary, with the higher-ranked teams given home advantage against the lower-ranked teams (i.e. 3rd v. 7th and 5th v. 6th) in the semi-finals. The higher-ranked of the two semi-final winners also gained home advantage in the final. Žilina won the play-offs and earned a place in the Europa Conference League first qualifying round.

Semi-finals
5	Dukla Banská Bystrica	1
6	Žilina	3
4	Podbrezová	0
7	Ružomberok	3

Final
6	Žilina	3
7	Ružomberok	1

=== Semi-finals ===
23 May 2023
17:30 CEST (UTC+02:00)

Podbrezová	0–3	Ružomberok
Bakaľa (red card) 45+2'	Report	Madleňák 3'; Gerec 43'; Chrien 45+3' (pen.)

ZELPO Aréna, Podbrezová
Attendance: 1,130
Referee: Peter Kráľovič
23 May 2023
17:30 CEST (UTC+02:00)

Dukla Banská Bystrica	1–3	Žilina
Depetris 71'	Report	Rusnák 36'; Kopas 89'; Galčík 90+4'

Štadión SNP, Banská Bystrica
Attendance: 1,511
Referee: Michal Smolák

=== Final ===
26 May 2023
17:30 CEST (UTC+02:00)

Žilina	3–1	Ružomberok
Galčík 39'; Kaprálik 62'; Ďuriš 70'	Report	Madleňák 53'

Štadión pod Dubňom, Žilina
Attendance: 2,072
Referee: Michal Smolák

== Relegation play-offs ==
The team which finished 11th faced the 2nd team from 2. Liga for one spot in the top flight in the next season.

1st leg

23 May 2023
15:30 CEST (UTC+02:00)

Tatran Prešov	1–0	Zlaté Moravce
Baran 33'	Report

Futbalový štadión Ličartovce, Ličartovce
Attendance: 1,388
Referee: Ivan Kružliak

2nd leg

26 May 2023
20:30 CEST (UTC+02:00)

Zlaté Moravce	3–0	Tatran Prešov
Mondek 25', 90+1'; Ikugar 69'	Report	Dolný (penalty missed) 42'; Šimko (yellow card) 89' (yellow-red card) 90+6'

ViOn Aréna, Zlaté Moravce
Attendance: 3,120
Referee: Ivan Kružliak

Zlaté Moravce won 3–1 on aggregate.

== Season statistics ==
=== Top goalscorers ===
As of 20 May 2023

Rank	Player	Club	Goals
1	(Montenegro) Nikola Krstović	DAC Dunajská Streda	18
2	(Serbia) Aleksandar Čavrić	Slovan Bratislava	15
2	(Slovakia) Róbert Polievka	Dukla Banská Bystrica	15
4	(Nigeria) Abdulrahman Taiwo	Spartak Trnava	14
5	(Slovakia) Andrej Fábry	Skalica	11
6	(Slovakia) David Depetris^{1}	Dukla Banská Bystrica	9
6	(Slovakia) Vladimír Weiss Jr.	Slovan Bratislava	9
6	(Nigeria) Moses Cobnan	Podbrezová	9
6	(Slovakia) Adrián Kaprálik^{1}	Žilina	9
10	(Hungary) Zsolt Kalmár	DAC Dunajská Streda	8
10	(Slovakia) Timotej Jambor	Žilina	8
10	(Slovakia) Štefan Gerec^{1}	Ružomberok	8
10	(Slovakia) Dávid Ďuriš	Žilina	8

^{1} plus 1 play-off goal

==== Hat-tricks ====
Round	Player	For	Against	Result	Date	Ref
17	(Slovakia) Adrián Kaprálik^{4}	MŠK Žilina	Slovan Bratislava	4–1 (H)	6 November 2022	
1.CH	(Montenegro) Nikola Krstović	DAC Dunajská Streda	Dukla Banská Bystrica	2–3 (A)	12 March 2023	
10.CH	(Nigeria) Abdulrahman Taiwo	Spartak Trnava	MŠK Žilina	4–2 (H)	20 May 2023	

Note

^{4} Player scored 4 goals

=== Clean sheets ===
As of 20 May 2023

Rank	Player	Club	Clean sheets
1	(Slovakia) Samuel Petráš	DAC Dunajská Streda	10
2	(Slovakia) Martin Junas	Skalica	9
3	(Slovakia) Patrik Lukáč	Zlaté Moravce	8
3	(Slovakia) Richard Ludha	Podbrezová	8
3	(Slovakia) Benjamín Száraz	Zemplín Michalovce	8
6	(Slovakia) Ľubomír Belko	Žilina	7
6	(Slovakia) Dominik Takáč	Spartak Trnava	7
8	(Slovakia) Matúš Hruška	Dukla Banská Bystrica	6
8	(Slovakia) Adrián Chovan	Slovan Bratislava	6
10	(Slovakia) Michal Kukučka	Trenčín	5
10	(Slovakia) Ivan Krajčírik	Ružomberok	5
10	(Slovakia) Martin Trnovský	Slovan Bratislava	5

=== Discipline ===
As of 20 May 2023

==== Player ====
- Most yellow cards: 10
  - (Serbia) Lazar Stojsavljević (Trenčín)
- Most red cards: 2
  - (Nigeria) Chinonso Emeka (Trenčín)
  - (Slovakia) Erik Grendel (Podbrezová)
  - (Cape Verde) Kelvin Pires (Trenčín)

==== Club ====
- Most yellow cards: 82
  - Zlaté Moravce
- Most red cards: 8
  - Trenčín
- Fewest yellow cards: 46
  - Slovan Bratislava
- Fewest red cards: 0
  - Zlaté Moravce

== Awards ==
=== Monthly awards ===
Month	Player of the Month		Goal of the Month		References
Month	Player	Club	Player	Club	References
July	(Montenegro) Nikola Krstović	DAC Dunajská Streda	(Montenegro) Nikola Krstović	DAC Dunajská Streda	
August	(Slovakia) Róbert Polievka	Dukla Banská Bystrica	(Slovakia) Adam Kopas	Žilina	
September	(Slovakia) Dávid Ďuriš	Žilina	(Slovakia) Dávid Ďuriš	Žilina	
October	(Montenegro) Nikola Krstović	DAC Dunajská Streda	(Slovakia) Rastislav Václavík	Tatran Liptovský Mikuláš	
November	(Serbia) Aleksandar Čavrić	Slovan Bratislava	(Nigeria) Azeez Oseni	Spartak Trnava	
February	(Slovakia) Róbert Polievka	Dukla Banská Bystrica	(Slovakia) Róbert Polievka	Dukla Banská Bystrica	
March	(Montenegro) Nikola Krstović	DAC Dunajská Streda	(Hungary) Regő Szánthó	DAC Dunajská Streda	
April	(Serbia) Aleksandar Čavrić	Slovan Bratislava	(Slovakia) Vladimír Weiss Jr.	Slovan Bratislava	
May			(Slovakia) Adam Kopas	Žilina	

=== Annual awards ===
==== Team of the Season ====

Team of the Season was:

- Goalkeeper: (Slovakia) Ľubomír Belko (Žilina)
- Defenders: (Czech Republic) Jurij Medveděv (Slovan Bratislava), (Georgia (country)) Guram Kashia (Slovan Bratislava), (Slovakia) Marek Bartoš (Podbrezová), (Brazil) Lucas Lovat (Slovan Bratislava)
- Midfielders: (Serbia) Aleksandar Čavrić (Slovan Bratislava), (Slovakia) Juraj Kucka (Slovan Bratislava), (Slovakia) Miroslav Káčer (DAC Dunajská Streda), (Slovakia) Vladimír Weiss Jr. (Slovan Bratislava)
- Forwards: (Slovakia) Róbert Polievka (Dukla Banská Bystrica), (Montenegro) Nikola Krstović (DAC Dunajská Streda)

==== Individual awards ====
Manager of the Season

(Slovakia) Vladimír Weiss (Slovan Bratislava)

Player of the Season

(Slovakia) Vladimír Weiss Jr. (Slovan Bratislava)

Young Player of the Season

(Slovakia) Artur Gajdoš (Trenčín)

== See also ==
- 2022–23 Slovak Cup
- 2022–23 2. Liga (Slovakia)
- 2023–24 UEFA Champions League
- 2023–24 UEFA Europa Conference League
- List of Slovak football transfers summer 2022
- List of Slovak football transfers winter 2022–23
- List of foreign Slovak First League players
