= Samuel Kozlovský =

Slovak football defender

Personal information
- Date of birth: 19 November 1999 (age 26)
- Place of birth: Bratislava, Slovakia
- Height: 1.82 m (6 ft 0 in)
- Position: Left-back

Team information
- Current team: Slovan Bratislava
- Number: 2

Youth career
- 2007–2011: Iskra Petržalka
- 2011–2020: Slovan Bratislava
- 2019–2020: → Petržalka (loan)

Senior career*
Years	Team	Apps	(Gls)
2018–2021	Slovan Bratislava B	17	(0)
2018	Slovan Bratislava	0	(0)
2018–2019	→ Petržalka (loan)	23	(1)
2020–2021	→ Petržalka (loan)	24	(3)
2021–2024	AS Trenčín	64	(4)
2021	→ Dubnica nad Váhom	4	(0)
2024–2026	Widzew Łódź	50	(1)
2026–	Slovan Bratislava	8	(1)

International career^{‡}
2016	Slovakia U17	2	(0)
2017–2018	Slovakia U19	14	(1)
2018	Slovakia U20	3	(0)
2024–	Slovakia	1	(0)
- * Club domestic league appearances and goals as of 16:30, 24 October 2026 (UTC) ‡ National team caps and goals as of 8 September 2024

Samuel Kozlovský (born 19 January 1999) is a Slovak professional footballer who plays as a left-back for Slovak club Slovan Bratislava and the Slovakia national team.

== Club career ==
Kozlovský made his Fortuna Liga debut for AS Trenčín in an away fixture against ViOn Zlaté Moravce on 23 September 2021. He was featured in the starting XI and completed the entire 1–0 victory, secured by Samuel Lavrinčík's late debut league goal.

On 3 July 2024, Kozlovský joined Polish Ekstraklasa club Widzew Łódź on a two-year contract, with an option for another year.

On 25 May 2026, Widzew announced that Kozlovský would depart the club upon the expiration of his contract. Later that day, he signed a three-year deal with his boyhood club Slovan Bratislava.

== International career ==
On 8 September 2024, Kozlovský debuted for the Slovak senior squad in a Nations League match against Azerbaijan, coming as a substitute to Dávid Hancko in the extra time which resulted in 2–0 home victory for Slovakia.

== Career statistics ==
=== Club ===
As of match played 3 November 2026

Appearances and goals by club, season and competition
Club	Season	League			National cup (Note: Includes Slovak Cup, Polish Cup)		Europe		Other		Total	
Club	Season	Division	Apps	Goals	Apps	Goals	Apps	Goals	Apps	Goals	Apps	Goals
Slovan Bratislava B	2018–19	2. Liga	—		—		—		—		—	
Slovan Bratislava B	2019–20	2. Liga	17	0	—		—		—		17	0
Slovan Bratislava B	Total		17	0	—		—		—		17	0
Slovan Bratislava	2019–20	Slovak First Football League	0	0	2	0	—		—		2	0
Petržalka (loan)	2018–19	2. Liga	23	1	—		—		—		23	1
Petržalka (loan)	2019–20	2. Liga	1	0	—		—		—		1	0
Petržalka (loan)	2020–21	2. Liga	23	3	4	1	—		—		27	4
Petržalka (loan)	Total		24	3	4	1	—		—		28	4
AS Trenčín	2021–22	Slovak First Football League	11	1	3	0	—		—		11	1
AS Trenčín	2022–23	Slovak First Football League	22	0	7	1	—		—		29	1
AS Trenčín	2023–24	Slovak First Football League	31	3	0	0	—		—		31	3
AS Trenčín	Total		64	4	10	1	—		—		74	5
Dubnica nad Váhom (loan)	2021–22	2. Liga	4	0	—		—		—		4	0
Widzew Łódź	2024–25	Ekstraklasa	29	1	2	0	—		—		31	1
Widzew Łódź	2025–26	Ekstraklasa	21	0	2	0	—		—		23	0
Widzew Łódź	Total		50	1	4	0	—		—		54	1
Slovan Bratislava	2026–27	Slovak First Football League	8	1	2	0	1 (Note: Appearances in UEFA Champions League)	0	—		11	1
Career total			190	10	22	2	1	0	0	0	213	12

=== International ===
As of match played 8 September 2024

Appearances and goals by national team and year
National team	Year	Apps	Goals
Slovakia
Slovakia	2024	1	0
Total		1	0
