= Adam Kopas =

Slovak footballer

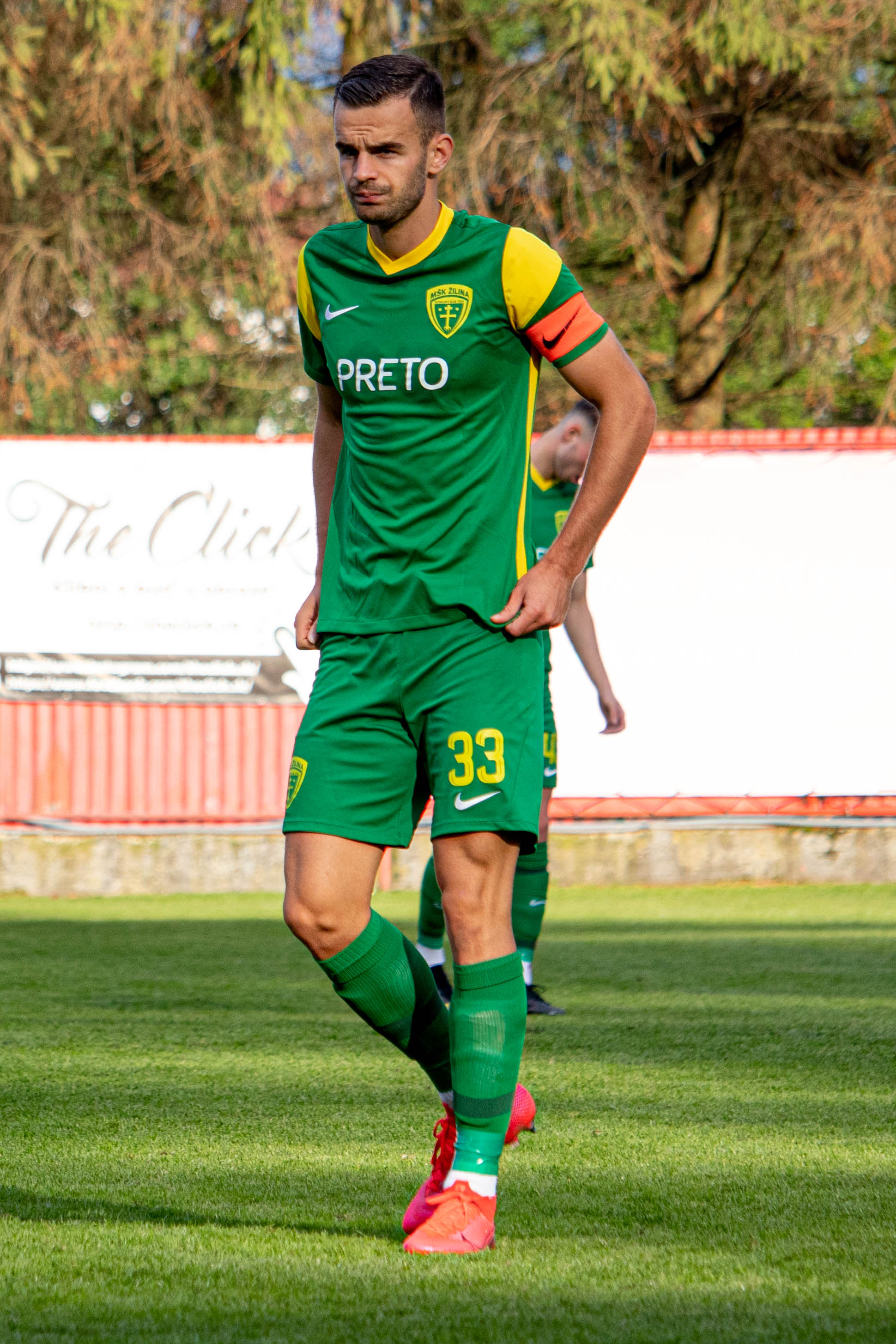
- Kopas in 2021 with Žilina

Personal information
- Full name: Adam Kopas
- Date of birth: 16 August 1999 (age 27)
- Place of birth: Žilina, Slovakia
- Height: 1.90 m (6 ft 3 in)
- Position: Centre back

Team information
- Current team: Chania
- Number: 33

Youth career
- 2009–2016: Žilina

Senior career*
Years	Team	Apps	(Gls)
2016–2025	Žilina B	91	(15)
2018–2024	Žilina	84	(6)
2024	→ Othellos Athienou (loan)	13	(0)
2024-2025	→ MFK Skalica	17	(0)
2025–2026	Dukla Banská Bystrica	4	(0)
2026-	Chania	6	(0)

International career^{‡}
2015–2016	Slovakia U17	7	(1)
2018	Slovakia U19	2	(0)
2019	Slovakia U21	1	(0)
- * Club domestic league appearances and goals as of 21 April 2026 ‡ National team caps and goals as of 3 May 2023

Adam Kopas (born 16 August 1999) is a Slovak professional footballer who currently plays for Super League Greece 2 club Chania, as a defender.

== Club career ==
=== MŠK Žilina ===
Kopas made his Fortuna Liga debut for Žilina against ViOn Zlaté Moravce on 2 March 2019. He played at pod Dubňom for 76 minutes before being replaced by Filip Balaj, who scored the winning goal 6 minutes later, to get Žilina the 2:1 victory.

== International career ==
Kopas was first recognised in a senior national team nomination on 16 March 2022 by Štefan Tarkovič as an alternate ahead of two international friendly fixtures against Norway and Finland. He did not penetrate into the shortlisted nomination by the end of the year, even under new manager Francesco Calzona, being omitted from nomination for September 2022–23 UEFA Nations League C fixtures and only being listed as an alternate for two November friendlies and prospective national team players' training camp in December.

== Honours ==
Individual

- Slovak Super Liga Goal of the Month: August 2022, May 2023,
