= Kingsley Madu =

Nigerian footballer

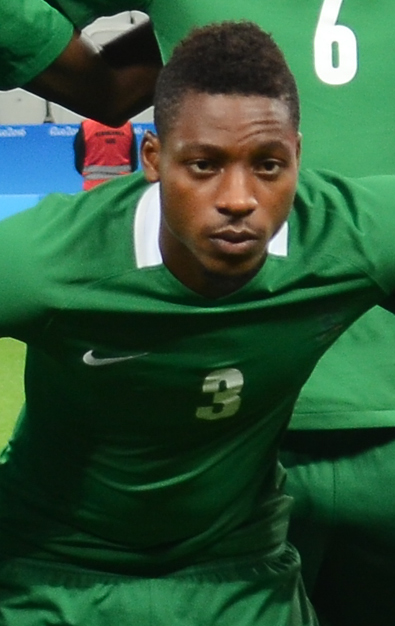
- Madu at the 2016 Olympics

Personal information
- Full name: Kingsley Madu
- Date of birth: 12 December 1995 (age 30)
- Place of birth: Kaduna, Nigeria
- Height: 1.71 m (5 ft 7 in)
- Position: Left back

Team information
- Current team: MFK Zemplín Michalovce
- Number: 13

Youth career
- GBS Academy

Senior career*
Years	Team	Apps	(Gls)
- El-Kanemi Warriors
2014–2016	AS Trenčín	60	(3)
2016–2019	Zulte Waregem	15	(0)
2019	→ KSV Roeselare (loan)	10	(1)
2019–2020	Odense	1	(0)
2021–2023	AS Trenčín	40	(2)
2025-	MFK Zemplín Michalovce	11	(0)

International career
2013–2014	Nigeria U20	10	(0)
2016	Nigeria Olympic	3	(0)
2015–2016	Nigeria	3	(0)
Medal record
Olympic Games
Bronze medal – third place	2016 Rio de Janeiro	Team
- * Club domestic league appearances and goals as of 13 December 2025

Kingsley Madu (born 12 December 1995) is a Nigerian footballer who plays as a left-back for Slovak club MFK Zemplín Michalovce. He represented the Nigerian national team on three occasions without scoring between 2016 and 2018.

After moving to Europe, Madu played in Slovakia for AS Trenčín before playing in Belgium and Denmark. He subsequently returned to Trenčin in 2021 before moving on to Slovak side Zemplín Michalovce in 2025.

== Club career ==
=== Early career ===
He started at El-Kanemi Warriors F.C. On 13 January 2014 Madu signed, along with Moses Simon, a three-year contract with the Slovak club AS Trenčín. On 30 August 2016 he signed a three-year contract with Zulte Waregem. In January 2019, he joined Roeselare on loan until the end of the season.

On 21 August 2019, Madu joined Danish Superliga club Odense on a one-year contract. Madu was released by Odense on 22 May 2020, having only made one appearance for the club.

=== Return to Trenčin ===
In March 2021, Madu returned to Slovakia, rejoining Trenčín, making his debut against Spartak Trnava on 3 April. His first goal after returning came in the 7th minute of a 3–1 away win against MŠK Žilina. On 29 May 2023, it was announced that Madu would leave the club at the end of his contract. In his second spell with the club, he scored and assist 2 goals in 40 league matches. After leaving Trenčin, Madu would not play football for another 18 months.

=== Michalovce ===
In 2025, Madu joined fellow league outfit MFK Zemplín Michalovce, signing a half-year contract with an option for a further year. He made his debut for Zemplín in February, playing the whole 90 minutes of a 1–1 draw against ŠK Slovan Bratislava.

== International career ==
Madu was selected by Nigeria for their 35-man provisional squad for the 2016 Summer Olympics.

== Career statistics ==
As of 11 October 2023

Appearances and goals by club, season and competition
Club	Season	League			National Cup		Continental (Note: Appearances in UEFA Champions League and UEFA Europa League)		Total	
Club	Season	Division	Apps	Goals	Apps	Goals	Apps	Goals	Apps	Goals
Trenčín	2013–14	Slovak First Football League	12	0	0	0	0	0	12	0
Trenčín	2014–15	Slovak First Football League	15	2	3	0	1	0	19	2
Trenčín	2015–16	Slovak First Football League	30	1	5	0	2	0	37	1
Trenčín	2016–17	Slovak First Football League	3	0	0	0	3	0	6	0
Trenčín	Total		60	3	8	0	6	0	74	3
Zulte Waregem	2016–17	Belgian Pro League	12	0	4	1	0	0	16	1
Zulte Waregem	2017–18	Belgian Pro League	3	0	1	0	2	0	6	0
Zulte Waregem	2018–19	Belgian Pro League	0	0	0	0	0	0	0	0
Zulte Waregem	Total		15	0	5	1	2	0	22	1
Roeselare	2018–19	Belgian First Division B	10	1	0	0	—		10	1
Odense	2019–20	Danish Superliga	1	0	0	0	0	0	1	0
Trenčín	2020–21	Slovak First Football League	4	0	0	0	0	0	4	0
Trenčín	2021–22	Slovak First Football League	26	1	4	0	0	0	30	1
Trenčín	2022–23	Slovak First Football League	10	1	0	0	0	0	10	1
Trenčín	Total		40	2	4	0	0	0	44	2
Career total			126	6	17	1	8	0	151	7

== Honours ==
=== Club ===
AS Trenčín

- Fortuna Liga: 2014–15, 2015–16
- Slovnaft Cup: 2014–15, 2015–16

Zulte Waregem

- Belgian Cup: 2016–17

=== International ===
Nigeria

- Olympic Bronze Medal: 2016
