= Njegoš Kupusović =

Serbian footballer (born 2001)

Personal information
- Date of birth: 22 February 2001 (age 25)
- Place of birth: Bijeljina, Bosnia and Herzegovina
- Height: 1.79 m (5 ft 10 in)
- Position: Forward

Team information
- Current team: Radnik Bijeljina
- Number: 9

Youth career
- 2012–2019: Red Star Belgrade

Senior career*
Years	Team	Apps	(Gls)
2019–2020	Red Star Belgrade	0	(0)
2019–2020	→ Erzgebirge Aue (loan)	3	(1)
2020–2021	Eintracht Braunschweig	6	(0)
2021	Türkgücü München	0	(0)
2021–2024	Trenčín	72	(19)
2021–2022	→ Dubnica (loan)	10	(2)
2024–2026	Sabah	21	(1)
2026–	Radnik Bijeljina	3	(2)

International career
2018	Serbia U17	5	(0)
2018	Serbia U18	3	(0)
2020	Serbia U19	2	(0)
- * Club domestic league appearances and goals as of 8 March 2026

Njegoš Kupusović (Serbian Cyrillic: Његош Купусовић; born 22 February 2001) is a Serbian professional footballer who plays as a forward for Bosnian Premier League club Radnik Bijeljina.

== Career ==
In June 2019, Kupusović joined German club Erzgebirge Aue from Red Star Belgrade on a season-long loan. He made his professional debut for Aue in the 2. Bundesliga on 31 May 2020, coming on as a substitute in the 85th minute for Florian Krüger in the away match against 1. FC Heidenheim, which finished as a 0–3 loss.

In August 2020, Kupusović moved to Eintracht Braunschweig on a two-year contract.

On 18 June 2021, Türkgücü München confirmed Kupusović's signature to play in the 3. Liga.

== Career statistics ==
As of match played 8 March 2026

Appearances and goals by club, season and competition
Club	Season	League			National cup (Note: Includes Slovak Cup, Azerbaijan Cup, Bosnian Cup)		Continental		Other		Total	
Club	Season	Division	Apps	Goals	Apps	Goals	Apps	Goals	Apps	Goals	Apps	Goals
Erzgebirge Aue (loan)	2019–20	2. Bundesliga	3	1	—		—		—		3	1
Eintracht Braunschweig	2020–21	2. Bundesliga	6	0	—		—		—		6	0
Türkgücü München	2021–22	3. Liga	0	0	—		—		1 (Note: Appearance in the Bavarian Cup)	0	1	0
Trenčín	2021–22	Slovak First League	13	8	3	0	—		—		16	8
Trenčín	2022–23	Slovak First League	29	1	5	0	—		—		34	1
Trenčín	2023–24	Slovak First League	30	10	—		—		—		30	10
Trenčín	Total		72	19	8	0	—		—		80	19
Dubnica (loan)	2021–22	2. Liga	10	2	—		—		—		10	2
Sabah	2024–25	Azerbaijan Premier League	21	1	2	1	2 (Note: Appearances in UEFA Conference League)	0	—		25	2
Sabah	2025–26	Azerbaijan Premier League	0	0	—		4 (Note: Two appearances in UEFA Europa League, two appearances in UEFA Conference League)	0	—		4	0
Sabah	Total		21	1	2	1	6	0	—		29	2
Radnik Bijeljina	2025–26	Bosnian Premier League	3	2	1	0	—		—		4	2
Radnik Bijeljina	2026–27	Bosnian Premier League	0	0	0	0	—		—		0	0
Radnik Bijeljina	Total		3	2	1	0	—		—		4	2
Career total			115	25	11	1	6	0	1	0	133	26

== Honours ==
Sabah

- Azerbaijan Cup: 2024–25
