= Manasse Kianga =

South African footballer (born 2002)

Personal information
- Date of birth: 18 March 2002 (age 24)
- Place of birth: Johannesburg, South Africa
- Position: Forward

Team information
- Current team: Slovan Bratislava
- Number: 19

Senior career*
Years	Team	Apps	(Gls)
2019–2024	Rossington Main	90	(41)
2020–2021	Grantham Town	14	(0)
2021–2022	Worksop Town	3	(0)
2022	Sheffield F.C.	15	(0)
2023	Stocksbridge Park Steels	1	(0)
2024	Clay Cross Town	2	(0)
2025–2026	Lokomotíva Košice	9	(3)
2026–	Slovan Bratislava B	15	(4)
2026–	Slovan Bratislava	5	(2)
- * Club domestic league appearances and goals as of 26 October 2026

Manasse Kianga (born 18 March 2002) is a South African professional footballer who plays as a forward or winger for Slovak Niké Liga club ŠK Slovan Bratislava.

Kianga played in the English non-league system for multiple teams before moving to Slovakia in 2025, when he joined Lokomotíva Košice.

== Career ==
=== Early career ===
Kianga joined Rossington Main in 2019 and left the club in 2024 after several spells with the team. He helped the club gain promotion from Division One of the Northern Counties East Football League (10th tier) in the 2022–23 season. He made 115 appearances and scored 51 goals in all competitions for Rossington Main, including friendlies. According to the club's historical statistics, he made 104 appearances and scored 44 goals in official competitive matches.

During the 2020–21 and 2021–22 seasons, he also played for Grantham Town in the Northern Premier League Premier Division (seventh tier).

In the 2021–22 season, Kianga also featured in the Northern Premier League Division One East (eighth tier), playing for Worksop Town and Sheffield F.C..

Kianga joined National League North side Bradford (Park_Avenue) A.F.C. on trial during the pre-season of the 2022-23 season.

In the 2022–23 season, Kianga also played in a sole match for Stocksbridge Park Steels F.C. in the Northern Premier League Division One East (eighth tier).

Kianga joined Northern Premier League Premier Division side Guiseley A.F.C. on trial during the pre-season of the 2024-25 season. In the 2024–25 season, Kianga also featured in the United Counties League Division One (tenth tier), playing for Clay Cross Town F.C..

=== Lokomotíva Košice ===
Kianga joined Lokomotíva Košice for the 2025–26 season. He missed the club's first five matches—four league matches and one cup match—because of visa issues. He subsequently played the full 90 minutes in each of the team's remaining nine matches before the winter break, scoring three goals. He also scored once in two appearances in the Slovak Cup.

=== Slovan Bratislava ===
Kianga joined Slovan Bratislava in early 2026, initially representing the club's reserve team in the Slovak second division.

His move to Slovakia was facilitated by former Slovak international and Chelsea player Milan Lalkovič, who had met Kianga while working as a youth coach in England and recommended that he continue his career in Slovakia. Lalkovič's father, Milan Lalkovič Sr., was managing Lokomotíva Košice at the beginning of the 2025–26 season.

Lalkovič later stated that he believed Kianga had the talent to reach the Slovak top flight within a year.

After impressing with Slovan B, Kianga was promoted to the first team at the beginning of the 2026–27 season. The promotion came amid injuries to the first team's three main forwards: Andraž Šporar, Nino Marcelli and Tigran Barseghyan. On 26 July 2026, Kianga made his Niké Liga debut in a 4–0 away win over Dukla Banská Bystrica, scoring one goal and providing an assist.

On 4 August 2026, Kianga made his UEFA Champions League debut for Slovan Bratislava in the third qualifying round against Swedish champions Mjällby AIF. Coming on as a second-half substitute, he scored the winning goal in stoppage time to secure a 2–1 away victory in the first leg. The goal was his first in European club competition and attracted attention in the Slovak media.

Kianga was omitted from Slovan's UEFA Champions League squad for the league phase following the late signing of central defender Sahmkou Camara. However, he continued to travel with the team for Champions League matches.

== Career statistics ==
As of match played 26 October 2026

Appearances and goals by club, season and competition
Club	Season	League			National cup (Note: Includes FA Cup, Slovak Cup)		Continental		Other		Total	
Club	Season	Division	Apps	Goals	Apps	Goals	Apps	Goals	Apps	Goals	Apps	Goals
Rossington Main	2019–20	NCEL Division One	14	6	—		—		1 (Note: Appearane in NCEL League Cup)	0	15	6
Rossington Main	2020–21	NCEL Division One	3	1	—		—		—		3	1
Rossington Main	2021–22	NCEL Division One	2	0	—		—		—		2	0
Rossington Main	2022–23	NCEL Division One	16	8	—		—		3 (Note: Two appearances in NCEL Division One promotion play-offs, one appearance in Sheffield & Hallamshire Senior Cup)	0	19	8
Rossington Main	2023–24	NCEL Premier Division	38	13	2	1	—		8 (Note: Three appearances in NCEL League Cup, two appearances in FA Vase, two appearances in Sheffield & Hallamshire Senior Cup, one appearance in NCEL Premier Division promotion play-offs)	3	48	17
Rossington Main	2024–25	NCEL Premier Division	17	13	—		—		1	0	18	13
Rossington Main	Total		90	41	2	1	0	0	13	3	105	45
Grantham Town	2020–21	NPL Premier Division	3	0	1	1	—		1 (Note: One appearance in FA Trophy)	0	5	1
Grantham Town	2021–22	NPL Premier Division	11	0	1	0	—		—		12	0
Grantham Town	Total		14	0	2	1	0	0	1	0	17	1
Worksop Town	2021–22	NPL Division One East	3	0	—		—		1 (Note: Appearance in Sheffield & Hallamshire Senior Cup)	0	4	0
Sheffield F.C.	2021–22	NPL Division One East	15	0	—		—		—		15	0
Stocksbridge Park Steels	2022–23	NPL Division One East	1	0	—		—		—		1	0
Clay Cross Town	2024–25	UCL Division One	2	0	—		—		—		2	0
Lokomotíva Košice	2025–26	3. Liga	9	3	2	1	—		—		11	4
Slovan Bratislava B	2025–26	2. Liga	9	3	—		—		—		9	3
Slovan Bratislava B	2026–27	2. Liga	6	1	—		—		—		6	1
Slovan Bratislava B	Total		15	4	0	0	0	0	0	0	15	4
Slovan Bratislava	2026–27	Slovak First League	5	2	1	2	3 (Note: Appearances in UEFA Champions League qualifying rounds)	1	—		9	5
Career total			154	50	7	5	3	1	15	3	179	59
