= 2026–27 ŠK Slovan Bratislava season =

Slovan Bratislava
2026–27 season
- Owner: Ivan Kmotrík
- Manager: Yaya Touré
- Stadium: Tehelné pole
- Slovak 1st League: 2nd
- Slovak Cup: Fourth round
- UEFA Champions League: League phase
- Top goalscorer: League: Rahim Ibrahim; Andraž Šporar (4 goals each); All: Andraž Šporar (6 goals)
Home colours	Away colours	Third colours
- All statistics correct as of 28 October 2026.

The 2026–27 season is the 108th season in the history of ŠK Slovan Bratislava and the club's 21st consecutive season in the top flight of Slovak football. In addition to the domestic league, Slovan are also scheduled to participate in this season's edition of the Slovak Cup and the UEFA Champions League.

Slovan entered the season as defending Slovak champions, having won the Slovak First Football League for the eighth consecutive time in 2025–26. The title further extended the club's domestic record for the longest championship-winning streak in Slovak football history.

Following the end of the previous season, Vladimír Weiss left the club to take charge of the Slovakia national team, ending his five-year spell as Slovan manager. He was replaced by former Ivory Coast international and Manchester City midfielder Yaya Touré, with Irishman Darren O'Dea and Frenchman Serge Costa appointed as his assistants.

The campaign also marks a significant transition in the playing squad, following the departures of several long-serving players, including Guram Kashia, Róbert Mak and Vladimír Weiss Jr.

== Players ==
As of 5 September 2026

Squad No.	Name	Nationality	Position(s)	Date of birth (age)	Signed from / Previous club	Since
Goalkeepers
1	Aleksandar Popović	(Serbia)	GK	27 September 1999 (age 27)	(Slovakia) DAC Dunajská Streda	2026
44	Matúš Macík	(Slovakia)	GK	19 May 1993 (age 33)	(Czech Republic) Sigma Olomouc	2025
71	Dominik Takáč	(Slovakia)	GK	12 January 1999 (age 27)	(Slovakia) Spartak Trnava	2024
Defenders
2	Samuel Kozlovský	(Slovakia)	LB	19 November 1999 (age 26)	(Poland) Widzew Łódź	2026
6	Kevin Wimmer	(Austria)	CB / LB	15 November 1992 (age 33)	(Austria) Rapid Wien	2023
12	Kenan Bajrić	(Slovenia)	CB / DM	20 December 1994 (age 31)	(Slovenia) Olimpija Ljubljana	2018
15	Svetozar Marković	(Serbia)	CB	23 March 2000 (age 26)	(Czech Republic) Viktoria Plzeň	2026
17	Jurij Medveděv	(Czech Republic) (Kazakhstan)	RB	18 June 1996 (age 30)	(Russia) Sochi	2024
26	Robert Tománek	(Slovakia)	CB	22 June 2006 (age 20)	Youth system	2026
28	César Blackman	(Panama)	RB / RW	2 April 1998 (age 28)	(Slovakia) DAC Dunajská Streda	2023
49	Sahmkou Camara	(Guinea)	CB / RB	10 June 2003 (age 23)	(Czech Republic) Slavia Prague (loan)	2026
57	Sandro Cruz	(Angola)	LB	12 May 2001 (age 25)	(Portugal) Gil Vicente	2025
Midfielders
3	Peter Pokorný	(Slovakia)	DM / CM / CB	8 August 2001 (age 25)	(Poland) Śląsk Wrocław	2025
5	Rahim Ibrahim	(Ghana)	CM	10 June 2001 (age 25)	(Slovakia) Trenčín	2025
8	Artur Gajdoš	(Slovakia)	CAM	20 January 2004 (age 22)	(Slovakia) Trenčín	2024
11	Tigran Barseghyan	(Armenia)	RW / LW	22 September 1993 (age 33)	(Kazakhstan) Astana	2022
18	Nino Marcelli	(Slovakia)	LW / RW	29 May 2005 (age 21)	Youth system	2023
20	Alen Mustafić	(Bosnia and Herzegovina)	CM	5 July 1999 (age 27)	(Denmark) OB	2024
21	Suleiman Camara	(The Gambia)	RW / LW	7 December 2001 (age 24)	(Spain) Racing Santander	2026
24	Matúš Tomáško	(Slovakia)	LW / LB	30 November 2009 (age 16)	Youth system	2026
25	Leo Hofstädter	(Slovakia)	CAM	9 October 2009 (age 17)	Youth system	2026
29	Alexej Maroš	(Slovakia)	LW / RW / CAM	3 January 2005 (age 21)	Youth system	2026
70	Cristian Martínez	(Panama)	DM / CM / CAM	6 February 1997 (age 29)	(Israel) Ironi Kiryat Shmona	2026
77	Danylo Ihnatenko	(Ukraine)	CM / DM / CB	13 March 1997 (age 29)	(France) Bordeaux	2024
88	Daiki Matsuoka	(Japan)	CM / DM	1 June 2001 (age 25)	(Japan) Avispa Fukuoka (loan)	2026
97	Kelvin Ofori	(Ghana)	RW / LW / CAM	27 July 2001 (age 25)	(Slovakia) Spartak Trnava	2025
Forwards
9	Mykola Kukharevych	(Ukraine)	ST	7 July 2001 (age 25)	(Wales) Swansea City	2025
13	Roman Čerepkai	(Slovakia)	ST / LW	6 April 2002 (age 24)	(Slovakia) Košice	2026
14	Alasana Yirajang	(The Gambia)	LW / RW / ST	12 November 2004 (age 21)	(Slovakia) Podbrezová	2025
19	Manasse Kianga	(England)	ST / RW	18 March 2002 (age 24)	Youth system	2026
30	Adam Griger	(Slovakia)	ST	16 March 2004 (age 22)	(Czech Republic) Hradec Králové (loan)	2026
99	Andraž Šporar (captain)	(Slovenia)	ST	27 February 1994 (age 32)	(Turkey) Alanyaspor	2025

== Transfers and loans ==
=== Transfers in ===
Date	Position	Nationality	Name	From / Previous club	Fee	Ref.
20 May 2026	GK	(Serbia)	Aleksandar Popović	(Slovakia) DAC Dunajská Streda	Free transfer	
25 May 2026	DF	(Slovakia)	Samuel Kozlovský	(Poland) Widzew Łódź	Free transfer	
30 June 2026	MF	(Ghana)	Kelvin Ofori	(Slovenia) Olimpija Ljubljana	Loan return	
30 June 2026	MF	(Slovakia)	Filip Lichý	(Slovakia) Košice	Loan return	
30 June 2026	DF	(Czech Republic)	Jurij Medveděv	(Slovakia) Tatran Prešov	Loan return	
30 June 2026	MF	(Bosnia and Herzegovina)	Alen Mustafić	(Slovakia) Komárno	Loan return	
19 July 2026	MF	(Panama)	Cristian Martínez	(Israel) Ironi Kiryat Shmona	€700,000	
3 August 2026	MF	(The Gambia)	Suleiman Camara	(Spain) Racing Santander	€1,000,000	
17 August 2026	FW	(Slovakia)	Roman Čerepkai	(Slovakia) Košice	€500,000	

=== Loans in ===
Start date	Position	Nationality	Name	From	End date	Ref.
2 September 2026	DF	(Guinea)	Sahmkou Camara	(Czech Republic) Slavia Prague	30 June 2027	

=== Transfers out ===
Date	Position	Nationality	Name	To / Next club	Fee	Ref.
15 June 2026	MF	(Slovakia)	Maxim Mateáš	(Slovakia) Košice	Undisclosed	
30 June 2026	DF	(Cameroon)	Sidoine Fogning	(Portugal) Boavista	Loan return	
30 June 2026	DF	(Georgia (country))	Guram Kashia	End of contract		
30 June 2026	MF	(Slovakia)	Filip Lichý	End of contract		
5 July 2026	MF	(Slovakia)	Filip Lichý	(Slovakia) Košice	Free transfer	
30 June 2026	FW	(Slovakia)	Róbert Mak	End of contract (retired)		
30 June 2026	GK	(Slovakia)	Martin Trnovský	End of contract		
2 June 2026	GK	(Slovakia)	Martin Trnovský	(Slovakia) Podbrezová	Free transfer	
30 June 2026	MF	(Slovakia)	Vladimír Weiss Jr.	End of contract (retired)		
14 July 2026	MF	(Croatia)	Niko Janković	(Croatia) Rijeka	Loan return	
13 August 2026	DF	(Togo)	Sharani Zuberu	(Israel) Hapoel Jerusalem	Free transfer	

=== Loans out ===
Start date	Position	Nationality	Name	To	End date	Ref.

== Friendlies ==
Win Draw Loss

=== Pre-season ===
Wed, 24 June 2026 Friendly	Grazer AK (Austria)	0–1	(Slovakia) Slovan Bratislava	Windischgarsten, Austria
17:00 CEST (UTC+02:00)		Report	Janković 31'	Stadium: Sportanlage Windischgarsten

Mon, 29 June 2026 Friendly	Red Star Belgrade (Serbia)	1–1	(Slovakia) Slovan Bratislava	Windischgarsten, Austria
17:00 CEST (UTC+02:00)		Report		Stadium: Sportanlage Windischgarsten

Sat, 4 July 2026 Friendly	Puskás Akadémia (Hungary)	1–0	(Slovakia) Slovan Bratislava	Felcsút, Hungary
17:00 CEST (UTC+02:00)		Report		Stadium: Pancho Aréna

Sat, 11 July 2026 Friendly	Slavia Prague (Czech Republic)	0–1	(Slovakia) Slovan Bratislava	Melk, Austria
17:00 CEST (UTC+02:00)		Report	Šporar 4'

Thu, 16 July 2026 Friendly	Slovan Bratislava (Slovakia)	3–2	(Cyprus) Pafos	Bratislava, Slovakia
18:15 CEST (UTC+02:00)		Report		Stadium: Tehelné pole Attendance: 5,612

== Competition overview ==
Competition	First match	Last match	Starting round	Final position	Record							
Competition	First match	Last match	Starting round	Final position	Pld	W	D	L	GF	GA	GD	Win %
Slovak First Football League	26 July 2026	TBD	Matchday 1	TBD	12	7	3	2	28	12	+16	58.33
Slovak Cup	2 September 2026	TBD	Second round	TBD	2	2	0	0	11	1	+10	100.00
UEFA Champions League	21 July 2026	TBD	Second qualifying round	TBD	9	4	2	3	11	17	−6	44.44
Total					23	13	5	5	50	30	+20	56.52

Last updated: 28 October 2026
Source: Competitions

== Slovak First Football League ==
=== League table ===
==== Regular stage ====
Pos	Team	Pld	W	D	L	GF	GA	GD	Pts	Qualification
1	DAC Dunajská Streda	13	11	2	0	39	7	+32	35	Qualification for the championship group
2	Slovan Bratislava	13	8	3	2	30	13	+17	27	Qualification for the championship group
3	Žilina	13	7	4	2	33	25	+8	25	Qualification for the championship group
4	Spartak Trnava	13	6	4	3	26	17	+9	22	Qualification for the championship group
5	Košice	13	4	6	3	30	23	+7	18	Qualification for the championship group
6	Podbrezová	13	5	2	6	19	23	−4	17	Qualification for the championship group

Updated to match(es) played on 1 November 2026. Source: Niké liga (in Slovak)
Rules for classification: 1) Points; 2) Head-to-head points; 3) Head-to-head goal difference; 4) Head-to-head away goals scored; 5) Play-off.

=== Results summary ===
Overall								Home						Away					
Pld	W	D	L	GF	GA	GD	Pts	W	D	L	GF	GA	GD	W	D	L	GF	GA	GD
12	7	3	2	28	12	+16	24	2	2	1	14	7	+7	5	1	1	14	5	+9

=== Results by matchday ===
Round	1	2	4	5	6	7	8	9	10	11	12	3	13	14	15	16	17	18	19	20	21	22
Ground	A	H	H	A	H	A	H	A	A	A	H	A	A	H	A	H	A	H	A	H	H	H
Result	W	W	W	W	L	L	D	W	D	W	D	W										
Position	1	1	2	2	4	4	4	4	4	4	4	2										
Points	3	6	9	12	12	12	13	16	17	20	21	24										

A = Away; H = Home; W = Win; D = Draw; L = Loss; P = Postponed

=== Matches ===
Regular stage

Sun, 26 July 2026 1	Dukla Banská Bystrica	0–4	Slovan Bratislava	Banská Bystrica
19:00 CEST (UTC+02:00)		Report (Slovan); Report (Niké liga)	Bajrić 13'; Kianga 24'; Yirajang 35'; Kukharevych 52'	Stadium: Štadión SNP; Attendance: 5,270; Referee: Filip Glova

Sat, 1 August 2026 2	Slovan Bratislava	3–0	Podbrezová	Bratislava
18:00 CEST (UTC+02:00)	Ibrahim 7'; Mustafić 68', 80'	Report (Slovan); Report (Niké liga)		Stadium: Tehelné pole Attendance: 5,457

Sat, 15 August 2026 4	Slovan Bratislava	5–0	Ružomberok	Bratislava
18:00 CEST (UTC+02:00)	Kozlovský 10'; Alexej Maroš 63'; Matsuoka 70'; Kianga 86'; Barseghyan 89'	Report (Slovan); Report (Niké liga)		Stadium: Tehelné pole Attendance: 6,476

Sat, 22 August 2026 5	Košice	1–2	Slovan Bratislava	Košice
20:30 CEST (UTC+02:00)	Lichý 57'	Report (Slovan); Report (Niké liga)	Markovič 9'; Ibrahim 26'	Stadium: Košická futbalová aréna Attendance: 9,108

Sun, 30 August 2026 6	Slovan Bratislava	1–2	Zemplín Michalovce	Bratislava
17:00 CEST (UTC+02:00)	Matsuoka 15'	Report (Slovan); Report (Niké liga)	Danek 6'; Luka Lemishko 55'	Stadium: Tehelné pole Attendance: 8,202

Sat, 5 September 2026 7	DAC Dunajská Streda	2–0	Slovan Bratislava	Dunajská Streda
20:30 CEST (UTC+02:00)	Alioune Sylla 78'; Abdoulaye Gueye 90'	Report (Slovan); Report (Niké liga)		Stadium: MOL Aréna; Attendance: 8,510; Referee: Lukáš Dzivjak

Sun, 13 September 2026 8	Slovan Bratislava	3–3	Žilina	Bratislava
19:00 CEST (UTC+02:00)	Šporar 47', 82'; Mustafić 90+1'	Report (Slovan); Report (Niké liga)	Roginić 35'; Bzdyl 51'; Bilalović 84'	Stadium: Tehelné pole Attendance: 8,601; Referee: Erik Gemzický

Sat, 19 September 2026 9	Komárno	1–2	Slovan Bratislava	Komárno
20:30 CEST (UTC+02:00)	Bernát 46'	Report (Slovan); Report (Niké liga)	Šporar 50', 86'	Stadium: Mestský štadión Komárno; Attendance: 4,152; Referee: Martin Dohál

Sat, 10 October 2026 10	Skalica	1–1	Slovan Bratislava	Skalica
15:30 CEST (UTC+02:00)	Daniel 54'	Report (Slovan); Report (Niké liga)	Barseghyan 60'	Stadium: Štadión MFK Skalica; Attendance: 2,768; Referee: Boris Marhefka

Sat, 17 October 2026 11	Spartak Trnava	0–3	Slovan Bratislava	Trnava
18:00 CEST (UTC+02:00)		Report (Slovan); Report (Niké liga)	Ibrahim 19', 80'; Griger 34'	Stadium: Štadión Antona Malatinského; Attendance: 16,541; Referee: Michal Očenáš

Sat, 24 October 2026 12	Slovan Bratislava	2–2	Dukla Banská Bystrica	Bratislava
15:30 CEST (UTC+02:00)	Bajrić 53'; Barseghyan 76' (pen.)	Report (Slovan); Report (Niké liga)	Hanes 88', 90+3'	Stadium: Tehelné pole Attendance: 6,407; Referee: Filip Glova

Wed, 28 October 2026 3	Trenčín	0–2	Slovan Bratislava	Trenčín
18:00 CET (UTC+01:00)		Report		Stadium: Štadión Sihoť; Attendance: 2,742; Referee: Peter Kráľovič

Sat, 31 October 2026 13	Podbrezová	–	Slovan Bratislava	Podbrezová
18:00 CET (UTC+01:00)		Report		Stadium: ZELPO Aréna

Sat, 7 November 2026 14	Slovan Bratislava	–	Trenčín	Bratislava
15:30 CET (UTC+01:00)		Report		Stadium: Tehelné pole

21–22 November 2026 15	Ružomberok	–	Slovan Bratislava	Ružomberok
		Report		Stadium: Štadión pod Čebraťom

28–29 November 2026 16	Slovan Bratislava	–	Košice	Bratislava
		Report		Stadium: Tehelné pole

5–6 December 2026 17	Zemplín Michalovce	–	Slovan Bratislava	Michalovce
		Report		Stadium: Mestský futbalový štadión

12–13 December 2026 18	Slovan Bratislava	–	DAC Dunajská Streda	Bratislava
		Report		Stadium: Tehelné pole

6–7 February 2027 19	Žilina	–	Slovan Bratislava	Žilina
		Report		Stadium: Štadión pod Dubňom

13–14 February 2027 20	Slovan Bratislava	–	Komárno	Bratislava
		Report		Stadium: Tehelné pole

20–21 February 2027 21	Slovan Bratislava	–	Skalica	Bratislava
		Report		Stadium: Tehelné pole

27–28 February 2027 22	Slovan Bratislava	–	Spartak Trnava	Bratislava
		Report		Stadium: Tehelné pole

== Slovak Cup ==
Wed, 2 September 2026 Second round	Slovan Nitra-Chrenová (6)	0–8	Slovan Bratislava (1)	Nitra
18:00 CEST (UTC+02:00)		Report		Stadium: Štadión pod Zoborom; Attendance: 3,940

Wed, 16 September 2026 Third round	FC Nitra (3)	1–3	Slovan Bratislava (1)	Nitra
18:30	Hambálek 8'	Report	Barseghyan 39'; Čerepkai 86'; Matsuoka 90+4'	Stadium: Štadión pod Zoborom; Attendance: 6,831

== UEFA Champions League ==
=== Second qualifying round ===
Tue, 21 July 2026 First leg	Iberia 1999 (Georgia (country))	0–2	(Slovakia) Slovan Bratislava	Tbilisi, Georgia
18:00 CEST		Report	Šporar 25'; Yirajang 31'	Stadium: Mikheil Meskhi Stadium; Attendance: 7,119; Referee: Lukas Fähndrich (Switzerland)

Wed, 29 July 2026 Second leg	Slovan Bratislava (Slovakia)	1–1 (3–1 agg.)	(Georgia (country)) Iberia 1999	Bratislava, Slovakia
20:15 CEST	Kukharevych 44'	Report	Sikharulashvili 51'	Stadium: Tehelné pole Attendance: 17,867; Referee: Christian-Petru Ciochirca (Austria)

=== Third qualifying round ===
Tue, 4 August 2026 First leg	Mjällby AIF (Sweden)	1–2	(Slovakia) Slovan Bratislava	Hällevik, Sweden
18:00 CEST	Stroud 61' (pen.)	Report	Camara 78'; Kianga 90+4'	Stadium: Strandvallen; Attendance: 3,327; Referee: Nick Walsh (Scotland)

Tue, 11 August 2026 Second leg	Slovan Bratislava (Slovakia)	2–0 (4–1 agg.)	(Sweden) Mjällby AIF	Bratislava, Slovakia
20:15 CEST	Camara 47'; Yirajang 78'	Report		Stadium: Tehelné pole Attendance: 21,350; Referee: Michael Oliver (England)

=== Play-off round ===
The play-off round draw was held on 3 August 2026.

Wed, 19 August 2026 First leg	Slovan Bratislava (Slovakia)	1–1	(Slovenia) Celje	Bratislava, Slovakia
21:00 CEST	Čerepkai 15'	Report	Avdyli 41'	Stadium: Tehelné pole Attendance: 21,640; Referee: Felix Zwayer (Germany)

Wed, 26 August 2026 Second leg	Celje (Slovenia)	1–2 (a.e.t.) (2–3 agg.)	(Slovakia) Slovan Bratislava	Celje, Slovenia
21:00 CEST	Širvys (yellow card) 16'; Sešlar 34' (pen.), (yellow card) 120+1'; Avdyli (yellow card) 58'; Tutyškinas (yellow card) 84'; Verbič (yellow card) 118'; Kotnik (red card) 119'	Report	Šporar 18'; Cruz (yellow card) 54'; Martínez 100'	Stadium: Stadion Z'dežele; Attendance: 11,500; Referee: Alejandro Hernández Hernández (Spain)

=== League phase ===
The league phase draw was held on 27 August 2026.

Pos	Team	Pld	W	D	L	GF	GA	GD	Pts
32	(Czech Republic) Slavia Prague	3	0	1	2	4	7	−3	1
33	(Norway) Viking	3	0	1	2	5	9	−4	1
34	(France) Lille	4	0	1	3	4	10	−6	1
35	(Portugal) Porto	3	0	0	3	2	6	−4	0
36	(Slovakia) Slovan Bratislava	4	0	0	4	1	17	−16	0

Updated to match(es) played on 3 November 2026. Source: UEFA
Rules for classification: League phase tiebreakers

Round	1	2	3	4	5	6	7	8
Ground	A	H	A	A	H	H	A	H
Result	L	L	L	L				
Position	35	36	36	36				
Points	0	0	0	0				

Updated to match(es) played on 2 November 2026. Source: UEFA
A = Away; H = Home; W = Win; D = Draw; L = Loss

==== Matches ====
Wed, 9 September 2026 1	Paris Saint-Germain (France)	6–1	(Slovakia) Slovan Bratislava	Paris, France
21:00	Dembélé 17', 23'; Torres 31', 47', 57'; Fabián 87'	Report	Blackman (yellow card) 53'; Su. Camara 58'	Stadium: Parc des Princes; Attendance: 47,511; Referee: Mykola Balakin (Ukraine)

Wed, 14 October 2026 2	Slovan Bratislava (Slovakia)	0–3	(Germany) VfB Stuttgart	Bratislava, Slovakia
21:00	Pokorný (yellow card) 86'	Report	Hendriks (yellow card) 12'; El Khannouss (yellow card) 26'; Undav 29'; Cruz 64' (o.g.); Vagnoman (yellow card) 77'; Demirović 90'	Stadium: Tehelné pole Attendance: 19,725; Referee: Irfan Peljto (Bosnia and Herzegovina)

Tue, 20 October 2026 3	Roma (Italy)	4–0	(Slovakia) Slovan Bratislava	Rome, Italy
21:00	Hermoso 21'; Molina 39'; Pisilli 52'; Malen 58' (pen.)	Report	Barseghyan (yellow card) 20'; Camara (yellow card) 65'; Martínez (yellow card) 75'	Stadium: Stadio Olimpico; Attendance: 64,399; Referee: Sandro Schärer (Switzerland)

Tue, 3 November 2026 4	LASK (Austria)	4–0	(Slovakia) Slovan Bratislava	Linz, Austria
21:00 CET	Jørgensen 19', 37'; Ljubičić 44'; Adeniran 48'	Report	Martínez (yellow card) 25'	Stadium: Raiffeisen Arena; Attendance: 17,246; Referee: Donatas Rumšas (Lithuania)

Tue, 24 November 2026 5	Slovan Bratislava (Slovakia)	–	(Spain) Real Betis	Bratislava, Slovakia
				Stadium: Tehelné pole

Wed, 9 December 2026 6	Slovan Bratislava (Slovakia)	–	(Ukraine) Shakhtar	Bratislava, Slovakia
				Stadium: Tehelné pole

Tue, 19 January 2027 7	Lille (France)	–	(Slovakia) Slovan Bratislava

Wed, 27 January 2027 8	Slovan Bratislava (Slovakia)	–	(Italy) Inter Milan	Bratislava, Slovakia
Slovan Bratislava (Slovakia)				Stadium: Tehelné pole

== Statistics ==
=== Attendances ===
As of 29 Sep 2026

	Matches	Attendances	Average	High	Low
Slovak First Football League	4	28,736	7,184	8,601	5,457
Slovak Cup	0				
Champions League	4	79,982	19,996	21,640	17,867
Total	8	108,718	13,590	21,350	5,457
