= Roman Čerepkai =

Slovak footballer (born 2002)

Personal information
- Full name: Roman Čerepkai
- Date of birth: 6 April 2002 (age 24)
- Place of birth: Bratislava, Slovakia
- Height: 1.90 m (6 ft 3 in)
- Position: Forward

Team information
- Current team: Slovan Bratislava
- Number: 13

Youth career
- 2009–2018: Slovan Bratislava
- 2019: Sampdoria
- 2019–2021: Slovan Bratislava

Senior career*
Years	Team	Apps	(Gls)
2021–2022	Slovan Bratislava B	23	(7)
2022	Slovan Bratislava	0	(0)
2022–2025	Teplice	31	(1)
2023	→ Zlaté Moravce (loan)	29	(5)
2025–2026	Košice	45	(16)
2026–	Slovan Bratislava	4	(0)

International career^{‡}
2018–2019	Slovakia U17	6	(2)
2026–	Slovakia	1	(0)
- * Club domestic league appearances and goals as of 10 October 2026 ‡ National team caps and goals as of 6 June 2026

Roman Čerepkai (born 6 April 2002) is a Slovak footballer who plays for Slovan Bratislava and the Slovakia national team.

== Club career ==
Roman Čerepkai developed as a footballer in ŠK Slovan Bratislava. In 2022 he transferred to the Czech outfit Teplice, where he remained until 2025. In 2023 he was loaned to the Slovak team FC ViOn Zlaté Moravce. In the winter of 2025, he transferred to FC Košice with a contract until 2027. In Košice, Čerepkai developed as one of the leading strikers in Slovakia, leading to his call-up for the national team. In September 2026, Čerepkai transferred back to his home club Šk Slovan Bratislava with a 4-year contract. According to the Slovak media, Košice received about 500,000 euro for Čerepkai.

== International career ==
Čerepkai made his senior debut for Slovakia in June 2026, playing 14 minutes in a friendly against Montenegro.

== Career statistics ==
=== Club ===
As of match played 14 October 2026

Appearances and goals by club, season and competition
Club	Season	League			National cup		Europe		Other		Total	
Club	Season	Division	Apps	Goals	Apps	Goals	Apps	Goals	Apps	Goals	Apps	Goals
Slovan Bratislava B	2020–21	2. Liga	7	2	—		—		—		7	2
Slovan Bratislava B	2021–22	2. Liga	16	5	—		—		—		16	5
Slovan Bratislava B	Total		23	7	—		—		—		23	7
Slovan Bratislava	2022–23	Slovak First Football League	0	0	0	0	0	0	—		0	0
Teplice	2022–23	Czech First League	4	0	0	0	—		—		4	0
Teplice	2023–24	Czech First League	14	0	—		—		—		14	0
Teplice	2024–25	Czech First League	13	1	1	0	—		—		14	1
Teplice	Total		31	1	1	0	—		—		32	1
Zlaté Moravce (loan)	2022–23	Slovak First Football League	11	3	—		—		—		11	3
Zlaté Moravce (loan)	2023–24	Slovak First Football League	18	2	2	1	—		—		20	3
Zlaté Moravce (loan)	Total		29	5	2	1	—		—		31	6
Košice	2024–25	Slovak First Football League	13	4	1	0	—		—		14	4
Košice	2025–26	Slovak First Football League	30	10	6	2	2 (Note: Appearances in UEFA Conference League)	1	—		38	13
Košice	Total		43	14	7	2	2	1	—		52	17
Slovan Bratislava	2026–27	Slovak First Football League	4	0	2	0	2 (Note: Appearances in UEFA Champions League)	1	—		8	1
Career total			130	27	12	3	4	2	0	0	146	32

=== International ===
As of match played 5 June 2026

Appearances and goals by national team and year
National team	Year	Apps	Goals
Slovakia	2026	1	0
Total		1	0
