= 2024–25 FK Teplice season =

FK Teplice
2024–25 season
- Stadium: Na Stínadlech
- Czech First League: Pre-season
- Czech Cup: Pre-season
- Average home league attendance: 4,078

The 2024–25 season is the 80th season in the history of FK Teplice, and the club's 29th consecutive season in Czech First League. In addition to the domestic league, the team participated in the 2024–25 edition of the Czech Cup.

== Transfers ==
=== Out ===
Pos.	Player	Transferred to	Fee	Date	Source
GK	(Czech Republic) Tomáš Grigar		End of contract	1 July 2024	

== Friendlies ==
=== Pre-season ===
22 June 2024 Friendly	Teplice (Czech Republic)	1–0	(Czech Republic) Žižkov	Dubí
10:30	Radosta 40'			Stadium: Hřiště SK Dubí

29 June 2024 Friendly	Hradec Králové (Czech Republic)	v	(Czech Republic) Teplice
11:00

29 June 2024 Friendly	Vlašim (Czech Republic)	0–2	(Czech Republic) Teplice	Vlašim
11:00			Horský 31'; Radosta 42'	Stadium: Stadion Kollárova ulice

6 July 2024 Friendly	Teplice (Czech Republic)	v	(Germany) Chemnitzer FC
11:00

10 July 2024 Friendly	Warta Poznań (Poland)	1–4	(Czech Republic) Teplice	Opalenica, Poland
17:30				Stadium: Hotel Remes Sport & Spa

13 July 2024 Friendly	Lech Poznań (Poland)	0–2	(Czech Republic) Teplice	Poznań, Poland
16:00			Horský 73'; Čerepkai 82'	Stadium: boczne boisko Enea Stadionu

== Competitions ==
=== Overall record ===
Competition	First match	Last match	Starting round	Final position	Record							
Competition	First match	Last match	Starting round	Final position	Pld	W	D	L	GF	GA	GD	Win %
Czech First League regular season	20 July 2024	19 April 2025	Matchday 1	14th	0	0	0	0	0	0	+0	—
Czech First League relegation round	27 April 2024	25 May 2025	Matchday 1		0	0	0	0	0	0	+0	—
Czech Cup					0	0	0	0	0	0	+0	—
Total					0	0	0	0	0	0	+0	—

Source: Soccerway

=== Czech First League ===
==== Regular season ====
Pos	Team	Pld	W	D	L	GF	GA	GD	Pts	Qualification or relegation
10	Bohemians 1905	30	8	10	12	32	42	−10	34 (Note: Head to head points: Bohemians 1905 8, Mladá Boleslav 7, Teplice 1.)	Qualification for the middle group
11	Mladá Boleslav	30	9	7	14	40	40	0	34	Qualification for the relegation group
12	Teplice	30	9	7	14	32	42	−10	34	Qualification for the relegation group
13	Slovácko	30	7	9	14	25	51	−26	30	Qualification for the relegation group
14	Dukla Prague	30	5	9	16	23	47	−24	24	Qualification for the relegation group

Source: Chance Liga
Rules for classification: 1) Points; 2) Head-to-head points; 3) Head-to-head goal difference; 4) Head-to-head goals scored; 5) Goal difference; 6) Goals scored; 7) Fair-play ranking; 8) Draw.

==== Results summary ====
Overall								Home						Away					
Pld	W	D	L	GF	GA	GD	Pts	W	D	L	GF	GA	GD	W	D	L	GF	GA	GD
0	0	0	0	0	0	0	0	0	0	0	0	0	0	0	0	0	0	0	0

Source: Chance Liga

==== Results by round ====
Round	1
Ground	A
Result	
Position	

Source: Chance Liga
A = Away; H = Home; W = Win; D = Draw; L = Loss

==== Matches ====
The match schedule was released on 20 June 2024.

==== Relegation round ====
Pos	Team	Pld	W	D	L	GF	GA	GD	Pts	Qualification or relegation
11	Teplice	35	12	8	15	41	45	−4	44	
12	Mladá Boleslav	35	11	8	16	48	48	0	41	
13	Slovácko	35	9	11	15	31	56	−25	38	
14	Dukla Prague (O)	35	8	10	17	34	55	−21	34	Qualification for the relegation play-offs
15	Pardubice (O)	35	6	7	22	25	56	−31	25	Qualification for the relegation play-offs
16	České Budějovice (R)	35	0	6	29	16	86	−70	6	Relegation to FNL

Source: Chance Liga
Rules for classification: 1) Total points; 2) Points earned in regular season; 3) Head-to-head points (regular season); 4) Head-to-head goal difference (regular season); 5) Head-to-head goals scored (regular season); 5) Goal difference (all matches); 6) Goals scored (all matches); 7) Fair-play ranking; 8) Draw.
(O) Play-off winners; (R) Relegated
