= Daiki Matsuoka =

Japanese footballer (born 2001)

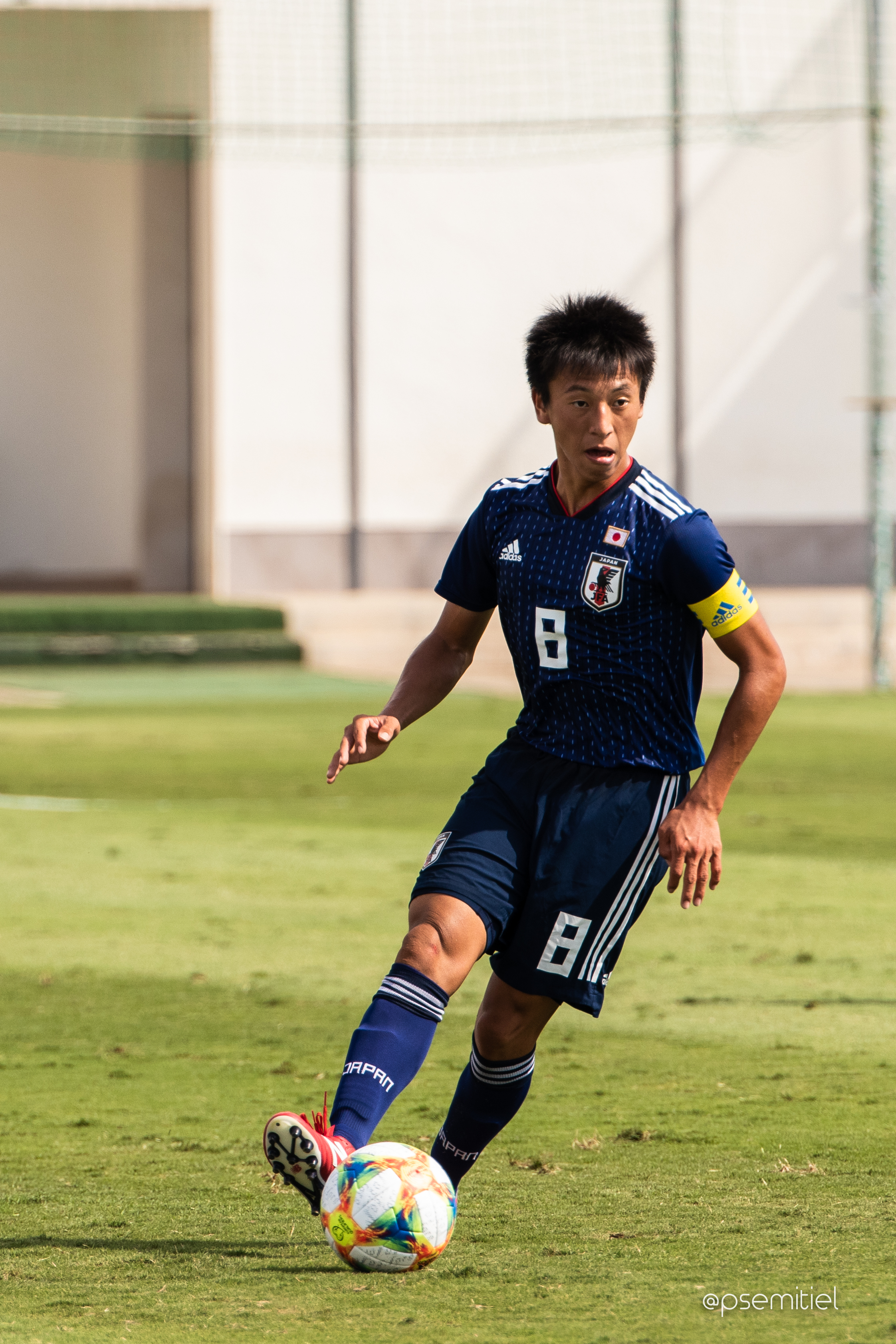

Personal information
- Date of birth: 1 June 2001 (age 25)
- Place of birth: Kumamoto, Japan
- Height: 1.70 m (5 ft 7 in)
- Position: Defensive midfielder

Team information
- Current team: ŠK Slovan Bratislava
- Number: 41

Youth career
- –2016: Sorriso Kumamoto
- 2017–2019: Sagan Tosu

Senior career*
Years	Team	Apps	(Gls)
2019–2021	Sagan Tosu	76	(0)
2021–2023	Shimizu S-Pulse	35	(0)
2023	→ Novorizontino (loan)	0	(0)
2024–	Avispa Fukuoka	72	(3)
2026–	→ Slovan Bratislava (loan)	20	(2)

International career^{‡}
2018–2019	Japan U18	6	(0)
2019	Japan U19	1	(0)
2019	Japan U23	9	(0)
2019	Japan U22	2	(0)
2022	Japan U21	1	(0)
2023	Japan Olympics	5	(0)
Medal record
Men's football
Representing Japan
Asian Games
Silver medal – second place	2022 Hangzhou	Team
- * Club domestic league appearances and goals as of 31 October 2026 ‡ National team caps and goals as of 23:11, 7 October 2023 (UTC)

Daiki Matsuoka (松岡 大起, Matsuoka Daiki; born 1 June 2001) is a Japanese footballer currently playing as a defensive midfielder for ŠK Slovan Bratislava in the Niké liga.

== Career ==
On 2 August 2021, Matsuoka was announced at Shimizu S-Pulse.

== International career ==
Matsuoka was part of the Japan squad for the 2022 Asian Games.

== Career statistics ==
=== Club ===
As of match played 31 October 2026

Appearances and goals by club, season and competition
Club	Season	League			National Cup		League Cup		Other		Total	
Club	Season	Division	Apps	Goals	Apps	Goals	Apps	Goals	Apps	Goals	Apps	Goals
Sagan Tosu	2019	J1 League	23	0	3 (Note: Appearances in the Emperor's Cup)	0	4 (Note: Appearances in the J. League Cup)	0	0	0	30	0
Sagan Tosu	2020	J1 League	32	0	0	0	1	0	0	0	33	0
Sagan Tosu	2021	J1 League	21	0	2	0	2	0	0	0	25	0
Sagan Tosu	Total		76	0	5	0	7	0	0	0	103	0
Shimizu S-Pulse	2021	J1 League	15	0	0	0	0	0	0	0	15	0
Shimizu S-Pulse	2022	J1 League	20	0	0	0	3	0	0	0	23	0
Shimizu S-Pulse	Total		35	0	0	0	3	0	0	0	38	0
Novorizontino (loan)	2023	Série B	0	0	–		–		–		0	0
Avispa Fukuoka	2024	J1 League	36	2	2	2	1	0	–		39	4
Avispa Fukuoka	2025	J1 League	36	1	3	0	4	0	–		43	1
Avispa Fukuoka	Total		72	3	5	2	5	0	–		82	5
Slovan Bratislava (loan)	2025–26	Slovak First Football League	9	0	–		–		–		9	0
Slovan Bratislava (loan)	2026–27	Slovak First Football League	11	2	2	1	5 (Note: Appearances in UEFA Champions League)	0	–		18	3
Slovan Bratislava (loan)	Total		20	2	2	1	5	0	–		27	3
Career total			203	5	12	3	20	0	0	0	235	8
