= Artur Gajdoš =

Slovak footballer (born 2004)

Personal information
- Date of birth: 20 January 2004 (age 22)
- Place of birth: Ilava, Slovakia
- Height: 1.70 m (5 ft 7 in)
- Position: Midfielder

Team information
- Current team: Slovan Bratislava
- Number: 8

Youth career
- 2009–2010: Dubnica nad Váhom
- 2010–2020: AS Trenčín

Senior career*
Years	Team	Apps	(Gls)
2020–2024	AS Trenčín	77	(12)
2021	→ Dubnica nad Váhom (loan)	2	(0)
2024–	Slovan Bratislava	40	(2)
2025	→ AS Trenčín (loan)	17	(2)

International career^{‡}
2019	Slovakia U15	2	(0)
2019–2020	Slovakia U16	4	(2)
2021	Slovakia U18	2	(0)
2021–2023	Slovakia U19	17	(9)
2022	Slovakia U20	6	(1)
2023–	Slovakia U21	22	(6)
2026–	Slovakia	3	(0)
- * Club domestic league appearances and goals as of 31 October 2026 ‡ National team caps and goals as of 18 November 2026

Artur Gajdoš (born 20 January 2004) is a Slovak professional footballer who plays as a midfielder for ŠK Slovan Bratislava in the Niké Liga.

== Early life ==
Gajdoš was born on 20 January 2004 in Ilava. His father Jozef was a footballer who played for 2. Liga club FK Dubnica. At the age of nine, Gajdoš moved to the youth team of AS Trenčín, which offered better youth coaching and training facilities.

== Club career ==
=== AS Trenčín ===
Gajdoš made his Fortuna Liga debut for AS Trenčín against Ružomberok on 1 November 2020 at the age of 16 years and 286 days. At that time, he was among 20 youngest players to ever start in the Slovak top league. Later in the month, Gajdoš signed a three-year professional contract with the club as an alumnus of club's This is my sen Academy.

In January 2024, the daily Sme listed Gajdoš among top 5 young talents of Slovak football, alongside Šimon Faško, Nino Marcelli, Leo Sauer and Mário Sauer.

=== ŠK Slovan Bratislava ===
On 3 September 2024, Slovan Bratislava announced signing one of best Niké Liga young prospect Artur Gajdoš, he signed a four-year contract.

== International career ==
Gajdoš was a part of the Slovakia national under-20 football team, that advanced to the elimination stage at the 2023 FIFA U-20 World Cup in Argentina.

In November 2022, Gajdoš received his first call-up to the Slovak senior squad as a backup footballer for two friendly matches against Montenegro and Marek Hamšík's retirement game against Chile. The same year in December, he was listed in the national team's training camp at NTC Senec.

== Career statistics ==
=== Club ===
As of match played 31 October 2026

Appearances and goals by club, season and competition
Club	Season	League			Cup		Europe		Other		Total	
Club	Season	Division	Apps	Goals	Apps	Goals	Apps	Goals	Apps	Goals	Apps	Goals
AS Trenčín	2020–21	Slovak First Football League	8	0	0	0	—		—		8	0
AS Trenčín	2021–22	Slovak First Football League	6	0	3	0	—		—		9	0
AS Trenčín	2022–23	Slovak First Football League	29	6	5	1	—		—		34	7
AS Trenčín	2023–24	Slovak First Football League	29	5	1	2	—		—		30	7
AS Trenčín	2024–25	Slovak First Football League	5	1	—		—		—		5	1
AS Trenčín	Total		77	12	9	3	—		—		86	15
Dubnica nad Váhom (loan)	2021–22	2. Liga	2	0	—		—		—		2	0
Slovan Bratislava	2024–25	Slovak First Football League	11	0	2	0	3 (Note: Appearances in UEFA Champions League)	0	—		16	0
Slovan Bratislava	2025–26	Slovak First Football League	21	2	2	0	3 (Note: Appearances in UEFA Conference League)	0	—		26	2
Slovan Bratislava	2026–27	Slovak First Football League	8	0	2	0	6	0	—		16	0
Slovan Bratislava	Total		40	2	6	0	12	0	—		58	2
AS Trenčín (loan)	2024–25	Slovak First Football League	17	2	—		—		2 (Note: Appearances in relegation play-offs)	1	19	0
Career total			136	16	15	3	14	1	2	0	165	17

=== International ===
As of match played 16 November 2026

Appearances and goals by national team and year
National team	Year	Apps	Goals
Slovakia	2026	3	0
Total		3	0

== Honours ==
Individual

- Slovak Super Liga Young Player of the Season: 2022–23
