= Rahim Ibrahim =

Ghanaian footballer

Personal information
- Full name: Rash Rahim Ibrahim
- Date of birth: 10 June 2001 (age 25)
- Place of birth: Accra, Ghana
- Height: 1.85 m (6 ft 1 in)
- Position: Midfielder

Team information
- Current team: Slovan Bratislava
- Number: 5

Youth career
- Accra Lions

Senior career*
Years	Team	Apps	(Gls)
–2020	Accra Lions		
2020–2025	AS Trenčín	83	(9)
2025–	Slovan Bratislava	49	(9)

International career^{‡}
2026–	Ghana	1	(0)
- * Club domestic league appearances and goals as of 31 October 2026 ‡ National team caps and goals as of 12 November 2026

Rash Rahim Ibrahim (born 10 June 2001) is a Ghanaian professional footballer who plays as a midfielder for Niké Liga club Slovan Bratislava and the Ghana national team.

== Club career ==
=== AS Trenčín ===
Ibrahim joined AS Trenčín in on 28 December 2020. Ibrahim made his Fortuna Liga debut for AS Trenčín against ViOn Zlaté Moravce on 23 July 2021. He extended his contract with AS Trenčín on 16 February 2023.

=== Slovan Bratislava ===
Ibrahim joined Slovan Bratislava on 15 February 2025.

== Career statistics ==
As of match played 31 October 2026

Appearances and goals by club, season and competition
Club	Season	League			Cup		Europe		Total	
Club	Season	Division	Apps	Goals	Apps	Goals	Apps	Goals	Apps	Goals
AS Trenčín	2021–22	Slovak First Football League	23	0	5	0	—		28	0
AS Trenčín	2022–23	Slovak First Football League	18	1	2	2	—		20	3
AS Trenčín	2023–24	Slovak First Football League	28	6	1	0	—		29	6
AS Trenčín	2024–25	Slovak First Football League	14	2	1	2	—		15	4
AS Trenčín	Total		83	9	9	4	—		92	13
Slovan Bratislava	2024–25	Slovak First Football League	12	2	3	0	—		15	2
Slovan Bratislava	2025–26	Slovak First Football League	28	2	4	0	10 (Note: Three appearances in UEFA Champions League, two appearances in UEFA Europa League, five appearances and one goal in UEFA Conference League)	1	43	3
Slovan Bratislava	2026–27	Slovak First Football League	9	5	2	1	8 (Note: Appearances in UEFA Champions League)	0	19	6
Slovan Bratislava	Total		49	9	10	1	18	1	77	11
Career total			132	18	19	5	18	1	169	24
