= Kelvin Pires =

Cape Verdean footballer (born 2000)

Personal information
- Full name: Kelvin Spencer Pires
- Date of birth: 5 June 2000 (age 26)
- Place of birth: Boa Vista, Cape Verde
- Height: 1.93 m (6 ft 4 in)
- Position: Centre-back

Team information
- Current team: SJK
- Number: 4

Youth career
- Batuque

Senior career*
Years	Team	Apps	(Gls)
2019–2020	Batuque		
2020–2024	AS Trenčín	52	(4)
2024	→ SJK (loan)	26	(1)
2025–	SJK	34	(1)

International career^{‡}
2021–	Cape Verde	4	(1)
- * Club domestic league appearances and goals as of 13 November 2026 ‡ National team caps and goals as of 30 March 2026

Kelvin Spencer Pires (Portuguese: [ˈkɛl.vin ˈspɛ̃.sɛɾ ˈpi.ɾɨʃ]; born 5 June 2000), also known as Djack (Kabuverdianu: [ʤak]) is a Cape Verdean professional footballer who plays as a centre back for Veikkausliiga club SJK and the Cape Verde national team.

== Club career ==
Pires made his Fortuna Liga debut for AS Trenčín against FC Spartak Trnava on 6 March 2021.

On 6 February 2024, Pires was loaned out to Finnish Veikkausliiga club SJK Seinäjoki for the 2024 season.

On 14 November 2024, Pires signed a permanent contract with SJK, on a two-year deal with a two-year option, for an undisclosed fee.

== International career ==
Pires made his debut with the Cape Verde national team in a 2022 FIFA World Cup qualification home fixture with Nigeria on 4 September 2021. He was featured in the starting-XI and completed the entirety of the match. Cape Verde lost 1–2.

On 18 May 2026, he was called up by Cape Verde's head coach Bubista for the 2026 FIFA World Cup.

== Career statistics ==
=== Club ===
As of 2 November 2024.

Appearances and goals by club, season and competition
Club	Season	League			National cup (Note: Includes Slovak Cup and Suomen Cup)		League cup (Note: Includes Finnish League Cup)		Continental		Total	
Club	Season	Division	Apps	Goals	Apps	Goals	Apps	Goals	Apps	Goals	Apps	Goals
AS Trenčín	2020–21	Slovak Super Liga	2	0	0	0	–		–		2	0
AS Trenčín	2021–22	Slovak Super Liga	23	0	3	0	–		–		26	0
AS Trenčín	2022–23	Slovak Super Liga	27	4	6	2	–		–		33	6
AS Trenčín	2023–24	Slovak Super Liga	0	0	3	0	–		–		3	0
AS Trenčín	Total		52	4	12	2	–	–	–	–	64	6
SJK (loan)	2024	Veikkausliiga	26	1	4	2	2	0	–		32	3
SJK	2025	Veikkausliiga	0	0	0	0	2	0	0	0	2	0
Career total			78	5	16	4	4	0	0	0	98	9

=== International ===
As of match played 30 March 2026

Cape Verde
Year	Apps	Goals
2021	1	0
2022	1	0
2025	1	0
2026	1	1
Total	4	1

Scores and results list Cape Verde's goal tally first, score column indicates score after each Pires goal.

List of international goals scored by Kelvin Pires
No.	Date	Venue	Cap	Opponent	Score	Result	Competition
1	30 March 2026	Eden Park, Auckland, New Zealand	4	Finland	1–1	1–1 (4–2 p)	2026 FIFA Series
