= Marek Bartoš =

Slovak footballer

- Bartoš with Motor Lublin in 2026

Personal information
- Full name: Marek Kristián Bartoš
- Date of birth: 13 October 1996 (age 30)
- Place of birth: Spišská Nová Ves, Slovakia
- Height: 1.93 m (6 ft 4 in)
- Position: Centre-back

Team information
- Current team: Motor Lublin
- Number: 39

Youth career
- 2004–2014: Púchov

Senior career*
Years	Team	Apps	(Gls)
2015–2016	Púchov	33	(4)
2016–2017	Dunajská Lužná	42	(9)
2018	Pohronie	8	(0)
2018–2024	Železiarne Podbrezová	132	(12)
2019	→ Pohronie (loan)	12	(0)
2024–	Motor Lublin	49	(2)
- * Club domestic league appearances and goals as of 21:36, 29 May 2026 (UTC)

Marek Kristián Bartoš (born 13 October 1996) is a Slovak professional footballer who plays as a centre-back for Polish club Motor Lublin.

== Club career ==
=== Železiarne Podbrezová ===
Bartoš made his Fortuna Liga debut for Železiarne Podbrezová against DAC Dunajská Streda on 22 July 2018, during a home 1–2 defeat. He played the entirety of the game. Bartoš departed from Podbrezová after featuring in over 80 top division games for the club, scoring eight goals. Club's General Manager Miroslav Poliaček elaborated, that Bartoš had sought to advance in his career for multiple transfer windows.

=== Motor Lublin ===
On 28 June 2024, Bartoš joined Polish top-flight club Motor Lublin on a deal until the end of June 2026, with an extension option for a further year.

== Honours ==
Individual

- Slovak Super Liga Team of the Season: 2022–23
