= Adewale Oladoye =

Nigerian footballer

Personal information
- Date of birth: 25 August 2001 (age 25)
- Height: 1.80 m (5 ft 11 in)
- Position: Midfielder

Youth career
- –2021: Water FC
- 2021: Gent

Senior career*
| Years | Team | Apps | (Gls) |
| 2021–2022 | Gent | 4 | (0) |
| 2022–2023 | Trenčín | 11 | (0) |
| 2023 | RFS | 4 | (0) |
| 2024–2025 | Dinamo Brest | 31 | (2) |
- * Club domestic league appearances and goals as of 3 April 2026

Adewale Oladoye (born 25 August 2001) is a Nigerian footballer.

== Club career ==
He made his Belgian First Division A debut for Gent on 19 May 2021 in a game against Standard Liège. He scored his first goal for Gent on 5 August 2021 in a Conference League qualifier against RFS.

On 6 July 2022, Oladoye signed with Trenčín in Slovakia.
