= Marián Pišoja =

Slovak footballer

Personal information
- Full name: Marián Pišoja
- Date of birth: 16 June 2000 (age 26)
- Place of birth: Považská Bystrica, Slovakia
- Height: 1.84 m (6 ft 0 in)
- Position: Centre-back

Team information
- Current team: FC Zlín
- Number: 82

Youth career
- –2014: Púchov
- 2014–2017: AS Trenčín

Senior career*
Years	Team	Apps	(Gls)
2018–2021	AS Trenčín	2	(0)
2019–2021	→ Púchov (loan)	23	(1)
2021–2025	Dukla Banská Bystrica	106	(3)
2022–2024	Dolný Kubín	8	(0)
2025-	FC Zlín	28	(1)

International career^{‡}
2016–2017	Slovakia U17	6	(1)
2018	Slovakia U19	3	(0)
- * Club domestic league appearances and goals as of 27 May 2026 ‡ National team caps and goals as of 16 October 2018

Marián Pišoja (born 16 June 2000) is a Slovak footballer who plays for FC Zlín as a centre-back.

== Club career ==
Pišoja made his Fortuna Liga debut for AS Trenčín against FC ViOn Zlaté Moravce on 23 February 2019.
