= Róbert Polievka =

Slovak footballer

Personal information
- Date of birth: 9 June 1996 (age 30)
- Place of birth: Krupina, Slovakia
- Height: 1.82 m (6 ft 0 in)
- Position: Forward

Team information
- Current team: Dukla Banská Bystrica
- Number: 17

Youth career
- 2003–2004: OTJ Hontianske Nemce
- 2004–2006: MFK Strojár Krupina
- 2006–2014: Dukla Banská Bystrica

Senior career*
Years	Team	Apps	(Gls)
2014–2015	Dukla Banská Bystrica	24	(1)
2015–2017	DAC Dunajská Streda	44	(1)
2017	→ ŽP Šport Podbrezová (loan)	12	(1)
2017–2018	Žilina	9	(1)
2017–2018	Žilina B	13	(6)
2018–2024	Dukla Banská Bystrica	149	(79)
2024–2026	MTK Budapest	46	(7)
2026–	Dukla Banská Bystrica	6	(3)

International career^{‡}
2014–2015	Slovakia U19	5	(1)
2015–2017	Slovakia U21	5	(1)
2023–	Slovakia	10	(0)
- * Club domestic league appearances and goals as of 21 September 2026 ‡ National team caps and goals as of 21:31, 5 June 2024 (UTC)

Róbert Polievka (born 9 June 1996) is a Slovak footballer who plays as a forward for Dukla Banská Bystrica.

== Club career ==
Polievka made his professional debut for Banská Bystrica on 12 July 2014, coming on as a substitute in the 90” minute for Nicolas Šumský.

On 20 June 2015, he signed a three-year contract with Dunajská Streda. Polievka made his debut for the club in a 2:0 win over FK Senica, starting the match.

On 17 June 2024, it was announced that he would be joining Hungarian club MTK Budapest.

== International career ==
In March 2023, Polievka received his first call-up to the Slovak senior squad for two home UEFA Euro 2024 qualifiers against Luxembourg and Bosnia and Herzegovina. He debuted in a goalless draw against the former opponent on 23 March 2023, only to be replaced by Róbert Boženík after 72 minutes. Erik Farkaš of Aktuality.sk rated him 3 out of 10 on Polievka's debut, criticising lack of activity from the footballer as well as inadequate utilisation of his strengths.

== Honours ==
Individual

- Slovak Super Liga Player of the Month: August 2022, February 2023
- Slovak Super Liga Goal of the Month: February 2023
- Slovak Super Liga Team of the Season: 2022–23
