= Strahinja Kerkez =

Cypriot footballer (born 2002)

Personal information
- Full name: Strahinja Kerkez
- Date of birth: 13 December 2002 (age 23)
- Place of birth: Belgrade, FR Yugoslavia
- Height: 1.86 m (6 ft 1 in)
- Position: Defender

Team information
- Current team: FK Panevėžys
- Number: 20

Youth career
- –2020: AEL Limassol

Senior career*
Years	Team	Apps	(Gls)
2020–2021	AEL Limassol	12	(0)
2021–2022	Juniors OÖ	7	(0)
2022–2024	AS Trenčín	5	(0)
2024–2025	Septemvri Sofia	9	(0)
2025–	Panevėžys	30	(1)

International career^{‡}
2020	Cyprus U19	2	(0)
2021–	Cyprus U21	13	(0)
- * Club domestic league appearances and goals as of 13 July 2026 ‡ National team caps and goals as of 11:17, 13 June 2022 (UTC)

Strahinja Kerkez (Greek: Στραχίνια Κέρκεζ; born 13 December 2002) is a professional footballer currently playing as a defender. Born in Serbia, he is a youth international for Cyprus.

== Personal life ==
Srahinja is the son of former Bosnia and Herzegovina international footballer Dušan Kerkez, who currently manages Atromitos F.C..

== Career statistics ==
=== Club ===
As of 16 January 2022.

Club	Season	League			Cup		Continental		Other		Total	
Club	Season	Division	Apps	Goals	Apps	Goals	Apps	Goals	Apps	Goals	Apps	Goals
AEL Limassol	2019–20	Cypriot First Division	0	0	1 (Note: Appearances in the Cypriot Cup)	0	–		0	0	1	0
AEL Limassol	2020–21	Cypriot First Division	12	0	2	0	–		0	0	14	0
AEL Limassol	Total		12	0	3	0	0	0	0	0	15	0
Juniors OÖ	2021–22	2. Liga	4	0	0	0	–		0	0	4	0
Career total			16	0	3	0	0	0	0	0	19	0
