= Chinonso Emeka =

Nigerian footballer

Personal information
- Full name: Chinoso Emeka
- Date of birth: 30 August 2001 (age 25)
- Place of birth: Warri, Nigeria
- Height: 1.97 m (6 ft 6 in)
- Position: Forward

Team information
- Current team: Dukla Prague
- Number: 11

Youth career
- –2021: Water FC
- 2021: Gent

Senior career*
Years	Team	Apps	(Gls)
2021–2022	Gent	1	(0)
2022–2025	AS Trenčín	45	(14)
2025–	Dukla Prague	1	(0)
- * Club domestic league appearances and goals as of 15 May 2026

Chinonso Emeka (born 30 August 2001) is a Nigerian footballer who plays for Czech First League club Dukla Prague.

== Club career ==
Emeka made his Belgian First Division A debut for Gent on 22 May 2021 in a game against Mechelen. On October 13, 2022, Emeka transferred to current club AS Trenčín in the Slovak First Football League.

On 8 August 2025, Emeka signed a contract with Czech First League club Dukla Prague.

== International career ==
He was included in the Nigeria squad for the 2019 FIFA U-20 World Cup, but did not appear in any games.
