= Samuel Lavrinčík =

Slovak footballer

Personal information
- Full name: Samuel Lavrinčík
- Date of birth: 10 July 2001 (age 25)
- Place of birth: Bratislava, Slovakia
- Height: 1.80 m (5 ft 11 in)
- Position: Midfielder

Team information
- Current team: Ružomberok (on loan from Jablonec)
- Number: 11

Youth career
- 2007–2015: FC Petržalka
- 2015: → Slovan Bratislava (loan)
- 2016–2019: Slovan Bratislava

Senior career*
Years	Team	Apps	(Gls)
2019–2020	Slovan Bratislava B	13	(1)
2021–2023	AS Trenčín	60	(2)
2023–2025	Ružomberok	61	(7)
2025–	Jablonec	9	(0)
2025–	Jablonec B	5	(1)
2026–	→ Ružomberok (loan)	7	(0)

International career^{‡}
2017	Slovakia U16	5	(0)
	Slovakia U17	5	(1)
	Slovakia U18	1	(0)
2019	Slovakia U19	4	(2)
2021–	Slovakia U21	4	(0)
- * Club domestic league appearances and goals as of 22 September 2026 ‡ National team caps and goals as of 14:54, 8 June 2022 (UTC)

Samuel Lavrinčík (born 10 July 2001) is a Slovak footballer who plays as a midfielder for Ružomberok, on loan from Czech club Jablonec.

== Club career ==
=== AS Trenčín ===
Lavrinčík made his Fortuna Liga debut for AS Trenčín against Slovan Bratislava on 14 March 2021.

=== MFK Ružomberok ===
On 21 July 2023, Lavrinčík moved to Niké liga side Ružomberok. He signed a contract for the next two seasons. He missed a penalty in the 2024–25 Slovak Cup.

=== FK Jablonec ===
Lavrinčík transferred to FK Jablonec in June 2025.

== International career ==
Lavrinčík was first recognised in Slovak senior national team nomination in November 2022 by Francesco Calzona being listed as an alternate for two friendly fixtures against Montenegro and Marek Hamšík's retirement game against Chile. Subsequently, in December 2022, he was nominated for the senior national team prospective players' training camp at NTC Senec.

== Honours ==
Individual

- Slovak Super Liga U-21 Team of the Season: 2021–22
