= Michal Kukučka =

Slovak footballer

Personal information
- Date of birth: 12 April 2002 (age 24)
- Place of birth: Nové Mesto nad Váhom, Slovakia
- Height: 1.91 m (6 ft 3 in)
- Position: Goalkeeper

Team information
- Current team: Jablonec (on loan from 1. FC Nürnberg)
- Number: 33

Youth career
- 2008–2013: AFC Nové Mesto nad Váhom
- 2013–2021: Trenčín

Senior career*
Years	Team	Apps	(Gls)
2021–2024	Trenčín	68	(0)
2024–	1. FC Nürnberg	1	(0)
2024–	1. FC Nürnberg II	7	(0)
2026	→ Koper (loan)	0	(0)
2026–	→ Jablonec (loan)	0	(0)

International career^{‡}
2019	Slovakia U18	1	(0)
2023–2024	Slovakia U21	2	(0)
- * Club domestic league appearances and goals as of 16 May 2026 ‡ National team caps and goals as of 28 March 2024

Michal Kukučka (born 12 April 2002) is a Slovak professional footballer who plays as a goalkeeper for Czech First League club Jablonec, on loan from 2. Bundesliga club 1. FC Nürnberg.

== Club career ==
=== Trenčín ===
Kukučka made his unexpected Fortuna Liga debut for Trenčín, during a home fixture at na Sihoti, against Spartak Trnava on 6 March 2021. He had to step-in to replace Igor Šemrinec, who had recently tested positive for COVID-19. He managed to keep a clean sheet. In this debut, he won himself a nomination in the official Fortuna Liga Team of the Week. In post-match interviews Kukučka highly praised experiences gained during a trial with Italian Serie A club Roma of autumn 2020. Kukučka also appeared in the first round of Fortuna Liga - Championship Group at Tehelné pole against Slovan Bratislava the following week, conceding six times during the 6–2 defeat.

=== 1. FC Nürnberg ===
On 14 June 2024, Kukučka signed with 1. FC Nürnberg in Germany. On 21 January 2026, he was loaned to Koper in Slovenia.

On 10 July 2026, Kukučka moved on a new loan to Jablonec in Czechia.
