= Filip Bainović =

Serbian footballer

Personal information
- Date of birth: 23 June 1996 (age 30)
- Place of birth: Požarevac, FR Yugoslavia
- Height: 1.79 m (5 ft 10 in)
- Position: Midfielder

Team information
- Current team: Panionios
- Number: 31

Youth career
- Rad

Senior career*
Years	Team	Apps	(Gls)
2015–2017	Rad	19	(1)
2015–2016	→ Žarkovo (loan)	37	(9)
2017–2018	Red Star Belgrade	0	(0)
2018	→ Rad (loan)	10	(0)
2018–2019	Rad	33	(1)
2019–2022	Górnik Zabrze	36	(0)
2021	→ Radnik Surdulica (loan)	16	(0)
2022–2023	AS Trenčín	45	(7)
2023–2024	Spartak Trnava	26	(4)
2024–2026	OFI	16	(1)
2026–	Panionios	3	(0)

International career
2014–2015	Serbia U19	4	(0)
2017	Serbia U20	4	(0)
- * Club domestic league appearances and goals as of 19 September 2026

Filip Bainović (Serbian Cyrillic: Филип Баиновић; born 23 June 1996) is a Serbian professional footballer who plays as a midfielder for Greek Super League 2 club Panionios.

== Club career ==
=== Rad ===
Born in Požarevac, Bainović passed youth academy of football club Rad. As a member of generation which win the Serbian youth league for the 2014–15 season, Bainović joined the first team in summer 2015. He made his Serbian SuperLiga debut on 1 August 2015 in 4–1 home victory over Radnik Surdulica, when he also made an assist for a goal. He signed his first three-year professional contract with Rad on 11 September 2015. During the season, Bainović capped in the UEFA Youth League.

Shortly after he became fully pro, Bainović moved on dual registration to the satellite club Žarkovo. Playing for reserves, Bainović collected 43 appearances with 9 goals at total, including 37 appearances with 9 goals in the Serbian League Belgrade and 3 matches in the Serbian Cup. He also noted 3 games in Belgrade cup against Stepojevac Vaga, Dorćol and Brodarac 1947 after which he won the competition. He captained Žarkovo in his second season with the team.

Returning to the first squad, Bainović scored his first goal for Rad in the Serbian SuperLiga in 1–1 draw to Javor Ivanjica on 4 March 2017 from direct free kick. In August 2017, Bainović renewed his contract with Rad until 2020. At the beginning of 2018, Bainović moved back to Rad as a loaned player until the end of the 2017–18 Serbian SuperLiga campaign.

=== Red Star Belgrade ===
On 23 August 2017, Bainović signed with Red Star Belgrade on a three-year deal. Bainović made his debut for new club, replacing Uroš Račić in 65th minute of the Serbian Cup match against Dinamo Vranje, played on 11 October 2017.

== International career ==
In November 2014, Bainović had been invited to the Serbia national under-19 football team by coach Ivan Tomić. Bainović appeared as a member of the team until 2015. In early 2017, Bainović was called into the Serbian under-20 level by coaches Ilija Petković and Milan Obradović.

== Style of play ==
As a right-footed player, Bainović mainly operates as a defensive midfielder, being capable of playing as a central midfielder with possibility to take box-to-box role. He can also play as a central defender in some occasions. Bainović is characterized by leadership and captaincy.

== Career statistics ==
As of 8 June 2018

Appearances and goals by club, season and competition
Club	Season	League			Cup		Continental		Other		Total	
Club	Season	Division	Apps	Goals	Apps	Goals	Apps	Goals	Apps	Goals	Apps	Goals
Žarkovo (loan)	2015–16	Serbian League Belgrade	22	4	—		—		3 (Note: Including Belgrade cup matches against Stepojevac Vaga, Dorćol and Brodarac 1947)	0	25	4
Žarkovo (loan)	2016–17	Serbian League Belgrade	15	5	3 (Note: Including preliminary round against Loznica, first round against Metalac Gornji Milanovac, and second round match against Partizan)	0	—		—		18	5
Žarkovo (loan)	Total		37	9	3	0	—		3	0	43	9
Rad	2015–16	Serbian SuperLiga	1	0	—		—		—		1	0
Rad	2016–17	Serbian SuperLiga	13	1	—		—		—		13	1
Rad	2017–18	Serbian SuperLiga	15 (Note: Bainović made five appearances for the club at the beginning of season, before rejoined the club as a loaned player in second-half)	0	—		—		—		15	0
Rad	Total		29	1	—		—		—		29	1
Red Star Belgrade	2017–18	Serbian SuperLiga	0	0	2	0	0	0	—		2	0
Career total			66	10	5	0	0	0	3	0	74	10

== Honours ==
OFI

- Greek Cup: 2025–26
