= 2025–26 FC Tatran Prešov season =

Tatran Prešov
2025–26 season
- Owner: City of Prešov
- President: Ľuboš Micheľ
- Manager: Jaroslav Hynek (until 1 September 2025); Vladimír Cifranič (from 3 September 2025 to 2 March 2026); Jozef Kostelník (from 3 March 2026 to 23 March 2026); Erik Havrila (from 24 March 2026)
- Stadium: Futbal Tatran Arena
- Slovak First Football League: 12th (relegated)
- Slovak Cup: Semi-finals
- Highest home attendance: 6,398 v Košice (14 February 2026, Slovak First Football League)
- Lowest home attendance: 2,766 v Tatran Liptovský Mikuláš (11 March 2026, Slovak Cup)
- Average home league attendance: 5,379
- Biggest win: 7–0 v Družstevník Breznica (Away, 8 October 2025, Slovak Cup)
- Biggest defeat: 0–4 v Žilina (Home, 1 November 2025, Slovak First Football League)
Home colours	Away colours	Third colours

The 2025–26 season was Football Club Tatran Prešov's first season in the Slovak First Football League after winning the second division in the previous season. In addition to the domestic league, Tatran Prešov participated in the Slovak Cup.

== Background ==
Two years after the opening of the club's new stadium, Tatran Prešov entered the 2025–26 season with the City of Prešov as its sole owner; in June 2025, Ľuboš Micheľ returned as club president, while Jaroslav Hynek remained in charge of the first team as manager.

== Managerial changes ==
On 1 September 2025, Tatran Prešov and manager Jaroslav Hynek agreed to terminate his contract by mutual consent after six league matches.

On 3 September, Vladimír Cifranič was appointed as the club's new manager, replacing Hynek after serving as assistant manager at Podbrezová.

On 2 March 2026, Tatran Prešov dismissed Vladimír Cifranič following a run of poor results in the spring part of the season.

On 3 March, Jozef Kostelník was appointed as Cifranič's successor, with sporting director Stanislav Šesták stepping down after the appointment due to a previous dispute between the two.

On 23 March, Tatran Prešov announced the departure of Jozef Kostelník after a brief spell in charge.

On 24 March, Erik Havrila was appointed manager of Tatran Prešov, having previously served as assistant coach under Marek Petruš, Jaroslav Hynek, Vladimír Cifranič and Jozef Kostelník, and became the youngest manager in the league at the time of his appointment.

== Squad ==
Squad at end of season

Note: Flags indicate national team as defined under FIFA eligibility rules; some limited exceptions apply. Players may hold more than one non-FIFA nationality.

No.	Pos.	Nation	Player
1	GK	SVK	Adrián Knurovský
2	DF	MDA	Ioan-Călin Revenco
3	DF	SVK	Michal Sipľak
4	DF	SVK	Patrik Šimko (captain)
5	MF	SVK	Roman Begala
7	MF	CZE	Filip Souček
9	FW	SVK	Martin Regáli
10	FW	POL	Łukasz Wolsztyński
11	FW	SVK	Stanislav Olejník
14	MF	CAF	Séverin Tatolna (on loan from Podbrezová)
17	DF	UKR	Denys Taraduda (on loan from Spartak Trnava)
17	DF	SVK	Marek Terpak
20	MF	UKR	Artur Ukhan
22	DF	LAT	Daniels Balodis

No.	Pos.	Nation	Player
28	DF	SVK	Juraj Kotula
29	MF	HAI	Dominique Simon (on loan from (Czech Republic) Pardubice)
31	DF	SVK	Jozef Menich
33	DF	GER	Moritz Römling
39	FW	ENG	Shayon Harrison
44	MF	SVK	Jakub Molnár
55	DF	UKR	Taras Bondarenko
70	MF	POR	Hélder Morim
77	FW	SVK	Peter Juritka (on loan from Podbrezová)
80	FW	SEN	Landing Sagna
91	GK	SVK	Pavol Bajza
97	FW	SVK	Andy Masaryk
99	GK	UKR	Maksym Kuchynskyi

== Transfers ==
=== Summer ===
In: Note: Flags indicate national team as defined under FIFA eligibility rules; some limited exceptions apply. Players may hold more than one non-FIFA nationality.

No.	Pos.	Nation	Player
—	GK	SVK	Pavol Bajza (from FK Železiarne Podbrezová)
—	MF	SVK	Roman Begala (from FC Petržalka)
―	DF	SVK	Michal Sipľak (from (Poland) Puszcza Niepołomice)
―	DF	MDA	Ioan-Călin Revenco (from (Poland) Puszcza Niepołomice)
―	FW	POL	Łukasz Wolsztyński (from (Poland) Stal Mielec)
―	FW	SVK	Peter Juritka (on loan from Podbrezová)
―	DF	CZE	Václav Míka (on loan from (Czech Republic) Viktoria Plzeň)
―	MF	CZE	Filip Souček (from (Czech Republic) Sparta Prague)
―	MF	POR	Hélder Morim (from (Portugal) G.D. Chaves)
―	MF	UKR	Kyrylo Siheyev (on loan from (Ukraine) Shakhtar Donetsk)
―	DF	LAT	Daniels Balodis (from (Scotland) St Johnstone F.C.)
―	FW	LAT	Gļebs Patika (from (Cyprus) Pafos FC U19)
―	MF	FRA	Dominique Simon (on loan from (Czech Republic) FK Pardubice)

Out: Note: Flags indicate national team as defined under FIFA eligibility rules; some limited exceptions apply. Players may hold more than one non-FIFA nationality.

No.	Pos.	Nation	Player
—	GK	SVK	Alex Fojtíček (Released)
—	DF	ARM	Abov Avetisyan (Released)
—	MF	NGR	David Fadairo (Released)
—	MF	SVK	Adam Horvát (Released)
—	MF	SWE	Hugo Ahl (Released and joined MFK Zemplín Michalovce)
—	DF	POL	Dariusz Pawłowski (loan return to (Poland) Radomiak Radom)
—	DF	BRA	Willian Correia (Released)
—	MF	ESP	Oscar Castellano Matallana (Released)
—	FW	SVK	Matej Franko (Released)
—	DF	SVK	Richard Nagy (Released)
—	FW	SVK	Samuel Gladiš (Released)
—	MF	SVK	Lukáš Jendrek (Released)
—	MF	SVK	Denis Potoma (Released)

=== Winter ===
In: Note: Flags indicate national team as defined under FIFA eligibility rules; some limited exceptions apply. Players may hold more than one non-FIFA nationality.

No.	Pos.	Nation	Player
—	DF	CAF	Séverin Tatolna (on loan from FK Železiarne Podbrezová)
—	DF	UKR	Denys Taraduda (on loan from FC Spartak Trnava)
—	FW	ENG	Shayon Harrison (from Free Agent)
TBA	MF	SVK	Ján Bernát (from Free Agent)
17	DF	CZE	Jurij Medveděv (on loan from Slovan Bratislava)
TBA	FW	BRA	Gabriel Barbosa (on loan from (Poland) Górnik Zabrze)

Out: Note: Flags indicate national team as defined under FIFA eligibility rules; some limited exceptions apply. Players may hold more than one non-FIFA nationality.

No.	Pos.	Nation	Player
23	FW	KOS	Bleron Krasniqi (to (Austria) Kapfenberger SV)

== Competitions ==
=== Overview ===
Competition	First match	Last match	Starting round	Final position	Record							
Competition	First match	Last match	Starting round	Final position	Pld	W	D	L	GF	GA	GD	Win %
Slovak First Football League	26 July 2025	16 May 2026	Matchday 1	12th	32	6	12	14	29	43	−14	18.75
Slovak Cup	27 August 2025	15 April 2026	Second round	Semi-finals	7	5	1	1	24	7	+17	71.43
Total					39	11	13	15	53	50	+3	28.21

Source: Competitions

=== Slovak First Football League ===
==== Regular season ====
===== League table =====
Pos	Team	Pld	W	D	L	GF	GA	GD	Pts	Qualification
7	Ružomberok	22	6	7	9	24	34	−10	25	Qualification for the relegation group
8	Trenčín	22	7	3	12	18	37	−19	24 (Note: Ranked by head-to-head points: Trenčín 6, Košice 0.)	Qualification for the relegation group
9	Košice	22	7	3	12	35	42	−7	24	Qualification for the relegation group
10	Komárno	22	5	7	10	24	34	−10	22	Qualification for the relegation group
11	Tatran Prešov	22	4	9	9	22	35	−13	21	Qualification for the relegation group
12	Skalica	22	3	7	12	20	35	−15	16	Qualification for the relegation group

Source: Niké liga (in Slovak)
Rules for classification: 1) Points; 2) Head-to-head points; 3) Head-to-head goal difference; 4) Head-to-head away goals scored; 5) Play-off.

===== Results summary =====
Overall								Home						Away					
Pld	W	D	L	GF	GA	GD	Pts	W	D	L	GF	GA	GD	W	D	L	GF	GA	GD
22	4	9	9	22	35	−13	21	2	4	5	14	23	−9	2	5	4	8	12	−4

Source: Niké liga

===== Results by round =====
Round	1	2	3	4	5	6	7	8	9	10	11	12	13	14	15	16	17	18	19	20	21	22
Ground	H	A	A	H	A	H	A	H	A	A	H	A	H	H	A	H	A	H	A	H	H	A
Result	D	L	L	D	D	L	W	L	D	D	D	W	L	W	D	W	D	L	L	L	D	L
Position	5	9	9	9	9	9	8	10	10	10	11	9	11	8	8	7	7	8	8	11	10	11
Points	1	1	1	2	3	3	6	6	7	8	9	12	12	15	16	19	20	20	20	20	21	21

Source: Niké liga
A = Away; H = Home; W = Win; D = Draw; L = Loss

===== Matches =====
26 July 2025 1	Tatran Prešov	2–2	Slovan Bratislava	Prešov
20:30 CEST (UTC+2)	Regáli 33'; Olejník 52'; Míka (yellow card) 90+5'	Report	Kukharevych 31'; Ofori 39'; Weiss (yellow card) 79'; Mustafić (yellow card) 90+5'	Stadium: Futbal Tatran Arena; Attendance: 6,320; Referee: Peter Kráľovič; Assistant referees: Milan Štrbo, Tomáš Vorel

3 August 2025 2	Žilina	1–0	Tatran Prešov	Žilina
19:00 CEST (UTC+2)	Kaša 45'; Ďatko (yellow card) 67'; Sanusi (yellow card) 90'; Káčer (yellow card) 90'	Report	Potoma (yellow card) 5'; Regáli (yellow card) 21'; Sipľak (yellow card) 31'; Siheyev (yellow card) 46'; Morim (yellow card) 80'	Stadium: Štadión pod Dubňom; Attendance: 1,864; Referee: Martin Dohál; Assistant referees: Jakub Košecký, Ákos Juhos

10 August 2025 3	Spartak Trnava	1–0	Tatran Prešov	Trnava
19:00 CEST (UTC+2)	Kratochvíl 15'	Report	Begala (yellow card) 2'; Olejník (yellow card) 70'	Stadium: Anton Malatinský Stadium; Attendance: 5,078; Referee: Michal Smolák; Assistant referees: Tomáš Vorel, Matej Zemko

16 August 2025 4	Tatran Prešov	0–0	DAC Dunajská Streda	Prešov
20:30 CEST (UTC+2)	Souček (yellow card) 54'; Regáli (yellow card) 79'; Balodis (yellow card) 82'; Šimko (yellow card) 87'	Report	Kacharaba (yellow card) 59'; Đukanović (yellow card) 63'; Alex Méndez (yellow card) 85'; Udvaros (yellow card) 90'	Stadium: Futbal Tatran Arena; Attendance: 6,254; Referee: Martin Dohál; Assistant referees: František Ferenc, Rastislav Kuba

23 August 2025 5	Skalica	2–2	Tatran Prešov	Skalica
18:00 CEST (UTC+2)	Simon 23' (o.g.); Černek (yellow card) 33'; Fábry 65'; Šimko (yellow card) 90'	Report	Míka (yellow card) 47'; Sipľak (yellow card) 61'; Šimko (yellow card) 67'; Sagna 72', 77'	Stadium: Mestský štadión Skalica; Attendance: 737; Referee: Igor Valent; Assistant referees: Adam Jekkel, Andrej Hrmo

30 August 2025 6	Tatran Prešov	2–3	Trenčín	Prešov
18:00 CEST (UTC+2)	Simon 24'; Gáll (yellow card) 73'; Morim 81'; Sipľak (yellow card) 90'; Menich (red card) 90'	Report	Sani 32', 78', (yellow card) 66'; Pavek 41'; Yakubu (yellow card) 61'; Khan (yellow card) 79'; Kam (yellow card) 82'; Goss (yellow card) 90'; Hájovský (yellow card) 90'	Stadium: Futbal Tatran Arena; Attendance: 6,380; Referee: Filip Glova; Assistant referees: Simeon Vass, Peter Čajka

14 September 2025 7	Zemplín Michalovce	1–2	Tatran Prešov	Michalovce
17:00 CEST (UTC+2)	Zubairu (yellow card) 15'; Park (yellow card) 25'; Pauschek (yellow card) 31'; Čurma (yellow card) 40'; Ramos 66'; Dzotsenidze (yellow card) 90'	Report	Souček 10'; Regáli 19' (pen.), (yellow card) 20'; Šimko (yellow card) 28'; Sagna (yellow card) 81'; Masaryk (yellow card) 89'; Bajza (yellow card) 90'	Stadium: Mestský futbalový štadión Attendance: 2,896; Referee: Bálint Kišš; Assistant referees: Dušan Štofik, Patrik Kmec

20 September 2025 8	Tatran Prešov	1–3	Ružomberok	Prešov
18:00 CEST (UTC+2)	Regáli (yellow card) 53', (goal) 79'; Šimko (red card) 58'	Report	Bačík 1'; Král 11'; Köstl (yellow card) 29'; Hladík (yellow card) 58', (goal) 61'	Stadium: Futbal Tatran Arena; Attendance: 6,369; Referee: Erik Gemzický; Assistant referees: František Ferenc, Rastislav Kuba

27 September 2025 9	Košice	2–2	Tatran Prešov	Košice
20:30 CEST (UTC+2)	Čerepkai (yellow card) 4', (goal) 53'; Zsigmund (yellow card) 30'; Teplan (yellow card) 44'; Jakúbek 57'; Kakay (yellow card) 62'; Krivák (yellow card) 76'	Report	Begala (yellow card) 30', (goal) 45'; Regáli (yellow card) 60'; Kotula 78'	Stadium: Košická futbalová aréna Attendance: 8,111; Referee: Michal Očenáš; Assistant referees: Adam Jekkel, Tobiáš Pacák

4 October 2025 10	Komárno	0–0	Tatran Prešov	Zlaté Moravce
18:00 CEST (UTC+2)	Ivanics (yellow card) 90'	Report	Morim (yellow card) 57'	Stadium: ViOn Aréna; Attendance: 375; Referee: Michal Smolák; Assistant referees: Milan Štrbo, Juraj Halíček

18 October 2025 11	Tatran Prešov	2–2	Podbrezová	Prešov
15:30 CEST (UTC+2)	Olejník 27'; Šimko (yellow card) 59'; Sipľak (yellow card) 67'; Morim (yellow card) 88'; Regáli 90+5'	Report	Galčík (yellow card) 49', (goal) 70'; Šiler 59' (pen.); Luka (yellow card) 65'; Deml (yellow card) 73'; Jurička (yellow card) 80'; Palumets (yellow card) 81'; Štefánik (yellow card) 88'	Stadium: Futbal Tatran Arena; Attendance: 6,098; Referee: Martin Dohál; Assistant referees: Adam Jekkel, Martin Vitko

26 October 2025 12	Slovan Bratislava	0–1	Tatran Prešov	Bratislava
18:00 CEST (UTC+2)	Ihnatenko (yellow card) 27'; Mustafić (yellow card) 34'; Weiss (yellow card) 35'; Wimmer (yellow card) 36'; Pokorný (red card) 45'; Ibrahim (yellow card) 51'	Report	Menich (yellow card) 41'; Begala 86'	Stadium: Tehelné pole Attendance: 6,498; Referee: Filip Glova; Assistant referees: Daniel Poláček, Rastislav Kuba

1 November 2025 13	Tatran Prešov	0–4	Žilina	Prešov
15:30 CET (UTC+1)	Sipľak (yellow card) 39'; Olejník (yellow card) 68'; Gáll (yellow card) 90'	Report	Roginić (yellow card) 37', (goal) 73'; Adang 43'; Kaša (yellow card) 69'; Faško 70' (pen.); Kóša 88'	Stadium: Futbal Tatran Arena; Attendance: 6,160; Referee: Michal Smolák; Assistant referees: Peter Bednár, Mário Roszbeck

9 November 2025 14	Tatran Prešov	2–1	Spartak Trnava	Prešov
18:00 CET (UTC+1)	Olejník 41'; Jureškin 45' (o.g.); Begala (yellow card) 47'; Šimko (yellow card) 85'; Balodis (yellow card) 90'; Bajza (yellow card) 90'	Report	Taiwo (yellow card) 15'; Kudlička 26'; Mikovič (yellow card) 90'; Kratochvíl (yellow card) 90'; Ďuriš (yellow card) 90'; Moistsrapishvili (red card) 90'	Stadium: Futbal Tatran Arena; Attendance: 6,327; Referee: Ivan Kružliak; Assistant referees: Ján Pozor, Rastislav Kuba

23 November 2025 15	DAC Dunajská Streda	0–0	Tatran Prešov	Dunajská Streda
18:00 CET (UTC+1)	Redzic (red card) 90+2'	Report	Simon (yellow card) 34'; Morim (yellow card) 90+4'	Stadium: MOL Aréna; Attendance: 3,549; Referee: Matej Choreň; Assistant referees: Dušan Štofik, Mário Roszbeck

29 November 2025 16	Tatran Prešov	3–2	Skalica	Prešov
15:30 CET (UTC+1)	Regáli 6', 27', (yellow card) 22' (yellow-red card) 63'; Kotula (yellow card) 18'; Masaryk 53'	Report	Pudhorocký (yellow card) 22', (goal) 85'; Smejkal 38'	Stadium: Futbal Tatran Arena; Attendance: 5,356; Referee: Boris Marhefka; Assistant referees: Andrej Hrmo, Peter Čajka

7 December 2025 17	Trenčín	0–0	Tatran Prešov	Trenčín
15:30 CET (UTC+1)	Bagín (yellow card) 84'	Report	Olejník (yellow card) 19'; Šimko (yellow card) 65'; Bondarenko (yellow card) 89'	Stadium: Štadión Sihoť; Attendance: 967; Referee: Peter Kráľovič; Assistant referees: Ján Pozor, Daniel Poláček

13 December 2025 18	Tatran Prešov	0–1	Zemplín Michalovce	Prešov
18:00 CET (UTC+1)	Šimko (yellow card) 31'; Sagna (yellow card) 62'	Report	López (yellow card) 27'; Ahl 81'; Ramos (yellow card) 89'; Dzotsenidze (yellow card) 90'	Stadium: Futbal Tatran Arena; Attendance: 6,007; Referee: Michal Očenáš; Assistant referees: Juraj Halíček, Pavel Jánošík

7 February 2026 19	Ružomberok	1–0	Tatran Prešov	Ružomberok
15:30 CET (UTC+1)	Fila 8'; Bačík (yellow card) 26'; Marek (yellow card) 82'; Selecký (yellow card) 90'	Report	Begala (yellow card) 64'; Ukhan (yellow card) 77'; Sipľak (yellow card) 87'; Tatolna (yellow card) 89'	Stadium: Štadión pod Čebraťom; Attendance: 1,158; Referee: Marián Ruc; Assistant referees: Mário Roszbeck, Ákos Juhos

14 February 2026 20	Tatran Prešov	1–4	Košice	Prešov
18:00 CET (UTC+1)	Römling (red card) 9'; Masaryk 42'	Report	Čerepkai 11', 38'; Gallovič 35', (yellow card) 72'; Jakúbek 51'; Kóša (yellow card) 52'; Lichý (yellow card) 74'	Stadium: Futbal Tatran Arena; Attendance: 6,398; Referee: Boris Marhefka; Assistant referees: Peter Bednár, Tomáš Vorel

21 February 2026 21	Tatran Prešov	1–1	Komárno	Prešov
15:30 CET (UTC+1)	Regáli 73'	Report	Ganbayar 11', (yellow card) 53'; Špiriak (yellow card) 68' (yellow-red card) 87'	Stadium: Futbal Tatran Arena; Attendance: 3,669; Referee: Peter Kráľovič; Assistant referees: Milan Štrbo, Matej Hrebeňár

28 February 2026 22	Podbrezová	4–1	Tatran Prešov	Podbrezová
15:30 CET (UTC+1)	Silagadze 6' (pen.); Kujabi (yellow card) 19'; Kováčik 36'; Galčík 42' (pen.), (yellow card) 45'; Havrylenko (yellow card) 86'; Palumets 90'	Report	Bondarenko (yellow card) 41'; Olejník (yellow card) 45'; Regáli (yellow card) 59'; Sipľak 82' (pen.)	Stadium: ZELPO Aréna; Attendance: 1,467; Referee: Matej Choreň; Assistant referees: Peter Bednár, Matej Zemko

==== Relegation group ====
===== League table =====
Pos	Team	Pld	W	D	L	GF	GA	GD	Pts	Qualification or relegation	KOŠ	TRE	SKA	RUŽ	KOM	TAT
7	Košice	32	13	4	15	51	55	−4	43		—	2–0	2–0	3–1	2–1	2–1
8	Trenčín	32	13	3	16	34	51	−17	42		3–0	—	2–1	3–1	1–2	1–0
9	Skalica	32	9	8	15	34	45	−11	35		3–1	4–1	—	1–0	2–1	1–0
10	Ružomberok	32	8	11	13	34	50	−16	35		1–1	4–3	0–0	—	2–1	1–1
11	Komárno (O)	32	8	8	16	34	46	−12	32	Qualification for the relegation play-offs	1–2	0–1	0–2	3–0	—	1–0
12	Tatran Prešov (R)	32	6	12	14	29	43	−14	30	Relegation to the 2. Liga	2–1	0–1	3–0	0–0	0–0	—

Source: Niké liga (in Slovak)
Legend: Blue = home team win; Yellow = draw; Red = away team win.
Rules for classification: 1) Points; 2) Points in regular season; 3) Head-to-head points in regular season; 4) Head-to-head goal difference in regular season; 5) Head-to-head goals scored in regular season; 6) Head-to-head away goals scored in regular season (if two teams tied); 7) Goal difference; 8) Goals scored; 9) Fair play ranking; 10) Drawing of lots.
(O) Play-off winners; (R) Relegated

===== Results summary =====
Overall								Home						Away					
Pld	W	D	L	GF	GA	GD	Pts	W	D	L	GF	GA	GD	W	D	L	GF	GA	GD
10	2	3	5	7	8	−1	9	2	2	1	5	2	+3	0	1	4	2	6	−4

Source: Worldfootball

===== Results by round =====
Round	23	24	25	26	27	28	29	30	31	32
Ground	A	H	A	H	A	H	H	A	H	A
Result	L	D	L	D	L	W	L	D	W	L
Position	11	11	12	11	12	12	12	12	11	12
Points	21	22	22	23	23	26	26	27	30	30

Source: Niké liga
A = Away; H = Home; W = Win; D = Draw; L = Loss

===== Matches =====
7 March 2026 23	Skalica	1–0	Tatran Prešov	Skalica
15:30 CET (UTC+1)	Daniel 24'; Suľa (yellow card) 76'	Report	Masaryk (yellow card) 51'; Regáli (yellow card) 76'; Olejník (yellow card) 90'	Stadium: Mestský štadión Skalica; Attendance: 402; Referee: Ivan Kružliak; Assistant referees: Ján Pozor, Ákos Juhos

14 March 2026 24	Tatran Prešov	0–0	Komárno	Prešov
15:30 CET (UTC+1)	Sagna (yellow card) 81'; Begala (yellow card) 90'	Report	Mustafić (yellow card) 41'; Kiss (yellow card) 62'; Ganbayar (yellow card) 74'; Rudzan (yellow card) 78'	Stadium: Futbal Tatran Arena; Attendance: 3,299; Referee: Marián Ruc; Assistant referees: Rastislav Kuba, Simeon Vass

21 March 2026 25	Košice	2–1	Tatran Prešov	Košice
18:00 CET (UTC+1)	Čerepkai 12' (pen.); Gallovič 56'; Perišić (yellow card) 82'; Kakay (yellow card) 89'	Report	Taraduda 90'; Souček (yellow card) 90'; Tatolna (yellow card) 90'	Stadium: Košická futbalová aréna Attendance: 7,044; Referee: Ivan Kružliak; Assistant referees: Branislav Hancko, Dušan Štofik

4 April 2026 26	Tatran Prešov	0–0	Ružomberok	Prešov
15:30 CEST (UTC+2)	Barbosa (yellow card) 48'; Bondarenko (yellow card) 65'; Taraduda (yellow card) 89'; Menich (yellow card) 90+3'	Report	Mojžiš (yellow card) 80'; Jevoš (yellow card) 82'; Kelemen (yellow card) 89'	Stadium: Futbal Tatran Arena; Attendance: 3,487; Referee: Bálint Kišš; Assistant referees: Daniel Poláček, Tomáš Vorel

11 April 2026 27	Trenčín	1–0	Tatran Prešov	Trenčín
15:30 CEST (UTC+2)	David 61'; Soares (yellow card) 90'	Report	Menich (yellow card) 89'	Stadium: Štadión Sihoť; Attendance: 1,095; Referee: Filip Glova; Assistant referees: Peter Bednár, Matej Hrebeňár

19 April 2026 28	Tatran Prešov	2–1	Košice	Prešov
18:00 CEST (UTC+2)	Begala 1'; Souček 8'; Taraduda (yellow card) 14'; Menich (yellow card) 45'	Report	Metu (yellow card) 56'; Lichý (yellow card) 90', (goal) 90+2'	Stadium: Futbal Tatran Arena; Attendance: 4,945; Referee: Michal Očenáš; Assistant referees: Milan Štrbo, Tomáš Vorel

26 April 2026 29	Tatran Prešov	0–1	Trenčín	Prešov
17:00 CEST (UTC+2)	Souček (yellow card) 61'	Report	David 41'; Goss (red card) 61'	Stadium: Futbal Tatran Arena; Attendance: 3,466; Referee: Peter Kráľovič; Assistant referees: Dušan Štofik, Matej Zemko

2 May 2026 30	Ružomberok	1–1	Tatran Prešov	Ružomberok
18:00 CEST (UTC+2)	Král 29'; Selecký (yellow card) 84'; Hladík (yellow card) 87'	Report	Begala (yellow card) 53'; Medveděv 63', (yellow card) 90+3'; Tatolna (red card) 84'	Stadium: Štadión pod Čebraťom; Attendance: 1,551; Referee: Bálint Kišš; Assistant referees: Mário Roszbeck, Martin Vitko

9 May 2026 31	Tatran Prešov	3–0	Skalica	Prešov
20:30 CEST (UTC+2)	Regáli 27'; Bernát 32'; Barbosa 47'; Medveděv (yellow card) 60'; Bajza (yellow card) 89'	Report	Mášik (yellow card) 54'; Onyedika (yellow card) 57'; Daniel (yellow card) 88'	Stadium: Futbal Tatran Arena; Attendance: 5,525; Referee: Erik Gemzický; Assistant referees: Adam Jekkel, Daniel Poláček

16 May 2026 32	Komárno	1–0	Tatran Prešov	Zlaté Moravce
17:00 CEST (UTC+2)	Mustafić (yellow card) 26', (yellow card) 34'; Tamás (yellow card) 66'; Dlubáč (yellow card) 80'; Druga (yellow card) 85'; Rudzan (yellow card) 90'	Report	Taraduda (yellow card) 45'; Souček (yellow card) 85'	Stadium: ViOn Aréna; Attendance: 1,950; Referee: Ivan Kružliak; Assistant referees: Ján Pozor, Dušan Štofik

=== Slovak Cup ===
27 August 2025 Second round	Čaňa	1–7	Tatran Prešov	Čaňa
17:00 CEST (UTC+2)	Pazderák 21'; Škovran (yellow card) 62'	Report	Morim 6', 48'; Masaryk 23', 72'; Patika 53'; Sagna 69'; Olejník 79'	Stadium: FK Čaňa; Attendance: 787; Referee: Boris Benedik; Assistant referees: Patrik Kmec, Matej Hrebeňár

8 October 2025 Third round	Družstevník Breznica	0–7	Tatran Prešov	Breznica
15:00 CEST (UTC+2)		Report	Siheyev 10'; Morim 32'; Römling 39', (yellow card) 83'; Regáli 41'; Revenco 45'; Begala 57'; Gáll (yellow card) 79', (goal) 90'	Stadium: TJ Družstevník Breznica - OFK; Attendance: 1,173; Referee: Peter Židišin; Assistant referees: Dávid Bobko, Tomáš Hamráček

21 October 2025 Fourth round	Stará Ľubovňa Redfox	0–3	Tatran Prešov	Stará Ľubovňa
14:30 CEST (UTC+2)	Capko (yellow card) 67'	Report	Morim 33'; Patika 66'; Regáli 76'	Stadium: Futbalový štadión Stará Ľubovňa; Attendance: 336; Referee: Boris Benedik; Assistant referees: Dávid Bobko, Simeon Vass

18 November 2025 Round of 16	Púchov	1–2	Tatran Prešov	Púchov
13:00 CET (UTC+1)	Marcaník 56'; Levai (yellow card) 58'; Obšivan (yellow card) 76' (yellow-red card) 83'; Kopičár (penalty missed) 79'	Report	Morim 22'; Souček 70'; Olejník (yellow card) 71'; Begala (yellow card) 75'; Šimko (yellow card) 77'	Stadium: Mestský štadión Púchov; Attendance: 350; Referee: Marián Ruc; Assistant referees: Tomáš Straka, Dušan Štofik; Fourth official: David Bláha

11 March 2026 Quarter-finals	Tatran Prešov	2–1	Tatran Liptovský Mikuláš	Prešov
18:00 CET (UTC+1)	Masaryk 22'; Simon (yellow card) 50'; Bernát 64'	Report	Bartoš 35'; Piter-Bučko (yellow card) 84'; Kuchárik (yellow card) 90+2'	Stadium: Futbal Tatran Arena; Attendance: 2,766; Referee: Martin Dohál; Assistant referees: Mário Roszbeck, Andrej Hrmo; Fourth official: Lukáš Dzivjak

17 March 2026 Semi-finals First leg	Tatran Prešov	2–2	Košice	Prešov
18:00 CET (UTC+1)	Barbosa 12'; Masaryk 50'	Report	Čerepkai 72'; Kružliak 90'	Stadium: Futbal Tatran Arena; Attendance: 4,884; Referee: Peter Kráľovič; Assistant referees: Milan Štrbo, Martin Vitko; Fourth official: Igor Valent

15 April 2026 Semi-finals Second leg	Košice	2–1 (a.e.t.) (4–3 agg.)	Tatran Prešov	Košice
18:00 CEST (UTC+2)	Krivák (yellow card) 23'; Čerepkai 34'; Dimun (yellow card) 90+4', (goal) 99'; Gallovič (yellow card) 112'; Kružliak (yellow card) 113'; Miljanić (yellow card) 120'	Report	Barbosa 19', (yellow card) 36'; Regáli (yellow card) 26'; Sagna (yellow card) 33'; Souček (yellow card) 70'; Taraduda (yellow card) 84'; Medveděv (yellow card) 90'; Šimko (yellow card) 90+4'	Stadium: Košická futbalová aréna Attendance: 9,662; Referee: Erik Gemzický; Assistant referees: Daniel Poláček, Adam Jekkel; Fourth official: Maroš Libiak
Note: Košice won 4–3 on aggregate.
