= 2025 UEFA European Under-21 Championship qualification Group D =

Group D of the 2025 UEFA European Under-21 Championship qualifying competition consists of six teams: Germany, Poland, Israel, Bulgaria, Kosovo, and Estonia. The composition of the nine groups in the qualifying group stage was decided by the draw held on 2 February 2023 at the UEFA headquarters in Nyon, Switzerland, with the teams seeded according to their coefficient ranking.

== Standings ==
Pos	Team	Pld	W	D	L	GF	GA	GD	Pts	Qualification	Germany	Poland	Bulgaria	Kosovo	Estonia	Israel
1	Germany	10	8	2	0	35	10	+25	26	Final tournament	—	3–1	2–1	0–0	4–1	2–0
2	Poland	10	7	1	2	24	10	+14	22	Final tournament	3–3	—	0–1	3–0	5–0	2–1
3	Bulgaria	10	4	3	3	17	12	+5	15		2–3	1–3	—	1–1	6–0	1–0
4	Kosovo	10	3	3	4	10	17	−7	12		0–3	0–4	2–2	—	2–0	3–1
5	Estonia	10	2	1	7	7	31	−24	7		1–10	0–1	1–1	3–1	—	1–0
6	Israel	10	1	0	9	5	18	−13	3		1–5	1–2	0–1	0–1	1–0	—

Source: UEFA
Rules for classification: Tiebreakers

== Matches ==
Times are CET/CEST, (Note: CEST (UTC+2) for dates between 26 March and 29 October 2023 and between 31 March and 27 October 2024, and CET (UTC+1) for all other dates.) as listed by UEFA (local times, if different, are in parentheses).

20 June 2023
20:00

Kosovo	2–0	Estonia
Llugiqi 40'; Hoti 70'	Report

Fadil Vokrri Stadium, Pristina
Attendance: 2,000
Referee: Joey Kooij (Netherlands)

7 September 2023
16:30 (17:30 EEST)

Estonia	1–1	Bulgaria
Šapovalov 15' (pen.)	Report	G. Nikolov 8'

Kadriorg Stadium, Tallinn
Attendance: 327
Referee: Jasper Vergoote (Belgium)

8 September 2023
20:00

Poland	3–0	Kosovo
Mosór 25'; Rakoczy 30', 44'	Report

Orlen Stadion im. Kazimierza Górskiego, Płock
Attendance: 6,265
Referee: Lothar D'hondt (Belgium)

12 September 2023
18:00 (19:00 EEST)

Estonia	0–1	Poland
	Report	Szymczak 81'

Lilleküla Stadium, Tallinn
Attendance: 379
Referee: Stefan Ebner (Austria)
12 September 2023
18:00 (19:00 EEST)

Bulgaria	1–0	Israel
N. Iliev 50'	Report

Stadion Aleksandar Shalamanov, Sofia
Attendance: 354
Referee: Irakli Kvirikashvili (Georgia)
12 September 2023
19:00

Kosovo	0–3	Germany
	Report	Moukoko 74', 78'; Kleine-Bekel 89'

Fadil Vokrri Stadium, Pristina
Attendance: 1,950
Referee: Mikkel Redder (Denmark)

13 October 2023
18:15 (19:15 EEST)

Bulgaria	2–3	Germany
Shopov 25'; N. Iliev 90+3'	Report	Moukoko 40', 49', 69'

Stadion Aleksandar Shalamanov, Sofia
Attendance: 1,223
Referee: Nathan Verboomen (Belgium)

17 October 2023
17:30 (18:30 EEST)

Bulgaria	1–1	Kosovo
Sorakov 90+1'	Report	Tahiri 8' (pen.)

Stadion Aleksandar Shalamanov, Sofia
Attendance: 358
Referee: Jan Petrik (Czech Republic)
17 October 2023
18:00

Poland	5–0	Estonia
Rakoczy 8'; Zalewski 22'; Szymczak 44', 58'; Pieńko 72'	Report

Podkarpackie Centrum Piłki Nożnej, Stalowa Wola
Attendance: 3,544
Referee: Mohammad Usman Aslam (Norway)

17 November 2023
13:00

Kosovo	2–2	Bulgaria
Tahiri 34', 59'	Report	Sorakov 8'; Petkov 45'

Zahir Pajaziti Stadium, Podujevë
Attendance: 200
Referee: Patrik Kolarić (Croatia)
17 November 2023
16:00

Poland	2–1	Israel
Matysik 59'; Włodarczyk 82'	Report	Binyamin 90+4'

Stadion im. Władysława Króla, Łódź
Attendance: 3,269
Referee: Jovan Kachevski (North Macedonia)
17 November 2023
18:00

Germany	4–1	Estonia
Beier 39'; Moukoko 53'; Reitz 88', 90+4'	Report	Kuraksin 64'

Benteler-Arena, Paderborn
Attendance: 5,493
Referee: Daniyar Sakhi (Kazakhstan)

21 November 2023
13:00

Kosovo	3–1	Israel
Krasniqi 6', 10'; Tusha 80'	Report	Nahmani 24'

Zahir Pajaziti Stadium, Podujevë
Attendance: 0 (Note: Due to the Gaza war protests, the Kosovo v Israel match was played behind closed doors.)
Referee: Iwan Arwel Griffith (Wales)
21 November 2023
17:00 (18:00 EET)

Bulgaria	6–0	Estonia
G. Nikolov 50', 60', 85'; Veering 65' (o.g.); Mitkov 66'; Raychev 88'	Report

Stadion Aleksandar Shalamanov, Sofia
Attendance: 178
Referee: David Dickinson (Scotland)
21 November 2023
18:00

Germany	3–1	Poland
Martel 56'; Woltemade 79'; Röhl 82'	Report	Mosór 24'

Stadion an der Hafenstraße, Essen
Attendance: 8,559
Referee: Kyriakos Athanasiou (Cyprus)

21 March 2024
17:30

Israel	1–2	Poland
Yona 5'	Report	Pingot 57'; Szmyt 89'

Ernst-Abbe-Sportfeld, Jena (Germany) (Note: Due to the Gaza war, Israel are required to play their home matches at neutral venues until further notice.)
Referee: Pierre Gaillouste (France)

22 March 2024
18:00

Germany	0–0	Kosovo
	Report

Stadion an der Gellertstraße, Chemnitz
Attendance: 6,899
Referee: Daniele Chiffi (Italy)

26 March 2024
15:00

Poland	0–1	Bulgaria
	Report	Petkov 58'

Stadion Śląski, Chorzów
Attendance: 5,498
Referee: Christian-Petru Ciochirca (Austria)
26 March 2024
18:00

Germany	2–0	Israel
Gruda 14'; Röhl 56'	Report

Leuna Chemie Stadion, Halle
Attendance: 4,766
Referee: John Brooks (England)

4 September 2024 (Note: The Israel v Germany match was originally to be played on 17 October 2023, 18:30 (19:30 IST), but was postponed due to the Gaza war.)
18:00

Israel	1–5	Germany
Yehoshua 64'	Report	Tresoldi 5', 35'; Adeyemi 15', 61'; Knauff 90+4'

Ménfői úti Stadion, Győr (Hungary)
Attendance: 0 (Note: Due to the Gaza war protests, the Israel v Germany match was played behind closed doors.)
Referee: Henrik Nalbandyan (Armenia)

7 September 2024 (Note: The Israel v Estonia match was originally to be played on 12 October 2023, 18:00 (19:00 IST), but was postponed due to the Gaza war.)
20:00

Israel	1–0	Estonia
Madmon 67' (pen.)	Report

Ménfői úti Stadion, Győr (Hungary)
Attendance: 0 (Note: Due to the Gaza war protests, the Israel v Estonia match was played behind closed doors.)
Referee: Jamie Robinson (Northern Ireland)

10 September 2024
18:00 (19:00 EEST)

Estonia	1–10	Germany
Šapovalov 69'	Report	Woltemade 23' (pen.), 47'; Tresoldi 31'; Adeyemi 35', 44', 61'; Martel 39'; Rosenfelder 59'; Lemperle 87'; Knauff 90'

Kadriorg Stadium, Tallinn
Attendance: 2,672
Referee: Antoine Chiaramonti (Andorra)
10 September 2024
18:00 (19:00 EEST)

Bulgaria	1–3	Poland
Tsenov 29'	Report	Szymczak 52'; Pieńko 56'; Kałuziński 78' (pen.)

Stadion Aleksandar Shalamanov, Sofia
Attendance: 475
Referee: Joey Kooij (Netherlands)
10 September 2024
19:00

Israel	0–1	Kosovo
	Report	Avdyli 11'

Ménfői úti Stadion, Győr (Hungary)
Referee: Menelaos Antoniou (Cyprus)

10 October 2024
18:00

Estonia	1–0	Israel
Varjund 71'	Report

Kadriorg Stadium, Tallinn
Attendance: 227
Referee: Dmytro Panchyshyn (Ukraine)

11 October 2024
18:00

Germany	2–1	Bulgaria
Beier 9'; Woltemade 66' (pen.)	Report	N. Iliev 37'

Jahnstadion, Regensburg
Attendance: 8,586
Referee: Ben Mcmaster (Northern Ireland)
11 October 2024
19:00

Kosovo	0–4	Poland
	Report	Fornalczyk 21'; Szymczak 25'; Marczuk 30'; Kałuziński 45+2' (pen.)

Fadil Vokrri Stadium, Pristina
Attendance: 200
Referee: Ladislav Szikszay (Czech Republic)

15 October 2024
17:00

Estonia	3–1	Kosovo
Teeväli 21' (pen.); Kristal 44'; Usta 87'	Report	Avdyli 77'

Kadriorg Stadium, Tallinn
Attendance: 178
Referee: Jason Barcelo (Gibraltar)
15 October 2024
17:00

Poland	3–3	Germany
Marczuk 17'; Kałuziński 49'; Fornalczyk 59'	Report	Tresoldi 3'; Wanner 21'; Arrey-Mbi 30'

Stadion Widzewa, Łódź
Attendance: 11,496
Referee: Dario Bel (Croatia)
15 October 2024
18:00

Israel	0–1	Bulgaria
	Report	Iliev 46'

Ménfői úti Stadion, Győr (Hungary)
Referee: Michele Beltrano (San Marino)

== Goalscorers ==
There have been 98 goals scored in 30 matches, for an average of 3.27 goals per match.

6 goals

- (Germany) Youssoufa Moukoko

5 goals

- (Germany) Karim Adeyemi
- (Poland) Filip Szymczak

4 goals

- (Bulgaria) Nikola Iliev
- (Bulgaria) Georgi Nikolov
- (Germany) Nicolò Tresoldi
- (Germany) Nick Woltemade

3 goals

- (Kosovo) Ardit Tahiri
- (Poland) Jakub Kałuziński
- (Poland) Michał Rakoczy

2 goals

- (Bulgaria) Marin Petkov
- (Bulgaria) Martin Sorakov
- (Estonia) Aleksandr Šapovalov
- (Germany) Maximilian Beier
- (Germany) Ansgar Knauff
- (Germany) Eric Martel
- (Germany) Rocco Reitz
- (Germany) Merlin Röhl
- (Kosovo) Milot Avdyli
- (Kosovo) Bleron Krasniqi
- (Poland) Mariusz Fornalczyk
- (Poland) Dominik Marczuk
- (Poland) Ariel Mosór
- (Poland) Tomasz Pieńko

1 goal

- (Bulgaria) Asen Mitkov
- (Bulgaria) Roberto Raychev
- (Bulgaria) Stanislav Shopov
- (Bulgaria) Emil Tsenov
- (Estonia) Patrik Kristal
- (Estonia) Danil Kuraksin
- (Estonia) Tristan Toomas Teeväli
- (Estonia) Taaniel Usta
- (Estonia) Tony Varjund
- (Estonia) Robert Veering
- (Germany) Bright Arrey-Mbi
- (Germany) Brajan Gruda
- (Germany) Colin Kleine-Bekel
- (Germany) Tim Lemperle
- (Germany) Max Rosenfelder
- (Germany) Paul Wanner
- (Israel) Ran Binyamin
- (Israel) Elad Madmon
- (Israel) Stav Nahmani
- (Israel) Adi Yona
- (Israel) Niv Yehoshua
- (Kosovo) Andi Hoti
- (Kosovo) Arian Llugiqi
- (Kosovo) Veton Tusha
- (Poland) Miłosz Matysik
- (Poland) Maksymilian Pingot
- (Poland) Kajetan Szmyt
- (Poland) Szymon Włodarczyk
- (Poland) Nicola Zalewski
