= Ofir Kopel =

Israeli footballer

Ofir Kopel אופיר קופל
Personal information
- Full name: Ofir Kopel
- Date of birth: 25 April 1975 (age 51)
- Place of birth: Petah Tikva, Israel
- Height: 1.78 m (5 ft 10 in)
- Position: Midfielder

Team information
- Current team: Hapoel Rishon LeZion

Youth career
- Hapoel Petah Tikva

Senior career*
Years	Team	Apps	(Gls)
1991–1996	Hapoel Petah Tikva	81	(3)
1996–2000	Maccabi Haifa	76	(1)
1999–2000	→ Hapoel Kfar Saba (loan)	31	(1)
2000–2002	Maccabi Petah Tikva	53	(2)
2002–2003	Hapoel Kfar Saba	21	(0)
Total		262	(7)

International career
1994–1997	Israel U21	27	(0)
1998	Israel	1	(0)

Managerial career
- 2006–2009: Hapoel Petah Tikva (youth)
- 2008–2009: Hapoel Petah Tikva (assistant)
- 2009–2011: Hapoel Kiryat Ono
- 2011–2014: Hapoel Tel Aviv (youth)
- 2018–2019: Hapoel Rishon LeZion (youth)
- 2019–2020: Bnei Yehuda (youth)
- 2021–2022: Hapoel Rishon LeZion (youth)
- 2024: Hapoel Rishon LeZion
- * Club domestic league appearances and goals

Ofir Kopel (Hebrew: אופיר קופל) is a former Israeli footballer who played for Hapoel Petah Tikva and Maccabi Haifa.

== Honours ==
- Israel State Cup (1):
  - 1992, 1998
