= Israel national under-21 football team =

Israel Under-21
- Nickname(s): הנבחרת הצעירה (The Young Chosen Team) התכולים-לבנים (The Skyblue and Whites)
- Association: Israel Football Association
- Confederation: UEFA (Europe; 1990s–present)
- Head coach: Guy Luzon
- Captain: Ethan Azoulay
- Most caps: Arik Benado (39)
- Top scorer: Alon Mizrahi (15)
- FIFA code: ISR
| First colours | Second colours |

First international
- Israel 2–2 Greece (Xanthi, Greece; 21 November 1990)

Biggest win
- Israel 6–0 Austria (Herzliya, Israel; 26 October 1993)

Biggest defeat
- Israel 0–4 Spain (Herzliya, Israel; 13 October 1998); Israel 0–4 Portugal (Groningen, Netherlands; 16 June 2007); Israel 0–4 Italy (Tel Aviv, Israel; 8 June 2013); Republic of Ireland 4–0 Israel (Dublin, Ireland; 9 October 2017); Israel 1–5 Germany (Győr, Hungary; 4 September 2024)

UEFA U-21 Championship
- Appearances: 3 (first in 2007)
- Best result: Semi-finals (2023)

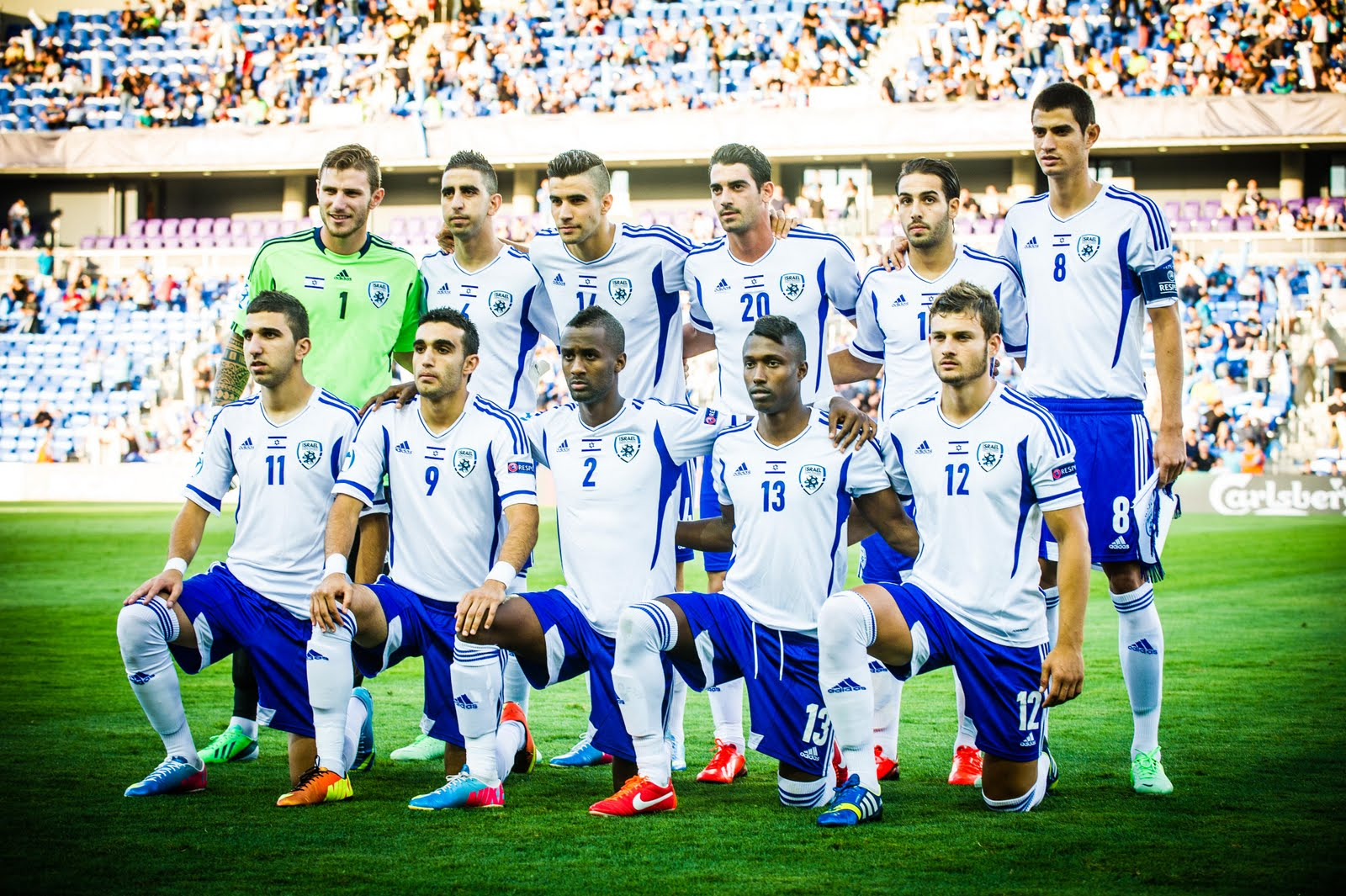
Israel line-up against Norway in opening match during UEFA U-21 European Championships

The Israel national under-21 football team (Hebrew: הנבחרת הצעירה של ישראל בכדורגל עד גיל 21) is the national under-21 football team of Israel, and is controlled by the Israel Football Association (IFA). It is considered to be the feeder team for the senior Israel national football team.

This team consists of Israeli players aged 21 or under at the start of each two-year UEFA European Under-21 Championship campaign, so players can be, and often are, up to 23 years old. Team members may also simultaneously qualify to various teams for Under-20s (for non-UEFA tournaments), Under-19s and Under 17s, or even the senior national team, so long as theymeet the respective age restriction. It is also possible to play for one country at youth level and another at senior level (provided the player is eligible).

The U-21 team has been constructed following Israel's acceptance as a full member of UEFA. A draw in a qualifier against Greece in Greece was Israel U-21s' first fixture during the early 1990s.

Israel U-21s do not have a permanent home. They play in stadia dotted all around Israel in an attempt to encourage fans in all areas of the country to support the team. Because of the lesser interest compared to the senior national team, smaller grounds are usually used (such as HaMoshava Stadium in Petah Tikva, Israel).

The team qualified for the European Championships for the first time in 2007, reaching the final stage held in the Netherlands, after beating the French Under-21 team 2–1 on aggregate.

== Competitive history ==
There is no Under-21 World Cup, although there is an Under-20 World Cup. European U-21 teams compete for the European Championship, with the finals every even-numbered year. It will be held in odd-numbered years from 2007. Israel has never fared well in European Under-21 Football Championships.

The current campaign started shortly after the 2006 finals – the qualification stage of the 2007 competition. UEFA have decided to shift the next tournament forward to avoid a clash with senior tournaments taking place in even-numbered years. The competition has therefore been reduced as qualifying must be completed in a year's less time. In their three-team qualification group, Israel finished ahead of Turkey and Wales. In the two-legged play-off against France for a place in the final stage, the team achieved a surprising 1–1 draw in France, and won the home match 1–0, with Amir Taga scoring in stoppage time.

Note: The year of the tournament represents the year in which it ends.

== Competitive record ==
=== UEFA European Under-21 Championship ===
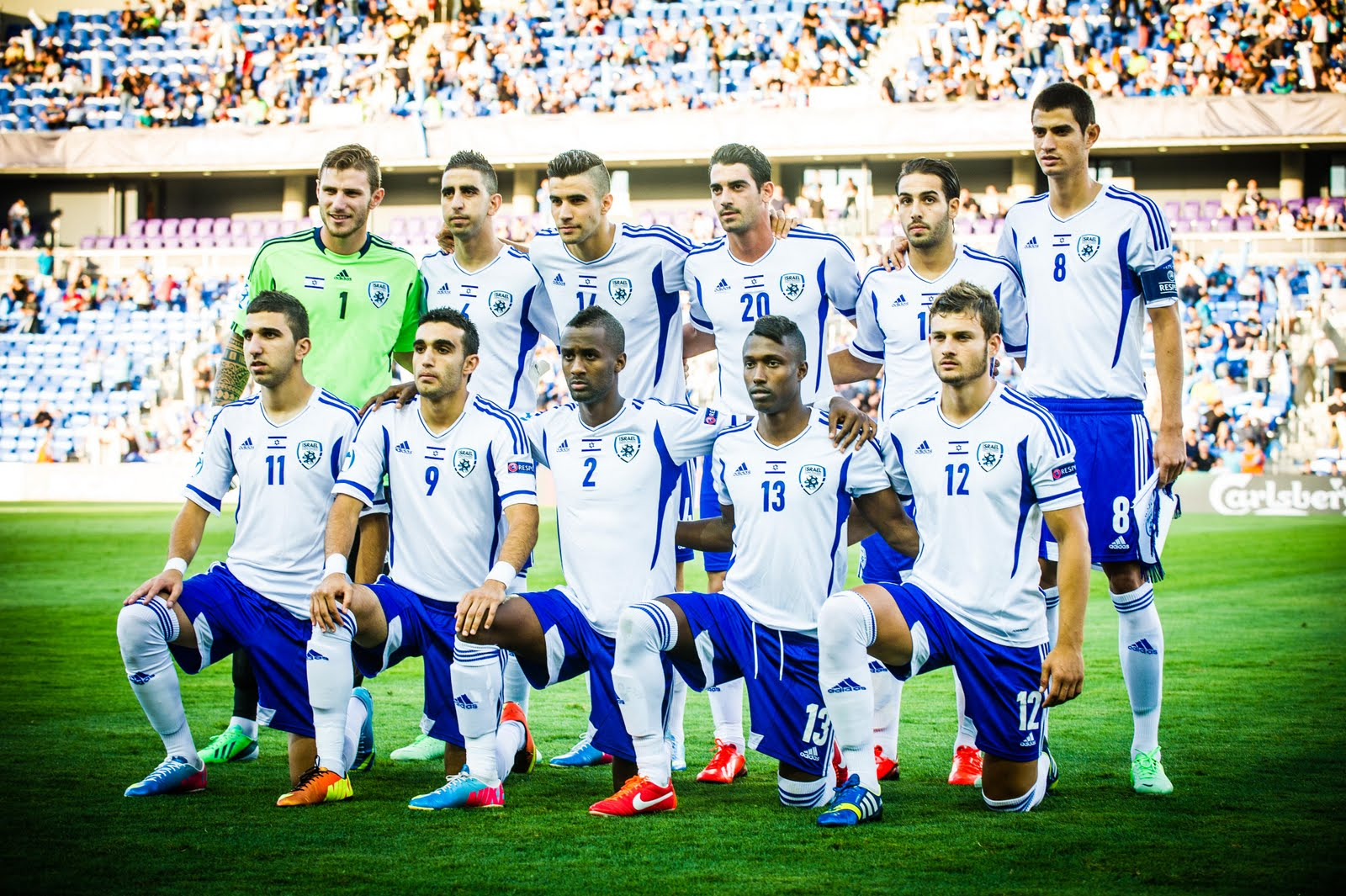
The Israeli U21 squad at the final-tournament of the 2013 UEFA Euros Under-21 that was hosted by Israel

| UEFA U-21 Championship Record | | | | | | | | | Qualification record | | | | | |
| Year | Round | Pld | W | D* | L | GF | GA | Squad | Pld | W | D* | L | GF | GA |
| (Europe) 1992 | Did not qualify | | | | | | | | 6 | 3 | 2 | 1 | 11 | 6 |
| (France) 1994 | Did not qualify | | | | | | | | 10 | 3 | 1 | 6 | 17 | 16 |
| (Spain) 1996 | Did not qualify | | | | | | | | 10 | 3 | 3 | 4 | 12 | 11 |
| (Romania) 1998 | Did not qualify | | | | | | | | 8 | 5 | 2 | 1 | 17 | 9 |
| (Slovakia) 2000 | Did not qualify | | | | | | | | 8 | 2 | 2 | 4 | 6 | 13 |
| (Switzerland) 2002 | Did not qualify | | | | | | | | 8 | 4 | 0 | 4 | 16 | 13 |
| (Germany) 2004 | Did not qualify | | | | | | | | 8 | 3 | 1 | 4 | 6 | 11 |
| (Portugal) 2006 | Did not qualify | | | | | | | | 8 | 4 | 3 | 1 | 11 | 7 |
| (Netherlands) 2007 | Group Stage | 3 | 0 | 0 | 3 | 0 | 6 | Squad | 4 | 2 | 2 | 0 | 5 | 3 |
| (Sweden) 2009 | Did not qualify | | | | | | | | 10 | 5 | 3 | 2 | 17 | 8 |
| (Denmark) 2011 | Did not qualify | | | | | | | | 8 | 5 | 1 | 2 | 18 | 8 |
| (Israel) 2013 | Group Stage | 3 | 1 | 1 | 1 | 3 | 6 | Squad | Qualified as host | | | | | |
| (Czech Republic) 2015 | Did not qualify | | | | | | | | 8 | 5 | 0 | 3 | 22 | 15 |
| (Poland) 2017 | Did not qualify | | | | | | | | 10 | 6 | 3 | 1 | 21 | 4 |
| (Italy) (San Marino) 2019 | Did not qualify | | | | | | | | 10 | 4 | 2 | 4 | 17 | 18 |
| (Hungary) (Slovenia) 2021 | Did not qualify | | | | | | | | 10 | 3 | 4 | 3 | 12 | 14 |
| (Romania) (Georgia (country)) 2023 | Semi-final | 5 | 1 | 2 | 2 | 2 | 6 | Squad | 12 | 6 | 3 | 3 | 20 | 11 |
| (Slovakia) 2025 | Did not qualify | | | | | | | | 10 | 1 | 0 | 9 | 5 | 18 |
| Total | 3/17 | 11 | 2 | 3 | 6 | 5 | 18 | - | 148 | 64 | 32 | 52 | 233 | 185 |

== 2023 UEFA European Under-21 Championship ==
=== Qualifiers – Group B ===
| Pos | Team | Pld | W | D | L | GF | GA | GD | Pts | Qualification | Germany | Poland | Bulgaria | Kosovo | Estonia | Israel |
|---|---|---|---|---|---|---|---|---|---|---|---|---|---|---|---|---|
| 1 | Germany | 10 | 8 | 2 | 0 | 35 | 10 | +25 | 26 | Final tournament | — | 3–1 | 2–1 | 0–0 | 4–1 | 2–0 |
| 2 | Poland | 10 | 7 | 1 | 2 | 24 | 10 | +14 | 22 | Final tournament | 3–3 | — | 0–1 | 3–0 | 5–0 | 2–1 |
| 3 | Bulgaria | 10 | 4 | 3 | 3 | 17 | 12 | +5 | 15 | | 2–3 | 1–3 | — | 1–1 | 6–0 | 1–0 |
| 4 | Kosovo | 10 | 3 | 3 | 4 | 10 | 17 | −7 | 12 | | 0–3 | 0–4 | 2–2 | — | 2–0 | 3–1 |
| 5 | Estonia | 10 | 2 | 1 | 7 | 7 | 31 | −24 | 7 | | 1–10 | 0–1 | 1–1 | 3–1 | — | 1–0 |
| 6 | Israel | 10 | 1 | 0 | 9 | 5 | 18 | −13 | 3 | | 1–5 | 1–2 | 0–1 | 0–1 | 1–0 | — |

Source: UEFA
Legend: Blue = home team win; Yellow = draw; Red = away team win.
Rules for classification: Tiebreakers

==== Qualifiers play-offs ====
The four play-off winners qualify for the final tournament.

| Team 1 | Agg. | Team 2 | 1st leg | 2nd leg |
|---|---|---|---|---|
| Croatia | 3–3 (5–4 p) | Denmark | 2–1 | 1–2 (a.e.t.) |
| Slovakia | 3–5 | Ukraine | 3–2 | 0–3 |
| Republic of Ireland | 1–1 (1–3 p) | Israel | 1–1 | 0–0 (a.e.t.) |
| Iceland | 1–2 | Czech Republic | 1–2 | 0–0 |

=== 2023 UEFA European Under-21 Championship group stage (Final tournament) ===
| Pos | Team | Pld | W | D | L | GF | GA | GD | Pts | Qualification |
|---|---|---|---|---|---|---|---|---|---|---|
| 1 | England | 3 | 3 | 0 | 0 | 6 | 0 | +6 | 9 | Advance to knockout stage |
| 2 | Israel | 3 | 1 | 1 | 1 | 2 | 3 | −1 | 4 | Advance to knockout stage |
| 3 | Czech Republic | 3 | 1 | 0 | 2 | 2 | 4 | −2 | 3 | |
| 4 | Germany | 3 | 0 | 1 | 2 | 2 | 5 | −3 | 1 | |

Source: UEFA
Rules for classification: Tiebreakers

=== Knockout stage ===
In the knockout stage, extra time and a penalty shoot-out are used to decide the winners if necessary. As France qualified as hosts and England are ineligible for the 2024 Summer Olympics, their results will be used to determine whether an Olympic play-off match would be required and who would participate.

==== Bracket ====
Quarter-finals
1 July – Boris Paichadze Stadium
Georgia | 0 (3)
Israel (p) | 0 (4)
2 July – Ramaz Shengelia Stadium
England | 1
Portugal | 0
1 July – Stadionul Rapid-Giulești
Spain (a.e.t.) | 2
Switzerland | 1
2 July – Cluj Arena
France | 1
Ukraine | 3

Semi-finals
5 July – Adjarabet Arena
Israel | 0
England | 3
5 July – Stadionul Steaua
Spain | 5
Ukraine | 1

Final
8 July – Adjarabet Arena
England | 1
Spain | 0

== Results and fixtures ==
Win Draw Loss

== Coaching staff ==
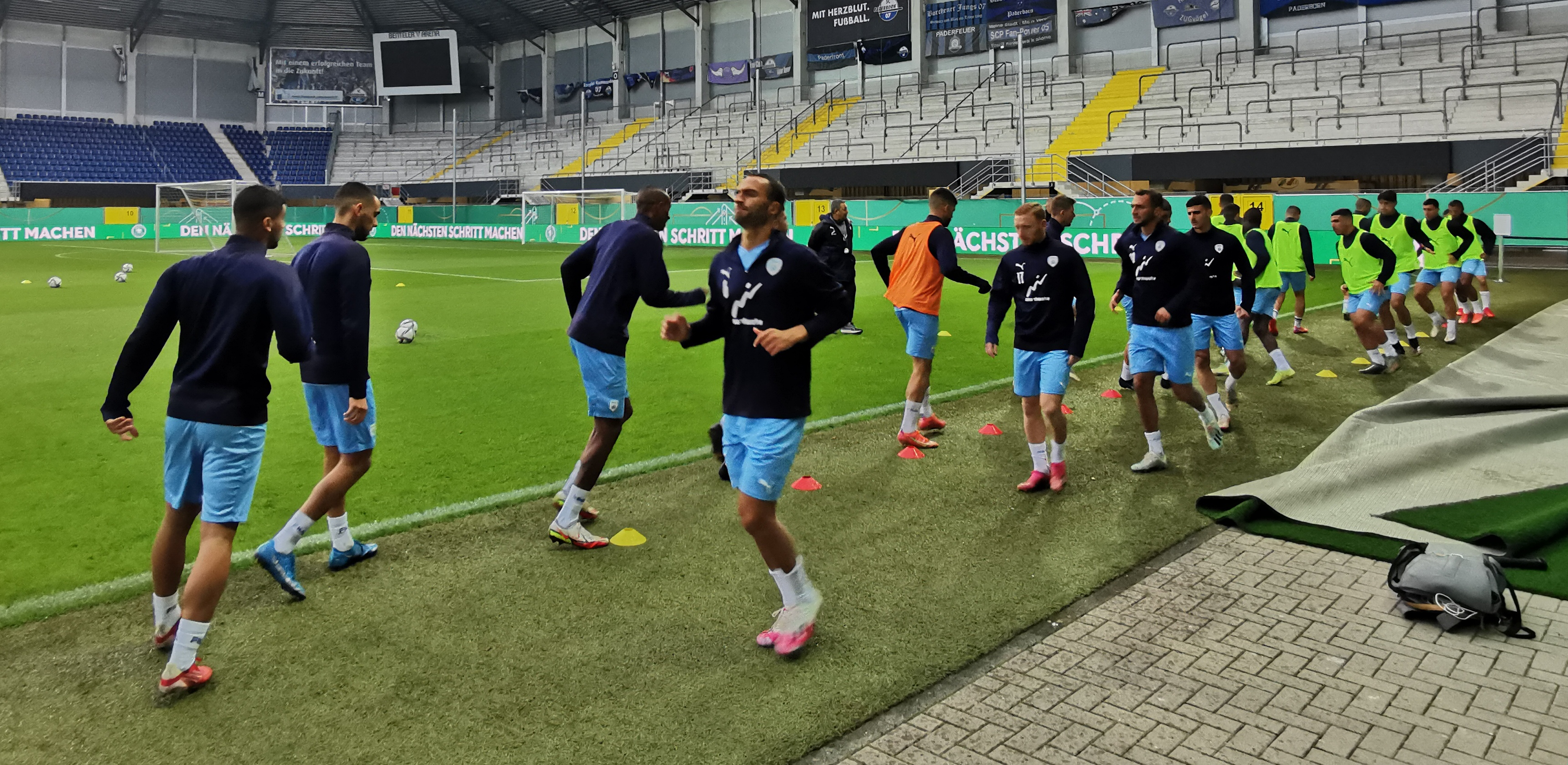
Israel U21's last practice ahead of the 2023 UEFA Euros Under-21 qualifiers away match against Germany U21

As of 22 June 2023

| Position | Name |
|---|---|
| Head coach | (Israel) Guy Luzon |
| Assistant Coach | (Israel) Haim Cohen |
| Fitness Coach | (Israel) Yossi Kakun |
| Fitness Coach | (Israel) Lidor Ganon |
| Goalkeeping Coach | (Israel) Victor Buchnik |
| Analyst | (Israel) Liron Glat |

== Players ==
=== Current squad ===
- The following players were called up for the 2027 UEFA European Under-21 Championship qualification matches against Slovenia and Norway on 29 September and 6 October 2026; respectively
- Caps and goals correct as of: 6 October 2026, after the match against Norway

Bolded names denote players who have been capped for the senior team.

| No. | Pos. | Player | Date of birth (age) | Caps | Goals | Club |
|---|---|---|---|---|---|---|
| | GK | Dor Binyamini | 6 May 2005 (age 21) | 6 | 0 | (Israel Football Association) Hapoel Tel Aviv |
| | GK | Ofek Melika | 23 January 2005 (age 21) | 5 | 0 | (Israel Football Association) /Maccabi Tel Aviv |
| | GK | Amit Reif | 18 January 2004 (age 22) | 0 | 0 | (Israel Football Association) Hapoel Ramat Gan |
| | DF | Noam Ben Harush | 13 May 2005 (age 21) | 15 | 1 | (Israel Football Association) Maccabi Tel Aviv |
| | DF | Maor Yashilirmak | 16 January 2005 (age 21) | 9 | 0 | (Israel Football Association) F.C. Ashdod |
| | DF | Noam Schwartz | 15 July 2006 (age 20) | 5 | 0 | (Israel Football Association) Hapoel Ramat Gan |
| | DF | Noam Shtaifman | 28 February 2008 (age 18) | 2 | 0 | (Israel Football Association) Maccabi Haifa |
| | DF | Benny Feldman | 27 November 2006 (age 19) | 0 | 0 | (Israel Football Association) Maccabi Netanya |
| | DF | Bashar Abdah | 1 December 2004 (age 21) | 0 | 0 | (Israel Football Association) Maccabi Petah Tikva |
| | DF | Shay Sabah | 6 December 2004 (age 21) | 0 | 0 | (Israel Football Association) Ironi Kiryat Shmona |
| | MF | Niv Yehoshua | 28 January 2005 (age 21) | 16 | 2 | (Israel Football Association) Hapoel Be'er Sheva |
| | MF | Ran Binyamin | 6 February 2004 (age 22) | 15 | 6 | (United States Soccer Federation) FC Dallas |
| | MF | **Tai Abed** | 3 August 2004 (age 22) | 14 | 3 | (Royal Spanish Football Federation) Valladolid |
| | MF | Ido Cohen | 17 February 2005 (age 21) | 10 | 0 | (Israel Football Association) Maccabi Petah Tikva |
| | MF | Roy Nawi | 4 March 2004 (age 22) | 8 | 0 | (Ukrainian Association of Football) Kryvbas |
| | MF | Roei Alkukin | 7 April 2004 (age 22) | 4 | 0 | (Israel Football Association) Hapoel Tel Aviv |
| | MF | Liran Hazan | 10 May 2006 (age 20) | 3 | 0 | (Israel Football Association) Maccabi Petah Tikva |
| | MF | Dagats Worko | 1 August 2004 (age 22) | 3 | 0 | (Israel Football Association) Beitar Jerusalem |
| | MF | Orian Goren | 15 March 2009 (age 17) | 2 | 0 | (Royal Spanish Football Federation) Barcelona Juvenil |
| | MF | Navot Ratner | 6 June 2007 (age 19) | 1 | 0 | (Israel Football Association) Maccabi Haifa |
| | FW | Mohamad Abu Rumi | 10 March 2004 (age 22) | 17 | 2 | (Israel Football Association) Hapoel Be'er Sheva |
| | FW | Daniel Dappa | 21 September 2007 (age 19) | 7 | 1 | (Israel Football Association) Hapoel Tel Aviv |
| | FW | Eyad Khalaily | 2 July 2006 (age 20) | 7 | 0 | (Israel Football Association) Maccabi Haifa |
| | FW | Niv Gabay | 15 July 2007 (age 19) | 2 | 0 | (Israel Football Association) Ironi Kiryat Shmona |
| | FW | Mor Buskila | 1 August 2004 (age 22) | 1 | 0 | (Israel Football Association) Hapoel Tel Aviv |

- Maccabi Haifa defender Lisav Naif Eissat was also called up. On 2 September 2025, his request to switch international allegiance to Romania was approved by FIFA.

=== Recent call-ups ===
The following players have previously been called up to the Israel under-21 squad in the last 12 months and remain eligible for selection.

| Pos. | Player | Date of birth (age) | Caps | Goals | Club | Latest call-up |
|---|---|---|---|---|---|---|
| GK | Shon Ben Nesher | 1 October 2005 (age 21) | 0 | 0 | (Israel) Maccabi Herzliya | v. Bosnia and Herzegovina, 31 March 2026 |
| DF | Yinon Feingezicht | 1 May 2007 (age 19) | 2 | 0 | (Israel) Maccabi Haifa | v. Bosnia and Herzegovina, 31 March 2026 |
| DF | Ziv Leigh | 1 April 2004 (age 22) | 1 | 0 | (Israel) Maccabi Herzliya | v. Bosnia and Herzegovina, 31 March 2026 |
| DF | Yonatan Laish | 27 January 2005 (age 21) | 2 | 0 | (Israel) Hapoel Jerusalem | v. Bosnia and Herzegovina, 31 March 2026 |
| DF | **Nikita Stoinov** | 24 August 2005 (age 21) | 10 | 0 | (Romania) Dinamo București | v. Bosnia and Herzegovina, 31 March 2026 |
| DF | Guy Dezent | 1 November 2005 (age 21) | 3 | 0 | (Israel) Maccabi Petah Tikva | v. Hungary, 20 March 2026^{PRE} |
| DF | Jonatan Agiyapong | 1 August 2004 (age 22) | 0 | 0 | (Israel) Bnei Yehuda | v. Hungary, 20 March 2026^{PRE} |
| MF | Bar Lin | 8 August 2004 (age 22) | 8 | 1 | (Ukraine) Kryvbas Kryvyi Rih | v. Bosnia and Herzegovina, 31 March 2026 |
| MF | Yanai Distelfeld | 1 August 2005 (age 21) | 8 | 1 | (Israel) Hapoel Jerusalem | v. Bosnia and Herzegovina, 31 March 2026 |
| MF | Amit Lemkin | 26 October 2005 (age 21) | 2 | 0 | (Israel) Hapoel Tel Aviv | v. Bosnia and Herzegovina, 31 March 2026 |
| MF | Adi Yona | 17 April 2004 (age 22) | 11 | 1 | (Israel) Beitar Jerusalem | v. Hungary, 20 March 2026^{PRE} |
| MF | Anis Porat Ayash | 15 April 2005 (age 21) | 1 | 0 | (Israel) Maccabi Tel Aviv | v. Hungary, 20 March 2026^{PRE} |
| FW | **Sayed Abu Farchi** | 11 May 2006 (age 20) | 10 | 0 | (United States) Colorado Rapids | v. Bosnia and Herzegovina, 31 March 2026 |
| FW | Karem Zoabi | 3 May 2006 (age 20) | 6 | 0 | (Portugal) Torreense | v. Bosnia and Herzegovina, 31 March 2026 |
| FW | Yoav Koren | 1 November 2005 (age 21) | 1 | 0 | (Israel) Hapoel Be'er Sheva | v. Bosnia and Herzegovina, 31 March 2026 |
| FW | Ahmed Salman | 22 March 2004 (age 22) | 0 | 0 | (Israel) Bnei Sakhnin | v. Hungary, 20 March 2026^{PRE} |
| FW | Nehoray Dabush | 18 October 2004 (age 22) | 0 | 0 | (Israel) F.C. Ashdod | v. Hungary, 20 March 2026^{PRE} |
^{INJ} Withdrew due to injury or illness^{PRE} Preliminary/extended squad^{RET} Retired from the national team^{SUS} Serving suspension due to either a red card, or two accumulated yellow cards^{WD} Player withdrew from the squad due to neither injury nor illness issue^{U21} Player withdrew from the squad to play for the national under-21 team

== Records ==
=== Most capped players ===
| Rank | Player | Club(s) | Career | U-21 Caps |
|---|---|---|---|---|
| 1 | Arik Benado | Maccabi Haifa, Beitar Jerusalem | 1992–1995 | 39 |
| 2 | Nir Sivilia | Maccabi Tel Aviv, Bnei Yehuda Tel Aviv, Beitar Jerusalem | 1993–1997 | 34 |
| 2 | Shay Holtzman | Maccabi Netanya, Maccabi Haifa, Tzafririm Holon | 1992–1995 | 34 |
| 3 | Dekel Keinan | Maccabi Haifa, Bnei Sakhnin, Maccabi Netanya | 2003–2007 | 30 |
| 4 | Alon Halfon | Maccabi Netanya, Hapoel Haifa | 1993–1995 | 29 |
| 4 | Tom Almadon | Maccabi Haifa | 2004–2007 | 29 |
| 5 | Ofer Talker | Maccabi Ironi Ashdod, Hapoel Haifa | 1992–1995 | 28 |
| 6 | Ofir Kopel | Maccabi Haifa | 1994–1997 | 27 |
| 7 | Lior Jan | Maccabi Tel Aviv | 2006–2008 | 26 |
| 8 | Moshe Ohayon | Ashdod | 2001–2005 | 24 |

Note: Club(s) represents the permanent clubs during the player's time in the Under-21s. Those players in bold are still eligible to play for the team.

=== Leading goalscorers ===
| Rank | Player | Club(s) | Career | U-21 Goals |
|---|---|---|---|---|
| 1 | Alon Mizrahi | Bnei Yehuda Tel Aviv | 1992–1993 | 15 |
| 2 | Shay Holtzman | Maccabi Netanya, Maccabi Haifa, Tzafririm Holon | 1992–1995 | 14 |
| 3 | Mu'nas Dabbur | Maccabi Tel Aviv, Grasshopper | 2011–2014 | 13 |
| 4 | Nir Sivilia | Maccabi Tel Aviv, Bnei Yehuda Tel Aviv, Beitar Jerusalem | 1993–1997 | 12 |
| 5 | Ben Sahar | Chelsea, Espanyol | 2007–2010 | 8 |
| 5 | Maor Buzaglo | Maccabi Haifa, Hapoel Petah Tikva, Bnei Sakhnin, Maccabi Tel Aviv | 2007–2010 | 8 |
| 6 | Eli Abarbanel | Hapoel Petah Tikva | 1994–1999 | 7 |
| 6 | Amir Turgeman | Ironi Ashdod | 1992–1993 | 7 |

Note: Club(s) represents the permanent clubs during the player's time in the Under-21s. Those players in bold are still eligible to play for the team.

== See also ==
- UEFA European Under-21 Championship
- Israel national football team – senior men's squad
- Israel national under-23 football team – Olympic men's squad
- Israel national under-20 football team
- Israel national under-19 football team
- Israel national under-18 football team
- Israel national under-17 football team
- Israel national under-16 football team
