= Roman Begala =

Slovak footballer (born 1999)

Personal information
- Date of birth: 18 July 1999 (age 27)
- Place of birth: Vranov nad Topľou, Slovakia
- Height: 1.75 m (5 ft 9 in)
- Position: Midfielder

Team information
- Current team: Spartak Trnava
- Number: 5

Youth career
- 2007–2009: TJ Poľana Banské
- 2009–2014: Vranov nad Topľou
- 2014–2017: VSS Košice
- 2017: Senica
- 2018: Zemplín Michalovce

Senior career*
Years	Team	Apps	(Gls)
2016–2017	VSS Košice	3	(0)
2018–2021	Zemplín Michalovce	2	(0)
2019–2021	→ Slavoj Trebišov (loan)	52	(4)
2021–2023	Slavoj Trebišov	68	(13)
2024–2025	Petržalka	37	(7)
2025–2026	Tatran Prešov	31	(3)
2026–	Spartak Trnava	13	(0)
- * Club domestic league appearances and goals as of 21 November 2026

Roman Begala (born 18 July 1999) is a Slovak professional footballer who currently plays for Spartak Trnava in Slovak First League as a midfielder.

== Club career ==
=== Early career ===
He grew up in Banské near Vranov nad Topľou, and his very first club was TJ Poľana Banské. His other youth teams included MFK Vranov nad Topľou, VSS Košice, FK Senica and MFK Zemplín Michalovce. He also made his senior debut for VSS Košice, but the club then went bankrupt in 2017. After the stint in Senica, where he captained the youth team, he began training with Zemplín Michalovce's senior team in January 2018.

Begala made his Slovak Super Liga debut for Zemplín Michalovce against Slovan Bratislava on 27 July 2018. He replaced Stanislav Danko three minutes before the end of a 0–3 defeat.

=== Slavoj Trebišov ===
Later in the 2018–19 season, he joined Slavoj Trebišov. Here, he became captain and was ultimately the team's longest-serving player when he requested to have his contract terminated in 2023. Sportnet called him a "club icon" of Slavoj Trebišov. Following 127 matches across all competitions, he looked to join FC Petržalka. The team ended slightly above the middle in the 2024–25 2. Liga.

=== Tatran Prešov ===
As Begala's contract with Petržalka would expire in 2025, Czech media discussed transfer interest from Dynamo Ceske Budejovice as well as Tatran Prešov. Begala started training with Tatran Prešov, winners of the 2024–25 Second Liga and thus newly promoted to the first tier. The transfer was announced as official on 20 June 2025.

=== FC Spartak Trnava ===
On 2 June 2026, it was announced that Begala would be transferring to fellow league outfit FC Spartak Trnava, signing a 3 year contract.
