= Georgi Nikolov (footballer, born 2002) =

Bulgarian footballer (born 2002)

Personal information
- Full name: Georgi Nikolaev Nikolov
- Date of birth: 5 July 2002 (age 24)
- Place of birth: Vratsa, Bulgaria
- Height: 1.85 m (6 ft 1 in)
- Position: Forward

Team information
- Current team: Arda Kardzhali
- Number: 9

Youth career
- –2017: Levski Sofia
- 2017–2021: Ludogorets Razgrad

Senior career*
Years	Team	Apps	(Gls)
2020	Ludogorets Razgrad II	1	(0)
2021	Botev Vratsa	15	(0)
2022–2023	Sportist Svoge	34	(14)
2023–2024	Hebar	17	(8)
2024–2025	Botev Plovdiv	10	(4)
2025	Botev Plovdiv II	2	(0)
2025–	Arda Kardzhali	10	(2)

International career^{‡}
2021	Bulgaria U19	1	(0)
2023–2024	Bulgaria U21	10	(5)
- * Club domestic league appearances and goals as of 11 June 2026 ‡ National team caps and goals as of 13:14, 5 April 2024 (UTC)

Georgi Nikolaev Nikolov (Bulgarian: Георги Николаев Николов; born 5 July 2002) is a Bulgarian professional footballer who plays as a forward for First League club Arda Kardzhali.

== Career ==
Nikolov spent his youth years at the academy of Levski Sofia to 2017. Since January 2017, it has been part of the Ludogorets academy. In the summer of 2021, he moved to Botev Vratsa and recorded 15 matches in the top league, before moving to Sportist Svoge. On June 22, 2023, he signed with Hebar Pazardzhik. On 25 August 2023, Nikolov scored three goals in the 3:4 home defeat against table leaders Lokomotiv Plovdiv in a league match. On 18 January 2024 he completed his transfer to Botev Plovdiv for €200,000. On 7 April he received an injury in the league match against CSKA 1948 that turned out to be torn cruciate ligaments and meniscus and ruled him out until the end of the season. In June 2025, Nikolov signed a three-year contract with Arda Kardzhali.

== International career ==
In March 2023 Nikolov received his first call-up for the Bulgaria U21 team. On 21 November 2023, he scored three goals in the 6:0 home win over Estonia U21 in a 2025 UEFA Euro qualifier.

== Career statistics ==
=== Club ===
As of 11 June 2026

Club performance			League		Cup		Continental		Other		Total	
Club	League	Season	Apps	Goals	Apps	Goals	Apps	Goals	Apps	Goals	Apps	Goals
Ludogorets Razgrad II	Second League	2020–21	1	0	–		–		–		1	0
Botev Vratsa	First League	2021–22	15	0	1	0	–		–		16	0
Sportist Svoge	Second League	2021–22	12	8	0	0	–		–		12	8
Sportist Svoge	Second League	2022–23	20	6	1	0	–		1	0	22	6
Sportist Svoge	Total		32	14	1	0	0	0	1	0	34	14
Hebar	First League	2023–24	17	8	1	0	–		–		18	8
Botev Plovdiv	First League	2023–24	8	4	2	0	–		–		10	4
Botev Plovdiv	First League	2024–25	2	0	0	0	–		–		2	0
Botev Plovdiv	Total		10	4	2	0	0	0	0	0	12	4
Botev Plovdiv II	Second League	2024–25	2	0	–		–		–		2	0
Arda Kardzhali	First League	2025–26	10	2	0	0	6	0	–		16	2
Career statistics			88	28	5	0	6	0	1	0	100	28
