= Patrik Šimko =

Slovak footballer

Personal information
- Full name: Patrik Šimko
- Date of birth: 8 July 1991 (age 35)
- Place of birth: Czechoslovakia
- Height: 1.85 m (6 ft 1 in)
- Positions: Right back; left back

Team information
- Current team: Prešov
- Number: 4

Youth career
- ?–2011: Prešov
- 2010–2011: → Žilina (loan)

Senior career*
Years	Team	Apps	(Gls)
2010–2011	→ Žilina B (loan)	24	(0)
2010–2011	→ Žilina (loan)	3	(0)
2011–2013	HFK Olomouc	47	(2)
2013–2023	FC Slovácko	157	(1)
2023–	Prešov	73	(7)
- * Club domestic league appearances and goals as of 25 May 2026

Patrik Šimko (born 8 July 1991) is a Slovak professional footballer who plays for FC Tatran Prešov. He made his debut in Slovak 1. Liga for MŠK Žilina against MFK Košice on 2 October 2010.
