= Gabriel Barbosa (footballer, born 1999) =

Brazilian footballer

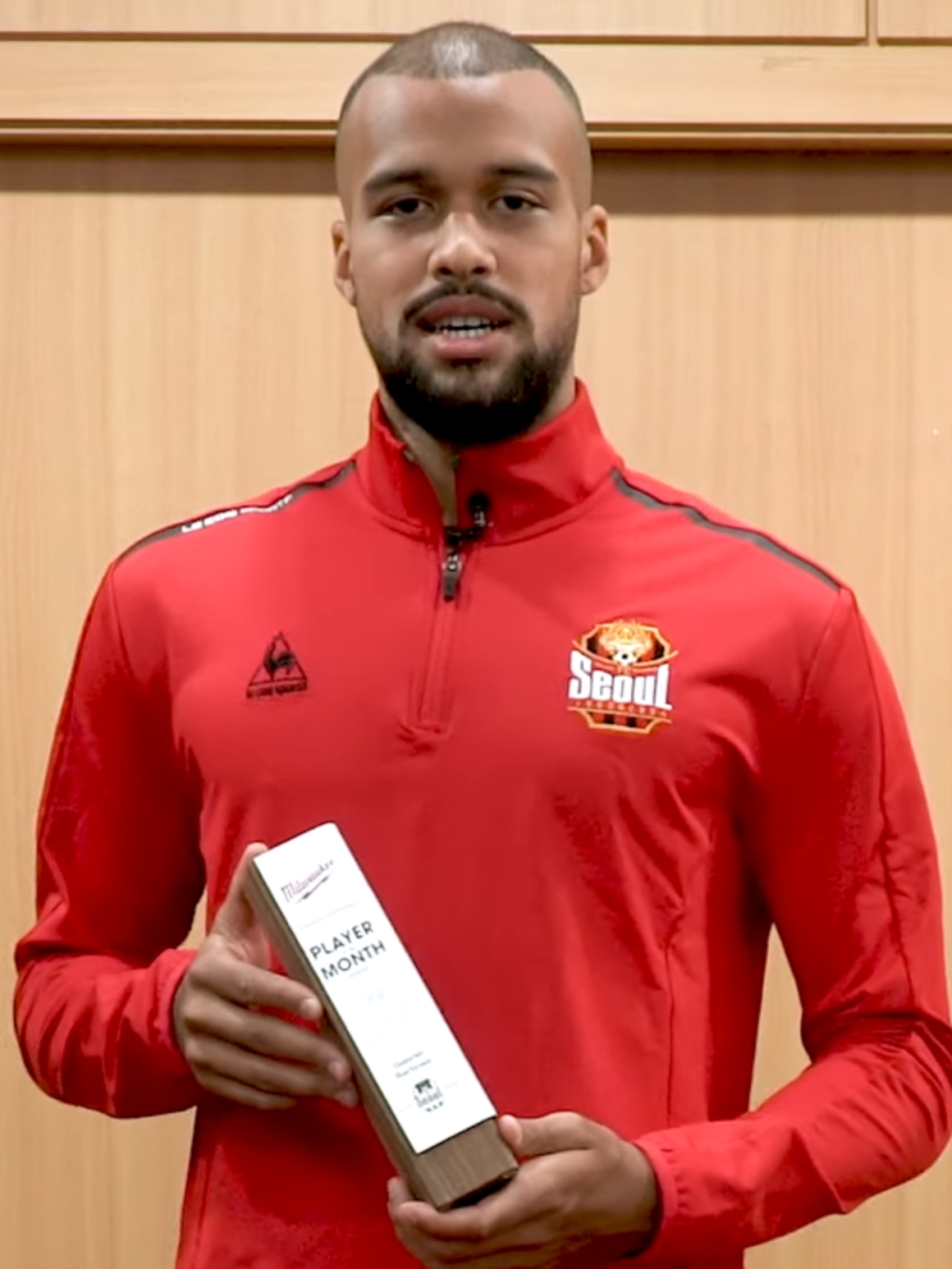
- Barbosa with FC Seoul in 2021

Personal information
- Full name: Gabriel Barbosa Avelino
- Date of birth: 17 March 1999 (age 27)
- Place of birth: Anápolis, Brazil
- Height: 1.95 m (6 ft 5 in)
- Position: Striker

Team information
- Current team: Farense

Youth career
- –2015: Desportivo Brasil
- 2015: → Shandong Luneng (loan)
- 2016–2020: Palmeiras
- 2017–2018: → S.P.A.L. (loan)

Senior career*
Years	Team	Apps	(Gls)
2020–2021	Palmeiras	0	(0)
2020	→ Londrina (loan)	3	(0)
2020–2021	→ Figueirense (loan)	7	(0)
2021	→ Paysandu (loan)	8	(5)
2021	→ FC Seoul (loan)	15	(2)
2022–2023	Levadiakos	12	(4)
2022–2023	→ Kukësi (loan)	29	(5)
2023–2025	Penafiel	49	(16)
2025–2026	Górnik Zabrze	3	(0)
2025	Górnik Zabrze II	1	(0)
2026	→ Tatran Prešov (loan)	11	(1)
2026–	Farense	0	(0)
- * Club domestic league appearances and goals as of 11:48, 17 May 2026 (UTC)

Gabriel Barbosa Avelino (born 17 March 1999), known as Gabriel Barbosa, is a Brazilian professional footballer who plays as a striker for Liga Portugal 2 club Farense.

== Career ==
In June 2021, Palmeiras sent Barbosa to FC Seoul on loan.

== Career statistics ==
As of match played 16 May 2026

Appearances and goals by club, season and competition
Club	Season	League			State league (Note: Includes Campeonato Paranaense, Campeonato Paraense)		National cup (Note: Includes Copa do Brasil, Albanian Cup, Taça de Portugal, Polish Cup, Slovak Cup)		Continental		Total	
Club	Season	Division	Apps	Goals	Apps	Goals	Apps	Goals	Apps	Goals	Apps	Goals
Palmeiras	2020	Série A	0	0	0	0	0	0	—		0	0
Londrina (loan)	2020	Série C	0	0	3	0	—		—		3	0
Figueirense (loan)	2020	Série B	7	0	—		—		—		7	0
Paysandu (loan)	2021	Série C	2	0	6	5	1	0	—		9	5
FC Seoul (loan)	2021	K League 1	15	2	—		—		—		15	2
Levadiakos	2021–22	Super League Greece 2	12	4	—		0	0	—		12	4
Kukesi (loan)	2022–23	Kategoria Superiore	29	5	—		5	2	—		34	7
Penafiel	2023–24	Liga Portugal 2	27	6	—		3	2	—		30	8
Penafiel	2024–25	Liga Portugal 2	22	10	—		1	0	—		23	10
Penafiel	Total		49	16	—		4	2	—		53	18
Górnik Zabrze	2025–26	Ekstraklasa	3	0	—		1	0	—		4	0
Górnik Zabrze II	2025–26	III liga, group III	1	0	—		—		—		1	0
Tatran Prešov (loan)	2025–26	Slovak First League	11	1	—		3	2	—		14	3
Career total			129	28	9	5	14	6	0	0	152	39

== Honours ==
Levadiakos

- Super League Greece 2: 2021–22
