= Landing Sagna =

Senegalese footballer

Personal information
- Date of birth: 22 December 1999 (age 26)
- Place of birth: Thiaroye, Senegal
- Height: 1.92 m (6 ft 4 in)
- Position: Forward

Team information
- Current team: Tatran Prešov
- Number: 80

Senior career*
Years	Team	Apps	(Gls)
−2021	AS Pikine		
2021−2022	Bourges	8	(2)
2021−2022	→ Bourges II	13	(7)
2022−2024	FC Košice	36	(15)
2024	→ Vysočina Jihlava (loan)	6	(0)
2024−	Tatran Prešov	49	(14)
- * Club domestic league appearances and goals as of 25 May 2026

Landing Sagna (born 22 December 1999) is a Senegalese professional footballer who plays as a forward for Tatran Prešov.

== Career ==
Sagna made his professional Niké Liga debut for FC Košice against ŠK Slovan Bratislava on 29 July 2023, in a home fixture at Košická futbalová aréna.
