= Jozef Menich =

Slovak footballer

Personal information
- Date of birth: 15 September 1994 (age 32)
- Place of birth: Banská Bystrica, Slovakia
- Height: 1.84 m (6 ft 0 in)
- Position: Centre-back

Team information
- Current team: FC Tatran Prešov
- Number: 31

Youth career
- 2006–2009: Fomat Martin
- 2009–2010: Dukla Banská Bystrica
- 2010: ŠK Badín
- 2011–2013: Dukla Banská Bystrica

Senior career*
Years	Team	Apps	(Gls)
2013–2014	Kremnička		
2014–2016	Lokomotíva Zvolen	57	(3)
2016–2018	Ružomberok	22	(0)
2018–2019	iClinic Sereď	25	(1)
2019–2020	Spartak Trnava	6	(0)
2020–2022	ViOn Zlaté Moravce	59	(3)
2022–2023	Partizani Tirana	23	(0)
2023-2024	Telavi	7	(1)
2024-	FC Tatran Prešov	38	(1)
- * Club domestic league appearances and goals as of 25 May 2026

Jozef Menich (born 15 September 1994) is a Slovak footballer who plays as a centre-back for FC Tatran Prešov.

== Club career ==
=== MFK Ružomberok ===
Menich made his Fortuna Liga debut for Ružomberok against Spartak Myjava on 6 August 2016.
