= Niv Yehoshua =

Israeli footballer (born 2005)

Niv Yehoshua ניב יהושע
Personal information
- Full name: Niv Yehoshua
- Date of birth: 28 January 2005 (age 21)
- Place of birth: Kiryat Ono, Israel
- Height: 1.80 m (5 ft 11 in)
- Position: Midfielder

Team information
- Current team: Hapoel Be'er Sheva
- Number: 28

Youth career
- 2012–2013: Hapoel Mahane Yehuda
- 2013–2017: Maccabi Tel Aviv
- 2017–2025: Maccabi Petah Tikva

Senior career*
Years	Team	Apps	(Gls)
2023–2026	Maccabi Petah Tikva	88	(6)
2026–	Hapoel Be'er Sheva	9	(2)

International career^{‡}
2019	Israel U16	3	(0)
2021–2022	Israel U17	11	(0)
2022	Israel U18	3	(0)
2023–2024	Israel U19	5	(0)
2024–	Israel U21	3	(1)
2026–	Israel	2	(0)
- * Club domestic league appearances and goals as of 19:25, 9 November 2026 (UTC) ‡ National team caps and goals as of 02:50, 18 November 2026 (UTC)

Niv Yehoshua (Hebrew: ניב יהושע; born 28 January 2005) is an Israeli professional footballer who plays as a midfielder for Israeli Premier League club Hapoel Be'er Sheva and the Israel national team.

== Club career ==
Yehoshua made his senior debut for Maccabi Petah Tikva on 3 January 2024, in an Israeli Premier League away match against Hapoel Jerusalem, that ended in a 1–3 loss.

Hapoel Be'er Sheva

On 15 June 2026, Yehoshua signed a five-year contract with Hapoel Be'er Sheva, with the club acquiring 50% of his economic rights for a transfer fee of €1.6 million.

== International career ==
He is a youth International for Israel, who plays for the under-19 national team since 2023.

On 5 November 2026, Yehoshua received his first call-up to the Israel national team by head coach Ran Ben Shimon for the UEFA Nations League matches against Kosovo national team and Austria national team.

== Career statistics ==
=== Club ===
As of 1 June 2024.

Club	Season	League			State Cup		Toto Cup		Continental		Other		Total	
Club	Season	Division	Apps	Goals	Apps	Goals	Apps	Goals	Apps	Goals	Apps	Goals	Apps	Goals
Maccabi Petah Tikva	2023–24	Israeli Premier League	20	0	0	0	0	0	–		0	0	20	0
Career total			20	2	0	0	0	0	0	0	0	0	20	0

== Honours ==
Maccabi Petah Tikva

- Israel State Cup: 2023–24

== See also ==
- List of Jewish footballers
- List of Jews in sports
- List of Israelis
