= Milot Avdyli =

Kosovar footballer (born 2002)

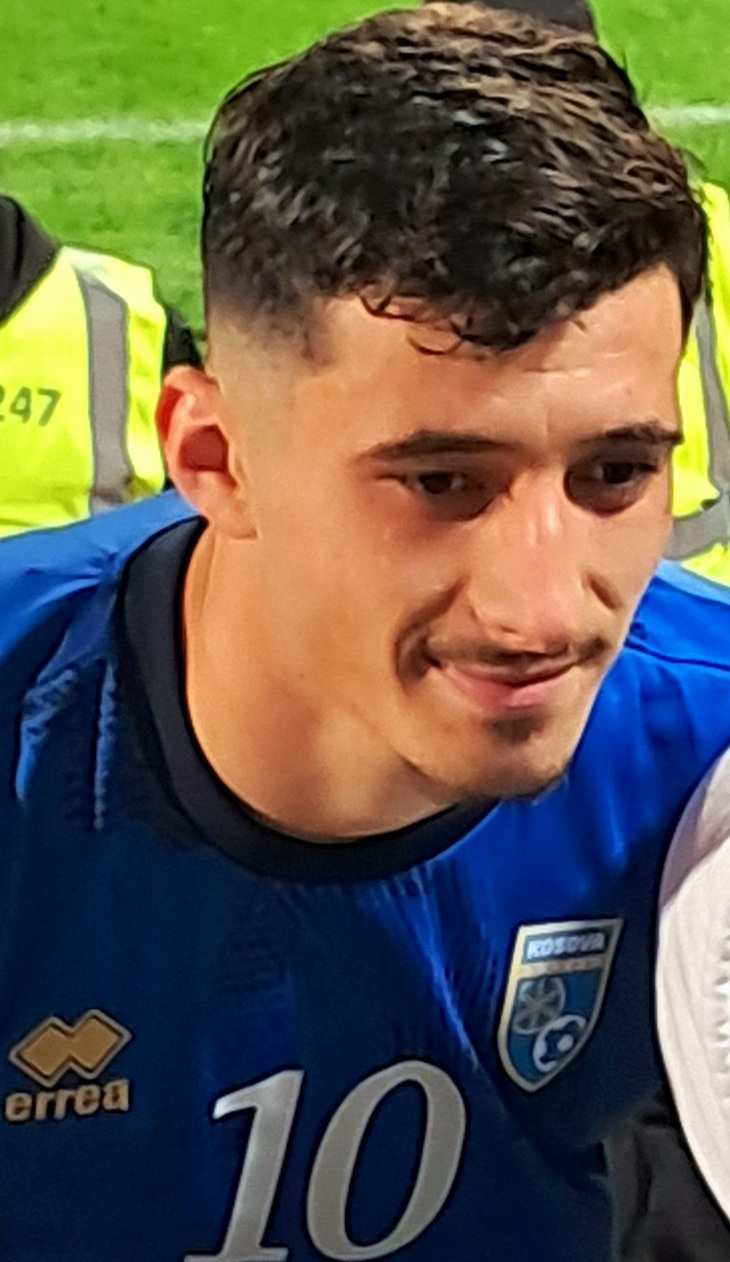
- Avdyli with Kosovo U21 in 2024

Personal information
- Date of birth: 28 July 2002 (age 24)
- Place of birth: Vushtrri, Kosovo under UN administration
- Height: 1.80 m (5 ft 11 in)
- Position: Winger

Team information
- Current team: NK Celje
- Number: 11

Youth career
- 2010–2015: El Clasico Football School
- 2015–2016: Vushtrria
- 2016–2020: Kurda

Senior career*
Years	Team	Apps	(Gls)
2020–2021	Trepça '89	16	(3)
2021–2025	Aarau	100	(6)
2025	Vorskla Poltava	10	(0)
2025–	Celje	35	(3)

International career^{‡}
2017	Kosovo U16	3	(0)
2018–2019	Kosovo U17	6	(1)
2020	Kosovo U19	1	(0)
2023–2024	Kosovo U21	10	(2)
2026–	Kosovo	2	(0)
- * Club domestic league appearances and goals as of 13 July 2025 ‡ National team caps and goals as of 20:06, 1 October 2026 (UTC)

Milot Avdyli (born 28 July 2002) is a Kosovar professional footballer who plays as a winger or wing-back for the Slovenian PrvaLiga club NK Celje and the Kosovo national team.

== Club career ==
=== Aarau ===
On 1 February 2021, Avdyli signed a two-year contract with Swiss Challenge League club Aarau and receiving squad number 20. After the transfer, he suffered an injury that kept him out for about two weeks. On 10 April 2021, Avdyli made his debut with Aarau, playing with the under-18 team in a match against Sion after being named in the starting line-up up and scored his team's third goal during a 3–1 home win. His debut with senior team came thirteen days later against Winterthur after coming on as a substitute at 71st minute in place of Kevin Spadanuda.

=== Vorskla Poltava ===
On 3 January 2025, Aarau announced the transfer of Avdyli to Ukrainian Premier League club Vorskla Poltava. Five days later, the club confirmed that he had joined on a two-year contract. His debut with Vorskla Poltava came on 23 February in a 0–1 away defeat against Obolon Kyiv after being named in the starting line-up.

== International career ==
From 2017, until 2024, Avdyli has been part of Kosovo at youth international level, respectively has been part of the U16, U17, U19 and U21 teams and he with these teams played twenty matches and scored three goals. In February 2020, Avdyli becomes part of the Kosovo U19 squad for the 2020 Roma Caput Mundi, with which he made his debut in the final match against Moldova after being named in the starting lineup, where he was declared champion.

== Career statistics ==
=== International ===
As of match played 1 October 2026

Appearances and goals by national team and year
National team	Year	Apps	Goals
Kosovo	2026	2	0
Total		2	0

== Honours ==
Celje

- Slovenian PrvaLiga: 2025–26

Kosovo U19

- Roma Caput Mundi: 2020
