= Andy Masaryk =

Slovak footballer (born 2005)

Personal information
- Full name: Andy Masaryk
- Date of birth: 7 April 2005 (age 21)
- Place of birth: Bratislava, Slovakia
- Position: Left winger

Team information
- Current team: KFC Komárno
- Number: 77

Youth career
- 2012–2022: Slovan Bratislava
- 2022–2023: Železiarne Podbrezová

Senior career*
Years	Team	Apps	(Gls)
2022–2024	Železiarne Podbrezová	14	(1)
2023	→ Pohronie	8	(1)
2024–2025	Pohronie	20	(6)
2025–2026	Železiarne Podbrezová	0	(0)
2025–2026	→ Tatran Prešov (loan)	28	(2)
2026–	KFC Komárno	8	(1)

International career^{‡}
2021–2022	Slovakia U17	6	(1)
2022–2023	Slovakia U18	3	(1)
2022–2023	Slovakia U19	10	(2)
- * Club domestic league appearances and goals as of 22 September 2026 ‡ National team caps and goals as of 13:17, 7 January 2024 (UTC)

Andy Masaryk (born 7 April 2005) is a Slovak footballer who plays for KFC Komárno as a left-winger.

== Club career ==
=== FK Železiarne Podbrezová ===
Masaryk made his Fortuna Liga debut for Železiarne Podbrezová in a home Horehronské derby against Dukla Banská Bystrica on 19 August 2022. Masaryk came on to replace Samuel Ďatko in the sixth minute of second half stoppage time with the final result sealed at 3–1 in favour of Železiari.

In 2023-24 season, he spent the autumn half on a loan in Žiar nad Hronom-based club FK Pohronie, being a regular in the club as well as U19 national team.
