= Breznica, Stropkov District =

Breznica
- Municipality
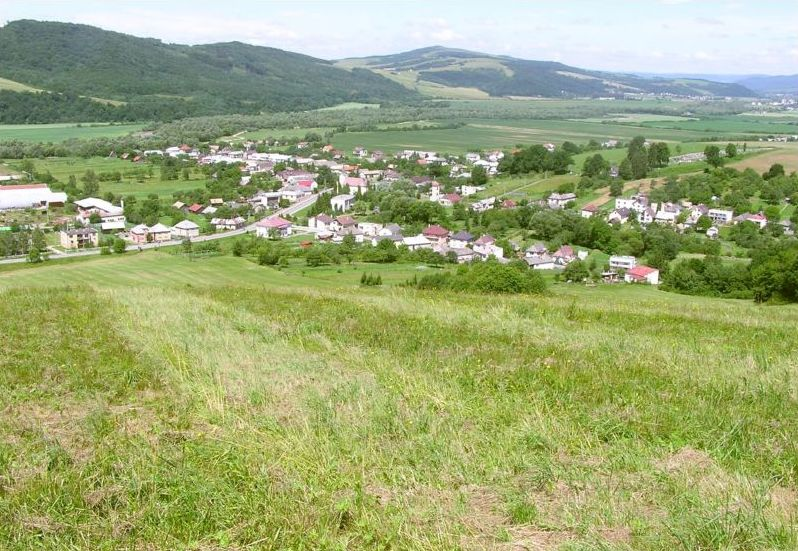

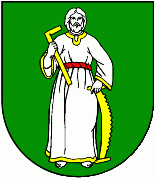
- Flag Coat of arms

- Location of Breznica in the Prešov Region Location of Breznica in Slovakia
- Coordinates: 49.17°N 21.67°E
- Country: Slovakia
- Region: Prešov Region
- District: Stropkov District
- First mentioned: 1404

Area
  - Total: 9.93 km^{2} (3.83 sq mi)
- Elevation: 176 m (577 ft)

Population (2025)
  - Total: 852
- Time zone: UTC+1 (CET)
  - Summer (DST): UTC+2 (CEST)
- Postal code: 910 1
- Area code: +421 54
- Vehicle registration plate (until 2022): SP
- Website: www.breznica.dcom.sk

Breznica (Hungarian: Nagyberezsnye) is a village and municipality in Stropkov District in the Prešov Region of north-eastern Slovakia.

== History ==
In historical records the village was first mentioned in 1404.

== Geography ==
The municipality lies at an altitude of 176 metres (577 ft) and covers an area of 9.93 km^{2} (3.83 sq mi) (2025).

== Population ==
Population statistic (10 years)
Year	1995	2005	2015	2025
Count	639	722	823	852
Difference		+12.98%	+13.98%	+3.52%

Population statistic
Year	2024	2025
Count	849	852
Difference		+0.35%

It has a population of 852 people (31 December 2025).

=== Ethnicity ===
Census 2021 (1+ %)
Ethnicity	Number	Fraction
Slovak	795	97.66%
Romani	64	7.86%
Rusyn	28	3.43%
Total	814	

In year 2021 was 814 people by ethnicity 795 as Slovak, 64 as Romani, 28 as Rusyn, 6 as Ukrainian, 5 as Czech, 5 as Not found out, 3 as English, 1 as Hungarian and 1 as Other.

Note on population: The difference values of population numbers in the table "Population statistic" and in the sections "Ethnicity" & "Religion" is caused by the use of various statistical methods.

=== Religion ===
Census 2021 (1+ %)
Religion	Number	Fraction
Roman Catholic Church	662	81.33%
Greek Catholic Church	96	11.79%
None	37	4.55%
Total	814	

In year 2021 was 814 people by religion 662 from Roman Catholic Church, 96 from Greek Catholic Church, 37 from None, 8 from Eastern Orthodox Church, 6 from Christian Congregations in Slovakia, 4 from Evangelical Church and 1 from New Apostolic Church.

== Genealogical resources ==
The records for genealogical research are available at the state archive "Statny Archiv in Presov, Slovakia"

- Roman Catholic church records (births/marriages/deaths): 1700-1897 (parish B)
- Greek Catholic church records (births/marriages/deaths): 1842-1919 (parish B)

== See also ==
- List of municipalities and towns in Slovakia
