= Stanislav Olejník =

Slovak footballer

Personal information
- Full name: Stanislav Olejník
- Date of birth: 31 March 2002 (age 24)
- Place of birth: Levoča, Slovakia
- Height: 1.78 m (5 ft 10 in)
- Position: Forward

Team information
- Current team: Tatran Prešov
- Number: 11

Youth career
- FK 05 Levoča
- 2010–2013: → Spišská Nová Ves (loan)
- 2014–2018: Tatran Prešov
- 2019–2020: Poprad

Senior career*
Years	Team	Apps	(Gls)
2019	Tatran Prešov	10	(2)
2019−2020	Poprad	4	(1)
2020−2023	Spartak Trnava	22	(1)
2022−2023	→ Spartak Myjava (loan)	22	(9)
2023−2024	Šamorín	19	(2)
2024−	Tatran Prešov	41	(9)

International career
- Slovakia U18
- Slovakia U19
- * Club domestic league appearances and goals as of 25 May 2026

Stanislav Olejník (born 31 March 2002) is a Slovak footballer who plays as a forward for Tatran Prešov.

== Club career ==
=== Spartak Trnava ===
Olejník made his professional Fortuna Liga debut for Spartak Trnava against Zemplín Michalovce on 8 August 2020.

== Honours ==
Spartak Trnava

- Slovnaft Cup: 2021–22
