= Nikola Iliev =

Bulgarian footballer

Personal information
- Full name: Nikola Iliyanov Iliev
- Date of birth: 6 June 2004 (age 22)
- Place of birth: Yudelnik, Bulgaria
- Height: 1.83 m (6 ft 0 in)
- Positions: Attacking midfielder; forward

Team information
- Current team: Septemvri Sofia (on loan from Botev Plovdiv)
- Number: 10

Youth career
- 2016–2020: Botev Plovdiv
- 2020–2023: Inter Milan

Senior career*
Years	Team	Apps	(Gls)
2019–2020	Botev Plovdiv	2	(0)
2022–2024	Inter Milan	0	(0)
2023–2024	→ CSKA 1948 II (loan)	1	(1)
2023–2024	→ CSKA 1948 (loan)	21	(1)
2024–2025	Botev Plovdiv II	1	(1)
2024–	Botev Plovdiv	57	(3)
2026–	→ Septemvri Sofia (loan)	0	(0)

International career^{‡}
2021–2023	Bulgaria U19	14	(3)
2023–2025	Bulgaria U21	19	(8)
2022–	Bulgaria	11	(0)
- * Club domestic league appearances and goals as of 21:42, 25 May 2026 (UTC) ‡ National team caps and goals as of 20:06, 1 June 2026 (UTC)

Nikola Iliyanov Iliev (Bulgarian: Никола Илиянов Илиев; born 6 June 2004) is a Bulgarian professional footballer who plays as an attacking midfielder and forward for First League club Septemvri Sofia, on loan from Botev Plovdiv, and the Bulgaria national team. He was included in The Guardian's "Next Generation" list for 2021.

== Club career ==
Born on the Yudelnik near Ruse, Iliev began football career at Botev Plovdiv. He made his professional debut for the team in a league match against Slavia Sofia on 29 September 2019. In June 2020, he completed his move to Inter Milan, signing a four-year contract.

On 31 May 2022, Iliev scored the winning goal for Inter U19 against Roma U19, making Inter Serie A Primavera champions.

On 26 October 2022, he scored all four goals in Inter's 4–2 win against Viktoria Plzeň in the UEFA Youth League.

On 5 February 2023, he was announced as Bulgarian Youth Footballer of 2022.

On 10 August 2023, Iliev joined CSKA 1948 on a one-year loan with an option to make the transfer permanent.

== International career ==
Iliev received his first call-up for the Bulgaria senior national team on 5 September 2022, for the UEFA Nations League games against Gibraltar and North Macedonia on 23 and 26 September 2022. He made his debut in the match against Gibraltar, won 5–1 by Bulgaria.

== Career statistics ==
=== Club ===
As of 29 July 2024

Club	Season	League			Cup		Continental		Other		Total	
Club	Season	Division	Apps	Goals	Apps	Goals	Apps	Goals	Apps	Goals	Apps	Goals
Botev Plovdiv	2019–20	First League	2	0	1 (Note: Appearances in the Bulgarian Cup)	0	0	0	0	0	3	0
Botev Plovdiv	2020–21	First League	0	0	0	0	0	0	0	0	0	0
CSKA 1948 (loan)	2023–24	First League	21	1	2	0	0	0	2	0	25	2
CSKA 1948 II (loan)	2023–24	Second League	1	1	0	0	0	0	0	0	1	1
Botev Plovdiv	2024–25	First League	2	1	0	0	2	1	0	0	4	2
Career total			26	3	3	0	2	1	2	0	33	5

=== International ===
As of 1 June 2026

Appearances and goals by national team and year
National team	Year	Apps	Goals
Bulgaria	2022	4	0
Bulgaria	2023	4	0
Bulgaria	2026	3	0
Bulgaria	Total	11	0

== Honours ==
Individual

- Bulgarian Youth Footballer of the Year: 2022
