= Banské =

- Municipality
- Flag

- Location of Banské in the Prešov Region Location of Banské in Slovakia
- Coordinates: 48.83°N 21.58°E
- Country: Slovakia
- Region: Prešov Region
- District: Vranov nad Topľou District
- First mentioned: 1397

Area
  - Total: 29.86 km^{2} (11.53 sq mi)
- Elevation: 327 m (1,073 ft)

Population (2025)
  - Total: 2,053
- Time zone: UTC+1 (CET)
  - Summer (DST): UTC+2 (CEST)
- Postal code: 941 2
- Area code: +421 57
- Vehicle registration plate (until 2022): VT
- Website: www.obecbanske.sk

Banské (Hungarian: Bányapataka, until 1899: Bánszka; Rusyn: Баньске) is a village and municipality in Vranov nad Topľou District in the Prešov Region of eastern Slovakia. In historical records the village was first mentioned in 1397. The municipality lies at an altitude of 325 metres and covers an area of 29.861 km².

== Geography ==
The municipality lies at an altitude of 327 metres (1,073 ft) and covers an area of 29.86 km^{2} (11.53 sq mi) (2025).

== Population ==
Population statistic (10 years)
Year	1995	2005	2015	2025
Count	1359	1580	1823	2053
Difference		+16.26%	+15.37%	+12.61%

Population statistic
Year	2024	2025
Count	2018	2053
Difference		+1.73%

It has a population of 2053 people (31 December 2025).

=== Ethnicity ===
Census 2021 (1+ %)
Ethnicity	Number	Fraction
Slovak	1535	80.53%
Romani	349	18.31%
Not found out	72	3.77%
Total	1906	

In year 2021 was 1906 people by ethnicity 1535 as Slovak, 349 as Romani, 72 as Not found out, 16 as Rusyn, 5 as Czech, 4 as Ukrainian and 1 as Hungarian.

Note on population: The difference values of population numbers in the table "Population statistic" and in the sections "Ethnicity" & "Religion" is caused by the use of various statistical methods.

=== Religion ===
Census 2021 (1+ %)
Religion	Number	Fraction
Greek Catholic Church	1604	84.16%
Roman Catholic Church	143	7.5%
None	84	4.41%
Not found out	58	3.04%
Total	1906	

In year 2021 was 1906 people by religion 1604 from Greek Catholic Church, 143 from Roman Catholic Church, 84 from None, 58 from Not found out, 6 from Jehovah's Witnesses, 3 from Evangelical Church, 2 from Eastern Orthodox Church, 2 from Other and not ascertained christian church, 1 from Calvinist Church, 1 from New Apostolic Church, 1 from Seventh-day Adventist Church and 1 from Baptists Church.

== See also ==
- List of municipalities and towns in Slovakia

== Genealogical resources ==
The records for genealogical research are available at the state archive in Prešov (Slovak: Štátny archív v Prešove).

- Roman Catholic church records (births/marriages/deaths): 1770-1895 (parish B)
- Greek Catholic church records (births/marriages/deaths): 1817-1934 (parish A)
