= Hélder Morim =

Portuguese footballer

Personal information
- Full name: Hélder Gomes Morim
- Date of birth: 14 May 2001 (age 25)
- Place of birth: Póvoa de Varzim, Portugal
- Height: 1.81 m (5 ft 11 in)
- Position: Midfielder

Team information
- Current team: Tatran Prešov
- Number: 70

Youth career
- 2009–2015: Rio Ave
- 2015–2020: Leixões

Senior career*
Years	Team	Apps	(Gls)
2021–2022	Leixões	32	(1)
2022–2025	Chaves	35	(1)
2023	→ Trofense (loan)	16	(0)
2025–	Tatran Prešov	20	(1)
- * Club domestic league appearances and goals as of 25 May 2026

Hélder Gomes Morim (born 14 May 2001) is a Portuguese professional footballer who plays as a midfielder for FC Tatran Prešov.

== Professional career ==
Gomes is a youth product of the academies of Rio Ave and Leixões, and began his senior career with Leixões in 2021 in the Liga Portugal 2. On 29 July 2022, he transferred to the Primeira Liga club Chaves.

== Playing style ==
Morim is a consistent left-footed midfielder who is appreciated for his build-up play long pass. He has good speed and a slight build. He originally played as a left-back, before transitioning to midfield.
