= Miłosz Matysik =

Polish footballer

Personal information
- Date of birth: 26 April 2004 (age 22)
- Place of birth: Białystok, Poland
- Height: 1.90 m (6 ft 3 in)
- Positions: Centre-back; defensive midfielder

Team information
- Current team: Aris Limassol
- Number: 17

Youth career
- –2020: Jagiellonia Białystok

Senior career*
Years	Team	Apps	(Gls)
2020–2023	Jagiellonia Białystok II	9	(1)
2021–2023	Jagiellonia Białystok	37	(1)
2024–	Aris Limassol	39	(2)
2026	→ Bruk-Bet Termalica (loan)	11	(0)

International career^{‡}
2022	Poland U18	1	(0)
2022–2023	Poland U19	10	(0)
2023–	Poland U21	18	(2)
- * Club domestic league appearances and goals as of 14:17, 10 November 2026 (UTC) ‡ National team caps and goals as of 21:24, 19 November 2026 (UTC)

Miłosz Matysik (born 26 April 2004) is a Polish professional footballer who plays as a centre-back or defensive midfielder for Cypriot First Division club Aris Limassol.

== Club career ==
Matysik is the youth product of Jagiellonia's academy. He made his debut for Jagiellonia Białystok II on 7 November 2020, in a 2–1 victory over Pogoń Grodzisk Mazowiecki. Three months later, on 7 February 2021, he made his debut in Ekstraklasa in a 2–0 loss over Wisła Kraków. Matysik scored his first goal for Jagiellonia's reserve team on 27 February, during a walkover victory over Ruch Wysokie Mazowieckie, which ended as a 1–1 draw. On 4 March 2022, he scored his premiere goal in Ekstraklasa in the 48th minute of a 1–1 draw against Stal Mielec.

== Career statistics ==
As of match played 8 November 2026

Appearances and goals by club, season and competition
Club	Season	League			National cup (Note: Includes Polish Cup, Cypriot Cup)		Europe		Other		Total	
Club	Season	Division	Apps	Goals	Apps	Goals	Apps	Goals	Apps	Goals	Apps	Goals
Jagiellonia Białystok II	2020–21	III liga, group I	6	1	—		—		—		6	1
Jagiellonia Białystok II	2022–23	III liga, group I	2	0	—		—		—		2	0
Jagiellonia Białystok II	2023–24	III liga, group I	1	0	—		—		—		1	0
Jagiellonia Białystok II	Total		9	1	—		—		—		9	1
Jagiellonia Białystok	2020–21	Ekstraklasa	1	0	0	0	—		—		1	0
Jagiellonia Białystok	2021–22	Ekstraklasa	13	1	0	0	—		—		13	1
Jagiellonia Białystok	2022–23	Ekstraklasa	15	0	1	0	—		—		16	0
Jagiellonia Białystok	2023–24	Ekstraklasa	8	0	2	0	—		—		10	0
Jagiellonia Białystok	Total		37	1	3	0	—		—		40	1
Aris Limassol	2023–24	Cypriot First Division	10	0	4	0	—		—		14	0
Aris Limassol	2024–25	Cypriot First Division	17	0	2	0	—		—		19	0
Aris Limassol	2025–26	Cypriot First Division	4	0	1	0	0	0	—		5	0
Aris Limassol	2026–27	Cypriot First Division	8	2	0	0	—		—		8	2
Aris Limassol	Total		39	2	7	0	0	0	—		46	2
Bruk-Bet Termalica (loan)	2025–26	Ekstraklasa	11	0	—		—		—		11	0
Career total			96	4	10	0	0	0	0	0	106	4
