= Michal Sipľak =

Slovak footballer

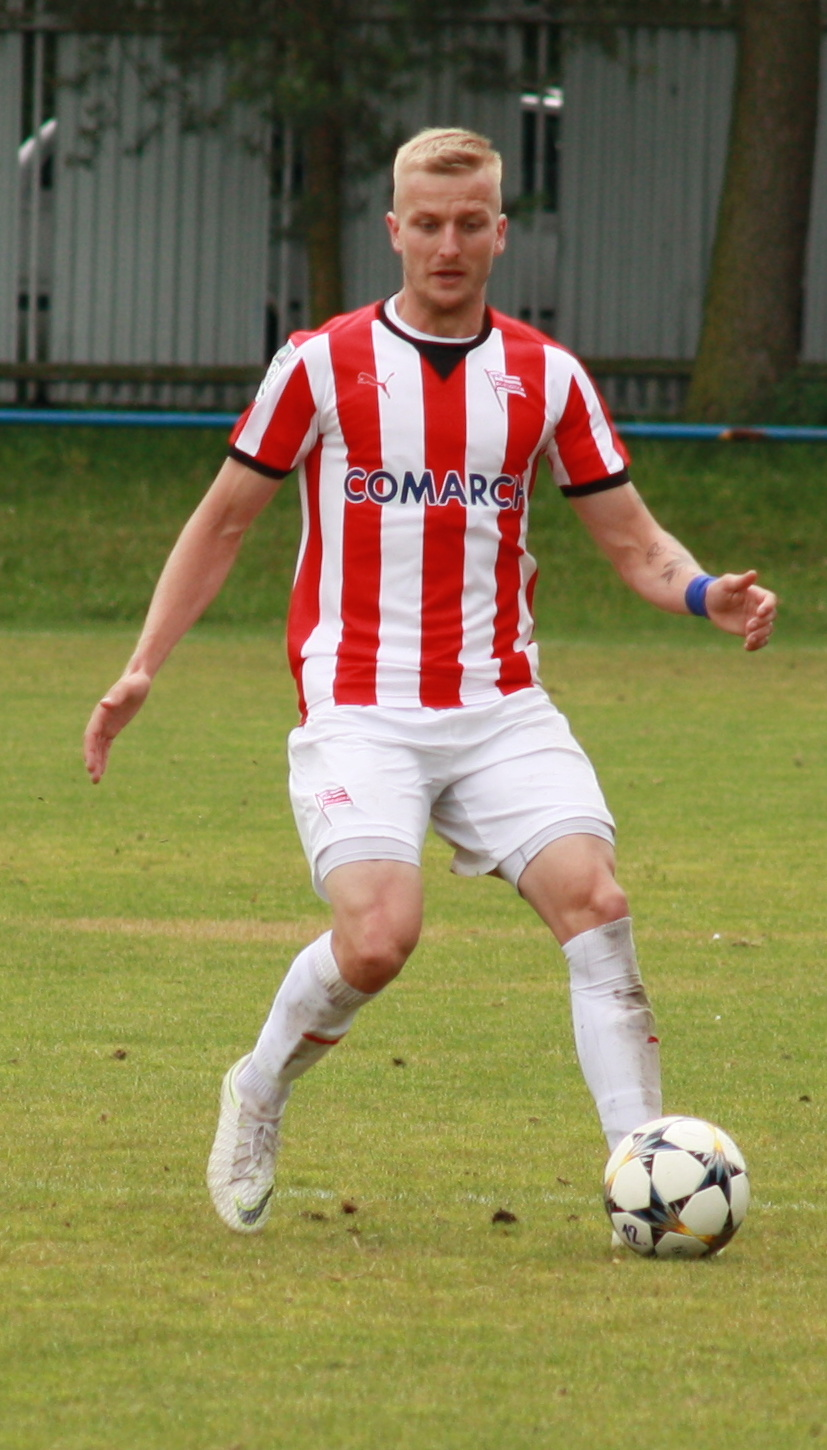
- Sipľak playing for Cracovia

Personal information
- Full name: Michal Sipľak
- Date of birth: 2 February 1996 (age 30)
- Place of birth: Bardejov, Slovakia
- Height: 1.84 m (6 ft 0 in)
- Position: Left-back

Team information
- Current team: Tatran Prešov
- Number: 3

Youth career
- Partizán Bardejov
- → Slovan Bratislava (loan)

Senior career*
Years	Team	Apps	(Gls)
2015–2016	Partizán Bardejov	22	(0)
2014–2015	→ Slovan Bratislava (loan)	2	(0)
2014–2015	→ Slovan Bratislava B (loan)	20	(0)
2016–2017	Zemplín Michalovce	28	(0)
2017–2023	Cracovia	126	(5)
2019–2023	Cracovia II	6	(1)
2023–2024	Górnik Zabrze	13	(1)
2024–2025	Puszcza Niepołomice	17	(0)
2025–	Tatran Prešov	27	(1)

International career
- Slovakia U16
- Slovakia U17
- Slovakia U18
2017–2018	Slovakia U21	10	(2)
- * Club domestic league appearances and goals as of 11:49, 17 May 2026 (UTC)

Michal Sipľak (born 2 February 1996) is a Slovak professional footballer who plays as a left-back for Slovak club Tatran Prešov.

== Club career ==
=== Slovan Bratislava ===
Sipľak made his Corgoň Liga debut for Slovan Bratislava on 31 May 2014, entering in as a substitute in place of Róbert Matejka against Spartak Trnava.

=== Cracovia ===
On 7 July 2017, he signed a contract with Cracovia.

=== Górnik Zabrze ===
On 30 June 2023, Sipľak joined Górnik Zabrze on a two-year deal. After spending most of the 2023–24 season as a back-up to first-choice left-back Erik Janža, Sipľak left the club by mutual consent on 18 June 2024.

=== Puszcza Niepołomice ===
Sipľak remained in the Polish top-flight after signing a two-year deal, with a one-year option, with Puszcza Niepołomice on 21 June 2024.

== International career ==
Sipľak spent some of his under-21 international career under Pavel Hapal. The same coach surprisingly nominated him to senior national team on 12 March 2019, for a double UEFA Euro 2020 qualifying against Hungary and Wales. He was nominated to replace the long-term international left-back and recently retired Tomáš Hubočan.

== Honours ==
Slovan Bratislava

- Slovak Superliga: 2013–14

Cracovia

- Polish Cup: 2019–20

Cracovia II

- IV liga Lesser Poland West: 2019–20
