= Bleron Krasniqi =

Kosovan footballer (born 2002)

Personal information
- Date of birth: 18 September 2002 (age 24)
- Place of birth: Ferizaj, Kosovo under UN administration
- Height: 1.78 m (5 ft 10 in)
- Position: Forward

Team information
- Current team: Kapfenberger SV
- Number: 10

Youth career
- 2007–2011: SC Tornado Westig
- 2011–2015: FC Iserlohn
- 2015–2021: Schalke 04

Senior career*
| Years | Team | Apps | (Gls) |
| 2020–2024 | Schalke 04 II | 40 | (6) |
| 2021 | Schalke 04 | 1 | (0) |
| 2022–2023 | → Berliner AK (loan) | 28 | (4) |
| 2024–2025 | Kapfenberger SV | 21 | (2) |
| 2025 | Tatran Prešov | 8 | (0) |
| 2026- | Kapfenberger SV | 8 | (3) |
- * Club domestic league appearances and goals as of 17 May 2026

Bleron Krasniqi (born 18 September 2002) is a Kosovan footballer who plays as a forward for Kapfenberger SV.

== Club career ==
=== Schalke 04 ===
On 6 December 2020, Krasniqi made his debut with Schalke 04 II in a 0–1 away win against Fortuna Düsseldorf II after coming on as a substitute at 72nd minute in place of Luca Schuler.

On 23 July 2021, he was called up and made his debut with first team after coming on as a substitute at 73rd minute in place of Dominick Drexler in the league match against Hamburger SV at home, becoming the third ever Kosovan to make it to club's first team.
