= 2025–26 FC Spartak Trnava season =

103rd season of FC Spartak Trnava

FC Spartak Trnava
2025–2026 season
- President: Peter Macho
- Manager: 2025 Michal Ščasný; 2025 Martin Škrtel (Interim); 2026– Antonio Muñoz
- Stadium: Anton Malatinský Stadium
- Slovak First Football League: 3rd (35 points)
- Europa League: First qualifying round
- Conference League: Third qualifying round
- Top goalscorer: League: Abdulrahman Taiwo (6); All: Roman Procházka (6)
- Highest home attendance: 17,011 v Slovan Bratislava (18 Oct 2025, Slovak First Football League)
- Lowest home attendance: 4,273 v MFK Ružomberok (27 Jul 2025, Slovak first league)
Home colours	Away colours

The 2025–26 season is the 103rd season in the history of FC Spartak Trnava, and the club's 23rd consecutive season in Slovak First Football League. In addition to the domestic league, the club is participating in the Slovak Cup and the UEFA Europa League qualifications.

== Season ==
=== June 2025 ===
On 6 June 2025, Michal Ščasný became the new manager of Spartak Trnava, coming in place of Michal Gašparík, who joined Polish side Górnik Zabrze for a fee of €75,000.

=== July 2025 ===
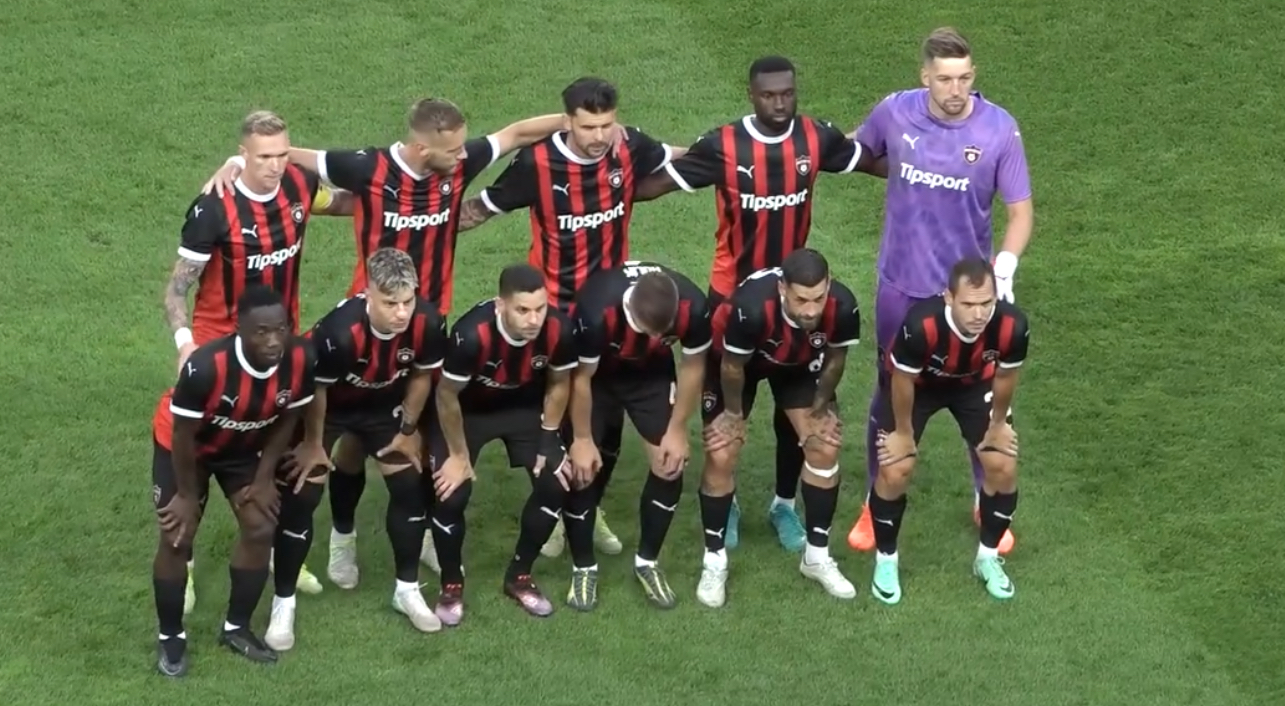
Spartak players before the first leg against BK Häcken.

In the club's first game of the season, they lost 1–0 at home against BK Häcken in the 1st round of qualifications to the Europa League. Spartak drew the second leg after a late goal from John Paul Dembe in the 96” minute. The game also saw the club first goal of the season, a direct free-kick scored by their captain Roman Procházka. Debutant Giorgi Moistsrapishvili was also able to put his name on the goal sheet.

The first win of the season came in a Conference League qualification match against Hibernians F.C, with the final score line being 2–1 after Libor Holík volleyed the ball from a cross by Martin Mikovič and Roman Procházka successfully converting a penalty won after a foul of Timotej Kudlička.

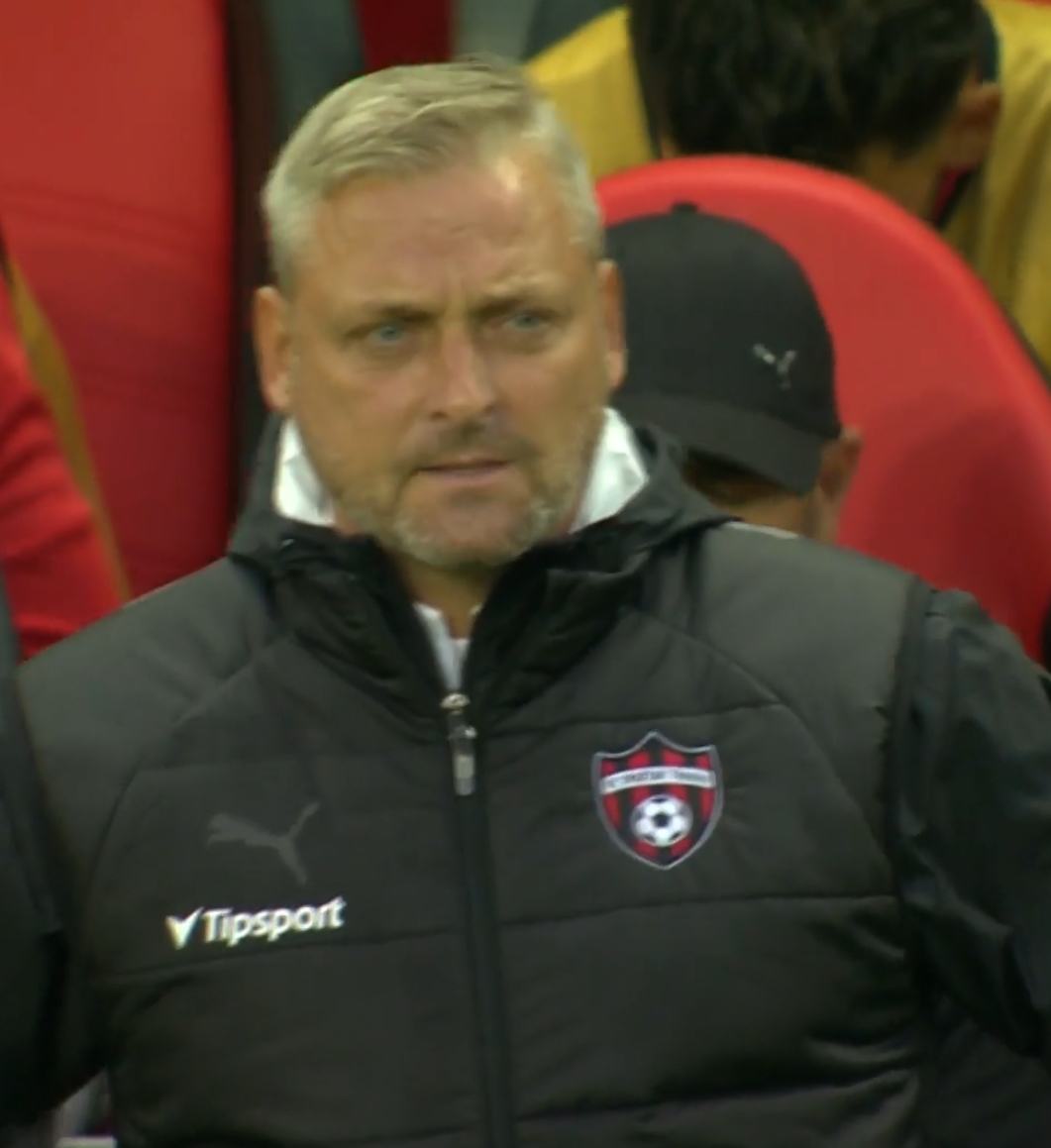
Michal Ščasný at halftime against Ružomberok.

Spartak's first league game was against MFK Ružomberok on 27 July 2025. Jakub Paur opened the score with a volley after a misjudgment from the Ružomberok defense. Philip Azango was able to put the goal in the back of the net after a pass from Giorgi Moistsrapishvili. The 3rd and final goal was scored by Roman Procházka from outside of the penalty box. The game also saw a direct red card given to David Huf after a foul on Kristián Koštrna.

In the second leg against Hibernians, Spartak won with a convincing score line of 5–1. The first goal was scored by Libor Holík in the 4” minute of the game after a cross by Martin Mikovič. The second goal was scored 3 minutes later, after a 50 meter dribble by Philip Azango, the ball was found by Holík who passed it to a completely open Stefan Skrbo. A penalty was given away in the 15” minute by Koštrna which was saved by Žiga Frelih. In the 30” minute another penalty was given away, this time after a handball by Hibernians defender, however the penalty wasn't converted by Michal Ďuriš. In the second half goals by Philip Azango and Michal Tomič would seal the win for Spartak. After the game it was also announced that Vojtěch Kubista and Milan Corryn would be leaving the club following the termination of their contracts.

The top goal scorer for Spartak in the July part of the season was Roman Procházka, with 3 goals in 5 games in all competitions.

=== August 2025 ===
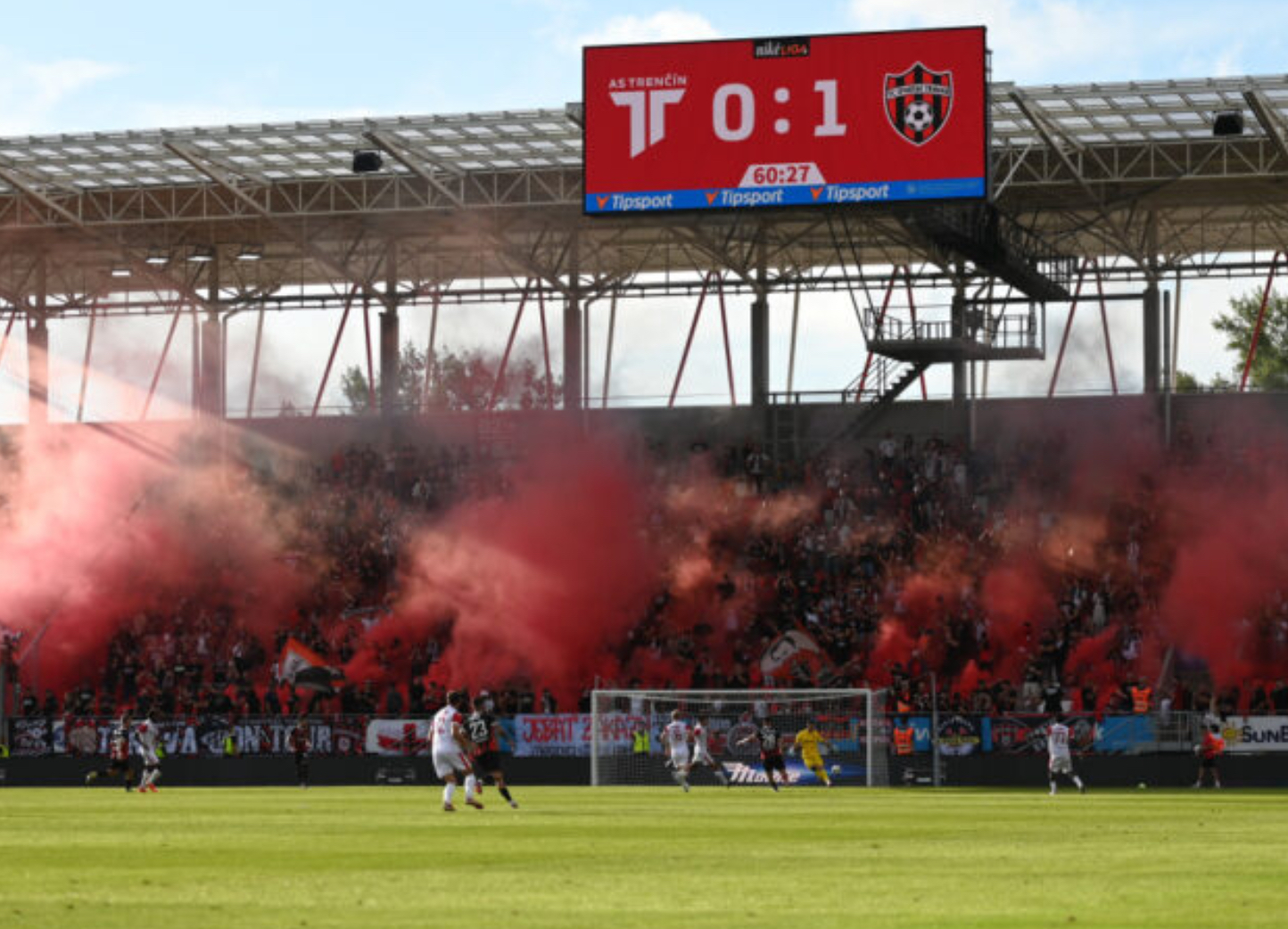
More than 1,300 Spartak fans.

The club started August with a 1–0 league win against AS Trenčín. Erik Daniel was able to put his name on the goal sheet after a well taken corner. The game also saw red cards for Suleman Sani, Roko Jureškin and Kristián Koštrna. By the second round, Spartak were the only team to have won both games.

There were more than 1,300 away fans that came to the Štadión Sihoť.

The next game was a 3–0 away loss against CS Universitatea Craiova.

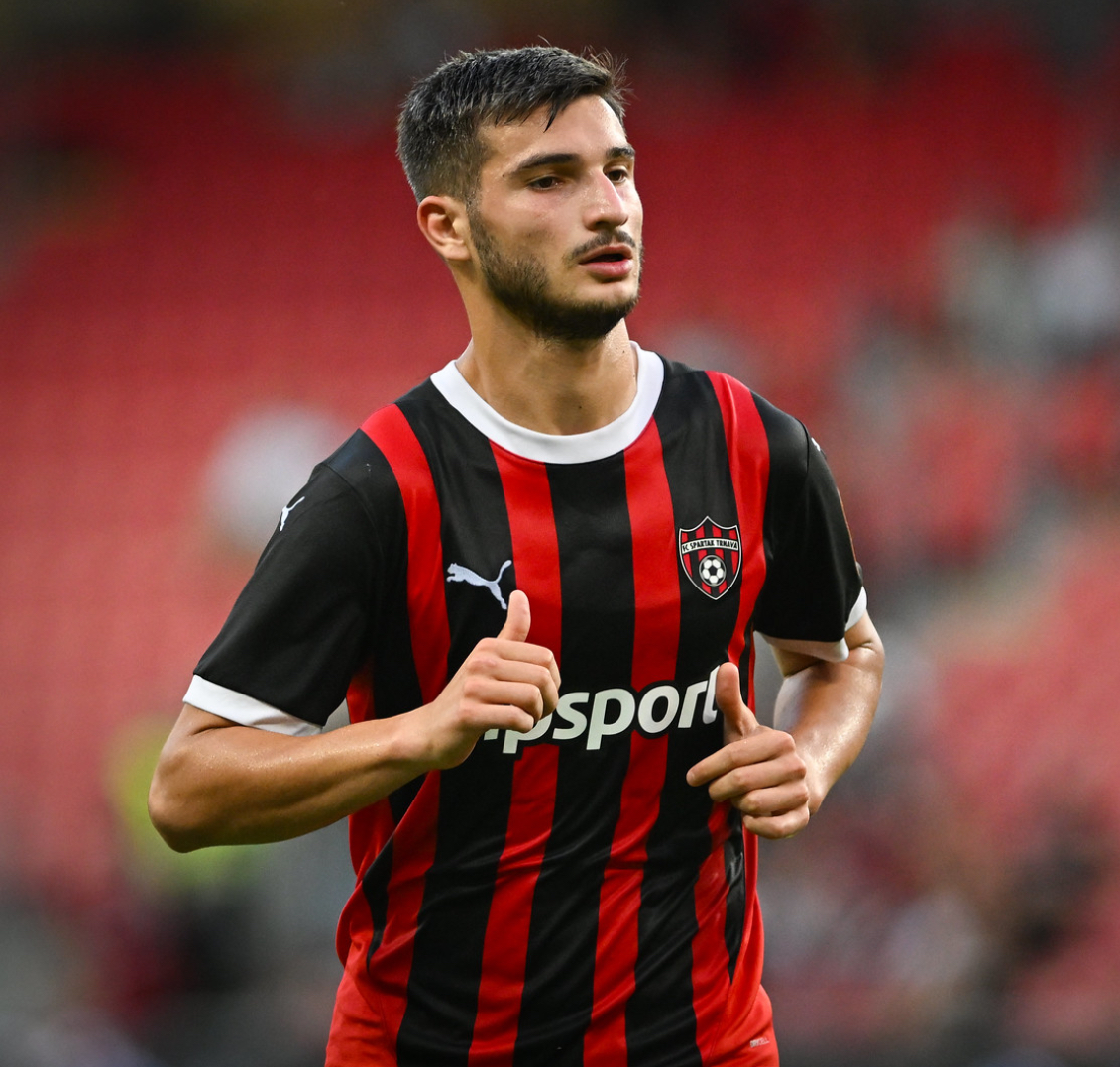
Giorgi Moistsrapishvili.

Spartak were able to continue their good league form with a 1–0 win at home against new comers Tatran Presov. After a cross by Miloš Kratochvíl, the ball found the head of Libor Holík who was able score his third goal of the season. In the 45th minute Patrick Nwadike scored a bicycle kick after a corner by Giorgi Moistsrapishvili, however the goal didn't count due to a foul in the build up to the goal. Landing Sagna equalized the game but after being checked by VAR, the goal was disallowed. It was also the club's 1,000th Slovak league game in its history.

In the second leg against Craovia, Spartak were able to win the game 4–3 after extra time. After a goal scored by Miloš Kratochvíl, the score was set at 1–1 at half-time. After being subbed on in the 61st minute, Giorgi Moistsrapishvili was able to provide 3 assists in the next 20 minutes for Patrick Nwadike, Philip Azango and Timotej Kudlička. The game was set a 4–1 to the Slovak club at full time. Despite winning the game, Spartak would be knocked out 6–4 on aggregate.

They became the first Slovak club to overcome a 3–0 score in a European competition.

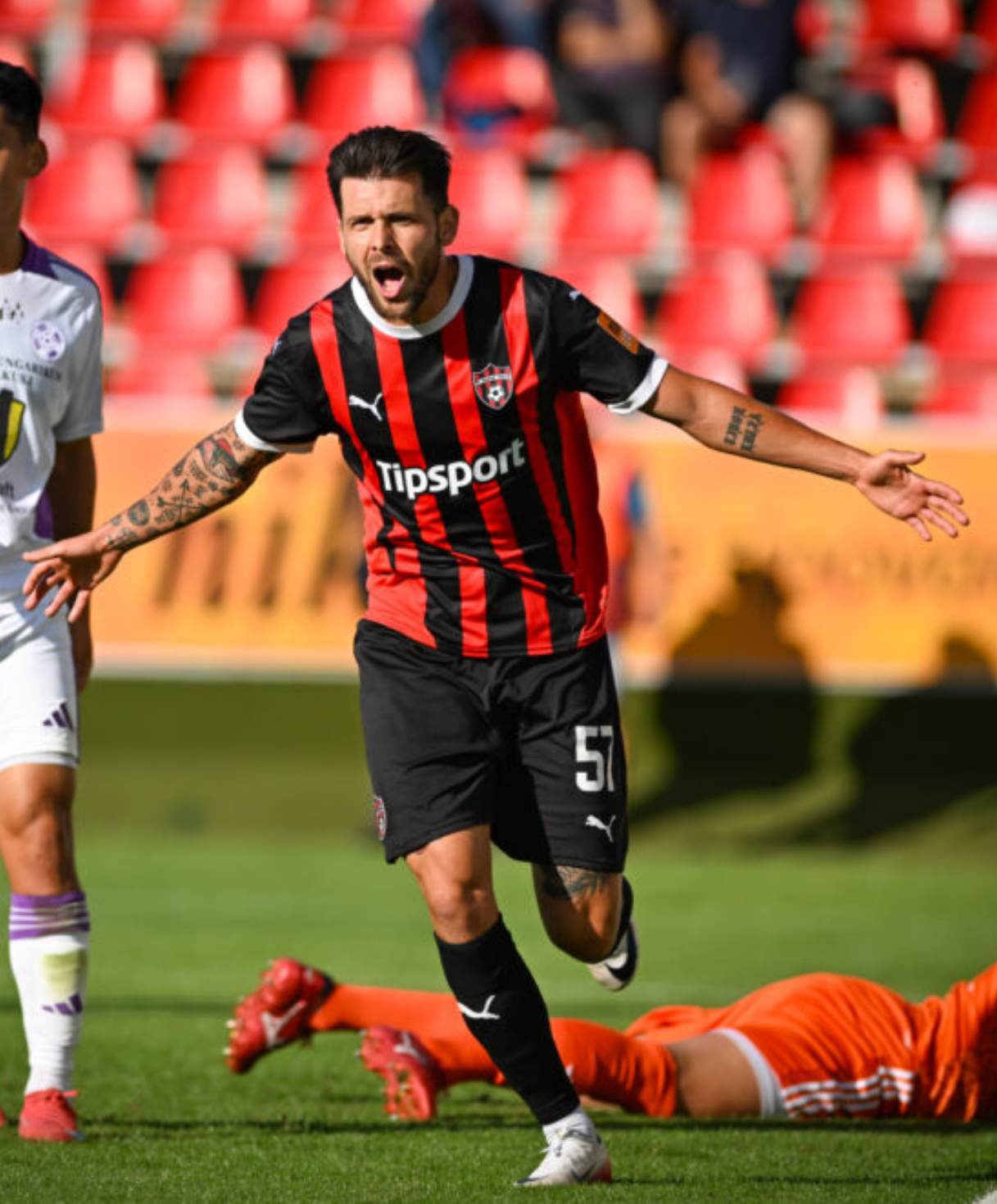
Ďuriš celebrating his goal.

In the next league match, Spartak were able to continue their positive form with a 4–1 away win over KFC Komárno. In the first half, Michal Ďuriš was able to end his goal drought by scoring a header after a cross by captain Martin Mikovič. A double scored by Stefan Skrbo would end the half 3–0 in his team's favor. A penalty scored by Roman Procházka would finish the game. Once again, there was a large amount of Spartak fans attending the game, 2,800.

Shortly after the game it was announced by the club that Erik Daniel would be leaving the club.

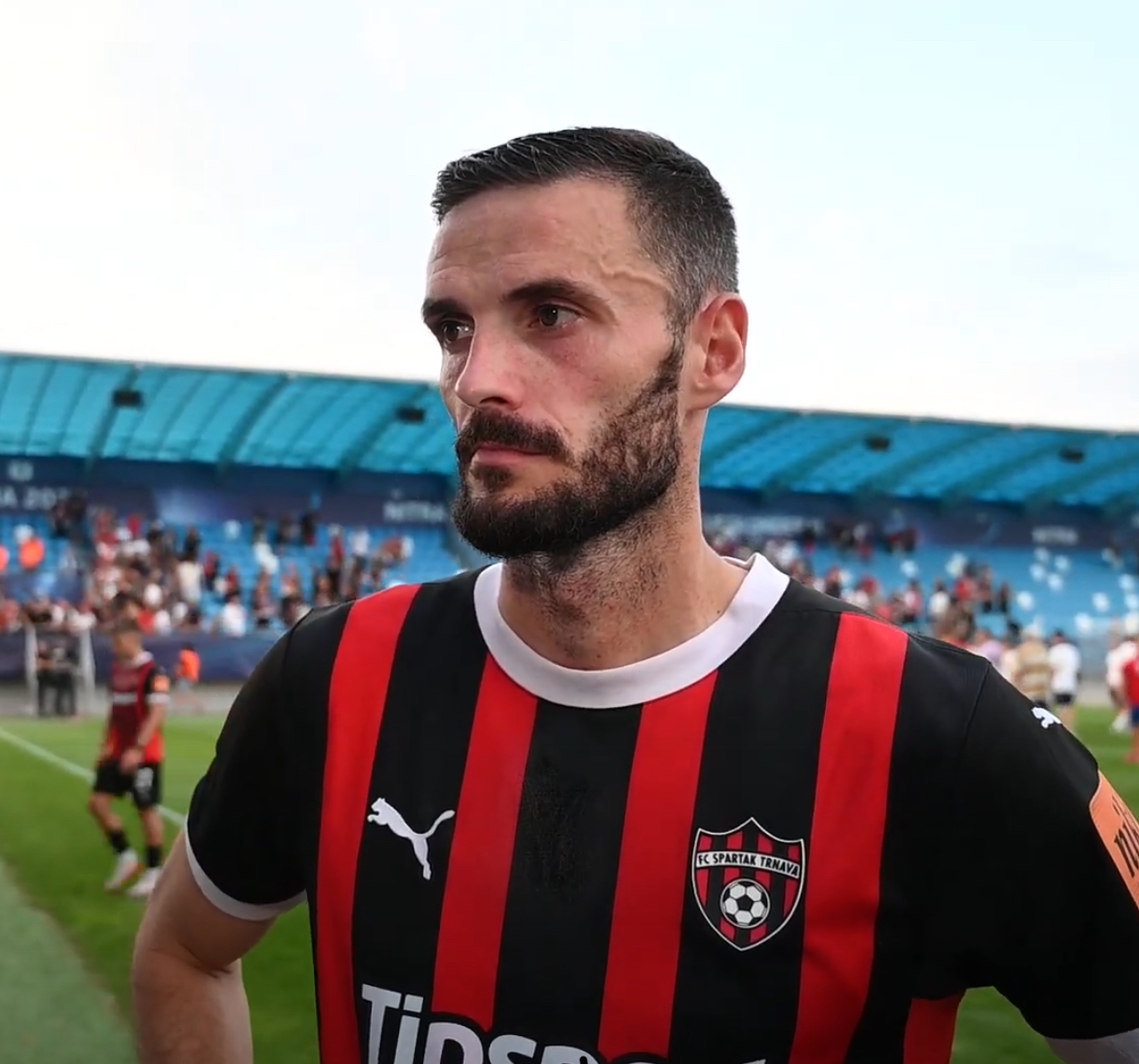
Sabo in a post-match interview.

Spartak would start the Slovak Cup with a 4–1 win over 5. Liga club AC Nitra. Timotej Kudlička managed to score a goal when he beat Nitra's goalkeeper with a low shot to the post. A minute later, Erik Sabo was close to finishing, but was fouled in the penalty area. The same player put the ball on the white spot and converted the awarded penalty – 2–0 for Spartak. Spartak managed to increase the score by half-time when Hilary Gong scored his first goal in the Trnava jersey after a nice move and pass from Kudlička. The score went into the locker room with the score 3–0 for the guests. From the last action of the match, Škrbo got to the finish in front of the goalkeeper after a quick break and adjusted the score to 4–1 for Spartak.

=== September 2025 ===
On 6 September 2025, it was announced that Georgian midfielder Luka Khorkheli would be joining the club. An hour later, it was announced that Abdulrahman Taiwo would be returning to Spartak, joining on a loan with a buy option.

After the international break, Spartak would be traveling to Skalica for an away game against MFK Skalica. Goals from Azango, Taiwo, Procházka and Ďuriš sealed a 4–0 win.

=== November 2025 ===
After a string of poor performances, it was announced that Michal Ščasný would be parting ways with the club. Current sporting director Martin Škrtel was shortly announced as the new interim manager. Škrtel would lead Spartak to wins against Košice (2–1) and Komárno (2–0) in the month of November.

=== December 2025 ===
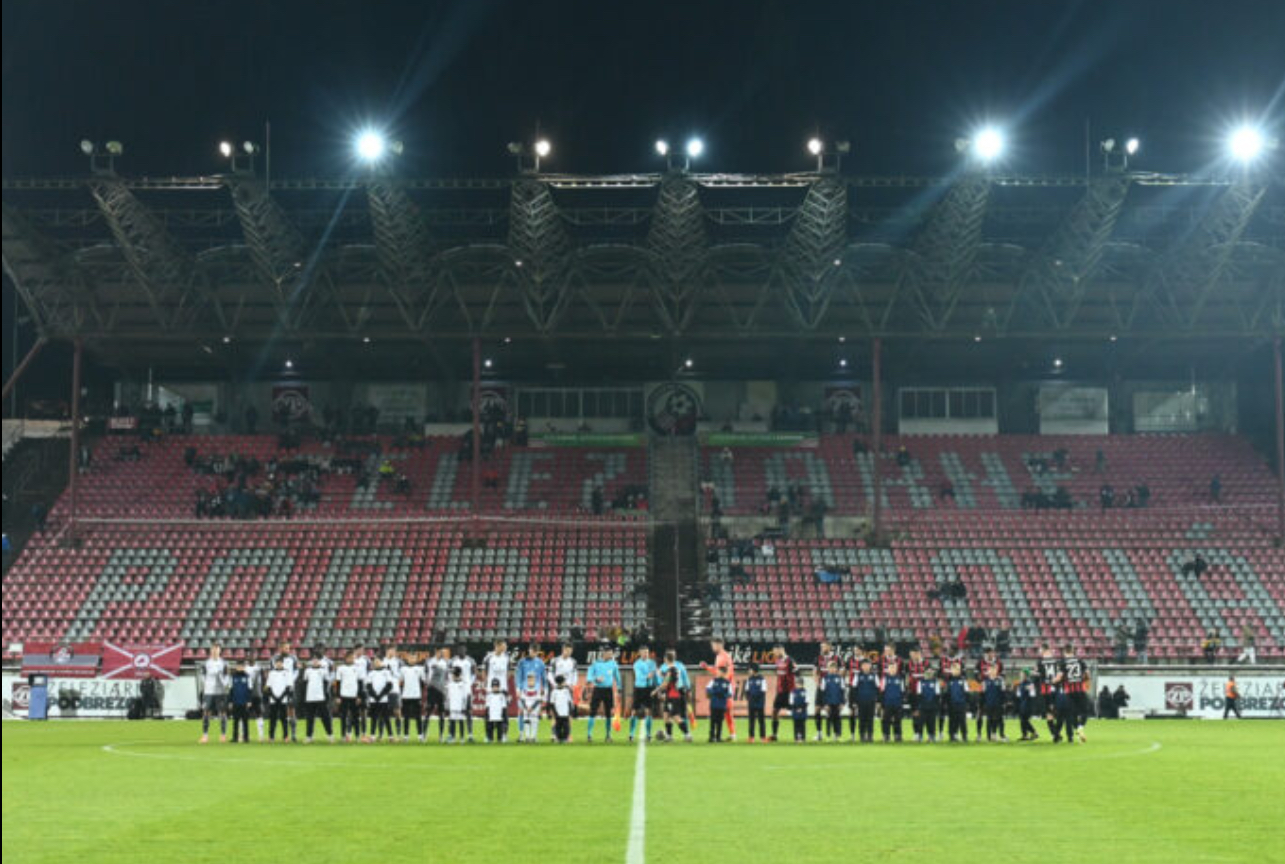
Players lining-up in front of the ZELPO Aréna.

In the first game of December, Spartak beat FK Železiarne Podbrezová 3–1 away from home thanks to a double from Timotej Kudlička and a stoppage-time goal by substitute Idjessi Metsoko.

=== January ===
On 5 December 2025, it was announced that Antonio Muñoz would be the new head coach of Spartak.

== Transfers ==
=== Summer ===
==== In ====
Pos.	Player	Transferred from	Fee	Date	Sources
FW	Idjessi Metsoko (TOG)	Viktoria Plzeň (CZ)	Loan to buy	3 June 2025	
DF	Denys Taraduda (UKR)	Zemplín Michalovce (SVK)	€170,000	6 June 2025	
FW	(Austria) Stefan Skrbo	(Austria) WSG Tirol	Free transfer	17 June 2025	
DF	(Sweden) Patrick Nwadike	(Sweden) IK Sirius Fotboll	Free transfer	20 June 2025	
DF	(Slovakia) Michal Tomič	(Czech Republic) Slavia Praga	Undisclosed	23 June 2025	
FW	(Nigeria) Hilary Gong	(Poland) Widzew Łódź	Free transfer	24 June 2025	
MF	(Georgia (country)) Giorgi Moistsrapishvili	(Georgia (country)) FC Kolkheti-1913 Poti	Undisclosed	25 June 2025	
DF	(Slovakia) Kristián Koštrna	(Slovakia) FK Železiarne Podbrezová	Undisclosed	28 June 2025	
FW	(Slovakia) Timotej Kudlička	(Slovakia) Dynamo Malženice	Loan to buy	1 July 2025	
MF	(Georgia (country)) Luka Khorkheli	(Georgia (country)) FC Samgurali Tskaltubo	Undisclosed	6 September 2025	
FW	(Nigeria) Abdulrahman Taiwo	(Latvia) Riga FC	Loan to Buy	6 September 2025	
DF	(Serbia) Lazar Stojsavljević	(Russia) FC Sochi 2013	Free transfer	15 September 2025	

==== Out ====
Pos.	Player	Transferred to	Fee	Date	Sources
MF	Adrian Zeljković (SVN)	Viktoria Plzeň (CZ)	€1.500,000-€2.000,000	3 June 2025	
MF	Kelvin Ofori (GHA)	Slovan Bratislava (SVK)	Free transfer	6 June 2025	
DF	(Nigeria) Kazeem Bolaji	(Slovakia) Banská Bystrica	Free transfer	1 July 2025	
DF	(Slovakia) Martin Šulek	(Slovakia) MFK Ružomberok	Free transfer	1 July 2025	
MF	(Slovakia) Martin Bukata	(Slovakia) FC ViOn Zlaté Moravce	Free transfer	16 July 2025	
DF	(Slovenia) Miha Kompan Breznik	(Slovakia) Dynamo Malženice	Free transfer	23 July 2025	
FW	(Slovakia) Róbert Pich	(Slovakia) FC Nitra	Free transfer	1 July 2025	
MF	(Belgium) Milan Corryn	–	Contract Termination	31 July 2025	
MF	(Czech Republic) Vojtěch Kubista	(Poland) Sandecja Nowy Sącz	Contract Termination	31 July 2025	
FW	(Czech Republic) Erik Daniel	(Slovakia) MFK Skalica	Contract Termination	26 August 2025	
Players out on loan
MF	(Slovakia) Filip Trello	(Slovakia) Dynamo Malženice	Loan		
FW	(Slovakia) Dávid Bukovský	(Slovakia) Dynamo Malženice	Loan		
Players retiring
DF	(Slovakia) Lukáš Štetina	(Slovakia) FC Nitra	Retirement	19 May 2025	
GK	(Slovakia) Dobrivoj Rusov	-	Retirement	19 May 2025	

=== Winter ===
==== In ====
Pos.	Player	Transferred from	Fee	Date	Sources
MF	Marin Laušić	(Latvia) FK Liepāja	Free transfer	24 January 2026	

==== Out ====
Pos.	Player	Transferred to	Fee	Date	Sources
Def	(Ukraine) Denys Taraduda	(Slovakia) 1. FC Tatran Prešov	Loan	15 January 2026	

== Friendlies ==
Win Draw Loss

=== Summer pre-season ===
18 June 2025 Friendly	ViOn Zlaté Moravce (Slovakia)	1–4	(Slovakia) Spartak Trnava	Jaslovské Bohunice, Slovakia
11:00	Mrva 61'	Report	Kudlička 30'; Corryn 50'; Daniel 55'; Ďuriš 90'

21 June 2025 Friendly	(Slovakia) Spartak Trnava	1–3	Karviná (Czech Republic)	Jaslovské Bohunice, Slovakia
16:30	Kudlička 75'	Report	Singhateh 30'; Samko 37'; Vecheta 83'

28 June 2025 Friendly	Banja Luka (Bosnia and Herzegovina)	1–0	(Slovakia) Spartak Trnava	Slovenia
18:00	Herrera 12'	Report	Jureškin (red card) 87'

Friendly	(Romania) Petrolul	1–0	(Slovakia) Spartak Trnava
10:30	Tommi Jyry 33'	Report

=== Summer pre-season statistics ===
Top goalscorer
Name	Goals
(Slovakia) Timotej Kudlička	2
(Slovakia) Michal Ďuriš	1
(Czech Republic) Erik Daniel	1
(Belgium) Milan Corryn	1

=== Winter pre-season ===
9 January 2026 Friendly	Spartak Trnava	6–1	Dynamo Malženice	Trnava
	Ďuriš 19'; Kudlička 30'; Škrbo 41'; Jureškin 66'; Taiwo (70 p); Twardzik 83'	Report	Mojžiš 40'

17 January 2026 Friendly	Spartak Trnava	1–3	Korona Kielce	Turkey
	Paur 36'	Report	Stepinski 46'; Dlugosz 49'; Cebula 83'

22 January 2026 Friendly	Spartak Trnava	1–0	CSKA 1948 Sofia	Turkey
	Paur 10'	Report
Note: Due to poor weather only one half was played.

Friendly	Spartak Trnava	v	Inter Bratislava

== Player statistics ==
=== Appearances ===
As of 5 January 2026
Pos	Name	League	Cup	Europe	Total
GK	(Slovenia) Žiga Frelih	18	0	6	24
GK	(Slovakia) Patrik Vasiľ	0	1	0	1
GK	(Slovakia) Martin Vantruba	0	1	0	1
DF	(Serbia) Lazar Stojsavljević	9	1	0	10
DF	(Croatia) Roko Jureškin	13	2	2	17
DF	(Slovakia) Martin Mikovič	14	0	6	20
DF	(Czech Republic) Libor Holík	16	1	6	23
DF	(Slovakia) Marek Ujlaky	4	1	2	7
DF	(Czech Republic) Filip Twardzik	9	1	3	13
DF	(Ukraine) Denys Taraduda	0	1	0	1
DF	(Sweden) Patrick Nwadike	10	0	6	16
DF	(Slovakia) Michal Tomič	5	2	3	10
DF	(Slovakia) Kristián Koštrna	12	1	6	19
DF	(Slovakia) Patrick Karhan	8	2	1	11
MF	(Czech Republic) Miloš Kratochvíl	12	1	5	18
MF	(Slovakia) Filip Trello	0	0	0	0
MF	(Slovakia) Erik Sabo	13	2	1	16
MF	(Slovakia) Roman Procházka	11	1	6	18
MF	(Burkina Faso) Cedric Badolo	4	2	4	10
MF	(Georgia (country)) Giorgi Moistsrapishvili	13	2	4	19
MF	(Georgia (country)) Luka Khorkheli	12	1	0	13
FW	(Slovakia) Jakub Paur	10	1	2	13
FW	(Nigeria) Philip Azango	13	1	6	20
FW	(Austria) Stefan Skrbo	15	2	5	22
FW	(Nigeria) Hilary Gong	7	1	4	12
FW	(Slovakia) Timotej Kudlička	16	2	6	24
FW	(Slovakia) Dávid Bukovský	0	0	0	0
FW	(Nigeria) Abdulrahman Taiwo	11	0	0	11
FW	(Slovakia) Michal Ďuriš	12	1	6	19
FW	(Togo) Idjessi Metsoko	4	0	0	4

=== Goals ===
As of 5 January 2026
Pos	Name	League	Cup	Europe	Total
GK	(Slovenia) Žiga Frelih	0	0	0	0
GK	(Slovakia) Patrik Vasiľ	0	0	0	0
GK	(Slovakia) Martin Vantruba	0	0	0	0
DF	(Serbia) Lazar Stojsavljević	0	0	0	0
DF	(Croatia) Roko Jureškin	0	1	0	1
DF	(Slovakia) Martin Mikovič	1	0	0	1
DF	(Czech Republic) Libor Holík	1	0	2	3
DF	(Slovakia) Marek Ujlaky	0	0	0	0
DF	(Czech Republic) Filip Twardzik	0	0	0	0
DF	(Ukraine) Denys Taraduda	0	0	0	0
DF	(Sweden) Patrick Nwadike	0	0	1	1
DF	(Slovakia) Michal Tomič	0	0	1	1
DF	(Slovakia) Kristián Koštrna	0	0	0	0
MF	(Czech Republic) Miloš Kratochvíl	0	0	1	1
MF	(Slovakia) Filip Trello	0	0	0	0
MF	(Slovakia) Erik Sabo	2	1	0	3
MF	(Slovakia) Roman Procházka	4	0	2	6
MF	(Slovakia) Patrick Karhan	0	0	0	0
MF	(Burkina Faso) Cedric Badolo	0	0	0	0
MF	(Georgia (country)) Giorgi Moistsrapishvili	0	0	1	1
MF	(Georgia (country)) Luka Khorkheli	1	1	0	2
FW	(Slovakia) Jakub Paur	1	2	0	3
FW	(Nigeria) Philip Azango	2	0	2	4
FW	(Austria) Stefan Skrbo	2	1	1	4
FW	(Nigeria) Hilary Gong	1	1	0	2
FW	(Slovakia) Timotej Kudlička	4	1	1	6
FW	(Slovakia) Dávid Bukovský	0	0	0	0
FW	(Nigeria) Abdulrahman Taiwo	6	0	0	6
FW	(Slovakia) Michal Ďuriš	3	0	0	3
FW	(Togo) Idjessi Metsoko	3	0	0	3

=== Clean sheets ===
As of 5 January 2026
Apps	Goalkeeper	League	Cup	Europe	Season total
1	(Slovenia) Žiga Frelih	7	0	0	7
72	(Slovakia) Martin Vantruba	0	1	0	1
41	(Slovakia) Patrik Vasiľ	0	0	0	0

=== Player awards and nominations ===
Month	Award	Player	Result	Votes	Ref
August/July	Player of the month	Žiga Frelih	4th	1.5%	
August/July	Goal of the month	Roman Procházka	Won	44,01%	
September	Goal of the month	Not nominated			
October	Goal of the month	Not nominated			
November	Goal of the month	Not nominated			
December	Goal of the month	Martin Mikovič	—		
December	Player of the month	Abdulrahman Taiwo	—		

== Competitions ==
Competition	First match	Last match	Starting round	Record						
Competition	First match	Last match	Starting round	Pld	W	D	L	GF	GA	GD
Slovak First Football League	27 July 2025		Matchday 1	18	11	2	5	34	18	+16
Slovak Cup	27 August 2025		Second round	3	2	1	0	9	2	+7
UEFA Europa League	10 July 2025	17 July 2025	First qualifying round	2	0	1	1	2	3	-1
UEFA Conference League	24 July 2025	14 August 2025	Second qualifying round	4	3	0	1	11	8	+3
Total				27	16	3	6	60	20	+28
5 January 2026

=== Slovak First League ===
==== Matches ====
Regular stage

27 July 2025 1	Spartak Trnava	3–0	Ružomberok	Trnava
19:00	Paur 43'; Azango 55'; Procházka 73'	Report	David Huf (red card) 59”	Stadium: Anton Malatinský Stadium; Attendance: 4,273; Referee: (Slovakia) Filip Glova; Man of the Match: (Georgia (country)) Moistsrapishvili

3 August 2025 2	AS Trenčín	0–1	Spartak Trnava	Trenčín
17:00	Sani (red card) 72”	Report	Daniel 45'; Jureškin (red card) 72”; Koštrna (red card) 99”	Stadium: Štadión Sihoť; Attendance: 4,489; Referee: Peter Ziemba; Man of the Match: (Czech Republic) Erik Daniel

10 August 2025 3	Spartak Trnava	1–0	Tatran Prešov	Trnava
19:00	Libor Holík 15'	Report		Stadium: Anton Malatinský Stadium; Attendance: 5,078; Referee: (Slovakia) Michal Smolák; Man of the Match: (Sweden) Patrick Nwadike

24 August 2025 5	Komarno	1–4	Spartak Trnava	Zlaté Moravce
17:00	Ganbayar Ganbold (yellow card) 12'; Martin Boďa 50'; Šimon Šmehyl (yellow card) 71'; Róbert Pillár (yellow card) 90'	Report	Michal Ďuriš 22'; Stefan Skrbo 26'; Stefan Skrbo 38'; Stefan Skrbo (yellow card) 55'; Roman Procházka (pen) 68'; Cedric Badolo (red card)	Stadium: ViOn Aréna; Attendance: 2,987; Referee: Boris Marhefka; Man of the Match: (Austria) Stefan Škrbo

31 August 2025 6	Spartak Trnava	0–3	Dunajská Streda

13 September 2025 7	MFK Skalica	0–4	Spartak Trnava	Skalica
18:00	Podhorin (red card) 3'; Pudhorocký (yellow card) 35'; Černek (yellow card) 74'	Report	Azango 13'; Taiwo 29'; (yellow card) 49' Moistsrapishvili; Procházka 82'; Ďuriš 86'	Stadium: Mestský štadión Skalica; Attendance: 3,013; Referee: (Slovakia) Matej Choreň; Man of the Match: (Sweden) Patrick Nwadike

21 September 2025 8	Spartak Trnava	0–1	Michalovce
19:00

28 September 2025 9	MŠK Žilina	2–2	Spartak Trnava	Žilina
19:00	Iľko 23'; Faško 69'	Report	Procházka 72'; Gong 85'	Stadium: Štadión pod Dubňom; Attendance: 4,261; Referee: Michal Smolák

18 October 2025 11	Spartak Trnava	0–2	Slovan Bratislava
18:00

26 October 2025 12	MFK Ružomberok	1–1	Spartak Trnava
15:30

29 October 2025 4	Spartak Trnava	3–1	FC Košice
18:00

2 November 2025 13	Spartak Trnava	4–0	AS Trenčín
18:00

9 November 2025 14	Tatran Prešov	2–1	Spartak Trnava
18:00

22 November 2025 15	FC Košice	1–2	Spartak Trnava
18:00

29 November 2025 16	Spartak Trnava	2–0	Komárno
15:30

3 December 2025 10	Železiarne Podbrezová	1–3	Spartak Trnava
18:00

7 December 2025 17	DAC Dunajská Streda	3–1	Spartak Trnava

13 December 2025 18	Spartak Trnava	2–0	Skalica
15:30

8 February 2026 19	Zemplín Michalovce	v	Spartak Trnava
18:00

15 February 2026 20	Spartak Trnava	v	Žilina
18:00

21 February 2026 21	Spartak Trnava	v	Železiarne Podbrezová
18:00

28 February 2026 22	Slovan Bratislava	v	Spartak Trnava
15:30

=== Slovak Cup ===
27 August 2025 Second round	AC Nitra	1—4	Spartak Trnava	Nitra
17:00	Hambálek 64'	Report	Kudlička 36'; Sabo 38'; Gong 42'; Škrbo 91'	Stadium: Štadión pod Zoborom; Attendance: 4,345; Referee: (Slovakia) B. Kišš

Third round	FK Beluša	0–4	Spartak Trnava	Beluša
		Report	Paur 20'; Khorkheli 48'; Paur 57'; Jureškin 65'

Fourth round	Šamorín	1–1 (4–5 p)	Spartak Trnava

Round of 16	Spartak Trnava	v	Slovan Bratislava

=== UEFA Europa League ===
==== First qualifying round ====
10 July 2025 First leg	Spartak Trnava (Slovakia)	0–1	(Sweden) BK Häcken	Anton Malatinský Stadium, Trnava
20:15		Report	Nioule 63'	Attendance: 10,125; Referee: Bence Csonka (Hungary)

17 July 2025 Second leg	BK Häcken (Sweden)	2–2 (3–2 agg.)	(Slovakia) Spartak Trnava	Bravida Arena, Gothenburg
19:00	Gustafson 13' (pen.); Dembe 90+6'	Report	Procházka 65'; Moistsrapishvili 82'	Attendance: 3,636; Referee: Ivar Orri Kristjansson (Iceland)

=== UEFA Conference League ===
==== Second qualifying round ====
24 July 2025 First leg	Hibernians (Malta)	1–2	(Slovakia) Spartak Trnava	Paola
18:00	Charleston 79'	Report	Holík 27'; Procházka 84' (Pen)	Stadium: Centenary Stadium, Ta' Qali; Referee: Visar Kastrati (Kosovo)

31 July 2025 Second leg	Spartak Trnava (Slovakia)	5–1 (7–2 agg.)	(Malta) Hibernians	Trnava
17:30	Holík 4'; Škrbo (13); Tomič 47'; Pedro 54' (OG); Azango 57'	Report	Miullen 37'	Stadium: Anton Malatinský Stadium, Trnava; Attendance: 9,310; Referee: Pavle Ilić (Serbia); Man of the Match: (Austria) Stefan Škrbo

==== Third qualifying round ====
7 August 2025 First leg	CS Universitatea Craiova (Romania)	3–0	(Slovakia) Spartak Trnava	Craiova
21:30 UTC+3	Baiaram 51'; Al Hamlawi 54'; Houri (yellow card) 72'; Mora 80'		Paur (red card) 87'; Kudlička (yellow card) 90+6'	Stadium: Ion Oblemenco Stadium; Attendance: 22,664; Referee: Joonas Jaanovits (Estonia)

14 August 2025 Second leg	Spartak Trnava (Slovakia)	4–3 (a.e.t.) (4–6 agg.)	(Romania) Universitatea Craiova	Trnava, Slovakia
20:30 UTC+2	Kratochvíl 36'; Nwadike 63'; Azango 68'; Kudlička 80', (yellow card) 99'; Mikovič (yellow card) 93'		Screciu (yellow card) 13'; Teles (yellow card) 30'; Baiaram 32'; Romanchuk (yellow card) 66'; Băluță 101'; Nsimba 117'	Stadium: Anton Malatinský Stadium; Referee: Stuart Attwell (England)

=== Home attendances ===
As of 30 Aug 2025

	Matches	Attendances	Average	High	Low
Slovak First Football League	3	18,674	6,224	9,323	4,273
Slovak Cup	0				
Conference League	2	18,647	19,631	9,337	9,310
Europa League	1	10,125	10,125	10,125	10,125
