= Timotej Kudlička =

Slovak footballer (born 2003)

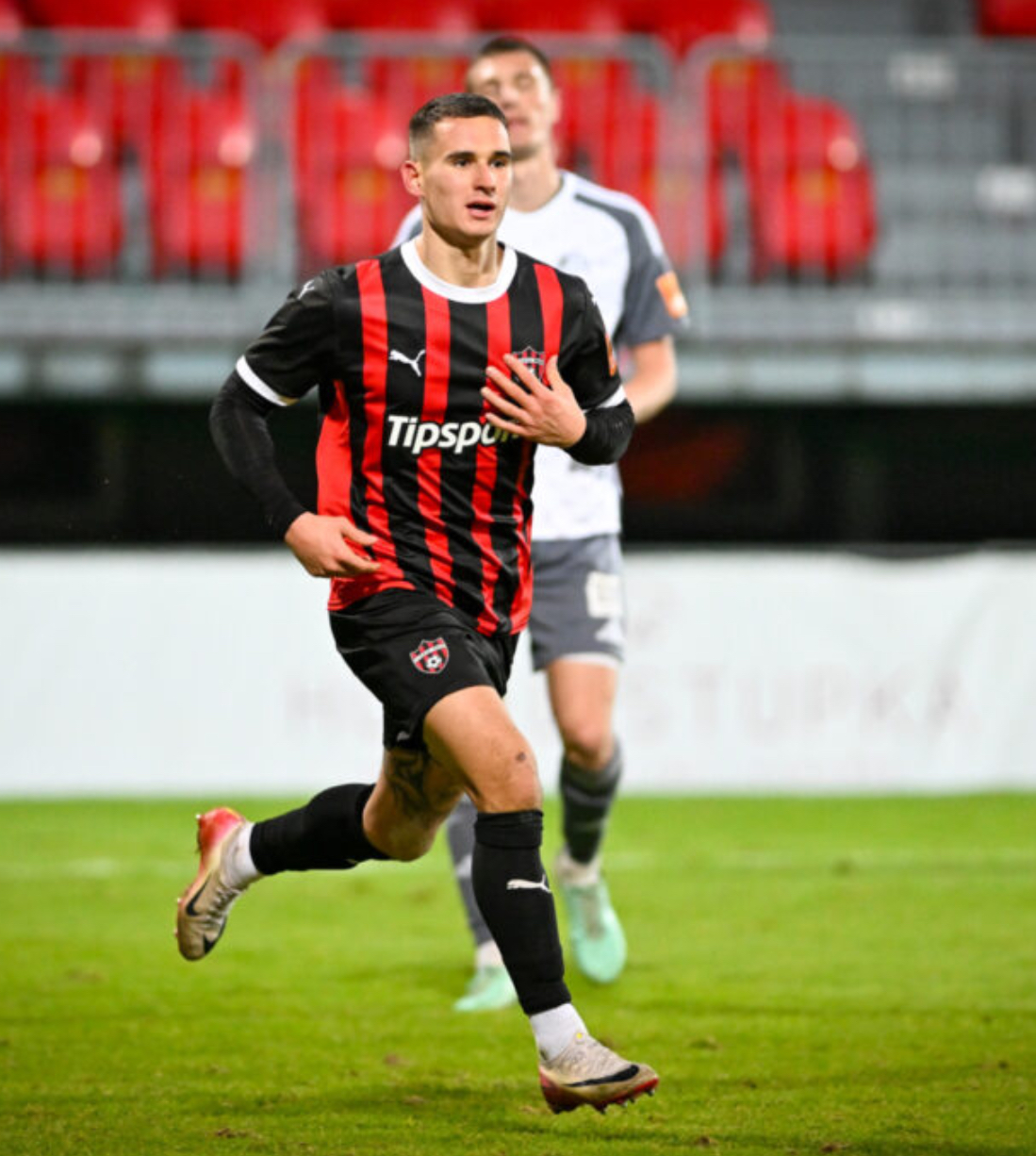
- Kudlička with Spartak Trnava (2025)

Personal information
- Date of birth: 19 August 2003 (age 23)
- Place of birth: Močenok, Slovakia
- Height: 1.79 m (5 ft 10 in)
- Positions: Forward; winger

Team information
- Current team: Spartak Trnava
- Number: 19

Youth career
- 2010–2015: FC Močenok
- 2015–2018: Nitra
- 2018–2022: Spartak Trnava

Senior career*
| Years | Team | Apps | (Gls) |
| 2022–2024 | Žilina B | 35 | (5) |
| 2024–2025 | Dynamo Malženice | 19 | (7) |
| 2025– | Spartak Trnava | 44 | (13) |

International career
| 2021 | Slovakia U18 | 1 | (0) |
- * Club domestic league appearances and goals as of 21 November 2026

Timotej Kudlička (born 19 August 2003) is a Slovak professional footballer who currently plays for Spartak Trnava as a forward or a winger.

== Early life ==
Kudlička was born on 19 August 2003 in Močenok. He began his career at local club FC Močenok.

== Club career ==
Kudlička is a product of the FC Spartak Trnava youth academy. While at Spartak, he would not make a professional appearance. Kudlička featured on the bench in a 0–0 draw against Slovan Bratislava in 2019.

=== Žilina B ===
After leaving the youth academy of Spartak Trnava, Kudlička joined MŠK Žilina B in the 2. Liga. He played his first professional game against Považská Bystrica in a 3–2 loss on 12 August 2022. On 12 June 2024 it was announced that he would be leaving Žilina B. During this period, Kudlička was unable to establish himself enough to get a chance in the first team of MŠK Žilina. At his time in Žilina B, he played a total of 38 competitive matches for the reserve team and scored 3 goals and 4 assists in the span of 2 seasons.

=== Dynamo Malženice ===
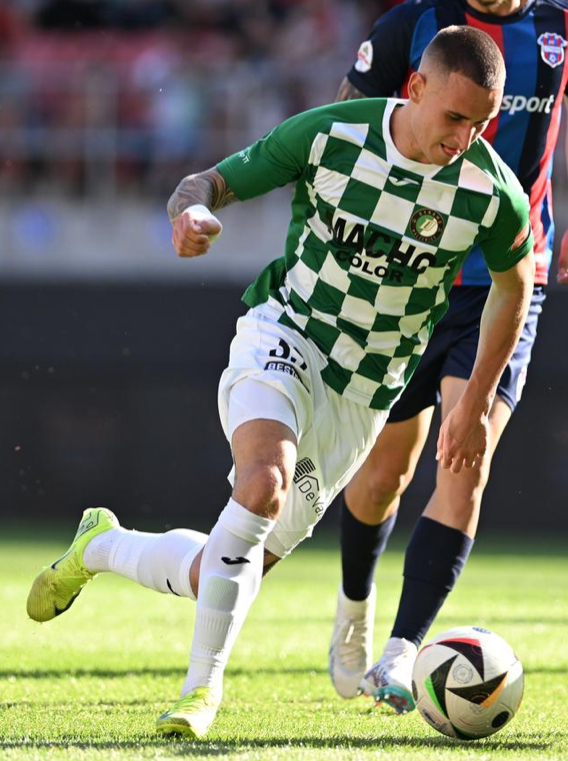
Kudlička with Malženice.

On 1 July 2024, Kudlička joined 2nd division side, Dynamo Malženice on a free transfer. He received a red card on his debut for the club in a 2–1 win over FK Humenné. Kudlička scored his first goal for Malženice in a 2–0 win over Stará Ľubovňa, scoring a penalty in the 42nd minute to secure a win. On 20 April 2025, he scored his first double in a 2–1 home win over MŠK Púchov. In his debut season for Dynamo Malženice, he played 19 times scoring 7 goals and providing 6 assists, being the second top goal scorer of the club behind Boris Druga.

=== Spartak Trnava ===
==== 2025-26 season ====
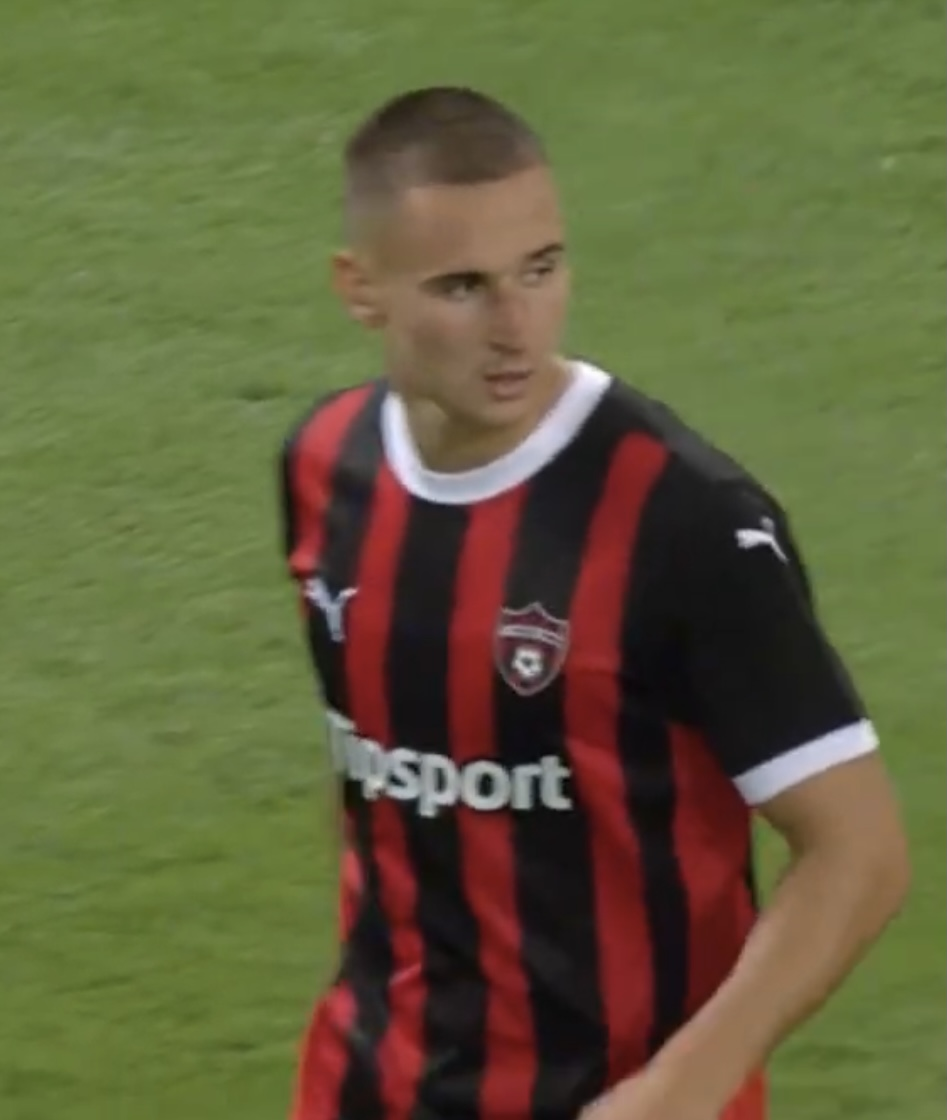
Kudlička on his debut for Spartak

After good performances for Spartak in pre-season, scoring 2 goals in 4 appearances, it was announced that Kudlička would be joining the club on a loan. He made his debut for Spartak in a 1–0 loss against BK Häcken in the Europa League qualifications, coming on as a substitute for Philip Azango in the 79th minute. In the 88th minute he had a chance to equalize the game, however his shot was off target. He showed himself in a good light on the pitch, impressing with his movement, aggressive attacking and technical ability. Kudlička also made an appearance in the second leg, coming on as a substitute once again for Philip Azango in the 69th minute. He was involved in the build up to the second goal for Spartak, scored by debutant Giorgi Moistsrapishvili.

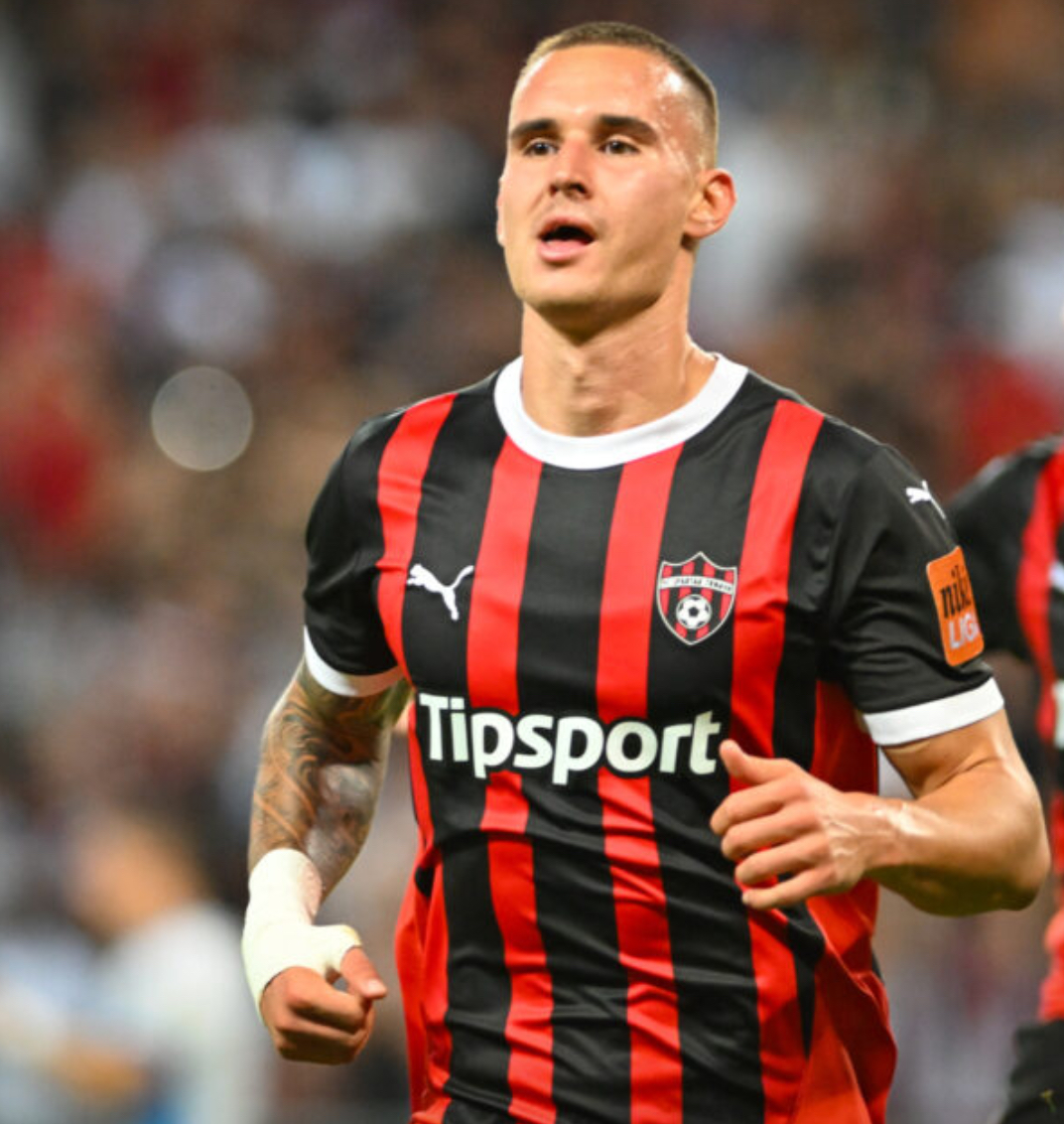
Kudlička celebrating his goal against Universitatea Craiova

In a Conference League qualification match against Hibernians F.C., Kudlička won a penalty for his team in the 84th minute after being fouled by Hibernians goalkeeper Laurențiu Brănescu. The penalty was scored by Roman Procházka to make the final score of 2–1 for Spartak. Kudlička made his first first league debut for Spartak in 3–0 win over MFK Ružomberok, coming on as a substitute in the 69th minute He had a chance to score his debut goal however his shot went just wide of the goal. Kudlička scored his first goal for the club in a 4–3 win over Universitatea Craiova in the Conference League qualifiers. After coming on as a substitute in the 61st minute, he was able to increase the score for Spartak in the 80th minute to 4–1 after a cross by Giorgi Moistsrapishvili. Despite winning the game, the club were knocked out 6–4 on aggregate.

Kudlička received his first start in the Trnava jersey in a 4–1 Slovak Cup win against AC Nitra. After a pass from Hilary Gong, he was able to score after a shot from outside the box.

Kudlička scored his first top division goal in a 3–1 win over FC Košice. After coming onto the field in the 30th minute as a substitute for Stefan Skrbo, Kudlička would score in the 32nd minute to level the game. In the 33rd minute, Abdulrahman Taiwo would score to make the game 2–1 in Spartak’s favor. Kudlička would also set up the 3rd goal scored by Michal Ďuriš to seal the game. On 3 December 2025, he scored a double in a 3–1 away win over FK Železiarne Podbrezová. On 20 February 2026, it was announced that Kudlička would be permanently joining Spartak Trnava, signing a 4-year contract. In his first season for the club, he scored 5 goals in 30 appearances.

== International career ==
On 17 March 2021, Kudlička played a game for the Slovakia U18 team in a friendly against Russia U18, losing 2–1.

== Style of play ==
Kudlička has been praised for his movement, aggressive attacking and technical ability.

== Personal life ==
Kudlička has a brother called Peter who plays as a striker and also played for Malženice at one time. Peter used to play in the lower leagues of Austrian football. He currently plays for 3. Liga club ŠKF Sereď.

== Career statistics ==
As of 2 June 2026

| Club | Season | League | | Cup | | Europe | |
| Club | Season | Apps | Goals | Apps | Goals | Apps | Goals |
|---|---|---|---|---|---|---|---|
| MŠK Žilina B | 2022-23 | 18 | 2 | — | | — | |
| MŠK Žilina B | 2023-24 | 17 | 3 | — | | — | |
| Dynamo Malženice | 2024-25 | 19 | 7 | — | | — | |
| Spartak Trnava (loan) | 2025-26 | 30 | 5 | 4 | 1 | 7 | 1 |
| Total | | 84 | 17 | 4 | 1 | 7 | 1 |
