= Patrick Nwadike =

Swedish footballer (born 1998)

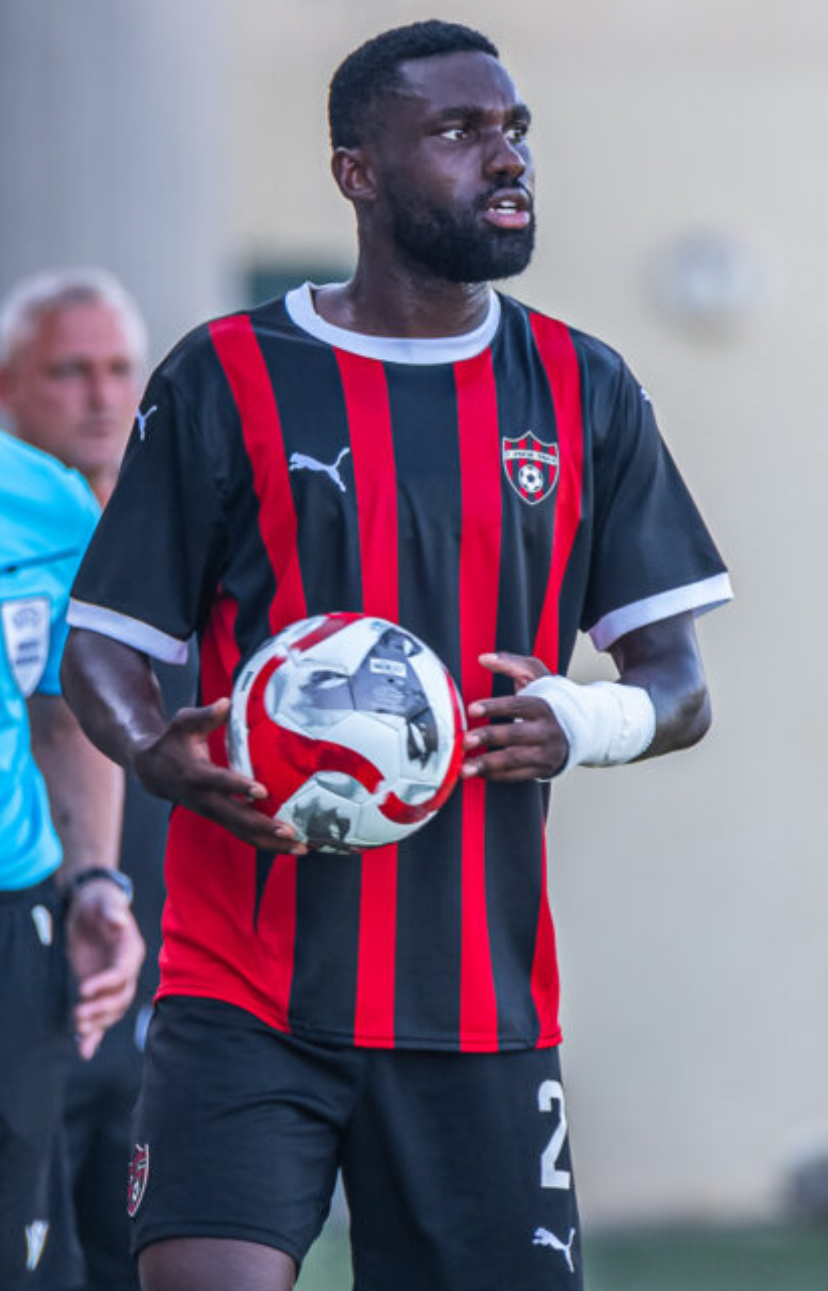
- Nwadike with Spartak Trnava in 2025

Personal information
- Full name: Patrick Emeka Nwadike
- Date of birth: 29 August 1998 (age 28)
- Place of birth: Stockholm, Sweden
- Height: 1.90 m (6 ft 3 in)
- Position: Centre-back

Team information
- Current team: Spartak Trnava
- Number: 2

Youth career
- IK Wormo
- –2016: Landskrona BoIS

Senior career*
Years	Team	Apps	(Gls)
2017–2018	IK Wormo	16	(2)
2019–2020	Landskrona BoIS	42	(5)
2019	→ Prespa Birlik (loan)	5	(0)
2021–2025	IK Sirius	47	(1)
2025–	Spartak Trnava	16	(0)

International career^{‡}
2026–	Haiti	2	(0)
- * Club domestic league appearances and goals as of 21 November 2026 ‡ National team caps and goals as of 17 November 2026

Patrick Emeka Nwadike (born 29 August 1998) is a professional footballer who plays for Slovak side FC Spartak Trnava. Born in Sweden, he represents Haiti internationally.

== Early life ==
Nwadike was born in Stockholm to a father from Nigeria, and a mother from Haiti.

== Club career ==
=== Early career ===
At the youth level, he played for Landskrona. He began his professional career in the third division at IK Wormo, where he played 15 games and scored two goals. In March of 2019, he returned to Landskrona, signing a two-year contract with the club. He made his debut for the club on June 8 in a match of the next round in the first Swedish division against Ljungskile, entering the field in the middle of the first half. He also played five matches for the feeder club Prespa Birlik during the year.

=== IK Sirus ===
On December 16, 2020, he signed a contract with Sirius, a club which plays in Allsvenskan. He played his first game for the club on February 20, 2021, as part of the group stage of the national cup against Lødde, replacing Jamie Roche at half-time. On May 8, he made his debut in the Swedish championship in a match against Hammarby, appearing on the field in the 86th minute for Adam Ståhl. On 12 June 2025 it was announced that Nwadike would not be renewing his contract with IK Sirius and would be leaving on a free transfer, presumably to Slovak side FC Spartak Trnava.

=== Spartak Trnava ===
==== 2025-26 season ====
On 20 June 2025, it was announced that Nwadike would be joining FC Spartak Trnava. He made his debut for the club in the first round of the Europa League qualification in a 1–0 loss to BK Häcken, playing the full 90” minutes. Nwadike made his league debut in a 1–0 win over newcomers Tatran Presov. He was able to score a bicycle kick however the goal was disallowed after a foul in the build up. He won the man of the match. Nwadike scored his first goal for Spartak in a 4–3 win over Romanian club Universitatea Craiova in the Conference league qualifiers, heading the ball after a cross from Giorgi Moistsrapishvili. Despite winning the game, Spartak were knocked out 6–4 on aggregate. Nwadike was injured in a match against Tatran Prešov in November 2025. For the rest of the season he would only make one appearance for Trnava in a friendly against Dynamo Malženice, where he was once again injured.

== International career ==
Born in Sweden to a Haitian mother and a Nigerian father, Nwadike was eligible to represent Denmark, Sweden and Nigeria, as well as Haiti at international level.

In November 2026, he received his first senior call-up to the Haiti national team for the CONCACAF Nations League quarter-final fixtures against the United States. He made his Haiti debut on 14 November 2026 in the first leg of the quarter-final.
