= Luka Khorkheli =

Georgian footballer (born 2000)

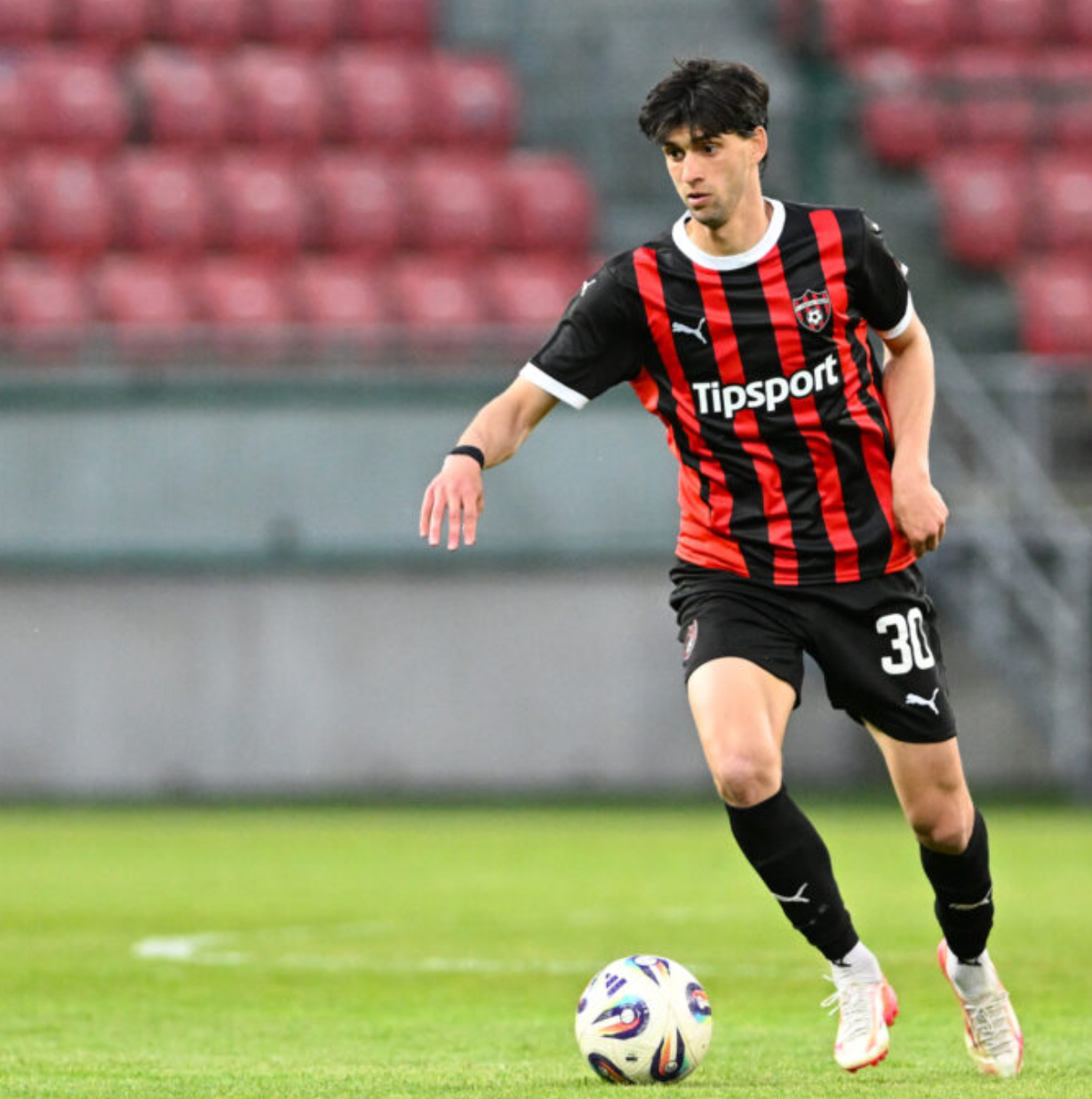
- Khorkheli playing for Spartak Trnava in 2026

Personal information
- Date of birth: 31 January 2000 (age 26)
- Place of birth: Tbilisi, Georgia
- Height: 1.87 m (6 ft 2 in)
- Positions: Attacking midfielder; winger

Team information
- Current team: Spartak Trnava
- Number: 30

Youth career
- Dinamo Tbilisi

Senior career*
Years	Team	Apps	(Gls)
2018	FC Iberia 2010		
2019	Gori		
2020	Spaeri		
2021–2022	Sioni	67	(11)
2023–2025	Samgurali	79	(19)
2025–	Spartak Trnava	38	(7)

International career
2022–2023	Georgia U21	4	(0)
- * Club domestic league appearances and goals as of 21 November 2026

Luka Khorkheli (Georgian: ლუკა ხორხელი; born 31 January 2000) is a Georgian professional footballer who plays as a midfielder for Slovak club Spartak Trnava.

He has won the Erovnuli Liga 2 of Georgia.

== Club career ==
=== Early career ===
Khorkheli grew up at Dinamo Tbilisi's academy. After several seasons spent at Iberia, Gori and Spaeri, in early 2021, he joined 2nd division club Sioni. Khorkheli opened his goal-scoring account in a 5–2 win at Chikhura on 13 June 2021. Overall, he netted five times and helped the team to advance to the Erovnuli Liga.

In his first top-flight season, Khorkheli featured in 37 games across all competitions, scoring six goals. But his club failed to beat Samtredia in playoffs and suffered relegation which resulted in Khorkheli's transfer to Samgurali on a three-year deal.

=== Samgurali ===
Back in the league, Khorkheli shone during his second season at Samgurali in 2024, becoming the team's topscorer with eleven league goals. It included seven goals and two assists in 9 matches that he recorded after the mid-season, which earned him recognition from the Erovnuli Liga as the best player of this period. Summing up the season, the Lelo sport newspaper named him Discovery of the Year.

=== Spartak Trnava ===
==== 2025-26 season ====
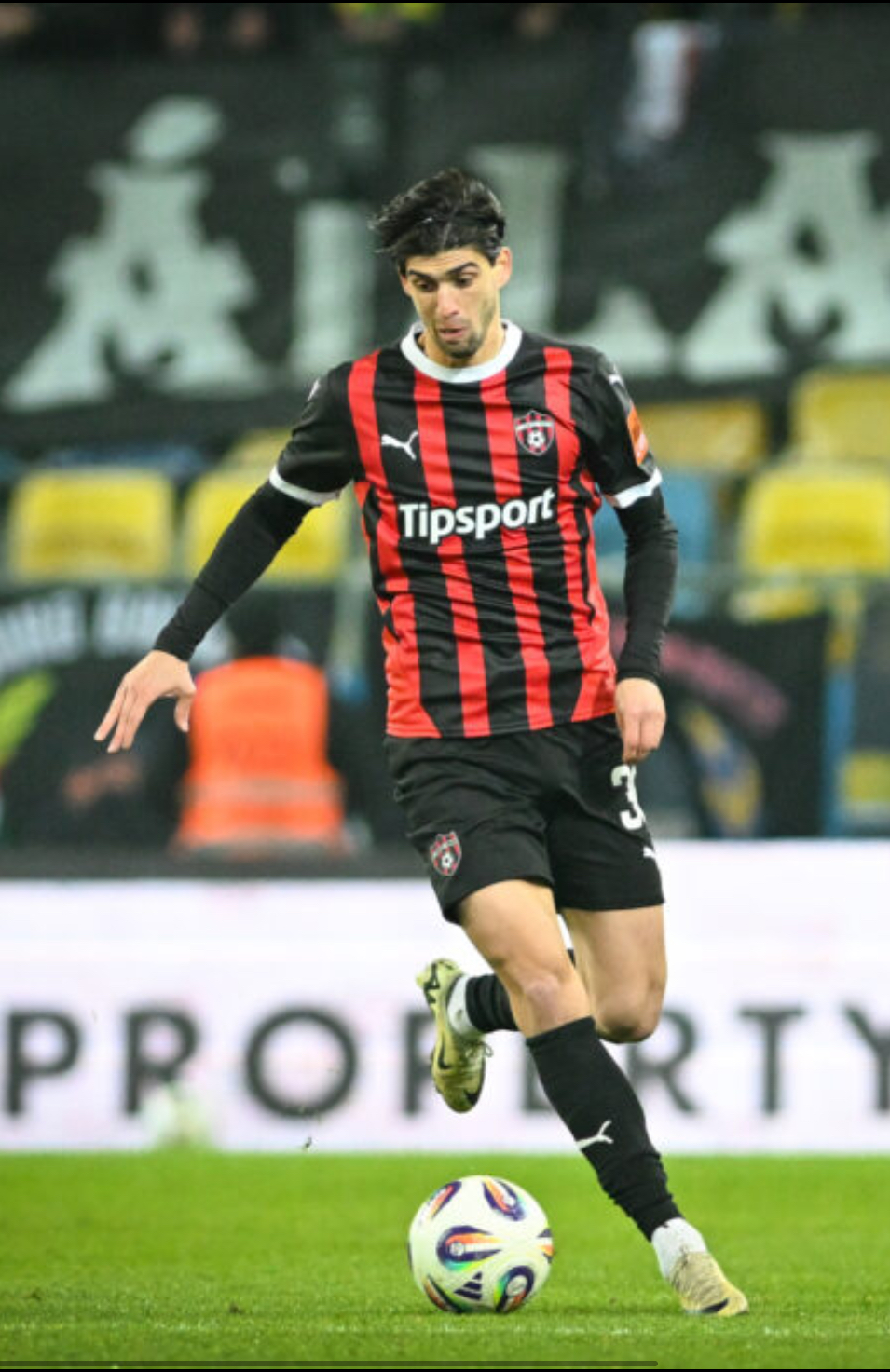
Khorkheli playing against DAC Dunajska Streda in 2025

On 6 September 2025, on the deadline day of the transfer window, it was announced that Khorkheli would be joining Slovak club FC Spartak Trnava, signing a 3-year contract. He made his debut for the club on 21 September 2025 in a match against MFK Zemplín Michalovce, coming onto the field in the 80th minute for Philip Azango. Three days later, Khorkeli would score his first goal for Spartak. In the 3rd round of the Slovak Cup against 3rd league side FK Beluša with the game set at 1–0 to the away side, he would come on at half-time and score in the 48th minute. The game finished 4–0 in Spartak's favor. Khorkeli got his first start for Spartak Trnava in a 2–0 win against KFC Komárno. He scored his first goal for the club in a 2–0 home win against MFK Skalica, heading in a cross from captain Martin Mikovič. Khorkeli scored a brace in a 4–1 winter preparation win against 2nd division side Inter Bratislava. He scored the winning goal of a 1–0 away win against MŠK Žilina. Between March and April, Khorkeli scored five goals in seven appearances, helping Spartak Trnava achieve 3rd place and qualifying to the Conference League second qualifying round.

== International career ==
Between the years 2022–23, Khorkheli was several times called up to the U21s. He made four appearances for the team.

== Personal life ==
Khorkheli's grandfather, father and uncle all used to play football. Also, all five brothers in his family are footballers with Nika Khorkheli being Luka's teammate for the most of his career.

== Statistics ==
As of match played 10 May 2026

Appearances and goals by club, season and competition
Club	Season	League			National cup		Continental		Other		Total	
Club	Season	Division	Apps	Goals	Apps	Goals	Apps	Goals	Apps	Goals	Apps	Goals
Sioni	2021	Erovnuli Liga 2	33	5	2	0	–		–		35	5
Sioni	2022	Erovnuli Liga	34	6	2	0	–		2 (Note: Appearances in Erovnuli Liga playoffs)	0	38	6
Sioni	Total		67	11	4	0	0	0	2	0	73	11
Samgurali	2023	Erovnuli Liga	27	1	3	2	–		–		30	3
Samgurali	2024	Erovnuli Liga	30	11	2	1	–		–		32	12
Samgurali	2025	Erovnuli Liga	22	7	1	0	–		–		23	7
Samgurali	Total		79	19	6	3	0	0	0	0	85	22
Spartak Trnava	2025–26	Nike Liga	24	6	3	1	0	0	3 (Note: Appearances in winter preparations)	2	30	9
Career total			170	35	13	4	0	0	5	2	188	41

== Honours ==
Sioni

- Erovnuli Liga 2: 2021
