= Dávid Bukovský =

Slovak footballer (born 2007)

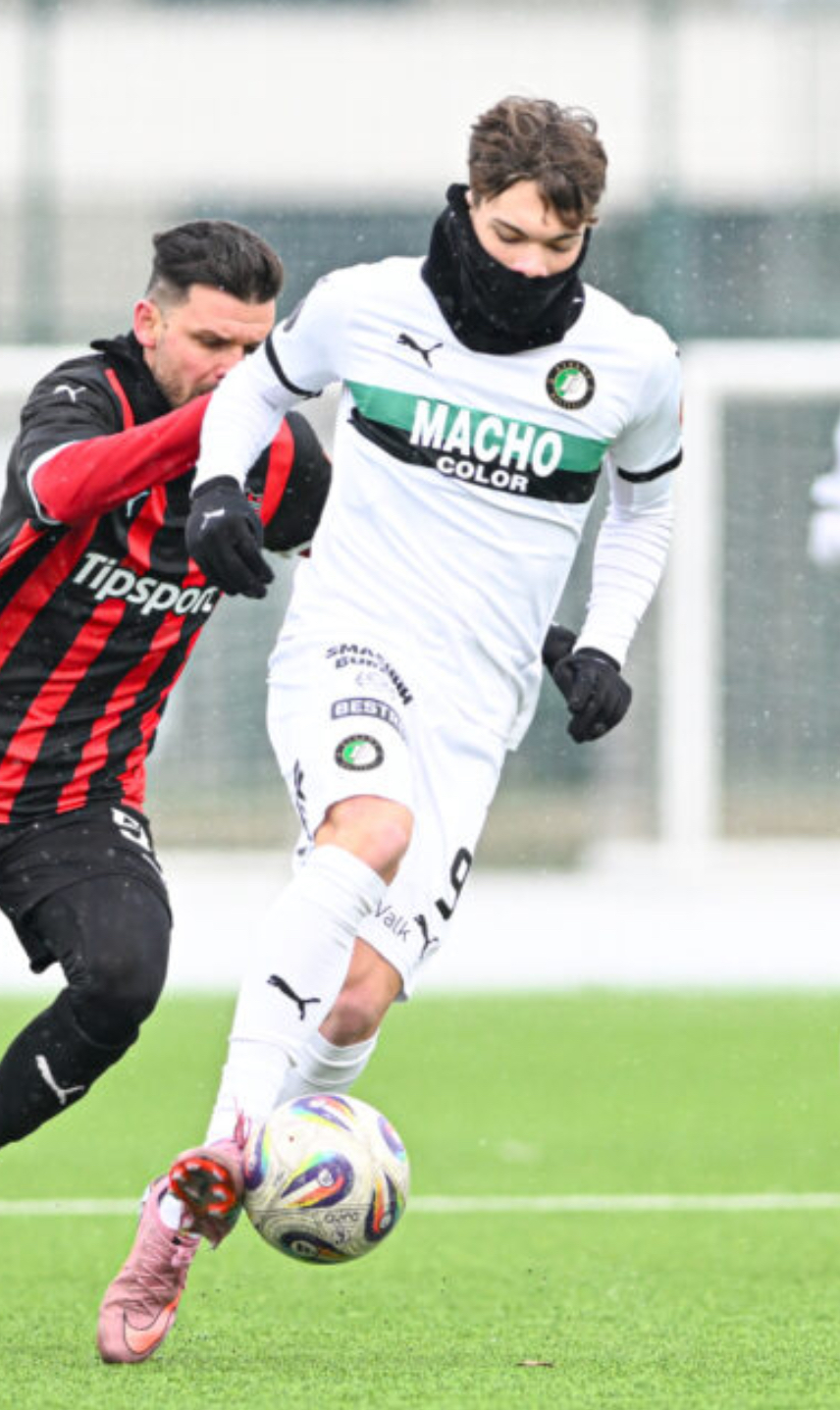
- Bukovský (in white) playing for Malženice in 2026.

Personal information
- Date of birth: 27 August 2007 (age 19)
- Place of birth: Trnava, Slovakia
- Height: 1.78 m (5 ft 10 in)
- Positions: Winger; forward

Team information
- Current team: Spartak Trnava
- Number: 22

Youth career
- 2013–2017: FO ŠK Modranka
- 2017–2024: Spartak Trnava

Senior career*
Years	Team	Apps	(Gls)
2024–	Spartak Trnava	8	(1)
2024–2026	→ Dynamo Malženice (loan)	47	(10)

International career^{‡}
	Slovakia U16	5	(0)
	Slovakia U17	10	(0)
	Slovakia U18	1	(0)
	Slovakia U19	7	(1)
- * Club domestic league appearances and goals as of 21 November 2026 ‡ National team caps and goals as of 17 December 2025

Dávid Bukovský (born 27 August 2007) is a Slovak professional footballer who plays for Spartak Trnava.

== Club career ==
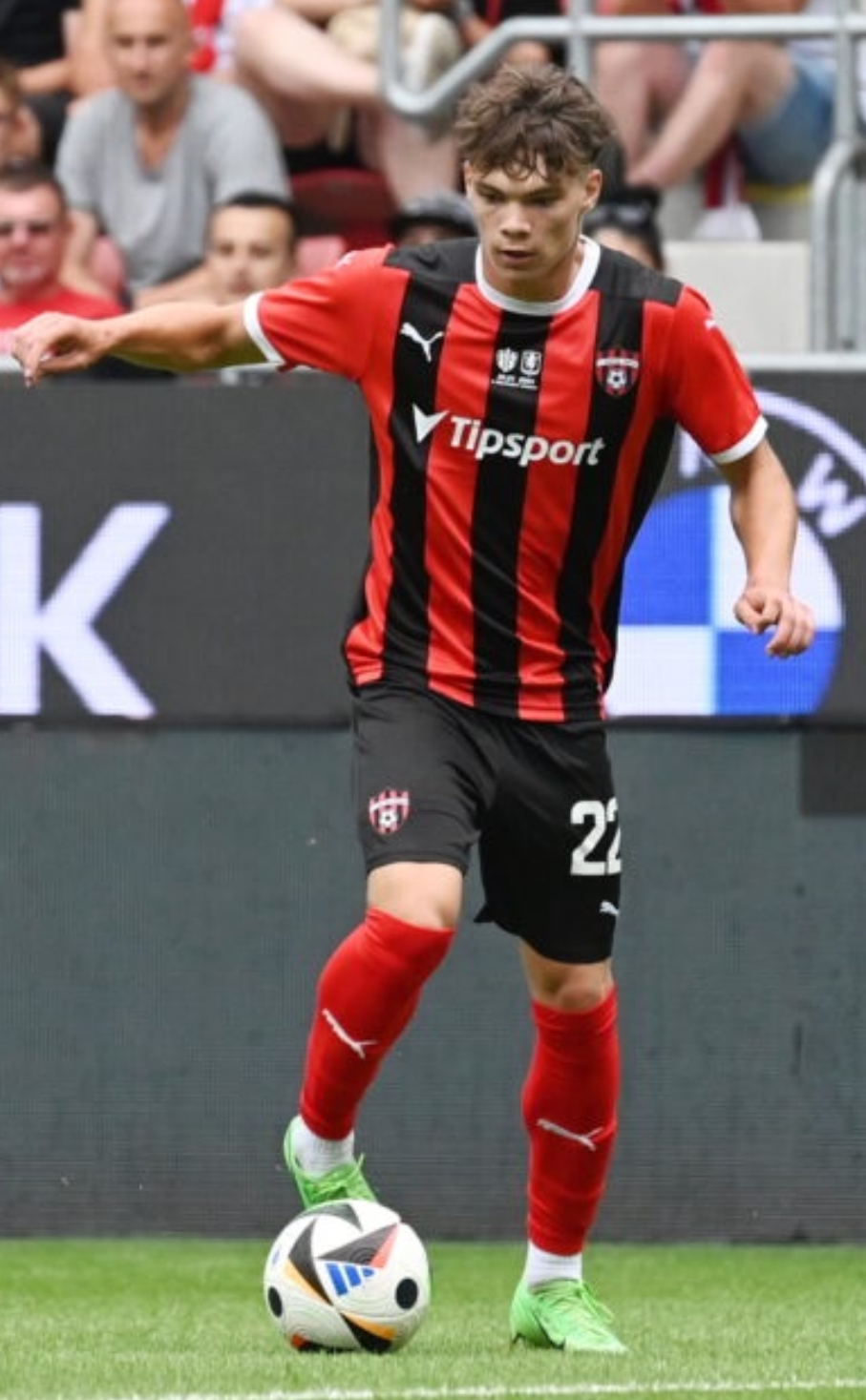
Bukovský on his debut against Aston Villa.

=== Spartak Trnava ===
Bukovský is a product of Spartak Trnava academy, signing to the academy at age 15. He was considered a talented forward. On 15 July 2024 he signed his first professional contract with the club, signing on a 3-year long deal alongside teammate Martin Turanský. Bukovský played his first game for Spartak in a 3–0 loss to English side Aston Villa in a summer friendly, coming off the bench in the 80th minute. He had a chance to score in the 90th minute but his shot went over the goal.

Bukovský made his professional debut for Spartak Trnava in a 2–1 win against FK Železiarne Podbrezová, coming off the bench as a substitute in the 90th minute for Cedric Badolo alongside academy graduate Filip Trello.

==== Dynamo Malzenice (loan) ====
In the summer transfer window of 2025, Bukovský joined Spartak's feeder club Dynamo Malženice on a 1-year loan alongside six other players from Spartak Trnava. On 19 September 2025, Bukovský scored two goals in a 3–1 win over MŠK Považská Bystrica, sealing the 3 points for his team. He scored a goal in a 2–1 win against MŠK Žilina B. Bukovský was selected by the new coach of Spartak Trnava, Antonio Muñoz to be a part of the squad for Spartak ahead of the winter preparation.

== International career ==
Bukovský currently plays for the Slovak national under-18 football team. He made his debut for the under-18's is a 2–1 loss against Switzerland U18.

== Career statistics ==
As of 27 May 2026

Appearances and goals by club, season and competition
Club	Season	League			Cup		League Cup		Europe		Total	
Club	Season	Division	Apps	Goals	Apps	Goals	Apps	Goals	Apps	Goals	Apps	Goals
Spartak Trnava	2024–25	Slovak First Football League	1	0	—		—		—		1	0
Dynamo Malženice (loan)	2025–26	Slovak 2. Liga	28	7	0	0	—			0	28	7
Career total			29	7	0	0	0	0	0	0	29	7
