= Abdulrahman Taiwo =

Nigerian footballer (born 1998)

Personal information
- Date of birth: 5 August 1998 (age 28)
- Place of birth: Lagos, Nigeria
- Height: 1.85 m (6 ft 1 in)
- Position: Forward

Team information
- Current team: Riga
- Number: 19

Youth career
- Abees Academy Abuja
- Kwara United

Senior career*
Years	Team	Apps	(Gls)
2016–2017	Kwara United		
2017	Bursaspor	0	(0)
2017	Zbrojovka Brno	0	(0)
2018–2019	Nitra	18	(3)
2019–2021	DAC Dunajská Streda	33	(10)
2020	→ Karviná (loan)	13	(3)
2020	→ Zemplín Michalovce (loan)	8	(6)
2021–2023	SønderjyskE	17	(1)
2022–2023	→ Spartak Trnava (loan)	21	(14)
2023–	Riga	46	(10)
2024	→ Auda (loan)	12	(9)
2025–2026	→ Spartak Trnava (loan)	15	(6)

International career
2016	Nigeria U23	1	(0)
- * Club domestic league appearances and goals as of 12 November 2026

Abdulrahman Taiwo (born 5 August 1998) is a Nigerian professional footballer who plays as a forward for Riga.

== Club career ==
=== Early career ===
Taiwo played in Nigeria with Abees Academy Abuja and Kwara United. In 2017, he had a nine-month stint with Turkish club Bursaspor, which preceded a move to FC Zbrojovka Brno of the Czech First League in September 2017. In January 2018, Taiwo completed a transfer to Slovakia to join Nitra. He scored five goals in pre-season for Nitra, notably netting braces against ex-team FC Zbrojovka Brno and MTK Budapest respectively. He made his debut on 28 July in the Slovak Super Liga, featuring for the full duration of a 2–1 loss against Žilina. Taiwo's first competitive goal came in August versus Slovan Bratislava.

=== Dunajská Streda ===
In January 2019, Taiwo moved across Slovakia to DAC Dunajská Streda. A year later, after six goals for DAC, Taiwo returned to the Czech First League on loan with Karviná. He scored on his debut against Zlín on 15 February 2020.

=== Sønderjyske ===
On 19 August 2021, Taiwo joined Danish Superliga club Sønderjyske on a deal until June 2025. On 5 September 2022, it emerged that a rift had arisen between the management of Sønderjyske and Taiwo. As a result, he was sent down to the U19 team, but that decision didn't have the support of the first-team squad. Shortly after, he was back in the first team squad. On 6 September 2022, the club confirmed that Taiwo had left the club to join Slovak side FC Spartak Trnava on a loan deal for the 2022–23 season.

=== Spartak Trnava (loan) ===
In the summer of 2022, Taiwo transferred to Slovak club Spartak Trnava, where he initially got the opportunity mainly as a substitute player. He scored his first goal on October 2, 2022, against Zlaté Moravce, where his goal set a 3–0 victory for Spartak. However, he scored only three goals in the fall. He began to do much better in the spring, when his performances gradually earned him a place in the starting line-up and became one of the mainstays of the team. Taiwo managed to score up to 11 goals in 10 matches and thus became the fourth best scorer of Fortuna League 2022/23 with 14 goals. In his final match on May 20, 2023, at home against MŠK Žilina, he scored his first hat trick, which took 52 minutes.

He played 27 matches for Spartak and scored 19 goals, one of which was the equalizer in the Slovak Cup final against Slovan Bratislava.

=== Riga ===
On 17 July 2023, Taiwo joined Latvian side Riga FC. He scored a brace on his debut for the Latvian club in a 6–0 league win against FK Tukums.

=== Loan to FK Auda ===
Following little game time, Taiwo joined fellow league outfit FK Auda in 2024. He scored a goal for Auda in a 2–0 win in the Conference League against Cliftonville F.C., knocking out the Northern Irish club 4–1 on aggregate.

=== Return to Spartak ===
On 6 September 2025, on the deadline day of the transfer window, it was announced that Taiwo would be returning to FC Spartak Trnava on a loan with an option to buy. He said in an interview with Spartak that Riga had accepted the loan deal 12 minutes before the deadline, which is also the number he wore at his previous loan. Taiwo made his debut for Spartak in a 4–0 away win against MFK Skalica. In the 29th minute, Trnava doubled their lead. After a quick break, Azango pushed Holík to the right and his precise cross was directed into the net by Taiwo, who scored his second debut goal in the Trnava jersey. Taiwo's debut didn't even last a full half, as he had to be substituted early in the 43rd minute due to an injury. On 2 November 2025, Taiwo scored a hat-trick in a 4–0 win against AS Trenčín, and also won the Man of the Match.

== International career ==
In June 2016, Taiwo was selected for the Nigeria U23s' provisional squad ahead of the 2016 Summer Olympics. However, he wasn't picked in Samson Siasia's final selection. Taiwo did represent the U23s at the 2016 Suwon Invitational Tournament a month prior.

== Career statistics ==
As of 23 June 2020

Appearances and goals by club, season and competition
Club	Season	League			Cup		Continental		Other		Total	
Club	Season	Division	Apps	Goals	Apps	Goals	Apps	Goals	Apps	Goals	Apps	Goals
Bursaspor	2016–17	Süper Lig	0	0	0	0	—		0	0	0	0
FC Zbrojovka Brno	2017–18	Czech First League	0	0	0	0	—		0	0	0	0
Nitra	2018–19	Slovak Super Liga	18	3	0	0	—		0	0	18	3
DAC Dunajská Streda	2018–19	Slovak Super Liga	9	4	0	0	—		0	0	9	4
DAC Dunajská Streda	2019–20	Slovak Super Liga	9	2	1	0	2 (Note: Appearance(s) in the UEFA Europa League)	0	0	0	12	2
DAC Dunajská Streda	Total		18	6	1	0	2	0	0	0	30	6
Karviná (loan)	2019–20	Czech First League	12	3	0	0	—		0	0	12	3
Career total			49	13	1	0	2	0	0	0	52	13

== Honours ==
Spartak Trnava

- Slovak Cup: 2022–23
