= Patrik Vasiľ =

Slovak footballer (born 2004)

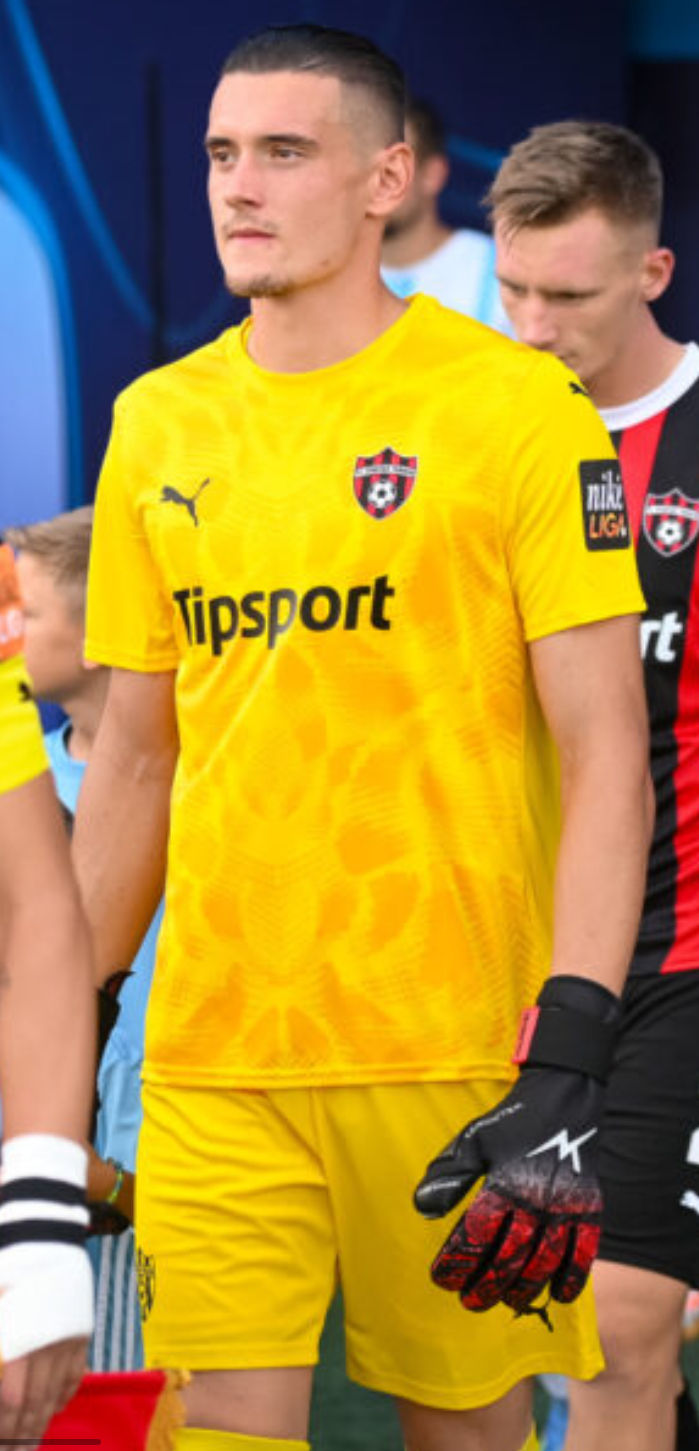
- Vasiľ on his debut for Spartak

Personal information
- Date of birth: 5 December 2004 (age 21)
- Place of birth: Vranov nad Topľou, Slovakia
- Height: 1.90 m (6 ft 3 in)
- Position: Goalkeeper

Team information
- Current team: Zlaté Moravce (on loan from Spartak Trnava)
- Number: 41

Youth career
- 2014–2017: Vranov nad Topľou
- 2017–2018: Nitra
- 2018–2023: Spartak Trnava

Senior career*
| Years | Team | Apps | (Gls) |
| 2023– | Spartak Trnava | 0 | (0) |
| 2023–2025 | → Dynamo Malženice (loan) | 37 | (0) |
| 2026– | → Zlaté Moravce (loan) | 15 | (0) |

International career
- Slovakia U18
- Slovakia U19
- Slovakia U20
- * Club domestic league appearances and goals as of 31 October 2026

Patrik Vasiľ (born 5 December 2004) is a Slovak professional football player who currently plays as a goalkeeper for Zlaté Moravce, on loan from Spartak Trnava.

He spent 2 seasons on loan at Spartak Trnava's feeder club OFK Malženice.

== Early life ==
Vasiľ is a native of Vranov nad Topľou. He started playing football at the age of 6 in the academy of the local club, MFK Vranov nad Topľou.

== Club career ==
=== Spartak Trnava ===
Vasiľ is a product of Spartak Trnava youth academy. In 2020, he went on trial to English club Manchester United. Vasiľ started training with the A-team at the age of only 15 years old. He signed his first professional contract with the club on 15 November 2024, alongside Patrick Karhan. Vasil’ played his first game for Spartak Trnava in a winter friendly against FC ViOn Zlaté Moravce.

==== Dynamo Malženice (loan) ====
In 2023, Vasiľ went on loan to Spartak’s feeder club, OFK Dynamo Malženice. He played a total of 37 games in 2 years. His loan was considered successful, impressing with his performances at the club.

=== Return to Spartak Trnava ===
After his loan with Malženice finished, Vasiľ returned to Spartak Trnava, where he would be a part of the squad for the upcoming season. He made his official debut for Spartak in the second round of the Slovak Cup against AC Nitra. He would concede a goal after a shot that was deflected by a defender, however the goal would only be a consolation for Nitra, as they lost the game 4–1.

== International career ==
He has played and been nominated for the Slovak U18,U19 and U20 teams.
