= Hilary Gong =

Nigerian footballer

Personal information
- Full name: Hilary Chukwah Gong
- Date of birth: 10 October 1998 (age 28)
- Place of birth: Zawan, Nigeria
- Height: 1.69 m (5 ft 7 in)
- Position: Winger

Youth career
- –2017: GBS Academy

Senior career*
Years	Team	Apps	(Gls)
2017–2018	AS Trenčín	32	(10)
2018–2022	Vitesse Arnhem	16	(0)
2022	Haugesund	12	(1)
2023	GBS Academy		
2023	→ Ararat-Armenia (loan)	10	(0)
2023–2024	AS Trenčín	31	(5)
2024–2025	Widzew Łódź	18	(0)
2025–2026	Spartak Trnava	18	(6)
- * Club domestic league appearances and goals as of 12 September 2026

Hilary Chukwah Gong (born 10 October 1998) is a Nigerian professional footballer who plays as winger for Slovak club Spartak Trnava.

== Club career ==
Gong made his professional debut for AS Trenčín against Ružomberok on 22 April 2017.

On 5 July 2018, Gong joined Dutch side Vitesse Arnhem on a four-year deal for an undisclosed fee.

On 15 July 2023, Ararat-Armenia announced that Gong's loan deal from GBS Academy had expired.

On 29 July 2023, AS Trenčín announced the return of Gong to the club.

On 11 July 2024, Gong moved to Polish Ekstraklasa club Widzew Łódź for an undisclosed fee, on a deal until June 2026, with a one-year option.

On 24 June 2025, it was announced that Gong would be joining Slovak club Spartak Trnava on a two-year contract with an option for another year. He made his debut for Spartak in the first round of the UEFA Europa League qualification in a 1–0 loss to BK Häcken, coming on as a substitute for Libor Holík in the 86th minute.

== Career statistics ==
As of match played 22 February 2025.

Appearances and goals by club, season and competition
Club	Season	League			National cup (Note: Includes Slovak Cup, KNVB Cup, Norwegian Cup, Polish Cup)		Europe		Other		Total	
Club	Season	Division	Apps	Goals	Apps	Goals	Apps	Goals	Apps	Goals	Apps	Goals
Trenčín	2016–17	Fortuna Liga	2	1	0	0	0	0	—		2	1
Trenčín	2017–18	Fortuna Liga	30	9	2	0	4 (Note: Appearances in UEFA Europa League)	2	—		36	11
Trenčín	Total		32	10	2	0	4	2	—		38	12
Vitesse	2018–19	Eredivisie	6	0	2	0	3	0	—		11	0
Vitesse	2019–20	Eredivisie	1	0	0	0	—		—		1	0
Vitesse	2020–21	Eredivisie	7	0	1	0	—		—		8	0
Vitesse	2021–22	Eredivisie	2	0	0	0	0	0	—		2	0
Vitesse	Total		16	0	3	0	3	0	—		22	0
Haugesund	2022	Eliteserien	12	1	2	0	—		—		14	1
Ararat-Armenia (loan)	2022–23	Armenian Premier League	10	0	0	0	0	0	—		10	0
Trenčín	2023–24	Fortuna Liga	31	5	3	1	—		—		34	6
Widzew Łódź	2024–25	Ekstraklasa	18	0	1	0	—		—		19	0
Spartak Trnava	2025–26	Niké liga	0	0	0	0	0+2	0	—		0	0
Career total			119	16	11	1	7+2	2	—		137	19
