= Giorgi Moistsrapishvili =

Georgian footballer (born 2001)

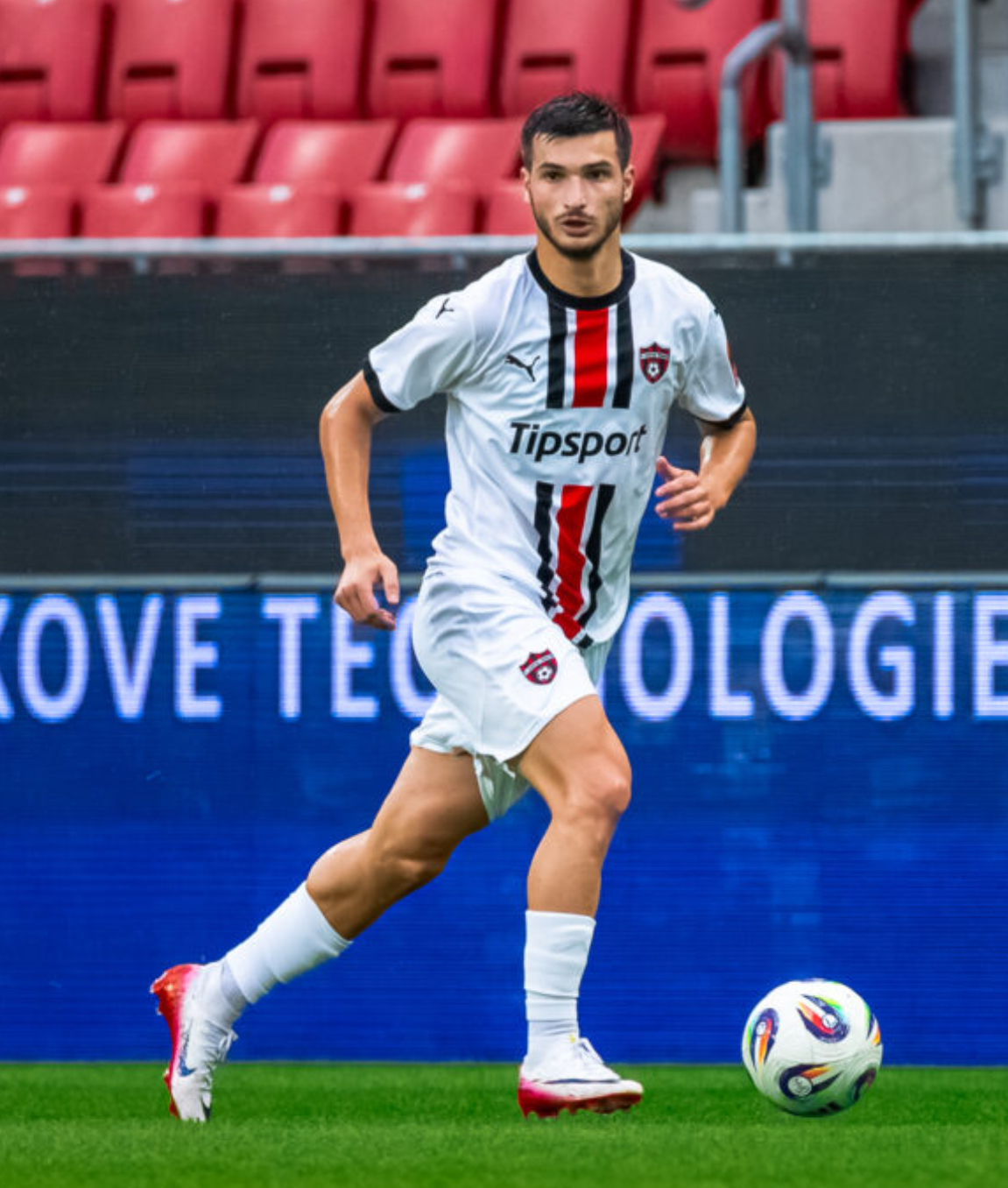
- Moistsrapishvili with Spartak Trnava in 2025

Personal information
- Date of birth: 29 September 2001 (age 25)
- Place of birth: Poti, Georgia
- Height: 1.83 m (6 ft 0 in)
- Position: Midfielder

Team information
- Current team: Spartak Trnava
- Number: 8

Youth career
- –2019: Dinamo Tbilisi

Senior career*
Years	Team	Apps	(Gls)
2020–2022	Dinamo Tbilisi II	0	(0)
2020	→ Telavi (loan)	10	(1)
2021–2024	Dinamo Tbilisi	78	(14)
2023–2024	→ Beveren (loan)	9	(0)
2024	Kolos Kovalivka	0	(0)
2025	Kolkheti 1913	17	(1)
2025–	Spartak Trnava	32	(0)

International career^{‡}
2019–2020	Georgia U19	11	(3)
2021–2023	Georgia U21	12	(3)
2026–	Georgia	1	(0)
- * Club domestic league appearances and goals as of 21 November 2026 ‡ National team caps and goals as of 18 November 2026

Giorgi Moistsrapishvili (Georgian: გიორგი მოისწრაფიშვილი; born 29 September 2001) is a Georgian professional footballer who plays as an attacking midfielder for Slovak First League club FC Spartak Trnava and the Georgia national team.

== Club career ==
=== Early career ===
Moistrsapishvili started his youth career at Dinamo Tbilisi, the most successful club in Georgian history, In 2020, Moistrsapishvili joined fellow Erovnuli Liga team FC Telavi. Moistrsapishvili made his senior debut for Telavi in 2020 while on loan there, in a 1–1 draw against FC Locomotive Tbilisi, coming on as a 69th-minute substitute for Tsotne Mosiashvili.

During his loan spell there he would record one goal in 12 appearances in all competitions, the winner in a 2–1 win over Chikhura Sachkhere in November 2020.

=== Dinamo Tbilisi ===
When he returned to Dinamo Tbilisi he finally broke into the first team and made his debut in February 2021 in a 1–1 draw against Samgurali coming on as a 79th-minute substitute for Anzor Mekvabishvili. He had to wait until September of that year though to score his first goal for the club and after many substitute appearances, he netted the fifth in a 5–1 win over Samtredia. Overall that season he made 13 appearances, scoring 2 goals.

After being forced to play a bit part role for Dinamo in the 2021 season, the next season Moistsrapishvili established himself as a regular starter under new manager Giorgi Tchiabrishvili. Moistsrapishvili scored 7 goals and recorded 8 assists to help the side to the league title, gaining attention from top European teams such as Sassuolo.

On 5 September 2023, Moistsrapishvili joined Challenger Pro League club Beveren on a season-long loan with the option to make the transfer permanent. The loan was terminated early in March 2024.

=== Kolkheti 1913 ===
In December 2024, Moistsrapishvili's hometown club Kolkheti 1913 announced his transfer on a three-year deal. He played 17 league games for the club in which he scored one goal.

=== Spartak Trnava ===
==== 2025–26 season ====
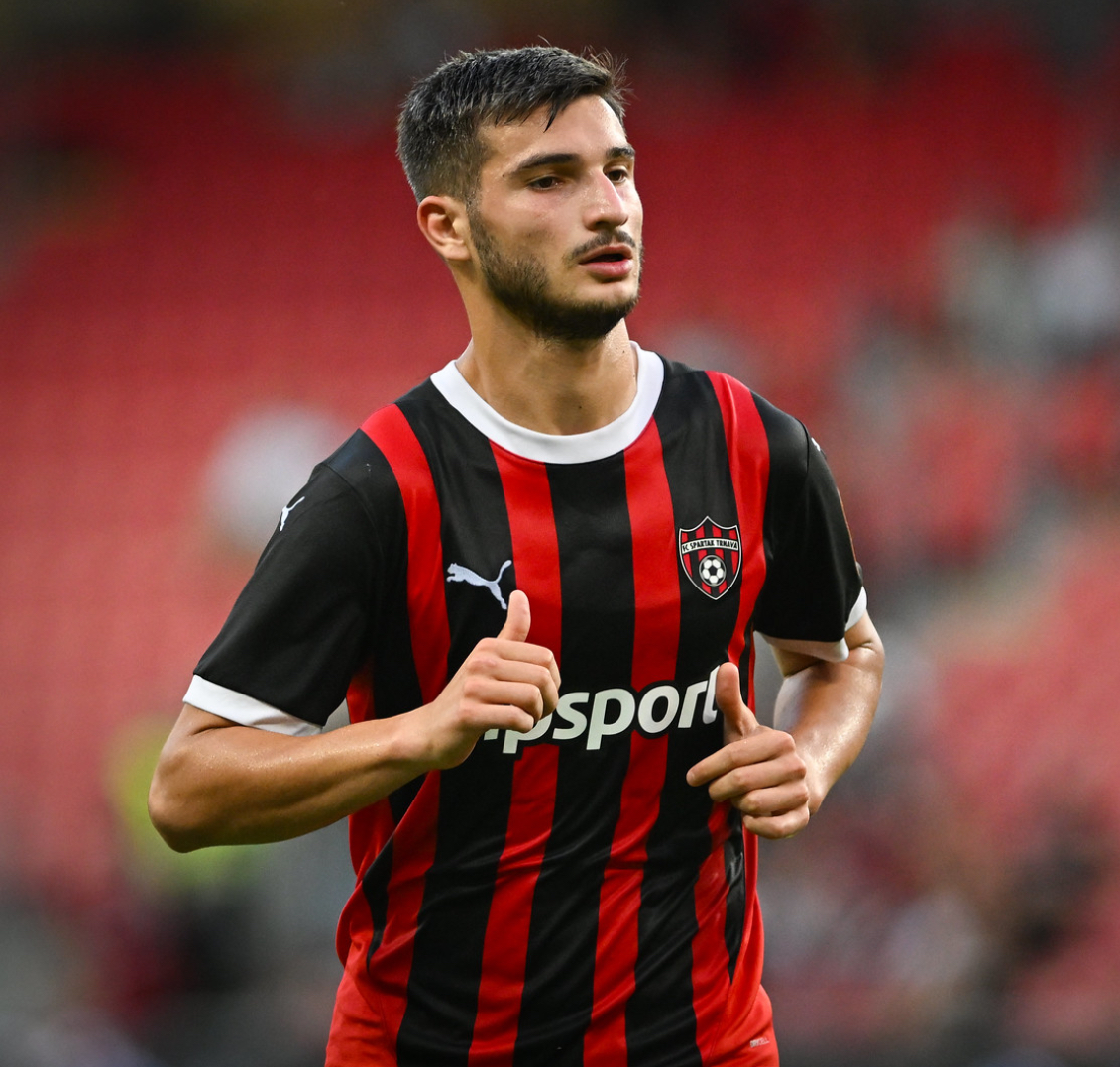
Moistsrapishvili playing against Tatran Presov.

On 25 June 2025, it was announced that Moistsrapishvili would be joining Slovak club FC Spartak Trnava on a 3-year contract. He made his debut for the club coming on as a substitute for Miloš Kratochvíl in the 69th minute in the second leg of the Europa League qualifications against BK Häcken. Moistsrapishvili scored in the 82nd minute after a pass from Michal Ďuriš to make the score 2–1 for Spartak. He got his first start in a 3–0 win over MFK Ružomberok on 27 July 2025, impressing with his performance and assisting the 2nd goal scored by Philip Azango. After coming on as a substitute in the 61st minute against Universitatea Craiova, Moistsrapishvili was able to provide 3 assists in a 4–3 win. He was sent off in the 90+10th minute of a 2–1 loss against league newcomers 1. FC Tatran Prešov. Following injuries and the appointment of new coach Antonio Muñoz, Moistsrapishvili only played seven more games until the end of the season.

== International career ==
Moistsrapishvili has represented Georgia at two youth levels, U19 and U21. He scored 3 goals in 11 games for the under 19 side. Moistsrapishvili was selected for the 2023 UEFA European Under-21 Championship and was part of the side that topped Group A ahead of Portugal, Belgium and Netherlands, before being eliminated on penalties in the quarter-finals, with Moistsrapishvili scoring his penalty.

== Career statistics ==
=== Club ===
As of matches played 17 May 2026

Appearances and goals by club, season and competition
Club	Season	League			National cup		Continental		Other		Total	
Club	Season	Division	Apps	Goals	Apps	Goals	Apps	Goals	Apps	Goals	Apps	Goals
Telavi (loan)	2020	Erovnuli Liga	10	1	3	0	—		—		13	1
Dinamo Tbilisi	2021	Erovnuli Liga	13	2	0	0	—		—		13	2
Dinamo Tbilisi	2022	Erovnuli Liga	30	7	3	0	2 (Note: Appearances in UEFA Europa Conference League)	0	0	0	35	7
Dinamo Tbilisi	2023	Erovnuli Liga	17	4	1	0	3 (Note: 1 appearance in UEFA Champions League & 2 appearances in UEFA Europa Conference League)	0	0	0	18	4
Dinamo Tbilisi	2024	Erovnuli Liga	18	1	0	0	1 (Note: 1 appearance in UEFA Europa Conference League)	0	1 (Note: 1 appearance in Georgian Super Cup)	0	20	1
Beveren	2023–24	Challenger Pro League	9	0	2	0	—		—		11	0
Kolkheti 1913	2025	Erovnuli Liga	17	1	0	0	—		—		17	1
Spartak Trnava	2025-26	Slovak First Football League	20	0	3	0	5 (Note: 4 appearances in UEFA Europa Conference League & 1 appearance in UEFA Europa League)	1	0	0	28	1
Career total			134	16	12	0	13	1	1	0	151	17

=== International ===
As of match played 17 November 2026

Appearances and goals by national team and year
National team	Year	Apps	Goals
Georgia	2026	1	0
Total		1	0
