= Stefan Skrbo =

Austrian association footballer

Stefan Škrbo
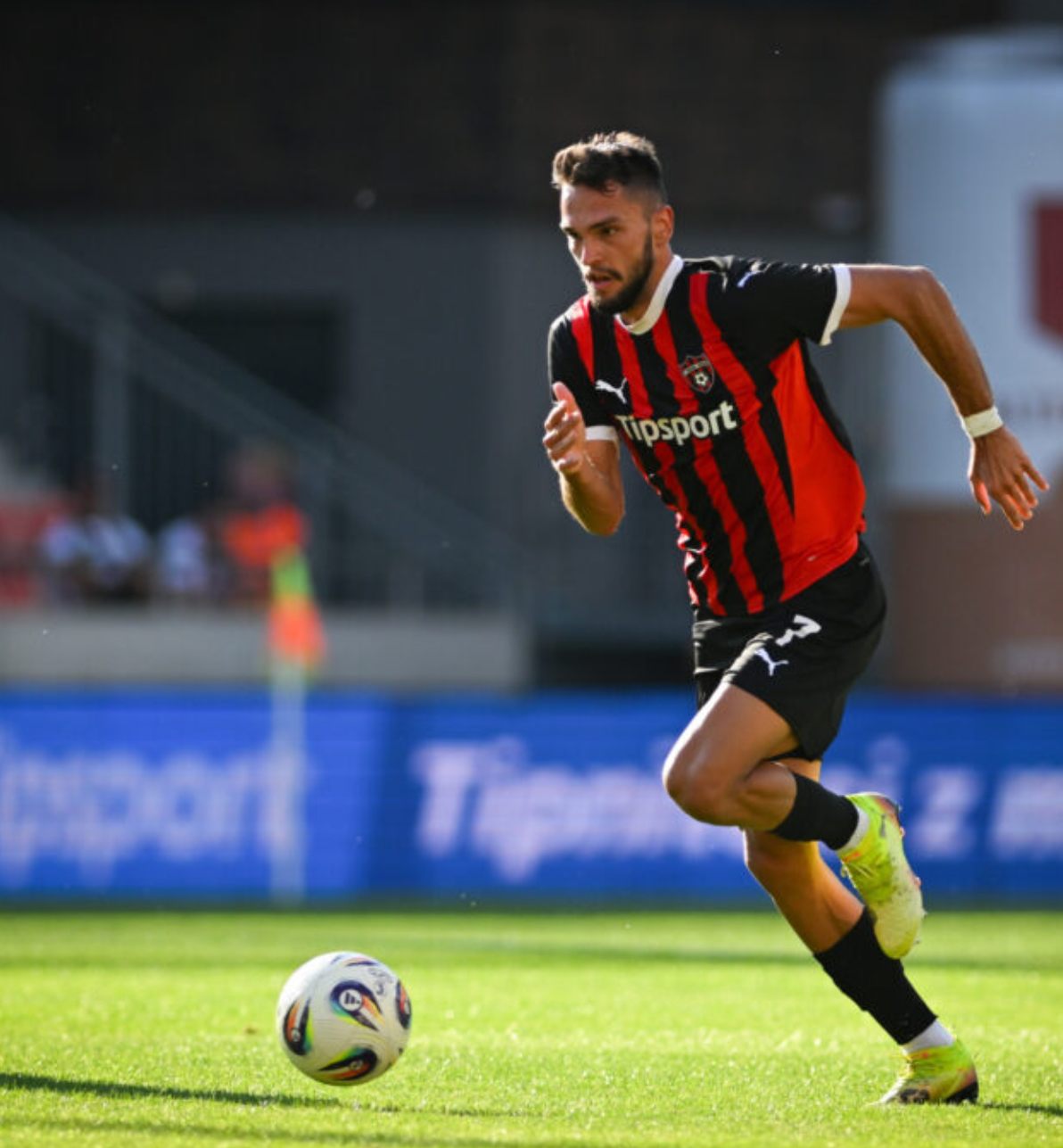
- Škrbo with Spartak Trnava in 2025

Personal information
- Date of birth: 23 January 2001 (age 25)
- Place of birth: Jenbach, Austria
- Height: 1.80 m (5 ft 11 in)
- Position: Winger

Team information
- Current team: Spartak Trnava
- Number: 7

Youth career
- 2006–2011: Jenbach
- 2011–2015: Schwaz
- 2015–2016: AKA Tirol
- 2016–2017: DFI Bad Aibling
- 2017–2018: WSG Tirol

Senior career*
Years	Team	Apps	(Gls)
2018–2019	WSG Tirol III	13	(8)
2018–2021	WSG Tirol II	49	(5)
2021–2025	WSG Tirol	66	(6)
2025–	Spartak Trnava	31	(2)

International career
2021	Austria U21	1	(0)
- * Club domestic league appearances and goals as of 21 November 2026

Stefan Škrbo (born 23 January 2001) is an Austrian professional footballer who plays as a winger for Spartak Trnava.

== Career ==
=== WSG Tirol ===
Skrbo is a product of the youth academies of Jenbach, Schwaz, AKA Tirol, DFI Bad Aibling and Tirol. He began his senior career with the reserves of Tirol in 2018. He was promoted to their senior team on 23 June 2021. He made his professional debut with Tirol in a 3–1 Austrian Football Bundesliga loss to FC Red Bull Salzburg on 11 September 2021.

=== Spartak Trnava ===
On 17 June 2025, it was announced by FC Spartak Trnava that the Austrian would be joining on a free transfer. He made his debut for Spartak in the first round of the Europa League qualification in a 1–0 loss to BK Häcken, coming on as a substitute in the 86th minute for Michal Ďuriš. He made his league debut in a 3–0 win over MFK Ružomberok, starting the match.

Škrbo scored his debut goal for Spartak in a 5–1 win over Hibernians F.C. on 31 July 2025, increasing the score line to 2–0 in Spartak's favour. He also assisted the 3rd goal scored by Michal Tomič. Škrbo scored his first league goals in a 4–1 win over KFC Komárno, netting in two goals.

== International career ==
Skrbo was a youth international for Austria, having represented the Austria U21s once in November 2021.

== Personal life ==
Škrbo was born in Austria, but his parents come from the Bosnian Serb part of Bosnia.
