= Filip Trello =

Slovak footballer (born 2007)

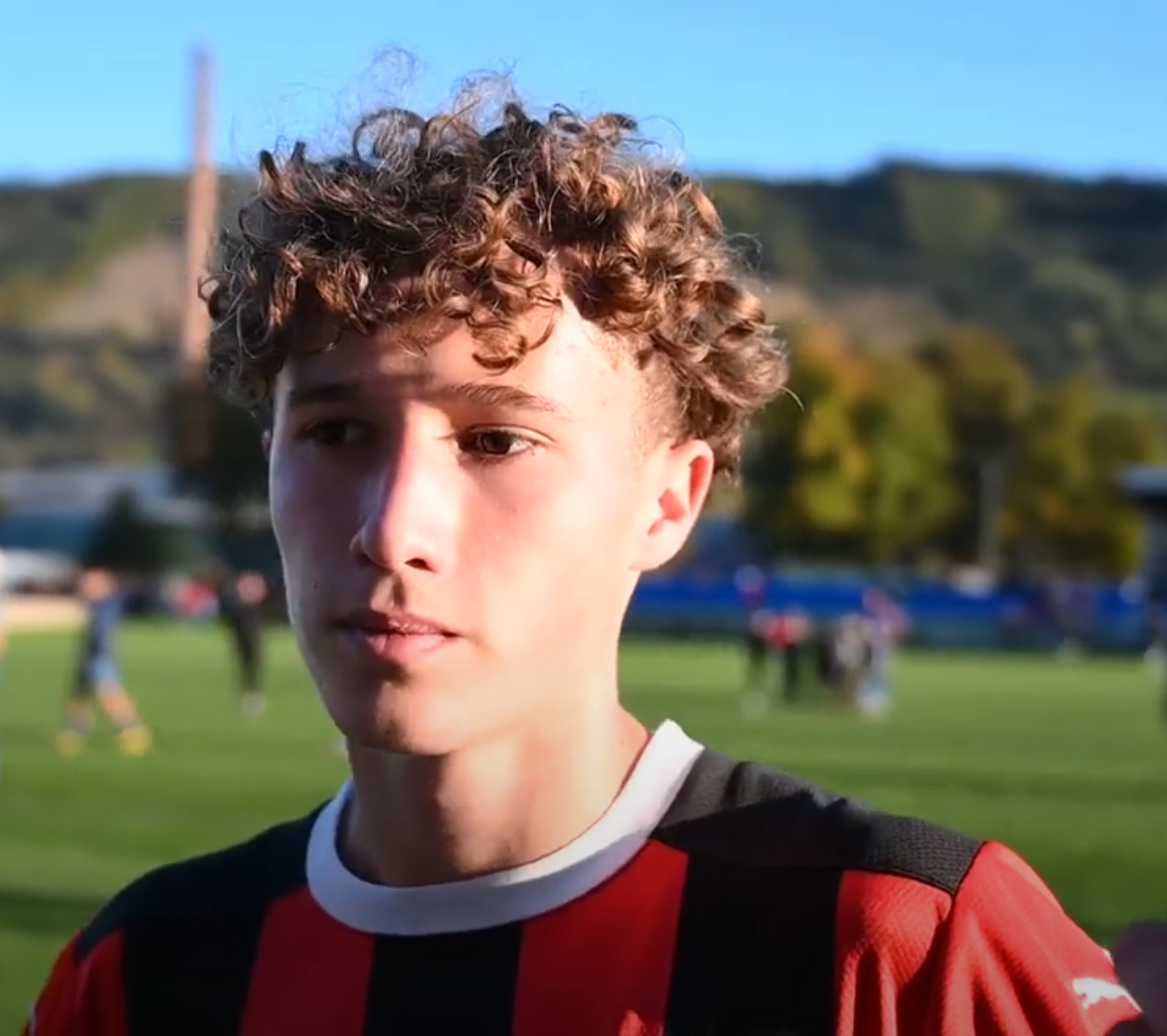
- Trello in 2024

Personal information
- Date of birth: 28 January 2007 (age 19)
- Place of birth: Slovakia
- Height: 1.78 m (5 ft 10 in)
- Position: Midfielder

Team information
- Current team: Spartak Trnava
- Number: 20

Youth career
- 2014–2024: Spartak Trnava

Senior career*
Years	Team	Apps	(Gls)
2024–	Spartak Trnava	17	(4)
2024–2026	→ Dynamo Malženice (loan)	48	(4)

International career^{‡}
2024–2025	Slovakia U17	10	(1)
2025–	Slovakia U18	5	(0)
2025–	Slovakia U19	7	(1)
- * Club domestic league appearances and goals as of 21 November 2026 ‡ National team caps and goals as of 17 September 2025

Filip Trello (born 28 January 2007) is a Slovak professional footballer who plays for Spartak Trnava and the Slovakia national under-19 team as a midfielder.

He has been described as one of the best talent in the recent years of the club by Spartak president Peter Macho.

In 2025, Trello won his first trophy, the Slovak Cup. He played 2 games out of the nine rounds, featuring on the bench in a 1–0 win against MFK Ružomberok in the final.

In 2024, Trello was a part of the U17 squad that would play in the 2024 UEFA European Under-17 Championship in Cyprus. He would play every game as Slovakia finished in last place in their group.

== Club career ==
=== Spartak Trnava ===
==== 2024–25 season: Professional debut ====
Trello is a product of the Spartak Trnava youth academy. On 16 July 2024, He signed his first professional contract with Spartak Trnava. Trello scored his first goal for Trnava in a 4–1 win against MFK Bytča in the 4th round of the 2024–25 Slovak Cup. He won the Anton Malatinsky Award for the best player under 19 years of age in December 2024. On 19 April 2025 he made his professional debut in a 2–3 loss against ŠK Slovan Bratislava coming off the bench as a substitute for Erik Sabo in the 75th minute. Trello made another appearance in the same season, coming on as a substitute in the 90th minute against Podbrezová. In 2025, Trello won the 2024–25 Slovak Cup with Spartak Trnava, featuring on the bench in the final where his team won 1–0 against MFK Ružomberok.

==== Loan to Dynamo Malženice ====
In July 2025, Trello joined Spartak’s feeder club Dynamo Malženice on a loan, joining alongside five other Spartak youth players. He scored his first goal for the club in a 3–1 loss against FC Petržalka, scoring in the 67th minute. Trello would be a part of the Spartak Trnava squad going to Turkey for their winter preparations.

== International career ==
In 2024, Trello was selected by the head coach of the Slovakia under-17 team, Branislav Fodrek, to be a part of the squad ahead of the 2024 UEFA European Under-17 Championship in Cyprus. He would play in the first game of the group stages, a 0–0 draw against Sweden, being subbed off in the 71st minute for Daniel Osman. Trello played in all group stage matches but would not be able to help his team qualify to the next round, as they finished on last place with only one point.

Trello was nominated for the Slovakia U–18 squad on 14 April 2025. He received his first call-up to the Slovakia national under-19 football team for preparation matches in Bulgaria.

== Career statistics ==
As of 27 May 2026

Appearances and goals by club, season and competition
Club	Season	League			Cup		League Cup		Europe		Total	
Club	Season	Division	Apps	Goals	Apps	Goals	Apps	Goals	Apps	Goals	Apps	Goals
Spartak Trnava	2024–25	Slovak First Football League	2	0	—		—		—		2	0
Dynamo Malženice (loan)	2025–26	Slovak 2. Liga	30	2	0	0	—			0	30	2
Career total			32	2	0	0	0	0	0	0	30	2

== Honours ==
Spartak Trnava

- Slovak Cup: 2024–25
