= Libor Holík =

Czech footballer (born 1998)

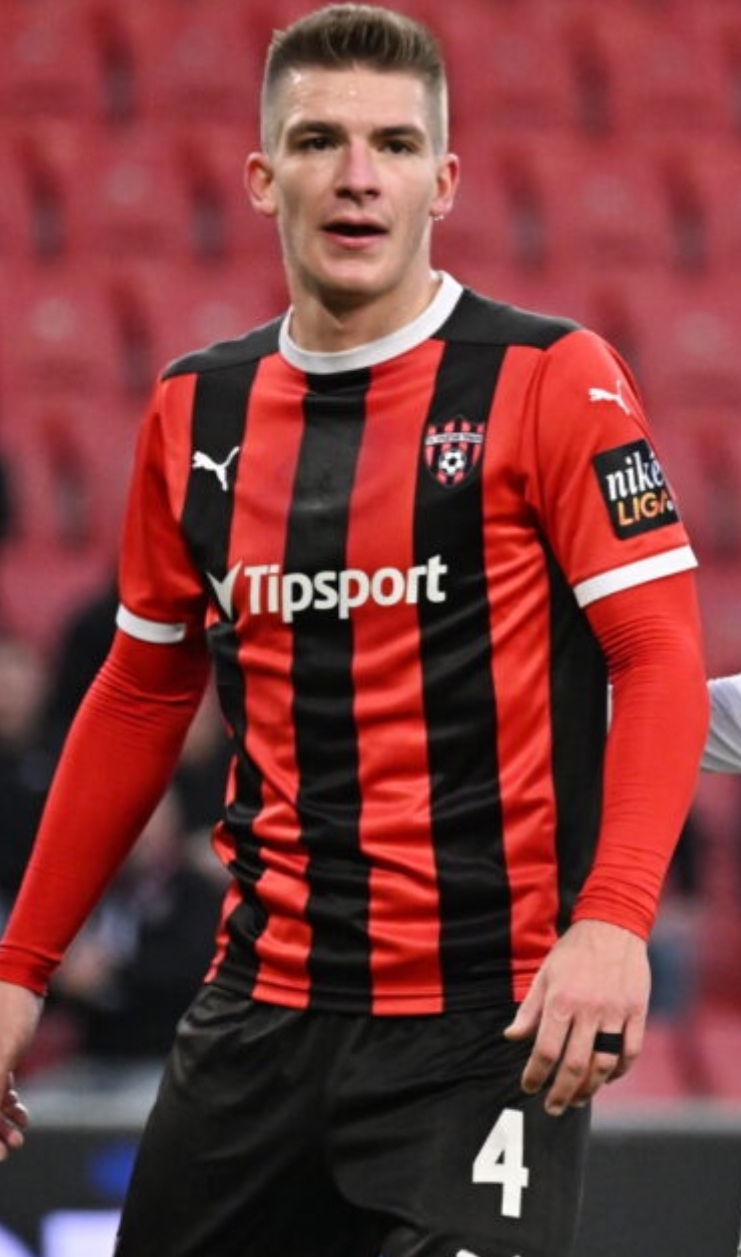
- Holík with Spartak Trnava in 2024

Personal information
- Date of birth: 12 May 1998 (age 28)
- Place of birth: Záhorovice, Czech Republic
- Height: 1.81 m (5 ft 11 in)
- Position: Right-back

Team information
- Current team: Spartak Trnava
- Number: 4

Youth career
- 2014–2015: Slovácko

Senior career*
Years	Team	Apps	(Gls)
2015–2017	Slavia Prague	1	(0)
2016–2017	→ Karviná (loan)	17	(1)
2017–2019	Zlín	28	(1)
2018	→ Vysočina Jihlava (loan)	6	(0)
2019–2022	Jablonec	45	(2)
2022	→ Viktoria Plzeň (loan)	25	(0)
2023–2024	Viktoria Plzeň	19	(0)
2024	→ Zlín (loan)	10	(0)
2024–	Spartak Trnava	58	(1)

International career
2014	Czech Republic U16	2	(0)
2015	Czech Republic U17	13	(0)
2015–2016	Czech Republic U18	9	(0)
2016–2017	Czech Republic U19	16	(1)
2016–2018	Czech Republic U20	9	(0)
2019–2021	Czech Republic U21	14	(1)
- * Club domestic league appearances and goals as of 21 November 2026

Libor Holík (born 12 May 1998) is a Czech professional footballer who plays for Slovak club Spartak Trnava as a right back.

== Club career ==
=== Slavia Prague ===
Holík is a graduate of Slovácko, in 2015 he moved to the junior teams of Slavia Prague. He made his debut for Slavia on 21 November 2015 against Slovácko, when he replaced Jaromír Zmrhal in the 90th minute. He only played for Slavia in the preliminary round of the Europa League, and for the 2016/17 season he went on loan to MFK Karviná. He also scored his first league goal in the Karviná jersey, when he secured a draw against Sparta Prague in the 82nd minute of the match of the 28th round.

=== Zlín ===
In the summer of 2017 Holik moved to Zlín. However, he did not play a single minute in the autumn and went on loan to Jihlava for the spring part of the season. He played the first six matches in Jihlava, after which he did not play again. In the 2018/19 season, he was a member of the Zlín starting lineup and played as a right defender, left and right midfielder, and several times played as an attacking midfielder.

=== Viktoria Plzeň ===
On 18 February 2022, Holík joined FC Viktoria Plzeň on a 6-month loan with an option to buy. In the following year he joined Plzen on a permanent deal.

=== Loan to Zlín ===
On 20 February 2024, he returned to FC Zlín on a 6-month loan.

=== Spartak Trnava ===
==== 2024-25 season ====
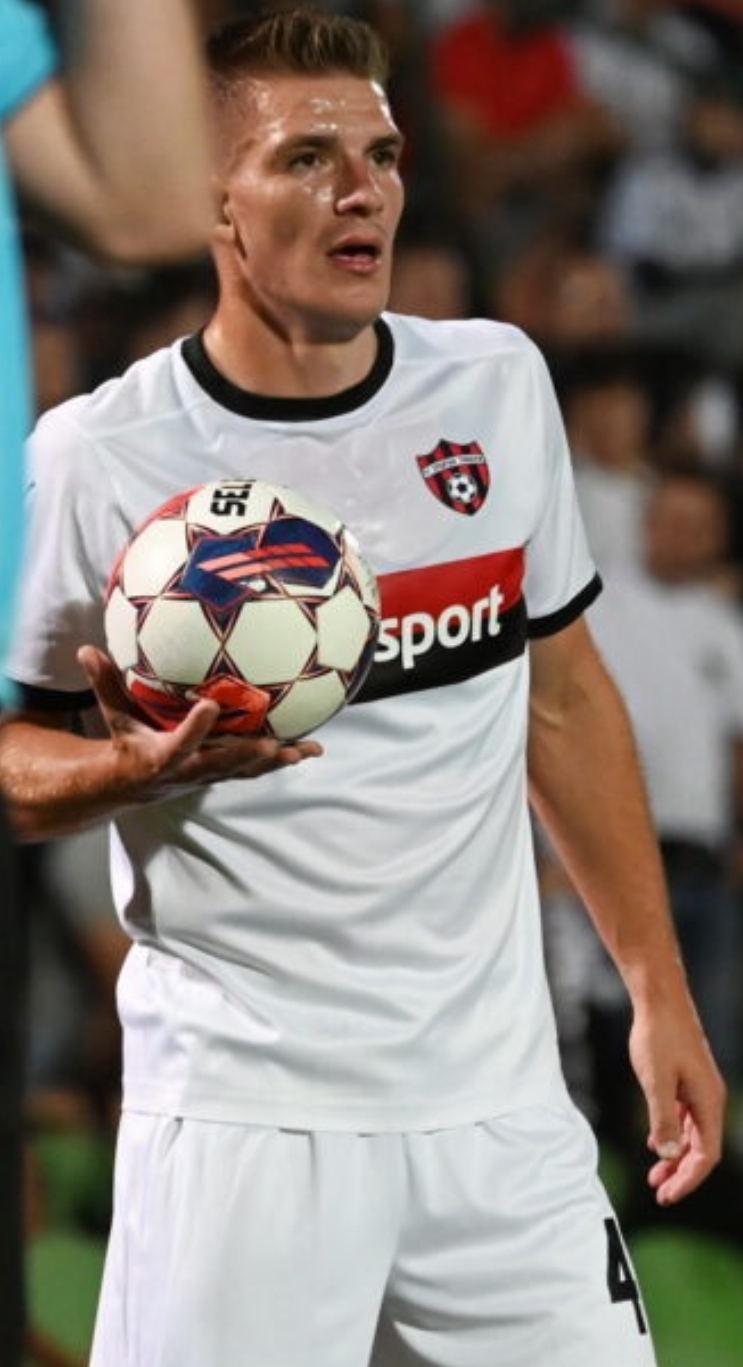
Holík in 2024

On 19 June 2024, Holík joined Slovak club Spartak Trnava, signing a 3-year contract. He made his debut for his new club in a 0–0 draw against FK Sarajevo in the 2nd round of the Conference League qualification. Holík would go on to make an appearance in every single league game throughout the season.

==== 2025-26 season ====
Holík scored his first goal for Spartak on 24 July 2025, in a Conference league match against Hibernians F.C., after a cross from outside the penalty box from Martin Mikovič. In the second leg, he scored and assisted a goal in a 5–1 win over the Maltese club. Holík scored his first league goal for his club in a 1–0 win over league newcomers Tatran Presov, scoring a header after a cross by teammate Miloš Kratochvíl. Holík won the Andel Roka (player of the year) award at Spartak.

== Honors ==
Viktoria Plzeň

- Czech First League: 2021–22

Spartak Trnava

- Slovak Cup: 2024–25
- Player of the year: 2025
