= OFK Dynamo Malženice =

Slovak football club

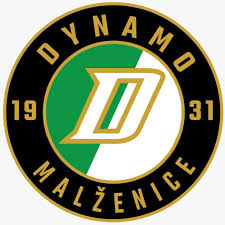
- Full name: OFK Dynamo Malženice
- Founded: 1931
- Ground: OFK Dynamo Malženice Stadium, Malženice
- Capacity: 993
- President: Peter Macho
- Head coach: Ján Škreňo
- League: 2. Liga
- 2025–26: 5th of 16
- Website: https://www.dynamomalzenice.sk/
Home colours	Away colours

OFK Dynamo Malženice is a Slovak football team, based in the town of Malženice. Since the 2021–2022 season, OFK Malženice has acted as a feeder club for FC Spartak Trnava.

== History ==
In 2023, Malženice won the 3. Liga. The club became the first team from a village to play in the 2. Liga. In the 2024-25 season, Malženice went on the best form in their history, being second for the majority of the season. They would eventually finish in 7th place. In the 2025–26 Slovak Cup, Malženice drew with 1st division club AS Trenčín in the 4th round. They lost the game by a score of 3–1, with Boris Druga scoring the only goal of the match.

=== Recent years ===
Season	League	Position
2012-13	7. Liga	Winners
2013-14	6. Liga	Winners
2014-15	5. Liga	Winners
2017-18	4. Liga	Winners
2022-23	3. Liga	Winners
2024-25	2. Liga	7th

== Notable players ==
For the full list see:Category:OFK Dynamo Malženice players

- Miroslav Karhan
- Cléber (footballer, born 1986)
- Dávid Bukovský
- Miha Kompan Breznik
- Ricardo Peña (Costa Rican footballer)
- Oliver Burian
- Azeez Oseni
- Filip Trello

== Current squad ==
As of 21 July 2026

Note: Flags indicate national team as defined under FIFA eligibility rules; some limited exceptions apply. Players may hold more than one non-FIFA nationality.

No.	Pos.	Nation	Player
3	DF	UKR	Oleksandr Ushchenko
4	DF	ARG	Nicolás Gorosito
5	DF	SVK	Martin Turansky
6	MF	SVK	Tomáš Šarmír
8	MF	BRA	Arthur Legnani
10	MF	SVK	Adrian Mojžiš
15	MF	BRA	Thiago Gaúcho
17	DF	SVK	Nicolas Kurej
19	DF	SVK	Jakub Krajčovič
27	MF	SVK	Alexander Horvát

No.	Pos.	Nation	Player
31	GK	SVK	Martin Chudý
70	MF	SVK	Mario Henyig
99	FW	SVK	Marek Fábry
—	DF	SVK	Michal Boledovič
—	MF	BRA	João Gabriel
—	MF	SVK	Samuel Ptacin
—	MF	SVK	Jakub Lezak
—	MF	SVK	Michal Farkas
—	FW	SVK	Patrik Priecel
—	FW	SVK	Juraj Duchovic
—	GK	CZE	Matyáš Šilhavý (on loan from Viktoria Plzeň B)
—	FW	SVK	Boris Druga

For recent transfers, see List of Slovak football transfers summer 2024.

== Colours ==
Club colours are green and white.
