= Philip Azango =

Nigerian footballer (born 1997)

Personal information
- Full name: Philip Elayo Azango
- Date of birth: 21 May 1997 (age 29)
- Place of birth: Jos, Nigeria
- Height: 1.67 m (5 ft 6 in)
- Position: Winger

Team information
- Current team: Spartak Trnava
- Number: 11

Youth career
- GBS Academy

Senior career*
Years	Team	Apps	(Gls)
2015–2016	→ Nasarawa United (loan)	15	(2)
2017	→ Plateau United (loan)	16	(2)
2017–2018	AS Trenčín	26	(3)
2018–2020	Gent	1	(0)
2020–2023	AS Trenčín	46	(12)
2023–	Spartak Trnava	88	(19)
- * Club domestic league appearances and goals as of 21 November 2026

Philip Elayo Azango (born 21 May 1997) is a Nigerian professional footballer who plays as a winger for Slovak First Football League club Spartak Trnava.

== Club career ==
=== AS Trenčín ===
In September 2017, Azango signed a contract with Slovak club AS Trenčín, where he spent the next year of his playing career. Most of the time spent with Trenčín, he was the main player in the attacking line of the team, playing in 26 league games, in which he scored three goals. He also played in a 4–0 win against Feyenoord.

=== Gent ===
In August 2018, the Nigerian moved to the Belgian Gent, signing a three-year contract with the team. In two seasons, he played one match in the national championship for Gent, after which he returned to Trenčín.

=== Return to Trenčín ===
On 19 July 2020, Azango headed back to Trenčín.

=== Spartak Trnava ===
In January 2023, Azango signed a two-year contract with Spartak Trnava, effective from summer 2023.

In a 3–1 win over Polish side Wisła Kraków, Slovak teammate Roman Procházka had a shot that was blocked by a defender, the ball bounced to the edge of the penalty where it was met with Azango’s foot. His goal set the score line at 2–1.

Azango became a key player for Spartak, signing a two-year extension to his contract.

On 1 March 2025, Azango scored a goal from outside the penalty box in a 1–0 victory over Slovan Bratislava, the goal was later won the goal of the month and goal of the year.

== Honours ==
Spartak Trnava

- Slovak Cup: 2024–25

Individual

- Slovak Super Liga Team of the Season: 2021–22
