= Alojz Fandel =

Slovak footballer and coach

Personal information
- Date of birth: 27 July 1947 (age 79)
- Place of birth: Gáň, Czechoslovakia
- Position: Midfielder

Youth career
- –1996: Spartak Trnava

Senior career*
Years	Team	Apps	(Gls)
1966–1973	Spartak Trnava	100	(15)
1973–1974	Dukla Praha	35	(3)
1975–1979	Spartak Trnava	105	(6)
1979–1981	Slovan Hlohovec		

International career
	Czechoslovakia U23	2	(0)
- * Club domestic league appearances and goals

Alojz Fandel (born 27 July 1947) is a Slovak former professional football player and coach. He is best known for playing with FC Spartak Trnava during the late 1960s and 1970s in the Czechoslovak First League.

Fandel began his senior career with Spartak Trnava in 1966, where he contributed to the club's successful era, winning four Czechoslovak league titles in 1968, 1969, 1971, and 1972. Over his playing tenure, he amassed over 160 club appearances across all competitions, scoring 9 goals. His European experience featured 20 matches in tournaments such as the European Cup, UEFA Cup, and Cup Winners' Cup. At the international youth level, Fandel earned two caps for Czechoslovakia's U21 team. After retiring in 1981 following a brief spell at Slovan Hlohovec, Fandel transitioned into coaching, serving as an assistant to Ivan Hucko at Spartak Trnava in 2007. His contributions to Slovak football were recognized in January 2024 when he was inducted into Spartak Trnava's Hall of Fame.

== Early life ==
Fandel was born on 27 July 1947 in Gáň, a village in the Galanta district near Trnava. As a young boy, Fandel relocated to Trnava with his family, where they first settled on Hospodárska Street before moving to the Prednádražie neighborhood.

Fandel's entry into organized football occurred in Trnava during his early childhood. Although he initially engaged only in street games with local boys, his competitive career began relatively late at age 14, when he joined the youth team (žiakov) of Spartak Trnava in 1961. This opportunity arose through initial scouting by the team's coach, Mr. Hudek, a local barber who, during one of Fandel's visits for a haircut, inquired about his interest in the sport after other boys recommended him. Soon after his recruitment and official registration, Fandel competed in his first tournament, the Czechoslovak Youth Championships held in Přelouč in the Czech Republic. Under the preparation of Valér Švec, who later became Fandel's senior teammate at Spartak, the team faced over 30 competing squads and achieved fourth place overall.

== Club career ==
=== Spartak Trnava (1966–1973) ===
Fandel joined Spartak Trnava in 1966 at the age of 19, beginning his professional career as a midfielder during the club's golden era under coach Anton Malatinský. Initially positioned as a squad player, he made his breakthrough in the Czechoslovak First League in 1967. Over the next seven seasons until 1973, Fandel accumulated 100 league appearances, scoring 9 goals.

=== Later career ===
Fandel appeared in the UEFA Cup 1974–75 for Dukla Prague.

After he retired from playing, Fandel became a football manager. He led TJ SH Senica before resigning in 2001.
