= 2026–27 FC Spartak Trnava season =

104th season of FC Spartak Trnava

FC Spartak Trnava
2026–2027 season
- President: Peter Macho
- Manager: Antonio Muñoz
- Stadium: Anton Malatinský Stadium
- Niké Liga: –
- Slovak Cup: –
- Conference League qualification: –

The 2026–27 season will the 104th season in the history of FC Spartak Trnava, and the club's 24th consecutive season in Slovak First Football League. In addition to the domestic league, the team will be participating in the Slovak Cup and the UEFA Conference League.

== Transfers ==
=== Summer ===
==== In ====
Pos.	Player	Transferred from	Fee	Date	Source
MF	(Slovakia) Roman Begala	1. FC Tatran Prešov	Free	2 June 2026	

==== Out ====
Pos.	Player	Transferred to	Fee	Date	Source
GK	(Slovenia) Žiga Frelih	Free agent	Free	30 June 2026	
FW	(Slovakia) Michal Ďuriš	Dukla Banska Bystrica	Free	30 June 2026	
DF	(Czech Republic) Filip Twardzik	Free agent	Free	30 June 2026	

== Friendlies ==
=== Summer pre-season ===
Viktoria Plzeň (Czech Republic)	v	(Slovakia) Spartak Trnava
	Report

== Competition ==
Competition	First match	Last match	Starting round	Record							
Competition	First match	Last match	Starting round	Pld	W	D	L	GF	GA	GD	Win %
Slovak First Football League			Matchday 1	0	0	0	0	0	0	+0	—
Slovak Cup				0	0	0	0	0	0	+0	—
UEFA Conference League	10 July 2025		First qualifying round	0	0	0	0	0	0	+0	—
Total				0	0	0	0	0	0	+0	—

Source: Soccerway
