= Patrik Banovič =

Slovak footballer

Personal information
- Full name: Patrik Banovič
- Date of birth: 13 November 1991 (age 34)
- Place of birth: Trnava, Czechoslovakia
- Height: 1.86 m (6 ft 1 in)
- Position: Centre back

Team information
- Current team: Malženice

Youth career
- Lokomotíva Trnava
- Spartak Trnava

Senior career*
Years	Team	Apps	(Gls)
2010–2015	Spartak Trnava	22	(1)
2012	→ Dunajská Streda (loan)	17	(2)
2014	→ Dukla Banská Bystrica (loan)	6	(0)
2015–2016	Spartak Myjava	22	(0)
2018	Malženice	22	(0)
2018–2019	Zlaté Moravce	17	(0)
2019–2020	Malženice		
2020	FC Kosova	0	(0)
2020–	Malženice		
- * Club domestic league appearances and goals as of 21:24, 5 May 2019 (UTC)

Patrik Banovič (born 13 November 1991) is a Slovak footballer who plays as a centre back for OFK Malženice.

He is grandson of a famous former defender Kamil Majerník, who also played for Spartak Trnava.

== Club career ==
Banovič made his league debut for Trnava against Nitra on 24 March 2010.

In January 2019, Banovič moved back to OFK Malženice. He left the club in the winter 2020 to join Swiss club FC Kosova on a 1,5-year deal. However, due to the COVID-19 pandemic, he made no official appearances for the club. He then returned to Malženice in the summer 2020.
