= Michal Gašparík =

Michal Gašparík may refer to:

- Michal Gašparík (born 1959), former Slovak footballer
- Michal Gašparík (born 1981), former Slovak footballer, current football manager and the son of the above
