= Jozef Šuran =

Slovak football manager (born 1955)

Personal information
- Date of birth: January 30, 1955 (age 71)
- Place of birth: Modranka, Slovakia

Managerial career
- Years: Team
- 2001–2002: FK Matador Púchov
- 2002–2003: Slovakia (assistant)
- 2004–2005: MŠK Žilina (assistant)
- 2007: Spartak Trnava
- 2008–2010: FO ŠK Modranka
- 2010–2011: Spartak Trnava (assistant)
- 2011–2015: FO ŠK Modranka
- 2016–2017: ŠK Cífer

Jozef Šuran (born 30 January 1955) is a Slovak former football manager who was last in charge of 5. Liga side, ŠK Cífer. He is most known for his time at first league clubs Spartak Trnava, and MŠK Žilina.

== Managerial career ==
In 2001, Šuran managed Matador Púchov, where he experienced his greatest success, helping club get to the qualifications of the UEFA Cup. On 23 April 2003, while being the assistant manager of the Slovak national team, Šuran joined second division side, FC Nitra. He was sacked in September of the same year, leading the team to bottom of the table after 26 rounds. In 2004 he was the assistant manager to Ladislav Jurkemik in MŠK Žilina.

Following his tenure at MŠK Žilina, it was rumored that Šuran had received offers from Inter Bratislava and FC Spartak Trnava. In January 2007, it was announced that Šuran would be the new manager of fellow league outfit Spartak Trnava, signing a two-and-a-half year contract at the club. In just over four months, his side managed to get 15 points from nine matches, with five rounds remaining. On 9 May 2007, Šuran was sacked from his position at Trnava following a 2–1 league defeat against FC ViOn Zlaté Moravce. He was replaced by the coach of Spartak's youth team Ivan Hucko.

Šuran later managed ŠK Modranka before returning to Spartak Trnava as an assistant to Dušan Radolský. Following his time at Trnava, he rejoined Modranka in the summer of 2011. He then managed ŠK Cífer.

== Later life ==
In 2023, Šuran had a stroke directly behind the wheel while driving on the D1 highway. He survived after an ambulance was called and he was taken to a hospital.
