= Miroslav Svoboda (football coach) =

Slovak football coach

Personal information
- Date of birth: 1950 or 1951 (age 75–76)
- Place of birth: Czechoslovakia

Managerial career
- Years: Team
- 2001: ŠK Slovan Bratislava (caretaker)
- 2002: ŠK Slovan Bratislava (caretaker)
- 2003: FC Spartak Trnava

Miroslav Svoboda (born 1950 or 1951) is a Slovak football coach.

== Managerial career ==
Svoboda served as head coach of ŠK Slovan Bratislava in the 2001–02 season, leading the club for five league matches between the 14th and 18th games on an interim basis at the end of the first half of the season. In April 2002 he returned as interim head coach after the resignation of Ján Švehlík.

In September 2002, following a 0–1 loss against Slovan Bratislava, it was announced by MŠK SCP Ružomberok president that Svoboda would be appointed as the club's new manager, replacing Vladimír Rusnák. Despite signing a one-year contract, he wouldn’t manage the club.

Svoboda was appointed head coach of FC Spartak Trnava in July 2003, taking over from Jozef Adamec. After the fourth round of the Corgoň league, his team had accumulated only two points and had scored just two goals. It was expected that the assistant coach Vladimír Ekhardt would take over, but he broke his leg, and Svoboda was asked to remain with the team during his recovery. In the fifth round, Spartak defeated Dukla Banská Bystrica with a 4–0 score. From then on, Spartak went on a seven match unbeaten streak. After leading Trnava for the first 15 games of the 2003–04 Slovak Superliga, Svoboda left the club by mutual consent in November 2003, despite having signed a two-year contract in the summer.

In January 2004, Svoboda became the head coach of FK Rapid Bratislava. Despite training with the club throughout the winter, he did not sign a contract and Peter Fieber took over a month later.
