= David Polťák =

Slovak footballer (born 2008)

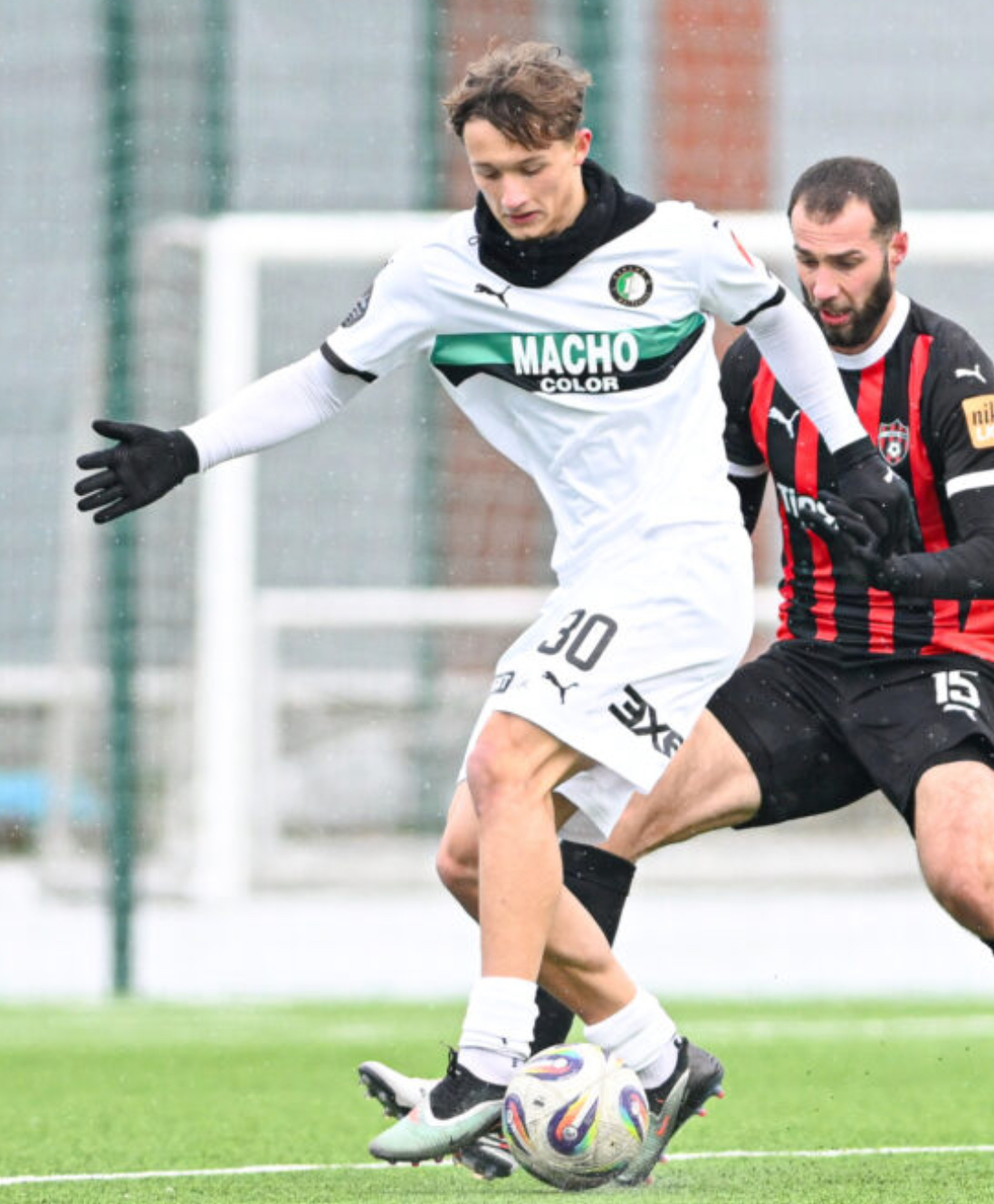
- Polťák (in white) playing with Dynamo Malženice in 2026

Personal information
- Date of birth: 9 September 2008 (age 18)
- Place of birth: Slovakia
- Height: 1.88 m (6 ft 2 in)
- Position: Forward

Team information
- Current team: Spartak Trnava
- Number: 97

Youth career
- 2015–2025: Spartak Trnava

Senior career*
Years	Team	Apps	(Gls)
2025–	Spartak Trnava	7	(2)
2025–2026	→ Dynamo Malženice (loan)	21	(6)

International career^{‡}
2022–2023	Slovakia U15	6	(1)
2023–2024	Slovakia U16	9	(2)
2024–	Slovakia U17	9	(7)
- * Club domestic league appearances and goals as of 21 November 2026 ‡ National team caps and goals as of 27 December 2025

David Polťák (born 9 September 2008) is a Slovak footballer who currently plays for Spartak Trnava as a forward.

From the youth team, Polťák went straight to the men's team where he would be loaned out to the second league Dynamo Malženice. In 2025, he was selected by Antonio Muñoz to join the A–team of Spartak Trnava to the winter preparation camp in Turkey.

== Club career ==
=== Spartak Trnava ===
==== Youth ====
On 16 July 2024, Polťák scored two goals in a 3–2 win over Wolverhampton Wanderers U17. On 20 February 2025, He signed his first professional contract with Spartak Trnava.

Polťák scored his first professional goal on his debut in a 2–1 win over 2. Liga champions Tatran Prešov, aged only 16 years old. In the 79th minute, Polťák replaced Tomáš Šarmír to make his debut in men's football. Two minutes later, Prešov equalized after a goal from Landing Sagna and had the upper hand in terms of numbers. However, Polťák would secure the win in extra time of the game, scoring after going one on one against the keeper.

==== Loan to Malženice ====
In July 2025, the next season, Polťák officially joined OFK Dynamo Malženice on a year-long loan. He scored his first goal for the club in a 2–1 league win against newly promoted club OFK Baník Lehota pod Vtáčnikom. Polťák scored the winning goal in a 2–1 win for Malženice against MŠK Žilina B. He was a part of the squad for Spartak Trnava for the winter preparations, where he impressed with his performances.

== International career ==
David Polťák currently plays for the Slovak U17 national team. He scored four goals in a 7–0 win over Gibraltar U17 on 1 November 2024. Polťák scored a double in a 4–2 win over Uzbekistan U17.

== Honours ==
Individual

- Best under-19 player: 2025

Spartak Trnava

- U17 Slovak league winners: 2024/25
