= Stanislav Jarábek =

Slovak footballer (born 1938)

Personal information
- Date of birth: 9 December 1938 (age 87)
- Place of birth: Suchá nad Parnou, Czechoslovakia
- Position: Centre back

Senior career*
Years	Team	Apps	(Gls)
1956–1971	Spartak Trnava	258	(12)

Managerial career
- Spartak Trnava B
- Žiar nad Hronom
- Sereď
- Senica
- 1983–1984: Banik Ostrava
- 1984–1985: Nitra
- 1985–1988: Spartak Trnava
- Banská Bystrica
- Slušovice
- 1992–1993: Nitra
- 1994: Kroměříž
- Drnovice
- Rimavská Sobota
- 1997–1998: Šaľa
- 1998–1999: Banská Bystrica
- 1999–2001: Slovan Bratislava
- 2001: Spartak Trnava
- 2003–2004: Spartak Trnava
- * Club domestic league appearances and goals

Stanislav Jarábek (born 9 December 1938) is a Slovak former football player and manager who played for Spartak Trnava. He played for Czechoslovakia on 1968 Summer Olympics in Mexico. He is the father of Juraj Jarábek.
