= Milan Malatinský =

Slovak footballer and manager

Personal information
- Full name: Milan Malatinský
- Date of birth: 8 February 1970
- Place of birth: Trnava, Czechoslovakia
- Date of death: 15 May 2018 (aged 48)
- Place of death: Czech Republic
- Position: Midfielder

Youth career
- Spartak Trnava

Senior career*
Years	Team	Apps	(Gls)
1988–1990	Spartak Trnava	50	(5)
1990–1991	Dukla Banská Bystrica	38	(7)
1992–1994	Spartak Trnava	79	(10)
1995–1997	Inter Bratislava	49	(6)
1997–2000	Banská Bystrica	53	(6)

International career
1994	Slovakia	2	(0)

Managerial career
- 2010: Spartak Trnava
- 2012–2018: Slovakia U18
- 2012–2018: Slovakia U19
- * Club domestic league appearances and goals

Milan Malatinský (8 February 1970 – 15 May 2018) was a Slovak football player and manager.

He played for Spartak Trnava, Dukla Banská Bystrica and Inter Bratislava. He was participant of 1989 FIFA World Youth Championship.

His uncle Anton Malatinský was a most successful manager of Spartak Trnava in history and the club stadium is named after him.
