= Majerník =

Majerník is a surname. Notable people with the surname include:

- Cyprián Majerník (1909–1945), Slovak painter
- Kamil Majerník (born 1943), Slovak footballer and manager
- Pavol Majerník (born 1978), Slovak footballer
- Peter Majerník (born 1978), Slovak footballer
