= Sean Devine =

English footballer

Personal information
- Full name: Sean Thomas Devine
- Date of birth: 6 September 1972 (age 54)
- Place of birth: Lewisham, England
- Height: 1.80 m (5 ft 11 in)
- Position: Striker

Youth career
- ?–1991: Millwall

Senior career*
Years	Team	Apps	(Gls)
1991–1992	Millwall	0	(0)
1992	→ Woking (loan)	?	(?)
1992–1994	Bromley	?	(?)
1994–1995	Fisher Athletic	?	(?)
1995	Anorthosis Famagusta	?	(?)
1995–1999	Barnet	126	(47)
1999	→ Wycombe Wanderers (loan)	7	(6)
1999–2003	Wycombe Wanderers	82	(36)
2003–2005	Exeter City	93	(39)
2005–2007	New Zealand Knights	7	(1)
2007–2008	Metro	?	(?)

International career
1998	Republic of Ireland B		

Managerial career
- 2013–2014: Canterbury United (assistant coach)
- 2014–2015: Canterbury United
- 2017–2018: Newtown FC (assistant coach)
- 2018–2019: Leighton Town (assistant coach)
- 2019–2020: Buckingham United
- * Club domestic league appearances and goals

Sean Thomas Devine (born 6 September 1972) is a retired professional footballer who played as a striker.

== Biography ==
He began his career with Millwall. Having spent time on loan with Woking in 1992, he spent two years with Bromley and one with Fisher Athletic before moving to Cyprus to play for Anorthosis Famagusta in the summer of 1995. Four months later, he returned to England and signed for Barnet.

Devine was Barnet's top scorer for three seasons and in 1996 he was offered a trial at Premiership club West Ham United. However, the high-profile transfer was cancelled after he was struck down by groin and hernia problems which kept him out of action for eight months. Devine had scored 16 goals before Christmas that season and he returned to fitness only after a rehabilitation spell at Lilleshall during the summer of 1997. Devine continued to score goals for Barnet and managed to break the club's league goalscoring record but an alleged fall-out with Bees Manager John Still brought an end to his future at Underhill.

In April 1999, after a successful loan spell at the club, Devine signed for Wycombe Wanderers for a fee of £200,000. He scored eight goals in 12 league appearances that season that made a major contributing factor to Wycombe's last day escape from relegation in the 1998–99 season. Devine also set a Wycombe club record for most goals in a single season by scoring 23 goals during the 1999–2000 campaign. However, a knee injury caused him to miss the whole of the 2000–01 season and after that he was unable to regain his old goalscoring form at the club. Devine stayed for two more years and went on to become Wycombe's all-time record Football League goalscorer, a record he had now achieved for two clubs. During the 2002–03 season, Devine began to fall out of favour with Wycombe manager Lawrie Sanchez and this led to the player requesting a transfer away from the club. Sanchez felt that Devine was no longer the same player since his injury and accepted a £70,000 offer from Exeter City, with the deal being concluded in January 2003.

In January 2005, Devine captained his Exeter side in an FA Cup third round match against Manchester United at Old Trafford, in which the non-league side secured a famous 0-0 result. After that season, Devine left England and signed for the New Zealand Knights making just seven appearances before club was dissolved in January 2007.

Devine also played as an Irish B international in a team that included Robbie Keane and Damien Duff in February 1998.
