= Juraj Jarábek =

Slovak footballer and manager

Personal information
- Full name: Juraj Jarábek
- Date of birth: 3 October 1962 (age 64)
- Place of birth: Trnava, Czechoslovakia
- Position: Defender

Team information
- Current team: Banská Bystrica (manager)

Youth career
- Spartak Trnava

Senior career*
Years	Team	Apps	(Gls)
1970–1981	Spartak Trnava	?	(?)
1981–1984	Sereď	?	(?)
1984–1986	Banská Bystrica	?	(?)
1986–1993	Senica	?	(?)
1993–1994	Breitennbrun	?	(?)
1994–1995	St. Pölten	?	(?)
1995–1996	Hanácká Slavia Kroměříž	?	(?)
1996–2000	Deutsch Wagram	?	(?)

Managerial career
- 2008: Jaslovské Bohunice
- 2009–2013: Zlaté Moravce
- 2013–2015: Spartak Trnava
- 2016: Dinamo Tbilisi
- 2016–2018: Zlaté Moravce
- 2019–2021: Karviná
- 2021–2022: Sereď
- 2022: Skalica
- 2023: Dečić
- 2023–2024: Karviná
- 2024–2025: OFK Malženice
- 2025–2026: Banská Bystrica
- * Club domestic league appearances and goals

Juraj Jarábek (born 3 October 1962) is a Slovak football manager and former player.

His father, Stanislav Jarábek, was also a footballer and manager.

== Career ==
He managed Zlaté Moravce since October 2009 until May 2013. In his first season as a manager, they achieved promotion from the second league into the top division. He managed Zlaté Moravce in top division for three further seasons, placing on 6th, 7th and 8th place respectively.

Spartak Trnava appointed him as a new manager in May 2013, before the start of the new season. They finished 3rd in his first season and 4th in second. He resigned in August 2015.

== Managerial statistics ==
As of 12 March 2024

Team	Nat	From	To	Record							
Team	Nat	From	To	P	W	D	L	GF	GA	GD	W%
Zlaté Moravce	(Slovakia)	5 October 2009	30 June 2013	105	36	28	41	120	126	−6	34.3
Spartak Trnava	(Slovakia)	1 July 2013	25 August 2015	90	42	21	27	141	104	+37	46.7
Dinamo Tbilisi	(Georgia (country))	27 January 2016	11 October 2016	32	19	5	8	52	31	+21	59.4
Zlaté Moravce	(Slovakia)	6 November 2016	5 November 2018	67	16	13	38	81	112	−31	23.9
Karviná	(Czech Republic)	14 November 2019	16 March 2021	42	10	15	17	46	62	−16	23.8
Sereď	(Slovakia)	1 July 2021	30 June 2022	34	11	9	14	37	47	−10	32.4
Skalica	(Slovakia)	1 July 2022	16 December 2022	22	7	7	8	27	30	−3	31.8
Dečić	(Montenegro)	19 March 2023	27 September 2023	20	7	7	6	26	25	+1	35.0
Karviná	(Czech Republic)	27 September 2023	12 March 2024	15	3	3	9	13	26	−13	20.0
Total				427	151	108	168	543	563	−20	35.4

== Honours ==
=== Manager ===
Zlaté Moravce

- DOXXbet liga (1): 2009–10 (Promoted)

Dinamo Tbilisi

- Umaglesi Liga (1): 2015-16
- Georgian Cup (1): 2015-16

Dukla Banská Bystrica

- MONACObet liga (1): 2025–26 (Promoted)
