= Jaroslav Kravárik =

Slovak footballer

Personal information
- Date of birth: 5 December 1941 (age 84)
- Place of birth: Piešťany, Slovak Republic
- Position: Midfielder

Senior career*
Years	Team	Apps	(Gls)
1962–1964	Tatran Prešov		
1964–1968	Spartak Trnava	81	(18)
1968–1971	Slavia Prague		

International career
1965	Czechoslovakia	1	(0)
- * Club domestic league appearances and goals

Jaroslav Kravárik (born 5 December 1941) is a Slovak former footballer who played as a midfielder.

== Career ==
Kravárik played with Czechoslovak First League outfits Tatran Prešov (1962–1964), Spartak Trnava (1964–1968) and Slavia Prague (1968–1971). With Spartak Trnava, he won the Czechoslovak Cup (1967) and the league championship (1968). In 1967 he scored the decisive goal in the 3–1 win of Spartak Trnava against Újpest Dósza in the second leg of the Mitropa Cup finals.

Kravárik played 81 matches and scored 18 goals with Spartak Trnava. Overall he played 142 Czechoslovak First League matches and scored 28 goals.

He played in one match for the Czechoslovakia national team in 1965, against Portugal.
