= Michal Gašparík (born 1956) =

Slovak football manager

Personal information
- Date of birth: 23 April 1956 (age 70)
- Place of birth: Šúrovce, Czechoslovakia
- Position: Winger

Youth career
- Spartak Trnava

Senior career*
Years	Team	Apps	(Gls)
1973–1979	Spartak Trnava	115	(21)
1980	Dukla Banská Bystrica	8	(1)
1980–1986	Spartak Trnava	143	(32)
1986–1987	AEL Limassol		

Managerial career
- 2017–2018: Sereď (assistant)
- 2018: Sereď
- * Club domestic league appearances and goals

Michal Gašparík (born 23 April 1956) is a Slovak former football player who played mostly for Spartak Trnava.

His son, Michal Gašparík, was also a footballer and is currently the manager of Górnik Zabrze.

== Club career ==
He scored his first league goal in the spring of 1975 at home to Škoda Plzeň and, together with Varadin, contributed to a 2:0 win. In the same year, he and his teammates enjoyed winning the Slovak Cup and the Czechoslovak Cup over Sparta Prague, where he contributed to the home win with a goal. In the European Cup, he scored five goals – two in a double match with FC Copenhagen and one against Belenenses. In the autumn, he played in a double match against Boavista.

In the Czechoslovak league Gašparík played for Spartak Trnava and Dukla Banská Bystrica, playing in 268 matches and scored 54 goals. He played in 2 matches in the Cup Winners' Cup. He played in 6 matches for the youth national team and in 8 matches for the junior national team and scored 1 goal. Winner of the Czechoslovak Cup in 1975 and 1986. Abroad he played in Cyprus for the AEL Limassol team.
