= Karol Pecze =

Slovak football manager (born 1946)

Personal information
- Full name: Karol Pecze
- Date of birth: 7 February 1946 (age 80)
- Place of birth: Košice, Czechoslovakia

Managerial career
- Years: Team
- 1976–1979: TSMB Trnávka
- 1979–1981: ZVL Žilina
- 1981–1983: Slovan Bratislava (assistant)
- 1983–1984: Slovan Bratislava
- 1984–1989: Dunajská Streda
- 1986–1988: Czechoslovakia U21 (assistant)
- 1989–1990: ETO Győr
- 1991–1992: Nitra
- 1992–1993: Wisla Krakow
- 1994–1997: Spartak Trnava
- 1997–1998: Košice
- 1998–2000: Gençlerbirliği
- 2000–2002: Çaykur Rizespor
- 2002–2004: Inter Bratislava
- 2004: Panionios
- 2005: Žilina
- 2006: Sivasspor
- 2008–2009: Spartak Trnava

Karol Pecze (born 7 February 1946) is a Slovak football manager.

He coached MŠK Žilina, Slovan Bratislava, FK DAC 1904 Dunajská Streda, Győri ETO FC, FC Nitra, Wisla Kraków, Spartak Trnava, 1. FC Košice, Gençlerbirliği, Çaykur Rizespor, Inter Bratislava, Panionios, Sivasspor.

== Honours ==
=== Manager ===
Slovan Bratislava

- Czechoslovak Cup (1): 1981-82
- Slovak Cup (2): 1982, 1983

DAC Dunajská Streda

- 1. SNL: Winners: 1984-85 (Promoted)
- Czechoslovak Cup (1): 1986-87
- Czechoslovak First League: Third place 1987-88

Spartak Trnava

- Slovak Cup: Runners-up: 1995-96
- Slovak Super Liga: Runners-up: 1996-97
