= Anton Hrušecký =

Slovak footballer (1942–2019)

Personal information
- Full name: Anton Hrušecký
- Date of birth: 2 January 1942
- Place of birth: Sereď, Slovakia
- Date of death: 18 June 2019 (aged 77)
- Place of death: Banská Bystrica, Slovakia
- Position: Midfielder

Senior career*
Years	Team	Apps	(Gls)
1964–1974	FC Spartak Trnava	277	(32)

International career
1972	Czechoslovakia	3	(1)
- * Club domestic league appearances and goals

Anton Hrušecký (2 January 1942 – 18 June 2019) was a former Slovak footballer, who played for FC Spartak Trnava. He earned 3 caps for the Czechoslovakia national football team.

== International career ==
Hrušecký made three appearances for the full Czechoslovakia national football team.
