= Justín Javorek =

Slovak footballer and coach (1936–2021)

Personal information
- Date of birth: 14 September 1936
- Place of birth: Voderady, Czechoslovakia
- Date of death: 15 September 2021 (aged 85)

Senior career*
Years	Team	Apps	(Gls)
-1958	Dukla Trenčín		
1958–1959	Tatran Prešov	26	(0)
1959–1969	Inter Bratislava	75	(0)
1969–1970	Mersin İdmanyurdu		

International career
1959-1960	Czechoslovakia	2	(0)

Managerial career
- -1980: Omonia Aradippou
- 1980-1982: Inter Bratislava
- 1982–1985: Spartak Trnava
- 1985–1986: Tatran Prešov
- 1987–1989: Dunajská Streda (Assistant)
- 1991: Altay
- 1991-1994: Galatasaray (Coordinator)
- 1994: Spartak Trnava
- * Club domestic league appearances and goals

Justín Javorek (14 September 1936 – 15 September 2021) was a Slovak football coach and goalkeeper for the Czechoslovakia national team.

Javorek had a brief stint managing Turkish side Altay S.K. in 1991.
