= Martin Vyskočil =

Czech footballer

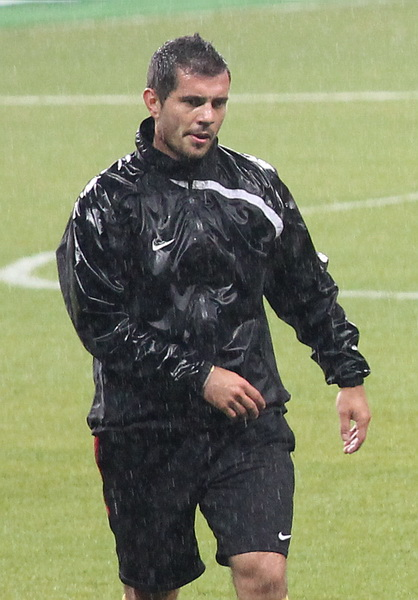

Personal information
- Full name: Martin Vyskočil
- Date of birth: 15 September 1982 (age 44)
- Place of birth: Olomouc, Czechoslovakia
- Height: 1.80 m (5 ft 11 in)
- Positions: Forward; winger

Youth career
- Sigma Olomouc

Senior career*
Years	Team	Apps	(Gls)
2001–2006	Sigma Olomouc	72	(4)
2005	→ České Budějovice (loan)	13	(1)
2006	Slovan Bratislava	17	(2)
2007–2009	Zlín	68	(6)
2009–2011	Žilina	26	(0)
2011	→ Tatran Prešov (loan)	14	(0)
2011–2015	Spartak Trnava	92	(20)
2013	→ České Budějovice (loan)	8	(2)
2015–2017	Frýdek-Místek	48	(10)

International career
2003	Czech Republic U21	4	(0)
- * Club domestic league appearances and goals

Martin Vyskočil (born 15 September 1982) is a Czech former footballer who played as a forward.

== Club career ==
Vyskočil was signed by Spartak Trnava in July 2011 and made his league debut for them against Dunajská Streda on 17 July 2011.

== Honours ==
Žilina

- Slovak Super Liga (1): 2010
- Slovak Super Cup (1): 2010
