= Marián Šarmír =

Slovak football manager

Personal information
- Date of birth: 1 May 1976 (age 50)
- Place of birth: Kaplna, Czechoslovakia

Team information
- Current team: Inter Bratislava (manager)

Managerial career
- Years: Team
- 2015–2017: Spartak Trnava B
- 2017–2018: Sereď
- 2019: FC Petržalka U19
- 2020: Spartak Trnava
- 2021–2022: Partizán Bardejov
- 2023–2024: Slovan Dušlo Šaľa
- 2024–2025: Rača
- 2025–2026: Inter Bratislava

Marián Šarmír (born 1 May 1976) is a Slovak football manager of 2nd league side FK Inter Bratislava.

== Managerial career ==
=== Early career ===
In 2017, Šamír joined ŠKF Sereď. He helped the club get promoted to the Slovak First Football League. He became the new manager of Slovak club FC Spartak Trnava on 11 June 2020. On 14 September 2020, it was announced that Šamír would be leaving his role of manager at Spartak Trnava after negative results. On 13 June 2021, it was announced that Šamír would become the new manager of 3. Liga club, Partizán Bardejov.

On 15 June 2025, it was announced that Šamír would be the new manager of newly promoted 2. Liga club FK Inter Bratislava.
