= Michal Ščasný =

Czech footballer and manager (born 1978)

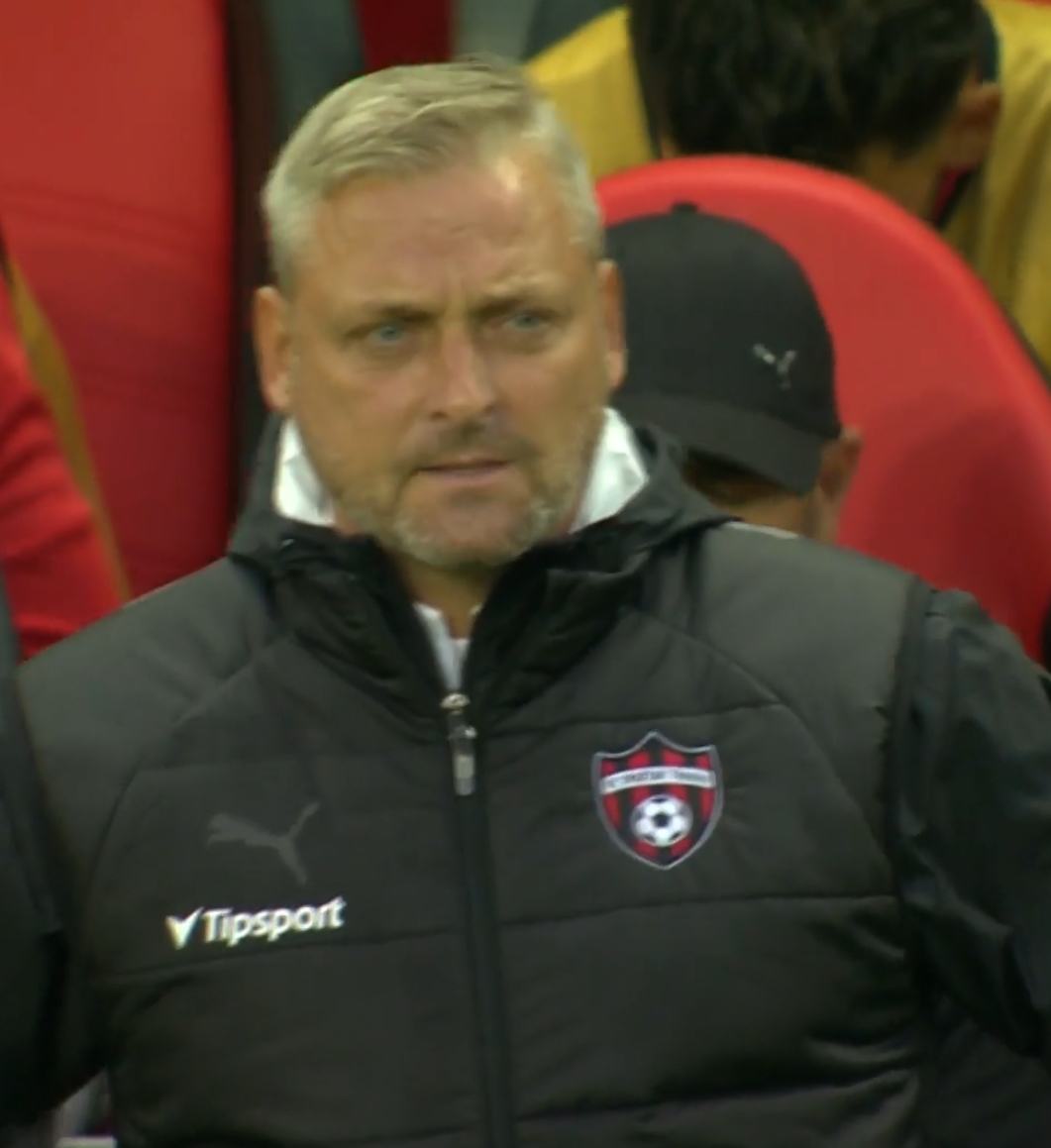
- Ščasny with Spartak Trnava in 2025

Personal information
- Date of birth: 19 August 1978 (age 48)
- Place of birth: Prague, Czechoslovakia
- Height: 1.78 m (5 ft 10 in)
- Positions: Defender; midfielder

Team information
- Current team: Ružomberok (head coach)

Youth career
- 1983–1988: Slovan Bohnice
- 1988–1990: Slušovice
- 1990–1992: Anagennisi Deryneia
- 1992–1994: Roudnice nad Labem

Senior career*
Years	Team	Apps	(Gls)
1994–1996	Roudnice nad Labem		
1996–1997	Ústí nad Labem		
1997–1998	Sparta Prague B	27	(1)
1998	Tatran Poštorná		
1998–2000	Sparta Prague	9	(1)
2001–2004	Viktoria Žižkov	110	(4)
2005–2006	Westerlo	17	(0)
2006–2008	Anagennisi Deryneia	22	(2)
2008–2010	Tatran Prešov	44	(0)
2010–2012	APEP		

Managerial career
- 2015–2018: Senica (assistant)
- 2018: Spartak Trnava (assistant)
- 2019: Spartak Trnava
- 2019–2020: Senica
- 2021: Nitra
- 2021–2022: Nitra
- 2022–2023: Dukla Banská Bystrica
- 2023–2024: Othellos Athienou
- 2024–2025: Žilina
- 2025: Spartak Trnava
- 2026–: Ružomberok
- * Club domestic league appearances and goals

Michal Ščasný (born 19 August 1978) is a Czech football manager and former player. He currently manage the Slovak side MFK Ružomberok.

== Managerial career ==
=== MŠK Žilina ===
On 11 April 2024, MŠK Žilina announced Ščasný as their new manager. For a large period of the season Žilina were in a title race with Slovan Bratislava, however due to bad form after the winter break, they dropped points and finished 2nd.

=== Spartak Trnava ===
On 6 June 2025, it was announced that Ščasný would be the new manager of Slovak First Division side FC Spartak Trnava, signing a 2 year contract. In his previous spell with the club he had won the Slovak Cup. Ščasný’s first game in charge would be a game against BK Häcken in the first round of the Europa League qualifications. His team lost the game 1–0 at home. On 18 November 2025, it was announced by the club the Ščasný had agreed to part ways with the club.

== Personal life ==
He is the son of Zdeněk Ščasný and the brother of Pavlína Ščasná.

== Managerial statistics ==
As of 9 November 2025

Managerial record by team and tenure
Team	From	To	Record							
Team	From	To	P	W	D	L	GF	GA	GD	Win %
Žilina	11 April 2024	30 June 2025	43	22	11	10	90	53	+37	51.16
Spartak Trnava	1 July 2025	18 November 2025	22	13	3	6	47	26	+21	59.09
Total			65	35	14	16	137	79	+58	53.85

== Honors ==
=== Player ===
Sparta Prague

- Czech First League: 1998–99, 1999–2000, 2000–01

=== Manager ===
Spartak Trnava

- Slovak Cup: 2018–19
