= Peter Zelenský =

Slovak footballer and manager

Personal information
- Full name: Peter Zelenský
- Date of birth: 27 November 1958 (age 67)
- Place of birth: Trnava, Czechoslovakia
- Position: Midfielder

Youth career
- Spartak Trnava

Senior career*
Years	Team	Apps	(Gls)
1975–1979	Spartak Trnava	81	(2)
1979–1981	Banská Bystrica	36	(5)
1981–1982	Spartak Trnava	29	(0)
1982–1988	Bohemians Prague	139	(6)
1988–1989	Gent	16	(5)
1989–1990	FC Chur 97	9	(0)

International career
1982–1985	Czechoslovakia	15	(0)

Managerial career
- 1997–1998: Dubnica
- 1999: Spartak Trnava
- 2000–2001: Spartak Trnava
- 2003–2005: Rimavská Sobota
- 2007: Dolný Kubín
- 2008: Liptovský Mikuláš
- 2009: Spartak Trnava
- 2010: Spartak Trnava
- 2011: Spartak Trnava
- 2012–2013: Spartak Trnava
- 2013–2014: Palárikovo
- 2014–2015: Spartak Trnava B
- 2017–2018: KFC Komárno
- 2018: Slovan Duslo Šaľa
- * Club domestic league appearances and goals

Peter Zelenský (born 27 November 1958) is a former Slovak football player and manager.

He played for Spartak Trnava and Bohemians Prague.

== International career ==
Zelenský made 15 appearances for the full Czechoslovakia national football team.
