= Antonio Muñoz =

Antonio Muñoz or Antonio Munoz may refer to:

- Antonio Muñoz (actor) (born 1966), Guatemalan actor and national motocross champion
- Antonio Munoz (American politician) (born 1964), Illinois State Senator
- Antonio Muñoz (architect) (1884–1960), Italian art historian and architect, restored the Torre delle Milizie
- Antonio Muñoz (baseball) (born 1949), Cuban baseball player
- Antonio Muñoz Degrain (1840–1924), Spanish painter
- Antonio Muñoz (footballer, born 1989), Spanish footballer and manager
- Antonio Muñoz Molina (born 1956), Spanish writer
- Antonio Muñoz (Spanish politician) (born 1959), mayor of Seville
- Antonio Muñoz (tennis) (born 1951), Spanish tennis player
- Toni Muñoz (footballer, born 1968), Spanish footballer
- Toni Muñoz (footballer, born 1982), Spanish footballer

== See also ==
- Antonio López Muñoz, 1st Count of López Muñoz, Spanish nobleman, writer and politician
- Antonio Marín Muñoz (born 1970), Spanish writer and historian
