= Anton Malatinský =

Slovak footballer and coach

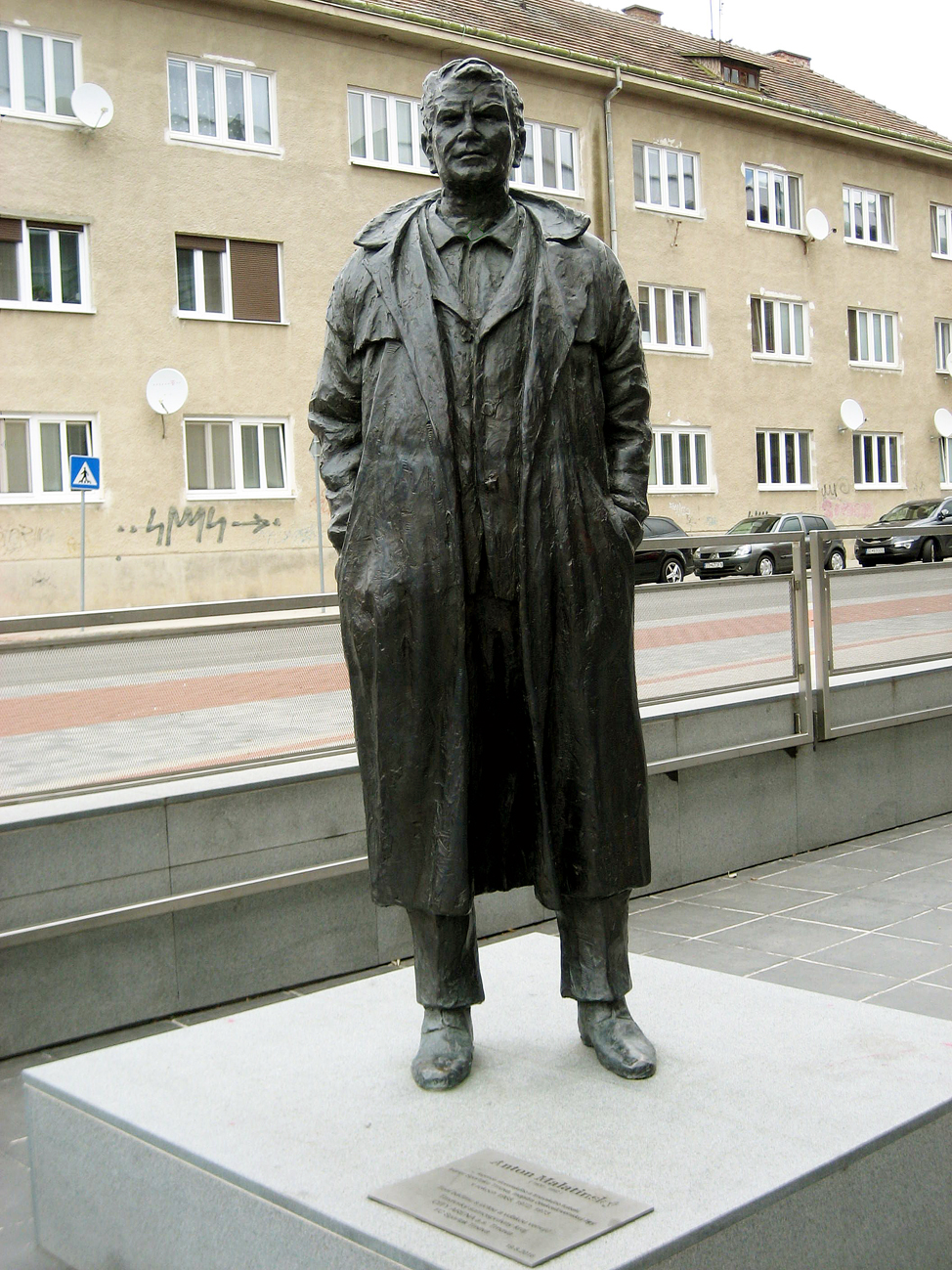

Personal information
- Full name: Anton Malatinský
- Date of birth: 15 January 1920
- Place of birth: Trnava, Czechoslovakia
- Date of death: 1 December 1992 (aged 72)
- Place of death: Bratislava, Czechoslovakia
- Position: Midfielder

Senior career*
Years	Team	Apps	(Gls)
1941–1950	Spartak Trnava		
1950–1951	Sokol NV Bratislava		
- FK Baník Handlová

International career
1942–1943	Slovakia	6	(0)
1948–1951	Czechoslovakia	10	(0)
1948–1949	Czechoslovakia B	2	(1)

Managerial career
- 1956–1960: Spartak Trnava
- 1963–1968: Spartak Trnava
- 1968–1971: Admira Wacker
- 1971–1976: Spartak Trnava
- 1976–1978: ADO Den Haag
- 1978–1981: Slovan Bratislava
- 1981–1982: SC Eisenstadt
- 1982–1984: VSE St. Pölten
- * Club domestic league appearances and goals

Anton Malatinský (15 January 1920 – 1 December 1992) was a Slovak football player and coach. He was a technically adept playmaking midfielder and, as a coach, he was regarded as a good strategist.

Malatinský won two Czechoslovak First League titles as a player and a further three as manager. In his coaching capacity he also led his teams to the Mitropa Cup and two Czechoslovak Cups.

== Playing career ==
He played in 219 league matches and scored 79 goals, most of them for Spartak Trnava. Today, the club's home ground bears his name. Although his time playing for Trnava did not bring any championships, he won the league twice as a player with Sokol NV Bratislava.

Malatinský represented Czechoslovakia in 10 international matches and was included in his nation's squad at the 1954 World Cup but did not play in the tournament. He became only the second Spartak player in history to be selected for the Slovakia national team after František Bolček in 1939, as well as the second selected for Czechoslovakia after Jozef Marko one month earlier in 1948.

== Coaching career ==
Malatinský achieved more fame as a coach than as a player. While still playing football at a high level, he began coaching youth sides. In 1948, he led Spartak's junior team to a national championship.

A knee injury in 1956 ended his playing career, after which he devoted himself exclusively to coaching. He was in charge of Spartak Trnava on three occasions, including two spells during their golden era, for a total of 14 years over two decades. With Trnava he won the 1966–67 Mitropa Cup, three league titles and two domestic cups. He also later coached their arch-rival, Slovan Bratislava, and several clubs in Austria and the Netherlands.

== Honours ==
=== Player ===
Sokol NV Bratislava

- Czechoslovak First League: 1950, 1951

=== Manager ===
Spartak Trnava

- Czechoslovak First League: 1967–68, 1971–72, 1972–73
- Czechoslovak Cup: 1966–67, 1974–75
- Mitropa Cup: 1966–67

== Sources ==
- Anton Malatinský at EU-Football.info (archived)
