= Ján Hucko =

Slovak footballer and coach (1932–2020)

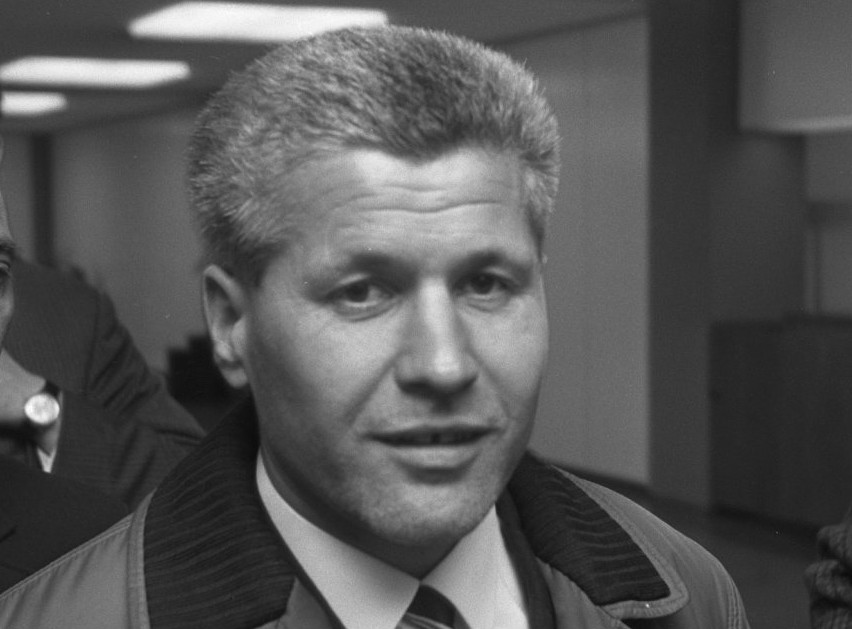
- Hucko in 1969

Personal information
- Date of birth: 11 May 1932
- Place of birth: Dolný Kubín, Czechoslovakia
- Date of death: 20 November 2020
- Position: Midfielder

Senior career*
| Years | Team | Apps | (Gls) |
| 1947–1952 | ŠK Dolný Kubín | | |
| 1952–1954 | Slávia Bratislava | | |
| 1955–1957 | Slovan Bratislava | | |
| 1957–1959 | Dynamo Spoj Bratislava | | |

Managerial career
- 1966–1968: Slovan Bratislava
- 1968–1970: Spartak Trnava
- 1971–1973: Slovan Bratislava
- 1973–1975: Zamalek
- 1975–1976: Jednota Trencin
- 1984: Slovan Bratislava
- * Club domestic league appearances and goals

Ján Hucko (11 May 1932 – 20 November 2020) was a Slovak football player and coach. He coached for FC Spartak Trnava and ŠK Slovan Bratislava.

== Honours ==
=== Manager ===
Zamalek

- October League Cup: 1974
