= Dušan Radolský =

Slovak footballer and manager

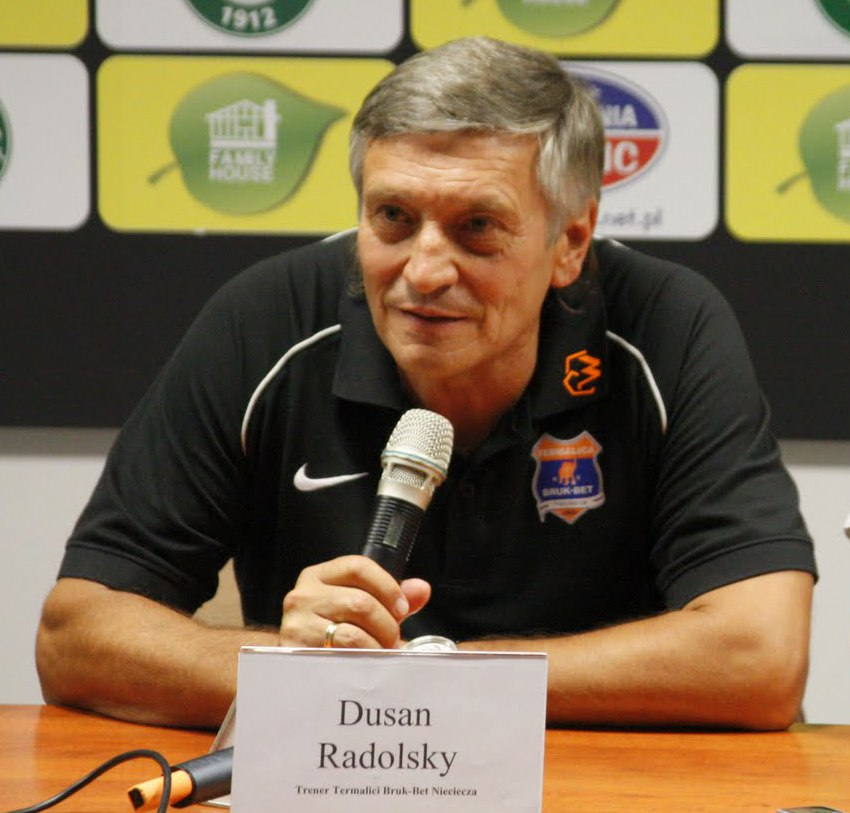
- Radolský in 2011

Personal information
- Date of birth: 13 November 1950 (age 75)
- Place of birth: Trnava, Czechoslovakia
- Position: Forward

Youth career
- 1958–1971: Spartak Trnava

Senior career*
Years	Team	Apps	(Gls)
1971–1972	Dukla Banská Bystrica		
1972–1973	Dukla Tábor		
1973	Dukla Kroměříž		
1973–1975	Spartak Trnava		

Managerial career
- 1986–1987: Sereď
- 1987–1989: Agro Hurbanovo
- 1989–1990: PNZ Senec
- 1992–1993: Dunajská Streda
- 1993–1994: Union Cheb
- 1994–1995: Sigma Olomouc
- 1995–1996: Košice
- 1996: Hradec Králové
- 1996–1997: Žilina
- 1998–2000: Slovakia U21
- 1998: Slovakia (caretaker)
- 1999–2000: JAS Bardejov
- 2000–2001: Al-Shabab
- 2001–2002: 1. FC Synot
- 2002–2003: Slovan Bratislava
- 2003–2005: Dyskobolia Grodzisk
- 2006–2007: Dukla Banská Bystrica
- 2007–2008: Ruch Chorzów
- 2008–2009: Žilina
- 2009: Polonia Warsaw
- 2010–2011: Spartak Trnava
- 2011–2012: LKS Nieciecza
- 2013: LKS Nieciecza
- * Club domestic league appearances and goals

Dušan Radolský (Slovak pronunciation: [ˈduʂan ˈradɔlskiː]; born 13 November 1950) is a Slovak professional football manager and former player.

He has previously managed Polish top flight teams Groclin and Ruch Chorzów. In 2005, under Radolsky, Groclin won the Polish Cup for the first time in their history (in 2020, in connection with proven cases of match-fixing, they were deprived of this title) and he was made an honorary citizen of the town of Grodzisk Wielkopolski.

In 1998, he spent a short time as interim coach of the Slovakia national team. In October 1999, the under-21 national team, under Radolsky, defeated Azerbaijan 3–0 to win its qualifying group for the European championships. The team was eventually among the top four that qualified for the 2000 Summer Olympics in Sydney.

== Honours ==
=== Manager ===
Individual

- Piłka Nożna Foreigner of the Year: 2003
