= FC Spartak Trnava =

Association football club in Slovakia

Spartak Trnava
- Full name: FC Spartak Trnava
- Nickname: Bíli andeli (The White Angels)
- Founded: 30 May 1923; 102 years ago (as TŠS Trnava)
- Ground: Anton Malatinský Stadium
- Capacity: 19,200
- President: Peter Macho
- Head coach: Antonio Muñoz
- League: Slovak First League
- 2025–26: Slovak First League, 3rd of 12
- Website: fcspartaktrnava.com
Home colours	Away colours

FC Spartak Trnava (Slovak pronunciation: [ˈspartak ˈtr̩naʋa]) is a professional football club based in Trnava, Slovakia. The club competes in Slovak First Football League, the top flight in the Slovak league system, having participated in more seasons than any other club.

Founded in 1923, it is one of the most traditionally successful clubs in the country. It has played its home games since inception at Anton Malatinský Stadium, located in the very centre of the city. The club's anthem is Il Silenzio and it has been played prior to every home match since the late 1960s.

Domestically, the club has won six league titles and nine cups. The most successful era came in the 1960s and 1970s, when the club dominated Czechoslovak football, having won the Czechoslovak First League five times in the span of six seasons. During these times, Spartak Trnava also made its name at the international level, having won Mitropa Cup in 1967 and more importantly, progressing to the semi-finals of European Cup in 1969 and quarter-finals in 1973 and 1974 (the former still standing as the record achievement in the competition for Slovak or Czech club). More recently, the club won the Slovak league title in 2018, as well as Slovak cup in 2019, 2022, 2023 and 2025.

The club has a large fan base, having regularly averaged the highest attendance in Slovak football. It has a long-standing rivalry with Slovan Bratislava, with whom it contests the Traditional derby. It also has a rivalry with DAC Dunajská Streda, called the Krajské derby ("Regional derby").

Spartak's colours are red, black and white. Since early days, the home kit consisted of a red-and-black striped shirt. Spartak's away kit has traditionally been completely white, giving the club its nickname bíli andeli (the white angels in local dialect).

== History ==
The club was founded on 30 May 1923 by the merger of Šk Čechie and ČšŠk into TSS Trnava. After a communist takeover it became affiliated with the metal industry and was renamed to TJ Kovosmalt ("Metal-enamel").

=== Previous names ===
- ŠK Rapid Trnava (1923–39)
- TSS Trnava (1939–48)
- Sokol NV Trnava (1948–49)
- TJ Sokol Kovosmalt Trnava (1949–53)
- DŠO Spartak Trnava (1953–62)
- TJ Spartak Trnava (1962–67)
- TJ Spartak TAZ Trnava (1967–88)
- TJ Spartak ZŤS Trnava (1988–93)
- FC Spartak Trnava (1993–present)

=== Golden era ===
In 1952, the club gained its current name, but the performance in those years was very unstable, Spartak played the 2nd league and after advancing to the highest competition, they occupied mostly the lower parts of the table. A better position came only in the 1959/60 season, when Spartak took 4th place. The golden era of Spartak began in the 1966–67 season. The team of legendary coach Anton Malatinský was top of the league by the autumn, but by the end of the season had finished only in third place. Great success was achieved in the Mitropa Cup. Spartak beat teams like Budapest Honvéd, Lazio and Fiorentina and in the final they defeated Újpest of Hungary. In the following season Spartak gained their most memorable European results. They reached the semi-final of the European Cup to face Ajax. It is their greatest success to date.

13 April 1969

Ajax (Netherlands)	3–0	(Czechoslovakia) Spartak Trnava
Cruyff 27'; Swart 52'; Keizer 60'	Report

Olympisch Stadion, Amsterdam
Attendance: 55,490
Referee: Eric Jennings (England)
24 April 1969

Spartak Trnava (Czechoslovakia)	2–0	(Netherlands) Ajax
Kuna 27', 49'	Report

Spartak Stadium, Trnava
Attendance: 22,938
Referee: Ferdinand Marschall (Austria)

Ajax won 3–2 on aggregate.

Under the management of Ján Hucko, the team also won a second championship. In 1970–71 and 1971–72, Trnava won their third and fourth championship titles under coaches Valér Švec and Anton Malatinský. The team also reached the quarter-final of the European Cup in 1973 and 1974. The fifth and the last league title in 1972–73 beckoned the end of Spartak's golden era. In 1976, Karol Dobiaš was in the squad that won the UEFA Euro 1976.

=== 1990s ===
Although Spartak finished 16th (and last) in the last unified Czechoslovak league season in 1992–93, the latter half of the 1990s can be considered the renaissance of football in Trnava. During the 1995–96 season, Spartak finished third and its popularity grew. The 1996–97 season was a memorable one for the fans of Spartak, Karol Pecze almost led the team to its first Slovak league title but got beaten to it by Košice in the final week of competition. The following season, under new coach Dušan Galis the team again achieved second place and then third place during the 1998–99 season which saw the end of this recovery of footballing prowess in Trnava.

=== 2017–2019: Title after 45 years ===
In the 2017–18 season, Spartak won the league title for the first time in 45 years. Under the leadership of coach Nestor El Maestro, Trnava won the title three games before the end of the 2017–18 season after a 2–0 victory over Dunajská Streda. The title celebrations took place after the last season match against AS Trenčín (17,113 spectators). They included an autograph session, a ride through the city on an open bus, fireworks and a solemn Holy Mass in the Cathedral sv. Jána Krstiteľa. These were the biggest title celebrations in the history of Slovakia. During the 2018–19 season, Spartak reached the UEFA Europa League group stage for the first time. They played against GNK Dinamo Zagreb, Fenerbahçe and R.S.C. Anderlecht. They finished 3rd with a record of 2 wins, 1 draw and 3 losses.

Despite an abysmal league campaign, Spartak managed to win the 2018–19 Slovak Cup.

=== 2022–2023 ===
Thanks to defending third place and winning the Slovak Cup, the club secured another chance to compete for European competitions. In the qualification for the European Conference League, Michal Gašparík’s team defeated Newtown 6–2 on aggregate in the 2nd preliminary round, after winning 4–1 and 2–1. In the 3rd preliminary round, they were eliminated by the Polish team Raków Częstochowa. The quest for a European autumn thus ended prematurely and the team focused on the Niké League and the Slovak Cup. The 2023 Slovak Cup final was played at the Anton Malatinský Stadium in front of over 15,000 spectators. In the 110th minute, Jakub Paur gave Spartak the lead with a precise header. The overall result and the defense of the Slovak Cup were sealed with a goal to 3–1 after a converted penalty by Filip Twardzik.

== Honours ==
Type	Competition	Titles	Seasons
Domestic	Czechoslovak First League	5	1967–68, 1968–69, 1970–71, 1971–72, 1972–73
Domestic	Slovak First League	1	2017–18
Domestic	Czechoslovak Cup	4	1966–67, 1970–71, 1974–75, 1985–86
Domestic	Slovak Cup	9	1970–71, 1974–75, 1985–86, 1990–91, 1997–98, 2018–19, 2021–22, 2022–23, 2024–25
Domestic	Slovak Super Cup	1	1998
International	Mitropa Cup	1	1966–67
International	European Cup / UEFA Champions League	–	1968–69 (semi-final), 1972–73, 1973–74 (quarter-final)
International	Small Club World Cup	1	1969

== Stadium ==
Anton Malatinský Stadium is located in the centre of Trnava, directly behind the walls of the old town. Formerly known simply as Spartak stadium, it was renamed in 1998 in honour of the club's most successful manager Anton Malatinský.

Stadium underwent a complex reconstruction in 2013–2015. Opening ceremony of the new stadium took place on 22 August 2015. The stadium has capacity of 18,200 spectators.

== Affiliated clubs ==
The following clubs are currently affiliated with Spartak Trnava:

- (Slovakia) Lokomotíva Trnava (2016–present)
- (Slovakia) PFK Piešťany (2020–present)

== Sponsorship ==
Period	Kit manufacturer	Shirt sponsor
?–1991	Puma	none
1992–95	Liga	none
1995–97	Liga	Slovakofarma
1997–99	Lotto	Slovakofarma
1999–00	Puma	Slovakofarma
2000–01	Puma	none
2001–02	Puma	HORIZONT
2002–03	Puma	none
2003–05	Puma	Sony WEGA
2005–06	Uhlsport	Sony WEGA
2006–07	Uhlsport	Sony
2007–08	Uhlsport	none
2008–10	Nike	none
2010–11	Givova	Danube Wings
2011–12	Givova	TSS Grade
2012–14	Adidas	DanubeWings.eu, ŽOS Trnava
2014–15	Adidas	Škoda Transportation
2015–2018	Adidas	Škoda, ŽOS Trnava
2019	Adidas	PN Invest
2019–2020	Adidas	#DOBRÝ ANJEL
2020–2021	Adidas	none
2021–2023	Adidas	Tipsport
2023–	Puma	Tipsport

== Support ==
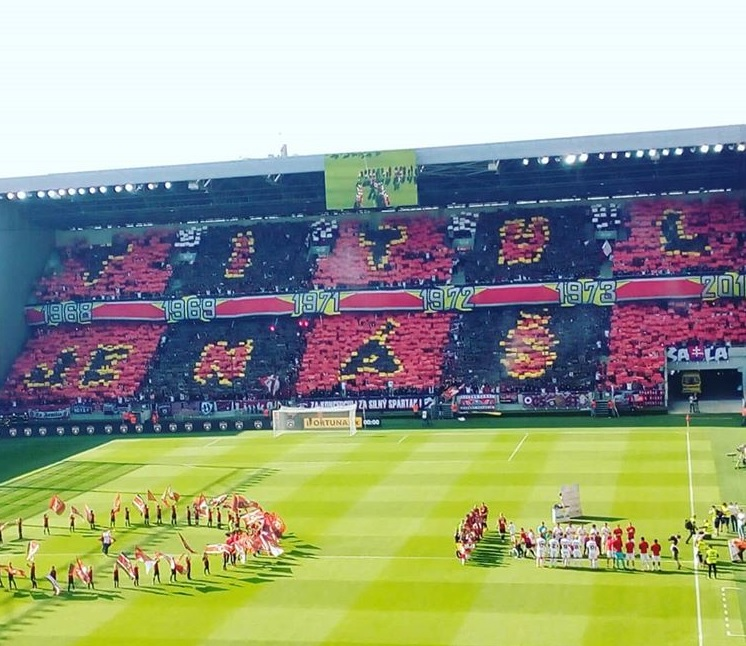
Spartak fans in match against AS Trenčín, on 19 May 2018

The main ultras group are called Ultras Spartak. Traditionally, the club has had great support in the city, but it is very popular in the whole region.

The club's official anthem is Il Silenzio. It is played prior to every home match, when the players are entering onto the pitch.

Since 1988, Spartak ultras have maintained a strong and longstanding friendship with Baník Ostrava (Czech Republic) fans, which remains the closest among their supporter relations. There are also friendly relations with Polish clubs GKS Katowice and ROW Rybnik.

=== Rivalries ===
The greatest rival is Slovan Bratislava. The rivalry has a long tradition and the derby is considered the most prestigious match in the Slovak football calendar. There is also great rivalry with DAC 1904, as they are the second most prominent club in the Trnava Region after Spartak.

== Transfers ==
Spartak have produced numerous players who have gone on to represent the Slovak national football team. Over the last period there has been a steady increase of young players leaving Spartak after a few years of first team football and moving on to play football in leagues of a higher standard, with the Austrian Football Bundesliga (Július Šimon to FK Austria Wien in 1997, season 1997–98 top scorer Ľubomír Luhový to Grazer AK in 1998), Greece Superleague (Erik Sabo to PAOK in 2015, Peter Doležaj to Olympiacos Volos in 2011), French Ligue 1 (Koro Koné to Dijon FCO in 2012, Adam Jakubech to Lille OSC in 2017), Czech First League (Vladimír Leitner to FK Teplice in 2000, Kamil Susko to FC Baník Ostrava in 2000, Adrian Zeljković to Viktoria Plzeň in 2025), Cypriot First Division (Dušan Tittel to AC Omonia in 1999), Norway Tippeligaen (Martin Husár to Lillestrøm SK in 2006), Polish Ekstraklasa (Erik Jendrišek to Crakovia in 2015, Ján Vlasko to Zagłębie Lubin in 2015, Dobrivoj Rusov to Piast Gliwice in 2014, and Ľuboš Kamenár to Śląsk Wrocław in 2016. The top transfer was agreed in 1999 when Miroslav Karhan joined Spanish Real Betis for a fee of €2.3 million.

=== Record transfers ===
Rank	Player	To	Fee	Year
1	(Slovakia) Miroslav Karhan	(Spain) Real Betis	€2.3 million	1999
2	(Slovenia) Adrian Zeljković	(Czech Republic) Viktoria Plzeň	€1.5 million*	2025
3	(Slovakia) Adam Jakubech	(France) Lille OSC	€1.0 million*	2017
4	(Slovakia) Erik Jirka	(Serbia) Red Star Belgrade	€0.75 million*	2018
5	(Slovakia) Erik Sabo	(Greece) PAOK	€0.7 million*	2015
6	(Slovakia) Martin Husár	(Norway) Lillestrøm SK	€0.6 million*	2006

*-unofficial fee

== Players ==
=== Current squad ===
As of 11 October 2026

Note: Flags indicate national team as defined under FIFA eligibility rules; some limited exceptions apply. Players may hold more than one non-FIFA nationality.

No.	Pos.	Nation	Player
1	GK	SVK	Benjamín Száraz
2	DF	HAI	Patrick Nwadike
3	DF	ESP	Juanmi Carrión
4	DF	CZE	Libor Holík
5	MF	SVK	Roman Begala
6	MF	SVK	Roman Procházka
7	MF	AUT	Stefan Škrbo
8	MF	GEO	Giorgi Moistsrapishvili
11	MF	NGR	Philip Azango
13	DF	SVK	Marek Ujlaky
14	FW	NED	Tijmen Wildeboer
15	MF	GHA	Dennis Konney
16	DF	KOS	Melos Bajrami
17	MF	SWE	Lorent Mehmeti
19	FW	SVK	Timotej Kudlička

No.	Pos.	Nation	Player
20	MF	SVK	Filip Trello
21	DF	SVK	Lukáš Fabiš
22	MF	SVK	Dávid Bukovský
24	DF	SVK	Kristián Koštrna
25	DF	GHA	Ivan Mensah
29	DF	SVK	Martin Mikovič (captain)
30	MF	GEO	Luka Khorkheli
31	GK	CZE	Martin Janáček
40	GK	SVK	Tomáš Jablonický
41	GK	SLO	Oskar Casagrande
52	MF	SVK	Erik Sabo
72	GK	SVK	Martin Vantruba
91	MF	CRO	Marin Laušić
97	FW	SVK	David Polťák

For recent transfers, see List of Slovak football transfers summer 2026.

=== On loan ===
Note: Flags indicate national team as defined under FIFA eligibility rules; some limited exceptions apply. Players may hold more than one non-FIFA nationality.

No.	Pos.	Nation	Player
12	MF	SVK	Kristián Pavol Stručka (on loan at Dynamo Malženice until 30 June 2027)
27	DF	SVK	Michal Tomič (on loan at Dukla Prague until 30 June 2027)
—	DF	SVK	Patrick Karhan (on loan at Skalica until 30 June 2027)
—	GK	SVK	Patrik Vasiľ (on loan at Zlaté Moravce until 30 June 2027)
—	DF	SVK	Lukáš Pristach (on loan at Dynamo Malženice until 30 June 2027)
—	DF	SVK	Tadeáš Husár (on loan at Dynamo Malženice until 30 June 2027)

=== Retired numbers ===
Note: Flags indicate national team as defined under FIFA eligibility rules; some limited exceptions apply. Players may hold more than one non-FIFA nationality.

No.	Pos.	Nation	Player
9	MF	SVK	Ladislav Kuna (posthumous honour)
10	FW	SVK	Jozef Adamec (posthumous honour)

=== Current technical staff ===
Position	Staff
Head coach	(Spain) Antonio Muñoz
Assistant coaches	(Spain) Ibón Arrieta (Slovakia) Mário Auxt (Slovakia) Gergely Geri
Goalkeeping coach	(Slovakia) Pavel Kamesch
Fitness coach	(Slovakia) Michal Kukučka
Custodian	(Slovakia) Martin Bohunický
Video analyst	(Hungary) Csaba Csetényi
Physiotherapists	(Slovakia) Nikolas Ňaňko (Slovakia) Andrej Matonok
Masseur	(Slovakia) Marcel Křivánek
Club doctors	(Slovakia) Marko Bernadič (Slovakia) Viliam Vadrna

Last updated: 7 September 2026

== Club officials ==
Position	Name
President	(Slovakia) Peter Macho
Sporting director	(Slovakia) Martin Škrtel
Operations manager	(Slovakia) Pavol Bielik
Technical manager	(Slovakia) Michal Maron
PR manager	(Slovakia) Samuel Ďurinský
Youth director	(Slovakia) Marián Hýbela

== Records ==
=== League history ===
- Czechoslovak First League (1948–93)

Season	League	Pos./Teams	Played	Wins	Draws	Losses	Score	Points	Managers	Top scorer (goals)
1964–65	Czechoslovak First League	10th/14	26	8	8	10	33:36	24	Anton Malatinský	Anton Hrušecký (7); Valér Švec (7)
1965–66	Czechoslovak First League	6th/14	26	12	3	11	34:26	27	Anton Malatinský	Valér Švec (9)
1966–67	Czechoslovak First League	3rd/14	26	16	2	8	53:26	34	Anton Malatinský	Jozef Adamec (21)
1967–68	Czechoslovak First League	1st/14	26	15	5	6	57:26	35	Anton Malatinský	Jozef Adamec (18)
1968–69	Czechoslovak First League	1st/14	26	17	5	4	50:21	39	Ján Hucko	Adam Farkaš (13)
1969–70	Czechoslovak First League	2nd/16	30	15	10	5	55:23	40	Ján Hucko	Jozef Adamec (16)
1970–71	Czechoslovak First League	1st/16	30	17	6	7	52:27	40	Valér Švec	Jozef Adamec (16)
1971–72	Czechoslovak First League	1st/16	30	17	10	3	60:25	44	Anton Malatinský	Jozef Adamec (14)
1972–73	Czechoslovak First League	1st/16	30	16	7	7	47:20	39	Anton Malatinský	Ladislav Kuna (9)
1973–74	Czechoslovak First League	7th/16	30	8	13	9	32:31	29	Anton Malatinský	Ladislav Kuna (7); Jozef Adamec (7)
1974–75	Czechoslovak First League	6th/16	30	12	6	12	32:36	30	Anton Malatinský	Tibor Jančula (7)
1975–76	Czechoslovak First League	10th/16	30	12	5	13	35:32	29	Anton Malatinský	Jozef Adamec (6)
1976–77	Czechoslovak First League	14th/16	30	9	8	13	26:47	26	Milan Moravec	Ladislav Kuna (5)
1977–78	Czechoslovak First League	9th/16	30	8	12	10	26:31	28	Viliam Novák	Viliam Martinák (5); Michal Gašparík (5)
1978–79	Czechoslovak First League	12th/16	30	7	13	10	34:37	27	Valér Švec	Michal Gašparík (9)
1979–80	Czechoslovak First League	7th/16	30	11	10	9	35:35	32	Valér Švec	Marián Brezina (8)
1980–81	Czechoslovak First League	10th/16	30	13	3	14	36:43	29	Kamil Majerník	Marián Brezina (6)
1981–82	Czechoslovak First League	14th/16	30	10	4	16	31:41	24	Kamil Majerník	Michal Gašparík (6); Jozef Medgyes (6)
1982–83	Czechoslovak First League	8th/16	30	12	6	12	29:39	30	Justín Javorek	Michal Gašparík (8)
1983–84	Czechoslovak First League	8th/16	30	12	6	12	29:39	30	Justín Javorek	Michal Gašparík (8)
1983–84	Czechoslovak First League	7th/16	30	11	7	12	43:50	29	Justín Javorek	Michal Gašparík (10)
1984–85	Czechoslovak First League	9th/16	30	10	9	11	33:39	29	Justín Javorek	Jozef Dian (6)
1985–86	Czechoslovak First League	10th/16	30	9	9	12	25:32	27	Stanislav Jarábek	Michal Gašparík (5)
1986–87	Czechoslovak First League	11th/16	30	12	3	15	41:52	27	Stanislav Jarábek	Attila Belanský (9)
1987–88	Czechoslovak First League	10th/16	30	11	7	12	38:42	29	Stanislav Jarábek	Attila Belanský (4); Ivan Hucko (4); Jaroslav Hutta (4)
1988–89	Czechoslovak First League	12th/16	30	10	7	13	36:46	27	Stanislav Jarábek	Igor Klejch (12)
1989–90	Czechoslovak First League ↓	15th/16	30	4	10	16	23:62	21	Ladislav Kuna; Dušan Radolský	Ján Gabriel (4)
1990–91	1.SNL ↑	1st	30	17	7	6	65:25	41	Valér Švec	
1991–92	Czechoslovak First League	14th/16	30	6	9	15	21:59	21	Valér Švec	Ján Solár (4); Marek Ujlaky (4)
1992–93	Czechoslovak First League ↓	16th/16	30	3	10	17	24:60	16	Valér Švec; Richard Matovič	Július Zemaník (6)

- Slovak First League (1993–present)

Season	League	Pos./Teams	Played	Wins	Draws	Losses	Score	Points	Managers	Top scorer (Goals)
1993–94	Slovak First League	7th/12	32	8	12	12	25:32	28	Ladislav Jurkemik, Justín Javorek	(Slovakia) Marián Klago (5) (Slovakia) Milan Malatinský (5)
1994–95	Slovak First League	6th/12	32	12	8	12	43:35	44	Karol Pecze	(Slovakia) Stanislav Moravec (7)
1995–96	Slovak First League	3rd/12	32	19	6	7	54:32	63	Karol Pecze	(Slovakia) Marek Ujlaky (11)
1996–97	Slovak First League	2nd/16	30	21	6	3	66:24	69	Karol Pecze	(Slovakia) Július Šimon (14)
1997–98	Slovak First League	2nd/16	30	20	6	4	61:34	66	Dušan Galis	(Slovakia) Ľubomír Luhový (17)
1998–99	Slovak First League	3rd/16	30	19	7	4	59:20	64	Dušan Galis, Peter Zelenský	(Brazil) Fábio Gomes (9)
1999–00	Slovak First League	4th/16	30	15	8	7	38:21	53	Anton Jánoš	(Brazil) Fábio Gomes (10)
2000–01	Slovak First League ↓	10th/10	36	8	10	18	39:62	34	Anton Jánoš, Peter Zelenský; Stanislav Jarábek	(Slovakia) Marek Ujlaky (9)
2001–02	2nd league ↑	1st/16	30	18	7	5	61:22	61	Ladislav Molnár, Rastislav Vincúr; Jozef Adamec	(Slovakia) Miroslav Kriss (12)
2002–03	Slovak First League	4th/10	36	15	11	10	55:47	56	Jozef Adamec	(Slovakia) Vladimír Kožuch (12)
2003–04	Slovak First League	4th/10	36	15	8	13	46:46	53	Miroslav Svoboda, Stanislav Jarábek; Vladimír Ekhardt	(Slovakia) Miroslav Kriss (11)
2004–05	Slovak First League	5th/10	36	12	10	14	39:37	46	Jozef Vukušič, Milan Lešický	(Slovakia) Pavol Masaryk (9)
2005–06	Slovak First League	3rd/10	36	21	5	10	57:31	68	Jozef Adamec	(Slovakia) Miroslav Kriss (12)
2006–07	Slovak First League	9th/12	36	13	10	13	40:46	49	Jozef Bubenko, Jozef Adamec; Jozef Šuran, Ivan Hucko	(Slovakia) Miroslav Kriss (7)
2007–08	Slovak First League	4th/12	33	15	7	11	52:40	52	(Czech Republic) Josef Mazura, Jozef Adamec	(Slovakia) Ľubomír Bernáth (9)
2008–09	Slovak First League	3rd/12	33	15	10	8	45:38	55	(Serbia) Vladimir Vermezović, Karol Pecze	(Slovakia) Vladimír Kožuch (8)
2009–10	Slovak First League	7th/12	33	12	5	16	52:46	41	Karol Pecze, Ľuboš Nosický; Milan Malatinský, Peter Zelenský	(Slovakia) Peter Doležaj (9)
2010–11	Slovak First League	4th/12	33	13	10	10	40:30	49	Dušan Radolský, Peter Zelenský	(Ivory Coast) Koro Koné (10)
2011–12	Slovak First League	2nd/12	33	19	8	6	44:22	65	(Czech Republic) Pavel Hoftych	(Czech Republic) Martin Vyskočil (9)
2012–13	Slovak First League	11th/12	33	8	11	14	34:51	35	(Czech Republic) Pavel Hoftych, Peter Zelenský; Vladimír Ekhardt	(Czech Republic) Martin Vyskočil (6)
2013–14	Slovak First League	3rd/12	33	16	5	12	47:42	53	Juraj Jarábek	(Slovakia) Erik Sabo (10)
2014–15	Slovak First League	4th/12	33	16	8	9	53:31	56	Juraj Jarábek	(Slovakia) Erik Sabo (11) (Slovakia) Ján Vlasko (11)
2015–16	Slovak First League	4th/12	33	16	6	11	49:41	54	Juraj Jarábek, Branislav Mráz; Ivan Hucko, Miroslav Karhan	(Slovakia) David Depetris (15)
2016–17	Slovak First League	6th/11	30	12	7	11	34:37	43	Miroslav Karhan	(Cameroon) Robert Tambe (6) (Slovakia) Erik Jirka (6)
2017–18	Slovak First League	1st/12	32	20	4	8	41:28	64	(England) Nestor El Maestro	(Austria) Marvin Egho (7)
2018–19	Slovak First League	7th/12	32	10	8	14	35:35	37	(Czech Republic) Radoslav Látal, (Czech Republic) Michal Ščasný	(Austria) Kubilay Yilmaz (9)
2019–20	Slovak First League	4th/12	27	10	5	12	30:32	35	(Portugal) Ricardo Chéu, Marián Šarmír	(Austria) Alex Sobczyk (8)
2020–21	Slovak First League	3rd/12	32	17	4	11	48:37	55	M.Šarmír, Norbert Hrnčár, Michal Gašparík	(Nigeria) Bamidele Yusuf (9)
2021–22	Slovak First League	3rd/12	32	17	9	6	36:17	60	Michal Gašparík	(North Macedonia) Milan Ristovski (8)
2022–23	Slovak First League	3rd/12	32	15	7	10	55:38	52	Michal Gašparík	(Nigeria) Abdulrahman Taiwo (14)
2023–24	Slovak First League	3rd/12	32	18	3	11	47:29	57	Michal Gašparík	(Slovakia) Michal Ďuriš (10)
2024–25	Slovak First League	3rd/12	32	14	10	8	46:34	52	Michal Gašparík	(Ghana) Kelvin Ofori (9)
2025–26	Slovak First League	3rd/12	32	17	5	10	51:37	56	(Czech Republic) Michal Ščasný, Martin Škrtel, (Spain) Antonio Muñoz	(Nigeria) Taiwo, (Nigeria) Gong, (Georgia (country)) Khorkheli (6)

== European competitions ==
Season	Competition	Round	Club	Home	Away	Aggregate
1960	Mitropa Cup	Group	(Italy) Roma	2–0	0–1	2–1
1962	Mitropa Cup	Group	(Socialist Federal Republic of Yugoslavia) Vojvodina	0–0	1–0	1–0
1962	Mitropa Cup	Group	(Hungary) Vasas	2–2	0–5	2–7
1962	Mitropa Cup	Group	(Italy) Fiorentina	1–6	3–4	4–10
1966–67	Mitropa Cup	First round	(Hungary) Budapest Honvéd	4–0	1–1	5–1
1966–67	Mitropa Cup	Quarter-finals	(Italy) Lazio	1–0	1–1	2–1
1966–67	Mitropa Cup	Semi-finals	(Italy) Fiorentina	2–0	1–2	3–2
1966–67	Mitropa Cup	Final	(Hungary) Újpesti Dózsa	3–1	2–3	5–4
1967–68	Mitropa Cup	First round	(Italy) Roma	2–1	1–1	3–2
1967–68	Mitropa Cup	Quarter-finals	(Socialist Federal Republic of Yugoslavia) Željezničar Sarajevo	2–1	2–2	4–3
1967–68	Mitropa Cup	Semi-finals	(Socialist Federal Republic of Yugoslavia) Vardar	4–1	2–2	6–3
1967–68	Mitropa Cup	Final	(Socialist Federal Republic of Yugoslavia) Red Star Belgrade	1–0	1–4	2–4
1967–68	UEFA Cup Winners' Cup	First round	(Switzerland) Lausanne-Sports	2–0	2–3	4–3
1967–68	UEFA Cup Winners' Cup	Second round	(Soviet Union) Torpedo Moscow	1–3	0–3	1–6
1968–69	European Cup	First round	(Romania) Steaua București	4–0	1–3	5–3
1968–69	European Cup	Second round	(Finland) Reipas Lahti	7–1	9–1	16–2
1968–69	European Cup	Quarter-finals	(Greece) AEK Athens	2–1	1–1	3–2
1968–69	European Cup	Semi-finals	(Netherlands) Ajax	2–0	0–3	2–3
1969–70	European Cup	First round	(Malta) Hibernians	4–0	2–2	6–2
1969–70	European Cup	Second round	(Turkey) Galatasaray	1–0	0–1	1–1 (cf)
1970–71	Inter-Cities Fairs Cup	First round	(France) Marseille	2–0	0–2	2–2 (4–3) (p)
1970–71	Inter-Cities Fairs Cup	Second round	(West Germany) Hertha	3–1	0–1	3–2
1970–71	Inter-Cities Fairs Cup	Third round	(West Germany) Köln	0–1	0–3	0–4
1971–72	European Cup	First round	(Romania) Dinamo București	2–2	0–0	2–2 (ag)
1972–73	European Cup	Second round	(Belgium) Anderlecht	1–0	1–0	2–0
1972–73	European Cup	Quarter-finals	(England) Derby County	1–0	0–2	1–2
1973–74	European Cup	First round	(Norway) Viking	1–0	2–1	3–1
1973–74	European Cup	Second round	(Soviet Union) Zorya Voroshilovgrad	0–0	1–0	1–0
1973–74	European Cup	Quarter-finals	(Hungary) Újpesti Dózsa	1–1	1–1	2–2 (3–4) (p)
1974	Intertoto cup	Group	(Poland) Wisła Kraków	0–0	2–2	
1974	Intertoto cup	Group	(Sweden) AIK	2–1	1–0	
1974	Intertoto cup	Group	(Austria) VÖEST Linz	2–1	0–1	
1975	Intertoto cup	Group	(Denmark) KB	6–1	5–1	
1975	Intertoto cup	Group	(Portugal) Belenenses	2–2	1–2	
1975	Intertoto cup	Group	(Netherlands) Amsterdam	2–0	1–1	
1975–76	UEFA Cup Winners' Cup	First round	(Portugal) Boavista	0–0	0–3	0–3
1976	Intertoto cup	Group	(Sweden) Åtvidaberg	3–1	3–1	
1976	Intertoto cup	Group	(Norway) Lillestrøm	5–1	1–1	
1976	Intertoto cup	Group	Austria Salzburg	2–0	3–1	
1979	Intertoto cup	Group	(Denmark) Esbjerg	2–0	1–0	
1979	Intertoto cup	Group	(Sweden) Kalmar	1–0	1–0	
1979	Intertoto cup	Group	(Austria) First Vienna	3–0	1–1	
1984	Intertoto cup	Group	(Switzerland) Zürich	2–0	1–2	
1984	Intertoto cup	Group	(Hungary) Ferencváros	1–1	1–3	
1984	Intertoto cup	Group	Austria Klagenfurt	3–1	4–2	
1986–87	UEFA Cup Winners' Cup	First round	(West Germany) Stuttgart	0–0	0–1	0–1
1996	UEFA Intertoto Cup	Group	(Federal Republic of Yugoslavia) Čukarički Stankom	3–0		
1996	UEFA Intertoto Cup	Group	(Latvia) Daugava		6–0	
1996	UEFA Intertoto Cup	Group	(Germany) Karlsruhe	1–1		
1996	UEFA Intertoto Cup	Group	(Romania) Universitatea Craiova		1–2	
1997–98	UEFA Cup	First qualifying round	(Malta) Birkirkara	3–1	1–0	4–1
1997–98	UEFA Cup	Second qualifying round	(Greece) PAOK	0–1	3–5	3–6
1998–99	UEFA Cup Winners' Cup	Qualifying round	(North Macedonia) Vardar	2–0	1–0	3–0
1998–99	UEFA Cup Winners' Cup	First round	(Turkey) Beşiktaş	2–1	0–3	2–4
1999–00	UEFA Cup	Qualifying round	(Albania) Vllaznia	2–0	1–1	3–1
1999–00	UEFA Cup	First round	(Austria) Grazer AK	2–1	0–3	2–4
2003	UEFA Intertoto Cup	First round	(North Macedonia) Pobeda	1–5	1–2	2–7
2004	UEFA Intertoto Cup	First round	(Hungary) Debrecen	3–0	1–4	4–4 (ag)
2004	UEFA Intertoto Cup	Second round	(Bosnia and Herzegovina) Sloboda Tuzla	2–1	1–0	3–1
2004	UEFA Intertoto Cup	Third round	(Croatia) Slaven Koprivnica	2–2	0–0	2–2 (ag)
2006–07	UEFA Cup	First qualifying round	(Azerbaijan) Karvan	0–1	0–1	0–2
2008–09	UEFA Cup	First qualifying round	(Georgia (country)) WIT Georgia	2–2	0–1	2–3
2009–10	UEFA Europa League	First qualifying round	(Azerbaijan) Inter Baku	2–1	3–1	5–2
2009–10	UEFA Europa League	Second qualifying round	(Bosnia and Herzegovina) Sarajevo	1–1	0–1	1–2
2011–12	UEFA Europa League	First qualifying round	(Montenegro) Zeta	3–0	1–2	4–2
2011–12	UEFA Europa League	Second qualifying round	(Albania) Tirana	3–1	0–0	3–1
2011–12	UEFA Europa League	Third qualifying round	(Bulgaria) Levski Sofia	2–1	1–2	3–3 (5–4) (p)
2011–12	UEFA Europa League	Play-off round	(Russia) Lokomotiv Moscow	1–1	0–2	1–3
2012–13	UEFA Europa League	Second qualifying round	(Republic of Ireland) Sligo Rovers	3–1	1–1	4–1
2012–13	UEFA Europa League	Third qualifying round	(Romania) Steaua București	0–3	1–0	1–3
2014–15	UEFA Europa League	First qualifying round	(Malta) Hibernians	5–0	4–2	9–2
2014–15	UEFA Europa League	Second qualifying round	(Georgia (country)) Zestaponi	3–0	0–0	3–0
2014–15	UEFA Europa League	Third qualifying round	(Scotland) St. Johnstone	1–1	2–1	3–2
2014–15	UEFA Europa League	Play-off round	(Switzerland) Zürich	1–3	1–1	2–4
2015–16	UEFA Europa League	First qualifying round	(Bosnia and Herzegovina) Olimpic Sarajevo	0–0	1–1	1–1 (a)
2015–16	UEFA Europa League	Second qualifying round	(Northern Ireland) Linfield	2–1	3–1	5–2
2015–16	UEFA Europa League	Third qualifying round	(Greece) PAOK	1–1	0–1	1–2
2016–17	UEFA Europa League	First qualifying round	(Malta) Hibernians	3–0	3–0	6–0
2016–17	UEFA Europa League	Second qualifying round	(Armenia) Shirak	2–0	1–1	3–1
2016–17	UEFA Europa League	Third qualifying round	Austria Wien	0–1	1–0	1–1 (4–5) (p)
2018–19	UEFA Champions League	First qualifying round	(Bosnia and Herzegovina) Zrinjski Mostar	1–0	1–1	2–1
2018–19	UEFA Champions League	Second qualifying round	(Poland) Legia Warsaw	0–1	2–0	2–1
2018–19	UEFA Champions League	Third qualifying round	(Serbia) Red Star Belgrade	1–2 (a.e.t)	1–1	2–3
2018–19	UEFA Europa League	Play-off round	(Slovenia) Olimpija Ljubljana	1–1	2–0	3–1
2018–19	UEFA Europa League	Group D	(Belgium) Anderlecht	1–0	0–0	3rd place 7pts
2018–19	UEFA Europa League	Group D	(Turkey) Fenerbahçe	1–0	0–2	3rd place 7pts
2018–19	UEFA Europa League	Group D	(Croatia) Dinamo Zagreb	1–2	1–3	3rd place 7pts
2019–20	UEFA Europa League	First qualifying round	(Bosnia and Herzegovina) Radnik Bijeljina	2–0	0–2	2–2 (3–2 p)
2019–20	UEFA Europa League	Second qualifying round	(Bulgaria) Lokomotiv Plovdiv	3–1	0–2	3–3 (a)
2021–22	UEFA Europa Conference League	First qualifying round	(Malta) Mosta	2–0	2–3	4–3
2021–22	UEFA Europa Conference League	Second qualifying round	(Romania) Sepsi OSK	0–0	1–1 (a.e.t.)	1–1 (4–3 p)
2021–22	UEFA Europa Conference League	Third qualifying round	(Israel) Maccabi Tel Aviv	0–0	0–1	0−1
2022–23	UEFA Europa Conference League	Second qualifying round	(Wales) Newtown	4–1	2–1	6–2
2022–23	UEFA Europa Conference League	Third qualifying round	(Poland) Raków Częstochowa	0–2	0–1	0–3
2023–24	UEFA Europa Conference League	Second qualifying round	(Latvia) Auda	4–1	1–1	5−2
2023–24	UEFA Europa Conference League	Third qualifying round	(Poland) Lech Poznań	3–1	1–2	4–3
2023–24	UEFA Europa Conference League	Play-off round	(Ukraine) SC Dnipro-1	1–1	2–1 (a.e.t)	3–2
2023–24	UEFA Europa Conference League	Group H	(Denmark) FC Nordsjælland	0–2	1–1	4th place 1pt
2023–24	UEFA Europa Conference League	Group H	(Turkey) Fenerbahçe	1–2	0–4	4th place 1pt
2023–24	UEFA Europa Conference League	Group H	(Bulgaria) Ludogorets	1–2	0–4	4th place 1pt
2024–25	UEFA Conference League	Second qualifying round	(Bosnia and Herzegovina) Sarajevo	3–0	0–0	3−0
2024–25	UEFA Conference League	Third qualifying round	(Poland) Wisła Kraków	3–1	1–3 (a.e.t.)	4–4 (11–12 p)
2025–26	UEFA Europa League	First qualifying round	(Sweden) BK Häcken	0−1	2–2	2−3
2025–26	UEFA Conference League	Second qualifying round	(Malta) Hibernians	5–1	2–1	7–2
2025–26	UEFA Conference League	Third qualifying round	(Romania) CS Universitatea Craiova	4–3 (a.e.t.)	0−3	4–6
2026–27	UEFA Conference League	Second qualifying round	(Bulgaria) CSKA 1948	0–0	0–0 (a.e.t.)	0–0 (3–5 p)

== Notable players ==
Had international caps for their respective countries. Players whose name is listed with a bold represented their countries while playing for Spartak.

Past (and present) players who are the subjects of Wikipedia articles can be found here.

- (Suriname) Myenty Abena
- (Slovakia) **Jozef Adamec**
- (Nigeria) Izuchuckwu Anthony
- (Burkina Faso) Cedric Badolo
- (Slovakia) Marek Bakoš
- (Slovakia) **Igor Bališ**
- (Slovakia) Miroslav Barčík
- (Benin) **Bello Babatounde**
- (Czechoslovakia) Michal Benedikovič
- (Slovakia) Mário Bicák
- (Czechoslovakia) Július Bielik
- (Czechoslovakia) **Marián Brezina**
- (Slovakia) **František Bolček**
- (Latvia) Nauris Bulvītis
- (Georgia (country)) **Vakhtang Chanturishvili**
- (Czech Republic) Marek Čech
- (Bosnia and Herzegovina) **Eldar Ćivić**
- (Slovakia) **Matúš Čonka**
- (Slovakia) David Depetris
- (Guinea) **Boubacar Diallo**
- (Austria) Marco Djuricin
- (Czechoslovakia) **Karol Dobiaš**
- (Slovakia) Peter Doležaj
- (Czech Republic) Lukáš Došek
- (Czech Republic) Václav Drobný
- (Slovakia) Michal Ďuriš
- (Malta) **Jean Paul Farrugia**
- (Azerbaijan) Ali Ghorbani
- (Czechoslovakia) (Slovakia) Miloš Glonek
- (Czechoslovakia) **Vladimír Hagara**
- (Slovakia) Ľuboš Hanzel
- (Bosnia and Herzegovina) Haris Harba
- (Slovakia) **Jaroslav Hrabal**
- (Czechoslovakia) **Anton Hrušecký**
- (Bosnia and Herzegovina) Sergej Jakirović
- (Slovakia) **Adam Jakubech**
- (Czechoslovakia) **Stanislav Jarábek**
- (Slovakia) Erik Jendrišek
- (Slovakia) Erik Jirka
- (Slovakia) Róbert Jež
- (Slovakia) Jozef Juriga
- (Czechoslovakia) **Dušan Kabát**
- (Slovakia) Ľuboš Kamenár
- (Slovakia) **Miroslav Karhan**
- (Slovakia) **Marek Kaščák**
- (Croatia) Ivan Kelava
- (Czechoslovakia) **Dušan Keketi**
- (Slovakia) Miroslav König
- (Slovakia) **Kamil Kopúnek**
- (Slovakia) **Rastislav Kostka**
- (Czechoslovakia) **Jaroslav Kravárik**
- (Slovakia) **Vladimír Kožuch**
- (Serbia and Montenegro) Ivica Kralj
- (Czechoslovakia) **Ladislav Kuna**
- (Slovakia) Vladimír Labant
- (Slovakia) **Vladimír Leitner**
- (Slovakia) Martin Lipčák
- (Czechoslovakia) (Slovakia) **Ľubomír Luhový**
- (Czechoslovakia) **Kamil Majerník**
- (Slovakia) (Czechoslovakia) **Anton Malatinský**
- (Slovakia) **Milan Malatinský**
- (Poland) Patryk Małecki
- (Czechoslovakia) **Jozef Marko**
- (North Macedonia) **Kire Markoski**
- (Czechoslovakia) **Jaroslav Masrna**
- (Slovakia) Ivan Mesík
- (Togo) **Idjessi Metsoko**
- (Slovakia) Rastislav Michalík
- (Romania) Bogdan Mitrea
- (Slovakia) Stanislav Moravec
- (Bosnia and Herzegovina) Stevo Nikolić
- (Slovakia) Sebastian Nebyla
- (Slovakia) Tomáš Oravec
- (Slovakia) Filip Oršula
- (Slovakia) Erik Pačinda
- (Austria) Yasin Pehlivan
- (Costa Rica) Ricardo Peña
- (Slovakia) **Martin Poljovka**
- (Czech Republic) Tomáš Poznar
- (Slovakia) Roman Procházka
- (Czech Republic) Jakub Rada
- (Syria) Ammar Ramadan
- (Czech Republic) Martin Raška
- (North Macedonia) **Milan Ristovski**
- (Slovakia) Branislav Rzeszoto
- (Slovakia) **Erik Sabo**
- (Slovakia) **Július Šimon**
- (Slovakia) Ivan Schranz
- (Georgia (country)) Davit Skhirtladze
- (Slovakia) Martin Škrtel
- (Slovakia) Dušan Sninský
- (Slovakia) Ján Solár
- (Niger) Soune Soungole
- (Czechoslovakia) **Imrich Stacho**
- (Slovakia) Samuel Štefánik
- (Slovakia) Lukáš Štetina
- (Czechoslovakia) **Jozef Štibrányi**
- (Slovakia) Peter Štyvar
- (Slovakia) **Kamil Susko**
- (Slovakia) Dominik Takáč
- (Slovakia) **Ľubomír Talda**
- (Cameroon) **Robert Tambe**
- (Czechoslovakia) (Slovakia) **Jaroslav Timko**
- (Czechoslovakia) (Slovakia) Dušan Tittel
- (Slovakia) Michal Tomič
- (Slovenia) Dejan Trajkovski
- (Slovakia) **Marek Ujlaky**
- (Curaçao) Gino van Kessel
- (Czechoslovakia) **Vojtěch Varadín**
- (Czech Republic) Martin Vyskočil
- (Slovenia) **Adrian Zeljković**
- (Czechoslovakia) **Peter Zelenský**
- (Czechoslovakia) Ján Zlocha
- (Slovakia) Vladislav Zvara

== Player records ==
=== Most appearances ===
#	Nat.	Name	App.
1	(Czechoslovakia)	Ladislav Kuna	428
2	(Slovakia)	Marek Ujlaky	366
3	(Slovakia)	Jozef Adamec	328
4	(Czechoslovakia)	Dušan Kéketi	309
5	(Czechoslovakia)	Dušan Kabát	285
6	(Czechoslovakia)	Karol Dobiaš	279
.	(Czechoslovakia)	Anton Hrušecký	279
8	(Slovakia)	Jaroslav Hrabal	275
9	(Slovakia)	Michal Gašparík	260
10	(Czechoslovakia)	Stanislav Jarábek	258

=== Most goals ===
#	Nat.	Name	Goals
1	(Slovakia)	Jozef Adamec	139
2	(Slovakia)	Marek Ujlaky	87
3	(Czechoslovakia)	Ladislav Kuna	85
4	(Czechoslovakia)	Valér Švec	65
5	(Czechoslovakia)	Anton Malatinský	64
6	(Slovakia)	Vladimír Kožuch	62
7	(Slovakia)	Michal Gašparík	53
8	(Slovakia)	František Bolček	51
9	(Czechoslovakia)	Ján Šturdík	48
10	(Czechoslovakia)	Karol Tibenský	42
.	(Czechoslovakia)	Viliam Jakubčík	42

== Manager history ==
Name	Nat.	Years
Otto Horký	(Slovakia)	1939–40
Bruno Veselý	(Czechoslovakia)	1940–41
Otto Horký	(Czechoslovakia)	1941–42
Štefan Hadraba	(Czechoslovakia)	1942–44
Ervín Kováč	(Czechoslovakia)	1945–48
Anton Malatinský	(Czechoslovakia)	1948–50
Karol Fekete	(Czechoslovakia)	1950–52
Jozef Marko	(Czechoslovakia)	1952–54
František Novotný	(Czechoslovakia)	1955
Alexander Fekete	(Czechoslovakia)	1955–56
Anton Malatinský	(Czechoslovakia)	1956–60
Jozef Hagara	(Czechoslovakia)	1960
Bozhin Laskov	(Bulgaria)	1961
Alexander Lančarič	(Czechoslovakia)	1961
František Gažo	(Czechoslovakia)	1962–63
Anton Malatinský	(Czechoslovakia)	1963–68
Ján Hucko	(Czechoslovakia)	1968–70
Valér Švec	(Czechoslovakia)	1970–71
Anton Malatinský	(Czechoslovakia)	1971–76
Milan Moravec	(Czechoslovakia)	1976–77
Viliam Novák	(Czechoslovakia)	1977–78
Valér Švec	(Czechoslovakia)	1978–80
Kamil Majerník	(Czechoslovakia)	1980–82
Justín Javorek	(Czechoslovakia)	1982–85
Stanislav Jarábek	(Czechoslovakia)	1985–88

Name	Nat.	Years
Ladislav Kuna	(Czechoslovakia)	1988–90
Valér Švec	(Czechoslovakia)	1990–92
Ivan Haščík	(Slovakia)	1993
Richard Matovič	(Slovakia)	1993
Ladislav Jurkemik	(Slovakia)	1993–94
Justín Javorek	(Slovakia)	1994
Karol Pecze	(Slovakia)	1994–97
Dušan Galis	(Slovakia)	1997–99
Peter Zelenský	(Slovakia)	1999
Anton Jánoš	(Slovakia)	1999–2000
Peter Zelenský	(Slovakia)	2000–01
Stanislav Jarábek	(Slovakia)	2001
Ladislav Molnár	(Slovakia)	2001
Rastislav Vincúr	(Slovakia)	2001
Jozef Adamec	(Slovakia)	2002–03
Miroslav Svoboda	(Slovakia)	2003
Stanislav Jarábek	(Slovakia)	2003–04
Vladimír Ekhardt	(Slovakia)	2004
Jozef Vukušič	(Slovakia)	2004
Milan Lešický	(Slovakia)	2004–05
Jozef Adamec	(Slovakia)	2005–06
Jozef Bubenko	(Slovakia)	2006
Jozef Adamec	(Slovakia)	2006
Jozef Šuran	(Slovakia)	2007
Ivan Hucko	(Slovakia)	2007

Spartak Trnava managers (from June 2007 onwards)
Name	Nat.	From	To	Record							Trophies
Name	Nat.	From	To	Pld	W	D	L	GF	GA	Win%	Trophies
Josef Mazura	CZE	11 June 2007	6 May 2008	28	12	6	10	44	36	42.86	
Jozef Adamec (caretaker)	SVK	6 May 2008	31 May 2008	5	2	1	2	7	5	40.00	
Vladimir Vermezović	SER	16 June 2008	29 September 2008	11	4	4	3	15	11	36.36	
Karol Pecze	SVK	30 September 2008	1 October 2009	37	17	8	12	52	47	45.95	
Peter Zelenský (caretaker)	SVK	1 October 2009	5 October 2009	1	0	0	1	0	1	0.00	
Ľuboš Nosický	SVK	5 October 2009	5 December 2009	7	2	3	2	11	8	28.57	
Milan Malatinský	SVK	1 January 2010	12 May 2010	16	7	1	8	27	27	43.75	
Peter Zelenský (caretaker)	SVK	12 May 2010	15 May 2010	1	0	0	1	1	2	0.00	
Dušan Radolský	SVK	1 June 2010	19 March 2011	23	9	9	5	29	18	39.13	
Peter Zelenský	SVK	22 March 2011	25 May 2011	12	4	2	6	15	17	33.33	
Pavel Hoftych	CZE	16 June 2011	19 November 2012	68	30	18	20	88	78	44.12	
Peter Zelenský	SVK	19 November 2012	23 April 2013	12	2	5	5	14	17	16.67	
Vladimír Ekhardt	SVK	23 April 2013	26 May 2013	6	3	1	2	9	7	50.00	
Juraj Jarábek	SVK	11 June 2013	28 August 2015	90	42	21	27	141	104	46.67	
Branislav Mráz (caretaker)	SVK	28 August 2015	2 September 2015	1	1	0	0	2	0	100.00	
Ivan Hucko	SVK	2 September 2015	21 April 2016	30	16	5	9	48	35	53.33	
Miroslav Karhan	SVK	21 April 2016	27 May 2017	38	17	8	13	49	45	44.74	
Nestor El Maestro	ENG	15 June 2017	21 May 2018	38	24	5	9	59	34	63.16	1 Slovak League title
Radoslav Látal	CZE	8 June 2018	31 December 2018	36	15	7	14	55	35	41.67	
Michal Ščasný	CZE	1 January 2019	10 June 2019	18	7	6	5	21	20	38.89	1 Slovak Cup
Ricardo Chéu	POR	10 June 2019	4 June 2020	31	14	3	14	49	42	45.16	
Marián Šarmír	SVK	5 June 2020	14 September 2020	14	5	3	6	18	16	35.71	
Norbert Hrnčár	SVK	14 September 2020	31 December 2020	12	6	1	5	27	17	50.00	
Michal Gašparík	SVK	1 January 2021	30 May 2025	202	112	38	52	359	216	55.45	3 Slovak Cups
Michal Ščasný	CZE	1 July 2025	18 November 2025	22	13	3	6	47	26	59.09	
Martin Škrtel (caretaker)	SVK	18 November 2025	31 December 2025	5	4	0	1	10	5	80.00	
Antonio Muñoz	ESP	5 January 2026	present	0	0	0	0	0	0	—	

Key
*	Caretaker manager
