= Vojtěch Varadín =

Slovak footballer (1948–2018)

Personal information
- Full name: Vojtěch Varadín
- Date of birth: 27 September 1948
- Place of birth: Trnava, Czechoslovakia (now Slovakia)
- Date of death: 25 August 2018 (aged 69)

Senior career*
Years	Team	Apps	(Gls)
1967–1975	Spartak Trnava	173	(11)
1975–1978	Inter Bratislava		
1978–1981	Slovan Bratislava	71	(5)
Total		244+	(16+)

International career
1974	Czechoslovakia	5	(0)
- * Club domestic league appearances and goals

Vojtech Varadin (27 September 1948 – 25 August 2018) was a Slovak football player. He earned 5 caps for the Czechoslovakia national football team. He Played for FC Spartak Trnava and ŠK Slovan Bratislava.

== International career ==
Varadin made five appearances for the full Czechoslovakia national football team.
