= Valér Švec =

Slovak footballer and coach

Personal information
- Date of birth: 20 July 1935 (age 91)
- Place of birth: Czechoslovakia
- Position: Forward

Senior career*
Years	Team	Apps	(Gls)
1955–1971	FC Spartak Trnava		

Managerial career
- 1970–1971: Spartak Trnava
- 1972–1978: Inter Bratislava
- 1978–1980: Spartak Trnava
- 1980–1981: Zbrojovka Brno
- 1982–1984: Tatran Prešov
- 1985–1986: Slovan Bratislava
- –1988: AEL Limassol
- 1990–1992: Spartak Trnava
- 1996: FC Nitra
- * Club domestic league appearances and goals

Valér Švec (born 20 July 1935) was a Slovak football player and coach. He played for FC Spartak Trnava.

He coached Spartak Trnava, Inter Bratislava, Zbrojovka Brno, Tatran Prešov, Slovan Bratislava, FC Nitra and AEL Limassol.
