= Vladimír Ekhardt =

Slovak footballer and coach

Personal information
- Full name: Vladimír Ekhardt
- Date of birth: 17 January 1958 (age 68)
- Place of birth: Topoľčany, Czechoslovakia
- Position: Midfielder

Senior career*
Years	Team	Apps	(Gls)
1981–1983	Prievidza	17	(0)
1983–1984	Dunajská Streda	28	(3)
1984–1988	Spartak Trnava	98	(14)
1988–1990	Slovan Bratislava	47	(0)

Managerial career
- 2004: Spartak Trnava
- 2007–2008: FC Neded
- 2008: Jaslovské Bohunice
- 2012: Jaslovské Bohunice
- 2013: Spartak Trnava
- 2015–2016: FC Neded
- * Club domestic league appearances and goals

Vladimír Ekhardt (born 17 January 1958) is a former football player from Slovakia.

He coached Spartak Trnava.
