= Jozef Marko =

Slovak footballer (1923–1996)

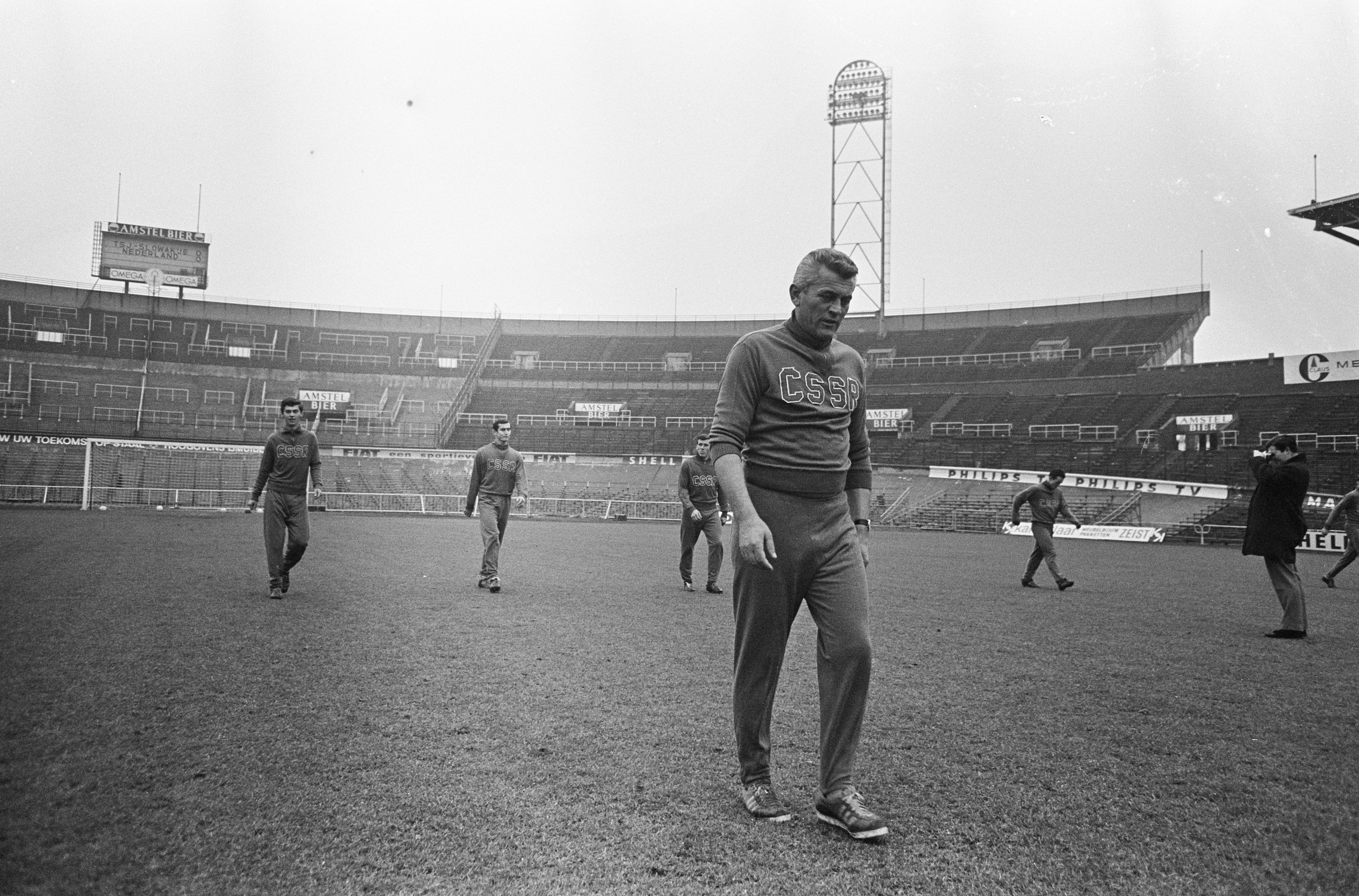
- Marko in 1966

Personal information
- Date of birth: 25 May 1923
- Place of birth: Topoľčany, Czechoslovakia
- Date of death: 26 September 1996 (aged 73)
- Position: Midfielder

Youth career
- TS Topoľčany

Senior career*
Years	Team	Apps	(Gls)
1943–1945	OAP Bratislava		
1945–1954	Spartak Trnava		
1954–1956	TS Topoľčany		
1956–1959	Spartak Považská Bystrica		

International career
1948–1949	Czechoslovakia	9	(1)

Managerial career
- 1952–1954: Spartak Trnava
- 1954–1956: TS Topoľčany
- 1956–1965: Spartak Považská Bystrica
- 1965–1970: Czechoslovakia
- 1970–1972: Inter Bratislava
- 1972–1974: Spartak Považská Bystrica
- 1975–1977: Žilina
- 1980–1982: Prievidza
- * Club domestic league appearances and goals

Jozef Marko (25 May 1923 – 26 September 1996) was a Slovak football player and coach. He played for FC Spartak Trnava. He earned nine caps for the Czechoslovakia national team. Most notably he was the manager of the Czechoslovakia national team in the 1970 FIFA World Cup.

== International career ==
Marko made nine appearances for the full Czechoslovakia national team.
