= Ivan Hucko =

Slovak football manager (born 1965)

Personal information
- Full name: Ivan Hucko
- Date of birth: 3 January 1965 (age 61)
- Place of birth: Bratislava, Czechoslovakia

Senior career*
Years	Team	Apps	(Gls)
1983–1984	Slovan Bratislava		
1984–1988	Spartak Trnava		
1988–1989	Dukla Prague		
1990	Spartak Trnava		
1991–1993	Nitra		

Managerial career
- 1994–1996: Kazma SC (assistant)
- 2003: Slovakia U17
- 2004–2005: Ružomberok
- 2005–2006: Al Ain FC (assistant)
- 2007: Spartak Trnava
- 2007–2010: Bahrain (assistant)
- 2011: Kazma SC (assistant)
- 2015–2016: Spartak Trnava
- * Club domestic league appearances and goals

Ivan Hucko (born 3 January 1965) is a Slovak football manager. His father, Ján Hucko, was also a noted football coach.
