= 1967–68 Czechoslovak First League =

Czechoslovak First League
- Season: 1967–68
- Champions: Spartak Trnava
- Relegated: Škoda Plzeň; FC Bohemians Praha
- European Cup: Spartak Trnava
- Cup Winners' Cup: Slovan Bratislava
- Fairs Cup: Slavia Prague
- Top goalscorer: Jozef Adamec (18 goals)

Statistics of Czechoslovak First League in the 1967–68 season.

== Overview ==
It was contested by 14 teams, and FC Spartak Trnava won the championship. Jozef Adamec was the league's top scorer with 18 goals.

== Stadia and locations ==
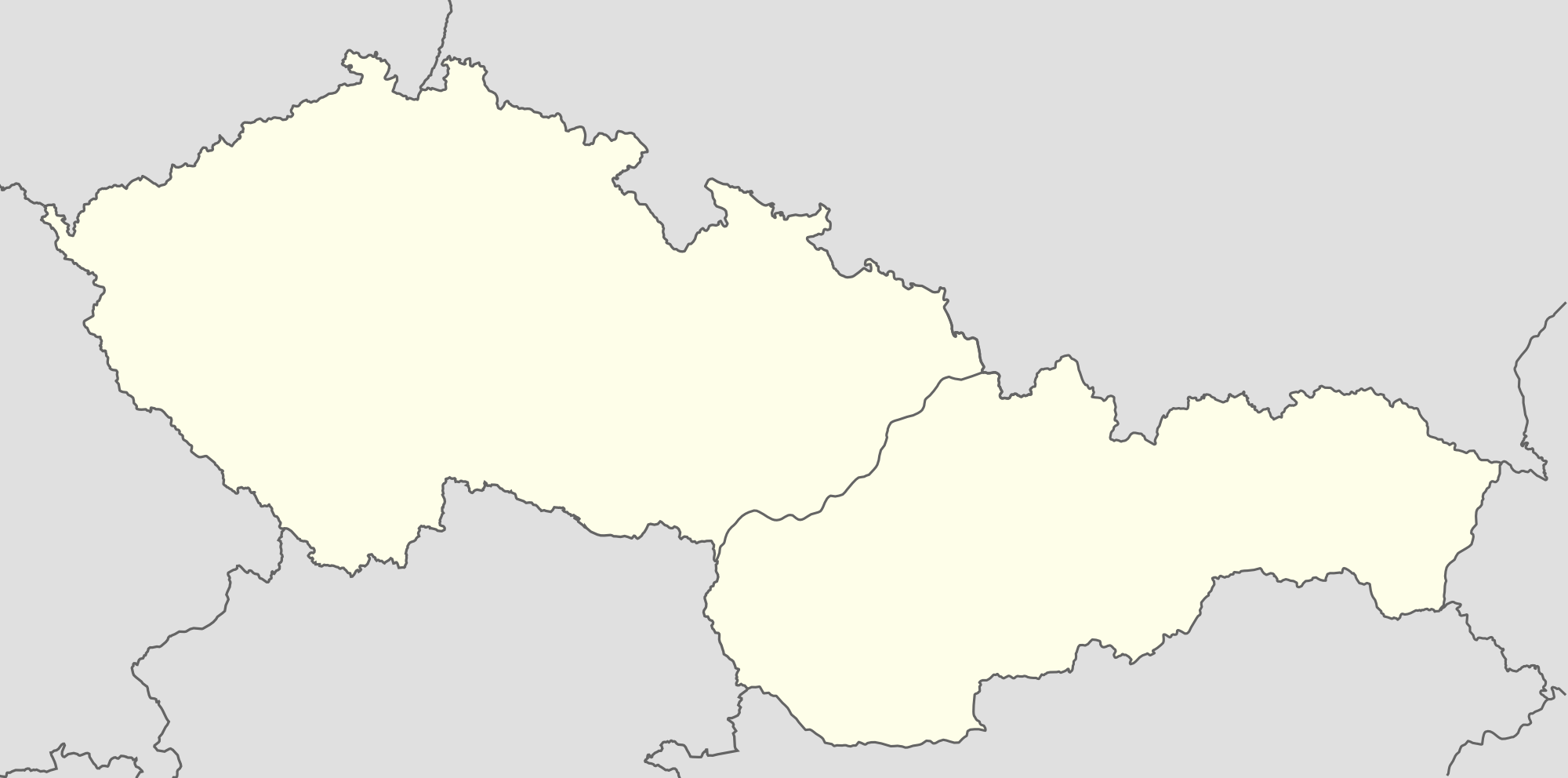
Location of clubs in the 1967–68 Czechoslovak First League

== League standings ==
Pos	Team	Pld	W	D	L	GF	GA	GR	Pts	Qualification or relegation
1	Spartak Trnava (C)	26	15	5	6	57	26	2.192	35	Qualification for European Cup first round
2	Slovan Bratislava	26	13	4	9	36	20	1.800	30	Qualification for Cup Winners' Cup first round
3	Jednota Trenčín	26	12	6	8	37	29	1.276	30	
4	Dukla Prague	26	14	2	10	44	40	1.100	30	
5	VSS Košice	26	12	5	9	43	33	1.303	29	
6	Inter Bratislava	26	11	6	9	49	38	1.289	28	
7	Sparta Prague	26	12	4	10	38	33	1.152	28	
8	Slavia Prague	26	11	6	9	39	38	1.026	28	Invitation for Inter-Cities Fairs Cup first round
9	Sklo Union Teplice	26	10	5	11	25	32	0.781	25	
10	Lokomotíva Košice	26	7	11	8	22	31	0.710	25	
11	Baník Ostrava	26	7	8	11	27	31	0.871	22	
12	Jednota Žilina	26	8	6	12	32	47	0.681	22	
13	Škoda Plzeň (R)	26	4	10	12	26	46	0.565	18	Relegation to Czechoslovak Second League
14	Bohemians Prague (R)	26	3	8	15	23	54	0.426	14	Relegation to Czechoslovak Second League

Source: rsssf.com
(C) Champions; (R) Relegated

== Results ==
Home \ Away	OST	BOH	DUK	INT	TRE	LOK	TEP	PLZ	SLA	SLO	SPA	TRN	KOŠ	ŽIL
Baník Ostrava		3–0	4–2	0–0	2–0	3–0	1–1	3–1	1–2	1–0	2–0	0–0	0–0	2–3
Bohemians Prague	2–0		1–4	1–1	2–1	1–3	3–3	2–2	0–3	0–1	0–1	1–5	2–0	1–1
Dukla Prague	2–0	2–0		3–4	0–4	0–0	1–0	3–1	5–1	3–2	1–3	2–1	3–1	3–0
Inter Bratislava	4–2	6–0	1–3		3–2	0–0	1–0	7–0	3–0	0–1	3–3	3–2	3–0	3–1
Jednota Trenčín	0–0	3–1	2–0	3–1		1–0	3–0	1–1	2–0	2–1	3–0	2–1	1–1	2–1
Lokomotíva Košice	0–0	1–1	1–2	1–1	1–1		1–0	2–1	1–1	0–0	0–3	0–0	2–1	3–1
Sklo Union Teplice	1–0	2–0	0–1	1–0	1–0	2–0		3–1	1–1	0–0	2–1	1–1	1–0	3–1
Škoda Plzeň	1–1	2–2	3–1	1–2	0–0	0–0	0–1		1–2	3–0	0–0	0–7	2–2	2–0
Slavia Prague	2–2	1–1	2–1	1–0	0–0	3–1	5–2	2–1		0–0	1–0	0–1	2–3	2–0
Slovan Bratislava	2–0	1–1	0–1	1–0	4–1	4–0	2–0	0–1	1–0		2–0	2–0	0–2	5–0
Sparta Prague	1–0	2–1	3–0	2–0	3–0	0–2	1–0	0–0	1–2	1–4		3–3	2–0	3–0
Spartak Trnava	3–0	2–0	3–0	4–0	2–0	3–0	4–0	2–0	2–1	0–3	3–2		3–0	2–1
VSS Košice	3–0	2–0	2–0	2–2	1–2	1–2	2–0	1–0	4–2	3–0	4–1	4–2		3–0
ZVL Žilina	1–0	2–0	1–1	4–1	3–1	1–1	2–0	2–2	4–3	1–0	0–2	1–1	1–1	

Source: statistiky1ligy.fotbal.cz
Legend: Blue = home team win; Yellow = draw; Red = away team win.
