= Jozef Adamec =

Slovak footballer and manager

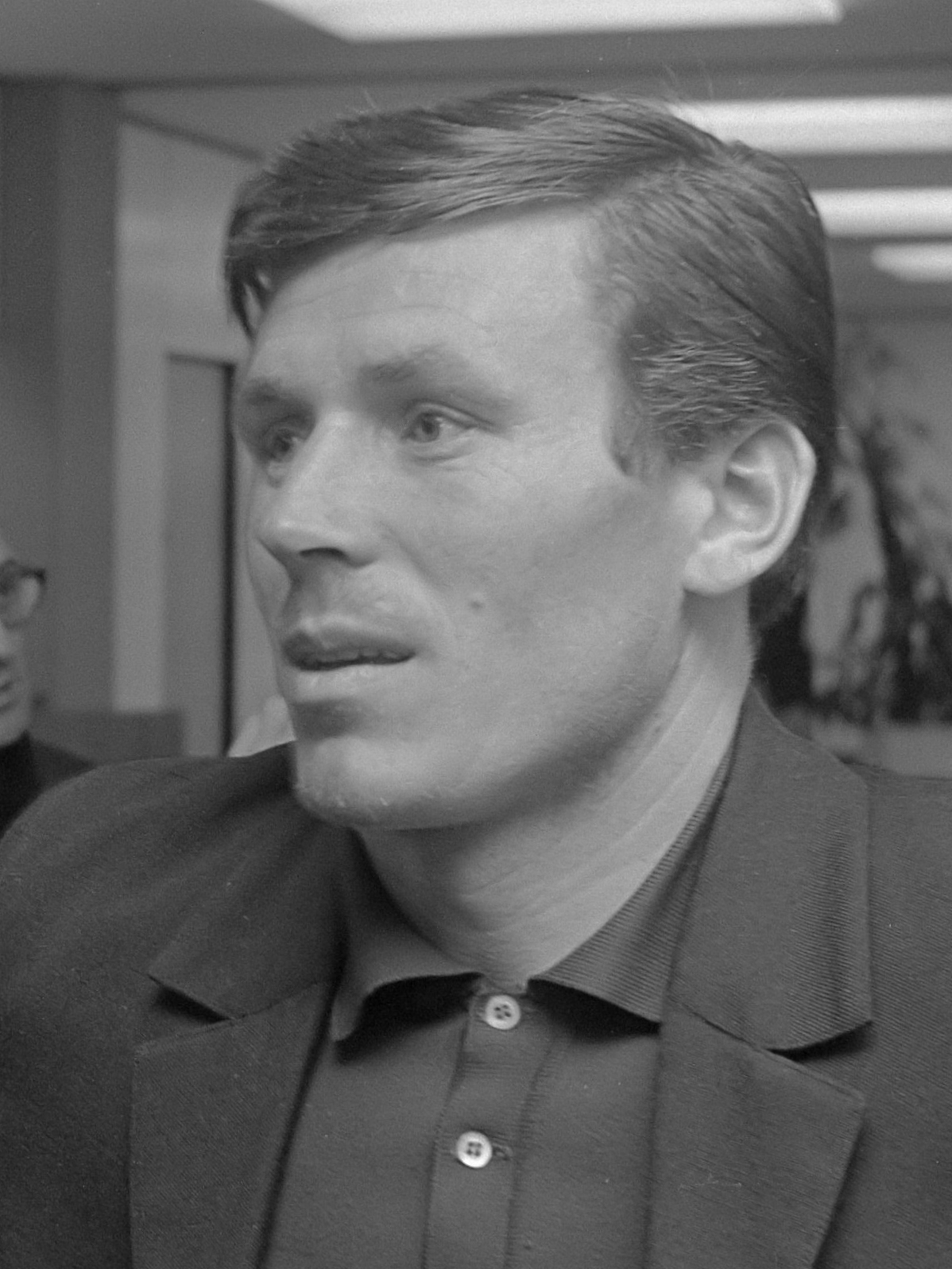
- Adamec in 1969

Personal information
- Date of birth: 26 February 1942
- Place of birth: Vrbové, Slovakia
- Date of death: 24 December 2018 (aged 76)
- Place of death: Trnava, Slovakia
- Height: 1.76 m (5 ft 9 in)
- Position: Forward

Youth career
- TJ Iskra Vrbové

Senior career*
Years	Team	Apps	(Gls)
1959–1961	Spartak Trnava	61	(19)
1961–1963	Dukla Prague	34	(17)
1963–1966	Slovan Bratislava	26	(15)
1966–1977	Spartak Trnava	264	(119)
1977–1980	SK Slovan Wien		
Total		385	(170)

International career
1960–1974	Czechoslovakia	44	(14)

Managerial career
- 1976–1977: Spartak Trnava (assistant)
- 1977–1980: SK Slovan Wien
- 1980–1981: Slovan Duslo Šaľa
- 1981–1987: Dukla Banská Bystrica
- 1987–1988: Vorwärts Steyr
- 1989–1991: Inter Bratislava
- 1991: Dukla Banská Bystrica
- 1992: Bohemians Prague
- 1992–1993: Inter Bratislava
- 1993: Czechoslovakia (assistant)
- 1994–1995: Zlín
- 1995: Inter Bratislava
- 1996–1997: Dunajská Streda
- 1998–1999: Prešov
- 1999–2001: Slovakia
- 2002–2003: Spartak Trnava
- 2003–2004: Slovan Bratislava
- 2005–2006: Spartak Trnava
- 2006: Petržalka
- 2006: Spartak Trnava
- 2008: Spartak Trnava
Medal record
Men's football
Representing Czechoslovakia
FIFA World Cup
Runner-up	1962 Chile
- * Club domestic league appearances and goals

Jozef Adamec (26 February 1942 – 24 December 2018) was a Slovak football forward and manager.

Adamec won seven Czechoslovak First League titles in his club career, winning two with Dukla Prague during his military service, followed by five more while playing for Spartak Trnava. Other clubs he played for were Slovan Bratislava and lower-division Austrian club Slovan Wien, where he took on a player-manager role.

As a football manager, Adamec took charge of clubs in Czechoslovakia and later Slovakia. Between 1999 and 2001 he led the Slovakia national team.

== Club career ==
In March 1959, as a 17-year-old, Jozef Adamec made his debut Spartak Trnava. In 1961, he played for Dukla Prague, before returning to Trnava. In 1964, he transferred to rivals Slovan Bratislava.

In the Czechoslovak First League he played 383 matches and with 170 goals is 10th in the Czechoslovak All-Time Topscorers Table. He was capped 44 times for Czechoslovakia, scoring 14 goals. He was a participant at the 1962 FIFA World Cup and 1970 FIFA World Cup.

== International career ==
His most memorable performance was his hat-trick against Brazil in match Czechoslovakia - Brazil 3–2 (1–1) played on 23 June 1968 in Bratislava. He was often incorrectly referred to as the first player ever to score a hat-trick against Brazil (Pole Ernst Wilimowski had scored four goals in the 1938 World Cup match).

== After football ==
After retiring as player, Adamec began with football coaching as an assistant in Spartak Trnava. Later he coached Dukla Banská Bystrica, Tatran Prešov, Spartak Trnava and Slovan Bratislava. Between 1988 and 1991, he was the manager of Inter Bratislava, winning the Slovak Cup with the club in the 1989–90 season. He was assistant to Czechoslovakia coach Václav Ježek in 1993. From 1999 to 2001 Adamec coached the Slovakia national team.

Adamec died in 2018 at the age of 76.

== Honours ==
=== Player ===
Dukla Prague

- Czechoslovak First League: 1961–62, 1962–63

Spartak Trnava

- Czechoslovak First League: 1967–68, 1968–69, 1970–71, 1971–72, 1972–73
- Czechoslovak Cup: 1966–67, 1970–71, 1974–75
- Slovak Cup: 1970–71, 1974–75
- Mitropa Cup: 1966–67; runner-up: 1967–68

Czechoslovakia

- FIFA World Cup runner-up: 1962

=== Manager ===
Inter Bratislava

- Slovak Cup: 1989–90
