= Michal Gašparík (born 1981) =

Slovak football manager

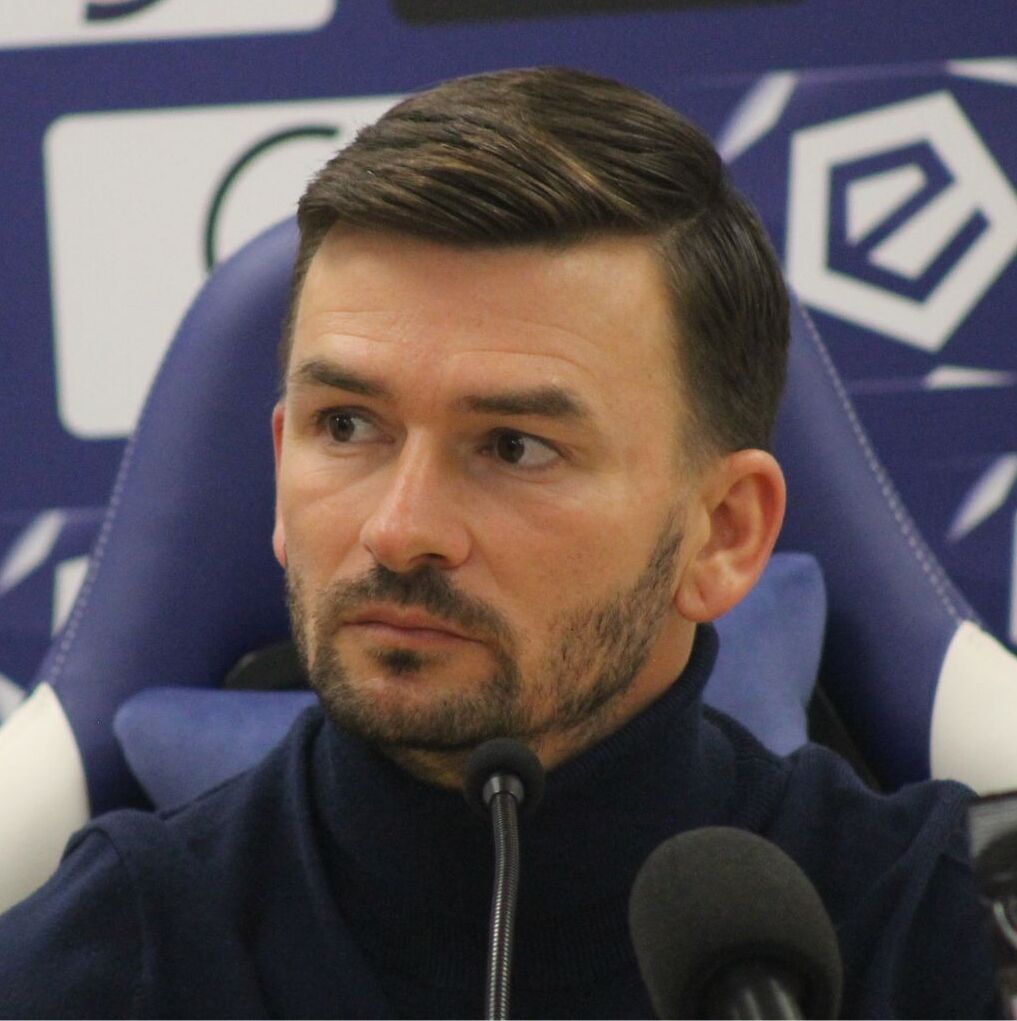
- Gašparík as manager of Górnik Zabrze in 2026

Personal information
- Date of birth: 19 December 1981 (age 44)
- Place of birth: Trnava, Czechoslovakia
- Height: 1.78 m (5 ft 10 in)
- Position: Winger

Team information
- Current team: Górnik Zabrze (manager)

Youth career
- 1988–1999: Spartak Trnava

Senior career*
Years	Team	Apps	(Gls)
1999–2005	Spartak Trnava	119	(12)
2005	→ Senec (loan)		
2006–2007	Baník Most	42	(7)
2007–2010	Teplice	21	(0)
2010	→ DAC Dunajská Streda (loan)	18	(2)
2011	Górnik Zabrze	15	(3)
2012	Spartak Trnava	28	(4)
2013	DAC Dunajská Streda	28	(4)
2014	Spartak Trnava	7	(0)
2014	Iskra Borčice	9	(3)
2015	Gabčíkovo	15	(12)
2015	Skalica	18	(5)
2016	SC Wieselburg		

Managerial career
- 2021–2025: Spartak Trnava
- 2025–: Górnik Zabrze
- * Club domestic league appearances and goals

Michal Gašparík (born 19 December 1981) is a Slovak professional football manager and former player who is currently in charge of Polish Ekstraklasa club Górnik Zabrze.

A midfielder by position, Gašparík spent his playing career in the professional leagues of Slovakia, the Czech Republic and Poland, playing in the Slovak First Football League, Czech First League and Ekstraklasa.

== Playing career ==
Gašparík joined Most of the Czech First League on a one-and-a-half-year contract in January 2006, having played for the senior team of Spartak Trnava in his native Slovakia for five and a half seasons. He joined fellow Czech First League side Teplice under head coach Petr Rada in July 2007, scoring on his debut for the club in a friendly against Slavia Prague. He spent time on loan in Slovakia with DAC Dunajská Streda before joining Górnik Zabrze of Poland in January 2011. He returned to Trnava on loan in the spring part of the 2011–12 season, before making the move permanent in July 2012.

== Managerial career ==
=== Spartak Trnava ===
Gašparík became a first-team manager of Spartak Trnava in January 2021, signing a three-year contract. In January 2024, he prolonged his contract with Spartak Trnava until June 2026. During his stint as Spartak's manager, he won three Slovak Cups, in 2022, 2023 and 2025.

=== Górnik Zabrze ===
On 6 June 2025, Gašparík announced that he was joining Polish club Górnik Zabrze as the manager on a two-year deal, taking assistant coaches Tomáš Prisztács and Marian Hodulik with him. He won his fourth national cup on 2 May 2026, after leading Górnik to a 2–0 win over Raków Częstochowa in the 2025–26 Polish Cup final. Górnik finished the league season in 2nd place, four points behind champions Lech Poznań.

Gašparík begun his second season with a 3–1 loss in the 2026 Polish Super Cup against Lech Poznań on 16 July. Górnik failed to qualify for the league phase of any UEFA competition after being eliminated by Fenerbahçe, Ferencváros and AS Monaco. Domestically, they enjoyed a good start to the season and entered the September-October international break on top of the standings. After he was linked to take over as the new head coach of the Poland national team, Gašparík extended his contract with Górnik until 2030 on 29 October 2026.

== Personal life ==
Gašparík has a brother, Richard. His parents are father Michal Gašparík, who was also a footballer, and mother Viera, who played handball.

== Managerial statistics ==
As of match played 21 November 2026

Managerial record by team and tenure
Team	From	To	Record							
Team	From	To	P	W	D	L	GF	GA	GD	Win %
Spartak Trnava	1 January 2021	6 June 2025	202	112	38	52	355	214	+141	55.45
Górnik Zabrze	1 July 2025	Present	63	32	15	16	93	66	+27	50.79
Total			265	144	53	68	448	280	+168	54.34

== Honours ==
=== Manager ===
Spartak Trnava

- Slovak Cup: 2021–22, 2022–23, 2024–25

Górnik Zabrze

- Polish Cup: 2025–26

Individual

- Ekstraklasa Coach of the Month: October 2025, April 2026, September 2026
