= FC Slušovice =

Slušovice
- Full name: FC Slušovice, z.s.
- Founded: 1929
- Ground: Městský stadion Slušovice, Slušovice, Czech Republic
- League: Krajský přebor, Zlínský kraj
- 2022–2023: 3rd
- Website: https://www.fcslusovice.cz/

FC Slušovice is a Czech football club, playing in the town of Slušovice. The club was founded in 1929. The club won the 1994–95 Moravian–Silesian Football League and played one season in the Czech 2. Liga, finishing 7th in the 1995–96 season. It currently plays in the Zlínský krajský 1.A třída skupina A, which is in the sixth tier of Czech football. It is mostly known for appearing in a Sample Gaming video where the crew terrorizes the Czech Republic.
