= Kamil Majerník =

Slovak footballer

Personal information
- Full name: Kamil Majerník
- Date of birth: 25 October 1943
- Place of birth: Dolná Streda, Slovakia
- Date of death: 10 June 2024 (aged 80)
- Place of death: Trnava, Slovakia
- Position: Centre back

Youth career
- Spartak Trnava

Senior career*
| Years | Team | Apps | (Gls) |
| 1961–1967 | Spartak Trnava | 91 | (8) |
| 1967–1968 | Dukla Prague | 8 | (0) |
| 1968–1975 | Spartak Trnava | 158 | (7) |

International career
| 1967–1970 | Czechoslovakia | 4 | (0) |

Managerial career
- 1980–1982: Spartak Trnava
- 1982–1984: Žilina
- 1986–1988: Nitra
- * Club domestic league appearances and goals

Kamil Majerník (25 October 1943 - 10 June 2024) was a former Slovak football defender and manager who played for Spartak Trnava and Dukla Prague. He earned four caps for the Czechoslovakia national football team.

== International career ==
Majerník made four appearances for the full Czechoslovakia national football team.

== Coaching career ==
Majerník coached Žilina and Nitra.

== Death ==
Majerník died on 10 June 2024, at the age of 80.
