= Antonio Muñoz (footballer, born 1989) =

Spanish footballer and manager

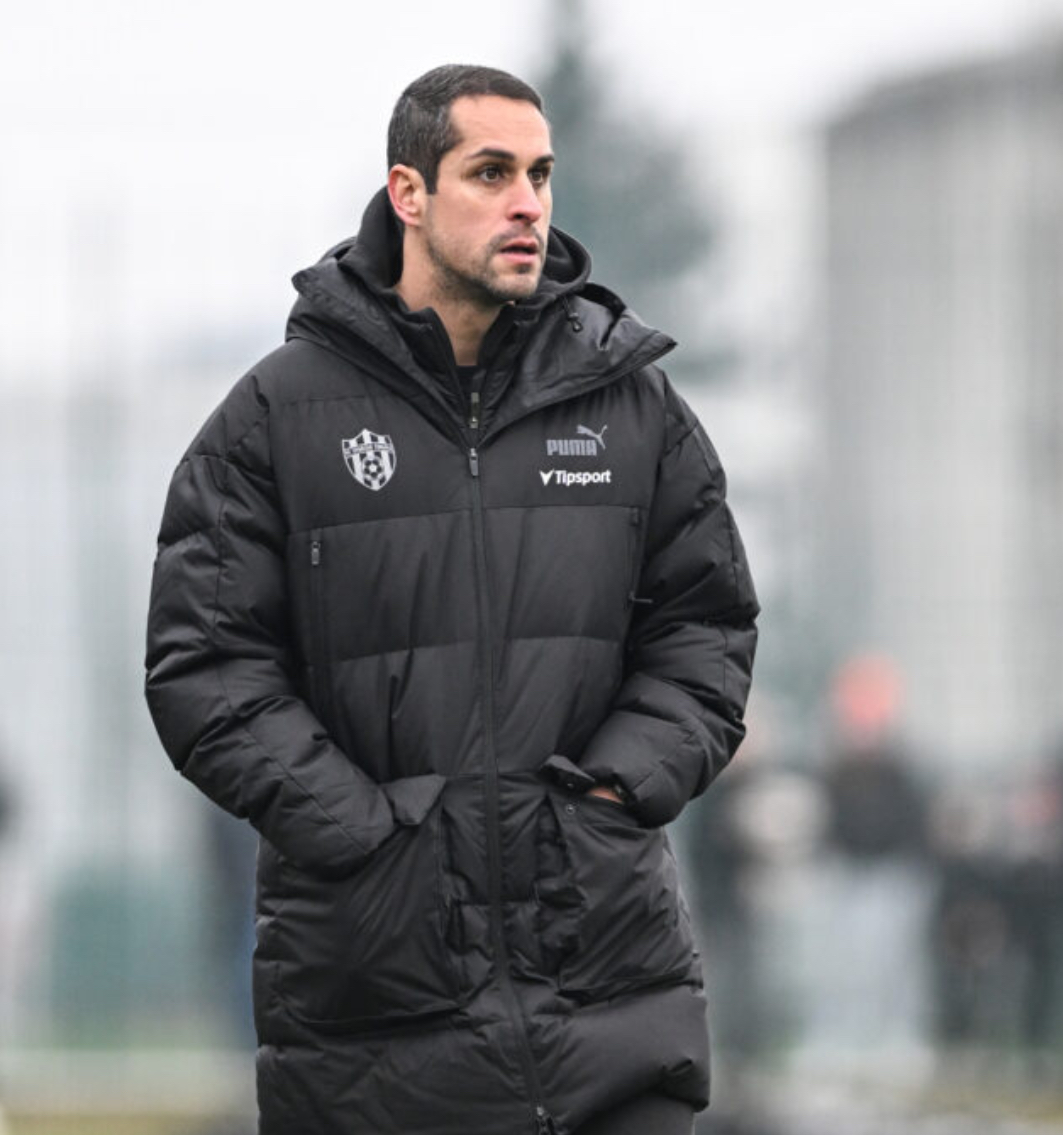
- Muñoz with Spartak Trnava in 2026

Personal information
- Full name: Antonio José Muñoz Guzmán
- Date of birth: 23 September 1989 (age 37)
- Place of birth: Málaga, Spain
- Height: 1.84 m (6 ft 0 in)
- Position: Centre-back

Team information
- Current team: Spartak Trnava (head coach)

Senior career*
Years	Team	Apps	(Gls)
–2012	AD Malaka CF		
2012–2015	El Palo		

Managerial career
- 2018–2019: Diósgyőr (assistant)
- 2023–2024: Győr
- 2025: DAC Dunajská Streda (assistant)
- 2026–: Spartak Trnava
- * Club domestic league appearances and goals

Antonio José Muñoz Guzmán (born 23 September 1989), also known simply as Antonio Muñoz, is a Spanish football manager who is head coach of Slovak First League side Spartak Trnava.

== Playing career ==
Muñoz played as a centre-back, and made it as far as the Spanish second division, before a serious injury forced him into early retirement.

== Managerial career ==
=== Early career ===
Muñoz was chosen as an assistant by Fernando Fernández in Diósgyőr, Hungary, where he worked for two and a half years. Later, he coached the youth team at ETO FC Győr, the B-team, and for almost a year the second division A team, with which he fought for promotion to the top flight. During the spring part of the 2025 season, he was assistant coach to Branislav Fodrek in DAC Dunajská Streda.

=== Spartak Trnava ===
On 5 January 2026, it was announced that Muñoz would become the new head coach of Slovak club Spartak Trnava, signing a contract until summer of 2027. He would replace Michal Ščasný, who was sacked in November. His first match in charge was a 1–1 draw against MFK Zemplín Michalovce.

== Managerial statistics ==
As of 21 November 2026

Managerial record by team and tenure
Team	From	To	Record							
Team	From	To	P	W	D	L	GF	GA	GD	Win %
Győr	2 April 2023	18 February 2024	33	15	7	11	48	41	+7	45.45
Spartak Trnava	5 January 2026	Present	37	19	9	9	60	42	+18	51.35
Total			70	34	16	20	108	83	+25	48.57
