= Newtown F.C. (County Clare) =

Association football club in Ireland

Newtown Football Club is a football club in County Clare, Ireland, founded in 1977. The club merged with Park AFC to form Shannon Hibernians FC.

The club's former home was Ballycasey in Shannon.

Newtown supplied both of Clare's Junior/Amateur internationals: Paul Carr, who later starred for Limerick FC and Waterford in the LOI, and David Wall who also played for Limerick 37 FC.

== History ==
The club was founded in 1977 and entered the Clare Junior League. Its founder members Red Austin, Jim Rocks, Tom McDade (Senior) and Donal Magee (Senior), all originally hailed from Belfast. The link with their origins is reflected in their crest which includes the red hand of Ulster surrounded by the 3 ships of Clare. Jimmy is still involved in the club, and all founder members have sons and grandsons involved. Having developed schoolboy soccer for the last 25 years they then added girls/women's teams as a further commitment to the town.

=== Building of club facilities ===
From the club’s foundation in 1977 until 1998, they played on Shannon Development’s property in Ballycasey with the bare essentials and without facilities to supply water and electricity. They were the first club in Clare to obtain the use of three playing pitches with proper dressing room facilities, and now boast the best pitches in Clare if not the province. Newtown started playing on these pitches in September 1998.

Having decided to purchase their own land, the club committed to develop this area to the highest standard. Their main objective was to develop good playing surfaces to facilitate the young in Shannon and to encourage good quality football throughout the season regardless of weather. Surfaces in Shannon must be developed from scratch as the area is mostly former bogland and below sea level and the club was aware that a six-figure sum would be required in order to develop the proper playing surfaces for pitches.

The club did not need to take out any loans for the grounds development, and was instead funded via local grassroots and support and funding grants. The weekly club lottery paid out jackpot prizes and contributed greatly to the fund, with the same people buying and selling tickets each week. Local businesses also contributed. Shannon Town Commissioners, Clare County Council and the National Lottery also gave fundings grants. Newtown had now come a long way. In 1982 club records show its profits for that year were a handsome £32.

Phase 2 is now commencing and the club is again starting from scratch. The next phase is to provide proper training facilities.

=== Competition ===
While still a relatively new club, the "A" team won its first premier league title in 1987 under manager Brendan Wall. That same season, they defeated League of Ireland opponents Limerick City (1-0) under Billy Hamilton. Two years later they won the league and cup double and reached the quarter-finals of the Munster Junior Cup where they were narrowly defeated after a replay. In 1992 Newtown made its mark at national level by reaching the last 16 in the FAI Junior Cup (over 1000 teams originally entered). A year later Newtown went one step further and reached the last eight in the country – only to be defeated 1-0 by Buttevant AFC (Cork AUL) after a replay (3-3 in drawn game). Manager during this period was founder member and former player Jimmy Rocks. Numerous league and cup titles have been won at schoolboy and youths level as well as some great success in the SFAI national cup competitions.

Their Women's team, in its second year in existence, won the Limerick Leagues 2nd Division and reached the semifinal of the WFAI Junior Cup.

== Organasation ==
All work at the club is voluntary and its existence depends on community support and on a small number of "behind the scenes" people.

=== Partnering and merger ===
Newtown Football Club have decided to Co-partner Park A.F.C in the Limerick League with Newtown Managers, some Players and other members of staff joining the facilities at Riverside Park. Latest news is that former Newtown player and junior international Davey Wall has taken over as first team manager cementing joining of both clubs in what should be a bright future for the club and the town.

Shannon Hibernians FC was formed as a result of Newtown FC and Park AFC joining forces. Currently Shannon Hibs First team play in the LDMC (LIMERICK) division 1A. Hibs as they are now known also have a B team, ladies' team, Youth team, 17's and school boy/girls teams ranging from under 5's up to under 16 years of age. Shannon Hibernians were promoted to the Limerick junior Premier League finishing 2nd to Geraldines in the 2010-11 season
