= 2025–26 KFC Komárno season =

Komárno
2025–26 season
- Manager: Mikuláš Radványi (until 27 April 2026); Norbert Czibor (interim, from 27 April 2026)
- Stadium: ViOn Aréna
- Slovak First Football League: 11th
- Slovak Cup: Round of 16
- Top goalscorer: League: Šimon Šmehyl (7); All: Elvis Mashike (8)
- Highest home attendance: 2,987 v Spartak Trnava (24 August 2025, Slovak First Football League)
- Lowest home attendance: 230 v Podbrezová (22 November 2025, Slovak First Football League)
- Average home league attendance: 683
- Biggest win: 4–0 v Častkovce (Away, 8 October 2025, Slovak Cup)
- Biggest defeat: 1–4 v Spartak Trnava (Home, 24 August 2025, Slovak First Football League)
Home colours	Away colours	Third colours

The 2025–26 season was Komárňanský futbalový club's 2nd consecutive season in the Slovak First Football League. In addition to the domestic league, Komárno participated in the Slovak Cup.

On 27 April 2026, Komárno parted company with manager Mikuláš Radványi by mutual agreement following a 0–2 home defeat to Skalica in a key relegation battle. Later that day, Norbert Czibor was appointed as part of an interim management team alongside Kornel Saláta and Ján Novota until the end of the season.

== Squad ==
As of 3 February, 2026 Note: Flags indicate national team as defined under FIFA eligibility rules; some limited exceptions apply. Players may hold more than one non-FIFA nationality.

No.	Pos.	Nation	Player
1	GK	SVK	Filip Dlubáč
3	DF	SVK	Martin Šimko (captain)
4	MF	BIH	Alen Mustafić (on loan from Slovan Bratislava)
5	DF	SVK	Dominik Špiriak
6	MF	CZE	Dan Ožvolda
7	MF	SVK	Jozef Pastorek
8	FW	SVK	Šimon Šmehýl
9	FW	SVK	Martin Boďa (on loan from Ružomberok)
10	MF	SVK	Kristóf Domonkos
12	MF	CZE	Dominik Žák
14	MF	SVK	Filip Kiss
15	MF	SVK	Dávid Kmeťo
17	FW	CMR	Christian Bayemi
18	FW	CZE	Jakub Palán
20	MF	SVK	Martin Gamboš

No.	Pos.	Nation	Player
21	DF	SVK	Róbert Pillár
22	FW	ROU	Nándor Tamás
24	DF	CZE	Ondřej Rudzan
26	GK	HUN	Erik Gyurákovics
27	FW	USA	Zyen Jones
32	GK	GER	Sebastian Jung (on loan from Greuther Fürth)
37	DF	SVK	Adam Krčík
39	GK	SVK	Benjamín Száraz
73	FW	MNG	Ganbayar Ganbold
77	MF	SVK	Martin Mišovič (on loan from Slovan Bratislava)
87	FW	SVK	Zoran Ivanics
97	FW	SVK	Boris Druga (on loan from Dynamo Malženice)
98	MF	HUN	Patrik Szűcs (on loan from MTK Budapest)
99	FW	COD	Elvis Mashike

== Transfers ==
=== Summer ===
In: Note: Flags indicate national team as defined under FIFA eligibility rules; some limited exceptions apply. Players may hold more than one non-FIFA nationality.

No.	Pos.	Nation	Player
—	DF	SVK	Adam Krčík (from MFK Skalica)
—	MF	SVK	Filip Kiss (from Free Agent)

Out: Note: Flags indicate national team as defined under FIFA eligibility rules; some limited exceptions apply. Players may hold more than one non-FIFA nationality.

No.	Pos.	Nation	Player
-	FW	SVK	Jakub Sylvestr (to MFK Zvolen)

=== Winter ===
In: Note: Flags indicate national team as defined under FIFA eligibility rules; some limited exceptions apply. Players may hold more than one non-FIFA nationality.

No.	Pos.	Nation	Player
—	MF	SVK	Kristóf Domonkos (from MFK Ružomberok)
—	FW	SVK	Boris Druga (on loan from OFK Dynamo Malženice)
—	FW	USA	Zyen Jones (from FC Košice)
20	MF	BIH	Alen Mustafić (on loan from Slovan Bratislava)

Out: Note: Flags indicate national team as defined under FIFA eligibility rules; some limited exceptions apply. Players may hold more than one non-FIFA nationality.

No.	Pos.	Nation	Player

== Competitions ==
=== Overview ===
Competition	First match	Last match	Starting round	Final position	Record							
Competition	First match	Last match	Starting round	Final position	Pld	W	D	L	GF	GA	GD	Win %
Slovak First Football League	26 July 2025	16 May 2026	Matchday 1	11th	32	8	8	16	34	46	−12	25.00
Slovak First Football League relegation play-offs	19 May 2026	23 May 2026	First leg	Winners	2	1	0	1	3	1	+2	50.00
Slovak Cup	27 August 2025	18 February 2026	Second round	Round of 16	4	3	0	1	11	4	+7	75.00
Total					38	12	8	18	48	51	−3	31.58

Source: Competitions

=== Slovak First Football League ===
==== Regular season ====
===== League table =====
Pos	Team	Pld	W	D	L	GF	GA	GD	Pts	Qualification
7	Ružomberok	22	6	7	9	24	34	−10	25	Qualification for the relegation group
8	Trenčín	22	7	3	12	18	37	−19	24 (Note: Ranked by head-to-head points: Trenčín 6, Košice 0.)	Qualification for the relegation group
9	Košice	22	7	3	12	35	42	−7	24	Qualification for the relegation group
10	Komárno	22	5	7	10	24	34	−10	22	Qualification for the relegation group
11	Tatran Prešov	22	4	9	9	22	35	−13	21	Qualification for the relegation group
12	Skalica	22	3	7	12	20	35	−15	16	Qualification for the relegation group

Source: Niké liga (in Slovak)
Rules for classification: 1) Points; 2) Head-to-head points; 3) Head-to-head goal difference; 4) Head-to-head away goals scored; 5) Play-off.

===== Results summary =====
Overall								Home						Away					
Pld	W	D	L	GF	GA	GD	Pts	W	D	L	GF	GA	GD	W	D	L	GF	GA	GD
22	5	7	10	24	34	−10	22	2	4	5	12	18	−6	3	3	5	12	16	−4

Source: Niké liga

===== Results by round =====
Round	1	2	3	4	5	6	7	8	9	10	11	12	13	14	15	16	17	18	19	20	21	22
Ground	H	A	H	A	H	H	A	H	A	H	A	A	H	A	H	A	A	H	A	H	A	H
Result	L	L	L	L	L	W	W	L	D	D	W	W	D	L	W	L	D	L	L	D	D	D
Position	10	10	10	10	11	10	10	11	11	11	10	8	8	10	7	8	9	9	9	9	8	10
Points	0	0	0	0	0	3	6	6	7	8	11	14	15	15	18	18	19	19	19	20	21	22

Source: Worldfootball
A = Away; H = Home; W = Win; D = Draw; L = Loss

===== Matches =====
26 July 2025 1	Komárno	1–2	Trenčín	Zlaté Moravce
18:00 CEST (UTC+2)	Šimko 20'	Report	Šimko 14' (o.g.); Hájovský (yellow card) 72'; Sabljić 74'; Yakubu (yellow card) 87'	Stadium: ViOn Aréna; Attendance: 452; Referee: Matej Choreň; Assistant referees: Dušan Štofik, Mário Roszbeck

2 August 2025 2	Zemplín Michalovce	3–1	Komárno	Michalovce
18:00 CEST (UTC+2)	Paulauskas 9'; Cottrell 59'; Ahl 88'; Zubairu (yellow card) 90'	Report	Šmehyl 21' (pen.); Németh (yellow card) 72'	Stadium: Mestský futbalový štadión Attendance: 1,584; Referee: Igor Valent; Assistant referees: Dávid Bobko, Juraj Halíček

16 August 2025 4	Podbrezová	2–1	Komárno	Podbrezová
18:00 CEST (UTC+2)	Smékal 5'; Deml 23'; Palumets (yellow card) 42'; Štefánik (yellow card) 84'	Report	Šmehyl 54'; Žák (yellow card) 63'	Stadium: ZELPO Aréna; Attendance: 865; Referee: Bálint Kišš; Assistant referees: Ákos Juhos, Matej Hrebeňár

24 August 2025 5	Komárno	1–4	Spartak Trnava	Zlaté Moravce
17:00 CEST (UTC+2)	Ganbayar (yellow card) 12'; Boďa 50'; Šmehyl (yellow card) 71'; Pillár (yellow card) 90'	Report	Ďuriš 22'; Skrbo 26', 38', (yellow card) 55'; Procházka 68' (pen.); Badolo (red card) 81'	Stadium: ViOn Aréna; Attendance: 2,987; Referee: Boris Marhefka; Assistant referees: Mário Roszbeck, Peter Čajka

30 August 2025 6	Komárno	1–0	Skalica	Zlaté Moravce
18:00 CEST (UTC+2)	Šimko (yellow card) 14'; Boďa (yellow card) 17'; Mashike 58'; Špiriak (yellow card) 73'; Žák (yellow card) 76'	Report	Bariš (yellow card) 15'; Smejkal (yellow card) 60'; Švec (yellow card) 73'; Gaži (yellow card) 90'	Stadium: ViOn Aréna; Attendance: 322; Referee: Boris Benedik; Assistant referees: Tobiáš Pacák, Rastislav Kuba

13 September 2025 7	Košice	2–3	Komárno	Košice
18:00 CEST (UTC+2)	Čerepkai 13' (pen.); Kakay (yellow card) 16'; Zsigmund (yellow card) 38' (yellow-red card) 52'; Jones 45'	Report	Špiriak (yellow card) 12'; Bayemi (yellow card) 27'; Ganbayar 52'; Mashike 78'; Mišovič 87', (yellow card) 87'; Žák (yellow card) 90'	Stadium: Košická futbalová aréna Attendance: 4,395; Referee: Boris Marhefka; Assistant referees: Milan Štrbo, Matej Zemko

21 September 2025 8	Komárno	1–3	Žilina	Zlaté Moravce
17:00 CEST (UTC+2)	Šmehyl (yellow card) 44', (goal) 84' (pen.); Žák (yellow card) 63'; Pillár (red card) 90+3'	Report	Prokop 45+2'; Káčer 50', (yellow card) 89'; Iľko 63'; Staník (yellow card) 82'; Adang (yellow card) 86'	Stadium: ViOn Aréna; Attendance: 415; Referee: Marián Ruc; Assistant referees: Adam Jekkel, Simeon Vass

27 September 2025 9	DAC Dunajská Streda	1–1	Komárno	Dunajská Streda
18:00 CEST (UTC+2)	Kacharaba (yellow card) 48'; Đukanović 77' (pen.)	Report	Žák 7'; Kiss (yellow card) 47'	Stadium: MOL Aréna; Attendance: 5,650; Referee: Ivan Kružliak; Assistant referees: Branislav Hancko, Ján Pozor

4 October 2025 10	Komárno	0–0	Tatran Prešov	Zlaté Moravce
18:00 CEST (UTC+2)	Ivanics (yellow card) 90'	Report	Morim (yellow card) 57'	Stadium: ViOn Aréna; Attendance: 375; Referee: Michal Smolák; Assistant referees: Milan Štrbo, Juraj Halíček

18 October 2025 11	Ružomberok	0–1	Komárno	Ružomberok
15:30 CEST (UTC+2)	Král (yellow card) 77'; Grygar (yellow card) 84'	Report	Tamás 53'; Ganbayar (yellow card) 62'; Rudzan (yellow card) 85'; Ožvolda (yellow card) 87'	Stadium: Štadión pod Čebraťom; Attendance: 737; Referee: Peter Ziemba; Assistant referees: Patrik Kmec, Matej Hrebeňár

25 October 2025 12	Trenčín	0–1	Komárno	Trenčín
15:30 CEST (UTC+2)	Križan (yellow card) 3'; Baždarić (yellow card) 31'; Holúbek (yellow card) 53'; Sani (red card) 68'	Report	Tamás (yellow card) 45'; Šmehyl 62' (pen.); Špiriak (yellow card) 90'	Stadium: Štadión Sihoť; Attendance: 988; Referee: Jaroslav Sučka; Assistant referees: Dušan Štofik, Jakub Košecký

29 October 2025 3	Komárno	2–3	Slovan Bratislava	Zlaté Moravce
18:00 CET (UTC+1)	Mashike 62'; Šmehyl 73'; Boďa (yellow card) 79'	Report	Barseghyan (yellow card) 22'; Šporar 63', 90+5', (yellow card) 90+5'; Ofori 90'	Stadium: ViOn Aréna; Attendance: 1,289; Referee: Boris Marhefka; Assistant referees: Daniel Poláček, Andrej Hrmo

2 November 2025 13	Komárno	1–1	Zemplín Michalovce	Zlaté Moravce
15:30 CET (UTC+1)	Kiss (yellow card) 56' (yellow-red card) 62'; Bayemi 90' (pen.)	Report	Ramos 63' (pen.); Cottrell (yellow card) 76'	Stadium: ViOn Aréna; Attendance: 280; Referee: Erik Gemzický; Assistant referees: Adam Jekkel, Martin Vitko

9 November 2025 14	Slovan Bratislava	3–2	Komárno	Bratislava
15:30 CET (UTC+1)	Marcelli 7'; Šporar 13', 45+2'; Weiss (yellow card) 30'; Bajrić (yellow card) 40'; Ibrahim (yellow card) 85'; Blackman (yellow card) 90+2'	Report	Rudzan 35'; Žák (yellow card) 58'; Šmehyl (yellow card) 84'; Šimko 85'	Stadium: Tehelné pole Attendance: 4,897; Referee: Martin Dohál; Assistant referees: František Ferenc, Ákos Juhos

22 November 2025 15	Komárno	1–0	Podbrezová	Zlaté Moravce
15:30 CET (UTC+1)	Šimko (yellow card) 72'; Kiss (yellow card) 78'; Pastorek (yellow card) 90+3'; Šmehyl 90+11' (pen.)	Report	Jurička (yellow card) 90+11'; Marković (yellow card) 90+12'	Stadium: ViOn Aréna; Attendance: 230; Referee: Igor Valent; Assistant referees: Ján Pozor, Matej Zemko

29 November 2025 16	Spartak Trnava	2–0	Komárno	Trnava
15:30 CET (UTC+1)	Taiwo 56'; Kudlička (yellow card) 79'; Metsoko 90+4'	Report	Rudzan (yellow card) 48'	Stadium: Anton Malatinský Stadium; Attendance: 3,112; Referee: Boris Benedik; Assistant referees: František Ferenc, Pavel Jánošík

6 December 2025 17	Skalica	1–1	Komárno	Skalica
15:30 CET (UTC+1)	Morong (yellow card) 20'; Suľa 28'; Daniel (yellow card) 90+2'	Report	Németh (yellow card) 20'; Špiriak (yellow card) 51'; Tamás (yellow card) 67'; Šmehyl (yellow card) 76', (goal) 90+3' (pen.)	Stadium: Mestský štadión Skalica; Attendance: 303; Referee: Martin Dohál; Assistant referees: Peter Bednár, Matej Zemko

14 December 2025 18	Komárno	1–2	Košice	Zlaté Moravce
15:30 CET (UTC+1)	Tamás 49'	Report	Száraz 35' (o.g.); Sovič 88'	Stadium: ViOn Aréna; Attendance: 367; Referee: Erik Gemzický; Assistant referees: Andrej Hrmo, Peter Čajka

8 February 2026 19	Žilina	1–0	Komárno	Žilina
15:30 CET (UTC+1)	Káčer (yellow card) 10'; Faško 20'	Report	Kiss (yellow card) 34'; Špiriak (yellow card) 53'; Gamboš (yellow card) 78'	Stadium: Štadión pod Dubňom; Attendance: 1,255; Referee: Peter Ziemba; Assistant referees: Patrik Kmec, Simeon Vass

15 February 2026 20	Komárno	2–2	DAC Dunajská Streda	Zlaté Moravce
15:30 CET (UTC+1)	Ganbayar (yellow card) 29'; Kacharaba 56' (o.g.); Žák 69' (pen.); Jones (yellow card) 90+3'	Report	Tuboly (yellow card) 8', (goal) 32'; Đukanović 14'; Kacharaba (yellow card) 55'; Nemanič (yellow card) 71'; Udvaros (yellow card) 90+1'	Stadium: ViOn Aréna; Attendance: 640; Referee: Matej Choreň; Assistant referees: Andrej Hrmo, Rastislav Kuba

21 February 2026 21	Tatran Prešov	1–1	Komárno	Prešov
15:30 CET (UTC+1)	Regáli 73'	Report	Ganbayar 11', (yellow card) 53'; Špiriak (yellow card) 68' (yellow-red card) 87'	Stadium: Futbal Tatran Arena; Attendance: 3,669; Referee: Peter Kráľovič; Assistant referees: Milan Štrbo, Matej Hrebeňár

28 February 2026 22	Komárno	1–1	Ružomberok	Zlaté Moravce
15:30 CET (UTC+1)	Jones (yellow card) 70'; Rudzan (yellow card) 82'; Mashike 88'	Report	Selecký 50', (yellow card) 68'	Stadium: ViOn Aréna; Attendance: 283; Referee: Filip Glova; Assistant referees: Adam Jekkel, František Ferenc

==== Relegation group ====
===== League table =====
Pos	Team	Pld	W	D	L	GF	GA	GD	Pts	Qualification or relegation	KOŠ	TRE	SKA	RUŽ	KOM	TAT
7	Košice	32	13	4	15	51	55	−4	43		—	2–0	2–0	3–1	2–1	2–1
8	Trenčín	32	13	3	16	34	51	−17	42		3–0	—	2–1	3–1	1–2	1–0
9	Skalica	32	9	8	15	34	45	−11	35		3–1	4–1	—	1–0	2–1	1–0
10	Ružomberok	32	8	11	13	34	50	−16	35		1–1	4–3	0–0	—	2–1	1–1
11	Komárno (O)	32	8	8	16	34	46	−12	32	Qualification for the relegation play-offs	1–2	0–1	0–2	3–0	—	1–0
12	Tatran Prešov (R)	32	6	12	14	29	43	−14	30	Relegation to the 2. Liga	2–1	0–1	3–0	0–0	0–0	—

Source: Niké liga (in Slovak)
Rules for classification: 1) Points; 2) Points in regular season; 3) Head-to-head points in regular season; 4) Head-to-head goal difference in regular season; 5) Head-to-head goals scored in regular season; 6) Head-to-head away goals scored in regular season (if two teams tied); 7) Goal difference; 8) Goals scored; 9) Fair play ranking; 10) Drawing of lots.
(O) Play-off winners; (R) Relegated

===== Results summary =====
Overall								Home						Away					
Pld	W	D	L	GF	GA	GD	Pts	W	D	L	GF	GA	GD	W	D	L	GF	GA	GD
10	3	1	6	10	12	−2	10	2	0	3	5	5	0	1	1	3	5	7	−2

Source: Worldfootball

===== Results by round =====
Round	23	24	25	26	27	28	29	30	31	32
Ground	H	A	A	H	H	A	H	A	A	H
Result	W	D	L	L	L	L	L	W	L	W
Position	8	9	9	10	10	10	11	11	12	11
Points	25	26	26	26	26	26	26	29	29	32

Source: Worldfootball
A = Away; H = Home; W = Win; D = Draw; L = Loss

===== Matches =====
8 March 2026 23	Komárno	3–0	Ružomberok	Zlaté Moravce
15:30 CET (UTC+1)	Druga 3'; Mustafić (yellow card) 64'; Jones 76', (yellow card) 81'; Mashike 90+3'	Report	Múdry (yellow card) 90+1'	Stadium: ViOn Aréna; Attendance: 293; Referee: Martin Dohál; Assistant referees: Tobiáš Pacák, Patrik Kmec

14 March 2026 24	Tatran Prešov	0–0	Komárno	Prešov
15:30 CET (UTC+1)	Sagna (yellow card) 81'; Begala (yellow card) 90'	Report	Mustafić (yellow card) 41'; Kiss (yellow card) 62'; Ganbayar (yellow card) 74'; Rudzan (yellow card) 78'	Stadium: Futbal Tatran Arena; Attendance: 3,299; Referee: Marián Ruc; Assistant referees: Rastislav Kuba, Simeon Vass

22 March 2026 25	Skalica	2–1	Komárno	Skalica
15:30 CET (UTC+1)	Potočný 31', (yellow card) 52'; Leginus 62'	Report	Kiss 85'; Bayemi (yellow card) 90'	Stadium: Mestský štadión Skalica; Attendance: 457; Referee: Michal Smolák; Assistant referees: Tomáš Straka, Martin Vitko

5 April 2026 26	Komárno	0–1	Trenčín	Zlaté Moravce
15:30 CEST (UTC+2)	Špiriak (yellow card) 78'	Report	Mathurin (yellow card) 35'; Soares (yellow card) 43'; Mikulaj 47'; Križan (yellow card) 90'; Diouf (yellow card) 90+2'	Stadium: ViOn Aréna; Attendance: 356; Referee: Michal Očenáš; Assistant referees: Adam Jekkel, Tobiáš Pacák

12 April 2026 27	Komárno	1–2	Košice	Zlaté Moravce
15:30 CEST (UTC+2)	Žák 45'	Report	Miljanić 6'; Perišić 9'; Julardžija (yellow card) 13'; Magda (yellow card) 15'; Čerepkai (yellow card) 74'	Stadium: ViOn Aréna; Attendance: 340; Referee: Boris Marhefka; Assistant referees: Pavel Jánošík, Rastislav Kuba

18 April 2026 28	Ružomberok	2–1	Komárno	Ružomberok
15:30 CEST (UTC+2)	Chrien 47'; Kelemen 83' (pen.), (yellow card) 83' (yellow-red card) 88'; Hladík (yellow card) 90'	Report	Žák 22', (yellow card) 58'; Ožvolda (yellow card) 36'; Krčík (yellow card) 90'	Stadium: Štadión pod Čebraťom; Attendance: 858; Referee: Filip Glova; Assistant referees: Patrik Kmec, Simeon Vass

25 April 2026 29	Komárno	0–2	Skalica	Zlaté Moravce
18:00 CEST (UTC+2)	Šmehyl (yellow card) 18'; Szűcs (yellow card) 52'; Šimko (yellow card) 64'; Ožvolda (yellow card) 72'; Žák (yellow card) 75'	Report	Pudhorocký 30' (pen.), (yellow card) 88'; Morong (yellow card) 50'; Abdullahi (yellow card) 70'; Ujlaky (yellow card) 75'; Bariš (yellow card) 77'; Onyedika 90+4'	Stadium: ViOn Aréna; Attendance: 342; Referee: Ivan Kružliak; Assistant referees: Branislav Hancko, Tomáš Straka

3 May 2026 30	Trenčín	1–2	Komárno	Trenčín
17:00 CEST (UTC+2)	Doesburg 90'	Report	Šimko (yellow card) 2'; Kiss 60'; Ganbayar 90+2'; Mustafić (yellow card) 90+3'; Dlubáč (yellow card) 90+4'	Stadium: Štadión Sihoť; Attendance: 909; Referee: Marián Ruc; Assistant referees: Ákos Juhos, Tomáš Vorel

10 May 2026 31	Košice	2–1	Komárno	Košice
17:00 CEST (UTC+2)	Madleňák 2'; Kovács 35'; Kóša (yellow card) 79'; Lukačević (yellow card) 83'	Report	Palán (yellow card) 38'; Ganbayar 70'; Žák (yellow card) 81'	Stadium: Košická futbalová aréna Attendance: 4,188; Referee: Michal Očenáš; Assistant referees: Tomáš Vorel, Pavel Jánošík

16 May 2026 32	Komárno	1–0	Tatran Prešov	Zlaté Moravce
17:00 CEST (UTC+2)	Mustafić (yellow card) 26', (yellow card) 34'; Tamás (yellow card) 66'; Dlubáč (yellow card) 80'; Druga (yellow card) 85'; Rudzan (yellow card) 90'	Report	Taraduda (yellow card) 45'; Souček (yellow card) 85'	Stadium: ViOn Aréna; Attendance: 1,950; Referee: Ivan Kružliak; Assistant referees: Ján Pozor, Dušan Štofik

==== Relegation play-offs ====
19 May 2026 First leg	Zvolen	1–0	Komárno	Zvolen
16:30 CEST (UTC+2)	Sylvestr 27', (yellow card) 29'; Filipiak (yellow card) 69'	Report	Tamás (yellow card) 9'	Stadium: Futbal Aréna Zvolen; Attendance: 1,856; Referee: Filip Glova; Assistant referees: Tobiáš Pacák, Peter Bednár

23 May 2026 Second leg	Komárno	3–0 (3–1 agg.)	Zvolen	Zlaté Moravce
20:30 CEST (UTC+2)	Rudzan (yellow card) 10', (goal) 43', 49'; Krčík (yellow card) 65'; Ganbayar 71'; Tamás (yellow card) 81'	Report	Petrák (yellow card) 23'; Adayilo (yellow card) 41'; Filipiak (yellow card) 62'; Gaško (yellow card) 90+5'	Stadium: ViOn Aréna; Attendance: 1,344; Referee: Peter Ziemba; Assistant referees: Tomáš Vorel, Peter Bednár
Note: Komárno won 3–1 on aggregate.

=== Slovak Cup ===
27 August 2025 Second round	Svodín	1–4	Komárno	Svodín
17:00 CEST (UTC+2)	Smiknya 31', (yellow card) 68'	Report	Bayemi 23'; Mashike 43'; Palán 60', 75'	Stadium: Športový areál ŠK Svodín; Attendance: 520; Referee: Matej Choreň; Assistant referees: Dušan Štofik, Alexandra Vargová

8 October 2025 Third round	Častkovce	0–4	Komárno	Častkovce
15:00 CEST (UTC+2)	Nahlik (yellow card) 25'; Minaroviech (yellow card) 27'; Lapoš (yellow card) 41'	Report	Špiriak (yellow card) 30'; Gamboš (yellow card) 42'; Žák 42', 68'; Rudzan (yellow card) 53'; Bayemi (yellow card) 62'; Mashike 90'	Stadium: Futbalový štadión Častkovce; Attendance: 357; Referee: Bálint Kišš; Assistant referees: František Ferenc, Michal Haring

22 October 2025 Fourth round	Slovan Galanta	2–3	Komárno	Galanta
14:30 CEST (UTC+2)	Kováč 51'; Horák (yellow card) 57'; Mečiar 60'; Mihálik (yellow card) 75'; Yusuf (yellow card) 90'	Report	Bayemi 5'; Mišovič 40'; Pastorek (yellow card) 55'; Mashike 90'	Attendance: 211; Referee: Michal Smolák; Assistant referees: Ákos Juhos, Matej Zemko

18 February 2026 Round of 16	Tatran Liptovský Mikuláš	1–0	Komárno	Liptovský Mikuláš
15:30 CET (UTC+1)	Bartoš 31'	Report	Pastorek (yellow card) 27'	Stadium: Štadión Okoličné; Attendance: 284; Referee: Erik Gemzický; Assistant referees: Tomáš Vorel, Andrej Hrmo; Fourth official: Tomáš Kolofík
