= 2009 Slovak Cup final =

- Event: 2008–09 Slovak Cup
MFK Košice	Artmedia Petržalka
3	1
- Date: 20 May 2009
- Venue: NTC Senec, Senec
- Referee: Pavel Olšiak
- Attendance: 1,528

The 2009 Slovak Cup final was the final match of the 2009–10 Slovak Cup, the 40th season of the top cup competition in Slovak football. The match was played at the NTC Senec in Senec on 20 May 2009 between MFK Košice and FC Artmedia Petržalka. MFK Košice defeated Artmedia 3-1.

== Route to the final ==
MFK Košice		Round	FC Artmedia Petržalka
Opponent	Result	2008–09 Slovak Cup	Opponent	Result
FK Čadca	4–2	Second Round	Bye
MFK Topvar Topoľčany	3–2	Third Round	FK LAFC Lučenec	2–0
FC ViOn Zlaté Moravce	1–1 away (5–3 pen.), 1–1 home	Quarter-finals	FK DAC 1904 Dunajská Streda	1–1 away, 0–0 home
ŠK Slovan Bratislava	1–0 away, 1–1 home	Semi-finals	MFK Ružomberok	3–1 away, 1–1 home

== Match ==
=== Details ===
20 May 2009
17:15 CEST

MFK Košice	3–1 (a.e.t.)	Artmedia Petržalka
Milinković 28'; Cicman 56'; Novák 69'	Report	Horváth 47'

NTC Senec, Senec
Attendance: 1,528
Referee: Pavel Olšiak

MFK Košice	Artmedia Petržalka

MFK KOŠICE:
GK	21	(Slovakia) Matúš Putnocký
RB	2	(Slovakia) Stanislav Kišš
CB	23	(Slovakia) Peter Bašista (c)
CB	13	(Slovakia) Róbert Cicman
LB	11	(Slovakia) Martin Juhar
DM	8	(Slovakia) Timon Dobias
CM	7	(Slovakia) Kamil Kuzma
CM	5	(Serbia) Nemanja Matić
RM	14	(Slovakia) Miroslav Viazanko
LM	19	(Serbia) Marko Milinković	(substituted off) 84'
FW	18	(Slovakia) Ján Novák
Substitutions:
RM	17	(Slovakia) Lukáš Janič	(substituted on) 84'
Manager:
Ján Kozák

ARTMEDIA PETRŽALKA:
GK	18	(Slovakia) Ľuboš Kamenár
RB	10	(Slovakia) Martin Mikulič	(substituted off) 75'
CB	19	(Slovakia) Peter Struhár
CB	24	(Slovakia) Peter Burák	(substituted off) 69'
LB	23	(Slovakia) Roman Konečný
DM	17	(Slovakia) Kornel Saláta
CM	6	(Slovakia) Tomáš Kóňa
CM	8	(Slovakia) Vojtech Horváth
AM	16	(Slovakia) Juraj Czinege (c)
LM	7	(Slovakia) Patrik Mráz
FW	9	(Slovakia) Tomáš Majtán
Substitutions:
DM	5	(Togo) Karim Guédé	(substituted on) 69'
FW	14	(Brazil) Caihame	(substituted on) 75'
Manager:
Michal Hipp

Assistant referees:
(Slovakia) D. Kubačka
(Slovakia) D. Hrčka
