= Christian Bayemi =

Cameroonian footballer (born 1998)

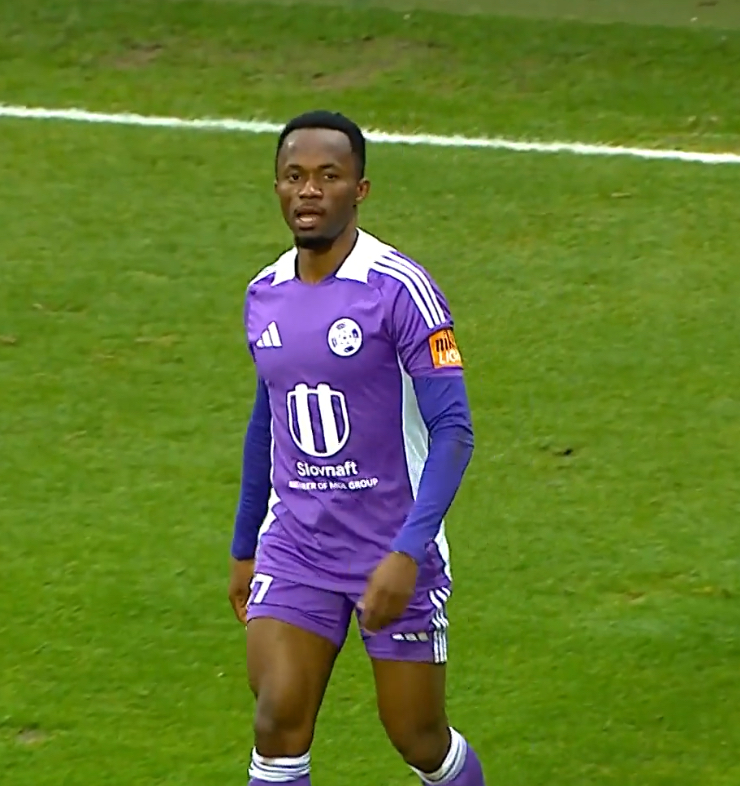
- Bayemi playing for KFC Komarno in 2025

Personal information
- Full name: Christian Emmanuel Nguidjol Bayemi
- Date of birth: 25 December 1998 (age 27)
- Height: 1.72 m (5 ft 8 in)
- Position: Winger

Team information
- Current team: KFC Komarno
- Number: 17

Youth career
- Eding Sport FC

Senior career*
Years	Team	Apps	(Gls)
?–2019	Eding Sport FC		
2019–	KFC Komarno	162	(29)

International career^{‡}
2015	Cameroon U17	2	(2)
- * Club domestic league appearances and goals as of 22 September 2026 ‡ National team caps and goals as of 10 December 2025

Christian Emmanuel Nguidjol Bayemi (born 25 December 1998) is a Cameroonian professional footballer who plays as a winger for Slovak First League club KFC Komárno.

Bayemi is also a former Cameroon youth international, being a part of the Cameroon U-17 squad for the 2015 African U-17 Championship. In 2024, Bayemi won the 2. Liga with Komárno.

Altogether, Bayemi has played over 165 games for Komárno in all competitions, scoring 39 times and assisting 25 goals.

== Club career ==
=== Eding Sport ===
Bayemi is a product of the Eding Sport academy, and was considered a talented winger. On 9 March 2018, he was voted as the best player of the month, scoring five goals in five games at the age of only 19.

=== KFC Komarno ===
On 19 July 2019, he signed a contract with the then Slovak 2. Liga side KFC Komárno. On 20 July 2019, Bayemi made his debut for Komárno in a 1–0 win over Podbrezová. On 3 September 2024, he scored the winning goal in a 4–3 win against MŠK Žilina B. In the same season, Komárno would celebrate winning the 2. Liga after catching up to title favorites Tatran Presov, who went on a bad run of results near the end of the season.

==== 2024–25 season ====
Bayemi scored his first top flight division goal against Spartak Trnava to increase the score to 2–1 in Komarno’s favour, however they ended up losing the game 3–2. He scored a penalty in a 1–0 win over Ružomberok, securing a win and avoiding relegation. In his first top flight season with the club, Bayemi scored 3 goals and provided 3 assists in 29 games.

==== 2025–26 season ====
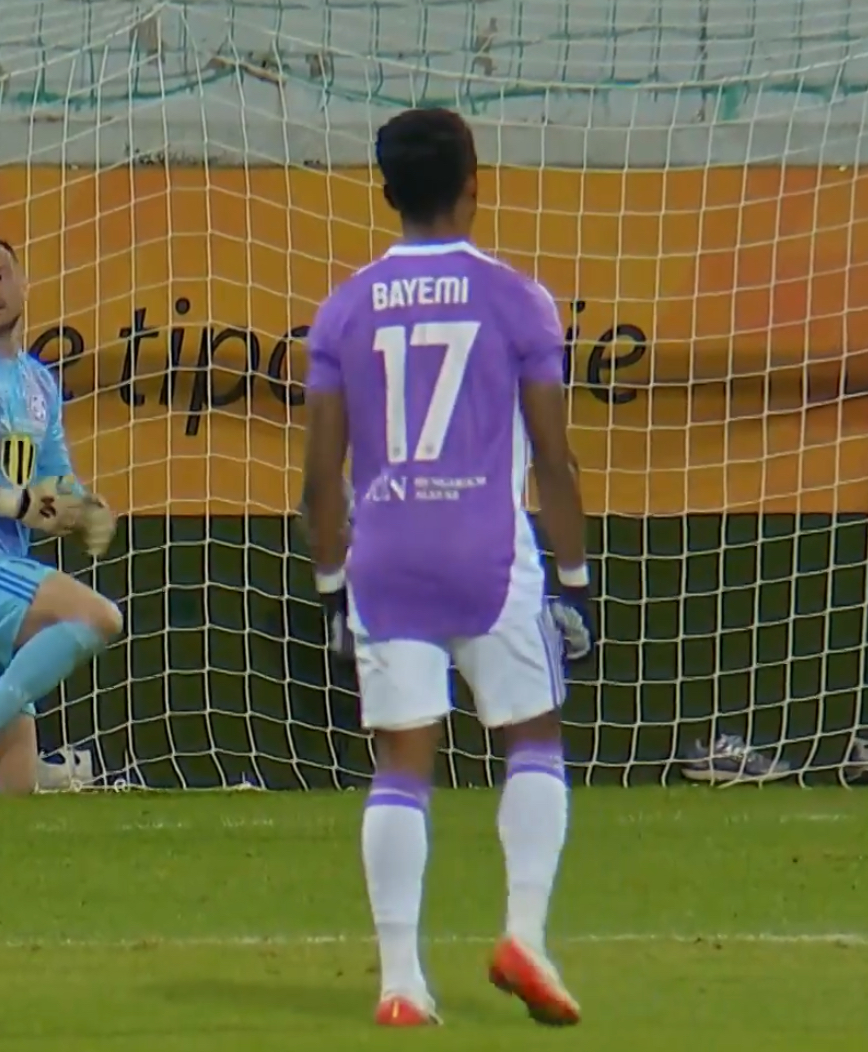
Bayemi playing against FC Košice

His first goal contribution in the 2025–26 season came in the form of an assist. Elvis Mashike came onto the pitch after a change of sides and 12 minutes later he headed in a cross from his teammate Bayemi to secure a 1–0 home win in the league against MFK Skalica. Bayemi scored his first goal of the season in a 1–1 draw against Zemplín Michalovce. He converted a penalty to equalize the game in the 91st minute. On 21 February 2026, he assisted a goal to Ganbayar Ganbold in a 1–1 draw against Tatran Presov.

== International career ==
In an African U-17 Championship qualification, Bayemi scored a goal against Ghana U17 to make the score 4–3 in favor of Ghana. Ghana won the round 6–4 on aggregate however they were disqualified on 26 October 2014, after medical test provided by the African Confederation after their first leg play off victory against Cameroon found that one of their players failed age eligibility confirmations. Ghana appealed but failed.

Bayemi was a part of the Cameroon U-17 squad for the 2015 African U-17 Championship. He played in a 3–1 loss to South Africa U17, where he also scored the only goal for Cameroon.

He has stated that his dream is to play for the Cameroon national team.

== Career statistics ==
As of 29 March 2026

Appearances and goals by club, season and competition
Club	Season	League			Cup	
Club	Season	Division	Apps	Goals	Apps	Goals
KFC Komárno	2019–20	2. Liga	7	3	1	0
KFC Komárno	2020–21	2. Liga	16	4	3	3
KFC Komárno	2021–22	2. Liga	21	5	2	0
KFC Komárno	2022–23	2. Liga	28	5	5	3
KFC Komárno	2023–24	2. Liga	30	7	2	1
KFC Komárno	2024–25	Slovak First League	29	3	3	0
KFC Komárno	2025–26	Slovak First League	20	1	4	3
Total			151	28	20	10

== Honors ==
KFC Komarno

- 2. Liga (Slovakia): 2023–24
