= 2008–09 Slovak Cup =

Tournament details
- Country: Slovakia
- Teams: 48

Final positions
- Champions: Košice
- Runners-up: Artmedia Petržalka

The 2008–09 Slovak Cup was the 40th season of Slovakia's annual knock-out cup competition and the sixteenth since the independence of Slovakia. It began on 5 August 2008 the matches of first round and ended on 20 May 2009 with the final. The winners of the competition earned a place in the third qualifying round of the UEFA Europa League. Artmedia Petržalka were the defending champions.

== First round ==
The games were played around 5 August 2008.

Team 1	Score	Team 2
FK Spartak Vráble	3–1	AS Trenčín
OŠK Trenčianske Stankovce	2–0	SFM Senec
FC Dúbravka Bratislava	0–1	Inter Bratislava
MŠK Iskra Petržalka	1–2	AFC Nové Mesto nad Váhom
MFK Vrbové	0–1	HFK Prievidza
FK Púchov	3–0	OTJ Moravany nad Váhom
FK Rača Bratislava	1–1 (a.e.t.), (2–4 p)	MFK Topvar Topoľčany
ŠK Reca	1–0	FK Slovan Nemšová
ŠK Blava Jaslovské Bohunice	2–3	FK Slovan Duslo Šaľa
Turčianske Teplice	1–7	MFK Vranov nad Topľou
TJ Topoľany	0–1	FK Čadca
ŠK Kremnička	2–2 (a.e.t.), (3–5 p)	LAFC Lučenec
MFK Goral Stará Ľubovňa	0–0 (a.e.t.), (3–4 p)	FK Žiar nad Hronom
FC Rimavská Sobota	1–3	ŠK Odeva Lipany
FK Poprad	2–2 (a.e.t.), (1–3 p)	TJ Jednota Bánová
FK Spišská Nová Ves	0–1	ŽP Šport Podbrezová
Tatran NAO Liptovský Mikuláš	3–0	Slavoj Trebišov
MFK Dolný Kubín	0–0 (a.e.t.), (6–5 p)	1. HFC Humenné
MFK Zemplín Michalovce	w/o	no opponent

== Second round ==
The games were played around 16 September 2008.

Team 1	Score	Team 2
ŠK Reca	0–3	FC ViOn Zlaté Moravce
AFC Nové Mesto nad Váhom	0–2	Spartak Trnava
FK Žiar nad Hronom	0–2	MFK Dubnica
DAC Dunajská Streda	4–2	Inter Bratislava
OŠK Trenčianske Stankovce	0–4	Slovan Bratislava
MFK Topvar Topoľčany	2–0	FC Nitra
FK Slovan Duslo Šaľa	1–0	FK Spartak Vráble
FK Púchov	2–1	HFK Prievidza
FK Čadca	2–4	MFK Košice
MFK Zemplín Michalovce	3–1	Tatran Prešov
MFK Dolný Kubín	1–0	Dukla Banská Bystrica
TJ Jednota Bánová	0–2	MŠK Žilina
Tatran NAO Liptovský Mikuláš	0–1	MFK Ružomberok
LAFC Lučenec	1–1 (a.e.t.), (5–4 p)	ŽP Šport Podbrezová
ŠK Odeva Lipany	2–1	MFK Vranov nad Topľou

== Third round ==
The games were played on 24 September 2008 (1 game), 30 September 2008 (4 games), 1 October 2008 (2 games) & 21 October 2008 (1 game).

Team 1	Score	Team 2
Artmedia Petržalka	2–0	LAFC Lučenec
ŠK Odeva Lipany	0–1	DAC Dunajská Streda
FK Slovan Duslo Šaľa	1–4	MFK Ružomberok
MFK Dolný Kubín	0–2	Slovan Bratislava
MFK Topvar Topoľčany	2–3	MFK Košice
FK Púchov	0–0 (a.e.t.), (3–4 p)	FC ViOn Zlaté Moravce
MŠK Žilina	1–0	Spartak Trnava
MFK Dubnica	2–0	MFK Zemplín Michalovce

== Quarter-finals ==
The first legs were played on 21 and 22 October 2008 with the exception of Žilina – Slovan, which was played on 4 March 2009. The second legs were played on 4 November 2008 with the exception of Slovan – Žilina, which was played on 18 March 2009.

=== First legs ===
21 October 2008	MFK Košice	1–1	Zlaté Moravce	Košice
15:30	Škutka 17'	Report	Ujlaky 77'	Stadium: Štadión Lokomotívy; Attendance: 630; Referee: Pavol Olšiak

21 October 2008	MFK Dubnica	0–1	MFK Ružomberok	Dubnica nad Váhom
17:30		Report	Kucka 14'	Stadium: Štadión Zimný; Attendance: 565; Referee: Pavol Chmura

22 October 2008	Artmedia Petržalka	0–0	DAC Dunajská Streda	Bratislava
14:00		Report		Stadium: Štadión Petržalka; Attendance: 500; Referee: Richard Havrilla

4 March 2009	MŠK Žilina	1–2	Slovan Bratislava	Žilina
17:30	Vladavić 46'	Report	Dobrotka 7'; Slovák 72'	Stadium: Štadión pod Dubňom; Attendance: 4,177; Referee: Vladimir Vnuk

=== Second legs ===
4 November 2008	DAC Dunajská Streda	1–1 (1–1a agg.)	Artmedia Petržalka	Dunajská Streda
13:30	Rabihou 27'	Report	Piroska 23'	Stadium: Mestský štadión Attendance: 3,100; Referee: Július Straka

4 November 2008	MFK Ružomberok	2–0 (3–0 agg.)	MFK Dubnica	Ružomberok
16:00	Mašek 53'; Zošák 64'	Report		Stadium: Štadión pod Čebraťom; Attendance: 1,969; Referee: Vladimir Vnuk

4 November 2008	Zlaté Moravce	1–1 (2–2 agg.) (3–5 p)	MFK Košice	Zlaté Moravce
16:00	Klabal 90+'	Report 1 Report 2	Novák 64'	Stadium: Štadión FC ViOn; Attendance: 1,240; Referee: Roman Matúš
	Penalties
	Minarčík (penalty scored); Klabal (penalty missed); Náther (penalty scored); Bajza (penalty scored)		(penalty scored) Školník; (penalty scored) Kolbas; (penalty scored) Bašista; (penalty scored) Novák; (penalty scored) Cicman

18 March 2009	Slovan Bratislava	0–0 (2–1 agg.)	MŠK Žilina	Bratislava
17:00		Report		Stadium: Tehelné pole Attendance: 3,159; Referee: Mário Vlk

== Semi-finals ==
The first legs were played on 22 April 2009. The second legs were played on 5 May 2009.

=== First legs ===
22 April 2009	MFK Ružomberok	1–3	Artmedia Petržalka	Ružomberok
16:00	Lačný 21'	Report	Majtán 41'; Czinege 70' (pen.); Caihame 90'	Stadium: Štadión pod Čebraťom; Attendance: 2,345; Referee: Vladimir Vnuk

22 April 2009	Slovan Bratislava	0–1	MFK Košice	Bratislava
19:00		Report	Milinković 29'	Stadium: Tehelné pole Attendance: 3,165; Referee: Pavol Šipoš

=== Second legs ===
5 May 2009	Artmedia Petržalka	1–1 (4–2 agg.)	MFK Ružomberok	Bratislava
16:00	Sylvestr 50'	Report	Lačný 74'	Stadium: Štadión Petržalka; Attendance: 400; Referee: Pavol Chmura

5 May 2009	MFK Košice	1–1 (2–1 agg.)	Slovan Bratislava	Košice
17:15	Novák 71'	Report	Obžera 41'	Stadium: Štadión Lokomotívy; Attendance: 2,200; Referee: Mário Vlk

== Final ==
20 May 2009
17:15 CEST

MFK Košice	3–1 (a.e.t.)	Artmedia Petržalka
Milinković 28'; Cicman 56'; Novák 69'	Report	Horváth 47'

NTC Senec, Senec
Attendance: 1,528
Referee: Pavel Olšiak
