= Ganbold Ganbayar =

Mongolian footballer

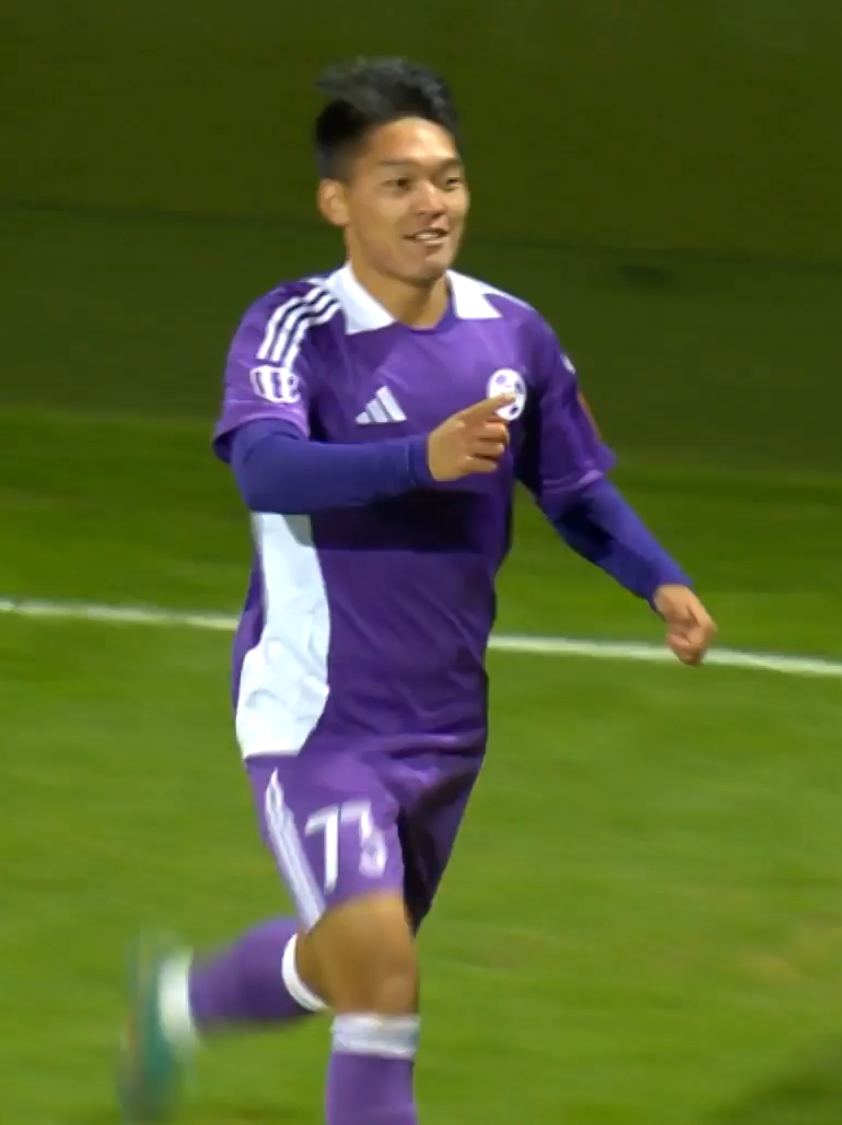
- Ganbayar celebrating a goal against Spartak Trnava

Personal information
- Full name: Ganbold Ganbayar; Ганболдын Ганбаяр
- Date of birth: 9 March 2000 (age 26)
- Place of birth: Sükhbaatar, Mongolia
- Height: 1.79 m (5 ft 10 in)
- Positions: Attacking midfielder; forward

Team information
- Current team: Komárno
- Number: 7

Youth career
- 2014: Khoromkhon
- 2016–2018: Puskás Akadémia

Senior career*
Years	Team	Apps	(Gls)
2015–2016	Khoromkhon	23	(26)
2018–2024	Puskás Akadémia	3	(0)
2018	→ Ulaanbaatar City (loan)	2	(1)
2020	→ Csákvár (loan)	26	(3)
2021–2024	→ Komárno (loan)	75	(13)
2024–	Komárno	70	(8)

International career^{‡}
2013	Mongolia U14	4	(5)
2015	Mongolia U17	2	(0)
2017	Mongolia U20	3	(1)
2017–2023	Mongolia U23	6	(0)
2021–	Mongolia	18	(2)
- * Club domestic league appearances and goals as of 22 September 2026 ‡ National team caps and goals as of 22 September 2026

Ganbold Ganbayar (Mongolian: Ганболдын Ганбаяр; born 9 March 2000) is a Mongolian professional footballer who plays for Slovak First Football League club Komárno. He became the first Mongolian ever to sign a professional contract with a top-flight club in Europe when he signed for Puskás Akadémia in August 2018. Ganbayar has been touted as Mongolia's potential first superstar player.

== Club career ==
=== Mongolia ===
Ganbayar started playing football at age 7. He first joined the youth team of Khoromkhon FC of the Mongolian Premier League in 2014. That year, the senior team won the league championship in the playoffs after being tied on points with Erchim FC (but with an inferior goal differential) following the regular season. During the 2015 Mongolian Premier League season, he scored 15 goals in 11 matches. That year, he was a 70th-minute substitute in the first match of the season for his first senior appearance. He scored his first senior goal against Ulaanbaatar FC in the team's second match and became a regular starter afterward. Ganbayar also competed in the Mongolian Football Federation Under-17 youth division in 2015 and was named the best forward in his division of the tournament.

In May 2014, Ganbayar was named the best player in the under-15 category of Sensation-2020, an annual national high school football tournament under the auspices of the president of Mongolia. In this eighth edition of the tournament, he became the first player from a rural area to win the award.

Ganbayar appeared in both of Khoromkhon's matches during 2016 AFC Cup qualification. He started both matches and played all but three minutes as the team was defeated 0–1 by K-Electric F.C. of Pakistan and played to a scoreless draw against Druk United of Bhutan. Ganbayar was the youngest player to compete at the tournament.

In 2016, he scored 11 goals in 12 league appearances as Khoromkhon finished third in the league. He once again also competed in the Youth Division in 2016 and was named the top forward in the Under-17 age division.

==== Early experience abroad ====
In 2011, Ganbayar participated in junior camps held by Italian Serie A club AC Milan in the Mongolian capital of Ulaanbaatar. He was one of four players out of over 200 who were invited to participate in the final youth tournament in Milan.

Because of his performances with the Mongolia Under-14 team in 2013, he attracted interest from Académica de Coimbra of the Portuguese Primeira Liga. However, he preferred to stay in Mongolia and play in the domestic league in hopes of gaining the attention of other European clubs.

In March 2016 Ganbayar, along with fellow Mongolian Soyol-Erdene Gal-Erdene and Mongolia national team coach Zorigtyn Battulga, traveled to England to train with Barnet FC of League Two for a month at The Hive Stadium. He tallied two goals and two assists over two matches for the Under-16 side, including an assist against Norwegian club Stabæk after entering as a late substitute and two goals and an assist against Fulham.

=== Hungary ===
In September 2016, it was announced that Ganbayar had accepted a year-long residency with the youth academy of Puskás Akadémia of Hungary's Nemzeti Bajnokság II. The club competed in the Nemzeti Bajnokság I, the top division of Hungarian football, before being relegated following the 2015–16 season. He and three fellow Mongolians were chosen for the residency as part of a partnership between the Mongolian Football Federation and the Hungarian Football Federation initiated in 2014. Ganbayar and his three compatriots became the first players from Asia to ever play at the academy. For his first year at with the club, he was only eligible to compete in friendly matches. On 21 January 2017 he was in the starting lineup as the under-17 team played a friendly match against the under-17 side of Croatian Prva HNL club NK Osijek. The match ended in a 3–2 victory for Puskás. He also featured in friendlies against the academies of FK Senica of Slovakia and Czech clubs SK Slavia Prague and FK Dukla Prague. He scored a goal for his club on 14 February 2017 in a 3–1 victory over Székelyföld Labdarúgó Akadémia.

In May 2017 it was announced that three of the four Mongolians who spent the year at the academy were going home to Mongolia. Ganbayar was the only player to remain and was at that time announced as part of the under-17 squad for the upcoming 2017 Puskás Cup. He appeared as a second-half substitute in the tournament's opening match, a 1–0 victory over German giants FC Bayern Munich. The side's only goal was scored seven minutes after Ganbayar took the field. Ganbayar made his next appearance in the tournament as a second-half substitute against Budapest Honvéd in the bronze medal match. Puskás earned the eventual victory 7–6 on penalties, with Ganbayar converting the team's second penalty kick. By winning the bronze, he became the first Mongolian to win a medal in a European competition.

In the offseason following the Puskás Cup in June 2017, Ganbayar returned to Mongolia. He would return to Hungary in August 2017. Because he was not previously signed to a contract, he could not compete in league matches for the club. However, he signed a contract before returning to Mongolia, making him eligible to compete in the under-19 league the following season. He was to be paid €600.

==== Loan return to Mongolia ====
On 11 April 2018 it was announced that Ganbayar had returned to Mongolia on loan to play for Ulaanbaatar City FC on a one-year, ₮6,000,000 per month contract until October 2018. On 23 April 2018, in his first competitive match with the club, Ulaanbaatar City FC won the 2018 Mongolia Super Cup 4–2 over Erchim FC. He made his league debut for the club on 28 April 2018 in a 1–1 draw with Arvis FC on matchday 1. Ganbayar scored his lone goal of the brief stint on 10 June 2018 against Selenge Press FC.

==== Return to Hungary ====
Ganbayar returned to Hungary in early August 2018 after making two league appearances and scoring one goal for Ulaanbaatar City FC. Only a few days later he participated in the 2018 Honved Cup with Puskás Akadémia FC's under-19 side. He came on as a first-half substitute in the team's opening match against Brøndby IF of Denmark. The match ended in a 0–1 defeat. The next day he was named a starter and played the full match against FK Partizan of Serbia. Puskás was defeated again, this time 0–4. After placing third in Group A, Puskás Akadémia FC faced Molde FK of Norway in the consolation match. Ganbayar again played the full match as the Hungarian side earned a 3–0 victory and fifth place in the tournament.

On 24 August 2018 it was announced that Ganbayar had officially signed a youth contract with the club, becoming the first Mongolian player to sign for a fully professional club in Europe. Six days after his 18th birthday, he made his league debut for the under-19 team. After coming on as a second-half substitute against Debreceni VSC's under-19 side, Ganbayar scored his first league goal for the club six minutes later in the eventual 1–3 defeat. Ganbayar scored his first brace in the team’s next match, a 5–1 victory over Ferencvárosi TC. Overall, he also scored seven goals in 26 matches for the reserve team in the NB III over two seasons.

=== Aqvital FC Csákvár ===
In July 2020, it was announced that Ganbayar had joined Aqvital FC Csákvár of the Nemzeti Bajnokság II, Hungary's second tier league, on loan. On the 8th of that month he appeared in a 6–0 pre-season friendly victory over FC Tatabánya. He scored the team's fourth goal for his first tally for the club. He then appeared in a 2–1 friendly victory against Békéscsaba 1912 Előre eighteen days later. Ganbayar made his league debut for the club on 2 August 2020, coming on as a second-half substitute in the team's opening match of the 2020–21 NB II season. The away match ended in a 0–3 defeat to Gyirmót FC Győr. Ganbayar scored his first league goal for the club on 23 August 2020 in an eventual 2–2 draw with Kaposvári Rákóczi FC.

In late August 2020, Ganbayar was loaned back to Puskás Akadémia FC and named to the senior squad to face Sweden's Hammarby IF in the teams' opening match of 2020–21 UEFA Europa League qualification. However, ultimately he did not make the trip to Sweden with the team.

=== KFC Komárno ===
In July 2021 Ganbayar was loaned to KFC Komárno of the Slovak 2. Liga for the 2021–22 season. He scored his first goal for the club on 17 July 2021 in a friendly against MŠK Hurbanovo. Ganbayar remained on loan to the club until August 2024 at which time it was announced that the move had been made permanent. The previous season, he helped the club earn promotion to the Slovak First Football League, the highest level of football in Slovakia. Ganbayar made his top flight debut for Komárno in a 4:1 loss against league champions Slovan Bratislava, providing an assist for Jakub Sylvestr.

== International career ==
In 2013, Ganbayar competed in the qualifying stages of the 2014 AFC U-14 Championship. For this inaugural edition of the tournament, Mongolia competed in Group G against Hong Kong, DPR Korea, Macau, and Japan. Matches were played at the Mong Kok Stadium in Hong Kong. The Mongolian U14 team won their first match 7–0 against Macau before losing 0–4 to Japan, 0–8 to North Korea, and 0–5 to Hong Kong. In Mongolia's victory over Macau, Ganbayar scored five of his team's seven goals. This was the first time in Mongolian international football history that a player scored five goals in a single match.

In September 2015 Ganbayar was part of Mongolia's squad that competed in qualification for the 2016 AFC U-16 Championship. He played all 180 minutes and served as the team's captain for both matches, a 0–17 defeat to Japan and a 2–5 defeat to Hong Kong.

In June 2017 head coach Michael Weiß named Ganbayar to Mongolia's roster for 2018 AFC U-23 Championship qualification which was scheduled to take place the following month. Mongolia was part of Group H along with Thailand, Indonesia, and Malaysia. Ganbayar was 16 years old at the time. In preparation for the tournament, the under-23 team competed against a team consisting of the Mongolian Premier League's best players. The under-23 team won 3–0 with Ganbayar scoring twice in the match. His second goal came from an impressive individual effort. Following the match, the team departed for a 12-day training camp at the Mokpo International Football Center in South Korea in partnership with the KFA. They were scheduled to compete in friendlies against the South Korea under-19 team and a league team. Mongolia was defeated by the Korean under-19 side 0–4. Ganbayar then appeared in the team's next match, a 1–2 defeat to Jeju United who finished the 2016 season in third place in the K League Classic. He started and played the full match of Mongolia's opening fixture of qualification, a 1–1 draw with Thailand. In the match, he occasionally troubled the defense. He then started the team's next match, a 0–7 defeat to Indonesia, before being subbed off in the second half. Ganbayar came in as a 55th-minute substitute in Mongolia's final match of the tournament, a 0–2 defeat to Malaysia. With only a mathematical chance of progressing going into the match, the defeat eliminated Mongolia from advancing to the final tournament.

Ganbayar was named to Mongolia's under-19 squad for 2018 AFC U-19 Championship qualification by Erchim FC and under-19 national team coach Zorigtyn Battulga in October 2017, with Mongolia hosting its qualification group early the following month. Battulga previously accompanied the player on his month-long training stint in England with Barnet FC in 2016. Mongolia was drawn into Group I along with Japan, Thailand, and Singapore. Ganbayar started and played the full match in the opening 0–7 defeat to Japan and 2–5 defeat to Thailand. He entered the final match against Singapore as a 39th-minute substitute, scoring the team's fourth goal of the 4–2 victory in the 92nd minute. The victory guaranteed Mongolia third place in the group but was not enough to advance from the group stage.

Ganbayar received his first senior international call ups for two matches against Brunei in June 2019 for First Round qualification matches for the 2022 FIFA World Cup. He sustained a hamstring injury while training in Phuket, Thailand but was expected to heal in time for the opening match. He participated in training matches against Thai clubs Phuket City F.C. and Krabi FC as part of the 10-day camp. He was an unused substitute in both matches against Brunei as Mongolia advanced to the second round 3–2 on aggregate. He made his debut on 25 March 2021 in a World Cup qualifier against Tajikistan.

Ganbayar went on score his first two senior international goals in 2–0 2023 AFC Asian Cup qualification victor over Yemen on 14 June 2022.

== Personal life ==
Ganbayar is from Sükhbaatar in the Selenge Province.

== Honours ==
Khoromkhon

- Mongolian Premier League: 2014

Puskás Akadémia

- Nemzeti Bajnokság I Runner-up: 2020-21
- Puskás Cup Third place: 2017

Ulaanbaatar City

- Mongolia Super Cup: 2018

KFC Komárno

- Slovak Second Football League: 2023-24

Individual

- Mongolian Male Footballer of the Year: 2022

== Career statistics ==
=== Club ===
As of 24 August 2024

Club	Season	League			Cup		Continental		Total	
Club	Season	Division	Apps	Goals	Apps	Goals	Apps	Goals	Apps	Goals
Puskás Akadémia II	2018–19	Nemzeti Bajnokság III	27	8	0	0	0	0	27	8
Puskás Akadémia II	2019–20	Nemzeti Bajnokság III	14	4	0	0	0	0	14	4
Puskás Akadémia II	2020–21	Nemzeti Bajnokság III	5	3	0	0	0	0	5	3
Puskás Akadémia II	Total		46	15	0	0	0	0	46	15
Ulaanbaatar City (loan)	2018	Mongolian Premier League	2	1	0	0	0	0	2	1
Ulaanbaatar City (loan)	Total		2	1	0	0	0	0	2	1
Csákvár (loan)	2020–21	Nemzeti Bajnokság II	26	3	0	0	0	0	26	3
Csákvár (loan)	Total		26	3	0	0	0	0	26	3
Puskás Akadémia	2020–21	Nemzeti Bajnokság	3	0	0	0	0	0	3	0
Puskás Akadémia	Total		3	0	0	0	0	0	3	0
Komárno (loan)	2021–22	2. Liga	26	5	2	0	0	0	28	5
Komárno (loan)	2022–23	2. Liga	28	4	5	1	0	0	30	5
Komárno (loan)	2023–24	2. Liga	21	4	0	0	0	0	21	4
Komárno (loan)	Total		75	13	7	1	0	0	82	14
Komárno	2024–25	1. Liga	30	4	4	1	0	0	34	5
Komárno	2025–26	1. Liga	28	4	3	0	0	0	31	4
Komárno	2026–27	1. Liga	5	0	0	0	0	0	5	0
Komárno	Total		63	8	7	1	0	0	70	9
Career total			212	40	14	2	0	0	226	42

=== International ===
As of match played 14 June 2022.

Mongolia national team
Year	Apps	Goals
2021	3	0
2022	3	2
Total	6	2

==== International appearances ====
As of match played 11 June 2024.

International appearances
#	Date	Venue	Opponent	Result^{†}	Competition
2021
1	25 March	Pamir Stadium, Dushanbe, Tajikistan	Tajikistan	0–3	2022 FIFA World Cup qualification
2	30 March	Fukuda Denshi Arena, Chiba, Japan	Japan	0–14	2022 FIFA World Cup qualification
3	7 June	Yanmar Stadium Nagai, Osaka, Japan	Kyrgyzstan	1–0	2022 FIFA World Cup qualification
2022
4	8 June	MFF Football Centre, Ulaanbaatar, Mongolia	Palestine	0–1	2023 AFC Asian Cup qualification
5	11 June	MFF Football Centre, Ulaanbaatar, Mongolia	Philippines	0–1	2023 AFC Asian Cup qualification
6	14 June	MFF Football Centre, Ulaanbaatar, Mongolia	Yemen	2–0	2023 AFC Asian Cup qualification
2023
7	25 March	Adjarabet Arena, Batumi, Georgia	Georgia	1–6	Friendly
8	9 June	Kalinga Stadium, Bhubaneswar, India	India	0–2	2023 Intercontinental Cup
9	12 June	Kalinga Stadium, Bhubaneswar, India	Lebanon	0–0	2023 Intercontinental Cup
10	15 June	Kalinga Stadium, Bhubaneswar, India	Vanuatu	0–1	2023 Intercontinental Cup
11	12 October	Pamir Stadium, Dushanbe, Tajikistan	Afghanistan	0–1	2026 FIFA World Cup qualification
12	17 October	MFF Football Centre, Ulaanbaatar, Mongolia	Afghanistan	0–1	2026 FIFA World Cup qualification
2024
13	7 June	Phnom Penh Olympic Stadium, Phnom Penh, Cambodia	Cambodia	0–2	Friendly
14	11 June	MFF Football Centre, Ulaanbaatar, Mongolia	Cambodia	2–1	Friendly
^{†}Mongolia's goal tally first

==== International goals ====
Scores and results list Mongolia's goal tally first.

No.	Date	Venue	Opponent	Score	Result	Competition
1	14 June 2022	MFF Football Centre, Ulaanbaatar, Mongolia	Yemen	1–0	2–0	2023 AFC Asian Cup qualification
2	14 June 2022	MFF Football Centre, Ulaanbaatar, Mongolia	Yemen	2–0	2–0	2023 AFC Asian Cup qualification
Last updated 14 June 2022
