= Martin Boďa =

Slovak footballer (born 1997)

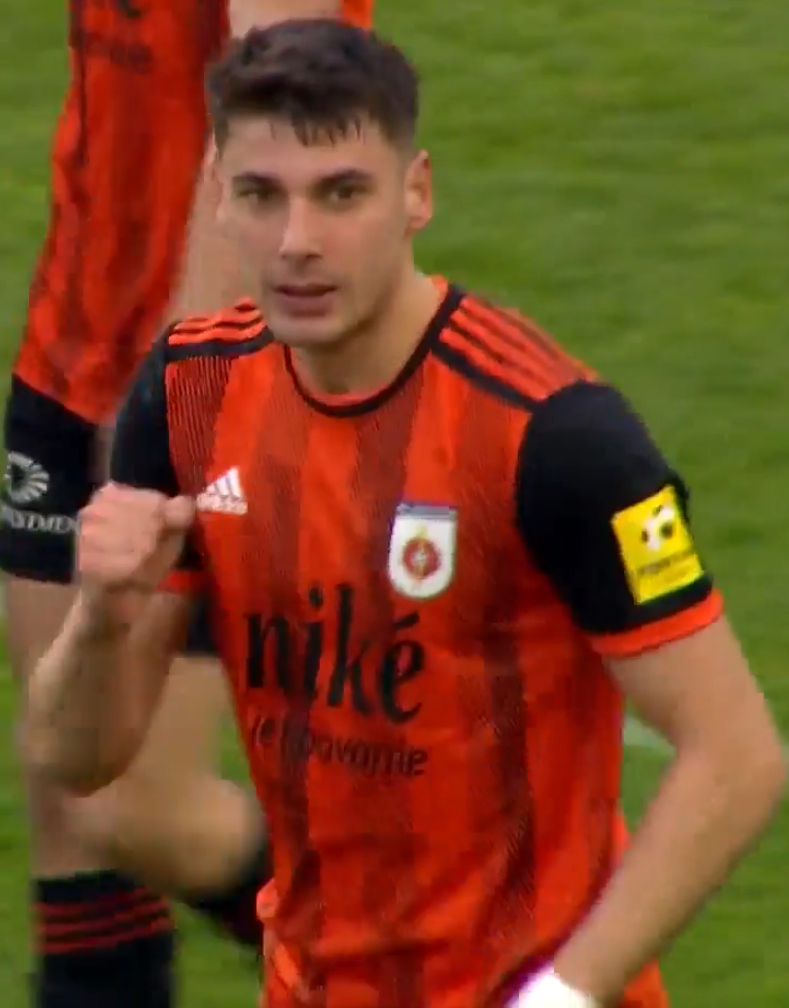
- Boďa playing with Ružomberok in 2023

Personal information
- Full name: Martin Boďa
- Date of birth: 2 February 1997 (age 29)
- Place of birth: Slovakia
- Height: 1.93 m (6 ft 4 in)
- Position: Forward

Team information
- Current team: MFK Ružomberok
- Number: 30

Youth career
- Belá-Dulice

Senior career*
Years	Team	Apps	(Gls)
2016–2020	Fomat Martin	15	(12)
2020–	MFK Ružomberok	103	(18)
2025–2026	→ KFC Komarno (loan)	25	(1)
- * Club domestic league appearances and goals as of 22 September 2026

Martin Boďa (born 2 February 1997) is a Slovak professional footballer who currently plays for Slovak First League club MFK Ružomberok. He plays as a centre-forward.

Boďa joined MFK Ružomberok in 2020, from MŠK Fomat Martin. He made his first-team debut for Ruža in August 2020, and has one Slovak Cup. He signed for Komárno in July 2025 on a loan.

== Club career ==
=== MFK Ružomberok ===
Boďa was transferred to MFK Ružomberok in the summer of 2020 after impressing with his performances, scoring twelve goals in fifteen matches in the 3rd league. He made his debut for the club in a 0–0 draw against ŠKF Sereď, coming on as a substitute in the 70th minute for Adam Brenkus. Boďa scored his first goal for Ružomberok in a 3–2 loss against MŠK Žilina, converting a penalty in the 90th minute after being on the pitch for 10 minutes.

In 2022, he signed a 3 year extension to his contract with Ružomberok.

In the 2023-24 season, Boďa won the Slovak Cup with Ružomberok, scoring 1 goal in 5 games during his teams campaign. In the following season also scored a goal in the UEFA Conference League, when he converted a penalty kick in a rematch against FC Noah.

=== KFC Komarno (loan) ===
On 23 June 2025, it was announced that Boďa would be joining KFC Komárno on a 1 year loan. He made his debut for the club in a 2–1 loss against AS Trenčín, starting the game but was subbed off in the 64th minute. Boďa scored his first goal for Komárno in a 4–1 loss against Spartak Trnava, scoring in the 50th minute.

== Career statistics ==
As of 10 December 2025

Club	Season	League		Cup		Europe	
Club	Season	Apps	Goals	Apps	Goals	Apps	Goals
MFK Ružomberok	2020/2021	17	1	3	1	—	
MFK Ružomberok	2021/2022	23	7	3	0	—	
MFK Ružomberok	2022/2023	10	2	0	0	0	0
MFK Ružomberok	2023/2024	28	5	5	1	—	
MFK Ružomberok	2024/2025	20	2	8	4	6	1
KFC Komárno (loan)	2025/2026	11	1	0	0	—	
Total		110	18	19	6	6	1

== Honours ==
MFK Ružomberok

- 2023-24 Slovak Cup winners
- 2024-25 Slovak Cup runners up
