= Zyen Jones =

American soccer player (born 2000)

Personal information
- Full name: Zyen Jones
- Date of birth: August 25, 2000 (age 26)
- Place of birth: Clarkston, Georgia, United States
- Height: 1.81 m (5 ft 11 in)
- Position: Winger

Team information
- Current team: El Paso Locomotive

Youth career
- 2013–2015: Alpharetta Ambush
- 2015–2016: Georgia United
- 2016–2018: Atlanta United
- 2018–2019: Schalke 04

Senior career*
Years	Team	Apps	(Gls)
2019–2020	Charlotte Independence	12	(0)
2020–2023	Ferencváros II	24	(7)
2021	→ Spartak Trnava (loan)	7	(0)
2022	→ Tromsø (loan)	0	(0)
2023	Nõmme Kalju	14	(3)
2024–2025	FC Košice	49	(6)
2026	KFC Komárno	8	(1)
2026–	El Paso Locomotive	0	(0)

International career^{‡}
	United States U17	14	(5)
2018	United States U19	1	(0)
2018	United States U20	1	(0)
- * Club domestic league appearances and goals as of July 22, 2026 ‡ National team caps and goals as of April 23, 2019

Zyen Jones (born August 25, 2000) is an American soccer player who plays as a winger for El Paso Locomotive FC in the USL Championship.

== Career ==
=== Club ===
After spending time in the Atlanta United FC academy, Jones moved to German side Schalke 04 in 2018. After playing with their under-19 team, Jones returned to the United States and joined USL Championship side Charlotte Independence on April 19, 2019. He was released by Charlotte on January 20, 2020.

After several months without a club, he joined Hungarian side Ferencváros in October 2020, playing for their reserve team.

On July 22, 2026 El Paso Locomotive announced they had signed Jones for the USL Championship season.

=== International ===
Jones has been capped at the U-17 and U-20 levels for the USA youth national team. He is also eligible to play for Jamaica via his Jamaican father.
