= Jozef Pastorek =

Slovak footballer

Personal information
- Full name: Jozef Pastorek
- Date of birth: 26 September 1998 (age 28)
- Place of birth: Nové Zámky, Slovakia
- Position: Midfielder

Team information
- Current team: Komárno
- Number: 7

Youth career
- –2015: FŠ FKM Nové Zámky
- 2010: → Nové Zámky (loan)
- 2011–2012: → Nitra (loan)
- 2013–2014: → Nové Zámky (loan)
- 2016–2017: Aston Villa

Senior career*
| Years | Team | Apps | (Gls) |
| 2017–2018 | Aston Villa U23 | 6 | (0) |
| 2019–2021 | Železiarne Podbrezová | 18 | (1) |
| 2020–2021 | → Komárno (loan) | 21 | (5) |
| 2021– | Komárno | 60 | (6) |

International career^{‡}
| 2014 | Slovakia U17 | 3 | (0) |
| 2018 | Slovakia U20 | 1 | (0) |
- * Club domestic league appearances and goals as of 22 June 2024 ‡ National team caps and goals as of 29 October 2019

Jozef Pastorek (born 26 September 1998) is a Slovak footballer who plays for Komárno as a midfielder.

== Club career ==
=== FK Železiarne Podbrezová ===
Pastorek made his professional debut for FK Železiarne Podbrezová against Nitra on 16 February 2019.
