= Ján Kozák (footballer, born 1954) =

Slovak footballer and manager

Personal information
- Full name: Ján Kozák
- Date of birth: 17 April 1954 (age 72)
- Place of birth: Matejovce nad Hornádom, Czechoslovakia
- Height: 1.83 m (6 ft 0 in)
- Position: Midfielder

Youth career
- Spišská Nová Ves

Senior career*
Years	Team	Apps	(Gls)
- Spišská Nová Ves
1975–1980	Lokomotíva Košice	149	(34)
1980–1982	Dukla Prague	48	(13)
1982–1986	Lokomotíva Košice	57	(10)
1986–1987	Seraing	10	(1)
1987–1988	Bourges	33	(8)
1988–1990	Lokomotíva Košice		

International career
1976–1984	Czechoslovakia	55	(9)
1976	Czechoslovakia B	1	(0)

Managerial career
- 1993–1995: Lokomotíva Košice
- 1995–1997: 1. FC Košice
- 1998: 1. FC Košice
- 2002–2003: Michalovce
- 2004–2005: Ličartovce
- 2005–2009: MFK Košice
- 2012–2013: MFK Košice
- 2013–2018: Slovakia
- * Club domestic league appearances and goals

Ján Kozák (born 17 April 1954) is a Slovak football manager and former player. Between 2013 and 2018, he managed Slovak national team. As the manager of Slovakia, his team qualified for the 2016 UEFA Euro, thus marking Slovakia's first time to appear in the tournament.

In 1981, Kozák became Footballer of the Year in Czechoslovakia. He played 254 matches in the Czechoslovak First League and scored 57 goals. Internationally he scored 9 goals in 55 appearances for Czechoslovakia, taking part in UEFA Euro 1980 and being in the squad for the 1982 FIFA World Cup.

== Personal ==
Kozák's son, Ján Kozák, is also former national player of Slovakia and most recently head coach of FC VSS Košice; his grandson, Filip Lesniak, is also footballer and plays for Georgian club FC Telavi.

== Honours ==
=== Player ===
Dukla Prague

- Czechoslovak First League: Winners: 1981–82
- Czechoslovak Cup: Winners: 1981

Lokomotíva Košice

- Czechoslovak Cup: Winners (2x): 1977, 1979

Czechoslovakia

- UEFA Euro 1980: 3rd place

Individual

- Czechoslovak Footballer of the Year: 1981

=== Manager ===
1.FC Košice

- Slovak First Football League: Winners (2x) 1996–97 1997–98

MFK Košice

- 2. Liga (Slovakia): Winners: 2005–06 (Promoted)
- Slovak Cup: Winners: 2009

Individual

- Slovak Manager of the Year: Winner (5): 2013, 2014, 2015, 2016, 2017
