= Boris Druga =

Slovak footballer (born 2002)

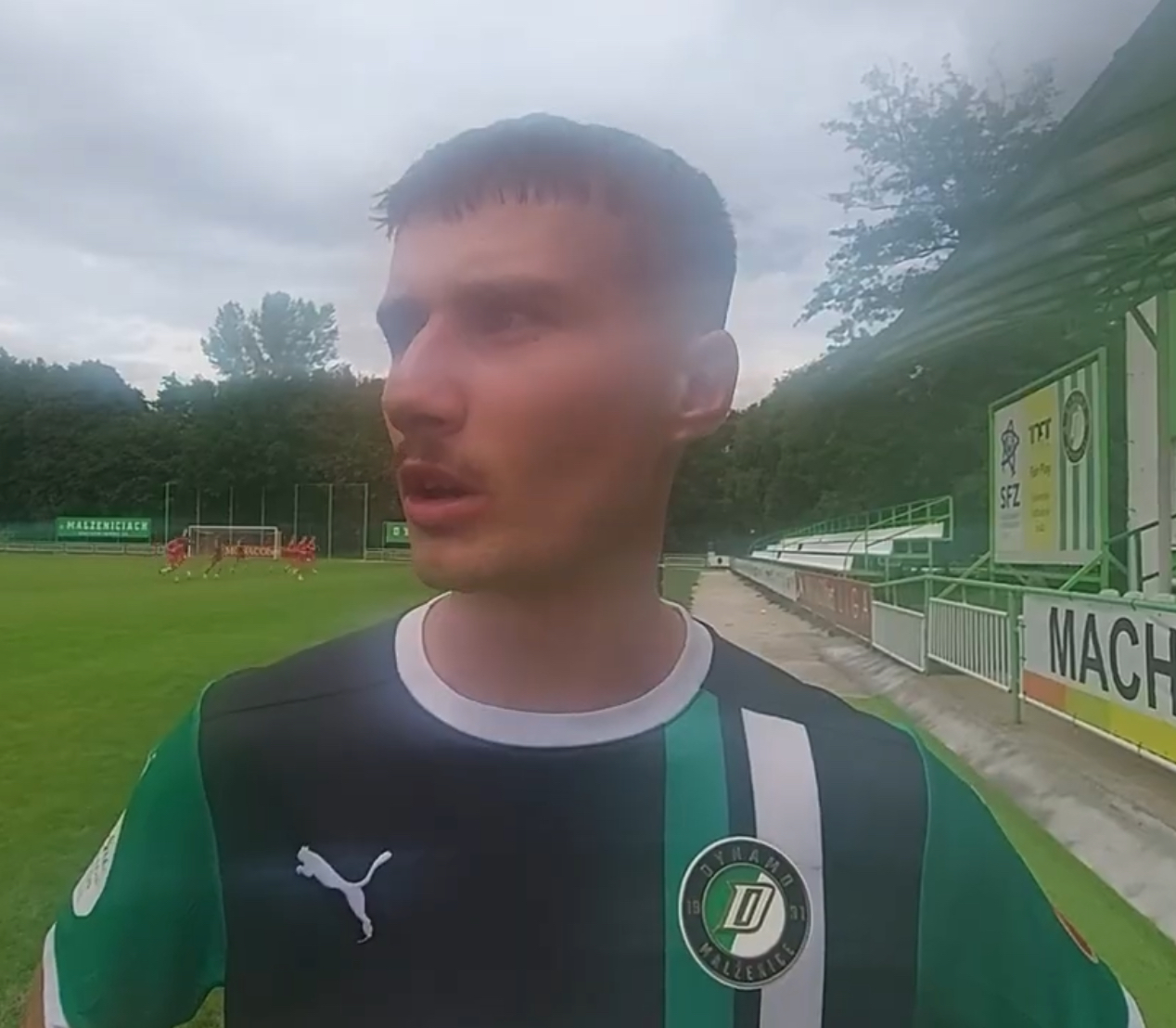
- Druga in 2025

Personal information
- Date of birth: 25 March 2002 (age 24)
- Place of birth: Nové Zámky, Slovakia
- Height: 1.82 m (6 ft 0 in)
- Position: Winger

Team information
- Current team: KFC Komárno (on loan from OFK Dynamo Malženice)
- Number: 97

Youth career
- –2019: FC Nitra
- 2019–2020: FKM Nové Zámky (loan)
- 2020–2021: KFC Komárno

Senior career*
Years	Team	Apps	(Gls)
2021–2024	KFC Komárno	46	(4)
2023–2024	Slavoj Trebišov (loan)	28	(6)
2024–	OFK Dynamo Malženice	40	(15)
2025–	KFC Komárno (loan)	7	(1)
- * Club domestic league appearances and goals as of 17 May 2026

Boris Druga (born 25 March 2002) is a Slovak football player who currently plays for Slovak First Football League side KFC Komárno, on loan from 2. Liga club OFK Dynamo Malženice. He predominantly plays as a winger, but can also be deployed through the middle.

== Club career ==
Druga joined the FC Nitra youth academy at the age of 11. After being loaned out to FKM Nové Zámky, he joined the academy of KFC Komárno.

=== KFC Komárno ===
In his debut matches for KFC Komárno, twenty-year-old striker Boris Druga was successful in scoring, when he scored the only goal for his team in a 1–1 draw against FC Slovan Galanta and scored twice in a 7–1 victory over Kalna nad Hronom. Druga made his league debut for Komárno in a game against Dukla Banská Bystrica coming onto the pitch as a substitute in the 89th minute. Druga scored his first professional goal in a game against FC Košice, scoring in the last 10 minutes to secure the win for his team.

==== Loan to Slavoj Trebišov ====
In 2023, Druga joined FK Slavoj Trebišov. He scored two goals, including the winning one in a 3–2 win over Spartak Myjava. He went on to have his best season up to that point, scoring six goals in twenty-eight matches.

=== Dynamo Malženice ===
In 2024, Druga joined 2. Liga club OFK Dynamo Malženice. In his first season he scored 7 goals in 24 appearances. On 3 August 2025, Druga scored two goals in a 3–1 win over MŠK Púchov, securing the win for his team. In the 2025–26 Slovak Cup, Druga scored in a 3–1 loss against first division side AS Trenčín in the fourth round.

==== Return to Komárno (loan) ====
On 21 January 2026, it was announced that Druga would be returning to KFC Komárno, this time in the first division, on a half-year loan.
