= Mestský štadión Komárno =

Football venue in Slovakia

Coordinates: 47.7582°N 18.1366°E

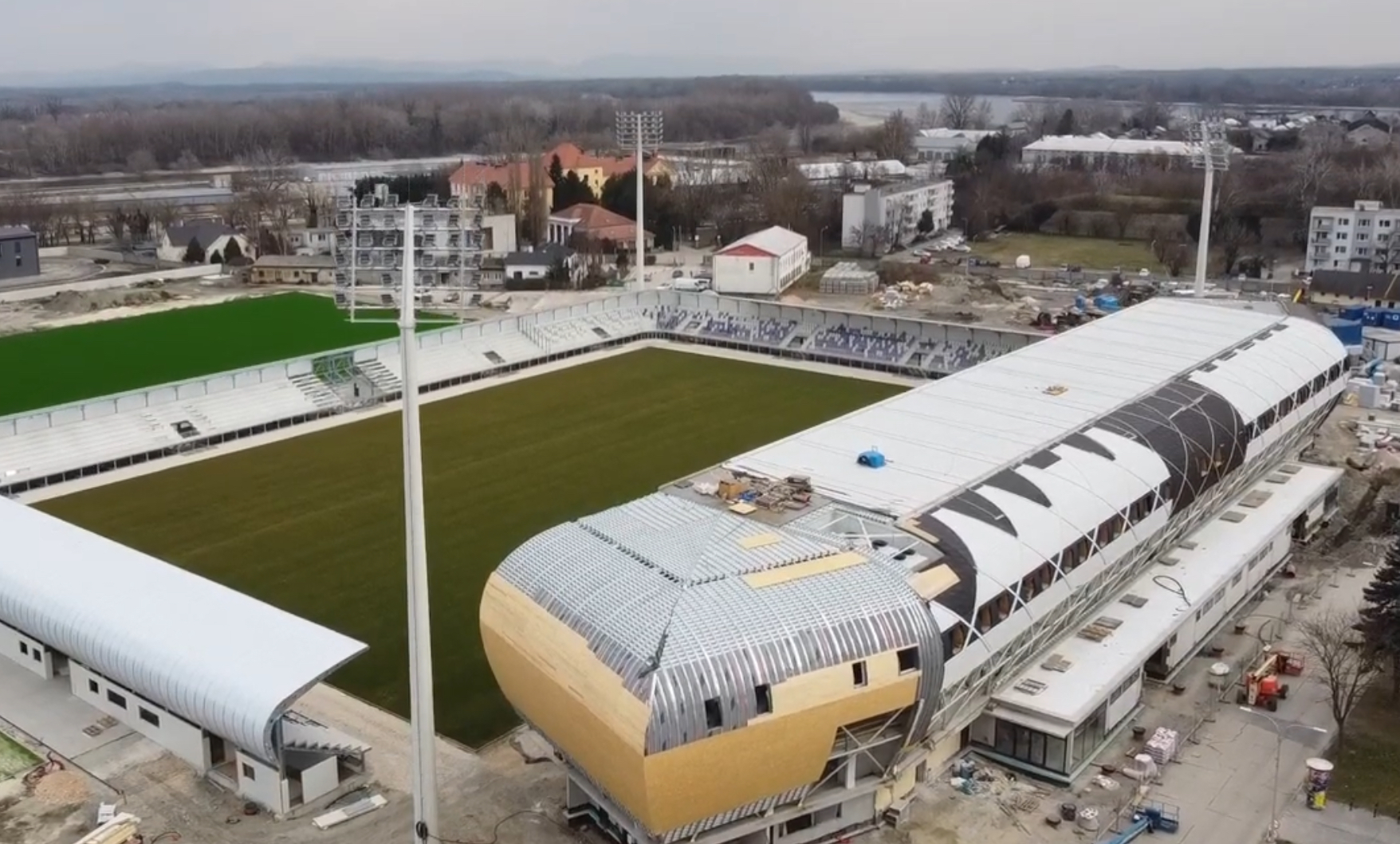
- Aerial view of the stadium during its construction in 2025
- Address: Komárno; Slovakia
- Capacity: 5,500

Mestský štadión Komárno is a football stadium located in Komárno, Slovakia. It will be the home stadium of Slovak First Football League side, KFC Komárno. The stadium has a capacity of 5,500.

== History ==
=== Construction ===
Once Komárno was promoted to the second league, they received a subsidy for the construction of a new stadium worth 5.9 million euros. In December 2019, the Hungarian government of Komárno approved another large sum of money for the stadium worth 6.8 million euros.

Construction work for a new stadium began in May 2023 and, according to the original plans, the stadium was to be completed fifteen months later. However, the reconstruction dragged on, costs rose, and the date when Komárno could finally play at home kept moving. Six amendments were gradually added to the original contract with the contractor. According to them, the price of the reconstruction increased to 21.1 million euros. There were periods when the money ran out and the work was expensive. In the summer of 2025, 85% of the stadium was already finished, and at that time the club's president Juraj Baráth promised that Komárno would be able to play at home in the spring, but in the end nothing came of it. The stadium was completed in May 2026.

== See also ==
- List of football stadiums in Slovakia
