= Dan Ožvolda =

Czech footballer

Personal information
- Full name: Dan Ožvolda
- Date of birth: 11 October 1996 (age 30)
- Place of birth: Czech Republic
- Position: Midfielder

Team information
- Current team: Komárno
- Number: 6

Youth career
- –2015: Baník Ostrava

Senior career*
| Years | Team | Apps | (Gls) |
| 2015–2019 | Baník Ostrava | 8 | (0) |
| 2017–2019 | → Vítkovice (loan) | 43 | (0) |
| 2019 | → Frýdek-Místek (loan) | 17 | (1) |
| 2020–2021 | Vítkovice | 14 | (1) |
| 2021 | Vratimov | 17 | (1) |
| 2022 | Pohronie | 24 | (1) |
| 2023– | Komárno | 94 | (8) |
- * Club domestic league appearances and goals as of 17 May 2026

Dan Ožvolda (born 11 October 1996) is a Czech professional footballer who plays as a midfielder for KFC Komárno.

== Club career ==
=== Baník Ostrava ===
Ožvolda started training with Baník Ostrava's A-team in September 2015, having previously been part of the club's youth teams. He made his professional debut for Baník Ostrava against Sparta Prague on 6 December 2015. He appeared in the starting line-up and was replaced by Jakub Šašinka after 77 minutes. Baník lost 0-1 following David Lafata's first-half goal. Ožvolda headed out on loan to nearby Czech clubs, firstly Vítkovice, followed by Frýdek-Místek, neither of which played in the Czech First League. He then joined Vítkovice permanently in 2020, where he was named captain.

=== Slovakia ===
==== FK Pohronie ====
Ožvolda moved to Slovakia, joining Fortuna Liga's Pohronie after last playing for Czech lower-league side Vratimov. He debuted in first possible league fixture on 12 February 2022 at na Sihoti against AS Trenčín. He completed the entirety of the 3–0 defeat, following a first half penalty goal by Jakub Kadák and two second-half strikes by Eduvie Ikoba.

Ožvolda scored his first goal for the Žiar nad Hronom-based club against reigning champions Slovan Bratislava on 19 February 2022 during a 3-4 home defeat. While Pohronie was up by three at half-time following Ožvolda's third-minute goal and two penalty strikes by former Slovak international Jaroslav Mihalík, Pohronie lost the game and Ožvolda was replaced by Ladji Mallé after 83 minutes.

==== Komárno ====
Ožvolda joined 2. Liga (Slovakia) side Komárno in 2023. He scored his first league goal for the club, the only goal of the game, in August 2023 against Malženice.
