= Mikuláš Radványi =

Slovak football manager

Personal information
- Date of birth: 22 November 1968 (age 57)
- Place of birth: Dunajská Streda, Czechoslovakia
- Height: 1.84 m (6 ft 0 in)
- Position: Forward

Youth career
- Slovan Galanta
- Dunajská Streda
- Gabčíkovo

Senior career*
| Years | Team | Apps | (Gls) |
| | Dunajská Streda | 3 | (2) |
| –1991 | Slovan Duslo Šaľa | | |
| 1991–1994 | Dunajská Streda | 81 | (29) |
| 1994–1995 | Saarbrücken | 21 | (3) |
| 1995–1996 | Spartak Trnava | | (9) |
| 1997 | Kaučuk Opava | 8 | (0) |
| 1997 | Spartak Trnava | | |
| 1997–2000 | Dunajská Streda | 84 | (29) |
| 2000–2001 | Neusiedl am See | | |
| 2001–2002 | Würmla | | |
| 2002–2003 | FC Andau | | |
| 2003–2006 | SV Donau Langenlebarn | | |

Managerial career
- 2003–2008: SV Donau Langenlebarn
- 2008–2010: Dunajská Streda (assistant coach)
- 2010–2011: Dunajská Streda
- 2011: SFM Senec
- 2012: Komárno
- 2012–2015: Dunajská Streda
- 2015: Russel Gabčíkovo
- 2016: Frýdek-Místek
- 2016: Spartak Myjava
- 2017: Mezőkövesd
- 2019–2020: Pohronie
- 2020–2021: Železiarne Podbrezová
- 2021–2026: KFC Komárno
- 2026-: Slovan Galanta
- * Club domestic league appearances and goals

Mikuláš Radványi (Hungarian: Radványi Miklós, born 22 November 1968) is a Slovak football manager and former player, currently manager of Slovan Galanta.

He has previously managed Frýdek-Místek, Spartak Myjava, Pohronie, Komárno, SFM Senec and Dunajská Streda.

== Club career ==
In 1993, Radványi played with DAC Dunajska Streda. He played in the 1992–93 Slovak Cup final, where DAC were defeated 5–4 on penalties against 1. FC Košice after a goalless draw in front of 6,500 spectators in the Na Zahradkach Stadium.

In 1995, Radványi joined Spartak Trnava, becoming the club’s most expensive transfer at the time.

Radványi joined Opava in 1997. He made eight league appearances for Opava in the Gambrinus liga.

== Managerial career ==
As a coach, Radványi first worked at SV Donau Langenleben. He then moved to Dunajská Streda. He first worked at the club as an assistant and then as a head coach. In May 2011, he took over as coach of ŠK SFM Senec. In 2012, he briefly managed KFC Komárno. In the summer of 2012, he returned to DAC Dunajská Streda. In the 2012/13 season, he helped the team get promoted back to the top flight. In January 2015, he was dismissed from the club and was replaced by Croatian coach Tomislav Marić. Before the 2016/17 season, Radványi took over the newly promoted side Spartak Myjava, replacing Norbert Hrnčár, who left for MFK Ružomberok. After Myjava withdrew from the first league during the winter break of the season, he looked for a new job. In May 2017, he became the new manager of Hungarian team Mezőkövesd-Zsóry SE.

=== KFC Komárno ===
In 2021, Radványi joined 2. Liga club KFC Komárno. In the 2023–24 season, he would guide the club to promotion to the first division for the first time in their history. He helped the club finish in 2nd place of the relegation group in their first season, achieving 39 points from 32 games. Radványi was sacked from the club on 27 April 2026, the following season, after a 2–0 loss against MFK Skalica, the fifth loss in a row.

== Honours ==
=== Manager ===
DAC Dunajská Streda

- DOXXbet liga: Winners: 2012–13 (Promoted)

KFC Komárno

- MONACObet liga: Winners: 2023–24 (Promoted)
