= Šimon Šmehyl =

Slovak footballer

Šimon Šmehýl
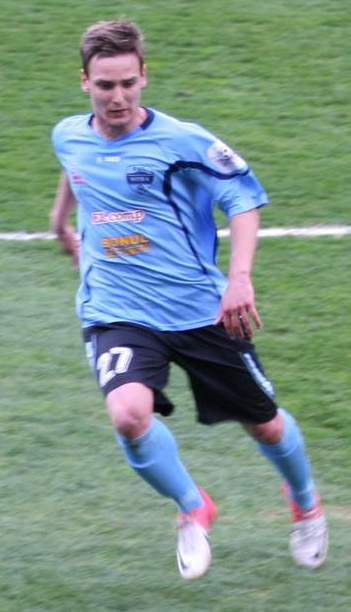

Personal information
- Date of birth: 9 February 1994 (age 32)
- Place of birth: Topoľčany, Slovakia
- Height: 1.75 m (5 ft 9 in)
- Position: Winger

Team information
- Current team: KFC Komárno
- Number: 8

Youth career
- 2000–2005: OFK Solčany
- 2005–2012: FC Nitra

Senior career*
Years	Team	Apps	(Gls)
2012–2016	FC Nitra	94	(8)
2016	Senica	12	(0)
2016–2017	Spartak Myjava	1	(0)
2017	Banská Bystrica	13	(0)
2017–2019	ŠTK Šamorín	45	(5)
2019	Znojmo	14	(2)
2019–2020	Baník Sokolov	25	(1)
2020–2021	Prostějov	20	(0)
2021–	Komárno	146	(20)

International career
- Slovakia U15
- Slovakia U17
- Slovakia U18
2012–2013	Slovakia U19	5	(2)
- * Club domestic league appearances and goals as of 22 September 2026

Šimon Šmehyl (born 9 February 1994) is a Slovak professional footballer who plays as a forward for KFC Komárno.

== FC Nitra ==
He made his professional debut for FC Nitra against FK Dukla Banská Bystrica on 10 November 2012.
