= Jakub Sylvestr =

Slovak footballer (born 1989)

Personal information
- Date of birth: 2 February 1989 (age 37)
- Place of birth: Banská Bystrica, Czechoslovakia
- Height: 1.78 m (5 ft 10 in)
- Position: Forward

Team information
- Current team: Komárno
- Number: 9

Youth career
- 1997–2004: Jupie Podlavice
- 2004–2005: Dukla Banská Bystrica
- 2005–2007: Slovan Bratislava

Senior career*
Years	Team	Apps	(Gls)
2007–2010	Slovan Bratislava	77	(13)
2009	→ Petržalka (loan)	14	(7)
2010–2012	Dinamo Zagreb	32	(2)
2012–2014	Erzgebirge Aue	66	(23)
2014–2017	1. FC Nürnberg	42	(10)
2016	→ SC Paderborn (loan)	4	(0)
2017–2018	Aalborg	22	(5)
2018–2019	Beitar Jerusalem	29	(7)
2019	Bnei Yehuda	13	(7)
2019–2020	Ashdod	8	(1)
2020	Hapoel Haifa	17	(5)
2020–2021	Chennaiyin	19	(2)
2021–2022	Žalgiris Vilnius	46	(8)
2023	Resovia	13	(1)
2023	Sektzia Ness Ziona	6	(1)
2024–2025	Komárno	39	(8)
2025–2026	MFK Zvolen	29	(22)
2026–	Komárno	4	(0)

International career
2006–2008	Slovakia U19	11	(2)
2008–2010	Slovakia U21	14	(7)
2010–2014	Slovakia	6	(0)
- * Club domestic league appearances and goals as of 19 August 2026 (UTC)

Jakub Sylvestr (born 2 February 1989) is a Slovak professional footballer who plays as a forward for Komárno.

== Club career ==
=== Early career ===
Sylvestr scored his first hat-trick in a match against Tatran Prešov on 4 April 2009.

=== Erzgebirge Aue ===
In 2012, Sylvestr joined 2. Bundesliga club Erzgebirge Aue, signing a four-year contract. He scored in a 3–0 win against FC St. Pauli. His second season with Erzgebirge Aue was his most successful, becoming the joint top goal scorer in the 2. Bundesliga. Several teams in the German top flight were interested in Slovak international in the summer transfer window. Sylvestr eventually decided to join rivals Nürnberg.

=== 1. FC Nürnberg ===
On 3 June 2014, Sylvestr joined 2. Bundesliga club 1. FC Nürnberg, signing a three-year contract. He scored in the home match of the opening round of the 2. Bundesliga against his former club Erzgebirge Aue. His strike from the 69th minute against Erzgebirge was ultimately the winner. Sylvestr was rumored to be leaving at the end of the season, but ultimately decided to stay at Nürnberg for one season.

=== Later career ===
On 19 February 2017, Sylvestr scored in his league debut for Danish Superliga club AaB. In his second match he scored a hat-trick, and was voted Player of the Month in the league. In December 2017, he left the club.

On 20 October 2020, Sylvestr joined Indian Super League club Chennaiyin FC on a one-year deal. He appeared with the club in 19 league matches and scored twice as Chennaiyin finished on eighth position.

On 9 January 2023, Sylvestr joined Polish second division side Resovia.

=== KFC Komárno ===
==== 2023–24 season: Promotion to the First Division ====
In February 2024, it was announced that after 14 years abroad, Sylvestr would be returning to Slovakia, this time to 2. Liga club KFC Komárno. He scored his first goal in a 2–0 win over MFK Tatran Liptovský Mikuláš in March 2024, scoring in the 10th minute of the game. The goal was Sylvestr’s first in a league match in Slovakia after more than thirteen years. At the end of the season, Komárno would overtake title favorites Tatran Presov and win the 2. Liga, getting promoted to the Slovak First Football League.

==== 2024–25 season ====
Sylvestr made his return in the first division in a 4–1 loss against his former club, Slovan Bratislava, scoring the only goal for his team to equalize the game to 1–1 in the 19th minute. His next goal came in a 3–2 loss to Spartak Trnava, scoring from a corner and subsequently injuring his nose in the process. Komárno would go on to score again and lead the match 2–1 until goals from Spartak in the 81st and 84th minute would seal the win. Sylvestr assisted the winning goal to Ondřej Rudzan in a 5–4 win against MFK Zemplín Michalovce. In his last season with the club he scored four times and assisted four times, helping Komárno avoid relegation with 39 points.

=== MFK Zvolen ===
In the summer of 2025, Sylvestr joined 2. Liga club MFK Zvolen. He impressed with his performance in his first four games, being able to score two hat-tricks in a 3–2 win over against FC Petržalka and a 5–1 over Baník Lehota. After the first half of the 2. Liga season, Sylvestr amassed 15 goals in 17 appearances. His great form from led to rumors about him returning to the First League, however Sylvestr denied these claims, saying that nobody had contacted him.

== International career ==
Sylvestr has played for Slovakia's youth national teams. He made his senior debut on 3 September 2010, in a Euro 2012 qualifier against North Macedonia. Sylvestr came on in stoppage time as a substitute for Peter Pekarík, helping Slovakia win the match 1–0 after a goal scored by Martin Škrtel. Sylvestr would have to wait until 14 November 2012, for his next appearance for the national team, when coach Michal Hipp named him in the starting lineup for a friendly against the Czech Republic. On 19 November 2013, Sylvestr was given a chance under coach Ján Kozák in a friendly match against Gibraltar, which took place in the Portuguese Algarve city of Faro and was Gibraltar's first ever official match after being admitted as the 54th member of UEFA in May 2013. The match resulted in a surprising 0–0 draw, with players from the wider national team and several debutants playing for the Slovak national team.

== Honours ==
KFC Komárno

- 2. Liga (Slovakia): 2023–24

Individual

- 2. Bundesliga top scorer: 2013–14
