= Martin Šimko =

Slovak footballer (born 1998)

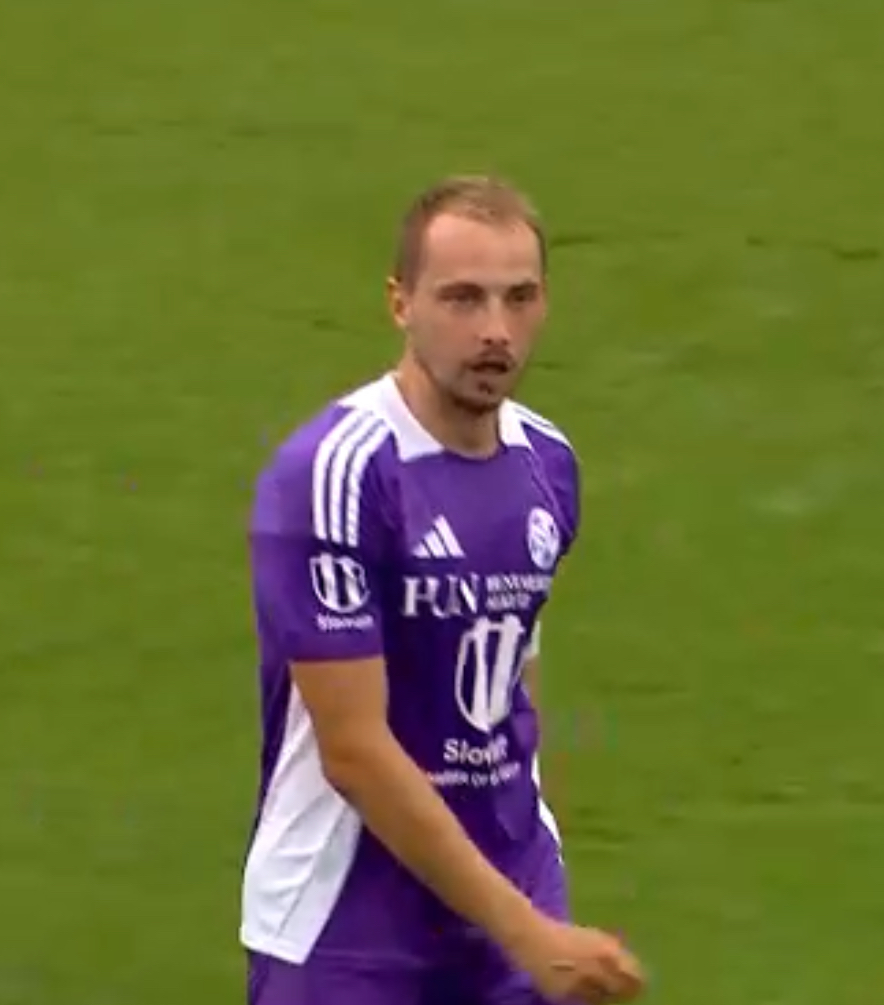
- Šimko in 2025

Personal information
- Date of birth: 24 May 1998 (age 28)
- Place of birth: Žiar nad Hronom, Slovakia
- Height: 1.87 m (6 ft 2 in)
- Positions: Centre-back; defensive midfielder

Team information
- Current team: KFC Komárno
- Number: 3

Youth career
- FK Žiar nad Hronom
- –2015: Dukla Banská Bystrica

Senior career*
Years	Team	Apps	(Gls)
2017–2019	Dunajská Streda B		
2018	MFK Zvolen (loan)	1	(0)
2019	KFC Komárno (loan)	1	(1)
2019–2020	KFC Komárno	15	(0)
2020	Vysočina Jihlava	2	(0)
2020–	KFC Komárno	160	(16)

International career
2014	Slovakia U16	5	(1)
2014	Slovakia U17	15	(1)
2017	Slovakia U19	2	(0)
- * Club domestic league appearances and goals as of 22 September 2026

Martin Šimko (born 24 May 1998) is a Slovak professional footballer who plays for Slovak First Football League club KFC Komárno, as a centre back or a defensive midfielder. He captains the side.

Born in Žiar nad Hronom, Šimko started playing for Banská Bystrica and Dunajská Streda in the youth categories. He represented the Slovak U16, U17 and U18 national teams. He started making second-league starts in the spring of 2018 on loan in the Zvolen jersey and later joined KFC Komárno. He transferred to FC Vysočina Jihlava in 2020. Later that year he returned to Komárno, where he won his first trophy after the club won the second division.

== Club career ==
=== Early career ===
Šimko played for the FK Dukla Banská Bystrica youth academy before joining the reserve team of FC DAC Dunajská Streda. Following loan moves to MFK Zvolen and KFC Komárno, he permanently joined the latter club.

=== Vysočina Jihlava ===
On 10 January 2020, it was announced that Šimko had joined Czech National Football League side FC Vysočina Jihlava. Following the departure of Mohamed Tijani, the Jihlava management decided to sign Šimko as a back-up.

=== KFC Komárno ===
In 2020, Šimko returned to KFC Komárno, becoming the clubs new captain. In the autumn part of the 2023–24 2. Liga season, he was one of the best players for Komárno. He scored six goals and assisted 2 against Humenne, Púchov and Spišská Nová Ves. His performances led him to be voted the best player in the league. In the same season, Komárno celebrated winning the 2. Liga after catching up to title favorites Tatran Presov, who went on a bad run of results near the end of the season. Šimko’s first top flight goal came in a game against MŠK Žilina, scoring the winning goal of a historic 1–0 victory where he converted a header after a cross from Viktor Sliacky. He scored both a goal and an own goal in a 2–1 loss against AS Trenčín on 26 July 2025.

== Honors ==
KFC Komárno

- 2. Liga: 2023–24
