= Radoslav Školník =

Slovak footballer

Personal information
- Date of birth: 14 November 1979 (age 46)
- Place of birth: Košice, Czechoslovakia
- Height: 1.87 m (6 ft 2 in)
- Position: Centre back

Youth career
- –1998: 1. FC Košice

Senior career*
Years	Team	Apps	(Gls)
1998–2003	1.FC Košice		
2003–2005	MFK Ružomberok		
2005	Ličartovce		
2005–2010	MFK Košice	67	(2)
2010	FK Košice-Barca		
2010–2014	FK Turkon Vyšné Opátske		
2014–2016	Slovan Velky Folkmar		
- * Club domestic league appearances and goals

Radoslav Školník (born 14 November 1979 in Košice) is a former Slovak football defender who last played for Slovan Velky Folkmar.

== Career statistics ==
Club	Season	Corgoň Liga		Slovak Cup		Europe		Total	
Club	Season	Pld	GF	Pld	GF	Pld	GF	Pld	GF
MFK Košice	2006/07	20	1	1	0	0	0	21	1
MFK Košice	2007/08	28	0	6	0	0	0	34	0
MFK Košice	2008/09	15	1	3	0	0	0	18	1
MFK Košice	2009/10	4	0	2	0	0	0	6	0
Total		67	2	12	0	0	0	79	2

^{Last updated: 28 December 2009}
