= Róbert Cicman =

Slovak footballer

Personal information
- Full name: Róbert Cicman
- Date of birth: 3 September 1984 (age 42)
- Place of birth: Košice, Czechoslovakia
- Height: 1.88 m (6 ft 2 in)
- Position: Centre-back

Team information
- Current team: FK Považská Sokoľ

Youth career
- Košice

Senior career*
Years	Team	Apps	(Gls)
2002–2004	Košice	2	(0)
2004–2005	Steel Trans Ličartovce		
2005–2006	Košice B		
2006–2011	Košice	144	(8)
2011–2012	Slavia Prague	28	(0)
2013	Nitra	11	(1)
2014	Sandecja Nowy Sącz	19	(0)
2015–2016	Haniska	36	(4)
2016–2019	Lokomotíva Košice	85	(10)
2019–2020	Slavoj Trebišov	15	(5)
2019–2023	Čaňa		
2023–	FK Považská Sokoľ		
- * Club domestic league appearances and goals as of 7 January 2023

Róbert Cicman (born 3 September 1984) is a Slovak professional footballer who plays as a centre-back for FK Považská Sokoľ.

== Career statistics ==
As of 31 December 2011

Club performance			League		Cup		Continental		Total	
Season	Club	League	Apps	Goals	Apps	Goals	Apps	Goals	Apps	Goals
Slovakia			League		Slovak Cup		Europe		Total	
2006–07	MFK Košice	Corgoň Liga	21	1	0	0	0	0	21	1
2007–08	MFK Košice	Corgoň Liga	31	1	4	0	0	0	35	1
2008–09	MFK Košice	Corgoň Liga	29	5	7	1	0	0	36	6
2009–10	MFK Košice	Corgoň Liga	32	1	3	0	4	1	39	2
2010–11	MFK Košice	Corgoň Liga	31	0	1	0	0	0	32	0
Czech Republic			League		Czech Cup		Europe		Total	
2011–12	Slavia Prague	Gambrinus liga	7	0	0	0	0	0	7	0
Total	Slovakia		144	8	15	1	4	1	163	10
Total	Czech Republic		7	0	0	0	0	0	7	0
Career total			151	8	15	1	4	1	170	10

== Honours ==
MFK Košice

- Slovak Cup: 2008–09
