= Adam Krčík =

Slovak footballer (born 1996)

Personal information
- Full name: Adam Krčík
- Date of birth: 16 March 1996 (age 30)
- Place of birth: Prievidza, Slovakia
- Height: 1.80 m (5 ft 11 in)
- Position: Right-back

Team information
- Current team: Komárno
- Number: 37

Youth career
- –2015: Baník Prievidza
- 2011–2013: → Senica (loan)
- 2013–2014: → Skalica (loan)
- 2014–2015: → Senica (loan)

Senior career*
Years	Team	Apps	(Gls)
2015–2016	Slovan Duslo Šaľa	18	(0)
2016–2017	Ostbahn XI	45	(6)
2018	Baník Prievidza	16	(1)
2018–2019	Znojmo	10	(0)
2019	Baník Prievidza	11	(0)
2019–2022	Tatran Liptovský Mikuláš	77	(2)
2022–2023	Karviná	10	(0)
2023	→ Skalica (loan)	14	(0)
2023–2025	Skalica	48	(1)
2025–	Komárno	30	(0)
- * Club domestic league appearances and goals as of 22 September 2026

Adam Krčík (born 16 March 1996) is a Slovak footballer who plays for Komárno as a right-back.

== Club career ==
=== MFK Tatran Liptovský Mikuláš ===
Adam Krčík made his Fortuna Liga debut for Tatran Liptovský Mikuláš against Slovan Bratislava on 24 July 2021.
