= 2023–24 2. Liga (Slovakia) =

2. Liga
- Season: 2023–24
- Dates: 28 July 2023 – 17 May 2024
- Champions: KFC Komárno
- Promoted: KFC Komárno
- Relegated: MFK Dolný Kubín; FK Spišská Nová Ves
- Matches: 240
- Goals: 734 (3.06 per match)
- Top goalscorer: Jozef Dolný (18)

The 2023–24 2. Liga was the 31st season of the 2. Liga in Slovakia, since its establishment in 1993.

== Teams ==
=== Team changes ===
Promoted from 2022–23 3. Liga	Relegated from 2022–23 Fortuna liga	Promoted to 2023–24 Fortuna liga	Relegated to 2023–24 3. Liga
OFK Malženice; FK Spišská Nová Ves	Liptovský Mikuláš	FC Košice	Rača; Dubnica

=== Stadiums and locations ===
Location of teams in Slovak 2. liga 2023–24

Team	Location	Stadium	Capacity
Liptovský Mikuláš	Liptovský Mikuláš	Stadium Liptovský Mikuláš	1,950
FC ŠTK 1914 Šamorín	Šamorín	Pomlé Stadium	1,950
MŠK Púchov	Púchov	Mestský štadión Púchov	6,614
KFC Komárno	Komárno	Mestský štadión Komárno	1,250
FC Petržalka	Bratislava	Štadión FC Petržalka	1,600
FK Slavoj Trebišov	Trebišov	Štadión Slavoj Trebišov	2,000
MŠK Žilina B	Žilina	Štadión pod Dubňom	11,258
Humenné	Humenné	Štadión Humenné	1,806
Považská Bystrica	Považská Bystrica	Štadión MŠK Považská Bystrica	2,500
1. FC Tatran Prešov	Prešov	Štadión ŠK FC Ličartovce	1,400
FK Pohronie	Žiar nad Hronom	Mestský štadión Žiar nad Hronom	2,309
Spartak Myjava	Myjava	Stadium Myjava	2,709
MFK Dolný Kubín	Dolný Kubín	Stadium MUDr. Ivan Chodák	1,950
Slovan Bratislava U21	Bratislava	Štadión Pasienky	11,401
FK Spišská Nová Ves	Spišská Nová Ves	Mestský štadión Spišská Nová Ves	1650
OFK Malženice	Malženice	OFK Dynamo Malženice Stadium	500

=== Personnel and kits ===
Note: Flags indicate national team as has been defined under FIFA eligibility rules. Players and Managers may hold more than one non-FIFA nationality.

Team	Head coach	Captain	Kit manufacturer	Shirt sponsor
FK Slavoj Trebišov	(Slovakia) Ondrej Desiatnik	(Slovakia) Tomáš Ilinjo	(Germany) Adidas	Armstav
MŠK Žilina B	(Slovakia) Vladimír Veselý	(Slovakia) Dominik Šnajder	(United States) Nike	Preto
KFC Komárno	(Slovakia) Mikuláš Radványi	(Slovakia) Martin Šimko	(Germany) Adidas	MOL
FC Petržalka	(Slovakia) Michal Kuruc	(Slovakia) Filip Oršula	(Italy) Erreà	PORTUM Towers
FC ŠTK 1914 Šamorín	(Estonia) Vladimir Vassiljev	(Slovakia) Lukáš Leginus	(Italy) Kappa	Slovnaft
MŠK Púchov	(Slovakia) Marián Zimen	(Slovakia) Matej Loduha	(Germany) Jako	reinoo
FK Humenné	(Slovakia) Ľubomír Reiter	(Slovakia) Erik Streňo	(Italy) Sportika	Triada
MŠK Považská Bystrica	(Slovakia) Peter Jakuš	(Slovakia) Dušan Kucharčík	(Denmark) Hummel	
1. FC Tatran Prešov	(Slovakia) Marek Petruš	(Slovakia) Jozef Dolný	(United States) Nike	Niké
FK Pohronie	(Slovakia) Norbert Gula	(Slovakia) Dominik Straňák	(Italy) Erreà	REMESLO
MFK Dolný Kubín	(Czech Republic) Radomír Korytář	(Slovakia) Lukáš Lupták	(Slovakia) 3b	ORAVing
MFK Tatran Liptovský Mikuláš	(Slovakia) Ivan Lišivka	(Slovakia) Tomáš Gerát	(Italy) Kappa	VEREX
Slovan Bratislava U21	(Slovakia) Vladimír Gála	(Slovakia) Samuel Habodasz	(Germany) Adidas	Niké
Spartak Myjava	(Slovakia) Ladislav Hudec	(Slovakia) Samuel Flamik	(Germany) Erima	NAD - RESS
FK Spišská Nová Ves	(Slovakia) Branislav Ondáš	(Slovakia) Marek Janečka	(Slovakia) 3b	Brantner Nova
OFK Malženice	(Slovakia) Pavol Bartoš	(Slovakia) Matej Rehák	(Germany) Jako	Macho color

== League table ==
Pos	Team	Pld	W	D	L	GF	GA	GD	Pts	Promotion, qualification or relegation
1	Komárno (C, P)	30	21	4	5	64	28	+36	67	Promotion to Niké liga
2	Petržalka (Q)	30	19	7	4	64	29	+35	64	Qualification to Promotion play-offs
3	Tatran Prešov	30	19	6	5	53	21	+32	63	
4	Humenné	30	14	8	8	43	32	+11	50	
5	Púchov	30	14	5	11	54	49	+5	47	
6	Považská Bystrica	30	12	11	7	48	38	+10	47	
7	Spartak Myjava	30	12	8	10	42	42	0	44	
8	Liptovský Mikuláš	30	13	3	14	53	48	+5	42	
9	Žilina B	30	12	4	14	57	62	−5	40	
10	Pohronie	30	11	6	13	44	50	−6	39	
11	Šamorín	30	10	8	12	49	56	−7	38	
12	Slovan Bratislava U21	30	10	6	14	46	55	−9	36	
13	Slavoj Trebišov	30	10	5	15	34	50	−16	35	
14	Malženice	30	6	7	17	34	51	−17	25	
15	Dolný Kubín (R)	30	4	8	18	27	68	−41	20	Relegation to 3. Liga
16	Spišská Nová Ves (R)	30	3	4	23	22	55	−33	13	Relegation to 3. Liga

Source: Futbalnet (in Slovak)
Rules for classification: 1) Points; 2) Head-to-head points; 3) Head-to-head goal difference; 4) Head-to-head away goals scored; 5) Play-off.
(C) Champions; (P) Promoted; (Q) Qualified for the phase indicated; (R) Relegated

== Results ==
Each team plays home-and-away against every other team in the league, for a total of 30 matches each.

Home \ Away	DK	POH	HUM	KFC	MAL	MYJ	PET	PB	PÚC	TRE	SJN	SNV	LMI	PRE	ŠAM	ZAB
Dolný Kubín		1–4	0–0	4–3	0–3	2–1	1–1	1–1	0–4	1–2	0–1	2–1	2–2	0–3	4–0	1–2
Pohronie	1–1		1–2	0–2	1–0	2–0	2–4	0–0	0–3	3–2	2–1	4–3	1–1	0–3	2–0	0–2
Humenné	5–0	1–0		0–1	2–1	1–2	0–2	1–1	1–0	1–0	2–0	2–1	4–1	2–0	1–0	0–1
Komárno	1–0	4–0	1–1		0–0	1–1	1–2	2–0	7–1	2–0	5–2	2–0	3–2	3–1	2–0	3–0
Malženice	3–0	1–1	1–1	0–1		2–1	1–2	0–0	0–2	3–1	0–0	3–1	0–1	0–3 (Note: The match between Malženice and Prešov was awarded 0–3 in favor of Prešov, due to the unauthorized start of a player in the Malženice starting line-up.)	4–0	1–2
Myjava	4–1	2–1	0–0	2–0	1–1		2–2	0–4	3–0	2–3	1–4	2–1	2–1	2–1	1–1	1–0
Petržalka	4–0	2–0	2–1	3–1	2–2	0–1		0–1	4–2	2–0	5–1	2–0	2–1	0–0	0–0	5–1
Považská Bystrica	4–3	1–1	1–3	1–1	4–1	1–2	2–1		0–0	5–0	3–1	1–1	0–1	1–1	2–2	2–1
Púchov	0–0	0–4	0–1	0–1	2–0	2–1	5–0	1–1		1–2	2–2	2–0	2–0	3–2	1–6	2–2
Slavoj Trebišov	1–1	0–3	1–1	1–3	2–0	3–0 (Note: The match between Trebišov and Myjava was awarded 3–0 in favor of Trebišov, due to the failure of Myjava players to attend the match in Trebišov.)	1–2	1–2	0–4		1–0	1–0	2–0	0–1	1–2	2–2
Slovan U21	4–0	0–3	5–2	1–3	3–2	1–3	0–0	2–0	2–4	0–0		3–0	0–5	0–0	0–3	5–2
Spišská Nová Ves	1–1	0–1	2–3	0–1	3–0	0–0	0–2	2–0	0–1	3–0	0–2		1–2	0–1	0–0	1–2
Liptovský Mikuláš	2–1	5–2	1–0	0–2	4–2	1–1	2–4	1–2	1–3	1–2	3–1	5–0		0–2	2–1	5–2
Prešov	3–0	2–0	0–0	2–0	5–0	2–1	1–1	4–1	1–0	3–2	0–0	2–0	1–0		2–0	4–2
Šamorín	4–0	5–3	2–2	1–4	2–0	2–2	0–7	2–3	2–5	2–2	3–2	3–0	3–1	2–1		1–1
Žilina B	3–0	2–2	5–3	3–4	4–3	2–1	0–1	2–4	6–2	0–1	1–3	5–1	0–2	1–2	1–0	

Source: Futbalnet (in Slovak)
Legend: Blue = home team win; Yellow = draw; Red = away team win.

== Season statistics ==
As of 17 May 2024

=== Top goalscorers ===
Rank	Player	Club	Goals
1	(Slovakia) Jozef Dolný	Prešov	18
2	(Slovakia) Lukáš Letenay	Púchov	15
2	(Slovakia) Peter Mazan	Pohronie	15
3	(Slovakia) Patrik Danek	Petržalka	14
3	(Slovakia) Lukáš Slávik	Považská Bystrica	14
6	(Czech Republic) Patrik Voleský	Komárno	12
7	(Slovakia) Lukáš Gašparovič	Petržalka	11
7	(Ghana) Frank Appiah	Liptovský Mikuláš	11
9	(Slovakia) Richard Bartoš	Liptovský Mikuláš	10
9	(Nigeria) Elvis Isaac	Slovan U23	10
9	(Sweden) Hugo Ahl	Humenné	10
9	(Montenegro) Matija Krivokapić	Šamorín	10

=== Clean sheets ===
Rank	Player	Club	Clean sheets
1	(Ukraine) Maksym Kuchynskyi	Prešov	17
2	(Slovakia) Filip Dlubáč	Komárno	13
3	(Slovakia) Samuel Vavrúš	Púchov	11
3	(Czech Republic) Pavel Halouska	Petržalka	11
5	(Slovakia) Adrián Knurovský	Humenné	10
6	(Slovakia) Adam Hrdina	Slovan B	7
7	(Slovakia) Dávid Slávik	Trebišov	6
8	(Slovakia) Radovan Hodál	Pov.Bystrica	5

=== Discipline ===
As of 23 May 2024

==== Player ====
- Most yellow cards: 11
  - (Slovakia) Denis Martinko (Sp. nová Ves)
- Most red cards: 2
  - 3 players

==== Club ====
- Most yellow cards: 84
  - Humenné
- Most red cards: 10
  - Púchov

== See also ==
- 2023–24 Slovak Cup
- 2023–24 Slovak First Football League
- List of Slovak football transfers summer 2023
- List of Slovak football transfers winter 2023–24
- List of foreign Slovak First League players
