= Nándor Tamás =

Romanian footballer

Personal information
- Full name: Nándor Károly Tamás
- Date of birth: 24 October 2000 (age 26)
- Place of birth: Târgu Secuiesc, Romania
- Height: 1.71 m (5 ft 7 in)
- Position: Winger

Team information
- Current team: Komárno
- Number: 22

Youth career
- –2015: KSE Târgu Secuiesc
- 2015–2017: Csíkszereda
- 2017–2018: Puskás Akadémia

Senior career*
Years	Team	Apps	(Gls)
2018–2024	Puskás Akadémia	23	(2)
2018–2021	Puskás Akadémia II	20	(5)
2018–2021	→ Csákvár (loan)	50	(9)
2021	→ Sepsi OSK (loan)	14	(1)
2022–2024	→ Csákvár (loan)	79	(5)
2024–	Komárno	66	(3)

International career
2017	Romania U17	1	(0)
2017	Romania U18	4	(1)
- * Club domestic league appearances and goals as of 8 November 2026

Nándor Károly Tamás (born 24 October 2000) is a Romanian professional footballer who plays as a winger for Slovak First Football League club Komárno.

== Club career ==
He made his NB I debut playing for Puskás Akadémia in a 3–0 home win against Fehérvár on 3 February 2019.

== International career ==
Nándor Tamás played four games and scored one goal for Romania's under 18 team in 2017 under the guidance of coach Florin Bratu.

== Personal life ==
He is of Hungarian ethnicity.

== Career statistics ==
=== Club ===
As of match played 8 November 2026

Appearances and goals by club, season and competition
Club	Season	League			National cup (Note: Includes Magyar Kupa, Cupa României, Slovak Cup)		Europe		Other		Total	
Club	Season	Division	Apps	Goals	Apps	Goals	Apps	Goals	Apps	Goals	Apps	Goals
Puskás Akadémia II	2017–18	NB III	7	1	—		—		—		7	1
Puskás Akadémia II	2018–19	NB III	6	2	—		—		—		6	2
Puskás Akadémia II	2019–20	NB III	4	1	—		—		—		4	1
Puskás Akadémia II	2020–21	NB III	3	1	—		—		—		3	1
Puskás Akadémia II	Total		20	5	—		—		—		20	5
Csákvár (loan)	2017–18	NB II	14	1	0	0	—		—		14	1
Csákvár (loan)	2018–19	NB II	21	4	0	0	—		—		6	2
Csákvár (loan)	2019–20	NB II	12	3	0	0	—		—		4	1
Csákvár (loan)	2020–21	NB II	3	1	0	0	—		—		3	1
Csákvár (loan)	2021–22	NB II	14	0	0	0	—		—		14	0
Csákvár (loan)	2022–23	NB II	35	0	1	0	—		—		36	0
Csákvár (loan)	2023–24	NB II	31	5	1	1	—		—		32	6
Csákvár (loan)	Total		130	14	2	1	—		—		132	15
Puskás Akadémia	2018–19	NB I	8	1	2	0	—		—		10	1
Puskás Akadémia	2019–20	NB I	7	1	3	5	—		—		10	6
Puskás Akadémia	2020–21	NB I	8	0	2	0	0	0	—		10	0
Puskás Akadémia	Total		23	2	7	5	0	0	—		30	7
Sepsi OSK (loan)	2020–21	Liga I	10	1	0	0	—		—		10	1
Sepsi OSK (loan)	2021–22	Liga I	4	0	1	0	—		—		5	0
Sepsi OSK (loan)	Total		14	1	1	0	—		—		15	1
Komárno	2024–25	Slovak First Football League	30	1	2	0	—		—		32	1
Komárno	2025–26	Slovak First Football League	28	2	3	0	—		2 (Note: Appearances in Slovak First Football League promotion/relegation play-offs)	0	33	2
Komárno	2026–27	Slovak First Football League	8	0	0	0	—		—		8	0
Komárno	Total		66	3	5	0	—		2	0	73	3
Career total			254	25	15	6	0	0	2	0	270	31
