= Timon Dobias =

Slovak footballer

Personal information
- Full name: Timon Dobias
- Date of birth: 28 July 1989 (age 37)
- Place of birth: Košice, Czechoslovakia
- Height: 1.82 m (5 ft 11 1/2 in)
- Positions: Defensive midfielder; centre back

Youth career
- MFK Košice

Senior career*
Years	Team	Apps	(Gls)
2008–2012	MFK Košice	75	(1)
2013–2015	→ Košice – Krásna (loan)	38	(1)
2017–2018	MFK Spartak Medzev	6	(0)
2017–2019	FC Košice	55	(8)

International career
2007–2008	Slovakia U19	10	(0)
2009	Slovakia U21	3	(0)
- * Club domestic league appearances and goals

Timon Dobias (born 28 July 1989) is a retired Slovak football player.

== Club career ==
Dobias is a product of 1. FC Košice, later renamed to MFK, youth squads. He made his Corgoň Liga debut two days before his 19th birthday in a 1–0 away win against Dukla Banská Bystrica. He scored his first goal in a 1–0 home win against DAC Dunajská Streda on 5 March 2011.

On 31 July 2019 it was announced, that Dobias had decided to retire due to chronic health problems, spending most of his career in clubs from Košice Region.

== Career statistics ==
As of 18 June 2011

Club performance			League		Cup		Continental		Total	
Season	Club	League	Apps	Goals	Apps	Goals	Apps	Goals	Apps	Goals
Slovakia			League		Slovak Cup		Europe		Total	
2008–09	MFK Košice	Corgoň Liga	16	0	4	0	0	0	20	0
2009–10	MFK Košice	Corgoň Liga	19	0	4	0	4	0	27	0
2010–11	MFK Košice	Corgoň Liga	27	1	0	0	0	0	27	1
Career total			62	1	8	0	4	0	74	1
