= Ondřej Rudzan =

Czech footballer (born 1998)

Personal information
- Full name: Ondřej Rudzan
- Date of birth: 25 July 1998 (age 28)
- Place of birth: Czech Republic
- Height: 1.87 m (6 ft 2 in)
- Position: Centre-back

Team information
- Current team: PSIM Yogyakarta
- Number: 24

Youth career
- –2017: Mladá Boleslav

Senior career*
Years	Team	Apps	(Gls)
2018–2021	Mladá Boleslav B		
2019	→ Varnsdorf (loan)	12	(1)
2021–2024	Skalica	52	(3)
2024–2026	KFC Komarno	59	(5)
2026–	PSIM Yogyakarta	1	(0)
- * Club domestic league appearances and goals as of 5 September 2026

Ondřej Rudzan (born 25 July 1998) is a Czech professional footballer who plays as a centre-back for Super League club PSIM Yogyakarta.

== Club career ==
He made his professional Fortuna Liga debut for MFK Skalica on 17 July 2022 against Ružomberok.

Rudzan left Skalica to join Komárno on 6 July 2024.

On 11 May 2025, Rudzan scored the winning goal against Zemplín Michalovce in a 5:4 win.

In July 2026, Rudzan moved abroad for the first time in his career, signing for Indonesian Super League club PSIM Yogyakarta. The transfer was officially announced on 23 July 2026, with PSIM describing him as a left-sided defender and a recommendation of head coach Jean-Paul van Gastel. He made his competitive debut for the club on 5 September 2026 in a 1–1 draw against Persita Tangerang.
