= Lukáš Leginus =

Slovak footballer

Personal information
- Full name: Lukáš Leginus
- Date of birth: 24 April 2000 (age 26)
- Place of birth: Veľký Biel, Slovakia
- Height: 1.86 m (6 ft 1 in)
- Position: Right winger

Team information
- Current team: KFC Komárno

Youth career
- –2009: SFM Senec
- 2009–2019: Slovan Bratislava
- 2018–2019: → DAC Dunajská Streda (loan)

Senior career*
Years	Team	Apps	(Gls)
2019	Slovan Bratislava B		
2019−2024	ŠTK Šamorín	100	(20)
2022−2023	→ DAC Dunajská Streda (loan)	4	(0)
2024−2026	Skalica	44	(4)
2026-	KFC Komárno	0	(0)
- * Club domestic league appearances and goals as of 25 May 2026

Lukáš Leginus (born 24 April 2000) is a Slovak footballer who plays for Skalica of the Fortuna Liga as a right-winger.

== Club career ==
=== DAC Dunajská Streda ===
Leginus made his professional Fortuna Liga debut for DAC in a home fixture against FK Železiarne Podbrezová on 23 October 2022, replacing Ammar Ramadan in the 57th minute of the game.
