= KFC Komárno =

Slovak football club

Komárno
- Full name: Komárňanský futbalový club, Komáromi Football Club
- Nickname: Lilák
- Short name: KFC
- Founded: 29 April 1900; 126 years ago (as Komáromi Labdarúgó Társaság)
- Ground: ViOn Aréna, Mestský štadión Komárno (in reconstruction)
- Capacity: 4,408; 5,000 (planned)
- Head coach: Norbert Czibor
- League: Slovak First Football League
- 2025–26: Slovak First Football League, 11th of 12
- Website: http://www.kfckomarno.sk/
Home colours	Away colours	Third colours

KFC Komárno is a Slovak football club based in the town of Komárno. The club was founded on 29 April 1900 in Komárom, Kingdom of Hungary in the main hall of the town hall by the initialization of András Beliczay. The team's colours are purple and white. The motto of the team is "Kedv, Kitartás, Küzdelem", this is represented in the logo as K.K.K., translation from Hungarian to English: Spirit, Endurance, Fight.

== History ==
The team was founded in 1900, 29 May as Komáromi Labdarúgó Társaság. After two years, in 1902 they adopted the name Komáromi Football Club (KFC). The historical KFC first match played on 29 July 1900 against Budapest Kistétény, the team lost 0–5, after half 0–1. The club is focused on the education of young talented players. Agile KFC club director Gyula Höltzl, so in 1904 organized the first ever football students match to the territory of the present Slovakia. One of the most successful pupil was Szilárd Németh former Slovak second highest topscorer (22 goals) of all time, second only to Róbert Vittek with (23 goals).

== Honours ==
=== League ===
- Nemzeti Bajnokság III:
  - Winners (1): 1943–44
- Slovak Second Division (1993–present)
  - Winners (1): 2023–24

== Supporters ==
KFC Komárno supporters are called Gruppo Porcaccioni.

== Current squad ==
As of 15 September 2026 Note: Flags indicate national team as defined under FIFA eligibility rules; some limited exceptions apply. Players may hold more than one non-FIFA nationality.

No.	Pos.	Nation	Player
1	GK	SVK	Filip Dlubac
3	DF	SVK	Martin Šimko (captain)
4	DF	SUI	Nikita Vlasenko
5	DF	SVK	Dominik Špiriak
6	MF	CZE	Dan Ožvolda
7	MF	MGL	Ganbayar Ganbold
8	DF	SVK	Šimon Šmehýl
9	FW	SVK	Jakub Sylvestr
10	MF	SVK	Kristóf Domonkos
12	MF	CZE	Dominik Žák
14	MF	SVK	Filip Kiss
17	MF	CMR	Christian Bayemi
18	DF	CZE	Jakub Palán

No.	Pos.	Nation	Player
19	FW	NGR	Yunusa Muritala
20	DF	BRA	Matheus Leoni
21	DF	SVK	Róbert Pillár
22	FW	ROU	Nándor Tamás
23	MF	SVK	Ján Bernát
26	GK	HUN	Erik Gyurákovics
32	GK	SVK	Branislav Pindroch
37	DF	SVK	Adam Krčík
44	MF	UKR	Andriy Gavrylenko (on loan from Železiarne Podbrezová)
55	FW	NGR	Okiki Akinwande (on loan from Karviná B)
71	FW	SVK	Lukáš Leginus
77	MF	SVK	Andy Masaryk
93	DF	HUN	Zsombor Mitring
—	MF	HUN	István Vojtko

For recent transfers, see List of Slovak football transfers summer 2026

== Staff ==
Position	Name
Manager	(Slovakia) Norbert Czibor
Assistant manager	(Slovakia) Kornél Saláta
Goalkeeping coach	(Slovakia) Marián Kello

== Notable players ==
The following players had won international caps for their respective countries' senior national team. Players whose name is listed in bold represented their countries while playing for KFC.

- (Hungary) Zoltán Czibor
- (Czechoslovakia) Ferdinand Daučík
- (Mongolia) **Ganbayar Ganbold**
- (Czechoslovakia) Koloman Gögh
- (Czechoslovakia) Ladislav Józsa
- (Slovakia) Filip Kiss
- (Hungary) Imre Payer
- (Hungary) Tamás Priskin
- (Pakistan) Navid Rahman
- (Slovakia) Kornel Saláta
- (Niger) Modibo Sidibé
- (Czech Republic) Marek Střeštík
- (Slovakia) Jakub Sylvestr
- (Czechoslovakia) Juraj Szikora

== Managers ==
- (Slovakia) Peter Lérant (2011)
- (Slovakia) Mikuláš Radványi (2012)
- (Slovakia) Peter Lérant (2016)
- (Slovakia) Richard Matovič (2016–2017)
- (Slovakia) Peter Zelenský (2017–2018)
- (Slovakia) Jozef Olejník (2018–2019)
- (Hungary) István Szijjártó (caretaker) (2019)
- (Slovakia) Miroslav Karhan (2019–2020)
- (Hungary) István Szijjártó (caretaker) (2020)
- (Slovakia) Szilárd Németh (2020–2021)
- (Slovakia) Mikuláš Radványi (2021–April 2026)
- (Slovakia) Norbert Czibor (Apr 2026–Oct 2026)
(Slovakia) Pavol Gregora (Oct 2026– )

== Seasons ==
Legend: GP – games played, W – wins, D – draws, L – losses, GF – goals for, GA – goals against, GD – goal difference, Pts – points, red background – relegation, green background – promotion, purple background – reorganization, change of group or competition

Hungary (1900–1919)
Sesaons	League	Level	GP	W	D	L	GF	GF	+/−	Pts	Position
1918/19	Vidéki bajnokság – Nyugati (I. osztály)	2	4	2	0	2	3	7	−4	4	4.
Czechoslovakia (1919–1938)
Sesaons	League	Level	GP	W	D	L	GF	GF	+/−	Pts	Position
1934/35	Slovensko-podkarpatská divízia - západ	2	18	6	3	9	28	39	-11	15	8.
1935/36	Slovensko-podkarpatská divízia - západ	2	18	8	3	7	32	34	-2	19	6.
1936/37	Slovensko-podkarpatská divízia - západ	2	20	7	6	7	32	46	-14	20	6.
1938/39	Slovensko-podkarpatská divízia - západ	2	20	8	4	8	52	34	+18	20	5.
Hungary (1939–1944)
Sesaons	League	Level	GP	W	D	L	GF	GF	+/−	Pts	Position
1939/40	Nemzeti bajnokság II – sk. Dunántúli	2	26	5	7	14	30	51	−21	17	13.
1940/41	Nemzeti bajnokság III – sk. Nyugati	3	22	4	2	16	21	58	−37	10	11.
1941/42	Északdunántúli kerület – sk. A (I. osztály)	4	26	17	5	4	82	35	+47	39	2.
1942/43	Nemzeti bajnokság III – sk. Budakörnyéki	3	26	15	2	9	55	49	+6	32	5.
1943/44	Nemzeti bajnokság III – sk. Dunántúli	3	26	16	4	6	93	50	+43	36	1.
Czechoslovakia (1945–1993)
Sesaons	League	Level	GP	W	D	L	GF	GF	+/−	Pts	Position
1955	Oblastná súťaž - Skupina E	3	22	15	2	5	59	40	+19	32	3.
1956	Oblastná súťaž - Skupina E	3	22	11	1	10	45	37	+8	23	5.
1957/58	Oblastná súťaž - Skupina E	3	33	14	7	12	65	52	+13	35	6.
1958/59	Oblastná súťaž - Skupina E	3	26	10	3	13	44	45	-1	23	10.
1967/68	Krajský prebor – sk. Západ	4	26	9	4	13	27	45	−18	22	13.
1968/69	I. A trieda ZsFZ – sk. Sever	5	26	13	2	11	55	36	+19	28	6.
1969/70	I. A trieda ZsFZ – sk. Jihovýchod	6	24	15	4	5	56	23	+33	34	1.
1970/71	Krajský prebor – sk. Západ	5	26	10	2	15	28	52	−24	19	12.
1971/72	Krajský prebor – sk. Západ	5	26	9	5	12	35	42	−7	23	10.
1972/73	Krajský prebor – sk. Západ	5	23	13	3	7	46	30	+16	29	2.
1973/74	Krajský prebor – sk. Západ	5	28	16	3	9	65	27	+38	35	3.
1974/75	Krajský prebor – sk. Západ	5	28	15	5	8	38	29	+9	35	1.
1975/76	Divízia E	4	25	11	5	10	34	39	−5	27	5.
1976/77	Divízia E	4	26	15	6	5	41	23	+18	36	1.
1977/78	1. slovenská národná fotbalová liga	2	30	4	9	17	36	74	−38	17	16.
1978/79	Divízia – sk. Západ	3	22	11	6	5	40	26	+14	28	2.
1979/80	Divízia – sk. Západ	3	22	10	4	8	39	34	+5	24	4.
1980/81	Divízia – sk. Západ	3	22	10	5	7	39	33	+6	25	4.
1981/82	Divízia – sk. Západ	3	30	13	4	13	49	58	−9	30	9.
1982/83	Divízia – sk. Západ	3	30	10	4	16	29	54	−25	24	15.
1983/84	Divízia – sk. Západ	3	30	14	7	9	45	41	+4	35	4.
1984/85	Divízia – sk. Západ	3	30	13	5	12	44	44	0	31	7.
1985/86	2. SNFL – sk. Západ	3	30	11	6	13	34	54	−20	28	13.
1986/87	Divízia – sk. Západ (Juhovýchod)	4	26	13	5	8	62	35	+28	31	5,
1987/88	Divízia – sk. Západ (Juhovýchod)	4	30	19	5	6	73	35	+38	43	3.
1988/89	Divízia – sk. Západ (Juhovýchod)	4	30	18	4	8	66	37	+29	40	2.
1989/90	Divízia – sk. Západ (Juhovýchod)	4	30	15	3	12	59	44	+15	33	5.
1990/91	Divízia – sk. Západ (Juhovýchod)	4	30	12	4	14	52	32	+20	28	12.
1991/92	Divízia – sk. Západ (Juhovýchod)	4	30	9	13	8	34	34	0	31	8.
1992/93	Divízia – sk. Západ (Juhovýchod)	4	30	11	10	9	45	32	+13	32	6.
Slovakia (1993–)
Sesaons	League	Level	GP	W	D	L	GF	GF	+/−	Pts	Position
1993/94	4. liga ZsFZ	4	30	15	8	7	48	29	+19	38	4.
1994/95	3. liga – West	3	30	12	1	17	49	47	+2	37	9.
1995/96	3. liga – West	3	30	10	11	9	33	36	−3	41	7.
1996/97	3. liga – West	3	30	10	10	10	36	40	−4	40	8.
1997/98	3. liga – West	3	32	13	3	16	42	48	−6	42	9.
1998/99	3. liga – West	3	32	12	7	13	40	51	-11	43	10.
1999/00	3. liga – West	3	34	18	3	13	60	53	+7	57	6.
2000/01	3. liga – West	3	30	8	3	19	34	58	-24	27	16.
2001/02	4. liga ZsFZ – sk. Jihovýchod	4	30	14	6	10	52	46	+6	48	7.
2002/03	4. liga ZsFZ – sk. Jihovýchod	4	30	19	2	9	58	34	+24	59	2.
2003/04	3. liga – West	3	30	14	6	10	40	34	+6	45	6.
2004/05	3. liga – West	3	30	6	9	15	24	50	-26	27	14.
2005/06	3. liga – West	3	30	2	3	25	16	107	-91	9	16.
2006/07	4. liga - sk. Západ	4	30	10	3	17	38	54	-16	33	13.
2007/08	4. liga - sk. Západ	4	30	11	6	13	54	54	0	39	8.
2008/09	4. liga - sk. Západ	4	30	10	8	12	39	45	6	38	9.
2009/10	4. liga - sk. Západ	4	30	11	4	15	49	52	-3	37	8.
2010/11	4. liga - sk. Západ	4	30	23	3	4	78	21	57	72	1.
2011/12	3. liga – West	4	30	16	6	8	47	29	+18	54	4.
2012/13	3. liga – West	4	28	16	7	5	61	34	+27	55	3.
2013/14	3. liga – West	4	30	20	4	6	56	33	+23	64	2.
2014/15	3. liga – West	3	32	10	9	13	39	46	−7	39	11.
2015/16	3. liga – West	3	32	13	7	12	51	51	0	46	9.
2016/17	3. liga – West	3	36	23	9	4	83	32	+51	78	1.
2017/18	2. Slovak football league	2	30	12	7	11	49	58	−9	43	6.
2018/19	2. Slovak football league	2	30	13	7	10	48	38	-10	46	5.
2019/20	2. Slovak football league	2	18	5	5	8	19	28	-9	20	13.
2020/21	2. Slovak football league*	2	28	10	5	12	31	42	-11	38	8.
2021/22	2. Slovak football league	2	30	17	8	5	51	29	+22	59	4.
2022/23	2. Slovak football league	2	30	14	11	5	41	26	+15	53	3.
2023/24	2. Slovak football league	2	30	21	4	5	64	28	+36	67	1.
2024/25	Slovak First Football League	1	32	11	6	15	36	48	-12	39	8.
2025/26	Slovak First Football League	1	32	8	8	16	34	46	-12	32	11.

** = competition ended prematurely due to the COVID-19 pandemic
