= 2025 Slovak Cup final =

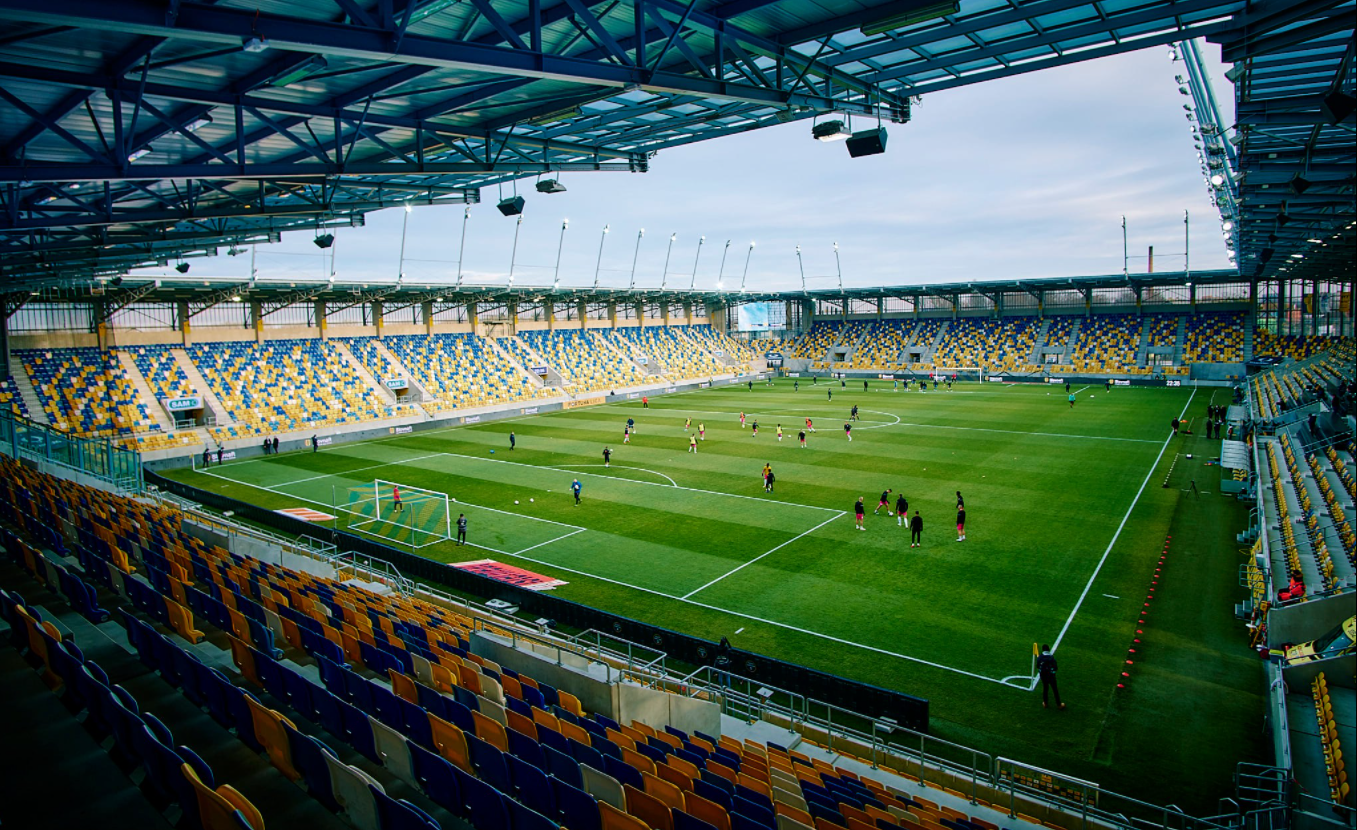
- DAC Aréna in Dunajská Streda held the final
- Event: 2024–25 Slovak Cup
Ružomberok	Spartak Trnava
0	1
- Date: 1 May 2025
- Venue: DAC Aréna, Dunajská Streda
- Referee: Michal Smolák
- Attendance: 9,437

The 2025 Slovak Cup final (known as the Slovnaft Cup for sponsorship reasons) was the final match of the 2024–25 Slovak Cup, the 56th season of the top cup competition in Slovak football. The match was played on 1 May 2025.

It was contested by MFK Ružomberok and FC Spartak Trnava. Both teams also previously met in the previous final. The match ended in a 0–1 victory for Spartak Trnava, which also means that Spartak Trnava won their 9th title. As winners, Spartak Trnava qualified for the first qualifying round of the 2025–26 UEFA Europa League.

== Teams ==
In the following table, finals until 1993 were in the Czechoslovak era, since 1994 were in the Slovak era.

Team	Previous final appearances (bold indicates winners)
Ružomberok	5 (2001, **2006**, 2018, 2020, **2024**)
Spartak Trnava	16 (**1971**, 1972, 1974, **1975**, **1980**, 1988, **1991**, 1996, **1998**, 2006, 2008, 2010, **2019**, **2022**, **2023**, 2024)

== Road to the final ==
Note: In all results below, the score of the finalist is given first (H: home; A: away; N: neutral venue).

Ružomberok (1)		Round	Spartak Trnava (1)
Opponent	Result	2024–25 Slovak Cup	Opponent	Result
Bye		Preliminary round	Bye
Bye		First round	Bye
Dynamo Diviaky (5)	9–0 (A)	Second round	ŠK Blava Jaslovské (4)	2–0 (A)
FK Podkonice (3)	3–2 (A)	Third round	OK Častkovce (3)	7–1 (A)
TJ Kostolné Kračany (5)	0–3 (A)	Fourth round	MFK Bytča (4)	4–1 (A)
KFC Komárno (1)	2–0 (H)	Round of 16	FK Železiarne Podbrezová (1)	1–1 (3–2 p) (A)
FC ViOn Zlaté Moravce (1)	2–1 (A)	Quarter-finals	MŠK Žilina (1)	2–0 (A)
MFK Dukla Banská Bystrica (1)	1–2 (A), 2–0 (H) (4–1 agg.)	Semi-finals	ŠK Slovan Bratislava (1)	2–1 (H), 1–2 (A) (3–3 agg.) (4–2 p)

== Match ==
=== Details ===
1 May 2025
15:00 (UTC+2)

Ružomberok	0–1	Spartak Trnava
	Report	Daniel 31'

DAC Aréna, Dunajská Streda
Attendance: 9,437
Referee: Michal Smolák

GK	33	(Czech Republic) Hugo Jan Bačkovský
RB	19	(Slovakia) Martin Gomola	(yellow card) 14'	(substituted off) 46'
CB	16	(Czech Republic) Daniel Köstl
LB	32	(Slovakia) Matúš Malý
RM	8	(Slovakia) Kristóf Domonkos
CM	11	(Slovakia) Samuel Lavrinčík
CM	6	(Slovakia) Timotej Múdry		(substituted off) 60'
LM	23	(Slovakia) Matej Madleňák		(substituted off) 82'
RW	14	(Czech Republic) Jan Hladík (c)	(yellow card) 90+8'
CF	15	(Slovakia) Štefan Gerec		(substituted off) 46'
LW	20	(Slovakia) Marián Chobot		(substituted off) 72'
Substitutes:
GK	1	(Slovakia) Dominik Ťapaj
DF	2	(Slovakia) Alexander Mojžiš		(substituted on) 46'
DF	3	(Slovakia) Ján Maslo
MF	4	(Slovakia) Oliver Luterán
MF	5	(Slovakia) Rudolf Božík
MF	7	(Czech Republic) Filip Souček		(substituted on) 60'
FW	9	(Czech Republic) David Huf		(substituted on) 46'
MF	17	(Slovakia) Adam Tučný		(substituted on) 72'
FW	18	(Slovakia) Martin Boďa		(substituted on) 82'
Manager:
(Czech Republic) Ondřej Smetana

GK	1	(Slovenia) Žiga Frelih	(yellow card) 90+9'
RB	4	(Czech Republic) Libor Holík
CB	2	(Slovakia) Lukáš Štetina
CB	21	(Slovakia) Patrick Karhan
LB	3	(Croatia) Roko Jureškin
RM	6	(Slovakia) Roman Procházka (c)
CM	80	(Slovenia) Adrian Zeljković		(substituted off) 90+1'
LM	14	(Czech Republic) Miloš Kratochvíl
RW	23	(Czech Republic) Erik Daniel		(substituted off) 90+6'
CF	57	(Slovakia) Michal Ďuriš		(substituted off) 78'
LW	97	(Ghana) Kelvin Ofori	(yellow card) 74'	(substituted off) 78'
Substitutes:
GK	72	(Slovakia) Martin Vantruba
FW	7	(Slovakia) Róbert Pich
MF	8	(Belgium) Milan Corryn
FW	17	(Slovakia) Jakub Paur		(substituted on) 78'
MF	20	(Slovakia) Filip Trello
MF	28	(Slovakia) Martin Bukata		(substituted on) 90+6'
MF	52	(Slovakia) Erik Sabo		(substituted on) 78'
DF	77	(Nigeria) Kazeem Bolaji		(substituted on) 90+1'
MF	88	(Burkina Faso) Cedric Badolo
Manager:
(Slovakia) Michal Gašparík

Assistant referees:
Dušan Štofik
Mário Roszbeck
Fourth official:
Marián Ruc
Video assistant referee:
Michal Očenáš
Assistant video assistant referee:
Ján Pozor

**Match rules**

- 90 minutes.
- 30 minutes of extra time if necessary.
- Penalty shoot-out if scores still level.

== See also ==
- 2024–25 Slovak Cup
- 2025–26 UEFA Europa League
