= 2024–25 FC Spartak Trnava season =

FC Spartak Trnava
2024–25 season
- Manager: Michal Gašparík
- Stadium: Anton Malatinský Stadium
- Slovak First Football League: 3rd
- Slovak Cup: Winners
- UEFA Conference League: Third qualifying round
- Top goalscorer: League: Kelvin Ofori (9); All: Michal Ďuriš (15)

The 2024–25 season was the 102nd season in the history of FC Spartak Trnava, and the club's 22nd consecutive season in Slovak First Football League. In addition to the domestic league, the team participated in the Slovak Cup and the UEFA Conference League, winning the former competition for the ninth time. As winners of the cup, Spartak Trnava qualified for the 2025–26 UEFA Europa League first qualifying round.

== Transfers ==
=== In ===
Pos.	Player	Transferred from	Fee	Date	Source
MF	Hugo Ahl (SWE)	Humenné (SVK)		3 July 2024	
MF	Miloš Kratochvíl (CZE)	Jablonec (CZE)	Undisclosed	3 July 2024	

=== Out ===
Pos.	Player	Transferred to	Fee	Date	Source
GK	Dominik Takáč (SVK)	Slovan Bratislava (SVK)		1 July 2024	
MF	Danilo Pantić (SRB)			2 July 2024	

== Most goals ==
Most goals in all competitions.

Name	Goals
(Slovakia) Michal Ďuriš	15
(Ghana) Kelvin Ofori	11
(Nigeria) Philip Azango	8
(Slovakia) Róbert Pich	6
(Slovakia) Jakub Paur	6

== Friendlies ==
=== Pre-season ===
22 June 2024 Friendly	Maribor (Slovenia)	2–1	(Slovakia) Spartak Trnava	Ormož, Slovenia
17:00	Barišić 9'; Paur 90+2' (o.g.)		Paur 76'	Referee: Teo Glažar

29 June 2024 Friendly	Bravo (Slovenia)	3–1	(Slovakia) Spartak Trnava	Brežice, Slovenia
10:30				Stadium: Stadion Brežice pomožno igrišče

5 July 2024 Friendly	Sparta Prague (Czech Republic)	3–0	(Slovakia) Spartak Trnava	Prague
15:00	Wiesner 62'; Olatunji 80'; Schánělec 89'			Stadium: Stadion Letná

13 July 2024 Friendly	TSV Hartberg (Austria)	1–1	(Slovakia) Spartak Trnava	Draßmarkt, Austria
15:00				Stadium: Sportplatz Draßmarkt

20 July 2024 Friendly	Spartak Trnava (Slovakia)	0–3	(England) Aston Villa	Trnava
16:00			Bailey 38'; Rogers 53'; Archer 90'	Stadium: Anton Malatinský Stadium; Attendance: 16,000

18 January 2025 Friendly	Spartak Trnava (Slovakia)	0–2	(Czech Republic) Bohemians 1905	Belek
14:00 EET		Report		Stadium: Arcadia Futbol Kompleksi - Field 1

23 January 2025 Friendly	Spartak Trnava (Slovakia)	2–1	(Bulgaria) Botev Plovdiv	Belek
17:30 EET	Kratochvíl 8'; Karhan 74'	Report	Karabelyov 25'	Stadium: Papillon Sports Centre - Field D

1 February 2025 Friendly	Spartak Trnava (Slovakia)	2–0	(Czech Republic) Líšeň	Trnava
12:00 CET	Michal Ďuriš 1:0 Philip Azango 2:0	Report		Stadium: City Arena – Anton Malatinský Stadium

== Competitions ==
=== Overall record ===
Competition	First match	Last match	Starting round	Record							
Competition	First match	Last match	Starting round	Pld	W	D	L	GF	GA	GD	Win %
Slovak First Football League	28 July 2024		Matchday 1	1	0	1	0	0	0	+0	0.00
Slovak Cup				0	0	0	0	0	0	+0	—
UEFA Conference League	25 July 2024		Second qualifying round	2	1	1	0	3	0	+3	50.00
Total				3	1	2	0	3	0	+3	33.33

Last updated: 1 August 2024
Source: Soccerway

=== Slovak First Football League ===
==== League table ====
Pos	Team	Pld	W	D	L	GF	GA	GD	Pts	Qualification
1	Slovan Bratislava	22	15	4	3	48	25	+23	49	Qualification for the championship group
2	Žilina	22	13	6	3	42	20	+22	45	Qualification for the championship group
3	Spartak Trnava	22	12	8	2	34	17	+17	44	Qualification for the championship group
4	DAC Dunajská Streda	22	8	8	6	32	22	+10	32	Qualification for the championship group
5	Podbrezová	22	7	9	6	31	29	+2	30	Qualification for the championship group
6	Košice	22	7	8	7	31	25	+6	29	Qualification for the championship group

Source: Niké liga (in Slovak)
Rules for classification: 1) Points; 2) Head-to-head points; 3) Head-to-head goal difference; 4) Head-to-head away goals scored; 5) Play-off.

Pos	Team	Pld	W	D	L	GF	GA	GD	Pts	Qualification	SLO	ŽIL	TRN	DAC	KOŠ	POD
1	Slovan Bratislava (C, Q)	32	22	6	4	74	39	+35	72	Qualification for the Champions League second qualifying round (Note: Since already qualified Paris Saint-Germain won the Champions League, Slovan Bratislava was promoted to the Champions League second qualifying round as one of the two champions with the highest coefficient in Champions League qualifying.)	—	4–3	1–1	2–2	1–0	3–1
2	Žilina (Q)	32	15	9	8	55	40	+15	54	Qualification for the Conference League second qualifying round	0–5	—	2–1	0–1	0–0	0–0
3	Spartak Trnava (Q)	32	14	10	8	46	34	+12	52	Qualification for the Europa League first qualifying round	2–3	2–4	—	1–1	0–1	2–1
4	DAC Dunajská Streda (O)	32	13	12	7	48	34	+14	51	Qualification for the Conference League play-offs	2–1	3–1	1–0	—	3–2	1–1
5	Košice	32	11	11	10	45	38	+7	44	Qualification for the Conference League play-offs	2–3	3–2	2–1	2–2	—	1–1
6	Železiarne Podbrezová	32	8	13	11	40	43	−3	37	Qualification for the Conference League play-offs	1–3	1–1	1–2	2–0	0–1	—

Source: Niké liga (in Slovak)
Legend: Blue = home team win; Yellow = draw; Red = away team win.
Rules for classification: 1) Points; 2) Head-to-head points; 3) Head-to-head goal difference; 4) Head-to-head away goals scored; 5) Play-off.
(C) Champions; (O) Play-off winners; (Q) Qualified for the phase indicated
Notes:

Pos	Team	Pld	W	D	L	GF	GA	GD	Pts	Qualification or relegation	ZMI	KOM	SKA	RUŽ	TRE	DUK
1	Zemplín Michalovce	32	10	10	12	48	56	−8	40	Qualification for the Conference League play-offs	—	4–5	2–4	2–1	3–2	3–3
2	Komárno	32	11	6	15	36	48	−12	39		0–1	—	1–1	1–2	0–0	2–1
3	Skalica	32	10	8	14	36	45	−9	38		1–0	0–1	—	1–0	1–0	3–1
4	Ružomberok	32	10	6	16	35	50	−15	36		1–0	0–1	3–2	—	1–0	1–2
5	Trenčín (O)	32	7	14	11	37	48	−11	35	Qualification for the relegation play-offs	3–2	1–0	2–0	2–2	—	2–2
6	Dukla Banská Bystrica (R)	32	5	7	20	35	60	−25	22	Relegation to the 2. Liga	2–3	0–1	0–2	0–2	2–3	—

Source: Niké liga (in Slovak)
Legend: Blue = home team win; Yellow = draw; Red = away team win.
Rules for classification: 1) Points; 2) Head-to-head points; 3) Head-to-head goal difference; 4) Head-to-head away goals scored; 5) Play-off.
(O) Play-off winners; (R) Relegated

==== Results summary ====
Overall								Home						Away					
Pld	W	D	L	GF	GA	GD	Pts	W	D	L	GF	GA	GD	W	D	L	GF	GA	GD
18	10	6	2	27	14	+13	36	5	3	1	12	6	+6	5	3	1	15	8	+7

Last updated: 14 December 2024.
Source: soccerway

==== Results by round ====
Round	1	2	3	4	5	6	7	8	9	10	11	12	13	14	15	16	17	18	19
Ground	H	A	H	H	A	H	A	H	A	A	H	A	H	A	A	H	A	H	A
Result	D	D	W	D	W	D	D	W	D	W	L	W	W	W	L	W	W	W	
Position	8	8	4	6	4	4	5	4	4	3	4	3	3	3	3	3	3	3	

Updated to match(es) played on 14 December 2024. Source: worldfootball
A = Away; H = Home; W = Win; D = Draw; L = Loss

==== Matches ====
28 July 2024 1	Spartak Trnava	0–0	Trenčín	Trnava
18:00 UTC+2	Zeljković (yellow card) 34'; Mikovič (yellow card) 61'		Bondarenko (yellow card) 50'; Stojsavljević (yellow card) 71'	Stadium: Anton Malatinský Stadium; Referee: Michal Smolak

4 August 2024 2	Zemplín Michalovce	0–0	Spartak Trnava	Michalovce
18:00 UTC+2	Adekunle (yellow card) 54'; Taraduda (yellow card) 79'	Report	Zeljković (yellow card) 51'; Holík (yellow card) 61'; Kóša (yellow card) 66'; Procházka (yellow card) 77'	Stadium: Mestský futbalový štadión Attendance: 2,485; Referee: (Slovakia) Matej Choreň

18 August 2024 4	Spartak Trnava	0–0	Žilina	Trnava
18:00 CET	Kratochvíl (yellow card) 89'	Report	Kopásek (yellow card) 35'; Sauer (yellow card) 44'; Ndjeungoue (yellow card) 68'; Minárik (yellow card) 90+4'	Stadium: Anton Malatinský Stadium; Attendance: 3,919; Referee: (Slovakia) Filip Glova

24 August 2024 5	Skalica	1–2	Spartak Trnava	Skalica
18:00 CET	Černek (yellow card) 51'; Podhorín (yellow card) 78'; Leginus 90+2'; Junas (yellow card) 90+11'	Report	Kratochvíl (yellow card) 55'; Daniel 59' 81'; Sabo (yellow card) 72'	Stadium: Mestský štadión Skalica; Attendance: 2,515; Referee: (Slovakia) Peter Ziemba

1 September 2024 6	Spartak Trnava	2–2	Ružomberok	Trnava
18:00 CET	Kratochvíl 9'; Mikovič 22'; Ďuriš (yellow card) 61'	Report	Hladík 44' (yellow card) 71'; Chrien 62' (pen.); Domonkos (yellow card) 83'	Stadium: Anton Malatinský Stadium; Attendance: 3,666; Referee: (Slovakia) Erik Gemzický

15 September 2024 7	FC Košice	1–1	Spartak Trnava	Košice
18:00 CET	Gallovič 43' (yellow card) 52'; Jakubko (yellow card) 51'	Report	Štetina 5'; Procházka (yellow card) 45+1'; Jureškin (yellow card) 53'; Kratochvíl (yellow card) 67'	Stadium: Košická futbalová aréna Attendance: 5,252; Referee: (Slovakia) Marián Ruc

22 September 2024 8	Spartak Trnava	1–0	Dukla Banská Bystrica	Trnava
15:30 CET	Ďuriš (yellow card) 17' (goal) 36'	Report	Šikula (yellow card) 19'; Rymarenko (yellow card) 37'; Ľupták (yellow card) 82'; Hanes (yellow card) 90+4'	Stadium: Anton Malatinský Stadium; Attendance: 3,518; Referee: (Slovakia) Peter Ziemba

28 September 2024 9	DAC 1904	0–0	Spartak Trnava	Dunajská Streda
20:30 CET	Redzic (yellow card) 33'	Report	Pich (yellow card) 23'; Kratochvíl (yellow card) 52'; Procházka (yellow card) 90+1'; Kubista (yellow card) 90+4'	Stadium: MOL Aréna; Attendance: 5,327; Referee: (Slovakia) Ivan Kružliak

5 October 2024 10	Podbrezová	0–4	Spartak Trnava	Podbrezová
18:00 CET	Paraj (yellow card) 22'	Report	Ofori 45+1' 55'; Ďuriš (yellow card) 50'; Sabo (yellow card) 61'; Daniel 66'; Šulek (yellow card) 67'; Pich 90+5'	Stadium: ZELPO Aréna; Attendance: 1,267; Referee: (Slovakia) Ivan Kružliak

19 October 2024 11	Spartak Trnava	0–1	Slovan Bratislava	Trnava
18:00 CET	Procházka (yellow card) 3'; Kratochvíl (yellow card) 70'; Ďuriš (yellow card) 90'	Report	Barseghyan 68' (yellow card) 69'; Takáč (yellow card) 85'; Tolić (yellow card) 90'	Stadium: Anton Malatinský Stadium; Attendance: 13,583; Referee: (Slovakia) Erik Gemzický

27 October 2024 12	Trenčín	2–3	Spartak Trnava	Trenčín
15:30 CET	Stojsavljević 12' (yellow card) 47'; Tadeáš Hájovský (yellow card) 58'; Uchegbu 67'	Report	Stojsavljević 45+3' (o.g.); Ujlaky (yellow card) 68'; Daniel 82'; Ofori 88'	Stadium: Štadión Sihoť; Attendance: 3,053; Referee: (Slovakia) Boris Marhefka

30 October 2024 3	Spartak Trnava	3–2	Komárno	Trnava
18:00 CET	Procházka 4' (yellow card) 79'; Ofori 81'; Ďuriš 84'; Šulek (yellow card) 89'	Report	Sylvestr 20' (yellow card) 61'; Christian Bayemi 36'; Ganbold (yellow card) 52'; Tobiáš Diviš (yellow card) 83'	Stadium: Anton Malatinský Stadium; Attendance: 3,045; Referee: (Slovakia) Erik Gemzický

2 November 2024 13	Spartak Trnava	3–1	Zemplín Michalovce	Trnava
15:30 CET	Zeljković (yellow card) 35'; Ofori 65' 88'; Azango 73'	Report	Kyziridis 11'; Taraduda (yellow card) 36'; Shimamura (yellow card) 43'; Arevalo (yellow card) 72'; Bednár (yellow card) 78'	Stadium: Anton Malatinský Stadium; Attendance: 3,379; Referee: (Slovakia) Michal Smolak

9 November 2024 14	Komárno	1–2	Spartak Trnava	Zlaté Moravce
18:00 CET	Nagy (yellow card) 10'; Ganbold (yellow card) 24' (goal) 48'; Gábor Tóth (yellow card) 90+7'	Report	Ďuriš (yellow card) 7'; Zeljković (yellow card) 38'; Procházka 59' (pen.); Ujlaky (yellow card) 90+8'; Kratochvíl 90+9'	Stadium: ViOn Aréna; Attendance: 1,750; Referee: (Slovakia) Kristián Micheľ

23 November 2024 15	Žilina	3–1	Spartak Trnava	Žilina
18:00 CET	Ujlaky 7' (o.g.); Kaprálik 15'; Sauer 33'; Hubočan (yellow card) 41'; Ndjeungoue (yellow card) 52'; Kopásek (yellow card) 90+1'	Report	Paur 12'; Mikovič (yellow card) 64'; Zeljković (yellow card) 83'	Stadium: Štadión pod Dubňom; Attendance: 2,681; Referee: (Slovakia) Michal Smolak

30 November 2024 16	Spartak Trnava	2–0	Skalica	Trnava
15:30 CET	Štetina (yellow card) 8'; Procházka (yellow card) 16'; Ofori 24'; Azango 37'	Report	Yao (yellow card) 3'; Morong (yellow card) 74'; Podhorín (yellow card) 85'	Stadium: Anton Malatinský Stadium; Attendance: 2,339; Referee: (Slovakia) Marián Ruc

7 December 2024 17	Ružomberok	0–2	Spartak Trnava	Ružomberok
15:30 CET	Tučný (yellow card) 72'	Report	Azango (yellow card) 19' (goal) 32'; Ďuriš 90+5'	Stadium: Štadión pod Čebraťom; Attendance: 1,033; Referee: (Slovakia) Igor Valent

14 December 2024 18	Spartak Trnava	1–0	FC Košice	Trnava
15:30 CET	Štetina (yellow card) 20'; Zeljković (yellow card) 53'; Kratochvíl 59'	Report	Faško (yellow card) 45+2'	Stadium: Anton Malatinský Stadium; Attendance: 2,637; Referee: (Slovakia) Martin Dohál

8 February 2025 19	Dukla Banská Bystrica	1–4	Spartak Trnava	Banská Bystrica
15:30 CET	Martin Rymarenko 65’	Report	Michal Ďuriš 8’; Kelvin Ofori 18’; Michal Ďuriš 37’; Boris Godál (OG) 54’	Stadium: Národný Atletický Štadión; Attendance: 1,582

20	Spartak Trnava	1-1	DAC	Trnava
	Jakub Paur 73’	Report	Bartol Barišić 89’	Stadium: Anton Malatinský Stadium; Attendance: 4,302

21	Spartak Trnava	1-1	Podbrezová	Trnava
	Philip Azango 88’	Report	Lionel Abate Etoundi 79’	Stadium: Anton Malatinský Stadium; Attendance: 2,649

22	Slovan Bratislava	0:1	Spartak Trnava	Bratislava
		Report	Philip Azango 12’	Stadium: Tehelné Pole; Attendance: 12,894

23	Spartak Trnava	1-1	DAC	Trnava
	Roman Procházka 47’	Report	Ammar Ramadan 34’	Stadium: Anton Malatinský Stadium; Attendance: 5,704

24	ŠK Slovan Bratislava	1-1	FC Spartak Trnava	Bratislava
	Kenan Bajrić 90’	Report	Adrian Zeljković 45’	Stadium: Tehelné Pole; Attendance: 11,644

25	Spartak	2-4	Žilina	Trnava
	Azango (34“); Ofori (42“)	Report	Dávid Ďuriš (22“); Jambor (pen) (30“); Dávid Ďuriš (58“); Sanusi (71“)	Stadium: Anton Malatinský Stadium; Attendance: 5,137

26	Košice	2:1	Spartak	Košice
	Faško (pen) (29“); Miljanić (68“)	Report	Sabo (90“)	Stadium: Košická futbalová aréna Attendance: 3015

27	Podbrezova	1:2	Spartak	Podbrezová
	Daniel Smékal (9“)	Report	Pich (31“); Paur (58“)	Stadium: ZELPO Aréna; Attendance: 812

28	Spartak	2:3	Slovan	Trnava
	Kratochvíl (8“); Jureškin (65“)	Report	Tolić (pen) (31“); Ibrahim (45“); Strelec (60“)	Stadium: Anton Malatinský Stadium; Attendance: 7,537

29	MŠK Žilina	2:1	Spartak	Žilina
	Xavier Adang (48”); Xavier Adang (71”)	Report	Roman Procházka (pen) (26”)	Stadium: Štadión pod Dubňom; Attendance: 1,876

30	Spartak	0:1	Košice	Trnava
		Report	Niarchos (37“); Niarchos (RC) (90”)	Stadium: Anton Malatinský Stadium; Attendance: 3,073

31	DAC	1:0	Spartak Trnava	Dunajská Streda
	Alioune Sylla (19“)	Report	Adrian Zeljković (RC) (31”)	Stadium: MOL Aréna; Attendance: 6,042

32	Spartak Trnava	2:1	Podbrezova	Trnava
	Sabo (pen) (51“); Kratochvíl (76“)	Report	Peter Juritka (19“)	Stadium: Anton Malatinský Stadium; Attendance: 4,731

=== Slovak Cup ===
11 September 2024 Second round	Blava Jaslovské Bohunice	0–2	Spartak Trnava	Jaslovské Bohunice
16:30 CET		Report	Ďuriš 58'; Procházka 85'	Stadium: Štadión Jaslovské Bohunice

2 October 2024 Third round	Častkovce	1–7	Spartak Trnava	Častkovce
15:30 CET	Róbert Ambrož 70'	Report	Pich 1' 26' 84'; Paur 24' 34' 41'; Ofori 32'	Stadium: Stadium OK Častkovce

16 October 2024 Fourth round	MFK Bytča	1–4	Spartak Trnava	Bytča
15:00 CET	Matej Pavlík 43'	Report	Ďuriš 4'; Pich 37'; Filip Trello 75'; Corryn 77'	Stadium: Mestský štadión Bytča; Attendance: 1,920; Referee: (Slovakia) Pavel Ochotnický

14 November 2024 Round of 16	Spartak Trnava	1–1 (3–2 p)	Podbrezová	Trnava
18:00 CET	Mikovič (yellow card) 72'; Šulek (yellow card) 77'; Procházka (yellow card) 77'; Azango 86'	Report	Paraj (yellow card) 25'; Slávik (yellow card) 29'; Štefánik (yellow card) 45'; Alex Marković 90+3'	Stadium: City Arena – Anton Malatinský Stadium; Attendance: 2,327; Referee: (Slovakia) Ivan Kružliak

12 March 2025 Quarter-finals	Žilina	0–2	Spartak Trnava	Žilina
14:30 CET		Report	Ďuriš 17’; Ďuriš 34’	Stadium: Štadión pod Dubňom

2 April 2025 Semi-final first leg	Slovan Bratislava	2–1	Spartak Trnava	Tehelné pole, Bratislava
18:00 CEST (UTC+2)	Mak 31'; Vojtko 41'	Report	Ofori 12'	Attendance: 7,816; Referee: Michal Očenáš

15 April 2025 Semi-final second leg	Spartak Trnava	2–1 (a.e.t.) (3–3 agg.) (4–2 p)	Slovan Bratislava	Anton Malatinský Stadium, Trnava
18:00 CEST (UTC+2)	Mikovič 35’; Ďuriš 90'	Report	Kashia 39'	Attendance: 10,132; Referee: Boris Marhefka
	Penalties
	Jureškin (penalty scored); Procházka (penalty scored); Zeljković (penalty scored); Badolo (penalty missed); Sabo (penalty scored)		(penalty scored) Tolić; (penalty missed) Barseghyan; (penalty scored) Ihnatenko; (penalty missed) Mak

1 May 2025 Final	Ružomberok	0–1	Spartak Trnava	Dunajská Streda
15:00 (UTC+2)		Report	Daniel 31'	Stadium: DAC Aréna; Attendance: 9,437; Referee: Michal Smolák

=== UEFA Conference League ===
==== Second qualifying round ====
The draw was held on 19 June 2024.

25 July 2024 First leg	Sarajevo (Bosnia and Herzegovina)	0–0	(Slovakia) Spartak Trnava	Sarajevo, Bosnia and Herzegovina
21:00	Bubanja (yellow card) 24'; Soldo (yellow card) 41'; Mehmedović (yellow card) 90+4'	Report	Procházka (yellow card) 43'	Stadium: Koševo City Stadium; Attendance: 26,756; Referee: Bram Van Driessche (Belgium)

31 July 2024 Second leg	Spartak Trnava (Slovakia)	3–0 (3–0 agg.)	(Bosnia and Herzegovina) Sarajevo	Trnava
20:30		Report		Stadium: Anton Malatinský Stadium

==== Third qualifying round ====
8 August 2024 First leg	Spartak Trnava (Slovakia)	3–1	(Poland) Wisła Kraków	Trnava, Slovakia
20:30 CET	Bainović (yellow card) 14'; Ďuriš 47' 68'; Azango 60'	Report	Ángel Rodado 26'; Sukiennicki (yellow card) 42'	Stadium: Anton Malatinský Stadium; Attendance: 13,010; Referee: (Kazakhstan) Sayat Karabayev

15 August 2024 Second leg	Wisła Kraków (Poland)	3–1 (a.e.t.) (4–4 agg.) (12–11 p)	(Slovakia) Spartak Trnava	Kraków, Poland
20:30 CET	Kiakos (yellow card) 5'; Ángel Rodado 43' (pen.); Starzyński 59'; Jaroch (yellow card) 69'; Uryga 98'	Report	Sabo (yellow card) 1'; Ďuriš (yellow card) 45+1' (goal) 106'; Kubista (yellow card) 90+5'; Paur (yellow card) 100'; Frelih (yellow card) 120'	Stadium: Henryk Reyman Stadium; Attendance: 15,099; Referee: (Scotland) Don Robertson
