= 2008 Slovak Cup final =

- Event: 2007–08 Slovak Cup
Artmedia Petržalka	Spartak Trnava
1	0
- Date: 1 May 2008
- Venue: Štadión pod Dubňom, Žilina
- Referee: Ľuboš Micheľ
- Attendance: 5,000

The 2008 Slovak Cup final was the final match of the 2007–08 Slovak Cup, the 39th season of the top cup competition in Slovak football. The match was played at the Štadión pod Dubňom in Žilina on 1 May 2008 between FC Artmedia Petržalka and FC Spartak Trnava. Artmedia defeated Spartak Trnava 1-0.

== Route to the final ==
FC Artmedia Petržalka		Round	FC Spartak Trnava
Opponent	Result	2007–08 Slovak Cup	Opponent	Result
Bye		Second Round	ŠK SFM Senec	2-0
FK DAC 1904 Dunajská Streda	0-0 (4:2 pen.)	Third Round	1. HFC Humenné	1-0
FK Inter Bratislava	4–0, 2-1 home	Quarter-finals	1. FC Tatran Prešov	1-0 away, 0-0 home
MŠK Žilina	1–0 away, 1-0 home	Semi-finals	MFK Košice	0–0 away, 3-1 home

== Match ==
=== Details ===
1 May 2008
17:00 CEST

Artmedia Petržalka	1–0	Spartak Trnava
Pospěch 90+1'	Report

Štadión pod Dubňom, Žilina
Attendance: 5,000
Referee: Ľuboš Micheľ

Artmedia Petržalka	Spartak Trnava

ARTMEDIA PETRŽALKA:
GK	18	(Slovakia) Ľuboš Kamenár
RB	19	(Slovakia) Marián Čišovský		(yellow card) 90'
CB	17	(Slovakia) Kornel Saláta (c)
CB	6	(Czech Republic) Radek Dosoudil		(yellow card) 86'
LB	24	(Slovakia) Peter Burák
RM	12	(Slovakia) Branislav Obžera		(substituted off) 55'
CM	16	(Slovakia) Juraj Czinege	(yellow card) 23'	(substituted off) 68'
CM	25	(Slovakia) Ján Kozák
AM	20	(Slovakia) Branislav Fodrek
CF	13	(Slovakia) Juraj Piroska		(substituted off) 90+'
FW	9	(Slovakia) Juraj Halenár
Substitutions:
LW	11	(Brazil) Cléber	(substituted in) 68'	(yellow card) 82'
ST	22	(Czech Republic) Zbyněk Pospěch		(substituted in) 55'
ST	14	(Slovakia) Tomáš Oravec		(substituted in) 90+'
Manager:
Vladimír Weiss

SPARTAK TRNAVA:
GK	22	(Slovakia) Ladislav Rybánsky
RB	7	(Slovakia) Vladimír Pončák
CB	4	(Slovakia) Tomáš Hanzel
CB	3	(Slovakia) Peter Doležaj
LB	12	(Slovakia) Peter Jakubička
DM	14	(Slovakia) Kamil Kopúnek	(yellow card) 9'
CM	8	(Slovakia) Peter Ďuriš	(substituted off) 90+'
RM	10	(Slovakia) Miroslav Barčík	(yellow card) 65'
LM	17	(Czech Republic) Martin Hruška	(substituted off) 74'
LM	15	(Slovakia) Ľubomír Bernáth
FW	9	(Slovakia) Vladimír Kožuch	(substituted off) 62'
Substitutions:
MF	21	(Czech Republic) Lukáš Vaculík	(substituted in) 74'
FW	11	(Slovakia) Marián Tomčák	(substituted in) 90+'
FW	19	(Serbia) Borivoje Filipović	(substituted in) 62'
Manager:
Josef Mazura

Assistant referees:
(Slovakia) Roman Slyško
(Slovakia) Martin Balko
