= Martin Mikovič =

Slovak footballer

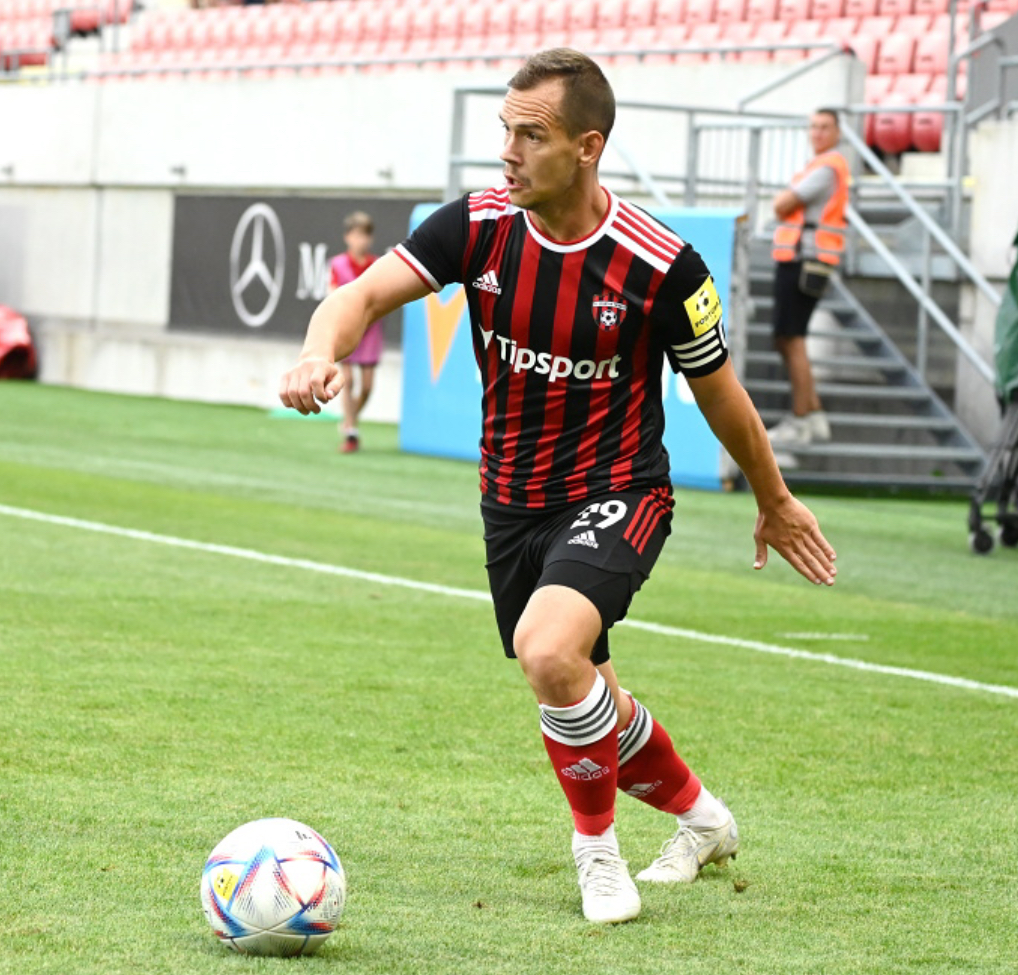

Personal information
- Date of birth: 12 September 1990 (age 36)
- Place of birth: Trnava, Czechoslovakia
- Height: 1.67 m (5 ft 6 in)
- Positions: Left-back; winger

Team information
- Current team: Spartak Trnava
- Number: 29

Youth career
- 1997–2010: Spartak Trnava

Senior career*
Years	Team	Apps	(Gls)
2010–2016	Spartak Trnava	155	(26)
2017–2020	Bruk-Bet Termalica	88	(5)
2020–	Spartak Trnava	137	(7)

International career
2012	Slovakia U21	5	(0)
- * Club domestic league appearances and goals as of 21 November 2026

Martin Mikovič (born 12 September 1990) is a Slovak professional footballer who plays for Spartak Trnava as a left back or winger.

He has played over 300 games for Spartak in all competitions.

== Club career ==
=== Spartak Trnava ===
Mikovič is a product of the Spartak Trnava youth academy. In 2010, he was included in the first team squad. On 10 April 2010, he made his debut in the Corgoň Liga in a match against FK Senica (1–2), playing in the starting line-up.

In the 2009–10 season, he reached the final of the Slovak Cup with his club, where they lost 6–0 to Slovan Bratislava.

In the summer of 2012, he made his first appearance in European cups, when he played in a match against Sligo Rovers (3–1) in the 2012–13 UEFA Europa League qualifiers, in which he scored two goals.

In February 2016, Mikovič was appointed team captain, a position he held for a year, until he expressed his desire to change clubs. In total, he played 155 league matches for Spartak Trnava, scoring 26 goals.

=== Bruk-Bet Termalica Nieciecza ===
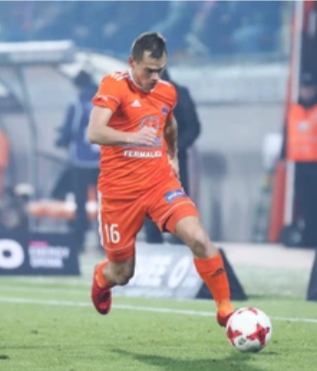
Mikovič with Bruk-Bet Termalica Nieciecza

In February 2017, Mikovič signed a 3-year contract with Polish side Bruk-Bet Termalica Nieciecza, managed by Czesław Michniewicz. On 11 March 2017, he made his debut in the Ekstraklasa in a 1–0 defeat to Wisła Płock, appearing on the pitch in the 80th minute replacing Guilherme. On 4 June, he scored his first goal for Bruk-Bet Termalica, in the 93rd minute of a 2–1 win over Wisła Kraków.

=== Return to Spartak Trnava ===
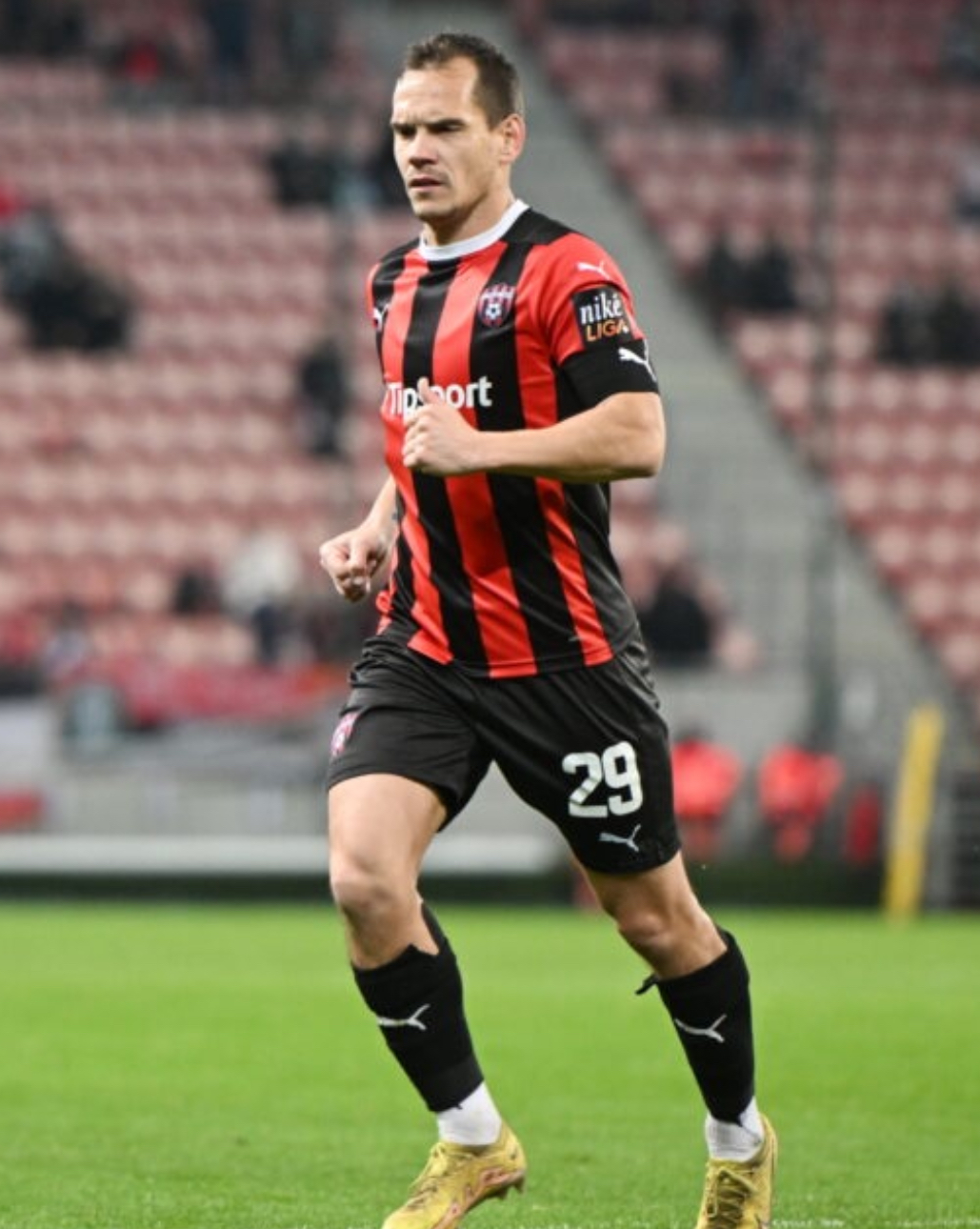
Mikovič in 2024

In the summer of 2020, it was announced that Mikovič would be returning to Spartak Trnava after three years in Poland. On 15 April 2025, he scored a goal against Slovan Bratislava in the semi-final of the Slovak Cup, the game would eventually go to penalties, which Spartak won 4–2.

On 22 May 2025, Mikovič signed a one-year extension to his contract alongside teammates Michal Ďuriš, Jakub Paur, and Roman Procházka.

He played the full 90 minutes in a 1–0 home defeat to BK Häcken in the 1st round of qualification to the Europa League.

== International career ==
In 2012, Mikovič was called up to the Slovakia national under-21 football team, where he made 5 appearances and provided 1 assist.

== Honors ==
Spartak Trnava

- Slovak Cup: 2021–22, 2022–23, 2024–25
