= Yevhen Selin =

Ukrainian footballer

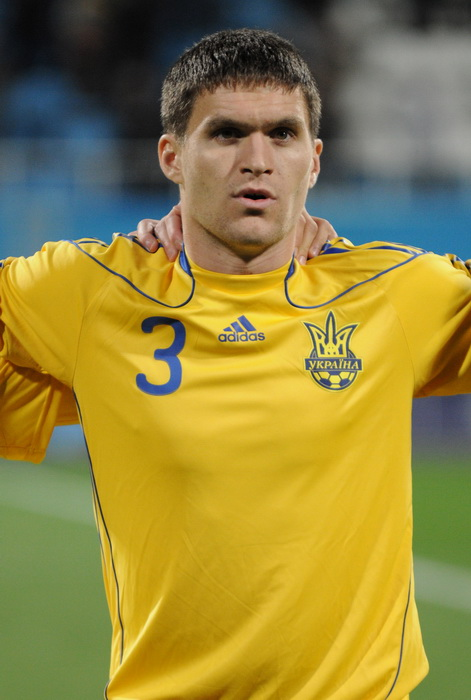
- Selin in 2010

Personal information
- Full name: Yevhen Serhiyovych Selin
- Date of birth: 9 May 1988 (age 38)
- Place of birth: Novoaidar, Soviet Union (now Ukraine)
- Height: 1.90 m (6 ft 3 in)
- Positions: Left back; centre back

Team information
- Current team: Avanhard Lozova
- Number: 33

Youth career
- 2001–2005: Stal Alchevsk

Senior career*
Years	Team	Apps	(Gls)
2006	Stal Alchevsk	0	(0)
2007–2010	Metalist Kharkiv	8	(0)
2010	→ Vorskla Poltava (loan)	29	(2)
2011–2013	Vorskla Poltava	45	(4)
2013–2017	Dynamo Kyiv	18	(0)
2015	→ Metalist Kharkiv (loan)	11	(0)
2015–2016	→ Platanias (loan)	27	(1)
2016–2018	Asteras Tripolis	29	(0)
2018–2019	MTK Budapest	27	(1)
2019–2021	Anorthosis Famagusta	31	(2)
2021–2022	Desna Chernihiv	15	(0)
2022–2023	Chornomorets Odesa	9	(1)
2023	LNZ Cherkasy	6	(0)
2024–2025	UCSA Tarasivka	22	(1)
2025–	Avanhard Lozova	10	(0)

International career^{‡}
2008–2011	Ukraine U21	14	(0)
2011–2016	Ukraine	16	(1)
- * Club domestic league appearances and goals as of 22 November 2026 ‡ National team caps and goals as of 22 December 2024

Yevhen Serhiyovych Selin (Ukrainian: Євген Сергійович Селін; born 9 May 1988) is a Ukrainian professional footballer who plays as a left back or centre back for Avanhard Lozova.

== Club career ==
Selin was born in Voroshylovhrad Oblast, Ukrainian SSR.

=== Metalist Kharkiv ===
He signed for Metalist Kharkin in 2007, where he played for the reserves before making his way into the senior side during the 2008–09 season.

=== Vorskla Poltava ===
On 10 June 2010, he left Metalist and joined Ukrainian Premier League rivals Vorskla Poltava on loan without a signing option.

=== Asteras Tripolis ===
On 20 December 2016, Asteras Tripolis officially announced the signing of Selin from FC Dynamo Kyiv until the summer of 2018. He had a successful loan spell with Platanias in the 2015–16 season.

=== MTK Budapest ===
In summer 2018 he moved to MTK Budapest in Nemzeti Bajnokság I, where he played 24 games and scored 1 goal.

=== Desna Chernihiv ===
On 15 July 2021 he signed a contract for one year with Desna Chernihiv in the Ukrainian Premier League. On 25 July, he debuted for his new club against Chornomorets Odesa. On 21 September he played against Metalist Kharkiv in the 2021–22 Ukrainian Cup. On 7 November 2021, he scored as an 80th-minute substitute against Lviv.

=== Chornomorets Odesa ===
On 21 June 2022 he signed a 2-year contract with Chornomorets Odesa.

=== Avanhard Lozova ===
In summer 2025 he moved to Avanhard Lozova.

== International career ==
Selin was called up to the Ukraine under-21 national team in 2008. On 7 October 2011 he made his senior debut for Ukraine and netted a goal in a 3–0 home win against Bulgaria in a friendly. He was included in the Ukraine squad for Euro 2012 and played every minute of their three group matches.

== Outside of professional football ==
In March 2022, during the Siege of Chernihiv, together with other former Desna players he helped raise money for the civilian population of the city of Chernihiv.

== Career statistics ==
=== Club ===
As of match played 22 November 2026

Appearances and goals by club, season and competition
Club	Season	League			Cup		Europe		Other		Total	
Club	Season	Division	Apps	Goals	Apps	Goals	Apps	Goals	Apps	Goals	Apps	Goals
Metalist Kharkiv	2008–09	Ukrainian Premier League	2	0	0	0	0	0	0	0	2	0
Metalist Kharkiv	2009–10	Ukrainian Premier League	6	0	0	0	0	0	0	0	6	0
Vorskla Poltava (loan)	2010–11	Ukrainian Premier League	29	2	0	0	0	0	0	0	29	2
Vorskla Poltava	2011–12	Ukrainian Premier League	29	3	0	0	11 (Note: eleven appearances in 2011-12 UEFA Europa League)	0	0	0	40	3
Vorskla Poltava	2012–13	Ukrainian Premier League	16	1	1	0	0	0	0	0	17	1
Dynamo Kyiv	2012–13	Ukrainian Premier League	6	0	0	0	0	0	0	0	6	0
Dynamo Kyiv	2013–14	Ukrainian Premier League	10	0	1	0	0	0	0	0	0	0
Dynamo Kyiv	2014–15	Ukrainian Premier League	2	0	0	0	1	0	0	0	3	0
Metalist Kharkiv (loan)	2014–15	Ukrainian Premier League	11	0	1	0	0	0	0	0	12	0
Platanias (loan)	2015–16	Super League Greece	27	1	3	0	0	0	0	0	30	1
Asteras Tripolis	2016–17	Super League Greece	18	0	3	0	0	0	0	0	21	0
Asteras Tripolis	2017–18	Super League Greece	11	0	3	0	0	0	0	0	14	0
MTK Budapest	2018–19	Nemzeti Bajnokság I	27	1	0	0	1	0	0	0	28	1
Anorthosis Famagusta	2019–20	Cypriot First Division	20	1	4	0	0	0	0	0	24	1
Anorthosis Famagusta	2020–21	Cypriot First Division	11	1	1	0	1 (Note: one appearance in Europa League third qualifying round)	0	0	0	13	1
Desna Chernihiv	2021–22	Ukrainian Premier League	15	0	1	0	0	0	0	0	16	0
Chornomorets Odesa	2022–23	Ukrainian Premier League	9	1	0	0	0	0	0	0	9	1
LNZ Cherkasy	2022–23	Ukrainian Premier League	6	0	0	0	0	0	0	0	6	0
UCSA	2023–24	Ukrainian Second League	5	0	1	0	0	0	0	0	6	0
UCSA	2024–25	Ukrainian First League	16	1	2	0	0	0	0	0	18	1
Avanhard Lozova	2025–26	Ukrainian Amateur League	0	0	1	0	0	0	0	0	0	1
Avanhard Lozova	2026–27	Ukrainian Second League	10	0	1	0	0	0	0	0	11	0
Career total			285	12	23	0	14	0	0	0	312	12

=== International ===
As of match played 21 July 2021

Appearances and goals by national team and year
National team	Year	Apps	Goals
Ukraine
Ukraine	2011	4	1
Ukraine	2012	7	0
Ukraine	2013	0	0
Ukraine	2014	5	0
Total		16	1

Appearances and goals by national team and year
National team	Year	Apps	Goals
Ukraine Under 21
Ukraine Under 21	2009	9	0
Total		9	0

=== International goals ===
Scores and results list Ukraine's goal tally first, score column indicates score after each Selin goal.

List of international goals scored by Yevhen Selin
No.	Date	Venue	Opponent	Score	Result	Competition
1	7 October 2011	Lobanovskyi Dynamo Stadium, Kyiv	Bulgaria	1–0	3–0	Friendly

== Honours ==
Dynamo Kyiv

- Ukrainian Premier League: (1) 2014–15
- Ukrainian Cup: (2) 2013-14, 2014–15
- United Tournament (1): 2013

Anorthosis Famagusta

- Cypriot Cup: 2020–21
- Cypriot First Division: runner-up 2019–20

Avanhard Lozova

- Ukrainian Amateur Cup: 2025–26

== Gallery ==
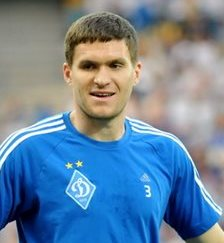
Yevhen Selin in 2013 with Dynamo Kyiv

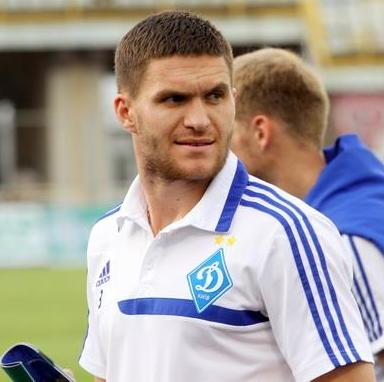
Yevhen Selin in 2014 with Dynamo Kyiv

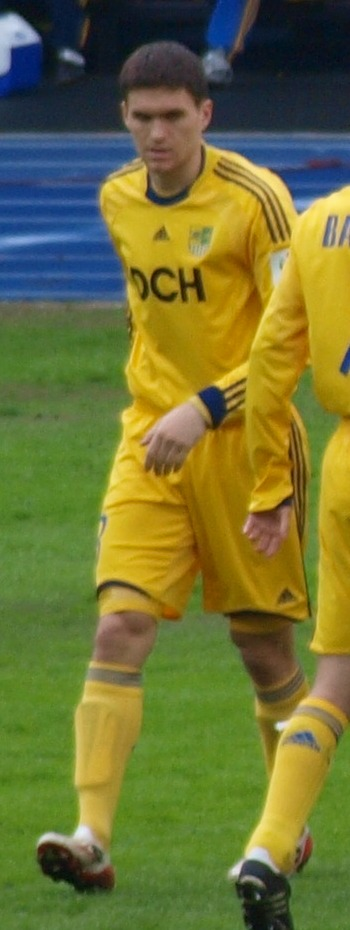
Yevhen Selin in 2010 with Metalist Kharkiv
