= 2019–20 Anorthosis Famagusta FC season =

Anorthosis Famagusta
2019–20 season
- President: Christos Poullaides
- Manager: Temur Ketsbaia
- Stadium: Antonis Papadopoulos
- Cypriot First Division: 2nd (ended due to COVID-19 pandemic in Cyprus)
- Cypriot Cup: Semi-finals (cancelled due to COVID-19 pandemic in Cyprus)
- Top goalscorer: League: Rubén Rayos (14); All: Rubén Rayos (14)

The 2019–20 season was Anorthosis Famagusta's in the Cypriot First Division, the top division of Cyprus football. It covers a period from 1 June 2019 to 30 May 2020.

== Summary ==
=== Pre-season ===
On 20 May 2019, Georgios Galitsios was signed with a contract until 2021.
On 22 May 2019, Andraž Struna and Vincent Bessat released from the club squad.
On 25 May 2019, Danijel Pranjić and Giorgos Economides released from the club squad.
On 26 May 2019, Oliver Buff released from the club squad.
On 28 May 2019, Theodoros Vasilakakis was signed with a contract until 2021.
On 5 June 2019, Yevhen Selin was signed with a contract until 2021.
On 10 June 2019, Ioannis Chadjivasilis was signed with a contract until 2021.
On 12 June 2019, João Víctor released from the club squad, got transferred to Umm Salal SC, with the total profit of Anorthosis Famagusta reaching €100.000.

== Players ==
N	Pos.	Nat.	Name	Age	EU	Since	App	Goals	Ends	Transfer fee	Notes
4	CB	(Cyprus)	Panayiotis Artymatas	26	EU	2017	16	0	2021	€30.000	
5	CB	(Croatia)	Gordon Schildenfeld	40	EU	2017	65	5	2021	Free Transfer	
7	LM	(Cyprus)	Nikos Englezou	31	EU	2018	20	1	2020	Free Transfer	
9	CF	(Georgia (country))	Nika Kacharava	32	EU	2018	24	4	2021	€400.000	EU Nationals (agreement) – one or more years in Cyprus
10	AM	(Spain)	Rubén Rayos	38	EU	2016	88	16	2020	Free Transfer	
18	CF	(Slovenia)	Michal Ďuriš	36	EU	2018	43	22	2022	€600.000	
22	RW	(Cyprus)	Neofytos Kyriakou	27	EU	2014	28	0	2021	Free Transfer	
38	CM	(Cyprus)	Michalis Ioannou	24	EU	2016	18	0	2023	Youth system	
44	CB	(Cyprus)	Konstantinos Sotiriou	28	EU	2018	2	0	2021	Free Transfer	
58	DM	(Cyprus)	Andreas Lemesios	27	EU	2019	0	0	2020	On Loan	On Loan from Nea Salamina Until 31 May 2020
99	GK	(Cyprus)	Demetris Demetriou	26	EU	2015	18	0	2020	Youth system	

- Last updated: 7 June 2019
- Source: Anorthosis Famagusta official website
- Ordered by squad number.

== Transfers ==
=== In ===
No.	Pos.	Nat.	Name	Age	EU	Moving from	Type	Transfer window	Ends	Transfer fee	Source
	RB	(Greece)	Georgios Galitsios	32	EU	(Belgium) Mouscron	Transfer	Summer	2021	Free	Anorthosisfc
	CM	(Greece)	Theodoros Vasilakakis	30	EU	(Greece) Atromitos	Transfer	Summer	2021	Free	Anorthosisfc
33	LB	(Ukraine)	Yevhen Selin	31	EU	(Hungary) MTK Budapest	Transfer	Summer	2021	Free	Anorthosisfc
	RW	(Cyprus)	Ioannis Chadjivasilis	29	EU	(Cyprus) Doxa Katokopias	Transfer	Summer	2021	€1.000	Anorthosisfc
28	CM	(Portugal)	Renato Margaça	33	EU	(Cyprus) Nea Salamis Famagusta	Transfer	Summer	2021	€50.000	Anorthosisfc

▼ Total Spending: €51.000

=== Out ===
N	Pos.	Nat.	Name	Age	EU	Moving to	Type	Transfer window	Transfer fee	Source
6	RB	(Slovenia)	Andraž Struna	31	EU	Free agent	Released	Summer	End of contract	Anorthosisfc
11	LB	(France)	Vincent Bessat	33	EU	(Cyprus) Apollon Limassol	Released	Summer	End of contract	Anorthosisfc
15	CM	(Switzerland)	Oliver Buff	26	EU	Free agent	Released	Summer	Released	Anorthosisfc
19	DM	(Brazil)	Joao Victor	30	EU	(Qatar) Umm Salal SC	Transfer	Summer	€100.000	Anorthosisfc
23	CM	(Cyprus)	Giorgos Economides	29	EU	Free agent	Released	Summer	End of contract	Anorthosisfc
32	LB	(Croatia)	Danijel Pranjić	37	EU	Free agent	Released	Summer	End of contract	Anorthosisfc

▲ Total Income: €100.000

Net Income: ▲€99.000

== Pre-season and friendlies ==
In the Netherlands, and more specifically in Mill, will take place the main stage of Anorthosis Famagusta preparation, from Tuesday, July 16 until Thursday, July 30.

8 July 2019 Pre-Season Friendly	Anorthosis Famagusta (Cyprus)	3 - 3	(Egypt) Zamalek SC	Platres, Cyprus
18:00 UTC+2	Michal Ďuriš 25'; Rubén Rayos 40'; Michalis Christodoulou 60'	Report	77' Youssef Obama; 85' Hamid Ahaddad; 90 (P).' Mohamed Ibrahim	Stadium: Platres Training Center; Attendance: 0 (Gate close training)

12 July 2019 Pre-Season Friendly	Ethnikos Achna (Cyprus)	v	(Cyprus) Anorthosis Famagusta	Dasaki Achnas, Cyprus
18:00 UTC+2				Stadium: Dasaki Stadium

19 July 2019 Pre-Season Friendly	Go Ahead Eagles (Netherlands)	v	(Cyprus) Anorthosis Famagusta	Mill, Netherlands
20:00 UTC+2				Stadium: City Resort Hotel

== Competitions ==
=== Cypriot First Division ===
==== Regular season ====
Pos	Team	Pld	W	D	L	GF	GA	GD	Pts	Qualification or relegation
1	Omonia	22	12	7	3	31	13	+18	43 (Note: Head to head record: Omonia 1–0 Anorthosis, Anorthosis 0–0 Omonia.)	Qualification for the Championship round
2	Anorthosis Famagusta	22	13	4	5	42	21	+21	43	Qualification for the Championship round
3	APOEL	22	11	6	5	35	15	+20	39	Qualification for the Championship round
4	Apollon Limassol	22	12	2	8	38	29	+9	38	Qualification for the Championship round
5	AEK Larnaca	22	9	8	5	36	26	+10	35	Qualification for the Championship round

Source: Cyprus Football Association, Soccerway
Rules for classification: 1) Points; 2) Head-to-head points; 3) Head-to-head goal difference; 4) Head-to-head goals scored; 5) Head-to-head away goals scored (only if two teams); 6) Goal difference; 7) Goals scored; 8) Play-off (only if deciding championship round, relegation round or relegation).

==== Championship round ====
Pos	Team	Pld	W	D	L	GF	GA	GD	Pts	Qualification
1	Omonia (Q)	23	13	7	3	34	13	+21	46 (Note: Head to head record: Omonia 1–0 Anorthosis, Anorthosis 0–0 Omonia.)	Qualification for the Champions League first qualifying round
2	Anorthosis Famagusta (Q)	23	14	4	5	45	21	+24	46	Qualification for the Europa League third qualifying round
3	APOEL (Q)	23	11	7	5	36	16	+20	40	Qualification for the Europa League first qualifying round
4	Apollon Limassol (Q)	23	12	3	8	39	30	+9	39	Qualification for the Europa League first qualifying round
5	AEK Larnaca	23	9	8	6	36	29	+7	35	
6	AEL Limassol	23	8	7	8	27	29	−2	31	

Updated to match(es) played on 8 March 2020. Source: CFA (in Greek)
Rules for classification: 1) Points; 2) Head-to-head points; 3) Head-to-head goal difference; 4) Head-to-head goals scored; 5) Head-to-head away goals scored (only if two teams); 6) Goal difference; 7) Goals scored; 8) Play-off (only if deciding champion or UEFA competitions).
(Q) Qualified for the phase indicated
