= Jakub Paur =

Slovak footballer (born 1992)

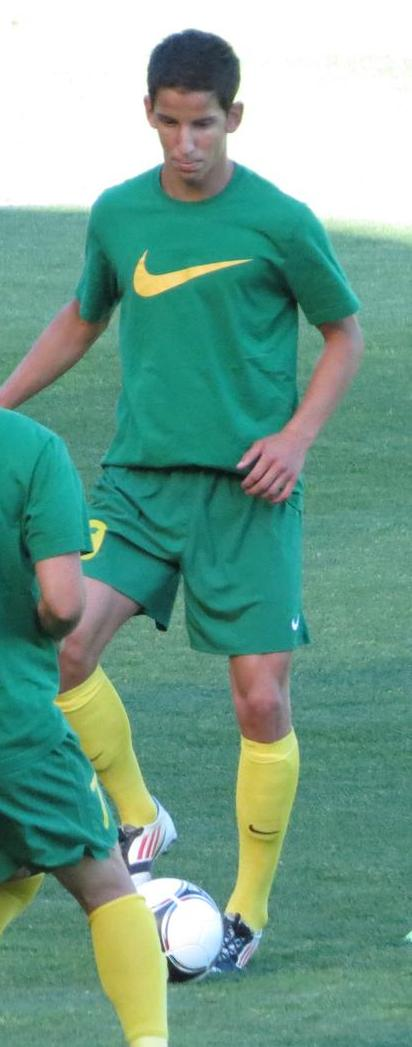

Personal information
- Date of birth: 4 July 1992 (age 34)
- Place of birth: Višňové, Czechoslovakia
- Height: 1.85 m (6 ft 1 in)
- Position: Midfielder

Team information
- Current team: AS Trenčín
- Number: 77

Youth career
- 2005–2011: Žilina

Senior career*
Years	Team	Apps	(Gls)
2011–2016	Žilina	103	(17)
2011–2012	→ ViOn Zlaté Moravce (loan)	25	(1)
2016–2019	AS Trenčín	65	(12)
2019–2022	Žilina	43	(8)
2022–2026	Spartak Trnava	87	(7)
2026–	AS Trenčín	6	(1)

International career
2011	Slovakia U19	2	(0)
2011–2014	Slovakia U21	27	(1)
- * Club domestic league appearances and goals as of 21 September 2026

Jakub Paur (born 4 July 1992) is a Slovak professional footballer who plays for AS Trenčínas a midfielder.

== Club career ==
=== MŠK Žilina ===
Paur grew up in Višňové, near Žilina. He is a product of the MŠK Žilina's academy. He spent his first senior years on a season-long loan at ViOn Zlaté Moravce. Back at Žilina, on 25 July 2013, he scored twice against Slovenian club Olimpija Ljubljana that sealed his side's promotion to the third qualifying round of the 2013–14 UEFA Europa League. In 2015, he was forced to undergo surgery due to a cardiac arrhythmia. In a run through the Europa League qualifiers in 2015, he was the only player to score against all four opponents, Glentoran, Chisinau, Poltava and also the Spanish Bilbao, against whom his goal started a turnaround.

=== Trenčín ===
In August 2016, he left for AS Trenčín, who traded him for Jakub Holúbek. Over three seasons, he played 65 matches for the team in the Slovak First League, scoring 12 goals. In July 2019, he was trialled by Arka Gdynia, but wasn’t offered a contract after failing to pass a medical test. Shortly after, he returned to his parent club MŠK Žilina, where he signed a three-year contract.

=== Spartak Trnava ===
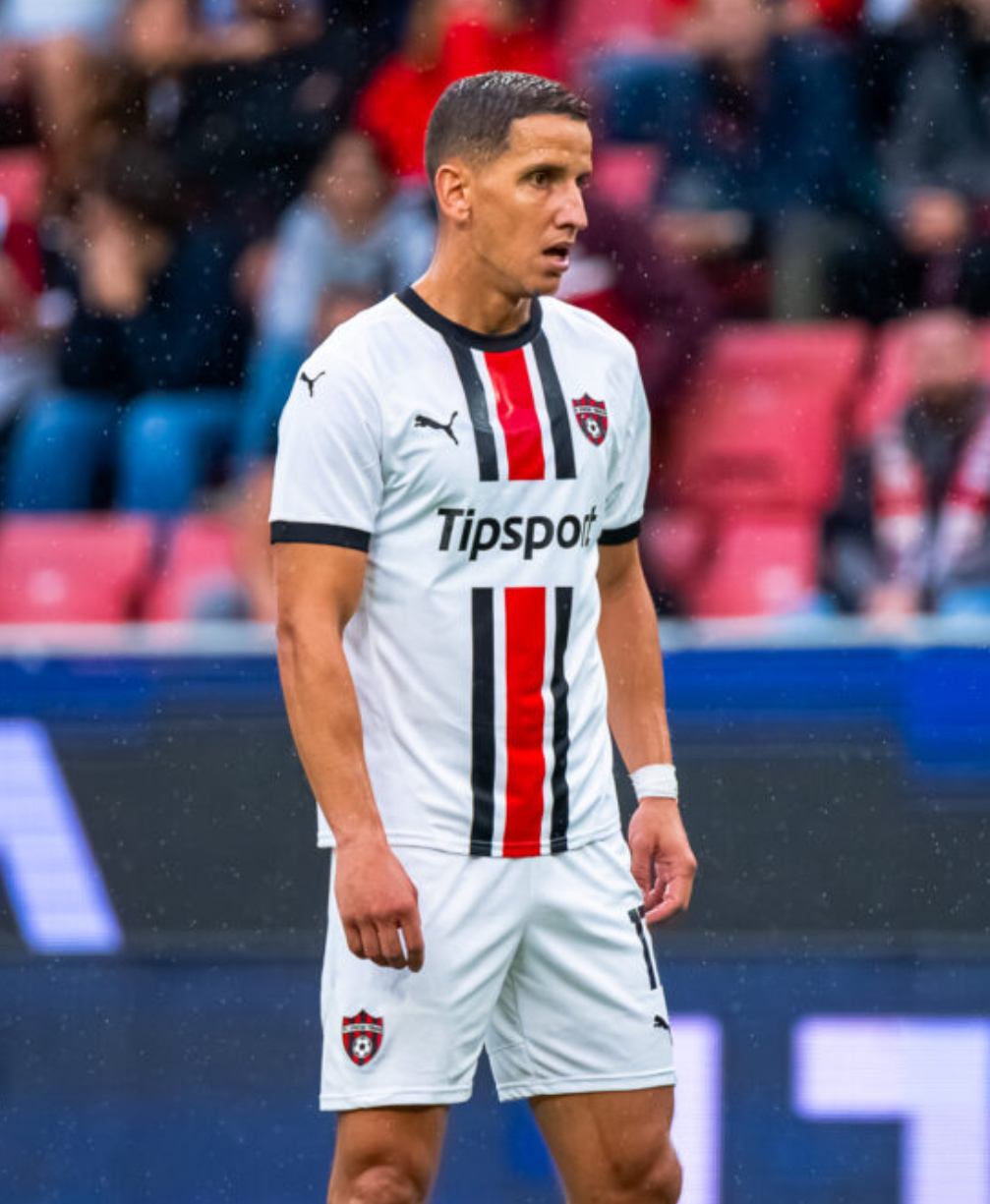
Paur in 2025.

In 2022, it was announced that Paur would be joining fellow league outfit, FC Spartak Trnava. He made his league debut in a 2–1 loss against MFK Dukla Banská Bystrica, being subbed off at half-time. In the final of the 2022–23 Slovak Cup, Paur scored the winning goal in the 110th minute of extra time after coming on off the bench as a substitute. He scored a goal in a 1–1 draw against DAC Dunajska Streda, which would be later voted as the goal of the month. On 22 May 2025, he signed a one-year extension to his contract alongside teammates Michal Ďuriš, Martin Mikovič, and Roman Procházka. On 27 July 2025, Paur scored a brace in a 3–0 league win against MFK Ružomberok.

== International career ==
Paur was first called up to the senior national team for two unofficial friendly fixtures held in Abu Dhabi, UAE, in January 2017, against Uganda (1–3 loss) and Sweden (0–6 loss). Paur did not appear against Uganda, and although it was expected that coach Ján Kozák would field him against Sweden, it was announced before the game that Paur has suffered an unspecified injury. Consequently, Paur was the only of the 23 called up players to not appear in either of the matches.

== Personal life ==
Paur is married to Romana, who gave birth to his first son, Jakub, in August 2021.

== Honours ==
Spartak Trnava

- Slovak Cup: 2022–23, 2024–25
