= Kelvin Ofori =

Ghanaian footballer

Personal information
- Date of birth: 27 July 2001 (age 25)
- Place of birth: Kumasi, Ghana
- Height: 1.72 m (5 ft 8 in)
- Positions: Winger; attacking midfielder

Team information
- Current team: Atromitos
- Number: 97

Youth career
- 2011–2019: Right to Dream Academy

Senior career*
Years	Team	Apps	(Gls)
2019–2021	Fortuna Düsseldorf	12	(0)
2019–2021	Fortuna Düsseldorf II	9	(3)
2021–2022	Paderborn 07	15	(1)
2021	Paderborn 07 II	2	(1)
2023–2025	Spartak Trnava	71	(15)
2025–2026	Slovan Bratislava	14	(3)
2026	→ Olimpija Ljubljana (loan)	12	(1)
2026–	Atromitos	0	(0)
- * Club domestic league appearances and goals as of 23 May 2026

Kelvin Ofori (born 27 July 2001) is a Ghanaian professional footballer who plays as an attacking midfielder for Super League Greece club Atromitos.

== Career ==
=== Early career ===
Ofori first played for the Right to Dream Academy from 2011 to 2019.

=== Fortuna Düsseldorf ===
Following a successful trial at Bundesliga club Fortuna Düsseldorf, Ofori signed a three-year deal with the club.

His first competitive appearance for Fortuna Düsseldorf came as a substitute in a DFB-Pokal match against FC 08 Villingen, in which he scored his first goal at professional level. He also made his Bundesliga debut as a substitute in a match against Mainz 05, replacing Valon Berisha in the 79th minute.

=== SC Paderborn ===
On 11 August 2021, Ofori signed a two-year contract with SC Paderborn 07 of the 2. Bundesliga. Four days later, on 15 August, he made his league debut for the club by coming on as a substitute in a 4–1 win at Werder Bremen. On 24 April 2022, he scored the final goal in a 3–0 win at home to Hannover 96. Eventually, it proved to be his only goal for Paderborn. He made a total of 15 league appearances for the club, mostly as a substitute.

=== Spartak Trnava ===
On 3 February 2023, it was confirmed that Ofori had joined Spartak Trnava of the Slovak First Division, signing a contract for two and a half years. He made his debut for the club on 11 February 2023 by being in the starting line-up for their first league match after the winter break, a 2–1 win at Tatran Liptovský Mikuláš.

== Career statistics ==
As of match played 6 December 2025

Appearances and goals by club, season and competition
Club	Season	League			Cup		Europe		Total	
Club	Season	Division	Apps	Goals	Apps	Goals	Apps	Goals	Apps	Goals
Fortuna Düsseldorf	2019–20	Bundesliga	2	0	3	1	—		5	1
Fortuna Düsseldorf	2020–21	2. Bundesliga	10	0	2	0	—		12	0
Fortuna Düsseldorf	2021–22	2. Bundesliga	0	0	1	0	—		1	0
Fortuna Düsseldorf	Total		12	0	6	1	—		18	1
Fortuna Düsseldorf II	2019–20	Regionalliga West	3	2	—		—		3	2
Fortuna Düsseldorf II	2020–21	Regionalliga West	6	1	—		—		6	1
Fortuna Düsseldorf II	Total		9	3	—		—		9	3
Paderborn 07	2021–22	2. Bundesliga	10	1	—		—		10	1
Paderborn 07	2022–23	2. Bundesliga	5	0	0	0	—		5	0
Paderborn 07	Total		15	1	0	0	—		15	1
Paderborn 07 II	2021–22	Oberliga Westfalen	2	1	—		—		2	1
Spartak Trnava	2022–23	Slovak First Football League	11	2	3	1	0	0	14	3
Spartak Trnava	2023–24	Slovak First Football League	32	4	8	3	12 (Note: Appearances in UEFA Conference League)	3	52	10
Spartak Trnava	2024–25	Slovak First Football League	28	9	7	2	—		35	11
Spartak Trnava	Total		71	15	18	6	12	3	101	24
Slovan Bratislava	2025–26	Slovak First Football League	14	3	2	0	0	0	16	3
Career total			118	23	26	7	12	3	156	33

== Honours ==
Spartak Trnava

- Slovak Cup: 2022–23, 2024–25
