= Erik Daniel =

Czech footballer (born 1992)

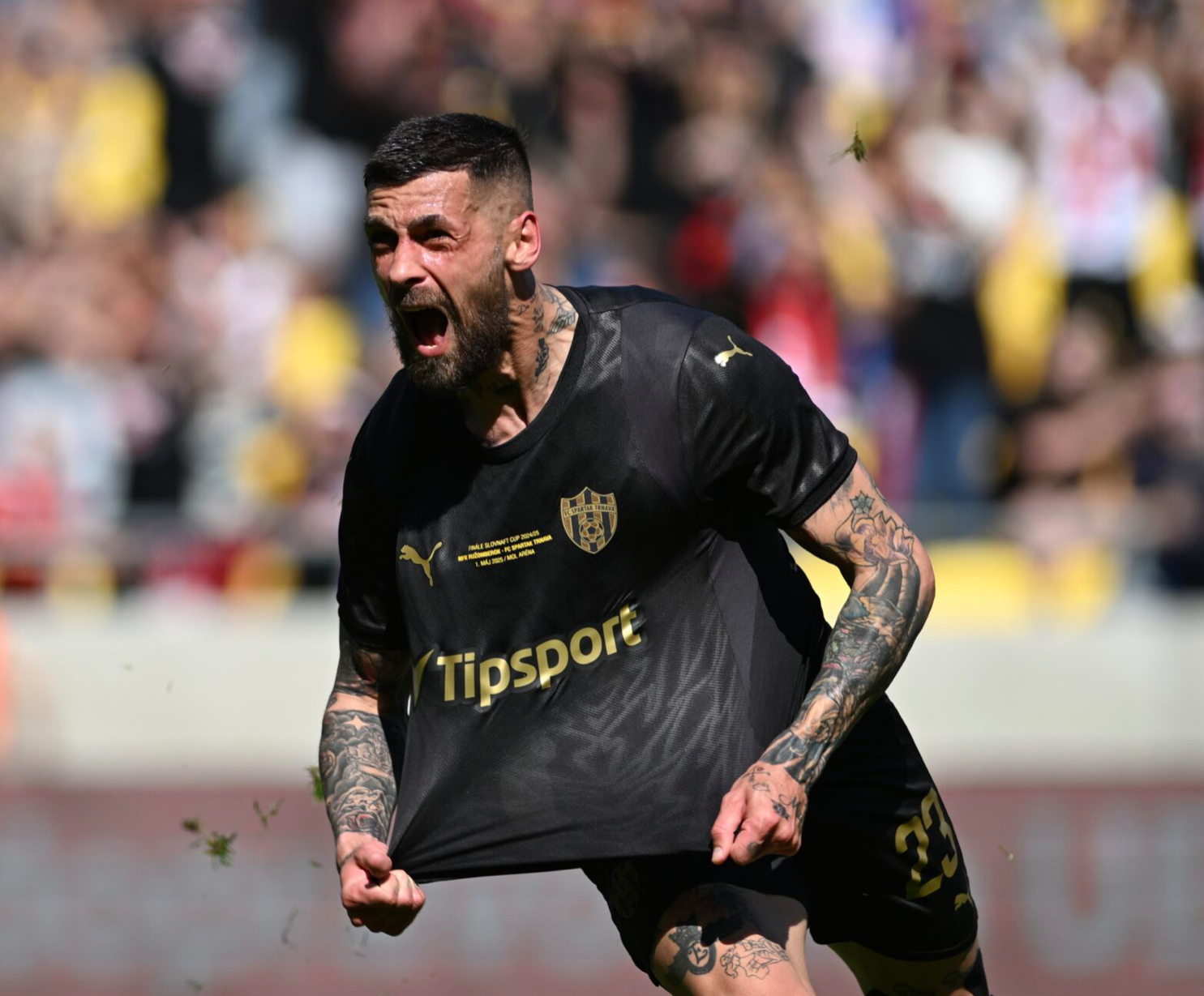
- Daniel, after scoring the winning goal in 2025 Slovak Cup final

Personal information
- Date of birth: 4 February 1992 (age 34)
- Place of birth: Hodonín, Czechoslovakia
- Height: 1.78 m (5 ft 10 in)
- Position: Winger

Team information
- Current team: Skalica
- Number: 77

Youth career
- TJ Iskra Holíč
- FK Šardice
- Spartak Myjava
- Slovan Liberec

Senior career*
Years	Team	Apps	(Gls)
2011–2014	Slovan Liberec	2	(0)
2012–2014	→ Spartak Myjava (loan)	43	(2)
2014–2016	Spartak Myjava	67	(11)
2016–2019	Ružomberok	80	(10)
2019–2022	Slovan Bratislava	52	(5)
2021–2022	→ Zagłębie Lubin (loan)	31	(3)
2022–2025	Spartak Trnava	87	(11)
2025–	Skalica	34	(4)
- * Club domestic league appearances and goals as of 21 September 2026

Erik Daniel (born 4 February 1992) is a Czech professional footballer who plays as a winger for Skalica.

== Club career ==
=== Spartak Myjava ===
In the winter transfer window of the 2012/13 season, Daniel returned to Spartak Myjava, where he went for half a year without the option to buy.

He made his league debut for Myjava in the match of the 20th round played on 2 March 2013 against AS Trenčín. He came on the field in the 77th minute instead of Peter Šulek, but he could not prevent a 0:1 loss on the opponent's field.

=== Ružomberok ===
In July 2016, Daniel transferred to MFK Ružomberok, where he signed a three-year contract. There he met the coaching duo Norbert Hrnčár - Richard Höger, who also coached him in Myjava.

He made his league debut for his new club on 23 July 2016 in a match against MŠK Žilina, coming on the field in the 57th minute instead of Martin Chrien.

On 5 June 2017, Daniel scored a double for Ružomberok in a 2:1 win over FK Senica.

=== Slovan Bratislava ===
In February 2019, on his 27th birthday, he signed a three-year contract with Slovan Bratislava, valid from the 2019/20 season. He also had offers from abroad.

=== Zagłębie Lubin ===
In the summer of 2021, Daniel left Slovan for a one-year loan to the Polish team Zagłębie Lubin. He made his debut for his new team in a 3:0 loss against Wisła Kraków on 26 July 2021, coming on as a substitute in the 62” minute for Karol Podliński. After a year he returned to Slovan.

=== Spartak Trnava ===
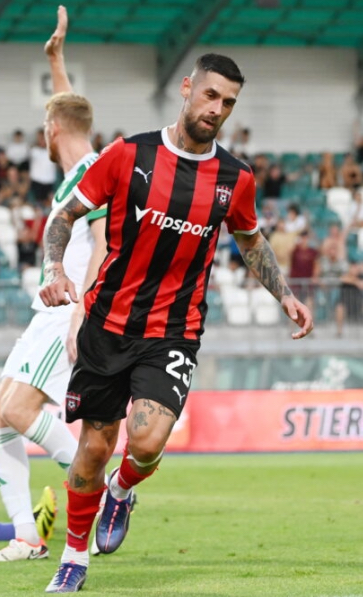
Daniel in 2024

In July 2022, he transferred to Spartak Trnava within Slovakia, where he signed a two-year contract. He proved to be an important player in the 2023-24 UEFA Conference League qualifications for Spartak, scoring 3 goals in 6 games.

On 1 May 2025, Daniel scored the winning goal in a 1–0 win over his former team MFK Ružomberok in the Slovak Cup final.

On 26 August 2025, it was announced by the club that Daniel would be leaving. At his time with Spartak, he played 129 matches, in which he scored 18 goals and provided 15 assists.

=== MFK Skalica ===
On 29 August 2025, it was officially announced that Daniel would be joining fellow league side MFK Skalica.

== Personal life ==
In February 2020, it was announced that Daniel, as an ethnic Slovak, had applied for Slovak citizenship, which would make him eligible to represent the country on international level.

== Honours ==
Slovan Bratislava

- Fortuna Liga: 2019–20, 2020–21
- Slovak Cup: 2019–20, 2020–21

Spartak Trnava

- Slovak Cup: 2022–23, 2024–25

Individual

- Slovak Super Liga Goal of the Month: December 2020
- Slovak First Division Goal of the Month: November 2024
