= Borivoje Filipović =

Serbian footballer

Personal information
- Full name: Borivoje Filipović
- Date of birth: 28 August 1982 (age 44)
- Place of birth: Novi Sad, SFR Yugoslavia
- Height: 1.88 m (6 ft 2 in)
- Position: Striker

Senior career*
Years	Team	Apps	(Gls)
2001–2002	Kabel	21	(3)
2003–2007	Novi Sad	134	(54)
2007–2009	Spartak Trnava	34	(6)
2009–2010	Inđija	30	(12)
2010	Irtysh Pavlodar	13	(0)
2011	Proleter Novi Sad	13	(2)
2011–2012	Novi Sad	16	(4)
2012–2013	Leotar	27	(5)
2016	FK Sofeks Futog		
2018	FK Srbobran		
- * Club domestic league appearances and goals as of 9 May 2018

Borivoje Filipović (Serbian Cyrillic: Боривоје Филиповић; born 28 August 1982) is a Serbian retired footballer who played as a striker.

== Honours ==
=== Club ===
Novi Sad

- Serbian League Vojvodina: 2006–07

Inđija

- Serbian First League: 2009–10

=== Individual ===
- Serbian First League Top Scorer: 2009–10
