= Peter Jakubička =

Slovak footballer

Personal information
- Full name: Peter Jakubička
- Date of birth: 8 September 1985 (age 41)
- Place of birth: Trnava, Czechoslovakia
- Height: 1.88 m (6 ft 2 in)
- Position: Defender

Team information
- Current team: FC Mönchhof
- Number: 16

Youth career
- Lokomotíva Trnava
- Spartak Trnava

Senior career*
Years	Team	Apps	(Gls)
2004–2012	Spartak Trnava	45	(1)
2010–2011	→ Šaľa (loan)		
2011–2012	→ OŠK Križovany (loan)		
2012–2013	FC Mönchhof		
2013–2015	FC Modranka		
2015–2019	Blava Jaslovské Bohunice		
2018	FK Spacince (loan)		
2019–2022	Dynamo Malženice		
2022–2025	SC Getzersdorf		
2025–	ŠK Cífer		
- * Club domestic league appearances and goals as of 6 December 2025

Peter Jakubička (born 8 September 1985) is a Slovak football defender who currently plays for ŠK Cífer.

== Club career ==
Jakubička was a part of the Spartak Trnava squad in 2010. Altogether, he played 45 matches for Spartak, scoring 1 goal in a span of 8 years. In 2011, Jakubička played for FK Slovan Duslo Šaľa.

=== Later career ===
After his loan to OŠK Križovany, Jakubička would play for amateur sides such as FC Mönchhof, Modranka, Blava Jaslovské Bohunice, FK Spacince, and Dynamo Malženice. He made his debut for Malženice in a 1–0 loss against FC Imeľ. Jakubička later also played for SC Getzersdorf and ŠK Cífer.

== Personal life ==
Jakubička is married to Daniella, who gave birth to his first child, in 2011.
