= Michal Ďuriš =

Slovak footballer

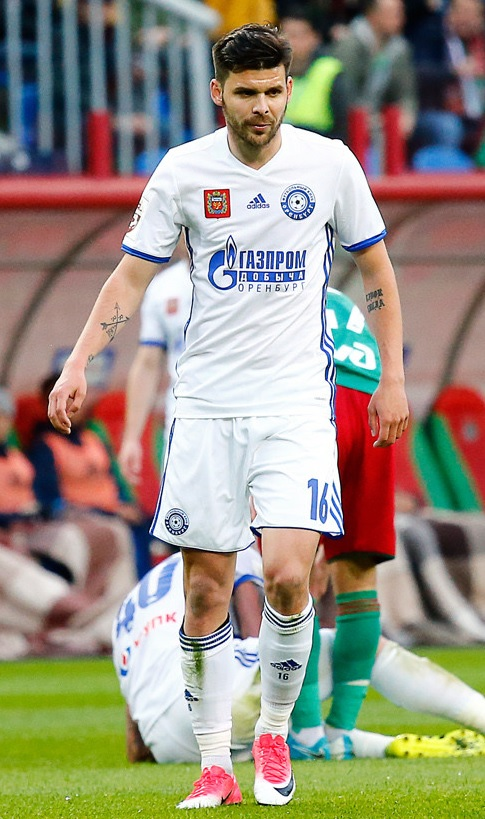
- Ďuriš with Orenburg

Personal information
- Date of birth: 1 June 1988 (age 38)
- Place of birth: Uherské Hradiště, Czechoslovakia
- Height: 1.83 m (6 ft 0 in)
- Position: Forward

Team information
- Current team: Dukla Banská Bystrica
- Number: 57

Youth career
- ŠK Petrochema Dubová
- 2002–2005: Dukla Banská Bystrica

Senior career*
Years	Team	Apps	(Gls)
2005–2010	Dukla Banská Bystrica	114	(18)
2010–2017	Viktoria Plzeň	137	(34)
2014–2015	→ Mladá Boleslav (loan)	26	(4)
2017–2018	Orenburg	27	(4)
2018	→ Anorthosis Famagusta (loan)	14	(11)
2018–2020	Anorthosis Famagusta	49	(16)
2020–2021	Omonia	29	(4)
2022	Ethnikos Achna	15	(5)
2022–2023	Karmiotissa	35	(6)
2023–2024	Othellos Athienou	8	(3)
2023	→ Spartak Trnava (loan)	13	(5)
2024–2026	Spartak Trnava	68	(14)
2026–	Dukla Banská Bystrica	6	(2)

International career
2006–2007	Slovakia U19	18	(7)
2008–2010	Slovakia U21	9	(4)
2012–2021	Slovakia	59	(7)
- * Club domestic league appearances and goals as of 21 September 2026

Michal Ďuriš (Slovak pronunciation: [ˈmixal ˈɟuriʂ]; born 1 June 1988) is a Slovak professional footballer who currently plays for MFK Dukla Banská Bystrica as a forward.

== Club career ==
=== Banská Bystrica ===
Ďuriš joined Banská Bystrica from ŠK Petrochema Dubová when he was 14. After three years playing for youth squads he made his debut in the Slovak top-level football league featuring in his club's 2–0 defeat against Ružomberok on 9 November 2005. During five seasons for Dukla he scored 18 goals in 114 matches overall.

=== Viktoria Plzeň ===
In August 2010, he signed on a one-year loan for Viktoria Plzeň of the Czech Czech First League with an option of a permanent stay. He debuted for Plzeň in a 3–0 away win against České Budějovice on 28 August 2010. In his first season for Plzeň he won the Czech title, the first title in Plzeň's history. He scored two goals for Plzeň in the 2011–12 UEFA Champions League campaign, one in a 2–1 play-off win against Copenhagen and the next in a 2–2 group stage draw against Milan.

On 26 January 2017, he signed a deal with the Russian Premier League side FC Orenburg.

On 17 January 2018, he joined Anorthosis Famagusta on a half-season loan. On 6 July 2018, the transfer became permanent for an estimated fee of €600,000.

=== Spartak Trnava ===
On 16 February 2024, it was announced that Ďuriš would be returning to Spartak Trnava after previously being at the on loan. He made his league debut in a 2–1 home loss against Dunajská Streda, playing the whole match. Ďuriš would score his first goals since returning in the next match against his former club Dukla Banská Bystrica, netting two goals. He would score the second goal in a 2–0 away win over league rivals Slovan Bratislava, securing the win for his team.

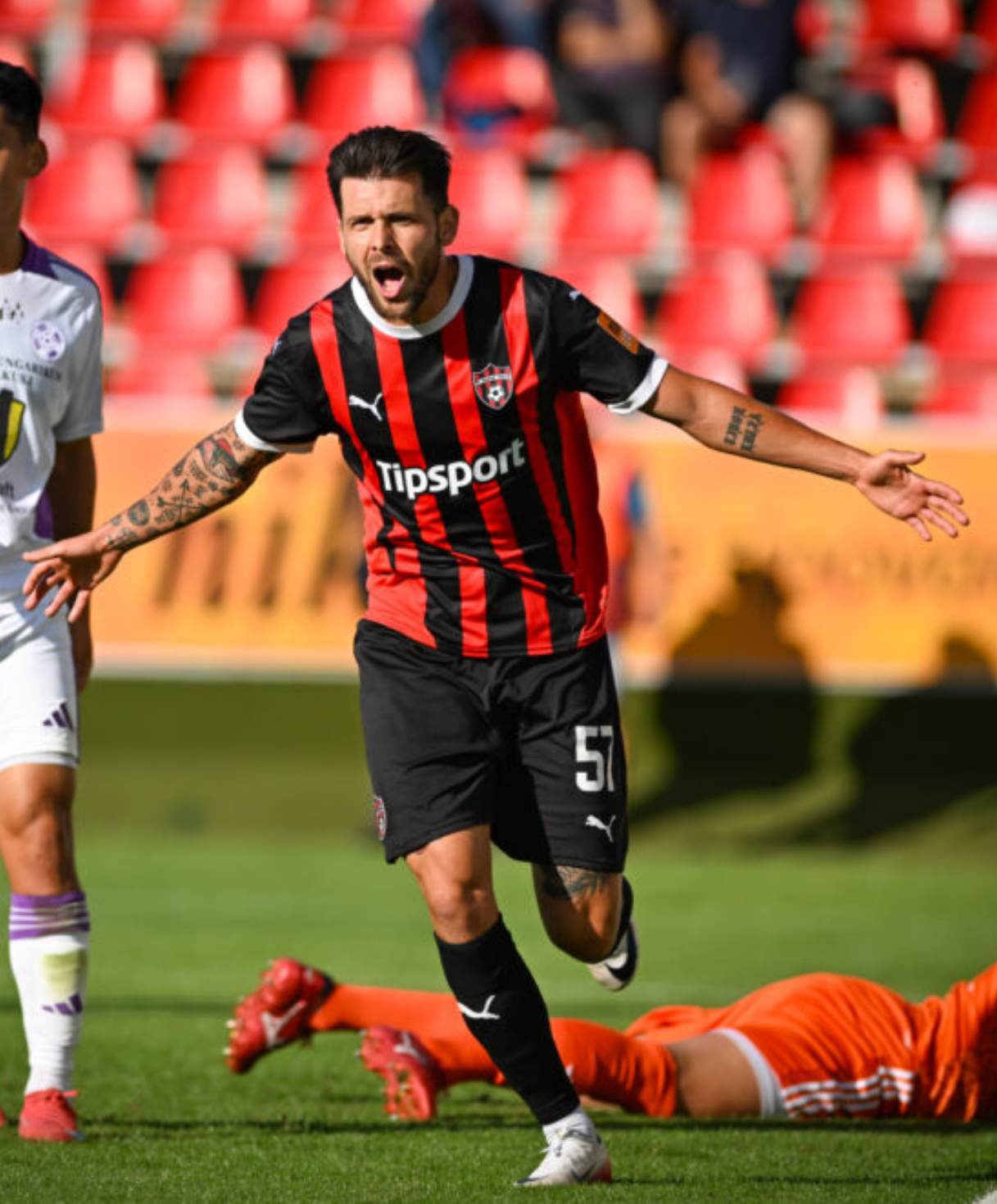
Ďuriš celebrating his goal against Komárno.

In Spartak’s 2024-25 European campaign, Ďuriš scored 5 goals in 4 games, becoming the highest Slovak goal scorer in the Conference League. For the rest of the season he would go on a goal drought, scoring only 5 goals in 31 appearances.

On 25 August 2025, in a 4–1 victory against KFC Komárno, Ďuriš would end his 14 games without a goal. Scoring a header after a well timed cross by captain Martin Mikovič.

== International career ==
Ďuriš made his debut for the national team in the 3–1 away win over Denmark in a friendly match that was held on 15 August 2012.

He scored his first two goals after 20 matches against Switzerland, on 13 November 2015 during a 3–2 victory, with third goal scored by Róbert Mak. Four days later, on 17 November, he netted third goal of a game, during a 3–1 victory over Iceland, with first two goals provided by Mak, again.

Ďuriš scored his fourth goal against Germany in a friendly match in Augsburg, giving Slovakia the 2–1 lead in the pre-EURO 2016 friendly match, which was his 25th cap. Slovakia eventually defeated Germany 3–1. Duris also scored the winning goal for Slovakia in extra-time against Northern Ireland, sending Slovakia to UEFA Euro 2020, where they were placed in Group E.

On 18 May 2021, Ďuriš was included in the final 26-man squad to represent Slovakia at the rescheduled UEFA Euro 2020 tournament.

On 24 August 2021, national team manager Štefan Tarkovič announced Ďuriš's retirement from international duties. Ďuriš retired with 59 appearances and 7 goals, including appearances at two European Championships.

== Career statistics ==
=== Club ===
Club	Season	League			National cup (Note: Includes Slovak Cup, Czech Cup, Russian Cup, Cypriot Cup)		Europe		Other		Total	
Club	Season	Division	Apps	Goals	Apps	Goals	Apps	Goals	Apps	Goals	Apps	Goals
Banská Bystrica	2005–06	Slovak First League	14	0	0	0	—		—		14	0
Banská Bystrica	2006–07	Slovak First League	10	0	0	0	—		—		10	0
Banská Bystrica	2007–08	Slovak First League	26	6	0	0	0	0	—		26	6
Banská Bystrica	2008–09	Slovak First League	30	6	0	0	0	0	—		30	6
Banská Bystrica	2009–10	Slovak First League	24	6	0	0	0	0	—		24	6
Banská Bystrica	2010–11	Slovak First League	5	0	0	0	2 (Note: Appearances in UEFA Europa League)	1	—		7	1
Banská Bystrica	Total		109	18	0	0	2	1	—		111	19
Viktoria Plzeň	2010–11	Czech First League	23	3	0	0	—		—		23	3
Viktoria Plzeň	2011–12	Czech First League	27	6	0	0	14 (Note: Twelve appearances and two goals in UEFA Champions League, two appearances in UEFA Europa League)	2	1 (Note: Appearance in Czech Supercup)	0	42	8
Viktoria Plzeň	2012–13	Czech First League	26	1	0	0	14	6	0	0	40	7
Viktoria Plzeň	2013–14	Czech First League	25	5	4	1	15 (Note: Eleven appearances and two goals in UEFA Champions League, four appearances in UEFA Europa League)	2	0	0	44	8
Viktoria Plzeň	2015–16	Czech First League	25	16	2	0	8 (Note: One appearance in UEFA Champions League, seven appearances and two goals in UEFA Europa League)	2	—		35	18
Viktoria Plzeň	2016–17	Czech First League	11	3	2	1	8 (Note: Four appearances and one goal in UEFA Champions League, four appearances and two goals in UEFA Europa League)	3	—		21	7
Viktoria Plzeň	Total		137	34	8	2	59	15	1	0	205	51
Mladá Boleslav (loan)	2014–15	Czech First League	26	4	5	2	4	3	—		35	9
Orenburg	2016–17	Russian Premier League	12	1	0	0	—		—		12	1
Orenburg	2017–18	Russian Football National League	15	3	2	0	—		—		17	3
Orenburg	Total		27	4	2	0	—		—		29	4
Anorthosis (loan)	2017–18	Cypriot First Division	14	11	2	0	—		—		16	11
Anorthosis	2018–19	Cypriot First Division	29	11	2	2	2	0	—		33	13
Anorthosis	2019–20	Cypriot First Division	20	5	2	1	—		—		22	6
Anorthosis	Total		49	16	6	3	2	0	—		55	19
Omonia	2020–21	Cypriot First Division	24	2	2	0	9 (Note: Four appearances in UEFA Champions League, five appearances in UEFA Europa League)	0	—		35	2
Omonia	2021–22	Cypriot First Division	5	2	0	0	7 (Note: Two appearances in UEFA Champions League, one appearance in UEFA Europa League, four appearances and one goal in UEFA Europa Conference League)	1	1 (Note: Appearance in Cypriot Super Cup)	0	13	3
Omonia	Total		29	4	2	0	16	1	1	0	48	5
Ethnikos Achna	2021–22	Cypriot First Division	16	5	6	4	—		—		22	9
Karmiotissa	2022–23	Cypriot First Division	35	6	2	0	—		—		37	6
Othellos Athienou	2023–24	Cypriot First Division	8	3	1	1	—		—		9	4
Spartak Trnava	2023–24	Slovak First League	23	10	3	3	6 (Note: Appearances in UEFA Conference League)	1	—		32	14
Spartak Trnava	2024–25	Slovak First League	31	5	7	5	4	5	—		42	15
Spartak Trnava	2025-26	Slovak First League	24	4	3	0	6	0			33	4
Spartak Trnava	Total		78	19	13	8	16	6	—		107	33
Career total			527	124	45	20	100	26	2	0	673	170

=== International ===
As of match played on 23 June 2021
Scores and results list Slovakia's goal tally first, score column indicates score after each Ďuriš goal.

List of international goals scored by Michal Ďuriš
No.	Date	Venue	Cap	Opponent	Score	Result	Competition
1	13 November 2015	Štadión Antona Malatinského, Trnava, Slovakia	21	Switzerland	1–0	3–2	Friendly
2	13 November 2015	Štadión Antona Malatinského, Trnava, Slovakia	21	Switzerland	2–0	3–2	Friendly
3	17 November 2015	Štadión pod Dubňom, Žilina, Slovakia	22	Iceland	3–1	3–1	Friendly
4	29 May 2016	WWK Arena, Augsburg, Germany	25	Germany	2–1	3–1	Friendly
5	22 March 2018	Rajamangala National Stadium, Bangkok, Thailand	37	United Arab Emirates	2–0	2–1	2018 King's Cup
6	7 September 2020	Netanya Stadium, Netanya, Israel	48	Israel	1–0	1–1	2020–21 UEFA Nations League B
7	12 November 2020	Windsor Park, Belfast, Northern Ireland	49	Northern Ireland	2–1	2–1 (a.e.t.)	UEFA Euro 2020 qualifying

== Honours ==
Viktoria Plzeň

- Czech First League: 2010–11, 2012–13, 2015–16
- Czech Supercup: 2011, 2015

AC Omonia

- Cypriot First Division: 2020–21
- Cypriot Super Cup: 2021

Spartak Trnava

- Slovak Cup: 2024–25

Slovakia

- King's Cup: 2018
