= Roman Procházka =

Slovak footballer (born 1989)

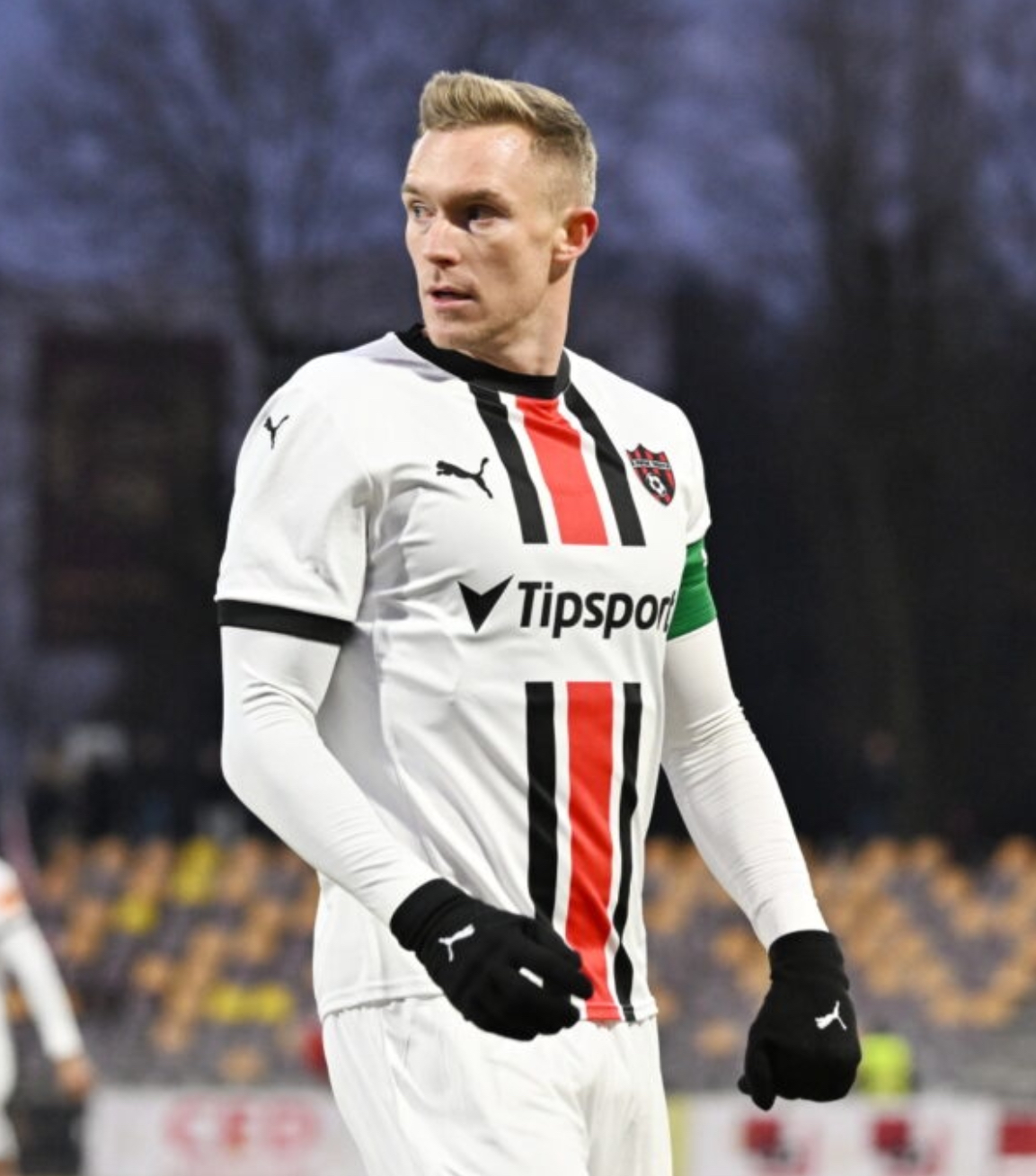
- Procházka playing for Spartak Trnava in 2025

Personal information
- Date of birth: 14 March 1989 (age 37)
- Place of birth: Jaslovské Bohunice, Czechoslovakia
- Height: 1.83 m (6 ft 0 in)
- Position: Midfielder

Team information
- Current team: Spartak Trnava
- Number: 6

Youth career
- Spartak Trnava

Senior career*
Years	Team	Apps	(Gls)
2007–2012	Spartak Trnava	124	(11)
2012–2018	Levski Sofia	145	(25)
2013–2014	→ Spartak Trnava (loan)	31	(6)
2018–2019	Viktoria Plzeň	35	(9)
2020–2021	Górnik Zabrze	42	(0)
2021–	Spartak Trnava	122	(12)

International career
2009–2010	Slovakia U21	12	(1)
2011–2012	Slovakia	3	(0)
- * Club domestic league appearances and goals as of 21 November 2026

Roman Procházka (pronounced [ˈrɔmam ˈprɔxaːska]; born 14 March 1989) is a Slovak professional footballer who plays as a midfielder for Slovak First Football League club Spartak Trnava.

== Club career ==
=== Spartak Trnava ===
Procházka began his career with his hometown club Spartak Trnava. On 13 May 2007, he made his debut for Spartak first team against Eldus Močenok at the age of 18.

=== Levski Sofia ===
Procházka signed with Bulgarian side Levski Sofia on 14 June 2012 on a three-year deal. He made his debut for Levski on 19 July, in a 1–0 home win over FK Sarajevo in a UEFA Europa League match. He made his Bulgarian A Group debut on 11 August, starting in a 1–0 home win over Chernomorets Burgas. Procházka made only 16 league starts throughout his first season with Levski.

==== Spartak Trnava (loan) ====
On 19 June 2013, Procházka was loaned to his previous club Spartak Trnava on a season-long deal.

=== Return to Levski ===
In June 2014, Procházka returned to Levski. After a successful pre-season with the Blues, he was included in Pepe Murcia's squad for the campaign. On 2 August 2014, Procházka scored his debut goal for Levski in a 1–0 win against Lokomotiv Sofia at Georgi Asparuhov Stadium. During the season he became an integral part of the team.

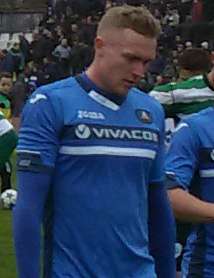
Procházka playing for Levski Sofia

On 18 June 2015, Procházka signed a one-year contract extension, keeping him at Levski until 2016. In July, he was announced as the vice captain. He was given the captain's armband in Levski's first game of the 2015–16 season against Botev Plovdiv. Procházka signed a two-and-a-half-year extension to his current contract with Levski on 30 November 2015, keeping him in the club until 31 December 2018. On 1 October 2017, Procházka played in a 1–0 home win over Cherno More, becoming the foreign player with the most top division appearances for Levski Sofia.

=== Viktoria Plzeň ===
On 29 May 2018, Procházka was signed for free by Czech club Viktoria Plzeň after his contract with Levski expired and was not renewed. Throughout the majority of his stint at Plzeň, Procházka was a regular member of the starting eleven. He also played in five of their six Champions League group stage matches in their 2018–19 european campaign. On 27 November, he scored his only Champions League goal against CSKA Moscow. In the spring, he also played in both Europa League round of 32 matches against Dinamo Zagreb.

In late January 2020, Plzeň's new coach Adrián Guľa told Procházka that he would give space to the other players. He also said that Procházka would only be his fourth of fifth midfield choice and he had permission to find himself a new club.

=== Górnik Zabrze ===
On 27 January 2020, Procházka signed a one-and-a-half-year deal with Polish side Górnik Zabrze.

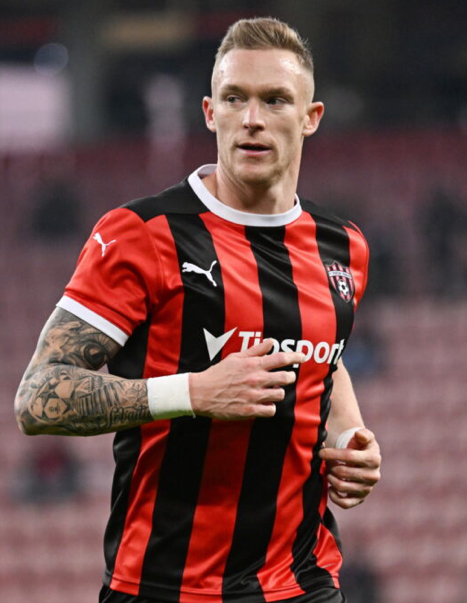
Procházka in 2024

=== Spartak Trnava ===
After his contract in Zabrze expired, Procházka returned to Spartak Trnava after seven years abroad. He signed a two-year contract with the club. He won the Slovak Cup with Spartak in the 2021–22, 2022–23 and 2024–25 seasons. He is currently vice-capitan for league games and captain for European games.

Procházka played the full 90 minutes in a 1–0 home defeat to BK Häcken in the first round of qualification to the Europa League. He scored a direct free-kick in the second leg to tie the score at 1–1.

== International career ==
Procházka made his debut for Slovakia in a 2–1 away win against Austria on 10 August 2011. In that match, he came on as a substitute for Juraj Kucka in 79th minute.

== Career statistics ==
As of match played 27 September 2025

Appearances and goals by club, season and competition
Club	Season	League			National cup (Note: Includes Slovak Cup, Bulgarian Cup, Czech Cup, Polish Cup)		Europe		Other		Total	
Club	Season	Division	Apps	Goals	Apps	Goals	Apps	Goals	Apps	Goals	Apps	Goals
Spartak Trnava	2006–07	Slovak Super Liga	5	1	0	0	—		—		5	1
Spartak Trnava	2007–08	Slovak Super Liga	1	0	0	0	—		—		1	0
Spartak Trnava	2008–09	Slovak Super Liga	28	0	0	0	1 (Note: Appearance in UEFA Cup)	0	—		29	0
Spartak Trnava	2009–10	Slovak Super Liga	29	3	5	0	4 (Note: Appearances in UEFA Europa League)	1	—		38	4
Spartak Trnava	2010–11	Slovak Super Liga	30	3	4	1	—		—		34	4
Spartak Trnava	2011–12	Slovak First Football League	31	4	3	0	7	1	—		41	5
Spartak Trnava	Total		124	11	12	1	12	2	—		148	14
Levski Sofia	2012–13	A Group	21	0	7	0	2	0	—		30	0
Levski Sofia	2014–15	A Group	27	4	6	0	—		—		33	4
Levski Sofia	2015–16	A Group	33	8	2	0	—		—		35	8
Levski Sofia	2016–17	Bulgarian First League	30	8	2	0	2	0	—		34	8
Levski Sofia	2017–18	Bulgarian First League	35	5	5	0	4	1	1 (Note: Appearance in Bulgarian First League European play-off)	0	45	6
Levski Sofia	Total		146	25	22	0	8	1	1	0	175	26
Spartak Trnava (loan)	2013–14	Slovak First Football League	31	6	3	1	—		—		34	7
Viktoria Plzeň	2018–19	Czech First League	23	6	2	1	7 (Note: Five appearances and one goal in UEFA Champions League, two appearances in UEFA Europa League)	1	—		32	8
Viktoria Plzeň	2019–20	Czech First League	12	3	2	1	0	0	—		14	4
Viktoria Plzeň	Total		35	9	4	2	7	1	—		46	12
Górnik Zabrze	2019–20	Ekstraklasa	14	0	2	0	—		—		16	0
Górnik Zabrze	2020–21	Ekstraklasa	28	0	0	0	—		—		28	0
Górnik Zabrze	Total		42	0	2	0	—		—		44	0
Spartak Trnava	2021–22	Slovak First Football League	24	2	5	1	6 (Note: Appearances in UEFA Conference League)	0	–		35	3
Spartak Trnava	2022–23	Slovak First Football League	24	2	7	1	2	0	—		33	3
Spartak Trnava	2023–24	Slovak First Football League	23	0	6	1	9	1	—		38	2
Spartak Trnava	2024–25	Slovak First Football League	26	4	7	1	4	0	—		37	5
Spartak Trnava	2025–26	Slovak First Football League	6	4	1	0	6 (Note: Two appearances and one goal in UEFA Europa League, four appearances and one goal in UEFA Conference League)	2	—		13	6
Spartak Trnava	Total		103	12	26	4	27	3	—		156	19
Career total			439	63	67	8	54	7	1	0	561	78

== Honours ==
Spartak Trnava

- Slovak Cup: 2021–22, 2022–23, 2024–25
