= List of Slovak football transfers winter 2021–22 =

Notable Slovak football transfers in the winter transfer window of the 2021–22 season by club.

== Fortuna Liga ==
=== ŠK Slovan Bratislava ===
In: Note: Flags indicate national team as defined under FIFA eligibility rules; some limited exceptions apply. Players may hold more than one non-FIFA nationality.

No.	Pos.	Nation	Player
12	MF	ARM	Tigran Barseghyan (from (Kazakhstan) Astana)
9	FW	SRB	Ivan Šaponjić (from (Spain) Atlético Madrid)

Out: Note: Flags indicate national team as defined under FIFA eligibility rules; some limited exceptions apply. Players may hold more than one non-FIFA nationality.

No.	Pos.	Nation	Player
26	MF	SVK	Filip Lichý (on loan to (Slovakia) Ružomberok)
6	MF	NED	Joeri de Kamps (on loan to (Netherlands) Sparta Rotterdam)
9	FW	NGA	Ezekiel Henty (on loan to (Saudi Arabia) Al-Hazem)
—	MF	CZE	Ondřej Petrák (to (Czech Republic) Bohemians 1905)
13	MF	SRB	Dejan Dražić (on loan to (Hungary) Honvéd)

=== FC DAC 1904 Dunajská Streda ===
In: Note: Flags indicate national team as defined under FIFA eligibility rules; some limited exceptions apply. Players may hold more than one non-FIFA nationality.

No.	Pos.	Nation	Player
—	FW	UKR	Stanislav Bilenkyi (loan return from (Belarus) Dynamo Brest)
78	DF	POR	Alex Pinto (from (Portugal) Farense)
29	MF	POR	Andrezinho (from (Portugal) Mafra)
1	GK	POR	Ricardo (from (Portugal) Portimonense S.C.)
11	FW	HUN	Norbert Balogh (on loan from (Hungary) Budapest Honvéd FC)
—	MF	HUN	Regő Szánthó (on loan from (Hungary) Ferencvárosi TC)

Out: Note: Flags indicate national team as defined under FIFA eligibility rules; some limited exceptions apply. Players may hold more than one non-FIFA nationality.

No.	Pos.	Nation	Player
—	FW	UKR	Stanislav Bilenkyi (to (Georgia (country)) Dinamo Tbilisi)
98	FW	MDA	Ion Nicolaescu (on loan to (Israel) Maccabi Petah Tikva)
11	MF	CMR	Didier Lamkel Zé (loan return to (Belgium) Royal Antwerp)
26	MF	HUN	András Schäfer (to (Germany) Union Berlin)
3	DF	UKR	Danylo Beskorovainyi (on loan to (Kazakhstan) Astana)
—	MF	SVK	Andrej Fábry (on loan to ŠKF Sereď)

=== FC Spartak Trnava ===
In: Note: Flags indicate national team as defined under FIFA eligibility rules; some limited exceptions apply. Players may hold more than one non-FIFA nationality.

No.	Pos.	Nation	Player
6	MF	POL	Miłosz Kozak (free agent)
77	DF	NGA	Kazeem Bolaji (from (Estonia) Viljandi JK Tulevik)
91	MF	BRA	Dyjan de Azevedo (from (Czech Republic) FC Baník Ostrava)
—	DF	SVK	Kristián Mihálek (loan return from (Slovakia) Peržalka)
—	FW	NGA	Kenneth Ikugar (from (Czech Republic) FK Ústí nad Labem)

Out: Note: Flags indicate national team as defined under FIFA eligibility rules; some limited exceptions apply. Players may hold more than one non-FIFA nationality.

No.	Pos.	Nation	Player
5	DF	SVN	Dejan Trajkovski (Released and joined (Bosnia and Herzegovina) Zrinjski Mostar)
12	DF	SVK	Mário Mihál (on loan to (Slovakia) Senica)
23	DF	CZE	Filip Twardzik (to (Austria) LASK)
70	MF	USA	Zyen Jones (loan return to (Hungary) Ferencvárosi TC II)
79	MF	BRA	Saymon Cabral (to (United Arab Emirates) Khor Fakkan)
90	GK	SVK	Denis Chudý (on loan to (Slovakia) Rohožník)
—	DF	SVK	Kristián Mihálek (Released and joined (Slovakia) Skalica)

=== MŠK Žilina ===
In: Note: Flags indicate national team as defined under FIFA eligibility rules; some limited exceptions apply. Players may hold more than one non-FIFA nationality.

No.	Pos.	Nation	Player
11	FW	COD	Elvis Mashike Sukisa (from (Slovakia) Senica)
—	MF	SVK	Roland Galčík (from (Slovakia) Železiarne Podbrezová)

Out: Note: Flags indicate national team as defined under FIFA eligibility rules; some limited exceptions apply. Players may hold more than one non-FIFA nationality.

No.	Pos.	Nation	Player
27	DF	SVK	Branislav Sluka (on loan to (Hungary) MTK Budapest)
11	MF	ARM	Vahan Bichakhchyan (to (Poland) Pogoń Szczecin)
20	FW	SVK	Adam Goljan (to (Czech Republic) Sparta Prague B)
—	MF	SVK	Roland Galčík (on loan to (Slovakia) Železiarne Podbrezová)
18	MF	MKD	Enis Fazlagikj (to (Poland) Wisła Kraków)
—	FW	NGA	Taofiq Jibril (on loan to (Slovakia) FC ViOn Zlaté Moravce)
—	DF	SVK	Vladimír Majdan (on loan to (Slovakia) MŠK Púchov)
—	DF	SVK	Samuel Suľa (on loan to (Slovakia) FC ViOn Zlaté Moravce)
—	DF	SVK	Matej Moško (on loan to (Slovakia) FC Košice)
11	FW	COD	Elvis Mashike Sukisa (Released)

=== FC ViOn Zlaté Moravce ===
In: Note: Flags indicate national team as defined under FIFA eligibility rules; some limited exceptions apply. Players may hold more than one non-FIFA nationality.

No.	Pos.	Nation	Player
TBA	DF	SVK	Michal Pintér (from (Slovakia) Tatran Liptovský Mikuláš)
TBA	MF	MKD	Tomche Grozdanovski (loan return from (Croatia) Dugopolje)
TBA	MF	GRE	Georgios Neofytidis (from (Slovakia) Zemplín Michalovce)
TBA	FW	SVK	Tomáš Horák (from (Slovakia) Slovan Galanta)
—	FW	NGA	Taofiq Jibril (on loan from (Slovakia) MŠK Žilina)
—	DF	SVK	Samuel Suľa (on loan from (Slovakia) MŠK Žilina)

Out: Note: Flags indicate national team as defined under FIFA eligibility rules; some limited exceptions apply. Players may hold more than one non-FIFA nationality.

No.	Pos.	Nation	Player
7	FW	GEO	David Mujiri (Released)
29	MF	SVK	Martin Gamboš (Released and joined (Germany) Viktoria Berlin)
11	FW	TUR	Kubilay Yilmaz (to (Slovakia) Zemplín Michalovce)

=== AS Trenčín ===
In: Note: Flags indicate national team as defined under FIFA eligibility rules; some limited exceptions apply. Players may hold more than one non-FIFA nationality.

No.	Pos.	Nation	Player
TBA	FW	CPV	Eynel Soares (from free agent)
—	GK	MKD	Dejan Iliev (from Free agent)
—	MF	SRB	Filip Bainović (from (Poland) Górnik Zabrze)

Out: Note: Flags indicate national team as defined under FIFA eligibility rules; some limited exceptions apply. Players may hold more than one non-FIFA nationality.

No.	Pos.	Nation	Player
6	DF	SVK	Martin Šulek (End of contract and joined (Slovakia) Sereď)
34	GK	CZE	Tomáš Fryšták (to (Czech Republic) Slovácko)
7	MF	NGA	Ahmad Ghali (to (Czech Republic) Slovan Liberec)
—	DF	BRA	Ramón (on loan to MŠK Púchov)

=== ŠKF Sereď ===
In: Note: Flags indicate national team as defined under FIFA eligibility rules; some limited exceptions apply. Players may hold more than one non-FIFA nationality.

No.	Pos.	Nation	Player
TBA	DF	MKD	Todor Todoroski (from (Serbia) Radnički Niš)
TBA	MF	SVK	Martin Košťál (from (Poland) Jagiellonia Białystok)
TBA	DF	SVK	Martin Šulek (from (Slovakia) Trenčín)
TBA	GK	CZE	Petr Bolek (on loan from (Czech Republic) MFK Karviná)
TBA	MF	SVK	Andrej Fábry (on loan from DAC Dunajská Streda)
—	DF	LUX	Edin Osmanovic (from (Luxembourg) FC Differdange 03)
—	MF	BIH	Amar Tahrić (from (Bosnia and Herzegovina) FK Borac Banja Luka)

Out: Note: Flags indicate national team as defined under FIFA eligibility rules; some limited exceptions apply. Players may hold more than one non-FIFA nationality.

No.	Pos.	Nation	Player
1	GK	MKD	Dejan Iliev (loan return to (England) Arsenal)
7	MF	CZE	Dominik Kříž (loan return to (Czech Republic) Viktoria Plzeň)
10	MF	CRO	Nikola Gatarić (Released)
—	DF	JPN	Itsuki Urata (Released)
22	DF	SVK	Andrej Kadlec (to (Hungary) MTK Budapest)
8	MF	CZE	Ondřej Machuča (to (Czech Republic) Fotbal Třinec)
29	MF	SRB	Petar Mićin (loan return to (Italy) Udinese)
32	MF	ALB	Bernard Karrica (loan return to (Croatia) Rijeka)
6	DF	SVK	Ľubomír Michalík (to (Slovakia) Slovan Galanta)
21	FW	SVK	Samuel Prachar (to (Slovakia) Pohronie)
—	GK	NGA	Ayotunde Ikuepamitan (Released)
—	FW	SVK	Marek Kuzma (to FK Železiarne Podbrezová)

=== MFK Ružomberok ===
In: Note: Flags indicate national team as defined under FIFA eligibility rules; some limited exceptions apply. Players may hold more than one non-FIFA nationality.

No.	Pos.	Nation	Player
—	DF	SVK	Tomáš Filipiak (loan return from (Slovakia) Partizán Bardejov)
—	FW	SVK	Rastislav Kružliak (loan return from (Slovakia) Partizán Bardejov)
TBA	MF	SVK	Kristóf Domonkos (from (Slovakia) Komárno)
TBA	MF	SVK	Filip Lichý (on loan from (Slovakia) Slovan Bratislava)

Out: Note: Flags indicate national team as defined under FIFA eligibility rules; some limited exceptions apply. Players may hold more than one non-FIFA nationality.

No.	Pos.	Nation	Player
20	MF	MKD	Tihomir Kostadinov (to (Poland) Piast Gliwice)
—	FW	SVK	Rastislav Kružliak (to (Austria) Tadten)
29	MF	SVK	Adam Brenkus (on loan to (Slovakia) Partizán Bardejov)
8	MF	SVK	Dalibor Takáč (to (Poland) Korona Kielce)
23	MF	SVK	Michal Dopater (on loan to (Slovakia) Partizán Bardejov)
—	DF	SVK	Tomáš Filipiak (to (Slovakia) Slavoj Trebišov)

=== FK Pohronie ===
In: Note: Flags indicate national team as defined under FIFA eligibility rules; some limited exceptions apply. Players may hold more than one non-FIFA nationality.

No.	Pos.	Nation	Player
TBA	DF	CIV	Ahmed Fofana (from (Czech Republic) Chrudim)
TBA	MF	SVK	Christián Steinhübel (from (Czech Republic) Fotbal Třinec)
TBA	DF	SVK	Ivan Straka (from (Slovakia) Železiarne Podbrezová)
TBA	DF	SVK	Martin Klabník (from (Poland) GKS Bełchatów)
TBA	DF	CAN	Milovan Kapor (from (Canada) Atlético Ottawa)
TBA	MF	CZE	Dan Ožvolda (from (Czech Republic) Vratimov)
TBA	DF	GAM	Muhammed Sanneh (on loan from (Czech Republic) Baník Ostrava)
TBA	GK	SVK	Patrik Le Giang (from (Czech Republic) Bohemians 1905)
TBA	FW	SVK	Samuel Prachar (from (Slovakia) Sereď)
TBA	DF	SVN	Sandi Ćoralić (from (Slovenia) Fužinar)
TBA	MF	SVK	Jaroslav Mihalík (from free agent)
TBA	MF	SVK	Dominik Sandal (from (Hungary) Pápai PFC)
TBA	DF	SVK	Milan Šimčák (from free agent)
—	MF	SVK	Martin Chrien (from (Hungary) Mezőkövesdi SE)

Out: Note: Flags indicate national team as defined under FIFA eligibility rules; some limited exceptions apply. Players may hold more than one non-FIFA nationality.

No.	Pos.	Nation	Player
2	DF	CZE	Daniel Horák (loan return to (Czech Republic) Sparta Prague B)
4	DF	POL	Aleksander Paluszek (loan return to (Poland) Górnik Zabrze)
23	MF	POL	Daniel Ściślak (loan return to (Poland) Górnik Zabrze)
33	MF	SVK	Richard Lásik (Released ad joined FC Košice)
21	FW	SVK	Filip Mastiš (Released)
9	FW	BRA	Raffael (Released)
32	DF	SVK	Dominik Špiriak (Released)
24	DF	CZE	Pavel Čmovš (Released and joined (Romania) Academica Clinceni)
27	MF	SVK	Martin Adamec (Released and joined (Malaysia) PDRM)
17	GK	SVK	Libor Hrdlička (Released)
77	DF	SVK	Peter Mazan (to (Slovakia) Dukla Banská Bystrica)
7	FW	SVK	Filip Škrteľ (Released and joined (Slovakia) Nová Baňa)
20	MF	SVK	Marek Výbošťok (Released and joined (Slovakia) Nová Baňa)
10	MF	BFA	Cedric Badolo (on loan to (Moldova) Sheriff Tiraspol)
—	DF	SVK	Timotej Záhumenský (on loan to (Slovakia) MFK Dukla Banská Bystrica)

=== MFK Zemplín Michalovce ===
In: Note: Flags indicate national team as defined under FIFA eligibility rules; some limited exceptions apply. Players may hold more than one non-FIFA nationality.

No.	Pos.	Nation	Player
TBA	GK	SVK	Tomáš Dráb (loan return from (Slovakia) Slavoj Trebišov)
TBA	FW	AUT	Kubilay Yilmaz (from (Slovakia) Zlaté Moravce)
TBA	GK	SVK	Matej Vajs (from Free Agent)
—	MF	SVK	Dávid Petrík (from MFK Zemplín Michalovce youth)
—	MF	SVK	Tobias Bujňaček (from MFK Zemplín Michalovce youth)
—	MF	JPN	Yushi Shimamura (on loan from ŠK Tvrdošín)
—	FW	MKD	David Toshevski (on loan from (Russia) FC Rostov)
74	FW	EGY	Beso (on loan from (Czech Republic) Žižkov)

Out: Note: Flags indicate national team as defined under FIFA eligibility rules; some limited exceptions apply. Players may hold more than one non-FIFA nationality.

No.	Pos.	Nation	Player
14	MF	NGA	Bankole Adekuoroye (Released)
99	MF	NCA	Pablo Gállego (to (Greece) Pierikos)
27	MF	SVK	Milan Kvocera (Released)
8	MF	ESP	José Casado (on loan to (Slovakia) Slavoj Trebišov)
28	MF	GRE	Georgios Neofytidis (to (Slovakia) Zlaté Moravce)
—	FW	SVK	Matej Trusa (to (Czech Republic) FC Viktoria Plzeň)

=== FK Senica ===
In: Note: Flags indicate national team as defined under FIFA eligibility rules; some limited exceptions apply. Players may hold more than one non-FIFA nationality.

No.	Pos.	Nation	Player}
3	DF	SVK	Mário Mihál (on loan from (Slovakia) Spartak Trnava)
22	MF	FRA	Abdoulaye Ouattara (Free agent)
23	MF	SVK	Marko Totka (from (Czech Republic) Sokol Lanžhot)
25	DF	CMR	Raphaël Anaba (Free agent)
28	DF	CTA	Cyriaque Mayounga (from (England) Wolverhampton Wanderers Under-23s)
88	MF	IDN	Witan Sulaeman (on loan from (Poland) Lechia Gdańsk)

Out: Note: Flags indicate national team as defined under FIFA eligibility rules; some limited exceptions apply. Players may hold more than one non-FIFA nationality.

No.	Pos.	Nation	Player
3	DF	CZE	David Gáč (loan return to (Czech Republic) Fotbal Třinec)
27	FW	COD	Elvis Mashike Sukisa (to (Slovakia) Žilina)
2	DF	SVK	Milan Šimčák (Released)
23	MF	CAN	Kris Twardek (to (Republic of Ireland) Bohemians)
7	MF	CZE	Šimon Šumbera (Released)
—	GK	SVK	Henrich Ravas (to (Poland) Widzew Łódź)
—	DF	CZE	Petr Pavlík (Left due financial problems)
—	DF	CZE	Tomáš Egert (Left due financial problems)
—	DF	CZE	Václav Svoboda (Left due to financial problems)
—	FW	SVK	Filip Oršula (Left due to financial problems)
—	FW	SVK	Juraj Piroska (Left due to financial problems)
—	FW	SVK	Milan Jurdík (Left due to financial problems)

=== MFK Tatran Liptovský Mikuláš ===
In: Note: Flags indicate national team as defined under FIFA eligibility rules; some limited exceptions apply. Players may hold more than one non-FIFA nationality.

No.	Pos.	Nation	Player
TBA	DF	SVK	František Pavúk (on loan from (Slovakia) Košice)
TBA	DF	SVK	Richard Nagy (on loan from (Slovakia) Žilina B)
TBA	FW	SVK	Adam Matoš (from (Slovakia) Slovan Bratislava B)
TBA	DF	SVK	Lukáš Bielák (on loan from (Poland) Podhale Nowy Targ)
—	DF	CZE	Martin Šindelář (on loan from (Czech Republic) MFK Karviná)

Out: Note: Flags indicate national team as defined under FIFA eligibility rules; some limited exceptions apply. Players may hold more than one non-FIFA nationality.

No.	Pos.	Nation	Player
4	DF	CZE	Robin Hranáč (loan return to (Czech Republic) Viktoria Plzeň B)
26	DF	SVK	Michal Pintér (to (Slovakia) Zlaté Moravce)
37	DF	SVK	Dávid Krčík (on loan to (Czech Republic) Vysočina Jihlava)

== 2. liga ==
=== MFK Dukla Banská Bystrica ===
In: Note: Flags indicate national team as defined under FIFA eligibility rules; some limited exceptions apply. Players may hold more than one non-FIFA nationality.

No.	Pos.	Nation	Player
—	DF	SVK	Peter Mazan (from FK Pohronie)
—	DF	SVK	Timotej Záhumenský (on loan from (Slovakia) FK Pohronie)
—	FW	SVK	Matej Franko (on loan from (Slovakia) FC Nitra)

Out: Note: Flags indicate national team as defined under FIFA eligibility rules; some limited exceptions apply. Players may hold more than one non-FIFA nationality.

No.	Pos.	Nation	Player

=== MFK Skalica ===
In: Note: Flags indicate national team as defined under FIFA eligibility rules; some limited exceptions apply. Players may hold more than one non-FIFA nationality.

No.	Pos.	Nation	Player
—	MF	SVK	Kristián Mihálek (from Free agent)

Out: Note: Flags indicate national team as defined under FIFA eligibility rules; some limited exceptions apply. Players may hold more than one non-FIFA nationality.

No.	Pos.	Nation	Player

=== FK Železiarne Podbrezová ===
In: Note: Flags indicate national team as defined under FIFA eligibility rules; some limited exceptions apply. Players may hold more than one non-FIFA nationality.

No.	Pos.	Nation	Player
—	FW	SVK	Marek Kuzma (from ŠKF Sereď)
—	MF	SVK	Roland Galčík (on loan from MŠK Žilina)

Out: Note: Flags indicate national team as defined under FIFA eligibility rules; some limited exceptions apply. Players may hold more than one non-FIFA nationality.

No.	Pos.	Nation	Player
—	DF	SVK	Ivan Straka (to FK Pohronie)
—	MF	SVK	Roland Galčík (to MŠK Žilina)
—	MF	MKD	Martin Talakov (on loan to (Slovakia) MŠK Žilina)

=== FC Košice ===
In: Note: Flags indicate national team as defined under FIFA eligibility rules; some limited exceptions apply. Players may hold more than one non-FIFA nationality.

No.	Pos.	Nation	Player
—	MF	SVK	Marcel Vasiľ (on loan from (Poland) Bruk-Bet Termalica Nieciecza)
—	MF	SVK	Richard Lásik (from FK Pohronie)
—	DF	SVK	Matej Moško (on loan from (Slovakia) MŠK Žilina)

Out: Note: Flags indicate national team as defined under FIFA eligibility rules; some limited exceptions apply. Players may hold more than one non-FIFA nationality.

No.	Pos.	Nation	Player
—	DF	SVK	František Pavúk (on loan to MFK Tatran Liptovský Mikuláš)
15	DF	COL	Dairín González (Released)
—	FW	KOR	Gyu-Hyun Jung (Released)
—	MF	KOR	Min-seo Kim (Released)

=== FC ŠTK 1914 Šamorín ===
In: Note: Flags indicate national team as defined under FIFA eligibility rules; some limited exceptions apply. Players may hold more than one non-FIFA nationality.

No.	Pos.	Nation	Player
—	MF	UKR	Vladyslav Khomutov (from (Estonia) Nõmme Kalju FC)

Out: Note: Flags indicate national team as defined under FIFA eligibility rules; some limited exceptions apply. Players may hold more than one non-FIFA nationality.

No.	Pos.	Nation	Player
TBA	MF	SVK	Denis Jančo (to FK Humenné)
—	DF	SVK	Šimon Dolinský (loan return to FC DAC 1904 Dunajská Streda)
—	MF	SVK	Ferenc Bögi (loan return to FC DAC 1904 Dunajská Streda)

=== MŠK Púchov ===
In: Note: Flags indicate national team as defined under FIFA eligibility rules; some limited exceptions apply. Players may hold more than one non-FIFA nationality.

No.	Pos.	Nation	Player
—	MF	SVK	Jakub Michlík (on loan from MŠK Žilina B)
—	DF	SVK	Vladimír Majdan (on loan from (Slovakia) MŠK Žilina)
—	MF	SVK	Matúš Pavlovčík (on loan from FK Slovan Duslo Šaľa)
—	MF	SVK	Tomáš Kubík (on loan from MFK Ružomberok)
—	DF	BRA	Ramón (on loan from AS Trenčín)

Out: Note: Flags indicate national team as defined under FIFA eligibility rules; some limited exceptions apply. Players may hold more than one non-FIFA nationality.

No.	Pos.	Nation	Player
—	DF	SVK	Samuel Ludha (to (Austria) ASK Mannersdorf)
—	MF	SVK	Adrián Kopičár (to (Czech Republic) FK Viktoria Žižkov)

=== KFC Komárno ===
In: Note: Flags indicate national team as defined under FIFA eligibility rules; some limited exceptions apply. Players may hold more than one non-FIFA nationality.

No.	Pos.	Nation	Player
—	MF	UKR	Vasyl Vashkeba (from (Hungary) Győri ETO FC)
—	MF	SVK	Martin Jurina (from MFK Ružomberok)
—	MF	SVK	András Mészáros (from (Romania) FK Miercurea Ciuc)

Out: Note: Flags indicate national team as defined under FIFA eligibility rules; some limited exceptions apply. Players may hold more than one non-FIFA nationality.

No.	Pos.	Nation	Player
—	MF	SVK	Kristóf Domonkos (to MFK Ružomberok)
—	MF	HUN	Arthur Györgyi (from (Hungary) Budafoki MTE)

=== FC Petržalka ===
In: Note: Flags indicate national team as defined under FIFA eligibility rules; some limited exceptions apply. Players may hold more than one non-FIFA nationality.

No.	Pos.	Nation	Player

Out: Note: Flags indicate national team as defined under FIFA eligibility rules; some limited exceptions apply. Players may hold more than one non-FIFA nationality.

No.	Pos.	Nation	Player
—	MF	SVK	Kristián Mihálek (loan return to FC Spartak Trnava)

=== FK Slavoj Trebišov ===
In: Note: Flags indicate national team as defined under FIFA eligibility rules; some limited exceptions apply. Players may hold more than one non-FIFA nationality.

No.	Pos.	Nation	Player
—	MF	ESP	José Casado (from Free agent)
—	FW	SVK	Roland Černák (on loan from FK Humenné)
—	DF	SVK	Timotej Maguľak (on loan from 1. FC Tatran Prešov)
—	DF	SVK	Tomáš Filipiak (on loan from MFK Ružomberok)

Out: Note: Flags indicate national team as defined under FIFA eligibility rules; some limited exceptions apply. Players may hold more than one non-FIFA nationality.

No.	Pos.	Nation	Player
—	MF	SVK	Jakub Michlík (loan return to MŠK Žilina B)
—	MF	SVK	Patrik Košuda (loan return to FK Pohronie)
—	GK	SVK	Martin Repiský (loan return to FK Pohronie)
—	GK	CZE	Martin Melichar (loan return to (Czech Republic) 1. FK Příbram)
—	MF	SVK	Jakub Verčimák (on loan to MFK Vranov nad Topľou)
—	FW	GEO	Bakuri Jinjolava (Released)
—	MF	SVK	Samuel Kuba (Released)
—	DF	SVK	Sebastián Jurčišin (loan return to FK Poprad)

=== FK Dubnica ===
In: Note: Flags indicate national team as defined under FIFA eligibility rules; some limited exceptions apply. Players may hold more than one non-FIFA nationality.

No.	Pos.	Nation	Player
—	FW	KOS	Muhamed Dubova (from (Kosovo) SC Gjilani)
—	FW	MNE	Miladin Vujošević (from Free agent)

Out: Note: Flags indicate national team as defined under FIFA eligibility rules; some limited exceptions apply. Players may hold more than one non-FIFA nationality.

No.	Pos.	Nation	Player
—	FW	SVK	Marek Kuzma (loan return to ŠKF Sereď)
—	FW	SVK	Peter Bryndziar (loan return to MFK Bytča)

=== MŠK Žilina B ===
In: Note: Flags indicate national team as defined under FIFA eligibility rules; some limited exceptions apply. Players may hold more than one non-FIFA nationality.

No.	Pos.	Nation	Player
—	MF	MKD	Andrej Stojcevski (from (North Macedonia) Akademija Pandev)
—	MF	MKD	Martin Talakov (on loan from (Slovakia) Železiarne Podbrezová)

Out: Note: Flags indicate national team as defined under FIFA eligibility rules; some limited exceptions apply. Players may hold more than one non-FIFA nationality.

No.	Pos.	Nation	Player
—	FW	SVK	Roland Gerebenits (to (Cyprus) Enosis Neon Paralimni)
—	DF	SVK	Richard Nagy (on loan to MFK Tatran Liptovský Mikuláš)
—	MF	NGA	Tenton Yenne (to (Armenia) Noravank SC)

=== Partizán Bardejov ===
In: Note: Flags indicate national team as defined under FIFA eligibility rules; some limited exceptions apply. Players may hold more than one non-FIFA nationality.

No.	Pos.	Nation	Player
—	MF	SVK	Adam Brenkus (on loan from MFK Ružomberok)
—	MF	SVK	Michal Dopater (on loan from MFK Ružomberok)
—	MF	SRB	Nikola Ristovski (from (Serbia) OFK Bačka)
—	DF	SRB	Mihailo Cmiljanović (from (Czech Republic) 1.FK Příbram)
—	DF	SVK	Sebastián Jurčišin (on loan from FK Poprad)
—	DF	SVK	Juraj Kuc (on loan from FK Poprad)
—	DF	SVK	Dominik Lukáč (from (Germany) SV Grün-Weiß Siemerode)
—	FW	CRO	Mateo Panadić (from Free agent)
—	MF	NGA	Bankole Adekuoroye (from MFK Zemplín Michalovce)
—	DF	SVK	Richard Nemergut (from Free agent)

Out: Note: Flags indicate national team as defined under FIFA eligibility rules; some limited exceptions apply. Players may hold more than one non-FIFA nationality.

No.	Pos.	Nation	Player
—	DF	SVK	Tomáš Filipiak (loan return to MFK Ružomberok)
—	FW	SVK	Rastislav Kružliak (loan return to MFK Ružomberok)
—	MF	NGA	Anthony Ikedi (Released)
—	DF	SVK	Miroslav Petko (End of professional career)
—	MF	SVK	Roman Zemko (to FC Rohožník)
—	DF	SRB	Stefan Veličković (Released)
—	MF	BRA	Junior Da Silva (Released)
—	MF	BIH	Sanjin Lelić (Released)
—	DF	BRA	Diego Fracarolli Pacheco (Released)
—	MF	BIH	Kojo Matić (Released)
—	MF	SVK	Jakub Krela (Released)
—	MF	NGA	Salisu Abdullahi (Released)

=== ŠK Slovan Bratislava B ===
In: Note: Flags indicate national team as defined under FIFA eligibility rules; some limited exceptions apply. Players may hold more than one non-FIFA nationality.

No.	Pos.	Nation	Player
—	DF	MKD	Martin Radulovikj-Velichkovikj (from (North Macedonia) FK Pelister)

Out: Note: Flags indicate national team as defined under FIFA eligibility rules; some limited exceptions apply. Players may hold more than one non-FIFA nationality.

No.	Pos.	Nation	Player
—	MF	ESP	Felipe Fitz (to (Spain) Getafe CF U19)
—	FW	SVK	Adam Matoš (to (Slovakia) Tatran Liptovský Mikuláš)

=== FK Humenné ===
In: Note: Flags indicate national team as defined under FIFA eligibility rules; some limited exceptions apply. Players may hold more than one non-FIFA nationality.

No.	Pos.	Nation	Player
TBA	MF	SVK	Denis Jančo (from FC ŠTK 1914 Šamorín)
—	MF	KOR	Hwan-young Song (from (South Korea) Chungnam Asan FC)
—	FW	CZE	Dušan Pinc (on loan from (Czech Republic) Viktoria Plzeň B)
—	DF	SRB	Stefan Veličković (from Partizán Bardejov)

Out: Note: Flags indicate national team as defined under FIFA eligibility rules; some limited exceptions apply. Players may hold more than one non-FIFA nationality.

No.	Pos.	Nation	Player
—	FW	SVK	Roland Černák (on loan to FK Slavoj Trebišov)
—	DF	SVK	Ján Hatok (on loan to 1. FC Tatran Prešov)

=== FC Rohožník ===
In: Note: Flags indicate national team as defined under FIFA eligibility rules; some limited exceptions apply. Players may hold more than one non-FIFA nationality.

No.	Pos.	Nation	Player
—	FW	SVK	Viktor Vondryska (from (Austria) SC Melk)
—	GK	SVK	Denis Chudý (on loan from FC Spartak Trnava)
—	MF	SVK	Roman Zemko (on loan from Partizán Bardejov)

Out: Note: Flags indicate national team as defined under FIFA eligibility rules; some limited exceptions apply. Players may hold more than one non-FIFA nationality.

No.	Pos.	Nation	Player
—	GK	CZE	Jakub Trefil (loan return to (Czech Republic) SK Sigma Olomouc)

=== MŠK Námestovo ===
In: Note: Flags indicate national team as defined under FIFA eligibility rules; some limited exceptions apply. Players may hold more than one non-FIFA nationality.

No.	Pos.	Nation	Player
—	GK	SVK	Jakub Novák (on loan from MFK Ružomberok)

Out: Note: Flags indicate national team as defined under FIFA eligibility rules; some limited exceptions apply. Players may hold more than one non-FIFA nationality.

No.	Pos.	Nation	Player
