= 2020–21 AS Trenčín season =

AS Trenčín
2020–21 season
- Owner: Tscheu La Ling
- Chairman: Róbert Rybníček
- Manager: Stijn Vreven (until 27 April); Juraj Ančic (interim); Peter Hlinka (from 2 June)
- Stadium: Štadión pod Dubňom; Štadión na Sihoti
- Fortuna liga: 6th
- Slovak Cup: Quarter-final
Home colours	Away colours

The 2020–21 AS Trenčín season is the club's 21st season in the Slovak Super Liga and 10th consecutive. AS Trenčín participated in the Fortuna Liga and Slovak Cup.

In pre-season club changes manager. Juraj Ančic was replaced by Stijn Vreven. In this season, after two and a half years AS Trenčín will return on a reconstructed home stadium Štadión na Sihoti. Autumn rounds of a league was played on Štadión pod Dubňom in a city Žilina. Spring matches will be played in Trenčín. On April 27 Stijn Vreven ended in AS Trenčín.

In this season AS changes club's logo. Previous logo missed historical value, reference to AS Trenčín's traditions and also right color combination. New edition contain letter "T" with dynamic design. New logo is connected with returning on the new stadium.

== Players ==
Note: Flags indicate national team as defined under FIFA eligibility rules; some limited exceptions apply. Players may hold more than one non-FIFA nationality.

No.	Pos.	Nation	Player
3	DF	BRA	Ramón
4	MF	NGR	Abdul Zubairu
5	DF	FRA	Steve Kapuadi
6	DF	SVK	Martin Šulek (Captain)
7	MF	BIH	Hamza Čataković
8	MF	SVK	Artur Gajdoš
9	FW	USA	Eduvie Ikoba
10	MF	CRO	Ante Roguljić
13	MF	NGR	Philip Azango
14	MF	BEL	Milan Corryn
15	FW	NGR	Ahmad Ghali (on loan from MFM)
16	FW	SVK	Jakub Kadák
17	FW	SVK	Lucas Demitra
18	MF	SVK	Samuel Lavrinčík
19	DF	CPV	Kelvin Pires
22	DF	SVK	Adrián Slávik

No.	Pos.	Nation	Player
23	MF	SVK	Adam Gaži
24	GK	SVK	Igor Šemrinec (Vice-captain)
27	DF	SVK	Simeon Kohut
28	FW	SVK	Matúš Kmeť
29	DF	NED	Ruben Ligeon
30	MF	GHA	Rahim Ibrahim
31	MF	CPV	Paulo Junior
32	FW	SVK	Lukáš Letenay
33	DF	SVK	Richard Križan
34	MF	NED	Aschraf El Mahdioui
35	DF	NGR	Reuben Yem
55	GK	NED	Menno Bergsen
66	DF	FIN	Juha Pirinen
71	FW	SVK	Adam Tučný
74	DF	SVK	Urban Mazanovský
99	GK	SVK	Michal Kukučka

== Transfers ==
=== Transfers in ===
Entry date	Position	No.	Player	From	Ref.
29 June 2020	DF	66	(Finland) Juha Pirinen	(Norway) Tromsø IL	
13 July 2020	FW	9	(United States) Eduvie Ikoba	(Hungary) Zalaegerszegi TE	
19 July 2020	MF	13	(Nigeria) Philip Azango	(Belgium) KAA Gent	
1 August 2020	DF	35	(Nigeria) Reuben Yem	(Belgium) KAA Gent	
19 December 2020	FW	28	(Slovakia) Matúš Kmeť	(Slovakia) MFK Ružomberok	
28 December 2020	MF	26	(Ghana) Joseph Amoah	(Portugal) Vitória S.C.	
28 December 2020	MF	30	(Ghana) Rahim Ibrahim	(Portugal) Vitória S.C.	
29 December 2020	MF	18	(Slovakia) Samuel Lavrinčík	(Slovakia) Slovan Bratislava U21	
30 December 2020	MF	23	(Slovakia) Adam Gaži	(Slovakia) AS Trenčín U19	
7 March 2021	DF	3	(Brazil) Ramón	(Austria) FC Wacker Innsbruck B	

=== Loans in ===
Date	Position	No.	Player	From	End date	Ref.
31 January 2020	FW	15	(Nigeria) Ahmad Ghali	(Nigeria) MFM FC	31 December 2020	

=== Transfers out ===
Date	Position	Player	To	Ref.
7 July 2020	DF	(Trinidad and Tobago) Keston Julien	(Moldova) FC Sheriff Tiraspol	
7 July 2020	MF	(Ghana) Mohammed Lamine	(Portugal) U.D. Oliveirense	
31 July 2020	GK	(Slovakia) Adrián Chovan	(Slovakia) FC ViOn Zlaté Moravce	
17 August 2020	FW	(Netherlands) Gino van Kessel	(Cyprus) Olympiakos Nicosia	
5 September 2020	FW	(Ghana) Osman Bukari	(Belgium) KAA Gent	
30 October 2020	DF	(England) Cole Kpekawa	(England) Chelmsford City F.C.	
17 December 2020	FW	(Slovakia) David Depetris	End of a contract	
17 December 2020	DF	(Slovakia) Marián Pišoja	End of a contract	
February 2021	FW	(Ghana) Joseph Amoah	No Club	

=== Loans out ===
Date	Position	Player	To	End date	Ref.
29 July 2020	FW	(Slovakia) Michal Petráš	(Slovakia) FK Dubnica	30 June 2021	
17 January 2021	MF	(Croatia) Tomislav Knežević	(Croatia) NK Rudeš	30 June 2021	
17 January 2021	FW	(Suriname) Ivenzo Comvalius	(Croatia) NK Dugopolje	30 June 2021	

== Friendlies ==
Win Draw Loss

=== Pre-season ===
25 July 2020	MŠK Žilina (Slovakia)	2–2	(Slovakia) AS Trenčín	Žilina
18:00 CEST (UTC+02:00)	50' Holáň; 89' (pen.) Kopas	Report	13' Roguljić; 21' Corryn	Stadium: Štadión pod Dubňom; Attendance: 100

1 August 2020	AS Trenčín (Slovakia)	0–3	(Slovakia) FK Pohronie	Mníchova Lehota
12:00 CEST (UTC+02:00)		Report	6' Weir; 54' Blahút; 74' (o.g.) Zubairu

1 August 2020	AS Trenčín (Slovakia)	2–5	(Czech Republic) FC Fastav Zlín	Mníchova Lehota
17:00 CEST (UTC+02:00)	8' Ghali; 48' Ikoba	Report	57' Conde; 58', 73' Jawo; 61' Chwaszcz; 75' Nečas

=== Mid-season ===
12 January 2021 Winter Tipsport Liga	FC Spartak Trnava (Slovakia)	1–0	(Slovakia) AS Trenčín	Trnava
13:00 CET (UTC+01:00)	28' (o.g.) Pirinen	Report		Stadium: Artificial turf Slávia

19 January 2021 Winter Tipsport Liga	AS Trenčín (Slovakia)	Cancelled	(Slovakia) FC ViOn Zlaté Moravce	Trnava
13:00 CET (UTC+01:00)				Stadium: Artificial turf Slávia
Note: The game was cancelled following an outbreak of COVID-19 cases among the ViOn Zlaté Moravce squad.

19 January 2021	Górnik Zabrze (Poland)	4–1	(Slovakia) AS Trenčín	Žilina
12:00 CET (UTC+01:00)	43' (pen.) Ściślak; 49' Kubica; 74', 84' Nowak	Report	4' Kmeť	Stadium: Štadión pod Dubňom

26 January 2021 Winter Tipsport Liga	MFK Skalica (Slovakia)	0–3	(Slovakia) AS Trenčín	Senec
13:00 CET (UTC+01:00)		Report	Demitra 53'; Kmeť 58'; Tučný 64'

29 January 2021	AS Trenčín (Slovakia)	2–3	(Slovakia) MFK Tatran Liptovský Mikuláš	Trenčín
14:00 CET (UTC+01:00)	Jakub Kadák 31', 44'		Voško 51'; Bartoš 60', 80'	Stadium: Štadión na Sihoti

30 January 2021	AS Trenčín (Slovakia)	1–1	(Slovakia) MŠK Púchov	Trenčín
14:00 CET (UTC+01:00)	Ghali 76'		Varga 36'	Stadium: Štadión na Sihoti

5 February 2021	AS Trenčín (Slovakia)	5–0	(Slovakia) FK Dubnica	Trenčín
15:30 CET (UTC+01:00)	Kadák 5', 53', 59'; Čataković 53'; Amoah 86'	Report		Stadium: Štadión na Sihoti

6 February 2021	AS Trenčín (Slovakia)	1–3	(Slovakia) FC ŠTK 1914 Šamorín	Trenčín
13:00 CET (UTC+01:00)	Ikoba 47' (pen.)	Report	Leginus 24'; Baéz 55', 76'	Stadium: Štadión na Sihoti

12 February 2021	AS Trenčín (Slovakia)	1–1	(Slovakia) FK Železiarne Podbrezová	Trenčín
14:00 CET (UTC+01:00)	Ghali 80'	Report	Micovčák 89'	Stadium: Štadión na Sihoti

19 February 2021	AS Trenčín (Slovakia)	1–0	(Slovakia) MŠK Žilina B	Trenčín
13:00 CET (UTC+01:00)	Gajdoš 85' (pen.)			Stadium: Štadión na Sihoti

== Competition overview ==
Competition	First match	Last match	Starting round	Final position	Record							
Competition	First match	Last match	Starting round	Final position	Pld	W	D	L	GF	GA	GD	Win %
Fortuna liga	8 August 2020	25 May 2021	Matchday 1	6th	33	8	8	17	42	63	−21	24.24
Slovak Cup	16 September 2020	13 April 2021	2nd round	Quarter-final	4	3	0	1	5	4	+1	75.00
Total					37	11	8	18	47	67	−20	29.73

Source: Competitions

== Fortuna Liga ==
=== Regular stage ===
==== League table ====
Pos	Team	Pld	W	D	L	GF	GA	GD	Pts	Qualification
3	Žilina	22	11	4	7	49	33	+16	37	Qualification for the championship group
4	Spartak Trnava	22	11	2	9	32	29	+3	35	Qualification for the championship group
5	Zlaté Moravce	22	9	6	7	38	29	+9	33	Qualification for the championship group
6	Trenčín	22	7	7	8	30	38	−8	28	Qualification for the championship group
7	Ružomberok	22	5	8	9	31	37	−6	23	Qualification for the relegation group
8	Nitra	22	6	4	12	21	38	−17	22	Qualification for the relegation group
9	Zemplín Michalovce	22	5	7	10	22	42	−20	22	Qualification for the relegation group

Source: Niké liga (in Slovak)
Rules for classification: 1) Points; 2) Head-to-head points; 3) Head-to-head goal difference; 4) Head-to-head away goals scored; 5) Play-off.

==== Results summary ====
Overall								Home						Away					
Pld	W	D	L	GF	GA	GD	Pts	W	D	L	GF	GA	GD	W	D	L	GF	GA	GD
22	7	7	8	30	37	−7	28	4	4	3	19	17	+2	3	3	5	11	20	−9

==== Results by round ====
Round	1	2	3	4	5	6	7	8	9	10	11	12	13	14	15	16	17	18	19	20	21	22
Ground	A	H	H	A	H	A	H	A	H	H	A	H	A	A	H	A	H	A	H	A	A	H
Result	D	D	L	P	L	D	W	L	L	D	L	W	L	L	W	L	D	W	D	W	W	W
Position	6	7	10	9	11	10	8	8	11	9	12	10	11	12	10	10	10	10	8	7	6	6

Source: Futbalnet
A = Away; H = Home; W = Win; D = Draw; L = Loss; P = Postponed

==== Matches ====
8 August 2020 1	MFK Ružomberok	2–2	AS Trenčín	Ružomberok
19:00 CEST (UTC+02:00)	86' (pen.) Ján Maslo; 90' Brenkus	Report	6', 33' Ikoba; (yellow card) (yellow-red card) 67' Kapuadi	Stadium: Štadión pod Čebraťom; Attendance: 1,232; Referee: Kristián Micheľ

12 August 2020 2	AS Trenčín	1–1	FC ViOn Zlaté Moravce	Žilina
19:00 CEST (UTC+02:00)	88' Čataković	Report	62' Balaj	Stadium: Štadión pod Dubňom; Attendance: 196; Referee: Ivan Kružliak

15 August 2020 3	AS Trenčín	2–4	MŠK Žilina	Žilina
18:00 CEST (UTC+02:00)	45' (pen.) Čataković; 75' Bukari	Report	7' Paur; 51' Iľko; 85' Kaprálik; 90' (pen.) Bichakhchyan	Stadium: Štadión pod Dubňom; Attendance: 1,210; Referee: Ivan Kružliak

31 August 2020 5	AS Trenčín	1–2	ŠK Slovan Bratislava	Žilina
19:00 CEST (UTC+02:00)	23' (o.g.) Medveděv	Report	44', 70' De Marco	Stadium: Štadión pod Dubňom; Attendance: 982; Referee: Peter Kráľovič

12 September 2020 6	MFK Zemplín Michalovce	1–1	AS Trenčín	Michalovce
19:00 CEST (UTC+02:00)	83' Phillips	Report	40' Čataković	Stadium: Mestský futbalový štadión Attendance: 312; Referee: Erik Gemzický

19 September 2020 7	AS Trenčín	3–2	FC Nitra	Žilina
19:00 CEST (UTC+02:00)	11' Ligeon; 22' Ghali; 56' Čataković	Report	32' Podhorin; 76' Faško	Stadium: Štadión pod Dubňom; Attendance: 129; Referee: Peter Ziemba

22 September 2020 4	ŠKF Sereď	1–1	AS Trenčín	Zlaté Moravce
19:00 CEST (UTC+02:00)	63' Djiby Ba	Report	22' Roguljić	Stadium: Štadión FC ViOn; Attendance: 261; Referee: Maroš Libiak

26 September 2020 8	FC DAC 1904 Dunajská Streda	3–1	AS Trenčín	Dunajská Streda
19:00 CEST (UTC+02:00)	30' Kalmár; 36', 62' Divković	Report	15' Roguljić; (penalty missed) 33' Čataković; (yellow card) (yellow-red card) 61' Zubairu	Stadium: MOL Aréna; Attendance: 1,000; Referee: Michal Smolák

4 October 2020 9	AS Trenčín	0–1	FK Senica	Žilina
19:00 CEST (UTC+02:00)		Report	67' Yenne	Stadium: Štadión pod Dubňom; Attendance: 0 Referee: Filip Glova

17 October 2020 10	AS Trenčín	1–1	FK Pohronie	Žilina
17:00 CEST (UTC+02:00)	26' El Mahdioui	Report	58' Weir	Stadium: Štadión pod Dubňom; Attendance: 0 Referee: Adam Somoláni

24 October 2020 11	FC Spartak Trnava	2–0	AS Trenčín	Trnava
17:00 CEST (UTC+02:00)	79' (pen.) Pačínda; 89' Kóša	Report		Stadium: Štadión Antona Malatinského; Attendance: 0 Referee: Peter Ziemba

1 November 2020 12	AS Trenčín	3–1	MFK Ružomberok	Žilina
17:00 CET (UTC+01:00)	20' (o.g.) Maslo; 68' (o.g.) Čurma; 87' Kadák	Report	90' Maslo	Stadium: Štadión pod Dubňom; Attendance: 0 Referee: Pavol Ochotnický

7 November 2020 13	FC ViOn Zlaté Moravce	5–0	AS Trenčín	Zlaté Moravce
17:00 CET (UTC+01:00)	22', 62', 83' Balaj; 25' Kovaľ; 53' Hrnčár	Report		Stadium: Štadión FC ViOn; Attendance: 0 Referee: Filip Glova

21 November 2020 14	MŠK Žilina	2–0	AS Trenčín	Žilina
14:00 CET (UTC+01:00)	15' Bernát; 59' Kurminowski	Report		Stadium: Štadión pod Dubňom; Attendance: 0 Referee: Dušan Sedlák

29 November 2020 15	AS Trenčín	1–0	ŠKF Sereď	Žilina
14:00 CET (UTC+01:00)	15' (o.g.) Adekuoroye	Report		Stadium: Štadión pod Dubňom; Attendance: 0 Referee: Erik Gemzický

5 December 2020 16	ŠK Slovan Bratislava	2–0	AS Trenčín	Bratislava
17:00 CET (UTC+01:00)	21' (pen.), 90' Holman	Report	(red card) 82' El Mahdioui	Stadium: Tehelné pole Attendance: 0 Referee: Michal Očenáš

13 December 2020 17	AS Trenčín	2–2	MFK Zemplín Michalovce	Žilina
14:00 CET (UTC+01:00)	82' Tučný; 85' Corryn	Report	12', 22' Taiwo	Stadium: Štadión pod Dubňom; Attendance: 0 Referee: Dušan Sedlák

16 December 2020 18	FC Nitra	1–2	AS Trenčín	Nitra
14:00 CET (UTC+01:00)	Mustafić 73'	Report	Zubairu 60'; Čataković 87'	Stadium: Štadión pod Zoborom; Attendance: 0 Referee: Filip Glova

14 February 2021 19	AS Trenčín	3–3	FC DAC 1904 Dunajská Streda	Trenčín
15:00 CET (UTC+01:00)	Kadák 26'; Demitra 29'; Čataković 70'	Report	Nicolaescu 56'; Kalmár 61' (pen.); Ramírez 90+5' (pen.)	Stadium: Štadión na Sihoti; Attendance: 0 Referee: Ivan Kružliak

20 February 2020 20	FK Senica	2–3	AS Trenčín	Senica
14:00 CET (UTC+01:00)	Košťál 12'; Kapuadi 77' (o.g.)	Report	Čataković 37' (pen.); Corryn 67'; Šimčák 78' (o.g.)	Stadium: OMS Arena Senica; Attendance: 0 Referee: Marek Mastiš

27 February 2020 21	FK Pohronie	0–1	AS Trenčín	Žiar nad Hronom
14:00 CET (UTC+01:00)		Report	Čataković 85'	Stadium: Mestský štadión Žiar nad Hronom; Attendance: 0 Referee: Peter Kráľovič

6 March 2020 22	AS Trenčín	2–0	FC Spartak Trnava	Trenčín
14:00 CET (UTC+01:00)	Čataković 21'; Ikoba 89'	Report		Stadium: Štadión na Sihoti; Attendance: 0 Referee: Ladislav Prešinský

=== Championship group ===
==== League table ====
Pos	Team	Pld	W	D	L	GF	GA	GD	Pts	Qualification	SLO	DAC	TRN	ŽIL	ZLM	TRE
1	Slovan Bratislava (C)	32	22	5	5	78	28	+50	71	Qualification for the Champions League first qualifying round	—	0–1	1–2	2–2	4–1	2–1
2	DAC Dunajská Streda	32	19	8	5	66	38	+28	65	Qualification for the Europa Conference League second qualifying round	2–2	—	2–0	2–1	2–0	2–0
3	Spartak Trnava	32	17	4	11	48	37	+11	55	Qualification for the Europa Conference League first qualifying round	3–0	3–2	—	1–1	3–0	2–0
4	Žilina	32	15	7	10	73	52	+21	52	Qualification for the Europa Conference League play-offs	2–3	3–3	2–1	—	5–1	5–3
5	Zlaté Moravce	32	11	7	14	42	51	−9	40	Qualification for the Europa Conference League play-offs	0–4	0–1	0–0	1–0	—	1–0
6	Trenčín	32	8	8	16	42	61	−19	32	Qualification for the Europa Conference League play-offs	2–6	1–1	0–1	2–3	3–0	—

Source: Niké liga (in Slovak)
Legend: Blue = home team win; Yellow = draw; Red = away team win.
Rules for classification: 1) Points; 2) Head-to-head points; 3) Head-to-head goal difference; 4) Head-to-head away goals scored; 5) Play-off.
(C) Champions

==== Results summary ====
Overall								Home						Away					
Pld	W	D	L	GF	GA	GD	Pts	W	D	L	GF	GA	GD	W	D	L	GF	GA	GD
10	1	1	8	12	23	−11	4	1	1	3	8	11	−3	0	0	5	4	12	−8

==== Results by round ====
Round	1	2	3	4	5	6	7	8	9	10
Ground	H	A	H	H	A	A	H	A	H	A
Result	L	L	L	L	L	L	W	L	D	L
Position	6	6	6	6	6	6	6	6	6	6

Source: Futbalnet
A = Away; H = Home; W = Win; D = Draw; L = Loss; P = Postponed

==== Matches ====
14 March 2021 1	AS Trenčín	2–6	ŠK Slovan Bratislava	Trenčín
16:00 CET (UTC+01:00)	Demitra 28'; Corryn 42'; Zubairu (yellow card) 30' (yellow-red card) 76'		Moha 14', 27'; Čavrić 62'; Henty 71'; Ratão 82' (pen.); Ožbolt 89'	Stadium: Štadión na Sihoti; Attendance: 0 Referee: Erik Gemzický

20 March 2021 2	FC ViOn Zlaté Moravce	1–0	AS Trenčín	Zlaté Moravce
17:00 CET (UTC+01:00)	Ramón 64' (o.g.)	Report		Stadium: Štadión FC ViOn; Attendance: 0 Referee: Kristián Micheľ

3 April 2021 3	AS Trenčín	0–1	FC Spartak Trnava	Trenčín
17:00 CEST (UTC+02:00)		Report	Ristovski 76' (pen.)	Stadium: Štadión na Sihoti; Attendance: 0 Referee: Marián Ruc

10 April 2021 4	AS Trenčín	2–3	MŠK Žilina	Trenčín
15:30 CEST (UTC+02:00)	Čataković 45' (pen.); Ghali 79'	Report	Lavrinčík 6' (o.g.); Kurminowski 21'; Kaprálik 59'	Stadium: Štadión na Sihoti; Attendance: 0 Referee: Boris Marhefka

17 April 2021 5	FC DAC 1904 Dunajská Streda	2–0	AS Trenčín	Dunajská Streda
17:00 CEST (UTC+02:00)	Ramírez 8'; Divković 21'	Report		Stadium: MOL Aréna; Attendance: 0 Referee: Bálint Kišš

24 April 2021 6	FC Spartak Trnava	2–0	AS Trenčín	Trnava
17:00 CEST (UTC+02:00)	Yusuf 7'; Ristovski 13'	Report		Stadium: Štadión Antona Malatinského; Attendance: 0 Referee: Marek Mastiš

1 May 2021 7	AS Trenčín	3–0	FC ViOn Zlaté Moravce	Trenčín
17:00 CEST (UTC+02:00)	Pirinen 28'; Ahmad Ghali 50', 85'	Report		Stadium: Štadión na Sihoti; Attendance: 0 Referee: Kristián Micheľ

8 May 2021 8	MŠK Žilina	5–3	AS Trenčín	Žilina
17:00 CEST (UTC+02:00)	Ďuriš 5'; Kurminowski 49', 61'; Kiwior 69'; Goljan 76'	Report	Aschraf El Mahdioui (yellow card) 24' (yellow-red card) 56'; Ikoba 32' (pen.); Čataković 80', 88'	Stadium: Štadión pod Dubňom; Attendance: 0 Referee: Bálint Kišš

15 May 2021 9	AS Trenčín	1–1	FC DAC 1904 Dunajská Streda	Trenčín
18:00 CEST (UTC+02:00)	Corryn 90+1'	Report	Beskorovainyi 58'	Stadium: Štadión na Sihoti; Attendance: 0 Referee: Michal Smolák

22 May 2021 10	ŠK Slovan Bratislava	2–1	AS Trenčín	Bratislava
19:00 CEST (UTC+02:00)	Holman 5'; Lichý 7'	Report	Lavrinčík 80'	Stadium: Tehelné pole Attendance: 500; Referee: Michal Očenáš

=== Europa Conference League play-offs ===
==== Semi-final ====
25 May 2021	FC ViOn Zlaté Moravce	0–2	AS Trenčín	Zlaté Moravce
19:00 CEST (UTC+02:00)		Report	Balaj 51'; Švec 57'	Stadium: Štadión FC ViOn; Attendance: 217; Referee: Peter Kráľovič

== Slovak Cup ==
16 September 2020 2nd round	Spartak Myjava (3)	0–2	AS Trenčín	Myjava
19:30 CEST (UTC+02:00)		Report	30' (o.g.) Koníček; 86' Ikoba	Stadium: Stadium Myjava; Attendance: 352; Referee: Ivan Kružliak

30 September 2020 3rd round	TJ Družstevník Radimov (4)	1–2	AS Trenčín	Radimov
15:30 CEST (UTC+02:00)	66' Šebesta; (yellow card) (yellow-red card) 89' Šefčovič	Report	65', 77' Kadák	Attendance: 420; Referee: Tomáš Marsal

4th round	MŠK Spišské Podhradie (3)	Cancelled (Note: Due the COVID-19 pandemic organizers make changes in a format of the 2020–21 Slovak Cup. AS Trenčín promote to the Round of 16.)	AS Trenčín	Spišské Podhradie

6 April 2021 Round of 16	FC Spartak Trnava (1)	0–1	AS Trenčín	Topoľčany
11:00 CEST (UTC+02:00)		Report	Corryn 57'	Referee: Adam Somoláni

13 April 2021 Quarter-final	FC Košice (2)	3–0	AS Trenčín	Košice
13:30 CEST (UTC+02:00)	Gáll 18'; Pačinda 70'; Liener 80'	Report		Stadium: Štadión Lokomotívy; Attendance: 0 Referee: Erik Gemzický

== Statistics ==
=== Appearances and goals ===
- Italics indicate a loaned player

No.	Pos	Nat	Player	Total		Fortuna Liga		Slovak Cup	
No.	Pos	Nat	Player	Apps	Goals	Apps	Goals	Apps	Goals
Goalkeepers
24	GK	(Slovakia) SVK	Igor Šemrinec	19	0	17	0	2	0
55	GK	(Netherlands) NED	Menno Bergsen	4	0	4	0	0	0
99	GK	(Slovakia) SVK	Michal Kukučka	14	0	12	0	2	0
Defenders
3	DF	(Brazil) BRA	Ramón	8	0	5+1	0	2	0
5	DF	(France) FRA	Steve Kapuadi	16	0	14	0	2	0
6	DF	(Slovakia) SVK	Martin Šulek	28	0	25+1	0	2	0
13	DF	(Nigeria) NGR	Kingsley Madu	4	0	3+1	0	0	0
19	DF	(Cape Verde) CPV	Kelvin Pires	2	0	0+2	0	0	0
22	DF	(Slovakia) SVK	Adrián Slávik	13	0	10+2	0	1	0
29	DF	(Netherlands) NED	Ruben Ligeon	17	1	12+3	1	2	0
33	DF	(Slovakia) SVK	Richard Križan	26	0	23+1	0	2	0
35	DF	(Nigeria) NGR	Reuben Yem	19	0	13+4	0	1+1	0
66	DF	(Finland) FIN	Juha Pirinen	29	1	25	1	4	0
74	DF	(Slovakia) SVK	Urban Mazanovský	4	0	2+2	0	0	0
Midfielders
4	MF	(Nigeria) NGR	Abdul Zubairu	30	1	18+8	1	2+2	0
7	MF	(Bosnia and Herzegovina) BIH	Hamza Čataković	31	12	18+9	12	4	0
8	MF	(Slovakia) SVK	Artur Gajdoš	10	0	1+7	0	0+2	0
10	MF	(Croatia) CRO	Ante Roguljić	18	2	15+1	2	2	0
11	MF	(Nigeria) NGR	Philip Azango	4	0	3+1	0	0	0
14	MF	(Belgium) BEL	Milan Corryn	31	5	18+9	4	3+1	1
18	MF	(Slovakia) SVK	Samuel Lavrinčík	11	0	4+6	0	0+1	0
23	MF	(Slovakia) SVK	Adam Gaži	15	0	7+8	0	0	0
34	MF	(Netherlands) NED	Aschraf El Mahdioui	33	1	29	1	4	0
Forwards
9	FW	(United States) USA	Eduvie Ikoba	29	6	13+13	5	0+3	1
12	FW	(Suriname) SUR	Ivenzo Comvalius	7	0	0+6	0	1	0
15	FW	(Nigeria) NGR	Ahmad Ghali	32	4	24+5	4	3	0
16	FW	(Slovakia) SVK	Jakub Kadák	34	4	24+6	2	4	2
17	FW	(Slovakia) SVK	Lucas Demitra	5	2	5	2	0	0
28	FW	(Slovakia) SVK	Matúš Kmeť	6	0	5	0	1	0
32	FW	(Slovakia) SVK	Lukáš Letenay	7	0	2+4	0	0+1	0
71	FW	(Slovakia) SVK	Adam Tučný	19	1	6+10	1	0+3	0
Players transferred out during the season
11	FW	(Ghana) GHA	Osman Bukari	6	1	2+2	1	0+2	0
77	FW	(Slovakia) SVK	David Depetris	9	0	3+6	0	0	0

=== Goalscorers ===
Rank	No.	Pos.	Name	Fortuna Liga	Slovak Cup	Total
1	7	MF	(Bosnia and Herzegovina) Hamza Čataković	12	0	12
2	9	FW	(United States) Eduvie Ikoba	5	1	3
2	14	MF	(Belgium) Milan Corryn	4	1	3
4	15	FW	(Nigeria) Ahmad Ghali	4	0	4
4	16	FW	(Slovakia) Jakub Kadák	2	2	4
6	10	MF	(Croatia) Ante Roguljić	2	0	2
6	17	FW	(Slovakia) Lucas Demitra	2	0	2
8	34	MF	(Netherlands) Aschraf El Mahdioui	1	0	1
8	4	MF	(Nigeria) Abdul Zubairu	1	0	1
8	11	FW	(Nigeria) Osman Bukari	1	0	1
8	29	DF	(Netherlands) Ruben Ligeon	1	0	1
8	66	DF	(Finland) Juha Pirinen	1	0	1
8	71	FW	(Slovakia) Adam Tučný	1	0	1
Own goals				3	0	2
Totals				38	3	41
