= 2020–21 FC Spartak Trnava season =

FC Spartak Trnava
2020–21 season
- Manager: Marián Šarmír (until 14 September 2020); Norbert Hrnčár (14 September 2020 – 31 December 2020); Michal Gašparík (since 1 January 2021)
- Stadium: Anton Malatinský Stadium
- Fortuna liga: 3rd
- Slovak Cup: Round of 16
Home colours	Away colours

The 2020–21 FC Spartak Trnava season is the club's 27th season in the Slovak Super Liga and 19th consecutive. Spartak participated in the Fortuna Liga and Slovak Cup.

Club changes coach after 6 rounds of the league. Marián Šarmír ended after 3 months of his work in Spartak. Norbert Hrnčár began in 14 September and ended in the end of the year 2020. A new coach Michal Gašparík started after a winter break of the league in first 2021's training.

== Players ==
Note: Flags indicate national team as defined under FIFA eligibility rules; some limited exceptions apply. Players may hold more than one non-FIFA nationality.

No.	Pos.	Nation	Player
1	GK	SVK	Ľuboš Kamenár
2	DF	SVK	Matúš Turňa
3	DF	SVK	Gergely Tumma
5	DF	SLO	Dejan Trajkovski
6	DF	NGR	Izuchuckwu Anthony
7	FW	MKD	Milan Ristovski (on loan from Rijeka)
8	MF	SVK	Jakub Grič
11	FW	SVK	Sebastián Gembický
13	DF	SVK	Marek Ujlaky
14	MF	NGR	Johnson Nsumoh
17	MF	SVK	Peter Kolesár
18	DF	SVK	Lukáš Jendrek
19	MF	ESP	Dani Iglesias (on loan from Rijeka)
20	DF	GRE	Marios Tsaousis (on loan from PAOK)
21	MF	CIV	Yann Yao

No.	Pos.	Nation	Player
22	MF	SVK	Samuel Benovič
23	DF	CZE	Filip Twardzik
24	DF	SVK	Kristián Koštrna
25	FW	NGR	Bamidele Yusuf
26	DF	SVK	Sebastian Kóša
28	MF	SVK	Martin Bukata
29	MF	SVK	Martin Mikovič
31	GK	SVK	Dobrivoj Rusov (captain)
33	MF	SVK	Ján Vlasko
45	FW	SVK	Stanislav Olejník
71	GK	SVK	Dominik Takáč
79	MF	BRA	Saymon Cabral (on loan from Avaí)
81	MF	BRA	Allecks Godinho
88	MF	GRE	Kyriakos Savvidis

== Friendlies ==
Win Draw Loss

=== Pre-season ===
25 July 2020	FC Spartak Trnava (Slovakia)	1–1	(Slovakia) FK Pohronie	Priechod
16:00 CEST (UTC+02:00)	Grič 40'	Report	Weir

25 July 2020	FC Spartak Trnava (Slovakia)	2–0	(Slovakia) FK Poprad	Priechod
18:00 CEST (UTC+02:00)	Gembický 14'; Olejník 18'	Report

1 August 2020	Sigma Olomouc (Czech Republic)	1–1	(Slovakia) FC Spartak Trnava	Rakvice
17:00 CEST (UTC+02:00)	Zifčák 58'	Report	Pačinda 82' (pen.)

=== Mid-season ===
==== Tipsport Malta Cup ====
Spartak Trnava was on the third edition of the Tipsport Cup played on National Stadium Ta' Qali in Malta. The tournament was taken place from 3 January to 10 January. Participants were also Sigma Olomouc, Zbrojovka Brno and WSG Swarovski Tirol. All teams were played two matches.

6 January 2021 Semi-final	FC Spartak Trnava (Slovakia)	1–2	(Czech Republic) Sigma Olomouc	Ta' Qali, Malta
18:00 CET	Kotlár 84'	Report	Daněk 57'; Radič 89'	Stadium: Grawnd Nazzjonali

9 January 2021 Third place play-off	FC Spartak Trnava (Slovakia)	0–1	(Czech Republic) Zbrojovka Brno	Ta' Qali, Malta
14:00 CET		Report	Fousek 29' (pen.)	Stadium: Grawnd Nazzjonali

==== Winter Tipsport Liga ====
Spartak Trnava was also invited on the Czech-Slovak winter Tipsport Liga. Slovak group "C" was organized by Spartak on the artificial turf Slávia.

12 January 2021	FC Spartak Trnava (Slovakia)	1–0	(Slovakia) AS Trenčín	Trnava
13:00 CET (UTC+01:00)	28' (o.g.) Pirinen	Report		Stadium: Artificial turf Slávia

16 January 2021	FC Spartak Trnava (Slovakia)	Cancelled	(Slovakia) FC ViOn Zlaté Moravce	Trnava
13:00 CET (UTC+01:00)				Stadium: Artificial turf Slávia
Note: The game was cancelled following an outbreak of COVID-19 cases among the ViOn Zlaté Moravce squad.

19 January 2021	FC Spartak Trnava (Slovakia)	2–2	(Slovakia) MFK Skalica	Trnava
13:00 CET (UTC+01:00)	Olejník 28'; Benovič 31'	Report	Šebesta 51'; Nemergut 75'	Stadium: Artificial turf Slávia

==== End of the Mid-season ====
23 January 2021	Wisła Kraków (Poland)	Cancelled	(Slovakia) FC Spartak Trnava	Kraków, Poland
13:00 CET (UTC+01:00)
Note: The game was cancelled following an outbreak of COVID-19 cases among the Spartak Trnava squad.

30 January 2021	FC Spartak Trnava (Slovakia)	1–1	(Slovakia) MFK Dukla Banská Bystrica	Trnava
CET (UTC+01:00)	Bukata 35'	Report	Vujošević 84'

== Competition overview ==
Competition	First match	Last match	Starting round	Final position	Record							
Competition	First match	Last match	Starting round	Final position	Pld	W	D	L	GF	GA	GD	Win %
Fortuna liga	8 August 2020	22 May 2021	Matchday 1	Matchday 32	32	17	4	11	48	37	+11	53.13
Slovak Cup	2 September 2020	6 April 2021	2nd round	Round of 16	3	2	0	1	13	2	+11	66.67
Total					35	19	4	12	61	39	+22	54.29

Source: Competitions

== Fortuna liga ==
=== Regular stage ===
==== League table ====
Pos	Team	Pld	W	D	L	GF	GA	GD	Pts	Qualification
1	Slovan Bratislava	22	17	3	2	54	12	+42	54	Qualification for the championship group
2	DAC Dunajská Streda	22	13	5	4	48	28	+20	44	Qualification for the championship group
3	Žilina	22	11	4	7	49	33	+16	37	Qualification for the championship group
4	Spartak Trnava	22	11	2	9	32	29	+3	35	Qualification for the championship group
5	Zlaté Moravce	22	9	6	7	38	29	+9	33	Qualification for the championship group
6	Trenčín	22	7	7	8	30	38	−8	28	Qualification for the championship group
7	Ružomberok	22	5	8	9	31	37	−6	23	Qualification for the relegation group

Source: Niké liga (in Slovak)
Rules for classification: 1) Points; 2) Head-to-head points; 3) Head-to-head goal difference; 4) Head-to-head away goals scored; 5) Play-off.

==== Results summary ====
Overall								Home						Away					
Pld	W	D	L	GF	GA	GD	Pts	W	D	L	GF	GA	GD	W	D	L	GF	GA	GD
23	12	2	9	34	29	+5	38	6	1	5	13	14	−1	6	1	4	21	15	+6

==== Results by round ====
Round	1	2	3	4	5	6	7	8	9	10	11	12	13	14	15	16	17	18	19	20	21	22
Ground	A	H	H	A	H	A	H	A	H	A	H	H	A	A	H	A	H	A	H	A	H	A
Result	W	W	D	L	L	L	W	W	L	L	W	L	W	D	L	W	L	W	W	W	W	L
Position	4	3	2	3	5	6	5	3	5	5	4	6	5	4	6	5	5	4	4	4	3	4

Source: Futbalnet
A = Away; H = Home; W = Win; D = Draw; L = Loss; P = Postponed

==== Matches ====
8 August 2020 1	MFK Zemplín Michalovce	0–2	FC Spartak Trnava	Michalovce
19:00 CEST (UTC+02:00)		Report	Yao 1'; Vlasko 43'	Stadium: Mestský futbalový štadión Attendance: 1,439; Referee: Michal Očenáš

11 August 2020 2	FC Spartak Trnava	3–1	MFK Ružomberok	Trnava
18:00 CEST (UTC+02:00)	Vlasko 7' (pen.); Grič 55'; Pačinda 90'	Report	Maslo 81' (pen.)	Stadium: Anton Malatinský Stadium; Attendance: 3,346; Referee: Michal Smolák

15 August 2020 3	FC Spartak Trnava	1–1	FK Pohronie	Trnava
19:00 CEST (UTC+02:00)	Tumma 10'	Report	Bimenyimana 60'	Stadium: Anton Malatinský Stadium; Attendance: 3,854; Referee: Peter Ziemba

22 August 2020 4	FC DAC 1904 Dunajská Streda	2–1	FC Spartak Trnava	Dunajská Streda
18:00 CEST (UTC+02:00)	Ramírez 26', 70'	Report	Pačinda 43'	Stadium: MOL Aréna; Attendance: 6,297; Referee: Michal Očenáš

29 August 2020 5	FC Spartak Trnava	0–2	ŠKF Sereď	Trnava
19:00 CEST (UTC+02:00)		Report	Bušnja 31'; Iván 76'	Stadium: Anton Malatinský Stadium; Attendance: 2,833; Referee: Boris Marhefka

12 September 2020 6	ŠK Slovan Bratislava	2–0	FC Spartak Trnava	Bratislava
18:30 CEST (UTC+02:00)	Medved 13'; Nono 22'	Report		Stadium: Tehelné pole Attendance: 258; Referee: Filip Glova

19 September 2020 7	FC Spartak Trnava	1–0	FC ViOn Zlaté Moravce	Trnava
19:00 CEST (UTC+02:00)	Pačinda 63' (pen.)	Report		Stadium: Anton Malatinský Stadium; Attendance: 783; Referee: Michal Smolák

26 September 2020 8	FK Senica	0–2	FC Spartak Trnava	Senica
18:00 CEST (UTC+02:00)		Report	Bukata 40'; Cabral 70'	Stadium: OMS ARENA Senica; Attendance: 922; Referee: Ivan Kružliak

3 October 2020 9	FC Spartak Trnava	0–2	FC Nitra	Trnava
19:00 CEST (UTC+02:00)		Report	Adamec 45'; Chobot 66'	Stadium: Anton Malatinský Stadium; Attendance: 0 Referee: Dušan Sedlák

17 October 2020 10	MŠK Žilina	2–1	FC Spartak Trnava	Žilina
17:00 CEST (UTC+02:00)	Bichakhchyan 5'; Gamboš 71'	Report	Mikovič 50'	Stadium: Štadión pod Dubňom; Attendance: 0 Referee: Filip Glova

24 October 2020 11	FC Spartak Trnava	2–0	AS Trenčín	Trnava
17:00 CEST (UTC+02:00)	Pačínda 79' (pen.); Kóša 89'	Report		Stadium: Anton Malatinský Stadium; Attendance: 0 Referee: Peter Ziemba

31 October 2020 12	FC Spartak Trnava	1–2	MFK Zemplín Michalovce	Trnava
17:00 CET (UTC+01:00)	Vlasko 90'	Report	Taiwo 48', 64'	Stadium: Anton Malatinský Stadium; Attendance: 0 Referee: Erik Gemzický

7 November 2020 13	MFK Ružomberok	0–1	FC Spartak Trnava	Ružomberok
17:00 CET (UTC+01:00)		Report	Yusuf 63'	Stadium: Štadión pod Čebraťom; Attendance: 0 Referee: Ivan Kružliak

21 November 2020 14	FK Pohronie	3–3	FC Spartak Trnava	Žiar nad Hronom
14:00 CET (UTC+01:00)	Weir 17'; Petrák 69'; Bimenyimana 81'	Report	Yao 51'; Vlasko 61'; Savvidis 90'	Stadium: Mestský štadión Žiar nad Hronom; Attendance: 0 Referee: Michal Smolák

28 November 2020 15	FC Spartak Trnava	0–2	FC DAC 1904 Dunajská Streda	Trnava
16:15 CET (UTC+01:00)		Report	Ramírez 56'; Nicolaescu 60'	Stadium: Anton Malatinský Stadium; Attendance: 0 Referee: Ivan Kružliak

5 December 2020 16	ŠKF Sereď	2–6	FC Spartak Trnava	Zlaté Moravce
14:00 CET (UTC+01:00)	Adekuoroye (yellow card) (yellow-red card) 45'; Pankarićan 76', 89'	Report	Cabral 5', 45'; Adekuoroye 10' (o.g.); Michalík 43' (o.g.); Yusuf 69'; Tumma (yellow card) (yellow-red card) 75'; Pačinda 88'	Stadium: Štadión FC ViOn; Attendance: 0 Referee: Michal Smolák

13 December 2020 17	FC Spartak Trnava	0–3	ŠK Slovan Bratislava	Trnava
15:00 CET (UTC+01:00)		Report	Holman 17' (pen.); Strelec 33'; Abena (red card) 45+5'; Rabiu 84'	Stadium: Anton Malatinský Stadium; Attendance: 0 Referee: Filip Glova

6 February 2021 18	FC ViOn Zlaté Moravce	2–4	FC Spartak Trnava	Zlaté Moravce
14:00 CET (UTC+01:00)	Hrnčár 12'; Kyziridis 30'	Report	Bukata 25', 37'; Yusuf 45'; Twardzik 48' (pen.)	Stadium: Štadión FC ViOn; Attendance: 0 Referee: Peter Ziemba

13 February 2021 19	FC Spartak Trnava	1–0	FK Senica	Trnava
14:00 CET (UTC+01:00)	Mikovič 52'	Report		Stadium: Anton Malatinský Stadium; Attendance: 0 Referee: Michal Očenáš

20 February 2021 20	FC Nitra	0–1	FC Spartak Trnava	Nitra
15:00 CET (UTC+01:00)		Report	Savvidis 79'	Stadium: Štadión pod Zoborom; Attendance: 0 Referee: Martin Dohál

27 February 2021 21	FC Spartak Trnava	2–1	MŠK Žilina	Trnava
17:00 CET (UTC+01:00)	Yusuf 15', 30'; Koštrna (red card) 58'	Report	Javorček 40'	Stadium: Anton Malatinský Stadium; Attendance: 0 Referee: Boris Marhefka

6 March 2020 22	AS Trenčín	2–0	FC Spartak Trnava	Trenčín
14:00 CET (UTC+01:00)	Čataković 21'; Ikoba 89'	Report		Stadium: Štadión na Sihoti; Attendance: 0 Referee: Ladislav Prešinský

=== Championship group ===
==== League table ====
Pos	Team	Pld	W	D	L	GF	GA	GD	Pts	Qualification	SLO	DAC	TRN	ŽIL	ZLM	TRE
1	Slovan Bratislava (C)	32	22	5	5	78	28	+50	71	Qualification for the Champions League first qualifying round	—	0–1	1–2	2–2	4–1	2–1
2	DAC Dunajská Streda	32	19	8	5	66	38	+28	65	Qualification for the Europa Conference League second qualifying round	2–2	—	2–0	2–1	2–0	2–0
3	Spartak Trnava	32	17	4	11	48	37	+11	55	Qualification for the Europa Conference League first qualifying round	3–0	3–2	—	1–1	3–0	2–0
4	Žilina	32	15	7	10	73	52	+21	52	Qualification for the Europa Conference League play-offs	2–3	3–3	2–1	—	5–1	5–3
5	Zlaté Moravce	32	11	7	14	42	51	−9	40	Qualification for the Europa Conference League play-offs	0–4	0–1	0–0	1–0	—	1–0
6	Trenčín	32	8	8	16	42	61	−19	32	Qualification for the Europa Conference League play-offs	2–6	1–1	0–1	2–3	3–0	—

Source: Niké liga (in Slovak)
Legend: Blue = home team win; Yellow = draw; Red = away team win.
Rules for classification: 1) Points; 2) Head-to-head points; 3) Head-to-head goal difference; 4) Head-to-head away goals scored; 5) Play-off.
(C) Champions

==== Results summary ====
Overall								Home						Away					
Pld	W	D	L	GF	GA	GD	Pts	W	D	L	GF	GA	GD	W	D	L	GF	GA	GD
9	6	1	2	16	8	+8	19	4	1	0	12	3	+9	2	0	2	4	5	−1

==== Results by round ====
Round	1	2	3	4	5	6	7	8	9	10
Ground	A	H	A	H	A	H	H	A	H	A
Result	L	W	W	W	W	W	W	D	D	L
Position	4	4	4	4	3	3	3	3	3	3

Source: Futbalnet
A = Away; H = Home; W = Win; D = Draw; L = Loss; P = Postponed

==== Matches ====
13 March 2021 1	MŠK Žilina	2–1	FC Spartak Trnava	Žilina
18:30 CET (UTC+01:00)	Jibril 88'; Twardzik 90+6' (o.g.)	Report	Cabral 49'; Jendrek (yellow card) (yellow-red card) 90+3'	Stadium: Štadión pod Dubňom; Attendance: 0 Referee: Adam Somoláni

21 March 2021 2	FC Spartak Trnava	3–2	FC DAC 1904 Dunajská Streda	Trnava
16:00 CET (UTC+01:00)	Cabral 49'; Yusuf 66'; Ristovski 90+3'	Report	Ramírez 45+1'; Taiwo 85'	Stadium: Štadión Antona Malatinského; Attendance: 0 Referee: Erik Gemzický

3 April 2021 3	AS Trenčín	0–1	FC Spartak Trnava	Trenčín
17:00 CEST (UTC+02:00)		Report	Ristovski 76' (pen.)	Stadium: Štadión na Sihoti; Attendance: 0 Referee: Marián Ruc

10 April 2021 4	FC Spartak Trnava	3–0	FC ViOn Zlaté Moravce	Trnava
17:00 CEST (UTC+02:00)	Vlasko 38'; Moško 49' (o.g.); Cabral 90'	Report		Stadium: Štadión Antona Malatinského; Attendance: 0 Referee: Marián Ruc

17 April 2021 5	ŠK Slovan Bratislava	1–2	FC Spartak Trnava	Bratislava
15:30 CEST (UTC+02:00)	Ratao 85' (pen.)	Report	Bozhikov 12' (o.g.); Savvidis 65'	Stadium: Tehelné pole Attendance: 0 Referee: Erik Gemzický

24 April 2021 6	FC Spartak Trnava	2–0	AS Trenčín	Trnava
17:00 CEST (UTC+02:00)	Yusuf 7'; Ristovski 13'	Report		Stadium: Štadión Antona Malatinského; Attendance: 0 Referee: Marek Mastiš

2 May 2021 7	FC Spartak Trnava	3–0	ŠK Slovan Bratislava	Trnava
18:00 CEST (UTC+02:00)	Ristovski 20' (pen.), 84' (pen.); Yusuf 76'; Karhan (red card) 87'	Report		Stadium: Štadión Antona Malatinského; Attendance: 0 Referee: Erik Gemzický

8 May 2021 8	FC ViOn Zlaté Moravce	0–0	FC Spartak Trnava	Zlaté Moravce
17:00 CEST (UTC+02:00)		Report		Stadium: Štadión FC ViOn; Attendance: 0 Referee: Martin Dohál

15 May 2021 9	FC Spartak Trnava	1–1	MŠK Žilina	Trnava
18:00 CEST (UTC+02:00)	Yusuf 44'	Report	Kurminowski 78' (pen.)	Stadium: Štadión Antona Malatinského; Referee: Ivan Kružliak

22 May 2021 10	FC DAC 1904 Dunajská Streda	2–0	FC Spartak Trnava	Dunajská Streda
18:00 CEST (UTC+02:00)	Divković 34'; Balić 54'; Davis (penalty missed) 60'	Report	Bukata (red card) 18'; Mikovič (yellow card) 30' (yellow-red card) 58'	Stadium: MOL Aréna; Attendance: 500; Referee: Peter Ziemba

== Slovak Cup ==
2 September 2020 2nd round	OFK Malženice (3)	0–3	FC Spartak Trnava	Malženice
17:00 CEST (UTC+02:00)		Report	Tumma 10'; Cabral 15'; Godinho 85'	Attendance: 1000; Referee: Martin Ježík

16 September 2020 3rd round	FK Agropo Zvončín (4)	1–10	FC Spartak Trnava	Zvončín
16:00 CEST (UTC+02:00)	Rumpel 70'	Report	Yusuf 18', 43'; Brestovanský 24' (o.g.); Savvidis 45'; Olejník 48', 51', 56'; Yao 60', 84'; Mikovič 87'	Referee: Martin Dohál

4th round	MFK Tatran Liptovský Mikuláš (2)	Cancelled (Note: Due the COVID-19 pandemic organizers make changes in a format of the 2020–21 Slovak Cup. FC Spartak Trnava promote to the Round of 16.)	FC Spartak Trnava

6 April 2021 Round of 16	FC Spartak Trnava	0–1	AS Trenčín (1)	Topoľčany
11:00 CEST (UTC+02:00)		Report	Corryn 57'	Attendance: Adam Somoláni

== Statistics ==
=== Appearances and goals ===
No.	Pos	Nat	Player	Total		Fortuna Liga		Slovak Cup	
No.	Pos	Nat	Player	Apps	Goals	Apps	Goals	Apps	Goals
Goalkeepers
1	GK	(Slovakia) SVK	Ľuboš Kamenár	3	0	2+1	0	0	0
31	GK	(Slovakia) SVK	Dobrivoj Rusov	24	0	23	0	1	0
71	GK	(Slovakia) SVK	Dominik Takáč	9	0	7	0	2	0
Defenders
2	DF	(Slovakia) SVK	Matúš Turňa	19	0	13+5	0	1	0
3	DF	(Slovakia) SVK	Gergely Tumma	20	2	11+7	1	2	1
4	DF	(Slovakia) SVK	Marek Václav	4	0	2+1	0	1	0
5	DF	(Slovenia) SLO	Dejan Trajkovski	5	0	1+4	0	0	0
6	DF	(Nigeria) NGR	Izuchuckwu Anthony	20	0	17+1	0	2	0
12	DF	(Slovakia) SVK	Mário Mihál	5	0	3+2	0	0	0
13	DF	(Slovakia) SVK	Marek Ujlaky	1	0	0+1	0	0	0
16	DF	(Iceland) ISL	Birkir Valur Jónsson	4	0	2+1	0	0+1	0
18	DF	(Slovakia) SVK	Lukáš Jendrek	1	0	0+1	0	0	0
20	DF	(Greece) GRE	Marios Tsaousis	13	0	8+4	0	0+1	0
23	DF	(Czech Republic) CZE	Filip Twardzik	14	1	13	1	1	0
24	DF	(Slovakia) SVK	Kristián Koštrna	15	0	14	0	1	0
26	DF	(Slovakia) SVK	Sebastian Kóša	20	1	8+10	1	1+1	0
Midfielders
8	MF	(Slovakia) SVK	Jakub Grič	33	1	31	1	1+1	0
13	MF	(Slovakia) SVK	Matej Jakúbek	4	0	3	0	0+1	0
14	MF	(Nigeria) NGR	Johnson Nsumoh	11	0	0+9	0	0+2	0
17	MF	(Slovakia) SVK	Peter Kolesár	21	0	6+12	0	1+2	0
19	MF	(Spain) ESP	Dani Iglesias	12	0	4+6	0	0+2	0
21	MF	(Ivory Coast) CIV	Yann Yao	24	4	16+5	2	1+2	2
22	MF	(Slovakia) SVK	Samuel Benovič	14	0	2+11	0	1	0
27	MF	(Slovakia) SVK	Patrick Karhan	1	0	0+1	0	0	0
28	MF	(Slovakia) SVK	Martin Bukata	24	3	19+3	3	2	0
29	MF	(Slovakia) SVK	Martin Mikovič	30	3	27	2	3	1
33	MF	(Slovakia) SVK	Ján Vlasko	27	5	17+7	5	1+2	0
76	MF	(Slovakia) SVK	Kristián Mihálek	2	0	0+2	0	0	0
79	MF	(Brazil) BRA	Saymon Cabral	35	7	30+2	6	3	1
81	MF	(Brazil) BRA	Allecks Godinho	2	1	0+1	0	0+1	1
88	MF	(Greece) GRE	Kyriakos Savvidis	27	4	23+2	3	2	1
Forwards
7	FW	(North Macedonia) MKD	Milan Ristovski	103	2	101+1	2	1	0
25	FW	(Nigeria) NGR	Bamidele Yusuf	32	9	26+3	7	3	2
45	FW	(Slovakia) SVK	Stanislav Olejník	15	3	6+8	0	0+1	3
Players transferred out during the season
7	FW	(Slovakia) SVK	Erik Pačinda	13	5	8+4	5	1	0
23	FW	(Greece) GRE	Dimitris Konstantinidis	2	0	0+1	0	1	0

=== Goalscorers ===
Rank	No.	Pos.	Name	Fortuna Liga	Slovak Cup	Total
1	16	FW	(Nigeria) Bamidele Yusuf	9	2	11
2	79	MF	(Brazil) Saymon Cabral	6	1	7
3	7	FW	(Slovakia) Erik Pačinda	5	0	5
3	33	MF	(Slovakia) Ján Vlasko	5	0	5
3	7	FW	(North Macedonia) Milan Ristovski	5	0	5
6	21	MF	(Ivory Coast) Yann Yao	2	2	4
6	88	MF	(Greece) Kyriakos Savvidis	3	1	4
8	28	MF	(Slovakia) Martin Bukata	3	0	3
8	29	MF	(Slovakia) Martin Mikovič	2	1	3
8	4	FW	(Slovakia) Stanislav Olejník	0	3	3
10	3	DF	(Slovakia) Gergely Tumma	1	1	2
12	8	MF	(Slovakia) Jakub Grič	1	0	1
12	23	DF	(Czech Republic) Filip Twardzik	1	0	1
12	26	DF	(Slovakia) Sebastian Kóša	1	0	1
12	81	MF	(Brazil) Allecks Godinho	0	1	1
Totals				42	12	54

== Awards ==
=== Goal of the Month ===
Month	Player	Reference
November	(Greece) Kyriakos Savvidis	
