= Kružliak =

Kružliak is a Slovak surname. Notable people with the surname include:

- Dominik Kružliak (born 1996), Slovak footballer, cousin of Rastislav
- Ivan Kružliak (born 1984), Slovak football referee
- Rastislav Kružliak (born 1999), Slovak footballer
