= Kyriakos Savvidis =

Greek footballer (born 1995)

Personal information
- Date of birth: 20 June 1995 (age 31)
- Place of birth: Katerini, Greece
- Height: 1.81 m (5 ft 11 in)
- Position: Midfielder

Team information
- Current team: Wisła Płock
- Number: 88

Youth career
- –2013: PAOK

Senior career*
Years	Team	Apps	(Gls)
2013–2016	PAOK	9	(0)
2015	→ OFI (loan)	0	(0)
2016	→ Zemplín Michalovce (loan)	4	(0)
2016–2018	Panionios	46	(1)
2019	Aris	0	(0)
2019–2020	Zemplín Michalovce	22	(0)
2020–2023	Spartak Trnava	82	(10)
2023–2026	Slovan Bratislava	66	(0)
2026–	Wisła Płock	8	(1)

International career
2013	Greece U19	1	(0)
2015	Greece U21	2	(0)
- * Club domestic league appearances and goals as of 14:23, 28 April 2026 (UTC)

Kyriakos Savvidis (Greek: Κυριάκος Σαββίδης; born 20 June 1995) is a Greek professional footballer who plays as a midfielder for Ekstraklasa club Wisła Płock.

== Career ==
Kyriakos Savvidis, after making his debut with the first team and celebrating the championship with U-20 as one of the most important players, tied his future with PAOK at the end of the 2013–14 season by signing a new four-year contract that would keep him with the club until the summer of 2018.

On 23 February 2016, Savvidis joined Slovak club Zemplín Michalovce on a six-month loan deal, until the end of the 2015–16 season.

On 8 July 2016, he signed a two-year contract with Panionios for an undisclosed fee, while his previous club PAOK would keep a 30% resale clause.

On 24 January 2019, Savvidis joined Aris Thessaloniki on a six-month contract. On 8 August 2019, he signed a year-long deal with Slovak club Zemplín Michalovce. On 9 September 2020, he moved to another Fortuna Liga club Spartak Trnava.

On 4 June 2023, he signed a three-year contract with the biggest rival of his previous employer, Slovan Bratislava.

On 25 February 2026, Savvidis signed with Polish Ekstraklasa club Wisła Płock until May 2027 for an undisclosed fee. On 10 April 2026, Savvidis scored his first goal for Wisła in a 1–0 win over Lechia Gdańsk.

== Career statistics ==
As of match played 26 April 2026

Appearances and goals by club, season and competition
Club	Season	League			National cup (Note: Includes Greek Cup, Slovak Cup)		Continental		Other		Total	
Club	Season	Division	Apps	Goals	Apps	Goals	Apps	Goals	Apps	Goals	Apps	Goals
PAOK	2013–14	Super League Greece	1	0	0	0	—		—		1	0
PAOK	2014–15	Super League Greece	7	0	2	0	0	0	—		9	0
PAOK	2015–16	Super League Greece	1	0	1	0	4 (Note: Appearances in UEFA Europa League)	0	—		6	0
PAOK	Total		9	0	3	0	4	0	—		16	0
Zemplín Michalovce (loan)	2015–16	Slovak First Football League	4	0	0	0	—		—		4	0
Panionios	2016–17	Super League Greece	23	1	2	0	—		—		25	1
Panionios	2017–18	Super League Greece	23	0	8	0	4	0	—		35	0
Panionios	Total		46	1	10	0	4	0	—		60	1
Aris	2018–19	Super League Greece	0	0	0	0	—		—		0	0
Zemplín Michalovce	2019–20	Slovak First Football League	22	0	1	0	—		—		23	0
Spartak Trnava	2020–21	Slovak First Football League	25	3	2	1	—		—		27	4
Spartak Trnava	2021–22	Slovak First Football League	29	3	5	0	6 (Note: Appearances in UEFA Conference League)	0	—		40	3
Spartak Trnava	2022–23	Slovak First Football League	28	4	7	0	4	0	—		39	4
Spartak Trnava	Total		82	10	14	1	10	0	—		106	11
Slovan Bratislava	2023–24	Slovak First Football League	26	0	5	0	13 (Note: Five appearances in UEFA Champions League, one appearance in UEFA Europa League, seven appearances in UEFA Europa Conference League)	0	—		44	0
Slovan Bratislava	2024–25	Slovak First Football League	26	0	5	0	14 (Note: Appearances in UEFA Champions League)	0	—		45	0
Slovan Bratislava	2025–26	Slovak First Football League	14	0	2	0	6	0	—		22	0
Slovan Bratislava	Total		66	0	12	0	33	0	—		111	0
Wisła Płock	2025–26	Ekstraklasa	8	1	—		—		—		8	1
Career total			237	12	40	1	51	0	0	0	328	13

== Honours ==
Spartak Trnava

- Slovak Cup: 2021–22, 2022–23

Slovan Bratislava

- Slovak First Football League: 2023–24, 2024–25

Individual

- Slovak First Football League Goal of the Month: November 2020, October 2021
