= 2021–22 in Slovak football =

Football in Slovakia
- Season: 2021–22

Men's football
- Fortuna Liga: Slovan Bratislava
- 2. Liga: Podbrezová
- Slovak Cup: Spartak Trnava

The 2021–22 season was the 27th season of competitive association football in Slovakia after Czechoslovakia was divided into two new states.

== Slovakia national football team ==
=== Kits ===
First colours	Second colours

=== 2022 FIFA World Cup qualification ===
==== 2022 FIFA World Cup qualification Group H ====
Pos	Team	Pld	W	D	L	GF	GA	GD	Pts	Qualification
1	Croatia	10	7	2	1	21	4	+17	23	Qualification for 2022 FIFA World Cup
2	Russia (Note: On 28 February 2022, FIFA suspended Russia from international competitions due to the Russian invasion of Ukraine.)	10	7	1	2	19	6	+13	22	Advance to play-offs
3	Slovakia	10	3	5	2	17	10	+7	14	
4	Slovenia	10	4	2	4	13	12	+1	14	
5	Cyprus	10	1	2	7	4	21	−17	5	
6	Malta	10	1	2	7	9	30	−21	5	

Source: FIFA, UEFA
Rules for classification: Tiebreakers

===== 2022 FIFA World Cup qualification fixtures and results =====
1 September 2021 2022 FIFA World Cup qualification	Slovenia	1–1	Slovakia	Ljubljana
20:45 CEST (UTC+02:00)	Stojanović 42'	Report (FIFA); Report (UEFA)	Boženík 32'	Stadium: Stožice Stadium; Attendance: 4,034; Referee: István Kovács (Romania)

4 September 2021 2022 FIFA World Cup qualification	Slovakia	0–1	Croatia	Bratislava
20:45 CEST (UTC+02:00)		Report (FIFA); Report (UEFA)	Brozović 86'	Stadium: Tehelné Pole; Attendance: 9,047; Referee: Bartosz Frankowski (Poland)

7 September 2021 2022 FIFA World Cup qualification	Slovakia	2–0	Cyprus	Bratislava
20:45 CEST (UTC+02:00)	Schranz 55'; Koscelník 77'	Report (FIFA); Report (UEFA)		Stadium: Tehelné Pole; Attendance: 6,762; Referee: Aliyar Aghayev (Azerbaijan)

8 October 2021 2022 FIFA World Cup qualification	Russia	1–0	Slovakia	Kazan
20:45 CEST (UTC+02:00)	Škriniar 24' (o.g.)	Report (FIFA); Report (UEFA)		Stadium: Ak Bars Arena; Attendance: 9,588; Referee: Antonio Mateu Lahoz (Spain)

11 October 2021 2022 FIFA World Cup qualification	Croatia	2–2	Slovakia	Osijek
20:45 CEST (UTC+02:00)	Kramarić 25'; Modrić 71'	Report (FIFA); Report (UEFA)	Schranz 20'; Haraslín 45'	Stadium: Gradski Vrt Stadium; Attendance: 9,926; Referee: Ovidiu Hațegan (Romania)

11 November 2021 2022 FIFA World Cup qualification	Slovakia	2–2	Slovenia	Trnava
20:45 CET (UTC+01:00)	Duda 58' (pen.); Strelec 74'	Report (FIFA); Report (UEFA)	Zajc 18'; Mevlja 62'	Stadium: Anton Malatinský Stadium; Attendance: 2,726; Referee: Mattias Gestranius (Finland)

14 November 2021 2022 FIFA World Cup qualification	Malta	0–6	Slovakia	Ta' Qali
15:00 CET (UTC+01:00)		Report (FIFA); Report (UEFA)	Rusnák 6', 16'; Duda 8', 69', 80'; De Marco 72'	Stadium: National Stadium; Attendance: 3,293; Referee: Fran Jović (Croatia)

=== 2022–23 UEFA Nations League ===
==== 2022–23 UEFA Nations League C Group 3 ====
Pos	Team	Pld	W	D	L	GF	GA	GD	Pts	Promotion	(Kazakhstan)	(Azerbaijan)	(Slovakia)	(Belarus)
1	Kazakhstan (P)	6	4	1	1	8	6	+2	13	Promotion to League B	—	2–0	2–1	2–1
2	Azerbaijan	6	3	1	2	7	4	+3	10		3–0	—	0–1	2–0
3	Slovakia	6	2	1	3	5	6	−1	7		0–1	1–2	—	1–1
4	Belarus	6	0	3	3	3	7	−4	3	Spared from relegation play-outs	1–1	0–0	0–1	—

Source: UEFA
Rules for classification: Tiebreakers
(P) Promoted

===== 2022–23 UEFA Nations League fixtures and results =====
3 June 2022 2022–23 UEFA Nations League C	Slovakia	v	Belarus
20:45		Report

6 June 2022 2022–23 UEFA Nations League C	Slovakia	v	Kazakhstan or Moldova
20:45		Report

10 June 2022 2022–23 UEFA Nations League C	Azerbaijan	v	Slovakia
18:00 (20:00 UTC+4)		Report

13 June 2022 2022–23 UEFA Nations League C	Kazakhstan or Moldova	v	Slovakia
16:00 (20:00 UTC+6) or 20:45 (21:45 UTC+3)		Report

=== Friendlies ===
25 March 2022 Friendly	Norway	v	Slovakia	Oslo, Norway
				Stadium: Ullevaal Stadion

29 March 2022 Friendly	Slovakia	v	Finland	Murcia, Spain
				Stadium: Estadio Enrique Roca

== UEFA competitions ==
=== UEFA Champions League ===
==== First qualifying round ====
Team 1	Agg.	Team 2	1st leg	2nd leg
Slovan Bratislava (Slovakia)	3–2 (Note: Losers drawn to receive a bye to the Europa Conference League third qualifying round.)	(Republic of Ireland) Shamrock Rovers	2–0	1–2

==== Second qualifying round ====
Team 1	Agg.	Team 2	1st leg	2nd leg
Slovan Bratislava (Slovakia)	2–3	(Switzerland) Young Boys	0–0	2–3

=== UEFA Europa League ===
==== Third qualifying round ====
Team 1	Agg.	Team 2	1st leg	2nd leg
Lincoln Red Imps (Gibraltar)	2–4	(Slovakia) Slovan Bratislava	1–3	1–1

==== Play-off round ====
Team 1	Agg.	Team 2	1st leg	2nd leg
Olympiacos (Greece)	5–2	(Slovakia) Slovan Bratislava	3–0	2–2

=== UEFA Europa Conference League ===
==== First qualifying round ====
Team 1	Agg.	Team 2	1st leg	2nd leg
Žilina (Slovakia)	6–3	(Georgia (country)) Dila Gori	5–1	1–2
Mosta (Malta)	3–4 (Note: Order of legs reversed after original draw.)	(Slovakia) Spartak Trnava	3–2	0–2

==== Second qualifying round ====
Team 1	Agg.	Team 2	1st leg	2nd leg
Apollon Limassol (Cyprus)	3–5	(Slovakia) Žilina	1–3	2–2
Partizan (Serbia)	3–0	(Slovakia) DAC Dunajská Streda	1–0	2–0
Spartak Trnava (Slovakia)	1–1 (4–3 p)	(Romania) Sepsi OSK	0–0	1–1 (a.e.t.)

==== Third qualifying round ====
Team 1	Agg.	Team 2	1st leg	2nd leg
Tobol (Kazakhstan)	0–6	(Slovakia) Žilina	0–1	0–5
Spartak Trnava (Slovakia)	0–1	(Israel) Maccabi Tel Aviv	0–0	0–1

==== Play-off round ====
Team 1	Agg.	Team 2	1st leg	2nd leg
Jablonec (Czech Republic)	8–1	(Slovakia) Žilina	5–1	3–0

==== Group stage ====
===== Group F =====
Pos	Team	Pld	W	D	L	GF	GA	GD	Pts	Qualification	COP	PAO	SLO	LIN
1	(Denmark) Copenhagen	6	5	0	1	15	5	+10	15	Advance to round of 16	—	1–2	2–0	3–1
2	(Greece) PAOK	6	3	2	1	8	4	+4	11	Advance to knockout round play-offs	1–2	—	1–1	2–0
3	(Slovakia) Slovan Bratislava	6	2	2	2	8	7	+1	8		1–3	0–0	—	2–0
4	(Gibraltar) Lincoln Red Imps	6	0	0	6	2	17	−15	0		0–4	0–2	1–4	—

Source: UEFA
Rules for classification: Group stage tiebreakers

== Men's football ==
=== Fortuna liga ===
==== Regular stage ====
Pos	Team	Pld	W	D	L	GF	GA	GD	Pts	Qualification
1	Slovan Bratislava	22	16	5	1	52	16	+36	53	Qualification for the championship group
2	Spartak Trnava	22	13	6	3	29	12	+17	45	Qualification for the championship group
3	Ružomberok	22	11	8	3	39	17	+22	41	Qualification for the championship group
4	DAC Dunajská Streda	22	10	6	6	28	23	+5	36	Qualification for the championship group
5	Sereď	22	9	5	8	28	28	0	32	Qualification for the championship group
6	Žilina	22	8	6	8	34	33	+1	30	Qualification for the championship group
7	Senica	22	7	6	9	21	32	−11	27	Qualification for the relegation group
8	Trenčín	22	6	7	9	32	33	−1	25	Qualification for the relegation group
9	Zemplín Michalovce	22	7	2	13	20	31	−11	23	Qualification for the relegation group
10	Tatran Liptovský Mikuláš	22	5	6	11	27	43	−16	21	Qualification for the relegation group
11	Zlaté Moravce	22	4	7	11	22	36	−14	19	Qualification for the relegation group
12	Pohronie	22	2	4	16	19	47	−28	10	Qualification for the relegation group

Source: Fortuna Liga (in Slovak)
Rules for classification: 1) Points; 2) Head-to-head points; 3) Head-to-head goal difference; 4) Head-to-head away goals scored; 5) Play-off.

==== Championship group ====
Pos	Team	Pld	W	D	L	GF	GA	GD	Pts	Qualification	SLO	RUŽ	TRN	DAC	SER	ŽIL
1	Slovan Bratislava (C)	32	22	8	2	71	25	+46	74	Qualification for the Champions League first qualifying round	—	1–1	1–0	3–1	5–1	2–2
2	Ružomberok	32	17	12	3	58	23	+35	63	Qualification for the Europa Conference League first qualifying round	0–0	—	0–0	4–1	3–1	3–0
3	Spartak Trnava	32	17	9	6	36	17	+19	60	Qualification for the Europa Conference League second qualifying round (Note: Spartak Trnava qualified for the Europa Conference League second qualifying round as the 2021–22 Slovak Cup winners.)	0–1	0–0	—	1–0	0–1	1–0
4	DAC Dunajská Streda (O)	32	12	10	10	39	37	+2	46	Qualification for the Europa Conference League play-offs	2–0	2–3	1–1	—	0–0	2–0
5	Sereď (R)	32	10	9	13	34	46	−12	39	Relegation (Note: Sereď did not obtain a license for the next season and were automatically relegated.)	0–3	1–3	0–2	0–0	—	1–1
6	Žilina	32	8	10	14	43	52	−9	34	Qualification for the Europa Conference League play-offs	2–3	0–2	1–2	2–2	1–1	—

Source: Fortuna Liga (in Slovak)
Rules for classification: 1) Points; 2) Head-to-head points; 3) Head-to-head goal difference; 4) Head-to-head away goals scored; 5) Play-off.
(C) Champions; (O) Play-off winners; (R) Relegated

==== Relegation group ====
Pos	Team	Pld	W	D	L	GF	GA	GD	Pts	Qualification or relegation	TRE	TLM	ZMI	SEN	ZLM	POH
7	Trenčín	32	13	9	10	58	43	+15	48	Qualification for the Europa Conference League play-offs	—	5–2	2–2	4–1	4–3	2–0
8	Tatran Liptovský Mikuláš	32	11	7	14	42	57	−15	40	Qualification for the Europa Conference League play-offs	0–3	—	3–1	2–1	2–2	1–0
9	Zemplín Michalovce	32	12	4	16	32	42	−10	40		1–0	1–2	—	1–0	1–0	1–0
10	Senica (R)	32	9	7	16	29	51	−22	34	Relegation (Note: Senica did not obtain a license for the next season and were automatically relegated.)	0–3	0–3	2–1	—	0–0	2–1
11	Zlaté Moravce	32	7	9	16	33	50	−17	30		0–2	0–1	1–1	3–2	—	1–3
12	Pohronie (R)	32	4	6	22	27	59	−32	18	Relegation to the 2. Liga	1–1	1–1	1–2	1–0	0–1	—

Source: Fortuna Liga (in Slovak)
Rules for classification: 1) Points; 2) Head-to-head points; 3) Head-to-head goal difference; 4) Head-to-head away goals scored; 5) Play-off.
(R) Relegated

=== 2. liga ===
Pos	Team	Pld	W	D	L	GF	GA	GD	Pts	Promotion, qualification or relegation
1	Podbrezová (C, P)	30	24	2	4	86	25	+61	74	Promotion to Fortuna liga
2	Dukla Banská Bystrica (P)	30	21	6	3	62	24	+38	69	Promotion to Fortuna liga
3	Skalica (P)	30	19	5	6	49	20	+29	62	Promotion to Fortuna liga
4	Komárno	30	17	8	5	51	29	+22	59	
5	Košice	30	17	5	8	73	38	+35	56	
6	Humenné	30	16	8	6	36	30	+6	56	
7	Šamorín	30	13	5	12	47	42	+5	44	
8	Petržalka	30	12	5	13	54	48	+6	41	
9	Žilina B	30	10	7	13	46	48	−2	37	
10	Slavoj Trebišov	30	9	7	14	28	48	−20	34	
11	Dubnica	30	8	7	15	33	51	−18	31	
12	Púchov	30	8	5	17	36	49	−13	29	
13	Rohožník (R)	30	8	5	17	30	58	−28	29	Relegation to 3. Liga
14	Slovan Bratislava U21 (R)	30	7	5	18	36	61	−25	26	Relegation to 3. Liga
15	Partizán Bardejov (R)	30	3	9	18	26	54	−28	18	Relegation to 3. Liga
16	Námestovo (R)	30	2	3	25	19	87	−68	9	Relegation to 3. Liga

Source: druhaliga.sk
Rules for classification: 1) Points; 2) Head-to-head points; 3) Head-to-head goal difference; 4) Head-to-head away goals scored; 5) Play-off.
(C) Champions; (P) Promoted; (R) Relegated

=== Cup Competitions ===
==== Slovak Cup ====
===== Final =====
8 May 2022
17:30 (UTC+2)

Slovan Bratislava	1–2 (a.e.t.)	Spartak Trnava
Mustafić 49'	Report	Bukata 52'; Azevedo 114'

Tehelné pole, Bratislava
Attendance: 10,411
Referee: Peter Ziemba

== See also ==
- List of Slovak football transfers summer 2021
- List of Slovak football transfers winter 2021–22
- List of foreign Slovak First League players
