= Dominik Takáč =

Slovak footballer

Personal information
- Date of birth: 12 January 1999 (age 27)
- Place of birth: Galanta, Slovakia
- Height: 1.95 m (6 ft 5 in)
- Position: Goalkeeper

Team information
- Current team: Slovan Bratislava
- Number: 71

Youth career
- 2006–2014: Slovan Galanta
- 2014–2017: Spartak Trnava

Senior career*
Years	Team	Apps	(Gls)
2017–2024	Spartak Trnava	92	(0)
2024–	Slovan Bratislava	52	(0)

International career^{‡}
2017	Slovakia U18	4	(0)
2026–	Slovakia	1	(0)
- * Club domestic league appearances and goals as of 24 October 2026 ‡ National team caps and goals as of 1 June 2026

Dominik Takáč (born 12 January 1999) is a Slovak footballer who plays as a goalkeeper for Slovan Bratislava.

== Club career ==
=== Spartak Trnava ===
Takáč made his professional Fortuna Liga debut for Spartak Trnava against AS Trenčín on 24 May 2019.

=== ŠK Slovan Bratislava ===
On 13 July 2024, ŠK Slovan Bratislava confirmed the signing of Dominik Takáč on a free transfer. He signed a three-year contract at the Tehelné Pole.

== International career ==
Takáč was first time called up to the Slovak national team nomination on 23 May 2022 by Štefan Tarkovič, while named with Marek Rodák and František Plach for four 2022–23 UEFA Nations League C fixtures against Belarus, Azerbaijan and twice against Kazakhstan. Tarkovič commented on this nomination saying that Takáč's nomination is a way of transferring quality from the domestic league to the national team. Takáč remained in the nomination in Francesco Calzona premier call-up for the national team in September. He remained uncapped in both call-ups. He was left out of the squad for November friendlies. In early December, senior national team prospective players' training camp was hosted at NTC Senec and Takáč was one of four nominated goalkeepers.

== Career statistics ==
=== Club ===
As of match played 24 October 2026

Appearances and goals by club, season and competition
Club	Season	League			Cup		Europe		Total	
Club	Season	Division	Apps	Goals	Apps	Goals	Apps	Goals	Apps	Goals
Spartak Trnava	2017–18	Slovak First League	0	0	0	0	—		0	0
Spartak Trnava	2018–19	Slovak First League	1	0	0	0	0	0	1	0
Spartak Trnava	2019–20	Slovak First League	2	0	0	0	0	0	2	0
Spartak Trnava	2020–21	Slovak First League	7	0	1	0	—		8	0
Spartak Trnava	2021–22	Slovak First League	29	0	4	0	6 (Note: Appearances in UEFA Conference League)	0	38	0
Spartak Trnava	2022–23	Slovak First League	23	0	2	0	3	0	28	0
Spartak Trnava	2023–24	Slovak First League	30	0	5	0	11	0	46	0
Spartak Trnava	Total		92	0	12	0	20	0	124	0
Slovan Bratislava	2024–25	Slovak First League	23	0	2	0	14 (Note: Appearances in UEFA Champions League)	0	39	0
Slovan Bratislava	2025–26	Slovak First League	22	0	0	0	11 (Note: Four appearances in UEFA Champions League, two appearances in UEFA Europa League, five appearances in UEFA Conference League)	0	33	0
Slovan Bratislava	2026–27	Slovak First League	7	0	0	0	8	0	15	0
Slovan Bratislava	Total		52	0	2	0	33	0	87	0
Career total			144	0	14	0	53	0	211	0

=== International ===
As of match played 1 June 2026

Appearances and goals by national team and year
National team	Year	Apps	Goals
Slovakia	2026	1	0
Total		1	0

== Honours ==
Spartak Trnava

- Slovak First League: 2017–18
- Slovak Cup: 2018–19, 2021–22, 2022–23

Individual

- Slovak Super Liga Best Goalkeeper: 2021–22, 2023–24
- Slovak Super Liga Team of the Season: 2021–22, 2023–24
