= Filip Škrteľ =

Slovak footballer

Personal information
- Full name: Filip Škrteľ
- Date of birth: 10 August 2002 (age 24)
- Place of birth: Handlová, Slovakia
- Height: 1.87 m (6 ft 2 in)
- Position: Centre-forward

Team information
- Current team: Spartak Myjava
- Number: 24

Youth career
- 2009–2011: FK Hajskala Ráztočno
- 2011–2021: Prievidza
- 2015–2020: → Žilina (loan)
- 2020–2021: → Dukla Banská Bystrica (loan)

Senior career*
Years	Team	Apps	(Gls)
2021–2023	Pohronie	2	(0)
2022	→ Kalná nad Hronom (loan)		
2023–2023	Spartak Myjava	10	(0)
2023-	OFK Baník Lehota pod Vtáčnikom	30	(15)
- * Club domestic league appearances and goals as of 7 January 2025

Filip Škrteľ (born 10 August 2002) is a Slovak professional footballer who currently plays for OFK Baník Lehota pod Vtáčnikom as a striker.

== Club career ==
=== FK Pohronie ===
Škrteľ made his Fortuna Liga debut for Pohronie in an away fixture against ViOn Zlaté Moravce on 24 August 2021. He came on to replace Daniel Ściślak mere five minutes before stoppage time. Pohronie was already trailing 1–0, following a goal by Marián Chobot, from earlier in the second half. The match concluded with the same score.

== Personal life ==
Škrteľ studied at a sports gymnasium in Žilina. Škrteľ is related to a former Slovak international defender and captain Martin Škrteľ, who is the cousin of Filip's father Roman.
