= Johnson Nsumoh =

Nigerian footballer

Nsumoh Johnson
Personal information
- Full name: Nsumoh Johnson Kalu
- Date of birth: 14 June 2001 (age 25)
- Place of birth: Port Harcourt, Nigeria
- Height: 1.70 m (5 ft 7 in)
- Position: Winger

Youth career
- Family Love Football Academy

Senior career*
Years	Team	Apps	(Gls)
2020–2021	Spartak Trnava	12	(0)
2021–2022	Mosta	10	(0)
2023	Galanta	?	(2)
2023	Zlaté Moravce	14	(0)
2025	Trenčín	15	(0)
2025–2026	Lehota pod Vtáčnikom	7	(2)
2026	Deportivo Riestra	1	(0)
- * Club domestic league appearances and goals as of 16:58, 4 October 2026 (UTC)

Nsumoh Johnson Kalu (born 14 June 2001) is a Nigerian professional footballer who plays as a winger.

Kalua's career in Slovakia began in 2020, when he moved from his native country to Spartak Trnava at the age of eighteen. After less than two seasons, he left to make further football steps in Malta, and in 2023 he returned to Slovakia through Slovan Galanta. He played in FC ViOn Zlaté Moravce and, after passing the trial, joined AS Trenčín. He played a total of 16 games for AS, but would not be able to score a goal.

== Career ==
=== Spartak Trnava ===
Johnson Nsumoh joined Spartak Trnava in February 2020. He made his Fortuna Liga debut for Spartak at pod Dubňom against Žilina on 14 June 2020. He came on in the second half, with the final score already set at 2–1 for the home side, to replace Bamidele Yusuf. He featured in the quarter-finals of the 2020–21 Slovak Cup, where Trnava would lose 1–0 to AS Trenčín and get knocked out of the competition.

=== Mosta ===
Johnson Nsumoh joined Maltese club Mosta FC in July 2021 on a four-year contract. During the 2021–22 season, he made 14 appearances in the Maltese Premier League for Mosta, scoring 2 goals. In his European debut during the 2021–22 Conference League qualifying round, Johnson Nsumoh scored Mosta's third goal in a 3–2 home win against his former club Spartak Trnava on 8 July 2021, contributing to the victory before their elimination in the next leg.

=== Later career ===
In 2023, Johnson Nsumoh joined FC ViOn Zlaté Moravce. In 2025, he to joined AS Trenčín as a free agent. He made his debut for the club in a 1–0 win against league new comers KFC Komárno, playing 62 minutes of the game. After playing a total of 16 games for Trenčín without scoring a goal, it was announced that his contract with the club would be terminated. A few weeks later, Johnson Nsumoh joined 2. Liga newcomers OFK Baník Lehota pod Vtáčnikom. Following the end of his contract with the second division club, he joined Argentine first league club Deportivo Riestra.
