= FC Slovan Galanta =

Slovak football club

- Full name: FC Slovan Galanta
- Founded: 1911
- Ground: Štadión FC Slovan Galanta, Galanta
- Capacity: 3,000
- Chairman: Alexander Mikovič
- Coach: Mikuláš Radványi
- League: 2.liga
- 2025-26: 1st (promoted)
- Website: https://slovangalanta.sk/

FC Slovan Galanta is a Slovak football team, based in the town of Galanta. The club was founded in 1911.

== History ==
=== 1911–1940: Early years ===
In 1911, GSG Galántai Sport Club was found in the city. The current club has no continuity with this club, but they are keeping the traditions of the first club in the town. The early stages of development saw multiple mergers and changes in names, which mirrored the shifting organizational structure of amateur football in Czechoslovakia after World War I. In 1921, GSC merged with Galántai Ifjúsági Sport Egylet, taking on the GISE name until 1925. At the same time, Galántai Futball Club (GFC) was established in 1919 and operated until 1925, when it merged with GISE to form Galántai Sport Egylet (GSE), under which the club participated from 1925 to 1940. During the time when Galanta was governed by Hungary (1938–1945) due to the First Vienna Award, the club was known as Galántai Levente Egylet (GLE) from 1941 to 1944, named after the Hungarian paramilitary youth group Levente. During the 1936/37 season, GSE Galanta led the Nové Zámky – Južný okres I. trieda league, achieving 13 wins out of 16 matches and scoring 43 goals, although they ultimately finished second in the following qualification for Slovenská Divízia Západ. The highlight of this period occurred in 1937 when the club won the Esti Újság Cup, achieving its first significant achievement, over Ligeti SC Bratislava 1–0 in the semi-finals and Lévai TE 2–1 in the final.

=== 1945–1993 ===
After World War II, Slovan Galanta, would change its name to ŠK Galanta from 1945 to 1948. In the 1946/1947 season, the club was promoted to the 3. Liga, where it played for two seasons before being relegated.

== Players ==
=== Current squad ===
As of 22 July 2026

Note: Flags indicate national team as defined under FIFA eligibility rules; some limited exceptions apply. Players may hold more than one non-FIFA nationality.

No.	Pos.	Nation	Player
—	MF	SVK	Šimon Kováč
—	MF	SVK	Martin Repa
—	FW	SVK	Ronald Kočík
—	FW	SVK	Marcel Bilčík
—	FW	SVK	Dárius Rusko
—	FW	SVK	Tomáš Horák
—	DF	SVK	Denis Horník (captain)
—	DF	SVK	Michal Cehula
—	MF	SVK	Roman Kollárik
—	DF	SVK	Tomáš Kiss
—	DF	SVK	Kristián Mego
—	MF	SVK	Adam Mihálik
—	GK	SVK	Maxim Adam Amrich

No.	Pos.	Nation	Player
—	GK	SVK	Kristián Húska
—	GK	SVK	Dominik Hollósy
—	DF	SVK	Filip Rajt
—	DF	SVK	David Murar
—	DF	SVK	Martin Slaninka
—	FW	CZE	Miroslav Tomek
—	DF	SVK	Oliver Patrnčiak
—	FW	SVK	Mário Zimáni
—	MF	SVK	Samuel Benovič
—	DF	SVK	Jozef Balog
—	FW	SVK	Patrik Müllner
—	FW	SVK	Martinko Macak (on loan from FC ViOn Zlaté Moravce)
—	FW	SVK	Sebastián Kriška
—	MF	SVK	Lukáš Botlo

== Notable players ==
- (Slovakia) Dominik Takáč
