= Reuben Yem =

Nigerian footballer

Personal information
- Full name: Reuben Yem
- Date of birth: 29 October 1997 (age 29)
- Place of birth: Nigeria
- Height: 1.71 m (5 ft 7 in)
- Position: Right-back

Youth career
- –2017: GBS Football Academy
- 2017: → Gent (loan)

Senior career*
Years	Team	Apps	(Gls)
2018	Inter Bratislava	8	(0)
2018–2019	AS Trenčín	24	(0)
2019–2020	Gent	0	(0)
2020–2023	AS Trenčín	65	(2)
- * Club domestic league appearances and goals as of 20:03, 10 October 2023 (UTC)

Reuben Yem (born 29 October 1997) is a Nigerian professional footballer who plays as a right-back.

== Club career ==
=== AS Trenčín ===
Yem made his Fortuna Liga debut for AS Trenčín against iClinic Sereď on 5 August 2018. He featured in the starting-XI and completed the entirety of the 5:1 win.
