= Menno Bergsen =

Dutch footballer (born 1999)

Personal information
- Full name: Menno Alexander Bergsen
- Date of birth: 26 August 1999 (age 27)
- Place of birth: Oud-Beijerland, Netherlands
- Height: 1.85 m (6 ft 1 in)
- Position: Goalkeeper

Team information
- Current team: Helmond Sport
- Number: 1

Youth career
- –2009: SHO
- 2009–2016: Sparta Rotterdam
- 2016–2017: Dordrecht

Senior career*
Years	Team	Apps	(Gls)
2017–2018	Dordrecht	0	(0)
2018–2019	Eindhoven	6	(0)
2020–2021	Trenčín	8	(0)
2021–2025	Maribor	28	(0)
2025–	Helmond Sport	37	(0)
- * Club domestic league appearances and goals as of 28 April 2026

Menno Bergsen (born 26 August 1999) is a Dutch professional footballer who plays as a goalkeeper for Helmond Sport. Besides the Netherlands, he has played in Slovakia and Slovenia.

== Career ==
Bergsen made his senior debut in 2017 for FC Dordrecht. He played only two games for Dordrecht before switching to FC Eindhoven in 2018. (Note: Menno Bergsen at WorldFootball.net)

In June 2021, Bergsen joined Slovenian top flight side Maribor on a two-year contract. He made his league debut for Maribor on 23 April 2022, when he replaced the injured Ažbe Jug after fifteen minutes in a 2–1 victory against Tabor Sežana.
