= Urban Mazanovský =

Slovak youth international footballer

Personal information
- Full name: Urban Mazanovský
- Date of birth: 17 December 2003 (age 22)
- Place of birth: Topoľčany, Slovakia
- Height: 1.77 m (5 ft 10 in)
- Position: Centre back

Team information
- Current team: Liptovský Mikuláš
- Number: 18

Youth career
- 2010–: AS Trenčín

Senior career*
Years	Team	Apps	(Gls)
2020–2023	AS Trenčín	5	(0)
2021	→ Dubnica nad Váhom (loan)	2	(0)
2022–2023	→ Púchov (loan)	16	(0)
2023–	Liptovský Mikuláš	12	(0)

International career^{‡}
2019	Slovakia U17	3	(0)
2021–	Slovakia U18	1	(0)
2021–	Slovakia U19	2	(0)
- * Club domestic league appearances and goals as of 22 June 2024 ‡ National team caps and goals as of 14:06, 27 July 2021 (UTC)

Urban Mazanovský (born 17 December 2003) is a Slovak footballer who plays for Liptovský Mikuláš as a defender.

== Club career ==
=== AS Trenčín ===
Mazanovský made his Fortuna Liga debut for AS Trenčín against Nitra on 11 July 2020 during a Relegation Group 0:3 defeat. Trenčín was, however, assured a place in the next season prior to the game.
