= Igor Šemrinec =

Slovak footballer

Personal information
- Full name: Igor Šemrinec
- Date of birth: 22 November 1987 (age 38)
- Place of birth: Bojnice, Czechoslovakia
- Height: 1.88 m (6 ft 2 in)
- Position: Goalkeeper

Team information
- Current team: Pohronie
- Number: 90

Youth career
- 2002–2006: Prievidza

Senior career*
Years	Team	Apps	(Gls)
- Prievidza
2010	→ OFK Ludanice (loan)		
2010–2021	AS Trenčín	163	(0)
2013	→ Nové Mesto nad Váhom (loan)	11	(0)
2021–2022	FC Košice	26	(0)
2022–2023	Skalica	9	(0)
2023–	Pohronie	4	(0)
- * Club domestic league appearances and goals as of 15 June 2025

Igor Šemrinec (born 22 November 1987) is a Slovak professional footballer who plays as a goalkeeper for Pohronie.

== Career ==
=== AS Trenčín ===
Šemrinec made his first Corgoň Liga appearance against ViOn Zlaté Moravce.

== Career statistics ==
As of 20 May 2012

Club performance			League		Cup		Continental		Total	
Season	Club	League	Apps	Goals	Apps	Goals	Apps	Goals	Apps	Goals
Slovakia			League		Slovak Cup		Europe		Total	
2010–11	AS Trenčín	2. liga	2	0	1	0	0	0	3	0
2011–12	AS Trenčín	Corgoň Liga	1	0	0	0	0	0	1	0
Career total			3	0	1	0	0	0	4	0

== Honours ==
=== Club ===
AS Trenčín

- Fortuna Liga (2): 2014–15, 2015-16
- Slovnaft Cup (2): 2014–15, 2015-16
