= Filip Mastiš =

Slovak footballer

Personal information
- Full name: Filip Mastiš
- Date of birth: 17 July 2002 (age 24)
- Place of birth: Liptovské Revúce, Slovakia
- Height: 1.87 m (6 ft 2 in)
- Position: Centre-forward

Team information
- Current team: TJ Tatran Liptovské Revúce

Youth career
- 2012–2017: TJ Tatran Liptovské Revúce
- 2017–2020: Ružomberok
- 2020–2021: Tatran Liptovský Mikuláš

Senior career*
Years	Team	Apps	(Gls)
2020–2021	Tatran Liptovský Mikuláš	7	(1)
2021	Pohronie	1	(0)
2022–	TJ Tatran Liptovské Revúce	40	(54)
- * Club domestic league appearances and goals as of 21:16, 23 January 2024 (UTC)

Filip Mastiš (born 17 July 2002) is a professional Slovak footballer who currently plays for amateur side in his native Liptovské Revúce as a striker. He previously competed for FK Pohronie in the Fortuna Liga.
