= Lucas Demitra =

Slovak footballer

Personal information
- Full name: Lucas Demitra
- Date of birth: 9 April 2003 (age 23)
- Place of birth: St. Louis, Missouri, U.S.
- Height: 1.81 m (5 ft 11 in)
- Position: Winger

Team information
- Current team: Třinec

Youth career
- 2010–2020: AS Trenčín

Senior career*
Years	Team	Apps	(Gls)
2021–2024	AS Trenčín	26	(2)
2021	→ Dubnica nad Váhom (loan)	2	(1)
2023	→ Zlaté Moravce (loan)	7	(0)
2024–2025	St. Louis City 2	10	(0)
2026	Neusiedl am See	14	(3)
2026–	Třinec	0	(0)

International career
- Slovakia U18
- * Club domestic league appearances and goals as of 28 June 2026

Lucas Demitra (born 9 April 2003) is a Slovak footballer who plays as a winger for Czech National Football League club Třinec.

== Early life ==
Demitra is the son of Slovak ice hockey player Pavol Demitra and Mária Demitrová. He was born in St. Louis, Missouri, United States, where his father played for the St. Louis Blues of the National Hockey League. Before dedicating himself to professional football, Demitra followed his father's footsteps and tried ice hockey at youth levels. Demitra was eight years old when his father died in the crash of YAK-Service Flight 9633.

== Club career ==
=== Trenčín ===
Demitra made his Fortuna Liga debut for AS Trenčín against FC DAC 1904 Dunajská Streda on 14 February 2021.

=== Třinec ===
On 8 September 2026, Demitra signed a contract with Czech National Football League club Třinec.
