= Michal Dopater =

Slovak footballer

Personal information
- Full name: Michal Dopater
- Date of birth: 26 February 2001 (age 25)
- Place of birth: Slovakia
- Position: Attacking midfielder

Team information
- Current team: FK Humenné

Youth career
- 2010–2012: Námestovo
- 2012–2019: Ružomberok

Senior career*
| Years | Team | Apps | (Gls) |
| 2019 | Ružomberok B | 16 | (4) |
| 2020– | Ružomberok | 12 | (1) |
| 2020–2021 | → Petržalka (loan) | 17 | (1) |
| 2022 | → Partizán Bardejov (loan) | 12 | (0) |
| 2023– | → FK Humenné (loan) | 11 | (0) |

International career^{‡}
| 2018 | Slovakia U17 | 2 | (0) |
- * Club domestic league appearances and goals as of 23 May 2023 ‡ National team caps and goals as of 18 March 2018

Michal Dopater (born 26 February 2001) is a Slovak professional footballer who currently plays as a midfielder for FK Humenné, on loan from MFK Ružomberok.

== Club career ==
=== MFK Ružomberok ===
Dopater made his Fortuna Liga debut for Ružomberok against Nitra on 22 August 2020, replacing Štefan Gerec in the 2nd half.
