= Mníchova Lehota =

- Municipality
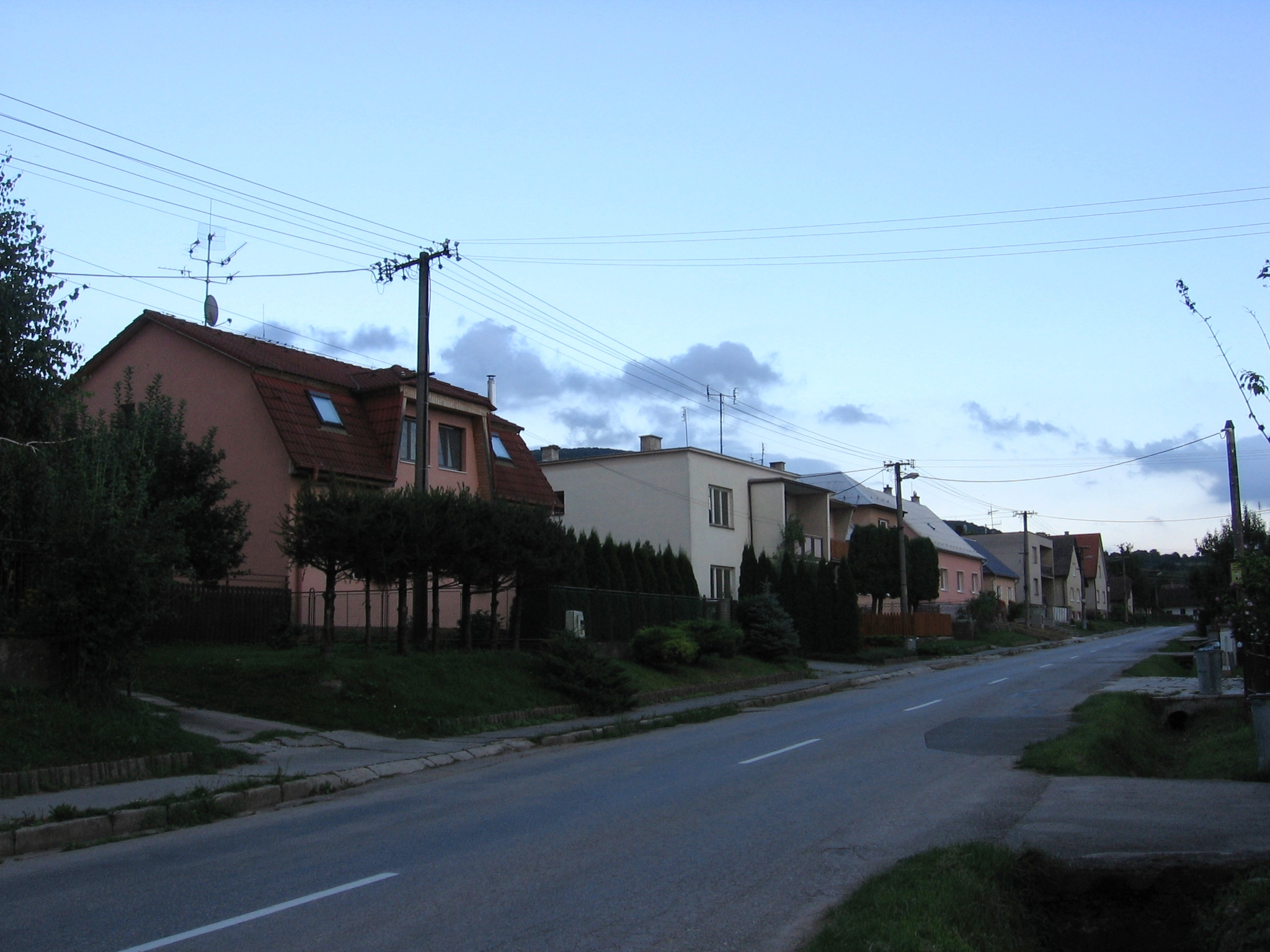

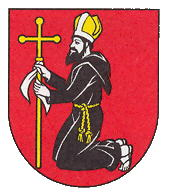
- Flag Coat of arms

- Location of Mníchova Lehota in the Trenčín Region Location of Mníchova Lehota in Slovakia
- Coordinates: 48.83°N 18.07°E
- Country: Slovakia
- Region: Trenčín Region
- District: Trenčín District
- First mentioned: 1439

Area
  - Total: 16.61 km^{2} (6.41 sq mi)
- Elevation: 255 m (837 ft)

Population (2025)
  - Total: 1,230
- Time zone: UTC+1 (CET)
  - Summer (DST): UTC+2 (CEST)
- Postal code: 913 21
- Area code: +421 32
- Vehicle registration plate (until 2022): TN
- Website: www.mnichovalehota.sk

Mníchova Lehota (Hungarian: Barátszabadi) is a village and municipality in Trenčín District in the Trenčín Region of north-western Slovakia.

== History ==
In historical records the village was first mentioned in 1269.

== Geography ==
The municipality lies at an altitude of 255 metres (837 ft) and covers an area of 16.61 km^{2} (6.41 sq mi) (2025).

== Population ==
Population statistic (10 years)
Year	1995	2005	2015	2025
Count	1118	1106	1221	1230
Difference		−1.07%	+10.39%	+0.73%

Population statistic
Year	2024	2025
Count	1217	1230
Difference		+1.06%

It has a population of 1230 people (31 December 2025).

=== Ethnicity ===
Census 2021 (1+ %)
Ethnicity	Number	Fraction
Slovak	1202	98.44%
Total	1221	

In year 2021 was 1221 people by ethnicity 1202 as Slovak, 10 as Not found out, 9 as Czech, 4 as Rusyn, 4 as Hungarian, 1 as Polish, 1 as Other and 1 as English.

Note on population: The difference values of population numbers in the table "Population statistic" and in the sections "Ethnicity" & "Religion" is caused by the use of various statistical methods.

=== Religion ===
Census 2021 (1+ %)
Religion	Number	Fraction
Roman Catholic Church	916	75.02%
None	229	18.76%
Evangelical Church	26	2.13%
Not found out	20	1.64%
Total	1221	

In year 2021 was 1221 people by religion 916 from Roman Catholic Church, 229 from None, 26 from Evangelical Church, 20 from Not found out, 7 from Greek Catholic Church, 5 from Paganism and natural spirituality, 4 from Other, 4 from Ad hoc movements, 3 from Calvinist Church, 2 from Islam, 1 from Eastern Orthodox Church, 1 from Other and not ascertained christian church, 1 from Christian Congregations in Slovakia, 1 from Czechoslovak Hussite Church and 1 from Buddhism.
