= Yann Michael Yao =

Ivorian footballer

Yann Yao
Personal information
- Full name: Yann Michael Yao
- Date of birth: 20 June 1997 (age 29)
- Place of birth: Dabou, Ivory Coast
- Height: 1.79 m (5 ft 10 in)
- Position: Winger

Team information
- Current team: Mornar
- Number: 11

Senior career*
Years	Team	Apps	(Gls)
- Denguélé
2017	Floridsdorfer AC	1	(0)
2018–2019	Paide Linnameeskond	61	(15)
2020–2021	Spartak Trnava	35	(2)
2021–2022	Sereď	27	(2)
2022–2024	Skalica	57	(7)
2025–	Mornar	41	(6)
- * Club domestic league appearances and goals as of 17 June 2026

Yann Michael Yao (born 20 June 1997) is an Ivorian footballer who plays for Montenegrin First League club Mornar as a winger.

== Club career ==
He made his Austrian Football Second League debut for Floridsdorfer AC on 18 August 2017 in a game against Kapfenberger SV.

== Honours ==
Individual

- Meistriliiga Player of the Month: August 2019
