= Samuel Benovič =

Slovak footballer

Personal information
- Date of birth: 3 January 2001 (age 25)
- Place of birth: Trnava, Slovakia
- Height: 1.78 m (5 ft 10 in)
- Position: Midfielder

Team information
- Current team: Malženice
- Number: 8

Youth career
- TJ Iskra Horné Orešany
- 2012–2013: Spartak Trnava
- 2014: SFM Senec
- 2014–2015: Gabčíkovo
- 2015–2020: Spartak Trnava

Senior career*
Years	Team	Apps	(Gls)
2020−2024	Spartak Trnava	17	(0)
2020	→ Petržalka (loan)	1	(0)
2022−2023	→ Spartak Myjava (loan)	35	(1)
2024	→ Malženice (loan)	13	(0)
2024–	Malženice	26	(1)

International career^{‡}
2017	Slovakia U16	3	(0)
2019	Slovakia U18	0	(0)
- * Club domestic league appearances and goals as of 18 January 2026 ‡ National team caps and goals as of 21 May 2019

Samuel Benovič (born 3 January 2001) is a Slovak footballer who plays as a midfielder for 2nd division club Dynamo Malženice.

== Club career ==
=== Spartak Trnava ===
On 9 July 2020, Benovič signed his first professional contract with Spartak Trnava.

Benovič made his professional Fortuna Liga debut for Spartak Trnava against MFK Ružomberok on 4 July 2020, coming on as a substitute in the 71” minute for Alex Sobczyk. In his time with Spartak, he played 17 games in which he was unable to score a goal.

=== Dynamo Malženice ===
On 29 February 2024, it was announced that Benovič would be joining Spartak’s feeder club Dynamo Malženice. On 12 June 2022, Benovič played in a 2:0 loss against FK Slovan Levice, where he was unable to convert a penalty.

== Honours ==
Spartak Trnava

- Slovak Cup: 2021–22
