= Daniel Ściślak =

Polish footballer (born 2000)

Personal information
- Full name: Daniel Ściślak
- Date of birth: 13 March 2000 (age 26)
- Place of birth: Jastrzębie-Zdrój, Poland
- Height: 1.77 m (5 ft 10 in)
- Position: Midfielder

Team information
- Current team: Rekord Bielsko-Biała
- Number: 6

Youth career
- MOSiR Jastrzębie Zdrój
- 2012–2013: Jarota Jarocin
- 2013–2014: Lech Poznań
- 2014–2016: MOSiR Jastrzębie Zdrój
- 2016–2017: Górnik Zabrze

Senior career*
Years	Team	Apps	(Gls)
2017–2023	Górnik Zabrze II	57	(10)
2019–2023	Górnik Zabrze	42	(1)
2021–2022	→ Pohronie (loan)	13	(0)
2022	→ Chojniczanka Chojnice (loan)	6	(0)
2023–2025	Polonia Bytom	65	(7)
2025–	Rekord Bielsko-Biała	31	(1)

International career
2019–2020	Poland U21	2	(0)
- * Club domestic league appearances and goals as of 11:13, 31 May 2026 (UTC)

Daniel Ściślak (born 13 March 2000) is a Polish professional footballer who plays as a midfielder for II liga club Rekord Bielsko-Biała.

== Club career ==
=== Pohronie ===
On 6 August 2021, Ściślak's loan at Žiar nad Hronom-based Pohronie of the Slovak Fortuna Liga was announced. Ściślak was to spend a year in the club, where he was to join Aleksander Paluszek, who was loaned there from Górnik Zabrze earlier.

Ściślak made his league debut for Pohronie against then yet-undefeated Žilina at pod Dubňom on 8 August 2021. He was featured in the starting line-up, with his team trailing after a first-minute goal by Timotej Jambor and two second-half strikes by Vahan Bichakhchyan, with the sole goal for Pohronie scored by Ladji Mallé.

== Honours ==
Górnik Zabrze II

- Polish Cup (Zabrze regionals); 2018–19, 2022–23

Polonia Bytom

- II liga: 2024–25
