= Rastislav Kružliak =

Slovak footballer

Personal information
- Full name: Rastislav Kružliak
- Date of birth: 11 July 1999 (age 27)
- Place of birth: Slovakia
- Height: 1.86 m (6 ft 1 in)
- Position: Forward

Team information
- Current team: UFC Tadten
- Number: 8

Youth career
- –2013: FC 34 Liptovský Mikuláš - Palúdzka
- 2010–2011: → Ružomberok (loan)
- 2012–2013: → Tatran Liptovský Mikuláš (loan)
- 2013–2018: MFK Ružomberok

Senior career*
Years	Team	Apps	(Gls)
2018–	Ružomberok	11	(0)
2021-	UFC Tadten	51	(38)

International career^{‡}
2017	Slovakia U18	5	(1)
- * Club domestic league appearances and goals as of 29 December 2019 ‡ National team caps and goals as of 21 January 2017

Rastislav Kružliak (born 11 July 1999) is a Slovak professional footballer who plays for UFC Tadten as a forward. His cousin, Dominik Kružliak is playing for DAC Dunajská Streda.

== Club career ==
Kružliak made his professional Fortuna Liga debut for Ružomberok in matchday one fixture of 2018–19 Fortuna liga season against iClinic Sereď on 21 July 2018. The match concluded as a goal-less tie. Kružliak came on the pitch in the 74th minute, replacing Tihomir Kostadinov. By the end of the season Kružliak had made 8 league appearances (plus 2 in Slovanft Cup), but always as a substituting player.

He made a transfer to Austrian fifth league side UFC Tadten in 2022. In July 2023 he scored a game-winning goal in the fourth minute of added time against USV Halbturn and helped his team stay in the league on the last matchday.
