= Kristián Mihálek =

Slovak under-21 international footballer

Personal information
- Full name: Kristián Mihálek
- Date of birth: 10 March 2000 (age 26)
- Place of birth: Bratislava, Slovakia
- Height: 1.75 m (5 ft 9 in)
- Positions: Winger; right back

Team information
- Current team: Inter Bratislava
- Number: 2

Youth career
- ŠKP Dúbravka
- FKM Karlova Ves Bratislava
- 2012–2015: Petržalka
- 2015–2019: Spartak Trnava

Senior career*
Years	Team	Apps	(Gls)
2019−2021	Spartak Trnava	10	(0)
2020	→ Pohronie (loan)	0	(0)
2020−2021	→ Petržalka (loan)	32	(0)
2022–2023	Skalica	5	(0)
2022	→ Sereď (loan)	10	(1)
2023	→ Rača (loan)	9	(0)
2023–2024	Považská Bystrica	26	(0)
2024–	Inter Bratislava	55	(2)

International career
2018	Slovakia U19	4	(1)
2021	Slovakia U21	2	(0)
- * Club domestic league appearances and goals as of 25 May 2026

Kristián Mihálek (born 10 March 2000) is a Slovak footballer who plays for Inter Bratislava in 2. Liga as a right back.

== Club career ==
=== Spartak Trnava ===
Mihálek made his Fortuna Liga debut for Spartak Trnava against Nitra at pod Zoborom on 18 May 2019. Mihálek was featured in the starting line-up and played the entire game, which Trnava won after a second-half goal by David Depetris.

==== Loan to Pohronie ====
Mihálek had joined Pohronie in February 2020 on a half-season agreement. He failed to make an appearance in the club as he returned from the loan.
