= Ahmad Ghali =

Nigerian footballer

Personal information
- Full name: Ahmad Abubakar Ghali
- Date of birth: 23 June 2000 (age 26)
- Place of birth: Kano, Nigeria
- Height: 1.70 m (5 ft 7 in)
- Position: Right winger

Team information
- Current team: Sigma Olomouc
- Number: 70

Youth career
- MFM FC

Senior career*
Years	Team	Apps	(Gls)
2020–2021	AS Trenčín	50	(5)
2021	→ Dubnica (loan)	3	(1)
2022–2025	Slovan Liberec	79	(4)
2025–	Sigma Olomouc	21	(3)
- * Club domestic league appearances and goals as of 26 May 2026

Ahmad Abubakar Ghali (born 23 June 2000) is a Nigerian footballer who plays for Sigma Olomouc as a right winger.

== Club career ==
=== Trenčín ===
Ghali made his Fortuna Liga debut for AS Trenčín against FK Pohronie on 13 June 2020.

=== Sigma Olomouc ===
On 2 September 2025, Ghali signed a three-year contract with Sigma Olomouc with a one-year option.
