= Ramón (footballer, born 1990) =

Brazilian footballer

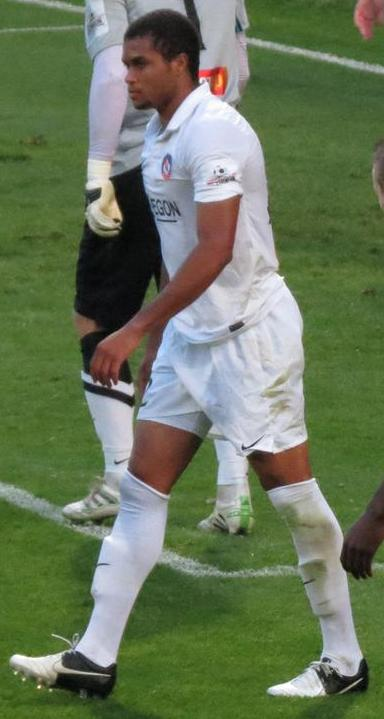
- Ramón in 2012

Personal information
- Full name: Ramón Rodrígues da Silva
- Date of birth: 22 August 1990 (age 36)
- Place of birth: Ipiaú, Brazil
- Height: 1.82 m (6 ft 0 in)
- Position: Centre back

Youth career
- Bahia
- 2009–2010: AZ Alkmaar

Senior career*
Years	Team	Apps	(Gls)
2010–2011	AZ Alkmaar	0	(0)
2011	Itabuna	7	(0)
2012–2015	AS Trenčín	77	(3)
2015–2016	Nordsjælland	29	(1)
2016–2019	SønderjyskE	28	(0)
2020	Wacker Innsbruck II	?	(?)
2021–2022	AS Trenčín	6	(0)
2022	→ Púchov (loan)	8	(2)
- * Club domestic league appearances and goals as of 22 June 2021

Ramón Rodríguez da Silva (born 22 August 1990), known as Ramón, is a Brazilian professional footballer who plays as a centre back.

== AS Trenčín ==
Ramón joined AS Trenčín in winter 2012, but only signed a contract with the Corgoň Liga club in the summer of 2012. He made his debut for Trenčín against Nitra on 14 July 2012, when he played the entire 90 minutes in a 5–0 win at na Sihoti.

== Career statistics ==
As of 21 June 2014

Appearances and goals by club, season and competition
Club	Season	League			Cup		Europe		Total	
Club	Season	Division	Apps	Goals	Apps	Goals	Apps	Goals	Apps	Goals
AS Trenčín	2012–13	Corgoň Liga	30	0	2	0	0	0	32	0
AS Trenčín	2013–14	Corgoň Liga	18	0	1	0	4	0	23	0
Career total			48	0	3	0	4	0	55	0
