= Saymon Cabral =

Brazilian footballer

Personal information
- Full name: Saymon de Barros Cabral
- Date of birth: 9 July 2001 (age 25)
- Place of birth: Chapecó, Brazil
- Height: 1.70 m (5 ft 7 in)
- Position: Winger

Team information
- Current team: Dibba
- Number: 77

Youth career
- Avaí
- 2019−2020: → Spartak Trnava (loan)

Senior career*
Years	Team	Apps	(Gls)
2019–2022	Avaí		
2020−2022	→ Spartak Trnava (loan)	54	(12)
2022	→ Khor Fakkan (loan)	10	(0)
2022–2024	Khor Fakkan	19	(1)
2023−2024	→ Al Urooba (loan)		
2024−	Dibba		
- * Club domestic league appearances and goals as of 16:45, 9 October 2022 (UTC)

Saymon de Barros Cabral (born 9 July 2001) is a Brazilian footballer who plays as a winger for Emirati club Dibba.

== Club career ==
=== Spartak Trnava ===
Cabral joined Spartak Trnava in September 2019, initially starting in youth team and reserves. He made his first-team Fortuna Liga debut against Žilina on 14 June 2020. In March 2021, it was announced that he would be extending his loan at Trnava to a further year. In January 2022, it was announced that Cabral would be joining Khor Fakkan after deciding not to sign a permanent contract with Spartak Trnava. He played a total of 63 games for the Slovak side, scoring 13 goals.

== Honours ==
Individual

- Slovak Super Liga U-21 Team of the Season: 2020-21
