= Aleksander Paluszek =

Polish footballer (born 2001)

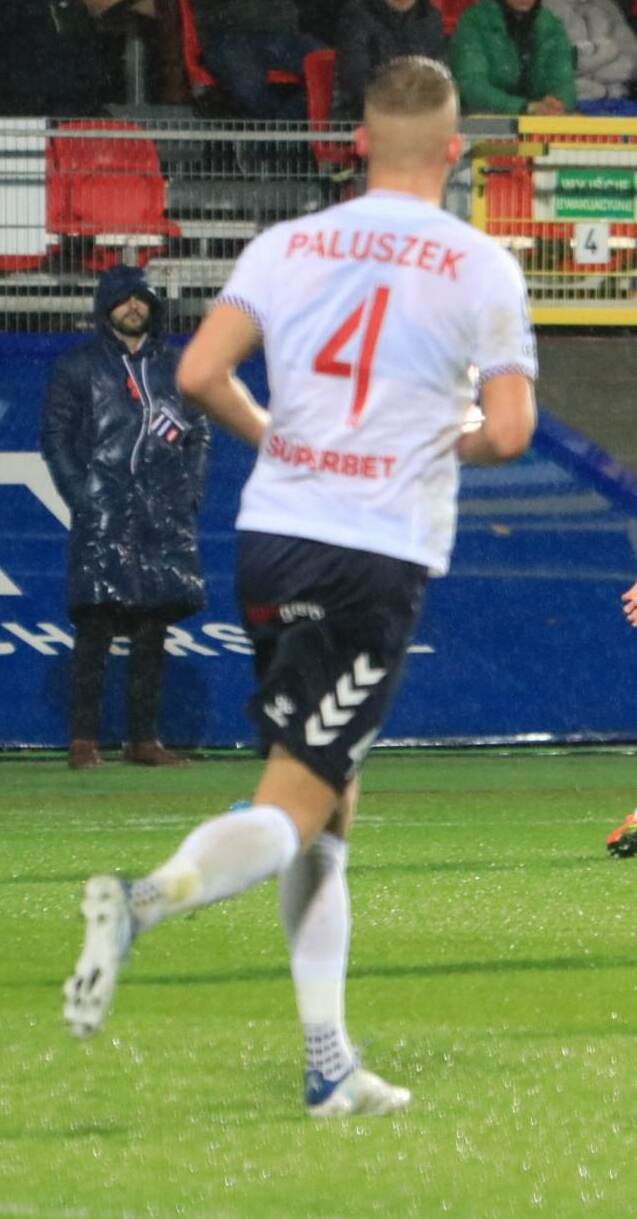
- Paluszek playing for Górnik Zabrze in 2023

Personal information
- Full name: Aleksander Paluszek
- Date of birth: 9 April 2001 (age 25)
- Place of birth: Wrocław, Poland
- Height: 1.91 m (6 ft 3 in)
- Position: Centre-back

Team information
- Current team: GKS Katowice
- Number: 3

Youth career
- –2018: Śląsk Wrocław

Senior career*
| Years | Team | Apps | (Gls) |
| 2018–2019 | Śląsk Wrocław II | 3 | (3) |
| 2019–2023 | Górnik Zabrze II | 17 | (2) |
| 2019–2023 | Górnik Zabrze | 32 | (3) |
| 2021–2022 | → Pohronie (loan) | 10 | (1) |
| 2022 | → Skra Częstochowa (loan) | 14 | (1) |
| 2023–2025 | Śląsk Wrocław | 35 | (2) |
| 2023–2024 | Śląsk Wrocław II | 5 | (0) |
| 2025– | GKS Katowice | 1 | (0) |

International career
| 2019 | Poland U18 | 2 | (0) |
| 2021–2022 | Poland U20 | 3 | (1) |
| 2021 | Poland U21 | 1 | (0) |
- * Club domestic league appearances and goals as of 10:10, 30 May 2026 (UTC)

Aleksander Paluszek (born 9 April 2001) is a Polish professional footballer who plays as a centre-back for Ekstraklasa club GKS Katowice.

== Club career ==
On 16 July 2021, Paluszek was loaned from Górnik Zabrze to Pohronie, but was released during winter break.

On 1 August 2023, Paluszek returned to Śląsk Wrocław on a two-year contract with an option for a third year.

He transferred to GKS Katowice in summer 2025. On 9 September 2025, Paluszek suffered an injury during a friendly match against Górnik Zabrze. Following detailed medical examinations, he was diagnosed with a torn ligament in his right knee.

== Honours ==
Śląsk Wrocław II

- III liga, group III: 2024–25
- IV liga Lower Silesia East: 2018–19

Individual

- Ekstraklasa Young Player of the Month: August 2022
