= List of Slovak football transfers summer 2023 =

Notable Slovak football transfers in the summer transfer window 2023 by club. Only transfers of the Fortuna Liga and 2. liga are included.

== Fortuna Liga ==
=== ŠK Slovan Bratislava ===
In: Note: Flags indicate national team as defined under FIFA eligibility rules; some limited exceptions apply. Players may hold more than one non-FIFA nationality.

No.	Pos.	Nation	Player
88	MF	GRE	Kyriakos Savvidis (from FC Spartak Trnava)
—	DF	AUT	Kevin Wimmer (from Free agent)
—	DF	PAN	César Blackman (from Free Agent)
24	MF	CRO	Marko Tolić (on loan from (Croatia) GNK Dinamo Zagreb)
82	GK	CAN	Milan Borjan (on loan from (Serbia) Red Star Belgrade)
13	FW	SVK	David Strelec (on loan from (Italy) Spezia Calcio)

Out: Note: Flags indicate national team as defined under FIFA eligibility rules; some limited exceptions apply. Players may hold more than one non-FIFA nationality.

No.	Pos.	Nation	Player
—	FW	SVN	Žan Medved (to FC Košice)
—	MF	SVK	David Hrnčár (to (Belgium) S.K. Beveren)
—	DF	CZE	Jurij Medveděv (to (Russia) PFC Sochi)
—	MF	HUN	Dávid Holman (Released and joined (Hungary) Budapest Honvéd FC)
—	GK	SVK	Michal Šulla (Released)
—	GK	SVK	Matúš Ružinský (Released and joined MFK Zemplín Michalovce)
—	DF	ARG	Vernon De Marco (to (United Arab Emirates) Hatta Club)
—	GK	SVK	Adrián Chovan (Released and joined (Greece) Panserraikos F.C.)
—	FW	ENG	Andre Green (End of contract - joined (England) Rotherham United F.C.)
—	MF	GEO	Giorgi Chakvetadze (Loan return to (Belgium) K.A.A. Gent)
—	DF	GAM	Maudo Jarjué (End of loan)
2	DF	BEL	Siemen Voet (on loan to (Netherlands) Fortuna Sittard)
9	FW	SRB	Ivan Šaponjić (on loan to (Turkey) Ümraniyespor)
17	FW	SUI	Adler Da Silva (on loan to (Poland) Stal Rzeszów)

=== FC DAC 1904 Dunajská Streda ===
In: Note: Flags indicate national team as defined under FIFA eligibility rules; some limited exceptions apply. Players may hold more than one non-FIFA nationality.

No.	Pos.	Nation	Player
—	DF	ARG	Luciano Vera (loan return from (Argentina) Deportivo Maipú)
—	MF	CRO	Andrija Balić (loan return from MFK Dukla Banská Bystrica)
—	DF	CZE	Filip Kaša (from (Czech Republic) FC Viktoria Plzeň)
—	MF	CZE	Aleš Čermák (from (Czech Republic) FC Viktoria Plzeň)
—	DF	POL	Konrad Gruszkowski (from (Poland) Wisła Kraków)
—	FW	SVK	Matej Trusa (from (Czech Republic) FC Viktoria Plzeň)
—	GK	HUN	Erik Gyurákovics (on loan from FC ŠTK 1914 Šamorín)
—	DF	SVK	Norbert Urblík (from (Hungary) Győri ETO FC)
24	MF	SVK	Christián Herc (from (Switzerland) Grasshopper Club Zürich)
—	GK	SRB	Aleksandar Popović (from (Serbia) FK Partizan)
11	FW	CRO	Bartol Barišić (from (Croatia) Dinamo Zagreb)
—	MF	VEN	Andrés Romero (on loan from (Venezuela) Monagas S.C.)
—	FW	CIV	Fernand Gouré (on loan from (Belgium) K.V.C. Westerlo)
—	FW	HUN	Damir Redzic (on loan from (Hungary) Ferencvárosi TC II)

Out: Note: Flags indicate national team as defined under FIFA eligibility rules; some limited exceptions apply. Players may hold more than one non-FIFA nationality.

No.	Pos.	Nation	Player
1	GK	POR	Ricardo Ferreira (Released)
4	MF	MKD	Enis Fazlagić (loan return to (Poland) Wisła Kraków)
5	DF	AUT	Ahmet Muhamedbegović (Released and joined (Slovenia) Olimpija Ljubljana)
21	FW	GER	Brahim Moumou (Released)
77	MF	SVK	Sebastian Nebyla (Released and joined (Croatia) NK Istra 1961)
—	MF	CRO	Andrija Balić (Released and joined (Bosnia and Herzegovina) HŠK Zrinjski Mostar)
—	DF	PAN	Eric Davis (Released and joined (United States) D.C. United)
—	DF	PAN	César Blackman (Released and joined ŠK Slovan Bratislava)
—	DF	SVK	Dominik Kružliak (Released and joined (Greece) Volos F.C.)
—	FW	HUN	Norbert Balogh (on loan to (Hungary) Kisvárda FC)
—	FW	MNE	Matija Krivokapić (to (Hungary) Győri ETO FC)
—	DF	ARG	Luciano Vera (to (Hungary) Győri ETO FC)
—	MF	HUN	Zsolt Kalmár (to (Hungary) Fehérvár FC)
—	FW	MNE	Nikola Krstović (to (Italy) US Lecce)

=== FC Spartak Trnava ===
In: Note: Flags indicate national team as defined under FIFA eligibility rules; some limited exceptions apply. Players may hold more than one non-FIFA nationality.

No.	Pos.	Nation	Player
—	MF	NGA	Philip Azango (from AS Trenčín)
—	MF	SRB	Filip Bainović (from AS Trenčín)
—	DF	SVN	Miha Kompan Breznik (from (Slovenia) NŠ Mura)
—	DF	SVK	Martin Šulek (from (Poland) Wisła Płock)
—	FW	AUT	Marco Djuricin (on loan from (Croatia) HNK Rijeka)
—	DF	ARG	Nicolás Gorosito (from FK Dukla Banská Bystrica)
—	MF	SVN	Adrian Zeljković (from (Slovenia) NK Tabor Sežana)
—	MF	CRC	Ricardo Peña (on loan from (Costa Rica) Fútbol Consultants)
—	MF	SVK	Ján Bernát (on loan from (Belgium) K.V.C. Westerlo)
—	DF	SRB	Andrej Đurić (on loan from (Serbia) Red Star Belgrade)
—	FW	SVK	Michal Ďuriš (on loan from (Cyprus) Othellos Athienou FC)
—	GK	SVK	Michal Šulla (from ŠK Slovan Bratislava)

Out: Note: Flags indicate national team as defined under FIFA eligibility rules; some limited exceptions apply. Players may hold more than one non-FIFA nationality.

No.	Pos.	Nation	Player
12	FW	NGA	Abdulrahman Taiwo (loan return to (Denmark) Sønderjyske Fodbold)
19	DF	SVK	Matej Čurma (Released and joined (Czech Republic) MFK Karviná)
22	MF	SVK	Alex Iván (Released and joined (Czech Republic) MFK Karviná)
33	DF	CZE	Filip Twardzik (loan return to (Austria) LASK)
88	MF	GRE	Kyriakos Savvidis (Released and joined Slovan Bratislava)
91	MF	BRA	Dyjan de Azevedo (Released)
—	DF	SVK	Gergely Tumma (previously on loan and joined FC ViOn Zlaté Moravce)
—	DF	SVK	Mário Mihál (previously on loan and joined FK Hodonín)
—	MF	SVK	Peter Kolesár (previously on loan and joined (Poland) Chojniczanka Chojnice)
—	FW	GHA	Kelvin Boateng (previously on loan and joined (Austria) First Vienna FC)
—	FW	SVK	Stanislav Olejník (previously on loan and joined Šamorín)

=== FK Železiarne Podbrezová ===
In: Note: Flags indicate national team as defined under FIFA eligibility rules; some limited exceptions apply. Players may hold more than one non-FIFA nationality.

No.	Pos.	Nation	Player
—	MF	GAM	Mahmudu Bajo (from (The Gambia) FC Tallinding)
—	DF	SVK	Boris Godál (loan return from (Saudi Arabia) Al-Adalah FC)
—	MF	NGA	Ridwan Sanusi (from FK Pohronie)
—	MF	SVK	Roland Galčík (from MŠK Žilina)
—	FW	UKR	Dmytro Laktionov (from FK Pohronie)
—	FW	GHA	Mark Assinor (from (Poland) Garbarnia Kraków)

Out: Note: Flags indicate national team as defined under FIFA eligibility rules; some limited exceptions apply. Players may hold more than one non-FIFA nationality.

No.	Pos.	Nation	Player
—	DF	SVK	Boris Godál (Released and joined FK Dukla Banská Bystrica)
—	GK	CZE	Matěj Luksch (loan return to (Czech Republic) SK Dynamo České Budějovice)
—	MF	SVK	Vladimír Kukoľ (End of professional career)
—	DF	SVK	Richard Hečko (on loan to FK Pohronie)
—	DF	SVK	Dávid Ovšonka (on loan to FK Pohronie)
—	DF	SVK	Alex Molčan (on loan to FK Pohronie)
—	MF	SVK	Damián Bariš (to AS Trenčín)
—	FW	SVK	Daniel Pavúk (to MFK Zemplín Michalovce)
—	FW	CIV	Moussa Sangare (Released and joined (Georgia (country)) FC Dinamo Tbilisi)
—	MF	SRB	Mirsad Miraljemović (Released)
—	DF	SVK	Nicolas Šikula (to FK Pohronie)
—	FW	SVK	Adam Horvát (to FK Pohronie)

=== MFK Dukla Banská Bystrica ===
In: Note: Flags indicate national team as defined under FIFA eligibility rules; some limited exceptions apply. Players may hold more than one non-FIFA nationality.

No.	Pos.	Nation	Player
—	MF	SVK	Oliver Klimpl (from MFK Dukla Banská Bystrica U19)
—	MF	SVK	Tibor Slebodník (from MŠK Žilina)
—	DF	SVK	Boris Godál (from FK Železiarne Podbrezová)
—	GK	SVK	Michal Trnovský (from FC ŠTK 1914 Šamorín)
—	MF	BRA	João Guimarães (from MFK Snina)
—	MF	SVK	Marek Hlinka (from (Czech Republic) FC Zlín)
—	DF	SVK	Šimon Mičuda (on loan from AS Trenčín)
—	MF	ESP	Enzo Arevalo (from (Italy) US Agropoli 1921)
—	DF	COL	Tomás Maya (from Free Agent)

Out: Note: Flags indicate national team as defined under FIFA eligibility rules; some limited exceptions apply. Players may hold more than one non-FIFA nationality.

No.	Pos.	Nation	Player
—	DF	SVK	Adrián Slávik (to (Czech Republic) FK Jablonec)
—	MF	CRO	Andrija Balić (loan return to FC DAC 1904 Dunajská Streda)
—	MF	SVK	Michal Faško (Released and joined FC Košice)
—	DF	SVK	Ľuboš Kupčík (Released)
—	DF	ARG	Nicolás Ezequiel Gorosito (Released)
—	GK	SVK	Filip Baláž (Released)
—	FW	SVK	Matej Franko (to (Czech Republic) MFK Karviná)
—	FW	SVK	Adam Červeň (to (Czech Republic) MFK Vyškov)
—	FW	SVK	Dávid Jackuliak (to MFK Ružomberok)

=== MŠK Žilina ===
In: Note: Flags indicate national team as defined under FIFA eligibility rules; some limited exceptions apply. Players may hold more than one non-FIFA nationality.

No.	Pos.	Nation	Player
—	MF	SVK	Patrik Myslovič (loan return from (Scotland) Aberdeen F.C.)
—	MF	SVK	Tibor Slebodník (loan return from MFK Zemplín Michalovce)
—	DF	SVK	Richard Nagy (loan return from FC Tatran Prešov)
—	MF	SVK	Miroslav Gono (loan return from (Poland) Wisła Płock)
15	DF	SVK	Tomáš Hubočan (from (Cyprus) Karmiotissa Polemidion FC)

Out: Note: Flags indicate national team as defined under FIFA eligibility rules; some limited exceptions apply. Players may hold more than one non-FIFA nationality.

No.	Pos.	Nation	Player
—	MF	SVK	Adrián Kaprálik (on loan to (Poland) Górnik Zabrze)
—	FW	SRB	Boris Krstić (on loan to (Serbia) FK Spartak Subotica)
—	DF	SVK	Samuel Kopásek (on loan to Tatran Prešov)
—	DF	GHA	Benson Anang (Released and joined (Cyprus) Othellos Athienou FC)
—	MF	SVK	Roland Galčík (to FK Železiarne Podbrezová)
—	GK	SVK	Matej Slávik (loan return to MŠK Považská Bystrica)
—	DF	SVK	Richard Nagy (to FC ViOn Zlaté Moravce)
—	MF	SVK	Miroslav Gono (to FC ViOn Zlaté Moravce)
—	MF	SVK	Tibor Slebodník (to MFK Dukla Banská Bystrica)

=== MFK Ružomberok ===
In: Note: Flags indicate national team as defined under FIFA eligibility rules; some limited exceptions apply. Players may hold more than one non-FIFA nationality.

No.	Pos.	Nation	Player
—	DF	SVK	Juraj Kotula (from MFK Zemplín Michalovce)
—	MF	SVK	Timotej Múdry (loan return from FC ViOn Zlaté Moravce)
—	MF	SVK	Marián Chobot (from Slovan Bratislava B)
—	MF	SVK	Samuel Lavrinčík (from AS Trenčín)
—	FW	SVK	Dávid Jackuliak (from MFK Dukla Banská Bystrica)
—	FW	CZE	Jan Hladík (from (Czech Republic) FC Zbrojovka Brno)

Out: Note: Flags indicate national team as defined under FIFA eligibility rules; some limited exceptions apply. Players may hold more than one non-FIFA nationality.

No.	Pos.	Nation	Player
—	FW	SVK	Marko Kelemen (on loan to (Hungary) Szombathelyi Haladás FC)
—	DF	SVK	Alexander Mojžiš (on loan to (Hungary) Debreceni VSC)
—	DF	SVK	Matej Madleňák (on loan to (Czech Republic) FC Baník Ostrava)
—	MF	SVK	Jakub Rakyta (on loan to FC Tatran Prešov)
—	MF	SVK	Gabriel Halabrín (on loan to Spartak Myjava)
—	MF	SVK	Adrián Macejko (on loan to MFK Tatran Liptovský Mikuláš)
—	MF	SVK	Tobias Bujňaček (on loan to FK Slavoj Trebišov)
—	DF	SVK	Matúš Krištof (on loan to MŠK Rimavská Sobota)
—	FW	SVK	Matej Matúš (on loan to MŠK Rimavská Sobota)
—	DF	SVK	Lukáš Fabiš (to FC Košice)
9	FW	SVK	Tomáš Bobček (to (Poland) Lechia Gdańsk)

=== MFK Skalica ===
In: Note: Flags indicate national team as defined under FIFA eligibility rules; some limited exceptions apply. Players may hold more than one non-FIFA nationality.

No.	Pos.	Nation	Player
—	DF	BRA	Kauã Moura (from MFK Skalica U19)
—	DF	SVK	Michal Ranko (from MFK Zemplín Michalovce)
—	FW	AUT	Alex Sobczyk (from (Poland) Piast Gliwice)
—	DF	SVK	Róbert Matejov (from (Czech Republic) FC Zbrojovka Brno)
—	DF	COL	Brayam Palacios (from (Colombia) Unión Magdalena)

Out: Note: Flags indicate national team as defined under FIFA eligibility rules; some limited exceptions apply. Players may hold more than one non-FIFA nationality.

No.	Pos.	Nation	Player
—	GK	SVK	Igor Šemrinec (Released and joined FK Pohronie)
—	FW	SVN	Žan Medved (loan return to ŠK Slovan Bratislava)
—	FW	SVK	Jakub Švec (loan return to (Czech Republic) SK Dynamo České Budějovice)
—	DF	COL	Haiderson Hurtado (to (Czech Republic) FK Jablonec)
—	DF	SVK	Filip Blažek (to (Czech Republic) FC Baník Ostrava)
—	MF	SVK	Andrej Fábry (to (Romania) FC UTA Arad)
—	DF	SVK	Marek Václav (Released)

=== AS Trenčín ===
In: Note: Flags indicate national team as defined under FIFA eligibility rules; some limited exceptions apply. Players may hold more than one non-FIFA nationality.

No.	Pos.	Nation	Player
—	MF	NED	Azzam el Nasri (from (Netherlands) Excelsior U18)
—	MF	SVK	Damián Bariš (from FK Železiarne Podbrezová)
—	DF	UKR	Taras Bondarenko (from (Serbia) FK Radnik Surdulica)
—	DF	SVK	Lukáš Skovajsa (from (Czech Republic) SK Dynamo České Budějovice)

Out: Note: Flags indicate national team as defined under FIFA eligibility rules; some limited exceptions apply. Players may hold more than one non-FIFA nationality.

No.	Pos.	Nation	Player
—	DF	NGA	Kingsley Madu (Released)
—	MF	SVK	Samuel Lavrinčík (Released)
—	MF	NGA	Philip Azango (to FC Spartak Trnava)
—	MF	SVK	Lukáš Ďuriška (Released)
—	MF	SRB	Filip Bainović (Released and joined FC Spartak Trnava)
—	FW	SVK	Lukáš Letenay (Released)
—	FW	NGA	Lekan Okunola (Released)
—	DF	NGA	Reuben Yem (Released)
—	DF	SVK	Šimon Mičuda (on loan to MFK Dukla Banská Bystrica)
—	MF	NGA	Adewale Oladoye (on loan to (Latvia) FK RFS)

=== MFK Zemplín Michalovce ===
In: Note: Flags indicate national team as defined under FIFA eligibility rules; some limited exceptions apply. Players may hold more than one non-FIFA nationality.

No.	Pos.	Nation	Player
—	DF	SVK	Martin Bednár (from FC ViOn Zlaté Moravce)
—	FW	SVK	Daniel Pavúk (from FK Železiarne Podbrezová)
—	DF	SVK	Lukáš Šimko (from FC Tatran Prešov)
—	DF	GUI	Franck Bahi (on loan from FC ŠTK 1914 Šamorín)
—	GK	SVK	Matúš Ružinský (from Free agent)
—	MF	SVK	Stanislav Danko (from FK Slavoj Trebišov)
—	MF	SVK	Christián Steinhübel (from MFK Tatran Liptovský Mikuláš)
—	MF	UKR	Roman Karasyuk (from (Armenia) FC Pyunik)
—	MF	CUW	Gino van Kessel (from Free Agent)

Out: Note: Flags indicate national team as defined under FIFA eligibility rules; some limited exceptions apply. Players may hold more than one non-FIFA nationality.

No.	Pos.	Nation	Player
—	MF	NGA	Wisdom Kanu (Released)
—	DF	SVK	Michal Ranko (Released)
—	DF	SVK	Juraj Kotula (Released)
—	MF	ESP	Brian Peña (to (Latvia) Riga FC)
—	GK	UKR	Andriy Kozhukhar (Released and joined (Ukraine) FC Karpaty Lviv)
—	MF	ALB	Kristi Qose (Released and joined FC Košice (2018))
—	MF	SVK	Tibor Slebodník (loan return to MŠK Žilina)
—	DF	MNE	Zvonko Ceklić (to (Montenegro) FK Budućnost Podgorica)
—	MF	SVK	Matúš Begala (Released)
—	FW	MNE	Matija Krivokapić (loan return to FC DAC 1904 Dunajská Streda)
—	MF	GAM	Sainey Njie (loan return to FC DAC 1904 Dunajská Streda)

=== FC ViOn Zlaté Moravce ===
In: Note: Flags indicate national team as defined under FIFA eligibility rules; some limited exceptions apply. Players may hold more than one non-FIFA nationality.

No.	Pos.	Nation	Player
—	DF	SVK	Vladimír Majdan (from FC Košice)
—	FW	SVK	Jakub Švec (on loan from (Czech Republic) SK Dynamo České Budějovice)
—	GK	SVK	Matej Slávik (on loan from MŠK Považská Bystrica)
—	DF	SVK	Richard Nagy (from MŠK Žilina)
—	MF	SVK	Miroslav Gono (from MŠK Žilina)
—	DF	SVK	Matej Moško (from MŠK Púchov)
—	MF	SVK	Milan Kvocera (from (Poland) Wisła Płock)
—	DF	SVK	Gergely Tumma (from FC Spartak Trnava)
—	FW	CRO	Patrik Mijić (from Free Agent)
—	DF	SVK	Samuel Suľa (from MŠK Žilina)
—	MF	NGA	Johnson Nsumoh (from FC Slovan Galanta)
—	MF	ENG	James Weir (from (Hungary) MTK Budapest FC)

Out: Note: Flags indicate national team as defined under FIFA eligibility rules; some limited exceptions apply. Players may hold more than one non-FIFA nationality.

No.	Pos.	Nation	Player
—	GK	SVK	Patrik Lukáč (Released)
—	MF	MKD	Tomče Grozdanovski (to (North Macedonia) FK Rabotnichki)
—	DF	SVK	Martin Bednár (Released and joined MFK Zemplín Michalovce)
—	DF	BIH	Alden Šuvalija (loan return to (Czech Republic) 1. FC Slovácko)
—	FW	NGA	Kenneth Ikugar (loan return to FC Spartak Trnava)
—	MF	SVK	Lucas Demitra (loan return to AS Trenčín)
—	DF	SVK	Michal Pintér (to (North Macedonia) KF Shkupi)
—	DF	BRA	Stephano Almeida (Released)
—	FW	SVK	Tomáš Vestenický (Released)
—	DF	CZE	Martin Toml (Released)
—	FW	SVK	Patrik Pinte (Released)
—	MF	SVK	Timotej Múdry (loan return to MFK Ružomberok)
—	MF	SVK	Anton Sloboda (Released)
—	DF	UKR	Nazariy Havrylyuk (Released)

=== FC Košice ===
In: Note: Flags indicate national team as defined under FIFA eligibility rules; some limited exceptions apply. Players may hold more than one non-FIFA nationality.

No.	Pos.	Nation	Player
—	FW	SVN	Žan Medved (from ŠK Slovan Bratislava)
—	MF	SVK	Marcel Vasiľ (from (Poland) Bruk-Bet Termalica Nieciecza)
—	MF	ALB	Kristi Qose (from Free Agent)
—	MF	SVK	Michal Faško (from FK Dukla Banská Bystrica)
—	GK	SVK	Matúš Putnocký (from Free Agent)
—	MF	SVK	Lukáš Greššák (from Free Agent)
—	DF	SVK	Lukáš Fabiš (from MFK Ružomberok)
—	MF	BEN	Tidjani Anaane (from (Cyprus) Doxa Katokopias FC)
—	DF	SVK	Dominik Kružliak (from Free Agent)

Out: Note: Flags indicate national team as defined under FIFA eligibility rules; some limited exceptions apply. Players may hold more than one non-FIFA nationality.

No.	Pos.	Nation	Player
—	MF	SVK	Boris Gáll (on loan to FC Tatran Prešov)
—	FW	SVK	Samuel Gladiš (on loan to FC Tatran Prešov)
—	FW	CZE	Patrik Voleský (to KFC Komárno)
—	FW	MKD	Valmir Nafiu (loan return to (North Macedonia) KF Shkëndija)

== 2. liga ==
=== MFK Tatran Liptovský Mikuláš ===
In: Note: Flags indicate national team as defined under FIFA eligibility rules; some limited exceptions apply. Players may hold more than one non-FIFA nationality.

No.	Pos.	Nation	Player
—	DF	SVK	Andrej Štrba (from FK Pohronie)
—	DF	SVK	Matúš Capko (from MŠK Žilina B)
—	DF	SVK	Adrián Lehotský (from FC ŠTK 1914 Šamorín)

Out: Note: Flags indicate national team as defined under FIFA eligibility rules; some limited exceptions apply. Players may hold more than one non-FIFA nationality.

No.	Pos.	Nation	Player
—	DF	SRB	Mihajilo Popović (to FC Tatran Prešov)
—	DF	SVK	Richard Župa (to FC Tatran Prešov)
—	DF	SVK	Imrich Bedecs (to Spartak Myjava)
—	MF	SVK	Christián Steinhübel (to MFK Zemplín Michalovce)
—	MF	SRB	Strahinja Pavišić (to (Georgia (country)) FC Samtredia)
—	FW	SVK	René Dedič (loan return to (Czech Republic) FK Třinec)
—	MF	SVK	Rastislav Václavik (to (Poland) Sandecja Nowy Sącz)
—	GK	CZE	Denis Gröger (to TBA)
—	DF	CZE	Martin Nečas (to TBA)

=== FC Tatran Prešov ===
In: Note: Flags indicate national team as defined under FIFA eligibility rules; some limited exceptions apply. Players may hold more than one non-FIFA nationality.

No.	Pos.	Nation	Player
—	MF	SVK	Boris Gáll (on loan from FC Košice)
—	FW	SVK	Samuel Gladiš (on loan from FC Košice)
—	DF	SRB	Mihajilo Popović (from MFK Tatran Liptovský Mikuláš)
—	DF	SVK	Richard Župa (from MFK Tatran Liptovský Mikuláš)
—	DF	SVK	Patrik Šimko (from Free Agent)
—	MF	SEN	Aliou Diao (from (Czech Republic) FC Sellier & Bellot Vlašim)
—	MF	ESP	Mamadou Traore (from FC Nitra)
—	MF	SVK	Jakub Rakyta (on loan from MFK Ružomberok)

Out: Note: Flags indicate national team as defined under FIFA eligibility rules; some limited exceptions apply. Players may hold more than one non-FIFA nationality.

No.	Pos.	Nation	Player
—	DF	SVK	Lukáš Horváth (to FK Humenné)
—	DF	SVK	Ján Hatok (Released)
—	MF	SVK	Kamil Karaš (Released)
—	MF	SVK	Ľubomír Ivanko-Macej (Released)
—	FW	SRB	Marko Milunović (Released)
—	FW	SRB	Dragan Andrić (Released)
—	FW	POL	Dominik Sokół (loan return to (Poland) Radomiak Radom)
—	DF	POR	Tiago Matos (loan return to (Poland) Radomiak Radom)
—	DF	SVK	Richard Nagy (loan return to MŠK Žilina)
—	DF	SVK	Lukáš Šimko (to MFK Zemplín Michalovce)
—	MF	SVK	Martin Pribula (to FK Spišská Nová Ves)

=== KFC Komárno ===
In: Note: Flags indicate national team as defined under FIFA eligibility rules; some limited exceptions apply. Players may hold more than one non-FIFA nationality.

No.	Pos.	Nation	Player
—	GK	SVK	Filip Dlubáč (from FK Železiarne Podbrezová)
—	FW	CZE	Patrik Voleský (from FC Košice)

Out: Note: Flags indicate national team as defined under FIFA eligibility rules; some limited exceptions apply. Players may hold more than one non-FIFA nationality.

No.	Pos.	Nation	Player
—	DF	SVK	Patrik Šurnovský (to FC Petržalka)

=== MŠK Žilina B ===
In: Note: Flags indicate national team as defined under FIFA eligibility rules; some limited exceptions apply. Players may hold more than one non-FIFA nationality.

No.	Pos.	Nation	Player

Out: Note: Flags indicate national team as defined under FIFA eligibility rules; some limited exceptions apply. Players may hold more than one non-FIFA nationality.

No.	Pos.	Nation	Player

=== FK Pohronie ===
In: Note: Flags indicate national team as defined under FIFA eligibility rules; some limited exceptions apply. Players may hold more than one non-FIFA nationality.

No.	Pos.	Nation	Player
—	DF	SVK	Richard Hečko (on loan from FK Železiarne Podbrezová)
—	DF	SVK	Dávid Ovšonka (on loan from FK Železiarne Podbrezová)
—	DF	SVK	Alex Molčan (on loan from FK Železiarne Podbrezová)
—	MF	GHA	Derrick Bonsu (on loan from FK Železiarne Podbrezová)
—	DF	SVK	Nicolas Šikula (from FK Železiarne Podbrezová)
—	FW	SVK	Adam Horvát (from FK Železiarne Podbrezová)

Out: Note: Flags indicate national team as defined under FIFA eligibility rules; some limited exceptions apply. Players may hold more than one non-FIFA nationality.

No.	Pos.	Nation	Player
—	MF	NGA	Ridwan Sanusi (to FK Železiarne Podbrezová)
—	DF	SVK	Vladimír Majdan (loan return to FC Košice)
—	FW	UKR	Dmytro Laktionov (to FK Železiarne Podbrezová)

=== ŠK Slovan Bratislava B ===
In: Note: Flags indicate national team as defined under FIFA eligibility rules; some limited exceptions apply. Players may hold more than one non-FIFA nationality.

No.	Pos.	Nation	Player
—	GK	SVK	René Žákech (from FK Rača)
—	DF	SVK	Erik Kramár (from FK Dubnica)
—	MF	NGA	Elvis Isaac (from FK Dubnica)
—	MF	SVK	Branislav Spáčil (from FC Petržalka)

Out: Note: Flags indicate national team as defined under FIFA eligibility rules; some limited exceptions apply. Players may hold more than one non-FIFA nationality.

No.	Pos.	Nation	Player

=== Spartak Myjava ===
In: Note: Flags indicate national team as defined under FIFA eligibility rules; some limited exceptions apply. Players may hold more than one non-FIFA nationality.

No.	Pos.	Nation	Player
—	DF	SVK	Imrich Bedecs (from MFK Tatran Liptovský Mikuláš)

Out: Note: Flags indicate national team as defined under FIFA eligibility rules; some limited exceptions apply. Players may hold more than one non-FIFA nationality.

No.	Pos.	Nation	Player
—	FW	SVK	Stanislav Olejník (loan return to FC Spartak Trnava)

=== FC ŠTK 1914 Šamorín ===
In: Note: Flags indicate national team as defined under FIFA eligibility rules; some limited exceptions apply. Players may hold more than one non-FIFA nationality.

No.	Pos.	Nation	Player

Out: Note: Flags indicate national team as defined under FIFA eligibility rules; some limited exceptions apply. Players may hold more than one non-FIFA nationality.

No.	Pos.	Nation	Player
—	DF	GUI	Franck Bahi (on loan to MFK Zemplín Michalovce)
—	GK	HUN	Erik Gyurákovics (on loan to FC DAC 1904 Dunajská Streda)
—	DF	SVK	Adrián Lehotský (to MFK Tatran Liptovský Mikuláš)

=== MŠK Považská Bystrica ===
In: Note: Flags indicate national team as defined under FIFA eligibility rules; some limited exceptions apply. Players may hold more than one non-FIFA nationality.

No.	Pos.	Nation	Player
—	GK	SVK	Matej Slávik (loan return from MŠK Žilina)

Out: Note: Flags indicate national team as defined under FIFA eligibility rules; some limited exceptions apply. Players may hold more than one non-FIFA nationality.

No.	Pos.	Nation	Player
—	GK	SVK	Matej Slávik (on loan to FC ViOn Zlaté Moravce)

=== MŠK Púchov ===
In: Note: Flags indicate national team as defined under FIFA eligibility rules; some limited exceptions apply. Players may hold more than one non-FIFA nationality.

No.	Pos.	Nation	Player
—	DF	SVK	Martin Klabník (from FK Pohronie)

Out: Note: Flags indicate national team as defined under FIFA eligibility rules; some limited exceptions apply. Players may hold more than one non-FIFA nationality.

No.	Pos.	Nation	Player
—	DF	SVK	Matej Moško (to FC ViOn Zlaté Moravce)

=== FK Slavoj Trebišov ===
In: Note: Flags indicate national team as defined under FIFA eligibility rules; some limited exceptions apply. Players may hold more than one non-FIFA nationality.

No.	Pos.	Nation	Player
—	MF	MOZ	Pablo Bechardas (from (Portugal) C.S. Marítimo U23)

Out: Note: Flags indicate national team as defined under FIFA eligibility rules; some limited exceptions apply. Players may hold more than one non-FIFA nationality.

No.	Pos.	Nation	Player
—	GK	SVK	Filip Dlubáč (loan return to FK Železiarne Podbrezová)
—	MF	SVK	Stanislav Danko (to MFK Zemplín Michalovce)

=== FC Petržalka ===
In: Note: Flags indicate national team as defined under FIFA eligibility rules; some limited exceptions apply. Players may hold more than one non-FIFA nationality.

No.	Pos.	Nation	Player
—	DF	SVK	Patrik Šurnovský (from KFC Komárno)
—	FW	SRB	Matija Babović (from FK Dubnica)
—	FW	SVK	Patrik Čiernik (from FC Slovan Galanta)
—	GK	CZE	Pavel Halouska (from (Czech Republic) FK Mladá Boleslav)
—	MF	GHA	Cletus Nombil (from Free Agent)
—	DF	SVK	Richard Hečko (on loan from FK Železiarne Podbrezová)
—	MF	SVK	Maximilián Halo (from FC Petržalka U19)
—	DF	SVK	Matúš Minka (from FC Petržalka U19)
—	GK	SVK	Marián Fendek (from FC Petržalka U19)

Out: Note: Flags indicate national team as defined under FIFA eligibility rules; some limited exceptions apply. Players may hold more than one non-FIFA nationality.

No.	Pos.	Nation	Player
—	FW	BIH	Haris Harba (Released)
—	MF	SVK	Juraj Piroska (Released)
—	MF	SVK	Branislav Spáčil (Released)
—	MF	SVK	Filip Bobrovský (Released)
—	DF	SVK	Timotej Petrišák (Released)
—	DF	SVK	Matúš Kuník (Released)
—	MF	SVK	Peter Chríbik (Released)
—	DF	SVK	Simeon Kohút (Released)
—	DF	SVK	Timotej Petrišák (Released)
—	DF	SVK	Timotej Tóth (Released)
—	MF	SVK	Tomáš Brigant (Released)
—	GK	SVK	Filip Krížik (Released)

=== MFK Dolný Kubín ===
In: Note: Flags indicate national team as defined under FIFA eligibility rules; some limited exceptions apply. Players may hold more than one non-FIFA nationality.

No.	Pos.	Nation	Player
—	DF	SEN	Tidiane Djiby Ba (from (Bahrain) Sitra Club)

Out: Note: Flags indicate national team as defined under FIFA eligibility rules; some limited exceptions apply. Players may hold more than one non-FIFA nationality.

No.	Pos.	Nation	Player

=== FK Humenné ===
In: Note: Flags indicate national team as defined under FIFA eligibility rules; some limited exceptions apply. Players may hold more than one non-FIFA nationality.

No.	Pos.	Nation	Player
—	DF	SVK	Lukáš Horváth (from FC Tatran Prešov)

Out: Note: Flags indicate national team as defined under FIFA eligibility rules; some limited exceptions apply. Players may hold more than one non-FIFA nationality.

No.	Pos.	Nation	Player

=== OFK Malženice ===
In: Note: Flags indicate national team as defined under FIFA eligibility rules; some limited exceptions apply. Players may hold more than one non-FIFA nationality.

No.	Pos.	Nation	Player

Out: Note: Flags indicate national team as defined under FIFA eligibility rules; some limited exceptions apply. Players may hold more than one non-FIFA nationality.

No.	Pos.	Nation	Player

=== FK Spišská Nová Ves ===
In: Note: Flags indicate national team as defined under FIFA eligibility rules; some limited exceptions apply. Players may hold more than one non-FIFA nationality.

No.	Pos.	Nation	Player
—	FW	SVK	Jakub Škovran (from FC Košice)
—	MF	SVK	Martin Pribula (from FC Tatran Prešov)

Out: Note: Flags indicate national team as defined under FIFA eligibility rules; some limited exceptions apply. Players may hold more than one non-FIFA nationality.

No.	Pos.	Nation	Player
