= 2022–23 MFK Tatran Liptovský Mikuláš season =

Slovak football club season

Tatran Liptovský Mikuláš
2022–23 season
- President: Milan Mikušiak
- Manager: Marek Petruš (until 27 May 2022); Jozef Kostelník (from 27 May 2022 to 14 November 2022); Marek Fabuľa (from 21 November 2022 to 27 February 2023); Ondrej Desiatnik (from 10 March 2023)
- Stadium: Stadium Liptovský Mikuláš (Home stadium); NTC Poprad (Note: Tatran Liptovský Mikuláš played their home matches in Slovak First Football League at NTC Poprad in Poprad, 60 km away from their home city, instead of their regular stadium, Stadium Liptovský Mikuláš in Liptovský Mikuláš.) (Temporary stadium)
- Slovak First Football League: 12th (relegated)
- Slovak Cup: Quarter-finals
- Top goalscorer: League: Erik Jendrišek (5); All: Rastislav Václavik (6)
- Highest home attendance: 1,956 v Slovan Bratislava (14 August 2022, Slovak First Football League)
- Lowest home attendance: 141 v Skalica (11 March 2023, Slovak First Football League)
- Average home league attendance: 529
- Biggest win: 11–0 v Bacúch (Away, 14 September 2022, Slovak Cup)
- Biggest defeat: 1–5 v Slovan Bratislava (Home, 14 August 2022, Slovak First Football League); 0–4 v Skalica (Away, 13 May 2023, Slovak First Football League)
Home colours	Away colours

The 2022–23 season was Mestský Futbalový klub Tatran Liptovský Mikuláš's 2nd consecutive season in Slovak First Football League. In addition to the domestic league, Tatran Liptovský Mikuláš participated in Slovak Cup.

== Squad ==
Squad at end of season

Note: Flags indicate national team as defined under FIFA eligibility rules; some limited exceptions apply. Players may hold more than one non-FIFA nationality.

No.	Pos.	Nation	Player
1	GK	SVK	Dávid Húska
2	DF	SVK	Richard Župa
3	DF	SVK	Gergely Tumma (on loan from Spartak Trnava)
6	MF	SRB	Strahinja Pavišić
7	FW	NGR	David Fadairo (on loan from Rimavská Sobota)
8	MF	SVK	Tomáš Gerát (vice-captain)
9	MF	SVK	Rastislav Václavik
10	MF	SVK	Richard Bartoš (captain)
11	MF	SVK	Tomáš Staš
14	FW	SVK	Tobiáš Diviš
17	FW	SVK	Peter Voško
19	MF	SVK	Ľuboslav Laura

No.	Pos.	Nation	Player
21	MF	SVK	Christián Steinhübel
23	MF	SVK	Adam Gaži (on loan from Trenčín)
24	DF	UKR	Ivan Spychka
25	DF	CZE	Martin Nečas
26	DF	SVK	Imrich Bedecs
28	DF	SVK	Dávid Filinský
29	GK	CZE	Dominik Sváček
33	DF	SRB	Mihajilo Popović
62	FW	SVK	Erik Jendrišek
66	FW	SVK	René Dedič (on loan from Třinec)
91	GK	SVK	Martin Polaček

== Transfers ==
=== Summer ===
In: Note: Flags indicate national team as defined under FIFA eligibility rules; some limited exceptions apply. Players may hold more than one non-FIFA nationality.

No.	Pos.	Nation	Player
—	DF	SVK	Richard Župa (from Partizán Bardejov)
—	MF	SVK	Peter Ďungel (from MFK Ružomberok)
—	DF	SVK	Imrich Bedecs (from (Czech Republic) FK Fotbal Třinec)
—	DF	SRB	Mihajilo Popović (from ŠKF Sereď)
—	MF	SVK	Marko Totka (from FK Senica)
—	DF	SVK	Mário Mihál (from FK Senica)
—	GK	CZE	Denis Gröger (from MFK Skalica)
—	DF	CZE	Martin Nečas (from (Czech Republic) FC Fastav Zlín)
—	FW	SVK	Erik Jendrišek (from AS Trenčín)

Out: Note: Flags indicate national team as defined under FIFA eligibility rules; some limited exceptions apply. Players may hold more than one non-FIFA nationality.

No.	Pos.	Nation	Player
—	DF	SVK	František Pavúk (loan return to FC Košice)
—	GK	CZE	Matěj Luksch (loan return to (Czech Republic) SK Dynamo České Budějovice)
—	MF	SVK	Patrik Pinte (to FC ViOn Zlaté Moravce)
—	DF	CZE	Martin Šindelář (loan return to (Czech Republic) MFK Karviná)
—	DF	SVK	Richard Nagy (loan return to MŠK Žilina)
—	DF	SVK	Kristián Flak (loan return to (Czech Republic) Sparta Prague B)
—	MF	SVK	Jakub Švec (loan return to FC DAC 1904 Dunajská Streda)
—	DF	SVK	Adam Krčík (to (Czech Republic) MFK Karviná)
—	FW	SRB	Dragan Andrić (to 1. FC Tatran Prešov)
—	DF	SVK	Dávid Krčík (to (Czech Republic) MFK Karviná)

=== Winter ===
In: Note: Flags indicate national team as defined under FIFA eligibility rules; some limited exceptions apply. Players may hold more than one non-FIFA nationality.

No.	Pos.	Nation	Player
—	DF	SVK	Gergely Tumma (on loan from FC Spartak Trnava)
—	MF	NGR	David Fadairo (on loan from MŠK Rimavská Sobota)
―	MF	SRB	Strahinja Pavišić (from (Georgia (country)) FC Telavi)
―	FW	SVK	René Dedič (on loan from (Czech Republic) FK Třinec)
―	MF	SVK	Christián Steinhübel (from FK Pohronie)
―	DF	UKR	Ivan Spychka (from (Poland) Concordia Elbląg)
―	GK	SVK	Martin Polaček (from (Czech Republic) FK Mladá Boleslav)

Out: Note: Flags indicate national team as defined under FIFA eligibility rules; some limited exceptions apply. Players may hold more than one non-FIFA nationality.

No.	Pos.	Nation	Player
—	MF	SVK	Adrián Káčerík (to FK Dukla Banská Bystrica)
—	MF	SVK	Ivan Kotora (Released)
—	FW	SVK	Adam Matoš (Released)
—	DF	SVK	Lukáš Bielák (Released)
—	MF	SVK	Peter Ďungel (on loan to MŠK Považská Bystrica)
—	DF	SVK	Mário Mihál (loan return to FC Spartak Trnava)
—	MF	SVK	Marko Totka (to TBA)
—	GK	CZE	Denis Gröger (to TBA)

== Competitions ==
=== Overview ===
Competition	First match	Last match	Starting round	Final position	Record							
Competition	First match	Last match	Starting round	Final position	Pld	W	D	L	GF	GA	GD	Win %
Slovak First Football League	17 July 2022	20 May 2023	Matchday 1	12th	32	3	9	20	24	59	−35	9.38
Slovak Cup	24 August 2022	8 March 2023	Second round	Quarter-finals	5	4	1	0	19	2	+17	80.00
Total					37	7	10	20	43	61	−18	18.92

Source: Competitions

=== Slovak First Football League ===
==== Regular season ====
===== League table =====
Pos	Team	Pld	W	D	L	GF	GA	GD	Pts	Qualification
7	Ružomberok	22	7	9	6	24	22	+2	30	Qualification for the relegation group
8	Zemplín Michalovce	22	6	5	11	22	34	−12	23	Qualification for the relegation group
9	Zlaté Moravce	22	4	11	7	28	35	−7	23	Qualification for the relegation group
10	Trenčín	22	5	7	10	20	33	−13	22	Qualification for the relegation group
11	Skalica	22	4	7	11	19	31	−12	19	Qualification for the relegation group
12	Tatran Liptovský Mikuláš	22	1	6	15	17	40	−23	9	Qualification for the relegation group

Source: Niké liga (in Slovak)
Rules for classification: 1) Points; 2) Head-to-head points; 3) Head-to-head goal difference; 4) Head-to-head away goals scored; 5) Play-off.

===== Results summary =====
Overall								Home						Away					
Pld	W	D	L	GF	GA	GD	Pts	W	D	L	GF	GA	GD	W	D	L	GF	GA	GD
22	1	6	15	17	40	−23	9	0	4	7	9	21	−12	1	2	8	8	19	−11

Source: Worldfootball

===== Results by round =====
Round	1	2	3	4	5	6	7	8	9	10	11	12	13	14	15	16	17	18	19	20	21	22
Ground	A	H	H	A	H	A	H	A	H	H	A	H	A	A	H	A	H	A	H	A	A	H
Result	L	D	D	D	L	L	L	L	D	L	L	L	W	D	L	L	D	L	L	L	L	L
Position	9	9	10	10	10	10	11	12	12	12	12	12	12	12	12	12	12	12	12	12	12	12
Points	0	1	2	3	3	3	3	3	4	4	4	4	7	8	8	8	9	9	9	9	9	9

Source: Worldfootball
A = Away; H = Home; W = Win; D = Draw; L = Loss

===== Matches =====
17 July 2022 1	DAC Dunajská Streda	2–1	Tatran Liptovský Mikuláš	Dunajská Streda
18:00 CEST (UTC+2)	Njie (yellow card) 37'; Krstović 72'; Kružliak 78'	Report	Gerát (yellow card) 42'; Káčerík 57'; Popović (yellow card) 90'	Stadium: MOL Aréna; Attendance: 4,630; Referee: Peter Kráľovič; Assistant referees: Adam Jekkel, Simeon Vass

23 July 2022 2	Tatran Liptovský Mikuláš	1–1	Zemplín Michalovce	Poprad
18:00 CEST (UTC+2)	Václavik 33' (pen.); Popović (yellow card) 86'; Gerát (yellow card) 88'	Report	Méndez (yellow card) 32'; Ranko 37'; Marcin (yellow card) 86'	Stadium: NTC Poprad; Attendance: 556; Referee: Bálint Kišš; Assistant referees: Matej Zemko, Pavel Jánošík

31 July 2022 3	Tatran Liptovský Mikuláš	0–0	Ružomberok	Poprad
20:30 CEST (UTC+2)	Káčerík (yellow card) 22'; Bielák (yellow card) 30'; Václavik (yellow card) 47'; Staš (yellow card) 90'	Report	Fabiš (yellow card) 2'; Mojžiš (yellow card) 32'; Regáli (yellow card) 45'	Stadium: NTC Poprad; Attendance: 896; Referee: Peter Ziemba; Assistant referees: Adam Jekkel, Milan Štrbo

6 August 2022 4	Zlaté Moravce	1–1	Tatran Liptovský Mikuláš	Zlaté Moravce
18:00 CEST (UTC+2)	Pintér (yellow card) 5'; Suľa 14', (yellow card) 85'; Mondek (yellow card) 28'; Grozdanovski (yellow card) 42'; Vestenický (yellow card) 42'	Report	Jendrišek (yellow card) 5'; Bedecs 19'; Václavik (yellow card) 28'; Sváček (yellow card) 58'; Nečas (yellow card) 69'	Stadium: Štadión FC ViOn; Attendance: 972; Referee: Michal Smolák; Assistant referees: Pavel Jánošík, Juraj Halíček

14 August 2022 5	Tatran Liptovský Mikuláš	1–5	Slovan Bratislava	Poprad
18:00 CEST (UTC+2)	Popović 29', (yellow card) 43'	Report	Čavrić 13'; Šaponjić 53'; Hrnčár 56', 71'; Kucka 83'	Stadium: NTC Poprad; Attendance: 1,956; Referee: Peter Kráľovič; Assistant referees: Patrik Kmec, Jakub Košecký

20 August 2022 6	Trenčín	2–1	Tatran Liptovský Mikuláš	Trenčín
18:00 CEST (UTC+2)	Gajdoš 18'; Kupusović (yellow card) 45'; Stojsavljević (yellow card) 68', (goal) 78'; Ibrahim (yellow card) 90'	Report	Gerát (yellow card) 29'; Bedecs 52'	Stadium: Štadión Sihoť; Attendance: 716; Referee: Pavel Ochotnický; Assistant referees: Milan Štrbo, Matej Zemko

27 August 2022 7	Tatran Liptovský Mikuláš	2–5	Podbrezová	Poprad
18:00 CEST (UTC+2)	Laura (yellow card) 28'; Káčerík 50'; Popović 53'; Totka (yellow card) 60'	Report	Godál 7'; Cobnan 23', 73', (yellow card) 44'; Kukoľ (yellow card) 56'; Grendel (yellow card) 58'; Župa 61' (o.g.); Bariš 90'	Stadium: NTC Poprad; Attendance: 684; Referee: Ivan Kružliak; Assistant referees: Milan Štrbo, Jakub Košecký

31 August 2022 8	Spartak Trnava	1–0	Tatran Liptovský Mikuláš	Trnava
18:00 CEST (UTC+2)	Štetina (yellow card) 19'; Savvidis (yellow card) 73', (goal) 82'	Report		Stadium: Štadión Antona Malatinského; Attendance: 2,126; Referee: Erik Gemzický; Assistant referees: Patrik Kmec, Matej Zemko

3 September 2022 9	Tatran Liptovský Mikuláš	0–0	Skalica	Poprad
18:00 CEST (UTC+2)		Report	Blažek (yellow card) 74'; Nagy (yellow card) 84'	Stadium: NTC Poprad; Attendance: 421; Referee: Peter Kráľovič; Assistant referees: Tomáš Vorel, Patrik Kmec

10 September 2022 10	Tatran Liptovský Mikuláš	1–2	Dukla Banská Bystrica	Poprad
18:00 CEST (UTC+2)	Bielák (yellow card) 9'; Staš 14'; Bedecs (yellow card) 48'	Report	Polievka 56', 89', (yellow card) 82'	Stadium: NTC Poprad; Attendance: 531; Referee: Erik Gemzický; Assistant referees: Pavel Jánošík, Juraj Halíček

17 September 2022 11	Žilina	4–2	Tatran Liptovský Mikuláš	Žilina
16:00 CEST (UTC+2)	Gidi 7'; Kaprálik 22', (yellow card) 45'; Jambor 38'; Kopas (yellow card) 49'; Leitner (yellow card) 54'; Ďuriš 57'; Myslovič (yellow card) 76'	Report	Jendrišek 37', (yellow card) 45'; Totka (yellow card) 53'; Václavik (yellow card) 59', (goal) 88'	Stadium: Štadión pod Dubňom; Attendance: 1,112; Referee: Marián Ruc; Assistant referees: Juraj Halíček, Matej Zemko

1 October 2022 12	Tatran Liptovský Mikuláš	0–1	DAC Dunajská Streda	Poprad
18:00 CEST (UTC+2)	Bedecs (yellow card) 32' (yellow-red card) 41'; Nečas (yellow card) 81'; Sváček (yellow card) 90'; Totka (yellow card) 90'	Report	Bielák 20' (o.g.); Kalmár (yellow card) 68'; Risvanis (yellow card) 81'	Stadium: NTC Poprad; Attendance: 511; Referee: Martin Dohál; Assistant referees: Tomáš Straka, Peter Čajka

8 October 2022 13	Zemplín Michalovce	1–2	Tatran Liptovský Mikuláš	Michalovce
18:00 CEST (UTC+2)	Peña 20'; Njie (yellow card) 46'	Report	Mihál (yellow card) 49'; Jendrišek 59'; Gaži 67'; Káčerík (yellow card) 90'	Stadium: Mestský futbalový štadión Attendance: 724; Referee: Michal Očenáš; Assistant referees: Dušan Štofik, Mário Roszbeck

15 October 2022 14	Ružomberok	1–1	Tatran Liptovský Mikuláš	Ružomberok
18:00 CEST (UTC+2)	Regáli 48'	Report	Mihál (yellow card) 4'; Václavik 30'; Gerát (yellow card) 39'; Župa (yellow card) 61'; Gaži (yellow card) 71'	Stadium: Štadión pod Čebraťom; Attendance: 1,492; Referee: Erik Gemzický; Assistant referees: Simeon Vass, Peter Čajka

22 October 2022 15	Tatran Liptovský Mikuláš	1–2	Zlaté Moravce	Poprad
15:00 CEST (UTC+2)	Gaži (yellow card) 34'; Popović 90'	Report	Suľa (yellow card) 9'; Almeida (yellow card) 23'; Čonka (yellow card) 62'; Filinský 67' (o.g.); Brenkus 77'; Vestenický (yellow card) 86'	Stadium: NTC Poprad; Attendance: 310; Referee: Michal Očenáš; Assistant referees: Tomáš Straka, František Ferenc

30 October 2022 16	Slovan Bratislava	1–0	Tatran Liptovský Mikuláš	Bratislava
15:00 CET (UTC+1)	Ramírez 48'; Agbo (yellow card) 68'	Report	Nečas (yellow card) 28'; Popović (yellow card) 39'; Župa (yellow card) 72'	Stadium: Tehelné pole Attendance: 2,689; Referee: Bálint Kišš; Assistant referees: Pavel Jánošík, Peter Čajka

5 November 2022 17	Tatran Liptovský Mikuláš	1–1	Trenčín	Poprad
15:00 CET (UTC+1)	Jendrišek 68'	Report	Lavrinčík (yellow card) 43'; Sulaeman 83'; Pires (yellow card) 88'; Gajdoš (yellow card) 89'; Letenay (yellow card) 90'	Stadium: NTC Poprad; Attendance: 421; Referee: Peter Kráľovič; Assistant referees: Mário Roszbeck, Tobiáš Pacák

12 November 2022 18	Podbrezová	1–0	Tatran Liptovský Mikuláš	Podbrezová
15:00 CET (UTC+1)	Cobnan 8'; Kukoľ (yellow card) 85'; Bariš (yellow card) 90'	Report	Filinský (yellow card) 38'; Gerát (yellow card) 61'; Jendrišek (yellow card) 66'; Staš (yellow card) 77'; Totka (yellow card) 81' (yellow-red card) 88'	Stadium: ZELPO Aréna; Attendance: 1,470; Referee: Michal Očenáš; Assistant referees: Tomáš Vorel, Tobiáš Pacák

11 February 2023 19	Tatran Liptovský Mikuláš	1–2	Spartak Trnava	Poprad
15:00 CET (UTC+1)	Jendrišek 24'; Župa (yellow card) 86'	Report	Taiwo 11'; Ofori (yellow card) 61'; Koštrna 88' (pen.); Štetina (yellow card) 90'; Takáč (yellow card) 90'	Stadium: NTC Poprad; Attendance: 696; Referee: Marián Ruc; Assistant referees: Ján Pozor, Andrej Hrmo

19 February 2023 20	Skalica	3–0	Tatran Liptovský Mikuláš	Trenčín
15:00 CET (UTC+1)	Fábry 36'; Medved 69' (pen.); Vlasko 79' (pen.)	Report	Tumma (yellow card) 35'	Stadium: Štadión Sihoť; Attendance: 169; Referee: Lukáš Dzivjak; Assistant referees: Mário Roszbeck, Simeon Vass

25 February 2023 21	Dukla Banská Bystrica	2–0	Tatran Liptovský Mikuláš	Banská Bystrica
15:00 CET (UTC+1)	Rymarenko 20'; Balić 51'	Report	Pavišić (yellow card) 30'; Popović (yellow card) 50'	Stadium: Národný Atletický Štadión; Attendance: 937; Referee: Peter Kráľovič; Assistant referees: Branislav Hancko, Peter Bednár

4 March 2023 22	Tatran Liptovský Mikuláš	1–2	Žilina	Poprad
16:30 CET (UTC+1)	Tumma (yellow card) 3' (yellow-red card) 29'; Dedič 19'; Diviš (yellow card) 61'; Župa (yellow card) 89'	Report	Jambor 22'; Kaprálik (yellow card) 24', (goal) 86'	Stadium: NTC Poprad; Attendance: 393; Referee: Martin Dohál; Assistant referees: Juraj Halíček, Dušan Štofik

==== Relegation group ====
===== League table =====
Pos	Team	Pld	W	D	L	GF	GA	GD	Pts	Qualification or relegation	RUŽ	SKA	TRE	ZMI	ZLM	TLM
1	Ružomberok	32	12	11	9	43	31	+12	47	Qualification for the Europa Conference League play-offs	—	1–2	4–1	2–0	2–0	3–0
2	Skalica	32	10	10	12	38	38	0	40		1–1	—	2–0	3–2	0–1	4–0
3	Trenčín	32	9	9	14	35	52	−17	36		0–3	1–3	—	3–3	2–1	2–2
4	Zemplín Michalovce	32	9	9	14	39	50	−11	36		2–2	1–1	0–2	—	1–0	0–0
5	Zlaté Moravce (O)	32	6	13	13	35	49	−14	31	Qualification for the relegation play-offs	1–0	0–0	1–2	2–5	—	0–1
6	Tatran Liptovský Mikuláš (R)	32	3	9	20	24	59	−35	18	Relegation to the 2. Liga	2–1	0–3	0–2	1–3	1–1	—

Source: Niké liga (in Slovak)
Legend: Blue = home team win; Yellow = draw; Red = away team win.
Rules for classification: 1) Points; 2) Head-to-head points; 3) Head-to-head goal difference; 4) Head-to-head away goals scored; 5) Play-off.
(O) Play-off winners; (R) Relegated

===== Results summary =====
Overall								Home						Away					
Pld	W	D	L	GF	GA	GD	Pts	W	D	L	GF	GA	GD	W	D	L	GF	GA	GD
10	2	3	5	7	19	−12	9	1	1	3	4	10	−6	1	2	2	3	9	−6

Source: Worldfootball

===== Results by round =====
Round	23	24	25	26	27	28	29	30	31	32
Ground	H	A	H	A	A	H	A	H	A	H
Result	L	D	L	W	L	L	D	D	L	W
Position	12	12	12	12	12	12	12	12	12	12
Points	9	10	10	13	13	13	14	15	15	18

Source: Worldfootball
A = Away; H = Home; W = Win; D = Draw; L = Loss

===== Matches =====
11 March 2023 23	Tatran Liptovský Mikuláš	0–3	Skalica	Poprad
15:00 CET (UTC+1)	Bedecs (yellow card) 82'	Report	Yao 5'; Morong (yellow card) 25'; Hollý 39', (yellow card) 48'; Haša 62'	Stadium: NTC Poprad; Attendance: 141; Referee: Michal Smolák; Assistant referees: Erik Weiss, Tomáš Straka

18 March 2023 24	Zemplín Michalovce	0–0	Tatran Liptovský Mikuláš	Michalovce
15:00 CET (UTC+1)	Peña (yellow card) 41'; Njie (yellow card) 72'	Report	Tumma (yellow card) 36'; Polaček (yellow card) 62'	Stadium: Mestský futbalový štadión Attendance: 557; Referee: Erik Gemzický; Assistant referees: Pavel Jánošík, Tobiáš Pacák

1 April 2023 25	Tatran Liptovský Mikuláš	0–2	Trenčín	Poprad
18:00 CEST (UTC+2)	Václavik (yellow card) 10'	Report	Soares (yellow card) 14'; Yem (yellow card) 44'; Bainović 47', 64'; Hollý (yellow card) 90'	Stadium: NTC Poprad; Attendance: 221; Referee: Boris Marhefka; Assistant referees: Milan Štrbo, Peter Čajka

8 April 2023 26	Zlaté Moravce	0–1	Tatran Liptovský Mikuláš	Zlaté Moravce
15:00 CEST (UTC+2)	Duga (yellow card) 69'	Report	Steinhübel 37'; Diviš (red card) 71'	Stadium: Štadión FC ViOn; Attendance: 346; Referee: Kristián Micheľ; Assistant referees: František Ferenc, Simeon Vass

15 April 2023 27	Ružomberok	3–0	Tatran Liptovský Mikuláš	Ružomberok
18:00 CEST (UTC+2)	Madleňák (yellow card) 7'; Boďa 35', 55'; Šefčík 60'; Mojžiš (yellow card) 64'	Report	Gerát (yellow card) 4'	Stadium: Štadión pod Čebraťom; Attendance: 927; Referee: Bálint Kišš; Assistant referees: Tobiáš Pacák, Peter Čajka

22 April 2023 28	Tatran Liptovský Mikuláš	1–3	Zemplín Michalovce	Poprad
18:00 CEST (UTC+2)	Steinhübel 40'; Pavišić (yellow card) 53'	Report	Jánošík 2'; Magda 10'; Marcin 34'	Stadium: NTC Poprad; Attendance: 191; Referee: Erik Gemzický; Assistant referees: Erik Weiss, Pavel Jánošík

28 April 2023 29	Trenčín	2–2	Tatran Liptovský Mikuláš	Trenčín
18:00 CEST (UTC+2)	Gajdoš 49', 89' (pen.), (yellow card) 58'; Pires (yellow card) 75'; Hollý (yellow card) 90'	Report	Gerát 23', (yellow card) 23'; Spychka 45'; Laura (yellow card) 75'; Polaček (yellow card) 77'	Stadium: Štadión Sihoť; Attendance: 905; Referee: Filip Glova; Assistant referees: Dušan Štofik, Tobiáš Pacák

6 May 2023 30	Tatran Liptovský Mikuláš	1–1	Zlaté Moravce	Poprad
18:00 CEST (UTC+2)	Václavik (yellow card) 19', (goal) 45'; Nečas (yellow card) 52'; Popović (yellow card) 61'	Report	Almeida 15'; Sloboda (yellow card) 20'; Bednár (yellow card) 24'; Pinte (yellow card) 36'; Suľa (yellow card) 41'	Stadium: NTC Poprad; Attendance: 211; Referee: Michal Očenáš; Assistant referees: Simeon Vass, Rastislav Kuba

13 May 2023 31	Skalica	4–0	Tatran Liptovský Mikuláš	Skalica
16:30 CEST (UTC+2)	Morong 40', 57', (yellow card) 45'; Fábry 66'; Švec 80'	Report	Gerát (yellow card) 30'; Popović (yellow card) 52'; Diviš (yellow card) 79'	Stadium: Mestský štadión Skalica; Attendance: 814; Referee: Peter Ziemba; Assistant referees: Adam Jekkel, Matej Zemko

20 May 2023 32	Tatran Liptovský Mikuláš	2–1	Ružomberok	Poprad
18:00 CEST (UTC+2)	Laura 31'; Spychka (yellow card) 57'; Jendrišek 62' (pen.)	Report	Tučný (yellow card) 21'; Bobček 40'	Stadium: NTC Poprad; Attendance: 328; Referee: Igor Valent; Assistant referees: Mário Roszbeck, Martin Špivák

=== Slovak Cup ===
24 August 2022 Second round	Čadca	0–2	Tatran Liptovský Mikuláš	Čadca
17:00 CEST (UTC+2)	Ceniga (yellow card) 17'	Report	Ďungel 41', 64'	Stadium: Stadium FK Čadca; Attendance: 450; Referee: Marián Ruc; Assistant referees: Tomáš Vorel, Mário Roszbeck

14 September 2022 Third round	Bacúch	0–11	Tatran Liptovský Mikuláš	Bacúch
16:00 CEST (UTC+2)		Report	Káčerík 13', 29', 41'; Bedecs 27'; Václavik 30', 81'; Gaži 37', 76'; Filinský 53'; Ďungel 72', 77'	Stadium: Futbalový štadión FK 09 Bacúch; Attendance: 200; Referee: Boris Marhefka; Assistant referees: Peter Čajka, Tomáš Tůma

18 October 2022 Fourth round	Pohronie	0–1	Tatran Liptovský Mikuláš	Žiar nad Hronom
14:30 CEST (UTC+2)	Laktionov (yellow card) 67'; Oliveira (yellow card) 69'; Holub (yellow card) 74'	Report	Pushkarov (yellow card) 40'; Káčerík (yellow card) 69'	Stadium: Mestský štadión Attendance: 187; Referee: Peter Ziemba; Assistant referees: Peter Bednár, Peter Mihalík

9 November 2022 Round of 16	Jednota Bánová	0–3	Tatran Liptovský Mikuláš	Žilina
13:00 CET (UTC+1)		Report	Voško 51'; Nečas 78', 84'	Stadium: Štadión TJ Jednota Bánová; Attendance: 400; Referee: Kristián Micheľ; Assistant referees: Daniel Poláček, Tobiáš Pacák; Fourth official: Marek Mastiš

8 March 2023 Quarter-finals	Tatran Liptovský Mikuláš	2–2 (3–4 p)	Skalica	Liptovský Mikuláš
14:30 CET (UTC+1)	Bartoš 14', (yellow card) 85'; Mášik 21' (o.g.); Bedecs (yellow card) 64'; Gerát (yellow card) 73'; Sváček (yellow card) 85'	Report	Mášik 44'; Černek (yellow card) 63'; Podhorin 86'; Haša (yellow card) 90'	Stadium: Stadium Liptovský Mikuláš; Attendance: 416; Referee: Peter Ziemba; Assistant referees: Peter Bednár, František Ferenc; Fourth official: Michal Očenáš
Note: Skalica won 4–3 on penalties.
