= 2022–23 Slovak Cup =

Slovnaft Cup

Tournament details
- Country: Slovakia

Final positions
- Champions: Spartak Trnava
- Runners-up: Slovan Bratislava

The 2022–23 Slovak Cup was the 54th edition of the competition.

Spartak Trnava were the defending champions, defeating their rivals Slovan Bratislava in the 2022 final.

Spartak Trnava won a second consecutive title, defeating again Slovan in the final.

Spartak Trnava earned automatic qualification for the UEFA Europa Conference League second qualifying round.

== Format ==
The Slovak Cup is played as a knockout tournament. All matches that end up as a draw after 90 minutes are decided by penalty shoot-outs. All rounds are played as one-off matches except the semi-finals, which are played over two legs.

== Preliminary round ==
Team 1	Score	Team 2
23 July 2022
Busov Gaboltov	w/o	OCFK Marhaň
24 July 2022
Slovan Červeník	3–8	ŠK Blava 1928
Spartak Horná Streda	2–1	PFK Piešťany
MTJ Pravenec	5–2	Junior Kanianka
Slovan Nitra-Chrenová	2–5	ŠK Veľké Zálužie
OFK Mokrý Háj	1–1 (4–1 p)	Iskra Holíč
1. SC Černík	0–1	FC Komjatice
27 July 2022
Družstevník Blatnica	0–1	TJ Družstevník Bitarová
Oravan Rabča	0–1	Sokol Liesek
OFC Perín	1–1 (4–5 p)	FK Krásna
Lokomotíva Ruskov	2–1	Maratón Seňa
FK Široké	2–6	Sokol Chminianska
ŠK Harichovce	2–4	OŠK Teplička
30 July 2022
Štart Kokava nad Rimavicou	w/o	Sklotatran Poltár
Prameň Dolná Strehová	1–7	FK Slovenské Ďarmoty
TJ Nenince	2–5	Partizán Osrblie
Iskra Hnúšťa	5–1	Partizán Čierny Balog
31 July 2022
MŠK Tisovec	1–2	FK Brezno
OFK 1950 Priechod	2–2 (2–4 p)	Slovan Tomášovce
OŠK Spišský Štvrtok	1–2	FK Veľká Lomnica
Slovan Častá	2–0	Slovan Vištuk
ŠK Svätý Jur	0–5	PŠC Pezinok
Slovan Modra	1–1 (5–4 p)	SDM Domino
ŠK Igram	2–2 (4–2 p)	MŠK Senec
3 August 2022
Tatran Chlebnice	2–0	Družstevník Dlhá nad Oravou

== First round ==
Team 1	Score	Team 2
24 July 2022
Slovan Magura Vavrečka	1–3	FK Poprad
TJ Jasenov	4–0	II.Rákóczi Ferenc Borša
29 July 2022
Oravan Oravská Jasenica	1–1 (1–4 p)	FK Čadca
Slovan Skalité	1–2	ŠK Čierne
30 July 2022
OŠK Podolie	2–2 (1–3 p)	MFK Vrbové
MTJ Pravenec	0–3	ŠKF Sereď
Slovan Krušovce	2–2 (2–3 p)	OFK Solčany
Lokomotíva Bánov	2–0	Termál Podhájska
Slovan Zemianske Kostoľany	1–0	Baník Lehota pod Vtáčnikom
FK Sitno Banská Štiavnica	0–0 (4–2 p)	MFK Zvolen
FK Selce	1–2	FK Šalková
Danubia Veľký Biel	3–6	ŠK Tomášov
Spartak Radôstka	1–6	Kysucké Nové Mesto
31 July 2022
OŠK Švošov	4–1	Slovenská Ľupča
ŠL Báb	1–3	Slovan Hlohovec
OŠK Trenčianske Stankovce	5–0	FK Tempo Partizánske
Bestrent Horná Krupá	0–1	TJ Slavoj Boleráz
ŠK Nevidzany	2–1	Slovan Čeľadice
FC Topoľčany	0–1	OFK Tovarníky
Chocholná-Velčice	3–0	Spartak Kvašov
Plevník-Drienové	1–4	TJ Partizán Prečín
Družstevník Rybky	1–3	Družstevník Radimov
TJ Kopčany	3–2	Baník Brodské
SK Kmeťovo	0–0 (8–7 p)	TJ Veľké Lovce
TJ Salka	3–1	Slovan Šahy
Družstevník Trstice	3–0	FC Neded
OFK Branč	1–0	ŠK Šoporňa
Kostolné Kračany	0–1	Thermál Veľký Meder
Tatran Uhrovec	2–4	FC Baník Prievidza
ŠK Blava 1928	1–3	FK Beluša
Spartak Horná Streda	0–4	AFC Nové Mesto
MŠO Štúrovo	0–1	Veľké Ludince
ŠK Bešeňov	2–2 (4–2 p)	Slovan Duslo Šaľa
FK Veľký Cetín	0–8	OFK Malženice
ŠK Hrochoť	0–0 (6–7 p)	TJ Sokol Medzibrod
TJ Družstevník Malá Mača	2–2 (4–3 p)	FC Pata
Kráľová pri Senci	0–1	TJ Rovinka
FC Zohor	0–3	MFK Rusovce
CFK Pezinok–Cajla	0–1	Slovan Most
ŠK Šenkvice	2–0	SFC Kalinkovo
OŠK Láb	0–2	FC Malacky
2 August 2022
Lokomotíva DNV	1–1 (4–2 p)	NMŠK 1922 Bratislava
Partizán Domaniža	3–3 (3–5 p)	TJ Jednota Bánová
Karpaty Limbach	0–2	ŠK Bernolákovo
3 August 2022
FK Vápeč Horná Poruba	1–1 (4–3 p)	Slovan Bolešov
10 August 2022
Slovan Častá	0–8	Inter Bratislava
PŠC Pezinok	0–0 (1–4 p)	ŠK Vrakuňa
ŠK Veľké Zálužie	0–4	KFC Kalná nad Hronom
OFK Mokrý Háj	0–0 (0–3 p)	OK Častkovce
FK Slovan Kúpele Sliač	4–2	Tatran VLM Pliešovce
FK Brezno	2–0	FTC Fiľakovo
ŠK Šašová	1–5	ŠK Badín
MFK Detva	0–3	FK Podkonice
Iskra Hnúšťa	1–2	Baník Kalinovo
OFK Hliník nad Hronom	2–3	FK FILJO Ladomerská Vieska
Partizán Osrblie	0–9	FK Spišská Nová Ves
Vinohrad Čebovce	0–1	TJD Príbelce
Baník Veľký Krtíš	2–1	OŠK Radzovce
Slovan Tomášovce	1–1 (6–7 p)	MŠK Rimavská Sobota
Strojár Krupina	1–3	ŠK Vinica
MFK Spartak Hriňová	5–4	MFK Žarnovica
FK 09 Bacúch	2–2 (6–5 p)	ŠK Závažná Poruba
Sklotatran Poltár	1–2	Slávia TU Košice
TJ Družstevník Bitarová	3–5	MŠK Námestovo
Slovan Trstená	0–2	Sokol Zubrohlava
Spartak Vysoká Nad Kysucou	1–4	ŠK Javorník Makov
FK Slovenské Ďarmoty	0–2	MŠK Novohrad Lučenec
OŠK Liptovská Teplá	1–0	Družstevník Liptovská Štiavnica
FK Nižná	1–2	ŠK Tvrdošín
Slovan Bystrička	2–0	Dynamo Diviaky
TJ Tatran Chlebnice	1–0	Tatran Oravské Veselé
TJ Višňové	0–2	OŠK Baník Stráňavy
Pokrok Stará Bystrica	1–4	FK Tatran Turzovka
Turčianska Štiavnička	0–3	Hamsik Academy
Slovan Dudince	0–3	ŠK Prameň Kováčová
Sokol Liesek	1–2	MŠK Fomat Martin
FK Olcnava	2–1	MFK Gelnica
OFK Vikartovce	0–4	MŠK Spišské Podhradie
TJ Dvorníky-Včeláre	1–4	FK Kechnec
FK Krásna	1–7	MFK Vranov nad Topľou
Lokomotíva Košice	2–2 (1–4 p)	Spartak Medzev
MFK Ťahanovce	1–5	TJ Mladosť Kalša
Lokomotíva Ruskov	0–5	MFK Snina
ŠK Nacina Ves	2–0	OŠK Pavlovce nad Uhom
OŠK Fintice	0–4	Pivovar Veľký Šariš
FK Šarišské Dravce	4–0	Slovan Sabinov
Sokol Torysa	0–2	MFK Stará Ľubovňa
FK Gemerská Hôrka	0–4	MFK Rožňava
OŠK Teplička	2–4	1. FK Svidník
Krásnohorské Podhradie	0–0 (5–4 p)	OŠK Rudňany
Družstevník Borov	2–2 (3–1 p)	FK Gerlachov
MFK Bytča	7–3	ŠK Belá
FC Komjatice	1–7	FKM Nové Zámky
11 August 2022
FK Svit	0–0 (4–5 p)	1. MFK Kežmarok
FK Jesenské	2–2 (4–5 p)	FC 98 Hajnáčka
17 August 2022
FK Veľká Lomnica	1–8	Partizán Bardejov
Busov Gaboltov	1–2	MFK Slovan Giraltovce
Slovan Modra	0–8	FC Slovan Galanta
OŠK Bešeňová	2–3	ŠK Odeva Lipany
Sokol Chminianska	0–6	MŠK Tesla Stropkov
ŠK Lozorno	0–3	OFK Dunajská Lužná

== Second round ==
Team 1	Score	Team 2
9 August 2022
Lokomotíva DNV	2–1	MFK Rusovce
10 August 2022
TJ Salka	0–5	Veľké Ludince
16 August 2022
OFK Tovarníky	0–3	Spartak Myjava
23 August 2022
Krásnohorské Podhradie	0–1	MFK Zemplín Michalovce
Družstevník Borov	0–8	FK Slavoj Trebišov
Slovan Zemianske Kostoľany	0–3	ŠKF Sereď
24 August 2022
OŠK Liptovská Teplá	0–2	MFK Ružomberok
TJ Slavoj Boleráz	1–1 (2–4 p)	Spartak Trnava
Slovan Hlohovec	0–14	AS Trenčín
FK Čadca	0–2	Tatran Liptovský Mikuláš
OFK Dunajská Lužná	0–5	Zlaté Moravce
FC Baník Prievidza	0–4	MFK Skalica
ŠK Vinica	1–7	Dukla Banská Bystrica
Družstevník Trstice	1–7	KFC Komárno
ŠK Nacina Ves	1–4	FC Košice
Sokol Zubrohlava	1–3	FK Humenné
TJ Lokomotíva Bánov	1–3	ŠTK 1914 Šamorín
TJ Kopčany	0–7	FC Petržalka
FC Malacky	1–5	FK Dubnica
ŠK Tomášov	2–3	MŠK Púchov
OŠK Baník Stráňavy	1–4	MŠK Považská Bystrica
Spartak Medzev	1–2	Tatran Prešov
FK Tatran Turzovka	1–5	MFK Dolný Kubín
ŠK Čierne	1–4	FK Poprad
TJ Jasenov	4–0	MFK Slovan Giraltovce
Kysucké Nové Mesto	1–0	Hamsik Academy
FK Sitno Banská Štiavnica	1–3	Baník Kalinovo
MFK Spartak Hriňová	0–3	FK Šalková
OŠK Trenčianske Stankovce	2–0	AFC Nové Mesto
Chocholná-Velčice	1–4	TJ Partizán Prečín
Thermál Veľký Meder	2–1	OFK Malženice
TJ Rovinka	0–0 (3–4 p)	Inter Bratislava
Slovan Most	1–2	FC Slovan Galanta
Družstevník Radimov	1–3	OK Častkovce
SK Kmeťovo	1–3	FKM Nové Zámky
TJ Sokol Medzibrod	1–3	FK Spišská Nová Ves
FK Vápeč Horná Poruba	1–4	TJ Jednota Bánová
ŠK Bernolákovo	0–4	ŠK Vrakuňa
ŠK Šenkvice	2–2 (6–5 p)	ŠK Igram
TJ Družstevník Malá Mača	1–0	ŠK Bešeňov
1. MFK Kežmarok	2–1	Partizán Bardejov
Pivovar Veľký Šariš	0–4	MŠK Tesla Stropkov
Slovan Bystrička	6–3	TJ Tatran Chlebnice
FK 09 Bacúch	3–3 (6–5 p)	Slávia TU Košice
ŠK Javorník Makov	4–2	MŠK Novohrad Lučenec
ŠK Badín	0–1	FK Podkonice
FK Slovan Kúpele Sliač	0–2	FK Brezno
MFK Rožňava	2–0	1. FK Svidník
FK Šarišské Dravce	0–1	MFK Stará Ľubovňa
FK Kechnec	1–0	MFK Vranov nad Topľou
FK Olcnava	1–3	MŠK Spišské Podhradie
MFK Bytča	1–2	MŠK Fomat Martin
31 August 2022
OFK Solčany	1–2	FK Rača
OŠK Švošov	3–0	MŠK Námestovo
Baník Veľký Krtíš	0–2	MŠK Rimavská Sobota
TJ Mladosť Kalša	1–3	MFK Snina
6 September 2022
FK FILJO Ladomerská Vieska	2–4	DAC Dunajská Streda
TJD Príbelce	1–4	MŠK Žilina
ŠK Tvrdošín	0–4	Železiarne Podbrezová
ŠK Prameň Kováčová	0–3	FK Pohronie
7 September 2022
MFK Vrbové	1–4	FK Beluša
ŠK Nevidzany	0–1	KFC Kalná nad Hronom
FC 98 Hajnáčka	2–3	ŠK Odeva Lipany
24 September 2022
OFK Branč	0–2	Slovan Bratislava

== Third round ==
Team 1	Score	Team 2
13 September 2022
FK Kechnec	2–3	Tatran Prešov
14 September 2022
Lokomotíva DNV	3–1	ŠK Vrakuňa
Veľké Ludince	1–6	KFC Komárno
ŠKF Sereď	1–1 (4–2 p)	FK Rača
MFK Rožňava	0–7	MFK Zemplín Michalovce
TJ Jasenov	1–3	FK Slavoj Trebišov
Inter Bratislava	1–1 (3–4 p)	Zlaté Moravce
ŠK Šenkvice	1–7	FK Dubnica
FK Beluša	0–4	AS Trenčín
TJ Partizán Prečín	0–1	TJ Jednota Bánová
OK Častkovce	2–1	FC Petržalka
FK Brezno	2–1	FK Podkonice
Baník Kalinovo	1–10	DAC Dunajská Streda
FK Spišská Nová Ves	0–2	MŠK Žilina
FK 09 Bacúch	0–11	Tatran Liptovský Mikuláš
OŠK Švošov	0–2	FK Humenné
ŠK Javorník Makov	0–2	MFK Ružomberok
Kysucké Nové Mesto	0–3	MFK Dolný Kubín
1. MFK Kežmarok	2–0	MŠK Spišské Podhradie
MFK Stará Ľubovňa	1–5	MŠK Tesla Stropkov
FK Šalková	1–10	ŠK Odeva Lipany
FK Poprad	0–4	Železiarne Podbrezová
20 September 2022
MŠK Fomat Martin	0–1	FK Pohronie
21 September 2022
MŠK Rimavská Sobota	2–4	Dukla Banská Bystrica
Slovan Bystrička	1–10	MŠK Považská Bystrica
MFK Snina	1–4	FC Košice
KFC Kalná nad Hronom	0–1	Spartak Myjava
Thermál Veľký Meder	0–3	MFK Skalica
FKM Nové Zámky	1–2	ŠTK 1914 Šamorín
28 September 2022
FC Slovan Galanta	0–6	MŠK Púchov
OŠK Trenčianske Stankovce	0–6	Spartak Trnava
TJ Družstevník Malá Mača	0–7	Slovan Bratislava

== Fourth round ==
The draw for the fourth round was held on 3 October 2022.

Team 1	Score	Team 2
11 October 2022
FC Košice	2–3	KFC Komárno
18 October 2022
FK Pohronie	0–1	Tatran Liptovský Mikuláš
FK Humenné	2–1	DAC Dunajská Streda
1. MFK Kežmarok	0–1	Dukla Banská Bystrica
MŠK Považská Bystrica	2–2 (7–8 p)	Zlaté Moravce
19 October 2022
Tatran Prešov	1–0	Železiarne Podbrezová
OK Častkovce	1–2	TJ Jednota Bánová
FK Slavoj Trebišov	0–4	AS Trenčín
FK Brezno	1–3	MŠK Púchov
ŠTK 1914 Šamorín	2–1	MŠK Žilina
Lokomotíva DNV	0–3	MFK Ružomberok
Spartak Myjava	4–1	MFK Dolný Kubín
25 October 2022
FK Dubnica	0–3	MFK Zemplín Michalovce
ŠK Odeva Lipany	0–1	MFK Skalica
26 October 2022
ŠKF Sereď	0–3	Spartak Trnava
9 November 2022
MŠK Tesla Stropkov	2–3	Slovan Bratislava

== Round of 16 ==
The draw for the round of 16 was held on 27 October 2022.

Team 1	Score	Team 2
8 November 2022
Humenné (2)	0–1	Tatran Prešov (2)
Komárno (2)	2–0	Zlaté Moravce (1)
Skalica (1)	1–1 (4–3 p)	Ružomberok (1)
Spartak Trnava (1)	2–2 (4–3 p)	Zemplín Michalovce (1)
9 November 2022
Jednota Bánová (3)	0–3	Tatran Liptovský Mikuláš (1)
ŠTK Šamorín (2)	1–1 (4–3 p)	Púchov (2)
Trenčín (1)	5–0	Spartak Myjava (2)
7 February 2023
Dukla Banská Bystrica (1)	1–2	Slovan Bratislava (1)

== Quarter-finals ==
The draw for the quarter-finals was held on 22 November 2022.

=== Summary ===
Team 1	Score	Team 2
28 February 2023
Komárno (2)	0–2	Spartak Trnava (1)
1 March 2023
ŠTK Šamorín (2)	1–1 (3–4 p)	Slovan Bratislava (1)
7 March 2023
Tatran Prešov (2)	0–1	Trenčín (1)
8 March 2023
Tatran Liptovský Mikuláš (1)	2–2 (3–4 p)	Skalica (1)

=== Matches ===
28 February 2023
14:00 CET (UTC+1)

Komárno	0–2	Spartak Trnava
	Report	Mikovič 63'; Taiwo 70'

Mestský štadión, Komárno
Attendance: 920
Referee: Martin Dohál

1 March 2023
16:30 CET (UTC+1)

ŠTK Šamorín	1–1	Slovan Bratislava
Szabó 6'	Report	Barseghyan 41'
Penalties
Nagy (penalty scored); Bahi (penalty missed); Csóka (penalty scored); Szabó (penalty missed); Szolgai (penalty scored)	3–4	(penalty missed) Čavrić; (penalty scored) Lichý; (penalty scored) Kucka; (penalty scored) De Marco; (penalty scored) Weiss Jr.

MOL Aréna, Dunajská Streda
Attendance: 1,484
Referee: Erik Gemzický

7 March 2023
14:30 CET (UTC+1)

Tatran Prešov	0–1	Trenčín
	Report	Hollý 17'

Štadión Tatranu, Prešov
Attendance: 720
Referee: Marián Ruc

8 March 2023
14:30 CET (UTC+1)

Tatran Liptovský Mikuláš	2–2	Skalica
Bartoš 14' (pen.); Mášik 21' (o.g.)	Report	Mášik 44'; Podhorin 86' (pen.)
Penalties
Bedecs (penalty scored); Jendrišek (penalty missed); Popović (penalty missed); Župa (penalty scored); Staš (penalty scored); Diviš (penalty missed)	3–4	(penalty scored) Podhorin; (penalty scored) Václav; (penalty missed) Švec; (penalty scored) Haša; (penalty missed) Vlasko; (penalty scored) Yao

Stadium Liptovský Mikuláš, Liptovský Mikuláš
Attendance: 416
Referee: Peter Ziemba

== Semi-finals ==
The draw for the semi-finals was held on 2 March 2023.

=== Summary ===
Team 1	Agg.	Team 2	1st leg	2nd leg
Trenčín (1)	1–5	Spartak Trnava (1)	1–2	0–3
Slovan Bratislava (1)	5–4	Skalica (1)	2–1	3–3 (a.e.t.)

=== Matches ===
15 March 2023
18:00 CET (UTC+1)

Trenčín	1–2	Spartak Trnava
Hollý 55'	Report	Kóša 75'; Ofori 90+4'

Štadión Sihoť, Trenčín
Attendance: 952
Referee: Michal Očenáš
5 April 2023
18:00 CEST (UTC+2)

Spartak Trnava	3–0	Trenčín
Procházka 44'; Bukata 67'; Azevedo 89'	Report

Anton Malatinský Stadium, Trnava
Attendance: 2,099
Referee: Michal Smolák

Spartak Trnava won 5–1 on aggregate.

12 April 2023
18:00 CEST (UTC+2)

Slovan Bratislava	2–1	Skalica
Malik 19'; Weiss Jr. 88' (pen.)	Report	Morong 39'

Tehelné pole, Bratislava
Attendance: 2,157
Referee: Boris Marhefka
19 April 2023
17:00 CEST (UTC+2)

Skalica	3–3 (a.e.t.)	Slovan Bratislava
Vlasko 33'; Haša 79', 90+2'	Report	Green 58', 75'; Kankava 93'

Štadión MFK Skalica, Skalica
Attendance: 2,717
Referee: Bálint Kišš

Slovan Bratislava won 5–4 on aggregate.

== Final ==
1 May 2023
15:00 (UTC+2)

Spartak Trnava	3–1 (a.e.t.)	Slovan Bratislava
Taiwo 85'; Paur 110'; Twardzik 120+5' (pen.)	Report	Green 57'

Anton Malatinský Stadium, Trnava
Attendance: 15,427
Referee: Michal Očenáš

== See also ==
- 2022–23 Slovak First Football League
- 2023–24 UEFA Europa Conference League
