= List of Slovak football transfers winter 2023–24 =

Notable Slovak football transfers in the winter transfer window 2023–24 by club. Only transfers of the Fortuna Liga and 2. liga are included.

== Nike Liga ==
=== ŠK Slovan Bratislava ===
In: Note: Flags indicate national team as defined under FIFA eligibility rules; some limited exceptions apply. Players may hold more than one non-FIFA nationality.

No.	Pos.	Nation	Player
—	DF	GRE	Spyros Risvanis (from FC DAC 1904 Dunajská Streda)
—	FW	LUX	Gerson Rodrigues (on loan from (Ukraine) FC Dynamo Kyiv)

Out: Note: Flags indicate national team as defined under FIFA eligibility rules; some limited exceptions apply. Players may hold more than one non-FIFA nationality.

No.	Pos.	Nation	Player
—	FW	GHA	Malik Abubakari (loan return to (Sweden) Malmö FF)
—	DF	BRA	Lucas Lovat (to (Russia) FC Akhmat Grozny)
—	FW	SRB	Aleksandar Čavrić (on loan to (Japan) Kashima Antlers)
—	MF	NGA	Uche Henry Agbo (Released and joined (Kazakhstan) FC Aktobe)
—	FW	LUX	Gerson Rodrigues (Loan terminated early)

=== FC DAC 1904 Dunajská Streda ===
In: Note: Flags indicate national team as defined under FIFA eligibility rules; some limited exceptions apply. Players may hold more than one non-FIFA nationality.

No.	Pos.	Nation	Player
—	MF	CRO	Ivan Dolček (from (Croatia) HNK Hajduk Split)
—	FW	EST	Oliver Jürgens (from (Hungary) Újpest FC)
—	FW	GHA	Brian Oddei (from (Croatia) NK Rudeš)
91	DF	FRA	Romaric Yapi (from (France) SC Bastia)
TBA	DF	UKR	Taras Kacharaba (from (Czech Republic) SK Slavia Prague)
TBA	MF	UKR	Ihor Kharatin (from (Poland) Legia Warsaw)
5	MF	SEN	Pape Cheikh Diop (from Free Agent)

Out: Note: Flags indicate national team as defined under FIFA eligibility rules; some limited exceptions apply. Players may hold more than one non-FIFA nationality.

No.	Pos.	Nation	Player
—	FW	GRE	Giannis Niarchos (on loan to MFK Zemplín Michalovce)
—	DF	GRE	Spyros Risvanis (Released and joined ŠK Slovan Bratislava)
—	GK	HUN	Dániel Veszelinov (to (Hungary) Fehérvár FC)
—	GK	HUN	Erik Gyurákovics (to (Hungary) Győri ETO FC)
78	DF	POR	Alex Pinto (to (Portugal) Gil Vicente F.C.)
—	MF	SVK	Dominik Veselovský (on loan to MFK Dukla Banská Bystrica)

=== FC Spartak Trnava ===
In: Note: Flags indicate national team as defined under FIFA eligibility rules; some limited exceptions apply. Players may hold more than one non-FIFA nationality.

No.	Pos.	Nation	Player
—	MF	CRO	Tomislav Krizmanić (from NK Croatia Zmijavci)
—	MF	SWE	Jaheem Burke (from (Sweden) Västerås SK Fotboll)
—	FW	CZE	Tomáš Poznar (from Free Agent)
—	FW	SVK	Michal Ďuriš (from (Cyprus) Othellos Athienou FC)

Out: Note: Flags indicate national team as defined under FIFA eligibility rules; some limited exceptions apply. Players may hold more than one non-FIFA nationality.

No.	Pos.	Nation	Player
—	FW	MKD	Milan Ristovski (to (Czech Republic) Bohemians 1905)
—	MF	CRC	Ricardo Peña (Released)
—	FW	SVK	Michal Ďuriš (loan return to (Cyprus) Othellos Athienou FC)
—	GK	SVK	Michal Šulla (Released and joined (Czech Republic) SK Líšeň)
4	DF	ARG	Nicolás Gorosito (to FC Košice)

=== FK Železiarne Podbrezová ===
In: Note: Flags indicate national team as defined under FIFA eligibility rules; some limited exceptions apply. Players may hold more than one non-FIFA nationality.

No.	Pos.	Nation	Player
—	MF	SVK	Vincent Chyla (from MŠK Žilina B)
20	DF	SVK	Peter Kováčik (on loan from (Italy) Como 1907)
—	FW	GAM	Alasana Yirajang (from (The Gambia) Real de Banjul FC)

Out: Note: Flags indicate national team as defined under FIFA eligibility rules; some limited exceptions apply. Players may hold more than one non-FIFA nationality.

No.	Pos.	Nation	Player
—	GK	SVK	Richard Ludha (to (Czech Republic) FK Teplice)
—	FW	SVK	Samuel Ďatko (to MŠK Žilina)
—	MF	SVK	Patrik Blahút (on loan to (Czech Republic) 1. FC Slovácko)
—	FW	SVK	Marek Kuzma (to FC ViOn Zlaté Moravce)
20	DF	SVK	Peter Kováčik (to (Italy) Como 1907)

=== MFK Dukla Banská Bystrica ===
In: Note: Flags indicate national team as defined under FIFA eligibility rules; some limited exceptions apply. Players may hold more than one non-FIFA nationality.

No.	Pos.	Nation	Player
76	MF	BRA	Marcos Paulo De Oliveira (from MFK Snina)
20	MF	SVK	Dominik Veselovský (on loan from FC DAC 1904 Dunajská Streda)

Out: Note: Flags indicate national team as defined under FIFA eligibility rules; some limited exceptions apply. Players may hold more than one non-FIFA nationality.

No.	Pos.	Nation	Player
—	FW	URU	Enzo Arevalo (Released and joined MFK Zemplín Michalovce)
—	DF	SVK	Jakub Uhrinčať (on loan to (Czech Republic) AC Sparta Prague)
—	MF	SVK	Adrián Káčerík (on loan to (Slovakia) FC Tatran Prešov)
—	MF	SVK	Samuel Svetlík (on loan to (Slovakia) MFK Dolný Kubín)
—	MF	SVK	Matúš Köröš (on loan to (Slovakia) MFK Dolný Kubín)
—	DF	SVK	Šimon Mičuda (loan return to (Slovakia) AS Trenčín)
—	DF	COL	Thomas Maya (released)

=== MŠK Žilina ===
In: Note: Flags indicate national team as defined under FIFA eligibility rules; some limited exceptions apply. Players may hold more than one non-FIFA nationality.

No.	Pos.	Nation	Player
—	FW	SVK	Samuel Ďatko (from FK Železiarne Podbrezová)

Out: Note: Flags indicate national team as defined under FIFA eligibility rules; some limited exceptions apply. Players may hold more than one non-FIFA nationality.

No.	Pos.	Nation	Player
—	MF	SVK	Matúš Rusnák (to (Czech Republic) FC Baník Ostrava)
—	DF	SVK	Adam Kopas (on loan to (Cyprus) Othellos Athienou FC)
25	DF	SVK	Tomáš Nemčík (on loan to (Norway) Rosenborg BK)
29	FW	SVK	Dávid Ďuriš (on loan to (Italy) Ascoli)
13	FW	GHA	Henry Addo (to (Israel) Maccabi Tel Aviv F.C.)
—	MF	SVK	Patrik Myslovič (to (Bulgaria) PFC Levski Sofia)

=== MFK Ružomberok ===
In: Note: Flags indicate national team as defined under FIFA eligibility rules; some limited exceptions apply. Players may hold more than one non-FIFA nationality.

No.	Pos.	Nation	Player
TBA	DF	SVK	Alexander Mojžiš (loan return from Debreceni VCS)
TBA	DF	SVK	Matej Madleňák (loan return from FC Baník Ostrava)

Out: Note: Flags indicate national team as defined under FIFA eligibility rules; some limited exceptions apply. Players may hold more than one non-FIFA nationality.

No.	Pos.	Nation	Player
—	GK	SVK	Ivan Krajčírik (to (Poland) Widzew Łódź)
—	GK	SVK	Mário Mrva (to (Slovakia) FK Železiarne Podbrezová)
TBA	DF	SVK	Matej Madleňák (on loan to SK Dynamo České Budějovice)

=== MFK Skalica ===
In: Note: Flags indicate national team as defined under FIFA eligibility rules; some limited exceptions apply. Players may hold more than one non-FIFA nationality.

No.	Pos.	Nation	Player
—	MF	ENG	Max Thompson (from Free Agent)
—	DF	FIN	Matej Hradecky (from Free Agent)

Out: Note: Flags indicate national team as defined under FIFA eligibility rules; some limited exceptions apply. Players may hold more than one non-FIFA nationality.

No.	Pos.	Nation	Player
—	FW	CRO	Dino Špehar (Released)

=== AS Trenčín ===
In: Note: Flags indicate national team as defined under FIFA eligibility rules; some limited exceptions apply. Players may hold more than one non-FIFA nationality.

No.	Pos.	Nation	Player
—	FW	SRB	Armin Đerlek (from (Turkey) Sivasspor)
—	MF	NED	Samir Ben Sallam (from (Cyprus) Karmiotissa Polemidion FC)

Out: Note: Flags indicate national team as defined under FIFA eligibility rules; some limited exceptions apply. Players may hold more than one non-FIFA nationality.

No.	Pos.	Nation	Player
—	DF	CYP	Strahinja Kerkez (Released)
—	FW	NED	Dabney dos Santos (Released)
93	FW	NGA	Jesse Akila (Released)

=== MFK Zemplín Michalovce ===
In: Note: Flags indicate national team as defined under FIFA eligibility rules; some limited exceptions apply. Players may hold more than one non-FIFA nationality.

No.	Pos.	Nation	Player
—	FW	GRE	Giannis Niarchos (on loan from FC DAC 1904 Dunajská Streda)
—	DF	GEO	Tornike Dzotsenidze (from (Georgia (country)) FC Dila Gori)
—	MF	URU	Enzo Arevalo (from MFK Dukla Banská Bystrica)

Out: Note: Flags indicate national team as defined under FIFA eligibility rules; some limited exceptions apply. Players may hold more than one non-FIFA nationality.

No.	Pos.	Nation	Player

=== FC ViOn Zlaté Moravce ===
In: Note: Flags indicate national team as defined under FIFA eligibility rules; some limited exceptions apply. Players may hold more than one non-FIFA nationality.

No.	Pos.	Nation	Player
—	GK	SVK	Patrik Lukáč (from (Poland) Podbeskidzie)
—	FW	SVK	Karol Mészáros (from (Czech Republic) FC Slovan Liberec)
—	FW	GEO	Iuri Tabatadze (on loan from (Georgia (country)) FC Saburtalo Tbilisi)}
—	DF	GEO	Jemali-Giorgi Jinjolava (on loan from (Georgia (country)) FC Saburtalo Tbilisi)
—	MF	GEO	Levan Nonikashvili (on loan from (Georgia (country)) FC Saburtalo Tbilisi)
—	DF	FRA	Soufiane Dramé (on loan from (Czech Republic) FK Teplice)
—	MF	CRO	Andrija Balić (from (Bosnia and Herzegovina) Zrinjski Mostar)
—	FW	SVK	Marek Kuzma (from FK Železiarne Podbrezová)

Out: Note: Flags indicate national team as defined under FIFA eligibility rules; some limited exceptions apply. Players may hold more than one non-FIFA nationality.

No.	Pos.	Nation	Player
—	MF	ENG	James Weir (Released)
—	GK	CZE	Milan Knobloch (Released)
—	FW	CRO	Patrik Mijić (Released)
—	FW	SVK	Roman Čerepkai (loan return to (Czech Republic) FK Teplice)
—	DF	SVK	Milan Kvocera (Released)
—	FW	NGA	Johnson Nsumoh (Released)

=== FC Košice ===
In: Note: Flags indicate national team as defined under FIFA eligibility rules; some limited exceptions apply. Players may hold more than one non-FIFA nationality.

No.	Pos.	Nation	Player
—	GK	POR	Cristiano (from Free Agent)
—	FW	USA	Zyen Jones (from Free Agent)
—	FW	GAB	Moussango Obounet (on loan from (Hungary) Diósgyőri VTK)
—	DF	FRA	Nassim Innocenti (from (France) Valenciennes FC)
—	DF	PAN	Eric Davis (from Free Agent)
—	DF	ARG	Nicolás Gorosito (from Spartak Trnava)

Out: Note: Flags indicate national team as defined under FIFA eligibility rules; some limited exceptions apply. Players may hold more than one non-FIFA nationality.

No.	Pos.	Nation	Player
—	FW	SEN	Sidath Sow (on loan to Spartak Myjava)
—	MF	SVK	Marcel Vasiľ (Released and joined (Italy) Gioiese 1918)
—	MF	SVK	Samuel Segeďa (on loan to Redfox FC Stará Ľubovňa)
—	FW	SEN	Landing Sagna (to (Czech Republic) FC Vysočina Jihlava)
—	MF	SVK	Erik Liener (on loan to FC Petržalka)
5	DF	SVK	Jakub Jakubko (on loan to FC Petržalka)
—	GK	SVK	Matúš Putnocký (to Partizán Bardejov)

== 2. liga ==
=== MFK Tatran Liptovský Mikuláš ===
In: Note: Flags indicate national team as defined under FIFA eligibility rules; some limited exceptions apply. Players may hold more than one non-FIFA nationality.

No.	Pos.	Nation	Player

Out: Note: Flags indicate national team as defined under FIFA eligibility rules; some limited exceptions apply. Players may hold more than one non-FIFA nationality.

No.	Pos.	Nation	Player

=== FC Tatran Prešov ===
In: Note: Flags indicate national team as defined under FIFA eligibility rules; some limited exceptions apply. Players may hold more than one non-FIFA nationality.

No.	Pos.	Nation	Player
—	MF	SVK	Jozef Špyrka (on loan from Podbrezová)
—	FW	SVK	Daniel Pavúk (from Michalovce)
—	FW	BRA	Arthur Legnani (on loan from Myjava)
—	MF	SVK	Adrián Káčerík (on loan from Dukla Banská Bystrica)

Out: Note: Flags indicate national team as defined under FIFA eligibility rules; some limited exceptions apply. Players may hold more than one non-FIFA nationality.

No.	Pos.	Nation	Player
11	DF	SRB	Mihajilo Popović (Released)
13	GK	UKR	Ivan Tyurin (Released)

=== KFC Komárno ===
In: Note: Flags indicate national team as defined under FIFA eligibility rules; some limited exceptions apply. Players may hold more than one non-FIFA nationality.

No.	Pos.	Nation	Player
—	FW	SVK	Jakub Sylvestr (from Free Agent)

Out: Note: Flags indicate national team as defined under FIFA eligibility rules; some limited exceptions apply. Players may hold more than one non-FIFA nationality.

No.	Pos.	Nation	Player

=== MŠK Žilina B ===
In: Note: Flags indicate national team as defined under FIFA eligibility rules; some limited exceptions apply. Players may hold more than one non-FIFA nationality.

No.	Pos.	Nation	Player

Out: Note: Flags indicate national team as defined under FIFA eligibility rules; some limited exceptions apply. Players may hold more than one non-FIFA nationality.

No.	Pos.	Nation	Player
—	MF	SVK	Vincent Chyla (to Podbrezová)

=== FK Pohronie ===
In: Note: Flags indicate national team as defined under FIFA eligibility rules; some limited exceptions apply. Players may hold more than one non-FIFA nationality.

No.	Pos.	Nation	Player

Out: Note: Flags indicate national team as defined under FIFA eligibility rules; some limited exceptions apply. Players may hold more than one non-FIFA nationality.

No.	Pos.	Nation	Player

=== ŠK Slovan Bratislava B ===
In: Note: Flags indicate national team as defined under FIFA eligibility rules; some limited exceptions apply. Players may hold more than one non-FIFA nationality.

No.	Pos.	Nation	Player

Out: Note: Flags indicate national team as defined under FIFA eligibility rules; some limited exceptions apply. Players may hold more than one non-FIFA nationality.

No.	Pos.	Nation	Player

=== Spartak Myjava ===
In: Note: Flags indicate national team as defined under FIFA eligibility rules; some limited exceptions apply. Players may hold more than one non-FIFA nationality.

No.	Pos.	Nation	Player

Out: Note: Flags indicate national team as defined under FIFA eligibility rules; some limited exceptions apply. Players may hold more than one non-FIFA nationality.

No.	Pos.	Nation	Player

=== FC ŠTK 1914 Šamorín ===
In: Note: Flags indicate national team as defined under FIFA eligibility rules; some limited exceptions apply. Players may hold more than one non-FIFA nationality.

No.	Pos.	Nation	Player

Out: Note: Flags indicate national team as defined under FIFA eligibility rules; some limited exceptions apply. Players may hold more than one non-FIFA nationality.

No.	Pos.	Nation	Player

=== MŠK Považská Bystrica ===
In: Note: Flags indicate national team as defined under FIFA eligibility rules; some limited exceptions apply. Players may hold more than one non-FIFA nationality.

No.	Pos.	Nation	Player

Out: Note: Flags indicate national team as defined under FIFA eligibility rules; some limited exceptions apply. Players may hold more than one non-FIFA nationality.

No.	Pos.	Nation	Player

=== MŠK Púchov ===
In: Note: Flags indicate national team as defined under FIFA eligibility rules; some limited exceptions apply. Players may hold more than one non-FIFA nationality.

No.	Pos.	Nation	Player

Out: Note: Flags indicate national team as defined under FIFA eligibility rules; some limited exceptions apply. Players may hold more than one non-FIFA nationality.

No.	Pos.	Nation	Player
—	FW	SVK	Lukáš Letenay (to (Czech Republic) FC Slovan Liberec)

=== FK Slavoj Trebišov ===
In: Note: Flags indicate national team as defined under FIFA eligibility rules; some limited exceptions apply. Players may hold more than one non-FIFA nationality.

No.	Pos.	Nation	Player

Out: Note: Flags indicate national team as defined under FIFA eligibility rules; some limited exceptions apply. Players may hold more than one non-FIFA nationality.

No.	Pos.	Nation	Player

=== FC Petržalka ===
In: Note: Flags indicate national team as defined under FIFA eligibility rules; some limited exceptions apply. Players may hold more than one non-FIFA nationality.

No.	Pos.	Nation	Player

Out: Note: Flags indicate national team as defined under FIFA eligibility rules; some limited exceptions apply. Players may hold more than one non-FIFA nationality.

No.	Pos.	Nation	Player

=== MFK Dolný Kubín ===
In: Note: Flags indicate national team as defined under FIFA eligibility rules; some limited exceptions apply. Players may hold more than one non-FIFA nationality.

No.	Pos.	Nation	Player

Out: Note: Flags indicate national team as defined under FIFA eligibility rules; some limited exceptions apply. Players may hold more than one non-FIFA nationality.

No.	Pos.	Nation	Player

=== FK Humenné ===
In: Note: Flags indicate national team as defined under FIFA eligibility rules; some limited exceptions apply. Players may hold more than one non-FIFA nationality.

No.	Pos.	Nation	Player

Out: Note: Flags indicate national team as defined under FIFA eligibility rules; some limited exceptions apply. Players may hold more than one non-FIFA nationality.

No.	Pos.	Nation	Player

=== OFK Malženice ===
In: Note: Flags indicate national team as defined under FIFA eligibility rules; some limited exceptions apply. Players may hold more than one non-FIFA nationality.

No.	Pos.	Nation	Player

Out: Note: Flags indicate national team as defined under FIFA eligibility rules; some limited exceptions apply. Players may hold more than one non-FIFA nationality.

No.	Pos.	Nation	Player

=== FK Spišská Nová Ves ===
In: Note: Flags indicate national team as defined under FIFA eligibility rules; some limited exceptions apply. Players may hold more than one non-FIFA nationality.

No.	Pos.	Nation	Player

Out: Note: Flags indicate national team as defined under FIFA eligibility rules; some limited exceptions apply. Players may hold more than one non-FIFA nationality.

No.	Pos.	Nation	Player
