= Marko Totka =

Slovak footballer

Personal information
- Full name: Marko Totka
- Date of birth: 12 September 2000 (age 26)
- Place of birth: Skalica, Slovakia
- Height: 1.73 m (5 ft 8 in)
- Position: Midfielder

Team information
- Current team: ViOn Zlaté Moravce
- Number: 27

Youth career
- 2004–2009: Skalica
- 2009–2016: Senica
- 2016–2017: Skalica
- 2017–2019: Senica

Senior career*
Years	Team	Apps	(Gls)
2018−2021	Senica	47	(0)
2021	Sokol Lanžhot	13	(0)
2022	Senica	11	(0)
2022−2023	Liptovský Mikuláš	17	(0)
2023−2024	Sokol Lanžhot	42	(8)
2024−2025	Redfox Stará Ľubovňa	25	(2)
2025−2026	ViOn Zlaté Moravce	29	(1)
2026-	Šamorín	0	(0)

International career^{‡}
2020	Slovakia U21	1	(0)
- * Club domestic league appearances and goals as of 25 May 2026 ‡ National team caps and goals as of 17 November 2020

Marko Totka (born 12 September 2000) is a Slovak footballer who plays for Šamorín as a midfielder.

== Club career ==
=== FK Senica ===
Totka made his Fortuna Liga debut for Senica against ViOn Zlaté Moravce on 18 May 2019. During this home fixture, he came on as a replacement for Sacha Petshi, as Senica was in a 2 goal lead. Totka's side held on to the lead and had managed to avoid relegation. In the final match of the season, Totka was fielded again for the entire duration of the away match against Železiarne Podbrezová, who were to be relegated. Senica had lost the game 1:0, after a goal by Daniel Pavúk.
