= Matej Slávik =

Slovak footballer

Personal information
- Full name: Matej Slávik
- Date of birth: 5 August 1994 (age 32)
- Place of birth: Ilava, Slovakia
- Height: 1.92 m (6 ft 4 in)
- Position: Goalkeeper

Team information
- Current team: Zlaté Moravce
- Number: 1

Youth career
- Dubnica

Senior career*
| Years | Team | Apps | (Gls) |
| 2012–2015 | Dubnica | 34 | (0) |
| 2015 | → DAC 1904 (loan) | 0 | (0) |
| 2016–2019 | DAC 1904 | 18 | (0) |
| 2018–2019 | → Komárno (loan) | 27 | (0) |
| 2019–2020 | Komárno | 0 | (0) |
| 2020 | → Beluša (loan) | | |
| 2020–2021 | MAS Táborsko | 11 | (0) |
| 2022–2023 | Považská Bystrica | 14 | (0) |
| 2023 | → Žilina (loan) | 5 | (0) |
| 2023 | → Žilina II (loan) | 2 | (0) |
| 2023– | Zlaté Moravce | 9 | (0) |
- * Club domestic league appearances and goals as of 16 October 2023

Matej Slávik (born 5 August 1994) is a Slovak football goalkeeper who currently plays for Zlaté Moravce.

== Club career ==
=== DAC Dunajská Streda ===
Slávik made his professional Fortuna Liga debut for Dunajská Streda against Spartak Trnava on 23 October 2016.
