= Peter Ďungel =

Slovak footballer

Personal information
- Full name: Peter Ďungel
- Date of birth: 6 September 1993 (age 33)
- Place of birth: Nededza, Slovakia
- Height: 1.88 m (6 ft 2 in)
- Position: Midfielder

Team information
- Current team: Fomat Martin
- Number: 10

Youth career
- 2004–2008: ŠK Belá
- 2008–2009: Jednota Bánová
- 2009–2012: Žilina

Senior career*
Years	Team	Apps	(Gls)
2012–2017	Žilina B		
2012–2013	Liptovský Mikuláš	13	(0)
2013–2016	Fomat Martin	121	(39)
2017–2019	Pohronie	44	(14)
2018	→ Senica (loan)	6	(0)
2019	Stal Mielec	1	(0)
2019	→ Ružomberok (loan)	2	(0)
2020–2022	Ružomberok	40	(2)
2022–2023	Liptovský Mikuláš	9	(0)
2023	Považská Bystrica	12	(1)
2023–	Fomat Martin	15	(5)
- * Club domestic league appearances and goals as of 22:11, 9 January 2024 (UTC)

Peter Ďungel (born 6 September 1993) is a Slovak professional footballer who plays as a midfielder for Fomat Martin.

== Club career ==
Ďungel made his Fortuna Liga debut for Senica in a 0–2 home defeat to DAC 1904 Dunajská Streda on 18 February 2018.
