= Lukáš Bielák =

Slovak footballer

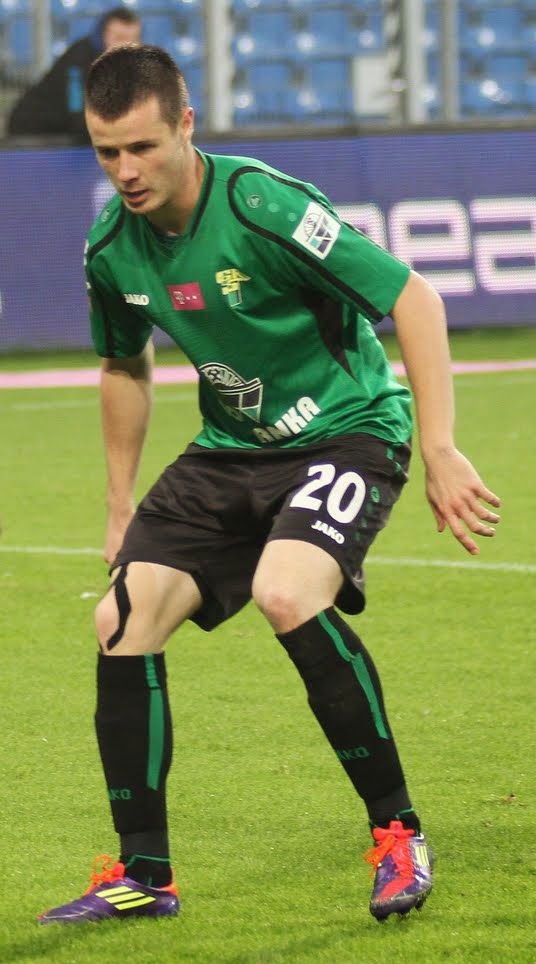

Personal information
- Full name: Lukáš Bielák
- Date of birth: 14 December 1986 (age 39)
- Place of birth: Ružomberok, Czechoslovakia
- Height: 1.84 m (6 ft 0 in)
- Position: Centre-back

Team information
- Current team: Závažná Poruba; Liptovský Mikuláš (sporting director)

Senior career*
Years	Team	Apps	(Gls)
2006–2007	FK Rača		
2007–2008	Liptovský Mikuláš		
2008–2013	Ružomberok	74	(2)
2013–2016	Górnik Łęczna	67	(2)
2016–2017	Bytovia Bytów	10	(1)
2017–2019	ŁKS Łódź	29	(1)
2019–2021	Stal Mielec	29	(0)
2020–2021	→ GKS Jastrzębie (loan)	25	(0)
2021	Podhale Nowy Targ	15	(1)
2022–2024	Liptovský Mikuláš	37	(0)
2023	→ Dolný Kubín (loan)	12	(1)
2024–	Závažná Poruba		
- * Club domestic league appearances and goals as of 22 June 2024

Lukáš Bielák (born 14 December 1986) is a Slovak professional footballer who plays as a centre-back for Závažná Poruba. He also serves as the sporting director of Liptovský Mikuláš.

== Club career ==
On 5 October 2020, he joined GKS Jastrzębie on loan.

== Honours ==
Stal Mielec

- I liga: 2019–20
