= Dyjan =

Brazilian footballer (born 1991)

Dyjan de Azevedo
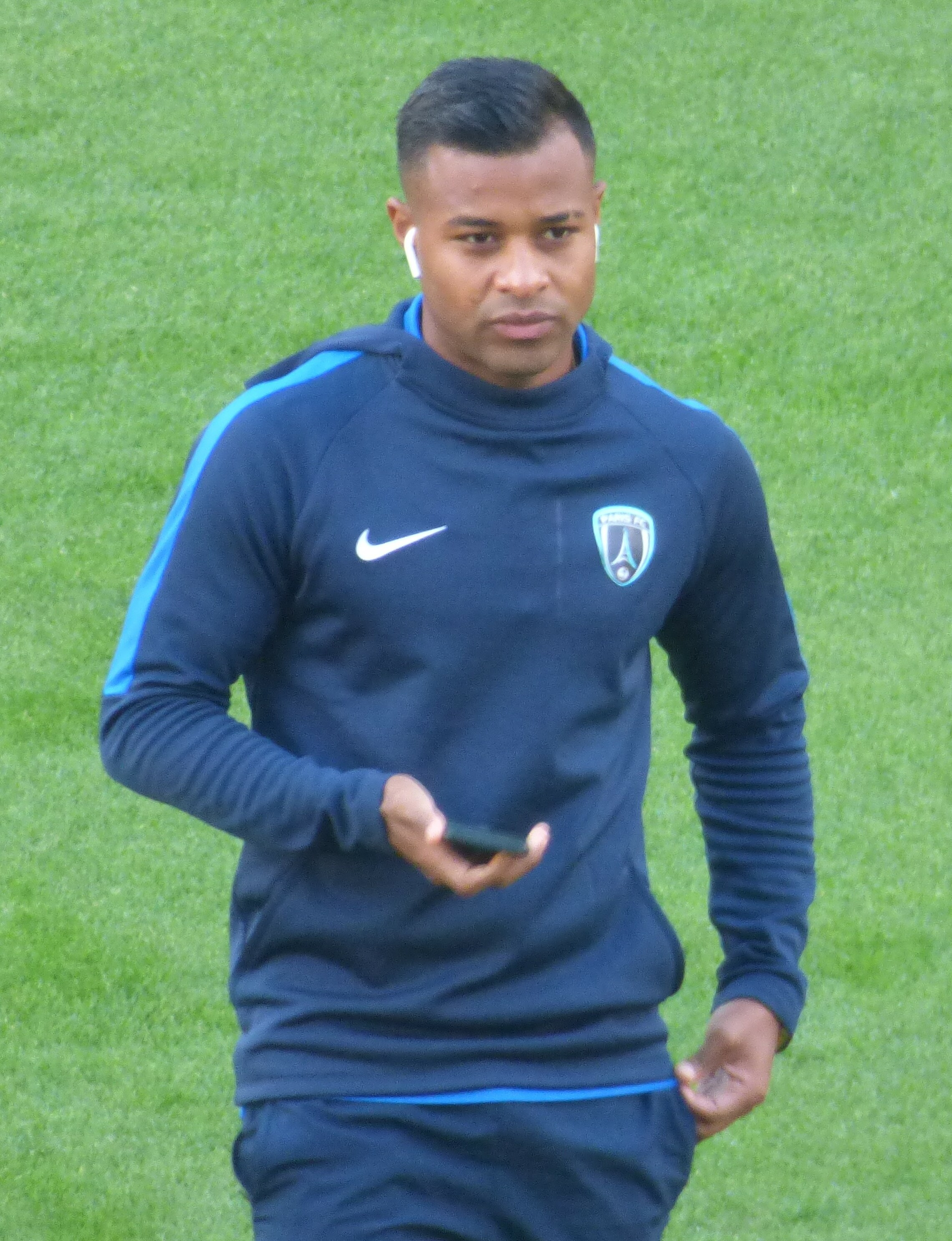
- Azevedo in 2018 with Paris FC

Personal information
- Full name: Dyjan Carlos de Azevedo
- Date of birth: 23 June 1991 (age 35)
- Place of birth: Dois Córregos, Brazil
- Height: 1.68 m (5 ft 6 in)
- Position: Winger

Team information
- Current team: Motorlet Prague
- Number: 19

Youth career
- Honvéd Budapest

Senior career*
Years	Team	Apps	(Gls)
2010–2011	Honvéd Budapest	0	(0)
2010–2011	Honvéd Budapest II	21	(1)
2011–2012	Bodva Moldava nad Bodvou	30	(20)
2012–2013	Partizán Bardejov	53	(15)
2014–2021	Baník Ostrava	138	(24)
2018–2019	→ Paris (loan)	6	(1)
2018–2019	→ Paris B (loan)	12	(2)
2022–2023	Spartak Trnava	37	(0)
2023–2024	OFK Malženice	13	(2)
2024–2025	Slovácko	8	(0)
2025	Slovácko B	13	(1)
2025–	Motorlet Prague	1	(0)
- * Club domestic league appearances and goals as of 20 September 2025

Dyjan Carlos de Azevedo (born 23 June 1991), known as Dyjan, is a Brazilian professional footballer who plays as a winger for Motorlet Prague. He previously played for Baník Ostrava and Slovácko.

== Honours ==
Spartak Trnava

- Slovak Cup: 2021–22, 2022–23
