= Rastislav Václavik =

Slovak footballer

Personal information
- Full name: Rastislav Václavik
- Date of birth: 28 February 1997 (age 29)
- Place of birth: Bátka, Slovakia
- Height: 1.92 m (6 ft 4 in)
- Position: Midfielder

Team information
- Current team: Podhale Nowy Targ
- Number: 8

Youth career
- –2011: ŠK Tempus Rimavská Sobota
- 2011–2015: Žilina

Senior career*
Years	Team	Apps	(Gls)
2015–2019	Žilina B	71	(5)
2016	Žilina	0	(0)
2018	→ Rimavská Sobota (loan)	15	(2)
2019	→ Liptovský Mikuláš (loan)	10	(0)
2019–2023	Liptovský Mikuláš	87	(5)
2023–2024	Sandecja Nowy Sącz	22	(2)
2024–	Podhale Nowy Targ	59	(6)

International career
2016	Slovakia U19	6	(0)
- * Club domestic league appearances and goals as of 10:59, 31 May 2026 (UTC)

Rastislav Václavik (born 28 February 1997) is a Slovak professional footballer who plays as a midfielder for Polish II liga club Podhale Nowy Targ.

== Club career ==
=== Tatran Liptovský Mikuláš ===
Václavik made his professional debut for Tatran Liptovský Mikuláš against Pohronie on 18 September 2021, coming as substitute in the 88th minute of the match and scoring his team's fifth goal from the penalty in the 90th minute.

== Honours ==
Individual

- Slovak Super Liga Goal of the Month: October 2022
