= Tobiáš Diviš =

Slovak footballer (born 2003)

Personal information
- Date of birth: 2 December 2003 (age 22)
- Place of birth: Ružomberok, Slovakia
- Height: 1.78 m (5 ft 10 in)
- Position: Right-back

Team information
- Current team: Sandecja Nowy Sącz (on loan from Železiarne Podbrezová)
- Number: 12

Youth career
- –2018: Ružomberok
- 2018–2020: Liptovský Mikuláš

Senior career*
Years	Team	Apps	(Gls)
2020–2024	Liptovský Mikuláš	48	(4)
2024–2025	Železiarne Podbrezová	0	(0)
2024–2025	→ KFC Komárno (loan)	16	(0)
2025–2026	FK Pohronie	30	(11)
2026–	Železiarne Podbrezová	0	(0)
2026–	→ Sandecja Nowy Sącz (loan)	0	(0)

International career
2023	Slovakia U21	1	(0)
- * Club domestic league appearances and goals as of 22 May 2026

Tobiáš Diviš (born 2 December 2003) is a Slovak professional footballer who plays as a right-back for II liga club Sandecja Nowy Sącz, on loan from Železiarne Podbrezová.

== Club career ==
Diviš is a graduate of the Tatran Liptovský Mikuláš academy. As a youth player, he played as a winger, but would later play as a full-back. Diviš made his professional debut for MFK Tatran Liptovský Mikuláš against FK Senica on 16 April 2022, coming on as a substitute in the 83rd minute. On 30 July 2023, Diviš scored his first goal for Liptovský Mikuláš in a 1–0 win over Dynamo Malženice.

In the summer of 2024, Diviš moved to Železiarne Podbrezová, but was immediately sent on a season-long loan to first-tier newcomers KFC Komárno. He made his debut for the club in a 4–1 loss against reigning league champions Slovan Bratislava, playing the full match.

After his loan with Komárno, Diviš left Podbrezová to join 2. Liga club FK Pohronie. He debuted for the club in a 0–0 draw against OFK Dynamo Malženice, coming on off the bench in the 69th minute for Samuel Greško. Diviš scored in a 3–0 win against his former club Tatran Liptovský Mikuláš, scoring in the 14th minute to increase the score to 1–0. In his debut season with the club, he made a total of 30 appearances, scoring 11 goals throughout the season.

Following his performances, it was announced on 21 May 2026 that Diviš would be returning to Železiarne Podbrezová. Over two months later, on 27 July, he was sent on a season-long loan to Polish third-tier club Sandecja Nowy Sącz, with an option to make the deal permanent.

== International career ==
Diviš was nominated for the U20 team as a backup ahead of preparation matches held in Malta. He made his debut for Slovakia U21 against Hungary U21 in June 2023. He was a last-minute addition to the squad, replacing Damián Kachút.
