= Mário Mihál =

Slovak footballer

Personal information
- Full name: Mário Mihál
- Date of birth: 27 February 2001 (age 25)
- Place of birth: Borský Mikuláš, Slovakia
- Height: 1.93 m (6 ft 4 in)
- Position: Centre back

Team information
- Current team: Hodonín

Youth career
- 2007–2012: TJ Sokol Borský Mikuláš
- 2012–2020: Senica
- 2015–2016: → Spartak Myjava (loan)

Senior career*
Years	Team	Apps	(Gls)
2020	Senica	8	(0)
2020−2023	Spartak Trnava	5	(0)
2020−2021	→ Petržalka (loan)	9	(0)
2022	→ Senica (loan)	12	(0)
2022	→ Liptovský Mikuláš (loan)	6	(0)
2023	→ Považská Bystrica (loan)	1	(0)
2023−	Hodonín	0	(0)
- * Club domestic league appearances and goals as of 26 February 2023

Mário Mihál (born 27 February 2001) is a Slovak footballer who plays for Hodonín as a centre back.

== Club career ==
=== FK Senica ===
Mihál was elevated into the first team of Senica was facing financial issues in the winter of 2019/20 and had released most of their first squad foreign players. Mihál made his professional Fortuna Liga debut for Senica against DAC Dunajská Streda on 16 February 2020. Mihál had made a debut in the starting-XI in a goal-less game played in MOL Aréna, with the result being hailed as surprising, considering the winter break developments in Senica, as most of the squad had played for youth teams until that point.
