= René Dedič =

Slovak footballer

Personal information
- Full name: René Dedič
- Date of birth: 7 August 1993 (age 33)
- Place of birth: Slovakia
- Height: 1.93 m (6 ft 4 in)
- Position: Forward

Team information
- Current team: Liptovský Mikuláš (on loan from Třinec)
- Number: 66

Youth career
- TJ Kysučan Korňa
- 2007–2009: Trenčín
- Žilina

Senior career*
Years	Team	Apps	(Gls)
2011–2013	Žilina B	12	(7)
2012–2013	→ Šamorín (loan)	9	(0)
2014–2019	Fotbal Třinec	134	(30)
2019–2021	Opava	41	(5)
2021	Příbram	13	(3)
2022–	Fotbal Třinec	25	(8)
2022	→ Viktoria Plzeň (loan)	3	(0)
2023–	→ Liptovský Mikuláš (loan)	8	(1)
- * Club domestic league appearances and goals as of 3 May 2023

René Dedič (born 7 August 1993) is a Slovak professional footballer who currently plays for Slovak club MFK Tatran Liptovský Mikuláš on loan from Třinec as a forward.
