= Gergely Tumma =

Slovak under-21 international footballer

Personal information
- Full name: Gergely Tumma
- Date of birth: 10 February 2000 (age 26)
- Place of birth: Galanta, Slovakia
- Height: 1.90 m (6 ft 3 in)
- Position: Centre back

Team information
- Current team: Soroksár
- Number: 3

Youth career
- 2011–2012: Slovan Galanta
- 2013–2019: Spartak Trnava

Senior career*
Years	Team	Apps	(Gls)
2019–2023	Spartak Trnava	40	(1)
2019–2020	→ Košice (loan)	9	(0)
2023	→ Tatran Liptovský Mikuláš (loan)	9	(0)
2023–2025	Zlaté Moravce	15	(0)
2025–	Soroksár	4	(0)

International career^{‡}
2018	Slovakia U18	4	(0)
2020–	Slovakia U21	3	(0)
- * Club domestic league appearances and goals as of 10 June 2025 ‡ National team caps and goals as of 25 March 2021

Gergely Tumma (born 10 February 2000) is a Slovak footballer who plays as a centre back for Hungarian club Soroksár.

== Club career ==
During his youth, Tumma went on trial to the academy of Genoa. After being promoted to the A-team of Spartak Trnava, Tumma would join then 2. Liga club FC Košice on a one year loan. Tumma made his league debut for Spartak in a 2–0 win against Zemplín Michalovce, playing the full match. His first goal would come a few weeks later, scoring in a 1–1 draw against FK Pohronie. In 2020, he signed a 3 year extension to his contract with Trnava. Tumma featured in the final of the Slovak Cup against Slovan Bratislava, helping the club win 2–1 to become champions. After not being a part of the 24-player squad for the winter preparations, Tumma joined MFK Tatran Liptovský Mikuláš on a loan. In July 2023, it would be announced that he would be leaving Spartak to join fellow league outfit FC ViOn Zlaté Moravce, signing a 2 year contract. He debuted for ViOn in a 3–2 loss against MŠK Žilina, featuring in the entire second half.

== International career ==
Tumma was first nominated for the Slovak U21 team in 2020. He debuted in the starting line-up for the Slovak national under-21 football team in a 2–1 defeat against Georgia U21 following the injury of Martin Šulek during the pre-match warm up.

== Honours ==
Spartak Trnava

- Slovak Cup: 2021–22
