= Christián Steinhübel =

Slovak footballer

Personal information
- Date of birth: 2 October 1994 (age 32)
- Place of birth: Modra, Slovakia
- Height: 1.82 m (6 ft 0 in)
- Position: Midfielder

Youth career
- 1999–2006: Slovan Modra
- 2006–2013: Spartak Trnava

Senior career*
Years	Team	Apps	(Gls)
2013–2016	Spartak Trnava B	36	(1)
2013	→ Dubnica (loan)	10	(0)
2013–2014	→ DAC Dunajská Streda (loan)	5	(0)
2016	Sereď	15	(2)
2017–2018	Nitra	30	(1)
2019	Bruck/Leitha	6	(0)
2019–2021	Fotbal Třinec	25	(1)
2022	Pohronie	22	(6)
2023	Tatran Liptovský Mikuláš	10	(2)
2023	Zemplín Michalovce	8	(0)
2025	SKA Rostov-on-Don	0	(0)

International career
2011–2012	Slovakia U18	13	(0)
2012–2013	Slovakia U19	9	(0)
- * Club domestic league appearances and goals as of 21:04, 3 February 2025 (UTC)

Christián Steinhübel (born 2 October 1994) is a Slovak footballer who plays as a midfielder.

== Club career ==
=== Early career ===
Steinhübel was a part of the Spartak Trnava squad that won the youth league in 2012. Later that year, he would also train with the A-team. In 2015, he signed a one-year extension to his contract with Trnava.

In 2013, Steinhübel joined FC DAC 1904 Dunajská Streda on a season long loan. He made his Corgoň liga for Dunajská Streda on 19 October 2013 against Senica.

=== Pohronie ===
In winter 2022, Steinhübel joined FK Pohronie. He debuted in a 3–0 loss against AS Trenčín, playing 78 minutes. He scored in a 1–1 draw with MFK Tatran Liptovský Mikuláš. At the end of the season, Pohronie was relegated from the first league. In the 2022–23 season, due to an injury, Steinhübel wouldn't be able to play for almost half the season. He scored in his return after his injury, converting a penalty in the 66th minute of a 1–1 draw against FK Slavoj Trebišov.
