= Milan Kvocera =

Slovak footballer

Personal information
- Full name: Milan Kvocera
- Date of birth: 1 January 1998 (age 28)
- Place of birth: Považská Bystrica, Slovakia
- Height: 1.75 m (5 ft 9 in)
- Position: Winger

Team information
- Current team: Púchov
- Number: 7

Youth career
- 2007–2013: Púchov
- 2013–2016: AS Trenčín

Senior career*
Years	Team	Apps	(Gls)
2016–2019	AS Trenčín	36	(2)
2019–2020	Zemplín Michalovce	16	(2)
2020	Radomiak Radom	6	(0)
2021	Dukla Banská Bystrica	14	(3)
2021	Zemplín Michalovce	11	(0)
2022–2023	Wisła Płock	10	(0)
2023	Zlaté Moravce	0	(0)
2024–	Púchov	12	(1)

International career
2016–2017	Slovakia U19	9	(0)
2018	Slovakia U20	3	(0)
2019	Slovakia U21	3	(1)
- * Club domestic league appearances and goals as of 1 January 2025

Milan Kvocera (born 1 January 1998) is a Slovak professional footballer who plays for Púchov as a winger.

== Club career ==
=== AS Trenčín ===
Kvocera made his Fortuna Liga debut for AS Trenčín against Slovan Bratislava on 24 September 2016. Kvocera came on in the 46th minute, replacing Aliko Bala. Trenčín won the game 2:1.

=== Wisła Płock ===
After training with the team for over three weeks, on 14 July 2022 Kvocera joined Ekstraklasa side Wisła Płock on a one-year contract.

=== Zlaté Moravce ===
On 29 June 2023, Kvocera returned to Slovakia to join FC ViOn Zlaté Moravce on a one-year deal.
