= Brian Peña =

Spanish footballer (born 2002)

Personal information
- Full name: Brian Peña Perez-Vico
- Date of birth: 20 June 2002 (age 24)
- Place of birth: Vilafranca del Penedès, Spain
- Height: 1.72 m (5 ft 8 in)
- Position: Attacking midfielder

Team information
- Current team: FK Auda
- Number: 30

Youth career
- –2016: Damm
- 2016–2018: Espanyol
- 2018–2021: Barcelona

Senior career*
Years	Team	Apps	(Gls)
2021–2023	Zemplín Michalovce	43	(7)
2023–2026	Riga FC	73	(19)
2024–2026	Riga FC II	14	(7)
2026–	FK Auda	5	(0)
- * Club domestic league appearances and goals as of 12 November 2026

Brian Peña Perez-Vico (born 20 June 2002) is a Spanish professional footballer who currently plays for FK Auda as an attacking midfielder.

== Club career ==
=== MFK Zemplín Michalovce ===
Brian Peña made his Fortuna Liga debut for Zemplín Michalovce against Senica on 16 October 2021.

=== Riga FC ===
On 3 June 2023, Peña signed a contract with Latvian Higher League side Riga FC. He scored his first league goal for Riga FC in a match against their rivals RFS. He secured his team a point with his goal.

== Career statistics ==
As of match played 19 April 2025

Appearances and goals by club, season and competition
Club	Season	League			National cup (Note: Includes Slovak Cup, Latvian Cup)		Continental		Other		Total	
Club	Season	Division	Apps	Goals	Apps	Goals	Apps	Goals	Apps	Goals	Apps	Goals
Zemplín Michalovce	2021-22	Slovak 1. Liga	13	1	1	0	—		—		14	1
Zemplín Michalovce	2022-23	Slovak 1. Liga	30	6	2	0	—		—		32	6
Zemplín Michalovce	Total		43	7	3	0	—		—		46	7
Riga FC	2023	Virslīga	18	6	3	0	6 (Note: Appearance(s) in UEFA Europa Conference League)	0	—		27	6
Riga FC	2024	Virslīga	23	7	3	0	0	0	0	0	26	7
Riga FC	2025	Virslīga	8	4	0	0	0	0	1 (Note: Appearance(s) in Latvian Supercup)	0	9	4
Riga FC	Total		49	17	6	0	6	0	1	0	62	17
Career total			92	24	9	0	6	0	1	0	108	24
