= Roman Haša =

Czech footballer

Personal information
- Date of birth: 15 February 1993 (age 33)
- Place of birth: Czech Republic
- Position: Forward

Team information
- Current team: FC Strani
- Number: 23

Senior career*
Years	Team	Apps	(Gls)
2013–2016	Slovácko	16	(1)
2014	→ Fotbal Třinec (loan)	10	(1)
2016–2017	Komárno	30	(24)
2017–2020	Skalica	77	(45)
2020–2021	Karviná	25	(2)
2021–2022	Orion Tip Sereď	31	(4)
2022–2024	Skalica	53	(5)
2024-	FC Strani	4	(0)

International career
2010	Czech Republic U17	8	(1)
2010	Czech Republic U18	3	(0)
2013	Czech Republic U21	4	(0)
- * Club domestic league appearances and goals as of 28 June 2024

Roman Haša (born 15 February 1993) is a professional Czech footballer who currently plays for Czech 3rd division side FC Strani.

== Club career ==
He made his debut in the top Czech league for Slovácko in April 2013 in a match against Plzeň. In his first season in the top league, he played 7 league matches, scoring one goal. He also played in one Czech Cup match.

However, Haša did not win a stable place in the Slovácko team and so he went on loan (in addition, in 2015 he played in three MOL Cup matches for Kroměříž, which served as a feeder club for Slovácko) until he left completely in July 2016.
