= Tomche Grozdanovski =

Macedonian international footballer

Tomče Grozdanovski
Personal information
- Full name: Tomče Grozdanovski
- Date of birth: 14 March 2000 (age 26)
- Place of birth: Skopje, Macedonia
- Height: 1.79 m (5 ft 10 in)
- Position: Midfielder

Youth career
- –2016: Vardar
- 2016–2017: Metalurg Skopje
- 2017–2019: Kožuf

Senior career*
Years	Team	Apps	(Gls)
2019–2023	ViOn Zlaté Moravce	67	(0)
2021–2022	→ Dugopolje (loan)	10	(0)
2023–2024	Rabotnički	18	(0)
2024–2025	Sileks	17	(0)
2025–2026	Concordia Chiajna	0	(0)

International career^{‡}
2017–2018	Macedonia U18	4	(0)
2018	Macedonia U19	6	(0)
2019–2022	North Macedonia U21	17	(2)
2022	North Macedonia	1	(0)
- * Club domestic league appearances and goals as of 1 June 2025 ‡ National team caps and goals as of 12 June 2022

Tomče Grozdanovski (Macedonian: Томче Гроздановски; born 14 March 2000) is a Macedonian professional footballer who plays as a midfielder for Liga II club Concordia Chiajna.

== Club career ==
=== FC ViOn Zlaté Moravce ===
Grozdanovski made his Fortuna Liga debut for ViOn Zlaté Moravce against AS Trenčín on 23 February 2019.
