= Stephano Almeida =

Brazilian footballer

Personal information
- Full name: Stephano Alves de Almeida
- Date of birth: 17 September 1993 (age 33)
- Place of birth: São Paulo, Brazil
- Height: 1.81 m (5 ft 11 in)
- Position: Right-back

Team information
- Current team: Mladost DG
- Number: 27

Senior career*
Years	Team	Apps	(Gls)
–2015	Ituano		
2015–2016	Oliveira do Bairro		
2016–2017	Gafanha	8	(1)
2017–2018	Académica de Coimbra		
2019–2022	Táborsko	30	(1)
2022–2023	Zlaté Moravce	27	(5)
2023–2024	Budućnost	24	(7)
2024–2025	Ilioupolis	16	(1)
2025–	Mladost DG	28	(3)
- * Club domestic league appearances and goals as of 15 June 2026

Stephano Alves de Almeida (born 17 September 1993), known as Stephano Almeida, is a Brazilian professional footballer who plays, as a right-back for Mladost DG in Montenegro.
