= Marek Václav =

Slovak footballer

Personal information
- Full name: Marek Václav
- Date of birth: 26 July 1996 (age 30)
- Place of birth: Slovakia
- Height: 1.89 m (6 ft 2 in)
- Position: Defender

Team information
- Current team: Považská Bystrica
- Number: 4

Youth career
- TJ Žihlavník Omšenie
- 2012–2013: Dubnica
- 2014–2015: Nová Dubnica

Senior career*
| Years | Team | Apps | (Gls) |
| 2015–2017 | Nová Dubnica | | |
| 2016 | → Šaľa (loan) | 12 | (1) |
| 2016 | → Nové Mesto nad Váhom (loan) | 11 | (0) |
| 2017 | → Dubnica (loan) | | |
| 2017–2020 | Dubnica | 47 | (10) |
| 2020 | Spartak Trnava | 3 | (0) |
| 2020 | → FC Petržalka (loan) | 10 | (0) |
| 2021–2022 | FC Košice | 35 | (4) |
| 2022–2023 | Skalica | 15 | (0) |
| 2023– | Považská Bystrica | 55 | (3) |
- * Club domestic league appearances and goals as of 25 May 2026

Marek Václav (born 26 July 1996) is a Slovak footballer who plays as a defender for Považská Bystrica.

== Club career ==
Václav made his professional Fortuna Liga debut for FC Spartak Trnava against MFK Ružomberok on 11 August 2020.
