= Marcel Vasiľ =

Slovak football midfielder

Personal information
- Date of birth: 9 February 2001 (age 25)
- Place of birth: Prešov, Slovakia
- Height: 1.79 m (5 ft 10 in)
- Position: Attacking midfielder

Team information
- Current team: Nuova Sondrio
- Number: 80

Youth career
- 2008–2012: Tatran Prešov
- 2012–2017: Young Boys
- 2017–2019: Thun

Senior career*
Years	Team	Apps	(Gls)
2019	FC Lerchenfeld	4	(2)
2020	Karviná	0	(0)
2020	ROW Rybnik	17	(1)
2021–2023	Bruk-Bet Termalica	4	(0)
2022	→ Košice (loan)	13	(1)
2022	→ Železiarne Podbrezová (loan)	8	(0)
2023–2024	Košice	13	(1)
2024	Gioiese	11	(3)
2024	Fasano	11	(1)
2024–2025	Acireale	21	(0)
2025–	Nuova Sondrio	14	(5)

International career
2018	Slovakia U17	8	(1)
2019	Slovakia U18	1	(0)
2019	Slovakia U19	3	(0)
- * Club domestic league appearances and goals as of 22 February 2026

Marcel Vasiľ (born 9 February 2001) is a Slovak professional footballer who plays as an attacking midfielder for Italian Serie D club Nuova Sondrio.

== Club career ==
In January 2022, Vasiľ joined Košice on half-season loan.

On 31 August 2022, he was sent on season-long loan to Železiarne Podbrezová.

== International career ==
Vasiľ enjoyed his first Slovakia U21 national team recognition on 17 March 2022 under Jaroslav Kentoš ahead of two 2023 Under-21 European Championship qualifiers against Northern Ireland and Spain, when he was listed as an alternate to the 23-player squad.
