= Šimon Mičuda =

Slovak footballer

Personal information
- Full name: Šimon Mičuda
- Date of birth: 28 January 2004 (age 22)
- Place of birth: Ilava, Slovakia
- Height: 1.79 m (5 ft 10 in)
- Position: Right-back

Team information
- Current team: Baník Lehota pod Vtáčnikom (on loan from Opava)
- Number: 3

Youth career
- Dubnica
- AS Trenčín

Senior career*
Years	Team	Apps	(Gls)
2022–2024	AS Trenčín	18	(0)
2023	→ Banská Bystrica (loan)	2	(0)
2024	→ Púchov (loan)	13	(0)
2024–2025	Zbrojovka Brno	9	(0)
2025–	Opava	6	(0)
2025	→ Tatran Liptovský Mikuláš (loan)	5	(0)
2026–	→ Baník Lehota pod Vtáčnikom (loan)	10	(1)

International career^{‡}
2019–2020	Slovakia U16	4	(0)
2021–2022	Slovakia U18	6	(0)
2022–	Slovakia U19	6	(0)
- * Club domestic league appearances and goals as of 28 May 2026 ‡ National team caps and goals as of 11:00, 23 February 2023 (UTC)

Šimon Mičuda (born 28 January 2004) is a Slovak professional footballer who plays as a right-back for Baník Lehota pod Vtáčnikom on loan from Opava.

== Club career ==
=== AS Trenčín ===
Mičuda made his Slovak Super Liga debut for AS Trenčín in an away fixture against Skalica on 30 July 2022.

=== Zbrojovka Brno ===
In June 2024, Mičuda signed a contract with Czech National Football League club Zbrojovka Brno.

== International career ==
Mičuda was first recognised in Slovak senior national team nomination in premier nomination by Francesco Calzona in September 2022 being listed as a replacement for 2022–23 UEFA Nations League fixtures, repeating the recognition in same position ahead of November friendlies. Previously to these autumn recognitions, Mičuda had never been considered in the U21 team, not even as an alternate. He failed to penetrate into the shortlisted nomination for prospective national team players' training camp at NTC Senec in December, remaining in the role of an alternate. Mičuda was one of the players of whom former international Ján Mucha spoke with surprise and hints of criticism toward Calzona, concerning his recognition in November nomination.
