= Samuel Suľa =

Slovak footballer

Personal information
- Full name: Samuel Suľa
- Date of birth: 12 April 2000 (age 26)
- Place of birth: Slovakia
- Height: 1.78 m (5 ft 10 in)
- Position: Right-back

Team information
- Current team: ViOn Zlaté Moravce
- Number: 22

Youth career
- –2014: TJ Družstevník Krivá
- 2013: → TJ Družstevník Dlhá nad Oravou (loan)
- 2014–2016: Námestovo
- 2015–2019: Žilina

Senior career*
Years	Team	Apps	(Gls)
2017–2021	Žilina B	60	(3)
2019–2023	Žilina	7	(0)
2022–2023	→ ViOn Zlaté Moravce (loan)	40	(2)
2023–	ViOn Zlaté Moravce	56	(2)

International career^{‡}
2018	Slovakia U19	2	(0)
2021–	Slovakia U21	6	(0)
- * Club domestic league appearances and goals as of 15 June 2025 ‡ National team caps and goals as of 13:43, 8 June 2022 (UTC)

Samuel Suľa (born 12 April 2000) is a Slovak professional footballer who currently plays as a defender for ViOn Zlaté Moravce.

== Club career ==
=== MŠK Žilina ===
Suľa made his Fortuna Liga debut for Žilina against DAC Dunajská Streda on 5 May 2019. He came on as a replacement for Slovak international Jaroslav Mihalík three minutes before stoppage time. While Michal Škvarka managed to score in stoppage time, Žilina lost the home fixture 1-2.
