= Jakub Švec =

Slovak footballer

Personal information
- Date of birth: 23 July 2000 (age 26)
- Place of birth: Žiar nad Hronom, Slovakia
- Height: 1.77 m (5 ft 10 in)
- Position: Forward

Team information
- Current team: FC Marchfeld Donauauen
- Number: 10

Youth career
- 2008–2017: ViOn Zlaté Moravce
- 2015–2016: → Spartak Vráble (loan)
- 2016–2017: → Nitra (loan)

Senior career*
Years	Team	Apps	(Gls)
2017–2019	ViOn Zlaté Moravce	28	(5)
2019–2022	DAC Dunajská Streda	1	(0)
2019–2020	→ ViOn Zlaté Moravce (loan)	21	(2)
2020–2021	→ ŠTK Šamorín (loan)	18	(3)
2021–2022	→ Liptovský Mikuláš (loan)	27	(4)
2022–2024	České Budějovice	4	(0)
2023	→ MFK Skalica (loan)	10	(1)
2023–2024	→ ViOn Zlaté Moravce (loan)	20	(2)
2024–2025	Stal Stalowa Wola	29	(3)
2026–	FC Marchfeld Donauauen	14	(4)

International career
2019	Slovakia U21	3	(0)
- * Club domestic league appearances and goals as of 28 June 2026

Jakub Švec (born 23 July 2000) is a Slovak professional footballer who plays as a forward for Austrian club FC Marchfeld Donauauen.

== Career ==
Švec made his Fortuna Liga debut for ViOn Zlaté Moravce against Zemplín Michalovce on 25 November 2017.

In January 2023, Švec returned to his native Slovakia with MFK Skalica on loan until the end of the season, with his parent club being based in the Czech Republic with Dynamo České Budějovice.

On 26 June 2024, Švec joined Polish second-tier club Stal Stalowa Wola. He made his competitive debut on 3 August 2024 in a league match against Kotwica Kołobrzeg, coming on as a substitute in the second half. He scored his first goal for the club four days later in the Polish Cup, in a 4–2 victory over Olimpia Elbląg. In the next round, he also found the net against Arka Gdynia, though Stal were eliminated after a penalty shoot-out. In league competition, Švec opened his scoring account on 5 October 2024, when he struck early in a 2–2 draw with Stal Rzeszów. He scored again in the return fixture in April 2025. During the 2024–25 season, he made 20 league appearances and 2 cup appearances, recording 4 goals in all competitions.

In the 2025–26 season, he made his first appearance in round 8, on 13 September 2025, scoring the 2–2 equaliser in a match that ended with a 3–2 victory against Sandecja Nowy Sącz. He left Stal by mutual consent on 17 December 2025.

In January 2026, Švec signed with Austrian Regionalliga club FC Marchfeld Donauauen.
