= Imrich Bedecs =

Slovak footballer

Personal information
- Full name: Imrich Bedecs
- Date of birth: 12 December 1991 (age 34)
- Place of birth: Slovakia
- Height: 1.88 m (6 ft 2 in)
- Position: Centre-back

Team information
- Current team: Spartak Myjava
- Number: 24

Youth career
- –2011: ŠK Senec

Senior career*
Years	Team	Apps	(Gls)
2011–2015	ŠK Senec		
2015–2022	Třinec	148	(13)
2022–2023	Liptovský Mikuláš	26	(2)
2023–	Spartak Myjava	26	(1)
- * Club domestic league appearances and goals as of 22 June 2024

Imrich Bedecs (born 12 December 1991) is a Slovak footballer who plays for Spartak Myjava as a centre-back.

== Club career ==
=== MFK Tatran Liptovský Mikuláš ===
Bedecs made his professional debut for MFK Tatran Liptovský Mikuláš against FC DAC 1904 Dunajská Streda on 17 July 2022.
