= Daniel Pavúk =

Slovak footballer

Personal information
- Full name: Daniel Pavúk
- Date of birth: 19 March 1998 (age 28)
- Place of birth: Prešov, Slovakia
- Position: Forward

Team information
- Current team: ŠTK Šamorín
- Number: 7

Youth career
- 2005–2015: Tatran Prešov
- 2015: Nitra
- 2016–2017: Tatran Prešov

Senior career*
Years	Team	Apps	(Gls)
2017–2018	Pohronie	46	(7)
2019–2023	Železiarne Podbrezová	99	(34)
2019	→ Tatran Prešov (loan)	12	(9)
2023	Zemplín Michalovce	17	(1)
2024	Tatran Prešov	13	(4)
2024	Petržalka	14	(2)
2025–	ŠTK Šamorín	40	(6)
- * Club domestic league appearances and goals as of 25 May 2026

Daniel Pavúk (born 19 March 1998) is a Slovak footballer who plays for ŠTK Šamorín of 2. Liga as a forward.

== Club career ==
Pavúk made his professional debut for Železiarne Podbrezová against Nitra on 16 February 2019. In the 2022–23 season, Pavúk played 2,336 minutes, collecting 32 matches. He was the fifth most used player of Podbrezova in the season.

In 2019, he went out on loan to Tatran Presov. He impressed with his performances at the 2nd division club, scoring 9 goals in 12 games.

On 22 June 2023, it was announced that Pavúk would be joining MFK Zemplín Michalovce, signing a 2 year contract. He scored his first goal for the club in a 1–0 win over village club MFK Rožnava in the Slovak Cup, scoring in the 70” minute.
