= Richard Župa =

Slovak footballer

Personal information
- Full name: Richard Župa
- Date of birth: 27 April 1998 (age 28)
- Place of birth: Prešov, Slovakia
- Position: Defender

Team information
- Current team: Slávia Košice
- Number: 6

Youth career
- Tatran Prešov

Senior career*
Years	Team	Apps	(Gls)
2017	Tatran Prešov	1	(0)
2017–2021	Pohronie	69	(3)
2021–2022	Partizán Bardejov	29	(3)
2022–2023	Tatran Liptovský Mikuláš	20	(0)
2023-2025	Tatran Prešov	41	(3)
2025-	Slávia Košice	12	(1)
- * Club domestic league appearances and goals as of 25 May 2026

Richard Župa (born 27 April 1998) is a Slovak footballer who plays for Slávia Košice as a defender.

== Career ==
=== 1. FC Tatran Prešov ===
Župa made his professional debut for Tatran Prešov against Spartak Trnava on 16 April 2017 during a 4:0 defeat, coming on as a replacement for Peter Katona.
