= Mihajilo Popović =

Serbian footballer

Personal information
- Full name: Mihajilo Popović
- Date of birth: 1 January 1993 (age 33)
- Place of birth: Ruma, Serbia, FR Yugoslavia
- Height: 1.80 m (5 ft 11 in)
- Position: Right-back

Team information
- Current team: Sloboda Donji Tovarnik

Senior career*
Years	Team	Apps	(Gls)
–2011	Novi Sad		
2011–2013	Eupen		
2013–2014	Dubnica		
2014	→ Rimavská Sobota (loan)		
2015	Slovan Duslo Šaľa	9	(0)
2015–2016	Donji Srem	21	(3)
2016–2017	Zvolen	30	(2)
2017	ATSV Stadl-Paura	13	(0)
2018	Komárno	29	(0)
2019–2020	Skalica	27	(3)
2020–2021	Komárno	27	(2)
2021–2022	Sereď	29	(0)
2022–2023	Liptovský Mikuláš	23	(3)
2023	Tatran Prešov	10	(0)
2024	Sloven Ruma		
2024-	Sloboda Donji Tovarnik		
- * Club domestic league appearances and goals as of 15 October 2023

Mihajilo Popović (Serbian Cyrillic: Михајило Поповић; born 1 January 1993) is a Serbian professional footballer who plays as a right-back for Sloboda Donji Tovarnik.

== Club career ==
=== ŠKF Sereď ===
Popović made his Fortuna Liga debut for Sereď against Žilina on 25 July 2021.
