= 2021–22 MFK Tatran Liptovský Mikuláš season =

Slovak football club season

Tatran Liptovský Mikuláš
2021–22 season
- President: Milan Mikušiak
- Manager: Marek Petruš
- Stadium: NTC Poprad (Note: Tatran Liptovský Mikuláš played their home matches at NTC Poprad in Poprad, 60 km away from their home city, instead of their regular stadium, Stadium Liptovský Mikuláš in Liptovský Mikuláš.) (Temporary stadium)
- Slovak First Football League: 8th
- Slovak Cup: Third round
- Top goalscorer: League: Dragan Andrić (7); All: Dragan Andrić (8)
- Biggest win: 5–0 v Tatran Krásno nad Kysucou (Away, 25 August 2021, Slovak Cup)
- Biggest defeat: 0–4 v Spartak Trnava (Away, 9 August 2021, Slovak First Football League); 0–4 v Slovan Bratislava (Away, 24 October 2021, Slovak First Football League)

The 2021–22 season was Mestský Futbalový klub Tatran Liptovský Mikuláš's first ever season in the Slovak top flight after winning the second division in the previous season. In addition to the domestic league, Tatran Liptovský Mikuláš participated in the Slovak Cup.

== Squad ==
Squad at end of season

Note: Flags indicate national team as defined under FIFA eligibility rules; some limited exceptions apply. Players may hold more than one non-FIFA nationality.

No.	Pos.	Nation	Player
1	GK	SVK	Matúš Mikušiak
7	MF	SVK	Adrián Káčerík
8	MF	SVK	Tomáš Gerát
9	MF	SVK	Rastislav Václavik
10	MF	SVK	Richard Bartoš (captain)
11	MF	SVK	Tomáš Staš
13	MF	SVK	Jakub Švec
14	MF	SVK	Tobiáš Diviš
15	DF	SVK	Ivan Kotora
16	MF	SVK	Lukáš Bielák
17	FW	SVK	Peter Voško
18	DF	CZE	Martin Šindelář (on loan from Karviná)

No.	Pos.	Nation	Player
19	MF	SVK	Ľuboslav Laura
20	MF	SVK	Patrik Pinte
21	FW	SVK	Adam Matoš
22	FW	SRB	Dragan Andrić
23	DF	SVK	Adam Krčík
25	DF	SVK	Richard Nagy (on loan from Žilina)
26	DF	SVK	František Pavúk
27	DF	SVK	Kristián Flak
28	DF	SVK	Dávid Filinský
29	GK	CZE	Dominik Sváček
30	GK	CZE	Matěj Luksch

== Transfers ==
=== Summer ===
In: Note: Flags indicate national team as defined under FIFA eligibility rules; some limited exceptions apply. Players may hold more than one non-FIFA nationality.

No.	Pos.	Nation	Player
—	GK	CZE	Dominik Sváček (on loan from (Czech Republic) Plzeň)
—	GK	CZE	Matěj Luksch (from (Czech Republic) České Budějovice)
—	DF	CZE	Robin Hranáč (on loan from (Czech Republic) Plzeň B)
—	DF	SVK	Dávid Filinský (from Ružomberok)
—	FW	SVK	Jakub Švec (on loan from Dunajská Streda)
—	DF	SVK	Kristián Flak (on loan from (Czech Republic) Sparta Prague B)
—	FW	SVK	Adrián Káčerík (from FK Železiarne Podbrezová)

Out: Note: Flags indicate national team as defined under FIFA eligibility rules; some limited exceptions apply. Players may hold more than one non-FIFA nationality.

No.	Pos.	Nation	Player
—	GK	SVK	Patrik Gábriš (to FK Podkonice)
—	DF	SVK	Ivan Lišivka (on loan to ŠK Závažná Poruba)
—	DF	SVK	Daniel Kováč (on loan to ŠK Závažná Poruba)
—	DF	SVK	Ladislav Porubän (on loan to TJ Družstevník Liptovská Štiavnica)
—	DF	SVK	Alex Holub (loan return to MFK Ružomberok)
—	GK	SVK	Jakub Slaniniak (loan return to TJ Sklotatran Poltár and joined MŠK Rimavská Sobota)
—	MF	KOR	Chan-soo Kim (Released)

=== Winter ===
In: Note: Flags indicate national team as defined under FIFA eligibility rules; some limited exceptions apply. Players may hold more than one non-FIFA nationality.

No.	Pos.	Nation	Player
TBA	DF	SVK	František Pavúk (on loan from (Slovakia) Košice)
TBA	DF	SVK	Richard Nagy (on loan from (Slovakia) Žilina B)
TBA	FW	SVK	Adam Matoš (from (Slovakia) Slovan Bratislava B)
TBA	DF	SVK	Lukáš Bielák (on loan from (Poland) Podhale Nowy Targ)
—	DF	CZE	Martin Šindelář (on loan from (Czech Republic) MFK Karviná)

Out: Note: Flags indicate national team as defined under FIFA eligibility rules; some limited exceptions apply. Players may hold more than one non-FIFA nationality.

No.	Pos.	Nation	Player
4	DF	CZE	Robin Hranáč (loan return to (Czech Republic) Viktoria Plzeň B)
26	DF	SVK	Michal Pintér (to (Slovakia) Zlaté Moravce)
37	DF	SVK	Dávid Krčík (on loan to (Czech Republic) Vysočina Jihlava)

== Competitions ==
=== Overview ===
Competition	First match	Last match	Starting round	Final position	Record							
Competition	First match	Last match	Starting round	Final position	Pld	W	D	L	GF	GA	GD	Win %
Slovak First Football League	24 July 2022	21 May 2022	Matchday 1	8th	32	11	7	14	42	57	−15	34.38
Slovak First Football League Europa Conference League play-offs	24 May 2022	24 May 2022	Semi-finals	Semi-finals	1	0	0	1	2	4	−2	0.00
Slovak Cup	25 August 2021	6 October 2021	Second round	Third round	2	1	0	1	7	3	+4	50.00
Total					35	12	7	16	51	64	−13	34.29

Source: Competitions

=== Slovak First Football League ===
==== Regular stage ====
===== League table =====
Pos	Team	Pld	W	D	L	GF	GA	GD	Pts	Qualification
7	Senica	22	7	6	9	21	32	−11	27	Qualification for the relegation group
8	Trenčín	22	6	7	9	32	33	−1	25	Qualification for the relegation group
9	Zemplín Michalovce	22	7	2	13	20	31	−11	23	Qualification for the relegation group
10	Tatran Liptovský Mikuláš	22	5	6	11	27	43	−16	21	Qualification for the relegation group
11	Zlaté Moravce	22	4	7	11	22	36	−14	19	Qualification for the relegation group
12	Pohronie	22	2	4	16	19	47	−28	10	Qualification for the relegation group

Source: Niké liga (in Slovak)
Rules for classification: 1) Points; 2) Head-to-head points; 3) Head-to-head goal difference; 4) Head-to-head away goals scored; 5) Play-off.

===== Results summary =====
Overall								Home						Away					
Pld	W	D	L	GF	GA	GD	Pts	W	D	L	GF	GA	GD	W	D	L	GF	GA	GD
22	5	6	11	27	43	−16	21	5	2	4	16	15	+1	0	4	7	11	28	−17

===== Results by round =====
Round	1	2	3	4	5	6	7	8	9	10	11	12	13	14	15	16	17	18	19	20	21	22
Ground	H	A	A	H	A	H	A	H	A	A	H	A	H	H	A	H	A	H	A	H	H	A
Result	L	L	L	W	L	L	L	W	D	L	W	L	W	L	D	L	L	D	D	D	W	D
Position	10	11	12	11	12	12	12	10	10	10	10	10	10	10	10	11	11	11	10	10	10	10
Points	0	0	0	3	3	3	3	6	7	7	10	10	13	13	14	14	14	15	16	17	20	21

A = Away; H = Home; W = Win; D = Draw; L = Loss

===== Matches =====
24 July 2021 1	Tatran Liptovský Mikuláš	1–4	Slovan Bratislava	Poprad
18:00 CEST (UTC+2)	Bartoš (yellow card) 37'; Pinte 68'	Report	Krčík 22' (o.g.); Rabiu (yellow card) 71'; Lichý 72'; Abena 78'; Ratão 90'	Stadium: NTC Poprad; Attendance: 1,000; Referee: Ladislav Prešinský; Assistant referees: Gabriel Ádám, Marek Galo

1 August 2021 2	DAC Dunajská Streda	3–1	Tatran Liptovský Mikuláš	Dunajská Streda
18:00 CEST (UTC+2)	Schäfer 45', (yellow card) 55'; Taiwo 57'; Sharani 90'	Report	Andrić 1'	Stadium: MOL Aréna; Attendance: 3,446; Referee: Martin Dohál; Assistant referees: Tomáš Straka, Pavel Jánošík

9 August 2021 3	Spartak Trnava	4–0	Tatran Liptovský Mikuláš	Trnava
18:04 CEST (UTC+2)	Boateng 34', 55'; Ristovski 45'; Cabral 75'	Report		Stadium: Štadión Antona Malatinského; Attendance: 2,100; Referee: Michal Smolák; Assistant referees: Gabriel Ádám, Dušan Štofik

15 August 2021 4	Tatran Liptovský Mikuláš	2–1	Žilina	Poprad
20:00 CEST (UTC+2)	Staš (yellow card) 38'; Bartoš 68', 75', (yellow card) 90'; Káčerík (yellow card) 84'; Kotora (yellow card) 90'	Report	Myslovič 35' (pen.); Bichakhchyan (yellow card) 81' (yellow-red card) 90'; Anang (yellow card) 84'	Stadium: NTC Poprad; Attendance: 850; Referee: Boris Marhefka; Assistant referees: Daniel Poláček, Martin Vitko

21 August 2021 5	Zemplín Michalovce	2–1	Tatran Liptovský Mikuláš	Michalovce
18:00 CEST (UTC+2)	Kanu 51'; Žofčák 71'; Trusa (yellow card) 79'	Report	Krčík (yellow card) 54'; Pinte (yellow card) 60'; Švec 90'	Stadium: Mestský futbalový štadión Attendance: 1,258; Referee: Ladislav Prešinský; Assistant referees: Matej Zemko, Jakub Košecký

28 August 2021 6	Tatran Liptovský Mikuláš	1–2	Senica	Poprad
18:00 CEST (UTC+2)	Bartoš 14'; Laura (yellow card) 82'	Report	Mashike 45' (pen.); Filinský 78' (o.g.)	Stadium: NTC Poprad; Attendance: 420; Referee: Filip Glova; Assistant referees: Gabriel Ádám, Patrik Kmec

11 September 2021 7	Sereď	2–0	Tatran Liptovský Mikuláš	Trnava (Note: The match was played at Štadión Antona Malatinského in Trnava instead of Sereď regular stadium, Štadión Sereď in Sereď.)
18:00 CEST (UTC+2)	Dias 21', (yellow card) 45'; Haša 41'; Hučko (yellow card) 78'	Report	Krčík (yellow card) 24'	Stadium: Štadión Antona Malatinského; Attendance: 200; Referee: Ivan Kružliak; Assistant referees: Mário Roszbeck, Peter Čajka

18 September 2021 8	Tatran Liptovský Mikuláš	5–1	Pohronie	Poprad
18:00 CEST (UTC+2)	Laura 18', 64'; Andrić 29'; Pintér (yellow card) 53'; Hranáč 75'; Janec (yellow card) 78'; Václavik 90' (pen.)	Report	Lačný 60'; Špiriak (yellow card) 85' (yellow-red card) 90'	Stadium: NTC Poprad; Attendance: 240; Referee: Martin Dohál; Assistant referees: Erik Weiss, Dušan Štofik

25 September 2021 9	ViOn Zlaté Moravce	2–2	Tatran Liptovský Mikuláš	Zlaté Moravce
18:00 CEST (UTC+2)	Mondek 40'; Tóth (yellow card) 48'; Čonka (yellow card) 50'; Švec 53'; Gamboš (yellow card) 83'; Bednár (yellow card) 90'	Report	Staš 56', (yellow card) 57'; Pintér (yellow card) 66'; Voško 85', (yellow card) 90'; Sváček (yellow card) 90'	Stadium: Štadión FC ViOn; Attendance: 657; Referee: Dušan Sedlák; Assistant referees: Tomáš Straka, Simeon Vass

2 October 2021 10	Ružomberok	4–1	Tatran Liptovský Mikuláš	Ružomberok
18:00 CEST (UTC+2)	Kochan 21' (pen.); Maslo 58'; Regáli 62', 65'	Report	Luksch (yellow card) 20'; Hranáč (yellow card) 55'; Laura 86'	Stadium: Štadión pod Čebraťom; Attendance: 1,205; Referee: Peter Kráľovič; Assistant referees: Pavel Jánošík, Peter Čajka

15 October 2021 11	Tatran Liptovský Mikuláš	2–1	Trenčín	Poprad
17:00 CEST (UTC+2)	Bartoš 68'; Václavik (yellow card) 74'; Voško 90'	Report	Pirinen (yellow card) 42'; Azango (yellow card) 82'; Gaži 89'	Stadium: NTC Poprad; Attendance: 215; Referee: Peter Ziemba; Assistant referees: Milan Štrbo, Adam Jekkel

24 October 2021 12	Slovan Bratislava	4–0	Tatran Liptovský Mikuláš	Bratislava
15:00 CEST (UTC+2)	Henty 57', 84'; Rabiu 67'; Dražić 90'	Report	Bartoš (red card) 35'; Václavik (yellow card) 74'	Stadium: Tehelné pole Attendance: 2,734; Referee: Martin Dohál; Assistant referees: Erik Weiss, Andrej Hrmo

30 October 2021 13	Tatran Liptovský Mikuláš	1–0	DAC Dunajská Streda	Poprad
18:00 CEST (UTC+2)	Voško 29'; Laura (yellow card) 79'	Report	Schäfer (yellow card) 90'	Stadium: NTC Poprad; Attendance: 550; Referee: Adam Somoláni; Assistant referees: Daniel Poláček, Patrik Kmec

7 November 2021 14	Tatran Liptovský Mikuláš	0–2	Spartak Trnava	Poprad
17:00 CET (UTC+1)	Václavik (yellow card) 9'; Hranáč (red card) 64'; Krčík (yellow card) 67'	Report	Cabral 3'; Škrtel (yellow card) 67'; Ristovski 70'; Boateng (yellow card) 90'	Stadium: NTC Poprad; Attendance: 100; Referee: Michal Očenáš; Assistant referees: Branislav Hancko, Peter Bednár

20 November 2021 15	Žilina	2–2	Tatran Liptovský Mikuláš	Žilina
15:00 CET (UTC+1)	Bichakhchyan 37'; Minárik 44'; Slebodník (yellow card) 53'; Jánošík (yellow card) 58'; Paur (yellow card) 78'	Report	Krčík (yellow card) 36', (goal) 90'; Janec (yellow card) 78'; Bartoš 81'; Sváček (yellow card) 90'	Stadium: Štadión pod Dubňom; Attendance: 505; Referee: Martin Dohál; Assistant referees: Juraj Halíček, Matej Zemko

27 November 2021 16	Tatran Liptovský Mikuláš	0–1	Zemplín Michalovce	Poprad
15:00 CET (UTC+1)	Janec (yellow card) 88'	Report	Trusa 89'	Stadium: NTC Poprad; Attendance: 0 Referee: Adam Somoláni; Assistant referees: Tomáš Vorel, Mário Roszbeck

4 December 2021 17	Senica	1–0	Tatran Liptovský Mikuláš	Senica
15:00 CET (UTC+1)	Šumbera 67'; Egy (yellow card) 80'; Šimčák (yellow card) 88'	Report	Václavik (yellow card) 73'	Stadium: OMS ARENA Senica; Attendance: 0 Referee: Kristián Micheľ; Assistant referees: Gabriel Ádám, Patrik Kmec

11 December 2021 18	Tatran Liptovský Mikuláš	1–1	Sereď	Poprad
15:00 CET (UTC+1)	Laura 25'; Bartoš (yellow card) 42'; Gerát (yellow card) 77'; Pintér (yellow card) 90'	Report	Krčík 15' (o.g.); Kadlec (yellow card) 45'; Ljubičić (yellow card) 85'; Haša (yellow card) 90'	Stadium: NTC Poprad; Attendance: 0 Referee: Marián Ruc; Assistant referees: Erik Weiss, Pavel Jánošík

18 December 2021 19	Pohronie	2–2	Tatran Liptovský Mikuláš	Žiar nad Hronom
15:00 CET (UTC+1)	Štrba 69'; Luksch 90' (o.g.)	Report	Václavik 38'; Staš 77'; Hranáč (yellow card) 90'	Stadium: Mestský štadión Attendance: 0 Referee: Adam Somoláni; Assistant referees: Branislav Hancko, František Ferenc

12 February 2022 20	Tatran Liptovský Mikuláš	0–0	ViOn Zlaté Moravce	Poprad
15:00 CET (UTC+1)	Flak (yellow card) 51'; Šindelář (yellow card) 57'; Gerát (yellow card) 64'; Nagy (yellow card) 75'	Report	Mondek (yellow card) 7'; Neofytidis (yellow card) 50' (yellow-red card) 68'; Čögley (yellow card) 90'	Stadium: NTC Poprad; Attendance: 320; Referee: Ivan Kružliak; Assistant referees: Gabriel Ádám, Dušan Štofik

19 February 2022 21	Tatran Liptovský Mikuláš	3–2	Ružomberok	Poprad
15:00 CET (UTC+1)	Pavúk (yellow card) 30'; Staš (yellow card) 47', (goal) 66' (pen.), 76' (pen.); Pinte (yellow card) 51'; Bartoš 64', (yellow card) 69'; Sváček (yellow card) 90'	Report	Boďa 4'; Kochan 31' (pen.); Madleňák (yellow card) 65'; Luka (yellow card) 75'; Regáli (yellow card) 88'; Krajčírik (yellow card) 90'	Stadium: NTC Poprad; Attendance: 388; Referee: Martin Dohál; Assistant referees: Mário Roszbeck, Rastislav Kuba

26 February 2022 22	Trenčín	2–2	Tatran Liptovský Mikuláš	Trenčín
17:00 CET (UTC+1)	Azango 5', 63'; Bainović (yellow card) 38'; Slávik (yellow card) 68'	Report	Pinte 41'; Švec 82'	Stadium: Štadión Sihoť; Attendance: 485; Referee: Peter Kráľovič; Assistant referees: Andrej Hrmo, Matej Zemko

==== Relegation group ====
===== League table =====
Pos	Team	Pld	W	D	L	GF	GA	GD	Pts	Qualification or relegation	TRE	TLM	ZMI	SEN	ZLM	POH
7	Trenčín	32	13	9	10	58	43	+15	48	Qualification for the Europa Conference League play-offs	—	5–2	2–2	4–1	4–3	2–0
8	Tatran Liptovský Mikuláš	32	11	7	14	42	57	−15	40	Qualification for the Europa Conference League play-offs	0–3	—	3–1	2–1	2–2	1–0
9	Zemplín Michalovce	32	12	4	16	32	42	−10	40		1–0	1–2	—	1–0	1–0	1–0
10	Senica (R)	32	9	7	16	29	51	−22	34	Relegation (Note: Senica did not obtain a license for the next season and were automatically relegated.)	0–3	0–3	2–1	—	0–0	2–1
11	Zlaté Moravce	32	7	9	16	33	50	−17	30		0–2	0–1	1–1	3–2	—	1–3
12	Pohronie (R)	32	4	6	22	27	59	−32	18	Relegation to the 2. Liga	1–1	1–1	1–2	1–0	0–1	—

Source: Niké liga (in Slovak)
Legend: Blue = home team win; Yellow = draw; Red = away team win.
Rules for classification: 1) Points; 2) Head-to-head points; 3) Head-to-head goal difference; 4) Head-to-head away goals scored; 5) Play-off.
(R) Relegated

===== Results summary =====
Overall								Home						Away					
Pld	W	D	L	GF	GA	GD	Pts	W	D	L	GF	GA	GD	W	D	L	GF	GA	GD
10	6	1	3	14	12	+2	19	3	0	2	5	5	0	3	1	1	9	7	+2

===== Results by round =====
Round	23	24	25	26	27	28	29	30	31	32
Ground	H	A	A	H	H	A	H	A	A	H
Result	W	W	D	L	W	W	W	L	W	L
Position	10	9	10	10	10	8	8	9	8	8
Points	24	27	28	28	31	34	37	37	40	40

A = Away; H = Home; W = Win; D = Draw; L = Loss

===== Matches =====
5 March 2022 23	Tatran Liptovský Mikuláš	2–1	Senica	Poprad
15:00 CET (UTC+1)	Laura 81'; Gerát 89'	Report	Jurdík 68'; Mihál (yellow card) 71'	Stadium: NTC Poprad; Attendance: 220; Referee: Ladislav Prešinský; Assistant referees: Simeon Vass, Juraj Halíček

12 March 2022 24	ViOn Zlaté Moravce	0–1	Tatran Liptovský Mikuláš	Zlaté Moravce
15:00 CET (UTC+1)	Horák (yellow card) 31' (yellow-red card) 40'; Sloboda (yellow card) 90'	Report	Gerát 49', (yellow card) 89'; Káčerík (yellow card) 90'	Stadium: Štadión FC ViOn; Attendance: 735; Referee: Michal Smolák; Assistant referees: Tomáš Straka, Patrik Kmec

19 March 2022 25	Pohronie	1–1	Tatran Liptovský Mikuláš	Žiar nad Hronom
15:00 CET (UTC+1)	Steinhübel 11'; Pajer (yellow card) 45' (yellow-red card) 67'; Blahút (yellow card) 69'; Šimčák (yellow card) 90'	Report	Andrić 44'	Stadium: Mestský štadión Attendance: 317; Referee: Erik Gemzický; Assistant referees: Tomáš Straka, Simeon Vass

2 April 2022 26	Tatran Liptovský Mikuláš	0–3	Trenčín	Poprad
16:00 CEST (UTC+2)	Flak (yellow card) 45'; Nagy (yellow card) 48'	Report	Stojsavljević (yellow card) 18'; Yem (yellow card) 23'; Kadák 39' (pen.), 57'; Kupusović 41'; Azango (yellow card) 79'	Stadium: NTC Poprad; Attendance: 198; Referee: Peter Ziemba; Assistant referees: Patrik Kmec, Mária Súkeníková

8 April 2022 27	Tatran Liptovský Mikuláš	3–1	Zemplín Michalovce	Poprad
17:00 CEST (UTC+2)	Staš 21'; Andrić 31'; Nagy 76'	Report	Ranko 56'; Marcin (yellow card) 64'	Stadium: NTC Poprad; Attendance: 203; Referee: Michal Smolák; Assistant referees: Milan Štrbo, Martin Vitko

16 April 2022 28	Senica	0–3	Tatran Liptovský Mikuláš	Senica
18:00 CEST (UTC+2)		Report	Andrić 32', 60'; Voško 61'	Stadium: OMS ARENA Senica; Attendance: 313; Referee: Peter Kráľovič; Assistant referees: Dušan Štofik, Juraj Halíček

23 April 2022 29	Tatran Liptovský Mikuláš	1–0	Pohronie	Poprad
18:00 CEST (UTC+2)	Flak 61'; Pinte (yellow card) 90'	Report	Mallé (yellow card) 5'; Kapor (yellow card) 14'; Šimčák (yellow card) 30'; Pajer (yellow card) 68'	Stadium: NTC Poprad; Attendance: 390; Referee: Pavel Ochotnický; Assistant referees: Matej Zemko, Peter Čajka

30 April 2022 30	Trenčín	5–2	Tatran Liptovský Mikuláš	Trenčín
18:00 CEST (UTC+2)	Kupusović 34', 40', 57'; Tučný 51'; Soares 75'	Report	Gerát 39'; Švec 77'	Stadium: Štadión Sihoť; Attendance: 475; Referee: Filip Glova; Assistant referees: Dušan Štofik, Mária Súkeníková

13 May 2022 31	Zemplín Michalovce	1–2	Tatran Liptovský Mikuláš	Michalovce
20:00 CEST (UTC+2)	Pavúk 6' (o.g.); Vaško (yellow card) 7'; Volanakis (yellow card) 51'	Report	Andrić 10' (pen.); Švec 27'; Krčík (yellow card) 44'; Pavúk (yellow card) 54'	Stadium: Mestský futbalový štadión Attendance: 403; Referee: Marián Ruc; Assistant referees: Milan Štrbo, Adam Jekkel

21 May 2022 32	Tatran Liptovský Mikuláš	0–2	ViOn Zlaté Moravce	Poprad
17:00 CEST (UTC+2)	Gerát (yellow card) 56'	Report	Horák 25'; Duga (yellow card) 38'; Kyziridis 87'	Stadium: NTC Poprad; Attendance: 487; Referee: Peter Ziemba; Assistant referees: Patrik Kmec, Jakub Košecký

==== Europa Conference League play-offs ====
24 May 2022 Semi-finals	DAC Dunajská Streda	4–2	Tatran Liptovský Mikuláš	Dunajská Streda
19:30 CEST (UTC+2)	Nebyla 8'; Cigaņiks 27'; Balogh (yellow card) 42'; Andzouana 58'; Krstović 64'	Report	Káčerík 67'; Flak 79'	Stadium: MOL Aréna; Attendance: 4,338; Referee: Peter Kráľovič; Assistant referees: Erik Weiss, Tomáš Vorel

=== Slovak Cup ===
25 August 2021 Second round	Tatran Krásno nad Kysucou	0–5	Tatran Liptovský Mikuláš	Krásno nad Kysucou
17:00 CEST (UTC+2)	Švancar (yellow card) 32'; Podolak (yellow card) 81'; Jarabica (yellow card) 89'	Report	Flak 9'; Laura 15'; Janec (yellow card) 28'; Káčerík 36'; Andrić 40'; Koleno 68' (o.g.); Švec (yellow card) 83'	Stadium: Štadión TJ Tatran Krásno nad Kysucou; Attendance: 250; Referee: Tomáš Kolofík; Assistant referees: Michal Sluk, Anton Hrenák

6 October 2021 Third round	Dolný Kubín	3–2	Tatran Liptovský Mikuláš	Dolný Kubín
15:00 CEST (UTC+2)	Bobček 41', 48'; Bača 53'; Otruba (yellow card) 82'; Hojo (yellow card) 90'	Report	Václavik 61'; Bartoš 80'; Janec (yellow card) 87'; Flak (yellow card) 90'	Stadium: Štadión MUDr. Ivana Chodáka; Attendance: 250; Referee: Lukáš Dzivjak; Assistant referees: Milan Štrbo, Rastislav Kuba
