= List of Slovak football transfers summer 2021 =

Notable Slovak football transfers in the summer transfer window 2021 by club. Only transfers of the Fortuna Liga and 2. liga are included.

== Fortuna Liga ==
=== ŠK Slovan Bratislava ===
In: Note: Flags indicate national team as defined under FIFA eligibility rules; some limited exceptions apply. Players may hold more than one non-FIFA nationality.

No.	Pos.	Nation	Player
13	MF	SRB	Dejan Dražić (loan return from (Poland) Zagłębie Lubin)
18	MF	SVK	David Hrnčár (loan return from (Slovakia) Zlaté Moravce)
—	FW	SVN	Žan Medved (loan return from (Poland) Wisła Kraków)
16	MF	BIH	Alen Mustafić (loan return from (Slovakia) Nitra)
—	MF	SVK	Marián Chobot (from (Slovakia) Nitra)
1	GK	SVK	Adrián Chovan (from (Slovakia) Zlaté Moravce)
4	DF	GEO	Guram Kashia (from (Georgia (country)) Locomotive Tbilisi)
20	MF	GEO	Jaba Kankava (from (France) Valenciennes)
11	MF	CZE	Jaromír Zmrhal (from (Italy) Brescia)
—	DF	SVK	Richard Križan (from AS Trenčín)
—	FW	ENG	Andre Green (from (England) Sheffield Wednesday F.C.)
—	DF	SVK	Matúš Vojtko (from MFK Zemplín Michalovce)
—	MF	NGA	Uche Henry Agbo (from (Spain) Deportivo La Coruña)
—	FW	SUI	Adler Da Silva (on loan from FK Pohronie)
—	FW	SVK	Samuel Mráz (on loan from (Italy) Spezia Calcio)

Out: Note: Flags indicate national team as defined under FIFA eligibility rules; some limited exceptions apply. Players may hold more than one non-FIFA nationality.

No.	Pos.	Nation	Player
—	MF	MAR	Moha (released and joined (Saudi Arabia) Al-Hazem F.C.)
—	MF	ESP	Nono (to (Hungary) Honvéd)
—	MF	SVK	Marián Chobot (on loan to (Slovakia) Zlaté Moravce)
—	FW	SVN	Žan Medved (on loan to (Slovenia) Celje)
—	GK	SVK	Dominik Greif (to (Spain) Mallorca)
—	FW	SVN	Alen Ožbolt (on loan to (Israel) Hapoel Haifa F.C.)
—	DF	SVN	Kenan Bajrić (on loan to (Cyprus) Pafos FC)
—	MF	SVK	Erik Daniel (on loan to (Poland) Zagłębie Lubin)
—	FW	BRA	Rafael Ratão (to (France) Toulouse FC)
—	FW	SVK	David Strelec (to (Italy) Spezia)

=== FC DAC 1904 Dunajská Streda ===
In: Note: Flags indicate national team as defined under FIFA eligibility rules; some limited exceptions apply. Players may hold more than one non-FIFA nationality.

No.	Pos.	Nation	Player
72	GK	SVK	Martin Vantruba (from (Czech Republic) Slavia Prague)
—	MF	SVK	Martin Bednár (loan return from MFK Zemplín Michalovce)
—	MF	SVK	Dominik Veselovský (loan return from FC ŠTK 1914 Šamorín)
—	FW	SVK	Martin Rymarenko (loan return from FC ŠTK 1914 Šamorín)
—	FW	GHA	Zuberu Sharani (loan return from MFK Zemplín Michalovce)
—	DF	SVK	Matúš Malý (loan return from FK Senica)
—	MF	SVK	Andrej Fábry (loan return from ŠKF Sereď)
—	DF	LVA	Andrejs Cigaņiks (from Free agent)
5	DF	AUT	Ahmet Muhamedbegovic (from (Austria) SKN St. Pölten)
—	MF	SVK	Milan Dimun (from (Poland) KS Cracovia)
9	FW	HUN	János Hahn (from (Hungary) Paksi FC)
23	MF	BEL	Thibaud Verlinden (from (Netherlands) Fortuna Sittard)
18	FW	HUN	Ákos Szendrei (from (Hungary) Paksi FC)
45	FW	MNE	Nikola Krstović (from (Serbia) Crvena zvezda)
11	FW	CMR	Didier Lamkel Zé (on loan from (Belgium) Royal Antwerp F.C.)

Out: Note: Flags indicate national team as defined under FIFA eligibility rules; some limited exceptions apply. Players may hold more than one non-FIFA nationality.

No.	Pos.	Nation	Player
—	DF	GER	Jannik Müller (to (Germany) Darmstadt 98)
—	DF	GER	Niklas Sommer (to (Germany) Waldhof Mannheim)
—	MF	SVK	Jakub Švec (on loan to Tatran Liptovský Mikuláš)
—	MF	SVK	Roland Černák (to Humenné)
—	MF	PAN	Ricardo Hinds (to (Panama) Costa del Este)
—	GK	SVK	Benjamín Száraz (on loan to Zemplín Michalovce)
—	MF	HUN	Máté Vida (end of contract joined (Hungary) Vasas SC)
—	MF	GER	Sidney Friede (retired)
—	MF	WAL	Isaac Christie-Davies (loan return to (England) Barnsley)
—	MF	SVK	Martin Bednár (to FC ViOn Zlaté Moravce)
—	FW	VEN	Eric Ramírez (to (Ukraine) FC Dynamo Kyiv)
—	FW	CRO	Marko Divković (on loan to (Denmark) Brøndby IF)
—	FW	NGA	Abdulrahman Taiwo (to (Denmark) SønderjyskE Fodbold)

=== FC Spartak Trnava ===
In: Note: Flags indicate national team as defined under FIFA eligibility rules; some limited exceptions apply. Players may hold more than one non-FIFA nationality.

No.	Pos.	Nation	Player
15	MF	SVK	Roman Procházka (from (Poland) Górnik Zabrze)
19	DF	SVK	Matej Čurma (from (Slovakia) Ružomberok)
11	MF	SVK	Alex Iván (from (Slovakia) Sereď)
90	GK	SVK	Denis Chudý (from (Slovakia) Trenčín)
14	FW	GHA	Kelvin Boateng (from (Portugal) FC Porto B)
7	FW	MKD	Milan Ristovski (from (Croatia) Rijeka)
37	DF	SVK	Martin Škrtel (from Free agent)
17	MF	SYR	Ammar Ramadan (on loan from (Hungary) Ferencváros)
70	MF	USA	Zyen Jones (on loan from Ferencváros II)

Out: Note: Flags indicate national team as defined under FIFA eligibility rules; some limited exceptions apply. Players may hold more than one non-FIFA nationality.

No.	Pos.	Nation	Player
2	DF	SVK	Matúš Turňa (end of contract)
14	MF	NGA	Johnson Nsumoh (loan return to (Nigeria) Family Love Football Academy)
19	MF	ESP	Dani Iglesias (loan return to (Croatia) Rijeka)
7	FW	MKD	Milan Ristovski (loan return to (Croatia) Rijeka)
20	DF	GRE	Marios Tsaousis (loan return to (Greece) PAOK)
21	MF	CIV	Yann Michael Yao (to ŠKF Sereď)
17	MF	SVK	Peter Kolesár (on loan to Zlaté Moravce)
6	DF	NGA	Izuchuckwu Anthony (to (Israel) Hapoel Haifa F.C.)

=== MŠK Žilina ===
In: Note: Flags indicate national team as defined under FIFA eligibility rules; some limited exceptions apply. Players may hold more than one non-FIFA nationality.

No.	Pos.	Nation	Player
—	DF	SVK	Kristián Vallo (loan return from (Poland) Wisła Płock)
—	FW	SVK	Lukáš Jánošík (loan return from Free agent)

Out: Note: Flags indicate national team as defined under FIFA eligibility rules; some limited exceptions apply. Players may hold more than one non-FIFA nationality.

No.	Pos.	Nation	Player
—	DF	SVK	Kristián Vallo (to (Poland) Wisła Płock)
—	FW	POL	Dawid Kurminowski (to (Denmark) AGF)
—	MF	SVK	Ján Bernát (on loan to (Belgium) Westerlo)
—	DF	POL	Jakub Kiwior (to (Italy) Spezia)

=== FC ViOn Zlaté Moravce ===
In: Note: Flags indicate national team as defined under FIFA eligibility rules; some limited exceptions apply. Players may hold more than one non-FIFA nationality.

No.	Pos.	Nation	Player
—	MF	SVK	Marián Chobot (on loan from ŠK Slovan Bratislava)
TBA	FW	TUR	Kubilay Yilmaz (from Free agent)
—	GK	SVK	Matúš Kira (from FC Košice)
—	MF	SVK	Martin Gamboš (from FK Senica)
—	MF	SVK	Martin Bednár (from FC DAC 1904 Dunajská Streda)
—	MF	SVK	Karol Mondek (from (Czech Republic) SFC Opava)
—	DF	SVK	Aaron Belmenen (from FC ViOn Zlaté Moravce youth)
—	MF	SVK	Peter Kolesár (on loan from FC Spartak Trnava)
—	FW	GEO	David Mujiri (from (Georgia (country)) FC Shukura Kobuleti)

Out: Note: Flags indicate national team as defined under FIFA eligibility rules; some limited exceptions apply. Players may hold more than one non-FIFA nationality.

No.	Pos.	Nation	Player
—	MF	SVK	David Hrnčár (loan return to Slovan)
—	FW	SVK	Filip Balaj (to (Poland) Cracovia)
—	GK	SVK	Adrián Chovan (from ŠK Slovan Bratislava)
—	MF	MKD	Tomche Grozdanovski (Released and joined (Croatia) NK Dugopolje)
—	DF	SVK	Michal Pintér (Released and joined MFK Tatran Liptovský Mikuláš)
—	MF	SVK	Peter Orávik (to TJ Družstevník Veľké Ludince)

=== AS Trenčín ===
In: Note: Flags indicate national team as defined under FIFA eligibility rules; some limited exceptions apply. Players may hold more than one non-FIFA nationality.

No.	Pos.	Nation	Player
—	DF	SRB	Đorđe Jovičić (on laon from (Portugal) Braga)
—	FW	SVK	Erik Jendrišek (from FC Nitra)
—	DF	SVK	Samuel Kozlovský (from ŠK Slovan Bratislava)
—	GK	CZE	Tomáš Fryšták (from FK Senica)
—	GK	CZE	Matouš Babka (from (Czech Republic) FC Slavoj Vyšehrad)

Out: Note: Flags indicate national team as defined under FIFA eligibility rules; some limited exceptions apply. Players may hold more than one non-FIFA nationality.

No.	Pos.	Nation	Player
—	MF	NED	Aschraf El Mahdioui (Released and joined (Poland) Wisła Kraków)
—	MF	BIH	Hamza Čataković (Released and joined (Bulgaria) PFC CSKA Sofia)
—	GK	SVK	Igor Šemrinec (Released and joined FC Košice)
—	MF	CRO	Ante Roguljić (Released and joined (Romania) Craiova)
—	MF	BEL	Milan Corryn (Released and joined (Poland) Warta Poznań)
—	GK	NED	Menno Bergsen (Released and joined (Slovenia) NK Maribor)
—	DF	NED	Ruben Ligeon (Released and joined (Netherlands) NAC Breda)
—	MF	CRO	Tomislav Knežević (Released and joined (Bosnia and Herzegovina) FK Rudar Prijedor)
33	DF	SVK	Richard Križan (to ŠK Slovan Bratislava)

=== ŠKF Sereď ===
In: Note: Flags indicate national team as defined under FIFA eligibility rules; some limited exceptions apply. Players may hold more than one non-FIFA nationality.

No.	Pos.	Nation	Player
TBA	FW	CZE	Roman Haša (from (Czech Republic) MFK Karviná)
—	MF	CRO	Nikola Gatarić (from (Cyprus) Ermis Aradippou FC)
—	DF	BRA	Roberto Dias Correia Filho (from (Cyprus) Ermis Aradippou FC)
—	FW	CRO	Dominik Radić (from (Czech Republic) SK Sigma Olomouc)
—	DF	SRB	Mihajilo Popović (from KFC Komárno)
—	DF	COL	Haiderson Hurtado (from (Brazil) Paraná Clube)
—	DF	SVK	Matúš Katunský (on loan from FC Košice)
—	MF	CZE	Dominik Kříž (on loan from (Czech Republic) FC Viktoria Plzeň)
—	DF	SVK	Andrej Kadlec (from (Poland) Jagiellonia Białystok)
—	MF	CIV	Yann Michael Yao (from FC Spartak Trnava)
—	MF	CRO	Marin Ljubičić (from FK Senica)
—	GK	SVK	Martin Chudý (from Free agent)

Out: Note: Flags indicate national team as defined under FIFA eligibility rules; some limited exceptions apply. Players may hold more than one non-FIFA nationality.

No.	Pos.	Nation	Player
TBA	MF	SVK	Alex Iván (to FC Spartak Trnava)
TBA	FW	SVK	Miloš Lačný (to FK Pohronie)
—	MF	SVK	Stanislav Danko (Released)
—	DF	SVK	Matúš Kuník (to FC Petržalka)
—	DF	SVK	Martin Slaninka (to MFK Dukla Banská Bystrica)
—	DF	IRN	Iman Salimi (Released)
—	MF	CZE	Nicolas Šumský (to (Czech Republic) SK Vysoké Mýto)

=== MFK Ružomberok ===
In: Note: Flags indicate national team as defined under FIFA eligibility rules; some limited exceptions apply. Players may hold more than one non-FIFA nationality.

No.	Pos.	Nation	Player
—	FW	SVK	Ladislav Almási (loan return from (Russia) FC Akhmat Grozny)
—	MF	SVK	Lukáš Fabiš (from FC Nitra)
—	MF	SVK	Samuel Šefčík (from FC Nitra)
—	DF	SVK	Alexander Selecký (from MFK Ružomberok U19)
—	MF	SVK	Jakub Tancík (on loan from FC Nitra)

Out: Note: Flags indicate national team as defined under FIFA eligibility rules; some limited exceptions apply. Players may hold more than one non-FIFA nationality.

No.	Pos.	Nation	Player
—	DF	SVK	Matej Čurma (to FC Spartak Trnava)
—	DF	SVK	Lukáš Kojnok (to MFK Dukla Banská Bystrica)
—	DF	SVK	Tomáš Filipiak (on loan to Partizán Bardejov)
—	DF	SVK	Dávid Filinský (to MFK Tatran Liptovský Mikuláš)
—	FW	SVK	Ladislav Almási (to (Czech Republic) FC Baník Ostrava)
—	FW	SVK	Rastislav Kružliak (on loan to Partizán Bardejov)

=== FK Pohronie ===
In: Note: Flags indicate national team as defined under FIFA eligibility rules; some limited exceptions apply. Players may hold more than one non-FIFA nationality.

No.	Pos.	Nation	Player
TBA	FW	SVK	Miloš Lačný (from ŠKF Sereď)
—	GK	SVK	Adrián Slančík (from FK Senica)
TBA	DF	SVK	Timotej Záhumenský (from Free agent)
—	FW	SUI	Adler Da Silva (from (Switzerland) FC Stade Nyonnais)
—	MF	SVK	Marián Šmatlák (from FC ViOn Zlaté Moravce)
—	DF	CZE	Adam Pajer (from FK Železiarne Podbrezová)
—	DF	POL	Aleksander Paluszek (on loan from (Poland) Górnik Zabrze)
—	DF	CZE	Pavel Čmovš (on loan from (Cyprus) Nea Salamis Famagusta FC)
—	MF	POL	Daniel Ściślak (on loan from (Poland) Górnik Zabrze)
—	DF	CZE	Daniel Horák (on loan from (Czech Republic) Sparta Prague B)
—	FW	BRA	Raffael (from Free agent)

Out: Note: Flags indicate national team as defined under FIFA eligibility rules; some limited exceptions apply. Players may hold more than one non-FIFA nationality.

No.	Pos.	Nation	Player
—	FW	SUI	Adler Da Silva (loan return to (Switzerland) FC Stade Nyonnais)
—	DF	CZE	Petr Pavlík (to Senica)
14	MF	ENG	James Weir (Released and joined (Hungary) MTK Budapest FC)
75	DF	FRA	Thomas Heurtaux (Released)
1	GK	SVK	Tomáš Jenčo (Released)
7	DF	CZE	Petr Galuška (Released and joined (Czech Republic) FC Baník Ostrava)
11	FW	CZE	Ondřej Chvěja (Released and joined (Czech Republic) FC Vysočina Jihlava)
—	DF	SVK	Richard Župa (Released)
—	MF	FRA	Élie N'Zeyi (Released)
—	MF	GAM	Alieu Fadera (to (Belgium) S.V. Zulte Waregem)
—	FW	SUI	Adler Da Silva (on loan to ŠK Slovan Bratislava)

=== MFK Zemplín Michalovce ===
In: Note: Flags indicate national team as defined under FIFA eligibility rules; some limited exceptions apply. Players may hold more than one non-FIFA nationality.

No.	Pos.	Nation	Player
—	GK	SVK	Benjamín Száraz (on loan from Dunajská Streda)
—	DF	ESP	Alfonso Artabe (from (Spain) Covadonga)
—	DF	SVK	Erik Šuľa (from FC Nitra)
—	DF	SVK	Juraj Kotula (from Free agent)
—	MF	NGA	Wisdom Kanu (from FK Slavoj Trebišov)
—	MF	SVK	Milan Kvocera (from Dukla Banská Bystrica)
—	FW	SVK	Matúš Marcin (from (Poland) Elana Toruń)
—	DF	SVK	Michal Ranko (from MFK Skalica)
—	FW	SVK	Zoran Záhradník (from MFK Zemplín Michalovce youth)
—	GK	UKR	Andriy Kozhukhar (from (Latvia) Valmiera FC)
—	FW	SVK	Sebastián Gembický (on loan from FC Spartak Trnava)
—	FW	NCA	Pablo Gállego (from (Nicaragua) Managua FC)
—	MF	ESP	José Casado (from (Romania) FC Politehnica Timișoara)
—	MF	ESP	Brian Peña (from Free agent)

Out: Note: Flags indicate national team as defined under FIFA eligibility rules; some limited exceptions apply. Players may hold more than one non-FIFA nationality.

No.	Pos.	Nation	Player
—	MF	SVK	Martin Bednár (loan return to FC DAC 1904 Dunajská Streda)
—	DF	ESP	Ian Pino (to (Poland) Zagłębie Lubin)
—	MF	FRA	Cheikh-Alan Diarra (Released)
—	FW	BIH	Ismar Tandir (Released)
—	GK	CRO	Matej Marković (Released)
—	DF	GRE	Dimitris Siopis (Released)
—	MF	SVK	Roman Begala (to FK Slavoj Trebišov)
—	FW	GHA	Zuberu Sharani (loan return to FC DAC 1904 Dunajská Streda)
—	MF	CYP	Danilo Špoljarić (loan return to (Cyprus) Apollon Limassol)
—	DF	SVK	Matúš Vojtko (to ŠK Slovan Bratislava)

=== FK Senica ===
In: Note: Flags indicate national team as defined under FIFA eligibility rules; some limited exceptions apply. Players may hold more than one non-FIFA nationality.

No.	Pos.	Nation	Player
—	DF	CZE	Petr Pavlík (from Pohronie)
—	MF	CZE	Šimon Šumbera (from (Czech Republic) FC Zbrojovka Brno)
—	DF	CZE	David Gáč (on loan from (Czech Republic) FK Fotbal Třinec)
—	DF	CZE	Václav Svoboda (from (Czech Republic) Viktoria Plzeň B)
—	GK	SVK	Henrich Ravas (from (England) Derby County F.C.)
—	MF	USA	Chris Goslin (from Free agent)
—	MF	SVK	Gabriel Halabrín (from FK Senica U19)
—	FW	CZE	Pavel Hezoučký (from (Czech Republic) FC Slavoj Vyšehrad)
—	MF	CAN	Kris Twardek (from (Poland) Jagiellonia Białystok)
—	MF	CZE	Tomáš Egert (from (Czech Republic) FC Slavoj Vyšehrad)
—	FW	COD	Elvis Mashike Sukisa (from (Czech Republic) FC Slovan Liberec)
—	FW	IDN	Egy Maulana Vikri (from Free agent)
—	MF	SVK	Filip Oršula (from (Georgia (country)) Dinamo Tbilisi)
—	FW	SVK	Milan Jurdík (from (Malta) Valletta)
—	FW	SVK	Matúš Repa (from (Italy) Atalanta U19)

Out: Note: Flags indicate national team as defined under FIFA eligibility rules; some limited exceptions apply. Players may hold more than one non-FIFA nationality.

No.	Pos.	Nation	Player
—	MF	GHA	Edmund Addo (to (Moldova) FC Sheriff Tiraspol)
—	MF	SVK	Martin Gamboš (to FC ViOn Zlaté Moravce)
—	MF	CRO	Marin Ljubičić (Released and joined ŠKF Sereď)
—	FW	SVK	Tomáš Malec (to (Poland) GKS Tychy)
—	DF	ESP	José Carrillo (Released)
—	DF	SVK	Jakub Nemec (loan return to FC Petržalka)
—	MF	SVK	Boris Turčák (loan return to FC Petržalka)
—	GK	SVK	Adrián Slančík (to FK Pohronie)
—	FW	SVK	Dávid Guba (Released and joined FC Košice)
—	MF	SVK	Dávid Gallovič (Released and joined FC Košice)
—	MF	SVK	Marko Totka (Released)
—	GK	CZE	Tomáš Fryšták (Released)
—	FW	SWE	Ardian Berisha (Released)
—	MF	SVK	Martin Košťál (loan return to (Poland) Jagiellonia Białystok)
—	DF	CRO	Antonio Asanović (Released)
—	FW	CZE	Oskar Fotr (Released)
—	DF	CZE	Martin Košťál (loan return to (Czech Republic) SK Dynamo České Budějovice)
—	GK	BEL	Olivier Vliegen (loan return to (Czech Republic) FC Slovan Liberec)
—	DF	SVK	Matúš Malý (loan return to FC DAC 1904 Dunajská Streda)

=== MFK Tatran Liptovský Mikuláš ===
In: Note: Flags indicate national team as defined under FIFA eligibility rules; some limited exceptions apply. Players may hold more than one non-FIFA nationality.

No.	Pos.	Nation	Player
—	GK	CZE	Dominik Sváček (on loan from (Czech Republic) Plzeň)
—	GK	CZE	Matěj Luksch (from (Czech Republic) České Budějovice)
—	DF	CZE	Robin Hranáč (on loan from (Czech Republic) Plzeň B)
—	DF	SVK	Dávid Filinský (from Ružomberok)
—	FW	SVK	Jakub Švec (on loan from Dunajská Streda)
—	DF	SVK	Kristián Flak (on loan from (Czech Republic) Sparta Prague B)
—	FW	SVK	Adrián Káčerík (from FK Železiarne Podbrezová)

Out: Note: Flags indicate national team as defined under FIFA eligibility rules; some limited exceptions apply. Players may hold more than one non-FIFA nationality.

No.	Pos.	Nation	Player
—	GK	SVK	Patrik Gábriš (to FK Podkonice)
—	DF	SVK	Ivan Lišivka (on loan to ŠK Závažná Poruba)
—	DF	SVK	Daniel Kováč (on loan to ŠK Závažná Poruba)
—	DF	SVK	Ladislav Porubän (on loan to TJ Družstevník Liptovská Štiavnica)
—	DF	SVK	Alex Holub (loan return to MFK Ružomberok)
—	GK	SVK	Jakub Slaniniak (loan return to TJ Sklotatran Poltár and joined MŠK Rimavská Sobota)
—	MF	KOR	Chan-soo Kim (Released)

== 2. liga ==
=== MFK Dukla Banská Bystrica ===
In: Note: Flags indicate national team as defined under FIFA eligibility rules; some limited exceptions apply. Players may hold more than one non-FIFA nationality.

No.	Pos.	Nation	Player
—	GK	SVK	Michal Trnovský (loan return from FC Nitra)
—	MF	SVK	Branislav Ľupták (from (Romania) FC Buzău)
—	DF	SVK	Lukáš Kojnok (from MFK Ružomberok)
—	DF	SVK	Marián Pišoja (from MŠK Púchov)
—	FW	SVK	Jakub Šulc (from MFK Skalica)
—	MF	SVK	Sven Jurčišin (on loan from FK Poprad)
—	FW	SVK	David Depetris (from (Italy) U.S. Savoia 1908)

Out: Note: Flags indicate national team as defined under FIFA eligibility rules; some limited exceptions apply. Players may hold more than one non-FIFA nationality.

No.	Pos.	Nation	Player
—	GK	SVK	Adam Krejčí (End of professional career)
—	DF	SVK	Ján Nosko (End of professional career)
—	DF	SVK	Gabriel Snitka (End of professional career)
—	FW	SVK	Lukáš Laksík (End of professional career)
—	GK	SVK	Michal Trnovský (to FC ŠTK 1914 Šamorín)
—	FW	MNE	Miladin Vujošević (Released)
—	MF	SVK	Milan Kvocera (to MFK Zemplín Michalovce)
—	DF	SVK	Kristián Lukáčik (Released)
—	MF	SVK	Marek Frimmel (to FC Rohožník)
—	FW	SVK	Jozef Dolný (to 1. FC Tatran Prešov)
—	MF	SVK	Norbert Brodziansky (on loan to MŠK Námestovo)

=== MFK Skalica ===
In: Note: Flags indicate national team as defined under FIFA eligibility rules; some limited exceptions apply. Players may hold more than one non-FIFA nationality.

No.	Pos.	Nation	Player
—	MF	SVK	Tomáš Brigant (from Partizán Bardejov)
—	FW	CZE	Patrik Voleský (from (Czech Republic) Sigma Olomouc B)
—	DF	CZE	Ondrej Rudzan (from (Czech Republic) Mladá Boleslav B)
—	DF	SVK	Martin Černek (from TJ Družstevník Radimov)
—	MF	SVK	Tomáš Hambálek (from FC Nitra)
—	MF	CZE	Martin Petr (on loan from (Czech Republic) Viktoria Plzeň B)
—	GK	CZE	Denis Gröger (from (Czech Republic) SK Sigma Olomouc)
—	MF	CZE	Jakub Kousal (on loan from (Czech Republic) SK Dynamo České Budějovice)

Out: Note: Flags indicate national team as defined under FIFA eligibility rules; some limited exceptions apply. Players may hold more than one non-FIFA nationality.

No.	Pos.	Nation	Player
—	DF	SVK	Michal Ranko (to MFK Zemplín Michalovce)
—	FW	SVK	Jakub Šulc (to MFK Dukla Banská Bystrica)
—	FW	SVN	Rok Mohorko (to FC Rohožník)
—	MF	SVK	Michal Horodník (to KFC Komárno)
—	FW	POL	Piotr Strączek (to TBA)
—	FW	SVK	Jakub Škovran (loan return to FC Košice)
—	MF	SVK	Andrej Šebesta (to TJ Družstevník Radimov)
—	FW	SVN	Rob Rudonja (Released)
—	MF	CZE	Martin Nečas (loan return to (Czech Republic) FC Zlín)

=== FK Železiarne Podbrezová ===
In: Note: Flags indicate national team as defined under FIFA eligibility rules; some limited exceptions apply. Players may hold more than one non-FIFA nationality.

No.	Pos.	Nation	Player
—	DF	SVK	Vladimír Barbora (from MŠK Žilina B)
—	DF	SVK	Matej Oravec (on loan from (United States) Philadelphia Union)
—	MF	MKD	Martin Talakov (from (North Macedonia) Akademija Pandev)
—	FW	GEO	Davit Natchkebia (from (Georgia (country)) FC Norchi Dinamo Tbilisi)
—	FW	RUS	Ivan Timoshenko (from (Russia) FC Chernomorets Novorossiysk)
—	MF	NGA	Issa Adekunle (from AS Trenčín)

Out: Note: Flags indicate national team as defined under FIFA eligibility rules; some limited exceptions apply. Players may hold more than one non-FIFA nationality.

No.	Pos.	Nation	Player
—	FW	SVK	Adrián Káčerík (to MFK Tatran Liptovský Mikuláš)
—	DF	SVK	Peter Rokyta (on loan to FK Slavoj Trebišov)
—	MF	SVK	Samuel Šuľak (to FK Humenné)
—	FW	SVK	Roland Gerebenits (loan return to MŠK Žilina B)
—	DF	SVK	Juraj Chvátal (loan return to (Czech Republic) SK Sigma Olomouc)
—	MF	SVK	Martin Pribula (Released)
—	FW	POL	Daniel Skiba (Released)
—	DF	CZE	Adam Pajer (to FK Pohronie)
—	FW	SVK	Erik Micovčák (Released)

=== FC Košice ===
In: Note: Flags indicate national team as defined under FIFA eligibility rules; some limited exceptions apply. Players may hold more than one non-FIFA nationality.

No.	Pos.	Nation	Player
—	DF	SVK	Matúš Katunský (loan return from FK Slavoj Trebišov)
—	FW	SVK	Dávid Guba (from FK Senica)
—	MF	SVK	Dávid Gallovič (from FK Senica)
—	GK	SVK	Igor Šemrinec (from AS Trenčín)
—	GK	SVK	Frederik Valach (from FC Petržalka)
—	MF	COL	José Ricardo Cortés (from (Hungary) Diósgyőri VTK)
—	FW	DEN	Marcus Mølvadgaard (from (Norway) Strømsgodset Toppfotball)
—	DF	COL	Dairyn González (from (Colombia) Unión Magdalena)
—	MF	ESP	Pedrito (from (Czech Republic) FC Fastav Zlín)

Out: Note: Flags indicate national team as defined under FIFA eligibility rules; some limited exceptions apply. Players may hold more than one non-FIFA nationality.

No.	Pos.	Nation	Player
—	GK	SVK	Matúš Kira (to FC ViOn Zlaté Moravce)
—	GK	UKR	Tymofii Sheremeta (Released)
—	MF	SRB	Nikola Ristovski (to (Serbia) OFK Bačka)
—	MF	SRB	Nikola Krčmarević (Released)
—	FW	SVK	Patrik Košuda (loan return to FK Pohronie)
—	FW	SRB	Nikola Komazec (Released)
—	DF	SVK	Samuel Kuc (Released)
—	MF	SVK	Christián Veliký (to Baník Ostrava B)
—	FW	SVK	Ján Lesniak (Released)
—	DF	GRE	Christos Kountouriotis (Released)
—	MF	SVK	Dávid Keresteš (to Partizán Bardejov)
—	GK	SVK	Matej Hudák (Released)
—	DF	SVK	Matúš Katunský (on loan to ŠKF Sereď)

=== FC ŠTK 1914 Šamorín ===
In: Note: Flags indicate national team as defined under FIFA eligibility rules; some limited exceptions apply. Players may hold more than one non-FIFA nationality.

No.	Pos.	Nation	Player
—	GK	SVK	Martin Danihel (from FC ŠTK 1914 Šamorín U19)
—	GK	SVK	Michal Trnovský (from MFK Dukla Banská Bystrica)
—	DF	GUI	Franck Bahi (from Gent U21)
—	MF	SVK	Ondrej Vrábel (from FC Nitra)
—	GK	HUN	Erik Gyurákovics (from (Hungary) Győri ETO FC)
—	MF	SVK	Juraj Štefanka (on loan from PFK Piešťany)

Out: Note: Flags indicate national team as defined under FIFA eligibility rules; some limited exceptions apply. Players may hold more than one non-FIFA nationality.

No.	Pos.	Nation	Player
—	FW	SVK	Jakub Švec (loan return to FC DAC 1904 Dunajská Streda)
—	FW	HUN	Zoárd Nagy (Released)
—	DF	HUN	Ádám Böndi (Released)
—	MF	SVK	Dominik Veselovský (loan return to FC DAC 1904 Dunajská Streda)
—	FW	SVK	Martin Rymarenko (loan return to FC DAC 1904 Dunajská Streda)
—	GK	SVK	Jakub Bubák (to ŠK 1923 Gabčíkovo)
—	DF	SVK	Jakab Molnár (on loan to ŠK 1923 Gabčíkovo)
—	DF	SVK	Ľubomír Mezovský (Retired)

=== MŠK Púchov ===
In: Note: Flags indicate national team as defined under FIFA eligibility rules; some limited exceptions apply. Players may hold more than one non-FIFA nationality.

No.	Pos.	Nation	Player
—	MF	CZE	Ondřej Ullman (on loan from (Czech Republic) FK Dukla Prague)
—	DF	SVK	Matej Loduha (from ŠKF Sereď)
—	MF	SVK	Adrián Kopičár (from (Czech Republic) FK Blansko)

Out: Note: Flags indicate national team as defined under FIFA eligibility rules; some limited exceptions apply. Players may hold more than one non-FIFA nationality.

No.	Pos.	Nation	Player
—	DF	SVK	Marián Pišoja (to MFK Dukla Banská Bystrica)
—	MF	SVK	Péter Varga (to KFC Komárno)
—	MF	SVK	Patrik Krčula (loan return to FK Železiarne Podbrezová)
—	DF	SVK	Michal Riška (End of career)
—	MF	SVK	Jakub Michlík (loan return to MŠK Žilina B)
—	FW	SVK	Peter Rypák (Released)

=== KFC Komárno ===
In: Note: Flags indicate national team as defined under FIFA eligibility rules; some limited exceptions apply. Players may hold more than one non-FIFA nationality.

No.	Pos.	Nation	Player
—	MF	SVK	Šimon Šmehýl (from (Czech Republic) 1. SK Prostějov)
—	DF	SVK	Samuel Orság (from FK Slavoj Trebišov)
—	MF	SVK	Péter Varga (from MŠK Púchov)
—	MF	SVK	Michal Horodník (from MFK Skalica)
—	DF	SVK	Patrik Rumanský (from FK Poprad)
—	MF	SVK	Michal Petráš (from AS Trenčín)
—	MF	SVK	Tamás Németh (from (Hungary) Kazincbarcikai SC)
—	MF	MNG	Ganbayar Ganbold (on loan from (Hungary) Puskás Akadémia FC)
—	MF	HUN	Arthur Györgyi (from (Hungary) Nyíregyháza Spartacus FC)

Out: Note: Flags indicate national team as defined under FIFA eligibility rules; some limited exceptions apply. Players may hold more than one non-FIFA nationality.

No.	Pos.	Nation	Player
—	DF	SRB	Mihajilo Popović (to ŠKF Sereď)
—	FW	SVK	Tomáš Faragó (to TBA)
—	FW	NIG	Issa Modibo Sidibé (Released)
—	MF	SVK	Jakub Krela (on loan to Partizán Bardejov)
—	MF	SVK	Marek Rigo (to (Austria) SC Wiener Viktoria)
—	DF	SVK	Marek Pittner (to FC Rohožník)

=== FC Petržalka ===
In: Note: Flags indicate national team as defined under FIFA eligibility rules; some limited exceptions apply. Players may hold more than one non-FIFA nationality.

No.	Pos.	Nation	Player
—	DF	SVK	Kristián Kolčák (loan return from FC Nitra)
—	GK	SVK	Filip Krížik (loan return from Slovan Bratislava B)
—	MF	SVK	Tomáš Nagy (loan return from FK Poprad)
—	DF	SVK	Jakub Nemec (loan return from FK Senica)
—	MF	SVK	Boris Turčák (loan return from FK Senica)
—	FW	SVK	Marko Kelemen (from (Hungary) Kazincbarcikai SC)
—		SVK	Matej Riznič (from ŠK Slovan Bratislava)
—	DF	SVK	Matúš Kuník (from ŠKF Sereď)
—	FW	BIH	Haris Harba (from (Albania) KF Bylis)
—	MF	SVK	Šimon Štefanec (from MŠK Púchov)
—	MF	SVK	Branislav Spáčil (from FC Nitra)
—	MF	SVK	Patrik Danek (from FC Nitra)
—	DF	SVK	Patrik Rédeky (from FC Nitra)
—	DF	SVK	Simeon Kohút (on loan from AS Trenčín)
—	DF	SVK	Oliver Slivka (from FK Poprad)

Out: Note: Flags indicate national team as defined under FIFA eligibility rules; some limited exceptions apply. Players may hold more than one non-FIFA nationality.

No.	Pos.	Nation	Player
—	GK	SVK	Frederik Valach (to FC Košice)
—	DF	SVK	Martin Huba (loan return to MFK Ružomberok)
—	MF	SVK	Viktor Jedinák (loan return to MFK Ružomberok)
—	MF	SVK	Jakub Kudlička (loan return to MFK Ružomberok)
—	MF	SVK	Michal Dopater (loan return to MFK Ružomberok)
—	DF	SVK	Tomáš Filipiak (loan return to MFK Ružomberok)
—	FW	SVK	Viktor Vondryska (loan return to FK Pohronie)
—	MF	SVK	Alexander Horváth (loan return to FC Spartak Trnava)
—	DF	SVK	Samuel Kozlovský (loan return to Slovan Bratislava B)
—	DF	UKR	Dmytro Petryk (Released)
—	DF	SVK	Pavol Farkaš (loan return to FC Nitra)
—	DF	SVK	Kristián Kolčák (to (Austria) SV Stripfing)
—	DF	SVK	Denis Horník (loan return to FC Spartak Trnava)
—	MF	SVK	Andrej Habovčík (on loan to MFK Rusovce)
—	FW	SVK	Sebastián Gembický (loan return to FC Spartak Trnava)
—	MF	ESP	Oscar Castellano (Released)

=== FK Slavoj Trebišov ===
In: Note: Flags indicate national team as defined under FIFA eligibility rules; some limited exceptions apply. Players may hold more than one non-FIFA nationality.

No.	Pos.	Nation	Player
—	MF	SVK	Roman Begala (from MFK Zemplín Michalovce)
—	DF	SVK	Lukáš Šimko (from 1. FC Tatran Prešov)
—	DF	SVK	Peter Rokyta (on loan from FK Železiarne Podbrezová)
—	MF	SVK	Jakub Verčimák (from MFK Vranov nad Topľou)
—	FW	POL	Piotr Strączek (on loan from MFK Skalica)
—	MF	SVK	Samuel Kuba (on loan from FK Poprad)
—	FW	SVK	Peter Rypák (from MŠK Púchov)
—	MF	SVK	Patrik Košuda (on loan from FK Pohronie)
—	MF	SVK	Stanislav Danko (on loan from ŠKF Sereď)
—	DF	SVK	Sebastián Jurčišin (on loan from FK Poprad)
—	FW	SVK	Peter Belko (on loan from PŠC Pezinok)

Out: Note: Flags indicate national team as defined under FIFA eligibility rules; some limited exceptions apply. Players may hold more than one non-FIFA nationality.

No.	Pos.	Nation	Player
—	MF	NGA	Wisdom Kanu (to MFK Zemplín Michalovce)
—	MF	NGA	Issa Adekunle (loan return to AS Trenčín and joined FK Železiarne Podbrezová)
—	DF	SVK	Matúš Katunský (loan return to FC Košice)
—	DF	SVK	Samuel Orság (to KFC Komárno)
—	GK	SVK	Milan Vinclér (to MFK Stará Ľubovňa)
—	MF	SVK	Martin Polaščík (loan return to FK Humenné and joined MŠK Tesla Stropkov)
—	FW	SVK	Jakub Bavoľár (to TBD)
—	MF	SVK	Roman Kovalčík (to TBD)
—	FW	SVK	Michal Vilkovský (to FC Lokomotíva Košice)

=== FK Dubnica ===
In: Note: Flags indicate national team as defined under FIFA eligibility rules; some limited exceptions apply. Players may hold more than one non-FIFA nationality.

No.	Pos.	Nation	Player
—	DF	SVK	Peter Bryndziar (on loan from MFK Bytča)

Out: Note: Flags indicate national team as defined under FIFA eligibility rules; some limited exceptions apply. Players may hold more than one non-FIFA nationality.

No.	Pos.	Nation	Player
—	MF	SVK	Aurel Dávidík (loan return to FK Železiarne Podbrezová and joined MŠK Považská Bystrica)
—	DF	SVK	Jakub Párkaň (loan return to AS Trenčín)
—	DF	SVK	Timotej Janček (Released)

=== MŠK Žilina B ===
In: Note: Flags indicate national team as defined under FIFA eligibility rules; some limited exceptions apply. Players may hold more than one non-FIFA nationality.

No.	Pos.	Nation	Player
—	FW	SVK	Roland Gerebenits (loan return from FK Železiarne Podbrezová)
—	DF	GHA	Richmond Owusu (from (Ghana) MŠK Žilina Africa FC)
—	DF	GHA	Aremeyaw Abasa (from (Ghana) MŠK Žilina Africa FC)

Out: Note: Flags indicate national team as defined under FIFA eligibility rules; some limited exceptions apply. Players may hold more than one non-FIFA nationality.

No.	Pos.	Nation	Player
—	DF	SVK	Vladimír Barbora (to FK Železiarne Podbrezová)

=== Partizán Bardejov ===
In: Note: Flags indicate national team as defined under FIFA eligibility rules; some limited exceptions apply. Players may hold more than one non-FIFA nationality.

No.	Pos.	Nation	Player
—	DF	SVK	Tomáš Filipiak (on loan from MFK Ružomberok)
—	MF	SVK	Roman Zemko (from Free agent)
—	MF	SVK	Dávid Keresteš (from FC Košice)
—	FW	BIH	Kojo Matić (from Free agent)
—	GK	SVK	Alex Fojtíček (from (England) Blackpool F.C.)
—	FW	SVK	Rastislav Kružliak (on loan from MFK Ružomberok)
—	DF	SRB	Stefan Veličković (from (Serbia) FK Čukarički)
—	MF	NGA	Salisu Abdullahi (from (Denmark) Fremad Amager)
—	DF	SVK	Richard Župa (from FK Pohronie)
—	MF	NGA	Anthony Ikedi (from (Norway) Øygarden FK)

Out: Note: Flags indicate national team as defined under FIFA eligibility rules; some limited exceptions apply. Players may hold more than one non-FIFA nationality.

No.	Pos.	Nation	Player
—	MF	SVK	Tomáš Brigant (to MFK Skalica)
—	GK	SVK	Dušan Dlugoš (on loan to MŠK Tesla Stropkov)

=== ŠK Slovan Bratislava B ===
In: Note: Flags indicate national team as defined under FIFA eligibility rules; some limited exceptions apply. Players may hold more than one non-FIFA nationality.

No.	Pos.	Nation	Player
—	MF	RUS	Kirill Nikitin (from (Russia) FC Kuban-Holding Pavlovskaya)

Out: Note: Flags indicate national team as defined under FIFA eligibility rules; some limited exceptions apply. Players may hold more than one non-FIFA nationality.

No.	Pos.	Nation	Player

=== FK Humenné ===
In: Note: Flags indicate national team as defined under FIFA eligibility rules; some limited exceptions apply. Players may hold more than one non-FIFA nationality.

No.	Pos.	Nation	Player
—	DF	SVK	Juraj Kuc (from FK Poprad)
—	MF	SVK	Samuel Šuľak (from FK Železiarne Podbrezová)
—	MF	SVK	Viktor Maťaš (from Partizán Bardejov)
—	DF	SVK	Ján Dzúrik (from Partizán Bardejov)
—	MF	SVK	Kevin Komár (from FC Košice)
—	MF	SVK	Jozef-Šimon Turík (from FC Košice)

Out: Note: Flags indicate national team as defined under FIFA eligibility rules; some limited exceptions apply. Players may hold more than one non-FIFA nationality.

No.	Pos.	Nation	Player
—	MF	SVK	Jozef Skvašík (to MFK Snina)
—	FW	SVK	Šimon Ganaj (Released)
—		SVK	Šimon Vaceľ (loan return to MFK Zemplín Michalovce U19)
—		SVK	Štefan Zavacký (to TBA)

=== FC Rohožník ===
In: Note: Flags indicate national team as defined under FIFA eligibility rules; some limited exceptions apply. Players may hold more than one non-FIFA nationality.

No.	Pos.	Nation	Player
—	GK	SVK	Dominik Kolena (from FK Dubnica)
—	FW	SVK	Jozef Herman (from Slovan Bratislava B)
—	FW	SVN	Rok Mohorko (from MFK Skalica)
—	DF	SVK	Marek Pittner (from KFC Komárno)
—	DF	SVK	Marek Privrel (from (Austria) SC Apetlon)
—	MF	SVK	Marek Frimmel (from MFK Dukla Banská Bystrica)
—	MF	SVK	Sebastián Prášek (on loan from FC DAC 1904 Dunajská Streda)

Out: Note: Flags indicate national team as defined under FIFA eligibility rules; some limited exceptions apply. Players may hold more than one non-FIFA nationality.

No.	Pos.	Nation	Player
—	MF	SVK	Vladimír Ronec (Released)
—		SVK	Tomáš Morávek (Released)
—	DF	SVK	Filip Kalanka (Released)
—	DF	SVK	Marek Zajíc (Released)
—	MF	SVK	Adam Ščibrány (Released)
—	MF	SVK	Filip Turlík (Released)
—	GK	SVK	Marek Adamovič (Released)

=== MŠK Námestovo ===
In: Note: Flags indicate national team as defined under FIFA eligibility rules; some limited exceptions apply. Players may hold more than one non-FIFA nationality.

No.	Pos.	Nation	Player
—	MF	POL	Wojciech Kobylarczyk (from (Poland) NKP Podhale Nowy Targ)
—	MF	SVK	Norbert Brodziansky (on loan from MFK Dukla Banská Bystrica)

Out: Note: Flags indicate national team as defined under FIFA eligibility rules; some limited exceptions apply. Players may hold more than one non-FIFA nationality.

No.	Pos.	Nation	Player
