= 2021–22 Slovak First Football League =

Football league in Slovakia

Fortuna Liga
- Season: 2021–22
- Dates: Regular season: 23 July 2021 – 21 May 2022; Europa Conference League play-offs: 24 – 27 May 2022
- Champions: Slovan Bratislava
- Champions League: Slovan Bratislava
- Europa Conference League: Spartak Trnava; Ružomberok; DAC Dunajská Streda
- Matches: 192
- Goals: 502 (2.61 per match)
- Top goalscorer: Jakub Kadák (13 goals)
- Biggest home win: Slovan Bratislava 5–0 Senica (12 February 2022)
- Biggest away win: Tatran Liptovský Mikuláš 1–4 Slovan Bratislava (24 July 2021); Pohronie 0–3 DAC Dunajská Streda (27 August 2021); Senica 0–3 Slovan Bratislava (25 September 2021); DAC Dunajská Streda 0–3 Spartak Trnava (26 September 2021); Spartak Trnava 0–3 (awd.) Slovan Bratislava (17 October 2021); Spartak Trnava 0–3 Ružomberok (28 November 2021); Zemplín Michalovce 0–3 Ružomberok (4 December 2021); Tatran Liptovský Mikuláš 0–3 Trenčín (2 April 2022); Senica 0–3 Trenčín (14 May 2022); Sereď 0–3 Slovan Bratislava (14 May 2022)
- Highest scoring: Pohronie 3–4 Slovan Bratislava (19 February 2022); Trenčín 4–3 Zlaté Moravce (26 April 2022); Trenčín 5–2 Tatran Liptovský Mikuláš (30 April 2022)
- Longest winning run: 9 matches Slovan Bratislava
- Longest unbeaten run: 20 matches Slovan Bratislava
- Longest winless run: 17 matches Pohronie
- Longest losing run: 5 matches Pohronie; Trenčín
- Highest attendance: 9,000; Spartak Trnava 0–3 (awd.) Slovan Bratislava (17 October 2021)
- Lowest attendance: 0 (Note: Matches were played behind closed doors without any spectators.); All matches from 25 November 2021 to 12 February 2022 due to the COVID-19 pandemic.
- All statistics correct as of 27 May 2022.

The 2021–22 Slovak First Football League was the 29th season of the first-tier football league in Slovakia since its establishment in 1993.

Slovan Bratislava were the defending champions for the third successive year, after picking up the second consecutive domestic double in the previous season. Slovan successfully retained their league title, winning a record-breaking fourth title in a row and a record-extending 12th overall since the competition was established in 1993.

== Teams ==
Twelve teams competed in the league – the top ten teams from the previous season, the relegation play-offs winner, and the one team promoted from the 2. Liga, Tatran Liptovský Mikuláš, who were promoted to the top flight for the first time. Nitra (relegated after four years in the top flight) had been relegated to 3. Liga.

=== Stadiums and locations ===
Location of teams in Fortuna liga 2021–22

FC DAC 1904 Dunajská Streda	FK Pohronie	MFK Ružomberok	FK Senica
MOL Aréna; UEFA	Mestský futbalový štadión UEFA	Štadión pod Čebraťom	OMS Arena; UEFA
Capacity: 12,700	Capacity: 2,309	Capacity: 4,817	Capacity: 5,070
ŠKF Sereď	ŠK Slovan Bratislava	FC Spartak Trnava	MFK Tatran Liptovský Mikuláš
ŠAM - City Arena; UEFA	Tehelné pole UEFA	ŠAM - City Arena; UEFA	NTC Poprad; UEFA
Capacity: 19,200	Capacity: 22,500	Capacity: 19,200	Capacity: 5,700
AS Trenčín	MFK Zemplín Michalovce	FC ViOn Zlaté Moravce	MŠK Žilina
Štadión Sihoť; UEFA	Mestský futbalový štadión UEFA	Štadión FC ViOn; UEFA	Štadión pod Dubňom; UEFA
Capacity: 4,200 (10,000 planned)	Capacity: 4,440	Capacity: 4,006	Capacity: 11,253

=== Personnel and kits ===
Team	President	Manager	Captain	Kit manufacturer	Shirt sponsor
DAC Dunajská Streda	(Slovakia) Oszkár Világi	(Portugal) João Janeiro	(Hungary) Zsolt Kalmár	Macron	Kukkonia
Pohronie	(Slovakia) Igor Rozenberg	(Slovakia) Peter Lérant	(Slovakia) Patrik Blahút	Erreà	REMESLO
Ružomberok	(Slovakia) Milan Fiľo	(Slovakia) Peter Struhár	(Slovakia) Ján Maslo	Adidas	TAURIS
Senica	(Czech Republic) Oldřich Duda	(Slovakia) Libor Fašiang	(Slovakia) Juraj Piroska	Adidas	KOMPLEXX GROUP SK
Sereď	(Slovakia) Róbert Stareček	(Slovakia) Juraj Jarábek	(Slovakia) Ľubomír Michalík	Nike	ORION TIP
Slovan Bratislava	(Slovakia) Ivan Kmotrík	(Slovakia) Vladimír Weiss	(Bulgaria) Vasil Bozhikov	Adidas	Niké
Spartak Trnava	(Slovakia) Peter Macho	(Slovakia) Michal Gašparík	(Slovakia) Martin Mikovič	Adidas	Tipsport
Tatran Liptovský Mikuláš	(Slovakia) Milan Mikušiak	(Slovakia) Marek Petruš	(Slovakia) Richard Bartoš	Sportika	VEREX
Trenčín	(Slovakia) Jozef Liptovský	(Slovakia) Juraj Ančic (interim)	(Slovakia) Jakub Kadák	Macron	Tipsport
Zemplín Michalovce	(Slovakia) Ján Sabol	(Slovakia) Norbert Hrnčár	(Slovakia) Igor Žofčák	Adidas	ISDB, St. Nicolaus
Zlaté Moravce	(Slovakia) Karol Škula	(Slovakia) Ján Kocian	(Slovakia) Tomáš Ďubek	Erreà	ViOn
Žilina	(Slovakia) Jozef Antošík	(Slovakia) Ivan Belák (interim)	(Slovakia) Jakub Paur	Nike	Preto

=== Managerial changes ===
Team	Outgoing manager	Manner of departure	Date of vacancy	Position in table	Replaced by	Date of appointment
Pohronie	(Czech Republic) Jan Kameník	End of contract	21 May 2021	Pre-season	(Slovakia) Gergely Geri	2 June 2021
Ružomberok	(Slovakia) Ján Haspra	End of contract	27 May 2021	Pre-season	(Slovakia) Peter Struhár	30 May 2021
Sereď	(Slovakia) Gergely Geri	Signed with Pohronie	2 June 2021	Pre-season	(Slovakia) Juraj Jarábek	11 June 2021
Trenčín	(Slovakia) Juraj Ančic	End of interim spell	2 June 2021	Pre-season	(Slovakia) Peter Hlinka	2 June 2021
Senica	(Slovakia) Karol Praženica	Released	2 June 2021	Pre-season	(Czech Republic) Pavel Šustr	2 June 2021
Pohronie	(Slovakia) Gergely Geri	Released	29 August 2021	10	(Slovakia) Štefan Zaťko (interim)	30 August 2021
Pohronie	(Slovakia) Štefan Zaťko	End of interim spell	4 October 2021	12	(Spain) Pablo Villar	4 October 2021
Žilina	(Slovakia) Pavol Staňo	Released	4 October 2021	7	(Slovakia) Peter Černák	4 October 2021
DAC Dunajská Streda	(Hungary) Antal Németh	Released	10 November 2021	5	(Portugal) João Janeiro	11 November 2021
Trenčín	(Slovakia) Peter Hlinka	Resigned	5 December 2021	7	(Slovakia) Juraj Ančic	5 December 2021
Pohronie	(Spain) Pablo Villar	Released	21 December 2021	12	(Czech Republic) Martin Bittengl	4 January 2022
Zemplín Michalovce	(Slovakia) Anton Šoltis	Released	15 March 2022	9	(Slovakia) Norbert Hrnčár	15 March 2022
Senica	(Czech Republic) Pavel Šustr	Resigned	16 April 2022	8	(Slovakia) Libor Fašiang	16 April 2022
Pohronie	(Czech Republic) Martin Bittengl	Released	19 April 2021	12	(Slovakia) Peter Lérant	19 April 2022
Žilina	(Slovakia) Peter Černák	Released	23 April 2022	6	(Slovakia) Ivan Belák (interim)	23 April 2022
Zlaté Moravce	(Slovakia) Ľuboš Benkovský	Released	5 May 2022	11	(Slovakia) Ján Kocian	5 May 2022

== Regular stage ==
=== League table ===
Pos	Team	Pld	W	D	L	GF	GA	GD	Pts	Qualification
1	Slovan Bratislava	22	16	5	1	52	16	+36	53	Qualification for the championship group
2	Spartak Trnava	22	13	6	3	29	12	+17	45	Qualification for the championship group
3	Ružomberok	22	11	8	3	39	17	+22	41	Qualification for the championship group
4	DAC Dunajská Streda	22	10	6	6	28	23	+5	36	Qualification for the championship group
5	Sereď	22	9	5	8	28	28	0	32	Qualification for the championship group
6	Žilina	22	8	6	8	34	33	+1	30	Qualification for the championship group
7	Senica	22	7	6	9	21	32	−11	27	Qualification for the relegation group
8	Trenčín	22	6	7	9	32	33	−1	25	Qualification for the relegation group
9	Zemplín Michalovce	22	7	2	13	20	31	−11	23	Qualification for the relegation group
10	Tatran Liptovský Mikuláš	22	5	6	11	27	43	−16	21	Qualification for the relegation group
11	Zlaté Moravce	22	4	7	11	22	36	−14	19	Qualification for the relegation group
12	Pohronie	22	2	4	16	19	47	−28	10	Qualification for the relegation group

Source: Niké liga (in Slovak)
Rules for classification: 1) Points; 2) Head-to-head points; 3) Head-to-head goal difference; 4) Head-to-head away goals scored; 5) Play-off.

=== Results ===
Each team plays home-and-away against every other team in the league, for a total of 22 matches each.

Home \ Away	DAC	POH	RUŽ	SEN	SER	SLO	TRN	TLM	TRE	ZMI	ZLM	ŽIL
DAC Dunajská Streda		2–0	0–0	1–0	1–3	1–1	0–3	3–1	1–1	1–0	4–2	3–1
Pohronie	0–3		2–2	0–1	1–1	3–4	0–2	2–2	2–2	2–0	0–2	1–2
Ružomberok	1–2	1–0		0–0	3–1	1–0	0–0	4–1	3–0	0–0	1–1	5–1
Senica	1–1	1–0	0–2		1–2	0–3	2–1	1–0	1–0	1–1	1–2	2–2
Sereď	1–0	3–1	2–3	2–1		0–1	0–1	2–0	4–2	0–1	2–1	1–1
Slovan Bratislava	0–0	5–1	1–0	5–0	2–0		0–0	4–0	2–0	3–1	4–1	2–2
Spartak Trnava	1–1	2–0	0–3	2–1	2–0	0–3 (Note: The match was suspended after 15 minutes of play due to the riots of the spectators, who entered the pitch. Subsequently, the match was abandoned by the referee. On 20 October, Slovan were awarded a technical 3–0 victory by the Presidium of the Union of League Clubs, which is the governing organization for the Slovak top level football competition.)		4–0	0–0	2–0	2–0	1–1
Tatran Liptovský Mikuláš	1–0	5–1	3–2	1–2	1–1	1–4	0–2		2–1	0–1	0–0	2–1
Trenčín	0–1	3–0	1–1	3–3	0–0	2–3	0–1	2–2		4–2	4–0	1–3
Zemplín Michalovce	4–1	0–2	0–3	0–1	0–1	1–2	1–2	2–1	1–2		2–1	1–0
Zlaté Moravce	2–0	1–0	2–2	1–1	2–2	1–2	0–0	2–2	0–1	0–1		0–1
Žilina	0–2	3–1	0–2	3–0	3–0	1–1	0–1	2–2	1–3	2–1	4–1	

Source: Niké liga (in Slovak)
Legend: Blue = home team win; Yellow = draw; Red = away team win.

== Championship group ==
Pos	Team	Pld	W	D	L	GF	GA	GD	Pts	Qualification	SLO	RUŽ	TRN	DAC	SER	ŽIL
1	Slovan Bratislava (C)	32	22	8	2	71	25	+46	74	Qualification for the Champions League first qualifying round	—	1–1	1–0	3–1	5–1	2–2
2	Ružomberok	32	17	12	3	58	23	+35	63	Qualification for the Europa Conference League first qualifying round	0–0	—	0–0	4–1	3–1	3–0
3	Spartak Trnava	32	17	9	6	36	17	+19	60	Qualification for the Europa Conference League second qualifying round (Note: Spartak Trnava qualified for the Europa Conference League second qualifying round as the 2021–22 Slovak Cup winners.)	0–1	0–0	—	1–0	0–1	1–0
4	DAC Dunajská Streda (O)	32	12	10	10	39	37	+2	46	Qualification for the Europa Conference League play-offs	2–0	2–3	1–1	—	0–0	2–0
5	Sereď (R)	32	10	9	13	34	46	−12	39	Relegation (Note: Sereď did not obtain a license for the next season and were automatically relegated.)	0–3	1–3	0–2	0–0	—	1–1
6	Žilina	32	8	10	14	43	52	−9	34	Qualification for the Europa Conference League play-offs	2–3	0–2	1–2	2–2	1–1	—

Source: Niké liga (in Slovak)
Legend: Blue = home team win; Yellow = draw; Red = away team win.
Rules for classification: 1) Points; 2) Head-to-head points; 3) Head-to-head goal difference; 4) Head-to-head away goals scored; 5) Play-off.
(C) Champions; (O) Play-off winners; (R) Relegated

== Relegation group ==
Pos	Team	Pld	W	D	L	GF	GA	GD	Pts	Qualification or relegation	TRE	TLM	ZMI	SEN	ZLM	POH
7	Trenčín	32	13	9	10	58	43	+15	48	Qualification for the Europa Conference League play-offs	—	5–2	2–2	4–1	4–3	2–0
8	Tatran Liptovský Mikuláš	32	11	7	14	42	57	−15	40	Qualification for the Europa Conference League play-offs	0–3	—	3–1	2–1	2–2	1–0
9	Zemplín Michalovce	32	12	4	16	32	42	−10	40		1–0	1–2	—	1–0	1–0	1–0
10	Senica (R)	32	9	7	16	29	51	−22	34	Relegation (Note: Senica did not obtain a license for the next season and were automatically relegated.)	0–3	0–3	2–1	—	0–0	2–1
11	Zlaté Moravce	32	7	9	16	33	50	−17	30		0–2	0–1	1–1	3–2	—	1–3
12	Pohronie (R)	32	4	6	22	27	59	−32	18	Relegation to the 2. Liga	1–1	1–1	1–2	1–0	0–1	—

Source: Niké liga (in Slovak)
Legend: Blue = home team win; Yellow = draw; Red = away team win.
Rules for classification: 1) Points; 2) Head-to-head points; 3) Head-to-head goal difference; 4) Head-to-head away goals scored; 5) Play-off.
(R) Relegated

== Europa Conference League play-offs ==
Semi-finals
4	DAC Dunajská Streda	4
8	Tatran Liptovský Mikuláš	2
6	Žilina	0
7	Trenčín	2

Final
4	DAC Dunajská Streda	2
7	Trenčín	1

=== Semi-finals ===
24 May 2022
18:00 CEST (UTC+02:00)

Žilina	0–2	Trenčín
	Report	Kozlovský 44'; Kupusović 49'

Štadión pod Dubňom, Žilina
Attendance: 1,065
Referee: Michal Smolák
24 May 2022
19:30 CEST (UTC+02:00)

DAC Dunajská Streda	4–2	Tatran Liptovský Mikuláš
Nebyla 8'; Cigaņiks 27'; Andzouana 58'; Krstović 64'	Report	Káčerík 67'; Flak 79'

MOL Aréna, Dunajská Streda
Attendance: 4,338
Referee: Peter Kráľovič

=== Final ===
27 May 2022
20:00 CEST (UTC+02:00)

DAC Dunajská Streda	2–1	Trenčín
Kružliak 26'; Krstović 85'	Report	Azango 72'

MOL Aréna, Dunajská Streda
Attendance: 5,257
Referee: Ivan Kružliak

== Season statistics ==
As of 27 May 2022

=== Top goalscorers ===
Rank	Player	Club	Goals
1	(Slovakia) Jakub Kadák	Trenčín	13
2	(Nigeria) Philip Azango^{1}	Trenčín	10
2	(Slovakia) Martin Regáli	Ružomberok	10
4	(Nigeria) Ezekiel Henty	Slovan Bratislava	9
5	(North Macedonia) Milan Ristovski	Spartak Trnava	8
5	(Czech Republic) Jaromír Zmrhal	Slovan Bratislava	8
5	(Slovakia) Miloš Lačný	Pohronie	8
8	(Democratic Republic of the Congo) Elvis Mashike Sukisa	Senica	7
8	(Slovakia) Vladimír Weiss	Slovan Bratislava	7
8	(Slovakia) Samuel Mráz	Slovan Bratislava	7
8	(Serbia) Njegoš Kupusović^{1}	Trenčín	7
8	(Slovakia) Martin Boďa	Ružomberok	7
8	(Montenegro) Nikola Krstović^{2}	DAC Dunajská Streda	7
8	(Slovakia) Tomáš Ďubek	Zlaté Moravce	7
8	(Serbia) Dragan Andrić	Tatran Liptovský Mikuláš	7

^{1} plus 1 play-off goal
^{2} plus 2 play-off goals

=== Hat-tricks ===
Round	Player	For	Against	Result	Date	Ref
6	(Nigeria) Ezekiel Henty	Slovan Bratislava	Zlaté Moravce	4–1 (H)	29 August 2021	
22	(Montenegro) Nikola Krstović	DAC Dunajská Streda	Žilina	3–1 (H)	26 February 2022	
8.R	(Serbia) Njegoš Kupusović	Trenčín	Tatran Liptovský Mikuláš	5–2 (H)	30 April 2022	

=== Clean sheets ===
Rank	Player	Club	Clean sheets
1	(Slovakia) Dominik Takáč	Spartak Trnava	18
2	(Slovakia) Ivan Krajčírik	Ružomberok	16
3	(Czech Republic) Martin Jedlička	DAC Dunajská Streda	8
3	(Slovakia) Adrián Chovan	Slovan Bratislava	8
5	(Slovakia) Michal Kukučka	Trenčín	7
6	(Slovakia) Henrich Ravas	Senica	6
7	(Slovakia) Benjamín Száraz	Zemplín Michalovce	5
8	(Slovakia) Michal Šulla	Slovan Bratislava	4
8	(North Macedonia) Dejan Iliev	Sereď (3)/Trenčín (1)	4
8	(Slovakia) Matúš Kira	Zlaté Moravce	4
8	(Ukraine) Andriy Kozhukhar	Zemplín Michalovce	4
8	(Slovakia) Martin Chudý	Sereď	4
8	(Hungary) Dániel Veszelinov	DAC Dunajská Streda	4
8	(Slovakia) Patrik Lukáč	Zlaté Moravce	4

=== Discipline ===
==== Player ====
- Most yellow cards: 10
  - (Croatia) Marin Ljubičić (Sereď)
- Most red cards: 2
  - (Slovakia) Dominik Špiriak (Pohronie)

==== Club ====
- Most yellow cards: 71
  - Sereď
- Most red cards: 4
  - Senica
  - Pohronie
  - Sereď

== Awards ==
=== Monthly awards ===
Month	Player of the Month		Goal of the Month		References
Month	Player	Club	Player	Club	References
July/August	(Slovakia) Jakub Kadák	Trenčín	(Hungary) András Schäfer	DAC Dunajská Streda	
September	(Slovakia) Erik Jendrišek	Trenčín	(Slovakia) Ľuboslav Laura	Tatran Liptovský Mikuláš	
October	(Slovakia) Ján Maslo	Ružomberok	(Greece) Kyriakos Savvidis	Spartak Trnava	
November	(Slovakia) Martin Regáli	Ružomberok	(Indonesia) Egy Maulana Vikri	Senica	
December	(Slovakia) Lukáš Fabiš	Ružomberok	(Slovakia) Matej Trusa	Zemplín Michalovce	
February	(Croatia) Roko Jureškin	Sereď	(Croatia) Roko Jureškin	Sereď	
March	(Slovakia) Vladimír Weiss Jr.	Slovan Bratislava	(Germany) Brahim Moumou	DAC Dunajská Streda	
April	(Slovakia) Tomáš Ďubek	Zlaté Moravce	(Latvia) Andrejs Cigaņiks	DAC Dunajská Streda	
May	(Montenegro) Nikola Krstović	DAC Dunajská Streda	(Montenegro) Nikola Krstović	DAC Dunajská Streda	

=== Annual awards ===
==== Individual awards ====
Award	Winner	Club
Manager of the Season	(Slovakia) Vladimír Weiss	Slovan Bratislava
Player of the Season	(Slovakia) Vladimír Weiss Jr.	Slovan Bratislava
Young Player of the Season	(Slovakia) Jakub Kadák	Trenčín

==== Team of the Season ====

Team of the Season was:

Team of the Season
Goalkeeper	(Slovakia) Dominik Takáč (Spartak Trnava)				
Defenders	(Slovakia) Matej Madleňák (Ružomberok)		(Slovakia) Martin Škrtel (Spartak Trnava)	(Georgia (country)) Guram Kashia (Slovan Bratislava)	(Slovakia) Lukáš Fabiš (Ružomberok)
Midfielders	(Nigeria) Philip Azango (Trenčín)	(Nigeria) Ibrahim Rabiu (Slovan Bratislava)	(Slovakia) Jakub Kadák (Trenčín)	(Georgia (country)) Jaba Kankava (Slovan Bratislava)	(Slovakia) Vladimír Weiss Jr. (Slovan Bratislava)
Forward	(Slovakia) Martin Regáli (Ružomberok)				

==== Under-21 Team of the Season ====
Under-21 Team of the Season
Goalkeeper	(Slovakia) Ivan Krajčírik (Ružomberok)					
Defenders	(Spain) Alex Méndez (Zemplín Michalovce)		(Slovakia) Sebastian Kóša (Spartak Trnava)		(Croatia) Roko Jureškin (Sereď)	
Midfielders	(Greece) Alexandros Kyziridis (Zlaté Moravce)	(Slovakia) Filip Lichý (Slovan Bratislava/Ružomberok)	(Slovakia) Matúš Begala (Zemplín Michalovce)	(Slovakia) Samuel Lavrinčík (Trenčín)	(Slovakia) Jakub Kadák (Trenčín)	(Nigeria) Bamidele Yusuf (Spartak Trnava)
Forward	(Slovakia) Tomáš Bobček (Ružomberok)					

== See also ==
- 2021–22 Slovak Cup
- 2021–22 2. Liga (Slovakia)
- 2022–23 UEFA Champions League
- 2022–23 UEFA Europa Conference League
- List of Slovak football transfers summer 2021
- List of Slovak football transfers winter 2021–22
- List of foreign Slovak First League players
