= 2020–21 2. Liga (Slovakia) =

2. Liga
- Season: 2020–21
- Champions: MFK Tatran Liptovský Mikuláš
- Promoted: MFK Tatran Liptovský Mikuláš
- Relegated: FK Poprad
- Top goalscorer: Wisdom Kanu (18)

The 2020–21 2. Liga (Slovakia) was the 28th edition of the second tier 2. Liga footbal annual tournament in Slovakia, since its establishment in 1993.

== Teams ==
=== Stadiums and locations ===
Location of teams in Slovak 2. liga 2020–21

Team	Location	Stadium	Capacity
Železiarne Podbrezová	Podbrezová	ZELPO Aréna	4,061
MFK Skalica	Skalica	Mestský štadión Skalica	1,500
FK Dubnica	Dubnica nad Váhom	Mestský futbalový štadión	5,450
MFK Dukla Banská Bystrica	Banská Bystrica	MFK Zvolen Stadium	9,881
FC Petržalka	Petržalka	Štadión FC Petržalka	1,600
FK Poprad	Poprad	NTC Poprad	5,070
MŠK Žilina B	Žilina	Štadión pod Dubňom	11,258
KFC Komárno	Komárno	Mestský štadión Komárno	1,250
FC ŠTK 1914 Šamorín	Šamorín	Pomlé Stadium	1,950
MFK Tatran Liptovský Mikuláš	Liptovský Mikuláš	Stadium Liptovský Mikuláš	1,950
Partizán Bardejov	Bardejov	Mestský štadión Bardejov	3,040
FK Slavoj Trebišov	Trebišov	Štadión Slavoj Trebišov	2,000
Slovan Bratislava U21	Bratislava	Štadión Pasienky	11,401
MŠK Púchov	Púchov	Mestský štadión Púchov	6,614
FC Košice	Košice	Štadión Lokomotívy	9,000

=== Personnel and kits ===
Note: Flags indicate national team as has been defined under FIFA eligibility rules. Players and Managers may hold more than one non-FIFA nationality.

Team	Head coach	Captain	Kit manufacturer	Shirt sponsor
MFK Skalica	(Slovakia) Jozef Kostelník	(Slovakia) Martin Nagy	(Germany) Puma	-
FK Slavoj Trebišov	(Slovakia) Ondrej Desiatnik	(Slovakia) Tomáš Ilinjo	(Germany) Adidas	Armstav
FK Poprad	(Slovakia) Stanislav Ďuriš	(Slovakia) Matej Grešák	(Germany) Adidas	Ritro
MŠK Žilina B	(Slovakia) Norbert Gula	(Slovakia) Adam Kopas	(United States) Nike	Preto
KFC Komárno	(Slovakia) Szilárd Németh	(Slovakia) Kristóf Domonkos	(Germany) Adidas	MOL
MFK Tatran Liptovský Mikuláš	(Slovakia) Marek Petruš	(Slovakia) Richard Bartoš	(Italy) Sportika SA	Verex
Partizán Bardejov	(Belgium) Hajrudin Nuhic	(Slovakia) Ján Čikoš-Pavličko	(Germany) Adidas	SETL SK
FC Petržalka	(Slovakia) Ladislav Pecko	(Slovakia) Boris Turčák	(Italy) Erreà	-
FC ŠTK 1914 Šamorín	(Slovakia) Ján Blaháč	(Slovakia) Ľubomír Mezovský	(Italy) Kappa	Slovnaft
FK Dubnica	(Slovakia) Peter Jakuš	(Slovakia) Dalibor Pleva	(Germany) Adidas	-
MFK Dukla Banská Bystrica	(Slovakia) Stanislav Varga	(Slovakia) Róbert Polievka	(Germany) Adidas	Veolia
Slovan Bratislava U21	(Slovakia) Stanislav Moravec	(Slovakia) TBA	(Germany) Adidas	grafobal
MŠK Púchov	(Slovakia) Lukáš Kaplan	(Slovakia) František Brezničan	(Germany) Jako	-
FC Košice	(Slovakia) Jozef Vukušič	(Slovakia) František Vancák	(Germany) Adidas	BMW Regnum Košice
Podbrezová	(Slovakia) Mikuláš Radványi	(Slovakia) Erik Grendel	(Germany) Adidas	Železiarne Podbrezová

== League table ==
Pos	Team	Pld	W	D	L	GF	GA	GD	Pts	Promotion, qualification or relegation
1	Tatran Liptovský Mikuláš (C, P)	28	18	6	4	55	26	+29	60	Promotion to Fortuna liga
2	Dukla Banská Bystrica	28	17	5	6	70	38	+32	56	Qualification to Promotion play-offs
3	Skalica	28	16	7	5	55	32	+23	55	
4	Železiarne Podbrezová	28	16	6	6	57	25	+32	54	
5	Košice	28	15	4	9	40	27	+13	49	
6	Šamorín	28	12	5	11	41	34	+7	41	
7	Púchov	28	11	5	12	40	45	−5	38	
8	Komárno	28	11	5	12	31	42	−11	38	
9	Petržalka	28	10	7	11	37	41	−4	37	
10	Slavoj Trebišov	28	9	8	11	47	48	−1	35	
11	Dubnica	28	8	9	11	28	37	−9	33	
12	Žilina B	28	9	6	13	56	47	+9	33	
13	Partizán Bardejov	28	6	10	12	27	41	−14	28	
14	Slovan Bratislava U21	28	7	0	21	32	70	−38	21	
15	Poprad (R)	28	3	1	24	25	88	−63	4 (Note: FK Poprad was punished by subtracting 6 points.)	Relegation to 3. Liga

Source: Futbalnet (in Slovak)
Rules for classification: 1) Points; 2) Head-to-head points; 3) Head-to-head goal difference; 4) Head-to-head away goals scored; 5) Play-off.
(C) Champions; (P) Promoted; (R) Relegated

== Results ==
Each team plays home-and-away against every other team in the league, for a total of 28 matches each.

Home \ Away	DBB	LMI	POD	SKA	KOŠ	SAM	KOM	PÚC	STV	PET	ZAB	DUB	PAR	SJN	POP
Dukla Banská Bystrica		4–4	1–0	2–3	2–0	1–1	5–1	4–1	6–1	1–2	6–3	1–0	1–0	4–0	4–0
Tatran Liptovský Mikuláš	1–0		1–1	2–1	0–1	3–0	1–1	1–2	2–1	1–0	2–1	3–0	1–1	5–2	2–0
Podbrezová	3–4	1–2		3–1	0–0	1–1	2–0	4–2	2–0	2–1	5–0	3–0	1–1	1–0	4–0
Skalica	2–1	3–0	3–4		5–1	3–1	3–2	1–1	3–1	3–0	1–0	2–0	1–0	0–1	3–0
Košice	1–2	0–3	1–0	1–0		2–1	5–0	3–1	3–0	0–4	1–0	5–0	1–0	3–0	0–1
Šamorín	0–1	0–1	0–2	1–2	0–1		0–1	2–0	3–1	3–1	1–1	3–0	5–0	4–1	3–1
Komárno	1–1	1–2	2–1	0–0	1–0	1–3		0–2	2–1	1–0	2–0	0–1	1–0	3–2	4–1
Púchov	0–3	0–2	1–0	1–1	0–1	1–1	1–0		1–0	3–1	1–0	0–1	3–0	2–0	0–1
Slavoj Trebišov	3–3	0–2	3–3	1–1	1–1	1–0	2–0	2–2		2–4	3–1	4–1	1–0	5–1	3–0
Petržalka	1–1	1–1	0–4	1–1	1–1	1–2	1–3	3–2	0–3		1–0	1–1	3–2	2–0	1–0
Žilina B	2–3	2–2	1–2	2–3	2–1	5–0	1–1	5–1	2–2	1–2		2–2	3–0	3–1	6–0
Dubnica	0–1	0–1	0–0	2–2	1–0	0–1	3–0	0–2	1–1	0–0	1–1		2–2	1–0	5–2
Partizán Bardejov	3–1	1–0	0–1	1–1	1–2	1–1	0–0	2–2	1–1	1–1	1–4	0–0		2–1	2–1
Slovan Bratislava U21	4–3	1–5	0–3	1–2	0–4	0–1	2–0	4–3	2–1	2–1	1–2	0–4	1–2		5–1
Poprad	1–4	1–5	0–4	2–4	1–1	1–3	2–3	3–5	1–3	0–3	1–6	0–2	1–3	3–0	

Source: Futbalnet (in Slovak)
Legend: Blue = home team win; Yellow = draw; Red = away team win.

== Season statistics ==
As of 21 May 2021

=== Top goalscorers ===
Rank	Player	Club	Goals
1	(Nigeria) Wisdom Kanu	Trebišov	18
2	(Slovakia) Daniel Šebesta	Skalica	17
2	(Montenegro) Miladin Vujošević	Banská Bystrica	17
4	(Slovakia) Richard Bartoš	Liptovský Mikuláš	15
5	(Slovakia) Martin Rymarenko	Šamorín	14
6	(Slovakia) Róbert Polievka	Banská Bystrica	13
7	(Slovakia) Lukáš Gašparovič	Petržalka	12
8	(Slovakia) Roland Galčík	Podbrezová	11
9	(Slovakia) Michal Ranko	Skalica	10
9	(Slovakia) Daniel Pavúk	Podbrezová	10
10	(Nigeria) Usman Adekunle Issa	Trebišov	9
10	(Nigeria) Taofiq Jibril	Žilina B	9

=== Top Eleven ===
- Goalkeeper: (Slovakia) Matúš Kira (FC Košice)
- Defence: (Slovakia) František Pavúk (FC Košice), (Slovakia) Boris Godál (Podbrezová), (Slovakia) Michal Ranko (MFK Skalica), (Slovakia) Lukáš Migaľa (Banská Bystrica)
- Midfield: (Slovakia) Erik Grendel (Podbrezová), (Slovakia) Richard Bartoš (Liptovský Mikuláš), (Nigeria) Wisdom Kanu (FK Slavoj Trebišov)
- Attack: (Slovakia) Daniel Šebesta (MFK Skalica), (Slovakia) Roland Galčík (Podbrezová), (Slovakia) Róbert Polievka (Banská Bystrica)

=== Individual awards ===
Manager of the season

(Slovakia) Stanislav Varga (Banská Bystrica)

Player of the Year

(Slovakia) Róbert Polievka (Banská Bystrica)

Young player of the Year

(Slovakia) Roland Galčík (Podbrezová)
