= Pavuk =

Pavúk (Slovak feminine: Pavúková) or Pavuk is a surname which means spider in several Slavic languages. Notable people with the surname include:

- Daniel Pavúk (born 1998), Slovak footballer
- František Pavúk (born 1993), Slovak football defender
- Viktória Pavuk (born 1985), Hungarian figure skater
