= Martin Šindelář =

Czech footballer (born 1991)

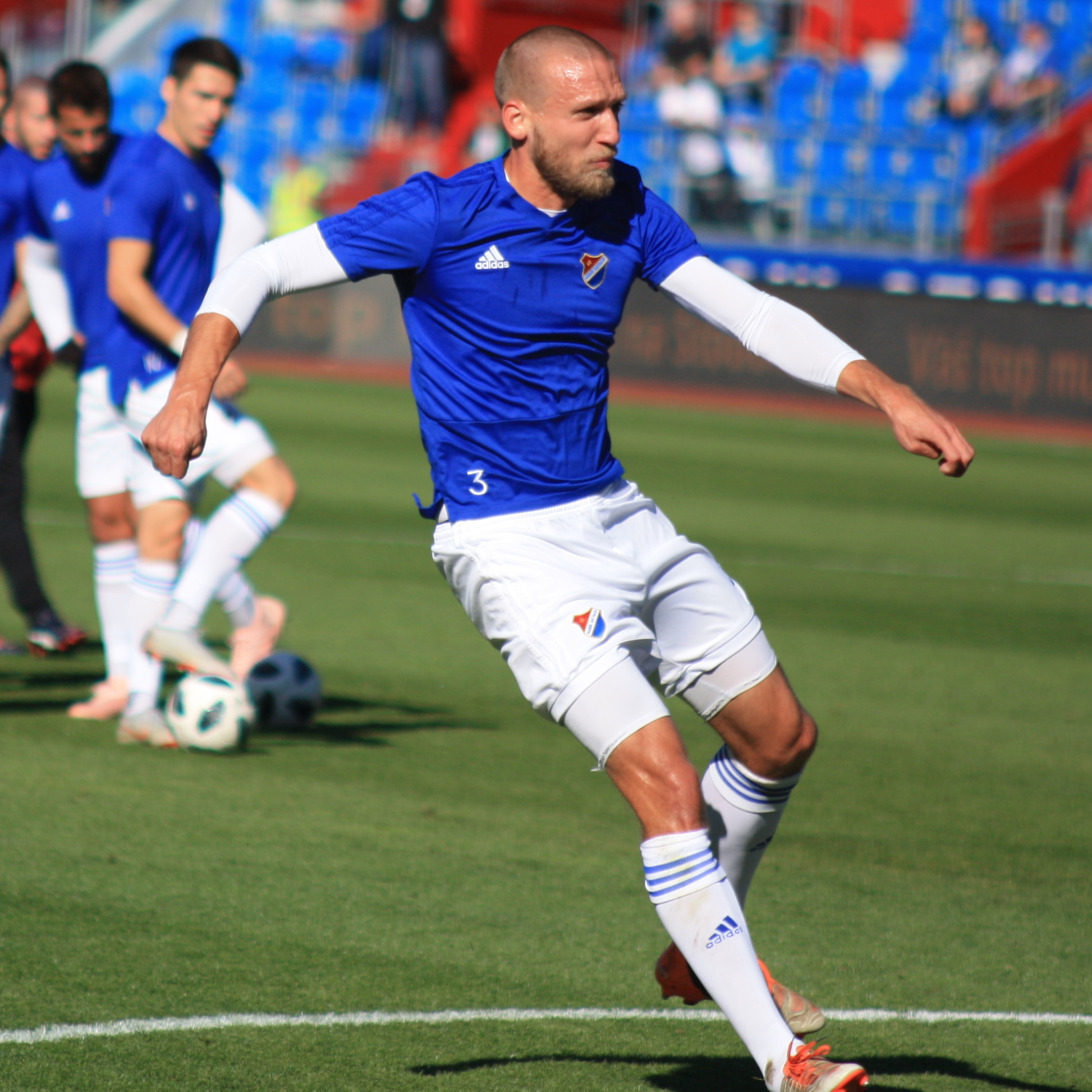

Personal information
- Full name: Martin Šindelář
- Date of birth: 22 January 1991 (age 35)
- Place of birth: Czechoslovakia
- Height: 1.89 m (6 ft 2 in)
- Position: Centre-back

Team information
- Current team: Prostějov
- Number: 13

Youth career
- 1998–2001: Sigma Olomouc
- 2001–2006: HFK Olomouc
- 2006–2009: Sigma Olomouc

Senior career*
Years	Team	Apps	(Gls)
2010	Sigma Olomouc B		
2011–2017	Sigma Olomouc	106	(4)
2011	→ Sokolov (loan)	31	(1)
2015	→ Sigma Olomouc B (loan)	8	(1)
2017–2020	Baník Ostrava	61	(4)
2020	→ Karviná (loan)	13	(0)
2020–2022	Karviná	53	(0)
2022	→ Liptovský Mikuláš (loan)	14	(0)
2023–2024	FC Košice	39	(1)
2024–	Prostějov	50	(6)

International career
2010	Czech Republic U19	3	(0)
- * Club domestic league appearances and goals as of 28 May 2026

Martin Šindelář (born 22 January 1991) is a Czech footballer who plays for 1. SK Prostějov as a centre-back.

== Club career ==
=== MFK Tatran Liptovský Mikuláš ===
Šindelář made his Fortuna Liga debut for Zlaté Moravce against Liptovský Mikuláš on 12 February 2022.

== Honours ==
SK Sigma Olomouc

- Czech Supercup: 2012
