= Dávid Filinský =

Slovak footballer

Personal information
- Full name: Dávid Filinský
- Date of birth: 18 January 1999 (age 27)
- Place of birth: Spišská Nová Ves, Slovakia
- Height: 1.85 m (6 ft 1 in)
- Position: Defensive midfielder

Team information
- Current team: Tatran Liptovský Mikuláš
- Number: 28

Youth career
- 2008–2015: Spišská Nová Ves
- 2014–2015: → Senica (loan)
- 2015–2016: Virtus Entella
- 2016–2017: Pordenone
- 2017–2018: Torino

Senior career*
Years	Team	Apps	(Gls)
2016−2017	Pordenone	1	(0)
2018−2019	Ružomberok B	9	(0)
2019−2021	Ružomberok	17	(0)
2021–	Tatran Liptovský Mikuláš	28	(0)

International career^{‡}
2017	Slovakia U18	10	(0)
2017−2018	Slovakia U19	3	(0)
- * Club domestic league appearances and goals as of 3 May 2023 ‡ National team caps and goals as of 27 March 2018

Dávid Filinský (born 18 January 1999) is a Slovak professional footballer who plays for Tatran Liptovský Mikuláš as a defender.

== Club career ==
=== MFK Ružomberok ===
Filinský made his Fortuna Liga debut for Ružomberok in a home fixture against Slovan Bratislava on 6 October 2019, coming on as an added time replacement for Martin Regáli.
