= Tomáš Horák =

Slovak footballer

Personal information
- Full name: Tomáš Horák
- Date of birth: 3 August 1998 (age 28)
- Place of birth: Slovakia
- Height: 1.84 m (6 ft 0 in)
- Position: Forward

Team information
- Current team: Sportunion St. Martin im Mühlkreis

Youth career
- 2008–2016: FK FC 31 Jarok

Senior career*
Years	Team	Apps	(Gls)
2015–2021	FK FC 31 Jarok	58	(49)
2018–2020	→ ŠK Báb (loan)	56	(36)
2021	→ Slovan Galanta (loan)	17	(8)
2022	ViOn Zlaté Moravce	20	(3)
2023	Slovan Galanta	26	(7)
2024–	Sportunion St. Martin im Mühlkreis	0	(0)
- * Club domestic league appearances and goals as of 13 January 2023

Tomáš Horák (born 3 August 1998) is a Slovak professional footballer who plays as a forward.

== Club career ==
=== FC ViOn Zlaté Moravce ===
Horák made his Fortuna Liga debut for ViOn Zlaté Moravce against Tatran Liptovský Mikuláš on 12 February 2022.
