= Michal Janec =

Slovak footballer

Personal information
- Full name: Michal Janec
- Date of birth: 28 April 1992 (age 34)
- Place of birth: Czechoslovakia
- Position: Left back

Team information
- Current team: Dolný Kubín

Youth career
- Žilina

Senior career*
Years	Team	Apps	(Gls)
2010–2013	Žilina	0	(0)
2011	→ Rimavská Sobota (loan)	10	(1)
2012	→ Liptovský Mikuláš (loan)	31	(0)
2013–2015	Slovan Liberec	0	(0)
2013	→ Ružomberok (loan)	7	(0)
2014	→ Třinec (loan)	4	(0)
2014	→ Kolín (loan)	10	(0)
2015	→ Lokomotíva Zvolen (loan)	14	(1)
2015–2016	Iskra Borčice	12	(0)
2016–2022	Liptovský Mikuláš	118	(2)
2022–	Dolný Kubín	?	(?)
2023–	Závažná Poruba		

International career^{‡}
2010	Slovakia U19		
2013	Slovakia U21	4	(1)
- * Club domestic league appearances and goals as of 8 January 2020 ‡ National team caps and goals as of 11 June 2013

Michal Janec (born 28 April 1992) is a Slovak football defender who currently plays for amateur club Závažná Poruba.

== Club career ==
=== Early career ===
He began his football career in Žilina, where he worked his way up through the youth ranks to the first team in 2010. In 2011, he was on loan at Rimavská Sobota and then on loan at Liptovský Mikuláš. In the winter transfer window of the 2012/13 season, he transferred to the Czech team FC Slovan Liberec, which became his first foreign engagement. Janec did not play a single match for the first team. He played on loan at other clubs. During the autumn part of the 2013/14 season, he went to MFK Ružomberok. He made his debut for Ružomberok in a 2–1 win against FK Dukla Banská Bystrica, playing the whole match.

=== Loans ===
In the spring of 2014 Janec played for the Czech team Třinec, in the autumn of 2014 he headed to the Czech Kolín, and in the spring part of the 2014/15 season he played for Lokomotiv Zvolen. In the summer of 2015, he finally left Liberec and signed a contract with TJ Iskra Borčice, a newcomer to the second Slovak league at the time.

=== Liptovský Mikuláš ===
In 2016, Janec joined 2. Liga club MFK Tatran Liptovský Mikuláš. In 2021, his team got promoted to the Slovak First Football League, replacing FC Nitra due to financial reasons. Janec made his First Division debut for Liptovsky Mikuláš in a 3–1 defeat to FK DAC 1904 Dunajska Streda. His first contribution would come in a 5–1 win against FK Pohronie, assisting a goal scored by Robin Hranáč.

== International career ==
Janec has previously played for the Slovak national teams under 19 and 21.
