= Tomáš Gerát =

Slovak footballer (born 1993)

Personal information
- Full name: Tomáš Gerát
- Date of birth: 16 May 1993 (age 33)
- Place of birth: Slovakia
- Height: 1.79 m (5 ft 10 in)
- Position: Midfielder

Team information
- Current team: Tatran Liptovský Mikuláš
- Number: 8

Youth career
- Ružomberok

Senior career*
Years	Team	Apps	(Gls)
2012–2013	Ružomberok B		
2013–2017	Ružomberok	42	(1)
2013	→ Dunajská Streda (loan)	14	(2)
2013	→ Námestovo (loan)		
2014	→ Rimavská Sobota (loan)	6	(0)
2017–2018	Železiarne Podbrezová B	15	(2)
2017–2018	Železiarne Podbrezová	1	(0)
2018–	Tatran Liptovský Mikuláš	175	(14)
- * Club domestic league appearances and goals as of 25 May 2026

Tomáš Gerát (born 16 May 1993) is a Slovak football player who currently plays for MFK Tatran Liptovský Mikuláš as a midfielder.

== Club career ==
=== MFK Ružomberok ===
Before his debut season, Gerát went out on loan to DAC Dunajská Streda, MŠK Námestovo and MŠK Rimavská Sobota.

He made his professional debut for Ružomberok against ViOn Zlaté Moravce on 19 July 2014. Gerát experienced his best season in Ružomberok in the 2014/2015 season, when he significantly contributed to helping the team survive in the top flight. He played 26 matches under coaches Ladislav Šimč and then Ivan Galád. His first and only goal for the roses came in a 2–1 loss against ŠK Slovan Bratislava, scoring in the 65th minute of the game. Following the season, Gerát was considered as the 10th best young player in the Slovak First Football League.

=== Železiarne Podbrezová ===
In 2017, Gerát joined fellow league outfit FK Železiarne Podbrezová. He made his only appearance for the A-team of Podbrezová in a historic 8–1 defeat against AS Trenčín. The loss was considered one of the biggest defeats in the history of the Slovak First Football League.

=== Tatran Liptovský Mikuláš ===
In 2018, Gerát joined 2. Liga club MFK Tatran Liptovský Mikuláš. He experienced promotion to the top flight with the club in 2020–21 season. Gerát made his first league debut for his club in a 4–1 defeat against ŠK Slovan Bratislava, playing 90 minutes of the game. His first goal came in a 2–1 win against FK Senica, scoring in the 89th minute of the game to secure a win for Tatran. In 2023, Gerát signed an extension to his contract with the club.
