= Dragan Andrić (footballer) =

Serbian footballer

Personal information
- Full name: Dragan Andrić
- Date of birth: 14 September 1989 (age 37)
- Place of birth: SFR Yugoslavia
- Height: 1.81 m (5 ft 11 in)
- Position: Forward

Senior career*
Years	Team	Apps	(Gls)
–2012	Jedinstvo Paraćin		
2012–2014	Pušovce		
2013–2014	→ Bardejov (loan)	25	(3)
2015–2016	Purbach ams See	40	(22)
2016–2017	SC-ESV Parndorf	20	(1)
2017–2019	Liptovský Mikuláš	50	(20)
2019–2020	Poprad	21	(6)
2021–2022	Liptovský Mikuláš	32	(11)
2022–2023	Tatran Prešov	27	(5)
- * Club domestic league appearances and goals as of 26 May 2023

Dragan Andrić (Serbian Cyrillic: Драган Андрић; born 14 September 1989) is a Serbian professional footballer who plays as a forward.

== Club career ==
=== MFK Tatran Liptovský Mikuláš ===
Andrić made his professional Fortuna Liga debut for MFK Tatran Liptovský Mikuláš in a home fixture against Slovan Bratislava on 24 July 2021, coming on as an added time replacement for Adrián Káčerík.

=== Match fixing allegation ===
Andrić was suspended for 18 months by the Slovak FA after being found guilty of influencing the May 2023 game between Tatran Prešov and Považská Bystrica.
