= Peter Voško =

Slovak footballer

Personal information
- Full name: Peter Voško
- Date of birth: 17 August 2000 (age 26)
- Place of birth: Granč-Petrovce, Slovakia
- Height: 1.83 m (6 ft 0 in)
- Positions: Centre-back; forward

Team information
- Current team: Podhale Nowy Targ
- Number: 21

Youth career
- 2010–2012: FK Granč - Petrovce
- 2012–2014: Spišské Podhradie
- 2014–2018: Partizán Bardejov
- 2018: Železiarne Podbrezová

Senior career*
Years	Team	Apps	(Gls)
2018–2020	Železiarne Podbrezová	6	(0)
2019	→ Pohronie (loan)	7	(0)
2019	→ Partizán Bardejov (loan)	12	(2)
2020	→ Tatran Liptovský Mikuláš (loan)	1	(0)
2020–2025	Tatran Liptovský Mikuláš	136	(14)
2025–	Podhale Nowy Targ	30	(2)
- * Club domestic league appearances and goals as of 11:00, 31 May 2026 (UTC)

Peter Voško (born 17 August 2000) is a Slovak professional footballer who plays as a centre-back or forward for Polish club Podhale Nowy Targ.

== Club career ==
=== Železiarne Podbrezová ===
Voško made his professional debut for Železiarne Podbrezová against Spartak Trnava on 3 November 2018. He came on after some hour of play, replacing Endy Bernadina, when Podbrezová trailed one goal behind. Vakhtang Chanturishvili scored the goal in 90th minute, to seal Podbrezová's 0–2 defeat.

=== Tatran Liptovský Mikuláš ===
On 8 February 2020, Tatran Liptovský Mikuláš had announced a half-season loan agreement with Voško. This later extended to a full-time contract.

=== Podhale Nowy Targ ===
On 6 July 2025, Voško moved to Polish third division club Podhale Nowy Targ.

== International career ==
Veselovský enjoyed his first Slovakia U21 national team recognition on 17 March 2022 under Jaroslav Kentoš ahead of two 2023 Under-21 European Championship qualifiers against Northern Ireland and Spain, when he was listed as an alternate to the 23-player squad.
