= Péter Varga (footballer) =

Slovak footballer

Personal information
- Full name: Péter Varga
- Date of birth: 27 January 1998 (age 28)
- Place of birth: Šahy, Slovakia
- Height: 1.83 m (6 ft 0 in)
- Position: Midfielder

Team information
- Current team: ŠTK Šamorín
- Number: 16

Youth career
- FK Senica

Senior career*
Years	Team	Apps	(Gls)
2015–2017	FK Senica	14	(0)
2017–2020	Gyirmót	63	(2)
2020–2021	Púchov	27	(3)
2021–2022	Komárno	43	(5)
2023–2024	FC Košice	24	(0)
2025	Pohronie	11	(0)
2025–	ŠTK Šamorín	22	(1)
- * Club domestic league appearances and goals as of 25 May 2026

Péter Varga (born 27 January 1998) is a Slovak professional footballer currently playing for ŠTK Šamorín.

He made his career league debut for FK Senica on 22 September 2015 in a Slovak Super Liga 0–3 away loss at Zlaté Moravce at the age of 17 years, 7 months, and 26 days.
