= Kim Chan-soo =

South Korean footballer

Personal information
- Full name: Kim Chan-soo
- Date of birth: 17 February 2001 (age 25)
- Place of birth: Ansan, Gyeonggi, South Korea
- Height: 1.67 m (5 ft 6 in)
- Position: Attacking midfielder

Youth career
- –2019: FC KHT U18 Ildong
- 2019–2020: Yong In University
- 2020: Tatran Liptovský Mikuláš

Senior career*
Years	Team	Apps	(Gls)
2020–2021	Tatran Liptovský Mikuláš	28	(1)
- * Club domestic league appearances and goals as of 22 December 2021

Kim Chan-soo (Korean: 김찬수; born 17 February 2001) is a South Korean footballer who plays as a midfielder.

== Club career ==
=== MFK Tatran Liptovský Mikuláš ===
Kim made his professional debut for MFK Tatran Liptovský Mikuláš against ŠK Slovan Bratislava on 24 July 2021.
