= Tomáš Fryšták =

Czech footballer

Personal information
- Date of birth: 18 August 1987 (age 39)
- Place of birth: Uherské Hradiště, Czechoslovakia
- Height: 1.93 m (6 ft 4 in)
- Position: Goalkeeper

Youth career
- 1995–1997: TJ Vážany
- 1997–2006: Slovácko

Senior career*
| Years | Team | Apps | (Gls) |
| 2006−2016 | Slovácko | 2 | (0) |
| 2009−2010 | Čáslav | 5 | (0) |
| 2011−2013 | MAS Táborsko | 55 | (0) |
| 2014−2015 | Dynamo České Budějovice | 1 | (0) |
| 2015−2020 | Bohemians 1905 | 70 | (0) |
| 2020 | Baník Sokolov | 14 | (0) |
| 2020−2021 | Senica | 23 | (0) |
| 2021 | AS Trenčín | 2 | (0) |
| 2022−2026 | Slovácko | 21 | (0) |
| 2022−2026 | Slovácko B | 16 | (0) |

International career
| 2004 | Czech Republic U20 | 1 | (0) |
| 2006–2007 | Czech Republic U20 | 4 | (0) |
- * Club domestic league appearances and goals

Tomáš Fryšták (born 18 August 1987) is a Czech former footballer who played as a goalkeeper.

== Club career ==
Fryšták made his Slovak First Football League debut for Senica against Žilina on 8 August 2020.

Tomáš made his debut for AS Trenčín against Zemplín Michalovce on 7 August 2021. Trenčín won 2:1.

On 3 January 2022, Fryšták signed a contract with Slovácko.
