= Štefan Zaťko =

Slovak footballer and manager

Personal information
- Date of birth: 21 May 1962 (age 64)
- Place of birth: Czechoslovakia

Team information
- Current team: Pohronie (caretaker manager)

Senior career*
Years	Team	Apps	(Gls)
- Fotbal Třinec
- Raven Považská Bystrica

Managerial career
- NCHZ Nováky
- MŠK Topvar-Horná Nitra Topoľčany
- 2003: Matador Púchov
- 2004–2005: Slovan Bratislava
- 2005–2006: DAC 1904 Dunajská Streda
- 2006–2008: Čadca
- 2009–2010: Sokol Dolná Ždaňa
- 2010–2012: Dukla Banská Bystrica
- 2012–2016: Pohronie
- 2019–2020: Tatran Liptovský Mikuláš
- 2021–: Pohronie (interim)
- * Club domestic league appearances and goals

Štefan Zaťko (born 21 May 1962) is a Slovak football manager who manages Pohronie on a caretaker basis.

Zaťko has coached TSG Kälberau, Matador Púchov, Slovan Bratislava and Čadca, as well as Dukla Banská Bystrica.
