= Tomáš Staš =

Slovak footballer

Personal information
- Full name: Tomáš Staš
- Date of birth: 13 July 1996 (age 30)
- Place of birth: Liptovský Mikuláš, Slovakia
- Position: Midfielder

Team information
- Current team: Liptovský Mikuláš
- Number: 11

Youth career
- –2013: Liptovský Mikuláš

Senior career*
Years	Team	Apps	(Gls)
2013–	Liptovský Mikuláš	330	(44)
- * Club domestic league appearances and goals as of 25 May 2026

Tomáš Staš (born 13 July 1996) is a Slovak footballer who plays for MFK Tatran Liptovský Mikuláš as a midfielder.

== Club career ==
=== MFK Tatran Liptovský Mikuláš ===
Staš made his professional debut for MFK Tatran Liptovský Mikuláš against ŠK Slovan Bratislava on 24 July 2021.
