= Ľuboslav Laura =

Slovak footballer

Personal information
- Full name: Ľuboslav Laura
- Date of birth: 5 July 1994 (age 32)
- Place of birth: Dolný Kubín, Slovakia
- Position: Midfielder

Team information
- Current team: Liptovský Mikuláš
- Number: 19

Youth career
- Dolný Kubín
- 2009–2013: → Ružomberok (loan)

Senior career*
Years	Team	Apps	(Gls)
–2016	Dolný Kubín	45	(3)
2016	→ Sereď (loan)	14	(0)
2016–2018	Sereď	58	(9)
2018–	Liptovský Mikuláš	200	(37)
- * Club domestic league appearances and goals as of 25 May 2026

Ľuboslav Laura (born 5 July 1994) is a Slovak footballer who plays for MFK Tatran Liptovský Mikuláš as a midfielder.

== Club career ==
=== MFK Tatran Liptovský Mikuláš ===
Laura made his professional debut for MFK Tatran Liptovský Mikuláš against ŠK Slovan Bratislava on 24 July 2021.

== Honours ==
Individual

- Slovak Super Liga Goal of the Month: September 2021
