= Adrián Káčerík =

Slovak footballer

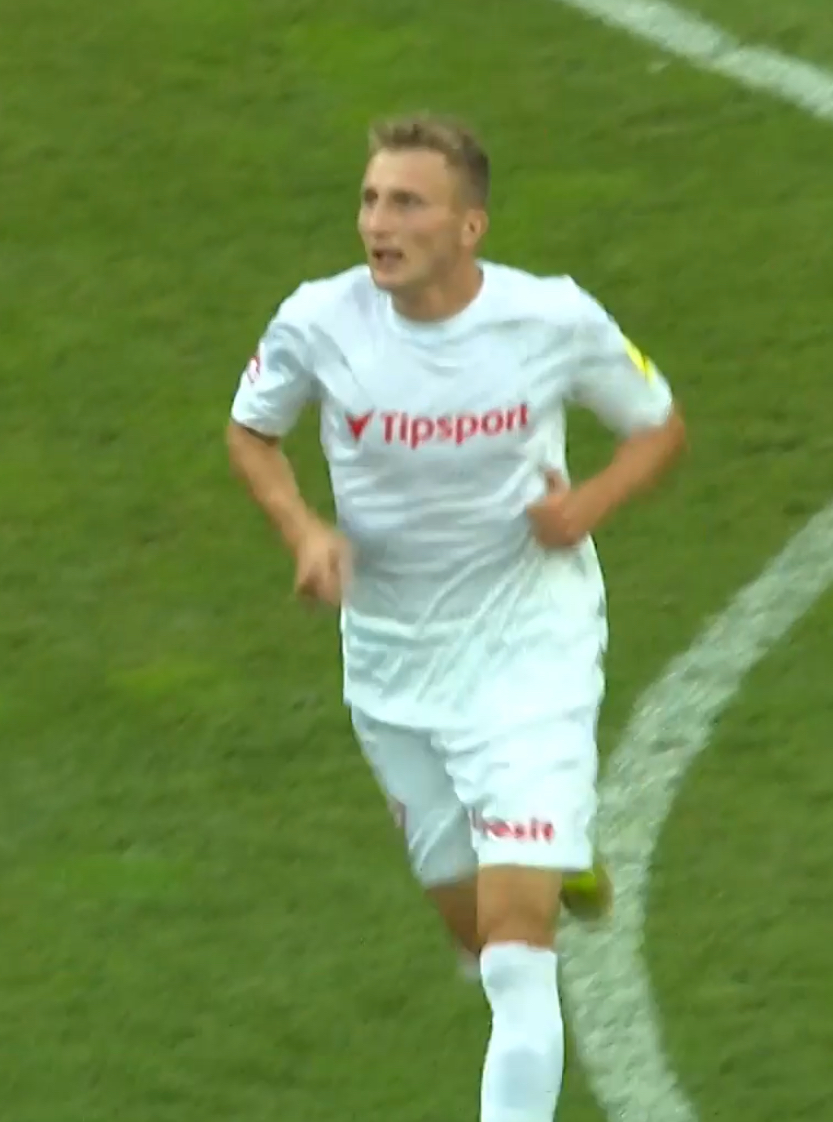
- Káčerík with Železiarne Podbrezová in 2022

Personal information
- Full name: Adrián Káčerík
- Date of birth: 2 August 1997 (age 29)
- Place of birth: Slovakia
- Height: 1.74 m (5 ft 9 in)
- Position: Midfielder

Team information
- Current team: Považská Bystrica
- Number: 7

Youth career
- –2009: ŠK Radoľa
- 2009–2012: Kysucké Nové Mesto
- 2012–2016: Železiarne Podbrezová

Senior career*
Years	Team	Apps	(Gls)
2015–2018	Železiarne Podbrezová B	27	(0)
2015–2021	Železiarne Podbrezová	7	(0)
2018–2022	Tatran Liptovský Mikuláš	108	(13)
2023–2024	Banská Bystrica	13	(0)
2023–2024	Dolný Kubín	15	(7)
2024	→ Tatran Prešov (loan)	5	(0)
2024–2026	Chojniczanka Chojnice	26	(0)
2026–	Považská Bystrica	0	(0)
- * Club domestic league appearances and goals as of 11:03, 31 May 2026 (UTC)

Adrián Káčerík (born 2 August 1997) is a Slovak professional footballer who plays as a midfielder for 2. Liga club Považská Bystrica.

== Club career ==
=== Železiarne Podbrezová ===
Káčerík made his professional Fortuna Liga debut for Železiarne Podbrezová against DAC Dunajská Streda on 14 May 2017, as a substitute for Matej Kochan, in the 89th minute of the match.
