= Adam Pajer =

Czech footballer (born 1995)

Personal information
- Full name: Adam Pajer
- Date of birth: 2 May 1995 (age 31)
- Place of birth: Mladá Boleslav, Czech Republic
- Height: 1.91 m (6 ft 3 in)
- Position: Centre-back

Team information
- Current team: Kosmonosy
- Number: 9

Youth career
- Mladá Boleslav

Senior career*
Years	Team	Apps	(Gls)
2014–2017	Mladá Boleslav	4	(0)
2015	→ Varnsdorf (loan)	9	(0)
2016–2017	→ Benátky nad Jizerou (loan)	4	(0)
2017	→ Senica (loan)	8	(1)
2017–2018	Hradec Králové	19	(0)
2018–2019	Poprad	45	(2)
2020–2021	Železiarne Podbrezová	26	(2)
2021–2022	Pohronie	26	(0)
2022–	Kosmonosy	34	(19)

International career
2014	Czech Republic U19	3	(0)
2014	Czech Republic U20	1	(0)
- * Club domestic league appearances and goals as of 20:02, 6 February 2024 (UTC)

Adam Pajer (born 2 May 1995) is a Czech footballer who currently plays for Kosmonosy.

== Career ==
=== FK Mladá Boleslav ===
Pajer made his professional debut for Mladá Boleslav against Viktoria Plzeň on 19 October 2014.

=== FK Pohronie ===
On 24 June 2021, Pohronie announced the signing of Pajer on a two-year contract. Pajer commented on the transfer positively, citing excitement by top division opportunities in a small but functioning club. Pohronie got relegated in the season and subsequently, Pajer had left the club.
