= Martin Regáli =

Slovak footballer

Personal information
- Date of birth: 12 October 1993 (age 33)
- Place of birth: Prešov, Slovakia
- Height: 1.80 m (5 ft 11 in)
- Positions: Forward; winger

Team information
- Current team: Tatran Prešov
- Number: 9

Youth career
- 2000–2010: Tatran Prešov
- 2010–2011: OŠK Kapušany
- 2011–2013: Zemplín Michalovce

Senior career*
Years	Team	Apps	(Gls)
2013–2019	Zemplín Michalovce	121	(19)
2019–2022	Ružomberok	97	(30)
2023	Kortrijk	13	(0)
2024–	Karviná	26	(4)
2025–	Tatran Prešov	31	(16)

International career^{‡}
2022	Slovakia	4	(0)
- * Club domestic league appearances and goals as of 17 May 2026 ‡ National team caps and goals as of 21:19, 1 July 2024 (UTC)

Martin Regáli (born 12 October 1993) is a Slovak professional footballer who plays as a forward for Slovak club FC Tatran Prešov.

Regáli won the 2014–15 DOXXbet liga with the Zemplín Michalovce.

== Biography ==
Regáli made his professional Fortuna Liga debut for Zemplín Michalovce against AS Trenčín on 18 July 2015. During the winter break of 2018–19 season, Regáli announced to the management of Zemplín that he will not extend a contract with the club.

In March 2022, Regáli received his first call-up for Slovak senior squad for friendly fixtures against Norway and Finland. He debuted in a 0–2 loss against the former opponent on 25 March, coming on as a substitute in the 35th minute to replace the injured Tomáš Suslov.

Regáli also signed for Kortrijk and Czech First League club Karviná, respectively on 3 January 2023 and 4 January 2024.

== Honours ==
Individual

- Slovak Super Liga Player of the Month: November 2021
- Slovak Super Liga Team of the Season: 2021–22
