= Matej Kochan =

Slovak footballer

Personal information
- Full name: Matej Kochan
- Date of birth: 21 November 1992 (age 33)
- Place of birth: Brezno, Czechoslovakia
- Height: 1.87 m (6 ft 2 in)
- Position: Midfielder

Team information
- Current team: Ružomberok
- Number: 11

Youth career
- 2007–2011: ŽP Šport Podbrezová

Senior career*
| Years | Team | Apps | (Gls) |
| 2011–2017 | ŽP Šport Podbrezová | 107 | (14) |
| 2017– | Ružomberok | 87 | (9) |

International career^{‡}
| 2012–2014 | Slovakia U21 | 8 | (0) |
- * Club domestic league appearances and goals as of 2 May 2023 ‡ National team caps and goals as of 11 July 2014

Matej Kochan (born 21 November 1992) is a Slovak professional footballer who currently plays for Fortuna Liga club Ružomberok.

== Club career ==
=== FO ŽP Šport Podbrezová ===
He made his Fortuna Liga debut for ŽP Šport Podbrezová in a Fortuna liga fixture against Slovan Bratislava on 11 July 2014. Slovan won the game 2:1.
