= Kristián Flak =

Slovak footballer

Personal information
- Full name: Kristián Flak
- Date of birth: 24 November 1999 (age 26)
- Place of birth: Košice, Slovakia
- Height: 1.74 m (5 ft 9 in)
- Position: Left-back

Youth career
- –2016: Slovan Bratislava
- 2016–2018: Sparta Prague

Senior career*
Years	Team	Apps	(Gls)
2018–2022	Sparta Prague B	?	(?)
2021–2022	→ Tatran Liptovský Mikuláš (loan)	27	(2)

International career
2016–2017	Slovakia U18	4	(0)
2018	Slovakia U20	1	(0)
- * Club domestic league appearances and goals as of 1 August 2022

Kristián Flak (born 24 November 1999) is a Slovak professional footballer.

== Career ==
=== MFK Tatran Liptovský Mikuláš ===
Flak made his professional debut for Tatran Liptovský Mikuláš against Slovan Bratislava on 24 July 2021.
