= František Pavúk =

Slovak footballer

Personal information
- Full name: František Pavúk
- Date of birth: 21 July 1993 (age 33)
- Place of birth: Košice, Slovakia
- Height: 1.86 m (6 ft 1 in)
- Position: Left back

Team information
- Current team: MFK Spartak Medzev

Youth career
- MFK Košice

Senior career*
Years	Team	Apps	(Gls)
2012–2015	MFK Košice	32	(1)
2016–2018	Lokomotíva Košice	84	(3)
2019–2024	FC Košice	64	(9)
2022	→ Liptovský Mikuláš (loan)	14	(0)
2023–2024	→ Slavoj Trebišov (loan)	13	(0)
2024–	Medzev	0	(0)
- * Club domestic league appearances and goals as of 21 July 2024

František Pavúk (born 21 July 1993) is a Slovak professional footballer who plays as a defender for MFK Spartak Medzev.

== MFK Košice ==
He made his debut for MFK Košice against Spartak Myjava on 22 September 2012.
