= Miloš Lačný =

Slovak footballer

Personal information
- Full name: Miloš Lačný
- Date of birth: 8 March 1988 (age 38)
- Place of birth: Levoča, Czechoslovakia
- Height: 1.83 m (6 ft 0 in)
- Position: Forward

Youth career
- TJ Spišský Štvrtok
- 1998–2003: Spišská Nová Ves
- 2003–2007: Ružomberok

Senior career*
Years	Team	Apps	(Gls)
2007–2009	Ružomberok	49	(16)
2010–2012	Sparta Prague	15	(0)
2011	→ Slovan Bratislava (loan)	12	(2)
2012	→ Dundee United (loan)	6	(1)
2013	Neman Grodno	11	(3)
2013	Ružomberok	16	(11)
2014	Kairat Almaty	11	(1)
2015	Śląsk Wrocław	6	(0)
2015–2017	Ružomberok	56	(17)
2017–2018	Žilina	8	(0)
2018	Torpedo Kutaisi	13	(2)
2019	iClinic Sereď	12	(4)
2020	AmaZulu	7	(0)
2020–2021	Sereď	20	(7)
2021–2022	Pohronie	29	(8)
2022	PDRM FC		
2023	Košice	17	(3)
2024–	Spišská Nová Ves	3	(2)

International career
2007	Slovakia U19	4	(0)
2009–2010	Slovakia U21	12	(1)
- * Club domestic league appearances and goals as of 19:09, 16 September 2024 (UTC)

Miloš Lačný (born 8 March 1988) is a Slovak professional footballer who plays as a forward for FK Spišská Nová Ves.

== Career ==
Lačný signed professional terms with Ružomberok in 2007, having spent the previous four years as a youth player and went on to score 16 goals in just under 50 league appearances. His form saw him go on trial to Scottish Premier League side Celtic in December 2009 but he signed a three-year contract with Sparta Prague in January 2010. Eighteen months later, in July 2011 and after just 15 league appearances for Sparta, Lačný returned to Celtic on trial. With no move materialising, he joined ŠK Slovan Bratislava in August 2011 on a six-month loan.

In January 2012, after his loan deal expired, Lačný returned to Scotland for a third time, this time on trial with Dundee United. and clinched a year-long loan move. He made his debut against Rangers in a fifth round clash of the Scottish Cup at Ibrox which Dundee United won 2-0. He scored his first goal for Dundee United in a 5-1 win against St Johnstone on 11 February 2012.

In February 2014, Lačný signed a three-year contract with Kazakhstan Premier League side Kairat Almaty.

In January 2015, Lačný signed for Ekstraklasa side Śląsk Wrocław on a six-month contract, with the option of another two-years. However, the contract extension was not exercised and he returned to Slovak side Ružomberok in September 2015.

In September 2017, he joined Žilina, before joining Georgian side Torpedo Kutaisi the following summer on a one-year contract. In February 2019, he returned to Slovakia, joining Sereď on a six-month contract.

He joined South African Premier Division side AmaZulu on an 18-month contract in January 2020.

Following his South African spell, he featured in Sereď under Gergely Geri. In the summer of 2021, the manager had signed with Pohronie and Lačný followed suit, becoming Pohronie's first signing in the transfer seasons.
