= Richard Bartoš =

Slovak footballer

Personal information
- Full name: Richard Bartoš
- Date of birth: 28 June 1992 (age 34)
- Place of birth: Czechoslovakia
- Height: 1.81 m (5 ft 11 in)
- Position: Midfielder

Team information
- Current team: Liptovský Mikuláš
- Number: 10

Youth career
- Ružomberok
- 2011: → Slovan Bratislava (loan)

Senior career*
Years	Team	Apps	(Gls)
2012–2015	Ružomberok	33	(2)
2015	→ Dolný Kubín (loan)	14	(2)
2015–2016	→ Sereď (loan)	25	(3)
2017–2019	Sereď	6	(1)
2018–2019	→ Liptovský Mikuláš (loan)	27	(10)
2019–	Liptovský Mikuláš	178	(65)

International career
- Slovakia U17
- * Club domestic league appearances and goals as of 25 May 2026

Richard Bartoš (born 28 June 1992) is a Slovak professional footballer who plays for MFK Tatran Liptovský Mikuláš.

== Club career ==
=== MFK Ružomberok ===
He made his debut for Ružomberok against Slovan Bratislava on 1 September 2012.
