= Wisdom Kanu =

Nigerian footballer

Personal information
- Full name: Wisdom Uda Kanu
- Date of birth: 27 March 1994 (age 32)
- Place of birth: Lagos, Nigeria
- Height: 1.75 m (5 ft 9 in)
- Position: Midfielder

Youth career
- Lagos Islanders

Senior career*
Years	Team	Apps	(Gls)
–2016	Lagos Islanders		
2016–2017	Spišská Nová Ves	10	(2)
2018–2019	Inter Bratislava	6	(0)
2018	→ ViOn Zlaté Moravce (loan)	0	(0)
2019–2020	Vranov nad Topľou	27	(11)
2020	→ Poprad (loan)	2	(0)
2020–2021	Slavoj Trebišov	27	(18)
2021–2023	Michalovce	60	(10)
2023–2024	Jerash		
- * Club domestic league appearances and goals as of 6 June 2023

Wisdom Kanu (born 27 March 1994) is a Nigerian professional footballer who plays as a midfielder.

== Career ==
=== MFK Zemplín Michalovce ===
Wisdom Kanu made his professional Fortuna Liga debut for Zemplín Michalovce against DAC 1904 Dunajská Streda on 25 July 2021.

=== Jerash ===
On 31 July 2023, Kanu joined Saudi Second Division side Jerash.
