= Matúš Kira =

Slovak footballer (born 1994)

Personal information
- Full name: Matúš Kira
- Date of birth: 10 October 1994 (age 32)
- Place of birth: Košice, Slovakia
- Height: 1.85 m (6 ft 1 in)
- Position: Goalkeeper

Team information
- Current team: Košice
- Number: 22

Youth career
- Snina
- 2010–2014: Zemplín Michalovce

Senior career*
Years	Team	Apps	(Gls)
2014–2020	Zemplín Michalovce	119	(0)
2016	→ Lokomotíva Košice (loan)	8	(0)
2020–2021	FC Košice	26	(0)
2021–2022	ViOn Zlaté Moravce	17	(0)
2022–	FC Košice	66	(0)

International career^{‡}
2015	Slovakia U21	1	(0)
- * Club domestic league appearances and goals as of 21 September 2026 ‡ National team caps and goals as of 15:52, 8 June 2022 (UTC)

Matúš Kira (born 10 October 1994) is a Slovak professional footballer who currently plays for Košice as a goalkeeper.

Kira won the 2014–15 DOXXbet liga with the Zemplín Michalovce.

== Club career ==
Kira was born in Košice, Slovakia. He made his Fortuna Liga debut for Zemplín Michalovce against AS Trenčín on 18 July 2015, conceding the sole goal of the game from Ryan Koolwijk.
