= MFK Tatran Liptovský Mikuláš =

Association football club in Slovakia

- Full name: MFK Tatran Liptovský Mikuláš
- Founded: 1934; 92 years ago
- Ground: Stadium Liptovský Mikuláš, Liptovský Mikuláš
- Capacity: 2200
- President: Milan Mikušiak
- Head coach: Marek Petruš
- League: 2. Liga
- 2025-26: 3rd
- Website: http://www.mfktatran.sk
| Home colours | Away colours |

Tatran Liptovský Mikuláš is a Slovak football club, playing in the town of Liptovský Mikuláš.

== History ==
=== Early years ===
The club was formed on 22 June 1934, following the example of some Liptovský municipalities and the municipality of Okoličné. The meeting consisted of many football enthusiasts from the community and Ján Devečka who officially declared the establishment of the football club.

The first elected chairman was JUDr. Sterllinger, who donated from his own private property the Pšaninách meadow (where today stands a dairy) on which to create a football field, which was the club's home until 1972.

The club's first football match was a friendly game against neighbouring ŠK Smrečany, taking place on 15 July 1934, the result ended 8–0 for the home team. The game was attended by more than 500 spectators and the match was officiated by referee Michal Vala.

=== 2021–2023: First division football ===
In the 2020-21 season, MFK Tatran was promoted to the Slovak First Football League for the first time in their history after winning the 2. Liga. In their first season in the top-flight, the club would finish second in the relegation play-offs with 40 points, winning 11 games out of 32. In the 2022–2023 season, the club got relegated from the first division after spending a single seasons there.

== Honours ==
=== Domestic ===
- Slovak Second Division (1993–)
  - Winners (1): 2020-21 (Promoted)
- Slovak Third Division (1993–)
  - Winners (1): 2006 (Promoted)
- Slovak Cup (1961–)
  - Quarter–finals 2017–18

== Affiliated club ==
The following club is currently affiliated with MFK Tatran Liptovský Mikuláš:

- (Slovakia) MŠK Žilina (2012–present)
- (South Korea) Kim Hee Tae Football Center Seoul (2020–present)

== Current squad ==
As of 21 July 2026

Note: Flags indicate national team as defined under FIFA eligibility rules; some limited exceptions apply. Players may hold more than one non-FIFA nationality.

| No. | Pos. | Nation | Player |
|---|---|---|---|
| 7 | MF | SVK | Adrián Macejko |
| 8 | MF | SVK | Tomáš Gerát (vice-captain) |
| 10 | FW | SVK | Richard Bartoš (captain) |
| 11 | MF | SVK | Tomáš Staš |
| 15 | FW | SVK | Simon Mojcak |
| 17 | FW | NGA | Emmanuel Okonji |
| 18 | MF | SVK | Samuel Gladiš |
| 19 | MF | SVK | Ľuboslav Laura |

| No. | Pos. | Nation | Player |
|---|---|---|---|
| 21 | DF | SVK | Samuel Kuchárik |
| 27 | FW | NGA | Abdulhakim Daneji |
| 28 | DF | SVK | Michal Piter-Bučko |
| 30 | GK | SVK | Adrián Slančík |
| — | MF | SVK | Lukáš Jendrek |
| — | FW | SVK | Samuel Chlepko |
| — | MF | BRA | Rafael Freitas |
| — | DF | CZE | Martin Sot |

For recent transfers, see List of Slovak football transfers summer 2024.

== Staff ==
=== Current technical staff ===
As of 11 June 2023

| Staff | Job title |
|---|---|
| (Slovakia) Marek Petruš | Manager |
| (Slovakia) Adrián Drígeľ | Assistant coach |
| (Slovakia) Vladimír Vasylyev | Assistant coach |
| (Slovakia) Ľubomír Belan | Team Leader |
| (Slovakia) Branislav Benko | Goalkeeper coach |
| (Slovakia) Vlastimil Kapcát | Team doctor |
| (Slovakia) Jaroslav Južanin | Team doctor |
| (Slovakia) Michal Kališ | Masseur |

=== Club officials ===
| Position | Name |
|---|---|
| President | (Slovakia) Milan Mikušiak |
| Vice president | (Slovakia) Peter Hruška |
| Vice president | (Slovakia) Miloš Rojček |
| Sports director | (Slovakia) Lukáš Bielák |

== Notable players ==
The following former or current notable players had international caps for their respective countries. Players whose name is listed in bold represented their countries while playing for Tatran Liptovský Mikuláš.

- (Czech Republic) Robin Hranáč
- (Slovakia) Erik Jendrišek
- (Slovakia) Dávid Krčík
- (Slovakia) Tomáš Malec
- (Slovakia) Martin Polaček

== Managerial history ==
- (Slovakia) Ján Karaffa (−2013)
- (Slovakia) Roman Vavrovič (2013)
- (Slovakia) Jozef Škrlík (2013)
- (Slovakia) Vladimír Goffa (2013–2014)
- (Slovakia) Karol Praženica (2015)
- (Slovakia) Juraj Sabol (2015)
- (Slovakia) Anton Šoltis (2015)
- (Slovakia) Jozef Kostelník (2015-2016)
- (Slovakia) Juraj Sabol (2016)
- (Slovakia) Jozef Majoroš (2016–2017)
- (Slovakia) Jozef Šino (2017)
- (Slovakia) Jozef Kukulský (2017-2018)
- (Slovakia) Štefan Zaťko (2019–2020)
- (Slovakia) Marek Petruš (2020– June 2022)
- (Slovakia) Jozef Kostelník (June 2022–Nov 2022)
- (Slovakia) Marek Fabuľa (Nov 2022-Feb 2023)
- (Slovakia) Ondrej Desiatnik (Feb 2023-May 2023)
- (Slovakia) Ján Haspra (June 2023-May 2024)
- (Slovakia) Ľubomír Reiter (May 2024-May 2025)
- (Slovakia) Marek Petruš (May 2025 -)
