= 2025–26 MFK Skalica season =

Skalica
2025–26 season
- Manager: David Oulehla (until 30 November 2025); Roman Hudec (from 1 December 2025)
- Stadium: Mestský štadión Skalica
- Slovak First Football League: 9th
- Slovak Cup: Round of 16
- Top goalscorer: League: Petr Pudhorocký (6); All: Petr Pudhorocký (7)
- Highest home attendance: 3,013 v Spartak Trnava (13 September 2025, Slovak First Football League)
- Lowest home attendance: 303 v Komárno (6 December 2025, Slovak First Football League)
- Average home league attendance: 802
- Biggest win: 7–0 v Družstevník Hlboké (Away, 27 August 2025, Slovak Cup)
- Biggest defeat: 0–4 v Spartak Trnava (Home, 13 September 2025, Slovak First Football League)
Home colours	Away colours

The 2025–26 season was Mestský futbalový klub Skalica's 4th consecutive season in the Slovak First Football League. In addition to the domestic league, Skalica participated in the Slovak Cup.

On 30 November 2025, Skalica dismissed manager David Oulehla and assistant manager Kevin Absolon following a run of poor results that left the club in the relegation play-off position in the league. The following day, the club appointed Roman Hudec as his successor, with the former Skalica assistant returning to lead the team in its fight against relegation.

== Squad ==
Squad at end of season

Note: Flags indicate national team as defined under FIFA eligibility rules; some limited exceptions apply. Players may hold more than one non-FIFA nationality.

No.	Pos.	Nation	Player
1	GK	SVK	Michal Hornáček
2	DF	SVK	Lukáš Šimko
3	DF	SVK	Martin Černek
4	DF	GER	Maurizio Macorig
5	DF	SVK	Michal Ranko
7	FW	NGA	Philip Onyedika
9	MF	SVK	Adam Morong
11	DF	SVK	Lukáš Fabiš
13	DF	SVK	Samuel Suľa
14	MF	SVK	Michal Gulíšek
17	MF	CZE	Petr Pudhorocký (on loan from (Czech Republic) Hradec Králové)
18	MF	SVK	Martin Nagy (Captain)
19	MF	SVK	Martin Mášik
20	DF	SVK	Oliver Podhorín
21	MF	SVK	Adam Ravas

No.	Pos.	Nation	Player
22	GK	SVK	Šimon Beňa
22	MF	SVK	Mário Hollý
23	DF	CRO	Mario Šuver
24	MF	CZE	Tomáš Smejkal
25	MF	SVK	Adam Gaži
27	MF	SVK	Damián Bariš
29	DF	SVK	Marek Ujlaky (on loan from Spartak Trnava)
30	MF	NGA	Abbati Abdullahi (on loan from (Poland) Górnik Zabrze)
33	GK	SVK	Erik Riška
39	GK	SVK	Martin Junas
45	DF	CTA	Peter Guinari
71	MF	SVK	Lukáš Leginus
77	MF	CZE	Erik Daniel
88	DF	SVK	Branislav Niňaj (on loan from Podbrezová)
91	FW	CZE	Roman Potočný

== Transfers ==
=== Summer ===
In: Note: Flags indicate national team as defined under FIFA eligibility rules; some limited exceptions apply. Players may hold more than one non-FIFA nationality.

No.	Pos.	Nation	Player
—	MF	CZE	Erik Daniel (from FC Spartak Trnava)
―	MF	SVK	Damián Bariš (to AS Trenčín)
17	MF	CZE	Petr Pudhorocký (on loan from (Czech Republic) Hradec Králové)

Out: Note: Flags indicate national team as defined under FIFA eligibility rules; some limited exceptions apply. Players may hold more than one non-FIFA nationality.

No.	Pos.	Nation	Player
—	GK	SVK	Lukáš Hroššo (Released and joined Dukla Banská Bystrica)
—	DF	SVK	Adam Krčík (to KFC Komárno)
—	MF	SVK	Ján Vlasko (Released)
—	MF	CZE	Róbert Matejov (Released)
—	FW	AUT	Alex Sobczyk (Released)

=== Winter ===
In: Note: Flags indicate national team as defined under FIFA eligibility rules; some limited exceptions apply. Players may hold more than one non-FIFA nationality.

No.	Pos.	Nation	Player
—	DF	SVK	Branislav Niňaj (on loan from FK Železiarne Podbrezová)
—	DF	SVK	Lukáš Fabiš (from MFK Košice)
—	MF	NGA	Abbati Abdullahi (on loan from (Poland) Górnik Zabrze)
—	FW	NGA	Philip Onyedika (from (Czech Republic) FK Viktoria Žižkov)
—	DF	SVK	Marek Ujlaky (on loan from Spartak Trnava)

Out: Note: Flags indicate national team as defined under FIFA eligibility rules; some limited exceptions apply. Players may hold more than one non-FIFA nationality.

No.	Pos.	Nation	Player
—	FW	SVK	Marek Fábry (to Dynamo Malženice)
—	FW	GER	Sean Seitz (to (Germany) SV Eintracht Trier 05)
—	FW	SVK	Marek Švec (to (Austria) FC Hertha Wels)

== Competitions ==
=== Overview ===
Competition	First match	Last match	Starting round	Final position	Record							
Competition	First match	Last match	Starting round	Final position	Pld	W	D	L	GF	GA	GD	Win %
Slovak First Football League	27 July 2025	16 May 2026	Matchday 1	9th	32	9	8	15	34	45	−11	28.13
Slovak Cup	27 August 2025	25 November 2025	Second round	Round of 16	4	3	0	1	12	4	+8	75.00
Total					36	12	8	16	46	49	−3	33.33

Source: Competitions

=== Slovak First Football League ===
==== Regular season ====
===== League table =====
Pos	Team	Pld	W	D	L	GF	GA	GD	Pts	Qualification
7	Ružomberok	22	6	7	9	24	34	−10	25	Qualification for the relegation group
8	Trenčín	22	7	3	12	18	37	−19	24 (Note: Ranked by head-to-head points: Trenčín 6, Košice 0.)	Qualification for the relegation group
9	Košice	22	7	3	12	35	42	−7	24	Qualification for the relegation group
10	Komárno	22	5	7	10	24	34	−10	22	Qualification for the relegation group
11	Tatran Prešov	22	4	9	9	22	35	−13	21	Qualification for the relegation group
12	Skalica	22	3	7	12	20	35	−15	16	Qualification for the relegation group

Source: Niké liga (in Slovak)
Rules for classification: 1) Points; 2) Head-to-head points; 3) Head-to-head goal difference; 4) Head-to-head away goals scored; 5) Play-off.

===== Results summary =====
Overall								Home						Away					
Pld	W	D	L	GF	GA	GD	Pts	W	D	L	GF	GA	GD	W	D	L	GF	GA	GD
22	3	7	12	20	35	−15	16	2	6	3	9	13	−4	1	1	9	11	22	−11

Source: Niké liga

===== Results by round =====
Round	1	2	3	4	5	6	7	8	9	10	11	12	13	14	15	16	17	18	19	20	21	22
Ground	H	A	H	A	H	A	H	H	A	H	A	A	H	A	H	A	H	A	A	H	A	H
Result	D	W	D	L	D	L	L	W	L	D	D	L	D	L	L	L	D	L	L	W	L	L
Position	8	5	6	8	8	8	9	8	9	9	9	11	10	11	11	11	11	12	12	12	12	12
Points	1	4	5	5	6	6	6	9	9	10	11	11	12	12	12	12	13	13	13	16	16	16

Source: Worldfootball
A = Away; H = Home; W = Win; D = Draw; L = Loss

===== Matches =====
27 July 2025 1	Skalica	0–0	Žilina	Skalica
17:00 CEST (UTC+2)	Junas (yellow card) 62'	Report	Prokop (yellow card) 1'; Narimanidze (yellow card) 56'; Kaša (yellow card) 88'	Stadium: Mestský štadión Skalica; Attendance: 613; Referee: Bálint Kišš; Assistant referees: František Ferenc, Matej Hrebeňár

9 August 2025 3	Skalica	2–2	Podbrezová	Skalica
18:00 CEST (UTC+2)	Mášik (yellow card) 40'; Morong 56'; Smejka (yellow card) 62'; Švec 63'	Report	Šiler (yellow card) 21'; Deml 45+1'; Mielke (red card) 83'; Kujabi (yellow card) 87', (goal) 90+3'	Stadium: Mestský štadión Skalica; Attendance: 543; Referee: Boris Benedik; Assistant referees: Tomáš Straka, Patrik Kmec

12 August 2025 2	Ružomberok	1–3	Skalica	Ružomberok
18:00 CEST (UTC+2)	Köstl (yellow card) 5', (goal) 79'; Šašinka (yellow card) 68'	Report	Podhorín (yellow card) 13'; Pudhorocký 57'; Šulek 65' (o.g.); Hollý 87'; Nagy (yellow card) 90'; Černek (yellow card) 90'	Stadium: Štadión pod Čebraťom; Attendance: 1,055; Referee: Ivan Kružliak; Assistant referees: Branislav Hancko, Ján Pozor

16 August 2025 4	Slovan Bratislava	1–0	Skalica	Bratislava
18:00 CEST (UTC+2)	Ihnatenko 43'	Report	Šimko (yellow card) 42'; Černek (yellow card) 65'	Stadium: Tehelné pole Attendance: 4,868; Referee: Lukáš Dzivjak; Assistant referees: Dávid Bobko, Juraj Halíček

23 August 2025 5	Skalica	2–2	Tatran Prešov	Skalica
18:00 CEST (UTC+2)	Simon 23' (o.g.); Černek (yellow card) 33'; Fábry 65'; Šimko (yellow card) 90'	Report	Míka (yellow card) 47'; Sipľak (yellow card) 61'; Šimko (yellow card) 67'; Sagna 72', 77'	Stadium: Mestský štadión Skalica; Attendance: 737; Referee: Igor Valent; Assistant referees: Adam Jekkel, Andrej Hrmo

30 August 2025 6	Komárno	1–0	Skalica	Zlaté Moravce
18:00 CEST (UTC+2)	Šimko (yellow card) 14'; Boďa (yellow card) 17'; Mashike 58'; Špiriak (yellow card) 73'; Žák (yellow card) 76'	Report	Bariš (yellow card) 15'; Smejkal (yellow card) 60'; Švec (yellow card) 73'; Gaži (yellow card) 90'	Stadium: ViOn Aréna; Attendance: 322; Referee: Boris Benedik; Assistant referees: Tobiáš Pacák, Rastislav Kuba

13 September 2025 7	Skalica	0–4	Spartak Trnava	Skalica
18:00 CEST (UTC+2)	Podhorín (red card) 3'; Pudhorocký (yellow card) 35'; Černek (yellow card) 74'	Report	Azango 13'; Taiwo 29'; Moistsrapishvili (yellow card) 49'; Procházka 82' (pen.); Ďuriš 86'	Stadium: Mestský štadión Skalica; Attendance: 3,013; Referee: Matej Choreň; Assistant referees: Peter Bednár, Martin Vitko

20 September 2025 8	Skalica	1–0	Košice	Skalica
18:00 CEST (UTC+2)	Daniel 39'; Pudhorocký (yellow card) 54'	Report	Jakúbek (yellow card) 27'; Krivák (yellow card) 44'; Metu (yellow card) 45'; Gallovič (yellow card) 51'; Rehuš (yellow card) 76'	Stadium: Mestský štadión Skalica; Attendance: 623; Referee: Peter Ziemba; Assistant referees: Dušan Štofik, Peter Čajka

27 September 2025 9	Zemplín Michalovce	2–0	Skalica	Michalovce
18:00 CEST (UTC+2)	Brosnan 23'; Taylor-Hart 32'; Bahi (yellow card) 89'	Report		Stadium: Mestský futbalový štadión Attendance: 1,173; Referee: Boris Marhefka; Assistant referees: Martin Vitko, Patrik Kmec

5 October 2025 10	Skalica	1–1	DAC Dunajská Streda	Skalica
17:00 CEST (UTC+2)	Šimko (yellow card) 59'; Bariš 63' (pen.); Guinari (red card) 69'; Gaži (yellow card) 90+2'; Daniel (yellow card) 90+2'; Junas (yellow card) 90+5'	Report	Modesto (yellow card) 1'; Đukanović 71' (pen.)	Stadium: Mestský štadión Skalica; Attendance: 661; Referee: Marián Ruc; Assistant referees: Matej Zemko, Tomáš Straka

18 October 2025 11	Trenčín	1–1	Skalica	Trenčín
15:30 CEST (UTC+2)	Skovajsa 83'	Report	Daniel (yellow card) 71'; Morong 72'; Suľa (yellow card) 90+7'; Junas (yellow card) 90+8'	Stadium: Štadión Sihoť; Attendance: 1,015; Referee: Peter Kráľovič; Assistant referees: Milan Štrbo, Mário Roszbeck

25 October 2025 12	Žilina	3–2	Skalica	Žilina
15:30 CEST (UTC+2)	Faško 21', 67' (pen.); Ďatko 26'; Pališčák (yellow card) 41'; Kaša (yellow card) 76'; Prokop (yellow card) 79'	Report	Švec (yellow card) 21', (goal) 25', 62'; Černek (yellow card) 66'; Šimko (yellow card) 82'	Stadium: Štadión pod Dubňom; Attendance: 1,423; Referee: Bálint Kišš; Assistant referees: Simeon Vass, Peter Čajka

1 November 2025 13	Skalica	0–0	Ružomberok	Skalica
15:30 CET (UTC+1)		Report		Stadium: Mestský štadión Skalica; Attendance: 473; Referee: Boris Benedik; Assistant referees: Tobiáš Pacák, Matej Hrebeňár

8 November 2025 14	Podbrezová	2–0	Skalica	Podbrezová
15:30 CET (UTC+1)	Marković 65'; Mielke (yellow card) 67'; Luka (yellow card) 71'; Kováčik 79'	Report	Podhorín (yellow card) 79'; Gaži (red card) 87'; Junas (yellow card) 90'	Stadium: ZELPO Aréna; Attendance: 502; Referee: Filip Malárik; Assistant referees: Peter Bednár, Juraj Halíček

22 November 2025 15	Skalica	0–1	Slovan Bratislava	Skalica
15:30 CET (UTC+1)		Report	Cruz (yellow card) 34'; Šporar 42'	Stadium: Mestský štadión Skalica; Attendance: 1,027; Referee: Erik Gemzický; Assistant referees: Tomáš Vorel, Martin Vitko

29 November 2025 16	Tatran Prešov	3–2	Skalica	Prešov
15:30 CET (UTC+1)	Regáli 6', 27', (yellow card) 22' (yellow-red card) 63'; Kotula (yellow card) 18'; Masaryk 53'	Report	Pudhorocký (yellow card) 22', (goal) 85'; Smejkal 38'	Stadium: Futbal Tatran Arena; Attendance: 5,356; Referee: Boris Marhefka; Assistant referees: Andrej Hrmo, Peter Čajka

6 December 2025 17	Skalica	1–1	Komárno	Skalica
15:30 CET (UTC+1)	Morong (yellow card) 20'; Suľa 28'; Daniel (yellow card) 90+2'	Report	Németh (yellow card) 20'; Špiriak (yellow card) 51'; Tamás (yellow card) 67'; Šmehyl (yellow card) 76', (goal) 90+3' (pen.)	Stadium: Mestský štadión Skalica; Attendance: 303; Referee: Martin Dohál; Assistant referees: Peter Bednár, Matej Zemko

13 December 2025 18	Spartak Trnava	2–0	Skalica	Trnava
15:30 CET (UTC+1)	Khorkheli 41'; Metsoko 45'	Report	Gaži (yellow card) 16'; Mášik (yellow card) 32'; Potočný (yellow card) 37'	Stadium: Anton Malatinský Stadium; Attendance: 2,964; Referee: Filip Glova; Assistant referees: Dávid Bobko, Simeon Vass

7 February 2026 19	Košice	3–1	Skalica	Košice
15:30 CET (UTC+1)	Kovács 10'; Rehuš 34'; Čerepkai 71' (pen.); Perišić (yellow card) 90'	Report	Bariš (yellow card) 56'; Potočný 77' (pen.); Hollý (yellow card) 84' (yellow-red card) 84'	Stadium: Košická futbalová aréna Attendance: 2,847; Referee: Ivan Kružliak; Assistant referees: Branislav Hancko, Ján Pozor

14 February 2026 20	Skalica	2–1	Zemplín Michalovce	Skalica
15:30 CET (UTC+1)	Potočný 14', (yellow card) 28' (yellow-red card) 58'; Šuver (yellow card) 35'; Pudhorocký 47'; Mášik (yellow card) 86'	Report	Zubairu (yellow card) 13'; Danek 67'; Cottrell (yellow card) 90'	Stadium: Mestský štadión Skalica; Attendance: 312; Referee: Filip Glova; Assistant referees: František Ferenc, Dávid Bobko

21 February 2026 21	DAC Dunajská Streda	3–2	Skalica	Dunajská Streda
15:30 CET (UTC+1)	Ramadan 6', 9', 13', (yellow card) 90+2'	Report	Smejkal 75'; Ravas 89'	Stadium: MOL Aréna; Attendance: 3,515; Referee: Boris Benedik; Assistant referees: Pavel Jánošík, Patrik Kmec

28 February 2026 22	Skalica	0–1	Trenčín	Skalica
15:30 CET (UTC+1)	Ujlaky (yellow card) 56' (yellow-red card) 66'	Report	Soares 11' (pen.); Adyrbekov (yellow card) 44'; Križan (yellow card) 57'; Katić (yellow card) 85'	Stadium: Mestský štadión Skalica; Attendance: 445; Referee: Michal Očenáš; Assistant referees: Tomáš Straka, Juraj Halíček

==== Relegation group ====
===== League table =====
Pos	Team	Pld	W	D	L	GF	GA	GD	Pts	Qualification or relegation	KOŠ	TRE	SKA	RUŽ	KOM	TAT
7	Košice	32	13	4	15	51	55	−4	43		—	2–0	2–0	3–1	2–1	2–1
8	Trenčín	32	13	3	16	34	51	−17	42		3–0	—	2–1	3–1	1–2	1–0
9	Skalica	32	9	8	15	34	45	−11	35		3–1	4–1	—	1–0	2–1	1–0
10	Ružomberok	32	8	11	13	34	50	−16	35		1–1	4–3	0–0	—	2–1	1–1
11	Komárno (O)	32	8	8	16	34	46	−12	32	Qualification for the relegation play-offs	1–2	0–1	0–2	3–0	—	1–0
12	Tatran Prešov (R)	32	6	12	14	29	43	−14	30	Relegation to the 2. Liga	2–1	0–1	3–0	0–0	0–0	—

Source: Niké liga (in Slovak)
Rules for classification: 1) Points; 2) Points in regular season; 3) Head-to-head points in regular season; 4) Head-to-head goal difference in regular season; 5) Head-to-head goals scored in regular season; 6) Head-to-head away goals scored in regular season (if two teams tied); 7) Goal difference; 8) Goals scored; 9) Fair play ranking; 10) Drawing of lots.
(O) Play-off winners; (R) Relegated

===== Results summary =====
Overall								Home						Away					
Pld	W	D	L	GF	GA	GD	Pts	W	D	L	GF	GA	GD	W	D	L	GF	GA	GD
10	6	1	3	14	10	+4	19	5	0	0	11	3	+8	1	1	3	3	7	−4

Source: Worldfootball

===== Results by round =====
Round	23	24	25	26	27	28	29	30	31	32
Ground	H	A	H	A	A	H	A	H	A	H
Result	W	L	W	L	D	W	W	W	L	W
Position	12	12	11	12	11	11	10	9	10	9
Points	19	19	22	22	23	26	29	32	32	35

Source: Worldfootball
A = Away; H = Home; W = Win; D = Draw; L = Loss

===== Matches =====
7 March 2026 23	Skalica	1–0	Tatran Prešov	Skalica
15:30 CET (UTC+1)	Daniel 24'; Suľa (yellow card) 76'	Report	Masaryk (yellow card) 51'; Regáli (yellow card) 76'; Olejník (yellow card) 90'	Stadium: Mestský štadión Skalica; Attendance: 402; Referee: Ivan Kružliak; Assistant referees: Ján Pozor, Ákos Juhos

15 March 2026 24	Trenčín	2–1	Skalica	Trenčín
15:30 CET (UTC+1)	Soares (yellow card) 5'; Slavíček (yellow card) 5'; Mikulaj 41'; Brandis 69'; Pavek (yellow card) 85'	Report	Niňaj (yellow card) 63'; Ujlaky (yellow card) 72', (goal) 86'; Onyedika (yellow card) 90'; Leginus (yellow card) 90'	Stadium: Štadión Sihoť; Attendance: 1,012; Referee: Boris Benedik; Assistant referees: Dušan Štofik, Matej Hrebeňár

22 March 2026 25	Skalica	2–1	Komárno	Skalica
15:30 CET (UTC+1)	Potočný 31', (yellow card) 52'; Leginus 62'	Report	Kiss 85'; Bayemi (yellow card) 90'	Stadium: Mestský štadión Skalica; Attendance: 457; Referee: Michal Smolák; Assistant referees: Tomáš Straka, Martin Vitko

4 April 2026 26	Košice	2–0	Skalica	Košice
15:30 CEST (UTC+2)	Rehuš 26', 40'; Madleňák (yellow card) 47'; Krivák (yellow card) 78'	Report	Smejkal (yellow card) 39'; Gaži (yellow card) 84'	Stadium: Košická futbalová aréna Attendance: 2,869; Referee: Erik Gemzický; Assistant referees: Milan Štrbo, Ákos Juhos

11 April 2026 27	Ružomberok	0–0	Skalica	Ružomberok
15:30 CEST (UTC+2)		Report	Nagy (yellow card) 54'	Stadium: Štadión pod Čebraťom; Attendance: 778; Referee: Peter Kráľovič; Assistant referees: Tomáš Straka, Mário Roszbeck

19 April 2026 28	Skalica	4–1	Trenčín	Skalica
15:30 CEST (UTC+2)	Bariš 19', (yellow card) 71'; Pudhorocký 26', 74'; Daniel 50'; Ujlaky (yellow card) 68'; Morong (yellow card) 90'	Report	David 30'; Poom (yellow card) 34'; Goss (yellow card) 45'	Stadium: Mestský štadión Skalica; Attendance: 439; Referee: Michal Smolák; Assistant referees: Ján Pozor, Ákos Juhos

25 April 2026 29	Komárno	0–2	Skalica	Zlaté Moravce
18:00 CEST (UTC+2)	Šmehyl (yellow card) 18'; Szűcs (yellow card) 52'; Šimko (yellow card) 64'; Ožvolda (yellow card) 72'; Žák (yellow card) 75'	Report	Pudhorocký 30' (pen.), (yellow card) 88'; Morong (yellow card) 50'; Abdullahi (yellow card) 70'; Ujlaky (yellow card) 75'; Bariš (yellow card) 77'; Onyedika 90+4'	Stadium: ViOn Aréna; Attendance: 342; Referee: Ivan Kružliak; Assistant referees: Branislav Hancko, Tomáš Straka

5 May 2026 30	Skalica	3–1	Košice	Skalica
18:00 CEST (UTC+2)	Šuver 29'; Daniel (yellow card) 65', (goal) 67'; Šimko 90+4'	Report	Čerepkai 68'	Stadium: Mestský štadión Skalica; Attendance: 1,650; Referee: Boris Marhefka; Assistant referees: Andrej Hrmo, Rastislav Kuba

9 May 2026 31	Tatran Prešov	3–0	Skalica	Prešov
20:30 CEST (UTC+2)	Regáli 27'; Bernát 32'; Barbosa 47'; Medveděv (yellow card) 60'; Bajza (yellow card) 89'	Report	Mášik (yellow card) 54'; Onyedika (yellow card) 57'; Daniel (yellow card) 88'	Stadium: Futbal Tatran Arena; Attendance: 5,525; Referee: Erik Gemzický; Assistant referees: Adam Jekkel, Daniel Poláček

16 May 2026 32	Skalica	1–0	Ružomberok	Skalica
17:00 CEST (UTC+2)	Šimko 76'	Report	Jevoš (yellow card) 73'; Murgaš (yellow card) 77'; Luterán (yellow card) 85'	Stadium: Mestský štadión Skalica; Attendance: 1,130; Referee: Michal Smolák; Assistant referees: František Ferenc, Tobiáš Pacák

=== Slovak Cup ===
27 August 2025 Second round	Družstevník Hlboké	0–7	Skalica	Hlboké
17:00 CEST (UTC+2)	Pavlík (yellow card) 27'; Mráz (yellow card) 90'	Report	Černek 6'; Nagy 29'; Gulíšek 58'; Bariš 66'; Šuver 70'; Smejkal 85'; Švec 90'	Attendance: 830; Referee: Martin Dohál; Assistant referees: Martin Vitko, Denis Poruban

8 October 2025 Third round	Spartak Myjava	1–2	Skalica	Myjava
18:00 CEST (UTC+2)	Halabrín (yellow card) 17'; Martišiak 48'; Halabrín (yellow card) 89'	Report	Ravas 18', (yellow card) 75'; Pudhorocký 58'	Stadium: Stadium Myjava; Attendance: 367; Referee: Michal Smolák; Assistant referees: Róbert Šandrik, Milan Kardelis

11 November 2025 Fourth round	Inter Bratislava	0–2	Skalica	Bratislava
13:30 CET (UTC+1)	Djiby Ba (red card) 84'; Madubuegwu (yellow card) 85'; P. Sokol (yellow card) 90+3'; M. Sokol (yellow card) 90+4'; Mészáros (yellow card) 90+4'	Report	Seitz 12'; Černek (yellow card) 71'; Ravas (yellow card) 77'; Morong (yellow card) 85'; Mášik (yellow card) 85'; Gulíšek 90+3'	Stadium: Štadión Pasienky; Attendance: 208; Referee: Bálint Kišš; Assistant referees: František Ferenc, Milan Kardelis

25 November 2025 Round of 16	Žilina	3–1	Skalica	Žilina
15:30 CET (UTC+1)	Guinari 40' (o.g.); Hranica 57'; Lérant (yellow card) 81' (not on pitch); Prokop 90'	Report	Bariš (yellow card) 21'; Daniel 37'; Juračka (yellow card) 81' (not on pitch)	Stadium: Štadión pod Dubňom; Attendance: 582; Referee: Peter Ziemba; Assistant referees: Simeon Vass, Dávid Bobko; Fourth official: Jaroslav Sučka
