= 2023–24 Slovak First Football League =

Football league in Slovakia

Niké liga
- Season: 2023–24
- Dates: Regular season: 28 July 2023 – 18 May 2024
- Champions: Slovan Bratislava (22nd title)
- Relegated: Zlaté Moravce
- Champions League: Slovan Bratislava
- Europa League: Ružomberok
- Conference League: DAC 1904 Dunajská Streda; Spartak Trnava
- Matches: 126
- Goals: 356 (2.83 per match)
- Top goalscorer: Róbert Polievka (13); Tigran Barseghyan (13)
- Biggest home win: Podbrezová 5–0 MFK Ružomberok (21 October 2023)
- Biggest away win: Podbrezová 0-6 Slovan (9 December 2023)
- Highest scoring: MŠK Žilina 5–3 MFK Skalica (29 September 2023); Podbrezová 5–3 FC Košice (1 October 2023)
- Highest attendance: 12,528; Spartak Trnava 1-2 Slovan Bratislava (22 October 2023)
- Lowest attendance: 369; Skalica 3–0 Podbrezová (15 December 2023)
- Average attendance: ▲2,620

The 2023–24 Slovak First Football League (known as Niké liga for sponsorship reasons) is the 31st season of first-tier football league in Slovakia since its establishment in 1993.

The winners (Slovan Bratislava) qualified for the 2024–25 UEFA Champions League first qualifying round. The 2023–24 Slovak Cup winners (Ružomberok) qualified for the 2024–25 UEFA Europa League first qualifying round. The second and third-placed teams (DAC 1904 Dunajská Streda and Spartak Trnava) qualified for the 2024–25 UEFA Conference League second qualifying round. The eleventh-placed team (Zemplín Michalovce) qualified for the relegation play-offs. The bottom-placed team (Zlaté Moravce) were relegated to the 2024–25 2. Liga.

== Teams ==
The league consisted of twelve teams; the top eleven teams from the previous season, and one team promoted from the 2. Liga. Košice were promoted to the top flight (for the first time in their history) as champions of the 2022–23 2. Liga, replacing the 2022–23 Slovak First Football League bottom-placed team Tatran Liptovský Mikuláš (relegated after two seasons in the top flight). Slovan Bratislava entered the season as defending champions (for the fifth successive year).

=== Stadiums and locations ===
After more than six years, all teams in the league are once again playing their home matches in their respective stadiums. The last time this occurred was during the autumn part of the 2016–17 season.

Location of teams in Niké liga 2023–24

FC DAC 1904 Dunajská Streda	FK Dukla Banská Bystrica	FC Košice	FK Železiarne Podbrezová
MOL Aréna; UEFA	Štadión SNP; UEFA	Košická futbalová aréna UEFA	ZELPO Aréna; UEFA
Capacity: 12,700	Capacity: 7,030	Capacity: 12,555	Capacity: 4,000
MFK Ružomberok	MFK Skalica	ŠK Slovan Bratislava	FC Spartak Trnava
Štadión pod Čebraťom	Štadión MFK Skalica	Tehelné pole UEFA	Štadión Antona Malatinského; UEFA
Capacity: 4,876	Capacity: 2,600	Capacity: 22,500	Capacity: 18,200
AS Trenčín	MFK Zemplín Michalovce	FC ViOn Zlaté Moravce	MŠK Žilina
Štadión Sihoť; UEFA	Mestský futbalový štadión UEFA	ViOn Aréna; UEFA	Štadión pod Dubňom; UEFA
Capacity: 10,000	Capacity: 4,400	Capacity: 4,008	Capacity: 10,897

=== Personnel and kits ===
Team	President	Manager	Captain	Kit manufacturer	Shirt sponsor
DAC Dunajská Streda	(Slovakia) Oszkár Világi	(Spain) Xisco Muñoz	TBA	Macron	Kukkonia
Dukla Banská Bystrica	(Slovakia) Ivan Šabo	(Slovakia) Mario Auxt (interim)	(Slovakia) Róbert Polievka	Adidas	Veolia
Košice	(Slovakia) Dušan Trnka	(Slovakia) Gergely Geri	(Slovakia) Erik Pačinda	Adidas	Niké
Podbrezová	(Slovakia) Július Kriváň	(Czech Republic) Roman Skuhravý	(Slovakia) Richard Ludha	Adidas	Niké
Ružomberok	(Slovakia) Ľubomír Golis	(Czech Republic) Ondřej Smetana	(Slovakia) Marek Zsigmund	Adidas	Niké
Skalica	(Slovakia) Peter Bartoš	(Slovakia) Pavol Majerník	(Slovakia) Martin Nagy	Puma	Tipsport
Slovan Bratislava	(Slovakia) Ivan Kmotrík	(Slovakia) Vladimír Weiss	(Slovakia) Vladimír Weiss	Adidas	Niké
Spartak Trnava	(Slovakia) Peter Macho	(Slovakia) Michal Gašparík	(Slovakia) Roman Procházka	Puma	Tipsport
Trenčín	(Slovakia) Róbert Rybníček	(Serbia) Ilija Stolica	(Slovakia) Damián Bariš	Macron	Tipsport
Zemplín Michalovce	(Slovakia) Ján Sabol	(Czech Republic) František Straka	(Slovakia) Igor Žofčák	Adidas	Tipsport, St. Nicolaus
Zlaté Moravce	(Slovakia) Karol Škula	(Czech Republic) Dušan Uhrin Jr.	(Slovakia) Karol Mondek	Erreà	Tipsport
Žilina	(Slovakia) Jozef Antošík	(Czech Republic) Michal Ščasný	(Slovakia) Tomáš Nemčík	Nike	Preto

=== Managerial changes ===
Team	Outgoing manager	Manner of departure	Date of vacancy	Position in table	Replaced by	Date of appointment
Trenčín	(Czech Republic) František Straka	End of contract	26 May 2023	Pre-season	(Serbia) Ilija Stolica	27 May 2023
Ružomberok	(Slovakia) Peter Struhár	End of contract	29 May 2023	Pre-season	(Slovakia) Peter Tomko	5 June 2023
Zlaté Moravce	(Slovakia) Ivan Galád	End of contract	5 June 2023	Pre-season	(Slovakia) Vladimír Cifranič	12 June 2023
Zemplín Michalovce	(Slovakia) Vladimír Rusnák	End of interim spell	20 June 2023	Pre-season	(Slovakia) Marek Petruš	21 June 2023
Zemplín Michalovce	(Slovakia) Marek Petruš	Sacked	26 September 2023	12th	(Slovakia) Peter Struhár	28 September 2023
Košice	(Slovakia) Anton Šoltis	Sacked	23 October 2023	10th	(Slovakia) Ján Kozák jr	31 October 2023
Ružomberok	(Slovakia) Peter Tomko	Sacked	24 October 2023	8th	(Czech Republic) Ondřej Smetana	24 October 2023
Banská Bystrica	(Czech Republic) Michal Ščasný	Signed with (Cyprus) Athienou	25 October 2023	5th	(Slovakia) Mario Auxt (interim)	25 October 2023
Zlaté Moravce	(Slovakia) Vladimír Cifranič	Sacked	12 November 2023	11th	(Slovakia) Michal Hipp	12 November 2023
Dunajská Streda	(Slovakia) Adrián Guľa	Sacked	17 November 2023	6th	(Spain) Xisco Muñoz	18 November 2023
Zemplín Michalovce	(Slovakia) Peter Struhár	Sacked	20 February 2024	11th	(Czech Republic) František Straka	20 February 2024
Zlaté Moravce	(Slovakia) Michal Hipp	Sacked	21 February 2024	12th	(Czech Republic) Dušan Uhrin Jr.	26 February 2024
MŠK Žilina	(Czech Republic) Jaroslav Hynek	Released	11 April 2024	4th	(Czech Republic) Michal Ščasný	11 April 2023
Košice	(Slovakia) Ján Kozák jr	Released	13 May 2024	11th	(Slovakia) Gergely Geri	13 May 2023

== Regular stage ==
=== League table ===
Pos	Team	Pld	W	D	L	GF	GA	GD	Pts	Qualification
1	Slovan Bratislava	22	18	3	1	57	16	+41	57	Qualification for the championship group
2	Žilina	22	12	5	5	40	30	+10	41	Qualification for the championship group
3	Spartak Trnava	22	12	3	7	31	22	+9	39	Qualification for the championship group
4	DAC Dunajská Streda	22	10	7	5	31	21	+10	37	Qualification for the championship group
5	Podbrezová	22	10	4	8	40	34	+6	34 (Note: Ranked on head-to-head points: Podbrezová 11, Ružomberok 9, Trenčín 8, Dukla Banská Bystrica 3.)	Qualification for the championship group
6	Ružomberok	22	9	7	6	28	31	−3	34	Qualification for the championship group
7	Trenčín	22	9	7	6	31	23	+8	34	Qualification for the relegation group
8	Dukla Banská Bystrica	22	9	7	6	38	30	+8	34	Qualification for the relegation group
9	Skalica	22	6	5	11	19	25	−6	23	Qualification for the relegation group
10	Košice	22	4	5	13	19	45	−26	17	Qualification for the relegation group
11	Zemplín Michalovce	22	1	7	14	19	42	−23	10	Qualification for the relegation group
12	Zlaté Moravce	22	0	4	18	14	48	−34	4	Qualification for the relegation group

Source: Niké liga (in Slovak)
Rules for classification: 1) Points; 2) Head-to-head points; 3) Head-to-head goal difference; 4) Head-to-head away goals scored; 5) Play-off.

=== Results ===
Each team plays home-and-away against every other team in the league, for a total of 22 matches each.

Home \ Away	DAC	DUK	KOŠ	POD	RUŽ	SKA	SLO	TRN	TRE	ZMI	ZLM	ŽIL
DAC Dunajská Streda		1–2	5–2	3–2	1–1	1–0	3–1	0–1	0–0	2–1	3–0	1–1
Dukla Banská Bystrica	0–0		1–1	1–4	1–1	2–1	1–4	1–2	1–1	3–1	1–1	3–1
Košice	0–3	2–4		0–0	2–2	2–1	0–0	0–2	0–3	2–1	1–0	0–3
Podbrezová	0–0	2–2	5–3		5–0	1–0	0–6	1–2	2–2	2–1	1–0	2–0
Ružomberok	1–1	2–1	1–0	2–1		2–1	1–2	1–0	1–0	0–0	2–0	0–2
Skalica	0–1	0–3	1–0	3–0	1–0		1–2	0–0	0–0	2–1	2–0	1–1
Slovan Bratislava	2–1	2–2	4–0	3–2	2–2	1–0		2–0	2–0	5–1	4–1	2–0
Spartak Trnava	1–2	2–0	3–0	2–0	2–2	2–0	1–2		1–2	1–0	1–0	0–2
Trenčín	1–0	1–0	4–1	1–2	4–1	0–0	0–2	2–3		2–0	4–1	0–0
Zemplín Michalovce	0–0	0–3	0–2	1–5	0–1	1–1	0–2	3–4	0–0		4–1	1–1
Zlaté Moravce	0–2	0–2	1–1	0–2	2–4	0–1	0–3	1–1	1–2	2–2		1–2
Žilina	5–1	1–4	1–0	2–1	3–1	5–3	0–4	1–0	5–2	1–1	3–2	

Source: Niké liga (in Slovak)
Legend: Blue = home team win; Yellow = draw; Red = away team win.

== Championship group ==
Pos	Team	Pld	W	D	L	GF	GA	GD	Pts	Qualification	SLO	DAC	TRN	ŽIL	RUŽ	POD
1	Slovan Bratislava (C)	32	23	4	5	76	31	+45	73	Qualification for the Champions League first qualifying round	—	0–0	0–2	2–3	5–1	2–1
2	DAC Dunajská Streda	32	16	10	6	49	32	+17	58	Qualification for the Conference League second qualifying round	5–3	—	1–0	2–1	0–0	3–1
3	Spartak Trnava	32	18	3	11	47	29	+18	57	Qualification for the Conference League second qualifying round	1–2	3–0	—	1–0	1–0	5–0
4	Žilina	32	16	7	9	54	45	+9	55		0–3	2–3	2–0	—	0–0	3–2
5	Ružomberok	32	12	11	9	38	43	−5	47	Qualification for the Europa League first qualifying round (Note: Ružomberok qualified for the Europa League first qualifying round by winning the 2023–24 Slovak Cup.)	0–1	1–1	2–1	1–1	—	3–2
6	Podbrezová	32	11	4	17	49	60	−11	37		2–1	0–3	0–2	1–2	0–2	—

Source: Niké liga (in Slovak)
Rules for classification: 1) Points; 2) Head-to-head points; 3) Head-to-head goal difference; 4) Head-to-head away goals scored; 5) Play-off.
(C) Champions

== Relegation group ==
Pos	Team	Pld	W	D	L	GF	GA	GD	Pts	Qualification or relegation	DUK	TRE	SKA	KOŠ	ZMI	ZLM
1	Dukla Banská Bystrica	32	14	9	9	50	41	+9	51		—	4–2	2–2	2–1	0–1	0–0
2	Trenčín	32	13	10	9	48	34	+14	49		2–0	—	1–3	1–2	1–0	4–0
3	Skalica	32	11	7	14	35	38	−3	40		1–2	0–4	—	1–0	0–0	4–1
4	Košice	32	7	6	19	27	56	−29	27 (Note: Head-to-head points: Košice – 9, Zemplín Michalovce – 3.)		0–1	0–0	1–2	—	2–0	0–2
5	Zemplín Michalovce (O)	32	6	9	17	29	48	−19	27	Qualification for the relegation play-offs	2–0	0–0	1–3	1–0	—	3–0
6	Zlaté Moravce (R)	32	2	6	24	21	66	−45	12	Relegation to the 2. Liga	0–1	2–2	1–0	1–2	0–2	—

Source: Niké liga (in Slovak)
Rules for classification: 1) Points; 2) Head-to-head points; 3) Head-to-head goal difference; 4) Head-to-head away goals scored; 5) Play-off.
(O) Play-off winners; (R) Relegated

== Relegation play-offs ==
The team which finished 11th faced the 2nd team from 2. Liga for one spot in the top flight in the next season.

1st leg

21 May 2024
17:30 CEST (UTC+02:00)

Petržalka	2–1	Zemplín Michalovce
Begala 21'; Gašparovič 45+2'	Report	Žofčák 40'

Tehelné pole, Bratislava
Attendance: 3,898
Referee: Erik Gemzický

2nd leg

25 May 2024
16:30 CEST (UTC+02:00)

Zemplín Michalovce	2–0	Petržalka
Halouska 9' (o.g.); Arevalo 32'	Report

Mestský futbalový štadión, Michalovce
Attendance: 2,986
Referee: Peter Kráľovič

== Season statistics ==
=== Top goalscorers ===
As of 18 May 2024

Rank	Player	Club	Goals
1	(Slovakia) Róbert Polievka	Banská Bystrica	13
1	(Armenia) Tigran Barseghyan	Slovan	13
3	(Slovakia) Martin Rymarenko	Banská Bystrica	12
3	(Slovakia) Matej Trusa	D.Streda	12
5	(Slovakia) David Strelec	Slovan	11
6	(Slovakia) Matúš Marcin	Michalovce	10
6	(Slovakia) Nino Marcelli	Slovan	10
6	(Slovakia) Michal Ďuriš	Trnava	10
6	(Serbia) Njegoš Kupusović	Trenčín	10
10	(Serbia) Aleksandar Čavrić	Slovan	9
10	(Slovenia) Žan Medved	Košice	9
10	(Slovakia) Dávid Ďuriš	Žilina	9
10	(Croatia) Marko Tolić	Slovan	9

==== Hat-tricks ====
Round	Player	For	Against	Result	Date	Ref
1	(Slovakia) Peter Kováčik	Podbrezová	Banská Bystrica	4–1 (A)	28 July 2023	
7 P.O	(Slovakia) Matej Trusa	Dunajská Streda	Slovan	5–3 (H)	28 April 2024	
10 P.O	(Slovakia) Matej Trusa	Dunajská Streda	Žilina	2–3 (A)	18 May 2024	

Note

^{4} Player scored 4 goals

=== Clean sheets ===
As of 18 May 2024

Rank	Player	Club	Clean sheets
1	(Slovakia) Dominik Takáč	Trnava	14
2	(Cape Verde) Vozinha	Trenčín	13
2	(Serbia) Aleksandar Popović	Dunajská Streda	13
4	(Canada) Milan Borjan	Slovan	12
5	(Slovakia) Ľubomír Belko	Žilina	8
6	(Slovenia) Žiga Frelih	Michalovce	7
7	(Slovakia) Martin Junas	Skalica	6
7	(Slovakia) Matúš Hruška	Banská Bystrica	6
7	(Slovakia) Tomáš Frühwald	Ružomberok	6
10	(Slovakia) Richard Ludha	Podbrezová	5

=== Discipline ===
As of 18 May 2024

==== Player ====
- Most yellow cards: 10
  - (Slovakia) Boris Godál (B.Bystrica)
  - (Slovakia) René Paraj (Podbrezová)
- Most red cards: 2
  - (Slovakia) Mário Mrva (Podbrezová)
  - (Ukraine) Oleksandr Holikov (Košice)
  - (North Macedonia) Andrej Stojchevski (Žilina)

==== Club ====
- Most yellow cards: 68
  - MFK Skalica
- Most red cards: 5
  - Košice

== Awards ==
=== Annual awards ===
==== Team of the Season ====

Team of the Season was:

- Goalkeeper: (Slovakia) Dominik Takáč (Spartak Trnava)
- Defenders: (Slovakia) Matúš Kmeť (Trenčín), (Georgia (country)) Guram Kashia (Slovan Bratislava), (Slovenia) Kenan Bajrić (Slovan Bratislava), (Republic of the Congo) Yhoan Andzouana (DAC D.Streda)
- Midfielders: (Slovakia) Peter Kováčik (Podbrezová), (Slovakia) Juraj Kucka (Slovan Bratislava), (Slovenia) Adrian Zeljković (Spartak Trnava), (Armenia) Tigran Barseghyan (Slovan Bratislava)
- Forwards: (Slovakia) Róbert Polievka (Dukla Banská Bystrica), (Slovakia) Michal Ďuriš (Spartak Trnava)

==== Individual awards ====
Manager of the Season

(Slovakia) Vladimír Weiss (Slovan Bratislava)

Player of the Season

(Slovakia) Juraj Kucka (Slovan Bratislava)

Young Player of the Season

(Slovakia) Nino Marcelli (Slovan Bratislava)

== Attendances ==
#	Football club	Average attendance
1	Slovan Bratislava	5,783
2	DAC Dunajská Streda	5,713
3	Spartak Trnava	4,537
4	FC Košice	3,436
5	MŠK Žilina	1,860
6	AS Trenčín	1,787
7	Dukla Banská Bystrica	1,586
8	Železiarne Podbrezová	1,489
9	FC ViOn Zlaté Moravce	1,430
10	MFK Ružomberok	1,385
11	Zemplín Michalovce	1,175
12	MFK Skalica	1,156

== See also ==
- 2023–24 Slovak Cup
- 2023–24 2. Liga (Slovakia)
- List of Slovak football transfers summer 2023
- List of Slovak football transfers winter 2023–24
- List of foreign Slovak First League players
