= Marek Ujlaky (footballer, born 2003) =

Slovak youth international footballer

Personal information
- Date of birth: 3 December 2003 (age 22)
- Place of birth: Trnava, Slovakia
- Height: 1.85 m (6 ft 1 in)
- Position: Centre-back

Team information
- Current team: Spartak Trnava
- Number: 13

Youth career
- 2011–2017: ŠK Slávia Zeleneč
- 2017–2021: Spartak Trnava

Senior career*
Years	Team	Apps	(Gls)
2021–	Spartak Trnava	61	(1)
2026	→ Skalica (loan)	13	(1)

International career^{‡}
2021–2022	Slovakia U19	6	(0)
2022–2023	Slovakia U20	8	(0)
2023–	Slovakia U21	6	(1)
- * Club domestic league appearances and goals as of 21 November 2026 ‡ National team caps and goals as of 17 June 2025

Marek Ujlaky (born 3 December 2003) is a Slovak professional footballer who plays for Spartak Trnava as a centre back.

== Club career ==
=== Spartak Trnava ===
Ujlaky signed his first professional contract with Spartak Trnava in May 2021.

He made his Fortuna Liga debut for Spartak in a home fixture at Štadión Antona Malatinského on 10 April 2021 against ViOn Zlaté Moravce. He came on in the 88th minute to replace team captain Ján Vlasko with the score set at 2–0 following a first-half goal by Vlasko and a second-half own goal by Matej Moško. Ujlaky was immediately given the captain's armband. While on pitch, Saymon Cabral set the final score at 3-0 for Spartak.

In June 2022, Ujlaky signed his first professional contract with Spartak along with Patrick Karhan, whose father Miroslav played and managed Spartak, and collected over 100 caps for Slovakia. Both players were to succeed their fathers in their careers and serve as a motivation for other academy players of Spartak Trnava, according to club president Peter Macho.

Ujlaky was injured on August 27, 2025 in a Slovnaft Cup match against AC Nitra. From then on, he had been on a forced break and only returned to the field at the beginning of the 2026 winter preparations against Dynamo Malženice.

=== Loan to MFK Skalica ===
On 14 February 2026, after requesting a transfer, it was announced that Ujlaky would be joining fellow league outfit MFK Skalica on a half-year loan. He made his debut for Roman Hudec’s side the same day, coming on off the bench in the 70th minute for Tomáš Smejkal in a 2–1 win against MFK Zemplín Michalovce.

== International career ==
Ujlaky made his National debut for Slovakia U19 in a 1–0 loss to Italy U19. He was at the 2023 FIFA U-20 World Cup with the U20 team, where he would help the team advance from the group stage after a single win over Fiji. However, they subsequently lost to Colombia 5–1 in the knockout stage.

On 21 May 2025, Ujlaky was picked to be a part of the squad for Slovakia U21 ahead of the UEFA European Under-21 Championship held in Slovakia. He would not make an appearance and would only feature on the bench in all 3 group stage games.

== Personal life ==
Ujlaky is the son of Marek Ujlaky, a former Slovak international who played almost 400 league fixtures for Spartak Trnava.

== Honours ==
Spartak Trnava

- Slovak Cup: 2021–22, 2022–23, 2024–25
