= Martin Mášik =

Slovak footballer

Personal information
- Full name: Martin Mášik
- Date of birth: 8 January 1999 (age 27)
- Place of birth: Opoj, Slovakia
- Height: 1.78 m (5 ft 10 in)
- Position: Central midfielder

Team information
- Current team: Skalica
- Number: 19

Youth career
- –2016: Senica
- 2016–2017: Skalica

Senior career*
Years	Team	Apps	(Gls)
2018–	Skalica	206	(6)
- * Club domestic league appearances and goals as of 21 September 2026

Martin Mášik (born 8 January 1999) is a Slovak professional footballer who plays as a central midfielder for MFK Skalica in the Slovak league. He has played for Skalica since 2018.

== Club career ==
=== MFK Skalica ===
Mášik got his first start in the line-up for Skalica in a 3–0 win against ŠK Odeva Lipany in the 3rd round of the Slovak Cup.

Mášik made his professional league debut for MFK Skalica on 30 July 2022 in a 2–0 win against AS Trenčín, coming off the bench in the 90th minute for Martin Nagy. Mášik scored his first league goal in a 2–1 away win against MFK Ružomberok, scoring in the 8th minute. He was a part of the Skalica squad ahead of the 2023–24 Slovak First Football League season.

== Life ==
He was born in the village of Opoj in the Trnava Region, where he first started playing the sport.
