= Marek Ujlaky =

Marek Ujlaky may refer to:

- Marek Ujlaky (footballer, born 1974)
- Marek Ujlaky (footballer, born 2003)
