= Marek Švec =

Marek Švec may refer to:

- Marek Švec (wrestler)
- Marek Švec (footballer)
