= Mária Hollósyová =

Slovak embroiderer (1858–1945)

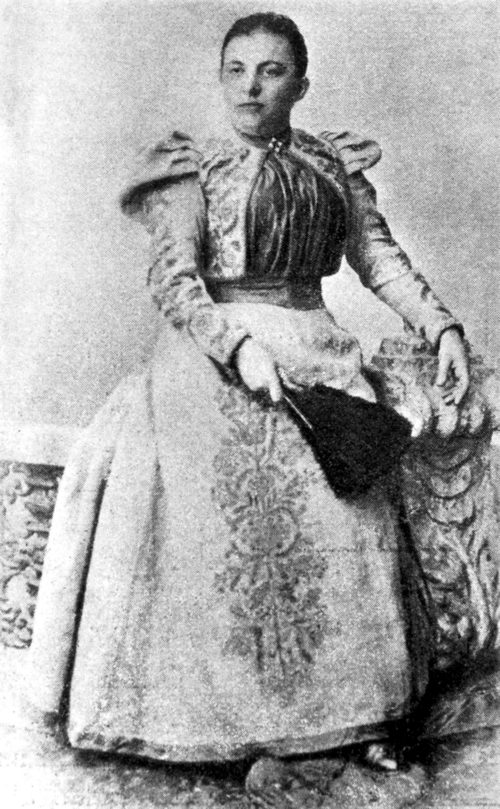
- Born: February 1, 1858; Opoj, Austrian Empire (now Slovakia)
- Died: April 15, 1945 (aged 87); Cífer, Czechoslovakia

Mária Hollósyová (1 February 1858 – 15 April 1945) was a Slovak civil servant, embroiderer and draftswoman, whose artistic works became known in Europe at the turn of the 19th and 20th centuries. She was the main designer and embroiderer of the Izabella association. She built a system of education in the embroidery school and, by improving techniques, brought embroidery to a high professional level. In 1891 she was awarded a silver medal in an exhibition in Komárno, in 1892 a gold medal in Trnava, in 1896 a silver medal in Budapest and in 1900 a silver medal in Paris.

== Life and career ==
She was born in 1858 in Opoj. She came from the Hollósy family of landowners. Her father was Ľudovít Hollósy and her mother was Mária Menyigádová. She studied at the School of Applied Arts in Budapest. In her youth, she experienced an unhappy love affair and broke up with her family and became independent. She never married. Until 1892, she worked as a postal clerk, then as a teacher and head of an embroidery workshop and school. She was also a collaborator of the Izabella association (1895–1918).

In 1888, while she was working at the post office in Križovany nad Dudváhom, her costumed dolls were noticed by Countess Majláthová and Šarlota Zičiová. Countess Zichyová requested Hollósyová's dolls for the Empress Elisabeth of Austria. Subsequently, Hollósyová exhibited the dolls at an exhibition in Pest, where they were a success. They also attracted the attention of the Hungarian Minister of Trade, Count Gabriel Baros. Hollósyová became the head of the embroidery school of the Izabella association in Cífer. The Cífer embroideries won awards at several domestic and European exhibitions and were presented at the aristocratic courts of Austria-Hungary, Spain, France and Belgium. In 1918, the Izabella association ceased to exist and its workshops came under the management of the Detva cooperative. Hollósyová therefore no longer worked on aristocratic and sacred commissions and replaced them with textiles of a more profane nature. She died of unknown circumstances in April 1945 in Cífer.

== Legacy ==
In 2000–2001, an exhibition was held at the Bratislava Castle, in connection with which a catalogue of Hollósyová's works was published. An embroidery competition in her honor is regularly held in Cífer, in 2024 the 7th year of the competition was held. In 2001, the municipal council awarded her honorary citizenship of the municipality of Cífer in memoriam.
