= Mario Šuver =

Croatian footballer

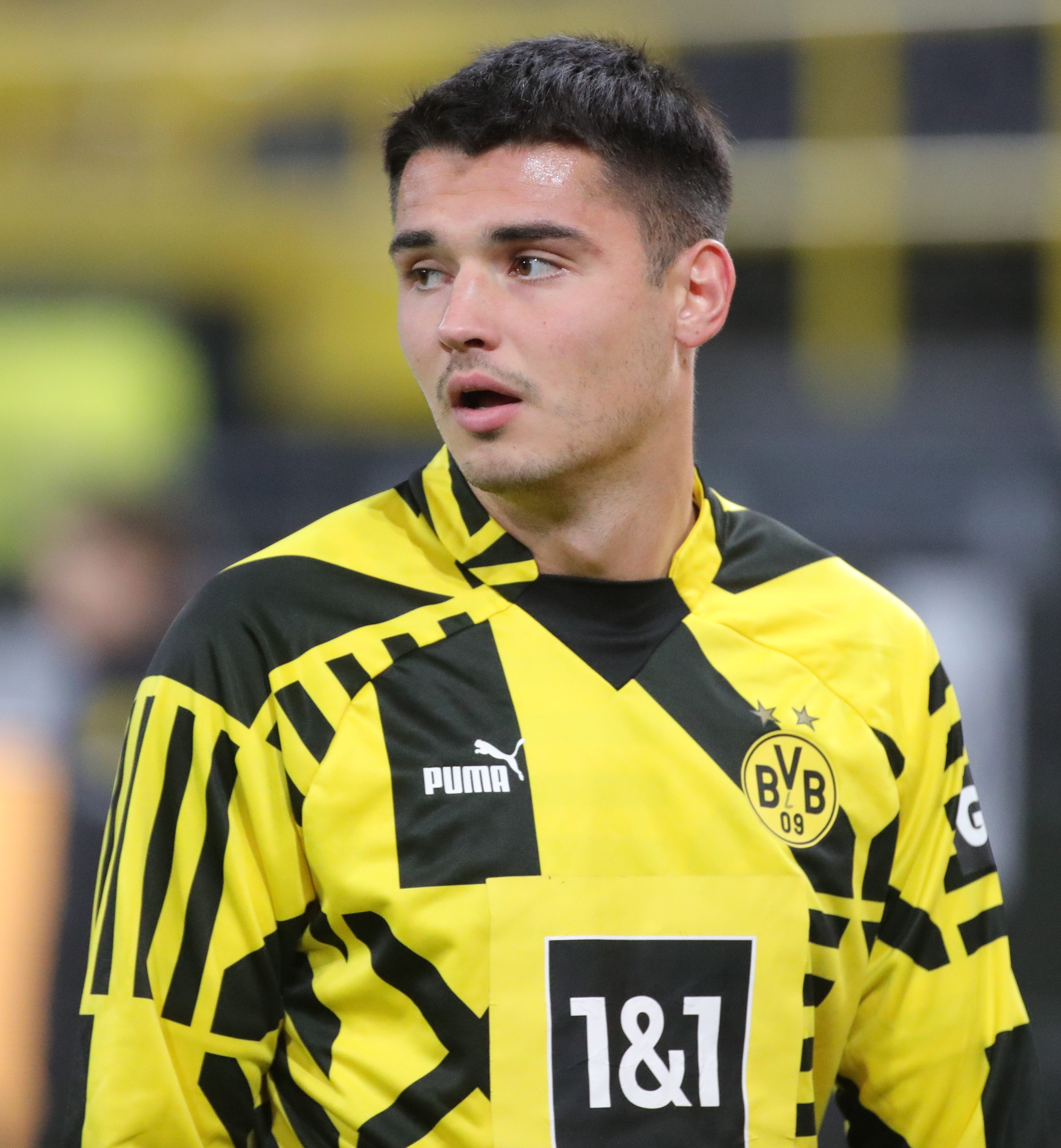
- Mario Šuver (2022)

Personal information
- Date of birth: 23 September 1999 (age 27)
- Place of birth: Stuttgart, Germany
- Height: 1.86 m (6 ft 1 in)
- Position: Centre-back

Team information
- Current team: MFK Skalica
- Number: 23

Youth career
- –2013: SportVg Feuerbach
- 2013–2017: Stuttgarter Kickers

Senior career*
Years	Team	Apps	(Gls)
2017–2018	Stuttgarter Kickers	28	(0)
2018–2019	VfB Stuttgart II	25	(0)
2019–2022	1. FC Nürnberg II	30	(1)
2021–2022	1. FC Nürnberg	13	(0)
2022–2024	Borussia Dortmund II	34	(0)
2024	NK Rudeš	9	(0)
2025-2026	MFK Skalica	43	(3)

International career^{‡}
2016	Croatia U17	4	(0)
- * Club domestic league appearances and goals as of 25 May 2026 ‡ National team caps and goals as of 21:25, 10 May 2021 (UTC)

Mario Šuver (born 23 September 1999) is a professional footballer who plays as a centre-back for Slovak club MFK Skalica. Born in Germany, he has represented Croatia at youth level.

== Club career ==
Šuver made his professional debut for 1. FC Nürnberg in the 2. Bundesliga on 10 May 2021, coming on as a substitute in the 84th minute for Tom Krauß against Hamburger SV. The away match finished as a 5–2 loss for Nürnberg.

On 12 June 2022, Šuver signed with Borussia Dortmund II.

== International career ==
Šuver made four appearances for the Croatia national under-17 team in January and February 2016.

== Personal life ==
Šuver was born in Stuttgart, Baden-Württemberg.
