= Cífer =

Village in Trnava Region, Slovakia

- Municipality
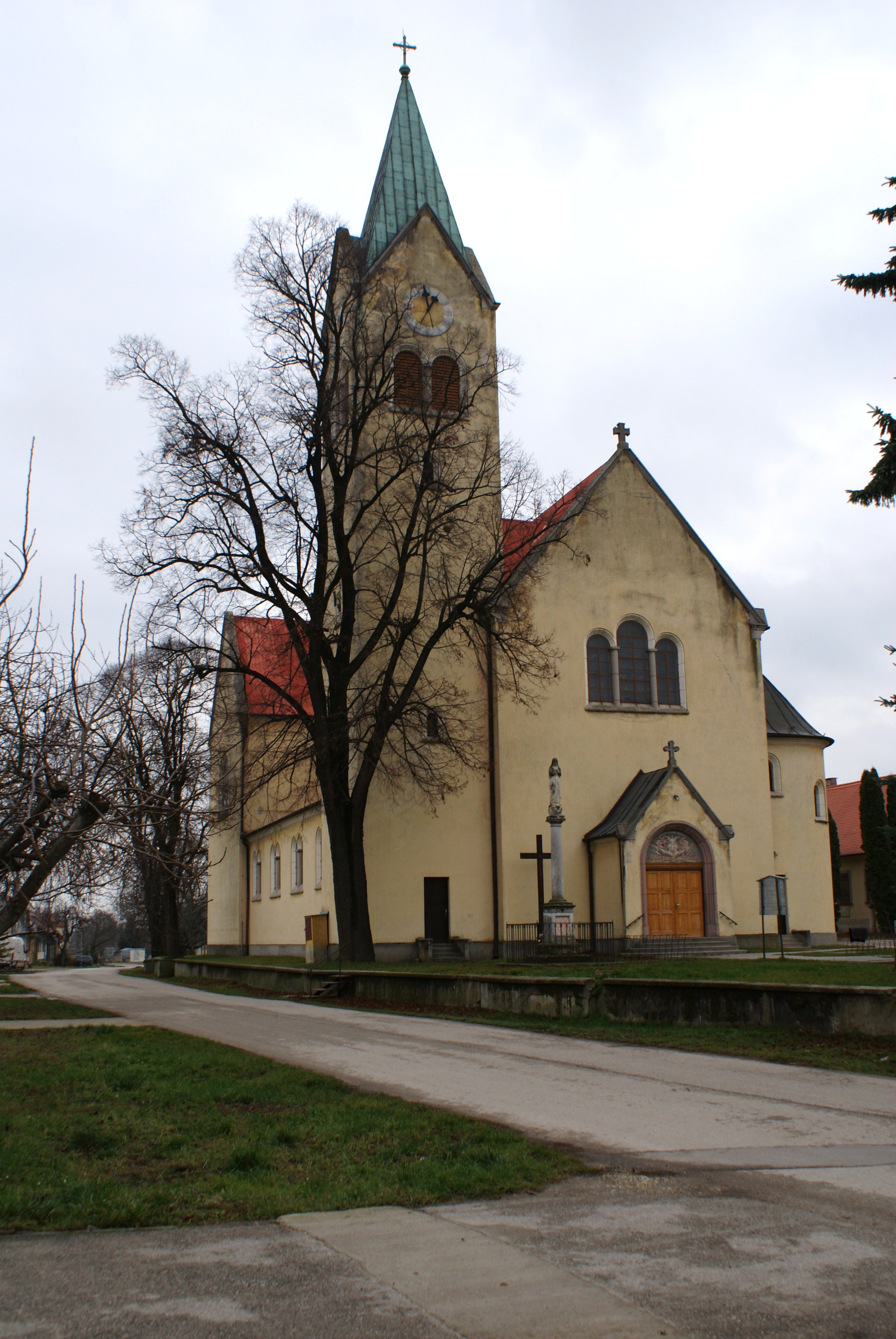
- Church of St. Michael in Cífer

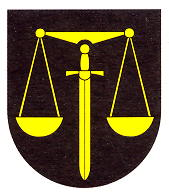
- Flag Coat of arms

- Location of Cífer in the Trnava Region Location of Cífer in Slovakia
- Coordinates: 48.32°N 17.50°E
- Country: Slovakia
- Region: Trnava Region
- District: Trnava District
- First mentioned: 1291

Government
  - Mayor: Maroš Sagan

Area
  - Total: 29.88 km^{2} (11.54 sq mi)
- Elevation: 149 m (489 ft)

Population (2025)
  - Total: 4,901
- Time zone: UTC+1 (CET)
  - Summer (DST): UTC+2 (CEST)
- Postal code: 919 43
- Area code: +421 33
- Vehicle registration plate (until 2022): TT
- Website: www.cifer.sk

Cífer is a municipality (village) in the Trnava District, Slovakia. It has a population of 4,610.

Archaeological finds from the Neolithic, Bronze Age, Roman Period, and early Slavic period have been made in the village. The first written mention of the settlement dates from 1291. It received town status in the early 18th century, but it has lost it since then.

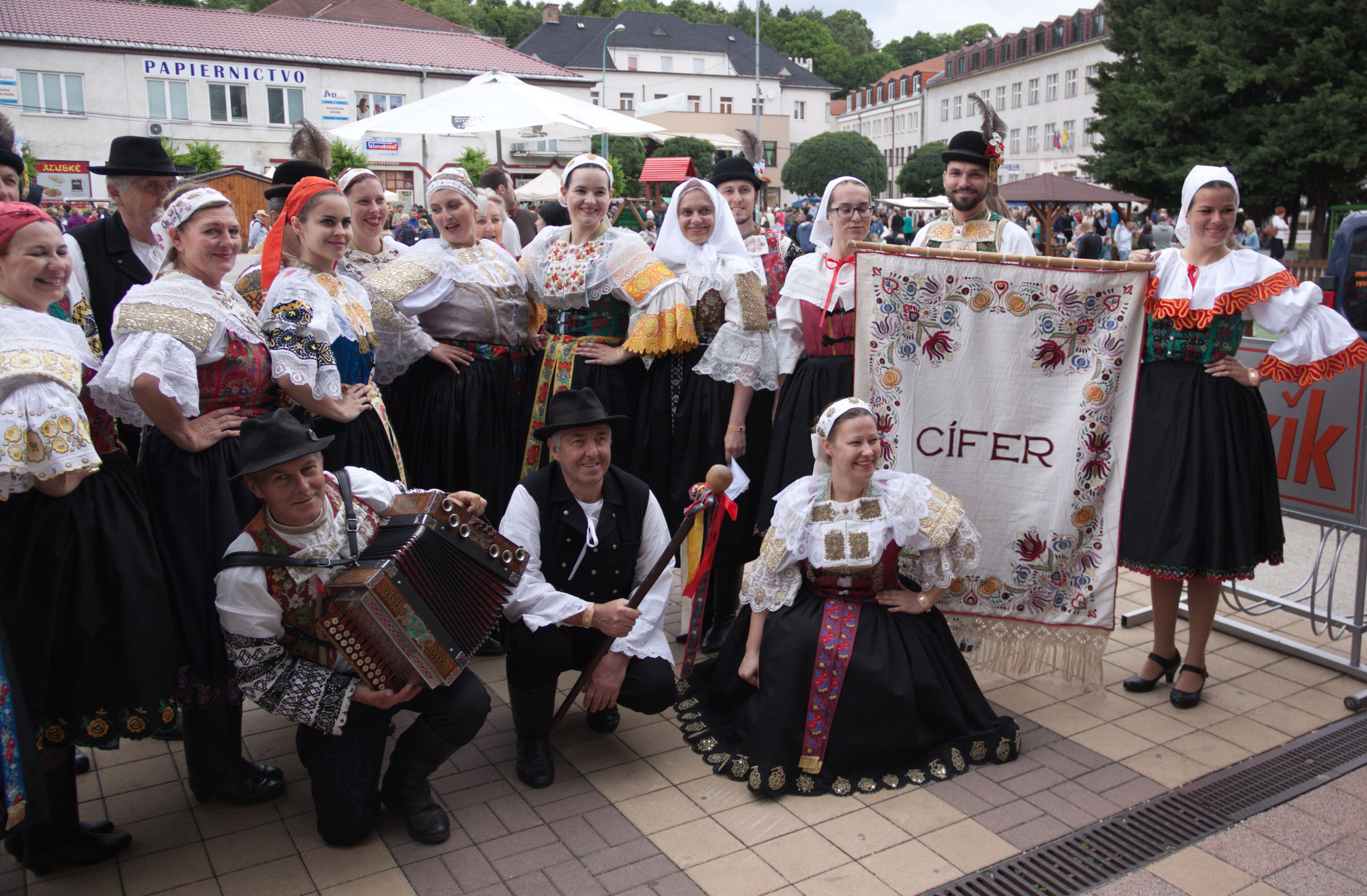
Folk group from Cífer wearing traditional costumes.

== Geography ==
The municipality lies at an altitude of 149 metres (489 ft) and covers an area of 29.88 km^{2} (11.54 sq mi) (2025).

== Population ==
Population statistic (10 years)
Year	1995	2005	2015	2025
Count	3761	3849	4188	4901
Difference		+2.33%	+8.80%	+17.02%

Population statistic
Year	2024	2025
Count	4886	4901
Difference		+0.30%

It has a population of 4901 people (31 December 2025).

=== Ethnicity ===
Census 2021 (1+ %)
Ethnicity	Number	Fraction
Slovak	4306	95.68%
Not found out	151	3.35%
Total	4500	

In year 2021 was 4500 people by ethnicity 4306 as Slovak, 151 as Not found out, 38 as Czech, 25 as Other, 18 as Hungarian, 11 as Russian, 7 as Vietnamese, 6 as Ukrainian, 6 as Rusyn, 5 as Polish, 4 as Romani, 4 as German, 4 as French, 4 as Bulgarian, 3 as Serbian, 3 as Moravian, 2 as Irish, 2 as Romanian, 1 as Italian, 1 as Austrian, 1 as Croatian and 1 as English.

Note on population: The difference values of population numbers in the table "Population statistic" and in the sections "Ethnicity" & "Religion" is caused by the use of various statistical methods.

=== Religion ===
Census 2021 (1+ %)
Religion	Number	Fraction
Roman Catholic Church	3215	71.44%
None	914	20.31%
Not found out	190	4.22%
Evangelical Church	63	1.4%
Total	4500	

In year 2021 was 4500 people by religion 3215 from Roman Catholic Church, 914 from None, 190 from Not found out, 63 from Evangelical Church, 25 from Greek Catholic Church, 19 from Ad hoc movements, 12 from Other and not ascertained christian church, 11 from Eastern Orthodox Church, 10 from Christian Congregations in Slovakia, 8 from Other, 7 from Church of the Brethren, 6 from Paganism and natural spirituality, 6 from United Methodist Church, 4 from Buddhism, 3 from Calvinist Church, 2 from Hinduism, 1 from Old Catholic Church, 1 from Islam, 1 from Czechoslovak Hussite Church, 1 from Seventh-day Adventist Church and 1 from Baptists Church.

== Sports ==
Cífer are also home to football club ŠK Cífer, which were founded in 1929.

== Prominent residents ==
- Marcel Gery, bronze medal-winner at the 1992 Olympic Games in Barcelona
- Eduard Mahler, Jewish Hungarian archaeologist
- Ladislav Lučenič, Slovak musician
- Mária Hollósyová, Slovak embroider

== Partner village ==
- Prellenkirchen (Austria)

== Trivia ==
In 1946 the first known complete translation of Bible into Slovak language so called "Camaldolese Bible" had been found in the Roman Catholic parish house of Cífer.

== See also ==
- List of municipalities and towns in Slovakia

== Genealogical resources ==
The records for genealogical research are available at the state archive "Statny Archiv in Bratislava, Slovakia"

- Roman Catholic church records (births/marriages/deaths): 1666-1898 (parish A)
- Lutheran church records (births/marriages/deaths): 1666-1896 (parish B)
- Reformated church records (births/marriages/deaths): 1787-1924 (parish B)
