= Opoj =

Village in Slovakia

- Municipality
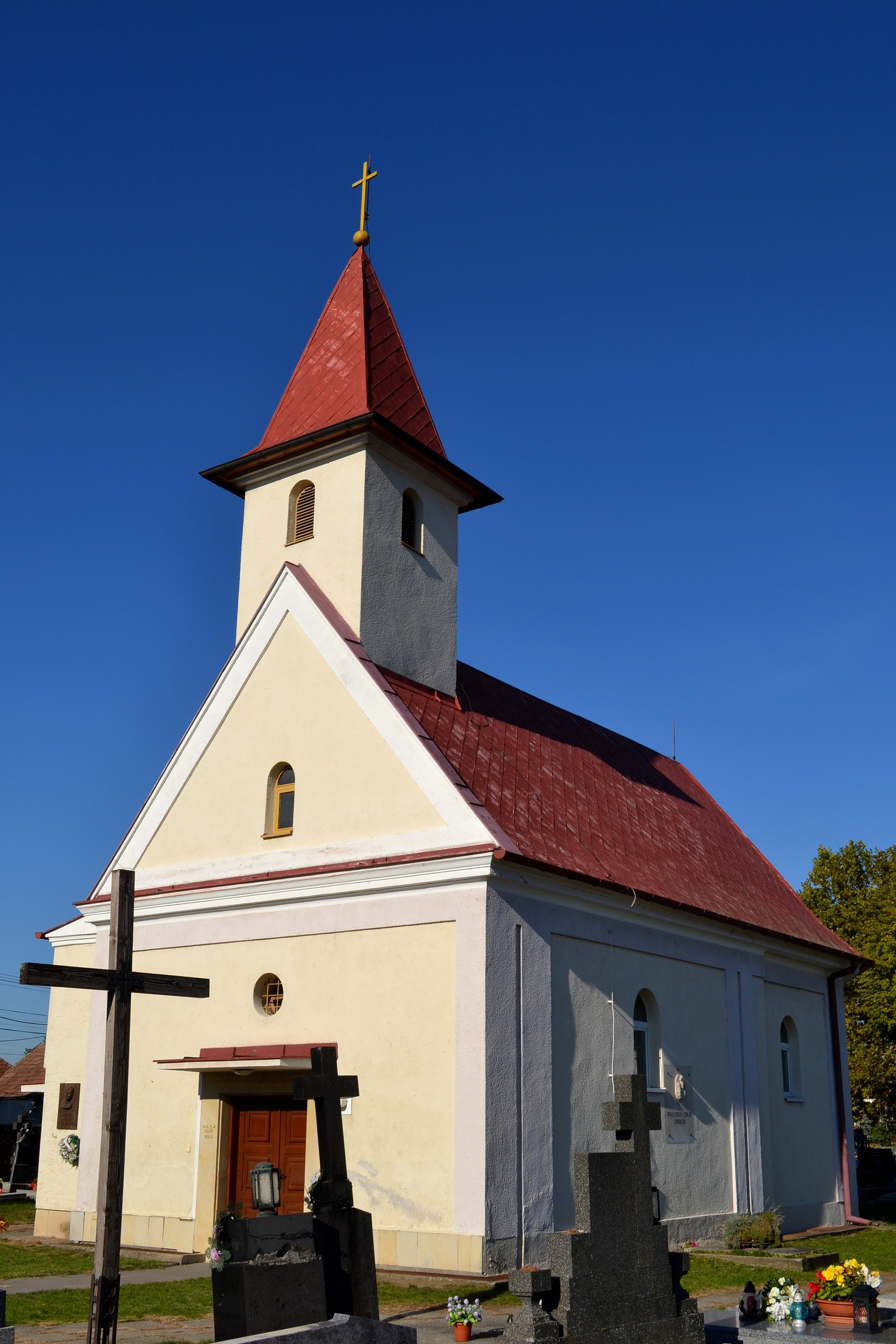

- Flag

- Location of Opoj in the Trnava Region Location of Opoj in Slovakia
- Coordinates: 48.30°N 17.65°E
- Country: Slovakia
- Region: Trnava Region
- District: Trnava District
- First mentioned: 1266

Area
  - Total: 4.61 km^{2} (1.78 sq mi)
- Elevation: 131 m (430 ft)

Population (2025)
  - Total: 1,349
- Time zone: UTC+1 (CET)
  - Summer (DST): UTC+2 (CEST)
- Postal code: 919 32
- Area code: +421 33
- Vehicle registration plate (until 2022): TT
- Website: www.opoj.sk

Opoj (Hungarian: Apaj) is a village and municipality of Trnava District in the Trnava region of Slovakia.

== Geography ==
The municipality lies at an altitude of 131 metres (430 ft) and covers an area of 4.61 km^{2} (1.78 sq mi) (2025).

== Etymology ==
The name comes from the Slovak opojiť: to saturate, to soak (with water). Opoj: literally "a land area that is saturated with water" (wet meadow). 1266 Opoy.

== History ==
The surroundings of the village of Opoj were a suitable place for settlement in prehistorc times, thanks to the ubiquitous water. The oldest remains of human activity in the surroundings of Opoj are finds from the Old Stone Age, from a period of approximately 38,000 years. The first finds from the cadastral area of Opoj come directly from the New Stone Age, defined by the years 5000 BC to 3300 BC. From 550 AD, the first Slavs penetrated this territory. Under their pressure, part of the original Germanic ethnic group that was located here disintegrated. In 833, the new state entity of Great Moravia emerged by merging the Principalities of Nitra and Moravia . This entity is also extremely important for understanding the history of the surroundings of Opoj, because it was during this period that the Slavs founded a large lowland fort near Dudváh. The first known written mention of Opoy is found in a document of the Nitra Chapter from 1266. The content of the document concerns the sale of part of the property of Majcichov. In the document of the Bratislava Chapter from 1278, which describes the borders of Zeleneč, Slovakia, “terra Opoy” is mentioned as the property of Bratislava Castle.

== Notable residents ==
- Mária Hollósyová (1858–1945), embroider
- Martin Mášik (1999–), football player

== Population ==
Population statistic (10 years)
Year	1995	2005	2015	2025
Count	779	818	1062	1349
Difference		+5.00%	+29.82%	+27.02%

Population statistic
Year	2024	2025
Count	1344	1349
Difference		+0.37%

It has a population of 1349 people (31 December 2025).

=== Ethnicity ===
Census 2021 (1+ %)
Ethnicity	Number	Fraction
Slovak	1201	94.64%
Not found out	50	3.94%
Total	1269	

In year 2021 was 1269 people by ethnicity 1201 as Slovak, 50 as Not found out, 9 as Czech, 7 as Hungarian, 5 as Russian, 4 as Romanian, 4 as Other, 3 as Vietnamese, 2 as Romani, 2 as Rusyn, 2 as German, 2 as Moravian, 1 as Serbian, 1 as Austrian, 1 as Croatian and 1 as Bulgarian.

Note on population: The difference values of population numbers in the table "Population statistic" and in the sections "Ethnicity" & "Religion" is caused by the use of various statistical methods.

=== Religion ===
Census 2021 (1+ %)
Religion	Number	Fraction
Roman Catholic Church	898	70.76%
None	266	20.96%
Not found out	47	3.7%
Evangelical Church	14	1.1%
Total	1269	

In year 2021 was 1269 people by religion 898 from Roman Catholic Church, 266 from None, 47 from Not found out, 14 from Evangelical Church, 8 from Greek Catholic Church, 6 from Eastern Orthodox Church, 6 from Ad hoc movements, 5 from Paganism and natural spirituality, 4 from Seventh-day Adventist Church, 3 from Other, 3 from Buddhism, 2 from Calvinist Church, 2 from Christian Congregations in Slovakia, 1 from Other and not ascertained christian church, 1 from Jehovah's Witnesses, 1 from Islam, 1 from Hinduism and 1 from United Methodist Church.
