= Oliver Klimpl =

Slovak footballer (born 2004)

Personal information
- Date of birth: 20 September 2004 (age 22)
- Place of birth: Slovakia
- Position: Centre-back

Team information
- Current team: Teplice B

Youth career
- –2021: MFK Ružomberok
- 2021–2023: Dukla Banská Bystrica

Senior career*
Years	Team	Apps	(Gls)
2023–2026	Dukla Banská Bystrica	27	(0)
2026–	Teplice	0	(0)
2026–	→ Teplice B	0	(0)

International career^{‡}
2025–	Slovakia U20	2	(0)
- * Club domestic league appearances and goals as of 2 February 2026 ‡ National team caps and goals as of 2 February 2026

Oliver Klimpl (born 20 September 2004) is a Slovak footballer who plays as a centre-back for FK Teplice B in the Bohemian Football League and for the Slovakia national under-20 football team.

== Club career ==
=== Banská Bystrica ===
After leaving the MFK Ružomberok youth academy, Klimpl joined Dukla Banská Bystrica. After impressing with his performances in the B team, he would be promoted to the first side. He debuted for Dukla in a 1–0 away win against ViOn Zlaté Moravce on 20 April 2024, playing the full game. In the 2024–25 season, Banská Bystrica were relegated from the Slovak First Football League. Klimpl would play only five second league matches and one Slovak Cup match after getting an injury to his right ankle in the fourth round against MŠK Považská Bystrica.

=== FK Teplice ===
On 18 December 2025, it was announced that Klimpl had joined Czech club FK Teplice. He signed a 3-year contract with the club. It was announced that he will start in the B team of Teplice.

== International career ==
On 11 November 2024, Klimpl was nominated for the Slovakia national under-20 football team ahead of a preparation match against the Montenegro national under-20 team. He played 45 minutes of the 2–0 loss after coming on off the bench at half time. 6 months later, Klimpl was nominated for a friendly match against Scotland U20. He got his second international appearance after coming off the bench and helping Slovakia win 2–1.
