= Roman Hudec =

Slovak football manager

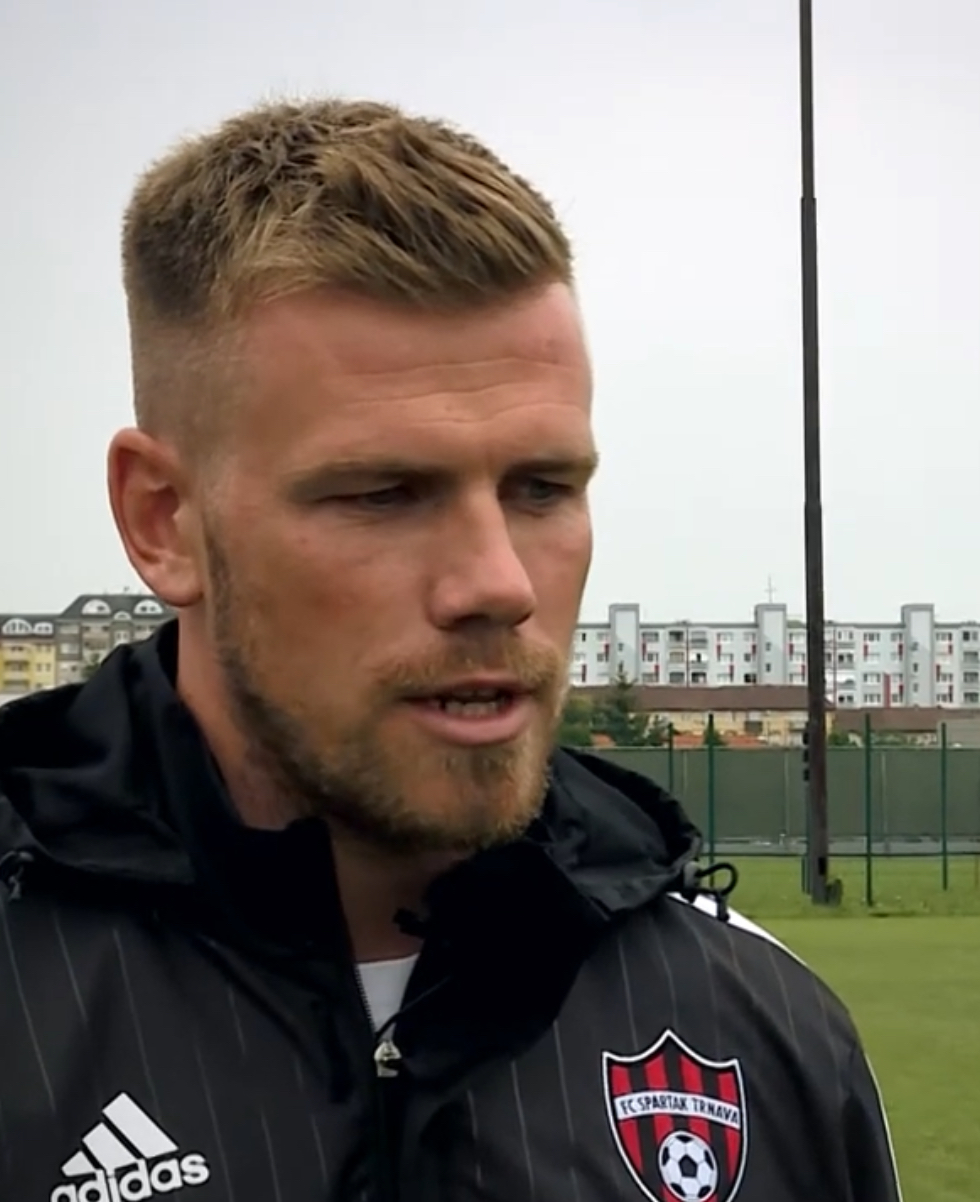
- Hudec in 2018

Personal information
- Date of birth: 10 June 1986 (age 40)
- Place of birth: Nitra, Czechoslovakia

Team information
- Current team: Skalica

Managerial career
- Years: Team
- 2021–2022: Sereď (assistant)
- 2022–2023: Skalica (assistant)
- 2024: FC Košice (assistant)
- 2024–2025: ViOn Zlaté Moravce
- 2025–2026: Skalica

Roman Hudec (born 19 June 1986) is a Slovak football manager who is currently the manager of Slovak First Football League club MFK Skalica.

== Managerial career ==
=== Early career ===
Hudec trained youth players in the academies of FC Nitra, Spartak Trnava and Dunajská Streda. He won the U15 league with Trnava in 2018. In the first division, he was an assistant to Juraj Jarábek in Sereď, later, he was assisting Pavol Majerník in MFK Skalica. In 2024, Hudec was assistant manager to Gergely Geri until the end of the 2023–24 season.

=== Zlaté Moravce ===
On 28 April 2024, it was announced that Hudec would be joining 2. Liga club FC ViOn Zlaté Moravce, with the goal of getting promotion. He led Zlaté Moravce to the promotion play-offs after securing 2nd spot in the 2. Liga. His team would draw the first leg at home 1–1 against Trenčín. His team would eventually lose 4–2 in the second leg. After a 3–2 loss to FC Petržalka, it was announced that Hudec would be resigning from the club.

=== MFK Skalica ===
On 1 December 2025, it was announced that Hudec would be becoming the next manager of Slovak First Football League club MFK Skalica, replacing Czech coach David Oulehla. His first game in charge would be in a 1–1 draw against KFC Komárno, conceding a late penalty scored by Šimon Šmehyl in the 94th minute of the game. Hudec’s next game with Skalica would be in a 2–0 loss against his former club Spartak Trnava, sending Skalica to bottom spot in the table.
