= Eduard Mahler =

Austro-Hungarian scientist

Eduard Mahler (Hungarian: Mahler Ede, September 28, 1857, in Cífer, Kingdom of Hungary, Austrian Empire – June 29, 1945, in Újpest) was a Hungarian-Austrian astronomer, Orientalist, and natural scientist.

He graduated from a Vienna public school in 1876 and then studied mathematics and physics at the University of Vienna, receiving his degree in 1880. From November 1, 1882 until the death of Theodor von Oppolzer in December, 1886, Mahler participated in Oppolzer's research. On June 1, 1885, he was an appointed an assistant in the royal Austrian Institute of Weights and Measures.

Mahler devoted himself chiefly to chronology. In early life, he paid considerable attention to ancient Oriental history, Assyriology, and Egyptology, in which subjects he was a present private docent at the University of Budapest. On September 6, 1889, he received the royal medal Litteris et Artibus of Sweden and Norway; and in 1898 he became an official at the Hungarian National Museum.

== Literary works ==
Mahler has published:

- "Fundamentalsätze der Allgemeinen Flächentheorie," Vienna, 1881;
- "Astronomische Untersuchung über die in der Bibel erwähnte ägyptische Finsterniss," ib. 1885;
- "Die Centralen Sonnenfinsternisse," ib. 1885;
- "Biblische Chronologie und Zeitrechnung der Hebräer," ib. 1887;
- "Fortsetzung der Wüstenfeld'schen Vergleichungs-Tabellen der Muhammedanischen und Christlichen Zeitrechnung," Leipzig, 1887;
- "Chronologische Vergleichungs-Tabellen," Vienna, 1889;
- "Maimonides' Kiddusch-Hachodesch," ib. 1890 (translated and explained);
- "Handbuch der jüdischen Chronologie," London, 1916;

besides many papers in Hungarian as well as contributions to various German scientific journals, as:

- "Zeitschrift der Deutschen Morgenländischen Gesellschaft"
- "Sitzungsberichte der Kaiserlichen Akademie der Wissenschaften"
- "Journal Asiatique"
- "Zeitschrift für Assyriologie"
- "Zeitschrift für Mathematik und Physik"
- "Zeitschrift für ägyptische Sprache und Alterthumskunde"
