= Miha Kompan Breznik =

Slovenian footballer (born 2003)

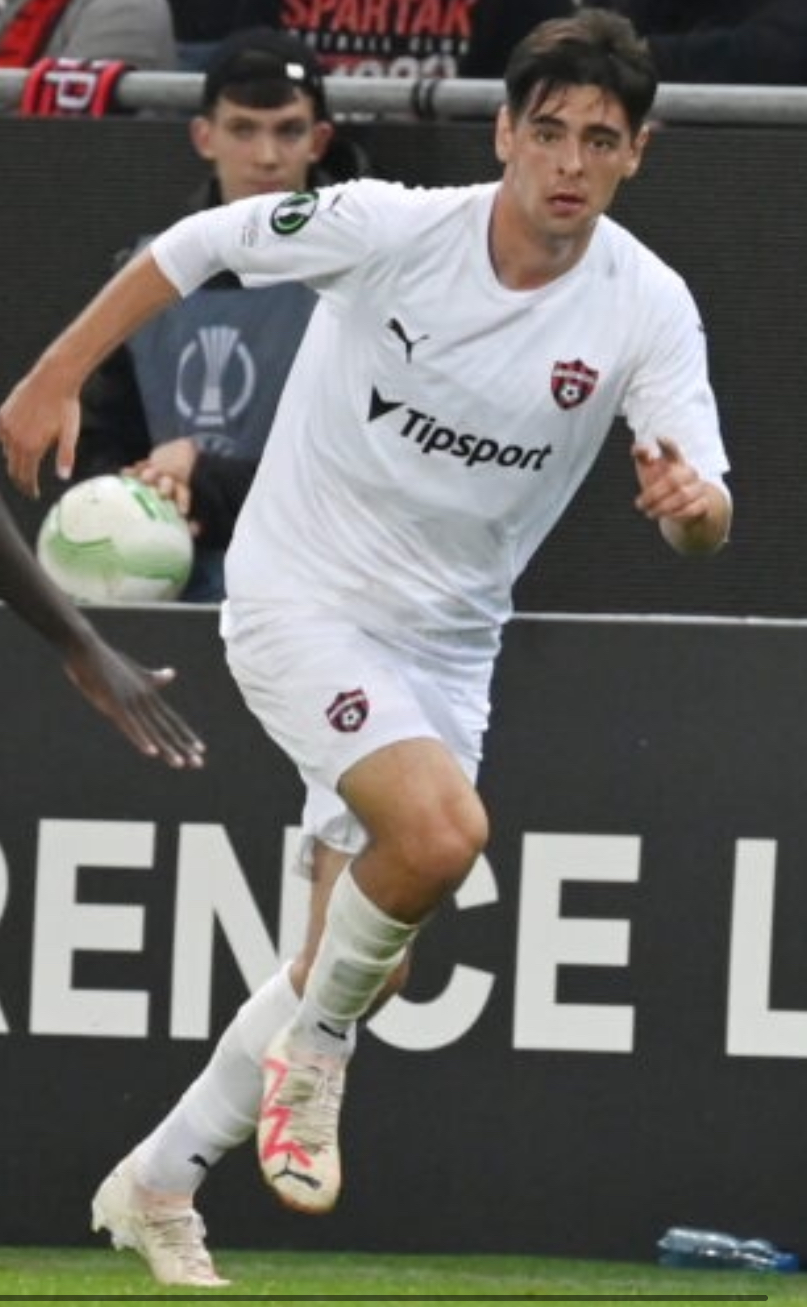
- Kompan Breznik in 2023

Personal information
- Date of birth: 5 October 2003 (age 23)
- Place of birth: Maribor, Slovenia
- Height: 1.87 m (6 ft 2 in)
- Position: Left-back

Team information
- Current team: Dynamo Malženice
- Number: 14

Youth career
- Maribor
- Sturm Graz
- Koper
- Olimpija Ljubljana

Senior career*
Years	Team	Apps	(Gls)
2021	Olimpija Ljubljana	5	(0)
2022–2023	Mura	4	(0)
2023	→ Tabor Sežana (loan)	7	(0)
2023–2025	Spartak Trnava	7	(1)
2024–2025	→ Radomlje (loan)	16	(0)
2025–	Dynamo Malženice	27	(3)
- * Club domestic league appearances and goals as of 25 May 2026

Miha Kompan Breznik (born 5 October 2003) is a Slovenian footballer who plays as a left-back for Slovak club Dynamo Malženice.

== Club career ==
=== Early career ===
He was a part of the youth teams of Koper, and Olimpija Ljubljana, for which he made seven appearances in the 1st Slovenian youth league and five in the club competition. He played in Olimpija as an amateur and did not want to sign a professional contract.

On 2 January 2022, it was announced that Kompan Breznik would be joining NS Mura, signing on a 2 year contract. He was then loaned out to Tabor Sežana in January 2023.

=== Spartak Trnava ===
Kompan Breznik joined Slovak club Spartak Trnava in June 2023, signing a three-year contract. He made his league debut for Spartak in a 2–0 win at home against Železiarne Podbrezová, where he also scored in the 48th minute.

He made his European debut for the club coming on as a substitute for Erik Daniel in the 89th minute in a 1–1 draw against FK Auda in the 2nd round of the Conference League qualifications. He also made 2 appearances in the group stage of the Conference League, against Fenerbahçe and Nordsjælland.

He was then loaned out to Slovenian club NK Radomlje.

=== Dynamo Malženice ===
After failing to succeed at Spartak, Kompan Breznik joined their feeder club Dynamo Malženice. He made his debut for the club in a 0–0 draw in the league against FK Pohronie, playing the full 90 minutes. Kompan Breznik scored his first goal for Malženice in a 4–3 loss against FC ViOn Zlaté Moravce, scoring in the 21st minute of the game.
