= Patrick Karhan =

Slovak youth international footballer

Personal information
- Date of birth: 19 June 2003 (age 23)
- Place of birth: Wolfsburg, Germany
- Height: 1.85 m (6 ft 1 in)
- Positions: Centre-back; defensive midfielder

Team information
- Current team: Skalica (on loan from Spartak Trnava)
- Number: 6

Youth career
- 2010–2021: Spartak Trnava

Senior career*
Years	Team	Apps	(Gls)
2021–	Spartak Trnava	26	(0)
2023–2024	→ Dynamo Malženice (loan)	29	(1)
2026–	→ Skalica (loan)	13	(0)

International career
- Slovakia U17
- Slovakia U18
- * Club domestic league appearances and goals as of 1 November 2026

Patrick Karhan (born 19 June 2003) is a Slovak footballer who plays for Skalica, on loan from Spartak Trnava, as a centre-back or defensive midfielder.

== Club career ==
=== Spartak Trnava ===
Karhan made his Fortuna Liga debut for Spartak Trnava in a home fixture at Štadión Antona Malatinského on 2 May 2021 in a traditional derby against Slovan Bratislava. He came on in the 86th minute to replace Martin Bukata with the score set at 3-0, following two penalty goals by Milan Ristovski and a second-half strike by Bamidele Yusuf. Less than two minutes into his debut, Karhan was involved in an in-play incident with Bulgarian international Vasil Bozhikov during an attempt to header the ball. Karhan had struck Bozhikov, who suffered an injury and had to be taken off the pitch. Subsequently, Erik Gemzický had awarded Karhan with a red card. This foul was judged as a youthful over-motivation or inexperienced misjudgment after the match by the media. The result meant that Slovan was denied the opportunity to celebrate title retention.

In June 2022, Karhan signed his first professional contract with Spartak along with Marek Ujlaky, whose father Marek played over 400 matches for Spartak and collected caps for Slovakia. Both players were to succeed their fathers in their careers and serve as a motivation for other academy players of Spartak Trnava, according to club president Peter Macho.

On 31st July, 2024 Patrick Karhan scored his first goal for Spartak in a 3:0 win against FK Sarajevo in the second round of qualification in the UEFA Conference League, coming on as a substitute for Roman Procházka.

On 27 August 2025, Karhan signed a new contract valid until 2027 with Spartak.

== Personal life ==
Karhan was born in Wolfsburg, Germany. Karhan is the son of Miroslav Karhan, who managed Spartak Trnava and played over 200 matches for them, featured in over 280 matches in the Bundesliga, while playing for Wolfsburg and Mainz 05 and was the first player to collect 100 caps for the Slovak national team (107 in total), holding the record for the most capped player until it was beaten by Marek Hamšík in 2018. He also has a younger brother named Alex Thomas. He studied high school at a sports gymnasium in Trnava.

== Honours ==
Spartak Trnava

- Slovak Cup: 2021–22, 2022–23, 2024–25
