= Nicolas Kurej =

Slovak footballer (born 2004)

Personal information
- Date of birth: April 7, 2004 (age 22)
- Place of birth: Bardejov, Slovakia
- Position: Defender

Team information
- Current team: Dynamo Malženice
- Number: 17

Youth career
- –2019: Dunajská Streda
- 2019–2023: Spartak Trnava

Senior career*
Years	Team	Apps	(Gls)
2023–2025	Spartak Trnava	0	(0)
2024–2025	Dynamo Malženice (loan)	24	(1)
2025–	Dynamo Malženice	20	(1)

International career
2025–	Slovakia U20	1	(0)
- * Club domestic league appearances and goals as of 25 May 2026

Nicolas Kurej (born April 7, 2004) is a Slovak football player who currently plays for Slovak 2. Liga club OFK Dynamo Malženice.

He previously played for first division side Spartak Trnava at youth level.

== Club career ==
=== Early career ===
Kurej grew up playing football in the east, but headed to the west of Slovakia for better opportunities. He originally played as a centre-forward but later moved to a more defensive position. Through the academies of Dunajská Streda and Spartak Trnava, he made it to the second-league side Dynamo Malženice. While on loan at Dynamo Malženice, Kurej played every game in the league and cup, impressing with his performances. Despite being part of Spartak Trnava’s summer pre-season preparations, Kurej would permanently join Malženice.

=== Dynamo Malženice ===
Kurej scored his first league goal in a 3–1 loss against MFK Zvolen, scoring the only goal of the game for his club. His first game for Malženice after permanently coming to the club would be in a 0–0 draw against FK Pohronie. In the 3rd round of the Slovak Cup, Kurej scored the equalizing goal against Slovan Duslo Šaľa. Malženice would go on to win the game on penalties 5–3 after drawing the game 1–1, advancing to the next round. In a 2–2 draw in the league against Slávia TU Košice, Kurej would equalize the game in the 67th minute after scoring a header from a set piece.

== International career ==
On May 18, 2025, Kurej was nominated to represent the Slovakia national under-20 football team in a friendly game against Scotland U20. He had previously played for the team in a game against Montenegro U20.
