= Mário Hollý =

Slovak footballer (born 2000)

Personal information
- Full name: Mário Hollý
- Date of birth: 25 April 2000 (age 26)
- Place of birth: Slovakia
- Height: 1.85 m (6 ft 1 in)
- Position: Central midfielder

Team information
- Current team: Skalica
- Number: 22

Youth career
- –2011: TJ Kopčany
- 2012–2016: Senica
- 2016–2018: Skalica

Senior career*
Years	Team	Apps	(Gls)
2018–	Skalica	154	(5)
- * Club domestic league appearances and goals as of 25 May 2026

Mário Hollý (born 25 April 2000) is a Slovak professional footballer who plays as a central midfielder for MFK Skalica in the Niké Liga.

He is a product of the Skalica youth academy.

== Club career ==
=== Early career ===
He started playing football in his hometown, and later continued in the Czech village of Vacenovice, from the under-10 to under-17 category he played in the FK Senica academy. He then continued in MFK Skalica, where he also established himself at the men's level in the second league.

=== MFK Skalica ===
Hollý scored his debut goal for his club in a 3–0 win over Slovan Bratislava B. He made his professional Fortuna Liga debut for MFK Skalica on 17 July 2022 against MFK Ružomberok. Hollý scored his first top flight goal on 11 March 2023 in a 3–0 win over MFK Tatran Liptovský Mikuláš, scoring in the 39” minute to set the score line to 2–0 in Skalica's favor. A few weeks later, he would go on to score the winning goal against MFK Zemplín Michalovce in a 3–2 win for his club. On 27 October 2025, in a 2–0 loss against Zemplín Michalovce, Hollý would kick the assistant referee, receiving a 3-month ban. 2 days later he would make an official apology, saying that his emotions got the better of him.

== Personal life ==
Hollý comes from Kopčany, a village located by the Czech border.
