= Oliver Podhorin =

Slovak footballer

Oliver Podhorín
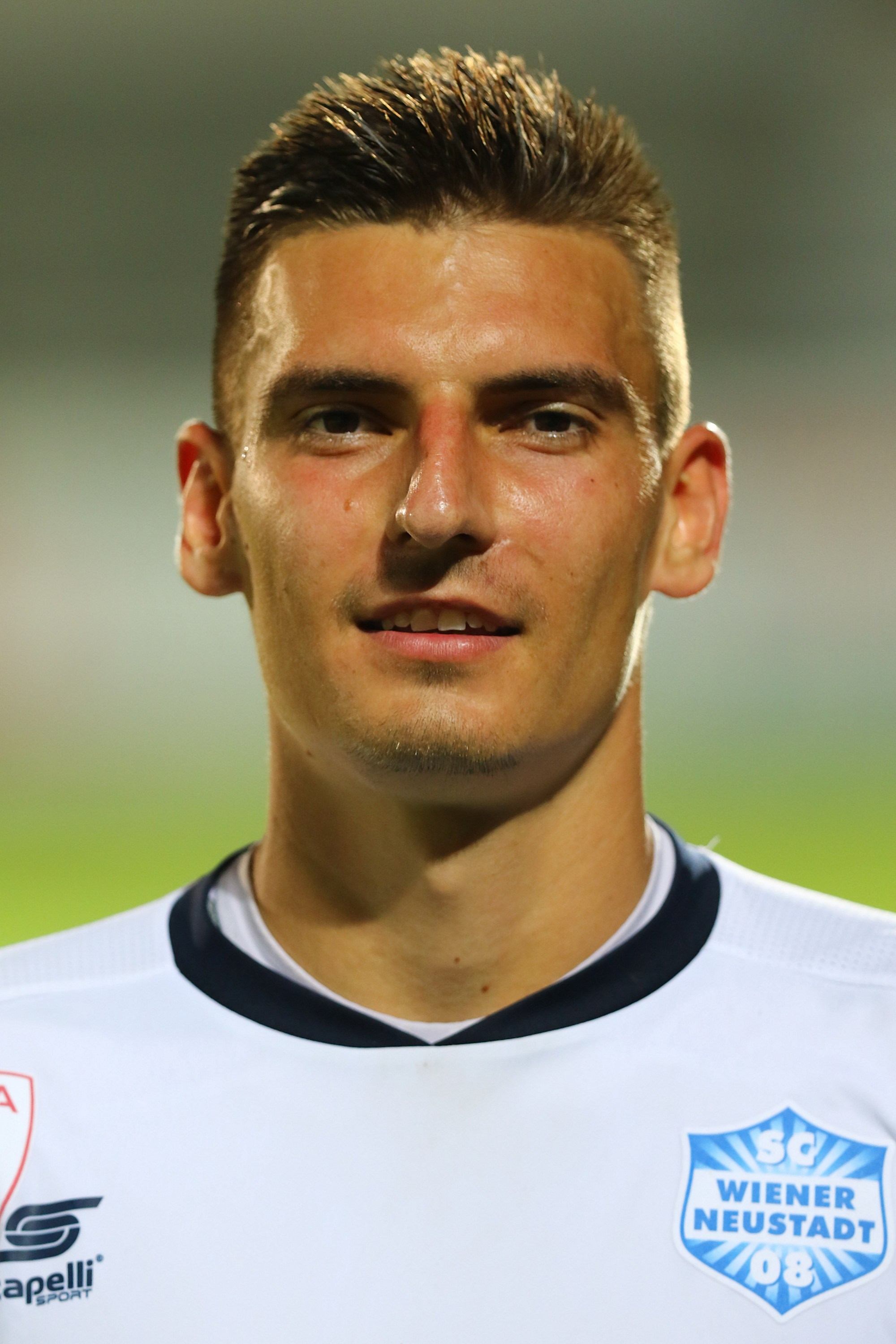

Personal information
- Full name: Oliver Podhorín
- Date of birth: 6 July 1992 (age 34)
- Place of birth: Michalovce, Czechoslovakia
- Height: 1.83 m (6 ft 0 in)
- Position: Centre-back

Team information
- Current team: MFK Skalica
- Number: 20

Youth career
- Zemplín Michalovce

Senior career*
Years	Team	Apps	(Gls)
2012–2017	Zemplín Michalovce	102	(5)
2017–2018	Senica	26	(6)
2018–2019	Wiener Neustadt	15	(0)
2019–2020	Nitra	43	(2)
2021–2022	Resovia Rzeszów	29	(2)
2022	GKS Jastrzębie	13	(0)
2022–	Skalica	82	(6)
- * Club domestic league appearances and goals as of 25 May 2026

Oliver Podhorin (born 6 July 1992) is a Slovak professional footballer who plays as a centre-back for MFK Skalica.

== Club career ==
Podhorín was born in Michalovce, Slovakia. Podhorín won the 2014–15 DOXXbet liga with Zemplín Michalovce. He made his Fortuna Liga debut in a 1–0 win over AS Trenčín on 18 July 2015.

== Honours ==
Zemplín Michalovce

- 2. Liga: 2014–15
