= Matej Riznič =

Slovak footballer (born 2004)

Personal information
- Date of birth: June 4, 2004 (age 22)
- Place of birth: Bratislava, Slovakia
- Height: 1.87 m (6 ft 2 in)
- Position: Midfielder

Team information
- Current team: FK Teplice
- Number: 25

Youth career
- Slovan Bratislava
- 2021–2022: FC Petržalka

Senior career*
Years	Team	Apps	(Gls)
2022–	FC Petržalka	76	(8)
2025–	FK Teplice (loan)	31	(0)

International career^{‡}
2022	Slovakia U18	4	(1)
2022	Slovakia U19	8	(0)
2025–	Slovakia U20	1	(0)
2023–	Slovakia U21	7	(1)
- * Club domestic league appearances and goals as of 27 May 2026 ‡ National team caps and goals as of 3 February 2026

Matej Riznič (born 4 June 2004) is a Slovak footballer who currently plays for Czech side FK Teplice on loan from FC Petržalka.

Riznič joined Petržalka's youth academy in 2021, from Bratislava. He made his first-team debut for Petrzalka in February 2022. He signed for FK Teplice in June 2025 on a one year loan.

Riznič currently represents the Slovakia national under-21 football team where he plays as a defender.

== Club career ==
=== Petržalka ===
Riznič is a graduate of the FC Petržalka youth academy. He debuted for the club in a 1–0 home loss against Žilina B, coming off the bench in the 58th minute. Riznič helped his club finish second in the league and qualify for the promotion play-offs against Zemplín Michalovce. He would only feature in the second leg of a 2–0 loss, coming off the bench in the 87th minute.

He scored two goals for Petržalka in a 4–0 league win against FK Pohronie.

=== FK Teplice ===
On 16 June 2025, it was announced that Riznič had joined Czech club FK Teplice on a one-year loan with an option to buy. He made his debut for the club in a 3–1 loss against newly promoted FC Zlín, coming onto the field as a substitute in the 65th minute for Ladislav Krejčí. He got his first start in a 3–0 win against Bohemians 1905, playing the whole game. Riznič assisted a goal for Matyáš Kozák in a 2–1 loss against Slavia Prague.

== International career ==
In 2025, Riznič was nominated as a back-up for the Slovakia U21 team ahead of the UEFA European Under-21 Championship held in Slovakia. When he was promoted to the U21 team, coach Jaroslav Kentoš said that Riznič would play as a defender in the upcoming matches. He played his first game in the new position in a 3–0 victory against Andorra U21 in the first qualifying round of the 2027 European Under-21 Championship, where he would score in the 92nd minute. On 18 November 2025, he started in a second round match against England U21.
