= Gergely Geri =

Slovak football manager

Personal information
- Full name: Gergely Geri
- Date of birth: 19 January 1977 (age 49)
- Place of birth: Kráľovský Chlmec, Czechoslovakia (now Slovakia)
- Position: Defender

Youth career
- –1995: TJ Slavoj Kráľovský Chlmec

Senior career*
Years	Team	Apps	(Gls)
1995−2001	Slavoj Trebišov		
1999	→ Rimavská Sobota (loan)		
2000−2001	→ HFC Humenné (loan)		
2001−2004	HFC Humenné		
2004	→ Zemplín Michalovce (loan)		
2005	Spartacus Nyíregyháza		
2005–2015	Rimavská Sobota		
2013	→ LAFC Lučenec (loan)		
2014–2015	→ FK Mesta Tornaľa (loan)		

Managerial career
- 2014–2015: Rimavská Sobota
- 2015–2016: FK Mesta Tornaľa
- 2016–2017: Lokomotíva Zvolen (assistant)
- 2017–2018: Železiarne Podbrezová (youths)
- 2018: Železiarne Podbrezová (assistant)
- 2018: Železiarne Podbrezová
- 2019: Železiarne Podbrezová B
- 2019: Nitra (assistant)
- 2019–2020: Nitra
- 2020: Nitra
- 2020: Diósgyőr
- 2021: Sereď
- 2021: Pohronie
- 2022: Trebišov
- 2023: Zlaté Moravce (Assistant)
- 2023–: FC Košice (youths)
- 2024: FC Košice
- 2025–2026: Victory Sports Club
- 2026-: Spartak Trnava (Assistant)
- * Club domestic league appearances and goals as of 19 May 2024

Gergely Geri (born 19 January 1977) is a Slovak professional football head coach and former player and assistant manager of Spartak Trnava.

== Managerial career ==
In 2021, Geri was sacked of his position at FK Pohronie. After 6 rounds in the league, he amassed 0 wins and a goal difference of –6.

In 2024, Geri became the manager of FC Košice with Roman Hudec being his assistant manager. A few months later Geri would be sacked by the Košice board.

In October 2025, Geri joined Victory FC, a football team from the Maldives, replacing Adama Abdula Latheefa, who would become Geri’s assistant manager. Geri was praised for getting the team on good form.
