= Damián Bariš =

Slovak footballer

Personal information
- Full name: Damián Bariš
- Date of birth: 9 December 1994 (age 31)
- Place of birth: Trenčín, Slovakia
- Height: 1.78 m (5 ft 10 in)
- Position: Defensive midfielder

Team information
- Current team: AS Trenčín
- Number: 27

Youth career
- AS Trenčín

Senior career*
Years	Team	Apps	(Gls)
2013–2015	AS Trenčín	13	(0)
2014–2015	→ Nové Mesto nad Váhom (loan)	27	(1)
2015	Skalica	12	(0)
2016–2018	Zlaté Moravce	68	(5)
2018–2022	FC Zbrojovka Brno	101	(6)
2022–2023	Podbrezová	24	(1)
2023–2025	AS Trenčín	57	(3)
2025-	Skalica	0	(0)
- * Club domestic league appearances and goals as of 25 June 2025

Damián Bariš (born 9 December 1994) is a Slovak footballer who plays as a midfielder for MFK Skalica.

== Club career ==
=== AS Trenčín ===
Bariš made his debut for FK AS Trenčín against ŠK Slovan Bratislava on 28 April 2013, entering in as a substitute in place of Aldo Baéz.
