= Slovakia national under-20 football team =

Slovakia U-20
- Nickname(s): Repre; Sokolíci (Little Falcons)
- Association: Slovenský futbalový zväz
- Confederation: UEFA (Europe)
- Home stadium: Tehelné pole
- FIFA code: SVK
First colours	Second colours

FIFA U-20 World Cup
- Appearances: 2 (first in 2003)
- Best result: Round of 16 (2003, 2023)

The Slovakia national under-20 football team, controlled by the Slovak Football Association, is Slovakia's national under-20 football team and is considered to be a feeder team for the Slovakia national football team.

== Tournament history ==
=== FIFA U-20 World Cup ===
Year	Round	GP	W	D	L	GS	GA
(Tunisia) 1977	Part of Czechoslovakia						
(Japan) 1979	Part of Czechoslovakia						
(Australia) 1981	Part of Czechoslovakia						
(Mexico) 1983	Part of Czechoslovakia						
(Soviet Union) 1985	Part of Czechoslovakia						
(Chile) 1987	Part of Czechoslovakia						
(Saudi Arabia) 1989	Part of Czechoslovakia						
(Portugal) 1991	Part of Czechoslovakia						
(Australia) 1993	Part of Czechoslovakia						
(Qatar) 1995	Did not qualify						
(Malaysia) 1997	Did not qualify						
(Nigeria) 1999	Did not qualify						
(Argentina) 2001	Did not qualify						
(United Arab Emirates) 2003	Round of 16	4	2	0	2	6	4
(Netherlands) 2005	Did not qualify						
(Canada) 2007	Did not qualify						
(Egypt) 2009	Did not qualify						
(Colombia) 2011	Did not qualify						
(Turkey) 2013	Did not qualify						
(New Zealand) 2015	Did not qualify						
(South Korea) 2017	Did not qualify						
(Poland) 2019	Did not qualify						
(Argentina) 2023	Round of 16	4	1	0	3	6	9
(Chile) 2025	Did not qualify						
(Azerbaijan) (Uzbekistan) 2027	To be determined						
(Armenia) (Georgia (country)) 2029	To be determined						
Total	2/17	8	3	0	5	12	13

== Players ==
=== Current squad ===
The following players were named in the squad for the friendly against Scotland on 23 May 2025.

No.	Pos.	Player	Date of birth (age)	Caps	Goals	Club
1	GK	Adam Hrdina	12 February 2004 (age 22)	4	0	(Football Association of the Czech Republic) Zbrojovka Brno
21	GK	Dominik Ťapaj	10 May 2004 (age 22)	0	0	(Slovak Football Association) Ružomberok
	DF	Nikolas Brandis	6 May 2005 (age 21)	0	0	(Slovak Football Association) Púchov
	DF	Timotej Hranica	28 May 2005 (age 21)	0	0	(Slovak Football Association) Žilina
23	DF	Tomáš Jaššo	4 March 2004 (age 22)	0	0	(Football Association of the Czech Republic) SFC Opava
	DF	Oliver Klimpl	20 September 2004 (age 22)	0	0	(Slovak Football Association) Dukla Banská Bystrica
	DF	Nicolas Kurej	7 April 2004 (age 22)	0	0	(Slovak Football Association) Malženice
	DF	Michal Mynář	6 February 2004 (age 22)	0	0	(Slovak Football Association) Žilina
	DF	Adam Oravec	18 March 2005 (age 21)	0	0	(Slovak Football Association) Žilina
	DF	Daniel Prekop	20 May 2005 (age 21)	0	0	(Slovak Football Association) Zvolen
	MF	Botond Angyal	12 August 2005 (age 21)	0	0	(Slovak Football Association) Šamorín
	MF	Christián Bačinský	20 November 2004 (age 21)	0	0	(Football Association of the Czech Republic) Dukla Prague
	MF	Jakub Jordán Jokel	11 August 2004 (age 22)	0	0	(Slovak Football Association) Pohronie
	MF	Alexej Maroš	3 January 2005 (age 21)	0	0	(Slovak Football Association) Slovan Bratislava
	MF	Maxim Mateáš	12 May 2008 (age 18)	0	0	(Slovak Football Association) Slovan Bratislava
	MF	Matej Riznič	4 June 2004 (age 22)	0	0	(Slovak Football Association) Petržalka
	FW	Adam Horvát	18 February 2004 (age 22)	0	0	(Slovak Football Association) Tatran Prešov
	FW	Andy Masaryk	7 April 2005 (age 21)	0	0	(Slovak Football Association) Pohronie
	FW	Ľuboš Praženka	20 June 2005 (age 21)	0	0	(Slovak Football Association) Považská Bystrica
	FW	Lukáš Prokop	12 October 2004 (age 22)	0	0	(Slovak Football Association) Žilina
	FW	Milan Rehuš	4 August 2005 (age 21)	0	0	(German Football Association) 1899 Hoffenheim
	FW	Oliver Reiter	27 October 2004 (age 22)	0	0	(Slovak Football Association) Tatran Liptovský Mikuláš

=== Recent call-ups ===
Pos.	Player	Date of birth (age)	Caps	Goals	Club	Latest call-up

== Head-to-head record ==
The following table shows Slovakia's head-to-head record in FIFA U-20 World Cup.

Opponent	Pld	W	D	L	GF	GA	GD	Win %
Brazil	1	0	0	1	1	2	−1	0.00
Burkina Faso	1	0	0	1	0	1	−1	0.00
Colombia	1	0	0	1	1	5	−4	0.00
Ecuador	1	0	0	1	1	2	−1	0.00
Fiji	1	1	0	0	4	0	+4	100.00
Panama	1	1	0	0	1	0	+1	100.00
United Arab Emirates	1	1	0	0	4	1	+3	100.00
United States	1	0	0	1	0	2	−2	0.00
Total	8	3	0	5	12	13	−1	37.50

== See also ==
- Slovakia national football team
- Czechoslovakia national under-21 football team
- Slovakia national under-21 football team
- Slovakia national under-19 football team
- Slovakia national under-18 football team
- Slovakia national under-17 football team
- Slovakia national under-16 football team
