= Marek Švec (footballer) =

Slovak footballer (born 2003)

Personal information
- Date of birth: 31 December 2003 (age 22)
- Place of birth: Partizánske, Slovakia
- Height: 1.78 m (5 ft 10 in)
- Position: Forward

Team information
- Current team: FC Hertha Wels
- Number: 7

Youth career
- 2010–2012: Tempo Partizánske
- 2012–2016: Zlaté Moravce
- 2016–2020: DAC Dunajská Streda

Senior career*
Years	Team	Apps	(Gls)
2021–2024	Zlaté Moravce	35	(5)
2022–2023	→ Dubnica (loan)	27	(9)
2023	→ Spartak Myjava (loan)	13	(6)
2024	Petržalka	9	(1)
2025	Slovan Bratislava B	9	(1)
2025	Skalica	15	(3)
2026–	FC Hertha Wels	12	(4)

International career^{‡}
2021–	Slovakia U19	5	(0)
- * Club domestic league appearances and goals as of 17 May 2026 ‡ National team caps and goals as of 15:28, 15 June 2022 (UTC)

Marek Švec (born 31 December 2003) is a Slovak professional footballer who plays as a forward for FC Hertha Wels.

== Club career ==
Švec signed a three-year contract with FC ViOn Zlaté Moravce in January 2021. He made his Fortuna Liga debut for Zlaté Moravce against DAC Dunajská Streda on 13 March 2021. At the age of 17 he made his first league start against MŠK Žilina and scored a 71st minute header in a 5–1 away loss. Švec joined Spartak Myjava of the Slovak Second League on loan in 2023, scoring 5 goals in his first 8 matches.

== Personal life ==
Švec is the son of Marek Švec, who played in the Slovak First Football League for Prievidza under manager Vladimír Goffa. Marek Švec never scored a top flight league goal.
