= Peter Guinari =

Central African Republic footballer (born 2001)

Personal information
- Full name: Peter Abraham Sandy Guinari
- Date of birth: 2 June 2001 (age 25)
- Place of birth: Bangui, Central African Republic
- Height: 1.90 m (6 ft 3 in)
- Position: Centre-back

Team information
- Current team: Skalica
- Number: 26

Youth career
- –2011: Phönix München
- 2011–2020: 1860 Munich

Senior career*
Years	Team	Apps	(Gls)
2019–2020	1860 Munich II	9	(0)
2020–2022	FC Pipinsried	29	(1)
2022–2023	Wiltz 71	17	(0)
2024	Telstar	7	(0)
2024	Türkgücü München	5	(0)
2025	Krumovgrad	14	(1)
2025–	Skalica	7	(1)

International career^{‡}
2021–	Central African Republic	15	(0)
- * Club domestic league appearances and goals as of 21 September 2026 ‡ National team caps and goals as of 17 November 2023

Peter Abraham Guinari (born 2 June 2001) is a Central African professional footballer who plays as a centre-back for Slovak First Football League club Skalica and the Central African Republic national team.

== Club career ==
=== Early years ===
Guinari was born in Bangui, Central African Republic and moved to Germany at the age of 10. He began playing football at Phönix München before he was accepted at the youth academy of 1860 Munich. As next step he moved to fifth-tier club Pipinsried in 2020.

=== Wiltz 71 ===
On 28 July 2022, Guinari signed a one-year contract with Luxembourg National Division club Wiltz 71. He made his competitive debut for the club on 7 August, starting in a 1–1 away draw against UN Käerjéng on the first matchday of the season. He made 18 total appearances for the club that season, as Wiltz finished 10th in the league table. He left the club after the season.

=== Telstar ===
Guinari officially joined the Dutch Eerste Divisie club Telstar on 9 January 2024, after obtaining his German passport. Following several months of training with the club, he signed a contract for one-and-a-half years, with an option for an additional year.

He made his debut for de Witte Leeuwen three days after signing, on 12 January 2024, starting in a 1–1 draw against Jong AZ.

His contract was terminated by mutual consent on 17 July 2024.

=== Krumovgrad ===
In January 2025, Guinari signed a contract with Bulgarian A PFG club Krumovgrad.

== International career ==
Guinari made his debut with the Central African Republic national team in a 1–1 2022 FIFA World Cup qualification tie with Cape Verde on 1 September 2021.

== Career statistics ==
As of match played 19 April 2024

Appearances and goals by club, season and competition
Club	Season	League			National cup		Other		Total	
Club	Season	Division	Apps	Goals	Apps	Goals	Apps	Goals	Apps	Goals
1860 Munich II	2020–21	Bayernliga Süd	9	0	—		—		9	0
FC Pipinsried	2020–21	Bayernliga Süd	1	0	—		1 (Note: Appearance(s) in Bavarian Cup)	0	2	0
FC Pipinsried	2021–22	Regionalliga Bayern	29	1	—		1	0	30	1
FC Pipinsried	Total		30	1	—		2	0	32	1
Wiltz 71	2022–23	BGL Ligue	17	0	1	0	—		18	0
Telstar	2023–24	Eerste Divisie	7	0	—		—		7	0
Career total			63	1	1	0	2	0	66	1
