= Martin Černek =

Slovak footballer

Personal information
- Full name: Martin Černek
- Date of birth: 30 December 1994 (age 31)
- Place of birth: Skalica, Slovakia
- Position: Defender

Team information
- Current team: Skalica
- Number: 3

Youth career
- –2013: Skalica
- 2003–2004: → TJ Družstevník Vrádište (loan)

Senior career*
Years	Team	Apps	(Gls)
2013–2016	Skalica		
2015–2016	→ FK Oreské (loan)		
2016–	FK Oreské		
2017–2021	TJ Družstevník Radimov		
2021	→ Skalica (loan)	13	(1)
2021–	Skalica	129	(6)
- * Club domestic league appearances and goals as of 21 September 2026

Martin Černek (born 30 December 1994) is a Slovak professional footballer who plays as a defender for MFK Skalica in the Fortuna Liga.

== Club career ==
=== MFK Skalica ===
Černek made his professional Fortuna Liga debut for MFK Skalica on 17 July 2022 against MFK Ružomberok.
