= Richard Ludha =

Slovak footballer

Personal information
- Date of birth: 8 November 2000 (age 26)
- Place of birth: Prievidza, Slovakia
- Height: 1.96 m (6 ft 5 in)
- Position: Goalkeeper

Team information
- Current team: Skalica
- Number: 1

Youth career
- 2008–2014: Baník Prievidza
- 2014–2017: Železiarne Podbrezová

Senior career*
Years	Team	Apps	(Gls)
2018–2024	Železiarne Podbrezová	108	(0)
2024–2026	Teplice	33	(0)
2025–2026	Teplice B	2	(0)
2026–	Skalica	5	(0)

International career
2021–2022	Slovakia U21	3	(0)
- * Club domestic league appearances and goals as of 21 September 2026

Richard Ludha (born 8 November 2000) is a Slovak footballer who plays for Skalica as a goalkeeper.

== Club career ==
=== FK Železiarne Podbrezová ===
Ludha made his debut for Železiarne Podbrezová against Nitra on 16 February 2019.

=== FK Teplice ===
On 3 January 2024, Ludha signed a three-year contract with Teplice.

== International career ==
Ludha was first recognised in a Slovak senior national team nomination in September 2022, in a premier nomination of newly arriving national team manager Francesco Calzona, ahead of two 2022–23 UEFA Nations League C against Azerbaijan and Belarus. While he was omitted for November friendlies, he also appeared as an alternate for December 2022 national team prospect players' training camp.
