= Pavol Majerník =

Slovak footballer (born 1978)

Personal information
- Full name: Pavol Majerník
- Date of birth: 31 December 1978 (age 47)
- Place of birth: Vrbové, Czechoslovakia
- Height: 1.81 m (5 ft 11 in)
- Position: Centre back

Senior career*
Years	Team	Apps	(Gls)
–2003	ŠKP Devín		
2003–2004	Senec		
2004–2005	Ličartovce		
2005–2008	Košice		
2008–2009	Olympiacos Volos		
2009–2014	Zlaté Moravce	137	(10)
2014–2019	Skalica	34	(1)

International career
2006	Slovakia	1	(0)

Managerial career
- 2017–2022: MFK Skalica (Assistant)
- 2022–2024: MFK Skalica
- 2025–: Šamorín
- * Club domestic league appearances and goals

Pavol Majerník (born 31 December 1978) is a Slovak football manager and former player, who is currently the assistant manager of 2. Liga club FC ŠTK 1914 Šamorín.

== Managerial career ==
=== MFK Skalica ===
On 22 December 2022, it was announced that Majerník would be returning to MFK Skalica, where he had previously played for the team as a player, playing a total of 114 competitive matches for the team. His assistant manager would be Roman Hudec. On 2 September 2024, Majerník left his role as head coach of MFK Skalica after negative results.

=== Šamorín ===
On 19 June 2025, it was announced that Majerník would be joining second division side FC ŠTK 1914 Šamorín, serving as an assistant manager for Albert Rusnák.
