= Tomáš Smejkal =

Czech footballer (born 1998)

Personal information
- Date of birth: 7 July 1998 (age 28)
- Place of birth: Brno, Czech Republic
- Height: 1.77 m (5 ft 10 in)
- Position: Midfielder

Team information
- Current team: MFK Skalica
- Number: 24

Youth career
- 2004−2005: Zbrojovka Brno
- 2005−2008: ČAFC Židenice
- 2008−2009: RAFK Rajhrad
- 2009−2012: Sparta Brno
- 2012−2015: Svratka Brno
- 2013−2014: Vyškov
- 2015−2019: Vysočina Jihlava

Senior career*
Years	Team	Apps	(Gls)
2019−2021	Vysočina Jihlava	41	(10)
2019	→ Líšeň (loan)	13	(5)
2019−2021	Jablonec	27	(0)
2022−2023	→ Vlašim (loan)	27	(7)
2023−2024	Zbrojovka Brno	41	(2)
2025-2026	MFK Skalica	40	(5)
- * Club domestic league appearances and goals as of 25 May 2026

Tomáš Smejkal (born 7 July 1998) is a Czech footballer who currently plays as a midfielder for MFK Skalica.

== Club career ==
Smejkal is a youth graduate of the Jihlava academy, for whom he also made his first league debut. At the beginning of 2019, after an injury, he went on a short loan to Lišně, where he contributed to the team's promotion to the second league. He returned to the second division Jihlava in the 2019/2020 season, where he became part of the starting line-up. While playing for Jablonec, where he had the opportunity to play in the Conference League. He also played on loan for second division club FC Sellier & Bellot Vlašim.

On 20 July 2023, he signed a two-year contract with FC Zbrojovka Brno. In total he made 41 appearances for the Czech club, in which he scored one goal.

=== MFK Skalica ===
On 10 January 2025, it was announced that Smejkal would be joining Slovak club MFK Skalica. He made his debut for the club in a 3–1 loss against Dunajská Streda, starting the game. Smejkal scored his first goal for the club in a 2–0 win over Dukla Banská Bystrica, scoring in the 2” minute.
