= Mestský štadión Skalica =

Football stadium in Skalica, Slovakia

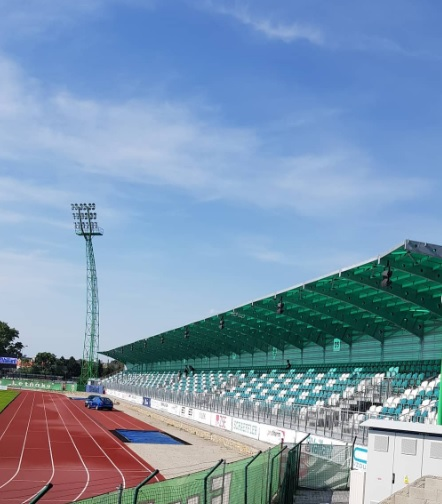
- Interactive map of Mestský štadión Skalica
- Location: Športová 54, 909 01 Skalica, Slovakia
- Coordinates: 48°50′22.33″N 17°13′36.07″E
- Owner: City of Skalica
- Capacity: 3,000
- Surface: Field (Grass)
- Field size: 105 x 68 meters

Construction
- Renovated: 2014

Tenant
- MFK Skalica

The Municipal Stadium (Slovak: Mestský štadión) in Skalica, Slovakia, also colloquially known as Letňák, is a football stadium that serves as the home ground of MFK Skalica and has capacity of 2,494. Western stand has 858 seats, and Eastern Stand has 1,592 seats (including 278 in visitors sector). The stadium is also equipped with a 6-lane 400-meter athletic track.

The municipal stadium situated in Skalica is positioned to the south of the town center, approximately 3 km (2 miles) from the Slovak-Czech border.

== History ==
Prior to 2014, the stadium featured only a single minor grandstand on the west side, but underwent expansion thereafter. Two more covered sections were constructed on either side of the main grandstand, and a small open terrace was established to the east.

== International matches ==
UEFA Euro U21 qualification:

Slovakia U21 3:0 Andorra U21 (Sep 5, 2025), Goals: 17. min Griger (pen., 1:0), 86. min Sovič (2:0), 90+2. min Riznič (3:0)

== See also ==
- List of football stadiums in Slovakia
