= Martin Junas =

Slovak footballer

Personal information
- Full name: Martin Junas
- Date of birth: 9 March 1996 (age 30)
- Place of birth: Skalica, Slovakia
- Height: 1.87 m (6 ft 2 in)
- Position: Goalkeeper

Team information
- Current team: Skalica
- Number: 39

Youth career
- Senica

Senior career*
Years	Team	Apps	(Gls)
2014–2017	Senica	7	(0)
2016–2017	→ Topvar Topoľčany (loan)	?	(?)
2017–2018	Břeclav	?	(?)
2018–	Skalica	218	(0)

International career
2012–2013	Slovakia U17	13	(0)
2014–2015	Slovakia U19	1	(0)
- * Club domestic league appearances and goals as of 25 May 2026

Martin Junas (born 9 March 1996) is a Slovak footballer who currently plays for Skalica as a goalkeeper.

== Club career ==
=== FK Senica ===
Junas made his professional Fortuna Liga debut for Senica on 30 May 2015 against ŽP Šport Podbrezová.
