= David Oulehla =

Czech football coach (born 1983)

Personal information
- Date of birth: September 26, 1983 (age 43)
- Place of birth: Czech Republic

Team information
- Current team: Viagem Ústí nad Labem (manager)

Managerial career
- Years: Team
- 2016–2018: Viktoria Žižkov (assistant manager)
- 2018–2020: FK Varnsdorf
- 2021: Viktoria Žižkov
- 2022–2023: Baník Ostrava (assistant manager)
- 2023–2024: Vysočina Jihlava
- 2024–2025: MFK Skalica
- 2026–: Viagem Ústí nad Labem

David Oulehla (born 26 September 1983) is a Czech football manager, who is currently the manager of Czech National Football League club FK Viagem Ústí nad Labem.

== Coaching career ==
=== Early career ===
Oulehla started coaching at FC Vysočina, where he trained the U17 youth players until the summer of 2014. He then moved to the Jablonec U19 team. He started his coaching career in league football as an assistant at Viktoria Žižkov, where he worked from 2016 to 2018. He then accepted the offer of head coach from the second-league FK Varnsdorf, which he led from 2018 to 2020. In December 2020, Oulehla returned to the Žižkov bench, from where he was dismissed in October 2021. He found a new job in the summer of 2022, when he joined as an assistant coach to Pavel Vrba at Baník Ostrava. He remained in the same position under Pavel Hapal, but only until March, when he left the team by mutual agreement.

=== Vysočina Jihlava ===
On 3 May 2023, Oulehla became the new manager of Czech club FC Vysočina Jihlava. On 28 August 2024, Oulehla was dismissed from his position as coach of the Czech second-division football team FC Vysočina. The game that led to his departure was a 3–2 cup loss on penalties (8–7) – Jihlava was eliminated from the Czech Cup in the first round against 4th league side FC Žďas Žďár nad Sázavou. In 2024, he coached the FC Vysočina team in 22 duels with a record of two wins, 7 draws and 13 losses.

=== Skalica ===
In September of 2024, it was announced that Oulehla would be becoming the manager of Slovak first league club MFK Skalica. In his first season he took over the team, Oulehla led Skalica to a final 9th place in the table with 38 points. On 5 May 2025, he signed a 2 year-extension to his contract with Skalica.

Oulehla was sacked by Skalica after a loss in the 16th round of the first league away to Tatran Prešov. He led Skalica as head coach in 43 league matches and in six Slovnaft Cup matches. Under the leadership of Oulehla in the 2025–2026 season, the Skalica team recorded eight losses, six draws and two wins up to that point of the season.

=== Ústí nad Labem ===
On 11 June 2026, Oulehla was appointed manager of Czech National Football League club Viagem Ústí nad Labem.
