= Martin Nagy (footballer) =

Slovak footballer

Personal information
- Full name: Martin Nagy
- Date of birth: 5 September 1990 (age 36)
- Place of birth: Popudinské Močidľany, Czechoslovakia
- Height: 1.75 m (5 ft 9 in)
- Position: Midfielder

Team information
- Current team: Skalica
- Number: 18

Youth career
- 2006–2011: Ružomberok

Senior career*
Years	Team	Apps	(Gls)
2011–2017	Ružomberok	153	(4)
2017	ETO Győr	4	(0)
2018–	Skalica	208	(17)
- * Club domestic league appearances and goals as of 25 May 2026

Martin Nagy (born 5 September 1990) is a Slovak professional football player who currently plays as a midfielder for Slovak First Football League side MFK Skalica.

== Club career ==
Nagy made his official debut for Ružomberok on 21 May 2011, coming in as a substitute in a 3–2 home win against Senica. At his time with Ružomberok, he captained the team.

Nagy received an injury, when he did not finish the match against Trenčín. He made his return after injury in 6th round of the relegation group against his former club Ružomberok. He ran onto the field for the first time after the injury, specifically in the 55th minute. Nagy would go on to score a goal in the 95th minute, deciding the 1–0 victory. Skalica gained three important points from the point of view of the fight for survival.
