= MFK Skalica =

Slovak football club

Skalica
- Logo used as of 2024
- Full name: Mestský futbalový klub Skalica
- Founded: 1920; 106 years ago (as ŠK Skalica)
- Ground: Mestský štadión Skalica, Skalica
- Capacity: 2,494
- President: Peter Bartoš
- Head coach: Stanislav Macek
- League: Slovak First Football League
- 2025–26: 9th of 12
- Website: www.mfkskalica.sk
Home colours	Away colours

MFK Skalica is a Slovak football team, based in the town of Skalica. The club was founded in 1920. The club plays in the Fortuna Liga, the top tier of Slovak football, and hosts home games at the Mestský štadión Skalica.

The club colors since the foundation of ŠK Skalica have been and still are white and green.

== History ==
- 1920–1945 Founded as ŠK Skalica
- 1945–1953 Renamed Sokol Tekla Skalica
- 1953–1963 Renamed DŠO Tatran Skalica
- 1963–1990 Renamed TJ ZVL Skalica
- 1990–2006 Renamed Športový klub ŠK Skalica
- 2006–present Renamed MFK Skalica

=== Early years ===
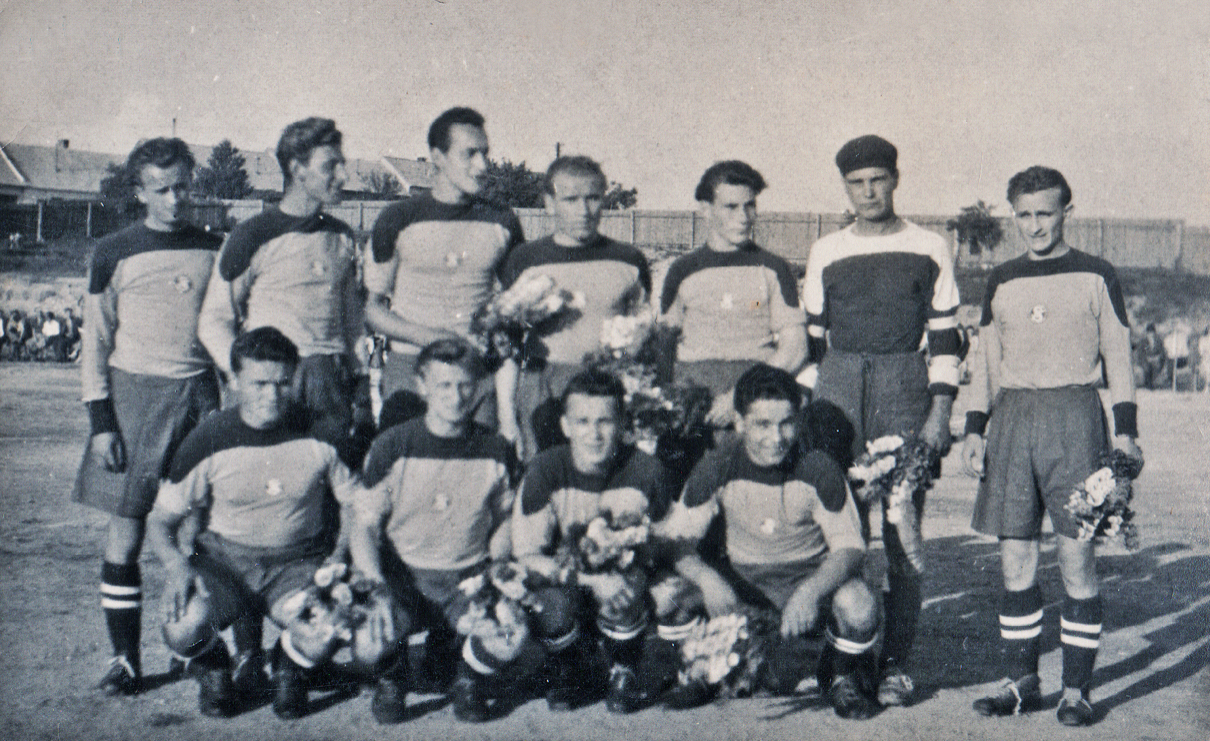
Skalica players in 1921.

The beginnings of football in Skalica date back to 1918, when it was played on the field near the railway station, but it was only after the foundation of ŠK Skalica in 1920 that football in Skalica began to develop. At that time, the club maintained close ties with football teams in neighboring Moravia. On April 6, 1921, the Sports Club's founding meeting was held in the hotel, and on June 4 of the same year, the founding general meeting was held. In 1924, large investments were made in the field that the Sports Club used. At that time, many matches were already being played in Skalica.

=== Promotion to First Division: 2015–2016 ===
MFK Skalica reached Fortuna Liga despite defeat 0:2 by MFK Zemplín Michalovce in closing match of 2. Liga on 13 June 2015 and they surprised everyone by securing the second spot in the league and securing the first historical promotion to the highest football tier in Slovakia as well as MFK Zemplín Michalovce. Skalica replaced FC VSS Košice in the competition, which was relegated despite finishing 6th in the table due to financial problems. Skalica thus achieved the greatest success in its history. In its first season in the top flight, they finished in 12th place and was relegated to the 2nd league after getting 24 points from 33 games.

=== Success in the Slovak Cup: 2016–2017 ===
While still playing in the 2. Liga, Skalica was able to get to the final of the 2016–17 Slovak Cup, where they met with ŠK Slovan Bratislava, to which Skalica ultimately lost 3–0 in the Poprad stadium.

=== Recent years: 2022–present ===
Club logo used until 2024.

In 2022, Skalica was promoted again to the top flight, replacing FK Senica, who were not granted a license for this competition. In their return to the league, Skalica avoided relegation after getting 40 points in 32 games, finishing in 8th place altogether. In 2024, the club’s logo was rebranded. In 2025, Mário Hollý, Skalica’s starting midfielder, got a 3 month ban for kicking an assistant referee.

== Honours ==
=== Domestic ===
- Slovak Second Division
  - Runners-up (2): 2014–15 (Promoted), 2017–18
- Slovak Cup (1961–present)
  - Runners-Up (1): 2016–17

== Sponsorship ==
Period	Kit manufacturer	Shirt sponsor
2015–2020	Nike	none
2020–2022	Puma	none
2022–present	Puma	Tipsport

== Current squad ==
As of 23 August 2026 Note: Flags indicate national team as defined under FIFA eligibility rules; some limited exceptions apply. Players may hold more than one non-FIFA nationality.

No.	Pos.	Nation	Player
1	GK	SVK	Richard Ludha
3	DF	SVK	Martin Černek
4	DF	GER	Maurizio Macorig
5	DF	SVK	Martin Rýzek (on loan from (Czech Republic) Slovan Liberec)
6	MF	SVK	Patrick Karhan (on loan from Spartak Trnava)
7	FW	NGR	Philip Onyedika
8	MF	SVK	Lukáš Šimko
9	MF	SVK	Adam Morong
10	MF	GEO	Levan Nonikashvili
11	MF	SVK	Adam Križan
13	DF	SVK	Samuel Sula
14	MF	SVK	Michal Gulíšek
17	MF	CZE	Petr Pudhorocký (on loan from (Czech Republic) Hradec Králové)

No.	Pos.	Nation	Player
18	MF	SVK	Martin Nagy (Captain)
19	MF	SVK	Martin Mášik
20	DF	SVK	Oliver Podhorín
21	MF	SVK	Adam Ravas
26	DF	CAF	Peter Guinari
27	MF	SVK	Damian Baris
30	MF	NGR	Abbati Abdullahi (on loan from (Poland) Górnik Zabrze)
33	GK	SVK	Erik Riska
34	FW	GER	Ephraim Eshele
39	GK	SVK	Martin Junas
77	FW	CZE	Erik Daniel
91	FW	CZE	Roman Potočný

For recent transfers, see List of Slovak football transfers summer 2026

=== Out on loan ===
Note: Flags indicate national team as defined under FIFA eligibility rules; some limited exceptions apply. Players may hold more than one non-FIFA nationality.

No. / Pos. / Nation / Player; 22 / MF / SVK / Mário Hollý (on loan at Tatran Prešov)	No. / Pos. / Nation / Player

== Management Staff ==
Position	Staff
Manager	(Slovakia) Stanislav Macek
Assistant coach	(Slovakia) TBA
Goalkeeper coach	(Slovakia) Andrej Fišan
Team manager	(Slovakia) Stanislav Salajka
Team doctor	(Slovakia) Mudr. Ján Maják
Masseur	(Slovakia) Jozef Hrtús
Security manager	(Slovakia) Aleš Biskupič

== Notable players ==
Had international caps for their respective countries. Players whose name is listed in bold represented their countries while playing for Skalica.

- (Slovakia) Martin Dobrotka
- (Slovakia) Ľuboš Hajdúch
- (Nigeria) Ikenna Hilary
- (Finland) Matej Hradecky
- (Slovakia) Pavol Majerník
- (Slovakia) Jaroslav Mihalík
- (Slovakia) Branislav Niňaj
- (Slovakia) Juraj Piroska
- (Slovakia) Blažej Vaščák

== Managers ==
- (Slovakia) Štefan Horný (2012–30 June 2015)
- (Czech Republic) Aleš Křeček (3 July 2015 – 28 Oct 2015)
- (Slovakia) Štefan Horný (28 Oct 2015 – 31 May 2016)
- (Slovakia) Jozef Kostelník (May 2016–July 2018)
- (Slovakia) Jozef Dojčan (July 2018-July 2019)
- (Slovakia) Jozef Kostelník (July 2019-May 2022)
- (Slovakia) Juraj Jarábek (May 2022 – Dec 2022)
- (Slovakia) Pavol Majerník (Dec 2022 – Sept 2024)
- (Czech Republic) David Oulehla (Sept 2024 – Nov 2025)
- (Slovakia) Roman Hudec (Nov 2025 – Sep 2026)
- (Slovakia) Stanislav Macek (Sep 2026 - )
