= 2019–20 ŠK Slovan Bratislava season =

Slovan Bratislava
2019–20 season
- Chairman: Ivan Kmotrík
- Head coach: Martin Ševela (until 18 July 2019); Vladimir Radenković (interim, from 19 July 2019 to 24 July 2019); Ján Kozák Jr. (from 25 July 2019)
- Stadium: Tehelné pole
- Slovak 1st League: 1st
- Slovak Cup: Winners
- UEFA Champions League: First qualifying round
- UEFA Europa League: Group stage
- Top goalscorer: League: Andraž Šporar (12); All: Andraž Šporar (20)
- Highest home attendance: 20,333 (Note: This match was officially behind closed doors due to UEFA sanctions against the home team. Under UEFA rules children aged under 14 were still allowed to attend such games (free of charge), with one adult for every 10 children also allowed entry to act as a supervisor.) (24 Oct 2019 v Wolverhampton Wanderers, EL GS); 20,233 (22 Aug 2019 v PAOK, EL PO)
- Lowest home attendance: 252 (Note: Limited capacity due to COVID-19 pandemic measures. Due to hygienic measures, the number of spectators at individual matches was limited. Until 30 June, a maximum of 500 spectators could be present at the stadiums, which, however, also included the teams' staff, the media or stewards. From 1 July, the number of spectators allowed to attend a match was increased to 50% of a stadium's capacity.) (16 Jun 2020 v Zlaté Moravce, SC SF); 253 (13 Jun 2020 v Ružomberok, FL Round 23); 560 (Note: This match was officially behind closed doors due to SFZ sanctions against the home team. Under SFZ rules children aged under 15 were still allowed to attend such games (free of charge), with one adult for every 10 children also allowed entry to act as a supervisor.) (28 Sep 2019 v Nitra, FL Round 10); 3,561 (4 Jul 2020 v Zemplín Michalovce, FL Round 26)
- Biggest win: 7–0 (12 Oct 2019 v Oravská Poruba, SC Round 3)
- Biggest defeat: 2–5 (1 Sep 2019 v DAC Dunajská Streda, FL Round 7)
Home colours	Away colours

The 2019–20 season was ŠK Slovan Bratislava's 14th consecutive in the top flight of Slovak football.

Having won the 2018–19 Slovak First Football League, Slovan contested the UEFA Champions League, but were eliminated in the first qualifying round. Subsequently, Slovan competed in the UEFA Europa League and reached the group stage.

Slovan were successful in their defence of the Slovak Super Liga clinching the title on 20 June. The club completed the domestic double on 8 July by winning the Slovak Cup.

The season covers the period from 1 June 2019 to July 2020.

== Players ==
As of 11 July 2020

Squad No.	Name	Nationality	Position(s)	Date of birth (age)
Goalkeepers
1	Dominik Greif	(Slovakia)	GK	6 April 1997 (age 29)
22	Matúš Ružinský	(Slovakia)	GK	15 January 1992 (age 34)
30	Michal Šulla	(Slovakia)	GK	15 July 1991 (age 35)
31	Martin Trnovský	(Slovakia)	GK	7 June 2000 (age 26)
Defenders
2	Mitch Apau	(Netherlands)	RB	27 April 1990 (age 36)
14	Myenty Abena	(Netherlands)	CB	12 December 1994 (age 31)
17	Jurij Medveděv	(Czech Republic)	RB	18 June 1996 (age 30)
25	Lukáš Pauschek	(Slovakia)	RB	9 December 1992 (age 33)
29	Vasil Bozhikov (captain)	(Bulgaria)	CB / LB	2 June 1988 (age 38)
36	Lucas Lovat	(Brazil)	LB	15 January 1997 (age 29)
66	Kenan Bajrić	(Slovenia)	CB / DM	20 December 1994 (age 31)
81	Vernon De Marco	(Argentina)	LB / CB	18 November 1992 (age 33)
—	Artem Sukhotskyi (out on loan at (Belarus) Dinamo Minsk)	(Ukraine)	LB	6 December 1992 (age 33)
Midfielders
4	Alen Mustafić (on loan from (Bosnia and Herzegovina) Sarajevo)	(Bosnia and Herzegovina)	DM / CM	5 July 1999 (age 27)
6	Joeri de Kamps	(Netherlands)	DM / CM	10 February 1992 (age 34)
7	Moha	(Morocco)	LW	15 September 1993 (age 33)
10	Ibrahim Rabiu	(Nigeria)	CM / CAM	15 March 1991 (age 35)
20	Erik Daniel	(Czech Republic)	RW	4 February 1992 (age 34)
24	Nono	(Spain)	CM / DM	30 March 1993 (age 33)
26	Filip Lichý	(Slovakia)	CM	25 January 2001 (age 25)
27	Dávid Holman	(Hungary)	CAM	17 March 1993 (age 33)
77	Aleksandar Čavrić	(Serbia)	RW	18 May 1994 (age 32)
79	Vladimír Weiss Jr.	(Slovakia)	RW / LW / CAM	30 November 1989 (age 36)
—	Dejan Dražić (out on loan at (Poland) Zagłębie Lubin)	(Serbia)	RW / LW / CAM	26 September 1995 (age 31)
—	David Hrnčár (out on loan at (Slovakia) Zlaté Moravce)	(Slovakia)	RW	10 December 1997 (age 28)
—	Denis Potoma (out on loan at (Slovakia) Sereď)	(Slovakia)	CAM	15 February 2000 (age 26)
Forwards
9	Ezekiel Henty	(Nigeria)	ST / RW / LW / CAM	13 May 1993 (age 33)
12	Alen Ožbolt	(Slovenia)	ST	24 June 1996 (age 30)
15	David Strelec	(Slovakia)	ST / CAM	4 April 2001 (age 25)
21	Rafael Ratão	(Brazil)	ST / CAM / RW / LW	30 November 1995 (age 30)
55	Žan Medved	(Slovenia)	ST	14 June 1999 (age 27)
99	Georgios Tzovaras	(Greece)	ST	3 November 1999 (age 27)
—	Boris Cmiljanić (out on loan at (Slovakia) Zlaté Moravce)	(Montenegro)	ST / RW / LW	17 March 1996 (age 30)

== Transfers and loans ==
=== Transfers in ===
Entry date	Position	Nationality	Name	From	Fee	Ref.
15 June 2019	GK	(Slovakia)	Matúš Ružinský	(Slovakia) Šamorín	Loan return	
30 June 2019	DF	(Argentina)	Vernon De Marco	(Poland) Lech Poznań	Loan return	
30 June 2019	MF	(Slovakia)	David Hrnčár	(Slovakia) Pohronie	Loan return	
1 July 2019	MF	(Czech Republic)	Erik Daniel	(Slovakia) Ružomberok	Free transfer	
1 July 2019	DF	(Netherlands)	Myenty Abena	(Slovakia) Spartak Trnava	Free transfer	
1 July 2019	FW	(Greece)	Georgios Tzovaras	(Greece) PAOK	€100,000 (Note: Unofficial fee.)	
14 October 2019	DF	(Slovakia)	Lukáš Pauschek	(Czech Republic) Mladá Boleslav	Free transfer	
10 January 2020	FW	(Slovenia)	Žan Medved	(Slovenia) Olimpija Ljubljana	Undisclosed	
11 January 2020	FW	(Slovenia)	Alen Ožbolt	(Bulgaria) Lokomotiv Plovdiv	€350,000 (Note: Unofficial fee.)	
15 January 2020	DF	(Brazil)	Lucas Lovat	(Slovakia) Spartak Trnava	€300,000 (Note: Unofficial fee.)	
24 January 2020	FW	(Nigeria)	Ezekiel Henty	(Hungary) Puskás Akadémia	Free transfer	
3 February 2020	FW	(Brazil)	Rafael Ratão	(Ukraine) Zorya Luhansk	Undisclosed	
24 February 2020	MF	(Slovakia)	Vladimír Weiss Jr.	Free agent		

=== Loans in ===
Start date	Position	Nationality	Name	From	End date	Ref.
4 July 2019	FW	(Brazil)	Rafael Ratão	(Ukraine) Zorya Luhansk	31 December 2019	
24 January 2020	MF	(Bosnia and Herzegovina)	Alen Mustafić	(Bosnia and Herzegovina) Sarajevo	12 July 2020	

=== Transfers out ===
Exit date	Position	Nationality	Name	To	Fee	Ref.
1 July 2019	DF	(Austria)	Stefan Stangl	Released		
1 January 2020	DF	(Hungary)	Richárd Guzmics	(Hungary) Mezőkövesd	Free transfer	
23 January 2020	FW	(Slovenia)	Andraž Šporar	(Portugal) Sporting CP	€6,000,000 (Note: Fee may have eventually risen up to €7,000,000 with achievable bonuses.) (Note: At that time, the most expensive transfer in the history of the club and the Slovak league.)	

=== Loans out ===
Start date	Position	Nationality	Name	To	End date	Ref.
20 July 2019	MF	(Slovakia)	David Hrnčár	(Slovakia) Pohronie	22 January 2020	
1 February 2020	MF	(Slovakia)	David Hrnčár	(Slovakia) Zlaté Moravce	17 July 2020	
8 August 2019	FW	(Montenegro)	Boris Cmiljanić	(Austria) Admira	21 February 2020	
26 February 2020	FW	(Montenegro)	Boris Cmiljanić	(Slovakia) Zlaté Moravce	11 July 2020	
20 February 2020	MF	(Slovakia)	Denis Potoma	(Slovakia) Sereď	18 July 2020	
28 February 2020	MF	(Serbia)	Dejan Dražić	(Poland) Zagłębie Lubin	20 July 2020	
13 March 2020	DF	(Ukraine)	Artem Sukhotskyi	(Belarus) Dinamo Minsk	1 December 2020	

== Friendlies ==
Win Draw Loss

=== Pre-season ===
Saturday, 15 June 2019	Komárno (Slovakia)	0–3	(Slovakia) Slovan Bratislava	Komárno, Slovakia
14:30 CEST (UTC+02:00)	Valach (yellow card) 45'	Report	Čavrić 42', 87'; Moha 68'

Tuesday, 18 June 2019	Slovan Bratislava (Slovakia)	1–1	(Czech Republic) Slovácko	Malacky, Slovakia
17:00 CEST (UTC+02:00)	Ratão 42'	Report	Vasiljev 32'

Saturday, 22 June 2019	Slovan Bratislava (Slovakia)	3–2	(Czech Republic) Baník Ostrava	Bratislava, Slovakia
18:00 CEST (UTC+02:00)	Dražić 14'; Ratão 28'; Cmiljanić, (yellow card) 73'	Report	Holzer 1'; Celba (yellow card) 17'; Kaloč 50'	Stadium: Pasienky; Attendance: 1,550

Tuesday, 25 June 2019	Slovan Bratislava (Slovakia)	3–1	(Czech Republic) Bohemians 1905	Bratislava, Slovakia
16:00 CEST (UTC+02:00)	Ratão 5', 53'; Dražić 43'	Report	Koubek 84'	Stadium: Pasienky

Sunday, 30 June 2019 Pohár Ferdinanda Daučíka	Slovan Bratislava (Slovakia)	3–2	(Czech Republic) Slavia Prague	Bratislava, Slovakia
18:00 CEST (UTC+02:00)	Moha 24'; Šporar 45'; Dražić (yellow card) 52', (goal) 69'	Report	Souček (yellow card) 29', (goal) 53', 59'	Stadium: Tehelné pole Attendance: 5,950

Wednesday, 3 July 2019	Slovan Bratislava (Slovakia)	2–0	(Austria) St. Pölten	Bratislava, Slovakia
18:00 CEST (UTC+02:00)	De Marco (yellow card) 39'; Abena 68', 75'	Report	Gartler (yellow card) 37'	Stadium: Pasienky

Saturday, 13 July 2019	Slovan Bratislava (Slovakia)	4–0	(Austria) Hartberg	Bratislava, Slovakia
18:00 CEST (UTC+02:00)	Abena 2'; Daniel 51'; Nono 67'; Cmiljanić 75' (pen.)	Report		Stadium: Pasienky

=== Mid-season ===
Saturday, 18 January 2020	Orenburg (Russia)	0–1	(Slovakia) Slovan Bratislava	Belek, Turkey
15:00 CET (UTC+01:00)		Report	Moha 6'

Wednesday, 22 January 2020	Wisła Płock (Poland)	0–3	(Slovakia) Slovan Bratislava	Belek, Turkey
14:00 CET (UTC+01:00)		Report	Medved 16'; Nono 23'; Daniel 41'

Saturday, 25 January 2020	Rubin Kazan (Russia)	2–1	(Slovakia) Slovan Bratislava	Belek, Turkey
10:00 CET (UTC+01:00)	Tarasov 42'; Zuyev 84'	Report	Mustafić 66'

Wednesday, 29 January 2020	Karpaty Lviv (Ukraine)	1–1	(Slovakia) Slovan Bratislava	Belek, Turkey
13:00 CET (UTC+01:00)	Dubinchak (red card) 26' (substitution was enabled); Nazaryna 89' (pen.)	Report	Moha 3'; Lovat (yellow card) 88'

Wednesday, 29 January 2020	Dynamo Brest (Belarus)	1–0	(Slovakia) Slovan Bratislava	Belek, Turkey
15:30 CET (UTC+01:00)	Sadovsky 82'	Report	Nono (red card) (substitution was enabled)

Saturday, 1 February 2020	Zhetysu (Kazakhstan)	1–1	(Slovakia) Slovan Bratislava	Belek, Turkey
13:00 CET (UTC+01:00)	Altynbekov 4'	Report	Dražić 22' (pen.)

Saturday, 1 February 2020	Olimpija Ljubljana (Slovenia)	1–2	(Slovakia) Slovan Bratislava	Belek, Turkey
16:00 CET (UTC+01:00)	Putinčanin 36'	Report	Ratão 6'; Moha 60'

Friday, 7 February 2020	Freiberg (Germany)	1–0	(Slovakia) Slovan Bratislava	Belek, Turkey
09:00 CET (UTC+01:00)	Kutlu 12'	Report

Friday, 7 February 2020	Ludogorets Razgrad (Bulgaria)	1–1	(Slovakia) Slovan Bratislava	Belek, Turkey
15:00 CET (UTC+01:00)	Jorginho 65'	Report	Bajrić (yellow card) 33'; Nono 62'

=== On-season ===
Saturday, 23 May 2020	Slovan Bratislava (Slovakia)	0–0	(Slovakia) Senica	Bratislava, Slovakia
11:00 CEST (UTC+02:00)		Report	Lukáčik (yellow card) 48'; Buchel (yellow card) 82'	Stadium: Tehelné pole

Friday, 29 May 2020	Slovan Bratislava (Slovakia)	2–0	(Slovakia) Sereď	Bratislava, Slovakia
11:30 CEST (UTC+02:00)	Henty 6'; Holman 73' (pen.)	Report		Stadium: Pasienky

Wednesday, 3 June 2020	Slovan Bratislava (Slovakia)	2–1	(Slovakia) Nitra	Bratislava, Slovakia
16:00 CEST (UTC+02:00)	Ožbolt 14'; Weiss Jr. 89'	Report	Ristovski 21' (pen.)	Stadium: Pasienky

Saturday, 6 June 2020	Slovan Bratislava (Slovakia)	2–0	(Slovakia) Pohronie	Bratislava, Slovakia
14:00 CEST (UTC+02:00)	Abena 45+1'; Moha 54'	Report		Stadium: Tehelné pole

== Competition overview ==
Competition	First match	Last match	Starting round	Final position	Record							
Competition	First match	Last match	Starting round	Final position	Pld	W	D	L	GF	GA	GD	Win %
Fortuna liga	20 July 2019	11 July 2020	Matchday 1	1st	27	21	5	1	57	14	+43	77.78
Slovak Cup	9 October 2019	8 July 2020	Second round	Winners	8	7	1	0	27	5	+22	87.50
Champions League	10 July 2019	17 July 2019	First qualifying round	First qualifying round	2	0	2	0	2	2	+0	0.00
Europa League	24 July 2019	12 December 2019	Second qualifying round	Group stage	12	6	1	5	21	18	+3	50.00
Total					49	34	9	6	107	39	+68	69.39

Source: Competitions

== Fortuna liga ==
=== League table ===
==== Regular stage ====
Pos	Team	Pld	W	D	L	GF	GA	GD	Pts	Qualification
1	Slovan Bratislava	22	17	4	1	46	11	+35	55	Qualification for the championship group
2	Žilina	22	13	6	3	38	17	+21	45	Qualification for the championship group
3	DAC Dunajská Streda	22	11	5	6	31	25	+6	38	Qualification for the championship group
4	Spartak Trnava	22	9	3	10	25	26	−1	30	Qualification for the championship group
5	Zemplín Michalovce	22	8	6	8	28	32	−4	30	Qualification for the championship group
6	Ružomberok	22	6	10	6	25	27	−2	28	Qualification for the championship group

Source: Niké liga (in Slovak)
Rules for classification: 1) Points; 2) Head-to-head points; 3) Head-to-head goal difference; 4) Head-to-head away goals scored; 5) Play-off.

==== Championship group ====
The championship group was originally supposed to have 10 rounds starting on 14 March 2020. Due to the coronavirus pandemic, all matches were initially postponed, and on 22 May 2020, the league committee approved a five-round format and created a new schedule.

Pos	Team	Pld	W	D	L	GF	GA	GD	Pts	Qualification	SLO	ŽIL	DAC	TRN	RUŽ	ZMI
1	Slovan Bratislava (C)	27	21	5	1	57	14	+43	68	Qualification for the Champions League first qualifying round	—	—	—	0–0	1–0	4–0
2	Žilina	27	15	6	6	48	25	+23	51	Qualification for the Europa League first qualifying round	2–3	—	—	2–1	—	5–0
3	DAC Dunajská Streda	27	15	5	7	42	28	+14	50	Qualification for the Europa League first qualifying round	1–3	2–0	—	—	—	5–0
4	Spartak Trnava	27	10	5	12	30	32	−2	35	Qualification for the Europa League play-offs	—	—	0–2	—	2–0	—
5	Ružomberok (O)	27	7	11	9	28	33	−5	32 (Note: Head-to-head points: Ružomberok 5, Zemplín Michalovce 2.)	Qualification for the Europa League play-offs	—	2–1	0–1	—	—	—
6	Zemplín Michalovce	27	8	8	11	31	49	−18	32	Qualification for the Europa League play-offs	—	—	—	2–2	1–1	—

Source: Niké liga (in Slovak)
Legend: Blue = home team win; Yellow = draw; Red = away team win.
Rules for classification: 1) Points; 2) Head-to-head points; 3) Head-to-head goal difference; 4) Head-to-head away goals scored; 5) Play-off.
(C) Champions; (O) Play-off winners

=== Results summary ===
Overall								Home						Away					
Pld	W	D	L	GF	GA	GD	Pts	W	D	L	GF	GA	GD	W	D	L	GF	GA	GD
27	21	5	1	57	14	+43	68	12	2	0	31	2	+29	9	3	1	26	12	+14

=== Results by matchday ===
Round	1	2	3	4	5	6	7	8	9	10	11	12	13	14	15	16	17	18	19	20	21	22	23	24	25	26	27
Ground	A	H	A	H	A	H	A	H	A	H	A	H	A	H	A	H	A	H	A	H	A	H	H	A	A	H	H
Result	W	W	W	W	W	D	L	W	W	W	D	W	W	W	W	W	D	W	D	W	W	W	W	W	W	W	D
Position	2	3	1	1	1	1	2	2	2	1	1	1	1	1	1	1	1	1	1	1	1	1	1	1	1	1	1
Points	3	6	9	12	15	16	16	19	22	25	26	29	32	35	38	41	42	45	46	49	52	55	58	61	64	67	68

A = Away; H = Home; W = Win; D = Draw; L = Loss

=== Matches ===
Regular stage

Saturday, 20 July 2019 1	Pohronie	1–3	Slovan Bratislava	Žiar nad Hronom
20:00 CEST (UTC+02:00)	Nosko (yellow card) 39'; Jacko (yellow card) 47'; Tesák (yellow card) 53'; Abrahám 65'	Report	Čavrić 8'; Šporar 53' (pen.), 85'; Dražić (yellow card) 82'	Stadium: Futbalový štadión Žiar nad Hronom; Attendance: 2,602

Saturday, 27 July 2019 2	Slovan Bratislava	3–0	Zemplín Michalovce	Bratislava
20:00 CEST (UTC+02:00)	Abena 1', (yellow card) 10'; Daniel 21'; Moha 70'	Report	Petro (yellow card) 33'; Grič (yellow card) 65'	Stadium: Tehelné pole Attendance: 5,580

Saturday, 3 August 2019 3	Senica	0–3	Slovan Bratislava	Senica
18:00 CEST (UTC+02:00)	Cvek (yellow card) 72'; Krč (yellow card) 78'; Ramírez (yellow card) 79'	Report	Nono 5'; Ratão 33'; Čavrić 63'	Stadium: Štadión FK Senica; Attendance: 1,760

Saturday, 10 August 2019 4	Slovan Bratislava	4–0	Zlaté Moravce	Bratislava
19:00 CEST (UTC+02:00)	Rabiu (yellow card) 32'; Holman 35' de Kamps (yellow card) 45'; Sukhotskyi 48'; Apau (yellow card) 52'; Nono 65'; Strelec 85' (pen.)	Report	Kovaľ (yellow card) 33'; Grozdanovski (yellow card) 59'	Stadium: Tehelné pole Attendance: 4,520

Saturday, 17 August 2019 5	Sereď	0–4	Slovan Bratislava	Myjava
19:00 CEST (UTC+02:00)	Jureškin (yellow card) 49'; Hučko (yellow card) 52'; Slaninka (yellow card) 89'	Report	Bajrić 24'; Sukhotskyi 42'; Šporar 65'; Ratão 90+2'	Stadium: Štadión Spartaka Myjava; Attendance: 694

Sunday, 25 August 2019 6	Slovan Bratislava	1–1	Žilina	Bratislava
17:30 CEST (UTC+02:00)	Ratão (penalty missed) 37', 37'; Apau (yellow card) 79'	Report	Holec (yellow card) 35'; Káčer 80' (pen.); Balaj (yellow card) 88'	Stadium: Tehelné pole Attendance: 7,850

Sunday, 1 September 2019 7	DAC Dunajská Streda	5–2	Slovan Bratislava	Dunajská Streda
18:00 CEST (UTC+02:00)	Davis 36' (pen.); K. Vida 45+2'; Ramírez 52', 75'; Koštrna (yellow card) 57'; Fábry 68'; Oravec (yellow card) 86'	Report	Šporar 18' (pen.) de Kamps (red card) 35'; Sukhotskyi (yellow card) 43'; Abena (yellow card) 47', (goal) 54'; Ljubičić (yellow card) 83'	Stadium: MOL Aréna; Attendance: 11,679

Sunday, 15 September 2019 8	Slovan Bratislava	2–0	Spartak Trnava	Bratislava
18:00 CEST (UTC+02:00)	Daniel (yellow card) 9'; Šporar 20', (yellow card) 90+3'; Rabiu (yellow card) 75'; Medveděv (yellow card) 86'; Dražić 90+2'	Report	Sobczyk (yellow card) 8'; Mesík (yellow card) 25' (yellow-red card) 47'; Rusov (yellow card) 90+3'	Stadium: Tehelné pole Attendance: 14,933

Sunday, 22 September 2019 9	Trenčín	2–4	Slovan Bratislava	Žilina
18:00 CEST (UTC+02:00)	Zubairu (yellow card) 34'; Roguljić 37' van Kessel 46'	Report	Šporar 25', 74'; Strelec 29', 56' de Kamps (yellow card) 70'; Nono (yellow card) 75'	Stadium: Štadión pod Dubňom; Attendance: 965

Saturday, 28 September 2019 10	Slovan Bratislava	5–0	Nitra	Bratislava
19:00 CEST (UTC+02:00)	Holman 39', 40', 53', (penalty missed) 53'; Strelec 67'; Nono 86'	Report	Gatarić (yellow card) 42'	Stadium: Tehelné pole Attendance: 560

Sunday, 6 October 2019 11	Ružomberok	1–1	Slovan Bratislava	Ružomberok
18:00 CEST (UTC+02:00)	Bobček 39'; Zsigmund (yellow card) 76'; Kostadinov (yellow card) 90+2'; Regáli (yellow card) 90+3'	Report	Holman (yellow card) 84'; Šporar 84'	Stadium: Štadión pod Čebraťom; Attendance: 2,086

Saturday, 19 October 2019 12	Slovan Bratislava	2–1	Pohronie	Bratislava
17:00 CEST (UTC+02:00)	Ratão 40'; Moha 78'	Report	Sedláček (yellow card) 79'; Zachara 80'	Stadium: Tehelné pole Attendance: 5,379

Sunday, 27 October 2019 13	Zemplín Michalovce	0–1	Slovan Bratislava	Michalovce
17:00 CET (UTC+01:00)	Kolesár (yellow card) 57'; Kira (yellow card) 87'	Report	De Marco (yellow card) 4'; Šporar 29'; Ljubičić (yellow card) 75'; Šulla (yellow card) 90'	Stadium: Mestský futbalový štadión Attendance: 2,864

Saturday, 2 November 2019 14	Slovan Bratislava	2–0	Senica	Bratislava
17:00 CET (UTC+01:00)	Rabiu (yellow card) 31'; Bajrić 45+1'; Ratão 68'	Report	Didiba (yellow card) 35'	Stadium: Tehelné pole Attendance: 4,450

Sunday, 10 November 2019 15	Zlaté Moravce	0–1	Slovan Bratislava	Zlaté Moravce
15:00 CET (UTC+01:00)	Čögley (yellow card) 57'; Jacy (yellow card) 82'; Ďubek (yellow card) 90+3'	Report	Holman 71' de Kamps (yellow card) 90+2'	Stadium: Štadión FC ViOn; Attendance: 3,020

Saturday, 23 November 2019 16	Slovan Bratislava	2–0	Sereď	Bratislava
16:00 CET (UTC+01:00)	Holman (yellow card) 58'; Šporar 77', 82'; Ljubičić (yellow card) 79'	Report		Stadium: Tehelné pole Attendance: 4,371

Sunday, 1 December 2019 17	Žilina	0–0	Slovan Bratislava	Žilina
15:00 CET (UTC+01:00)		Report	Ljubičić (yellow card) 88'	Stadium: Štadión pod Dubňom; Attendance: 4,448

Saturday, 7 December 2019 18	Slovan Bratislava	2–0	DAC Dunajská Streda	Bratislava
15:30 CET (UTC+01:00)	Abena (yellow card) 15'; Rabiu 34'; Šporar 53'	Report	Davis (penalty missed) 16'; Blackman (yellow card) 32'; Jedlička (yellow card) 53'; K. Vida (yellow card) 55'	Stadium: Tehelné pole Attendance: 8,593

Sunday, 16 February 2020 19	Spartak Trnava	0–0	Slovan Bratislava	Trnava
15:00 CET (UTC+01:00)	Yao (yellow card) 22'; Mitrea (penalty missed) 48'; Grendel (yellow card) 60'	Report	de Kamps (yellow card) 35'; De Marco (yellow card) 90'	Stadium: Štadión Antona Malatinského; Attendance: 11,126

Saturday, 22 February 2020 20	Slovan Bratislava	2–0	Trenčín	Bratislava
14:00 CET (UTC+01:00)	De Marco 25'; Moha (yellow card) 45'; Ratão 73'	Report	Križan (yellow card) 20'; Kapuadi (yellow card) 90'	Stadium: Tehelné pole Attendance: 5,980

Sunday, 1 March 2020 21	Nitra	0–1	Slovan Bratislava	Nitra
15:30 CET (UTC+01:00)	Gatarić (yellow card) 61'	Report	Moha 56'	Stadium: Štadión pod Zoborom; Attendance: 2,670

Saturday, 7 March 2020 22	Slovan Bratislava	1–0	Ružomberok	Bratislava
15:30 CET (UTC+01:00)	Ratão 88', (yellow card) 89'	Report	Gerec (yellow card) 86'	Stadium: Tehelné pole Attendance: 5,040

Championship group

Saturday, 13 June 2020 23 / Championship group round 1	Slovan Bratislava	1–0	Ružomberok	Bratislava
18:00 CEST (UTC+02:00)	Medved 89'; Rabiu (yellow card) 90+5'	Report	Almási (yellow card) 90+4'	Stadium: Tehelné pole Attendance: 253

Saturday, 20 June 2020 24 / 2	Žilina	2–3	Slovan Bratislava	Žilina
18:00 CEST (UTC+02:00)	Myslovič 45+1'; Paur (yellow card) 55'; Fazlagić (yellow card) 86'; Kurminowski 90+1'	Report	Bajrić 5'; Ožbolt 32'; Moha 54'; Abena (yellow card) 55'; Weiss Jr. (yellow card) 73'	Stadium: Štadión pod Dubňom; Attendance: 285

Wednesday, 1 July 2020 25 / 3	DAC Dunajská Streda	1–3	Slovan Bratislava	Dunajská Streda
20:00 CEST (UTC+02:00)	Kalmár 17'; Blackman (yellow card) 45+4'; Ramírez (yellow card) 69'	Report	Medved 21'; Rabiu (yellow card) 52'; Moha 83', 90+4'	Stadium: MOL Aréna; Attendance: 6,120

Saturday, 4 July 2020 26 / 4	Slovan Bratislava	4–0	Zemplín Michalovce	Bratislava
18:00 CEST (UTC+02:00)	Nono 5'; Konstantinidis 43' (o.g.); Ratão 48', 61'	Report		Stadium: Tehelné pole Attendance: 3,561

Saturday, 11 July 2020 27 / 5	Slovan Bratislava	0–0	Spartak Trnava	Bratislava
18:00 CEST (UTC+02:00)		Report	Bamidele (yellow card) 23'; Yao (yellow card) 65'; Horvát (yellow card) 74'	Stadium: Tehelné pole Attendance: 6,253

== Slovak Cup ==
Wednesday, 9 October 2019 Second round	Liptovská Štiavnica (3)	0–4	Slovan Bratislava (1)	Liptovská Štiavnica
15:00 CEST (UTC+02:00)		Report	Dražić 5', 27', 65'; Nono 87'	Stadium: Štadión Liptovská Štiavnica; Attendance: 780

Saturday, 12 October 2019 Third round	Oravská Poruba (5)	0–7	Slovan Bratislava (1)	Oravská Poruba
14:00 CEST (UTC+02:00)		Report	Dražić 11', 52'; Moha 13', 27'; Nono 51'; Matoš 68'; Čavrić 81'	Stadium: Štadión Oravská Poruba; Attendance: 2,325

Saturday, 16 November 2019 Fourth round	Partizán Bardejov (2)	2–5	Slovan Bratislava (1)	Bardejov
13:00 CET (UTC+01:00)	Horodník 45', 58' (pen.); Rochev (yellow card) 62'	Report	Ratão 8'; Daniel 10', 30'; Ljubičić 20'; Dražić 46'; De Marco (yellow card) 72'	Stadium: Mestský futbalový štadión v Bardejove; Attendance: 3,064

Wednesday, 4 December 2019 Round of 16	Slovan Bratislava (1)	2–0	Žilina (1)	Bratislava
18:30 CET (UTC+01:00)	Kaša 25' (o.g.); Šporar (penalty missed) 29', 41'; Holman (yellow card) 45'; Nono (yellow card) 52'; De Marco (yellow card) 81'	Report	Anang (yellow card) 27'; Volešák (yellow card) 28'; Kiwior (yellow card) 40'; Králik (yellow card) 49'; Kaša (yellow card) 52'	Stadium: Tehelné pole Attendance: 3,879

Wednesday, 4 March 2020 Quarter-finals	Trenčín (1)	2–2 (5–6 p)	Slovan Bratislava (1)	Žilina
16:30 CET (UTC+01:00)	Ligeon 24'; Križan (yellow card) 48'; Kadák 62'; Kapuadi (yellow card) 71' van Kessel (yellow card) 81'; Šulek (yellow card) 86'	Report	Ratão 27', 66'; Nono (yellow card) 59'	Stadium: Štadión pod Dubňom; Attendance: 380
	Penalties
	Kadák (penalty scored); Depetris (penalty scored); El Mahdioui (penalty scored) van Kessel (penalty scored); Koolwijk (penalty missed); Šulek (penalty scored); Ligeon (penalty missed)		(penalty scored) de Kamps; (penalty scored) Ožbolt; (penalty scored) Ratão; (penalty scored) Lichý; (penalty missed) Henty; (penalty scored) De Marco; (penalty scored) Daniel

Tuesday, 16 June 2020 Semi-finals First leg	Slovan Bratislava (1)	4–1	Zlaté Moravce (1)	Bratislava
18:00 CEST (UTC+02:00)	Ožbolt 8', 28'; Medved 73'; Strelec 83'	Report	Cmiljanić 14'; Ďubek (yellow card) 85'; Brašeň (yellow card) 88'	Stadium: Tehelné pole Attendance: 252

Tuesday, 23 June 2020 Semi-finals Second leg	Zlaté Moravce (1)	0–2 (1–6 agg.)	Slovan Bratislava (1)	Zlaté Moravce
18:00 CEST (UTC+02:00)	Mészáros (yellow card) 14'; Asanović (yellow card) 55' (yellow-red card) 60'	Report	Henty (yellow card) 12'; Ratão (yellow card) 31'; Medved 45'; Weiss Jr. 61' (pen.); Apau (yellow card) 90+2'	Stadium: Štadión FC ViOn; Attendance: 332

Wednesday, 8 July 2020 Final	Slovan Bratislava (1)	1–0	Ružomberok (1)	Bratislava
18:00 CEST (UTC+02:00)	Ožbolt 48' (pen.) de Kamps (yellow card) 53'; Ratão (yellow card) 68'; Šulla (yellow card) 87'; Bajrić (yellow card) 90'	Report	Brenkus (yellow card) 48'; Regáli (yellow card) 90'	Stadium: Tehelné pole Attendance: 3,624

== UEFA Champions League ==
=== First qualifying round ===
Wednesday, 10 July 2019 First leg	Slovan Bratislava (Slovakia)	1–1	(Montenegro) Sutjeska Nikšić	Bratislava, Slovakia
20:15 CEST (UTC+02:00)	Ljubičić (yellow card) 41'; Šporar 82'	Report	Kojašević 90+5'	Stadium: Tehelné pole Attendance: 11,250

Wednesday, 17 July 2019 Second leg	Sutjeska Nikšić (Montenegro)	1–1 (a.e.t.) (2–2 agg.) (3–2 p)	(Slovakia) Slovan Bratislava	Nikšić, Montenegro
20:15 CEST (UTC+02:00)	Ciger (yellow card) 26'; Šofranac 90+3'; Janković (yellow card) 90+5'; Marković (yellow card) 90+5'; Kojašević (yellow card) 119'	Report	Nedić 49' (o.g.); Bajrić (yellow card) 53'; Ljubičić (yellow card) 67'; Medveděv (yellow card) 90+5'	Stadium: Stadion kraj Bistrice; Attendance: 4,764
	Penalties
	Nikolić (penalty scored); Kojašević (penalty missed); Vlaisavljević (penalty scored); Bubanja (penalty scored); Bulatović (penalty missed)		(penalty missed) Dražić; (penalty missed) Bozhikov; (penalty scored) Ratão; (penalty scored) Abena; (penalty missed) Šporar

== UEFA Europa League ==
=== Second qualifying round ===
Wednesday, 24 July 2019 First leg	Slovan Bratislava (Slovakia)	2–1	(Kosovo) Feronikeli	Bratislava, Slovakia
18:00 CEST (UTC+02:00)	Nono 9'; Holman (yellow card) 45'; Ljubičić (yellow card) 59'; Šporar 61' (pen.)	Report	Dabiqaj (yellow card) 55'; Hoti (yellow card) 62', (goal) 67'; Malaj (yellow card) 78'	Stadium: Tehelné pole Attendance: 7,150

Tuesday, 30 July 2019 Second leg	Feronikeli (Kosovo)	0–2 (1–4 agg.)	(Slovakia) Slovan Bratislava	Pristina, Kosovo
18:00 CEST (UTC+02:00)	Prekazi (yellow card) 30'; Hoti (yellow card) 33'; Islami (yellow card) 48'; Zeka (red card) 88'; Topalli (yellow card) 90'	Report	De Marco 19', (yellow card) 49'; Holman 54'; Bajrić (yellow card) 68'	Stadium: Fadil Vokrri Stadium; Attendance: 5,250

=== Third qualifying round ===
Wednesday, 7 August 2019 First leg	Slovan Bratislava (Slovakia)	1–0	(Republic of Ireland) Dundalk	Bratislava, Slovakia
20:15 CEST (UTC+02:00)	De Marco (yellow card) 44'; Šporar (yellow card) 65'; Holman 86'	Report	Cleary (yellow card) 90+2'	Stadium: Tehelné pole Attendance: 9,980

Tuesday, 13 August 2019 Second leg	Dundalk (Republic of Ireland)	1–3 (1–4 agg.)	(Slovakia) Slovan Bratislava	Dublin, Ireland
21:00 CEST (UTC+02:00)	McEleney (yellow card) 66'; Duffy 70'; Shields (yellow card) 71'; Hoban (penalty missed) 74'	Report	Ratão 12'; Čavrić 33'; Apau (yellow card) 73'; Ljubičić (yellow card) 75'; Daniel 90+3'	Stadium: Tallaght Stadium; Attendance: 4,199

=== Play-off round ===
Thursday, 22 August 2019 First leg	Slovan Bratislava (Slovakia)	1–0	(Greece) PAOK	Bratislava, Slovakia
21:00 CEST (UTC+02:00)	Medveděv (yellow card) 70'; Ljubičić (yellow card) 80'; Abena (yellow card) 80', (goal) 90+4'	Report	Matos (yellow card) 45'; Crespo (yellow card) 76'; Douglas (yellow card) 80'; Akpom (yellow card) 90+7'	Stadium: Tehelné pole Attendance: 20,233

Thursday, 29 August 2019 Second leg	PAOK (Greece)	3–2 (3–3 (a) agg.)	(Slovakia) Slovan Bratislava	Thessaloniki, Greece
19:00 CEST (UTC+02:00)	Limnios 49'; Świderski 50'; Varela (yellow card) 75'; Živković (yellow card) 87'; Giannoulis 87'	Report	De Marco (yellow card) 12', (goal) 62'; Medveděv 38', (yellow card) 75' de Kamps (yellow card) 52'; Greif (yellow card) 73'	Stadium: Toumba Stadium; Attendance: 20,776

=== Group stage ===
Pos	Team	Pld	W	D	L	GF	GA	GD	Pts	Qualification	BRA	WOL	SLO	BES
1	(Portugal) Braga	6	4	2	0	15	9	+6	14	Advance to knockout phase	—	3–3	2–2	3–1
2	(England) Wolverhampton Wanderers	6	4	1	1	11	5	+6	13	Advance to knockout phase	0–1	—	1–0	4–0
3	(Slovakia) Slovan Bratislava	6	1	1	4	10	13	−3	4		2–4	1–2	—	4–2
4	(Turkey) Beşiktaş	6	1	0	5	6	15	−9	3		1–2	0–1	2–1	—

Source: UEFA
Rules for classification: Group stage tiebreakers

==== Results by matchday ====
Round	1	2	3	4	5	6
Ground	H	A	H	A	A	H
Result	W	D	L	L	L	L
Position	1	1	3	3	3	3

A = Away; H = Home; W = Win; D = Draw; L = Loss

==== Matches ====
Thursday, 19 September 2019 1	Slovan Bratislava (Slovakia)	4–2	(Turkey) Beşiktaş	Bratislava, Slovakia
21:00 CEST (UTC+02:00)	Šporar 14', 58' de Kamps (yellow card) 28'; Ljubičić (yellow card) 84', (goal) 90+3'; Moha 90+4'	Report	Ruiz (yellow card) 8'; Ljajić 29' (pen.), (yellow card) 37'; Bozhikov 45+1' (o.g.)	Stadium: Tehelné pole Attendance: 5,273

Thursday, 3 October 2019 2	Braga (Portugal)	2–2	(Slovakia) Slovan Bratislava	Braga, Portugal
18:55 CEST (UTC+02:00)	Viana (yellow card) 7', (goal) 31'; Galeno 63'; Paulinho (yellow card) 86'	Report	de Kamps (yellow card) 44'; Šporar (penalty missed) 45+4', 45+4'; Sukhotskyi (yellow card) 49'; Moha (yellow card) 65'; Viana 87' (o.g.); Rabiu (yellow card) 89'	Stadium: Estadio Municipal; Attendance: 9,077

Thursday, 24 October 2019 3	Slovan Bratislava (Slovakia)	1–2	(England) Wolverhampton Wanderers	Bratislava, Slovakia
18:55 CEST (UTC+02:00)	Šporar 11'; Holman (yellow card) 45'; De Marco (yellow card) 63'; Rabiu (yellow card) 68'; Medveděv (yellow card) 86'	Report	Saïss 58'; Jiménez 63' (pen.), (yellow card) 90+2'; Jota (yellow card) 86' (yellow-red card) 87'	Stadium: Tehelné pole Attendance: 20,333

Thursday, 7 November 2019 4	Wolverhampton Wanderers (England)	1–0	(Slovakia) Slovan Bratislava	Wolverhampton, England
21:00 CET (UTC+01:00)	Neves (penalty missed) 51'; Jiménez (yellow card) 89', (goal) 90+2'	Report		Stadium: Molineux; Attendance: 29,789

Thursday, 28 November 2019 5	Beşiktaş (Turkey)	2–1	(Slovakia) Slovan Bratislava	Istanbul, Turkey
18:55 CET (UTC+01:00)	Uysal (yellow card) 53'; Erkin (yellow card) 63'; Gönül (yellow card) 74'; Roco 75'; Elneny (yellow card) 82'; Ljajić 90+2' (pen.), (yellow card) 90+4'	Report	De Kamps (yellow card) 30'; Daniel 35'; Holman (yellow card) 61'; Rabiu (yellow card) 78'; Abena (yellow card) 90+1'	Stadium: Vodafone Park; Attendance: 11,526

Thursday, 12 December 2019 6	Slovan Bratislava (Slovakia)	2–4	(Portugal) Braga	Bratislava, Slovakia
21:00 CET (UTC+01:00)	Šporar 42'; Moha 70'; Medveděv (yellow card) 82'	Report	Fonte 44'; Trincão 72'; Bozhikov 75' (o.g.); Paulinho 90+3'	Stadium: Tehelné pole Attendance: 10,856

== Statistics ==
=== Appearances ===
As of match played 11 July 2020

No.	Pos.	Nat.	Name	Fortuna liga		Slovak Cup		Champions League		Europa League		Total	
No.	Pos.	Nat.	Name	Apps	Starts	Apps	Starts	Apps	Starts	Apps	Starts	Apps	Starts
1	GK	(Slovakia)	Dominik Greif	20	20	0	0	2	2	12	12	34	34
2	DF	(Netherlands)	Mitch Apau	11	11	1	1	1	1	1	0	14	13
4	MF	(Slovakia)	Samuel Habodasz	0	0	1	0	0	0	0	0	1	0
4	FW	(Slovakia)	Adam Matoš	0	0	1	0	0	0	0	0	1	0
4	MF	(Bosnia and Herzegovina)	Alen Mustafić	2	2	2	1	0	0	0	0	4	3
6	MF	(Netherlands)	Joeri de Kamps	19	11	6	4	2	1	11	10	38	26
7	MF	(Morocco)	Moha	23	14	5	5	2	2	10	10	40	31
8	MF	(Croatia)	Marin Ljubičić	16	13	2	2	2	2	10	5	30	22
9	FW	(Nigeria)	Ezekiel Henty	5	4	2	1	0	0	0	0	7	5
9	FW	(Slovenia)	Andraž Šporar	11	9	1	1	2	2	12	12	26	24
10	MF	(Nigeria)	Ibrahim Rabiu	18	16	4	4	0	0	6	6	28	26
11	MF	(Serbia)	Dejan Dražić	16	12	4	4	2	1	6	3	28	20
12	FW	(Slovenia)	Alen Ožbolt	6	4	4	2	0	0	0	0	10	6
13	DF	(Slovakia)	Martin Majling	0	0	1	0	0	0	0	0	1	0
13	MF	(Slovakia)	Denis Potoma	0	0	2	1	0	0	0	0	2	1
14	DF	(Netherlands)	Myenty Abena	18	17	4	4	1	0	12	12	35	33
15	FW	(Slovakia)	David Strelec	12	8	3	1	0	0	2	0	17	9
16	DF	(Slovakia)	Samuel Kozlovský	0	0	2	1	0	0	0	0	2	1
16	MF	(Slovakia)	Daniel Filip Mašulovič	0	0	1	1	0	0	0	0	1	1
17	DF	(Czech Republic)	Jurij Medveděv	11	8	5	5	1	1	10	10	27	24
20	MF	(Czech Republic)	Erik Daniel	24	17	5	3	2	1	11	4	42	25
21	FW	(Brazil)	Rafael Ratão	20	14	6	4	2	1	10	4	38	23
23	MF	(Slovakia)	Samuel Lavrinčík	0	0	1	0	0	0	0	0	1	0
23	DF	(Ukraine)	Artem Sukhotskyi	12	12	3	3	2	2	5	2	22	19
24	MF	(Spain)	Nono	21	16	7	6	0	0	5	2	33	24
25	DF	(Slovakia)	Lukáš Pauschek	9	7	3	3	0	0	0	0	12	10
26	DF	(Hungary)	Richárd Guzmics	4	2	1	1	0	0	0	0	5	3
26	MF	(Slovakia)	Filip Lichý	3	2	1	0	0	0	0	0	4	2
27	MF	(Hungary)	Dávid Holman	18	11	3	3	2	1	10	10	33	25
28	DF	(Slovakia)	Daniel Borovský	0	0	1	1	0	0	0	0	1	1
28	MF	(Slovakia)	Adam Jackuliak	0	0	1	0	0	0	0	0	1	0
29	DF	(Bulgaria)	Vasil Bozhikov	17	17	3	3	2	2	11	11	33	33
30	GK	(Slovakia)	Michal Šulla	6	6	8	8	0	0	0	0	14	14
31	GK	(Slovakia)	Martin Trnovský	1	1	0	0	0	0	0	0	1	1
36	DF	(Brazil)	Lucas Lovat	5	5	0	0	0	0	0	0	5	5
55	FW	(Slovenia)	Žan Medved	5	2	3	2	0	0	0	0	8	4
66	DF	(Slovenia)	Kenan Bajrić	17	17	5	5	2	2	8	6	32	30
77	MF	(Serbia)	Aleksandar Čavrić	7	5	2	0	2	1	4	2	15	8
79	MF	(Slovakia)	Vladimír Weiss Jr.	3	1	3	1	0	0	0	0	6	2
81	DF	(Argentina)	Vernon De Marco	17	13	8	7	0	0	11	11	36	31
99	FW	(Greece)	Georgios Tzovaras	0	0	1	0	0	0	0	0	1	0

=== Goalscorers ===
As of match played 11 July 2020

No.	Pos.	Nat.	Name	Fortuna liga	Slovak Cup	Champions League	Europa League	Total
4	FW	(Slovakia)	Adam Matoš	0	1	0	0	1
7	MF	(Morocco)	Moha	6	2	0	2	10
8	MF	(Croatia)	Marin Ljubičić	0	1	0	1	2
9	FW	(Slovenia)	Andraž Šporar	12	1	1	6	20
10	MF	(Nigeria)	Ibrahim Rabiu	1	0	0	0	1
11	MF	(Serbia)	Dejan Dražić	1	6	0	0	7
12	FW	(Slovenia)	Alen Ožbolt	1	3	0	0	4
14	DF	(Netherlands)	Myenty Abena	2	0	0	1	3
15	FW	(Slovakia)	David Strelec	4	1	0	0	5
17	DF	(Czech Republic)	Jurij Medveděv	0	0	0	1	1
20	MF	(Czech Republic)	Erik Daniel	1	2	0	2	5
21	FW	(Brazil)	Rafael Ratão	9	3	0	1	13
23	DF	(Ukraine)	Artem Sukhotskyi	2	0	0	0	2
24	MF	(Spain)	Nono	4	2	0	1	7
27	MF	(Hungary)	Dávid Holman	5	0	0	2	7
55	FW	(Slovenia)	Žan Medved	2	2	0	0	4
66	DF	(Slovenia)	Kenan Bajrić	3	0	0	0	3
77	MF	(Serbia)	Aleksandar Čavrić	2	1	0	1	4
79	MF	(Slovakia)	Vladimír Weiss Jr.	0	1	0	0	1
81	DF	(Argentina)	Vernon De Marco	1	0	0	2	3
Own goals				1	1	1	1	4
Total				57	27	2	21	107

=== Clean sheets ===
As of match played 11 July 2020

No.	Nat.	Name	Fortuna liga	Slovak Cup	Champions League	Europa League	Total
1	(Slovakia)	Dominik Greif	13	0	0	3	16
30	(Slovakia)	Michal Šulla	5	5	0	0	10
31	(Slovakia)	Martin Trnovský	1	0	0	0	1
Total			19	5	0	3	27

=== Disciplinary record ===
As of match played 11 July 2020

No.	Pos.	Nat.	Name	Fortuna liga			Slovak Cup			Champions League			Europa League			Total		
No.	Pos.	Nat.	Name	Yellow card	(yellow card) (yellow-red card)	Red card	Yellow card	(yellow card) (yellow-red card)	Red card	Yellow card	(yellow card) (yellow-red card)	Red card	Yellow card	(yellow card) (yellow-red card)	Red card	Yellow card	(yellow card) (yellow-red card)	Red card
1	GK	(Slovakia)	Dominik Greif	0	0	0	0	0	0	0	0	0	1	0	0	1	0	0
2	DF	(Netherlands)	Mitch Apau	2	0	0	1	0	0	0	0	0	1	0	0	4	0	0
6	MF	(Netherlands)	Joeri de Kamps	4	0	1	1	0	0	0	0	0	4	0	0	9	0	1
7	MF	(Morocco)	Moha	1	0	0	0	0	0	0	0	0	1	0	0	2	0	0
8	MF	(Croatia)	Marin Ljubičić	4	0	0	0	0	0	2	0	0	4	0	0	10	0	0
9	FW	(Nigeria)	Ezekiel Henty	0	0	0	1	0	0	0	0	0	0	0	0	1	0	0
9	FW	(Slovenia)	Andraž Šporar	1	0	0	0	0	0	0	0	0	1	0	0	2	0	0
10	MF	(Nigeria)	Ibrahim Rabiu	5	0	0	0	0	0	0	0	0	3	0	0	8	0	0
11	MF	(Serbia)	Dejan Dražić	1	0	0	0	0	0	0	0	0	0	0	0	1	0	0
14	DF	(Netherlands)	Myenty Abena	4	0	0	0	0	0	0	0	0	2	0	0	6	0	0
17	DF	(Czech Republic)	Jurij Medveděv	1	0	0	0	0	0	1	0	0	4	0	0	6	0	0
20	MF	(Czech Republic)	Erik Daniel	1	0	0	0	0	0	0	0	0	0	0	0	1	0	0
21	FW	(Brazil)	Rafael Ratão	1	0	0	2	0	0	0	0	0	0	0	0	3	0	0
23	DF	(Ukraine)	Artem Sukhotskyi	1	0	0	0	0	0	0	0	0	1	0	0	2	0	0
24	MF	(Spain)	Nono	1	0	0	2	0	0	0	0	0	0	0	0	3	0	0
27	MF	(Hungary)	Dávid Holman	2	0	0	1	0	0	0	0	0	3	0	0	6	0	0
30	GK	(Slovakia)	Michal Šulla	1	0	0	1	0	0	0	0	0	0	0	0	2	0	0
66	DF	(Slovenia)	Kenan Bajrić	0	0	0	1	0	0	1	0	0	1	0	0	3	0	0
79	MF	(Slovakia)	Vladimír Weiss Jr.	1	0	0	0	0	0	0	0	0	0	0	0	1	0	0
81	DF	(Argentina)	Vernon De Marco	2	0	0	2	0	0	0	0	0	4	0	0	8	0	0
Total				33	0	1	12	0	0	4	0	0	30	0	0	79	0	1

=== Attendances ===
As of match played 11 July 2020

	Matches	Attendances	Average	High	Low
Fortuna liga	12	76,510	6,376	14,933	3,561
Slovak Cup	1	3,879	3,879	3,879	3,879
Champions League	1	11,250	11,250	11,250	11,250
Europa League	4	48,219	12,055	20,233	7,150
Total (Note: The matches against Beşiktaş (September 2019), Nitra (September 2019) and Wolverhampton Wanderers (October 2019), which were officially played behind closed doors, are not included in this statistics.) (Note: Two home matches played in June 2020 are not included because of hygienic measures due to the COVID-19 pandemic which limited the number of spectators to 500.)	18	139,858	7,770	20,233	3,561

== Awards ==
=== Fortuna liga Player of the Month ===
Month	Player	Ref
September	(Slovakia) David Strelec	
November/December	(Slovenia) Andraž Šporar	
February/March	(Slovakia) Dominik Greif	

=== Fortuna liga Goal of the Month ===
Month	Player	Ref
October	(Slovenia) Andraž Šporar	

=== Fortuna liga Team of the Season ===
Position	Player	Ref
GK	(Slovakia) Dominik Greif	
DF	(Czech Republic) Jurij Medveděv	
DF	(Netherlands) Myenty Abena	
DF	(Bulgaria) Vasil Bozhikov	
MF	(Hungary) Dávid Holman	
MF	(Morocco) Moha	
FW	(Slovenia) Andraž Šporar	

=== Fortuna liga Player of the Season ===
Season	Player	Ref
2019–20	(Slovakia) Dominik Greif	

=== Fortuna liga Manager of the Season ===
Season	Manager	Ref
2019–20	(Slovakia) Ján Kozák Jr.	

=== Fortuna liga Top Scorer of the Season ===
Season	Player	Goals	Ref
2019–20	(Slovenia) Andraž Šporar	12	
