= 2020 Slovak Cup final =

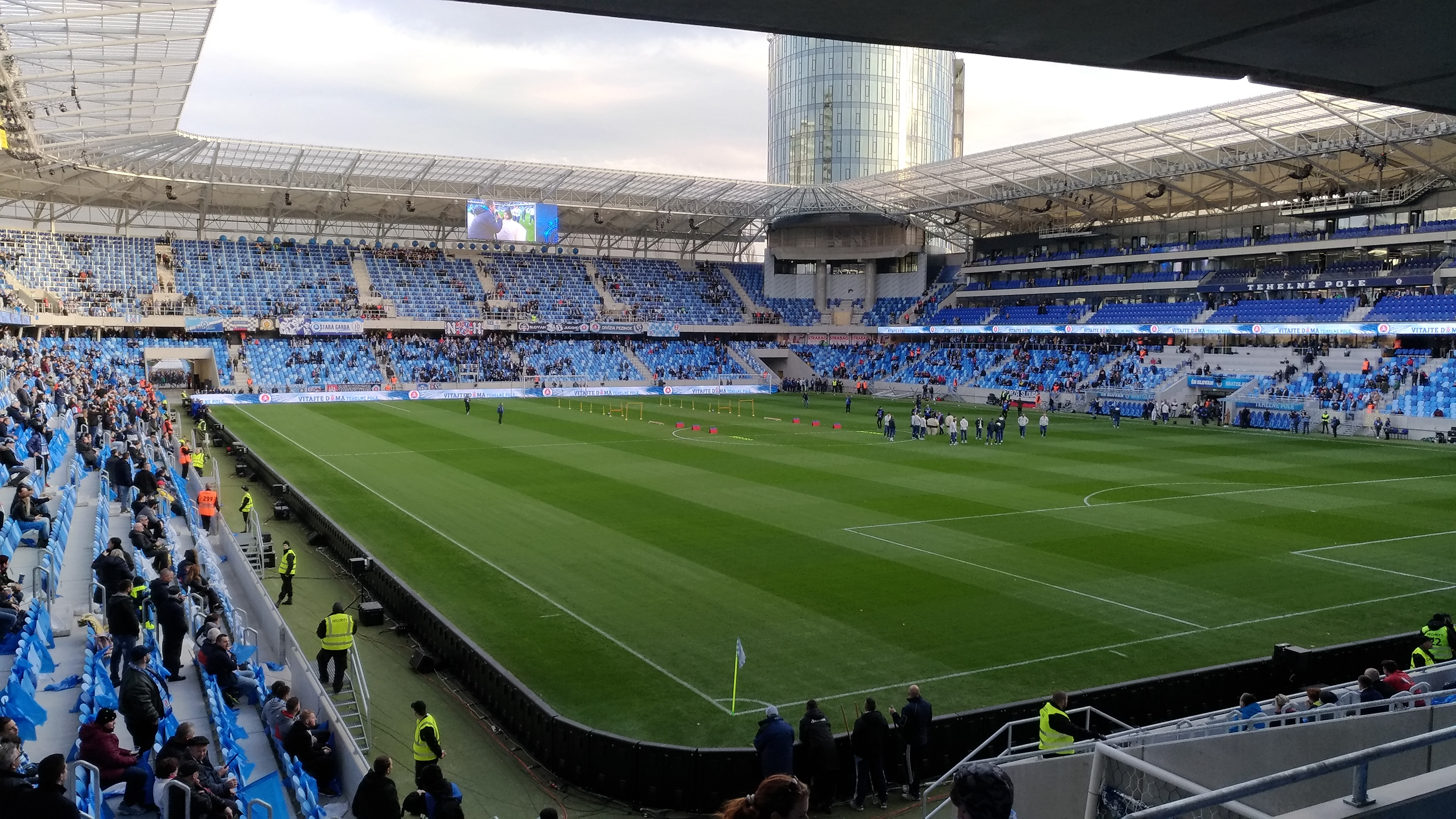
- Tehelné pole in Bratislava held the final
- Event: 2019–20 Slovak Cup
Slovan Bratislava	Ružomberok
1	0
- Date: 8 July 2020
- Venue: Tehelné pole, Bratislava
- Referee: Filip Glova
- Attendance: 3,624

The 2020 Slovak Cup final (known as the Slovnaft Cup for sponsorship reasons) was the final match of the 2019–20 Slovak Cup, the 51st season of the top cup competition in Slovak football. The match was played at the Tehelné pole in Bratislava, on 8 July 2020, contested by ŠK Slovan Bratislava and MFK Ružomberok.

== Teams ==
In the following table, finals until 1993 were in the Czechoslovak era, since 1994 were in the Slovak era.

Team	Previous final appearances (bold indicates winners)
Slovan Bratislava	20 (**1970**, 1971, **1972**, **1974**, **1976**, 1978, **1982**, **1983**, **1989**, **1994**, **1997**, **1999**, 2003, **2010**, **2011**, **2013**, 2014, 2016, **2017**, **2018**)
Ružomberok	3 (2001, **2006**, 2018)

== Road to the final ==
Note: In all results below, the score of the finalist is given first (H: home; A: away).

Slovan Bratislava (1)		Round	Ružomberok (1)
Opponent	Result	2019–20 Slovak Cup	Opponent	Result
Liptovská Štiavnica (3)	4–0 (A)	Second Round	Švošov (5)	6–0 (A)
Oravská Poruba (5)	7–0 (A)	Third Round	Martin (3)	2–0 (A)
Partizán Bardejov (2)	5–2 (A)	Fourth Round	Kalša (3)	6–2 (A)
Žilina (1)	2–0 (H)	Round of 16	Senica (1)	1–1 (4–3 p) (A)
Trenčín (1)	2–2 (6–5 p) (A)	Quarter-finals	Sereď (1)	2–0 (A)
Zlaté Moravce (1)	4–1 (H), 2–0 (A) (6–1 agg.)	Semi-finals	DAC Dunajská Streda (1)	1–1 (A), 3–0 (H) (4–1 agg.)

== Match ==
=== Details ===
8 July 2020
18:00 (UTC+2)

Slovan Bratislava	1–0	Ružomberok
Ožbolt 48' (pen.)	Report

Tehelné pole, Bratislava
Attendance: 3,624
Referee: Filip Glova

**Slovan Bratislava**	**Ružomberok**

GK	30	(Slovakia) Michal Šulla	(yellow card) 87'
CB	14	(Netherlands) Myenty Abena		(substituted off) 46'
CB	66	(Slovenia) Kenan Bajrić	(yellow card) 90'
CB	29	(Bulgaria) Vasil Bozhikov (c)
RM	17	(Czech Republic) Jurij Medveděv		(substituted off) 84'
CM	6	(Netherlands) Joeri de Kamps	(yellow card) 53'
CM	10	(Nigeria) Rabiu Ibrahim
LM	7	(Morocco) Moha		(substituted off) 83'
AM	15	(Slovakia) David Strelec		(substituted off) 64'
CF	55	(Slovenia) Žan Medved
CF	12	(Slovenia) Alen Ožbolt		(substituted off) 74'
Substitutes:
DF	81	(Argentina) Vernon De Marco		(substituted in) 46'
FW	21	(Brazil) Rafael Ratão	(yellow card) 68'	(substituted in) 64'
MF	24	(Spain) Nono		(substituted in) 74'
MF	79	(Slovakia) Vladimír Weiss		(substituted in) 83'
MF	20	(Czech Republic) Erik Daniel		(substituted in) 84'
Manager:
(Slovakia) Ján Kozák

GK	33	(Slovakia) Matúš Macík
CB	19	(Slovakia) Matej Čurma
CB	3	(Slovakia) Ján Maslo
CB	10	(Czech Republic) Filip Twardzik
RM	30	(Slovakia) Lukáš Kojnok		(substituted off) 72'
CM	26	(Slovakia) Timotej Múdry
CM	28	(Slovakia) Dávid Filinský
LM	2	(Slovakia) Alexander Mojžiš		(substituted off) 72'
AM	29	(Slovakia) Adam Brenkus		(substituted off) 61'
CF	15	(Slovakia) Štefan Gerec		(substituted off) 82'
CF	9	(Slovakia) Martin Regáli	(yellow card) 90'
Substitutes:
DF	13	(Slovakia) Matej Madleňák		(substituted in) 61'
MF	8	(Slovakia) Dalibor Takáč		(substituted in) 72'
MF	32	(Slovakia) Peter Ďungel		(substituted in) 72'
MF	4	(Slovakia) Matúš Kmeť		(substituted in) 82'
Manager:
(Slovakia) Ján Haspra

Assistant referees:
Peter Bednár
Dušan Hrčka
Fourth official:
Pavol Chmura

**Match rules**

- 90 minutes.
- 30 minutes of extra time if necessary.
- Penalty shoot-out if scores still level.

== See also ==
- 2019–20 Slovak Cup
- 2020–21 UEFA Europa League
