= Petar Orlandić =

Montenegrin footballer

Petar Orlandić Петар Орландић
Personal information
- Full name: Petar Orlandić
- Date of birth: 6 August 1990 (age 36)
- Place of birth: Titograd, Montenegro, Yugoslavia
- Height: 1.93 m (6 ft 4 in)
- Position: Forward

Team information
- Current team: Jezero
- Number: 90

Youth career
- Ribnica

Senior career*
Years	Team	Apps	(Gls)
2009–2014	Zeta	82	(33)
2014	→ Hapoel Tel Aviv (loan)	6	(1)
2015–2017	Red Star Belgrade	30	(14)
2017	União	5	(2)
2018	Tianshan Leopard	5	(0)
2018	Birkirkara	5	(2)
2019	Sukhothai	10	(3)
2020	Spartak Trnava	4	(1)
2021	Zeta	10	(1)
2022–2023	Zvijezda 09	13	(8)
2023	Otrant-Olympic	4	(0)
2023–2024	Podgorica	4	(2)
2024–	Jezero	10	(2)
- * Club domestic league appearances and goals as of 29 May 2024

Petar Orlandić (Serbian Cyrillic: Петар Орландић, pronounced [pětar ǒrlanditɕ, pê-]; born 6 August 1990) is a Montenegrin footballer who plays for Jezero as a forward.

== Club career ==
=== Zeta ===
Orlandić first began playing football with FK Ribnica before he was recruited by first-tier club Zeta. He made his debut in the Montenegrin top flight with Zeta in 2009, where for a period of time became the top scorer for the club and the league in the 2013–2014, during which he scored 12 goals in 16 matches. On October 31, 2014, Orlandić scored a hat-trick against Berane.

==== Loan to Hapoel Tel Aviv ====
On February 5, 2014, Orlandić went on a 6-month loan to Hapoel Tel Aviv, with an option for Hapoel to buy out his contract after the 6 months expired. However, he saw minimal playing time with Hapoel, and his nine appearances for the team accumulated only about 90 minutes of playing time. Orlandić scored a total of two league goals for Hapoel.

=== Red Star Belgrade ===
On February 6, 2015, he signed a 3-year contract with Serbian club Red Star Belgrade. After Orlandić scored a goal against FK Rad on May 3, 2015, Serbian sports portal "Mozzart Sport" commented that Orlandić and Luka Jović were becoming a formidable striker tandem.

=== Spartak Trnava ===
Orlandić had joined Spartak Trnava in January 2017. He made his debut in Slovakia on 16 February 2020 in a grand derby match against reigning champions and table leaders Slovan Bratislava. The home fixture at Anton Malatinský Stadium had concluded in a goal-less tie and Orlandić completed the entire match.

In another home fixture against ViOn Zlaté Moravce, on 1 March 2020, he scored his first goal for Spartak by equalising a game in the 76th minute, scoring by a header after a cross by Yann Michael Yao. While ViOn took the lead in the first-half through Tomáš Ďubek, Trnava took the victory after a stoppage-time goal by Alex Sobczyk. Orlandić also conceded a yellow card in the second half.

In the following game against DAC Dunajská Streda, Orlandić suffered a seriously looking open head injury. While he was supposed to leave the pitch, he refused and collapsed after the final blow.

Fortuna Liga was then postponed due to coronavirus pandemic. As Spartak resumed training process, it was announced, on 5 May 2020, that Orlandić was removed from the first squad due to disciplinary issues, which effectively meant he became club-less, as the B-squad's season was annulled due to the pandemic.

=== Zvijezda 09 ===
After a spell at FK Zeta in 2021, Orlandić was club-less for several months, before he in March 2022 signed with Bosnian First League of the Republika Srpska club Zvijezda 09.

== Honours ==
=== Club ===
Red Star Belgrade

- Serbian SuperLiga (1): 2015–16
