= Dominik Greif =

Slovak footballer

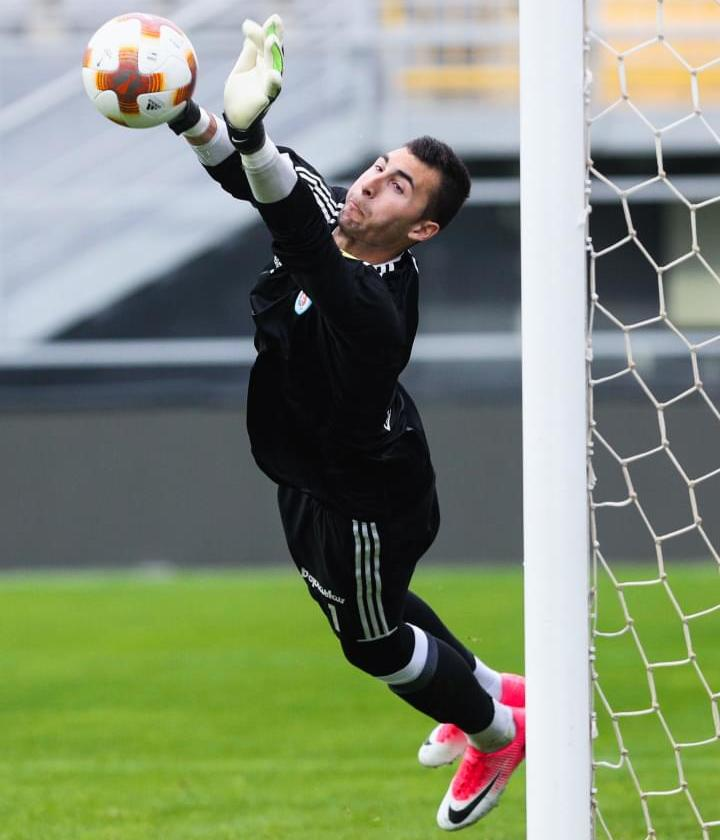
- Greif with Slovan Bratislava in 2018

Personal information
- Date of birth: 6 April 1997 (age 29)
- Place of birth: Bratislava, Slovakia
- Height: 1.97 m (6 ft 6 in)
- Position: Goalkeeper

Team information
- Current team: Lyon
- Number: 1

Youth career
- ŠK Vrakuňa Bratislava
- 2008–2015: Slovan Bratislava

Senior career*
Years	Team	Apps	(Gls)
2015–2021	Slovan Bratislava	103	(0)
2021–2025	Mallorca	34	(0)
2025–	Lyon	34	(0)

International career^{‡}
2015–2016	Slovakia U19	4	(1)
2018	Slovakia U21	1	(0)
2019–	Slovakia	9	(0)
- * Club domestic league appearances and goals as of 9 October 2026 ‡ National team caps and goals as of 15 November 2026

Dominik Greif (born 6 April 1997) is a Slovak professional footballer who plays as a goalkeeper for Ligue 1 club Lyon and the Slovakia national team.

== Club career ==
=== Slovan Bratislava ===
Greif made his professional debut for Slovan Bratislava against MFK Zemplín Michalovce on 13 May 2016. During the 2018–19 season, Greif was the first-choice goalkeeper over Michal Šulla, playing in 29 of the 32 games during the season.

=== Mallorca ===
On 6 July 2021, Greif joined newly-promoted La Liga club Mallorca on a five-year contract. Shortly after his arrival, he was plagued by various health problems: a muscle injury first sidelined him for a month, he then had to fight an infection of his wisdom teeth and he was sidelined by major chronic pain caused by an unspecified illness not related to football. He could not practice for almost a year until doctors finally found the cause and provided appropriate treatment. Greif eventually came back to play in a competitive game in December 2022.

During the 2023–24 Copa del Rey, Greif dropped out of a training camp in Valle de Egüés due to a gastric illness. He returned in the semi-final against Real Sociedad on 27 February 2024, saving a penalty from Brais Méndez in the first half and from Mikel Oyarzabal at the start of the subsequent shootout, which Mallorca won 5–4 to reach the final.

=== Lyon ===
On 18 August 2025, Ligue 1 club Lyon announced the signing of Greif until 2029, for a reported initial fee of €4M, with a potential €1.25M in add-ons and a 15% sell-on clause.

== International career ==
Although Greif was noted as a back-up goalkeeper in the Slovak senior team, he was first called up to the national team on 25 May 2019 by Pavel Hapal. The nomination was for a double fixture in June – a home friendly match against Jordan, to which, unusually, 29 players were called-up and a UEFA Euro 2020 qualifying fixture against Azerbaijan, played away on 11 June 2019. The squad was reduced to 23 players for the latter fixture.

Greif made his debut for the Slovak senior squad against Jordan on 7 June 2019 at the Anton Malatinský Stadium in Trnava. He came on at the start of the second half as a replacement for Matúš Kozáčik, with Slovakia trailing 1–0 and didn't concede any further goals as Slovakia completed a 5–1 win.

By the end of 2019, Greif also played in another friendly match against Paraguay, known as a farewell match for former captains Martin Škrtel, Tomáš Hubočan, and Adam Nemec.

== Career statistics ==
=== Club ===
As of match played 15 October 2026

Appearances and goals by club, season and competition
Club	Season	League			National cup (Note: Includes Slovak Cup, Copa del Rey)		Europe		Other		Total	
Club	Season	Division	Apps	Goals	Apps	Goals	Apps	Goals	Apps	Goals	Apps	Goals
Slovan Bratislava	2015–16	Fortuna liga	2	0	2	0	0	0	—		4	0
Slovan Bratislava	2016–17	Fortuna liga	8	0	1	0	0	0	1 (Note: Appearance in Czech-Slovak Supercup)	0	10	0
Slovan Bratislava	2017–18	Fortuna liga	19	0	2	0	4 (Note: Appearance(s) in UEFA Europa League)	0	—		25	0
Slovan Bratislava	2018–19	Fortuna liga	28	0	0	0	2	0	—		30	0
Slovan Bratislava	2019–20	Fortuna liga	20	0	0	0	14 (Note: Two appearances in UEFA Champions League, twelve appearances in UEFA Europa League)	0	—		32	0
Slovan Bratislava	2020–21	Fortuna liga	26	0	0	0	1	0	—		27	0
Slovan Bratislava	Total		103	0	5	0	19	0	1	0	128	0
Mallorca	2021–22	La Liga	1	0	1	0	—		—		2	0
Mallorca	2022–23	La Liga	1	0	3	0	—		—		4	0
Mallorca	2023–24	La Liga	1	0	7	0	—		—		8	0
Mallorca	2024–25	La Liga	31	0	0	0	—		1 (Note: Appearance in Supercopa de España)	0	32	0
Mallorca	Total		34	0	11	0	—		1	0	46	0
Lyon	2025–26	Ligue 1	29	0	0	0	6	0	—		35	0
Lyon	2026–27	Ligue 1	5	0	0	0	5 (Note: Four appearances in UEFA Champions League, one appearance in UEFA Europa League)	0	—		10	0
Lyon	Total		34	0	0	0	11	0	—		45	0
Career total			154	0	16	0	30	0	2	0	202	0

=== International ===
As of match played 13 November 2026

Appearances and goals by national team and year
National team	Year	Apps	Goals
Slovakia	2019	2	0
Slovakia	2020	2	0
Slovakia	2024	1	0
Slovakia	2025	0	0
Slovakia	2026	4	0
Total		9	0

== Honours ==
Slovan Bratislava

- Slovak First League: 2018–19, 2019–20, 2020–21
- Slovak Cup: 2016–17, 2017–18, 2019–20, 2020–21

Mallorca

- Copa del Rey runner-up: 2023-24

Individual

- Slovak First League Player of the Month: February/March 2020
- Slovak First League Best Goalkeeper: 2019–20, 2020–21
- Slovak First League Team of the Season: 2019–20, 2020–21
