= Luis Ramirez =

Luis Ramirez or Luis Ramírez may refer to:

== Sports ==
- Luis Ramírez de Lucena (c. 1465-c. 1530), Spanish chess player
- Luis Ramírez (gymnast) (born 1948), Cuban Olympic gymnast
- Luis Ramírez Zapata (born 1954), former Salvodoran footballer
- Luis Ramírez (footballer, born 1984), Peruvian football midfielder
- Luis Ramírez (footballer, born 1977), Honduran football striker
- Luís Ramírez (footballer, born 1997), Venezuelan football midfielder

== Others ==
- Luis L. Ramirez (1963-2005), convicted murderer, executed in Texas in 2005
- Luis Alberto Ramírez, bass guitarist for Colombian heavy metal band Kraken

== See also ==
- José Luis Ramírez (born 1958), Mexican boxer
- José Luis Ramírez (racing driver) (born 1979), Mexican NASCAR driver
