= Georgios Tzovaras =

Greek footballer

Giorgos Tzovaras
Personal information
- Full name: Georgios Tzovaras
- Date of birth: 3 November 1999 (age 26)
- Place of birth: Volos, Greece
- Height: 1.86 m (6 ft 1 in)
- Position: Winger

Team information
- Current team: Atromitos
- Number: 99

Youth career
- 2015–2019: PAOK

Senior career*
Years	Team	Apps	(Gls)
2019–2020	Slovan Bratislava B	6	(2)
2020–2021	Apollon Larissa	8	(0)
2021–2022	Niki Volos	21	(3)
2022–	Atromitos	75	(9)

International career^{‡}
2015–2016	Greece U17	9	(2)
2017	Greece U18	6	(2)
2017–2018	Greece U19	12	(2)
2018	Greece U20	2	(0)
- * Club domestic league appearances and goals as of 6 September 2026 ‡ National team caps and goals as of 1 November 2019

Georgios Tzovaras (Greek: Γεώργιος Τζοβάρας; born 3 November 1999) is a Greek professional footballer who plays as a winger for Super League club Atromitos.

== Honours ==
Slovan Bratislava

- Slovnaft Cup: 2019–20
