= Jurij Medveděv =

Czech footballer (born 1996)

Personal information
- Date of birth: 18 June 1996 (age 30)
- Place of birth: Badamsha, Kazakhstan
- Height: 1.80 m (5 ft 11 in)
- Position: Right back

Team information
- Current team: Slovan Bratislava
- Number: 17

Youth career
- TJ Sušice
- Viktoria Plzeň

Senior career*
Years	Team	Apps	(Gls)
2015–2017	Viktoria Plzeň	0	(0)
2015–2017	→ Baník Sokolov (loan)	36	(0)
2017	→ Senica (loan)	17	(3)
2018–2023	Slovan Bratislava	68	(1)
2018	→ Senica (loan)	4	(0)
2023–2024	Sochi	12	(1)
2024–	Slovan Bratislava	16	(0)
2025–	Slovan Bratislava B	5	(1)
2026	→ Tatran Prešov (loan)	9	(1)

International career^{‡}
2013–2014	Czech Republic U18	8	(1)
2014–2015	Czech Republic U19	6	(0)
- * Club domestic league appearances and goals as of 15 August 2026 ‡ National team caps and goals as of 2 February 2019

Jurij Medveděv (Kazakh: Юрий Медведев; born 18 June 1996) is a professional footballer who plays for Slovak club Tatran Prešov on loan from Slovan Bratislava as a right back. Born in Kazakhstan, he has represented the Czech Republic at youth level.

== Club career ==
=== FK Senica ===
Medveděv made his Fortuna Liga debut for Senica against AS Trenčín on 23 July 2017.

=== Sochi ===
On 20 June 2023, Medveděv signed with the Russian club Sochi. His aunt and cousin live in the city. Following the relegation of Sochi into Russian First League, Medveděv departed from Sochi.

=== Return to Slovan ===
On 13 June 2024, Medveděv returned to Slovan Bratislava on a three-year contract. Medveděv describe his return to Slovan as a "return home", with General Manager Ivan Kmotrík Jr. adding that the player had "shown interest" in returning to Bratislava, Slovan signed him to increase options and increase competition on the side-back position. It was, however, also noted, that his departure to Russia, following the Russian invasion of Ukraine, had angered some fans and even lead to an end in cooperation with his previous agents.

== Private life ==
Medveděv was born in Badamsha, Kazakhstan to ethnic Russian parents. When he was 3 year old, he moved with his family to the Czech Republic. He has a son, who was born during his first stay with Slovan Bratislava.

== Career statistics ==
As of match played 15 August 2026

Appearances and goals by club, season and competition
Club	Season	League			National cup		Continental		Other		Total	
Club	Season	Division	Apps	Goals	Apps	Goals	Apps	Goals	Apps	Goals	Apps	Goals
Viktoria Plzeň	2014–15	Czech First League	0	0	2	0	—		—		2	0
Baník Sokolov	2015–16	Czech National Football League	13	0	0	0	—		—		13	0
Baník Sokolov	2016–17	Czech National Football League	23	0	2	0	—		—		25	0
Baník Sokolov	Total		36	0	2	0	—		—		28	0
Senica	2017–18	Slovak First Football League	21	3	1	0	—		—		22	3
Slovan Bratislava	2018–19	Slovak First Football League	10	0	0	0	0	0	0	0	10	0
Slovan Bratislava	2019–20	Slovak First Football League	11	0	5	0	11 (Note: Ten appearances and one goal in UEFA Europa League, one appearance in UEFA Champions League)	1	0	0	27	1
Slovan Bratislava	2020–21	Slovak First Football League	16	0	6	0	0	0	0	0	22	0
Slovan Bratislava	2021–22	Slovak First Football League	11	0	4	1	9 (Note: Five appearances in UEFA Europa Conference League, four appearance in UEFA Champions League)	0	0	0	24	0
Slovan Bratislava	2022–23	Slovak First Football League	20	0	5	0	15 (Note: Nine appearances and one goal in UEFA Europa Conference League, four appearance in UEFA Champions League, two appearances in UEFA Europa League)	1	0	0	40	0
Slovan Bratislava	Total		68	0	20	0	35	2	0	0	126	2
Sochi	2023–24	Russian Premier League	12	1	4	0	—		—		16	1
Slovan Bratislava	2024–25	Slovak First Football League	12	0	1	0	5 (Note: Appearances in UEFA Champions League)	0	0	0	18	0
Slovan Bratislava	2025–26	Slovak First Football League	0	0	2	0	0	0	—		2	0
Slovan Bratislava	2026–27	Slovak First Football League	2	0	0	0	1	0	—		3	0
Slovan Bratislava	Total		14	0	3	0	6	0	0	0	23	0
Tatran Prešov (loan)	2025–26	Slovak First Football League	9	0	3	0	—		—		12	0
Career total			160	4	35	0	41	2	0	0	236	6

== Honours ==
Slovan Bratislava

- Fortuna Liga (4): 2018–19, 2019–20, 2020–21, 2021–22
- Slovnaft Cup (2): 2019–20, 2020–21

Individual

- Slovak Super Liga Team of the Season: 2019-20, 2022–23
