= 2019–20 Slovak First Football League =

Fortuna liga
- Season: 2019–20
- Dates: 20 July 2019 – 11 July 2020
- Champions: Slovan Bratislava
- Champions League: Slovan Bratislava
- Europa League: Žilina; Dunajská Streda; MFK Ružomberok
- Matches: 156
- Goals: 398 (2.55 per match)
- Top goalscorer: Andraž Šporar (12)
- Biggest home win: Trenčín 8–1 Michalovce (15 February 2020)
- Biggest away win: Sereď 0–4 Slovan (18 August 2019); Pohronie 0–4 Trenčín (24 August 2019)
- Highest scoring: Trenčín 8–1 Michalovce (15 February 2020)
- Highest attendance: 14,933 (Slovan-Trnava)
- Lowest attendance: 147 (Trenčín-Sereď)
- Average attendance: ▲2,493
- All statistics correct as of 11 July 2020.

The 2019–20 Slovak First Football League (known as the Slovak Fortuna liga for sponsorship reasons) was the 27th season of first-tier football league in Slovakia since its establishment in 1993.

Slovan Bratislava were the defending champions and successfully defended their title, winning their record-extending 10th Slovak title.

== Effects of the COVID-19 pandemic ==
Since March, the season was affected by the COVID-19 pandemic. On 7 March, the 22nd and last round of the regular stage took place. Both the championship group and the relegation group were subsequently supposed to have 10 rounds starting on 14 March. However, the season was interrupted until the end of May. On 22 May, the league committee approved the restart of the competition with a new 5-round model starting on 13 June. The committee also decided that no team would be directly relegated at the end of the season. The last team would face the winner of the 2. Liga in the relegation play-offs.

=== Decision ===
The decision was made on 22 May after meeting of the Slovak Presidium of the Union of League Clubs (ÚLK) with representatives of Fortuna League clubs. The continuation of the competition depended on the voting of the clubs. They chose between restarting the league in full format, short format or abandoning the season.

Clubs' votes
Full format	Short format	End competition
Slovan Bratislava	DAC Dunajská Streda	AS Trenčín
MŠK Žilina	MFK Ružomberok	
Spartak Trnava	Zemplín Michalovce	
	FK Senica	
	FC ViOn Zlaté Moravce	
	FK Pohronie	
	FC Nitra	
	ŠKF Sereď	

Due to hygienic measures, the number of spectators at individual matches was limited. Until 30 June, a maximum of 500 spectators could be present at the stadiums, which, however, also included the teams' staff, the media or stewards. From 1 July, the number of spectators allowed to attend a match was increased to 50% of a stadium's capacity.

Revised schedule
Round	Original dates	Revised dates
23	14–15 March	13–14 June
24	21–22 March	20–21 June
25	4–5 April	27 June – 1 July
26	11–12 April	4 July
27	18–19 April	11 July
28	25–26 April	Cancelled
29	2–4 May	Cancelled
30	9 May	Cancelled
31	16 May	Cancelled
32	23 May	Cancelled

== Teams ==
Twelve teams competed in the league – the top eleven sides from the previous season and one team promoted from the 2. liga. The promoted team was Pohronie. They replaced Železiarne Podbrezová.

=== Stadiums and locations ===
Location of teams in Fortuna liga 2019–20

AS Trenčín	Dunajská Streda	FK Pohronie	Michalovce
Štadión pod Dubňom; UEFA	MOL Aréna; UEFA	Mestský štadión UEFA	Mestský futbalový štadión UEFA
Capacity: 11,258	Capacity: 12,700	Capacity: 2,309	Capacity: 4,440
FK Senica	MFK Ružomberok	MŠK Žilina	Slovan Bratislava
OMS Arena; UEFA	Štadión pod Čebraťom	Štadión pod Dubňom; UEFA	Tehelné pole UEFA
Capacity: 5,070	Capacity: 4,817	Capacity: 11,258	Capacity: 22,500
Spartak Trnava	ŠKF Sereď	Zlaté Moravce	FC Nitra
ŠAM – City Arena; UEFA	Stadium Myjava	Štadión FC ViOn; UEFA	Štadión pod Zoborom; UEFA
Capacity: 19,200	Capacity: 2,709	Capacity: 4,000	Capacity: 7,480

=== Personnel and kits ===
Team	President	Manager	Captain	Kitmaker	Shirt sponsor
AS Trenčín	(Slovakia) Jozef Liptovský	(Slovakia) Juraj Ančic (interim)	(Slovakia) Martin Šulek	(Germany) Adidas	ORION Tip
DAC Dunajská Streda	(Slovakia) Oszkár Világi	(Germany) Bernd Storck	(Hungary) Zsolt Kalmár	(Italy) macron	Kukkonia
FK Pohronie	(Slovakia) Jozef Urblík	(Slovakia) Mikuláš Radványi	(Czech Republic) Petr Pavlík	(Italy) Erreà	REMESLO
FK Senica	(Netherlands) Ton Caanen	(Slovakia) Patrik Durkáč	(Cameroon) Joss Didiba	(Denmark) hummel	KOMPLEXX GROUP SK
MFK Ružomberok	(Slovakia) Milan Fiľo	(Slovakia) Ján Haspra	(Slovakia) Ján Maslo	(Germany) Adidas	MAESTRO
MŠK Žilina	(Slovakia) Jozef Antošík	(Slovakia) Pavol Staňo	(Slovakia) Jakub Paur	(United States) Nike	Preto
Slovan Bratislava	(Slovakia) Ivan Kmotrík	(Slovakia) Ján Kozák jr.	(Bulgaria) Vasil Bozhikov	(Germany) Adidas	grafobal
FC Nitra	(Ukraine) Andriy Kolesnyk	(Slovakia) Ivan Galád	(Slovakia) Oliver Podhorín	(Germany) Adidas	–
Spartak Trnava	(Slovakia) Milan Cuninka	(Slovakia) Marián Šarmír	(Slovakia) Dobrivoj Rusov	(Germany) Adidas	#DOBRÝ ANJEL
Zlaté Moravce	(Slovakia) Karol Škula	(Slovakia) Karol Praženica	(Slovakia) Tomáš Ďubek	(Italy) Erreà	ViOn
MFK Michalovce	(Slovakia) Ján Sabol	(Slovakia) Jozef Majoroš (carateker)	(Slovakia) Igor Žofčák	(Germany) Adidas	ISDB, St. Nicolaus
ŠKF Sereď	(Slovakia) Róbert Stareček	(Slovakia) Peter Lérant	(Slovakia) Ľubomír Michalík	(United States) Nike	iClinic

=== Managerial changes ===
Team	Outgoing manager	Manner of departure	Date of vacancy	Position in table	Replaced by	Date of appointment
MFK Ružomberok	(Czech Republic) David Holoubek	End of contract	28 May 2019	Pre-season	(Slovakia) Ján Haspra	28 May 2019
FK Senica	(Portugal) Ricardo Chéu	Signed by Trnava	7 June 2019	Pre-season	(Czech Republic) Michal Ščasný	8 July 2019
FC Spartak Trnava	(Czech Republic) Michal Ščasný	End of contract	7 June 2019	Pre-season	(Portugal) Ricardo Chéu	7 June 2019
FC Nitra	(Slovakia) Michal Kuruc	End of contract	20 June 2019	Pre-season	(Slovakia) Marián Süttö	20 June 2019
AS Trenčín	(Slovakia) Ivan Galád	End of contract	30 June 2019	Pre-season	(Germany) Matthias Kohler	18 June 2019
ŠKF Sereď	(Czech Republic) Karel Stromšík	End of contract	28 June 2019	Pre-season	(North Macedonia) Slavche Vojneski	29 June 2019
ŠK Slovan Bratislava	(Slovakia) Martin Ševela	Released	18 July 2019	Pre-season	(Serbia) Vladimir Radenković (interim)	19 July 2019
ŠK Slovan Bratislava	(Serbia) Vladimir Radenković	Released	26 July 2019	1	(Slovakia) Ján Kozák jr.	26 July 2019
FK Pohronie	(Slovakia) Milan Nemec	Resigned	31 July 2019	11	(Slovakia) Rastislav Urgela (interim)	31 July 2019
FK Pohronie	(Slovakia) Rastislav Urgela	End of interim spell	20 August 2019	9	(Slovakia) Ján Rosinský	20 August 2019
FK Pohronie	(Slovakia) Ján Rosinský	Released	12 October 2019	11	(Slovakia) Mikuláš Radványi	14 October 2019
AS Trenčín	(Germany) Matthias Kohler	Released	22 October 2019	9	(Slovakia) Norbert Hrnčár	22 October 2019
FC Nitra	(Slovakia) Marián Süttö	Released	27 October 2019	11	(Slovakia) Gergely Geri	27 October 2019
MFK Zemplín Michalovce	(Slovakia) Anton Šoltis	Released	11 November 2019	10	(Slovakia) Jozef Majoroš (caretaker)	11 November 2019
ŠKF Sereď	(North Macedonia) Slavche Vojneski	End by own request	7 December 2019	10	(Slovakia) Roland Praj	20 December 2019
MŠK Žilina	(Slovakia) Jaroslav Kentoš	Moved to Slovakia U21	21 December 2019	2	(Slovakia) Pavol Staňo	2 January 2020
FC DAC 1904 Dunajská Streda	(Germany) Peter Hyballa	Released	3 January 2020	3	(Portugal) Hélder	5 January 2020
FC Nitra	(Slovakia) Gergely Geri	Released	6 January 2020	11	(Ukraine) Anatoliy Demyanenko	6 January 2020
ŠKF Sereď	(Slovakia) Roland Praj	Become GK coach	9 February 2020	10	(Slovakia) Peter Lérant	9 February 2019
FK Senica	(Czech Republic) Michal Ščasný	Released	12 February 2020	9	(Slovakia) Ján Bíreš	16 February 2019
FC Nitra	(Ukraine) Anatoliy Demyanenko	Unknown	11 April 2020	11	(Slovakia) Miroslav Nemec	11 April 2020
FC DAC 1904 Dunajská Streda	(Portugal) Hélder	End of contract	31 May 2020	3	(Germany) Bernd Storck	1 June 2020
FC Spartak Trnava	(Portugal) Ricardo Chéu	Released	5 June 2019	5	(Slovakia) Marián Šarmír	5 June 2019
FC Nitra	(Slovakia) Miroslav Nemec	End of Contract	30 June 2020	11	(Slovakia) Ivan Galád	30 June 2020
FK Senica	(Slovakia) Ján Bíreš	End of contract	30 June 2020	10	(Slovakia) Patrik Durkáč	30 June 2019
AS Trenčín	(Slovakia) Norbert Hrnčár	End of contract	30 June 2020	7	(Slovakia) Juraj Ančic	30 June 2020

== Regular stage ==
=== League table ===
Pos	Team	Pld	W	D	L	GF	GA	GD	Pts	Qualification
1	Slovan Bratislava	22	17	4	1	46	11	+35	55	Qualification for the championship group
2	Žilina	22	13	6	3	38	17	+21	45	Qualification for the championship group
3	DAC Dunajská Streda	22	11	5	6	31	25	+6	38	Qualification for the championship group
4	Spartak Trnava	22	9	3	10	25	26	−1	30	Qualification for the championship group
5	Zemplín Michalovce	22	8	6	8	28	32	−4	30	Qualification for the championship group
6	Ružomberok	22	6	10	6	25	27	−2	28	Qualification for the championship group
7	Trenčín	22	7	6	9	39	35	+4	27	Qualification for the relegation group
8	Zlaté Moravce	22	6	8	8	22	28	−6	26	Qualification for the relegation group
9	Senica	22	6	6	10	24	33	−9	24	Qualification for the relegation group
10	Sereď	22	5	7	10	23	34	−11	22	Qualification for the relegation group
11	Nitra	22	5	4	13	17	31	−14	19	Qualification for the relegation group
12	Pohronie	22	3	7	12	19	38	−19	16	Qualification for the relegation group

Source: Niké liga (in Slovak)
Rules for classification: 1) Points; 2) Head-to-head points; 3) Head-to-head goal difference; 4) Head-to-head away goals scored; 5) Play-off.

=== Results ===
Each team plays home-and-away against every other team in the league, for a total of 22 matches each.

Home \ Away	DAC	NIT	POH	RUZ	SEN	SER	SLO	TRN	TRE	ZMI	ZIL	ZLM
DAC Dunajská Streda		1–0	5–1	0–1	0–0	0–0	5–2	0–1	3–1	1–1	1–0	2–1
Nitra	1–2		0–0	1–2	1–4	3–2	0–1	1–0	1–1	0–2	0–0	0–1
Pohronie	0–2	0–3		1–2	0–0	2–1	1–3	2–2	0–4	2–2	0–1	1–1
Ružomberok	0–0	1–0	0–1		2–2	1–1	1–1	0–1	2–2	1–1	2–3	0–0
Senica	0–1	0–3	1–0	2–2		0–1	0–3	2–0	3–1	4–0	1–2	1–3
Sereď	3–1	0–1	3–3	2–2	2–1		0–4	2–1	1–1	0–2	0–3	0–0
Slovan Bratislava	2–0	4–0	2–1	1–0	2–0	2–0		2–0	2–0	3–0	1–1	4–0
Spartak Trnava	1–2	2–0	3–2	2–0	0–0	2–0	0–0		1–2	2–1	0–1	2–1
Trenčín	2–1	2–2	0–1	1–1	2–3	2–1	2–4	1–0		8–1	3–0	2–2
Zemplín Michalovce	5–0	1–0	1–0	0–1	3–0	1–1	0–1	2–0	2–1		0–3	2–2
Žilina	2–2	3–0	2–1	1–2	5–0	1–0	0–0	4–2	2–1	1–1		3–0
Zlaté Moravce	1–2	1–0	0–0	4–2	0–0	1–3	0–1	1–3	2–0	1–0	0–0	

Source: Niké liga (in Slovak)
Legend: Blue = home team win; Yellow = draw; Red = away team win.

== Championship group ==
Pos	Team	Pld	W	D	L	GF	GA	GD	Pts	Qualification	SLO	ŽIL	DAC	TRN	RUŽ	ZMI
1	Slovan Bratislava (C)	27	21	5	1	57	14	+43	68	Qualification for the Champions League first qualifying round	—	—	—	0–0	1–0	4–0
2	Žilina	27	15	6	6	48	25	+23	51	Qualification for the Europa League first qualifying round	2–3	—	—	2–1	—	5–0
3	DAC Dunajská Streda	27	15	5	7	42	28	+14	50	Qualification for the Europa League first qualifying round	1–3	2–0	—	—	—	5–0
4	Spartak Trnava	27	10	5	12	30	32	−2	35	Qualification for the Europa League play-offs	—	—	0–2	—	2–0	—
5	Ružomberok (O)	27	7	11	9	28	33	−5	32 (Note: Head-to-head points: Ružomberok 5, Zemplín Michalovce 2.)	Qualification for the Europa League play-offs	—	2–1	0–1	—	—	—
6	Zemplín Michalovce	27	8	8	11	31	49	−18	32	Qualification for the Europa League play-offs	—	—	—	2–2	1–1	—

Source: Niké liga (in Slovak)
Rules for classification: 1) Points; 2) Head-to-head points; 3) Head-to-head goal difference; 4) Head-to-head away goals scored; 5) Play-off.
(C) Champions; (O) Play-off winners

== Relegation group ==
Pos	Team	Pld	W	D	L	GF	GA	GD	Pts	Qualification or relegation	TRE	ZLM	SER	SEN	POH	NIT
7	Trenčín	27	11	6	10	52	43	+9	39	Qualification for the Europa League play-offs	—	—	3–2	—	4–0	0–3
8	Zlaté Moravce	27	8	9	10	27	33	−6	33		2–3	—	1–0	—	—	2–1
9	Sereď	27	6	9	12	29	41	−12	27		—	—	—	—	2–2	1–0
10	Senica	27	6	8	13	26	40	−14	26		1–3	0–0	1–1	—	—	—
11	Pohronie	27	6	8	13	25	44	−19	26		—	1–0	—	1–0	—	—
12	Nitra	27	7	4	16	23	36	−13	25	Qualification for the relegation play-offs	—	—	—	2–0	0–2	—

Source: Niké liga (in Slovak)
Rules for classification: 1) Points; 2) Head-to-head points; 3) Head-to-head goal difference; 4) Head-to-head away goals scored; 5) Play-off.

== Europa League play-offs ==
Should one of the top 3 teams win the 2019–20 Slovak Cup, Europa League qualification playoffs will be held among the 4th, 5th, 6th team in the championship group and the top team of the relegation round. On 8 July 2020, Slovan Bratislava, who have won the league title, also won the cup, thus confirming the need of playoffs.

The 4th team play the top team of the relegation group and the 5th play the 6th in the semifinals. Winners of the semifinals play the final to determine the Europa League qualification spot. Europa League qualification playoff games are one-leg and played at the home pitch of the higher-ranked team. The winners qualify for the first qualifying round of the 2020–21 UEFA Europa League.

=== Semi-finals ===
14 July 2020
18:00

MFK Ružomberok	1–0	Zemplín Michalovce
Twardzik 82' (pen.)	Report

Štadión pod Čebraťom, Ružomberok
Attendance: 1,045
Referee: Peter Kráľovič
14 July 2020
20:00

Spartak Trnava	3–0	AS Trenčín
Vukojević 42'; Cabral 83'; Sobczyk 87'	Report

Štadión Antona Malatinského, Trnava
Attendance: 2,737
Referee: Ivan Kružliak

=== Final ===
17 July 2020
18:00

Spartak Trnava	0–2	MFK Ružomberok
	Report	Maslo 81' (pen.); Takáč 90+3'

Štadión Antona Malatinského, Trnava
Attendance: 3,959
Referee: Erik Gemzický

== Relegation play-offs ==
The team placed bottom of the relegation group faced the first-placed team from the 2. Liga 2019–20 for a place in the league for the next season.

All times are CEST (UTC+2).

=== First leg ===
14 July 2020
17:00

FK Dubnica	0–0	FC Nitra
	Report

Mestský futbalový štadión, Dubnica nad Váhom
Attendance: 2,456 (Note: Due to the COVID-19 pandemic, a maximum of 50% of the stadium's capacity was available for sporting events.)
Referee: Michal Smolák

=== Second leg ===
17 July 2020
20:00

FC Nitra	3–0	FK Dubnica
Kóša 7'; Ristovski 20' (pen.); Hambálek 90'	Report

Štadión pod Zoborom, Nitra
Attendance: 3,057
Referee: Peter Kralovic

== Position by round ==
The table lists the positions of teams after each week of matches. In order to preserve chronological progress, any postponed matches are not included in the round at which they were originally scheduled but added to the full round they were played immediately afterwards. For example, if a match is scheduled for matchday 13, but then postponed and played between days 16 and 17, it will be added to the standings for day 16.

Leader – Qualification for Champions League first qualifying round
Qualification for Europa League first qualifying round
Qualification for First Football League Relegation play-offs

Team \ Round	1	2	3	4	5	6	7	8	9	10	11	12	13	14	15	16	17	18	19	20	21	22	23	24	25	26	27
Slovan	2	3	1	1	1	1	2	2	2	1	1	1	1	1	1	1	1	1	1	1	1	1	1	1	1	1	1
Žilina	1	1	2	2	2	2	1	1	1	2	2	2	2	2	3	3	3	2	2	2	2	2	2	2	2	2	2
Dun. Streda	5	2	3	4	3	3	3	3	3	3	3	3	3	3	2	2	2	3	3	3	3	3	3	3	3	3	3
Trnava	4	6	4	3	4	5	4	5	5	4	4	4	5	8	5	7	5	6	6	7	6	5	5	5	6	4	4
Ružomberok	6	4	7	7	8	8	9	10	9	7	7	5	6	4	4	4	4	4	4	4	4	6	6	6	4	5	5
Michalovce	12	12	12	11	10	9	10	8	7	8	8	10	10	9	10	10	8	5	8	5	7	4	4	4	5	6	6
Trenčín	9	9	10	8	5	4	6	6	6	6	6	9	8	7	8	6	7	8	5	6	5	7	7	7	7	7	7
Zlaté Moravce	7	7	6	6	6	6	5	4	4	5	5	6	4	5	6	5	6	7	7	9	9	8	8	8	8	8	8
Sereď	11	8	5	5	7	7	7	7	8	9	9	7	7	6	7	8	10	10	10	10	10	10	10	10	9	9	9
Senica	3	5	8	12	11	11	12	12	12	10	10	8	9	10	9	9	9	9	9	8	8	9	9	9	10	10	10
Pohronie	10	11	9	9	9	10	8	11	11	12	11	11	12	12	12	12	12	12	12	12	12	12	12	12	12	11	11
Nitra	8	10	11	10	12	12	11	9	10	11	12	12	11	11	11	11	11	11	11	11	11	11	11	11	11	12	12

Source: Niké liga (in Slovak)

== Season statistics ==
As of 11 July 2020

=== Top goalscorers ===
Rank	Player	Club	Goals
1	(Slovenia) Andraž Šporar	Slovan	12
2	(North Macedonia) Milan Ristovski^{a}	Nitra	11
3	(Ghana) Osman Bukari	Trenčín	10
4	(Brazil) Rafael Ratão	Slovan	9
4	(Slovakia) Ján Bernát	Žilina	9
4	(Hungary) Zsolt Kalmár	DAC D.Streda	9
7	(Colombia) Frank Castañeda	Senica	8
7	(Niger) Issa Modibo Sidibé	Michalovce	8
7	(Slovakia) Tomáš Ďubek	Z.Moravce	8
7	(Croatia) Ante Roguljić	Trenčín	8

^{a} plus 1 play-off goal

=== Hat-tricks ===
Round	Player	For	Against	Result	Date	Ref
10	(Hungary) Dávid Holman	Slovan	FC Nitra	5–0 (H)	28 September 2019	
19	(Ghana) Osman Bukari	Trenčín	Michalovce	8–1 (H)	15 February 2020	
1.CH	(Croatia) Marko Divković	Dunajská Streda	Michalovce	5–0 (H)	13 June 2020	

=== Clean sheets ===
Rank	Player	Club	Clean sheets
1	(Slovakia) Dominik Greif	Slovan	13
2	(Slovakia) Dominik Holec	Žilina	11
3	(Slovakia) Branislav Pindroch	Zl. Moravce	10
4	(Czech Republic) Martin Jedlička	D.Streda	9
5	(Czech Republic) Vojtěch Vorel	Senica	8
5	(Slovakia) Dávid Šípoš	Nitra	8
7	(Slovakia) Dobrivoj Rusov	Trnava	7
7	(Slovakia) Matúš Kira	Michalovce	7
9	(Slovakia) Tomáš Jenčo	Pohronie	6
10	(Slovakia) Michal Šulla	Slovan	5

=== Discipline ===
==== Player ====
- Most yellow cards: 9
  - (Slovakia) Martin Šulek (Trenčín)
- Most red cards: 2
  - (Slovakia) Alexander Mojžiš (Ružomberok)

==== Club ====
- Most yellow cards: 67
  - FC ViOn Zlaté Moravce
- Most red cards: 4
  - FC Spartak Trnava
  - ŠKF Sereď

== Awards ==
=== Monthly awards ===
Month	Player of the Month		Goal of the Month		Reference
Month	Player	Club	Player	Club	Reference
August	(Slovakia) Ján Bernát	Žilina	(Austria) Alex Sobczyk	Spartak Trnava	
September	(Slovakia) Dávid Strelec	Slovan Bratislava	(Panama) Eric Davis	DAC Dunajská Streda	
October	(Slovakia) Dominik Holec	Žilina	(Slovenia) Andraž Šporar	Slovan Bratislava	
November	(Slovenia) Andraž Šporar	Slovan Bratislava	(Hungary) Zsolt Kalmár	DAC Dunajská Streda	
December	(Slovenia) Andraž Šporar	Slovan Bratislava	(Hungary) Zsolt Kalmár	DAC Dunajská Streda	
February	(Slovakia) Dominik Greif	Slovan Bratislava	(Slovakia) Lukáš Jánošík	Žilina	
March	(Slovakia) Dominik Greif	Slovan Bratislava	(Slovakia) Lukáš Jánošík	Žilina	
June	Not announced		(Panama) César Blackman	DAC Dunajská Streda	
July	Not announced		(Panama) César Blackman	DAC Dunajská Streda	

=== Team of the Season ===

Team of the Season was:

- Goalkeeper: (Slovakia) Dominik Greif (Slovan Bratislava)
- Defence: (Czech Republic) Jurij Medveděv (Slovan Bratislava), (Netherlands) Myenty Abena (Slovan Bratislava), (Bulgaria) Vasil Bozhikov (Slovan Bratislava), (Panama) Eric Davis (DAC Dunajská Streda)
- Midfield: (Ghana) Osman Bukari (Trenčín), (Slovakia) Miroslav Káčer (Žilina), (Hungary) Dávid Holman (Slovan Bratislava), (Hungary) Zsolt Kalmár (DAC Dunajská Streda), (Morocco) Moha (Slovan Bratislava)
- Attack: (Slovenia) Andraž Šporar (Slovan Bratislava)

=== Top Eleven U-21 ===
- Goalkeeper: (Czech Republic) Martin Jedlička (DAC Dunajská Streda)
- Defence: (Panama) César Blackman (DAC Dunajská Streda), (Slovakia) Martin Šulek (Trenčín), (Ukraine) Danylo Beskorovainyi (DAC Dunajská Streda), (Slovakia) Alexander Mojžiš (Ružomberok)
- Midfield: (Ghana) Osman Bukari (Trenčín), (Slovakia) Marián Chobot (Nitra), (Nigeria) Abdul Zubairu (Trenčín), (Slovakia) Ján Bernát (Žilina), (Slovakia) Martin Kovaľ (Zlaté Moravce)
- Attack: (North Macedonia) Milan Ristovski (Nitra)

=== Individual awards ===
Manager of the season

(Slovakia) Ján Kozák jr. (Slovan Bratislava)

Player of the Year

(Slovakia) Dominik Greif (Slovan Bratislava)

Young player of the Year

(Slovakia) Ján Bernát (Žilina)

== See also ==
- 2019–20 Slovak Cup
- 2019–20 2. Liga (Slovakia)
- List of Slovak football transfers summer 2019
- List of Slovak football transfers winter 2019–20
- List of foreign Slovak First League players
