= Luís Ramírez (footballer, born 1997) =

Venezuelan footballer

Personal information
- Full name: Luís Alejandro Ramírez López
- Date of birth: 2 July 1997 (age 29)
- Place of birth: Caracas, Venezuela
- Height: 1.78 m (5 ft 10 in)
- Position: Midfielder

Team information
- Current team: Caracas
- Number: 11

Senior career*
Years	Team	Apps	(Gls)
2015–2019	Estudiantes de Caracas	37	(4)
2019	→ Senica (loan)	13	(0)
2020–	Caracas	6	(0)
- * Club domestic league appearances and goals as of 17:44, 17 June 2021 (UTC)

Luis Alejandro Ramírez López (born 2 July 1997) is a Venezuelan footballer who currently plays as a midfielder for Caracas.

== Career statistics ==
=== Club ===
As of 25 July 2019.

Club	Season	League			Cup		Continental		Other		Total	
Club	Season	Division	Apps	Goals	Apps	Goals	Apps	Goals	Apps	Goals	Apps	Goals
Estudiantes de Caracas	2015	Venezuelan Primera División	17	1	0	0	–		0	0	2	0
Estudiantes de Caracas	2016	Venezuelan Primera División	26	2	6 (Note: Appearances in the Copa Venezuela)	1	–		0	0	0	0
Estudiantes de Caracas	2017	Venezuelan Segunda División	–		4	1	2 (Note: Appearances in the Copa Sudamericana)	1	0	0	6	2
Estudiantes de Caracas	2018	Venezuelan Primera División	9	1	0	0	–		0	0	2	0
Estudiantes de Caracas	2019	Venezuelan Primera División	2	0	0	0	–		0	0	2	0
Estudiantes de Caracas	Total		54	4	10	2	2	1	0	0	66	7
Senica (loan)	2019–20	First League	0	0	0	0	0	0	0	0	0	0
Career total			54	4	10	2	2	1	0	0	66	7
