= Žan Medved =

Slovenian footballer (born 1999)

Personal information
- Date of birth: 14 June 1999 (age 27)
- Place of birth: Slovenj Gradec, Slovenia
- Height: 1.85 m (6 ft 1 in)
- Position: Forward

Team information
- Current team: Slovácko (on loan from Nyíregyháza Spartacus)
- Number: 55

Youth career
- Aluminij
- 2014–2015: Maribor
- 2015–2017: Aluminij
- 2017–2018: Olimpija Ljubljana

Senior career*
Years	Team	Apps	(Gls)
2016–2017	Aluminij	1	(1)
2017–2020	Olimpija Ljubljana	0	(0)
2018–2019	→ Fužinar (loan)	17	(10)
2019	→ Vis Pesaro (loan)	2	(0)
2019–2020	→ Fužinar (loan)	19	(14)
2020–2023	Slovan Bratislava	31	(6)
2020–2022	Slovan Bratislava B	11	(8)
2021	→ Wisła Kraków (loan)	13	(0)
2021–2022	→ Celje (loan)	21	(4)
2023	→ Skalica (loan)	8	(1)
2023–2025	FC Košice	43	(18)
2025–	Nyíregyháza Spartacus	13	(0)
2025–	→ Slovácko (loan)	7	(0)

International career
2014	Slovenia U16	2	(0)
2015–2016	Slovenia U17	15	(4)
2020–2021	Slovenia U21	7	(2)
- * Club domestic league appearances and goals as of 23:09, 22 March 2026 (UTC)

Žan Medved (born 14 June 1999) is a Slovenian professional footballer who plays as a forward for Czech club Slovácko, on loan from Hungarian club Nyíregyháza Spartacus.

== Club career ==
Medved made his professional Slovak First League debut for Slovan Bratislava during a home fixture, at Tehelné pole, against AS Trenčín on 22 February 2020. He came on as an 80th-minute replacement for Rafael Ratão, with the final score already set at 2–0 for Slovan.

On 2 September 2025, Medved joined Czech First League club Slovácko on a one-year loan deal from Hungarian team Nyíregyháza Spartacus with an option to make the transfer permanent.

== Honours ==
Slovan Bratislava

- Slovak First League: 2019–20
- Slovak Cup: 2019–20
