= Ján Kozák (footballer, born 1980) =

Slovak footballer (born 1980)

Personal information
- Date of birth: 22 April 1980 (age 46)
- Place of birth: Košice, Czechoslovakia
- Height: 1.91 m (6 ft 3 in)
- Position: Midfielder

Youth career
- 1988–1996: Lokomotíva Košice
- 1996–1997: 1. FC Košice

Senior career*
Years	Team	Apps	(Gls)
1997–2000	1. FC Košice	18	(6)
1998–1999	→ Lokeren (loan)	5	(0)
2000–2002	Slavia Prague	13	(0)
2002–2003	1.FC Košice	34	(6)
2003–2009	Artmedia Petržalka	160	(40)
2006	→ West Bromwich Albion (loan)	6	(0)
2009–2010	Slovan Bratislava	30	(3)
2010–2011	Politehnica Timişoara	10	(1)
2011–2012	AEL	3	(0)
2012–2013	Bunyodkor	21	(5)
2013–2014	DSG Union Perg	4	(1)
2014–2015	SV Stripfing	10	(3)
Total		300	(61)

International career
2004–2010	Slovakia	25	(2)

Managerial career
- 2015–2019: Slovan Bratislava B
- 2019–2020: Slovan Bratislava
- 2023–2024: FC Košice
- * Club domestic league appearances and goals

Ján Kozák (born 22 April 1980) is a Slovak football coach and former player. Recently, he was the manager of Slovak 1st tier team FC Košice.

== Club career ==
A midfielder, Kozák joined Bratislava in the year 2003, winning the Corgoň Liga with the club the very next season, 2004–05. He scored 7 goals in 34 appearances in the season.

In 2005–06, he played in 11 matches for the club, scoring three goals, before moving to West Bromwich Albion in January 2006. He made his debut for Albion on 4 February 2006, coming on as a substitute for Geoff Horsfield in a Premier League match against Blackburn Rovers. He was not considered good enough for the then manager Bryan Robson to sign, so left at the end of his loan spell.

He made his debut for Poli Timișoara in an away match at Gloria Bistriţa. On 21 July 2010, he was released.

Ján Kozák ended his career playing in the Austrian 2. Landesliga for DSG Union Perg. and SV Stripfing.

== International career ==
He made his first appearance for Slovakia on 30 November 2004, a 1–0 win against Hungary.

Kozák has played in Euro 2008 qualifying and 2010 FIFA World Cup qualification. He was selected to take the captain's armband. He also made the squad for Slovakia's World Cup debut in 2010.

== Managerial career ==
On 1 August 2015, he became the head coach of Slovan Bratislava B. He was named the interim manager of the first team in July 2019. After a successful spell as interim coach, Kozák was given the role on a permanent basis in August 2019. He subsequently progressed with Slovan into the group stage of Europa League and won the Slovak double. He was sacked by the club in September 2020.

== Personal life ==
Kozak' father, Ján, was also former national player. He has 55 caps for Czechoslovakia and was also head coach of Slovakia. His nephew Filip Lesniak is also a professional footballer.

== Footgolf ==
As a footgolfer, he won the bronze medal in the 2016 FootGolf World Cup held in Argentina.

== Career statistics ==
Scores and results list Slovakia's goal tally first, score column indicates score after each Kozák goal.

List of international goals scored by Ján Kozák
No.	Date	Venue	Opponent	Score	Result	Competition
1	11 October 2008	Serravalle, San Marino	San Marino	2–0	3–1	2010 FIFA World Cup qualification
2	6 June 2009	Bratislava, Slovakia	San Marino	5–0	7–0	2010 FIFA World Cup qualification

== Honours ==
=== Player ===
MFK Kosiče

- Corgoň liga: 1997–98,

Artmedia Petržalka

- Corgoň liga: 2004–05, 2007–08
- Slovak Cup: 2003–04, 2007–08

Slovan Bratislava

- Corgoň liga: 2009–10,

FC Bunyodkor

- Uzbekistan Super League: 2013
- Uzbekistan Cup: 2012

=== Manager ===
Slovan Bratislava

- Fortuna Liga: 2019–20
- Slovnaft Cup: 2019–20

=== Individual ===
- Slovak Manager of the Year: 2019
