= Denis Petro =

Slovak footballer

Personal information
- Date of birth: 18 June 1999 (age 27)
- Place of birth: Michalovce, Slovakia
- Height: 1.83 m (6 ft 0 in)
- Positions: Centre-back; left-back

Team information
- Current team: UMass Lowell River Hawks

Youth career
- Partizán Bardejov
- Cherrybrook FC
- –2015: Partizán Bardejov
- 2014–2015: Zemplín Michalovce
- 2016–2018: Lazio

College career
Years	Team	Apps	(Gls)
2019–	UMass Lowell River Hawks	18	(1)

Senior career*
Years	Team	Apps	(Gls)
2017	Lazio	0	(0)
2018–2019	Zemplín Michalovce	6	(0)
2021	Seacoast United Phantoms		
2024	Boston Bolts		

International career^{‡}
2016–2017	Slovakia U17	3	(0)
2017	Slovakia U18	3	(1)
2017–2018	Slovakia U19	5	(0)
- * Club domestic league appearances and goals as of 31 December 2019 ‡ National team caps and goals as of 24 March 2018

Denis Petro (born 18 June 1999) is a professional Slovak footballer who plays for American college team UMass Lowell River Hawks as a defender.

== Club career ==
=== MFK Zemplín Michalovce ===
Petro made his professional Fortuna Liga debut for Zemplín Michalovce against Ružomberok on 13 April 2019. Petro played 90 minutes of the 0–1 away loss.
