= Boris Cmiljanić =

Montenegrin footballer

Personal information
- Date of birth: 17 March 1996 (age 30)
- Place of birth: Bijelo Polje, FR Yugoslavia
- Height: 1.93 m (6 ft 4 in)
- Position: Forward

Team information
- Current team: Sepsi OSK
- Number: 9

Youth career
- –2012: Budućnost Podgorica
- 2014–2015: PSV

Senior career*
Years	Team	Apps	(Gls)
2012–2014	Budućnost Podgorica	28	(2)
2014–2016	Jong PSV	28	(3)
2016–2017	Huesca	8	(0)
2017	→ Levante B (loan)	12	(0)
2018–2021	Slovan Bratislava	16	(1)
2019–2020	→ Admira Wacker (loan)	8	(1)
2020	→ Zlaté Moravce (loan)	6	(1)
2021–2022	Sarajevo	17	(2)
2022–2023	Dečić	25	(7)
2023–2024	Kyzylzhar	19	(4)
2024–2025	Karmiotissa	25	(5)
2025–	Sepsi OSK	23	(3)

International career
2011–2012	Montenegro U17	5	(1)
2013	Montenegro U18	1	(0)
2013–2015	Montenegro U19	12	(2)
2015–2018	Montenegro U21	6	(1)
- * Club domestic league appearances and goals as of 8 November 2026

Boris Cmiljanić (Montenegrin Cyrillic: Борис Цмиљанић, born 17 March 1996) is a Montenegrin professional footballer who plays as a forward for Liga I club Sepsi OSK.

== Club career ==
=== Budućnost Podgorica ===
After spending years in the club's youth system, Cmiljanić made his professional debut with Budućnost Podgorica at the age of 16. At the beginning of the 2013-14 season, he was sidelined for three months due to injury.

=== PSV ===
On 16 June 2014 it was announced that Cmiljanić signed with PSV Eindhoven on a three-year contract after several trials and negotiations. He made his professional debut as Jong PSV player in the second division on 9 August 2014 against Achilles '29. He replaced Elvio van Overbeek after 77 minutes in a 2–0 home win.

=== Huesca ===
On 4 July 2016, Cmiljanić signed a three-year contract with Spanish Segunda División side Huesca, as a free agent. He made his debut for the club on 20 August, in a 0–0 away draw against Alcorcón.

On 15 January 2017, after appearing rarely, Cmiljanić was loaned to Segunda División B club Atlético Levante UD until June. On 14 September, he cut ties with the club.

=== Slovan ===
==== Admira Wacker ====
On 2 August 2019, he joined Austrian club Admira Wacker on loan with a purchase option.

== Honours ==
Budućnost Podgorica

- Montenegrin Cup: 2012–13

Slovan Bratislava

- Slovak First Football League: 2018–19
- Slovak Cup: 2017–18

Sarajevo

- Bosnian Cup: 2021–22
