= Alex Sobczyk =

Austrian footballer

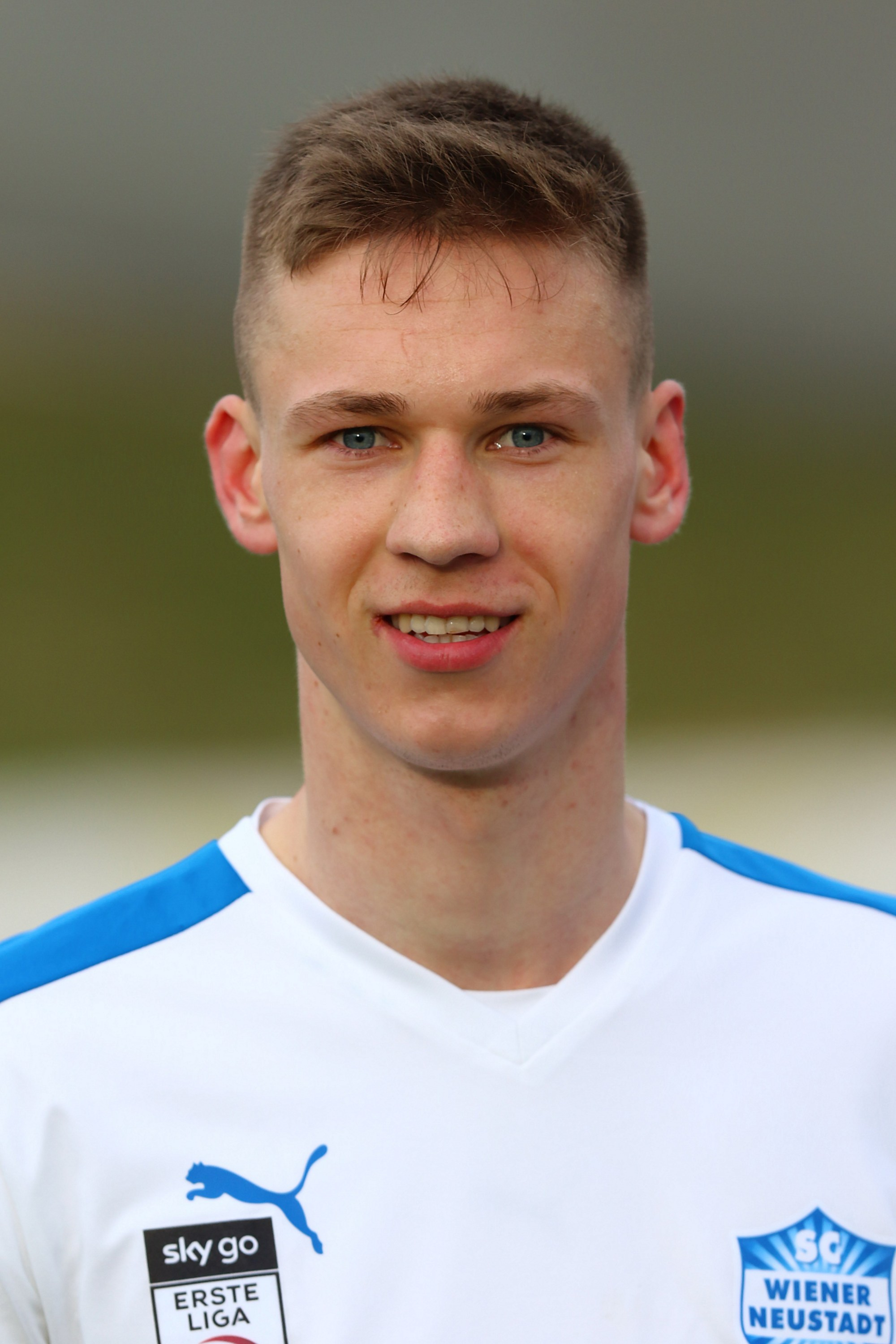
- Sobczyk with SC Wiener Neustadt (2018)

Personal information
- Date of birth: 20 May 1997 (age 29)
- Place of birth: Vienna, Austria
- Height: 1.87 m (6 ft 2 in)
- Position: Forward

Team information
- Current team: Hibernians

Youth career
- 2004–2007: Wiener Sportklub
- 2007–2015: Rapid Wien

Senior career*
Years	Team	Apps	(Gls)
2013–2015	Rapid Wien II	16	(9)
2015	Liefering	2	(0)
2016–2017	Rapid Wien II	43	(21)
2017–2019	Rapid Wien	2	(0)
2017–2018	→ SKN St. Pölten (loan)	6	(0)
2018	→ Wiener Neustadt (loan)	3	(0)
2018–2019	→ Floridsdorfer AC (loan)	27	(3)
2019–2020	Spartak Trnava	26	(8)
2020–2022	Górnik Zabrze	27	(3)
2022–2023	Doxa Katokopias	17	(2)
2023	Piast Gliwice	10	(0)
2023–2024	Skalica	26	(1)
2024–2025	Skalica	17	(3)
2025–2026	Posušje	17	(1)
2026	Floridsdorfer AC	12	(3)
2026–	Hibernians	0	(0)

International career
2013	Austria U17	2	(1)
2015	Austria U18	5	(1)
2015–2016	Austria U19	3	(0)
- * Club domestic league appearances and goals as of 17 May 2026

Alex Sobczyk (born 20 May 1997) is an Austrian professional footballer who plays as a forward for Maltese Premier League club Hibernians.

== Club career ==
Sobczyk made his Austrian Football First League debut for Liefering on 24 July 2015 in a game against Austria Klagenfurt.

== Honours ==
Individual

- Slovak Super Liga Goal of the Month: August 2019
