= Jakub Kadák =

Slovak international footballer

Personal information
- Date of birth: 14 December 2000 (age 25)
- Place of birth: Trenčín, Slovakia
- Height: 1.78 m (5 ft 10 in)
- Position: Midfielder

Team information
- Current team: Dukla Prague
- Number: 26

Youth career
- 2007–2010: Trenčianske Stankovce
- 2010–2019: Trenčín

Senior career*
Years	Team	Apps	(Gls)
2018–2022	Trenčín	81	(19)
2022–2025	Luzern	62	(6)
2025–	Dukla Prague	15	(1)

International career^{‡}
2016–2017	Slovakia U17	3	(0)
2020–2021	Slovakia U21	17	(4)
2023–	Slovakia	1	(0)
- * Club domestic league appearances and goals as of 15 May 2026 ‡ National team caps and goals as of 22:02, 5 June 2024 (UTC)

Jakub Kadák (born 14 December 2000) is a Slovak professional footballer who plays as an attacking midfielder for Czech First League club Dukla Prague and the Slovakia national team.

== Early life ==
Kadák developed an interest in football when he was four years old. He went to watch it with his older brother, who was playing for Stankovec. The club's coach recommended Kadák to try football, to which he accepted.

== Club career ==
Kadák made his Fortuna Liga debut for AS Trenčín against Spartak Trnava on 10 March 2018. Trenčín lost the game to the later champions 1–2. Kadák replaced Lukáš Skovajsa in the 80th minute.

On 18 July 2022, Kadák joined Swiss Super League club Luzern, signing a four-year contract. After a 0–2 loss against FC Sion in August 2023, he suffered a serious knee injury and was sidelined for the rest of the season.

On 22 August 2025, Kadák signed a three-year contract with Czech First League club Dukla Prague.

== International career ==
Kadák represented Slovakia national under-21 football team under Jaroslav Kentoš in 2023 Under-21 European Championship qualifiers against Northern Ireland and Spain, being called up on 17 March.

On 16 March 2022, Kadák received his first call-up to the Slovak senior squad by coach Štefan Tarkovič as a back-up footballer ahead of two international friendly matches against Norway and Finland. He was also an alternate for June fixtures. In November 2023, he made his debut during the UEFA Euro 2024 qualifying against Bosnia and Herzegovina.

== Style of play ==
Kadák's style of play has been compared to those of Marek Hamšík, Ondrej Duda, and Marek Mintál.

== Honours ==
Individual

- Slovak Super Liga Player of the Month: July/August 2021
- Slovak Super Liga Top Score: 2021–22
- Slovak Super Liga Young Player of the Season: 2021–22
- Slovak Super Liga Team of the Season: 2021–22
- Slovak Super Liga U-21 Team of the Season: 2021–22
