= Ján Haspra =

Slovak footballer and manager

Personal information
- Full name: Ján Haspra
- Date of birth: 29 May 1969 (age 57)
- Place of birth: Czechoslovakia
- Position: Forward

Team information
- Current team: Liptovský Mikuláš (manager)

Youth career
- Ružomberok

Senior career*
Years	Team	Apps	(Gls)
−1996	Ružomberok		
1996	Chrudim		
1996	Opava		
1997	Havířov		
1997–1998	SYNOT Staré Město		
1998–2012	Martin		
2003	→ OŠK Ludrová (loan)		
2010	→ OŠK Bešeňová (loan)		
2012	→ ŠK Lúčky - kúpele (loan)		

Managerial career
- 2015–2017: Liptovský Hrádok
- 2017–2019: Ružomberok II
- 2019–2021: Ružomberok
- 2021–2022: Ružomberok (scout)
- 2022: FC Petržalka
- 2023: Dolný Kubín
- 2023–: Liptovský Mikuláš
- * Club domestic league appearances and goals as of 6 June 2023

Ján Haspra (born 29 May 1969) is a Slovak professional football manager and former player who is currently manager of 2. Liga club MFK Tatran Liptovský Mikuláš.
