= Michal Šulla =

Slovak footballer

Personal information
- Date of birth: 15 July 1991 (age 35)
- Place of birth: Myjava, Czechoslovakia
- Height: 1.92 m (6 ft 4 in)
- Position: Goalkeeper

Team information
- Current team: Inter Bratislava
- Number: 24

Youth career
- Senica

Senior career*
Years	Team	Apps	(Gls)
2010–2017	Senica	122	(0)
2010–2012	→ Vrbové (loan)	?	(?)
2012	→ Spartak Myjava (loan)	7	(0)
2018–2023	Slovan Bratislava	34	(0)
2023	Spartak Trnava	0	(0)
2024	Líšeň	4	(0)
2024-	Inter Bratislava	52	(0)

International career
2010	Slovakia U19	2	(0)
2011–2013	Slovakia U21	8	(0)
2017–2018	Slovakia	3	(0)
- * Club domestic league appearances and goals as of 25 May 2026

Michal Šulla (born 15 July 1991) is a Slovak professional footballer who plays as a goalkeeper for Inter Bratislava.

== Club career ==
=== Early career ===
Michal Šulla began his career at FK Senica, where he went through various youth categories. In 2010, he fought his way up to the A-team. In 2012, he played for the clubs MFK Vrbové and Spartak Myjava. He made his professional Corgoň Liga debut for Spartak Myjava against Tatran Prešov on 1 September 2012. Myjava won the game 2-0.

=== Slovan Bratislava ===
Thanks to his positive performances in the Senica jersey, he earned a transfer to ŠK Slovan Bratislava in 2018, with the club paying 200 thousand euros for him. Šulla won five titles with the club.

=== Later career ===
On 28 September 2023, he signed for FC Spartak Trnava, but he did not play a single match in their jersey.

On 12 September 2024, it was announced that Šulla would be joining 3. Liga club FK Inter Bratislava.

== International career ==
Šulla was called up for two unofficial friendly fixtures in January 2017. He made his debut on 8 January 2017 against Uganda, conceding two goals in the first half - by Moses Oloya (6th minute) and Farouk Miya (14th minute). Slovakia went on to lose 1–3. Šulla did not play in the 0–6 loss against Sweden later that week.

He earned another cap in the final match of the 2018 King's Cup, on 25 March 2018, in a 3–2 victory over Thailand, despite being benched in the 2–1 semi-final victory over UAE three days earlier. In the 42nd minute Šulla conceded a controversial goal; an attempted pass to Róbert Mazáň went straight to the foot of Teerasil Dangda, who found Jakkaphan Kaewprom, who enjoyed a de facto empty net to score to - 2–1.

== Honours ==
Slovan Bratislava

- Fortuna Liga (4): 2018–19, 2019–20, 2020–21, 2021–22
- Slovnaft Cup (3): 2017–18, 2019–20, 2020–21
