= 2019–20 Slovak Cup =

Tournament details
- Country: Slovakia
- Teams: 234

Final positions
- Champions: Slovan Bratislava
- Runners-up: Ružomberok

The 2019–20 Slovak Cup was the 51st edition of the competition. The tournament began on 20 July 2019 and the final was played on 8 July 2020.

Spartak Trnava were the defending champions, defeating Žilina in the 2019 final.

Slovan Bratislava won their sixteenth Slovak Cup title, defeating Ružomberok in the final.

== Format ==
Matches which were level after regulation advanced to penalties to determine a winner. Each round of the cup was contested over one leg with the exception of the semi-finals which were contested over two legs.

== First round ==
98 matches in the first round were played from 20 July 2019 to 7 August 2019.

Team 1	Score	Team 2
FK Kamenica nad Cirochou	1–0	MFK Snina
OFK Sečovská Polianka	4–4 (4–2 p)	OFK Tatran Bystré
TJ Jasenov	3–4	ŠK Strážske
OFK AGRIFOP Stakčín	3–5	TJ Slovan Belá nad Cirochou
TJ Ptava NV Ptičie	0–5	MŠK Spartak Medzilaborce
ŠK Sačurov	0–10	MFK Vranov nad Topľou
OFK Tatran Kračúnovce	3–2	MFK Slovan Giraltovce
OŠK Budkovce	3–5	TJ Mladosť Kalša
TJ HORNÁD Ždaňa	4–2	FK Čaňa
FK Košická Nová Ves	1–3	FK Kechnec
TJ Družstevník Čečejovce	2–6	MFK Ťahanovce
OFK Slovan Poproč	0–2	MFK Spartak Medzev
FK Geča 73	1–4	Slávia TU Košice
FK 05 Levoča	3–4	MŠK Spišské Podhradie
ŠK Harichovce	1–3	OŠK Rudňany
TJ Štart Hrabušice	5–0	FK Veľká Lomnica
TJ Tatran Ľubica	0–4	MFK Stará Ľubovňa
MŠK Slavoj Spišská Belá	0–2	ŠK Odeva Lipany
MFK Slovan Sabinov	0–5	MŠK Tesla Stropkov
FK Široké	2–5	OŠFK Šarišské Michaľany
FK Demjata	8–1	OŠK Fintice
FC Pivovar Veľký Šariš	2–1	FK Gerlachov
TJ Slovan Brvnište	0–2	TJ KOVO Beluša
TJ Spartak Kvašov	0–2	OŠK Trenčianske Stankovce
OK Častkovce	2–1	Spartak Myjava
MFC SPARTAK Bánovce nad Bebravou	0–3	AFC Nové Mesto nad Váhom
MŠK Hurbanovo	0–2	FK Marcelová
OFK Kovarce	1–1 (3–4 p)	OFK Solčany
TJ Družstevník Zvončín	2–1	MFK Vrbové
FK Podkonice	2–1	ŠK Dynamo Diviaky
ŠK Báb	0–1	ŠK Šoporňa
TJ Družstevník Trstice	2–2 (2–3 p)	TJ Kostolné Kračany
FK BREZNO	1–1 (4–2 p)	ŠK Partizán Čierny Balog
TJ Plevník-Drienové	3–1	TJ Partizán Prečín
ŠK Vegum Dolné Vestenice	3–2	FC Baník Prievidza
FK Junior Kanianka	1–1 (1–3 p)	TJ Slovan Zemianske Kostoľany
MFK Baník Handlová	1–4	OFK Baník Lehota pod Vtáčnikom
TJ Tatran Uhrovec	2–1	FK TEMPO Partizánske
TJ AGRO Zemné	2–6	TJ Družstevník Bešeňov
TJ Družstevník Dvory nad Žitavou	3–10	FKM Nové Zámky
TJ Salka	1–3	FK Slovan Levice
FK Activ Veľké Kosihy	2–2 (4–2 p)	FK Kolárovo
ŠK Kmeťovo	0–2	ŠK Šurany
FC Komjatice	1–2	TJ Veľké Lovce
ŠK Podlužany	1–1 (7–8 p)	OFK Veľký Ďur
PFK Piešťany	3–3 (5–6 p)	TJ Družstevník Jacovce
ŠK Veľké Zálužie	1–4	MFK Alekšince
OFK Veľké Ripňany	3–3 (4–2 p)	TJ Slovan Krušovce
FC Pata	w/o	FC Slovan Hlohovec
TJ Družstevník Špačince	1–2	FK Bestrent Horná Krupá
FC JELKA	0–3	FC Slovan Galanta
TJ Družstevník Malá Mača	6–2	FK Voderady
TJ Baník Brodské	0–2	TJ Družstevník Radimov
TJ Slavoj Moravský Svätý Ján	0–3	TJ Nafta Gbely
OFK Mokrý Háj	0–2	TJ Slavoj Boleráz
TJ Slovan Skalité	0–2	TJ Tatran Krásno nad Kysucou
FK Tatran Turzovka	0–2	MFK Kysucké Nové Mesto
TJ Pokrok Stará Bystrica	2–1	ŠK Čierne
TJ Tatran Oščadnica	0–3	TJ Spartak Vysoká nad Kysucou
OFK Kotešová	1–4	ŠK Javorník Makov
FK Predmier	3–1	TJ Višňové
TJ Slovan Magura Vavrečka	0–2	TJ Tatran Oravské Veselé
Oravan Oravská Jasenica	0–2	MŠK Námestovo
TJ Fatran Varín	0–2	OŠK Baník Stráňavy
TJ Družstevník Dlhá nad Oravou	1–6	MŠK Fomat Martin
FK Slovan Trstená	1–5	TJ Družstevník Liptovská Štiavnica
OŠK Bešeňová	2–3	TJ Tatran Chlebnice
OŠK Dobrá Niva	1–12	MFK Lokomotíva Zvolen
OŠK Likavka	1–2	ŠK Závažná Poruba
FC Attack Vrútky	1–4	FK Strečno
FK Nižná	0–4	ŠK Tvrdošín
TJ Lovča	0–6	ŠK Prameň Kováčová
FK 09 Bacúch	1–3	TJ Sokol Medzibrod
MFK Strojár Krupina	2–3	TJ Tatran VLM Pliešovce
FK FILJO Ladomerská Vieska	1–2	FK Rakytovce
OTJ Hontianske Nemce	1–0	FK Sitno Banská Štiavnica
FK Selce	3–0	ŠK Badín
ŠK Hrochoť	1–1 (7–8 p)	FK Šalková
OŠK Lieskovec	3–1	MFK Spartak Hriňová
MFK Revúca	0–3	MŠK Tisovec
FK Iskra Hnúšťa	0–2	FC 98 Hajnáčka
Baník Veľký Krtíš	1–3	MŠK Novohrad Lučenec
OŠK Radzovce	2–5	TJD Príbelce
TJ Vinohrad Čebovce	0–1	FK Slovenské Ďarmoty
FK Jesenské	1–5	FTC Fiľakovo
OŠK Dubovany	1–8	OFK Malženice
ŠK Belá	3–1	MFK Dolný Kubín
TJ Považan Pruské	1–8	TJ Partizán Domaniža
ŠK Gbeľany	1–3	TJ Družstevník Oravská
OŠK Švošov	2–2 (4–3 p)	FK Slovan Žabokreky
ŠK Nevidzany	2–3	OFK 1948 Veľký Lapáš
FK Lokomotíva Devínska Nová Ves	3–0	Obecný športový klub LÁB
OFK Dunajská Lužná	5–0	SDM Domino
OŠK Slovenský Grob	0–0 (4–2 p)	ŠK Báhoň
SFC Kalinkovo	2–3	PŠC Pezinok
KFC Kalná nad Hronom	3–2	ŠK Blava Jaslovské Bohunice

== Second round ==
64 matches in the second round were played from 13 August 2019 to 9 October 2019.

Team 1	Score	Team 2
AFC Nové Mesto nad Váhom	2–1	MFK Dubnica
OŠK Baník Stráňavy	0–1	MŠK Fomat Martin
FK Brezno	1–3	FK Dukla Banská Bystrica
ŠK Odeva Lipany	0–1	MŠK Žilina
OFK 1948 Veľký Lapáš	2–7	FC Nitra
Krasnohorske Podhradie	0–6	Zemplin Michalovce
OFK Baník Lehota pod Vtáčnikom	0–3	ViOn Zlaté Moravce
MFK Lokomotíva Zvolen	0–2	Sereď
Jednota Banova	2–3	Spartak Trnava
FK Selce	0–9	FK Pohronie
MSK Tisovec	1–8	AS Trenčín
Rohoznik	0–1	FK Senica
FK Podkonice	0–4	DAC Dunajská Streda
TJ Družstevník Malá Mača	0–6	Skalica
Namestovo	1–6	Liptovsky Mikulas
TJ Družstevník Zvončín	0–8	Petrzalka
Tatran VLM	0–4	FK Slavoj Trebisov
Lokomotiva DNV	1–1 (5–3 p)	Samorin
ŠK Javorník Makov	0–1	Puchov
PŠC Pezinok	1–1 (4–2 p)	Raca
TJ Štart Hrabušice	1–3	MFK Stará Ľubovňa
Agrifop Stakcin	3–0	Kamenica nad Cirochou
OŠK Trenčianske Stankovce	3–0	OK Častkovce
Kostolne Kracani	2–4	TJ Družstevník Radimov
TJ Partizán Domaniža	4–0	TJ KOVO Beluša
TJ Plevník-Drienové	1–6	OFK Malženice
FK Slovan Levice	3–1	FKM Nové Zámky
FC 98 Hajnáčka	3–4	MŠK Novohrad Lučenec
TJ Slovan Zemianske Kostoľany	1–2	ŠK Vegum Dolné Vestenice
TJ Tatran Uhrovec	1–1 (2–3 p)	TJ Družstevník Bešeňov
ŠK Šurany	1–2	FK Marcelová
TJ Veľké Lovce	4–1	OFK Velky Dur
ŠK Šoporňa	2–4	TJ Družstevník Jacovce
FK Bestrent Horná Krupá	2–1	FC Slovan Galanta
TJ Nafta Gbely	1–1 (3–5 p)	TJ Slavoj Boleráz
TJ Pokrok Stará Bystrica	1–3	TJ Spartak Vysoká nad Kysucou
FK Predmier	4–2	TJ Tatran Oravské Veselé
TJ Tatran Chlebnice	1–2	TJ Družstevník Oravská
FK Strečno	5–0	ŠK Tvrdošín
OTJ Hontianske Nemce	1–4	FK Rakytovce
OŠK Lieskovec	1–4	FK Šalková
OŠK Slovenský Grob	2–8	OFK Dunajská Lužná
OŠK Švošov	0–6	MFK Ruzomberok
OFK Veľké Ripňany	1–5	FC Pata
MFK Alekšince	3–1	OFK Solčany
OFK Tatran Kračúnovce	1–4	Partizan Bardejov'
FK Kolarovo	5–1	KFC Kalná nad Hronom
TJD Príbelce	1–2	KFC Komarno
FC Pivovar Veľký Šariš	1–4	FC Tatran Presov
FK Demjata	1–2	OŠFK Šarišské Michaľany
MFK Gelnica	0–2	MŠK Spišské Podhradie
MFK Spartak Medzev	1–2	Slávia TU Košice
TJ HORNÁD Ždaňa	1–1 (3–4 p)	TJ Mladosť Kalša
OŠK Rudňany	1–3	Železiarne Podbrezová
MŠK Tesla Stropkov	0–2	FK Poprad
SK Milenium Bardejovska Nova Ves	0–9	FC Košice
OFK Sečovská Polianka	1–5	MFK Vranov nad Topľou
FK Kechnec	4–4 (5–4 p)	MFK Ťahanovce
MŠK Spartak Medzilaborce	1–0	ŠK Strážske
FK Slovenské Ďarmoty	0–3	FTC Fiľakovo
MFK Kysucké Nové Mesto	0–0 (5–6 p)	TJ Tatran Krásno nad Kysucou
TJ Sokol Medzibrod	0–5	ŠK Prameň Kováčová
ŠK Belá	5–1	ŠK Závažná Poruba
TJ Družstevník Liptovská Štiavnica	0–4	Slovan Bratislava

== Third round ==
32 matches in the third round were played from 4 September 2019 to 12 October 2019.

Team 1	Score	Team 2
SK Vegum Dolné Vestenice	0–6	FC ViOn Zlaté Moravce
ŠK Prameň Kováčová	0–3	FK Slavoj Trebišov
TJ Veľké Lovce	0–7	FC Nitra
MŠK Fomat Martin	0–2	MFK Ružomberok
FK Predmier	1–2	MFK Tatran Liptovský Mikuláš
PSC Pezinok	0–6	FK Senica
Slávia TU Košice	1–1 (4–3 p)	MFK Zemplín Michalovce
FK Šalková	1–5	AS Trenčín
TJ Družstevník Jacovce	2–0	MFK Alekšince
TJ Družstevník Radimov	1–0	TJ Slavoj Boleráz
ŠK Belá	0–10	ŠKF Sereď
OFK Dunajská Lužná	7–0	Lokomotíva DNV
TJ Družstevník Bešeňov	2–0	FK Slovan Levice
FK Kolárovo	0–0 (4–5 p)	FK Marcelová
TJ Tatran Krásno nad Kysucou	0–4	Spartak Trnava
TJ Spartak Vysoká nad Kysucou	0–0 (9–8 p)	MŠK Púchov
Agrifop Stakčín	2–5	MŠK Spartak Medzilaborce
MFK Vranov nad Toplou	1–1 (4–5 p)	Partizán Bardejov
FK Kechnec	1–1 (1–3 p)	TJ Mladosť Kalša
OŠFK Šarišské Michaľany	0–2	FC Košice
1. FC Tatran Prešov	0–2	FK Poprad
MŠK Spišské Podhradie	1–0	FK Železiarne Podbrezová
FK Strečno	1–10	FK Dukla Banská Bystrica
FC Pata	1–2	FC Petržalka
FK Bestrent Horná Krupa	2–4	MFK Skalica
FTC Fiľakovo	0–0 (5–6 p)	DAC Dunajská Streda
OŠK Trenčianské Stankovce	0–2	AFC Nové Mesto nad Váhom
MŠK Novohrad Lučenec	0–1	KFC Komárno
MFK Stará Ľubovňa	2–3	MŠK Žilina
FK Rakytovce	1–5	FK Pohronie
TJ Partizán Domaniža	3–6	OFK Malženice
TJ Družstevník Oravská Poruba	0–7	Slovan Bratislava

== Fourth round ==
16 matches in the fourth round were played from 24 September 2019 to 16 November 2019.

Team 1	Score	Team 2
TJ Družstevník Jacovce	0–8	Spartak Trnava
KFC Komarno	0–2	FC Nitra
OFK Dunajská Lužná	0–3	Petrzalka
FC Košice	2–2 (1–4 p)	AS Trenčín
FK Slavoj Trebišov	1–2	FC ViOn Zlaté Moravce
MSK Spartak Medzilaborce	1–2	FK Dukla Banska Bystrica
TJ Družstevník Bešeňov	1–7	MFK Tatran Liptovský Mikuláš
TJ Spartak Vysoká nad Kysucou	0–4	ŠKF Sereď
TJ Mladost Kalsa	2–6	MFK Ružomberok
MSK Spisske Podhradie	0–3	Poprad
AFC Nove Mesto nad Vahom	0–4	MSK Zilina
FK Marcelová	0–3	Skalica
TJ Družstevník Radimov	0–2	DAC Dunajská Streda
OFK Malzenice	0–0 (1–4 p)	FK Senica
Slavia TU Košice	0–3	FK Pohronie
Partizan Bardejov	2–5	Slovan Bratislava

== Round of 16 ==
8 matches in the round of 16 were played from 30 October 2019 to 4 December 2019.

Team 1	Score	Team 2
AS Trenčín	4–0	Skalica
ŠKF Sereď	3–0	FC Petržalka
Poprad	3–0	FK Dukla Banská Bystrica
FC Nitra	3–0	MFK Tatran Liptovský Mikuláš
FK Senica	1–1 (3–4 p)	MFK Ružomberok
DAC Dunajská Streda	0–0 (4–3 p)	Spartak Trnava
FK Pohronie	0–1	FC ViOn Zlaté Moravce
Slovan Bratislava	2–0	MSK Zilina

== Quarter-finals ==
The draw for the quarter-finals took place on 12 December 2019. Matches were played on 4 March 2020.

4 March 2020	Sereď	0–2	Ružomberok	Zlaté Moravce
14:30 CET (UTC+01:00)		Report	Twardzik 11'; Regáli 24'	Stadium: Štadión FC ViOn; Attendance: 220; Referee: Peter Ziemba

4 March 2020	Trenčín	2–2 (5–6 p)	Slovan Bratislava	Žilina
16:30 CET (UTC+01:00)	Ligeon 24'; Kadák 62'	Report	Ratão 27', 66'	Stadium: Štadión pod Dubňom; Attendance: 380; Referee: Michal Očenáš
	Penalties
	Kadák (penalty scored); Depetris (penalty scored); El Mahdioui (penalty scored) van Kessel (penalty scored); Koolwijk (penalty missed); Šulek (penalty scored); Ligeon (penalty missed)		(penalty scored) de Kamps; (penalty scored) Ožbolt; (penalty scored) Ratão; (penalty scored) Lichý; (penalty missed) Henty; (penalty scored) De Marco; (penalty scored) Daniel

4 March 2020	Nitra	1–1 (4–5 p)	Zlaté Moravce	Nitra
17:30 CET (UTC+01:00)	Faško 18' (pen.)	Report	Ďubek 21' (pen.)	Stadium: Štadión pod Zoborom; Attendance: 816; Referee: Peter Kráľovič
	Penalties
	Podhorin (penalty scored); Magda (penalty scored); Gatarić (penalty scored); Faško (penalty missed); Ristovski (penalty scored)		(penalty scored) Ďubek; (penalty scored) Asanović; (penalty scored) Gustavo; (penalty scored) Švec; (penalty scored) Duga

4 March 2020	DAC Dunajská Streda	2–0	Poprad	Dunajská Streda
18:30 CET (UTC+01:00)	Ramirez 33'; Balić 57'	Report		Stadium: MOL Aréna; Attendance: 5,968; Referee: Boris Marhefka

== Semi-finals ==
The draw for the semi-finals took place on 26 May 2020.

=== First leg ===
16 June 2020	Slovan Bratislava	4–1	Zlaté Moravce	Bratislava
18:00 CEST (UTC+02:00)	Ožbolt 8', 28'; Medved 73'; Strelec 83'	Report	Cmiljanić 14'; Ďubek (yellow card) 85'; Brašeň (yellow card) 88'	Stadium: Tehelné pole Attendance: 252; Referee: Filip Glova

17 June 2020	DAC Dunajská Streda	1–1	Ružomberok	Dunajská Streda
18:00 CEST (UTC+02:00)	Schäfer 10'	Report	Brenkus 84'	Stadium: MOL Aréna; Attendance: 319; Referee: Ivan Kružliak

=== Second leg ===
23 June 2020	Zlaté Moravce	0–2 (1–6 agg.)	Slovan Bratislava	Zlaté Moravce
18:00 CEST (UTC+02:00)	Mészáros (yellow card) 14'; Asanović (yellow card) 55' (yellow-red card) 60'	Report	Henty (yellow card) 12'; Ratão (yellow card) 31'; Medved 45'; Weiss 61' (pen.); Apau (yellow card) 90+2'	Stadium: Štadión FC ViOn; Attendance: 332; Referee: Peter Kráľovič

24 June 2020	Ružomberok	3–0 (4–1 agg.)	DAC Dunajská Streda	Ružomberok
18:00 CEST (UTC+02:00)	Madleňák 21'; Gerec 80', 88'	Report		Stadium: Štadión pod Čebraťom; Attendance: 365; Referee: Michal Smolák

== Final ==
8 July 2020
18:00 (UTC+2)

Slovan Bratislava	1–0	Ružomberok
Ožbolt 48' (pen.)	Report

Tehelné pole, Bratislava
Attendance: 3,624
Referee: Filip Glova

== See also ==
- 2019–20 Slovak First Football League
