= 2019–20 3. Liga (Slovakia) =

3. Liga
- Season: 2019–20

The 2019–20 3. Liga was the 27th season of the third-tier football league of Slovakia since its establishment in 1993. The league is composed of 64 teams divided in four groups of 16 teams each. Teams are divided into four divisions: 3. liga Bratislava, 3. liga Západ (West), 3. liga Stred (Central), 3. liga Východ (Eastern), according to geographical separation.

== TIPOS III. liga Západ ==
=== Locations ===
Location of teams in the 2019–20 3. Liga Západ (West)

== TIPOS III. liga Stred ==
=== Locations ===
Location of teams in the 2019–20 3. Liga Stred (Central)

== TIPOS III. liga Východ ==
=== Relegated from 2. liga ===
- 1. FC Tatran Prešov
- ŠK Odeva Lipany

=== Promoted from 4. liga ===
- TJ Mladosť Kalša (4. liga Juh (South) winners)
- FK Poprad B (4. liga Sever (North) winners)

=== Locations ===
Location of teams in the 2019–20 3. Liga Východ (East)
