= Tomáš Ďubek =

Slovak footballer

Personal information
- Full name: Tomáš Ďubek
- Date of birth: 22 January 1987 (age 39)
- Place of birth: Zvolen, Czechoslovakia
- Height: 1.78 m (5 ft 10 in)
- Position: Midfielder

Youth career
- Lokomotíva Zvolen
- 2002–2004: Ružomberok

Senior career*
Years	Team	Apps	(Gls)
2004–2014	Ružomberok	233	(37)
2014–2015	Slovan Liberec	19	(1)
2015–2017	Ružomberok	60	(8)
2017	Zalaegerszeg	21	(2)
2018–2024	ViOn Zlaté Moravce	146	(30)
Total		479	(78)

International career
- Slovakia U21
2013	Slovakia	1	(0)

Managerial career
- 2024–2025: ViOn Zlaté Moravce B
- 2025–: Dukla Banská Bystrica (Assistant)
- * Club domestic league appearances and goals as of 16 May 2024

Tomáš Ďubek (born 22 January 1987) is a Slovak professional footballer who played last for ViOn Zlaté Moravce, currently assistant in Dukla Banská Bystrica.

== Career ==
Ďubek made his first appearance for Slovakia in 2013 match against Liechtenstein. In the end of the 2012–13 season, he won the award for the best player of Corgoň liga.

In April 2022, Ďubek became the most capped player in the history of the Slovak top division with 423 caps, surpassing previous record holder and former international Viktor Pečovský.

== Honours ==
=== MFK Ružomberok ===
- Corgoň Liga (1): 2005-06
- Slovak Cup (1): 2005-06

=== Individual ===
Corgoň Liga Player of the Season (1): 2012–13

- Slovak Super Liga Player of the Month: April 2022
