= 2020–21 MŠK Žilina season =

MŠK Žilina
2020–21 season
- Chairman: Jozef Antošík
- Manager: Pavol Staňo
- Stadium: Štadión pod Dubňom
- Fortuna liga: 4th
- Slovak Cup: Runners-up
- UEFA Europa League: First qualifying round

The 2020–21 season was MŠK Žilina's 113th season in existence and the club's 24th consecutive season in the top flight of Slovak football. In addition to the domestic league, Žilina participated in this season's edition of the Slovak Cup and the UEFA Europa League.

== Current squad ==
Note: Flags indicate national team as defined under FIFA eligibility rules; some limited exceptions apply. Players may hold more than one non-FIFA nationality.

No.	Pos.	Nation	Player
1	GK	SVK	Marek Teplan
2	DF	SVK	Dominik Javorček
5	DF	SVK	Adam Kopas
6	FW	SVK	Adrián Kaprálik
7	MF	SVK	Patrik Myslovič
8	FW	NGA	Taofiq Jibril
9	MF	SVK	Miroslav Gono
11	MF	ARM	Vahan Bichakhchyan
13	FW	NGA	Tenton Yenne
14	DF	POL	Jakub Piotr Kiwior
16	FW	SVK	Patrik Iľko
17	MF	SVK	Jakub Paur (captain)
18	MF	MKD	Enis Fazlagikj
19	FW	SVK	Timotej Jambor

No.	Pos.	Nation	Player
20	FW	SVK	Adam Goljan
21	MF	SVK	Ján Bernát
22	GK	SVK	Samuel Petráš
23	DF	SVK	Ján Minárik (vice-captain)
24	MF	SVK	Tibor Slebodník
25	DF	SVK	Tomáš Nemčík
27	DF	SVK	Branislav Sluka
28	DF	GHA	Benson Anang
29	FW	SVK	Dávid Ďuriš
30	GK	SVK	Ľubomír Belko
32	FW	SVK	Kristián Bari
66	MF	SVK	Matúš Rusnák
90	FW	POL	Dawid Kurminowski

== Competitions overview ==
Competition	First match	Last match	Starting round	Final position	Record							
Competition	First match	Last match	Starting round	Final position	Pld	W	D	L	GF	GA	GD	Win %
Fortuna liga	8 August 2020	28 May 2021	Matchday 1	Matchday 32	34	16	8	10	80	56	+24	47.06
Slovak Cup	16 September 2020	19 May 2021	2nd round	Final	7	4	3	0	20	7	+13	57.14
Europa League	27 August 2020	27 August 2020	1st qualifying round	1st qualifying round	1	0	0	1	1	3	−2	0.00
Total					42	20	11	11	101	66	+35	47.62

Source: Competitions

== Slovak First Football League ==
=== Regular stage ===
==== League table ====
Pos	Team	Pld	W	D	L	GF	GA	GD	Pts	Qualification
1	Slovan Bratislava	22	17	3	2	54	12	+42	54	Qualification for the championship group
2	DAC Dunajská Streda	22	13	5	4	48	28	+20	44	Qualification for the championship group
3	Žilina	22	11	4	7	49	33	+16	37	Qualification for the championship group
4	Spartak Trnava	22	11	2	9	32	29	+3	35	Qualification for the championship group
5	Zlaté Moravce	22	9	6	7	38	29	+9	33	Qualification for the championship group
6	Trenčín	22	7	7	8	30	38	−8	28	Qualification for the championship group

Source: Fortuna Liga (in Slovak)
Rules for classification: 1) Points; 2) Head-to-head points; 3) Head-to-head goal difference; 4) Head-to-head away goals scored; 5) Play-off.

==== Results by round ====
Round	1	2	3	4	5	6	7	8	9	10	11	12	13	14	15	16	17	18	19	20	21	22
Ground	A	H	A	A	H	A	H	A	H	H	A	H	A	H	H	A	H	A	H	A	A	H
Result	W	L	W	L	W	L	D	L	W	W	L	W	W	W	W	D	D	L	W	D	L	W
Position	3	4	4	4	3	4	4	6	4	3	3	3	3	3	3	3	3	3	3	3	4	3

Updated to match(es) played on 9 March 2021. Source: Futbalnet
A = Away; H = Home; W = Win; D = Draw; L = Loss

==== Matches ====
8 August 2020 1	FK Senica	0–4	MŠK Žilina	Senica
19:00 CEST (UTC+02:00)		Report	59' Ďuriš; 64' Paur; 79' Bichakhchyan; 83' Bichakhchyan	Stadium: OMS ARENA Senica; Attendance: 1238; Referee: Michal Smolák

11 August 2020 2	MŠK Žilina	1–2	FC Nitra	Žilina
19:00 CEST (UTC+02:00)	45' Bichakhchyan	Report	56' Faško; 66'Faško	Stadium: Štadión pod Dubňom; Attendance: 1705; Referee: Filip Glova

15 August 2020 3	AS Trenčín	2–4	MŠK Žilina	Žilina
CEST (UTC+02:00)	45' (pen.) Čataković; 75' Bukari	Report	7' Paur; 51' Iľko; 85' Kaprálik; 90' (pen.) Bichakhchyan	Stadium: Štadión pod Dubňom; Attendance: 1210; Referee: Erik Gemzický

22 August 2020 4	FK Pohronie	2–1	MŠK Žilina	Žiar nad Hronom
19:00 CEST (UTC+02:00)	36' Bimenyimana; 61' Fadera	Report	53' Iľko	Stadium: Mestský štadión Attendance: 1150; Referee: Erik Gemzický

30 August 2020 5	MŠK Žilina	6–2	MFK Zemplín Michalovce	Žilina
19:00 CEST (UTC+02:00)	17' (pen.), 73' Kurminowski; 40' Ďuriš; 49' Mysloviš; 61' Kiwior; 68' Bichakhchyan	Report	56' Žofčák; 65' Begala	Stadium: Štadión pod Dubňom; Attendance: 1192; Referee: Martin Dohál

12 September 2020 6	ŠKF Sereď	3–2	MŠK Žilina	Žiar nad Hronom
19:00 CEST (UTC+02:00)	28' Pankaričan; 42', 55' Špehar	Report	77' Kristián Vallo; 90' Kurminowski	Stadium: Mestský štadión Attendance: 284; Referee: Boris Marhefka

19 September 2020 7	MŠK Žilina	2–2	Slovan Bratislava	Žilina
19:00 CEST (UTC+02:00)	16' Kurminowski; 30' (o.g.) Bajrić	Report	13' Medveděv; 39' Bajrić	Stadium: Štadión pod Dubňom; Attendance: 972; Referee: Boris Marhefka

26 September 2020 8	FC ViOn Zlaté Moravce	4–0	MŠK Žilina	Žiar nad Hronom
19:00 CEST (UTC+02:00)	7' Balaj; 35' (pen.) Ďubek; 42' Hrnčár; 57' Kyziridis	Report		Stadium: Mestský štadión Attendance: 893; Referee: Dušan Sedlák

3 October 2020 9	MŠK Žilina	4–1	DAC Dunajská Streda	Žilina
19:00 CEST (UTC+02:00)	10' Iľko; 23' Kurminowski; 34' Bichakhchyan; 70' (o.g.) Kružliak	Report	33' Balić	Stadium: Štadión pod Dubňom; Attendance: 0 Referee: Peter Kráľovič

17 October 2020 10	MŠK Žilina	2–1	Spartak Trnava	Žilina
17:00 CEST (UTC+02:00)	5' Bichakhchyan; 71' Gamboš	Report	50' Mikovič	Stadium: Štadión pod Dubňom; Attendance: 0 Referee: Filip Glova

24 October 2020 11	MFK Ružomberok	2–1	MŠK Žilina	Ružomberok
17:00 CEST (UTC+02:00)	82' Kochan; 90' Regáli	Report	20' Kurminowski	Stadium: Štadión pod Čebraťom; Attendance: 0 Referee: Filip Glova

31 October 2020 12	MŠK Žilina	3–1	FK Senica	Žilina
17:00 CET (UTC+01:00)	25' Kurminowski; 41' (o.g.) Asanović; 63' (pen.) Bichakhchyan	Report	35' (o.g.) Vallo	Stadium: Štadión pod Dubňom; Attendance: 0 Referee: Ladislav Prešinský

7 November 2020 13	FC Nitra	0–3	MŠK Žilina	Nitra
17:00 CET (UTC+01:00)		Report	56' Bichakhchyan; 90' Kurminowski; 90+3' Paur	Stadium: Štadión pod Zoborom; Attendance: 0 Referee: Adam Somoláni

21 November 2020 14	MŠK Žilina	2–0	AS Trenčín	Žilina
14:00 CET (UTC+01:00)	15' Bernát; 59' Kurminowski	Report		Stadium: Štadión pod Dubňom; Attendance: 0 Referee: Dušan Sedlák

28 November 2020 15	MŠK Žilina	2–1	FK Pohronie	Žilina
14:00 CET (UTC+01:00)	43' Bernát; 76' Ďuriš	Report	89' Blahut	Stadium: Štadión pod Dubňom; Attendance: 0 Referee: Ladislav Prešinský

5 December 2020 16	MFK Zemplín Michalovce	1–1	MŠK Žilina	Michalovce
14:00 CET (UTC+01:00)	85' Taiwo	Report	50' Bernát	Stadium: Mestský futbalový štadión Attendance: 0 Referee: Peter Kráľovič

12 December 2020 17	MŠK Žilina	0–0	ŠKF Sereď	Žilina
14:00 CET (UTC+01:00)		Report		Stadium: Štadión pod Dubňom; Attendance: 0 Referee: Marek Mastiš

16 December 2020 18	Slovan Bratislava	3–2	MŠK Žilina	Bratislava
18:15 CET (UTC+01:00)	Bernát 38'; Fazlagikj 85'	Report	Daniel 48', 65'; Ratão 90+4'	Stadium: Tehelné pole Attendance: 0 Referee: Erik Gemzický

13 February 2021 19	MŠK Žilina	4–1	FC ViOn Zlaté Moravce	Žilina
14:00 CET (UTC+01:00)	Jibril 42'; Moško 66' (o.g.); Iľko 69'; Slebodník 83'	Report	Kovaľ 62'	Stadium: Štadión pod Dubňom; Attendance: 0 Referee: Martin Dohál

21 February 2021 20	DAC Dunajská Streda	1–1	MŠK Žilina	Dunajská Streda
15:00 CET (UTC+01:00)	Nicolaescu 10'	Report	Jibril 47'	Stadium: MOL Aréna; Attendance: 0 Referee: Michal Smolák

27 February 2021 21	FC Spartak Trnava	2–1	MŠK Žilina	Trnava
17:00 CET (UTC+01:00)	Yusuf 15', 30'; Koštrna (red card) 58'	Report	Javorček 40'	Stadium: Anton Malatinský Stadium; Attendance: 0 Referee: Boris Marhefka

6 March 2021 22	MŠK Žilina	3–2	MFK Ružomberok	Žilina
14:00 CET (UTC+01:00)	Rusnák 6'; Myslovič 11'; Ďuriš 43'	Report	Kružliak 12'; Boďa 90' (pen.)	Stadium: Štadión pod Dubňom; Attendance: 0 Referee: Peter Ziemba

=== Championship group ===
==== League table ====
Pos	Team	Pld	W	D	L	GF	GA	GD	Pts	Qualification	SLO	DAC	TRN	ŽIL	ZLM	TRE
1	Slovan Bratislava (C)	32	22	5	5	78	28	+50	71	Qualification for the Champions League first qualifying round	—	0–1	1–2	2–2	4–1	2–1
2	DAC Dunajská Streda	32	19	8	5	66	38	+28	65	Qualification for the Europa Conference League second qualifying round	2–2	—	2–0	2–1	2–0	2–0
3	Spartak Trnava	32	17	4	11	48	37	+11	55	Qualification for the Europa Conference League first qualifying round	3–0	3–2	—	1–1	3–0	2–0
4	Žilina	32	15	7	10	73	52	+21	52	Qualification for the Europa Conference League play-offs	2–3	3–3	2–1	—	5–1	5–3
5	Zlaté Moravce	32	11	7	14	42	51	−9	40	Qualification for the Europa Conference League play-offs	0–4	0–1	0–0	1–0	—	1–0
6	Trenčín	32	8	8	16	42	61	−19	32	Qualification for the Europa Conference League play-offs	2–6	1–1	0–1	2–3	3–0	—

Source: Fortuna Liga (in Slovak)
Rules for classification: 1) Points; 2) Head-to-head points; 3) Head-to-head goal difference; 4) Head-to-head away goals scored; 5) Play-off.
(C) Champions

==== Results by round ====
Round	1	2	3	4	5	6	7	8	9	10
Ground	H	A	H	A	A	H	A	H	A	H
Result	W	D	D	W	L	L	L	W	D	W
Position	3	3	3	3	4	4	4	4	4	4

Source: Futbalnet
A = Away; H = Home; W = Win; D = Draw; L = Loss; P = Postponed

==== Matches ====
13 March 2021 1	MŠK Žilina	2–1	FC Spartak Trnava	Žilina
18:30 CET (UTC+01:00)	Jibril 88'; Twardzik 90+6' (o.g.)	Report	Cabral 49'; Jendrek (yellow card) (yellow-red card) 90+3'	Stadium: Štadión pod Dubňom; Attendance: 0 Referee: Adam Somoláni

20 March 2021 2	ŠK Slovan Bratislava	2–2	MŠK Žilina	Bratislava
17:30	Moha 49' (pen.); Ratão 90+4' (pen.)	Report	Ďuriš 32'; Kurminowski 63' (pen.)	Stadium: Tehelné pole Attendance: 0

4 April 2021 3	MŠK Žilina	3–3	FC DAC 1904 Dunajská Streda	Žilina
16:00	Ďuriš 30', 41'; Kurminowski 35' (pen.)	Report	Ramírez 22', 45+1'; Balić 33'	Stadium: Štadión pod Dubňom; Attendance: 0 Referee: Michal Smolák

10 April 2021 4	AS Trenčín	2–3	MŠK Žilina	Trenčín
15:30	Čataković 45' (pen.); Ghali 79'	Report	Lavrinčík 6' (o.g.); Kurminowski 21'; Kaprálik 59'	Stadium: Štadión na Sihoti; Attendance: 0 Referee: Boris Marhefka

18 April 2021 5	FC ViOn Zlaté Moravce	1–0	MŠK Žilina	Zlaté Moravce
16:00	Balaj 89'	Report		Stadium: Štadión FC ViOn; Attendance: 0 Referee: Peter Kráľovič

25 April 2021 6	MŠK Žilina	2–3	ŠK Slovan Bratislava	Žilina
16:00 CEST (UTC+02:00)	Minárik 43'; Bernát 54'	Report	Anang 19' (o.g.); Ratão 38'; Weiss 86' (pen.)	Stadium: Štadión pod Dubňom; Attendance: 0

1 May 2021 7	FC DAC 1904 Dunajská Streda	2–1	MŠK Žilina	Dunajská Streda
14:30 CEST (UTC+02:00)	Davis 16' (pen.); Taiwo 68'	Report	Paur 30'	Stadium: MOL Aréna; Attendance: 42; Referee: Michal Smolák

8 May 2021 8	MŠK Žilina	5–3	AS Trenčín	Žilina
17:00 CEST (UTC+02:00)	Ďuriš 5'; Kurminowski 49', 61'; Kiwior 69'; Goljan 76'	Report	Aschraf El Mahdioui (yellow card) 24' (yellow-red card) 56'; Ikoba 32' (pen.); Čataković 80', 88'	Stadium: Štadión pod Dubňom; Attendance: 0 Referee: Bálint Kišš

15 May 2021 9	FC Spartak Trnava	1–1	MŠK Žilina	Trnava
18:00 CEST (UTC+02:00)	Yusuf 44'	Report	Kurminowski 78' (pen.)	Stadium: Štadión Antona Malatinského; Referee: Ivan Kružliak

22 May 2021 10	MŠK Žilina	5–1	FC ViOn Zlaté Moravce	Žilina
18:00 CEST (UTC+02:00)	Kurminowski 8', 32', 36' (pen.), 61' (pen.); Lambor 82'	Report	Švec 71'	Stadium: Štadión pod Dubňom; Referee: Bálint Kišš

=== Europa Conference League play-offs ===
==== Semi-final ====
25 May 2021	MŠK Žilina	4–2	ŠKF Sereď	Žilina
19:00 CEST (UTC+02:00)	Kurminowski 9'; Rusnák 32'; Bernát 38'; Slebodník 87'	Report	Bušnja 60'; Jureškin 83'	Stadium: Štadión pod Dubňom; Attendance: 164; Referee: Michal Smolák

==== Final ====
28 May 2021	MŠK Žilina	3−2 (a.e.t.)	FC ViOn Zlaté Moravce	Žilina
19:00	Bichakhchyan 43' (pen.), 45+8' (pen.); Jibril 101'	Report	Balaj 13'; Hrnčár 23'	Stadium: Štadión pod Dubňom; Attendance: 340; Referee: Filip Glova

== Slovak Cup ==
16 September 2020 2nd round	MŠK Námestovo (3)	0–7	MŠK Žilina	Námestovo
16:00 CEST (UTC+02:00)		Report	5', 29', 54' Kurminowski; 39', 51' Bernát; 41' Ďuriš; 82' Rusnák	Attendance: 950; Referee: Pavel Ochotnický

30 September 2020 3rd round	TJ Tatran Oravské Veselé (3)	1–1 (3–4 p)	MŠK Žilina	Oravské Veselé
15:30 CEST (UTC+02:00)	6' Jurky	Report	2' Bari	Referee: Erik Gemzický
	Penalties
	Žilák (penalty missed); Kmeť (penalty scored); Jurky (penalty scored); Struhár (penalty scored); Feriančik (penalty missed)		(penalty scored) Díaz; (penalty scored) Kaprálik; (penalty scored) Javorček; (penalty missed) Nemčík; (penalty scored) Myslovič

4th round	ŠK Belá (5)	Cancelled (Note: Due the COVID-19 pandemic organizers make changes in a format of the 2020–21 Slovak Cup. MŠK Žilina promote to the Round of 16.)	MŠK Žilina	Belá

7 April 2021 Round of 16	MŠK Žilina	1–1 (6–5 p)	FK Železiarne Podbrezová (2)	Topoľčany
16:00 CEST (UTC+02:00)	Iľko 26'	Report	Breznanik 87'
	Penalties
	Myslovič (penalty scored); Bernát (penalty missed); Kopas (penalty missed); Sluka (penalty scored); Fazlagikj (penalty scored); Jibril (penalty missed); Javorček (penalty missed); Ďuriš (penalty scored); Nemčík (penalty scored); Rusnák (penalty scored)		Bakaľa (penalty missed); Ďatko (penalty scored); Paraj (penalty scored); Pajer (penalty missed); Chvátal (penalty scored); Grešák (penalty missed); Skiba (penalty missed); Breznaník (penalty scored); Gerebenits (penalty scored); Urgela (penalty missed)

13 April 2021 Quarter-final	FC ViOn Zlaté Moravce (1)	0–2	MŠK Žilina	Zlaté Moravce
15:30 CEST (UTC+02:00)		Report	Rusnák 33'; Paur 87'	Stadium: Štadión FC ViOn; Attendance: 0 Referee: Michal Smolák

=== Semi-finals ===
28 April 2021 First leg	FC Košice (2)	2–4	MŠK Žilina	Košice
15:30 CEST (UTC+02:00)	Pačinda 47', 86'	Report	Slebodník 28'; Kaprálik 41', 65'; Bernát 87'	Stadium: Štadión Lokomotívy; Attendance: 0 Referee: Adam Somoláni

4 May 2021 Second leg	MŠK Žilina	4–1 (8–3 agg.)	FC Košice	Žilina
15:30 CEST (UTC+02:00)	Ďuriš 1'; Bichakhchyan 12' (pen.); Myslovič 38'; Minárik 90'	Report	Pačinda 17'	Stadium: Štadión pod Dubňom; Referee: Martin Dohál

=== Final ===
19 May 2021	MŠK Žilina	1–2 (a.e.t.)	ŠK Slovan Bratislava	Bratislava
18:00 (UTC+2)	Kiwior 30'	Report	Henty 61'; Weiss 105' (pen.)	Stadium: Tehelné pole Referee: Peter Kráľovič

== UEFA Europa League ==
=== First qualifying round ===
27 August 2020 Q1	The New Saints (Wales)	3–1 (a.e.t.)	(Slovakia) MŠK Žilina	Park Hall, Oswestry
19:30 (18:30 BST)	Robles 56'; Smith 100'; Cieślewicz 108' (pen.)	Report	Myslovič 77'	Attendance: 0 Referee: Manfredas Lukjančukas (Lithuania)
