= 2021–22 MŠK Žilina season =

MŠK Žilina
2020–21 season
- Chairman: Jozef Antošík
- Manager: Pavol Staňo
- Stadium: Štadión pod Dubňom
- Fortuna liga: 3rd
- Slovak Cup: 2nd round
- Europa Conference League: Play-off round

The 2021–22 season is MŠK Žilina's 114th season in existence and the club's 25th consecutive season in the top flight of Slovak football. In addition to the domestic league, Žilina participated in this season's edition of the Slovak Cup and the UEFA Europa Conference League.

== Current squad ==
As of 4 August 2021
Note: Flags indicate national team as defined under FIFA eligibility rules; some limited exceptions apply. Players may hold more than one non-FIFA nationality.

No.	Pos.	Nation	Player
1	GK	SVK	Marek Teplan
2	DF	SVK	Dominik Javorček
3	DF	SVK	Patrik Leitner
6	MF	SVK	Miroslav Gono
7	MF	SVK	Patrik Myslovič
8	FW	NGR	Taofiq Jibril
10	FW	SVK	Adrián Kaprálik
11	MF	ARM	Vahan Bichakhchyan
14	DF	POL	Jakub Kiwior
16	FW	SVK	Patrik Iľko
17	MF	SVK	Jakub Paur (captain)
18	MF	MKD	Enis Fazlagikj
19	FW	SVK	Timotej Jambor
20	FW	SVK	Adam Goljan

No.	Pos.	Nation	Player
22	GK	SVK	Samuel Petráš
23	DF	SVK	Ján Minárik (vice-captain)
24	MF	SVK	Tibor Slebodník
25	DF	SVK	Tomáš Nemčík
27	DF	SVK	Branislav Sluka
28	DF	GHA	Benson Anang
29	FW	SVK	Dávid Ďuriš
30	GK	SVK	Ľubomír Belko
33	DF	SVK	Adam Kopas
39	DF	SVK	Marián Tandara
40	DF	SVK	Samuel Suľa
43	MF	SVK	Filip Mráz
44	DF	SVK	Richard Nagy
66	MF	SVK	Matúš Rusnák

For recent transfers, see List of Slovak football transfers summer 2021.

=== Out on loan ===
Note: Flags indicate national team as defined under FIFA eligibility rules; some limited exceptions apply. Players may hold more than one non-FIFA nationality.

No.	Pos.	Nation	Player
—	FW	SVK	Roland Gerebenits (at (Slovakia) Železiarne Podbrezová until 30 June 2021)
—	DF	SVK	Bernard Petrák (at (Slovakia) Pohronie until 30 June 2021)
—	DF	SVK	Matej Moško (at (Slovakia) ViOn Zlaté Moravce until 30 June 2021)

No.	Pos.	Nation	Player
—	DF	SVK	Kristián Vallo (at (Poland) Wisła Płock until 30 June 2021)
—	DF	SVK	Vladimír Majdan (at (Slovakia) Senica until 30 June 2022)
—	MF	SVK	Ján Bernát (at (Belgium) Westerlo until 30 June 2022)

=== Reserve team ===
MŠK Žilina B are the reserve team of MŠK Žilina. They currently play in the second-level football league in Slovakia 2. Liga.

==== Squad ====
Head coach: (Slovakia) Vladimír Veselý

Assistant coach: (Slovakia) Filip Kňazovič

Assistant coach: (Slovakia) Viktor Pečovský

Goalkeeper coach: (Slovakia) Dušan Molčan

As of 4 August 2021 Note: Flags indicate national team as defined under FIFA eligibility rules; some limited exceptions apply. Players may hold more than one non-FIFA nationality.

No.	Pos.	Nation	Player
—	DF	SVK	Kristián Bari
—	DF	SVK	Matúš Capko
—	DF	SVK	Samuel Kopásek
—	DF	SVK	Martin Matejčík
—	DF	GHA	Richmond Owusu
—	MF	SVK	Martin Gomola
—	MF	SVK	Adrián Mojžiš

No.	Pos.	Nation	Player
—	MF	SVK	Viktor Pečovský
—	MF	SVK	Mario Sauer
—	FW	SVK	Vladislav Cicek
—	FW	SVK	Roland Gerebenits
—	FW	SVK	Vladimír Trabalík
—	FW	SVK	Tomáš Vaľovčin
—	FW	NGR	Tenton Yenne

== Competitions overview ==
Competition	First match	Last match	Starting round	Record							
Competition	First match	Last match	Starting round	Pld	W	D	L	GF	GA	GD	Win %
Slovak First Football League	25 July 2021		Matchday 1	4	3	0	1	8	3	+5	75.00
Slovak Cup	25 August 2021			0	0	0	0	0	0	+0	—
Europa Conference League	8 July 2021		First qualifying round	6	4	1	1	17	6	+11	66.67
Total				10	7	1	2	25	9	+16	70.00

Last updated: 16 August 2021
Source: Soccerway

== Slovak First Football League ==
=== League table ===
Pos	Team	Pld	W	D	L	GF	GA	GD	Pts	Qualification
3	Ružomberok	22	11	8	3	39	17	+22	41	Qualification for the championship group
4	DAC Dunajská Streda	22	10	6	6	28	23	+5	36	Qualification for the championship group
5	Sereď	22	9	5	8	28	28	0	32	Qualification for the championship group
6	Žilina	22	8	6	8	34	33	+1	30	Qualification for the championship group
7	Senica	22	7	6	9	21	32	−11	27	Qualification for the relegation group
8	Trenčín	22	6	7	9	32	33	−1	25	Qualification for the relegation group
9	Zemplín Michalovce	22	7	2	13	20	31	−11	23	Qualification for the relegation group

Source: Niké liga (in Slovak)
Rules for classification: 1) Points; 2) Head-to-head points; 3) Head-to-head goal difference; 4) Head-to-head away goals scored; 5) Play-off.

=== Results by round ===
Round	1	2	3	4	5
Ground	H	A	H	A	H
Result	W	W	W	L	
Position	4	2	1	3	

A = Away; H = Home; W = Win; D = Draw; L = Loss

=== Matches ===
25 July 2021 1	MŠK Žilina	3–0	ŠKF Sereď	Žilina
18:00 CEST (UTC+02:00)				Stadium: Štadión pod Dubňom

1 August 2021 2	FC ViOn Zlaté Moravce	0–1	MŠK Žilina	Zlaté Moravce
18:00 CEST (UTC+02:00)				Stadium: Štadión FC ViOn

8 August 2021 3	MŠK Žilina	3–1	FK Pohronie	Žilina
18:00 CEST (UTC+02:00)				Stadium: Štadión pod Dubňom

15 August 2021 4	MFK Tatran Liptovský Mikuláš	2–1	MŠK Žilina	Poprad
20:00 CEST (UTC+02:00)				Stadium: NTC Poprad

22 August 2021 5	MŠK Žilina	v	FK Senica	Žilina
18:00 CEST (UTC+02:00)				Stadium: Štadión pod Dubňom

== Slovak Cup ==
25 August 2021 Second round	TJ Jednota Bánova	v	Žilina	Bánová
17:00

== UEFA Europa Conference League ==
=== First qualifying round ===
8 July 2021	MŠK Žilina (Slovakia)	5–1	(Georgia (country)) FC Dila Gori	Štadión pod Dubňom, Žilina
18:45	Anang 6'; Ďuriš 25', 64'; Bichakhchyan 56' (pen.); Jibril 82'	Report	Nemsadze 84'	Attendance: 500; Referee: Philip Farrugia (Malta)

15 July 2021	FC Dila Gori (Georgia (country))	2–1 (3–6 agg.)	(Slovakia) MŠK Žilina	Tengiz Burjanadze Stadium, Gori
19:00 (21:00 GET)	Camara 58'; Wanderson 70'	Report	Bichakhchyan 45+4' (pen.)	Attendance: 1,835; Referee: Milos Milanovic (Serbia)

=== Second qualifying round ===
22 July 2021	Apollon Limassol (Cyprus)	1–3	(Slovakia) MŠK Žilina	AEK Arena, Larnaca (Note: Apollon Limassol will play their home match at AEK Arena, Larnaca, instead of their regular stadium Tsirion Stadium, Limassol, as another match is taking place at the same day.)
19:00 (20:00 EEST)	Jradi 25'	Report	Ďuriš 5'; Bernát 45+1', 52' (pen.)	Attendance: 1,805; Referee: Barbeno Luca (San Marino)

29 July 2021	MŠK Žilina (Slovakia)	2–2 (5–3 agg.)	(Cyprus) Apollon Limassol	Štadión pod Dubňom, Žilina
18:45	Bernát 27'; Jibril 79'	Report	Coll 13'; Jradi 51'	Attendance: 1,726; Referee: Alexandre Boucaut (Belgium)

=== Third qualifying round ===
5 August 2021	FC Tobol (Kazakhstan)	0–1	(Slovakia) MŠK Žilina	Astana Arena, Nur-Sultan (Note: Tobol played their third qualifying round home match at Astana Arena, Nur-Sultan, instead of their regular stadium Kostanay Central Stadium, Kostanay, which did not meet UEFA requirements.)
18:00 (22:00 ALMT)		Report	Gono 27'	Attendance: 0 (Note: Behind closed doors); Referee: Sergei Ivanov (Russia)

12 August 2021	MŠK Žilina (Slovakia)	5–0 (6–0 agg.)	(Kazakhstan) FC Tobol	Štadión pod Dubňom, Žilina
18:45	Ďuriš 14'; Rusnák 41'; Bichakhchyan 64', 90+1'; Slebodník 81'	Report		Attendance: 2,227; Referee: John Beaton (Scotland)

=== Play-off round ===
19 August 2021	FK Jablonec (Czech Republic)	v	(Slovakia) MŠK Žilina	Stadion Střelnice, Jablonec nad Nisou
20:00		Report		Referee: Jakob Kehlet (Denmark)

26 August 2021	MŠK Žilina (Slovakia)	v	(Czech Republic) FK Jablonec	Štadión pod Dubňom, Žilina
18:00		Report		Referee: Kristo Tohver (Estonia)
