= 2020–21 Slovak Cup =

Slovnaft Cup

Tournament details
- Country: Slovakia
- Teams: 229

Final positions
- Champions: Slovan Bratislava
- Runners-up: MŠK Žilina

The 2020–21 Slovak Cup was the 52nd edition of the competition. The tournament began on 25 July 2020 and the final was played on 19 May 2021.

Slovan Bratislava were the defending champions, defeating Ružomberok in the 2020 final.

Slovan won a second consecutive title, defeating Žilina in the final.

The winner of the Slovak Cup earned automatic qualification for the second qualifying round in UEFA Europa Conference League. As Slovan had already qualified for the 2021–22 UEFA Champions League as league champion, the spot was decided by the Europa Conference League play-offs, which was eventually won by Žilina.

== Format ==
The Cup was played as a knockout tournament contested by 229 teams - one more than the previous edition. Teams (excluding 'B' teams) from the top five levels played along with two winners of regional cups. All ties are decided on the day with penalty shoot-outs used to decide drawn matches. All rounds are played as one-off matches except the semi-finals which are played over two legs.

== Prize money ==
In this season, the fixed amount of prize money paid to the clubs is as follows:

- Winning the final: €50,000
- Losing finalist: €20,000
- Semi-finals: €5,000

The most successful club from the regional football associations will receive a financial reward of €3,000 if they end before semifinal. Teams that participate in the 1st and 2nd round will receive match balls (for home club five and for away club three).

== First round ==
101 matches in the first round were played from July 25, 2020, to August 5, 2020. The first round is regional, which means that, only teams from one region meet each other. Matches of the first round drew the divisional football associations. If the score is still level after ninety minutes, a team advancing to next round will be reached by penalty shoutout.

Team 1	Score	Team 2
FC Lokomotíva Košice	3–0	FK Krásnohorské Podhradie
MFK Bytča	1–1 (4–5 p)	FK Slávia Staškov
FK Strečno	0–3	OŠK Svošov
TJ Višňové	1–1 (4–2 p)	OŠK Baník Stráňavy
ŠK Čierne	0–3	ŠK Javorník Makov
TJ Spartak Vysoká nad Kysucou	1–1 (5–6 p)	TJ Jednota Bánová
OFK Kotešová	1–2	ŠK Gbeľany
TJ Pokrok Stará Bystrica	0–3	Oravan Oravská Jasenica
ŠK Belá	5–1	TJ Družstevník Oravská Poruba
Attack Vrútky	1–7	MŠK Fomat Martin
FK Nižná	1–1 (3–1 p)	TJ Družstevník Dlhá nad Oravou
OŠK Bešeňová	4–2	FK Rakytovce
OŠK Likavka	1–5	MFK Dolný Kubín
TJ Slovan Magura Vavrečka	1–1 (9–10 p)	ŠK Tvrdošín
TJ Tatran Chlebnice	0–3	TJ Tatran Oravské Veselé
FK Sitno Banská Štiavnica	2–2 (3–4 p)	TJ Tatran VLM Pliešovce
FK Selce	0–2	MFK Detva
TJ ŠK Sokol Jakub	4–2	TJ Sokol Medzibrod
MFK Strojár Krupina	1–4	FK Podkonice
ŠK Dynamo Diviaky	1–3	ŠK Prameň Kováčová
TJ Jednota Málinec	0–0 (6–5 p)	TJ Baník Kalinovo
ŠK Hrochoť	3–2	MFK Spartak Hriňová
OFK Olováry	1–0	MŠK Novohrad Lučenec
MFK Baník Veľký Krtíš	2–1	FTC Fiľakovo
TJ Sklotatran Poltár	2–3	MFK Zvolen
FC Slovan Modra	0–0 (5–4 p)	ŠK Báhoň
MFK Gelnica	0–0 (3–1 p)	MFK Spartak Medzev
TJ Busov Gaboltov	2–4	FK Gerlachov
FK Brezno	2–0	MŠK Tisovec
TJ Štart Hrabušice	0–5	OŠK Rudňany
MŠK Spartak Medzilaborce	0–2	MŠK Tesla Stropkov
OFK Sečovská Polianka	1–3	ŠK Strážske
OŠK Budkovce	1–2	OŠK Pavlovce nad Uhom
ŠK Sačurov	0–4	FK Sobrance – Sobranecko
OFK Hencovce	1–6	MFK Vranov nad Topľou
OŠK Radzovce	0–3	FC 98 Hajnáčka
FK Jesenské	0–4	MŠK Rimavská Sobota
1. FK Buzitka	1–3	TJD Príbelce
TJ Slovan Skalité	0–2	MŠK Kysucké Nové Mesto
1. MFK Kežmarok	9–2	1. ŠK Tatran Spišské Vlachy
OFK Vikartovce	4–6	FK Svit
TJ Dunajec Spišská Stará Ves	1–3	MŠK Slavoj Spišská Belá
TJ Tatran Ľubica	3–3 (3–4 p)	FK Veľká Lomnica
TJ Dvorníky – Včeláre	1–4	ŠK Odeva Lipany
ŠK Kmeťovo	2–3	TJ Veľké Lovce
MFK Baník Handlová	0–0 (4–3 p)	FC Baník Prievidza
TJ Družstevník Jacovce	3–1	MFC Spartak Bánovce nad Bebravou
NŠK 1922 Bratislava	1–0	SDM Domino
TJ Plevník - Drienové	1–2	MŠK Považská Bystrica
TJ Družstevník Zvončín	1–1 (5–4 p)	TJ Slavoj Boleráz
FK Bestrent Horná Krupá	3–0	OFK Trebatice
FC Družstevník Rybky	0–6	OFK Malženice
TJ Družstevník Bešeňov	1–1 (5–3 p)	TJ Družstevník Veľké Ludince
OFK Baník Lehota pod Vtáčnikom	5–1	FK Junior Kanianka
TJ Slovan Zemianske Kostoľany	1–3	ŠK VEGUM Dolné Vestenice
OFK Solčany	0–2	OFL Tovarníky
FK Voderady	0–11	ŠK Šoporňa
FC Pata	4–2	FC Slovan Hlohovec
OFK Veľké Ripňany	0–1	PFK Piešťany
TJ Družstevník Trstice	1–2	FC Slovan Galanta
TJ Iskra - Horné Orešany	3–6	ŠK Blava 1928
FK Melčice - Lieskové	2–0	OŠK Trenčianske Stankovce
MFK Vrbové	0–0 (3–4 p)	AFC Nové Mesto nad Váhom
FC Komjatice	1–5	ŠK Šurany
OŠK Lipová	0–4	TJ Imeľ–1
Jednota Sokol Chocholná-Velčice	1–1 (6–5 p)	OK Častkovce
TJ Lokomotíva Bánov	0–3	MŠK Hurbanovo
ŠK Veľké Zálužie	4–1	OFK Kovarce
TJ Kostolné Kračany	3–0	MŠK - Thermál Veľký Meder
FK Kolárovo	3–1	FKM Nové Zámky
FC Mosap Klasov	2–3	ŠK Nevidzany
TJ Družstevník Ivanka pri Nitre	0–7	OFK 1948 Veľký Lapáš
TJ Vápeč Horná Poruba	0–3	TJ Spartak Kvašov
TJ Považan Pruské	2–0	TJ Partizán Prečín
TJ Slovan Brvnište	1–6	FK Beluša
OFK Mokrý Háj	2–2 (2–4 p)	TH Družstevník Radimov
TJ Nafta Gbely	3–0	TJ Iskra Holíč
TJ Družstevník Malá Mača	1–1 (4–5 p)	Spartak Myjava
FK Danubia Veľký Biel	0–4	FK Slovan Most pri Bratislave
ŠK Vrakuňa Bratislava	1–2	MFK Rusovce
FK Mariathal Bratislava	1–1 (2–4 p)	ŠK Závod
OFK Vysoká pri Morave	0–2	FC Rohožník
MFK Slovan Záhorská Bystrica	0–4	Lokomotíva Devínska Nová Ves
OŠK Láb	1–1 (3–5 p)	FC Malacky
ŠK Svätý Jur	2–2 (1–4 p)	PŠC Pezinok
OŠK Slovenský Grob	0–8	TJ Rovinka
FK Karpaty Limbach	0–2	SFC Kalinkovo
TJ Slovan Viničné	2–5	FK Rača Bratislava
ŠK Sásová	1–1 (4–3 p)	FK Šalková
TJ Slavoj Kráľovský Chlmec	0–3	TJ Mladosť Kalša
OFK Slovan Poproč	0–3	FK Čaňa
FK Košická Nová Vec	2–1	FK Kechnec
MFK Ťahanovce	1–4	Slávia TU Košice
FK 05 Levoča	0–0 (1–4 p)	FK Pokrok SEZ Krompachy
ŠK Harichovce	0–3	MŠK Spišské Podhradie
TJ Rozvoj Pušovce	0–4	TJ Sokol Ľubotice
OŠK Fintice	2–4	1. FC Tatran Prešov
FK Široké	1–3	MFK Slovan Sabinov
OTJ Hontianske Nemce	0–0 (2–4 p)	FK Slovenské Ďarmoty
FK Predmier	1–2	TJ Tatran Krásno nad Kysucou
TJ Jasenov	5–0	FK Nižný Hrušov

== Second round ==
64 matches in the second round were played from August 12, 2020, to September 16, 2020.

Team 1	Score	Team 2
MŠK Námestovo	0–7	MŠK Žilina
OFK Dunajská Lužná	0–4	FK Pohronie
MFK Gelnica	0–2	Slavoj Trebišov
Oravan Oravská Jasenica	0–6	ŠK Belá
MŠK Fomat Martin	4–4 (5–6 p)	FK Poprad
FK Nižná	2–3	OŠK Bešeňová
MFK Dolný Kubín	2–4	MŠK Púchov
ŠK Tvrdošín	0–0 (3–5 p)	TJ Tatran Oravské Veselé
TJ Tatran VLM Pliešovce	0–11	MFK Dukla Banská Bystrica
ŠK Blava 1928	0–2	FC Slovan Galanta
MFK Zvolen	0–5	FC Nitra
MŠK Považská Bystrica	1–3	FC Petržalka
OFK Malženice	0–3	FC Spartak Trnava
OFK Tovarníky	0–5	FK Železiarne Podbrezová
PFK Piešťany	0–7	DAC Dunajská Streda
Jednota Sokol Chocholná-Velčice	0–1	FC ŠTK 1914 Šamorín
TJ Kostolné Kračany	0–4	MFK Skalica
OFK 1948 Veľký Lapáš	1–3	FK Dubnica
FK Beluša	0–2	Slovan Bratislava
Spartak Myjava	0-2	AS Trenčín
SFC Kalinkovo	0–7	FK Senica
MFK Rusovce	1–5	KFC Komárno
OFK Olováry	0–6	FC Košice
FK Podkonice	1–4	FC ViOn Zlaté Moravce
TJ Jednota Málinec	4–1	ŠK Hrochoť
TJ ŠK Sokol Jakub	7–1	MFK Detva
TJ Mladosť Kalša	1–2	MFK Zemplín Michalovce
FK Svit	0–3	Partizán Bardejov
ŠK Odeva Lipany	0–4	MFK Ružomberok
TJ Višňové	1–5	MFK Tatran Liptovský Mikuláš
ŠK Gbeľany	0–8	ŠKF Sereď
TJ Jasenov	1–2	MŠK Tesla Stropkov
ŠK Strážske	1–3	OŠK Pavlovce nad Uhom
FK Sobrance – Sobranecko	0–4	MFK Vranov nad Topľou
FK Brezno	0–2	FK Slovenské Ďarmoty
FC Lokomotíva Košice	2–0	FK Čaňa
FK Košická Nová Ves	0–4	Slávia TU Košice
FK Pokrok SEZ Krompachy	1–2	MŠK Spišské Podhradie
1. MFK Kežmarok	3–1	OŠK Rudňany
FK Veľká Lomnica	0–4	MŠK Slavoj Spišská Belá
FK Gerlachov	3–0	TJ Sokol Ľubotice
MFK Slovan Sabinov	0–3	1. FC Tatran Prešov
OŠK Švošov	2–2 (2–4 p)	FK Slávia Staškov
ŠK Javorník Makov	1–1 (7–6 p)	TJ Jednota Bánová
ŠK Sásová	0–0 (3–1 p)	ŠK Prameň Kováčová
FC 98 Hajnáčka	2–2 (7–8 p)	MŠK Rimavská Sobota
MŠK Kysucké Nové Mesto	1–1 (6–5 p)	TJ Tatran Krásno nad Kysucou
TJ Družstevník Zvončín	2–1	FK Bestrent Horná Krupá
ŠK Šoporňa	3–3 (1–3 p)	FC Pata
TJ Veľké Lovce	2–1	TJ Družstevník Bešeňov
MFK Baník Handlová	1–4	OFK Baník Lehota pod Vtáčnikom
TJ Družstevník Jacovce	3–1	ŠK VEGUM Dolné Vestenice
NŠK 1922 Bratislava	0–4	FK Rača Bratislava
PŠC Pezinok	2–3	TJ Rovinka
Lokomotíva Devínska Nová Ves	0–4	FC Malacky
ŠK Závod	0–3	FC Rohožník
FC Slovan Modra	1–0	FK Slovan Most pri Bratislave
TJ Družstevník Radimov	3–0	TJ Nafta Gbely
TJ Považan Pruské	0–3	TJ Spartak Kvašov
ŠK Nevidzany	2–0	FK Kolárovo
ŠK Veľké Zálužie	1–1 (6–7 p)	MŠK Hurbanovo
FK Melčice – Lieskové	2–1	AFC Nové Mesto nad Váhom
ŠK Šurany	2–0	TJ Imeľ
MFK Baník Veľký Krtíš	1–4	TJD Príbelce

== Third round ==
32 matches of the 3rd round were played from September 16. 31 matches finished until October 7. Only one match including DAC Dunajská Streda was rescheduled on a spring 2021 due COVID-19 pandemic and participation in Europa League.

Team 1	Score	Team 2
FK Slávia Staškov	3–4	MFK Tatran Liptovský Mikuláš
MŠK Hurbanovo	0–2	MFK Skalica
ŠK Nevidzany	0–6	FK Dubnica
MFK Vranov nad Topľou	1–3	MFK Zemplín Michalovce
FC Lokomotíva Košice	1–2	Slávia TU Košice
MŠK Spišské Podhradie	2–1	Slavoj Trebišov
1. MFK Kežmarok	1–1 (7–6 p)	Partizán Bardejov
MŠK Slavoj Spišská Belá	2–0	FK Gerlachov
1. FC Tatran Prešov	1–4	MFK Ružomberok
ŠK Belá	1–0	FK Poprad
OŠK Bešeňová	2–1	MŠK Púchov
FK Slovenské Ďarmoty	0–6	MFK Dukla Banská Bystrica
TJ ŠK Sokol Jakub	1–8	FC ViOn Zlaté Moravce
MŠK Rimavská Sobota	0–7	FC Košice
MŠK Kysucké Nové Mesto	4–5	FC Petržalka
TJ Družstevník Zvončín	1–10	FC Spartak Trnava
TJ Veľké Lovce	1–3	OFK Baník Lehota pod Vtáčnikom
TJ Družstevník Jacovce	0–4	FK Železiarne Podbrezová
FC Pata	Cancelled	DAC Dunajská Streda
FK Melčice – Lieskové	0–3	FC Slovan Galanta
ŠK Šurany	1–4	FC ŠTK 1914 Šamorín
TJ Spartak Kvašov	0–6	Slovan Bratislava
TJ Družstevník Radimov	1–2	AS Trenčín
FC Slovan Modra	1–6	KFC Komárno
FC Rohožník	6–1	FC Malacky
TJ Rovinka	3–2	FK Senica
FK Rača Bratislava	0–6	FK Pohronie
OŠK Pavlovce nad Uhom	0–6	MŠK Tesla Stropkov
TJ Tatran Oravské Veselé	1–1 (3–4 p)	MŠK Žilina
ŠK Javorník Makov	1–2	ŠKF Sereď
ŠK Sásová	0–0 (3–1 p)	TJ Jednota Málinec
TJD Príbelce	2–1	FC Nitra

== Fourth round ==
Due COVID-19 pandemic all matches of the 4th and 5th rounds have been rescheduled on a spring 2021. In Slovakia from 11 October no sports event were allowed, expect top leagues of some sports.
On March 10, the organizers Slovak Football Association decided that the competition would be played only with clubs from the first and second leagues. Clubs from the lower leagues have been banned from official matches and trainings since October 2020. There were still 19 clubs from the first and second leagues left in the competition, and there were to be 16 clubs in the 5th round. 6 teams, selected by worst places from 2019–20 Slovak Cup, played an additional play-off in the 4th round. It was Dubnica, Šamorín, Podbrezová, Zemplín Michalovce, Komárno and FC Košice.

Team 1	Score	Team 2
FC Košice	Cancelled	FK Pohronie
Slavoj Spišská Belá	Cancelled	MŠK Tesla Stropkov
FK Dubnica	Cancelled	MFK Ružomberok
MFK Tatran Liptovský Mikuláš	Cancelled	FC Spartak Trnava
MŠK Spišské Podhradie	Cancelled	AS Trenčín
OŠK Bešeňová	Cancelled	KFC Komárno
ŠK Belá	Cancelled	MŠK Žilina
1. MFK Kežmarok	Cancelled	FC ViOn Zlaté Moravce
TJ Rovinka	Cancelled	MFK Zemplín Michalovce
OFK Baník Lehota pod Vtáčnikom	Cancelled	FC Rohožník
FC Slovan Galanta	Cancelled	Slávia TU Košice
FC Petržalka	Cancelled	FC Pata/FC DAC 1904 Dunajská Streda
TJ Príbelce	Cancelled	ŠK Slovan Bratislava
MFK Dukla Banská Bystrica	Cancelled	MFK Skalica
ŠK Sásová	Cancelled	ŠKF Sereď
FC ŠTK 1914 Šamorín	Cancelled	FK Železiarne Podbrezová
23 March 2021
FC ŠTK 1914 Šamorín	1–4^{3}	KFC Komárno
24 March 2021
MFK Zemplín Michalovce	1–1 (3–5 p)^{1}	FC Košice
FK Dubnica	0–3^{2}	FK Železiarne Podbrezová

^{1} Played on neutral pitch in Poprad.
^{2} ^{3}Played on neutral pitch in Topoľčany.

== Round of 16 ==
The draw was on March 25. Matches were played on April 6–7.

Team 1	Score	Team 2
6 April 2021
MFK Dukla Banská Bystrica	0–0 (5–4 p)^{1}	KFC Komárno
FC Košice	0–0 (4–2 p)^{2}	ŠKF Sereď
FK Pohronie	1–2^{3}	FC Petržalka
FC Spartak Trnava	0–1^{7}	AS Trenčín
7 April 2021
MŠK Žilina	1–1 (6–5 p)^{5}	FK Železiarne Podbrezová
FC ViOn Zlaté Moravce	3–1^{6}	MFK Skalica
MFK Ružomberok	1–3^{4}	FC DAC 1904 Dunajská Streda
ŠK Slovan Bratislava	1–0^{8}	MFK Tatran Liptovský Mikuláš

^{1} ^{6} ^{8}Played on neutral pitch on NTC Senec.
^{2} ^{4}Played on neutral pitch in Zvolen.
^{3} ^{5} ^{7}Played on neutral pitch in Topoľčany.

== Quarter-finals ==
The draw was on April 8. Matches was played on April 13–14.

13 April 2021	Košice	3–0	Trenčín	Košice
13:30 CEST (UTC+02:00)	Gáll 18'; Pačinda 70'; Liener 81'	Report		Stadium: Štadión Lokomotívy; Referee: Erik Gemzický

13 April 2021	Zlaté Moravce	0–2	Žilina	Zlaté Moravce
15:30 CEST (UTC+02:00)		Report	Rusnák 33'; Paur 87'	Stadium: Štadión FC ViOn; Referee: Michal Smolák

14 April 2021	Dukla Banská Bystrica	3–2	DAC Dunajská Streda	Zvolen
13:30 CEST (UTC+02:00)	Kupčík 2'; Frimmel 69'; Tóth 90+3'	Report	Müller 20'; Beskorovainyi 66'	Stadium: Štadión MFK Zvolen; Referee: Martin Dohál

14 April 2021	Slovan Bratislava	5–1	Petržalka	Bratislava
15:30 CEST (UTC+02:00)	Abena 13'; De Marco 19'; Strelec 40'; Daniel 46'; Holman 67'	Report	De Marco 79' (o.g.)	Stadium: Tehelné pole Referee: Marián Ruc

== Semi-finals ==
The draw was on April 15. Semi-finals was played on April 28 and May 5.

=== First leg ===
28 April 2021	Košice	2–4	Žilina	Košice
15:30 CEST (UTC+02:00)	Pačinda 47', 86'	Report	Slebodník 28'; Kaprálik 41', 65'; Bernát 87'	Stadium: Štadión Lokomotívy; Referee: Adam Somoláni

29 April 2021	Slovan Bratislava	3–0	Dukla Banská Bystrica	Bratislava
15:30 CEST (UTC+02:00)	De Marco 31'; Strelec 64'; Ožbolt 81'	Report		Stadium: Tehelné pole Referee: Peter Ziemba

=== Second leg ===
4 May 2021	Žilina	4–1 (8–3 agg.)	Košice	Žilina
15:30 CEST (UTC+02:00)	Ďuriš 1'; Bichakhchyan 12' (pen.); Myslovič 38'; Minárik 90'	Report	Pačinda 17'	Stadium: Štadión pod Dubňom; Referee: Martin Dohál

5 May 2021	Dukla Banská Bystrica	1–3 (1–6 agg.)	Slovan Bratislava	Zvolen
15:30 CEST (UTC+02:00)	Abena 20' (o.g.)	Report	Henty 9'; Ožbolt 25'; Lovat 89'	Stadium: Štadión MFK Zvolen; Referee: Bálint Kišš

== Final ==
19 May 2021
18:00 (UTC+2)

Žilina	1–2 (a.e.t.)	Slovan Bratislava
Kiwior 30'	Report	Henty 61'; Weiss 105+4' (pen.)

Tehelné pole, Bratislava
Attendance: 0 (Note: The final was played behind closed doors due to the COVID-19 pandemic in Slovakia.)
Referee: Peter Kráľovič

== See also ==
- 2020–21 Slovak First Football League
