= Timotej Jambor =

Slovak footballer

Personal information
- Date of birth: 4 April 2003 (age 23)
- Place of birth: Svit, Slovakia
- Height: 1.83 m (6 ft 0 in)
- Position: Forward

Team information
- Current team: Rapid București
- Number: 90

Youth career
- 2011–2013: Svit
- 2014–2018: Tatran Prešov
- 2018–2020: Žilina

Senior career*
Years	Team	Apps	(Gls)
2020–2023	Žilina B	36	(11)
2020–2024	Žilina	76	(19)
2024–	Rapid București	27	(1)
2025	→ Žilina (loan)	11	(1)
2025	→ Žilina B (loan)	5	(3)
2026	→ Śląsk Wrocław (loan)	12	(2)

International career^{‡}
2018–2019	Slovakia U16	2	(1)
2019–2020	Slovakia U17	4	(2)
2021	Slovakia U18	2	(1)
2021–2022	Slovakia U19	13	(7)
2022–2023	Slovakia U20	11	(5)
2023–2025	Slovakia U21	15	(4)
- * Club domestic league appearances and goals as of 17 October 2026 ‡ National team caps and goals as of 11 June 2025

Timotej Jambor (born 4 April 2003) is a Slovak professional footballer who plays as a forward for Liga I club Rapid București.

== Club career ==
=== MŠK Žilina ===
Jambor made his Fortuna Liga debut for Žilina during a home fixture against AS Trenčín on 21 November 2020. He came on in the second half to replace Matúš Rusnák, with the final score already set at 2–0 in favour of Šošoni through Ján Bernát and Dawid Kurminowski. He also appeared as a late substitute in the next fixture against Pohronie.

== International career ==
Jambor was first recognised in a Slovak senior national team nomination as an alternate for prospective national team players' training camp in NTC Senec in December 2022, even prior to his call-up for the feeder U21 team.

== Career statistics ==
As of match played 27 October 2026

Appearances and goals by club, season and competition
Club	Season	League			National cup (Note: Includes Slovak Cup, Cupa României)		Europe		Other		Total	
Club	Season	Division	Apps	Goals	Apps	Goals	Apps	Goals	Apps	Goals	Apps	Goals
Žilina B	2019–20	2. Liga	3	0	—		—		—		3	0
Žilina B	2020–21	2. Liga	19	3	—		—		—		19	3
Žilina B	2021–22	2. Liga	9	4	—		—		—		9	4
Žilina B	2022–23	2. Liga	5	4	—		—		—		5	4
Žilina B	Total		36	11	—		—		—		36	11
Žilina	2020–21	Slovak First Football League	4	1	1	0	0	0	—		1	0
Žilina	2021–22	Slovak First Football League	21	4	1	0	4 (Note: Appearances in UEFA Conference League)	0	0	0	26	4
Žilina	2022–23	Slovak First Football League	26	8	1	0	—		—		27	8
Žilina	2023–24	Slovak First Football League	25	6	3	2	4	0	—		32	8
Žilina	Total		76	19	6	2	8	0	0	0	90	21
Rapid București	2024–25	Liga I	10	0	1	0	—		—		11	0
Rapid București	2025–26	Liga I	13	1	2	1	—		—		15	2
Rapid București	2026–27	Liga I	4	0	2	0	—		—		6	0
Rapid București	Total		27	1	5	1	—		—		32	2
Žilina (loan)	2024–25	Slovak First Football League	11	1	1	0	—		—		12	1
Žilina B (loan)	2024–25	2. Liga	5	3	—		—		—		5	3
Śląsk Wrocław (loan)	2025–26	I liga	12	2	—		—		—		12	2
Career total			167	37	12	3	8	0	0	0	187	40

== Personal life ==
His father, Milan Jambor, was also a footballer. He is currently the coach of FK Svit.

== Honours ==
Žilina

- Slovak Cup runner-up: 2020–21
