= 2020–21 Slovak First Football League =

Football league in Slovakia

Slovak Super Liga
- Season: 2020–21
- Dates: 8 August 2020 – 22 May 2021
- Champions: Slovan Bratislava
- Champions League: Slovan Bratislava
- Europa Conference League: DAC Dunajská Streda; Spartak Trnava; MŠK Žilina
- Matches: 197
- Goals: 574 (2.91 per match)
- Top goalscorer: Dawid Kurminowski (19 goals)
- Biggest home win: DAC Dunajská Streda 6–0 Sereď (9 August 2020); DAC Dunajská Streda 6–0 Nitra (15 August 2020)
- Biggest away win: Nitra 0–5 Slovan Bratislava (8 August 2020); Sereď 0–5 Slovan Bratislava (28 February 2021)
- Highest scoring: Žilina 6–2 Zemplín Michalovce (30 August 2020); Sereď 2–6 Spartak Trnava (5 December 2020); Trenčín 2–6 Slovan Bratislava (14 March 2021); Žilina 5–3 Trenčín (8 May 2021)
- Highest attendance: 6,297 DAC Dunajská Streda 2–1 Spartak Trnava (22 August 2020)
- Lowest attendance: 0 (Note: Matches have been played behind closed doors without any spectators.); All matches from 1 October 2020 due to the COVID-19 pandemic.
- All statistics correct as of 24 May 2021.

The 2020–21 Slovak First Football League (known as the Slovak Fortuna liga for sponsorship reasons) was the 28th season of first-tier football league in Slovakia since its establishment in 1993.

Slovan Bratislava were the defending champions for the second successive year, after picking up the domestic double in the previous season. Slovan successfully defended their title, winning their third consecutive title and record-extending 11th Slovak title overall.

In this season, teams were allowed to make five substitutions during matches in a maximum of three stoppages in play for one team.

== Teams ==
Twelve teams competed in the league – all sides from the previous season.

=== Stadiums and locations ===
Location of teams in Fortuna liga 2020–21

AS Trenčín	FC DAC 1904 Dunajská Streda	FK Pohronie	MFK Zemplín Michalovce
Štadión Sihoť; UEFA	MOL Aréna; UEFA	Mestský štadión UEFA	Mestský futbalový štadión UEFA
Capacity: 4,200 (10,000 planned)	Capacity: 12,700	Capacity: 2,309	Capacity: 4,440
FK Senica	MFK Ružomberok	MŠK Žilina	ŠK Slovan Bratislava
OMS Arena; UEFA	Štadión pod Čebraťom	Štadión pod Dubňom; UEFA	Tehelné pole UEFA
Capacity: 5,070	Capacity: 4,817	Capacity: 11,253	Capacity: 22,500
FC Spartak Trnava	ŠKF Sereď	FC ViOn Zlaté Moravce	FC Nitra
ŠAM - City Arena; UEFA	Štadión FC ViOn; UEFA	Štadión FC ViOn; UEFA	Štadión pod Zoborom; UEFA
Capacity: 19,200	Capacity: 4,000	Capacity: 4,000	Capacity: 7,480

=== Personnel and kits ===
Team	President	Manager	Captain	Kit manufacturer	Shirt sponsor
DAC Dunajská Streda	(Slovakia) Oszkár Világi	(Hungary) Antal Németh (carateker)	(Hungary) Zsolt Kalmár	(Italy) macron	Kukkonia
Nitra	(Slovakia) Ladislav Palaky	(Czech Republic) Michal Ščasný	(Slovakia) Erik Jendrišek	(Germany) Adidas	
Pohronie	(Slovakia) Jozef Urblík	(Czech Republic) Jan Kameník	(Czech Republic) Petr Pavlík	(Italy) Erreà	REMESLO
Ružomberok	(Slovakia) Milan Fiľo	(Slovakia) Ján Haspra	(Slovakia) Ján Maslo	(Germany) Adidas	MAESTRO
Senica	(Czech Republic) Oldřich Duda	(Slovakia) Karol Praženica	(Slovakia) Juraj Piroska	(Denmark) hummel	KOMPLEXX GROUP SK
Sereď	(Slovakia) Róbert Stareček	(Slovakia) Gergely Geri	(Slovakia) Ľubomír Michalík	(United States) Nike	
Slovan Bratislava	(Slovakia) Ivan Kmotrík	(Slovakia) Vladimír Weiss	(Bulgaria) Vasil Bozhikov	(Germany) Adidas	Niké
Spartak Trnava	(Slovakia) Milan Cuninka	(Slovakia) Michal Gašparík	(Slovakia) Dobrivoj Rusov	(Germany) Adidas	
Trenčín	(Slovakia) Jozef Liptovský	(Slovakia) Juraj Ančic (carateker)	(Netherlands) Aschraf El Mahdioui	(Italy) macron	ORION Tip
Zemplín Michalovce	(Slovakia) Ján Sabol	(Slovakia) Anton Šoltis	(Slovakia) Igor Žofčák	(Germany) Adidas	ISDB, St. Nicolaus
Zlaté Moravce	(Slovakia) Karol Škula	(Slovakia) Ľuboš Benkovský	(Slovakia) Tomáš Ďubek	(Italy) Erreà	ViOn
Žilina	(Slovakia) Jozef Antošík	(Slovakia) Pavol Staňo	(Slovakia) Jakub Paur	(United States) Nike	Preto

=== Managerial changes ===
Team	Outgoing manager	Manner of departure	Date of vacancy	Position in table	Replaced by	Date of appointment
Senica	(Slovakia) Patrik Durkáč	End of a contract	14 July 2020	Pre-season	(Slovakia) Anton Šoltis	14 July 2020
Trenčín	(Slovakia) Juraj Ančic	End of interim spell	17 July 2020	Pre-season	(Belgium) Stijn Vreven	17 July 2020
Slovan Bratislava	(Slovakia) Ján Kozák	Released	4 September 2020	3	(Slovenia) Darko Milanič	7 September 2020
Spartak Trnava	(Slovakia) Marián Šarmír	Released	14 September 2020	6	(Slovakia) Norbert Hrnčár	14 September 2020
Pohronie	(Slovakia) Mikuláš Radványi	Released	9 October 2020	12	(Czech Republic) Jan Kameník	12 October 2020
Nitra	(Slovakia) Gergely Geri	Own request	30 November 2020	7	(Slovakia) Ivan Galád (interim)	1 December 2020
Sereď	(Slovakia) Peter Lérant	End of a contract	15 December 2020	7	(Czech Republic) František Šturma	29 December 2020
Spartak Trnava	(Slovakia) Norbert Hrnčár	Released	31 December 2020	5	(Slovakia) Michal Gašparík	1 January 2021
Nitra	(Slovakia) Ivan Galád	End of interim spell	3 January 2021	8	(Czech Republic) Michal Ščasný	3 January 2021
Nitra	(Czech Republic) Michal Ščasný	Released	22 January 2021	8	(Slovakia) Peter Lérant	22 January 2021
Senica	(Slovakia) Anton Šoltis	Released	20 February 2021	12	(Slovakia) Karol Praženica	23 February 2021
Sereď	(Czech Republic) František Šturma	Health and family reasons	16 February 2021	9	(Slovakia) Ján Blaháč (interim)	16 February 2021
Sereď	(Slovakia) Ján Blaháč	Interim	8 March 2021	10	(Slovakia) Gergely Geri	8 March 2021
Nitra	(Slovakia) Peter Lérant	Released	25 March 2021	11	(Czech Republic) Michal Ščasný	26 March 2021
Michalovce	(Slovakia) Jozef Majoroš	Released	13 April 2021	11	(Slovakia) Anton Šoltis	13 April 2021
Dunajská Streda	(Germany) Bernd Storck	Released	21 April 2021	2	(Hungary) Antal Németh (interim)	21 April 2021
Trenčín	(Belgium) Stijn Vreven	Released	27 April 2021	6	(Slovakia) Juraj Ančic (interim)	27 April 2021
Slovan Bratislava	(Slovenia) Darko Milanič	Released	10 May 2021	1	(Slovakia) Vladimír Weiss	12 May 2021

== Regular stage ==
=== League table ===
Pos	Team	Pld	W	D	L	GF	GA	GD	Pts	Qualification
1	Slovan Bratislava	22	17	3	2	54	12	+42	54	Qualification for the championship group
2	DAC Dunajská Streda	22	13	5	4	48	28	+20	44	Qualification for the championship group
3	Žilina	22	11	4	7	49	33	+16	37	Qualification for the championship group
4	Spartak Trnava	22	11	2	9	32	29	+3	35	Qualification for the championship group
5	Zlaté Moravce	22	9	6	7	38	29	+9	33	Qualification for the championship group
6	Trenčín	22	7	7	8	30	38	−8	28	Qualification for the championship group
7	Ružomberok	22	5	8	9	31	37	−6	23	Qualification for the relegation group
8	Nitra	22	6	4	12	21	38	−17	22	Qualification for the relegation group
9	Zemplín Michalovce	22	5	7	10	22	42	−20	22	Qualification for the relegation group
10	Sereď	22	5	7	10	22	39	−17	22	Qualification for the relegation group
11	Senica	22	5	6	11	23	40	−17	21	Qualification for the relegation group
12	Pohronie	22	3	11	8	27	32	−5	20	Qualification for the relegation group

Source: Niké liga (in Slovak)
Rules for classification: 1) Points; 2) Head-to-head points; 3) Head-to-head goal difference; 4) Head-to-head away goals scored; 5) Play-off.

=== Results ===
Each team plays home-and-away against every other team in the league, for a total of 22 matches each.

Home \ Away	DAC	NIT	POH	RUŽ	SEN	SER	SLO	TRN	TRE	ZMI	ZLM	ŽIL
DAC Dunajská Streda		6–0	0–0	3–2	2–0	6–0	1–1	2–1	3–1	2–1	1–3	1–1
Nitra	0–1		3–1	1–1	1–1	3–0	0–5	0–1	1–2	1–1	0–1	0–3
Pohronie	1–2	3–1		2–2	1–2	2–2	1–2	3–3	0–1	1–1	2–2	2–1
Ružomberok	1–1	3–0	0–0		2–3	0–0	0–0	0–1	2–2	4–0	2–1	2–1
Senica	2–4	0–0	1–1	1–2		2–2	0–3	0–2	2–3	3–0	1–1	0–4
Sereď	1–0	1–2	0–2	0–0	4–0		0–5	2–6	1–1	1–1	1–2	3–2
Slovan Bratislava	3–1	0–1	1–0	5–0	2–0	3–0		2–0	2–0	5–0	2–1	3–2
Spartak Trnava	0–2	0–2	1–1	3–1	1–0	0–2	0–3		2–0	1–2	1–0	2–1
Trenčín	3–3	3–2	1–1	3–1	0–1	1–0	1–2	2–0		2–2	1–1	2–4
Zemplín Michalovce	2–4	1–0	2–0	4–3	0–1	0–2	0–2	0–2	1–1		1–0	1–1
Zlaté Moravce	1–2	3–1	2–2	3–1	2–2	1–0	2–1	2–4	5–0	0–0		4–0
Žilina	4–1	1–2	2–1	3–2	3–1	0–0	2–2	2–1	2–0	6–2	4–1	

Source: Niké liga (in Slovak)
Legend: Blue = home team win; Yellow = draw; Red = away team win.

== Championship group ==
Pos	Team	Pld	W	D	L	GF	GA	GD	Pts	Qualification	SLO	DAC	TRN	ŽIL	ZLM	TRE
1	Slovan Bratislava (C)	32	22	5	5	78	28	+50	71	Qualification for the Champions League first qualifying round	—	0–1	1–2	2–2	4–1	2–1
2	DAC Dunajská Streda	32	19	8	5	66	38	+28	65	Qualification for the Europa Conference League second qualifying round	2–2	—	2–0	2–1	2–0	2–0
3	Spartak Trnava	32	17	4	11	48	37	+11	55	Qualification for the Europa Conference League first qualifying round	3–0	3–2	—	1–1	3–0	2–0
4	Žilina	32	15	7	10	73	52	+21	52	Qualification for the Europa Conference League play-offs	2–3	3–3	2–1	—	5–1	5–3
5	Zlaté Moravce	32	11	7	14	42	51	−9	40	Qualification for the Europa Conference League play-offs	0–4	0–1	0–0	1–0	—	1–0
6	Trenčín	32	8	8	16	42	61	−19	32	Qualification for the Europa Conference League play-offs	2–6	1–1	0–1	2–3	3–0	—

Source: Niké liga (in Slovak)
Legend: Blue = home team win; Yellow = draw; Red = away team win.
Rules for classification: 1) Points; 2) Head-to-head points; 3) Head-to-head goal difference; 4) Head-to-head away goals scored; 5) Play-off.
(C) Champions

== Relegation group ==
Pos	Team	Pld	W	D	L	GF	GA	GD	Pts	Qualification or relegation	SER	RUŽ	POH	ZMI	SEN	NIT
7	Sereď	32	11	8	13	37	48	−11	41	Qualification for the Europa Conference League play-offs	—	1–0	0–1	2–0	4–1	2–1
8	Ružomberok	32	10	9	13	41	44	−3	39		2–1	—	1–0	2–0	1–1	2–0
9	Pohronie	32	8	14	10	38	38	0	38		1–2	1–0	—	0–0	3–0	0–0
10	Zemplín Michalovce	32	8	11	13	34	53	−19	35		2–2	2–1	1–2	—	1–0	1–1
11	Senica (O)	32	8	9	15	31	51	−20	33	Qualification for the relegation play-offs	1–0	0–1	0–0	1–1	—	1–0
12	Nitra (R)	32	7	6	19	26	55	−29	27	Relegation to the 2. Liga	0–1	1–0	2–3	0–4	0–3	—

Source: Niké liga (in Slovak)
Legend: Blue = home team win; Yellow = draw; Red = away team win.
Rules for classification: 1) Points; 2) Head-to-head points; 3) Head-to-head goal difference; 4) Head-to-head away goals scored; 5) Play-off.
(O) Play-off winners; (R) Relegated

== Europa Conference League play-offs ==
Should one of the top 3 teams win the 2020–21 Slovak Cup, Europa Conference League qualification playoffs will be held among the 4th, 5th, 6th team in the championship group and the top team of the relegation round. On 19 May 2021, Slovan Bratislava, who have won the league title, also won the cup, thus confirming the need of playoffs.

The 4th team play the top team of the relegation group and the 5th play the 6th in the semifinals. Winners of the semifinals play the final to determine the Europa Conference League qualification spot. Europa Conference League qualification playoff games are one-leg and played at the home pitch of the higher-ranked team. The winners qualify for the first qualifying round of the 2021–22 UEFA Europa Conference League.

=== Semi-finals ===
25 May 2021
19:00

MŠK Žilina	4–2	ŠKF Sereď
Kurminowski 9'; Rusnák 32'; Bernát 38'; Slebodník 87'	Report	Bušnja 60'; Jureškin 83'

Štadión pod Dubňom, Žilina
Attendance: 164
Referee: Michal Smolák
25 May 2021
19:00

FC ViOn Zlaté Moravce	2–0	AS Trenčín
Balaj 51'; Švec 57'	Report

ViOn Aréna, Zlaté Moravce
Attendance: 217
Referee: Peter Kráľovič

=== Final ===
28 May 2021
19:00

MŠK Žilina	3−2 (a.e.t.)	FC ViOn Zlaté Moravce
Bichakhchyan 43' (pen.), 45+8' (pen.); Jibril 101'	Report	Balaj 13'; Hrnčár 23'

Štadión pod Dubňom, Žilina
Attendance: 340
Referee: Filip Glova

== Relegation play-offs ==
The team which finished 11th faced the 2nd team from 2. Liga 2020–21 for one spot in the top flight the next season.

All times are CEST (UTC+2).

=== First leg ===
25 May 2021
17:00

MFK Dukla Banská Bystrica	1–2	FK Senica
Laksik 63'	Report	Malec 23'; Malec 49'

MFK Lokomotíva Zvolen Stadium, Zvolen
Attendance: 350
Referee: Michal Očenáš

=== Second leg ===
28 May 2021
17:00

FK Senica	1–1	MFK Dukla Banská Bystrica
Malec 41'	Report	Gamboš 89' (o.g.)

Štadión FK Senica, Senica
Attendance: 500
Referee: Ivan Kružliak

== Position by round ==
The table lists the positions of teams after each week of matches. In order to preserve chronological progress, any postponed matches are not included in the round at which they were originally scheduled but added to the full round they were played immediately afterwards. For example, if a match is scheduled for matchday 13, but then postponed and played between days 16 and 17, it will be added to the standings for day 16.

Qualification for the Champions League first qualifying round
Qualification for the Europa Conference League
Qualification for the relegation play-offs
Relegation to the 2. liga

Team \ Round	1	2	3	4	5	6	7	8	9	10	11	12	13	14	15	16	17	18	19	20	21	22	23	24	25	26	27	28	29	30	31	32
Slovan Bratislava	2	1	3	2	2	2	2	2	2	2	2	2	1	1	1	1	1	1	1	1	1	1	1	1	1	1	1	1	1	1	1	1
DAC Dunajská Streda	1	2	1	1	1	1	1	1	1	1	1	1	2	2	2	2	2	2	2	2	2	2	2	2	2	2	2	2	2	2	2	2
Spartak Trnava	4	3	2	3	5	6	5	3	5	5	4	6	5	4	6	5	5	4	4	4	3	4	4	4	4	4	3	3	3	3	3	3
Žilina	3	4	4	4	3	4	4	6	4	3	3	3	3	3	3	3	3	3	3	3	4	3	3	3	3	3	4	4	4	4	4	4
Zlaté Moravce	7	8	5	6	7	7	10	7	8	8	6	5	4	5	4	4	4	5	5	5	5	5	5	5	5	5	5	5	5	5	5	5
Trenčín	6	7	10	9	11	10	8	8	11	9	12	10	11	12	10	10	10	10	8	7	6	6	6	6	6	6	6	6	6	6	6	6
Sereď	12	5	6	7	4	3	3	4	6	7	8	8	8	8	8	8	7	7	9	8	8	10	7	9	7	7	7	8	8	7	8	7
Ružomberok	5	10	11	10	9	11	7	9	7	6	5	7	7	7	5	6	6	6	6	6	7	7	11	8	9	9	8	7	7	8	7	8
Pohronie	8	9	9	5	6	8	9	10	12	10	11	12	12	11	12	12	12	9	7	10	11	12	10	7	8	8	9	9	9	9	9	9
Zemplín Michalovce	9	11	12	12	12	12	12	11	10	12	10	9	10	10	11	11	11	11	11	11	12	9	9	12	11	11	12	12	11	11	11	10
Senica	10	12	7	11	10	9	11	12	9	11	9	11	9	9	9	9	9	12	12	12	10	11	12	10	12	12	10	10	10	10	10	11
Nitra	11	6	8	8	8	5	6	5	3	4	7	4	6	6	7	7	8	8	10	9	9	8	8	11	10	10	11	11	12	12	12	12

Source: Niké liga (in Slovak)

== Season statistics ==
As of 23 May 2021

=== Top goalscorers ===
Rank	Player	Club	Goals
1	(Poland) Dawid Kurminowski^{1}	Žilina	19
2	(Venezuela) Eric Ramirez	DAC Dunajská Streda	16
3	(Slovakia) Filip Balaj^{2}	Zlaté Moravce	14
3	(Brazil) Rafael Ratão	Slovan Bratislava	14
5	(Hungary) Zsolt Kalmár	DAC Dunajská Streda	13
6	(Bosnia and Herzegovina) Hamza Čataković	Trenčín	12
7	(Croatia) Marko Divković	DAC Dunajská Streda	11
7	(Slovakia) Martin Regáli	Ružomberok	11
9	(Hungary) Dávid Holman	Slovan Bratislava	10
10	(Armenia) Vahan Bichakhchyan^{1}	Žilina	9
10	(Slovakia) David Strelec	Slovan Bratislava	9
10	(Nigeria) Bamidele Yusuf	Trnava	9

^{1} plus 1 play-off goal
^{2} plus 2 play-off goals

=== Hat-tricks ===
Round	Player	For	Against	Result	Date	Ref
7	(Slovakia) Ladislav Almási	Ružomberok	Zemplín Michalovce	4–0 (H)	19 September 2020	
10	(Slovakia) Filip Balaj	Zlaté Moravce	Nitra	3–1 (H)	17 October 2020	
13	(Slovakia) Filip Balaj	Zlaté Moravce	Trenčín	5–0 (H)	7 November 2020	
18	(Slovakia) Martin Regáli	Ružomberok	Zemplín Michalovce	3–4 (A)	16 December 2020	
CH.10	(Poland) Dawid Kurminowski	Žilina	Zlaté Moravce	5–1 (H)	22 May 2021	

=== Clean sheets ===
Rank	Player	Club	Clean sheets
1	(Slovakia) Dominik Greif	Slovan Bratislava	12
2	(Nigeria) Mathew Yakubu	Sereď	10
2	(Czech Republic) Martin Jedlička	DAC Dunajská Streda	10
4	(Slovakia) Adrián Chovan	Zlaté Moravce	8
5	(Slovakia) Dobrivoj Rusov	Spartak Trnava	7
5	(Slovakia) Libor Hrdlička	Pohronie	7
7	(Croatia) Matej Marković	Zemplín Michalovce	6
7	(Slovakia) Dávid Šípoš	Nitra	6
9	(Slovakia) Matúš Macík	Ružomberok	5
10	(Czech Republic) Tomáš Fryšták	Senica	4
10	(Belgium) Olivier Vliegen	Senica	4
10	(Slovakia) Samuel Petráš	Žilina	4
10	(Slovakia) Ivan Krajčírik	MFK Ružomberok	4
10	(Slovakia) Dominik Takáč	Trnava	4

=== Discipline ===
==== Player ====
- Most yellow cards: 10
  - (Netherlands) Joeri de Kamps (Slovan Bratislava)
  - (Slovakia) Martin Mikovič (Spartak Trnava)
- Most red cards: 2
  - (Slovakia) Tomáš Hučko (Sereď)
  - (Nigeria) Abdul Zubairu (Trenčín)
  - (Netherlands) Aschraf El Mahdioui (Trenčín)

==== Club ====
- Most yellow cards: 84
  - Sereď
- Most red cards: 6
  - Spartak Trnava

== Awards ==
=== Monthly awards ===
Month	Player of the Month		Goal of the Month		References
Month	Player	Club	Player	Club	References
August	(Hungary) Zsolt Kalmár	DAC Dunajská Streda	(Venezuela) Eric Ramírez	DAC Dunajská Streda	
September	(Slovakia) Ladislav Almási	Ružomberok	(Venezuela) Eric Ramírez	DAC Dunajská Streda	
October	(Slovakia) Filip Balaj	Zlaté Moravce	(Croatia) Andrija Balić	DAC Dunajská Streda	
November	(Slovakia) David Hrnčár ^{1}	Zlaté Moravce	(Greece) Kyriakos Savvidis	Spartak Trnava	
December	(Slovakia) David Hrnčár ^{1}	Zlaté Moravce	(Czech Republic) Erik Daniel	Slovan Bratislava	
February/March	(Venezuela) Eric Ramírez	DAC Dunajská Streda	(Hungary) Zsolt Kalmár	DAC Dunajská Streda	
April	not announced		(Croatia) Andrija Balić	DAC Dunajska Streda	
May	not announced		(Slovakia) Alex Iván	Sereď	

^{1} Vote of the player of the month was united for November and December.

=== Team of the Season ===

Team of the Season
Goalkeeper	(Slovakia) Dominik Greif (Slovan Bratislava)			
Defenders	(Argentina) Vernon De Marco (Slovan Bratislava)	(Poland) Jakub Kiwior (Žilina)	(Bulgaria) Vasil Bozhikov (Slovan Bratislava)	(Panama) César Blackman (DAC Dunajská Streda)
Midfielders	(Slovakia) David Hrnčár (Zlaté Moravce)	(Netherlands) Joeri de Kamps (Slovan Bratislava)	(Hungary) Zsolt Kalmár (DAC Dunajská Streda)	(Brazil) Rafael Ratão (Slovan Bratislava)
Forwards	(Slovakia) David Strelec (Slovan Bratislava)		(Venezuela) Eric Ramírez (DAC Dunajská Streda)	

=== Top Eleven U-21 ===
- Goalkeeper: (Slovakia) Samuel Petráš (Žilina)
- Defence: (Panama) César Blackman (DAC Dunajská Streda), (Poland) Jakub Piotr Kiwior (Žilina), (Slovakia) Branislav Sluka (Žilina)
- Midfield: (Slovakia) David Strelec (Slovan Bratislava), (Brazil) Saymon Cabral (Spartak Trnava), (Hungary) András Schäfer (DAC Dunajská Streda), (Slovakia) Dávid Ďuriš (Žilina), (Croatia) Marko Divković (DAC Dunajská Streda)
- Attack: (Poland) Dawid Kurminowski (Žilina), (Venezuela) Eric Ramírez (DAC Dunajská Streda)

=== Individual awards ===
Manager of the season

(Slovakia) Pavol Staňo (Žilina)

Player of the Year

(Hungary) Zsolt Kalmár (DAC Dunajská Streda)

Young player of the Year

(Slovakia) David Hrnčár (Zlaté Moravce)

== See also ==
- 2020–21 Slovak Cup
- 2020–21 2. Liga (Slovakia)
- List of Slovak football transfers summer 2020
- List of Slovak football transfers winter 2020–21
- List of foreign Slovak First League players
