= Adrián Kaprálik =

Slovak footballer

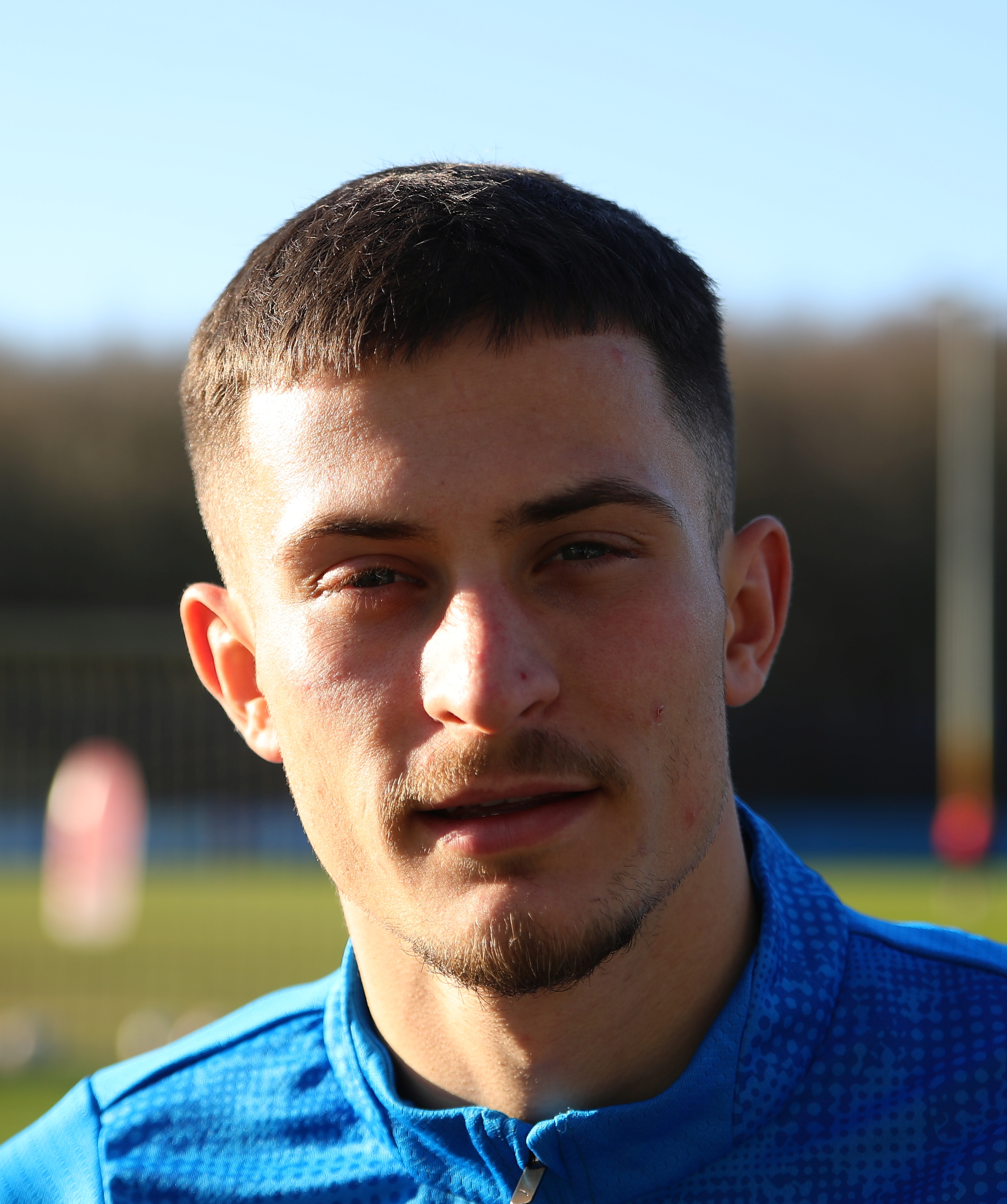
- Kaprálik in 2026

Personal information
- Date of birth: 10 June 2002 (age 24)
- Place of birth: Trstená, Slovakia
- Height: 1.78 m (5 ft 10 in)
- Position: Forward

Team information
- Current team: Holstein Kiel
- Number: 20

Youth career
- 2009–2015: Oravan Oravská Jasenica
- 2015–2019: Žilina

Senior career*
Years	Team	Apps	(Gls)
2019–2023	Žilina B	23	(6)
2020–2025	Žilina	114	(25)
2023–2024	→ Górnik Zabrze (loan)	30	(7)
2025–	Holstein Kiel	30	(4)

International career^{‡}
2016	Slovakia U15	2	(0)
2017–2018	Slovakia U16	3	(0)
2019	Slovakia U17	5	(1)
2019	Slovakia U18	3	(0)
2021	Slovakia U19	1	(0)
2021–2025	Slovakia U21	36	(10)
2022–	Slovakia	5	(1)
- * Club domestic league appearances and goals as of 18 May 2026 ‡ National team caps and goals as of 16 November 2026

Adrián Kaprálik (born 10 June 2002) is a Slovak professional footballer who plays as a forward for German 2. Bundesliga club Holstein Kiel and the Slovakia national team.

== Club career ==
Kaprálik made his Fortuna Liga debut for Žilina in a home fixture against Spartak Trnava on 14 June 2020.He came on as a second-half replacement for Patrik Iľko, when Žilina led by a single goal, following strikes by Dávid Ďuriš and Ján Bernát. The scoresheet remained unchanged and Žilina took the 2–1 victory. He scored his first league goal in a 4–2 win over AS Trenčín.

On 15 August 2023, after making six appearances and scoring thrice across all competitions at the start of the 2023–24 campaign, Kaprálik joined Polish Ekstraklasa side Górnik Zabrze on a year loan. He scored a late league goal against Ruch Chorzów which ended in a 2–1 victory for Górnik Zabrze. He returned to Žilina at the conclusion of the 2023–24 season.

He sustained a broken leg in January 2025 during Žilina's winter training camp in the United Arab Emirates. On 22 August 2025, Kaprálik signed a four-season contract with Holstein Kiel in German 2. Bundesliga.

== International career ==
On 17 November 2022, Kaprálik received his first call-up to the Slovak senior squad for two friendly matches against Montenegro and Chile. He made his international debut in the match against Chile on 20 November, which finished as a goalless draw, coming on as an 89th minute substitute for Tomáš Suslov. He was named in Slovakia's squad for the 2025 UEFA European Under-21 Championship in June 2025.

== Career statistics ==
=== Club ===
As of match played 17 May 2026

Appearances and goals by club, season and competition
Club	Season	League			National cup (Note: Includes Slovak Cup, Polish Cup)		Continental		Other		Total	
Club	Season	Division	Apps	Goals	Apps	Goals	Apps	Goals	Apps	Goals	Apps	Goals
Žilina	2019–20	Fortuna Liga	2	0	—		—		—		2	0
Žilina	2020–21	Fortuna Liga	31	2	6	2	1 (Note: Appearance in UEFA Europa League)	0	—		38	4
Žilina	2021–22	Fortuna Liga	25	4	3	0	8 (Note: Appearances in UEFA Conference League)	0	—		36	4
Žilina	2022–23	Fortuna Liga	33	10	3	1	—		—		36	11
Žilina	2023–24	Fortuna Liga	3	1	0	0	3	2	—		6	3
Žilina	2024–25	Fortuna Liga	16	6	1	1	—		—		17	7
Žilina	2025–26	Fortuna Liga	4	2	—		2	0	—		6	2
Žilina	Total		114	25	13	4	14	2	—		141	31
Górnik Zabrze (loan)	2023–24	Ekstraklasa	30	7	2	1	—		—		32	8
Holstein Kiel	2025–26	2. Bundesliga	30	4	3	0	—		—		33	4
Career total			174	36	18	5	14	2	0	0	206	43

=== International ===
As of match played 16 November 2026

Appearances and goals by national team and year
National team	Year	Apps	Goals
Slovakia	2022	1	0
Slovakia	2023	0	0
Slovakia	2024	0	0
Slovakia	2025	0	0
Slovakia	2026	4	1
Total		5	1

Scores and results list Slovakia's goal tally first, score column indicates score after each Kaprálik goal.

List of international goals scored by Adrián Kaprálik
No.	Date	Venue	Cap	Opponent	Score	Result	Competition
1	16 November 2026	Astana Arena, Astana, Kazakhstan	5	Kazakhstan	2–2	2–2	2026–27 Nations League C
