= Patrik Iľko =

Slovak footballer

Personal information
- Date of birth: 16 February 2001 (age 25)
- Place of birth: Bardejov, Slovakia
- Height: 1.80 m (5 ft 11 in)
- Position: Forward

Team information
- Current team: Žilina
- Number: 16

Youth career
- 2009–2012: FK ŠK Fričkovce
- 2011–2012: → TJ Pokrok Abrahámovce (loan)
- 2012–2016: Partizán Bardejov
- 2016–2018: Žilina

Senior career*
Years	Team	Apps	(Gls)
2018–2021	Žilina B	29	(7)
2020–	Žilina	170	(21)

International career
2018	Slovakia U17	3	(1)
2019	Slovakia U18	1	(0)
2019	Slovakia U19	7	(0)
2021–2022	Slovakia U21	7	(3)
- * Club domestic league appearances and goals as of 21 September 2026

Patrik Iľko (born 16 February 2001) is a Slovak professional footballer who plays for Niké Liga club MŠK Žilina as a forward.

== Club career ==
Iľko made his Fortuna Liga debut for Žilina during an away fixture against Pohronie on 22 February 2020. He came on in the second half's stoppage time to replace Dávid Ďuriš and delay the play along with Kristián Vallo, who replaced Benson Anang. Žilina collected a 1–0 victory after a goal by Dawid Kurminowski of the 75th minute.

== Honours ==
Žilina

- Slovak Cup: 2025–26
