= Milan Jambor =

Slovak footballer

Personal information
- Full name: Milan Jambor
- Date of birth: 27 November 1975 (age 50)
- Place of birth: Poprad, Czechoslovakia
- Height: 1.87 m (6 ft 2 in)
- Position: Midfielder

Team information
- Current team: FK Svit (Playing manager)

Senior career*
Years	Team	Apps	(Gls)
1996–2001	Prešov	83	(8)
1998–2001	Košice		
2002–2005	Púchov		
2006–2008	Žižkov	3	(0)
2008–2010	Svit	12	(1)
Total		98	(9)

Managerial career
- 2012–: Svit (playing coach)
- * Club domestic league appearances and goals as of 23 March 2012

Milan Jambor (born 27 November 1975 in Poprad) is a Slovak football midfielder and player-coach of FK Svit.

== Club ==
As a player of FK Matador Púchov, Jambor famously scored the late equalizer against FC Barcelona in the first leg of the first round of the 2003–04 UEFA Cup, with the match ending 1-1. FC Barcelona won the second leg at the Nou Camp 8-0.

== Personal life ==
His son, Timotej Jambor, is also a footballer. He currently plays for MŠK Žilina.
