= Ezekiel Henty =

Nigerian footballer (born 1993)

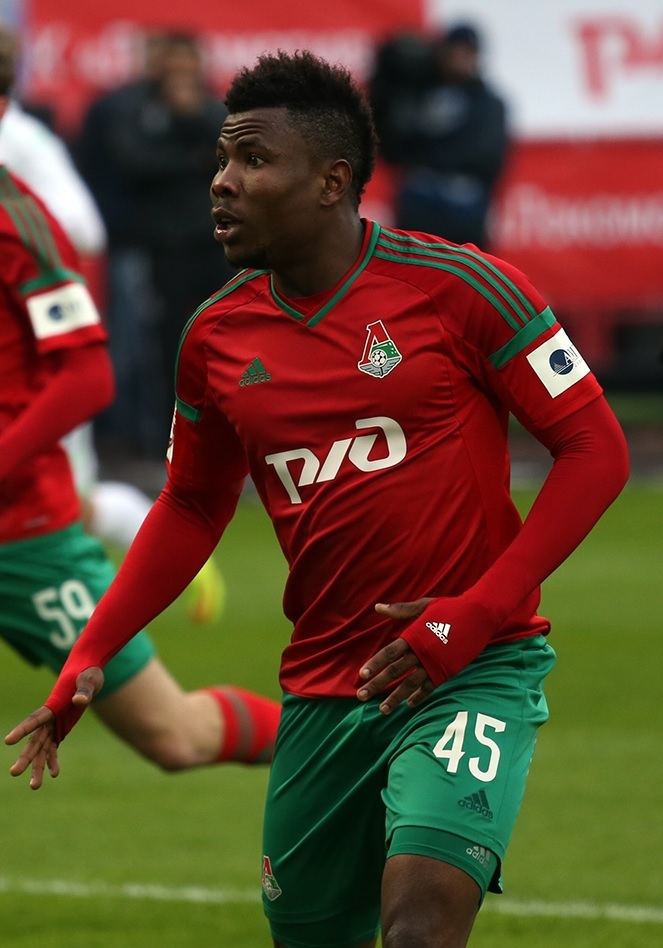
- Henty playing for Lokomotiv in 2016

Personal information
- Full name: Ezekiel Isoken Henty
- Date of birth: 13 May 1993 (age 33)
- Place of birth: Lagos, Nigeria
- Height: 1.85 m (6 ft 1 in)
- Position: Forward

Team information
- Current team: Hapoel Ramat Gan
- Number: 13

Youth career
- Flying Sports
- 2012–2013: AC Milan

Senior career*
Years	Team	Apps	(Gls)
2013–2015	AC Milan	0	(0)
2013–2014	→ Spezia (loan)	6	(1)
2014	→ Perugia (loan)	10	(1)
2014	→ Gorica (loan)	10	(2)
2015	→ Olimpija Ljubljana (loan)	14	(4)
2015	Olimpija Ljubljana	21	(8)
2016–2017	Lokomotiv Moscow	17	(1)
2017	→ Baniyas (loan)	12	(5)
2017–2018	MOL Vidi	15	(5)
2018	→ Puskás Akadémia (loan)	11	(3)
2018–2020	Puskás Akadémia	12	(7)
2018–2019	→ Osijek (loan)	17	(4)
2020–2023	Slovan Bratislava	48	(15)
2022	→ Al-Hazem (loan)	9	(0)
2022–2023	→ Apollon Limassol (loan)	24	(2)
2023–2024	AEL Limassol	10	(2)
2024	F.C. Ashdod	14	(4)
2024–2025	Maccabi Bnei Reineh	27	(4)
2026–	Hapoel Ramat Gan	19	(9)
- * Club domestic league appearances and goals as of 24 June 2026

Ezekiel Isoken Henty (born 13 May 1993) is a Nigerian footballer who plays as a striker for Israeli club Hapoel Ramat Gan.

== Club career ==
=== AC Milan ===
Born in Lagos, Nigeria, Henty began his career at Flying Sports before joining AC Milan on 15 September 2012, alongside Favour Aniekan and was assigned to Milan Primavera. After being assigned to Milan Primavera, Henty went on to score 10 times in 22 appearances in all competitions, including scoring two braces against Cittadella Primavera and Udinese Primavera. While at Milan Primavera, Henty began taking responsibility since moving to Europe and have since grown up.

Ahead of the 2013–14 season, Henty was told by AC Milan management that he would need to be loaned out to gain first team experience. The following month, in July, it was announced that Henty was loaned out to Serie B side Spezia for the remainder of the 2013–14 season. After starting out on the substitute bench, Henty then scored his first Spezia goal on 24 September 2013, in a 2–1 win over Ternana. However, he struggled in the first team at Spezia and returned to his parent club, with just six appearances and scoring once.

Shortly after the end of his loan spell at Spezia, Henty joined Lega Pro side Perugia on loan for the rest of the season on 9 January 2014. Henty made his Perugia debut on 12 January 2014, coming on as a late substitute, in a 5–0 win over AS Gubbio. It wasn't until on 24 January 2014 when he scored again, in a 3–2 win over Grosseto. Although his playing time was reduced towards the end of the season, Henty played a role in the play-offs against Virtus Entella when he scored in a 3–1 win to help the club gain promotion to Serie B. At his time at Perugia, Henty went on to score 2 times in twelve appearances.

In the summer of 2014, Henty was linked around Europe with a move to Sivasspor and Vitória. Instead, Henty opted to join Slovenian side Gorica on loan on 29 August 2014. Two days later, on 31 August 2014, he made his Gorica debut, coming on as a second-half substitute, in a 2–1 loss against Rudar Velenje. It wasn't until on 29 September 2014 when he scored his first goal for the club, in a 2–1 win over Krka. He then scored again on 19 October 2014, in a 3–0 win over Radomlje. However, he found himself on the sidelines when he suffered an injury in late October. Despite this, Henty went on to score two times in thirteen appearances for the side.

=== Olimpija Ljubljana ===
It was announced on 31 January 2015 that Henty joined Olimpija Ljubljana on loan for the rest of the season. It came after when he went on a trial at the club and his loan spell at Gorica ended. It was previously hinted that Henty was on a move to Turkey before joining Olimpija Ljubija. He made his Olimpija Ljubljana debut on 28 February 2015, in a 4–0 win over Radomlje. It wasn't until on 14 March 2015 when he scored his first goal for the club, in a 3–1 win over Gorica. Henty scored again on 4 April 2015, in a 3–1 win over Zavrč. After adding two more goals, he went on to finish the season, making 14 appearances and scoring 4 times.

In the summer transfer of 2015, Henty joined Olimpija Ljubljana on a permanent for a transfer fee of €150,000, signing a two-year contract. He then scored his first goals since joining the club, in a 4–1 win over Koper on 12 August 2015, followed up by scoring another brace in a 3–0 win over Maribor four days later. In a 5–0 win over Krško on 4 October 2015, Henty set up two goals, which was then followed up by scoring a brace, in a 2–1 win over Koper. After missing out for one match, he scored again on 2 December 2015, in a 2–1 win over Zavrč.

After making 22 appearances and scoring 9 times for the side, Henty was linked a move away from Olimpija Ljubljana in the January transfer window. As a result, the club began a contract negotiations with Henty, which they claimed the agreement is made in December 2015. Henty, himself, wanted to stay at the club to help the club win the league. However, the club accepted a bid from two Russian teams for €5.5 million, which is believed to be a record-breaking transfer for the club. After the move, Henty reflected on his departure, stating he stand by his decision.

=== Lokomotiv Moscow ===
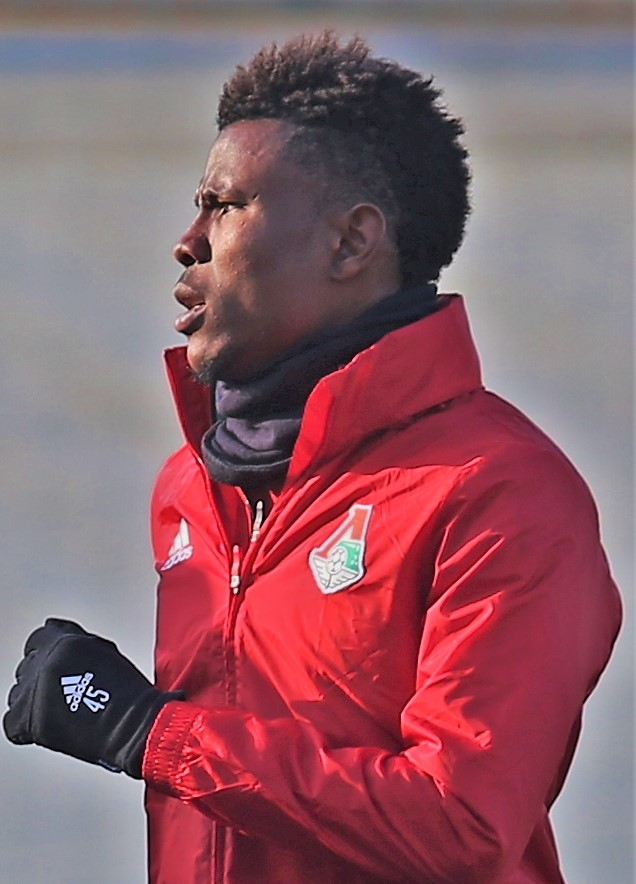
Henty training for Lokomotiv Moscow shortly after joining in February 2016.

It was confirmed on 19 February 2016 that Henty joined Lokomotiv Moscow for €5.5 million, confirming a record-breaking transfer. Upon joining the club, Henty was given number 45 shirt instead of 10 shirt, which he initially opted for.

Henty made his Lokomotiv Moscow debut on 6 March 2016, where he came on as a second-half substitute, in a 2–1 loss against Terek Grozny. After making his debut for the club, Henty said his target was to score 7–8 goals in ten matches. However, his time at Lokomotiv Moscow throughout the rest of the season was a disappointment, due to his failure to score goals as he did at Olimpija Ljubljana earlier this season despite being given more time to adapt at Russia. Despite making 10 appearances at the end of the 2015–16 season, Henty managed to redeem himself when he set up a goal for Petar Škuletić, in a 3–0 win over Mordovia Saransk in the last game of the season.

In the 2016–17 season, Henty continued to feature in the first team despite being on the substitute bench at the start of the season. He then scored his first goal for the club, in a 2–1 win over Krasnodar on 28 August 2016. However, Henty continued to struggled in the first team and scoring goals, due to competitions from Aleksei Miranchuk and Maicon Marques. As a result, he was expected to leave the club in January over poor performance and his first team opportunities had become difficult for him to come by.

==== Baniyas SC (loan) ====
It was announced on 16 January 2017 that Henty would be loaned out to UAE Arabian Gulf League side Baniyas for the rest of the season. The move also included an option to sign Henty on a permanent basis.

Henty made his Baniyas SC debut five days later on 21 January 2017 after signing for the club, starting the whole game, in a 4–3 loss against Dibba Al-Fujairah. It wasn't until on 3 March 2017 when he scored his first goal for the club, as well as, setting another goal, in a 4–3 loss against Al-Wasl. Six days later, on 9 March 2017, Henty scored twice, in a 6–2 loss against Al Wahda. After adding two more goals, the club was unsuccessful to survive in the league.

At the end of the 2016–17 season, making 12 appearances and scoring five times for the side, Henty returned to his parent club.

=== Videoton ===
It was reported on 19 July 2017 that Henty moved to Hungarian side Videoton, signing a three-year contract. The fee was reported to be €1 million.

Henty made his Videoton debut on 30 July 2017, starting the whole game, in a 2–2 draw against Újpest. He then scored his first goal for the club in a follow-up match on 6 August 2017, in a 2–0 win over Mezőkövesdi. Since joining the club, Henty quickly became the club's fan favourite, where he gave a shirt to a fan after the match. Between 21 October 2017 and 4 November 2017, he scored three goals in three matches against Puskás Akadémia, Újpest (in which he scored just 25 seconds into the match) and Mezőkövesdi. After the match against Újpest, Henty was subjected of racism from Újpest supporters following the end of the match. As a result, Újpest was fined for their role of racially abuse Henty.

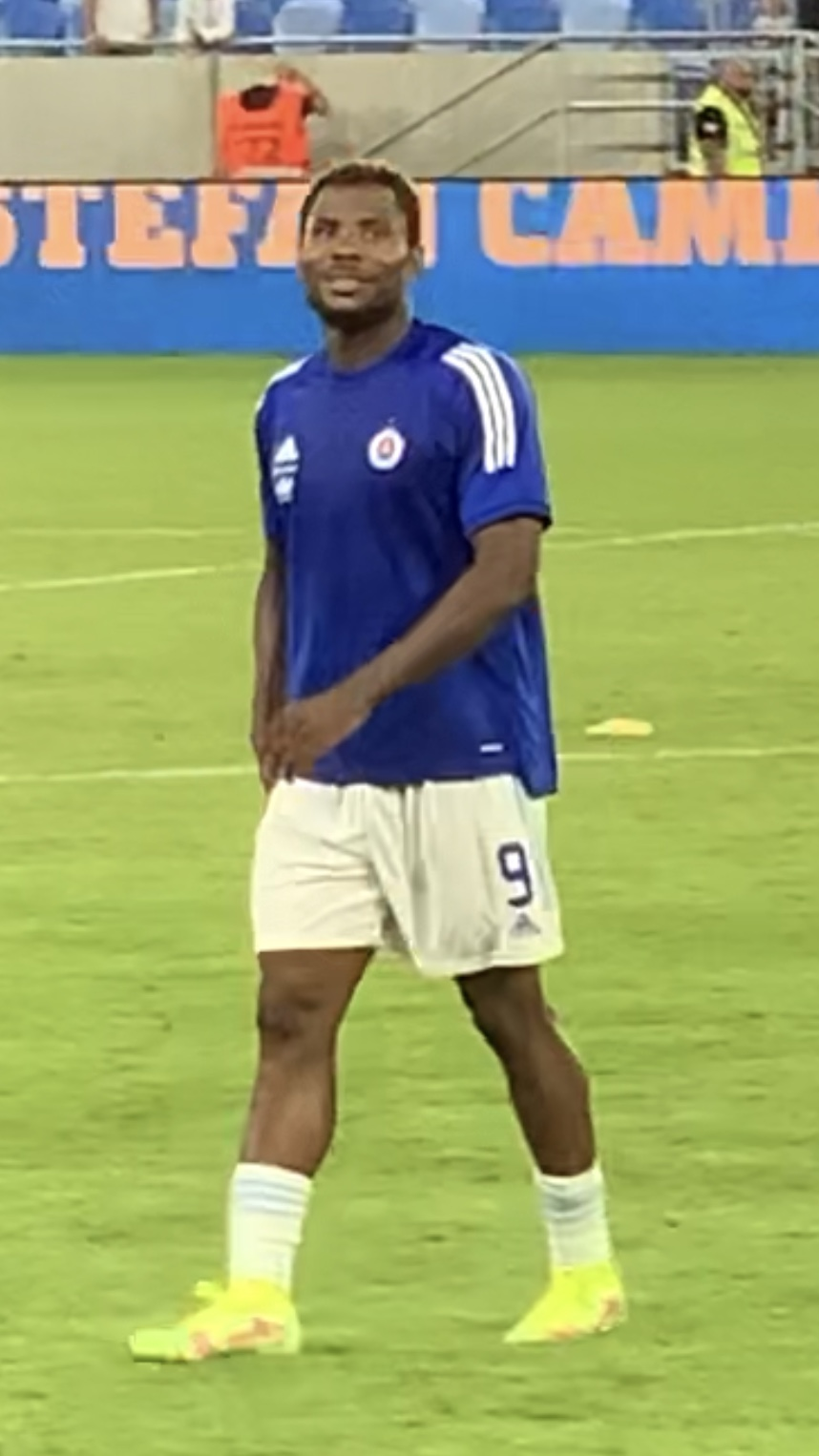
Ezekiel Henty with Slovan Bratislava (2021)

=== Slovan Bratislava ===
On 24 January 2020, it was announced that Henty had reached an agreement on a permanent transfer with reigning Slovak champions, Slovan Bratislava. His transfer was understood as a replacement for departing Andraž Šporar, who had left for Sporting CP earlier.

On 11 August 2022, Henty joined Apollon Limassol in Cyprus on a season-long loan with an option to buy.

After the end of his loan spell at Apollon Limassol, he returned to Slovan Bratislava.

=== Apollon Limassol ===
Henty joined Apollon Limassol on a season-long loan on 11 August 2022. After 24 league appearances and 2 goals with the team, he returned to Slovan Bratislava at the end of the 2022–23 Cypriot First Division.

=== AEL Limassol ===
On 25 August 2023, Henty signed for AEL Limassol on a free transfer after terminating his contract with Slovan Bratislava. Rumors have been going around for the whole August and the player was seen training with the team before the official announcement of the transfer was made.

He missed the first game of the 2023–24 Cypriot First Division but AEL Limassol managed to win away against Doxa Katokopias with 1-0.

On 27 August 2023, he scored his first goal on his first appearance with the team in a win over AEZ Zakakiou with a score of 4-3 after coming from behind (AEZ was up 2-0 at the early stages of the game).

On 2 September 2023 he scored his second goal for the team from the penalty spot, on his second game, in an awat defeat with 3-1 against Pafos FC in Paphos.

== Club statistics ==
As of match played 1 June 2024

Club	Season	League		Cup		Europe		Total	
Club	Season	Apps	Goals	Apps	Goals	Apps	Goals	Apps	Goals
Spezia
Spezia	2013–14	6	1	0	0	—	—	6	1
Spezia	Total	6	1	0	0	—	—	6	1
Perugia
Perugia	2013–14	10	1	0	0	—	—	10	1
Perugia	Total	10	1	0	0	—	—	10	1
Gorica
Gorica	2014–15	10	2	3	1	—	—	13	3
Gorica	Total	10	2	3	1	—	—	13	3
Olimpija Ljubljana
Olimpija Ljubljana	2014–15	14	4	0	0	—	—	14	4
Olimpija Ljubljana	2015–16	21	8	3	2	—	—	24	10
Olimpija Ljubljana	Total	35	12	3	2	—	—	38	14
Lokomotiv Moscow
Lokomotiv Moscow	2015–16	10	0	0	0	—	—	10	0
Lokomotiv Moscow	2016–17	7	1	2	0	—	—	9	1
Lokomotiv Moscow	Total	17	1	2	0	-	-	19	1
Baniyas
Baniyas	2016–17	12	5	0	0	-	-	12	5
Baniyas	Total	12	5	0	0	-	-	12	5
Videoton
Videoton	2017–18	15	5	1	0	4	0	20	5
Videoton	Total	15	5	1	0	4	0	20	5
Osijek
Osijek	2018–19	17	4	2	1	3	0	22	5
Osijek	Total	17	4	2	1	3	0	22	5
Puskás Akadémia
Puskás Akadémia	2017–18	11	3	6	3	-	-	17	6
Puskás Akadémia	2019–20	12	7	1	0	-	-	13	7
Puskás Akadémia	Total	23	10	7	3	0	0	30	13
Slovan Bratislava
Slovan Bratislava	2020-21	15	3	6	4	-	-	21	7
Slovan Bratislava	2021-22	18	9	2	0	14	5	34	14
Slovan Bratislava	Total	33	12	8	4	14	5	55	21
Apollon Limassol
Apollon Limassol	2022-23	24	2	1	-	7	-	32	2
Apollon Limassol	Total	24	2	1	-	7	-	32	2
AEL Limassol
AEL Limassol	2023-24	2	2	-	-	-	-	2	2
AEL Limassol	Total	2	2	-	-	-	-	2	2
F.C. Ashdod
F.C. Ashdod	2023–24	14	4	1	0	0	0	15	4
F.C. Ashdod	Total	14	4	1	0	0	0	15	4
Maccabi Bnei Reineh
Maccabi Bnei Reineh	2024–25	0	0	0	0	0	0	0	0
Maccabi Bnei Reineh	Total	0	0	0	0	0	0	0	0
Career Total		218	61	27	11	29	5	274	77

== Personal life ==
Growing up, Henty said he idolised George Weah. Henty revealed that he wasn't interested in football at first, preferring to focus on his education. This all changed when his mother, who is a football fan, convinced him to play football, having bought him footwear and equipment, which changed his passion.

Henty speaks English, Italian, and some Russian. He has also revealed that he would accept a Slovenian citizenship if he was offered.

== Honours ==
Slovan Bratislava

- Fortuna Liga (2): 2019–20, 2020–21
- Slovnaft Cup (2): 2019–20, 2020–21
