= Mikuláš Bakaľa =

Slovak footballer

Personal information
- Date of birth: 4 January 2001 (age 25)
- Place of birth: Dolný Kubín, Slovakia
- Height: 1.87 m (6 ft 2 in)
- Position: Defensive midfielder

Team information
- Current team: Dukla Banská Bystrica
- Number: 23

Youth career
- –2015: Námestovo
- 2015–2018: Železiarne Podbrezová

Senior career*
| Years | Team | Apps | (Gls) |
| 2018–2024 | Železiarne Podbrezová | 117 | (5) |
| 2024–2025 | Den Bosch | 34 | (2) |
| 2025–2026 | Polonia Bytom | 17 | (0) |
| 2026– | Dukla Banská Bystrica | 8 | (0) |

International career
| 2022 | Slovakia U21 | 1 | (0) |
- * Club domestic league appearances and goals as of 21 September 2026

Mikuláš Bakaľa (born 4 January 2001) is a Slovak professional footballer who plays as a defensive midfielder for Slovak club Dukla Banská Bystrica.

== Club career ==
=== Železiarne Podbrezová ===
Bakaľa made his professional debut for Železiarne Podbrezová against Slovan Bratislava on 16 July 2022.

== International career ==
Bakaľa was first recognised with a Slovak senior national team nomination in November 2022 by Francesco Calzona, being listed as an alternate for two friendly fixtures against Montenegro and Marek Hamšík's retirement match against Chile. He remained in the position of an alternate for prospective national team players' training camp in early December.
