= Juraj Ančic =

Slovak international football midfielder (born 1981)

Personal information
- Full name: Juraj Ančic
- Date of birth: 12 July 1981 (age 45)
- Place of birth: Trenčín, Czechoslovakia
- Height: 1.83 m (6 ft 0 in)
- Position: Midfielder

Team information
- Current team: Šamorín (manager)

Youth career
- 1992–1996: TTS Trenčín
- 1996–1998: Dukla Ozeta Trenčín

Senior career*
Years	Team	Apps	(Gls)
1998–2002	Dukla Ozeta Trenčín	69	(5)
2002–2007	FC Slovan Liberec	75	(2)
2007	→ Sparta Prague (loan)	3	(0)
2007–2008	MŠK Žilina	8	(0)
2008–2009	FK AS Trenčín		
2009	Spartak Bánovce		
2010	Slovan Duslo Šaľa		
2011	Kyjov 1919		

International career^{‡}
2001	Slovakia U-21	8	(0)
2002	Slovakia	1	(0)

Managerial career
- 2012–2018: AS Trenčín (assistant)
- 2018: AS Trenčín (assistant)
- 2019: Inter Bratislava (assistant)
- 2020-: AS Trenčín (assistant)
- 2021: AS Trenčín (caretaker)
- 2022: AS Trenčín
- 2023–: Šamorín
- * Club domestic league appearances and goals as of 13 October 2009 ‡ National team caps and goals as of 13 October 2009

Juraj Ančic (born 12 July 1981) is a Slovak international football midfielder who played for clubs in the Czech Republic and Slovakia. He is currently manager of Šamorín.

== Career ==
Born in Trenčín, Ančic began playing football for the youth side of TTS Trenčín. He signed his first professional contract with Dukla Ozeta Trenčín.

Ančic joined Czech Gambrinus liga side FC Slovan Liberec in 2002. He was unable to work his way into Slovan's starting squad on a regular basis and went on a six-month loan to Sparta Prague in January 2007. In the summer of 2007, he moved on to MŠK Žilina.

After a short spell with Žilina, he joined AS Trenčín in late 2008. He left the club in the summer 2009 and spent the fall at Spartak Bánovce. In 2011 he joined FC Kyjov 1919.

== Coaching career ==
In the beginning of January 2012, Ančic was hired at AS Trenčín as a youth coach. On 29 January 2018, Ančic was promoted to the first team assistant manager under head manager Vladimír Cifranič. He worked in this position for a year, before joining Inter Bratislava also as an assistant manager. Ančic actually switched position with Richard Slezák, who worked for Inter Bratislava and joined AS Trenčín as an assistant manager, while Ančic took his position at Inter Bratislava.

In January 2022, Ančic entered his third managerial spell at Trenčín, but only lasted half-season and was replaced by Peter Hyballa ahead of the new 2022–23 season. His spell was commented on in the media as largely successful, exhibiting dominance in the Relegation Group, while also supporting players like Adam Tučný, Dominik Hollý or Philip Azango in their development. It was also noted, that club advisor Ivan Galád did not support Ančic's continuation at the club.
