= František Šturma =

Czech football manager (born 1972)

Personal information
- Date of birth: 7 August 1972 (age 54)
- Place of birth: Nymburk, Czechoslovakia

Managerial career
- Years: Team
- 2002–2003: AFK Semice
- 2002–2003: Mladá Boleslav (youth)
- 2007–2009: Slovan Liberec (youths and seniors)
- 2009–2010: Viktoria Žižkov (assistant)
- 2010–2011: Zemplín Michalovce (assistant)
- 2011–2012: Arsenal Česká Lípa
- 2012–2013: Bohemians 1905 (youths)
- 2013–2014: MAS Táborsko (assistant)
- 2014–2015: Zemplín Michalovce
- 2016: Benátky nad Jizerou
- 2016–2017: Poprad
- 2019: Kolín
- 2019: Znojmo
- 2019: Baník Sokolov
- 2020–2021: Sereď
- 2021–2022: Chlumec nad Cidlinou
- 2022–2023: Dvůr Králové
- 2024–2025: Chlumec nad Cidlinou
- 2025–2026: Považská Bystrica

František Šturma (born 7 August 1972) is a Czech professional football manager and former player who was most recently the manager of Slovak club Považská Bystrica.

== Honours ==
=== Manager ===
Zemplín Michalovce

- DOXXbet liga: 2014–15
