= Dawid Kurminowski =

Polish footballer (born 1999)

Personal information
- Full name: Dawid Kurminowski
- Date of birth: 24 February 1999 (age 27)
- Place of birth: Śrem, Poland
- Height: 1.81 m (5 ft 11 in)
- Position: Forward

Team information
- Current team: Kalamata
- Number: 91

Youth career
- 2004–2005: Kotwica Kórnik
- 2005–2013: Warta Poznań
- 2013–2015: Lech Poznań

Senior career*
Years	Team	Apps	(Gls)
2015–2019	Lech Poznań II	48	(19)
2018	→ Zemplín Michalovce (loan)	23	(5)
2019–2021	→ Žilina B (loan)	25	(16)
2019	→ Žilina (loan)	4	(0)
2020–2021	Žilina	48	(25)
2021–2023	AGF	29	(2)
2022–2023	→ Zagłębie Lubin (loan)	14	(4)
2023–2025	Zagłębie Lubin	53	(16)
2025–2026	Lechia Gdańsk	23	(3)
2026–	Kalamata	5	(5)

International career
2014–2015	Poland U16	5	(1)
2015–2016	Poland U17	4	(2)
2016–2017	Poland U18	9	(3)
2017	Poland U19	2	(0)
2019	Poland U20	6	(2)
2020	Poland U21	2	(0)
- * Club domestic league appearances and goals as of 20:18, 2 November 2026 (UTC)

Dawid Kurminowski (born 24 February 1999) is a Polish professional footballer who plays as a forward for Super League Greece club Kalamata.

In the 2020–21 season, he became the top scorer of Slovak Super Liga with 19 goals.

== Club career ==
=== Zemplín Michalovce ===
Kurminowski made his Fortuna Liga debut for Zemplín Michalovce against DAC Dunajská Streda on 24 February 2018. Kurminowski replaced Sadam Sulley in the second half, when Michalovce were one goal down. In stoppage time, Christián Herc connected to set the final score to 2–0 for DAC.

=== AGF ===
On 12 August 2021, Kurminowski signed a five-year contract with Danish Superliga club AGF.

=== Zagłębie Lubin ===
On 1 September 2022, he joined Ekstraklasa side Zagłębie Lubin on a season-long loan, with an option to make the move permanent. Marred by injuries, Kurminowski made only one appearance in the first half of the season, but established himself as a starter following the winter break. On 31 May 2023, Zagłębie exercised their option and signed Kurminowski on a two-year deal. On 24 December 2024, he extended his contract until the end of June 2027.

=== Lechia Gdańsk ===
On 17 July 2025, Kurminowski moved to Lechia Gdańsk on a three-year deal for a reported fee of €500,000. On 23 June 2026, Lechia announced they had exercised their right to terminate Kurminowski's contract in the wake of relegation to the I liga.

=== Kalamata ===
On 5 August 2026, Kurminowski agreed to join Super League Greece newcomers Kalamata.

== Personal life ==
Kurminowski is fluent in Polish and Slovak.

== Honours ==
Individual

- Slovak Super Liga top scorer: 2020–21
- Slovak Super Liga U-21 Team of the Season: 2020–21
