= Tibor Slebodník =

Slovak footballer (born 2000)

Personal information
- Full name: Tibor Slebodník
- Date of birth: 21 September 2000 (age 26)
- Place of birth: Poprad, Slovakia
- Height: 1.78 m (5 ft 10 in)
- Position: Midfielder

Team information
- Current team: MFK Dukla Banská Bystrica
- Number: 9

Youth career
- 2011–2014: Spišská Nová Ves
- 2014–2018: Tatran Prešov

Senior career*
Years	Team	Apps	(Gls)
2018–2020	Poprad	24	(2)
2020–2023	Žilina B	27	(10)
2021–2023	Žilina	38	(3)
2022–2023	→ Michalovce (loan)	25	(0)
2023–	MFK Dukla Banská Bystrica	79	(13)

International career^{‡}
2021–2023	Slovakia U21	3	(0)
- * Club domestic league appearances and goals as of 21 September 2026 ‡ National team caps and goals as of 4 December 2025

Tibor Slebodník (born 21 September 2000) is a Slovak professional footballer who currently plays for 2. Liga club MFK Dukla Banská Bystrica as a midfielder.

== Club career ==
=== Early career ===
Slebodník comes from the village of Jánovce, located halfway between Poprad and Spišská Nová Ves. He started playing football in the Spiš metropolis, but at the age of 13 he headed to Tatran Presov. From there he transferred to FK Poprad. In 2020, he joined second division side MŠK Žilina B, signing a 2 year-contract.

=== MŠK Žilina ===
Slebodník joined Žilina in 2021, being considered as a big talent. He made his Fortuna Liga debut for Žilina against ViOn Zlaté Moravce on 13 February 2021. He came on in the second half, replacing Miroslav Gono and he netted a goal in the 83rd minute. He scored a 96th minute winner in a 2–1 win against FC Spartak Trnava. At his time with Žilina, Slebodník made 39 first-league starts, and played seven matches in the qualifying rounds of the European Conference League, where he managed to score once against Tobol Kostanaj from Kazakhstan.

=== Banská Bystrica ===
After his stint loan to Zemplín Michalovce, Slebodník joined fellow league outfit FK Dukla Banská Bystrica. He made his league debut for Dukla in a 4–1 loss against FK Železiarne Podbrezová. He scored his first goal for the club in a 4–2 win over AS Trenčín. At the end of the 2025-2026 season, Dukla were relegated to the 2. Liga. Slebodník scored the winning goal in a 1–0 victory against FC Petržalka, scoring in the first half after a mistake by the opposition’s defense. He finished 3rd in the player of the month for the November part of the 2. Liga season.

== Style of play ==
Slebodník has been praised for his professional attitude and control of the ball.

== Career statistics ==
As of 4 December 2025
Club	League	Season	Appearances	Goals
MŠK Žilina	Slovak First League	2020/2021	11	2
MŠK Žilina	Slovak First League	2021/2022	27	0
Zemplin Michalovce (loan)	Slovak First League	2022/2023	23	0
Dukla Banská Bystrica	Slovak First League	2023/2024	20	1
Dukla Banská Bystrica	Slovak First League	2024/2025	24	2
Dukla Banská Bystrica	2. Liga	2025/2026	16	7
