= Miroslav Gono =

Slovak under-21 international footballer

Personal information
- Full name: Miroslav Gono
- Date of birth: 1 November 2000 (age 26)
- Place of birth: Piešťany, Slovakia
- Height: 1.81 m (5 ft 11 in)
- Position: Midfielder

Team information
- Current team: Zvolen
- Number: 10

Youth career
- 2008–2012: Piešťany
- 2012: Nitra
- 2014–2015: Vrbové
- 2016: Spartak Trnava
- 2016–2018: AS Trenčín
- 2018–2019: Žilina

Senior career*
| Years | Team | Apps | (Gls) |
| 2018–2022 | Žilina B | 27 | (1) |
| 2020–2023 | Žilina | 62 | (0) |
| 2022–2023 | → Wisła Płock (loan) | 4 | (0) |
| 2023–2025 | Zlaté Moravce | 53 | (2) |
| 2025– | Zvolen | 26 | (2) |

International career
| 2017–2018 | Slovakia U18 | 2 | (0) |
| 2018 | Slovakia U19 | 5 | (1) |
| 2020–2021 | Slovakia U21 | 13 | (1) |
- * Club domestic league appearances and goals as of 17 May 2026

Miroslav Gono (born 1 November 2000) is a Slovak professional footballer who plays as a midfielder for 2. Liga club Zvolen.

== Club career ==
=== MŠK Žilina ===
Gono made his Fortuna Liga debut for Žilina against iClinic Sereď at pod Zoborom on 7 March 2020. He came on as a replacement for Enis Fazlagikj, spending over 20 minutes on the pitch, with final score already set at 0:3 for Šošoni.

==== Loan to Wisła Płock ====
On 2 September 2022, he joined Polish side Wisła Płock on a season-long loan, reuniting with his former manager Pavol Staňo.

=== Zlaté Moravce ===
Shortly after returning from loan, on 26 June 2023 Gono signed a two-year deal with FC ViOn Zlaté Moravce.
