= Benson Anang =

Ghanaian professional footballer

Personal information
- Full name: Benson Anang
- Date of birth: 1 May 2000 (age 26)
- Place of birth: Ghana
- Height: 1.72 m (5 ft 8 in)
- Position: Right back

Team information
- Current team: Akritas Chlorakas
- Number: 82

Youth career
- New Life Academy
- 2018: Žilina Africa
- 2018–2019: Žilina

Senior career*
| Years | Team | Apps | (Gls) |
| 2018–2023 | Žilina | 76 | (3) |
| 2019–2021 | → Žilina B (loan) | 19 | (1) |
| 2023–2024 | Othellos Athienou | 35 | (0) |
| 2024–2025 | Dinamo Tbilisi | 18 | (0) |
| 2025– | Akritas Chlorakas | 23 | (0) |

International career^{‡}
| 2020– | Ghana | 3 | (0) |
- * Club domestic league appearances and goals as of 14 June 2026 ‡ National team caps and goals as of 7 June 2021

Benson Anang (born 1 May 2000) is a Ghanaian professional footballer who plays as a defender for Cypriot club Akritas Chlorakas.

== Club career ==
=== MŠK Žilina ===
Anang made his Fortuna Liga debut for Žilina against Nitra on 28 July 2018. Anang completed 90 minutes of the match, playing as a right back. Žilina won the game 2–1.

== International career ==
Anang made his professional debut with the Ghana national team in a friendly 5–1 win over Qatar on 12 October 2020. He played the entirety of the match.
