= Kristián Vallo =

Slovak footballer

Personal information
- Full name: Kristián Vallo
- Date of birth: 2 June 1998 (age 28)
- Place of birth: Žilina, Slovakia
- Height: 1.86 m (6 ft 1 in)
- Position: Right-back

Team information
- Current team: Dukla Banská Bystrica
- Number: 11

Youth career
- 2011–2017: Žilina

Senior career*
Years	Team	Apps	(Gls)
2015–2019	Žilina B	75	(13)
2016–2021	Žilina	74	(4)
2021	→ Wisła Płock (loan)	8	(0)
2021–2024	Wisła Płock	56	(3)
2024–2026	Karviná	23	(2)
2026–	Dukla Banská Bystrica	0	(0)

International career
2015–2016	Slovakia U18	6	(0)
2016–2017	Slovakia U19	9	(2)
2018	Slovakia U20	1	(0)
2019–2020	Slovakia U21	8	(1)
2022	Slovakia	2	(0)
- * Club domestic league appearances and goals as of 11:32, 16 June 2026 (UTC)

Kristián Vallo (born 2 June 1998) is a Slovak professional footballer who plays as a right-back for Slovak First Football League club Dukla Banská Bystrica. After starting his club career in Slovakia, he spent four years in Poland before moving to Karviná in 2024.

== Club career ==
=== MŠK Žilina ===
He made his Fortuna Liga debut for Žilina against Zemplín Michalovce on 4 March 2016. He made his debut by replacing Jakub Michlík four minutes before stoppage time. Žilina lost 2–3.

=== MFK Karviná ===
Vallo spent four seasons in Poland before joining Czech First League club Karviná on 18 September 2024. He scored his first league goal for the club in a 2–1 away loss against Baník Ostrava in November 2004, with a left-footed strike which opened the scoring.

== International career ==
Vallo was first recognised in a senior national team nomination on 16 March 2022 by Štefan Tarkovič as an alternate defender ahead of two international friendly fixtures against Norway and Finland. When Francesco Calzona took over from Tarkovič in the summer of 2022, Vallo was called up for two September 2022–23 UEFA Nations League C fixtures. He made his debut on 22 September 2022 at Štadión Antona Malatinského in a fixture against Azerbaijan, which concluded in an upsetting 1–2 defeat following a stoppage time drama. Vallo completed the entirety of the match. In a subsequent match against Belarus, Vallo remained benched. He was also nominated for November friendlies against Montenegro and Chile, suffering an injury in the first match, as well as prospective player's training camp at NTC Senec in December.

== Honours ==
Žilina

- Slovak First Football League: 2016–17

Karviná

- Czech Cup: 2025–26
