= FK Svit =

Slovak football club

- Full name: FK Svit
- Founded: 1936; 89 years ago
- Ground: Štadión Svit, Svit
- Chairman: Peter Ferjanček
- Manager: Ján Kleščík
- League: 3. liga
- 2015–16 4. Liga: 1st (promoted)
- Website: http://fksvit.tym.sk/

FK Svit is a Slovak football team, based in the town of Svit. The club was founded in 1936.
