= Matúš Rusnák =

Slovak footballer (born 1999)

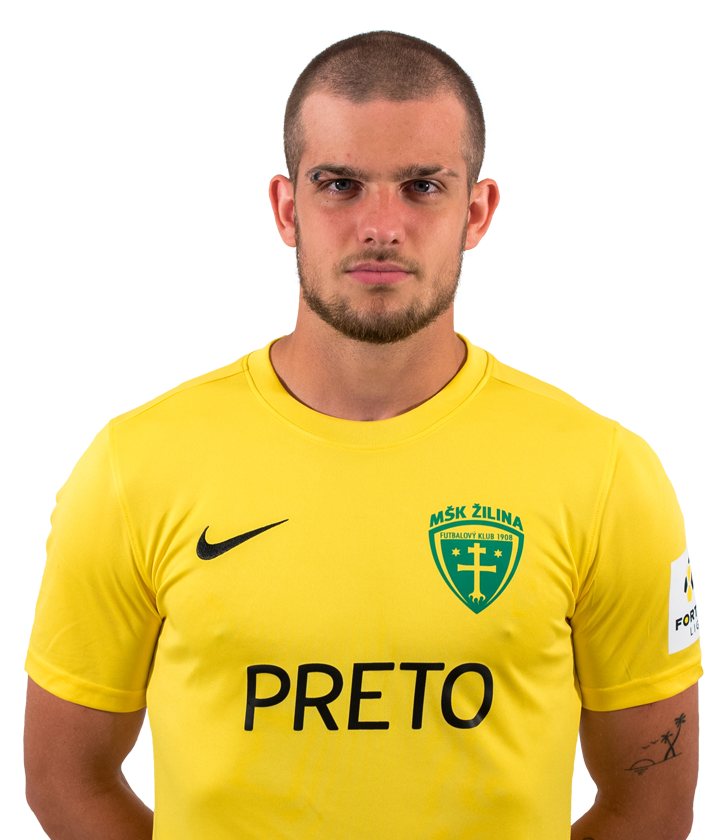
- Official portrait at MŠK Žilina

Personal information
- Full name: Matúš Rusnák
- Date of birth: 19 December 1999 (age 26)
- Place of birth: Levice, Slovakia
- Height: 1.80 m (5 ft 11 in)
- Positions: Right winger; right back

Team information
- Current team: Železiarne Podbrezová (on loan from Baník Ostrava)
- Number: 66

Youth career
- 2009–2013: KŠK Juventus Levice
- 2013: Slovan Levice
- 2014: KŠK Juventus Levice
- 2014−2015: Slovan Levice
- 2015−2018: AS Trenčín
- 2019: Žilina

Senior career*
Years	Team	Apps	(Gls)
2018–2021	Žilina B	44	(4)
2020–2023	Žilina	107	(5)
2024–	Baník Ostrava	48	(1)
2026–	→ Železiarne Podbrezová (loan)	4	(0)
- * Club domestic league appearances and goals as of 21 September 2026

Matúš Rusnák (born 19 December 1999) is a Slovak professional footballer who currently plays for Železiarne Podbrezová on loan from Baník Ostrava.

== Club career ==
=== MŠK Žilina ===
Rusnák made his Fortuna Liga debut for Žilina at OMS Arena against Senica on 8 August 2020. He came on in the 76th minute to replace Dávid Ďuriš with Žilina already two up following goals by Ďuriš and Jakub Paur. While on pitch, he witnessed two further goals by Vahan Bichakhchyan, cementing Žilina's 0:4 win in the first round fixture. By the end of the year, he had appeared in all 18 season's league fixtures of Žilina.

=== Baník Ostrava ===
On 27 December 2023, it was announced that Rusnák was due to move to Czech First League club Baník Ostrava pending a deal between his club Žilina and the Czech side.

On 23 January 2024, Rusnák signed a three-and-a-half-year contract with Baník Ostrava.

== International career ==
Rusnák was first recognised as an alternate broader squad member for the senior Slovak national team by Štefan Tarkovič on 28 September 2021 ahead of two 2022 FIFA World Cup qualifiers against Russia and Croatia. When Štefan Tarkovič was replaced by Francesco Calzona in the summer of 2022, Rusnák immediately got into the shortlisted 27-man squad although he did not make an appearance in the two fixtures. In November, he also penetrated the 27-man squad although he was initially listed as an alternate, but following Michal Tomič's unavailability he was returned to the team. For December prospective national players' training camp, Rusnák was only listed as an alternate once again.
