= Ján Minárik =

Slovak footballer

Personal information
- Full name: Ján Minárik
- Date of birth: 25 July 1997 (age 29)
- Place of birth: Žilina, Slovakia
- Height: 1.91 m (6 ft 3 in)
- Position: Centre-back

Team information
- Current team: Žilina
- Number: 17

Youth career
- 2008–2016: Žilina
- 2011: → Družstevník Rašov (loan)
- 2011–2012: → FO Kinex Bytča (loan)

Senior career*
Years	Team	Apps	(Gls)
2015–2021	Žilina B	62	(5)
2016–	Žilina	158	(9)
- * Club domestic league appearances and goals as of 21 September 2026

Ján Minárik (born 25 July 1997) is a Slovak professional footballer who plays for Niké Liga club MŠK Žilina as a centre-back.

== Club career ==
=== MŠK Žilina ===
Minárik made his Fortuna Liga debut for Žilina in an away match at OMS Aréna against Senica on 23 February 2019. Minárik had played the full game as Šošoni recorded a narrow 1–0 victory, thanks to a free-kick goal by Michal Tomič.

== Honours ==
Žilina

- Slovak Cup: 2025–26
