= Dávid Ďuriš =

Slovak footballer (born 1999)

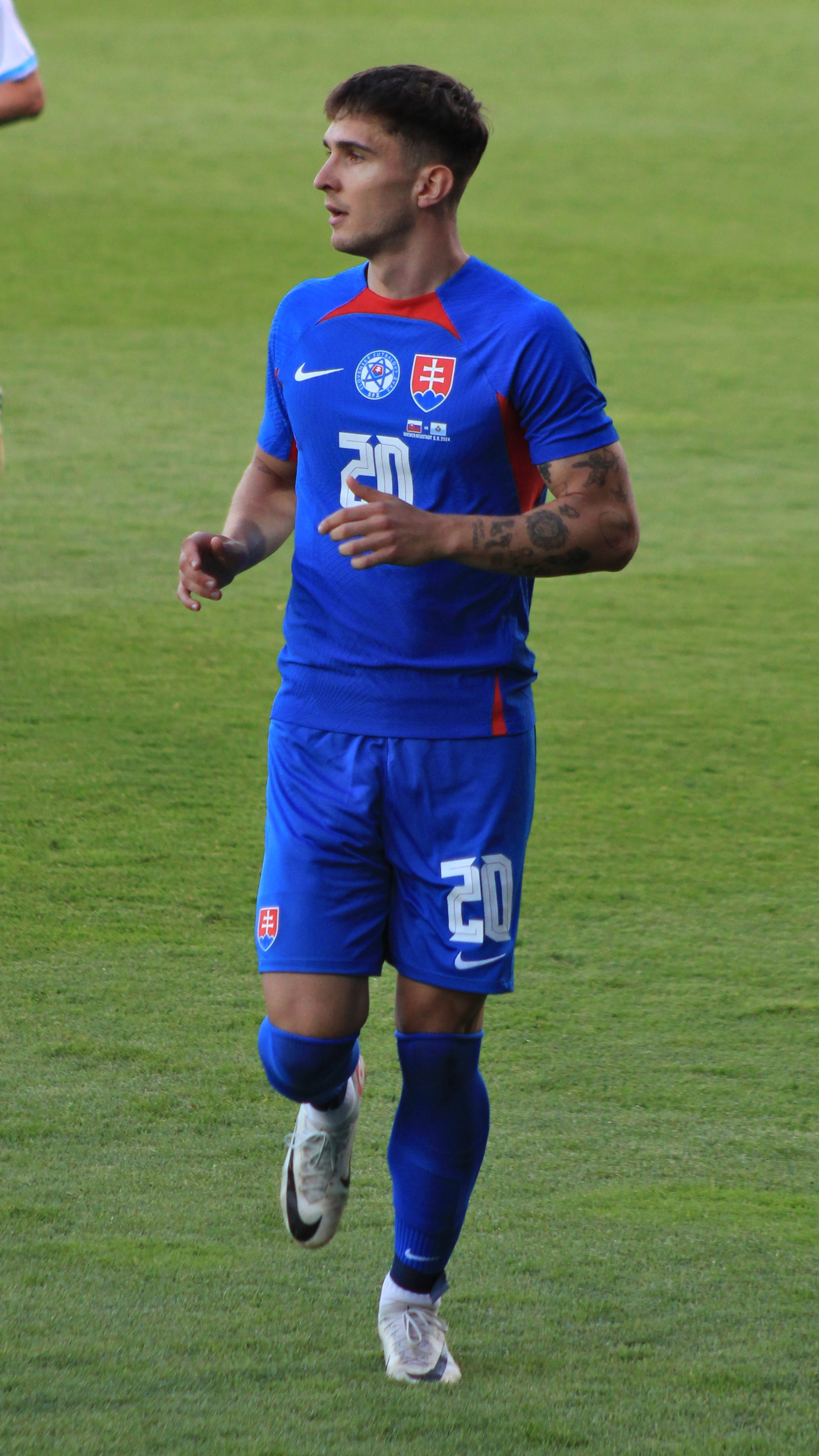
- Ďuriš playing for Slovakia in 2024

Personal information
- Date of birth: 22 March 1999 (age 27)
- Place of birth: Žilina, Slovakia
- Height: 1.86 m (6 ft 1 in)
- Position: Forward

Team information
- Current team: Rosenborg
- Number: 29

Youth career
- 2006–2018: Žilina

Senior career*
Years	Team	Apps	(Gls)
2017–2021	Žilina B	44	(8)
2018–2025	Žilina	167	(47)
2024	→ Ascoli (loan)	11	(2)
2025–	Rosenborg	29	(3)

International career^{‡}
2019–2020	Slovakia U21	7	(0)
2022–	Slovakia	28	(2)
- * Club domestic league appearances and goals as of 22 November 2026 ‡ National team caps and goals as of 4 October 2026

Dávid Ďuriš (born 22 March 1999) is a Slovak professional footballer who plays as a forward for Norwegian club Rosenborg in the Eliteserien.

== Club career ==
=== MŠK Žilina ===
Ďuriš made his Fortuna Liga debut for Žilina against Zemplín Michalovce on 20 July 2019.

==== Loan to Ascoli ====
On 31 January 2024, Ďuriš joined Ascoli in Italian Serie B on loan with an option to buy. Ďuriš collected eleven appearances for the club, five of which were in the starting line-up. Despite Ďuriš's two goals, Ascoli was relegated at the end of the season to 2024–25 Serie C - Ďuriš scored in his third league appearance against Sampdoria and fourth appearance versus Lecco respectively.

=== Rosenborg ===
On 6 August 2025, Ďuriš signed for Rosenborg on a contract until the end of 2029. At Rosenborg he was reunited with fellow Slovak and former Žilina player Tomáš Nemčík.

== International career ==
Ďuriš was first called up to Slovak senior national team nomination in premier nomination by Francesco Calzona in September 2022 for 2022–23 UEFA Nations League fixtures, repeating the recognition in same position ahead of November friendlies. He debuted for the national team on 22 September 2022 at against Azerbaijan, replacing Matúš Bero in the 83rd minute with Slovaks trailing 1–0 and lost 2–1 after two further goals by Erik Jirka and Hojjat Haghverdi.

== Career statistics ==
=== Club ===
As of match played 22 November 2026

Appearances and goals by club, season and competition
Club	Season	League			National cup (Note: Includes Slovak Cup, Norwegian Cup)		Europe		Other		Total	
Club	Season	Division	Apps	Goals	Apps	Goals	Apps	Goals	Apps	Goals	Apps	Goals
Žilina B	2017–18	2. Liga	4	0	—		—		—		4	0
Žilina B	2018–19	2. Liga	30	4	—		—		—		30	4
Žilina B	2019–20	2. Liga	5	2	—		—		—		5	2
Žilina B	2020–21	2. Liga	4	2	—		—		—		4	2
Žilina B	2021–22	2. Liga	1	0	—		—		—		1	0
Žilina B	Total		44	8	—		—		—		44	8
Žilina	2018–19	Slovak First Football League	0	0	1	1	—		—		1	1
Žilina	2019–20	Slovak First Football League	23	6	3	0	—		—		25	6
Žilina	2020–21	Slovak First Football League	31	8	6	2	1 (Note: Appearance in UEFA Europa League)	0	—		38	10
Žilina	2021–22	Slovak First Football League	30	5	5	1	8 (Note: Appearances in UEFA Conference League)	4	—		43	10
Žilina	2022–23	Slovak First Football League	31	9	3	1	—		1 (Note: Appearance in European play-offs)	0	35	10
Žilina	2023–24	Slovak First Football League	18	9	1	1	4	1	—		23	11
Žilina	2024–25	Slovak First Football League	32	10	4	2	—		—		36	12
Žilina	2025–26	Slovak First Football League	2	0	0	0	2	1	—		4	1
Žilina	Total		167	47	23	8	15	6	1	0	206	61
Ascoli (loan)	2023–24	Serie B	11	2	—		—		—		11	2
Rosenborg	2025	Eliteserien	10	2	1	0	—		—		11	2
Rosenborg	2026	Eliteserien	19	1	2	0	—		—		21	1
Rosenborg	Total		29	3	3	0	—		—		32	3
Career total			251	62	26	8	15	6	1	0	293	76

=== International ===
As of match played 2 October 2026

Appearances and goals by national team and year
National team	Year	Apps	Goals
Slovakia	2022	3	0
Slovakia	2023	6	1
Slovakia	2024	9	1
Slovakia	2025	8	0
2026	2	0	
Total		28	2

Scores and results list Slovakia's goal tally first, score column indicates score after each Ďuriš goal.

List of international goals scored by Dávid Ďuriš
No.	Date	Venue	Opponent	Score	Result	Competition
1	16 October 2023	Stade de Luxembourg, Gasperich, Luxembourg	Luxembourg	1–0	1–0	UEFA Euro 2024 qualifying
2	14 October 2024	Tofiq Bahramov Republican Stadium, Baku, Azerbaijan	Azerbaijan	3–1	3–1	2024–25 UEFA Nations League C

== Honours ==
Individual

- Slovak Super Liga U21 Team of the Season: 2020–21
