= Vahan Bichakhchyan =

Armenian footballer

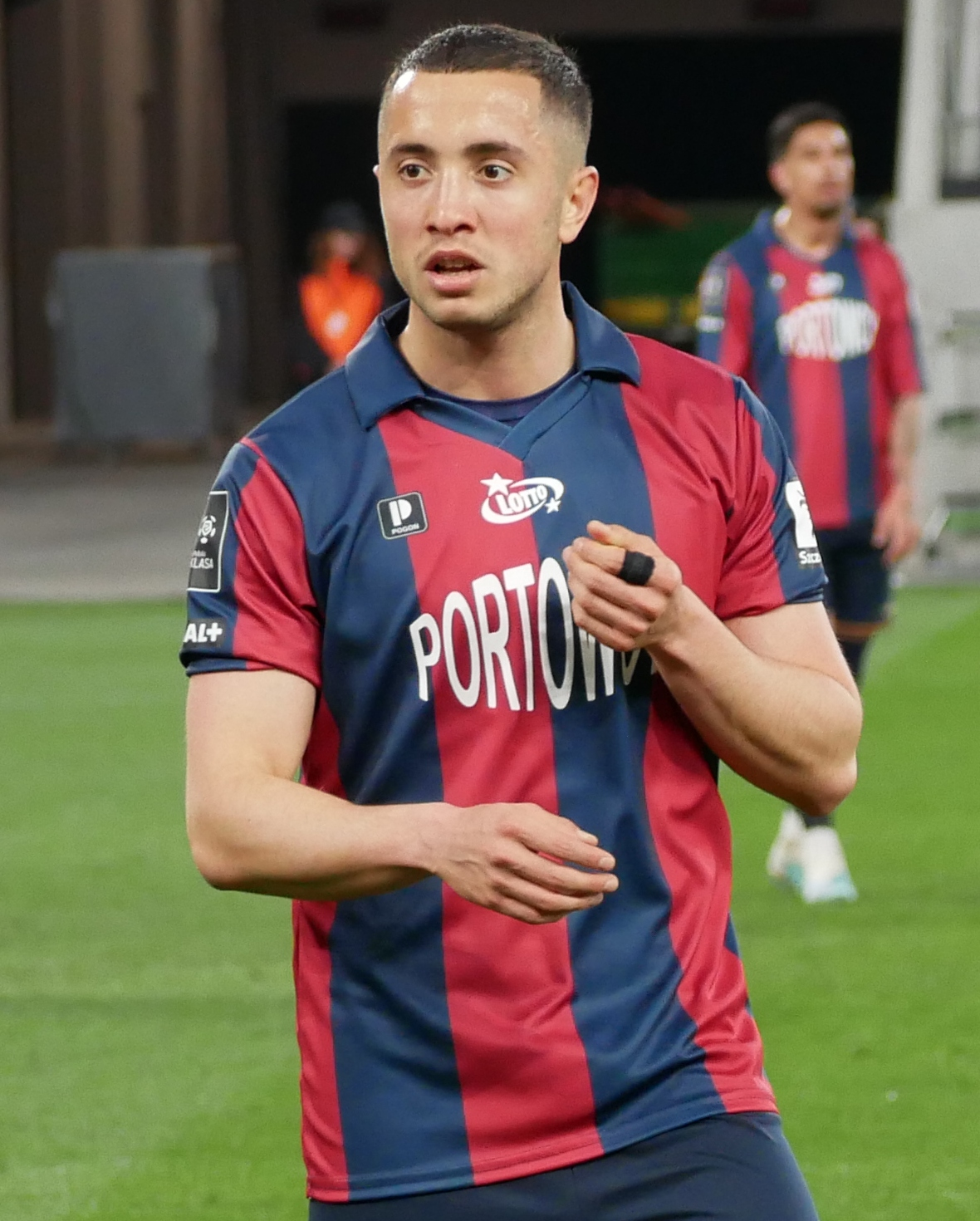
- Bichakhchyan with Pogoń Szczecin in 2023

Personal information
- Full name: Vahan Vardani Bichakhchyan
- Date of birth: 9 July 1999 (age 27)
- Place of birth: Gyumri, Armenia
- Height: 1.72 m (5 ft 8 in)
- Position: Attacking midfielder

Team information
- Current team: Legia Warsaw
- Number: 21

Youth career
- Shirak Gyumri

Senior career*
Years	Team	Apps	(Gls)
2015–2017	Shirak Gyumri	24	(4)
2017–2022	Žilina	62	(18)
2022–2025	Pogoń Szczecin	95	(15)
2025–	Legia Warsaw	35	(3)

International career^{‡}
2016–2017	Armenia U19	18	(6)
2017–2021	Armenia U21	13	(1)
2020–	Armenia	47	(6)
- * Club domestic league appearances and goals as of 08:45, 9 November 2026 (UTC) ‡ National team caps and goals as of 17:21, 29 March 2026 (UTC)

Vahan Bichakhchyan (Armenian: Վահան Բիչախչյան; born 9 July 1999) is an Armenian professional footballer who plays as an attacking midfielder for Ekstraklasa club Legia Warsaw and the Armenia national team. He is the son of Vardan Bichakhchyan, a former player who most recently managed Ararat Yerevan.

== Club career ==
=== MŠK Žilina ===
In July 2017, Bichakhchyan signed a five-year contract with Žilina. He made his Fortuna Liga debut for Žilina in a 6–0 defeat against Slovan Bratislava on 24 February 2018, replacing Miroslav Káčer eight minutes before the end of the game.

In December 2020, Bichakhchyan polled as Armenia's third best player of the year, behind national team captain and Roma star Henrikh Mkhitaryan and Astana midfielder Tigran Barseghyan.

=== Pogoń Szczecin ===
In January 2022, Pogoń Szczecin announced that they reached an agreement with Žilina for the permanent transfer of Bichakhchyan for a reported fee of €900,000. He signed a three-and-a-half-year contract. He made his debut for Pogoń on 5 February, in a 0–2 away victory over Piast Gliwice, he also scored his first goal there during that match.

=== Legia Warsaw ===
On 16 January 2025, Bichakhchyan signed for another Ekstraklasa club Legia Warsaw on a three-year contract for a reported fee of about €250,000.

== Career statistics ==
=== International ===
As of match played 29 March 2026

Appearances and goals by national team and year
National team	Year	Apps	Goals
Armenia	2020	5	0
Armenia	2021	6	1
Armenia	2022	10	2
Armenia	2023	10	0
Armenia	2024	9	2
Armenia	2025	6	0
Armenia	2026	1	1
Total		47	6

Scores and results list Armenia's goal tally first, score column indicates score after each Bichakhchyan goal.

List of international goals scored by Vahan Bichakhchyan
No.	Date	Venue	Opponent	Score	Result	Competition
1	5 June 2021	Friends Arena, Solna, Sweden	Sweden	1–2	1–3	Friendly
2	24 March 2022	Vazgen Sargsyan Republican Stadium, Yerevan, Armenia	Montenegro	1–0	1–0	Friendly
3	14 June 2022	Vazgen Sargsyan Republican Stadium, Yerevan, Armenia	Scotland	1–0	1–4	2022–23 UEFA Nations League B
4	7 June 2024	Vazgen Sargsyan Republican Stadium, Yerevan, Armenia	Kazakhstan	2–0	2–1	Friendly
5	7 September 2024	Vazgen Sargsyan Republican Stadium, Yerevan, Armenia	Latvia	1–0	4–1	2024–25 UEFA Nations League C
6	29 March 2026	Vazgen Sargsyan Republican Stadium, Yerevan, Armenia	Belarus	1–2	1–2	Friendly

== Honours ==
Shirak Gyumri

- Armenian Cup: 2016–17

Pogoń Szczecin

- Polish Cup runner-up: 2023–24

Legia Warsaw

- Polish Cup: 2024–25
- Polish Super Cup: 2025
