= 2020–21 ŠK Slovan Bratislava season =

Slovan Bratislava
2020–2021 season
- Chairman: Ivan Kmotrík
- Head coach: Ján Kozák Jr. (until 4 September 2020); Darko Milanič (from 7 September 2020 to 9 May 2021); Vladimír Weiss (from 11 May 2021)
- Stadium: Tehelné pole
- Slovak 1st League: 1st
- Slovak Cup: Winners
- UEFA Champions League: First qualifying round
- UEFA Europa League: Second qualifying round
- Top goalscorer: League: Rafael Ratão (14); All: Rafael Ratão (14)
- Highest home attendance: 3,953 (11 Aug 2020 v Zemplín Michalovce, FL Round 2)
- Lowest home attendance: 0 (Note: Limited capacity due to preventive measures against the COVID-19 pandemic.) (numerous matches)
- Biggest win: 6–0 (7 Oct 2020 v Spartak Kvašov, SC Round 3)
- Biggest defeat: 0–3 (awd.) (Note: The first qualifying round match between KÍ and Slovan Bratislava, originally scheduled to be played on 19 August 2020, was postponed to 21 August 2020 due to one staff member from Slovan Bratislava testing positive for SARS-2 coronavirus and the whole team being put into quarantine by the Faroese authorities. As a result, Slovan Bratislava had to send new players, who were mostly from the reserve team. None of the original 18 players could play in the match. On 21 August, the match could not be played due to another player from Slovan Bratislava testing positive for SARS-2 coronavirus and the whole second team being put into quarantine by the Faroese authorities. On 24 August, KÍ were awarded a technical 3–0 victory by UEFA according to the regulations related to COVID-19.) (19 Aug 2020 v KÍ, CL QR1); 0–3 (2 May 2021 v Spartak Trnava, FL Round 29)
Home colours	Away colours

The 2020–21 season was ŠK Slovan Bratislava's 15th consecutive in the top flight of Slovak football.

Slovan were successful in their defence of the domestic double, after winning their third Slovak Super Liga title in a row and a second consecutive Slovak Cup title.

Having won the 2019–20 Slovak First Football League, Slovan contested in the UEFA Champions League, but were eliminated in the first qualifying round after a technical victory was awarded to the opponent according to the regulations related to COVID-19. Subsequently, Slovan competed in the UEFA Europa League, but were eliminated in the second qualifying round.

The season covers the period from July 2020 to 31 May 2021.

== Players ==
As of 22 May 2021

Squad No.	Name	Nationality	Position(s)	Date of birth (age)	Year signed
Goalkeepers
1	Dominik Greif	(Slovakia)	GK	6 April 1997 (age 29)	2015
22	Matúš Ružinský	(Slovakia)	GK	15 January 1992 (age 34)	2018
30	Michal Šulla	(Slovakia)	GK	15 July 1991 (age 35)	2018
31	Martin Trnovský	(Slovakia)	GK	7 June 2000 (age 26)	2019
Defenders
4	Adam Laczkó	(Slovakia)	CB	2 April 1997 (age 29)	2016
14	Myenty Abena	(Suriname)	CB	12 December 1994 (age 31)	2019
17	Jurij Medveděv	(Czech Republic)	RB	18 June 1996 (age 30)	2018
25	Lukáš Pauschek	(Slovakia)	RB	9 December 1992 (age 33)	2019
29	Vasil Bozhikov (captain)	(Bulgaria)	CB / LB	2 June 1988 (age 38)	2017
36	Lucas Lovat	(Brazil)	LB	15 January 1997 (age 29)	2020
66	Kenan Bajrić	(Slovenia)	CB / DM	20 December 1994 (age 31)	2018
81	Vernon De Marco	(Argentina)	LB / CB	18 November 1992 (age 33)	2017
Midfielders
6	Joeri de Kamps	(Netherlands)	DM / CM	10 February 1992 (age 34)	2016
7	Moha	(Morocco)	LW	15 September 1993 (age 33)	2018
8	Dávid Holman	(Hungary)	CAM	17 March 1993 (age 33)	2017
10	Ibrahim Rabiu	(Nigeria)	CM / CAM	15 March 1991 (age 35)	2017
11	Ondřej Petrák	(Czech Republic)	DM / CM	11 March 1992 (age 34)	2020
23	Erik Daniel	(Czech Republic)	RW	4 February 1992 (age 34)	2019
24	Nono	(Spain)	CM / DM	30 March 1993 (age 33)	2018
26	Filip Lichý	(Slovakia)	CM	25 January 2001 (age 25)	2020
77	Aleksandar Čavrić	(Serbia)	RW	18 May 1994 (age 32)	2016
79	Vladimír Weiss Jr.	(Slovakia)	RW / LW / CAM	30 November 1989 (age 36)	2020
—	Dejan Dražić (out on loan at (Poland) Zagłębie Lubin)	(Serbia)	RW / LW / CAM	26 September 1995 (age 31)	2018
—	David Hrnčár (out on loan at (Slovakia) Zlaté Moravce)	(Slovakia)	RW	10 December 1997 (age 28)	2018
—	Alen Mustafić (out on loan at (Slovakia) Nitra)	(Bosnia and Herzegovina)	DM / CM	5 July 1999 (age 27)	2020
Forwards
9	Ezekiel Henty	(Nigeria)	ST / RW / LW / CAM	13 May 1993 (age 33)	2020
12	Alen Ožbolt	(Slovenia)	ST	24 June 1996 (age 30)	2020
15	David Strelec	(Slovakia)	ST / CAM	4 April 2001 (age 25)	2018
21	Rafael Ratão	(Brazil)	ST / CAM / RW / LW	30 November 1995 (age 30)	2020
—	Žan Medved (out on loan at (Poland) Wisła Kraków)	(Slovenia)	ST	14 June 1999 (age 27)	2020

== Transfers and loans ==
=== Transfers in ===
Entry date	Position	Nationality	Name	From	Fee	Ref.
11 July 2020	FW	(Montenegro)	Boris Cmiljanić	(Slovakia) Zlaté Moravce	Loan return	
17 July 2020	MF	(Slovakia)	David Hrnčár	(Slovakia) Zlaté Moravce	Loan return	
18 July 2020	MF	(Slovakia)	Denis Potoma	(Slovakia) Sereď	Loan return	
20 July 2020	MF	(Serbia)	Dejan Dražić	(Poland) Zagłębie Lubin	Loan return	
24 July 2020	MF	(Czech Republic)	Ondřej Petrák	(Germany) 1. FC Nürnberg	Free transfer	
31 July 2020	MF	(Bosnia and Herzegovina)	Alen Mustafić	(Bosnia and Herzegovina) Sarajevo	€120,000 (Note: Unofficial fee.)	
31 December 2020	DF	(Ukraine)	Artem Sukhotskyi	(Belarus) Dinamo Minsk	Loan return	

=== Transfers out ===
Entry date	Position	Nationality	Name	To	Fee	Ref.
1 July 2020	MF	(Croatia)	Marin Ljubičić	End of contract		
2 October 2020	FW	(Greece)	Georgios Tzovaras	(Greece) Apollon Larissa	Free transfer	
12 October 2020	DF	(Netherlands)	Mitch Apau	Released		
20 January 2020	MF	(Slovakia)	Denis Potoma	(Slovakia) Sereď	Free transfer	
4 February 2021	FW	(Montenegro)	Boris Cmiljanić	(Bosnia and Herzegovina) Sarajevo	Free transfer	
19 February 2021	DF	(Ukraine)	Artem Sukhotskyi	(Ukraine) Desna Chernihiv	Free transfer	

=== Loans out ===
Start date	Position	Nationality	Name	To	End date	Ref.
31 July 2020	MF	(Slovakia)	David Hrnčár	(Slovakia) Zlaté Moravce	30 June 2021	
31 July 2020	MF	(Bosnia and Herzegovina)	Alen Mustafić	(Slovakia) Nitra	30 June 2021	
7 August 2020	MF	(Slovakia)	Denis Potoma	(Slovakia) Sereď	31 December 2020	
2 October 2020	MF	(Slovakia)	Dejan Dražić	(Poland) Zagłębie Lubin	30 June 2021	
23 January 2021	FW	(Slovenia)	Žan Medved	(Poland) Wisła Kraków	30 June 2021	

== Friendlies ==
Win Draw Loss

=== Pre-season ===
Saturday, 25 July 2020	Skalica (Slovakia)	0–1	(Slovakia) Slovan Bratislava	Skalica, Slovakia
11:00 CEST (UTC+02:00)	Blažek (yellow card) 74'	Report	Lovat 9'; Ratão (yellow card) 29'; De Marco (yellow card) 56'	Stadium: Mestský štadión Skalica; Attendance: 680

Tuesday, 28 July 2020	Slovan Bratislava (Slovakia)	2–2	(Hungary) Fehérvár	Bratislava, Slovakia
17:30 CEST (UTC+02:00)	De Marco 22'; Medved 27' de Kamps (yellow card) 30'; Abena (yellow card) 31'; Rabiu (yellow card) 90+1'	Report	Pátkai (yellow card) 25'; Houri (yellow card) 31'; Stopira 32'; Bamgboye 63'; (yellow card) 90+1'	Stadium: Tehelné pole

Wednesday, 29 July 2020	Slovan Bratislava (Slovakia)	3–4	(Czech Republic) Slovácko	Malacky, Slovakia
17:30 CEST (UTC+02:00)	Ožbolt 22'; Daniel 33'; Holman 53' (pen.)	Report	Sadílek 28'; Cicilia 38', 57'; Kohút 62'

Saturday, 1 August 2020	Puskás Akadémia (Hungary)	1–2	(Slovakia) Slovan Bratislava	Felcsút, Hungary
18:00 CEST (UTC+02:00)	Plšek 85'	Report	Medved 21'; Ratão 79'	Stadium: Pancho Aréna

Wednesday, 5 August 2020	Slovan Bratislava (Slovakia)	1–1	(Czech Republic) Fastav Zlín	Bratislava, Slovakia
17:00 CEST (UTC+02:00)	Lovat (yellow card) 35'; Henty 84'	Report	Cedidla 14'; Chanturishvili (yellow card) 78'	Stadium: Pasienky

=== Mid-season ===
Saturday, 23 January 2021	Slovan Bratislava (Slovakia)	2–2	(Poland) Górnik Zabrze	Bratislava, Slovakia
13:00 CET (UTC+01:00)	Strelec 32', 45'	Report	Masouras 51'; Kubica 79'	Stadium: Tehelné pole

Tuesday, 26 January 2021	Novi Pazar (Serbia)	1–1	(Slovakia) Slovan Bratislava	Belek, Turkey
14:00 CET (UTC+01:00)	Dragutinović 70'	Report	Strelec 66'

Saturday, 30 January 2021	Dynamo Moscow (Russia)	4–2	(Slovakia) Slovan Bratislava	Belek, Turkey
15:00 CET (UTC+01:00)	Grulyov 20'; Lipovoy 32'; Kaboré (yellow card) 47'; Zakharyan 48'; Moskvichyov (yellow card) 66'; Tyukavin 88'	Report	Daniel 8'; Moha (penalty missed) 51', 52' de Kamps (yellow card) 41' (yellow-red card) 71' (substitution was enabled)

Wednesday, 3 February 2021	Shakhtar Donetsk (Ukraine)	0–1	(Slovakia) Slovan Bratislava	Belek, Turkey
CET (UTC+01:00)		Report	De Marco (yellow card) 67'; Daniel 87'

Saturday, 6 February 2021	Slovan Bratislava (Slovakia)	1–2	(Slovakia) Senica	Bratislava, Slovakia
14:00 CET (UTC+01:00)	Strelec 26'	Report	Košťál 25'; Malec 43' (pen.)	Stadium: Tehelné pole

== Competition overview ==
Competition	First match	Last match	Starting round	Final position	Record							
Competition	First match	Last match	Starting round	Final position	Pld	W	D	L	GF	GA	GD	Win %
Fortuna liga	8 August 2020	22 May 2021	Matchday 1	1st	32	22	5	5	78	28	+50	68.75
Slovak Cup	3 September 2020	19 May 2021	Second round	Winners	7	7	0	0	22	3	+19	100.00
Champions League	– (Note: The first qualifying round match between KÍ and Slovan Bratislava, originally scheduled to be played on 19 August 2020, was postponed to 21 August 2020 due to one staff member from Slovan Bratislava testing positive for SARS-2 coronavirus and the whole team being put into quarantine by the Faroese authorities. As a result, Slovan Bratislava had to send new players, who were mostly from the reserve team. None of the original 18 players could play in the match. On 21 August, the match could not be played due to another player from Slovan Bratislava testing positive for SARS-2 coronavirus and the whole second team being put into quarantine by the Faroese authorities. On 24 August, KÍ were awarded a technical 3–0 victory by UEFA according to the regulations related to COVID-19.)		First qualifying round	First qualifying round	1	0	0	1	0	3	−3	0.00
Europa League	17 September 2020		Second qualifying round	Second qualifying round	1	0	1	0	1	1	+0	0.00
Total					41	29	6	6	101	35	+66	70.73

Source: Competitions

== Fortuna liga ==
=== League table ===
==== Regular stage ====
Pos	Team	Pld	W	D	L	GF	GA	GD	Pts	Qualification
1	Slovan Bratislava	22	17	3	2	54	12	+42	54	Qualification for the championship group
2	DAC Dunajská Streda	22	13	5	4	48	28	+20	44	Qualification for the championship group
3	Žilina	22	11	4	7	49	33	+16	37	Qualification for the championship group
4	Spartak Trnava	22	11	2	9	32	29	+3	35	Qualification for the championship group
5	Zlaté Moravce	22	9	6	7	38	29	+9	33	Qualification for the championship group
6	Trenčín	22	7	7	8	30	38	−8	28	Qualification for the championship group

Source: Niké liga (in Slovak)
Rules for classification: 1) Points; 2) Head-to-head points; 3) Head-to-head goal difference; 4) Head-to-head away goals scored; 5) Play-off.

==== Championship group ====
Pos	Team	Pld	W	D	L	GF	GA	GD	Pts	Qualification	SLO	DAC	TRN	ŽIL	ZLM	TRE
1	Slovan Bratislava (C)	32	22	5	5	78	28	+50	71	Qualification for the Champions League first qualifying round	—	0–1	1–2	2–2	4–1	2–1
2	DAC Dunajská Streda	32	19	8	5	66	38	+28	65	Qualification for the Europa Conference League second qualifying round	2–2	—	2–0	2–1	2–0	2–0
3	Spartak Trnava	32	17	4	11	48	37	+11	55	Qualification for the Europa Conference League first qualifying round	3–0	3–2	—	1–1	3–0	2–0
4	Žilina	32	15	7	10	73	52	+21	52	Qualification for the Europa Conference League play-offs	2–3	3–3	2–1	—	5–1	5–3
5	Zlaté Moravce	32	11	7	14	42	51	−9	40	Qualification for the Europa Conference League play-offs	0–4	0–1	0–0	1–0	—	1–0
6	Trenčín	32	8	8	16	42	61	−19	32	Qualification for the Europa Conference League play-offs	2–6	1–1	0–1	2–3	3–0	—

Source: Niké liga (in Slovak)
Legend: Blue = home team win; Yellow = draw; Red = away team win.
Rules for classification: 1) Points; 2) Head-to-head points; 3) Head-to-head goal difference; 4) Head-to-head away goals scored; 5) Play-off.
(C) Champions

=== Results summary ===
Overall								Home						Away					
Pld	W	D	L	GF	GA	GD	Pts	W	D	L	GF	GA	GD	W	D	L	GF	GA	GD
32	22	5	5	78	28	+50	71	12	1	3	37	12	+25	10	4	2	41	16	+25

=== Results by matchday ===
Round	1	2	3	4	5	6	7	8	9	10	11	12	13	14	15	16	17	18	19	20	21	22	23	24	25	26	27	28	29	30	31	32
Ground	A	H	A	H	A	H	A	H	A	H	A	H	A	H	A	H	A	H	A	H	A	H	A	H	H	A	H	A	A	H	A	H
Result	W	W	L	W	W	W	D	W	W	W	D	L	W	W	W	W	W	W	D	W	W	W	W	D	W	D	L	W	L	L	W	W
Position	2	1	3	3	2	2	2	2	2	2	2	2	1	1	1	1	1	1	1	1	1	1	1	1	1	1	1	1	1	1	1	1

A = Away; H = Home; W = Win; D = Draw; L = Loss

=== Matches ===
Regular stage

Saturday, 8 August 2020 1	Nitra	0–5	Slovan Bratislava	Nitra
18:00 CEST (UTC+02:00)	Šefčík (yellow card) 1'; Vrábel (yellow card) 59'; Hovhannisyan (yellow card) 63'	Report	Medved 12', 49'; Rabiu 37'; Magda 42' (o.g.); Strelec 45' de Kamps (yellow card) 69'	Stadium: Štadión pod Zoborom; Attendance: 2,536

Tuesday, 11 August 2020 2	Slovan Bratislava	5–0	Zemplín Michalovce	Bratislava
20:00 CEST (UTC+02:00)	Strelec 3', 61'; Medveděv (yellow card) 56'; Holman 73'; Ožbolt 87'; Ratão 90+1'	Report	Neofytidis (yellow card) 17'; Hinds (yellow card) 56'	Stadium: Tehelné pole Attendance: 3,953

Saturday, 15 August 2020 3	Zlaté Moravce	2–1	Slovan Bratislava	Zlaté Moravce
19:00 CEST (UTC+02:00)	Duga 25'; Apau 47' (o.g.); Balaj (yellow card) 77'; Ďubek (yellow card) 81'; Tkáč (yellow card) 90+7'	Report	Bajrić (yellow card) 30'; Ožbolt 31'; Petrák (yellow card) 58'; Henty (yellow card) 90+7'	Stadium: Štadión FC ViOn; Attendance: 2,003

Monday, 31 August 2020 5	Trenčín	1–2	Slovan Bratislava	Žilina
19:00 CEST (UTC+02:00)	Medveděv 23' (o.g.); Yem (yellow card) 43'; Kapuadi (yellow card) 79'	Report	De Marco 44', 70'; Rabiu (yellow card) 60'; Medveděv (yellow card) 81'	Stadium: Štadión pod Dubňom; Attendance: 982

Saturday, 12 September 2020 6	Slovan Bratislava	2–0	Spartak Trnava	Bratislava
18:30 CEST (UTC+02:00)	Medved 13'; Nono 22', (yellow card) 87'; De Marco (yellow card) 38'; Lovat (yellow card) 90+3'	Report	Mikovič (yellow card) 21'; Grič (yellow card) 68'; Savvidis (yellow card) 90+3'	Stadium: Tehelné pole Attendance: 258

Sunday, 20 September 2020 7	Žilina	2–2	Slovan Bratislava	Žilina
18:00 CEST (UTC+02:00)	Kurminowski 16'; Bajrić 30' (o.g.); Javorček (yellow card) 78'; Kaprálik (yellow card) 90'	Report	Medveděv 13'; Nono (yellow card) 33'; Lovat (yellow card) 37'; Bajrić 39'	Stadium: Štadión pod Dubňom; Attendance: 972

Saturday, 26 September 2020 8	Slovan Bratislava	5–0	Ružomberok	Bratislava
19:10 (Note: The kick-off time of the match was postponed by 10 minutes due to technical problems with the lighting at the stadium.) CEST (UTC+02:00)	Čavrić 24', 47'; Holman 30', 60' de Kamps (yellow card) 55'; Ratão 79'; Weiss Jr. (yellow card) 84'	Report	Maslo (penalty missed) 45+1', (yellow card) 59'; Čurma (yellow card) 51'; Zsigmund (yellow card) 53'	Stadium: Tehelné pole Attendance: 975

Wednesday, 30 September 2020 4	Slovan Bratislava	2–0	Senica	Bratislava
18:00 CEST (UTC+02:00)	Holman 19' de Kamps (yellow card) 73'; Strelec 79'	Report	Totka (yellow card) 56'; Piroska (yellow card) 78'; Nemec (yellow card) 90'	Stadium: Tehelné pole Attendance: 982
Note: The match, originally scheduled for 22 August, was postponed due to the occurrence of coronavirus disease in the home team.

Sunday, 4 October 2020 9	Pohronie	1–2	Slovan Bratislava	Žiar nad Hronom
18:00 CEST (UTC+02:00)	Blahút 40'; Fadera (yellow card) 66'; Bimenyimana (yellow card) 67'; Mazan (yellow card) 81'; Obročník (yellow card) 82'; Župa (yellow card) 88'	Report	Ratão 27', 59'; Holman (yellow card) 68'; Greif (yellow card) 75'; Nono (yellow card) 77'	Stadium: Futbalový štadión Žiar nad Hronom; Attendance: 0

Saturday, 17 October 2020 10	Slovan Bratislava	3–0	Sereď	Bratislava
17:00 CEST (UTC+02:00)	Medved 1', (yellow card) 57'; Ratão 11', 34'; Abena (yellow card) 45'	Report	Šumský (yellow card) 24'; Jureškin (yellow card) 45'; Tatranský (yellow card) 54'	Stadium: Tehelné pole Attendance: 0

Sunday, 25 October 2020 11	DAC Dunajská Streda	1–1	Slovan Bratislava	Dunajská Streda
16:00 CET (UTC+01:00)	Balić 34'; Kružliak (yellow card) 39'; Davis (yellow card) 47'	Report	Kružliak 26' (o.g.); Nono (yellow card) 32'; De Marco (yellow card) 70'; Rabiu (yellow card) 88'	Stadium: MOL Aréna; Attendance: 0

Sunday, 1 November 2020 12	Slovan Bratislava	0–1	Nitra	Bratislava
17:00 CET (UTC+01:00)	Holman (yellow card) 86'; Weiss Jr. (yellow card) 90+3'	Report	Gatarić (yellow card) 50'; Mustafić 62'	Stadium: Tehelné pole Attendance: 0

Saturday, 7 November 2020 13	Zemplín Michalovce	0–2	Slovan Bratislava	Michalovce
17:00 CET (UTC+01:00)	Žofčák (yellow card) 40'; Vojtko (yellow card) 70'	Report	Ratão 41'; Ožbolt 57' (pen.)	Stadium: Mestský futbalový štadión Attendance: 0

Sunday, 22 November 2020 14	Slovan Bratislava	2–1	Zlaté Moravce	Bratislava
15:00 CET (UTC+01:00)	De Marco 17'; Bajrić (yellow card) 39'; Holman (yellow card) 43'; Strelec 66'	Report	Grozdanovski (yellow card) 22'; Ďubek 56'	Stadium: Tehelné pole Attendance: 0

Sunday, 29 November 2020 15	Senica	0–3	Slovan Bratislava	Senica
15:00 CET (UTC+01:00)	Piroska (yellow card) 26'; Addo (yellow card) 30'; Asanović (yellow card) 73'; Carrillo (yellow card) 86'	Report	De Marco (yellow card) 39'; Strelec 41'; Ratão 66' de Kamps (yellow card) 78'; Holman 86'	Stadium: Štadión FK Senica; Attendance: 0

Saturday, 5 December 2020 16	Slovan Bratislava	2–0	Trenčín	Bratislava
17:00 CET (UTC+01:00)	Holman 21' (pen.), 90'	Report	El Mahdioui (red card) 82'	Stadium: Tehelné pole Attendance: 0

Sunday, 13 December 2020 17	Spartak Trnava	0–3	Slovan Bratislava	Trnava
15:00 CET (UTC+01:00)	Mikovič (yellow card) 16'; Kolesár (yellow card) 25'; Savvidis (yellow card) 37'; Kóša (yellow card) 79'	Report	Holman 17' (pen.), (yellow card) 65'; Strelec 33'; Bajrić (yellow card) 37'; Abena (red card) 45+4'; Rabiu 84'	Stadium: Štadión Antona Malatinského; Attendance: 0

Wednesday, 16 December 2020 18	Slovan Bratislava	3–2	Žilina	Bratislava
18:15 CET (UTC+01:00)	de Kamps (yellow card) 32'; Daniel 48', 65'; Bajrić (yellow card) 89'; Ratão 90+4'; Lovat (yellow card) 90+5'	Report	Bernát 38'; Fazlagić (yellow card) 58', (goal) 85'; Bichakhchyan (yellow card) 88'	Stadium: Tehelné pole Attendance: 0

Saturday, 13 February 2021 19	Ružomberok	0–0	Slovan Bratislava	Ružomberok
16:00 CET (UTC+01:00)	Gerec (yellow card) 90+2'	Report		Stadium: Štadión pod Čebraťom; Attendance: 0

Saturday, 20 February 2021 20	Slovan Bratislava	1–0	Pohronie	Bratislava
14:00 CET (UTC+01:00)	De Marco (yellow card) 38'; Daniel 48'	Report	Galuška (penalty missed) 80'; Pavlík (yellow card) 88'	Stadium: Tehelné pole Attendance: 0

Sunday, 28 February 2021 21	Sereď	0–5	Slovan Bratislava	Zlaté Moravce
15:00 CET (UTC+01:00)	Jureškin (yellow card) 24'; Eneji Moses (yellow card) 28'; Šumský (yellow card) 32'; Morong (yellow card) 44'; Michalík (yellow card) 70'; Mečiar (yellow card) 71'	Report	De Marco 7', 29' de Kamps (yellow card) 25'; Nono 56'; Ožbolt 72' (pen.); Lovat (yellow card) 78'; Daniel 90+2'	Stadium: Štadión FC ViOn; Attendance: 0

Saturday, 6 March 2021 22	Slovan Bratislava	3–1	DAC Dunajská Streda	Bratislava
14:30 CET (UTC+01:00)	Weiss Jr. 3', 11' (pen.); De Marco (yellow card) 47'; Moha 57'	Report	Schäfer (yellow card) 18'; Divković 32'; Ramírez (yellow card) 40'; Taiwo (yellow card) 85'	Stadium: Tehelné pole Attendance: 0

Championship group

Sunday, 14 March 2021 23 / Championship group round 1	Trenčín	2–6	Slovan Bratislava	Trenčín
16:00 CET (UTC+01:00)	Demitra 29'; Zubairu (yellow card) 30' (yellow-red card) 75'; Corryn 43', (yellow card) 70'; Čataković (yellow card) 52'	Report	Moha 15', 28'; Čavrić 62'; Henty 70'; Rabiu (yellow card) 81'; Ratão 83' (pen.); Ožbolt 89'	Stadium: Štadión Sihoť; Attendance: 0

Saturday, 20 March 2021 24 / 2	Slovan Bratislava	2–2	Žilina	Bratislava
17:30 CET (UTC+01:00)	de Kamps (yellow card) 43'; Moha 49' (pen.); Rabiu (yellow card) 55'; Ratão (yellow card) 81', (goal) 90+4' (pen.)	Report	Fazlagić (yellow card) 30'; Ďuriš 32'; Kurminowski 63' (pen.); Kiwior (yellow card) 84'; Myslovič (yellow card) 90'; Slebodník (yellow card) 90+2'; Sluka (yellow card) 90+3'	Stadium: Tehelné pole Attendance: 0

Saturday, 3 April 2021 25 / 3	Slovan Bratislava	4–1	Zlaté Moravce	Bratislava
15:30 CEST (UTC+02:00)	Čavrić (yellow card) 30'; Ratão 47'; Moha 54', 80'; Ožbolt 88'	Report	Čonka 45+2'; Hrnčár (yellow card) 49'	Stadium: Tehelné pole Attendance: 0

Sunday, 11 April 2021 26 / 4	DAC Dunajská Streda	2–2	Slovan Bratislava	Dunajská Streda
16:00 CEST (UTC+02:00)	Jedlička (yellow card) 7'; Ramírez 53', 88'; Nebyla (yellow card) 60'	Report	Holman 7', (yellow card) 68'; Bajrić 77'	Stadium: MOL Aréna; Attendance: 0

Saturday, 17 April 2021 27 / 5	Slovan Bratislava	1–2	Spartak Trnava	Bratislava
15:30 CEST (UTC+02:00)	de Kamps (yellow card) 35'; De Marco (yellow card) 42'; Ratão 84' (pen.)	Report	Bozhikov 12' (o.g.); Yusuf (yellow card) 20'; Vlasko (yellow card) 45'; Savvidis 65'; Kóša (yellow card) 90+3'; Grič (yellow card) 90+5'	Stadium: Tehelné pole Attendance: 0

Sunday, 25 April 2021 28 / 6	Žilina	2–3	Slovan Bratislava	Žilina
16:00 CEST (UTC+02:00)	Fazlagić (yellow card) 30'; Minárik 43', (yellow card) 90+5'; Bernát 54'; Paur (yellow card) 60'; Anang (yellow card) 81'	Report	Anang 19' (o.g.) de Kamps (yellow card) 31'; Ratão 38'; Rabiu (yellow card) 78'; Weiss Jr. 86' (pen.)	Stadium: Štadión pod Dubňom; Attendance: 0

Sunday, 2 May 2021 29 / 7	Spartak Trnava	3–0	Slovan Bratislava	Trnava
18:00 CEST (UTC+02:00)	Grič (yellow card) 8'; Ristovski 20' (pen.), 84' (pen.); Mikovič (yellow card) 24'; Vlasko (yellow card) 39'; Yusuf 76'; Karhan (red card) 88'	Report	Holman (yellow card) 14'; De Marco (yellow card) 75'; Nono (yellow card) 90+3'	Stadium: Štadión Antona Malatinského; Attendance: 0

Sunday, 9 May 2021 30 / 8	Slovan Bratislava	0–1	DAC Dunajská Streda	Bratislava
18:00 CEST (UTC+02:00)	De Marco (yellow card) 45'; Holman (yellow card) 90'; Bajrić (yellow card) 90+3'	Report	Beskorovainyi (yellow card) 18'; Ramírez (yellow card) 55'; Sommer (yellow card) 63'; Divković 78'	Stadium: Tehelné pole Attendance: 0

Saturday, 15 May 2021 31 / 9	Zlaté Moravce	0–4	Slovan Bratislava	Zlaté Moravce
17:00 CEST (UTC+02:00)	Balaj (yellow card) 27'	Report	de Kamps (yellow card) 25'; Strelec 26', 42'; Weiss Jr. (yellow card) 50'; Henty 74', 75'	Stadium: Štadión FC ViOn; Attendance: 257

Saturday, 22 May 2021 32 / 10	Slovan Bratislava	2–1	Trenčín	Bratislava
19:00 CEST (UTC+02:00)	Holman 5'; Lichý 7'; Lovat (yellow card) 58'	Report	Lavrinčík (yellow card) 71'; Ikoba 80'	Stadium: Tehelné pole Attendance: 500

== Slovak Cup ==
Thursday, 3 September 2020 Second round	Beluša (3)	0–2	Slovan Bratislava (1)	Beluša
17:00 CEST (UTC+02:00)	Gašpar (penalty missed) 89'	Report	Henty 14' (pen.); Abena (yellow card) 88'; Ožbolt 90+1'	Stadium: Štadión TJ Kovo Beluša; Attendance: 989

Wednesday, 7 October 2020 Third round	Spartak Kvašov (4)	0–6	Slovan Bratislava (1)	Nemšová
15:00 CEST (UTC+02:00)		Report	Bajrić 6'; Ožbolt 10'; Weiss Jr. 32'; Henty 34'; Cmiljanić 74', 88'	Stadium: Štadión Nemšová; Attendance: 0

Fourth round	Príbelce (4)	w/o	Slovan Bratislava (1)	Príbelce
				Stadium: Močár Príbelce
Note: The match, originally scheduled for 21 October 2020, was postponed due to measures against COVID-19 pandemic.

Wednesday, 7 April 2021 Round of 16	Slovan Bratislava (1)	1–0	Tatran Liptovský Mikuláš (2)	Senec
16:00 CEST (UTC+02:00)	de Kamps (yellow card) 27'; De Marco (yellow card) 56'; Ožbolt 69'; Abena (yellow card) 71'	Report	Staš (yellow card) 41'	Stadium: NTC Senec; Attendance: 0

Wednesday, 14 April 2021 Quarter-finals	Slovan Bratislava (1)	5–1	Petržalka (2)	Bratislava
15:30 CEST (UTC+02:00)	Abena 13'; De Marco 19'; Bajrić (yellow card) 22'; Strelec 40'; Daniel 46'; Holman 67'	Report	Farkaš (yellow card) 21'; Obročník (yellow card) 43'; De Marco 79' (o.g.); Dopater (yellow card) 84'	Stadium: Tehelné pole Attendance: 0

Thursday, 29 April 2021 Semi-finals First leg	Slovan Bratislava (1)	3–0	Dukla Banská Bystrica (2)	Bratislava
15:30 CEST (UTC+02:00)	De Marco 31'; Medveděv (yellow card) 37'; Strelec 64'; Ožbolt 81'	Report	Vujošević (yellow card) 18'; Kvocera (yellow card) 44'	Stadium: Tehelné pole Attendance: 0

Wednesday, 5 May 2021 Semi-finals Second leg	Dukla Banská Bystrica (2)	1–3 (1–6 agg.)	Slovan Bratislava (1)	Zvolen
15:30 CEST (UTC+02:00)	Abena 20' (o.g.); Polievka (yellow card) 69'; Migaľa (yellow card) 70'; Jackuliak (yellow card) 81'	Report	Henty 9'; Ožbolt 25'; Lovat 89'	Stadium: Štadión MFK Zvolen; Attendance: 0

Wednesday, 19 May 2021 Final	Žilina (1)	1–2 (a.e.t.)	Slovan Bratislava (1)	Bratislava
18:00 CEST (UTC+02:00)	Minárik (red card) 26'; Kiwior 30'; Ďuriš (yellow card) 75'; Rusnák (yellow card) 78'; Fazlagić (yellow card) 90'; Javorček (yellow card) 90+2'; Bernát (yellow card) 120'; Kurminowski (yellow card) 120'	Report	De Marco (yellow card) 23'; Henty 61'; Weiss Jr. 105+4' (pen.), (yellow card) 98' (yellow-red card) 111'; Šulla (yellow card) 120'; Bajrić (yellow card) 120'; Abena (yellow card) 120'	Stadium: Tehelné pole Attendance: 0

== UEFA Champions League ==
=== First qualifying round ===
Wednesday, 19 August 2020 Q1	KÍ (Faroe Islands)	3–0 (awd.)	(Slovakia) Slovan Bratislava	Klaksvík, Faroe Islands
18:00 CEST (UTC+02:00)				Stadium: Við Djúpumýrar; Attendance: 0 (Note: The qualifying stage of the Champions League was played behind closed doors due to the COVID-19 pandemic in Europe.)
Note: The match, originally scheduled to be played on 19 August 2020, was postponed to 21 August 2020 due to one staff member from Slovan Bratislava testing positive for SARS-2 coronavirus and the whole team being put into quarantine by the Faroese authorities. As a result, Slovan Bratislava had to send new players, who were mostly from the reserve team. None of the original 18 players could play in the match. On 21 August, the match could not be played due to another player from Slovan Bratislava testing positive for SARS-2 coronavirus and the whole second team being put into quarantine by the Faroese authorities. On 24 August, KÍ were awarded a technical 3–0 victory by UEFA according to the regulations related to COVID-19.

== UEFA Europa League ==
=== Second qualifying round ===
Thursday, 17 September 2020 Q2	KuPS (Finland)	1–1 (a.e.t.) (4–3 p)	(Slovakia) Slovan Bratislava	Kuopio, Finland
17:30 CEST (UTC+02:00)	Nissilä (yellow card) 71'; Tomás (yellow card) 73'; Niskanen (yellow card) 85'; Pennanen (yellow card) 89'; Udo 120'	Report	Medved (yellow card) 37', (goal) 111'; Bajrić (yellow card) 52'	Stadium: Savon Sanomat Areena; Attendance: 0 (Note: The qualifying stage of the Europa League was played behind closed doors due to the COVID-19 pandemic in Europe.)
	Penalties
	Pennanen (penalty scored); Udo (penalty scored); Niskanen (penalty missed); Tomás (penalty scored); Adjei-Boateng (penalty scored)		(penalty scored) De Marco; (penalty scored) Ožbolt; (penalty scored) de Kamps; (penalty missed) Ratão; (penalty missed) Nono

== Statistics ==
=== Goalscorers ===
As of match played 22 May 2021

No.	Pos.	Nat.	Name	Fortuna liga	Slovak Cup	Europa League	Total
7	MF	(Morocco)	Moha	6			6
8	MF	(Hungary)	Dávid Holman	10	1		11
9	FW	(Nigeria)	Ezekiel Henty	3	4		7
10	MF	(Nigeria)	Ibrahim Rabiu	2			2
12	FW	(Slovenia)	Alen Ožbolt	6	5		11
14	DF	(Suriname)	Myenty Abena		1		1
15	FW	(Slovakia)	David Strelec	9	2		11
17	DF	(Czech Republic)	Jurij Medveděv	1			1
18	FW	(Montenegro)	Boris Cmiljanić		2		2
21	FW	(Brazil)	Rafael Ratão	14			14
23	MF	(Czech Republic)	Erik Daniel	4	1		5
24	MF	(Spain)	Nono	2			2
26	MF	(Slovakia)	Filip Lichý	1			1
36	DF	(Brazil)	Lucas Lovat		1		1
55	FW	(Slovenia)	Žan Medved	4		1	5
66	DF	(Slovenia)	Kenan Bajrić	2	1		3
77	MF	(Serbia)	Aleksandar Čavrić	3			3
79	MF	(Slovakia)	Vladimír Weiss Jr.	3	2		5
81	DF	(Argentina)	Vernon De Marco	5	2		7
Own goals				3			3
Total				78	22	1	101

=== Clean sheets ===
As of match played 22 May 2021

No.	Nat.	Name	Fortuna liga	Slovak Cup	Europa League	Total
1	(Slovakia)	Dominik Greif	12			12
22	(Slovakia)	Matúš Ružinský		1		1
30	(Slovakia)	Michal Šulla	2	3		5
Total			14	4	0	18

=== Disciplinary record ===
As of match played 22 May 2021

No.	Pos.	Nat.	Name	Fortuna liga			Slovak Cup			Europa League			Total		
No.	Pos.	Nat.	Name	Yellow card	(yellow card) (yellow-red card)	Red card	Yellow card	(yellow card) (yellow-red card)	Red card	Yellow card	(yellow card) (yellow-red card)	Red card	Yellow card	(yellow card) (yellow-red card)	Red card
1	GK	(Slovakia)	Dominik Greif	1									1	0	0
6	MF	(Netherlands)	Joeri de Kamps	10			1						11	0	0
8	MF	(Hungary)	Dávid Holman	7									7	0	0
9	FW	(Nigeria)	Ezekiel Henty	1									1	0	0
10	MF	(Nigeria)	Ibrahim Rabiu	5									5	0	0
11	MF	(Czech Republic)	Ondřej Petrák	1									1	0	0
14	DF	(Netherlands)	Myenty Abena	1		1	3						4	0	1
17	DF	(Czech Republic)	Jurij Medveděv	2			1						3	0	0
21	FW	(Brazil)	Rafael Ratão	1									1	0	0
24	MF	(Spain)	Nono	5									5	0	0
30	GK	(Slovakia)	Michal Šulla				1						1	0	0
36	DF	(Brazil)	Lucas Lovat	5									5	0	0
55	FW	(Slovenia)	Žan Medved	1						1			2	0	0
66	DF	(Slovenia)	Kenan Bajrić	5			2			1			8	0	0
77	MF	(Serbia)	Aleksandar Čavrić	1									1	0	0
79	MF	(Slovakia)	Vladimír Weiss Jr.	3			1	1					4	1	0
81	DF	(Argentina)	Vernon De Marco	8			2						10	0	0
Total				57	0	1	11	1	0	2	0	0	70	1	1

== Awards ==
=== Fortuna liga Goal of the Month ===
Month	Player	Ref
December	(Czech Republic) Erik Daniel	

=== Fortuna liga Team of the Season ===
Position	Player	Ref
GK	(Slovakia) Dominik Greif	
DF	(Bulgaria) Vasil Bozhikov	
DF	(Argentina) Vernon De Marco	
MF	(Netherlands) Joeri de Kamps	
FW	(Brazil) Rafael Ratão	
FW	(Slovakia) David Strelec	

=== Fortuna liga Under-21 Team of the Season ===
Position	Player	Ref
FW	(Slovakia) David Strelec	
