= 2021–22 ŠK Slovan Bratislava season =

Slovan Bratislava
2021–22 season
- Chairman: Ivan Kmotrík
- Head coach: Vladimír Weiss
- Stadium: Tehelné pole
- Slovak 1st League: 1st
- Slovak Cup: Runners-up
- UEFA Champions League: Second qualifying round
- UEFA Europa League: Play-off round
- UEFA Europa Conference League: Group stage
- Top goalscorer: League: Ezekiel Henty (9); All: Andre Green (15)
- Highest home attendance: 9,833 (16 Sep 2021 v Copenhagen, ECL GS)
- Lowest home attendance: 0 (Note: Limited capacity due to preventive measures against the COVID-19 pandemic.) (numerous matches)
- Biggest win: 7–0 (4 Sep 2021 v Jednota Málinec, SC Round 2)
- Biggest defeat: 0–3 (19 Aug 2021 v Olympiacos, EL Q PO)
Home colours	Away colours	Third colours

The 2021–22 season was ŠK Slovan Bratislava's 16th consecutive in the top flight of Slovak football.

Slovan successfully retained their league title, winning a record-breaking fourth title in a row and 12th overall since the competition was established in 1993. However, they were not successful in defending their Slovak Cup title, after losing in the final.

As league champion from the previous season, Slovan qualified for the UEFA Champions League. They were eliminated in the second qualifying round. Subsequently, Slovan competed in this season's edition of the UEFA Europa League, but were eliminated in the play-off round. Afterwards, Slovan were transferred to the group stage of the newly created UEFA Europa Conference League, where the club finished third and did not advance to the next stage of the competition.

The season covers the period from 1 June 2021 to 31 May 2022.

== Players ==
As of 21 May 2022

Squad No.	Name	Nationality	Position(s)	Date of birth (age)	Signed from / Previous club	Year signed
Goalkeepers
1	Adrián Chovan	(Slovakia)	GK	8 October 1995 (age 31)	(Slovakia) Zlaté Moravce	2021
22	Matúš Ružinský	(Slovakia)	GK	15 January 1992 (age 34)	(Slovakia) Sereď	2018
30	Michal Šulla	(Slovakia)	GK	15 July 1991 (age 35)	(Slovakia) Senica	2018
31	Martin Trnovský	(Slovakia)	GK	7 June 2000 (age 26)	youth system	2019
35	Adam Hrdina	(Slovakia)	GK	12 February 2004 (age 22)	youth system	2022
Defenders
4	Guram Kashia	(Georgia (country))	CB	4 July 1987 (age 39)	(Georgia (country)) Locomotive Tbilisi	2021
5	Richard Križan	(Slovakia)	CB	23 September 1997 (age 29)	(Slovakia) Trenčín	2021
14	Myenty Abena	(Suriname) (Netherlands)	CB	12 December 1994 (age 31)	(Slovakia) Spartak Trnava	2019
17	Jurij Medveděv	(Czech Republic) (Kazakhstan)	RB	18 June 1996 (age 30)	(Slovakia) Senica	2018
18	David Hrnčár	(Slovakia)	RB / RW	10 December 1997 (age 28)	youth system	2021
25	Lukáš Pauschek	(Slovakia)	RB	9 December 1992 (age 33)	(Czech Republic) Mladá Boleslav	2019
27	Matúš Vojtko	(Slovakia)	LB	5 October 2000 (age 26)	(Slovakia) Zemplín Michalovce	2021
29	Vasil Bozhikov (captain)	(Bulgaria)	CB / LB	2 June 1988 (age 38)	(Turkey) Kasımpaşa	2017
36	Lucas Lovat	(Brazil)	LB	15 January 1997 (age 29)	(Slovakia) Spartak Trnava	2020
81	Vernon De Marco	(Slovakia) (Argentina)	LB / CB	18 November 1992 (age 33)	(Slovakia) Zemplín Michalovce	2017
—	Kenan Bajrić (out on loan at (Cyprus) Pafos)	(Slovenia)	CB / DM	20 December 1994 (age 31)	(Slovenia) Olimpija Ljubljana	2018
Midfielders
3	Uche Agbo	(Nigeria)	DM / CM	4 December 1995 (age 30)	(Spain) Deportivo La Coruña	2021
7	Vladimír Weiss Jr.	(Slovakia)	CAM / RW / LW	30 November 1989 (age 36)	(Qatar) Al-Gharafa	2020
8	Dávid Holman	(Hungary)	CAM	17 March 1993 (age 33)	(Hungary) Debrecen	2017
10	Ibrahim Rabiu	(Nigeria)	CM / CAM	15 March 1991 (age 35)	(Belgium) Gent	2017
11	Tigran Barseghyan	(Armenia)	RW / LW	22 September 1993 (age 33)	(Kazakhstan) Astana	2022
16	Alen Mustafić	(Bosnia and Herzegovina)	DM / CM	5 July 1999 (age 27)	(Bosnia and Herzegovina) Sarajevo	2020
19	Andre Green	(England)	LW / RW	26 July 1998 (age 28)	(England) Sheffield Wednesday	2021
20	Jaba Kankava	(Georgia (country))	DM	18 March 1986 (age 40)	(France) Valenciennes	2021
21	Jaromír Zmrhal	(Czech Republic)	LW / RW	2 August 1993 (age 33)	(Italy) Brescia	2021
24	Martin Schlossár	(Slovakia)	CM	24 July 1998 (age 28)	youth system	2022
77	Aleksandar Čavrić	(Serbia)	RW / ST	18 May 1994 (age 32)	(Belgium) Genk	2016
—	Erik Daniel (out on loan at (Poland) Zagłębie Lubin)	(Czech Republic) (Slovakia)	RW	4 February 1992 (age 34)	(Slovakia) Ružomberok	2019
—	Dejan Dražić (out on loan at (Hungary) Honvéd)	(Serbia)	RW / LW / CAM	26 September 1995 (age 31)	(Spain) Celta Vigo B	2018
—	Joeri de Kamps (out on loan at (Netherlands) Sparta Rotterdam)	(Netherlands)	DM	10 February 1992 (age 34)	(Netherlands) NAC Breda	2016
—	Marián Chobot (out on loan at (Slovakia) Zlaté Moravce)	(Slovakia)	LW	31 August 1999 (age 27)	(Slovakia) Nitra	2021
—	Filip Lichý (out on loan at (Slovakia) Ružomberok)	(Slovakia)	CM / DM	25 January 2001 (age 25)	youth system	2020
Forwards
9	Ivan Šaponjić	(Serbia)	ST	2 August 1997 (age 29)	(Spain) Atlético Madrid	2022
23	Roman Čerepkai	(Slovakia)	ST / CAM	6 April 2002 (age 24)	youth system	2022
28	Adler Da Silva (on loan from (Slovakia) Pohronie)	(Switzerland) (Brazil)	ST / CAM	28 December 1998 (age 27)	—	—
33	Samuel Mráz (on loan from (Italy) Spezia)	(Slovakia)	ST	13 May 1997 (age 29)	—	—
—	Ezekiel Henty (out on loan at (Saudi Arabia) Al-Hazem)	(Nigeria)	ST / RW / LW	13 May 1993 (age 33)	(Hungary) Puskás Akadémia	2020
—	Žan Medved (out on loan at (Slovenia) Celje)	(Slovenia)	ST	14 June 1999 (age 27)	(Slovenia) Olimpija Ljubljana	2020
—	Alen Ožbolt (out on loan at (Israel) Hapoel Haifa)	(Slovenia)	ST	24 June 1996 (age 30)	(Bulgaria) Lokomotiv Plovdiv	2020

== Transfers and loans ==
=== Transfers in ===
Date	Position	Nationality	Name	From	Fee	Ref.
30 June 2021	MF	(Serbia)	Dejan Dražić	(Poland) Zagłębie Lubin	Loan return	
30 June 2021	MF	(Slovakia)	David Hrnčár	(Slovakia) Zlaté Moravce	Loan return	
30 June 2021	FW	(Slovenia)	Žan Medved	(Poland) Wisła Kraków	Loan return	
30 June 2021	MF	(Bosnia and Herzegovina)	Alen Mustafić	(Slovakia) Nitra	Loan return	
1 July 2021	MF	(Slovakia)	Marián Chobot	(Slovakia) Nitra	Free transfer	
1 July 2021	GK	(Slovakia)	Adrián Chovan	(Slovakia) Zlaté Moravce	Undisclosed	
1 July 2021	MF	(Georgia (country))	Jaba Kankava	(France) Valenciennes	Free transfer	
1 July 2021	DF	(Georgia (country))	Guram Kashia	(Georgia (country)) Locomotive Tbilisi	Free transfer	
1 July 2021	MF	(Czech Republic)	Jaromír Zmrhal	(Italy) Brescia	Free transfer	
30 July 2021	DF	(Slovakia)	Richard Križan	(Slovakia) Trenčín	Undisclosed	
19 August 2021	MF	(England)	Andre Green	(England) Sheffield Wednesday	Undisclosed	
26 August 2021	DF	(Slovakia)	Matúš Vojtko	(Slovakia) Zemplín Michalovce	€200,000	
2 September 2021	MF	(Nigeria)	Uche Agbo	(Spain) Deportivo La Coruña	Free transfer	
1 January 2022	MF	(Armenia)	Tigran Barseghyan	(Kazakhstan) Astana	Free transfer	
22 January 2022	FW	(Serbia)	Ivan Šaponjić	(Spain) Atlético Madrid	Free transfer	

=== Loans in ===
Start date	Position	Nationality	Name	From	End date	Ref.
2 September 2021	FW	(Switzerland)	Adler Da Silva	(Slovakia) Pohronie	30 June 2022	
2 September 2021	FW	(Slovakia)	Samuel Mráz	(Italy) Spezia	30 June 2022	

=== Transfers out ===
Date	Position	Nationality	Name	To	Fee	Ref.
1 July 2021	MF	(Morocco)	Moha	(Saudi Arabia) Al-Hazem	End of contract	
1 July 2021	MF	(Spain)	Nono	(Hungary) Honvéd	€500,000	
6 July 2021	GK	(Slovakia)	Dominik Greif	(Spain) Mallorca	€2,500,000	
31 August 2021	FW	(Brazil)	Rafael Ratão	(France) Toulouse	€1,200,000	
31 August 2021	FW	(Slovakia)	David Strelec	(Italy) Spezia	€2,500,000	
29 January 2022	MF	(Czech Republic)	Ondřej Petrák	(Czech Republic) Bohemians 1905	Free transfer	

=== Loans out ===
Start date	Position	Nationality	Name	To	End date	Ref.
1 July 2021	MF	(Slovakia)	Marián Chobot	(Slovakia) Zlaté Moravce	30 June 2022	
3 July 2021	FW	(Slovenia)	Žan Medved	(Slovenia) Celje	30 June 2022	
14 July 2021	FW	(Slovenia)	Alen Ožbolt	(Israel) Hapoel Haifa	30 June 2022	
21 July 2021	DF	(Slovenia)	Kenan Bajrić	(Cyprus) Pafos	30 June 2022	
23 July 2021	MF	(Czech Republic)	Erik Daniel	(Poland) Zagłębie Lubin	30 June 2022	
6 January 2022	MF	(Slovakia)	Filip Lichý	(Slovakia) Ružomberok	30 June 2022	
20 January 2022	MF	(Netherlands)	Joeri de Kamps	(Netherlands) Sparta Rotterdam	30 June 2022	
21 January 2022	FW	(Nigeria)	Ezekiel Henty	(Saudi Arabia) Al-Hazem	30 June 2022	
1 February 2022	MF	(Serbia)	Dejan Dražić	(Hungary) Honvéd	30 June 2022	

== Friendlies ==
Win Draw Loss

=== Pre-season ===
As part of the pre-season preparation, the club announced it would complete two training camps. One fitness training camp in Šamorín and then a training camp in Bad Tatzmannsdorf, Austria, where Slovan did participate in three pre-season fixtures. The final pre-season match was played in Bratislava.

Sunday, 20 June 2021	Kapfenberger SV (Austria)	1–4	(Slovakia) Slovan Bratislava	Oberwart, Austria
17:00 CEST (UTC+02:00)	Cetina 15' (pen.)	Report	Lichý 17'; Dražić 19'; Hrnčár 54'; Čavrić 77'

Thursday, 24 June 2021	Orenburg (Russia)	0–1	(Slovakia) Slovan Bratislava	Enzesfeld-Lindabrunn, Austria
17:00 CEST (UTC+02:00)		Report	Ratão 15'

Saturday, 26 June 2021	Admira Wacker (Austria)	0–4	(Slovakia) Slovan Bratislava	Bad Blumau, Austria
16:30 CEST (UTC+02:00)		Report	Hrnčár 7', 20'; Kankava 23'; Henty 55'

Wednesday, 30 June 2021	Slovan Bratislava (Slovakia)	1–1	(Czech Republic) Zlín	Bratislava, Slovakia
20:00 CEST (UTC+02:00)	De Marco 62'	Report	Poznar 33'	Stadium: Tehelné pole

=== Mid-season ===
As part of the first block of the mid-season preparation, focused mainly on fitness, Slovan were to play one friendly match, but it was cancelled due to COVID-19 related issues. Subsequently, Slovan moved to Dubai, where they played three friendly matches. After returning home, the team played one more match.

Friday, 21 January 2022	Slovan Bratislava (Slovakia)	Cancelled	(Slovakia) Podbrezová	Bratislava, Slovakia
13:00 CET (UTC+01:00)				Stadium: ŠK Slovan Academy
Note: The match was cancelled due to the spread of COVID-19 in the away team.

Tuesday, 25 January 2022	Riga (Latvia)	2–1	(Slovakia) Slovan Bratislava	Dubai, UAE
13:00 CET (UTC+01:00)	Loukili 6' (pen.); Krancmanis 62'	Report	Weiss Jr. 63'

Friday, 28 January 2022	Spartak Moscow (Russia)	2–2	(Slovakia) Slovan Bratislava	Dubai, UAE
14:00 CET (UTC+01:00)	Denisov 20'; Bakayev 40'	Report	Weiss Jr. 60'; Čavrić 87'

Tuesday, 1 February 2022	Ararat-Armenia	2–3	(Slovakia) Slovan Bratislava	Dubai, UAE
13:00 CET (UTC+01:00)	Ambartsumyan 32'; Lima 67'	Report	Weiss Jr. 59' (pen.); Mráz 73'; Zmrhal 75'

Saturday, 5 February 2022	Slovan Bratislava (Slovakia)	1–2	(Slovakia) Sereď	Bratislava, Slovakia
13:00 CET (UTC+01:00)	Barseghyan 20'	Report	Haša 30', 53'	Stadium: Pasienky

== Competition overview ==
Competition	First match	Last match	Starting round	Final position	Record							
Competition	First match	Last match	Starting round	Final position	Pld	W	D	L	GF	GA	GD	Win %
Fortuna liga	24 July 2021	21 May 2022	Matchday 1	1st	32	22	8	2	71	25	+46	68.75
Slovak Cup	4 September 2021	8 May 2022	Second round	Runners-up	8	6	1	1	21	3	+18	75.00
Champions League	7 July 2021	28 July 2021	First qualifying round	Second qualifying round	4	1	1	2	5	5	+0	25.00
Europa League	5 August 2021	26 August 2021	Third qualifying round	Play-off round	4	1	2	1	6	7	−1	25.00
Europa Conference League	16 September 2021	9 December 2021	Group stage	Group stage	6	2	2	2	8	7	+1	33.33
Total					54	32	14	8	111	47	+64	59.26

Source: Competitions

== Fortuna liga ==
=== League table ===
==== Regular stage ====
Pos	Team	Pld	W	D	L	GF	GA	GD	Pts	Qualification
1	Slovan Bratislava	22	16	5	1	52	16	+36	53	Qualification for the championship group
2	Spartak Trnava	22	13	6	3	29	12	+17	45	Qualification for the championship group
3	Ružomberok	22	11	8	3	39	17	+22	41	Qualification for the championship group
4	DAC Dunajská Streda	22	10	6	6	28	23	+5	36	Qualification for the championship group
5	Sereď	22	9	5	8	28	28	0	32	Qualification for the championship group
6	Žilina	22	8	6	8	34	33	+1	30	Qualification for the championship group

Source: Niké liga (in Slovak)
Rules for classification: 1) Points; 2) Head-to-head points; 3) Head-to-head goal difference; 4) Head-to-head away goals scored; 5) Play-off.

==== Championship group ====
Pos	Team	Pld	W	D	L	GF	GA	GD	Pts	Qualification	SLO	RUŽ	TRN	DAC	SER	ŽIL
1	Slovan Bratislava (C)	32	22	8	2	71	25	+46	74	Qualification for the Champions League first qualifying round	—	1–1	1–0	3–1	5–1	2–2
2	Ružomberok	32	17	12	3	58	23	+35	63	Qualification for the Europa Conference League first qualifying round	0–0	—	0–0	4–1	3–1	3–0
3	Spartak Trnava	32	17	9	6	36	17	+19	60	Qualification for the Europa Conference League second qualifying round (Note: Spartak Trnava qualified for the Europa Conference League second qualifying round as the 2021–22 Slovak Cup winners.)	0–1	0–0	—	1–0	0–1	1–0
4	DAC Dunajská Streda (O)	32	12	10	10	39	37	+2	46	Qualification for the Europa Conference League play-offs	2–0	2–3	1–1	—	0–0	2–0
5	Sereď (R)	32	10	9	13	34	46	−12	39	Relegation (Note: Sereď did not obtain a license for the next season and were automatically relegated.)	0–3	1–3	0–2	0–0	—	1–1
6	Žilina	32	8	10	14	43	52	−9	34	Qualification for the Europa Conference League play-offs	2–3	0–2	1–2	2–2	1–1	—

Source: Niké liga (in Slovak)
Legend: Blue = home team win; Yellow = draw; Red = away team win.
Rules for classification: 1) Points; 2) Head-to-head points; 3) Head-to-head goal difference; 4) Head-to-head away goals scored; 5) Play-off.
(C) Champions; (O) Play-off winners; (R) Relegated

=== Results summary ===
Overall								Home						Away					
Pld	W	D	L	GF	GA	GD	Pts	W	D	L	GF	GA	GD	W	D	L	GF	GA	GD
32	22	8	2	71	25	+46	74	11	5	0	40	10	+30	11	3	2	31	15	+16

=== Results by matchday ===
Round	1	2	3	4	5	6	7	8	9	10	11	12	13	14	15	16	17	18	19	20	21	22	23	24	25	26	27	28	29	30	31	32
Ground	A	H	A	H	A	H	A	H	A	H	A	H	A	H	A	H	A	H	A	H	A	H	A	H	H	A	H	A	A	H	A	H
Result	W	W	L	W	W	W	D	D	W	W	W	W	W	W	W	W	W	D	D	W	W	D	W	D	W	W	W	D	L	W	W	D
Position	2	1	3	1	2	1	1	1	1	1	1	1	1	1	1	1	1	1	1	1	1	1	1	1	1	1	1	1	1	1	1	1

A = Away; H = Home; W = Win; D = Draw; L = Loss

=== Matches ===
Regular stage

Saturday, 24 July 2021 1	Tatran Liptovský Mikuláš	1–4	Slovan Bratislava	Poprad
18:00 CEST (UTC+02:00)	Pinte 68'	Report	Krčík 22' (o.g.); Lichý 72'; Abena 78'; Ratão 90+2'	Stadium: NTC Poprad; Attendance: 1,000

Saturday, 31 July 2021 2	Slovan Bratislava	2–0	Trenčín	Bratislava
20:00 CEST (UTC+02:00)	Weiss Jr. 61' (pen.); Zmrhal 67'	Report	Lavrinčík (yellow card) 37' (yellow-red card) 55'	Stadium: Tehelné pole Attendance: 2,889

Saturday, 14 August 2021 4	Slovan Bratislava	3–1	Zemplín Michalovce	Bratislava
18:00 CEST (UTC+02:00)	Čavrić 1'; Weiss Jr. 49' (pen.); Zmrhal 74'	Report	Oshima 14'	Stadium: Tehelné pole Attendance: 2,585

Sunday, 22 August 2021 5	Sereď	0–1	Slovan Bratislava	Trnava
18:00 CEST (UTC+02:00)		Report	Dražić 1'	Stadium: Štadión Antona Malatinského; Attendance: 328

Sunday, 29 August 2021 6	Slovan Bratislava	4–1	Zlaté Moravce	Bratislava
18:00 CEST (UTC+02:00)	Henty 43', 47', 82'; Čavrić 49'	Report	Ďubek 7'	Stadium: Tehelné pole Attendance: 2,655

Sunday, 12 September 2021 7	DAC Dunajská Streda	1–1	Slovan Bratislava	Dunajská Streda
17:00 CEST (UTC+02:00)	Schäfer 72'	Report	Zmrhal 74'	Stadium: MOL Aréna; Attendance: 7,144

Sunday, 19 September 2021 8	Slovan Bratislava	2–2	Žilina	Bratislava
17:00 CEST (UTC+02:00)	Nemčík 4' (o.g.); Mráz 32'	Report	Bichakhchyan 11' (pen.), 38'	Stadium: Tehelné pole Attendance: 3,812

Wednesday, 22 September 2021 3	Ružomberok	1–0	Slovan Bratislava	Ružomberok
18:00 CEST (UTC+02:00)	Regáli 90'	Report		Stadium: Štadión pod Čebraťom; Attendance: 944

Saturday, 25 September 2021 9	Senica	0–3	Slovan Bratislava	Senica
18:00 CEST (UTC+02:00)		Report	Dražić 2'; Mráz 26', 35'	Stadium: Štadión FK Senica; Attendance: 1,114

Sunday, 3 October 2021 10	Slovan Bratislava	5–1	Pohronie	Bratislava
15:00 CEST (UTC+02:00)	Mráz 24'; De Marco 40'; Henty 42'; Zmrhal 54'; Čmovš 67' (o.g.)	Report	Križan 34' (o.g.)	Stadium: Tehelné pole Attendance: 2,893

Sunday, 17 October 2021 11	Spartak Trnava	0–3 (awd.)	Slovan Bratislava	Trnava
17:00 CEST (UTC+02:00)		Report		Stadium: Štadión Antona Malatinského; Attendance: 9,000
Note: The match was suspended after 15 minutes of play due to the riots of the spectators, who entered the pitch. Subsequently, the match was abandoned by the referee. On 20 October, Slovan were awarded a technical 3–0 victory by the Presidium of the Union of League Clubs, which is the governing organization for the Slovak top level football competition.

Sunday, 24 October 2021 12	Slovan Bratislava	4–0	Tatran Liptovský Mikuláš	Bratislava
15:00 CEST (UTC+02:00)	Mráz (penalty missed) 37'; Henty 57', 83'; Rabiu 67'; Dražić 90'	Report	Bartoš (red card) 35'	Stadium: Tehelné pole Attendance: 2,734

Sunday, 31 October 2021 13	Trenčín	2–3	Slovan Bratislava	Trenčín
17:00 CET (UTC+01:00)	Kadák 42'; Azango 64'	Report	Henty 50', 82'; Zmrhal 52'	Stadium: Štadión Sihoť; Attendance: 1,000

Sunday, 7 November 2021 14	Slovan Bratislava	1–0	Ružomberok	Bratislava
15:00 CET (UTC+01:00)	Zmrhal 12'	Report		Stadium: Tehelné pole Attendance: 3,015

Sunday, 21 November 2021 15	Zemplín Michalovce	1–2	Slovan Bratislava	Michalovce
17:00 CET (UTC+01:00)	Trusa 26'	Report	Henty 16'; Zmrhal 67'; Weiss Jr. (yellow card) 56' (yellow-red card) 87' (second (yellow card) off the pitch)	Stadium: Mestský futbalový štadión Attendance: 100

Monday, 29 November 2021 16	Slovan Bratislava	2–0	Sereď	Bratislava
18:00 CET (UTC+01:00)	Dražić 15' (pen.); Green 71'	Report		Stadium: Tehelné pole Attendance: 0

Friday, 3 December 2021 17	Zlaté Moravce	1–2	Slovan Bratislava	Zlaté Moravce
17:00 CET (UTC+01:00)	Ďubek 90+6'	Report	Rabiu 61'; Weiss Jr. 82'	Stadium: Štadión FC ViOn; Attendance: 0

Sunday, 12 December 2021 18	Slovan Bratislava	0–0	DAC Dunajská Streda	Bratislava
17:00 CET (UTC+01:00)		Report		Stadium: Tehelné pole Attendance: 0

Sunday, 19 December 2021 19	Žilina	1–1	Slovan Bratislava	Žilina
17:00 CET (UTC+01:00)	Anang 73'	Report	Mráz 21'	Stadium: Štadión pod Dubňom; Attendance: 0

Saturday, 12 February 2022 20	Slovan Bratislava	5–0	Senica	Bratislava
15:00 CET (UTC+01:00)	Mustafić 14'; Bozhikov 36'; Kankava 55'; Šaponjić 75'; Rabiu 90'	Report		Stadium: Tehelné pole Attendance: 2,829

Saturday, 19 February 2022 21	Pohronie	3–4	Slovan Bratislava	Žiar nad Hronom
15:00 CET (UTC+01:00)	Ožvolda 3'; Mihalík 18' (pen.), 41' (pen.)	Report	Green 49'; Šaponjić 54'; Kashia 62'; Weiss Jr. 64'	Stadium: Futbalový štadión Žiar nad Hronom; Attendance: 570

Saturday, 26 February 2022 22	Slovan Bratislava	0–0	Spartak Trnava	Bratislava
17:00 CET (UTC+01:00)		Report		Stadium: Tehelné pole Attendance: 7,533

Championship group

Sunday, 6 March 2022 23 / Championship group round 1	Žilina	2–3	Slovan Bratislava	Žilina
17:00 CET (UTC+01:00)	Kopas 42' (pen.); Ďuriš 60'	Report	Weiss Jr. 45' (pen.), 75'; Mráz 81'	Stadium: Štadión pod Dubňom; Attendance: 1,167

Saturday, 12 March 2022 24 / 2	Slovan Bratislava	1–1	Ružomberok	Bratislava
15:00 CET (UTC+01:00)	Weiss Jr. 5'	Report	Rymarenko 90+3'	Stadium: Tehelné pole Attendance: 3,186

Saturday, 19 March 2022 25 / 3	Slovan Bratislava	5–1	Sereď	Bratislava
15:00 CET (UTC+01:00)	Kashia 40'; Barseghyan 54'; Šaponjić 60'; Green 81', 84'	Report	Yao 8'	Stadium: Tehelné pole Attendance: 3,018

Sunday, 3 April 2022 26 / 4	Spartak Trnava	0–1	Slovan Bratislava	Trnava
17:00 CEST (UTC+02:00)	Škrtel (red card) 57'	Report	Šaponjić 84'	Stadium: Štadión Antona Malatinského; Attendance: 5,467

Sunday, 10 April 2022 27 / 5	Slovan Bratislava	3–1	DAC Dunajská Streda	Bratislava
17:00 CEST (UTC+02:00)	Zmrhal 27'; Rabiu 46'; Mustafić 58'	Report	Zuberu 90+2'	Stadium: Tehelné pole Attendance: 6,134

Friday, 15 April 2022 28 / 6	Ružomberok	0–0	Slovan Bratislava	Ružomberok
17:00 CEST (UTC+02:00)	Maslo (red card) 55'	Report		Stadium: Štadión pod Čebraťom; Attendance: 2,928

Sunday, 24 April 2022 29 / 7	DAC Dunajská Streda	2–0	Slovan Bratislava	Dunajská Streda
19:30 CEST (UTC+02:00)	Balogh 45+1'; Krstović 70'	Report		Stadium: MOL Aréna; Attendance: 6,290

Sunday, 1 May 2022 30 / 8	Slovan Bratislava	1–0	Spartak Trnava	Bratislava
20:00 CEST (UTC+02:00)	Čavrić 1'	Report		Stadium: Tehelné pole Attendance: 5,601

Saturday, 14 May 2022 31 / 9	Sereď	0–3	Slovan Bratislava	Trnava
17:00 CEST (UTC+02:00)		Report	Barseghyan 34', 65'; Mráz 78'	Stadium: Štadión Antona Malatinského; Attendance: 133

Saturday, 21 May 2022 32 / 10	Slovan Bratislava	2–2	Žilina	Bratislava
17:00 CEST (UTC+02:00)	Barseghyan 45+1'; Mráz 71'	Report	Iľko 4'; Ďuriš 35'	Stadium: Tehelné pole Attendance: 5,617

== Slovak Cup ==
Saturday, 4 September 2021 Second round	Jednota Málinec (4)	0–7	Slovan Bratislava (1)	Málinec
16:00 CEST (UTC+02:00)		Report	Green 30', 35', 53'; Da Silva 41'; Dražić 50'; Mustafić 61'; Hubert 81'	Attendance: 986

Saturday, 9 October 2021 Third round	Prameň Kováčová (3)	0–2	Slovan Bratislava (1)	Kováčová
14:00 CEST (UTC+02:00)		Report	Hrnčár 14'; Dražić 59'	Attendance: 1,495

Wednesday, 27 October 2021 Fourth round	Slávia TU Košice (3)	0–5	Slovan Bratislava (1)	Košice
14:30 CEST (UTC+02:00)		Report	Dražić 25', 48', 57'; Mráz 55'; Vojtko 79'	Stadium: Štadión TU Watsonova; Attendance: 650

Tuesday, 1 March 2022 Round of 16	Ružomberok (1)	0–2	Slovan Bratislava (1)	Ružomberok
14:00 CET (UTC+01:00)	Kochan (penalty missed) 37'	Report	Green 62', 87'; De Marco (yellow card) 76' (yellow-red card) 79'	Stadium: Štadión pod Čebraťom; Attendance: 961

Tuesday, 15 March 2022 Quarter-finals	Slovan Bratislava (1)	2–0	Zlaté Moravce (1)	Bratislava
16:00 CET (UTC+01:00)	Weiss Jr. 53'; Zmrhal 73'	Report		Stadium: Tehelné pole Attendance: 1,327

Thursday, 7 April 2022 Semi-finals First leg	Trenčín (1)	0–0	Slovan Bratislava (1)	Trenčín
19:45 CEST (UTC+02:00)		Report	Barseghyan (red card) 87'	Stadium: Štadión Sihoť; Attendance: 1,448

Tuesday, 19 April 2022 Semi-finals Second leg	Slovan Bratislava (1)	2–1 (2–1 agg.)	Trenčín (1)	Bratislava
19:30 CEST (UTC+02:00)	Agbo 9'; Mustafić 40'	Report	Ikoba 69'	Stadium: Tehelné pole Attendance: 1,644

Sunday, 8 May 2022 Final	Slovan Bratislava (1)	1–2 (a.e.t.)	Spartak Trnava (1)	Bratislava
17:30 CEST (UTC+02:00)	Mustafić 49'	Report	Bukata 52'; Azevedo 114'	Stadium: Tehelné pole Attendance: 10,411

== UEFA Champions League ==
=== First qualifying round ===
The draw for the first qualifying round was held on 15 June 2021.

Wednesday, 7 July 2021 First leg	Slovan Bratislava (Slovakia)	2–0	(Republic of Ireland) Shamrock Rovers	Bratislava, Slovakia
18:30 CEST (UTC+02:00)	Ratão 28', 47'; Weiss Jr. (penalty missed) 90+5'	Report (UEFA); Report (Slovan)		Stadium: Tehelné pole Attendance: 500; Referee: Sebastian Gishamer (Austria)

Tuesday, 13 July 2021 Second leg	Shamrock Rovers (Republic of Ireland)	2–1 (2–3 agg.)	(Slovakia) Slovan Bratislava	Dublin, Ireland
21:00 CEST (UTC+02:00)	Burke 16' (pen.); Towell 64'	Report (UEFA); Report (Slovan)	Weiss Jr. 73'	Stadium: Tallaght Stadium; Attendance: 1,500 (Note: Limited capacity due to preventive measures against the COVID-19 pandemic.); Referee: Mario Zebec (Croatia)

=== Second qualifying round ===
The draw for the second qualifying round was held on 16 June 2021.

Wednesday, 21 July 2021 First leg	Slovan Bratislava (Slovakia)	0–0	(Switzerland) Young Boys	Bratislava, Slovakia
20:30 CEST (UTC+02:00)		Report (UEFA); Report (Slovan)		Stadium: Tehelné pole Attendance: 1,000; Referee: Chris Kavanagh (England)

Wednesday, 28 July 2021 Second leg	Young Boys (Switzerland)	3–2 (3–2 agg.)	(Slovakia) Slovan Bratislava	Bern, Switzerland
20:15 CEST (UTC+02:00)	Siebatcheu 10' (pen.); Garcia 24'; Aebischer 49'	Report (UEFA); Report (Slovan)	Ratão (penalty missed) 21'; Kanga 60' (o.g.); Henty 62'	Stadium: Wankdorf Stadium; Attendance: 19,564; Referee: Irfan Peljto (Bosnia and Herzegovina)

== UEFA Europa League ==
=== Third qualifying round ===
The draw for the third qualifying round was held on 19 July 2021.

Thursday, 5 August 2021 First leg	Lincoln Red Imps (Gibraltar)	1–3	(Slovakia) Slovan Bratislava	Gibraltar
18:00 CEST (UTC+02:00)	Walker 73' (pen.)	Report (UEFA); Report (Slovan)	Kashia 16'; Zmrhal 48'; Henty 69'	Stadium: Victoria Stadium; Attendance: 637; Referee: Ioannis Papadopoulos (Greece)

Tuesday, 10 August 2021 Second leg	Slovan Bratislava (Slovakia)	1–1 (4–2 agg.)	(Gibraltar) Lincoln Red Imps	Bratislava, Slovakia
20:30 CEST (UTC+02:00)	Zmrhal 38'; De Marco (yellow card) 28' (yellow-red card) 54'	Report (UEFA); Report (Slovan)	K. Gómez 90'	Stadium: Tehelné pole Attendance: 4,688; Referee: Trustin Farrugia Cann (Malta)

=== Play-off round ===
The draw for the third qualifying round was held on 2 August 2021.

Thursday, 19 August 2021 First leg	Olympiacos (Greece)	3–0	(Slovakia) Slovan Bratislava	Piraeus, Greece
21:00 CEST (UTC+02:00)	M. Camara 37'; Cissé 52'; Bozhikov 68' (o.g.)	Report (UEFA); Report (Slovan)		Stadium: Karaiskakis Stadium; Attendance: 9,823; Referee: Marco Guida (Italy)

Thursday, 26 August 2021 Second leg	Slovan Bratislava (Slovakia)	2–2 (2–5 agg.)	(Greece) Olympiacos	Bratislava, Slovakia
20:45 CEST (UTC+02:00)	De Marco (red card) 26'; Henty 42'; Green 62'	Report (UEFA); Report (Slovan)	El-Arabi 33'; Onyekuru 54'	Stadium: Tehelné pole Attendance: 7,201; Referee: Deniz Aytekin (Germany)

== UEFA Europa Conference League ==
=== Group stage ===
The draw for the group stage was held on 27 August 2021 with the fixtures announced on a day later.

Pos	Team	Pld	W	D	L	GF	GA	GD	Pts	Qualification	COP	PAO	SLO	LIN
1	(Denmark) Copenhagen	6	5	0	1	15	5	+10	15	Advance to round of 16	—	1–2	2–0	3–1
2	(Greece) PAOK	6	3	2	1	8	4	+4	11	Advance to knockout round play-offs	1–2	—	1–1	2–0
3	(Slovakia) Slovan Bratislava	6	2	2	2	8	7	+1	8		1–3	0–0	—	2–0
4	(Gibraltar) Lincoln Red Imps	6	0	0	6	2	17	−15	0		0–4	0–2	1–4	—

Source: UEFA
Rules for classification: Group stage tiebreakers

==== Results by matchday ====
Round	1	2	3	4	5	6
Ground	H	A	H	A	H	A
Result	L	D	W	W	D	L
Position	3	3	3	2	2	3

A = Away; H = Home; W = Win; D = Draw; L = Loss

==== Matches ====
Thursday, 16 September 2021 1	Slovan Bratislava (Slovakia)	1–3	(Denmark) Copenhagen	Bratislava, Slovakia
18:45 CEST (UTC+02:00)	Henty 21'	Report (UEFA); Report (Slovan)	Wind 18', 68' (pen.); Stage 41'	Stadium: Tehelné pole Attendance: 9,833; Referee: Michael Fabbri (Italy)

Thursday, 30 September 2021 2	PAOK (Greece)	1–1	(Slovakia) Slovan Bratislava	Thessaloniki, Greece
21:00 CEST (UTC+02:00)	Akpom 9'	Report (UEFA); Report (Slovan)	Green 15'	Stadium: Toumba Stadium; Attendance: 7,537; Referee: João Pinheiro (Portugal)

Thursday, 21 October 2021 3	Slovan Bratislava (Slovakia)	2–0	(Gibraltar) Lincoln Red Imps	Bratislava, Slovakia
21:00 CEST (UTC+02:00)	Green 46'; Henty 84'	Report (UEFA); Report (Slovan)		Stadium: Tehelné pole Attendance: 6,108; Referee: Vilhjamur Thórarinsson (Iceland)

Thursday, 4 November 2021 4	Lincoln Red Imps (Gibraltar)	1–4	(Slovakia) Slovan Bratislava	Gibraltar
18:45 CET (UTC+01:00)	R. Chipolina 45+3'	Report (UEFA); Report (Slovan)	Green 17', 25'; Čavrić 67'; Mráz 71'	Stadium: Victoria Stadium; Attendance: 553; Referee: Kristoffer Karlsson (Sweden)

Thursday, 25 November 2021 5	Slovan Bratislava (Slovakia)	0–0	(Greece) PAOK	Bratislava, Slovakia
18:45 CET (UTC+01:00)		Report (UEFA); Report (Slovan)		Stadium: Tehelné pole Attendance: 0 Referee: Dennis Higler (Netherlands)

Thursday, 9 December 2021 6	Copenhagen (Denmark)	2–0	(Slovakia) Slovan Bratislava	Copenhagen, Denmark
21:00 CET (UTC+01:00)	Wind 30'; Højlund 53'	Report (UEFA); Report (Slovan)		Stadium: Parken Stadium; Attendance: 13,021; Referee: István Vad (Hungary)

== Statistics ==
=== Goalscorers ===
As of match played 21 May 2022

No.	Pos.	Nat.	Name	Fortuna liga	Slovak Cup	Champions League	Europa League	Europa Conference League	Total
3	MF	(Nigeria)	Uche Agbo		1				1
4	DF	(Georgia (country))	Guram Kashia	2			1		3
7	MF	(Slovakia)	Vladimír Weiss Jr.	7	1	1			9
9	FW	(Nigeria)	Ezekiel Henty	9		1	2	2	14
9	FW	(Serbia)	Ivan Šaponjić	4					4
10	MF	(Nigeria)	Ibrahim Rabiu	4					4
11	MF	(Armenia)	Tigran Barseghyan	4					4
12	FW	(Slovakia)	Martin Hubert		1				1
13	MF	(Serbia)	Dejan Dražić	4	5				9
14	DF	(Suriname)	Myenty Abena	1					1
16	MF	(Bosnia and Herzegovina)	Alen Mustafić	2	3				5
18	MF	(Slovakia)	David Hrnčár		1				1
19	MF	(England)	Andre Green	5	5		1	4	15
20	MF	(Georgia (country))	Jaba Kankava	1					1
21	FW	(Brazil)	Rafael Ratão	1		2			3
21	MF	(Czech Republic)	Jaromír Zmrhal	8	1		2		11
26	MF	(Slovakia)	Filip Lichý	1					1
27	DF	(Slovakia)	Matúš Vojtko		1				1
28	FW	(Switzerland)	Adler Da Silva		1				1
29	DF	(Bulgaria)	Vasil Bozhikov	1					1
33	FW	(Slovakia)	Samuel Mráz	7	1			1	9
77	MF	(Serbia)	Aleksandar Čavrić	3				1	4
81	DF	(Slovakia)	Vernon De Marco	1					1
Own goals				3		1			4
Awarded				3					3
Total				71	21	5	6	8	111

=== Clean sheets ===
As of match played 21 May 2022

No.	Nat.	Name	Fortuna liga	Slovak Cup	Champions League	Europa League	Europa Conference League	Total
1	(Slovakia)	Adrián Chovan	8	5	2		2	17
30	(Slovakia)	Michal Šulla	5					5
35	(Slovakia)	Adam Hrdina	1	1				2
Total			14	6	2	0	2	24

=== Disciplinary record ===
As of match played 21 May 2022

No.	Pos.	Nat.	Name	Fortuna liga			Slovak Cup			Champions League			Europa League			Europa Conference League			Total		
No.	Pos.	Nat.	Name	Yellow card	(yellow card) (yellow-red card)	Red card	Yellow card	(yellow card) (yellow-red card)	Red card	Yellow card	(yellow card) (yellow-red card)	Red card	Yellow card	(yellow card) (yellow-red card)	Red card	Yellow card	(yellow card) (yellow-red card)	Red card	Yellow card	(yellow card) (yellow-red card)	Red card
3	MF	(Nigeria)	Uche Agbo	1			1									1			3	0	0
4	DF	(Georgia (country))	Guram Kashia	2						1			1						4	0	0
5	DF	(Slovakia)	Richard Križan	2															2	0	0
6	MF	(Netherlands)	Joeri de Kamps							2						1			3	0	0
7	MF	(Slovakia)	Vladimír Weiss Jr.	6	1		1			1			2						10	1	0
8	MF	(Hungary)	Dávid Holman	1															1	0	0
9	FW	(Nigeria)	Ezekiel Henty	2						2						3			7	0	0
9	FW	(Serbia)	Ivan Šaponjić	2			1												3	0	0
10	MF	(Nigeria)	Ibrahim Rabiu	7			1			1									9	0	0
11	MF	(Armenia)	Tigran Barseghyan				1		1										1	0	1
13	MF	(Serbia)	Dejan Dražić													1			1	0	0
14	DF	(Suriname)	Myenty Abena	1			1									1			3	0	0
16	MF	(Bosnia and Herzegovina)	Alen Mustafić	4			2												6	0	0
17	DF	(Czech Republic)	Jurij Medveděv													1			1	0	0
18	MF	(Slovakia)	David Hrnčár	1															1	0	0
19	MF	(England)	Andre Green	1			1												2	0	0
20	MF	(Georgia (country))	Jaba Kankava	6			3			1			1			1			12	0	0
21	MF	(Czech Republic)	Jaromír Zmrhal	1															1	0	0
25	DF	(Slovakia)	Lukáš Pauschek	2															2	0	0
29	DF	(Bulgaria)	Vasil Bozhikov	1									1			3			5	0	0
33	FW	(Slovakia)	Samuel Mráz													1			1	0	0
36	DF	(Brazil)	Lucas Lovat	3															3	0	0
77	MF	(Serbia)	Aleksandar Čavrić													1			1	0	0
81	DF	(Slovakia)	Vernon De Marco	5			1	1		1			1	1	1				8	2	1
Total				48	1	0	13	1	1	9	0	0	6	1	1	14	0	0	90	3	2

=== Attendances ===
	Matches	Attendances	Average	High	Low
Fortuna liga	16	54,501	3,406	7,533	0
Slovak Cup	2	2,971	1,486	1,644	1,327
Champions League	2	1,500	750	1,000	500
Europa League	2	11,889	5,945	7,201	4,688
Europa Conference League	3	15,941	5,314	9,833	0
Total	25	86,802	3,472	9,833	0

== Awards ==
=== Fortuna liga Player of the Month ===
Month	Player	Ref
March	(Slovakia) Vladimír Weiss Jr.	

=== Fortuna liga Team of the Season ===
Position	Player	Ref
DF	(Georgia (country)) Guram Kashia	
MF	(Nigeria) Ibrahim Rabiu	
MF	(Georgia (country)) Jaba Kankava	
MF	(Slovakia) Vladimír Weiss Jr.	

=== Fortuna liga Player of the Season ===
Season	Player	Ref
2021–22	(Slovakia) Vladimír Weiss Jr.	

=== Fortuna liga Manager of the Season ===
Season	Manager	Ref
2021–22	(Slovakia) Vladimír Weiss	

=== Fortuna liga Under-21 Team of the Season ===
Position	Player	Ref
MF	(Slovakia) Filip Lichý	
