= Filip Lichý =

Slovak footballer

Personal information
- Full name: Filip Lichý
- Date of birth: 25 January 2001 (age 25)
- Place of birth: Banská Bystrica, Slovakia
- Height: 1.87 m (6 ft 2 in)
- Position: Midfielder

Team information
- Current team: FC Košice
- Number: 6

Youth career
- 2008–2016: Dukla Banská Bystrica
- 2017–2020: Slovan Bratislava

Senior career*
Years	Team	Apps	(Gls)
2019−2026	Slovan Bratislava B	16	(4)
2020−2026	Slovan Bratislava	43	(2)
2022	→ Ružomberok (loan)	20	(3)
2024–2025	→ Dukla Prague (loan)	23	(1)
2026	→ FC Košice (loan)	13	(3)
2026-	FC Košice	8	(1)

International career^{‡}
2017	Slovakia U17	6	(0)
2019	Slovakia U18	1	(1)
2019	Slovakia U19	7	(2)
2021−	Slovakia U21	10	(1)
- * Club domestic league appearances and goals as of 21 September 2026 ‡ National team caps and goals as of 14:47, 8 June 2022 (UTC)

Filip Lichý (born 25 January 2001) is a Slovak footballer who plays for FC Košice of the Niké Liga as a midfielder.

== Club career ==
=== Slovan Bratislava ===
Lichý, as a result of their academy, was promoted to the first team of Slovan Bratislava in the winter of 2019-2020. He made his professional Fortuna Liga debut for Slovan against AS Trenčín on 22 February 2020, in a home fixture at Tehelné pole. Lichý came on as a replacement for Dávid Holman after 82 minutes, with the final score (2:0 win) already set earlier by Vernon De Marco and Rafael Ratão.

In the next round, Lichý made his starting-XI debut, in an away fixture at pod Zoborom, against Nitra. Slovan won the game narrowly 0:1, despite the 36 point gap in the league table at the time, with Moha scoring the only goal of the match. After the match Slovan's manager, Ján Kozák Jr. praised Lichý's performance, citing that he earned the cap by hard work during the winter preparation. Lichý had commented that he was nervous at the start but was grateful for the support of his quality team-mates, allowing him to play with ease.

However, Lichý ultimately missed most of 2020 as a result of an anterior cruciate ligament injury.

In the winter of 2021-22, Lichý was loaned to Ružomberok until the end of the season. This loan was extended by another year in July 2022, allowing Lichý to feature for Ružomberok in Europa Conference League qualifiers. Lichý returned to Slovan Bratislava in December 2022.

In July 2024, Lichý joined Czech First League club Dukla Prague on a season-long loan deal with an option to buy.

== Career statistics ==
As of match played 14 December 2025

Appearances and goals by club, season and competition
Club	Season	League			Cup		Europe		Other		Total	
Club	Season	Division	Apps	Goals	Apps	Goals	Apps	Goals	Apps	Goals	Apps	Goals
Slovan Bratislava B	2019–20	2. Liga	1	0	—		—		—		1	0
Slovan Bratislava B	2020–21	2. Liga	4	0	—		—		—		4	0
Slovan Bratislava B	2021–22	2. Liga	5	2	—		—		—		5	2
Slovan Bratislava B	2022–23	2. Liga	2	0	—		—		—		2	0
Slovan Bratislava B	2023–24	2. Liga	4	2	—		—		—		4	2
Slovan Bratislava B	Total		16	4	—		—		—		16	4
Slovan Bratislava	2019–20	Slovak First Football League	3	0	1	0	—		—		4	0
Slovan Bratislava	2020–21	Slovak First Football League	1	1	0	0	—		—		1	1
Slovan Bratislava	2021–22	Slovak First Football League	12	1	0	0	5 (Note: Two appearances in UEFA Champions League and UEFA Conference League, one appearance in UEFA Europa League)	0	—		17	1
Slovan Bratislava	2022–23	Slovak First Football League	5	0	4	0	2 (Note: Appearances in UEFA Conference League)	0	—		11	0
Slovan Bratislava	2023–24	Slovak First Football League	14	0	3	0	5 (Note: Three appearances in UEFA Champions League, one appearance in UEFA Europa League, one appearance in UEFA Conference League)	0	—		22	0
Slovan Bratislava	2024–25	Slovak First Football League	0	0	0	0	0 (Note: Appearances in UEFA Champions League)	0	—		0	0
Slovan Bratislava	2025–26	Slovak First Football League	8	0	2	1	0	0	—		10	1
Slovan Bratislava	Total		43	2	10	1	12	0	—		65	3
Ružomberok (loan)	2021–22	Slovak First Football League	10	2	—		—		—		10	2
Ružomberok (loan)	2022–23	Slovak First Football League	10	1	3	1	4	0	—		17	2
Ružomberok (loan)	Total		20	3	3	1	4	0	—		27	4
Dukla Prague (loan)	2024–25	Czech First League	23	1	1	0	—		2 (Note: Appearance in relegation play-offs)	0	26	1
Career total			102	10	14	2	16	0	2	0	134	12

== Honours ==
=== Club ===
Slovan Bratislava

- Niké Liga (3): 2019–20, 2020–21, 2022–23
- Slovnaft Cup (1): 2019–20

=== Individual ===
- Slovak Super Liga U-21 Team of the Season: 2021–22
