= Myenty Abena =

Surinamese footballer (born 1994)

Personal information
- Full name: Leo Myenty Janna Abena
- Date of birth: 12 December 1994 (age 31)
- Place of birth: Paramaribo, Suriname
- Height: 1.91 m (6 ft 3 in)
- Position: Centre-back

Team information
- Current team: Gaziantep
- Number: 14

Youth career
- 2008–2016: Utrecht

Senior career*
Years	Team	Apps	(Gls)
2016–2017	Jong Utrecht	33	(2)
2017–2018	De Graafschap	39	(0)
2019	Spartak Trnava	14	(0)
2019–2022	Slovan Bratislava	69	(3)
2023–2024	Ferencváros	27	(3)
2024–2025	Spartak Moscow	7	(0)
2025–	Gaziantep	24	(1)

International career^{‡}
2021–	Suriname	35	(1)
- * Club domestic league appearances and goals as of 10 June 2026 ‡ National team caps and goals as of 5 October 2026 (UTC)

Leo Myenty Janna Abena (born 12 December 1994) is a Surinamese professional footballer for Turkish club Gaziantep and the Suriname national team.

== Club career ==
He made his professional debut in the Eerste Divisie for Jong FC Utrecht on 26 August 2016 in a game against Jong PSV.

=== Spartak Trnava ===
In January 2019, Abena joined Slovak side Spartak Trnava, domestic reigning champions.

On 1 May 2019, Abena won the Slovak Cup with Spartak Trnava, scoring the last penalty in the penalty shoot-out, after the match ended up 3–3 after extra–time.

=== Slovan Bratislava ===
In June 2019, Abena signed a 4–year contract with Slovan Bratislava, the main rivals of his previous employer.

In the 2019–20 season, he completed the domestic double with Slovan by winning the Slovak Super Liga and Slovak Cup. He remained part of the team, which had repeated the double in the following season.

=== Ferencváros ===
On 5 May 2023, he won the 2022–23 Nemzeti Bajnokság I with Ferencváros, after Kecskemét lost 1–0 to Honvéd at the Bozsik Aréna on the 30th matchday.

On 20 April 2024, the Ferencváros–Kisvárda tie ended with a goalless draw at the Groupama Aréna on the 29th match day of the 2023–24 Nemzeti Bajnokság I season which meant that Ferencváros won their 35th championship.

On 15 May 2024, Ferencváros were defeated by Paks 2–0 in the 2024 Magyar Kupa Final at the Puskás Aréna.

=== Spartak Moscow ===
On 16 August 2024, Abena signed with Spartak Moscow in Russia, reuniting with his former Ferencváros manager Dejan Stanković. On 30 June 2025, his contract with Spartak was terminated by mutual consent.

=== Gaziantep ===
On 1 July 2025, Abena signed a two-year contract with Gaziantep in Turkey.

== International career ==
In October 2020 Abena became eligible to represent Suriname internationally. He made his debut on 24 March 2021 in a World Cup qualifier against the Cayman Islands. He scored his first international goal for Suriname on 15 October 2023 in a Nations League match against Grenada.

== Career statistics ==
As of 4 May 2025

Club	Season	League			Cup		Continental		Other		Total	
Club	Season	Division	Apps	Goals	Apps	Goals	Apps	Goals	Apps	Goals	Apps	Goals
Jong Utrecht	2016–17	Eerste Divisie	33	2	—		—		—		33	2
De Graafschap	2017–18	Eerste Divisie	30	0	1	0	—		—		31	0
De Graafschap	2018–19	Eredivisie	12	0	1	1	—		—		13	1
De Graafschap	Total		42	0	2	1	—		—		44	1
Spartak Trnava	2018–19	Slovak Super Liga	14	0	4	0	—		—		18	0
Slovan Bratislava	2019–20	Slovak Super Liga	18	2	4	0	13	1	—		35	3
Slovan Bratislava	2020–21	Slovak Super Liga	20	0	7	1	1	0	—		28	1
Slovan Bratislava	2021–22	Slovak Super Liga	21	1	7	0	7	0	—		35	1
Slovan Bratislava	2022–23	Slovak Super Liga	10	0	2	0	12	0	—		24	0
Slovan Bratislava	Total		69	3	20	1	33	1	—		122	5
Ferencváros	2022–23	Nemzeti Bajnokság I	10	0	0	0	2	0	—		12	0
Ferencváros	2023–24	Nemzeti Bajnokság I	17	3	4	0	5	0	—		26	3
Ferencváros	Total		27	3	4	0	7	0	—		38	3
Spartak Moscow	2024–25	Russian Premier League	7	0	5	0	—		—		12	0
Career total			192	8	35	2	40	1	0	0	267	11

== Honours ==
Spartak Trnava

- Slovnaft Cup: 2018–19

Slovan Bratislava

- Fortuna Liga: 2019–20, 2020–21, 2021–22
- Slovnaft Cup: 2019–20, 2020–21

Ferencvárosi

- NB I: 2023–24

Individual

- Slovak Super Liga Team of the Season: 2019–20
