= David Strelec =

Slovak footballer (born 2001)

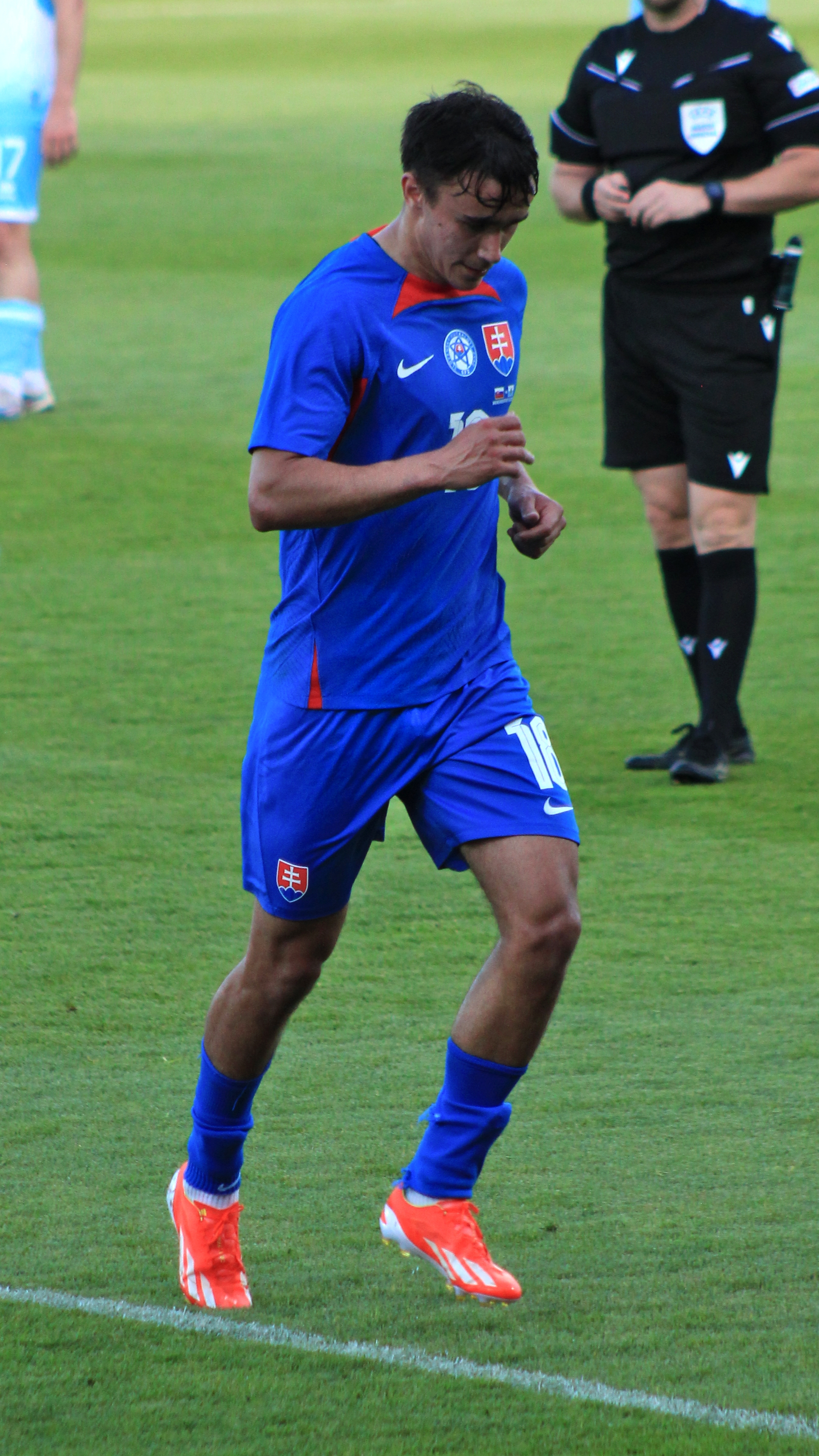
- Strelec playing for Slovakia in 2024

Personal information
- Full name: David Strelec
- Date of birth: 4 April 2001 (age 25)
- Place of birth: Nové Zámky, Slovakia
- Height: 1.85 m (6 ft 1 in)
- Position: Forward

Team information
- Current team: Middlesbrough
- Number: 13

Youth career
- 2007–2018: Slovan Bratislava

Senior career*
Years	Team	Apps	(Gls)
2018–2021	Slovan Bratislava	54	(15)
2021–2024	Spezia	17	(1)
2023	→ Reggina (loan)	15	(3)
2023–2024	→ Slovan Bratislava (loan)	28	(11)
2024–2025	Slovan Bratislava	32	(21)
2025–	Middlesbrough	38	(9)

International career^{‡}
2016–2017	Slovakia U16		
2017–2018	Slovakia U17	11	(4)
2018	Slovakia U18	3	(1)
2018	Slovakia U19	4	(4)
2019–2022	Slovakia U21	13	(7)
2021–	Slovakia	45	(11)
- * Club domestic league appearances and goals as of 18:49, 21 November 2026 (UTC) ‡ National team caps and goals as of 18 November 2026

David Strelec (born 4 April 2001) is a Slovak professional footballer who plays as a forward for EFL Championship club Middlesbrough and the Slovakia national team.

== Club career ==
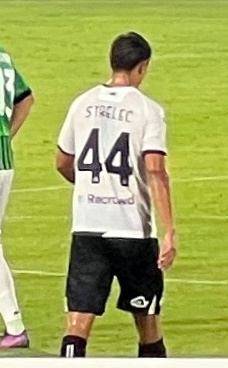
Strelec with Spezia in 2022

Strelec made his Fortuna Liga debut for ŠK Slovan Bratislava against Zemplín Michalovce on 5 August 2018. He transferred to Spezia Calcio in summer 2021, signing a five-year contract on the last day of the transfer window. On 31 January 2023, Strelec joined Serie B club Reggina on loan until the end of the 2022–23 season. Strelec returned to Spezia at the end of his loan. He returned to Slovan Bratislava in summer 2023 on loan with an option to buy, which the club activated in May 2024, giving him a four-year contract.

In the first half of the 2024–25 Slovak First Football League, Strelec scored 11 times in 19 matches. On 5 November 2024, he scored the opening goal in a 1-4 defeat against GNK Dinamo in the UEFA Champions League. Strelec scored another goal in that season's competition against Spanish club Atlético Madrid. In the January 2025 transfer window, Strelec was subject to transfer interest from British clubs, Middlesbrough and Celtic.

On 1 September 2025, Strelec signed for EFL Championship club Middlesbrough on a five-year contract. He was signed for an upfront fee of £6.5 million with a further £2.5 million in add-ons.

== International career ==
In March 2021, Strelec received his first call-up to Slovak senior national team by Štefan Tarkovič for three 2022 FIFA World Cup qualification matches against Cyprus, Malta, and Russia. He made his debut on 24 March in a goalless draw against Cyprus, replacing Ondrej Duda after 83 minutes. He scored his first international goal against Malta, scoring with his head to reduce Malta's lead to 2–1, in a match which finished 2–2.

In November 2024, Strelec scored the only goal of the game in the 72nd minute of a UEFA Nations League match against Estonia in Trnava. This was his 4th goal for Slovakia in the league phase.

== Career statistics ==
=== Club ===
As of match played 21 November 2026

Appearances and goals by club, season and competition
Club	Season	League			National cup (Note: Includes Slovak Cup, Coppa Italia, FA Cup)		League Cup		Europe		Other		Total	
Club	Season	Division	Apps	Goals	Apps	Goals	Apps	Goals	Apps	Goals	Apps	Goals	Apps	Goals
Slovan Bratislava	2018–19	Slovak First League	13	2	—		—		—		—		13	2
Slovan Bratislava	2019–20	Slovak First League	12	4	3	1	—		2 (Note: Appearances in UEFA Europa League)	0	—		17	5
Slovan Bratislava	2020–21	Slovak First League	25	9	4	2	—		—		—		29	11
Slovan Bratislava	2021–22	Slovak First League	4	0	—		—		7 (Note: Three appearances in UEFA Champions League, four appearances in UEFA Europa League)	0	—		11	0
Slovan Bratislava	Total		54	15	7	3	—		9	0	—		70	18
Spezia	2021–22	Serie A	10	1	1	0	—		—		—		11	1
Spezia	2022–23	Serie A	7	0	2	3	—		—		—		9	3
Spezia	Total		17	1	3	3	—		0	0	0	0	20	4
Reggina (loan)	2022–23	Serie B	15	3	0	0	—		—		1 (Note: Appearance in Serie B play-offs)	0	16	3
Slovan Bratislava (loan)	2023–24	Slovak First League	28	11	1	1	—		12 (Note: Two appearances in UEFA Champions League, two appearances and two goals in UEFA Europa League, eight appearances in UEFA Europa Conference League)	2	—		41	14
Slovan Bratislava	2024–25	Slovak First League	29	20	2	0	—		16 (Note: Appearances in UEFA Champions League)	5	—		47	25
Slovan Bratislava	2025–26	Slovak First League	3	1	0	0	—		6 (Note: Four appearances and three goals in UEFA Champions League, two appearances and one goal in UEFA Europa League)	4	—		9	5
Slovan Bratislava	Total		32	21	2	0	—		22	9	0	0	56	30
Middlesbrough	2025–26	Championship	32	8	0	0	—		—		3 (Note: Appearances in EFL Championship play-offs)	0	35	8
Middlesbrough	2026–27	Championship	6	1	0	0	2	0	—		—		8	1
Middlesbrough	Total		38	9	0	0	2	0	0	0	3	0	43	9
Career total			184	60	13	7	2	0	43	11	4	0	245	79

=== International ===
As of match played 16 November 2026

Appearances and goals by national team and year
National team	Year	Apps	Goals
Slovakia	2021	10	2
Slovakia	2022	6	0
Slovakia	2023	1	0
Slovakia	2024	11	5
Slovakia	2025	8	1
Slovakia	2026	9	3
Total		45	11

Scores and results list Slovakia's goal tally first, score column indicates score after each goal.

List of international goals scored by David Strelec
No.	Date	Venue	Opponent	Score	Result	Competition
1	27 March 2021	Anton Malatinsky Stadium, Trnava, Slovakia	Malta	1–2	2–2	2022 FIFA World Cup qualification
2	11 November 2021	Anton Malatinsky Stadium, Trnava, Slovakia	Slovenia	2–2	2–2	2022 FIFA World Cup qualification
3	5 June 2024	Wiener Neustadt Arena, Wiener Neustadt, Austria	San Marino	4–0	4–0	Friendly
4	8 September 2024	Košická futbalová aréna, Košice, Slovakia	Azerbaijan	2–0	2–0	2024–25 UEFA Nations League C
5	11 October 2024	Tehelné pole, Bratislava, Slovakia	Sweden	1–2	2–2	2024–25 UEFA Nations League C
6	11 October 2024	Tehelné pole, Bratislava, Slovakia	Sweden	2–2	2–2	2024–25 UEFA Nations League C
7	19 November 2024	Anton Malatinsky Stadium, Trnava, Slovakia	Estonia	1–0	1–0	2024–25 UEFA Nations League C
8	6 September 2025	Tehelné pole, Bratislava, Slovakia	Germany	2–0	2–0	2026 FIFA World Cup qualification
9	26 March 2026	Tehelné pole, Bratislava, Slovakia	Kosovo	3–4	3–4	2026 FIFA World Cup qualification
10	31 March 2026	Tehelné pole, Bratislava, Slovakia	Romania	2–0	2–0	Friendly
11	6 October 2026	Zimbru Stadium, Chișinău, Moldova	Moldova	1–0	4–0	2026–27 UEFA Nations League C

== Honours ==
Slovan Bratislava

- Slovak Cup: 2019–20, 2020–21

Individual

- Peter Dubovský Award: 2020
- Slovak Super Liga Team of the Season: 2020–21
- Slovak Super Liga U-21 Team of the Season: 2020–21
