= Lucas Lovat =

Brazilian footballer

Personal information
- Date of birth: 15 January 1997 (age 29)
- Place of birth: Farroupilha, Brazil
- Height: 1.84 m (6 ft 0 in)
- Position: Left back

Team information
- Current team: CRB
- Number: 36

Youth career
- Avaí

Senior career*
Years	Team	Apps	(Gls)
2015–2018	Avaí	14	(1)
2016–2017	→ Grêmio (loan)	0	(0)
2019	Spartak Trnava	24	(1)
2020–2023	Slovan Bratislava	58	(2)
2024–2026	Akhmat Grozny	18	(2)
2025	→ Goiás (loan)	24	(2)
2026–	CRB	34	(0)
- * Club domestic league appearances and goals as of 16 November 2026

Lucas Lovat (born 15 January 1997) is a Brazilian footballer who plays for CRB as a left back.

== Club career ==
=== Spartak Trnava ===
Lovat made his professional Fortuna Liga debut for Spartak Trnava against DAC Dunajská Streda on 23 February 2019.

=== Akhmat Grozny ===
On 18 January 2024, Lovat signed a contract until the end of the 2026–27 season with Russian Premier League club Akhmat Grozny.

On 9 January 2025, Lovat moved to Goiás on a year-long loan.

=== CRB ===
On 12 February 2026, Lovat joined CRB.

== Career statistics ==
As of match played 27 November 2024

Appearances and goals by club, season and competition
Club	Season	League			State league (Note: Includes Campeonato Catarinense)		National cup (Note: Includes Copa do Brasil, Slovak Cup, Russian Cup)		Continental		Other		Total	
Club	Season	Division	Apps	Goals	Apps	Goals	Apps	Goals	Apps	Goals	Apps	Goals	Apps	Goals
Avaí	2015	Série A	1	0	0	0	0	0	—		—		1	0
Avaí	2016	Série A	0	0	4	0	2	0	—		2 (Note: Appearances in Primeira Liga)	0	8	0
Avaí	2017	Série A	0	0	0	0	0	0	—		—		0	0
Avaí	2018	Série B	0	0	7	1	0	0	—		—		7	1
Avaí	Total		1	0	11	1	2	0	—		2	0	16	1
Spartak Trnava	2018–19	Slovak First League	10	0	—		3	0	—		—		13	0
Spartak Trnava	2019–20	Slovak First League	14	1	—		3	1	4 (Note: Appearances in UEFA Europa League)	0	1 (Note: Appearance in Czechoslovak Supercup)	0	22	2
Spartak Trnava	Total		24	1	—		6	1	4	0	1	0	35	2
Slovan Bratislava	2019–20	Slovak First League	5	0	—		0	0	0	0	—		5	0
Slovan Bratislava	2020–21	Slovak First League	13	0	—		3	1	0	0	—		16	1
Slovan Bratislava	2021–22	Slovak First League	6	0	—		1	0	—		—		7	0
Slovan Bratislava	2022–23	Slovak First League	24	1	—		5	0	8 (Note: Appearances in UEFA Europa Conference League)	0	—		37	1
Slovan Bratislava	2023–24	Slovak First League	10	1	—		2	0	11 (Note: Six appearances in UEFA Champions League, two appearances in UEFA Europa League, three appearances in UEFA Europa Conference League)	0	—		23	1
Slovan Bratislava	Total		58	2	—		11	1	19	0	—		88	3
Akhmat Grozny	2023–24	Russian Premier League	11	1	—		2	0	—		—		13	1
Akhmat Grozny	2024–25	Russian Premier League	7	1	—		6	1	—		—		13	2
Akhmat Grozny	Total		18	2	—		8	1	—		—		26	3
Career total			100	5	11	1	27	3	23	0	3	0	164	9

== Honours ==
Spartak Trnava

- Slovak Cup: 2018–19

Slovan Bratislava

- Slovak First Football League: 2019–20, 2020–21, 2021–22, 2022–23
- Slovak Cup: 2019–20, 2020–21

Individual

- Slovak First Football League Top Assist Provider: 2022–23
- Slovak First Football League Team of the Season: 2022–23
