= Matúš Vojtko =

Slovak footballer

Personal information
- Full name: Matúš Vojtko
- Date of birth: 5 October 2000 (age 26)
- Place of birth: Michalovce, Slovakia
- Height: 1.81 m (5 ft 11 in)
- Position: Left-back

Team information
- Current team: Wieczysta Kraków
- Number: 27

Youth career
- 2010–2018: Zemplín Michalovce

Senior career*
| Years | Team | Apps | (Gls) |
| 2018–2021 | Zemplín Michalovce | 63 | (2) |
| 2021–2025 | Slovan Bratislava | 48 | (1) |
| 2021–2024 | Slovan Bratislava B | 11 | (0) |
| 2022–2023 | → Gorica (loan) | 24 | (1) |
| 2025–2026 | Lechia Gdańsk | 31 | (1) |
| 2026– | Wieczysta Kraków | 0 | (0) |

International career
| 2017 | Slovakia U17 | 1 | (0) |
| 2018 | Slovakia U19 | 6 | (0) |
| 2019–2022 | Slovakia U21 | 15 | (1) |
- * Club domestic league appearances and goals as of 08:26, 26 May 2026 (UTC)

Matúš Vojtko (born 5 October 2000) is a Slovak professional footballer who plays as a left-back for Ekstraklasa club Wieczysta Kraków.

== Club career ==
Vojtko made his Fortuna Liga debut for Zemplín Michalovce in a 1–2 loss to Slovan Bratislava on 5 August 2018. He played for the entirety of the match.

== Career statistics ==
As of match played 23 May 2026

Appearances and goals by club, season and competition
| Club | Season | League | | | National cup (Note: Includes Slovak Cup, Croatian Cup) | | Europe | | Other | | Total | |
| Club | Season | Division | Apps | Goals | Apps | Goals | Apps | Goals | Apps | Goals | Apps | Goals |
|---|---|---|---|---|---|---|---|---|---|---|---|---|
| Zemplín Michalovce | 2018–19 | Slovak First Football League | 21 | 1 | 4 | 0 | — | | — | | 25 | 1 |
| Zemplín Michalovce | 2019–20 | Slovak First Football League | 21 | 1 | 0 | 0 | — | | — | | 21 | 1 |
| Zemplín Michalovce | 2020–21 | Slovak First Football League | 17 | 0 | 0 | 0 | — | | 6 (Note: Appearances in relegation play-offs) | 0 | 23 | 0 |
| Zemplín Michalovce | 2021–22 | Slovak First Football League | 4 | 0 | 0 | 0 | — | | — | | 4 | 0 |
| Zemplín Michalovce | Total | | 63 | 2 | 4 | 0 | — | | 6 | 0 | 73 | 2 |
| Slovan Bratislava | 2021–22 | Slovak First Football League | 9 | 0 | 4 | 1 | 0 | 0 | — | | 13 | 1 |
| Slovan Bratislava | 2023–24 | Slovak First Football League | 20 | 1 | 4 | 0 | 1 (Note: Appearance(s) in UEFA Europa League) | 0 | — | | 25 | 1 |
| Slovan Bratislava | 2024–25 | Slovak First Football League | 19 | 0 | 4 | 2 | 4 (Note: Appearance(s) in UEFA Champions League) | 0 | — | | 27 | 2 |
| Slovan Bratislava | Total | | 48 | 1 | 12 | 3 | 5 | 0 | 0 | 0 | 65 | 4 |
| Slovan Bratislava B (loan) | 2021–22 | 2. Liga | 7 | 0 | — | | — | | — | | 7 | 0 |
| Slovan Bratislava B (loan) | 2023–24 | 2. Liga | 3 | 0 | — | | — | | — | | 3 | 0 |
| Slovan Bratislava B (loan) | 2024–25 | 2. Liga | 1 | 0 | — | | — | | — | | 1 | 0 |
| Slovan Bratislava B (loan) | Total | | 11 | 0 | — | | — | | — | | 11 | 0 |
| Gorica (loan) | 2022–23 | Croatian Football League | 24 | 1 | 2 | 0 | — | | — | | 26 | 1 |
| Lechia Gdańsk | 2025–26 | Ekstraklasa | 31 | 1 | 1 | 0 | — | | — | | 32 | 1 |
| Wieczysta Kraków | 2026–27 | Ekstraklasa | 0 | 0 | 0 | 0 | — | | — | | 0 | 0 |
| Career total | | | 174 | 5 | 19 | 3 | 5 | 0 | 6 | 0 | 204 | 8 |

== Honours ==
Slovan Bratislava

- Slovak First Football League: 2021–22, 2023–24, 2024–25
