= Príbelce =

Príbelce Fehérkút
- Municipality
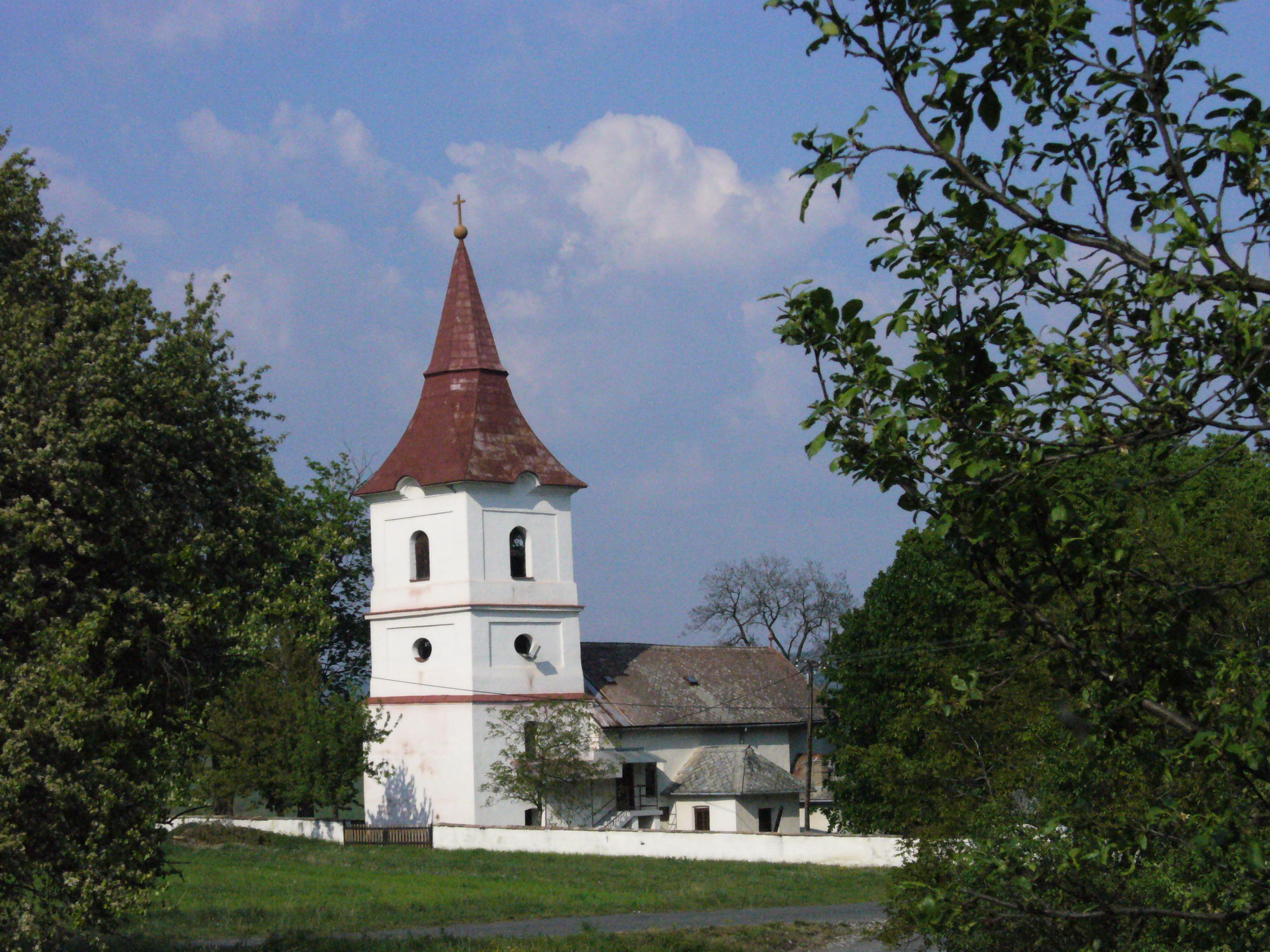
- Lutheran church in Príbelce

- Flag

- Location of Príbelce in the Banská Bystrica Region Location of Príbelce in Slovakia
- Coordinates: 48.20°N 19.25°E
- Country: Slovakia
- Region: Banská Bystrica Region
- District: Veľký Krtíš District
- First mentioned: 1244

Area
  - Total: 27.19 km^{2} (10.50 sq mi)
- Elevation: 269 m (883 ft)

Population (2025)
  - Total: 574
- Time zone: UTC+1 (CET)
  - Summer (DST): UTC+2 (CEST)
- Postal code: 991 25
- Area code: +421 47
- Vehicle registration plate (until 2022): VK
- Website: www.pribelce.sk

Príbelce (Hungarian: Fehérkút) is a village and municipality in the Veľký Krtíš District of the Banská Bystrica Region of southern Slovakia.

== Geography ==
The municipality lies at an altitude of 269 metres (883 ft) and covers an area of 27.19 km^{2} (10.50 sq mi) (2025).

== Population ==
Population statistic (10 years)
Year	1995	2005	2015	2025
Count	629	583	573	574
Difference		−7.31%	−1.71%	+0.17%

Population statistic
Year	2024	2025
Count	569	574
Difference		+0.87%

It has a population of 574 people (31 December 2025).

=== Ethnicity ===
Census 2021 (1+ %)
Ethnicity	Number	Fraction
Slovak	543	97.31%
Not found out	12	2.15%
Czech	8	1.43%
Hungarian	7	1.25%
Total	558	

In year 2021 was 558 people by ethnicity 543 as Slovak, 12 as Not found out, 8 as Czech, 7 as Hungarian, 2 as Polish, 2 as Other, 1 as Italian, 1 as Serbian, 1 as Romanian, 1 as German and 1 as English.

Note on population: The difference values of population numbers in the table "Population statistic" and in the sections "Ethnicity" & "Religion" is caused by the use of various statistical methods.

=== Religion ===
Census 2021 (1+ %)
Religion	Number	Fraction
Evangelical Church	416	74.55%
Roman Catholic Church	95	17.03%
None	34	6.09%
Total	558	

In year 2021 was 558 people by religion 416 from Evangelical Church, 95 from Roman Catholic Church, 34 from None, 4 from Greek Catholic Church, 3 from Paganism and natural spirituality, 3 from Not found out, 2 from Ad hoc movements and 1 from Other.
