= Dávid Holman =

Hungarian international footballer (born 1993)

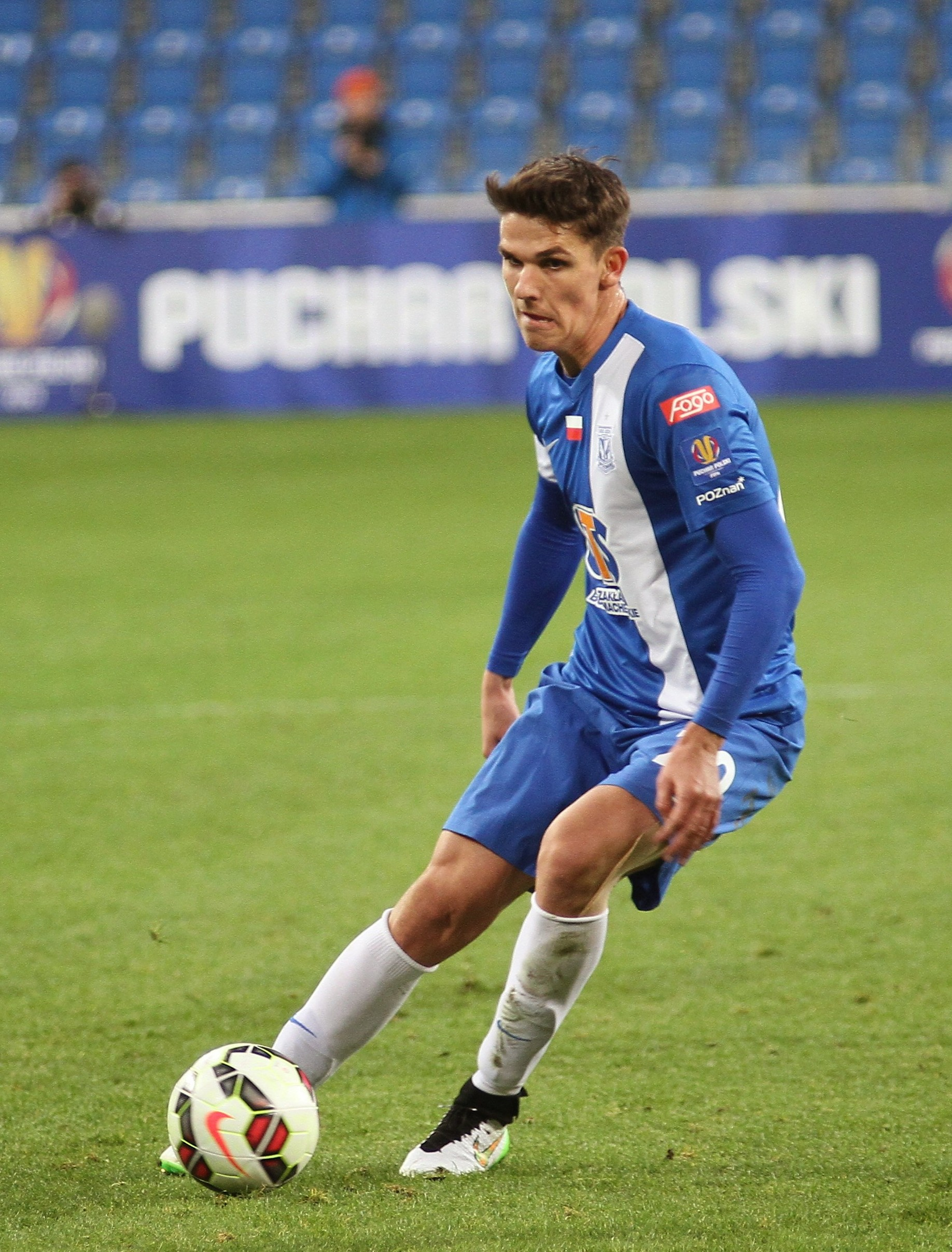
- Holman playing for Lech Poznań in 2015

Personal information
- Full name: Dávid Holman
- Date of birth: 17 March 1993 (age 33)
- Place of birth: Budapest, Hungary
- Height: 1.88 m (6 ft 2 in)
- Position: Attacking midfielder

Team information
- Current team: Szeged-Csanád
- Number: 10

Youth career
- 2003–2007: Vác
- 2007–2009: MTK Budapest

Senior career*
| Years | Team | Apps | (Gls) |
| 2009–2011 | Vác | 0 | (0) |
| 2009–2010 | → Érsekvadkert (loan) | 6 | (1) |
| 2010–2011 | → Ferencváros B (loan) | 1 | (0) |
| 2011–2015 | Ferencváros Budapest | 27 | (3) |
| 2015 | → Lech Poznań (loan) | 4 | (0) |
| 2015 | → Lech Poznań II (loan) | 11 | (4) |
| 2016–2017 | Debrecen | 44 | (9) |
| 2017–2023 | Slovan Bratislava | 104 | (27) |
| 2023–2025 | Budapest Honvéd | 41 | (5) |
| 2025– | Szeged-Csanád | 21 | (1) |

International career
| 2012 | Hungary U19 | 1 | (0) |
| 2013 | Hungary U21 | 4 | (3) |
| 2019 | Hungary | 5 | (1) |
- * Club domestic league appearances and goals as of 31 May 2026

Dávid Holman (born 17 March 1993) is a Hungarian professional footballer who plays as an attacking midfielder for Szeged-Csanád.

== Club career ==
=== Ferencváros ===
On 5 May 2012, Holman played his first match in the team of Ferencváros Budapest against Siófok in the 2011–12 season of the Hungarian League.

On 12 November 2012, he signed his first professional contract with Ferencváros Budapest.

On 10 August 2013, Holman scored his first goal in the Hungarian League when playing against the title-holders, ETO Győr in the 58th minute in the 2013–14 season.

On 9 December 2014, Holman extended his contract with Ferencváros.

=== Lech Poznań ===
On 16 January 2015, Ferencváros loaned Holman to Ekstraklasa club Lech Poznań for one year.

=== Slovan Bratislava ===
On 15 August 2017, Holman was signed by Slovak club SK Slovan Bratislava. It was also revealed that Slovan Bratislava paid 700,000 euros for the Hungarian midfielder.

== International career ==
He made his Hungary national football team debut on 8 June 2019 in a Euro 2020 qualifier against Azerbaijan, as a 58th-minute substitute for Dominik Szoboszlai and scored the last goal in a 3–1 victory.

== Career statistics ==
=== Club ===
As of 12 August 2022

Appearances and goals by club, season and competition
| Club | Season | League | | | National cup (Note: Includes Magyar Kupa, Polish Cup, Slovak Cup) | | League cup (Note: Includes Ligakupa) | | Europe | | Other | | Total | |
| Club | Season | Division | Apps | Goals | Apps | Goals | Apps | Goals | Apps | Goals | Apps | Goals | Apps | Goals |
|---|---|---|---|---|---|---|---|---|---|---|---|---|---|---|
| Ferencváros | 2011–12 | NB I | 1 | 0 | 0 | 0 | 1 | 0 | — | | — | | 2 | 0 |
| Ferencváros | 2012–13 | NB I | 4 | 0 | 0 | 0 | 1 | 0 | — | | — | | 5 | 0 |
| Ferencváros | 2013–14 | NB I | 22 | 3 | 1 | 0 | 5 | 2 | — | | — | | 28 | 5 |
| Ferencváros | 2014–15 | NB I | 0 | 0 | 0 | 0 | 1 | 0 | 1 (Note: Appearance(s) in UEFA Europa League) | 0 | — | | 2 | 0 |
| Ferencváros | Total | | 27 | 3 | 1 | 0 | 8 | 2 | 1 | 0 | — | | 37 | 5 |
| Lech Poznań | 2014–15 | Ekstraklasa | 1 | 0 | 1 | 0 | — | | 0 | 0 | — | | 2 | 0 |
| Lech Poznań | 2015–16 | Ekstraklasa | 3 | 0 | 3 | 2 | — | | 3 | 0 | 0 | 0 | 9 | 2 |
| Lech Poznań | Total | | 4 | 0 | 4 | 2 | — | | 3 | 0 | 0 | 0 | 11 | 2 |
| Debrecen | 2015–16 | NB I | 13 | 2 | 3 | 0 | — | | — | | — | | 16 | 2 |
| Debrecen | 2016–17 | NB I | 26 | 7 | 0 | 0 | — | | 4 | 1 | — | | 30 | 8 |
| Debrecen | 2017–18 | NB I | 5 | 0 | 0 | 0 | — | | — | | — | | 5 | 0 |
| Debrecen | Total | | 44 | 9 | 3 | 0 | — | | 4 | 1 | — | | 51 | 10 |
| Slovan Bratislava | 2017–18 | Slovak Super Liga | 27 | 5 | 5 | 1 | — | | — | | — | | 32 | 6 |
| Slovan Bratislava | 2018–19 | Slovak Super Liga | 24 | 6 | 0 | 0 | — | | 4 | 0 | — | | 28 | 6 |
| Slovan Bratislava | 2019–20 | Slovak Super Liga | 18 | 5 | 3 | 0 | — | | 12 (Note: Two appearances in UEFA Champions League, ten appearances and two goals in UEFA Europa League) | 2 | — | | 33 | 7 |
| Slovan Bratislava | 2020–21 | Slovak Super Liga | 24 | 10 | 5 | 1 | — | | 1 | 0 | — | | 30 | 11 |
| Slovan Bratislava | 2021–22 | Slovak Super Liga | 7 | 0 | 2 | 0 | — | | — | | — | | 9 | 0 |
| Slovan Bratislava | 2022–23 | Slovak Super Liga | 3 | 1 | 0 | 0 | — | | 4 (Note: Appearances in UEFA Champions League) | 0 | — | | 7 | 1 |
| Slovan Bratislava | Total | | 103 | 27 | 15 | 2 | — | | 21 | 2 | — | | 139 | 31 |
| Career total | | | 178 | 39 | 23 | 4 | 8 | 2 | 29 | 3 | 0 | 0 | 238 | 48 |

=== International ===
Appearances and goals by national team and year
| National team | Year | Apps | Goals |
|---|---|---|---|
Hungary
| Hungary | 2019 | 5 | 1 |
| Total | | 5 | 1 |

Scores and results list Hungary's goal tally first, score column indicates score after each Holman goal.

List of international goals scored by Dávid Holman
| No. | Date | Venue | Opponent | Score | Result | Competition |
|---|---|---|---|---|---|---|
| 1 | 8 June 2019 | Bakcell Arena, Baku, Azerbaijan | Azerbaijan | 3–1 | 3–1 | UEFA Euro 2020 qualification |

== Honours ==
Lech Poznań

- Ekstraklasa: 2014–15

Slovan Bratislava

- Fortuna Liga: 2018–19, 2019–20, 2020–21, 2021–22, 2022–23
- Slovak Cup: 2017–18, 2019–20, 2020–21

Individual

- Slovak Super Liga Team of the Season: 2019–20
