= Rafael Ratão =

Brazilian footballer

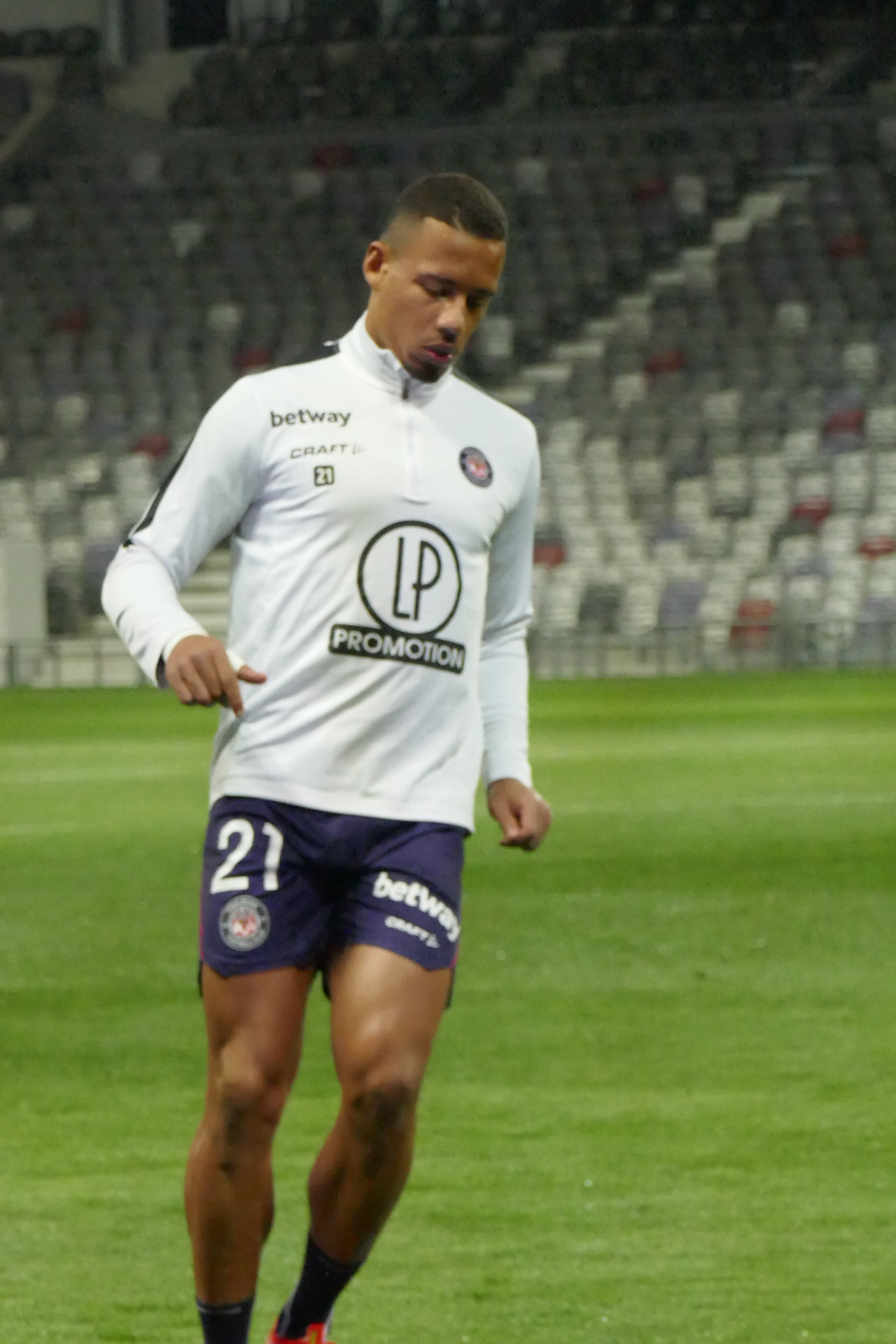
- Ratão warming up for Toulouse in 2022

Personal information
- Full name: Rafael Rogério da Silva
- Date of birth: 30 November 1995 (age 30)
- Place of birth: Sumaré, Brazil
- Height: 1.83 m (6 ft 0 in)
- Position: Winger

Team information
- Current team: Shanghai Shenhua
- Number: 9

Youth career
- 200?–2012: São Paulo
- 2013: Ponte Preta

Senior career*
Years	Team	Apps	(Gls)
2013–2016	Ponte Preta	13	(2)
2013	→ Penapolense (loan)	7	(0)
2014	→ Boa (loan)	3	(0)
2014	→ Santos B (loan)	0	(0)
2015	→ Penapolense (loan)	1	(0)
2015	→ Guaratinguetá (loan)	4	(0)
2015	→ Albirex Niigata (loan)	0	(0)
2016	→ Náutico (loan)	5	(0)
2016	Chungju Hummel	17	(5)
2017	Atlético Tubarão	16	(7)
2017	→ Luverdense (loan)	32	(5)
2018	Novorizontino	8	(0)
2018	Oeste	2	(0)
2018–2019	Zorya Luhansk	11	(2)
2019	→ Slovan Bratislava (loan)	25	(10)
2020–2021	Slovan Bratislava	32	(15)
2021–2023	Toulouse	55	(16)
2023–2025	Bahia	45	(8)
2025	→ Cerezo Osaka (loan)	36	(18)
2026-	Shanghai Shenhua	29	(20)
- * Club domestic league appearances and goals as of 19 November 2026

Rafael Rogério da Silva (born 30 November 1995), commonly known as Rafael Ratão, is a Brazilian professional footballer who plays as a winger for Shanghai Shenhua.

== Career ==
Born in Cascavel, Paraná, Ratão has played in Brazil for Ponte Preta, Penapolense (twice), Santos, Boa and Guaratinguetá.

In August 2015, Ratão joined Japanese club Albirex Niigata on loan until January 2016.

On 1 January 2026, Ratão joined Chinese Super League club Shanghai Shenhua.

== Career statistics ==
As of match played 30 May 2026

Appearances and goals by club, season and competition
Club	Season	League			State league		National cup		Continental		Other		Total	
Club	Season	Division	Apps	Goals	Apps	Goals	Apps	Goals	Apps	Goals	Apps	Goals	Apps	Goals
Ponte Preta	2013	Série A	13	2	—		1	0	3 (Note: Appearances in Copa Sudamericana)	0	—		17	2
Ponte Preta	2014	Série B	—		0	0	—		—		—		0	0
Ponte Preta	Total		13	2	0	0	1	0	3	0	—		17	2
Penapolense (loan)	2014	Paulista	—		7	0	—		—		—		7	0
Boa (loan)	2014	Série B	3	0	—		—		—		—		3	0
Penapolense (loan)	2015	Paulista	—		1	0	—		—		—		1	0
Guaratinguetá (loan)	2015	Série C	4	0	—		—		—		—		4	0
Albirex Niigata (loan)	2015	J1 League	0	0	—		1	0	—		0	0	1	0
Náutico (loan)	2016	Série B	2	0	3	0	—		—		—		5	0
Chungju Hummel	2016	K League Challenge	17	5	—		—		—		—		17	5
Atlético Tubarão	2017	Catarinense	—		16	7	—		—		—		16	7
Luverdense (loan)	2017	Série B	32	5	—		—		—		0	0	32	5
Novorizontino	2018	Série D	—		8	0	—		—		—		8	0
Oeste	2018	Série B	2	0	—		—		—		—		2	0
Zorya Luhansk	2018–19	Ukrainian Premier League	11	2	—		0	0	4 (Note: Appearances in UEFA Europa League)	2	—		15	4
Slovan Bratislava (loan)	2018–19	Slovak Super Liga	5	1	—		—		—		—		5	1
Slovan Bratislava (loan)	2019–20	Slovak Super Liga	20	9	—		5	2	12 (Note: Two appearances in UEFA Champions League, ten appearances and one goal in UEFA Europa League)	1	—		37	12
Slovan Bratislava (loan)	Total		25	10	—		5	2	12	1	—		42	13
Slovan Bratislava	2020–21	Slovak Super Liga	29	14	—		7	0	1	0	—		37	14
Slovan Bratislava	2021–22	Slovak Super Liga	3	1	—		—		6 (Note: Four appearances and two goals in UEFA Champions League, two appearances in UEFA Europa League)	2	—		9	3
Slovan Bratislava	Total		32	15	—		7	0	7	2	—		46	17
Toulouse	2021–22	Ligue 2	25	11	—		5	2	—		—		30	13
Toulouse	2022–23	Ligue 1	30	5	—		4	1	—		—		34	6
Toulouse	Total		55	16	—		9	3	—		—		64	19
Bahia	2023	Série A	18	4	—		—		—		—		18	4
Bahia	2024	Série A	19	1	8	3	4	1	—		5	1	36	6
Bahia	Total		37	5	8	3	4	1	—		5	1	54	10
Cerezo Osaka (loan)	2025	J1 League	36	18	—		3	2	—		5	3	44	23
Shanghai Shenhua	2026	Chinese Super League	15	10	—		0	0	2 (Note: Appearances in AFC Champions League Elite)	0	—		17	10
Career total			284	88	43	10	30	8	28	5	10	4	392	115

== Honours ==
Slovan Bratislava

- Fortuna Liga: 2018–19, 2019–20, 2020–21
- Slovnaft Cup: 2019–20, 2020–21

Toulouse

- Ligue 2: 2021–22
- Coupe de France: 2022–23

Individual

- Slovak Super Liga Team of the Season: 2020-21
