= Ondřej Petrák =

Czech footballer (born 1992)

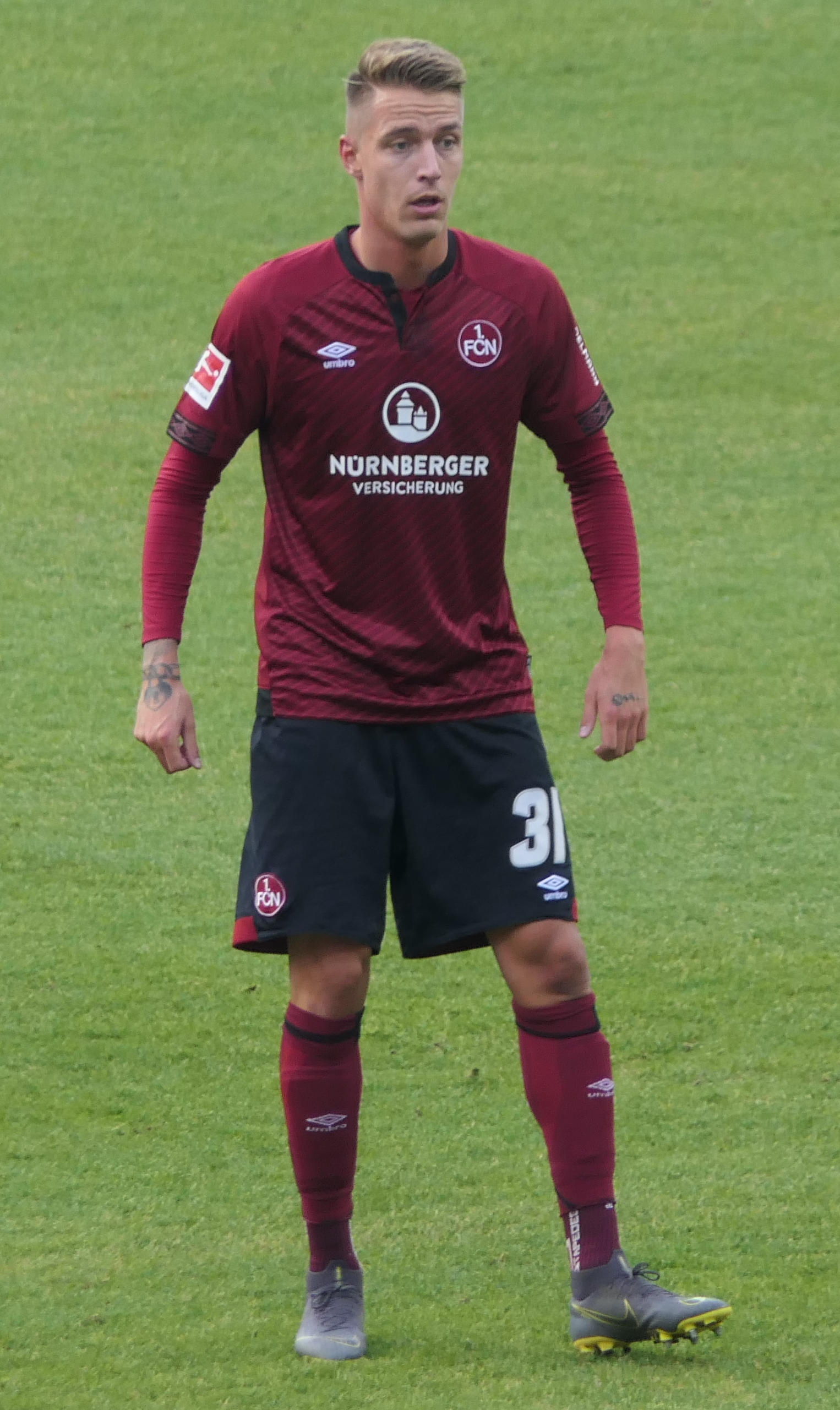
- Petrák with 1. FC Nürnberg in 2019

Personal information
- Full name: Ondřej Petrák
- Date of birth: 11 March 1992 (age 34)
- Place of birth: Prague, Czechoslovakia
- Height: 1.86 m (6 ft 1 in)
- Position: Midfielder

Team information
- Current team: Zápy

Youth career
- 1999–2000: Olympie Dolní Břežany
- 2000–2001: ABC Braník
- 2001–2002: Bohemians 1905
- 2002–2010: Slavia Prague

Senior career*
Years	Team	Apps	(Gls)
2010–2013	Slavia Prague	62	(2)
2014–2020	1. FC Nürnberg	129	(3)
2020	→ Dynamo Dresden (loan)	13	(0)
2020–2021	Slovan Bratislava	3	(0)
2020–2021	→ Slovan Bratislava B	15	(2)
2022–2025	Bohemians 1905	35	(3)
2025–	Zápy	0	(0)

International career
2008	Czech Republic U16	6	(0)
2008	Czech Republic U17	6	(0)
2010	Czech Republic U18	4	(0)
2012	Czech Republic U20	1	(0)
2012–2015	Czech Republic U21	12	(1)
- * Club domestic league appearances and goals as of 17 June 2025

Ondřej Petrák (born 11 March 1992) is a Czech professional footballer who is currently signed to Zápy in the Bohemian Football League. He represented the Czech Republic at under-21 level and spent several seasons playing in Germany.

== Career ==
=== Slovan Bratislava ===
On 24 July 2020, Slovan Bratislava have announced signing of a three-year deal with Petrák. He was set to replace departing Marin Ljubičić and fill-in for Filip Lichý, who suffered a serious injury in previous months. He was recommended by former Slovak international Marek Mintál, managing in Nürnberg's structures.

=== Zápy ===
On 5 August 2025, Petrák signed a contract with Bohemian Football League club Zápy.
