= Vladimír Tkáč =

Slovak footballer

Personal information
- Full name: Vladimír Tkáč
- Date of birth: 9 January 1998 (age 28)
- Place of birth: Partizánske, Slovakia
- Height: 1.84 m (6 ft 0 in)
- Position: Forward

Youth career
- 2005–2016: Tempo Partizánske
- 2013–2017: → Nitra

Senior career*
Years	Team	Apps	(Gls)
2017	Nitra B		
2018	ASV Degernbach		
2018	Tempo Partizánske		
2019–	Vion Zlaté Moravce	16	(1)
- * Club domestic league appearances and goals as of 8 January 2021

Vladimír Tkáč (born 9 January 1998) is a professional Slovak footballer who last played for ViOn Zlaté Moravce as a forward.

== Club career ==
=== FC ViOn Zlaté Moravce ===
Tkáč made his Fortuna Liga debut for ViOn Zlaté Moravce against AS Trenčín on 23 February 2019.
