= Matúš Ružinský =

Slovak football goalkeeper

Personal information
- Date of birth: 15 January 1992 (age 34)
- Place of birth: Banská Bystrica, Czechoslovakia
- Height: 1.96 m (6 ft 5 in)
- Position: Goalkeeper

Team information
- Current team: Gabčíkovo

Youth career
- –2008: Dukla Banská Bystrica
- 2009–2011: Košice

Senior career*
Years	Team	Apps	(Gls)
2011–2017	VSS Košice	42	(0)
2017–2018	Sereď	19	(0)
2018–2023	Slovan Bratislava	3	(0)
2019	→ Fluminense Šamorín (loan)	11	(0)
2019–2023	→ Slovan Bratislava B	31	(1)
2023–2024	Zemplín Michalovce	4	(0)
2024–	Gabčíkovo		
- * Club domestic league appearances and goals as of 1 December 2023

Matúš Ružinský (born 15 January 1992) is a Slovak football goalkeeper who plays for Gabčíkovo.

== Club career ==
He made his professional debut for Košice against AS Trenčín on 13 April 2013.

== Honours ==
ŠKF Sereď

- 2. Liga: 2017–18

Slovan Bratislava

- Fortuna Liga: 2021–22
