= David Hrnčár =

Slovak footballer

Personal information
- Date of birth: 10 December 1997 (age 28)
- Place of birth: Žilina, Slovakia
- Height: 1.86 m (6 ft 1 in)
- Position: Right midfielder

Team information
- Current team: Dender EH
- Number: 20

Youth career
- 2005–2016: Slovan Bratislava
- 2014–2015: → Inter Bratislava (loan)
- 2015: → FKM Karlova Ves Bratislava (loan)

Senior career*
| Years | Team | Apps | (Gls) |
| 2016–2018 | Slovan Bratislava B | 68 | (58) |
| 2018 | Slovan Bratislava | 1 | (0) |
| 2017 | → Žilina B (loan) | 5 | (2) |
| 2019 | Pohronie | 29 | (3) |
| 2020 | ViOn Zlaté Moravce | 25 | (5) |
| 2021–2023 | Slovan Bratislava | 40 | (5) |
| 2021 | → ViOn Zlaté Moravce (loan) | 15 | (2) |
| 2022–2023 | → Beveren (loan) | 14 | (3) |
| 2023–2024 | Beveren | 24 | (2) |
| 2024– | Dender EH | 51 | (6) |

International career
| 2025– | Slovakia | 1 | (0) |
- * Club domestic league appearances and goals as of 11 May 2026

David Hrnčár (born 10 December 1997) is a Slovak professional footballer who currently plays for Dender EH as a right midfielder.

== Club career ==
Hrnčár made his Fortuna Liga debut for Slovan Bratislava against Zemplín Michalovce on 5 August 2018.

On 19 January 2022, it was announced that Hrnčár would move to Beveren of the Belgian second division on loan until June 2023 with option to buy. He was going to aid Beveren for title and promotion and set to wear jersey number 22. The club later activated the option for a permanent transfer.

After almost two years of playing for Beveren, Hrnčár transferred to a newly promoted top flight club Dender EH, signing a two-year contract with an option for a third year.

== International career ==
In March 2021, Hrnčár was included in the national team reserve squad by head coach Štefan Tarkovič for three World Cup qualifiers. Hrnčár entered the shortlisted 27-man squad in September 2022 replacing injured Ivan Schranz for four 2022–23 UEFA Nations League C fixtures. However, he failed to repeat the nomination for November friendlies or prospective national team players' training camp in December, only listed as an alternate.

On 7 June 2025, Hrnčár made his debut for the Slovakia national football team in a friendly match against Greece.

== Personal life ==
His father, Norbert, is a former footballer who played twice for Slovakia and most recently managed Zemplín Michalovce.

== Honours ==
- Slovak Super Liga Top Assist Provider: 2020-21
- Slovak Super Liga Team of the Season: 2020-21
- Slovak Super Liga Young Player of the Season: 2020-21
