= 2018–19 ŠK Slovan Bratislava season =

Slovan Bratislava
2018–19 season
- Chairman: Ivan Kmotrík
- Head coach: Martin Ševela
- Stadium: Pasienky; Tehelné pole
- Slovak 1st League: 1st
- Slovak Cup: Second round
- UEFA Europa League: Third qualifying round
- Top goalscorer: League: Andraž Šporar (29); All: Andraž Šporar (34)
- Highest home attendance: 22,500 (3 Mar 2019 v Spartak Trnava, FL Round 21)
- Lowest home attendance: 1,031 (22 Sep 2018 v Sereď, FL Round 9)
- Biggest win: 6–0 (3 Nov 2018 v Zemplín Michalovce, FL Round 14)
- Biggest defeat: 0–4 (16 Aug 2018 v Rapid Wien, EL QR3)
Home colours	Away colours	Third colours

The 2018–19 season was ŠK Slovan Bratislava's 13th consecutive season in the top flight of Slovak football.

The season proved to be one of the most significant in the club's modern history. Slovan won the Slovak First Football League for the first time since the 2013–14 season, securing the title on 14 April 2019 with six rounds still remaining. The club dominated the league campaign from start to finish, remaining top of the table throughout the entire season and finishing 17 points clear of second-placed DAC Dunajská Streda.

The campaign was also marked by the club's return to Tehelné pole after more than nine years. After spending the autumn part of the season at Pasienky, Slovan played the official opening match at the new stadium on 3 March 2019, defeating their biggest rivals Spartak Trnava 2–0 in front of a sold-out crowd. Both goals were scored by Andraž Šporar.

Šporar was one of the key figures of the season. He finished as the league's top scorer with 29 goals, equalling Róbert Semeník's record for the most goals scored in a single Slovak top-flight season.

On 3 May 2019, Slovan celebrated the 100th anniversary of its foundation. The club dedicated its home match against Žilina on 11 May to the centenary celebrations, while also commemorating the 50th anniversary of its victory over Barcelona in the 1969 European Cup Winners' Cup final. Slovan defeated Žilina 6–2.

The official title celebrations took place after the final league match of the season, a 3–1 home win against Sereď on 24 May 2019.

As the defending Slovak Cup holders, Slovan entered the domestic cup competition with the aim of retaining the trophy, but were eliminated after their opening match due to an administrative breach, despite winning the match on the pitch.

Slovan also competed in the UEFA Europa League, where they eliminated Milsami Orhei and Balzan before being knocked out by Rapid Wien in the third qualifying round.

== Players ==
As of 24 May 2019

Squad No.	Name	Nationality	Position(s)	Date of birth (age)
Goalkeepers
1	Dominik Greif	(Slovakia)	GK	6 April 1997 (aged 22)
30	Michal Šulla	(Slovakia)	GK	15 July 1991 (aged 27)
31	Martin Trnovský	(Slovakia)	GK	7 June 2000 (aged 18)
—	Matúš Ružinský (out on loan at (Slovakia) Šamorín)	(Slovakia)	GK	15 January 1992 (aged 27)
Defenders
2	Mitch Apau	(Netherlands)	RB	27 April 1990 (aged 29)
17	Jurij Medveděv	(Czech Republic)	RB	18 June 1996 (aged 22)
20	Stefan Stangl	(Austria)	LB	20 October 1991 (aged 27)
23	Artem Sukhotskyi	(Ukraine)	LB	6 December 1992 (aged 26)
25	Martin Majling	(Slovakia)	CB	30 June 2000 (aged 18)
26	Richárd Guzmics	(Hungary)	CB	16 April 1987 (aged 32)
29	Vasil Bozhikov (captain)	(Bulgaria)	CB / LB	2 June 1988 (aged 30)
66	Kenan Bajrić	(Slovenia)	CB / DM	20 December 1994 (aged 24)
—	Vernon De Marco (out on loan at (Poland) Lech Poznań)	(Argentina)	CB / LB	18 November 1992 (aged 26)
—	Samuel Kozlovský (out on loan at (Slovakia) Petržalka)	(Slovakia)	LB	19 November 1999 (aged 19)
—	Adam Laczkó (out on loan at (Slovakia) Trenčín)	(Slovakia)	CB	2 April 1997 (aged 22)
Midfielders
6	Joeri de Kamps	(Netherlands)	DM	10 February 1992 (aged 27)
7	Moha	(Morocco)	LW	15 September 1993 (aged 25)
8	Marin Ljubičić	(Croatia)	DM	15 June 1988 (aged 30)
10	Ibrahim Rabiu	(Nigeria)	CM / CAM	15 March 1991 (aged 28)
11	Dejan Dražić	(Serbia)	RW / LW / CAM	26 September 1995 (aged 23)
13	Nono	(Spain)	CM / DM	30 March 1993 (aged 26)
14	Adam Jackuliak	(Slovakia)	RW	30 January 2000 (aged 19)
15	Denis Potoma	(Slovakia)	CAM	15 February 2000 (aged 19)
27	Dávid Holman	(Hungary)	CAM	17 March 1993 (aged 26)
45	Aleksandar Čavrić	(Serbia)	RW	18 May 1994 (aged 25)
—	David Hrnčár (out on loan at (Slovakia) Pohronie)	(Slovakia)	RW	10 December 1997 (aged 21)
Forwards
9	Andraž Šporar	(Slovenia)	ST	27 February 1994 (aged 25)
12	Boris Cmiljanić	(Montenegro)	ST / RW / LW	17 March 1996 (aged 23)
21	Rafael Ratão (on loan from (Ukraine) Zorya Luhansk)	(Brazil)	ST / CAM / RW / LW	30 November 1995 (aged 23)
24	David Strelec	(Slovakia)	ST / CAM	4 April 2001 (aged 18)
33	Róbert Vittek	(Slovakia)	ST	1 April 1982 (aged 37)

== Transfers and loans ==
=== Transfers in ===
Entry date	Position	Nationality	Name	From	Fee	Ref.
8 June 2018	GK	(Slovakia)	Matúš Ružinský	(Slovakia) Sereď	Free transfer	
16 June 2018	MF	(Serbia)	Dejan Dražić	(Spain) Celta Vigo B	Free transfer	
21 June 2018	DF	(Netherlands)	Mitch Apau	(Slovenia) Olimpija Ljubljana	Free transfer	
30 June 2018	DF	(Slovakia)	Juraj Kotula	(Slovakia) Zlaté Moravce	Loan return	
31 January 2019	DF	(Slovakia)	Juraj Kotula	(Slovakia) Senica	Loan return	
30 June 2018	DF	(Czech Republic)	Jurij Medveděv	(Slovakia) Senica	Loan return	
30 June 2018	MF	(Slovakia)	Samuel Šefčík	(Slovakia) Senica	Loan return	
25 August 2018	MF	(Croatia)	Marin Ljubičić	(Slovakia) DAC Dunajská Streda	Free transfer	
26 January 2019	DF	(Hungary)	Richárd Guzmics	(China) Yanbian Funde	Free transfer	
23 February 2019	DF	(Austria)	Stefan Stangl	Free agent		
24 May 2019	FW	(Slovakia)	Róbert Vittek	Free agent		

=== Loans in ===
Start date	Position	Nationality	Name	From	End date	Ref.
6 February 2019	FW	(Brazil)	Rafael Ratão	(Ukraine) Zorya Luhansk	30 June 2019	

=== Transfers out ===
Exit date	Position	Nationality	Name	To	Fee	Ref.
15 June 2018	DF	(Serbia)	Boris Sekulić	End of contract		
21 June 2018	DF	(Serbia)	Boris Sekulić	(Bulgaria) CSKA Sofia	Free transfer	
17 July 2018	DF	(Greece)	Diamantis Chouchoumis	(Serbia) Vojvodina	Free transfer	
18 July 2018	DF	(Slovakia)	Erik Čikoš	(Hungary) Debrecen	Free transfer	
20 July 2018	MF	(Czech Republic)	Lukáš Droppa	(Kazakhstan) Shakhter Karagandy	Free transfer	
10 August 2018	MF	(Slovakia)	Filip Oršula	(Czech Republic) Slovan Liberec	Free transfer	
22 August 2018	MF	(Serbia)	Uroš Damnjanović	(Serbia) Radnički Niš	Free transfer	
27 September 2018	MF	(Slovakia)	Samuel Šefčík	(Czech Republic) Vysočina Jihlava	Free transfer	
1 January 2019	MF	(Netherlands)	Mitchell Schet	Released		
1 January 2019	MF	(Netherlands)	Ricky van Haaren	Released		
28 January 2019	DF	(Serbia)	Milan Rundić	(Czech Republic) Karviná	Free transfer	
28 January 2019	DF	(Slovakia)	Kornel Saláta	(Hungary) Szombathelyi Haladás	Free transfer	
31 January 2019	MF	(Montenegro)	Vukan Savićević	(Poland) Wisła Kraków	€50,000 (Note: Unofficial fee.)	
26 February 2019	DF	(Slovakia)	Juraj Kotula	(Czech Republic) Zbrojovka Brno	Free transfer	
2 March 2019	FW	(Slovakia)	Filip Hološko	(Czech Republic) Slovácko	Free transfer	
25 May 2019	FW	(Slovakia)	Róbert Vittek	Retired		

=== Loans out ===
Start date	Position	Nationality	Name	To	End date	Ref.
17 July 2018	DF	(Slovakia)	Juraj Kotula	(Slovakia) Senica	31 January 2019	
6 September 2018	DF	(Slovakia)	Samuel Kozlovský	(Slovakia) Petržalka	30 June 2019	
22 January 2019	MF	(Slovakia)	David Hrnčár	(Slovakia) Pohronie	30 June 2019	
21 February 2019	DF	(Slovakia)	Adam Laczkó	(Slovakia) Trenčín	31 December 2019	
21 February 2019	GK	(Slovakia)	Matúš Ružinský	(Slovakia) Šamorín	15 June 2019	

== Friendlies ==
Win Draw Loss

=== Pre-season ===
Friday, 15 June 2018	Slovan Bratislava (Slovakia)	2–0	(Slovakia) Pohronie	Bratislava, Slovakia
17:00 CEST (UTC+02:00)	Holman 45+1'; Cmiljanić 59'	Report		Stadium: Pasienky; Attendance: 200

Wednesday, 20 June 2018	Zbrojovka Brno (Czech Republic)	2–1	(Slovakia) Slovan Bratislava	Zastávka, Czech Republic
16:30 CEST (UTC+02:00)	Škoda 28'; Jambor 73'	Report	Rabiu (red card) 29' (substitution was enabled); Čavrić 54' (pen.)	Attendance: 450

Saturday, 23 June 2018 Semi-finals	Mladá Boleslav (Czech Republic)	2–2 (6–5 p)	(Slovakia) Slovan Bratislava	Benátky nad Jizerou, Czech Republic
12:00 CEST (UTC+02:00)	Novák 54'; Komlichenko 87' (pen.)	Report	Šporar 44'; Nono (yellow card) 67'; Saláta 90+2'
	Penalties
	Komlichenko (penalty scored); Matějovský (penalty scored); Novák (penalty scored); Hůlka (penalty scored); Vejr (penalty scored); Král (penalty scored)		(penalty scored) Holman; (penalty scored) Nono; (penalty scored) Cmiljanić; (penalty scored) Bozhikov; (penalty scored) Moha; (penalty missed) Šporar

Saturday, 23 June 2018 Third place play-off	Hradec Králové (Czech Republic)	1–1 (4–2 p)	(Slovakia) Slovan Bratislava	Benátky nad Jizerou, Czech Republic
14:30 CEST (UTC+02:00)	Miker 69'	Report	Strelec 7'
	Penalties
	Schwarz (penalty scored); Urma (penalty missed); Martinec (penalty scored); Plašil (penalty scored); Miker (penalty scored)		(penalty scored) Schet; (penalty scored) van Haaren; (penalty missed) Šporar; (penalty missed) Hrnčár

Friday, 29 June 2018 Pohár Ferdinanda Daučíka	Slavia Prague (Czech Republic)	0–1	(Slovakia) Slovan Bratislava	Prague, Czech Republic
18:30 CEST (UTC+02:00)	van Buren (penalty missed) 86'	Report	Moha (yellow card) 44'; Šporar 51'; Apau (yellow card) 53'; Šulla (yellow card) 86'	Stadium: Eden Aréna; Attendance: 5,000

Thursday, 5 July 2018	Slovan Bratislava (Slovakia)	5–0	(Mexico) Club América	Bratislava, Slovakia
19:00 CEST (UTC+02:00)	Šporar 7'; Holman 24'; Moha 36' (pen.), 47'; Cmiljanić 89'	Report		Stadium: Pasienky

=== On-season ===
Saturday, 17 November 2018	Slovan Bratislava (Slovakia)	3–1	(Belarus) Dynamo Brest	Bratislava, Slovakia
14:00 CET (UTC+01:00)	Čavrić 19'; Hološko 25'; Rigo 55' (pen.)	Report	Khoblenko 65'	Stadium: Pasienky

=== Mid-season ===
Wednesday, 16 January 2019	Slovan Bratislava (Slovakia)	2–3	(Czech Republic) Sigma Olomouc	Bratislava, Slovakia
17:00 CET (UTC+01:00)	Moha 26'; Medveděv 72'	Report	Jemelka 53'; Yunis 60'; Zahradníček 88'	Stadium: Tehelné pole Attendance: 2,183

Saturday, 19 January 2019 Tipsport liga Semi-finals	Mladá Boleslav (Czech Republic)	1–2	(Slovakia) Slovan Bratislava	Malta
13:30 CET (UTC+01:00)	Hašek (yellow card) 5'; Přikryl (yellow card) 51'; Fulnek 67'	Report	Šporar 20'; Čavrić 28'

Monday, 21 January 2019 Tipsport liga Final	Zbrojovka Brno (Czech Republic)	3–0	(Slovakia) Slovan Bratislava	Malta
13:30 CET (UTC+01:00)	Sukup (yellow card) 25'; Šumbera 33'; Bariš 42'; Pavlík 44'; Přichystal (yellow card) 45+1'; Kryštůfek (yellow card) 57'; Sedlák (yellow card) 87'	Report	Apau (yellow card) 43'; Ljubičić (yellow card) 58'; Bajrić (yellow card) 89'

Thursday, 24 January 2019	Gżira United (Malta)	3–4	(Slovakia) Slovan Bratislava	Malta
20:00 CET (UTC+01:00)	Operi 20'; Conti 29'; Soares 45'	Report	Bozhikov 4'; Cmiljanić 17'; Moha 30'; Nono 81'

Wednesday, 30 January 2019	Rubin Kazan (Russia)	2–2	(Slovakia) Slovan Bratislava	Belek, Turkey
15:00 CET (UTC+01:00)	Kambolov 58' (pen.); Stepanov 70'	Report	Čavrić 1'; Šporar 77' (pen.)

Saturday, 2 February 2019	Tromsø (Norway)	3–2	(Slovakia) Slovan Bratislava	Belek, Turkey
14:00 CET (UTC+01:00)	Ingebrigtsen 6', 20'; Valakari 25'	Report	Čavrić 37'; Moha 74'

Tuesday, 5 February 2019	Shonan Bellmare (Japan)	2–4	(Slovakia) Slovan Bratislava	Belek, Turkey
13:30 CET (UTC+01:00)		Report	Šporar 2', 66'; Ljubičić 75', 80'

Saturday, 9 February 2019	Spartak Moscow (Russia)	1–3	(Slovakia) Slovan Bratislava	Belek, Turkey
16:00 CET (UTC+01:00)	Melkadze 84'	Report	Šporar 21', 47'; Holman 30'

== Competition overview ==
Competition	First match	Last match	Starting round	Final position	Record							
Competition	First match	Last match	Starting round	Final position	Pld	W	D	L	GF	GA	GD	Win %
Fortuna liga	22 July 2018	24 May 2019	Matchday 1	1st	32	25	5	2	84	33	+51	78.13
Slovak Cup	29 August 2018		Second round	Second round	1	0	0	1	0	3	−3	0.00
Europa League	12 July 2018	16 August 2018	First qualifying round	Third qualifying round	6	4	0	2	15	10	+5	66.67
Total					39	29	5	5	99	46	+53	74.36

Source: Competitions

== Fortuna liga ==
=== League table ===
==== Regular stage ====
Pos	Team	Pld	W	D	L	GF	GA	GD	Pts	Qualification
1	Slovan Bratislava	22	18	4	0	53	18	+35	58	Qualification for the championship group
2	Žilina	22	13	5	4	39	23	+16	44	Qualification for the championship group
3	DAC Dunajská Streda	22	13	5	4	42	27	+15	44	Qualification for the championship group
4	Ružomberok	22	9	9	4	34	20	+14	36	Qualification for the championship group
5	Zemplín Michalovce	22	9	5	8	29	33	−4	32	Qualification for the championship group
6	Sereď	22	9	4	9	27	29	−2	31	Qualification for the championship group

Source: Niké liga (in Slovak)
Rules for classification: 1) Points; 2) Head-to-head points; 3) Head-to-head goal difference; 4) Head-to-head away goals scored; 5) Play-off.

==== Championship group ====
Pos	Team	Pld	W	D	L	GF	GA	GD	Pts	Qualification	SLO	DAC	RUŽ	ŽIL	ZMI	SER
1	Slovan Bratislava (C)	32	25	5	2	84	33	+51	80	Qualification for the Champions League first qualifying round	—	3–1	3–2	6–2	4–1	3–1
2	DAC Dunajská Streda	32	19	6	7	63	37	+26	63	Qualification for the Europa League first qualifying round	1–0	—	1–1	1–0	5–0	3–4
3	Ružomberok	32	15	11	6	50	31	+19	56	Qualification for the Europa League first qualifying round	3–2	1–0	—	1–1	1–0	1–0
4	Žilina	32	16	6	10	56	44	+12	54		0–3	1–2	4–2	—	4–0	1–2
5	Zemplín Michalovce	32	11	7	14	39	58	−19	40		3–3	0–2	0–3	2–1	—	2–0
6	Sereď	32	11	5	16	39	54	−15	38		1–4	0–5	0–1	2–3	2–2	—

Source: Niké liga (in Slovak)
Legend: Blue = home team win; Yellow = draw; Red = away team win.
Rules for classification: 1) Points; 2) Head-to-head points; 3) Head-to-head goal difference; 4) Head-to-head away goals scored; 5) Play-off.
(C) Champions

=== Results summary ===
Overall								Home						Away					
Pld	W	D	L	GF	GA	GD	Pts	W	D	L	GF	GA	GD	W	D	L	GF	GA	GD
32	25	5	2	84	33	+51	80	12	4	0	50	20	+30	13	1	2	34	13	+21

=== Results by matchday ===
Round	1	2	3	4	5	6	7	8	9	10	11	12	13	14	15	16	17	18	19	20	21	22	23	24	25	26	27	28	29	30	31	32
Ground	A	H	A	H	A	H	A	H	H	A	H	H	A	H	A	H	A	H	A	A	H	A	A	H	H	A	H	A	A	H	A	H
Result	W	W	W	D	W	D	W	W	W	W	D	W	W	W	W	D	W	W	W	W	W	W	W	W	W	W	W	L	L	W	D	W
Position	1	1	1	1	1	1	1	1	1	1	1	1	1	1	1	1	1	1	1	1	1	1	1	1	1	1	1	1	1	1	1	1
Points	3	6	9	10	13	14	17	20	23	26	27	30	33	36	39	40	43	46	49	52	55	58	61	64	67	70	73	73	73	76	77	80

A = Away; H = Home; W = Win; D = Draw; L = Loss

=== Matches ===
Regular stage

Sunday, 22 July 2018 1	Zlaté Moravce	1–4	Slovan Bratislava	Zlaté Moravce
19:00 CEST (UTC+02:00)	Brašeň 14'; Orávik (yellow card) 30'; Urgela (yellow card) 35'; Ľupták (yellow card) 50'	Report	Holman 15'; Nono (yellow card) 26'; Cmiljanić 54'; Savićević 62'; Šporar 72'	Stadium: Štadión FC ViOn; Attendance: 2,856

Sunday, 29 July 2018 2	Slovan Bratislava	3–0	Podbrezová	Bratislava
19:00 CEST (UTC+02:00)	Bozhikov 4'; Šporar 65', 77'	Report	Obročník (yellow card) 18'; Baran (yellow card) 26'; Leško (yellow card) 57'	Stadium: Pasienky; Attendance: 1,220

Sunday, 5 August 2018 3	Zemplín Michalovce	1–2	Slovan Bratislava	Michalovce
19:00 CEST (UTC+02:00)	Žofčák (yellow card) 35'; Carrillo (yellow card) 75'; Bednár 90+2'	Report	Hološko 6' van Haaren 25'; Savićević (yellow card) 68'	Stadium: Mestský futbalový štadión Attendance: 2,226

Sunday, 12 August 2018 4	Slovan Bratislava	1–1	Nitra	Bratislava
19:00 CEST (UTC+02:00)	Šporar 88'	Report	Taiwo 44'; Fábry (yellow card) 74'; Hroššo (yellow card) 88'	Stadium: Pasienky; Attendance: 1,152

Sunday, 19 August 2018 5	Ružomberok	0–2	Slovan Bratislava	Ružomberok
18:00 CEST (UTC+02:00)	Kostadinov (yellow card) 28' (yellow-red card) 33'; Urdinov (yellow card) 39'	Report	Čavrić (yellow card) 9' (yellow-red card) 39'; Apau 76'; Šporar 79'	Stadium: Štadión pod Čebraťom; Attendance: 2,486

Sunday, 26 August 2018 6	Slovan Bratislava	3–3	Trenčín	Bratislava
17:30 CEST (UTC+02:00)	Šporar 2'; Dražić 28'; Apau 38'; Nono (yellow card) 86'; Greif (yellow card) 87'	Report	Čataković 44', 88' (pen.), (yellow card) 69' van Arnhem (yellow card) 51'; Ubbink (yellow card) 53'; Mance 86'	Stadium: Pasienky; Attendance: 1,567

Saturday, 1 September 2018 7	Žilina	0–1	Slovan Bratislava	Žilina
16:45 CEST (UTC+02:00)	Škvarka (yellow card) 41'	Report	Savićević (yellow card) 45'; Saláta 69'; Nono (yellow card) 88'; Dražić (yellow card) 90+2'; Šporar (yellow card) 90+4'	Stadium: Štadión pod Dubňom; Attendance: 3,364

Saturday, 15 September 2018 8	Slovan Bratislava	3–2	DAC Dunajská Streda	Bratislava
16:45 CEST (UTC+02:00)	Moha 15'; Šporar 19', 73' de Kamps (yellow card) 89'	Report	Kalmár (yellow card) 21'; Davis (yellow card) 31'; Bayo 76', (yellow card) 82' (yellow-red card) 89'; Herc 80'	Stadium: Pasienky; Attendance: 3,919

Saturday, 22 September 2018 9	Slovan Bratislava	2–1	Sereď	Bratislava
19:00 CEST (UTC+02:00)	Saláta 11', (yellow card) 88'; Čavrić 21'	Report	Mečiar (yellow card) 8'; Gatarić 23'; Menich (yellow card) 35'; Michalík (yellow card) 48'; Sus (yellow card) 49'	Stadium: Pasienky; Attendance: 1,031

Saturday, 29 September 2018 10	Spartak Trnava	1–2	Slovan Bratislava	Trnava
18:00 CEST (UTC+02:00)	Bakoš (yellow card) 5', (goal) 45+2'; Greššák (yellow card) 11'; Chanturishvili (yellow card) 55'; Kadlec (yellow card) 75'	Report	Apau (yellow card) 7'; Dražić (yellow card) 18', (goal) 78'; Šporar 42'; Nono (yellow card) 48' de Kamps (yellow card) 68'	Stadium: Štadión Antona Malatinského; Attendance: 6,346

Saturday, 6 October 2018 11	Slovan Bratislava	2–2	Senica	Bratislava
17:00 CEST (UTC+02:00)	Moha 57', 60'	Report	Castañeda 8', (yellow card) 10'; Segbé Azankpo (yellow card) 18'; Asmah 54'; Otrísal (yellow card) 64'; Petshi (yellow card) 90+3'	Stadium: Pasienky; Attendance: 1,094

Saturday, 20 October 2018 12	Slovan Bratislava	3–1	Zlaté Moravce	Bratislava
17:00 CEST (UTC+02:00)	Bajrić (yellow card) 17'; Šporar 29', 71' (pen.); Moha 33'; Ljubičić (yellow card) 65'	Report	Ďubek 18' (pen.), (yellow card) 40'; Richtárech (yellow card) 25'	Stadium: Pasienky; Attendance: 1,160

Saturday, 27 October 2018 13	Podbrezová	0–2	Slovan Bratislava	Podbrezová
16:00 CEST (UTC+02:00)	Sedláček (yellow card) 28'; Lepieš (yellow card) 44'; Baran (yellow card) 46'	Report	Bajrić 2' de Kamps (yellow card) 64'; Ljubičić 73'	Stadium: ZELPO Aréna; Attendance: 1,588

Saturday, 3 November 2018 14	Slovan Bratislava	6–0	Zemplín Michalovce	Bratislava
17:00 CET (UTC+01:00)	Carrillo 5' (o.g.); Moha 20', 77'; Šporar 26'; Sukhotskyi (yellow card) 43'; Beskorovainyi 48' (o.g.); Čavrić 67' (pen.)	Report	Nawotka (yellow card) 55'; Beskorovainyi (yellow card) 66'; Regáli (yellow card) 90'	Stadium: Pasienky; Attendance: 1,099

Sunday, 11 November 2018 15	Nitra	1–2	Slovan Bratislava	Nitra
15:00 CET (UTC+01:00)	Križan (yellow card) 27'; Kóňa (yellow card) 39' (yellow-red card) 82'; Hroššo (yellow card) 45+1'; Fábry 46', (yellow card) 58'; Niba (yellow card) 60', (red card) 86'	Report	Šporar 37' (pen.), (yellow card) 27' (yellow-red card) 60'; Holman 45+1'; Ljubičić (yellow card) 72'; Moha (yellow card) 90+2'; Bozhikov (yellow card) 90+5'	Stadium: Štadión pod Zoborom; Attendance: 2,412

Saturday, 24 November 2018 16	Slovan Bratislava	1–1	Ružomberok	Bratislava
14:00 CET (UTC+01:00)	Holman 75'	Report	Qose 44'; Maslo (yellow card) 66'; Kružliak (yellow card) 90'; Macík (yellow card) 90+5'	Stadium: Pasienky; Attendance: 1,091

Saturday, 1 December 2018 17	Trenčín	0–3	Slovan Bratislava	Myjava
13:45 CET (UTC+01:00)	Yem (yellow card) 1'; Mance (yellow card) 67'	Report	Šporar 7'; Ljubičić 27'; Moha 59'	Stadium: Štadión Spartaka Myjava; Attendance: 367

Saturday, 8 December 2018 18	Slovan Bratislava	5–2	Žilina	Bratislava
13:45 CET (UTC+01:00)	Sukhotskyi 11'; Ljubičić 31'; Šporar 40' (pen.); Apau 42'; Strelec 62'; Dražić (yellow card) 75'	Report	Káčer (yellow card) 49', (penalty missed) 69'; Boženík 69'; Díaz (yellow card) 70'; Kaša 86'	Stadium: Pasienky; Attendance: 1,370

Saturday, 16 February 2019 19	DAC Dunajská Streda	0–1	Slovan Bratislava	Dunajská Streda
16:00 CET (UTC+01:00)	K. Vida (yellow card) 85'; Kalmár (yellow card) 90+2'	Report	Ljubičić (yellow card) 66'; Šporar 79' (pen.), (yellow card) 90+2'; Moha (yellow card) 90+4'	Stadium: MOL Aréna; Attendance: 12,135

Saturday, 23 February 2019 20	Sereď	0–1	Slovan Bratislava	Nitra
14:00 CET (UTC+01:00)	Michalík (yellow card) 21' (yellow-red card) 46'; Morong (yellow card) 34'	Report	Šporar 24', (yellow card) 64'; Medveděv (yellow card) 65'; Dražić (yellow card) 73'; Bajrić (yellow card) 75'	Stadium: Štadión pod Zoborom; Attendance: 723

Sunday, 3 March 2019 21	Slovan Bratislava	2–0	Spartak Trnava	Bratislava
18:00 CET (UTC+01:00)	Šporar 50', 86'; Moha (yellow card) 58'	Report	Dudl (yellow card) 25'; Yilmaz (yellow card) 46'; Grendel (yellow card) 52'; Abena (yellow card) 58'; Turňa (yellow card) 60'	Stadium: Tehelné pole Attendance: 22,500

Saturday, 9 March 2019 22	Senica	1–2	Slovan Bratislava	Senica
14:00 CET (UTC+01:00)	Asmah (yellow card) 15'; El Moudane (yellow card) 40'; Tešija 40' (pen.), (yellow card) 75'; Deretti (yellow card) 54'; Krč (yellow card) 89'	Report	Moha 1'; Šporar (penalty missed) 16'; Bozhikov (yellow card) 38'; Ljubičić 57'; Holman (yellow card) 66' de Kamps (yellow card) 71'	Stadium: Štadión FK Senica; Attendance: 1,214

Championship group

Saturday, 16 March 2019 23 / Championship group round 1	Sereď	1–4	Slovan Bratislava	Nitra
15:30 CET (UTC+01:00)	Menich (yellow card) 40'; Lačný 59'; Morong (yellow card) 73'; Michalík (yellow card) 75'	Report	Strelec 2'; Ljubičić 42'; Sukhotskyi (yellow card) 45'; Adekuoroye 70' (o.g.); Šporar 80'; Rabiu (yellow card) 89'	Stadium: Štadión pod Zoborom; Attendance: 795

Sunday, 31 March 2019 24 / 2	Slovan Bratislava	3–1	DAC Dunajská Streda	Bratislava
15:00 CEST (UTC+02:00)	Strelec (yellow card) 36'; Čavrić 47'; Bajrić (yellow card) 50'; Dražić 63'; Moha (penalty missed) 83'; Šporar 90'	Report	Kone (yellow card) 10'; Herc (yellow card) 20' (yellow-red card) 31'; Kalmár (yellow card) 31'; Davis 51' (pen.), (yellow card) 78'; Čmelík (yellow card) 57'	Stadium: Tehelné pole Attendance: 14,030

Sunday, 7 April 2019 25 / 3	Slovan Bratislava	4–1	Zemplín Michalovce	Bratislava
15:00 CEST (UTC+02:00)	Moha 8'; Holman 54'; Čavrić 80'; Ljubičić 83'	Report	Beskorovainyi (yellow card) 25'; Sulley 51'; Trusa (yellow card) 57'	Stadium: Tehelné pole Attendance: 8,350

Sunday, 14 April 2019 26 / 4	Žilina	0–3	Slovan Bratislava	Žilina
15:00 CEST (UTC+02:00)	Sluka (yellow card) 44'	Report	Moha 21', 42'; Ljubičić 62'	Stadium: Štadión pod Dubňom; Attendance: 5,478

Sunday, 21 April 2019 27 / 5	Slovan Bratislava	3–2	Ružomberok	Bratislava
15:00 CEST (UTC+02:00)	Šporar 20', 62' (pen.); Dražić 74'	Report	Kružliak 48'; Jedinák 90'	Stadium: Tehelné pole Attendance: 6,845

Saturday, 27 April 2019 28 / 6	DAC Dunajská Streda	1–0	Slovan Bratislava	Dunajská Streda
15:30 CEST (UTC+02:00)	Kalmár (yellow card) 37'; K. Vida 54'; Kone (red card) 59'; Jedlička (yellow card) 76'; Divković (yellow card) 90'	Report	Rabiu (yellow card) 39'; Šporar (penalty missed) 60'; Bajrić (yellow card) 63'; Nono (yellow card) 90+3'	Stadium: MOL Aréna; Attendance: 11,820

Sunday, 5 May 2019 29 / 7	Ružomberok	3–2	Slovan Bratislava	Ružomberok
15:00 CEST (UTC+02:00)	Gerec 16'; Mustedanagić (yellow card) 28', (goal) 45+1'; Jonec (yellow card) 62'; Qose 73'; Kružliak (yellow card) 83'	Report	Holman 7', (yellow card) 47'; Ljubičić 87'	Stadium: Štadión pod Čebraťom; Attendance: 1,448

Saturday, 11 May 2019 30 / 8	Slovan Bratislava	6–2	Žilina	Bratislava
15:00 CEST (UTC+02:00)	Šporar 3', 58', 80'; Holman 32', (yellow card) 52'; Dražić 43'; Ljubičić (yellow card) 81'; Moha 84'	Report	Gamboš 49'; Vallo 74'	Stadium: Tehelné pole Attendance: 12,533

Saturday, 18 May 2019 31 / 9	Zemplín Michalovce	3–3	Slovan Bratislava	Michalovce
17:00 CEST (UTC+02:00)	Casado 25'; Diarra 28' (pen.); Turík 68'; Tounkara (yellow card) 70'; Vojtko (yellow card) 77'; Kolesár (yellow card) 85'	Report	Šporar 39', 76'; Dražić 61'; Sukhotskyi (yellow card) 87'	Stadium: Mestský futbalový štadión Attendance: 1,186

Friday, 24 May 2019 32 / 10	Slovan Bratislava	3–1	Sereď	Bratislava
19:00 CEST (UTC+02:00)	Dražić 4'; Šporar 55' (pen.), (yellow card) 89'; Ratão 68'	Report	Baéz (yellow card) 19'; Michalík (yellow card) 41'; Nwolokor (yellow card) 54'; Menich 65', (yellow card) 89'	Stadium: Tehelné pole Attendance: 11,330

== Slovak Cup ==
Wednesday, 29 August 2018 Second round	Horné Orešany (5)	3–0 (awd.)	Slovan Bratislava (1)	Horné Orešany
17:00 CEST (UTC+02:00)	Hodulík (yellow card) 88'	Report	Hološko 26'; Cmiljanić 32'; Laczkó (yellow card) 85'	Stadium: Štadión Horné Orešany; Attendance: 1,387
Note: Originally, Slovan won 2–0, but violated the rules of the competition by using Marin Ljubičić, who had already played for a different club in the same round. The home team were awarded a technical 3–0 victory and advanced to the next round.

== UEFA Europa League ==
=== First qualifying round ===
Thursday, 12 July 2018 First leg	Milsami Orhei (Moldova)	2–4	(Slovakia) Slovan Bratislava	Orhei, Moldova
19:00 CEST (UTC+02:00)	Bolohan (yellow card) 47'; Crăciun (yellow card) 49'; Bugaev 59'; Cojocari (yellow card) 60'; Surdu 75'	Report	Holman (yellow card) 2'; Moha 10', 41'; Šporar 22', (yellow card) 83'; Apau (yellow card) 55'; Crăciun 79' (o.g.); Nono (yellow card) 90+2'	Stadium: CSR Orhei; Attendance: 1,852

Thursday, 19 July 2018 Second leg	Slovan Bratislava (Slovakia)	5–0 (9–2 agg.)	(Moldova) Milsami Orhei	Bratislava, Slovakia
18:30 CEST (UTC+02:00)	Šporar 15', 25'; Moha 33', 77'; Cmiljanić 52'	Report	Rusnac (yellow card) 28'; S. Plătică (yellow card) 85'; M. Plătică (yellow card) 89'	Stadium: Pasienky; Attendance: 3,175

=== Second qualifying round ===
Thursday, 26 July 2018 First leg	Balzan (Malta)	2–1	(Slovakia) Slovan Bratislava	Ta' Qali, Malta
18:00 CEST (UTC+02:00)	Kaljević 17'; Ljubomirać 67'	Report	Rabiu (yellow card) 67'; Savićević 73'	Stadium: Centenary Stadium; Attendance: 558

Thursday, 2 August 2018 Second leg	Slovan Bratislava (Slovakia)	3–1 (4–3 agg.)	(Malta) Balzan	Bratislava, Slovakia
19:30 CEST (UTC+02:00)	Čavrić 7', (penalty missed) 59'; Šporar 70', 71'; Šulla (yellow card) 76'; Hološko (yellow card) 89'; Bozhikov (yellow card) 90+3'	Report	Božović (yellow card) 44'; Kaljević (yellow card) 58'; Cadú 77', (yellow card) 90+1'; Šljivić (yellow card) 90+2'	Stadium: Pasienky; Attendance: 4,176

=== Third qualifying round ===
Thursday, 9 August 2018 First leg	Slovan Bratislava (Slovakia)	2–1	(Austria) Rapid Wien	Bratislava, Slovakia
21:05 CEST (UTC+02:00)	Bozhikov 29'; Moha (yellow card) 39'; Nono (yellow card) 43'; Barać 49' (o.g.); Saláta (yellow card) 79'; Hološko (yellow card) 83'	Report	Schwab 12'; Murg (yellow card) 52'; Alar (penalty missed) 84'; Potzmann (yellow card) 88'; Bolingoli-Mbombo (yellow card) 89'	Stadium: Pasienky; Attendance: 9,563

Thursday, 16 August 2018 Second leg	Rapid Wien (Austria)	4–0 (5–2 agg.)	(Slovakia) Slovan Bratislava	Vienna, Austria
20:30 CEST (UTC+02:00)	Knasmüllner 3', 79', 90+4'; Schwab (yellow card) 24'; Bolingoli-Mbombo (yellow card) 43'; Alar (yellow card) 45'; Potzmann (yellow card) 67'; Murg 84'	Report	Bozhikov (yellow card) 51'; Saláta (yellow card) 77'; Bajrić (yellow card) 79'; Nono (yellow card) 88'	Stadium: Allianz Stadion; Attendance: 17,800

== Statistics ==
As of match played 24 May 2019

=== Appearances ===
No.	Pos.	Nat.	Name	Fortuna liga		Europa League		Total	
No.	Pos.	Nat.	Name	Apps	Mins	Apps	Mins	Apps	Mins
1	GK	(Slovakia)	Dominik Greif	28	2,520	2	180	30	2,700
2	DF	(Netherlands)	Mitch Apau	25	2,186	6	530	31	2,716
3	DF	(Serbia)	Milan Rundić	1	58	0	0	1	58
4	MF	(Montenegro)	Vukan Savićević	16	534	6	249	22	783
6	MF	(Netherlands)	Joeri de Kamps	23	1,798	2	98	25	1,896
7	MF	(Morocco)	Moha	29	2,484	6	540	35	3,024
8	MF	(Croatia)	Marin Ljubičić	21	1,724	0	0	21	1,724
9	FW	(Slovenia)	Andraž Šporar	30	2,661	6	522	36	3,183
10	MF	(Nigeria)	Ibrahim Rabiu	8	365	4	232	12	597
11	MF	(Serbia)	Dejan Dražić	31	1,960	6	300	37	2,260
12	FW	(Montenegro)	Boris Cmiljanić	12	273	4	86	16	359
13	MF	(Spain)	Nono	14	766	6	414	20	1,180
15	MF	(Slovakia)	Denis Potoma	1	4	0	0	1	4
17	DF	(Czech Republic)	Jurij Medveděv	10	726	0	0	10	726
18	MF	(Slovakia)	David Hrnčár	1	5	0	0	1	5
19	DF	(Slovakia)	Kornel Saláta	12	922	3	270	15	1,192
20	DF	(Austria)	Stefan Stangl	1	58	0	0	1	58
20	MF	(Netherlands)	Ricky van Haaren	1	65	0	0	1	65
21	FW	(Slovakia)	Filip Hološko	9	206	3	15	12	221
21	FW	(Brazil)	Rafael Ratão	5	150	0	0	5	150
23	DF	(Ukraine)	Artem Sukhotskyi	26	2,314	3	270	29	2,584
24	FW	(Slovakia)	David Strelec	13	301	0	0	13	301
25	DF	(Slovakia)	Adam Laczkó	5	151	1	1	6	152
26	DF	(Hungary)	Richárd Guzmics	9	384	0	0	9	384
27	MF	(Hungary)	Dávid Holman	24	1,700	4	248	28	1,948
29	DF	(Bulgaria)	Vasil Bozhikov	24	2,086	6	540	30	2,626
30	GK	(Slovakia)	Michal Šulla	4	360	4	360	8	720
45	MF	(Serbia)	Aleksandar Čavrić	27	2,011	6	456	33	2,467
66	DF	(Slovenia)	Kenan Bajrić	31	2,790	6	540	37	3,330

=== Goalscorers ===
No.	Pos.	Nat.	Name	Fortuna liga	Europa League	Total
2	DF	(Netherlands)	Mitch Apau	3	0	3
4	MF	(Montenegro)	Vukan Savićević	1	1	2
7	MF	(Morocco)	Moha	12	4	16
8	MF	(Croatia)	Marin Ljubičić	8	0	8
9	FW	(Slovenia)	Andraž Šporar	29	5	34
11	MF	(Serbia)	Dejan Dražić	7	0	7
12	FW	(Montenegro)	Boris Cmiljanić	1	1	2
19	DF	(Slovakia)	Kornel Saláta	2	0	2
20	MF	(Netherlands)	Ricky van Haaren	1	0	1
21	FW	(Slovakia)	Filip Hološko	1	0	1
21	FW	(Brazil)	Rafael Ratão	1	0	1
23	DF	(Ukraine)	Artem Sukhotskyi	1	0	1
24	FW	(Slovakia)	David Strelec	2	0	2
27	MF	(Hungary)	Dávid Holman	6	0	6
29	DF	(Bulgaria)	Vasil Bozhikov	1	1	2
45	MF	(Serbia)	Aleksandar Čavrić	4	1	5
66	DF	(Slovenia)	Kenan Bajrić	1	0	1
Own goals				3	2	5
Total				84	15	99

=== Clean sheets ===
No.	Nat.	Name	Fortuna liga	Europa League	Total
1	(Slovakia)	Dominik Greif	9	0	9
30	(Slovakia)	Michal Šulla	1	1	2
Total			10	1	11

=== Disciplinary record ===
No.	Pos.	Nat.	Name	Fortuna liga			Europa League			Total		
No.	Pos.	Nat.	Name	Yellow card	(yellow card) (yellow-red card)	Red card	Yellow card	(yellow card) (yellow-red card)	Red card	Yellow card	(yellow card) (yellow-red card)	Red card
2	DF	(Netherlands)	Mitch Apau	1	0	0	1	0	0	2	0	0
4	MF	(Montenegro)	Vukan Savićević	2	0	0	0	0	0	2	0	0
6	MF	(Netherlands)	Joeri de Kamps	4	0	0	0	0	0	4	0	0
7	MF	(Morocco)	Moha	2	0	0	1	0	0	3	0	0
8	MF	(Croatia)	Marin Ljubičić	4	0	0	0	0	0	4	0	0
9	FW	(Slovenia)	Andraž Šporar	5	1	0	1	0	0	6	1	0
10	MF	(Nigeria)	Ibrahim Rabiu	2	0	0	1	0	0	3	0	0
11	MF	(Serbia)	Dejan Dražić	4	0	0	0	0	0	4	0	0
13	MF	(Spain)	Nono	5	0	0	3	0	0	8	0	0
17	DF	(Czech Republic)	Jurij Medveděv	1	0	0	0	0	0	1	0	0
19	DF	(Slovakia)	Kornel Saláta	1	0	0	2	0	0	3	0	0
21	FW	(Slovakia)	Filip Hološko	0	0	0	2	0	0	2	0	0
23	DF	(Ukraine)	Artem Sukhotskyi	3	0	0	0	0	0	3	0	0
24	FW	(Slovakia)	David Strelec	1	0	0	0	0	0	1	0	0
27	MF	(Hungary)	Dávid Holman	3	0	0	1	0	0	4	0	0
29	DF	(Bulgaria)	Vasil Bozhikov	2	0	0	2	0	0	4	0	0
30	GK	(Slovakia)	Michal Šulla	0	0	0	1	0	0	0	0	0
45	MF	(Serbia)	Aleksandar Čavrić	1	1	0	0	0	0	1	1	0
66	DF	(Slovenia)	Kenan Bajrić	4	0	0	1	0	0	5	0	0
Total				45	2	0	16	0	0	61	2	0

=== Attendances ===
==== Total ====
	Matches	Attendances	Average	High	Low
Fortuna liga	16	90,291	5,643	22,500	1,031
Europa League	3	16,914	5,638	9,563	3,175
Total	19	107,205	5,642	22,500	1,031

==== Before the winter break at the Pasienky Stadium ====
	Matches	Attendances	Average	High	Low
Fortuna liga	10	14,703	1,470	3,919	1,031
Europa League	3	16,914	5,638	9,563	3,175
Total	13	31,617	2,432	9,563	1,031

==== After the winter break at the Tehelné Pole Stadium ====
	Matches	Attendances	Average	High	Low
Fortuna liga	6	75,588	12,598	22,500	6,845
Total	6	75,588	12,598	22,500	6,845

== Awards ==
=== Fortuna liga Player of the Month ===
Month	Player	Ref
November/December	(Slovenia) Andraž Šporar	
May	(Slovenia) Andraž Šporar	

=== Fortuna liga Goal of the Month ===
Month	Player	Ref
September	(Morocco) Moha	

=== Fortuna liga Team of the Season ===
Position	Player	Ref
GK	(Slovakia) Dominik Greif	
DF	(Bulgaria) Vasil Bozhikov	
MF	(Croatia) Marin Ljubičić	
MF	(Serbia) Aleksandar Čavrić	
MF	(Morocco) Moha	
FW	(Slovenia) Andraž Šporar	

=== Fortuna liga Player of the Season ===
Season	Player	Ref
2018–19	(Slovenia) Andraž Šporar	

=== Fortuna liga Manager of the Season ===
Season	Manager	Ref
2018–19	(Slovakia) Martin Ševela	

=== Fortuna liga Top Scorer of the Season ===
Season	Player	Goals	Ref
2018–19	(Slovenia) Andraž Šporar	29	

=== Fortuna liga Under-21 Team of the Season ===
Position	Player	Ref
GK	(Slovakia) Dominik Greif	
