= 2010 UEFA Women's Under-17 Championship squads =

Football tournament squads

The following is a list of squads for each national team competing at the 2010 UEFA Women's Under-17 Championship in Switzerland.

== Netherlands ==
Head coach: Maria van Kortenhof

No.	Pos.	Player	Date of birth (age)	Club
1	GK	Robbin Huisman	21 May 1994 (aged 16)	(Royal Dutch Football Association) DVS '33
16	GK	Melissa van der Wiel	26 September 1993 (aged 16)	(Royal Dutch Football Association) Ter Leede
2	DF	Marlou Kelleners	20 December 1993 (aged 16)	(Royal Dutch Football Association) VV Born
3	DF	Myrusha Victoria	21 February 1994 (aged 16)	(Royal Dutch Football Association) Hollandia
4	DF	Kelly Zeeman	19 November 1993 (aged 16)	(Royal Dutch Football Association) SV Marken
5	DF	Paola van der Veen	25 February 1994 (aged 16)	(Royal Dutch Football Association) ADO Den Haag
15	DF	Manon Micka	16 May 1993 (aged 17)	(Royal Dutch Football Association) Ter Leede
6	MF	Nikki de Roest	2 April 1993 (aged 17)	(Royal Dutch Football Association) ASWH
8	MF	Maxime Scheepers	24 April 1993 (aged 17)	(Royal Dutch Football Association) VVV-Venlo
10	MF	Myrthe Moorrees	12 December 1994 (aged 15)	(Royal Dutch Football Association) RKSV Wittenhorst
12	MF	Dominique Bruinenberg	23 January 1993 (aged 17)	(Royal Dutch Football Association) Telstar
14	MF	Eshly Bakker	10 February 1993 (aged 17)	(Royal Dutch Football Association) ADO Den Haag
17	MF	Pascalle Tang	10 April 1993 (aged 17)	(Royal Dutch Football Association) Amstelveen/ Heemraad
18	MF	Vesna Veltrop	22 October 1993 (aged 16)	(Royal Dutch Football Association) Ajax
7	FW	Linda Bakker	13 February 1993 (aged 17)	(Royal Dutch Football Association) AZ
9	FW	Tashira Renfurm	17 September 1994 (aged 15)	(Royal Dutch Football Association) FC Twente
11	FW	Sanne Schoenmakers	8 April 1993 (aged 17)	(Royal Dutch Football Association) RKTSV Kerkrade
13	FW	Quinniver Lardinois	5 November 1994 (aged 15)	(German Football Association) Alemannia Aachen

== Spain ==
Head coach: Jorge Vilda

No.	Pos.	Player	Date of birth (age)	Club
1	GK	Berta Noguera	20 May 1993 (aged 17)	(Royal Spanish Football Federation) Sant Gabriel
13	GK	Lola Gallardo	10 June 1993 (aged 17)	(Royal Spanish Football Federation) Sevilla
2	DF	Ana Sáenz	5 February 1993 (aged 17)	(Royal Spanish Football Federation) Prainsa Zaragoza
3	DF	Ana María Catalá	20 July 1993 (aged 16)	(Royal Spanish Football Federation) Rayo Vallecano
4	DF	Ivana Andrés	13 July 1994 (aged 15)	(Royal Spanish Football Federation) Valencia
5	DF	Laura Gutiérrez	2 May 1994 (aged 16)	(Royal Spanish Football Federation) Barcelona
6	DF	Nagore Calderón	2 June 1993 (aged 17)	(Royal Spanish Football Federation) Atlético Madrid
14	DF	Arene Altonaga	25 February 1993 (aged 17)	(Royal Spanish Football Federation) Athletic Club
16	DF	Paula Nicart	8 September 1994 (aged 15)	(Royal Spanish Football Federation) Barcelona
7	MF	Gemma Gili	21 May 1994 (aged 16)	(Royal Spanish Football Federation) Valencia
8	MF	Marina García	3 August 1994 (aged 15)	(Royal Spanish Football Federation) Cáceres
12	MF	Sara Tazo	9 July 1993 (aged 16)	(Royal Spanish Football Federation) Aurrerá de Vitoria
15	MF	Iraia Pérez	14 January 1994 (aged 16)	(Royal Spanish Football Federation) Gasteiz Cup
17	MF	Sara Mérida	8 April 1993 (aged 17)	(Royal Spanish Football Federation) Espanyol
9	FW	Paloma Lázaro	28 September 1993 (aged 16)	(Royal Spanish Football Federation) Rayo Vallecano
10	FW	Amanda Sampedro	26 June 1993 (aged 16)	(Royal Spanish Football Federation) Atlético Madrid
11	FW	Alexia Putellas	2 April 1994 (aged 16)	(Royal Spanish Football Federation) Espanyol
18	FW	Raquel Pinel	30 August 1994 (aged 15)	(Royal Spanish Football Federation) Real Jaén

== Republic of Ireland ==
Head coach: Noel King

No.	Pos.	Player	Date of birth (age)	Club
1	GK	Grace Moloney	1 March 1993 (aged 17)	(The Football Association) Reading
16	GK	Amanda Budden	9 May 1994 (aged 16)	(Football Association of Ireland) Wilton United
2	DF	Ciara O'Brien	13 February 1993 (aged 17)	(Football Association of Ireland) Tramore
3	DF	Megan Campbell	28 June 1993 (aged 16)	(Football Association of Ireland) St Francis
4	DF	Jessica Gleeson	23 October 1993 (aged 16)	(Football Association of Ireland) Tramore
5	DF	Jennifer Byrne	5 March 1993 (aged 17)	(Football Association of Ireland) Bealnamulla
14	DF	Tanya Kennedy	8 July 1993 (aged 16)	(Irish Football Association) Finn Valley
15	DF	Kerry Glynn	14 April 1993 (aged 17)	(United States Soccer Federation) Montclair Thunderbolts
18	DF	Harriet Scott	10 February 1993 (aged 17)	(The Football Association) Reading
6	MF	Ciara Grant	11 June 1993 (aged 17)	(Football Association of Ireland) Kilmacrennan Celtic
7	MF	Aileen Gilroy	1 March 1993 (aged 17)	(Football Association of Ireland) Killala
8	MF	Dora Gorman	18 February 1993 (aged 17)	(Football Association of Ireland) Salthill Devon
11	MF	Siobhán Killeen	15 March 1993 (aged 17)	(Football Association of Ireland) Raheny United
12	MF	Stacie Donnelly	7 June 1993 (aged 17)	(The Football Association) Reading
9	FW	Niamh McLaughlin	31 August 1993 (aged 16)	(Football Association of Ireland) Greencastle
10	FW	Denise O'Sullivan	4 February 1994 (aged 16)	(Football Association of Ireland) Wilton United
13	FW	Rianna Jarrett	5 July 1994 (aged 15)	(Football Association of Ireland) North End United
17	FW	Clare Shine	18 May 1995 (aged 15)	(Football Association of Ireland) Douglas Hall

== Germany ==
Head coach: Ralf Peter

No.	Pos.	Player	Date of birth (age)	Club
1	GK	Lena Nuding	18 February 1993 (aged 17)	(German Football Association) VfL Sindelfingen
12	GK	Friederike Abt	7 July 1994 (aged 15)	(German Football Association) Herforder SV
2	DF	Claire Savin	2 April 1993 (aged 17)	(German Football Association) TSG Hoffenheim
3	DF	Luisa Wensing	8 February 1993 (aged 17)	(German Football Association) FCR Duisburg
4	DF	Kristin Demann	7 April 1993 (aged 17)	(German Football Association) Turbine Potsdam
5	DF	Jennifer Cramer	24 February 1993 (aged 17)	(German Football Association) Turbine Potsdam
7	DF	Annabel Jäger	6 January 1994 (aged 16)	(German Football Association) FSV Gütersloh
17	DF	Anne Rheinheimer	26 February 1993 (aged 17)	(German Football Association) 1. FFC Frankfurt
6	MF	Isabella Schmid	6 March 1993 (aged 17)	(German Football Association) SC Freiburg
8	MF	Lina Magull	15 August 1994 (aged 15)	(German Football Association) FSV Gütersloh
11	MF	Sarah Romert	13 December 1993 (aged 16)	(German Football Association) Bayern Munich
13	MF	Marie Pyko	8 August 1993 (aged 16)	(German Football Association) SC Bad Neuenahr
14	MF	Melanie Leupolz	14 April 1994 (aged 16)	(German Football Association) TSV Tettnang
15	MF	Natalie Moik	11 August 1993 (aged 16)	(German Football Association) Bayer Leverkusen
9	FW	Lena Petermann	5 February 1994 (aged 16)	(German Football Association) Hamburger SV
10	FW	Silvana Chojnowski (Note: Chojnowski was capped by Poland at senior level)	17 April 1994 (aged 16)	(German Football Association) FSV Frankfurt
16	FW	Lena Lotzen	11 September 1993 (aged 16)	(German Football Association) Bayern Munich
18	FW	Jana Blessing	27 May 1993 (aged 17)	(German Football Association) FV Löchgau
