= Mitch Apau =

Dutch footballer (born 1990)

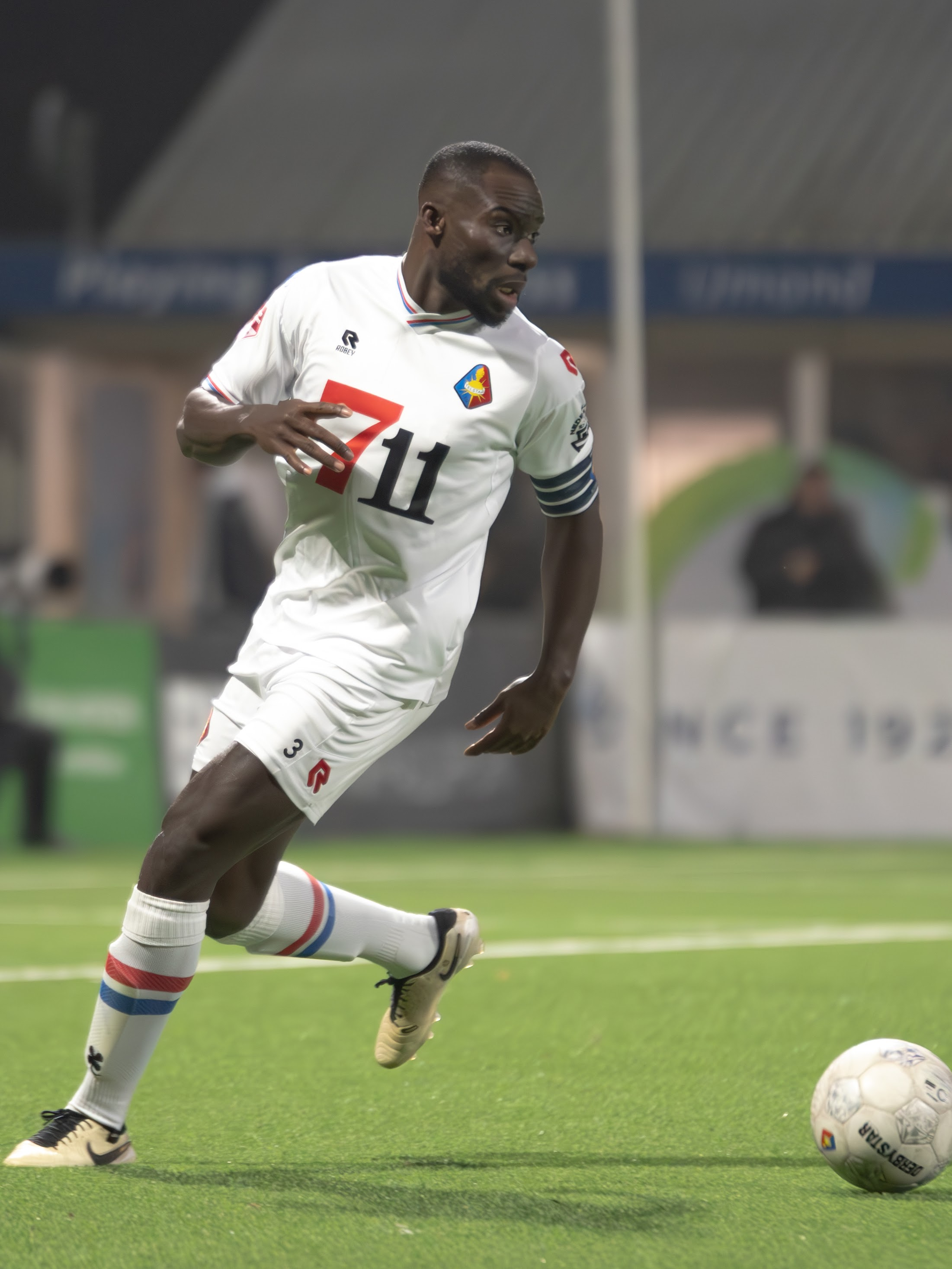
- Apau with Telstar in 2024

Personal information
- Date of birth: 27 April 1990 (age 36)
- Place of birth: Amsterdam, Netherlands
- Height: 1.81 m (5 ft 11 in)
- Position: Right-back

Team information
- Current team: Marken; Telstar (head scout)

Youth career
- 2000–2002: OSDO
- 2002–2003: Zeeburgia
- 2003–2005: AZ
- 2005–2007: Zeeburgia
- 2007–2009: Ajax

Senior career*
| Years | Team | Apps | (Gls) |
| 2009–2013 | Veendam | 106 | (2) |
| 2013–2014 | RKC Waalwijk | 29 | (0) |
| 2014–2017 | Westerlo | 87 | (4) |
| 2017–2018 | Olimpija Ljubljana | 36 | (1) |
| 2018–2020 | Slovan Bratislava | 37 | (3) |
| 2021 | Patro Eisden | 0 | (0) |
| 2021 | → Slaven Belupo (loan) | 5 | (0) |
| 2021–2022 | Emmen | 19 | (0) |
| 2022–2025 | Telstar | 113 | (2) |
| 2025–2026 | Spakenburg | 32 | (0) |
| 2026– | Marken | 0 | (0) |
- * Club domestic league appearances and goals as of 09:15, 22 May 2026 (UTC)

Mitch Apau (born 27 April 1990) is a Dutch professional footballer who plays as a right-back for Vierde Klasse club Marken and is the head scout of Eredivisie club Telstar.

Apau began his senior career with Veendam in 2009, remaining at the club until its bankruptcy in 2013. He subsequently joined RKC Waalwijk, before moving abroad in 2014 to sign with Belgian side Westerlo, where he established himself as a regular starter over three seasons. In 2017, he signed with Olimpija Ljubljana in Slovenia, winning both the Slovenian PrvaLiga and Slovenian Football Cup during his sole campaign. The following year, Apau moved to Slovan Bratislava, where he won back-to-back Slovak Super Liga titles in 2019 and 2020, and featured in both the UEFA Champions League and UEFA Europa League.

After brief spells with Patro Eisden and Croatian side NK Slaven Belupo in 2021, he returned to the Netherlands and achieved promotion to the Eredivisie with Emmen in 2022. He then joined Telstar, contributing to their own promotion to the Eredivisie in 2025. Later that year, Apau ended his professional career and signed for Tweede Divisie club Spakenburg.

== Career ==
=== Early years ===
Apau began his youth career at OSDO, Zeeburgia and AZ, before joining Ajax's under-19 team in 2007.

In 2009, he made a move to Veendam, where he made his professional debut in the second-tier Eerste Divisie on 7 August 2009 in a convincing 6–1 away victory against HFC Haarlem where Apau played the full game. In April 2011, his contract was extended until 2014. He scored his first goal on 18 September 2011, helping his team to a 3–0 home win over Emmen.

In March 2013, Veendam went bankrupt, making Apau a free agent. Apau then spent some time training with Groningen, before signing with RKC Waalwijk on 31 May 2013. With RKC, he faced relegation from the top-tier Eredivisie on 18 May 2014, following a loss on aggregate against Excelsior in the relegation play-offs.

=== Westerlo ===
On 6 June 2014, Apau signed with newly promoted Belgian Pro League club Westerlo, coached by compatriate Dennis van Wijk. There, he was reunited with Evander Sno, whom he had played alongside at RKC.

He impressed at Westerlo, and grew into one of the premier defenders in the league. In March 2015, Premier League club Chelsea, coached by José Mourinho, was rumoured to be interested in signing Apau, but in July 2016 he extended his contract with Westerlo by a year.

=== Olimpija Ljubljana ===
In July 2017, Apau moved to Slovenian PrvaLiga club Olimpija Ljubljana. He made his league debut for Ljubljana on 16 July 2017, the first matchday of the season, replacing Aris Zarifović in the 84th minute of a 3–1 home victory against Celje. He scored his first and only goal for Olimpija on 31 March 2018, in a 1–1 draw against Maribor. Throughout the season, he scored the one goal in 36 league appearances for Olimpija, adding four assists to his tally, as the club won the domestic double.

=== Slovan Bratislava ===
In June 2018, Apau joined Fortuna Liga club Slovan Bratislava on a three-year deal. He was given the number two jersey, and joined the team in training camp in the Czech Republic.

He made his debut for the club in the first qualifying round of the 2018–19 UEFA Europa League, starting in the 4–2 away victory against Moldovan club Milsami Orhei. He also appeared in the following qualifiers, in which Slovan knocked out Maltese side Balzan on aggregate, before his team were eliminated by Austrian club Rapid Wien in the third qualifying round.

He made his league debut for the club on 22 July 2018, the opening matchday of the season, playing the full nintety minutes in a 4–1 away victory over ViOn Zlaté Moravce. On 19 August, he scored his first goal for Slovan against MFK Ružomberok after beautiful hold-up play by Vukan Savićević, which gave his team the go-ahead lead in the 76th minute of an eventual 2–0 win. He scored his second league goal of the season in a 3–3 draw against AS Trenčín. He scored his third of the season on 8 December 2018 in a game against MŠK Žilina, lifting Slovan to a 4–0 lead in the 42nd minute, as the match would go on to end 5–2. He won league title with Slovan on 14 April 2019, six games before the end of the season, after a 3–0 win against Žilina.

Apau was a starter for Slovan in the first leg of the first qualifying round of the 2019–20 UEFA Champions League against Montenegrin champions Sutjeska Nikšić. Slovan were eliminated on aggregate, and Apau made appearances in all subsequent qualifying rounds of the Europa League, helping his side to wins over Feronikeli 74, Dundalk and PAOK to qualify for the group stage. However, he did not make any appearances in the group stage, as he was not included in the final Europa League roster. He was part of the team defending the league title from the previous season with Slovan. In the same season, he also triumphed in the Slovak Cup with the club to secure a double.

Apau's contract was terminated by mutual consent on 12 October 2020, having only made one league appearance for Slovan that season.

=== Patro Eisden and Slaven Belupo ===
On 22 December 2020, it was announced that Apau had signed with Patro Eisden, starting from 1 January 2021.

He spent one month in Belgium without making an appearance, before being sent on a loan deal for the remainder of the season to Croatian club Slaven Belupo in February 2021. He made his debut for the club on 19 February, replacing Franjo Prce in the 77th minute of a 2–2 league draw against HNK Šibenik. Apau made seven total appearances for Slaven, before returning to Patro.

=== Emmen ===
On 30 July 2021, Apau joined Eerste Divisie club Emmen on a one-year deal, with an option for an additional season. He made his debut for the club on 13 August – the second matchday of the season – starting in a 1–0 home loss to Eindhoven before being replaced by Luciano Carty in the 83rd minute. Apau made 21 total appearances in the league and KNVB Cup for Emmen that season, contributing to the club winning the league title and returning to the top-tier Eredivisie.

=== Telstar ===
Apau moved to Eerste Divisie club Telstar in July 2022 after his contract with Emmen expired. He made his debut for the club on the first matchday of the season, starting in Telstar's 1–1 away draw against Jong Ajax. Afterwards, he remained a key player for the rest of the season, playing all 40 possible games as a starter and helping Telstar to ninth place in the table – their best season since 2018 and their second best since 2005.

On 29 May 2024, Apau extended his contract with Telstar by one season, keeping him at the club until 30 June 2025.

On 8 April 2025, Telstar announced that Apau would leave the club at the end of the 2024–25 season, marking the conclusion of his professional career. He subsequently agreed to join Spakenburg of the Tweede Divisie to continue playing at the amateur level. However, the contract included a clause stipulating that if Telstar achieved promotion to the Eredivisie through the play-offs, the agreement with Spakenburg would be voided, allowing Apau to reconsider his future. He featured in all of the club's subsequent play-off matches, including a 2–2 draw and 3–1 victory over Willem II in the final round, which secured Telstar's promotion to the Eredivisie for the first time in 47 years.

=== Later career ===
After Telstar won promotion to the Eredivisie in June 2025, Apau decided not to invoke the clause that would have allowed him to stay at the club, saying that he was putting his family first, and joined Tweede Divisie club Spakenburg as agreed.

In March 2026, Spakenburg announced that Apau would leave at the end of the 2025–26 season to continue playing at a lower level. The following month, Telstar appointed him as a scout for the first team, a role that also involved coordinating scouting within the youth academy; he was at the same time taking a KNVB course with the aim of becoming a technical director.

In the summer of 2026, Apau joined Marken of the Vierde Klasse, the ninth tier of Dutch football, combining playing there with his scouting work at Telstar.

== Personal life ==
Born in the Netherlands, Apau is of Ghanaian descent.

== Career statistics ==
Appearances and goals by club, season and competition
| Club | Season | League | | | National cup (Note: Includes KNVB Cup, Belgian Cup, Slovenian Football Cup, Slovak Cup) | | Europe | | Other | | Total | |
| Club | Season | Division | Apps | Goals | Apps | Goals | Apps | Goals | Apps | Goals | Apps | Goals |
|---|---|---|---|---|---|---|---|---|---|---|---|---|
| Veendam | 2009–10 | Eerste Divisie | 23 | 0 | 1 | 0 | — | | — | | 24 | 0 |
| Veendam | 2010–11 | Eerste Divisie | 28 | 0 | 2 | 0 | — | | 2 (Note: Appearances in Eredivisie promotion/relegation playoffs) | 0 | 32 | 0 |
| Veendam | 2011–12 | Eerste Divisie | 33 | 2 | 1 | 0 | — | | — | | 34 | 2 |
| Veendam | 2012–13 | Eerste Divisie | 22 | 0 | 1 | 0 | — | | — | | 23 | 0 |
| Veendam | Total | | 106 | 2 | 5 | 0 | — | | 2 | 0 | 113 | 2 |
| RKC Waalwijk | 2013–14 | Eredivisie | 29 | 0 | 1 | 0 | — | | 3 | 0 | 33 | 0 |
| Westerlo | 2014–15 | Belgian Pro League | 34 | 2 | 1 | 0 | — | | — | | 35 | 2 |
| Westerlo | 2015–16 | Belgian Pro League | 30 | 2 | 2 | 0 | — | | — | | 32 | 2 |
| Westerlo | 2016–17 | Belgian Pro League | 23 | 0 | 1 | 0 | — | | — | | 24 | 2 |
| Westerlo | Total | | 87 | 4 | 4 | 0 | — | | — | | 91 | 4 |
| Olimpija Ljubljana | 2017–18 | Slovenian PrvaLiga | 36 | 1 | 5 | 0 | — | | — | | 41 | 1 |
| Slovan Bratislava | 2018–19 | Slovak Super Liga | 25 | 3 | 0 | 0 | 6 (Note: Appearances in UEFA Europa League) | 0 | — | | 31 | 3 |
| Slovan Bratislava | 2019–20 | Slovak Super Liga | 11 | 0 | 1 | 0 | 2 (Note: One appearance in UEFA Champions League, one appearance in UEFA Europa League) | 0 | — | | 14 | 0 |
| Slovan Bratislava | 2020–21 | Slovak Super Liga | 1 | 0 | 0 | 0 | — | | — | | 1 | 0 |
| Slovan Bratislava | Total | | 37 | 3 | 1 | 0 | 7 | 0 | — | | 45 | 3 |
| Patro Eisden | 2020–21 | Belgian National Division 1 | 0 | 0 | — | | — | | — | | 0 | 0 |
| Slaven Belupo (loan) | 2020–21 | Croatian Football League | 5 | 0 | 2 | 0 | — | | — | | 7 | 1 |
| Emmen | 2021–22 | Eerste Divisie | 19 | 0 | 2 | 0 | — | | — | | 21 | 0 |
| Telstar | 2022–23 | Eerste Divisie | 38 | 1 | 2 | 0 | — | | — | | 40 | 1 |
| Telstar | 2023–24 | Eerste Divisie | 37 | 1 | 1 | 0 | — | | — | | 38 | 1 |
| Telstar | 2024–25 | Eerste Divisie | 38 | 0 | 2 | 0 | — | | 6 | 0 | 46 | 0 |
| Telstar | Total | | 113 | 2 | 5 | 0 | — | | 6 | 0 | 124 | 2 |
| Spakenburg | 2025–26 | Tweede Divisie | 32 | 0 | 3 | 0 | — | | — | | 35 | 0 |
| Career total | | | 464 | 12 | 28 | 0 | 7 | 0 | 11 | 0 | 510 | 12 |

== Honours ==
Olimpija Ljubljana

- Slovenian PrvaLiga: 2017–18
- Slovenian Football Cup: 2017–18

Slovan Bratislava

- Slovak Super Liga: 2018–19, 2019–20
- Slovak Cup: 2019–20

Emmen

- Eerste Divisie: 2021–22
