= Karol Praženica =

Slovak footballer

Personal information
- Full name: Karol Praženica
- Date of birth: 15 November 1970 (age 55)
- Place of birth: Czechoslovakia
- Height: 1.80 m (5 ft 11 in)
- Position: Midfielder

Senior career*
| Years | Team | Apps | (Gls) |
| 1988–1991 | Dukla Banská Bystrica | 98 | (2) |
| 1991–1993 | Slavia Prague | 43 | (2) |
| 1993–1995 | Hajduk Split | 23 | (0) |
| 1995–1996 | OFI | 30 | (0) |
| 1996–1997 | Košice | 23 | (0) |
| 1997–1999 | Dukla Banská Bystrica | 20 | (0) |
| 1999–2000 | Fortuna Düsseldorf | | |
| 2000 | Dynamo České Budějovice | 7 | (0) |
| 2001–2003 | Sopron | 28 | (0) |

International career
| 1995–1997 | Slovakia | 6 | (0) |

Managerial career
- 2007–2008: Dukla Banská Bystrica
- 2013–2014: Rimavská Sobota
- 2014–2015: Liptovský Mikuláš
- 2015–2016: Dunajská Streda (assistant)
- 2017: ŽP Šport Podbrezová
- 2018–2020: ViOn Zlaté Moravce
- 2021: Senica
- * Club domestic league appearances and goals

Karol Praženica (born 15 November 1970) is a Slovak football manager and former player. He made six appearances for Slovakia, and at club level became the first footballer from his country to play in the group stage of the UEFA Champions League. As a head coach he has led a number of teams in the Slovak First Football League.

== Playing career ==
Praženica made 6 international appearances for the Slovakia national football team. He was a member of the Croatian championship-winning Hajduk Split squad during the 1994–95 season. During his time at Hajduk Split, he became the first Slovak player to play in the group stage of the UEFA Champions League.

== Coaching career ==
Praženica took over as ŽP Šport Podbrezová head coach in 2017, five matches before the end of the season. After eight games of the 2017–18 Slovak First Football League, with Podbrezová second from last with four points, he was replaced by Marek Fabuľa, who he had previously replaced.

In December 2018, Praženica replaced Juraj Jarábek as head coach of Zlaté Moravce, who were at the time bottom of the 2018–19 Slovak First Football League. After Zlaté Moravce scored 23 points in the spring part of the season, including a win in their last game of the season, 1–0 against Nitra, their status as a top-flight team was preserved for another season. After a year and a half at the club, Zlaté Moravce announced in June 2020 that Praženica would be replaced by assistant coach Branislav Mráz for the final two matches of the extended 2019–20 Slovak First Football League season, before taking on a new head coach.

Praženica was appointed head coach of Senica in February 2021. After leading Senica to an 11th place finish in the 2020–21 Slovak First Football League, avoiding relegation after a playoff victory against Dukla Banská Bystrica, he was replaced by Czech coach Pavel Šustr.
