= Carlos Hasselbaink =

Dutch footballer

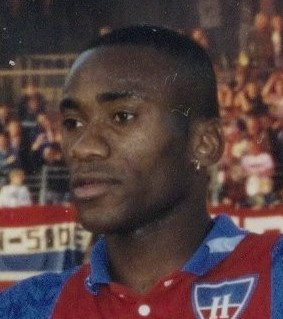
- Hasselbaink in 1997

Personal information
- Date of birth: 13 December 1968 (age 57)
- Place of birth: Paramaribo, Suriname
- Height: 1.80 m (5 ft 11 in)
- Position: Striker

Youth career
- GVO
- Zilvermeeuwen

Senior career*
Years	Team	Apps	(Gls)
1990–1992	AZ	25	(2)
1992–1993	Telstar	32	(5)
1993–1994	VVV	24	(0)
1994–1995	Utrecht	9	(0)
1995–2000	Haarlem	148	(30)
2001–2004	Marken	23	(12)
2004–2005	Voorland		
- * Club domestic league appearances and goals

Carlos Hasselbaink (born 13 December 1968) is a Dutch retired footballer who played as a striker for several clubs, including AZ, Telstar, VVV, Utrecht and Haarlem, before retiring in 2005. In summer 2000 he had a trial at English side Norwich City.

== Personal life ==
A lighning-fast winger, he is the older brother of former Chelsea and Middlesbrough striker Jimmy Floyd Hasselbaink.
