= Vasil Bozhikov =

Bulgarian international footballer

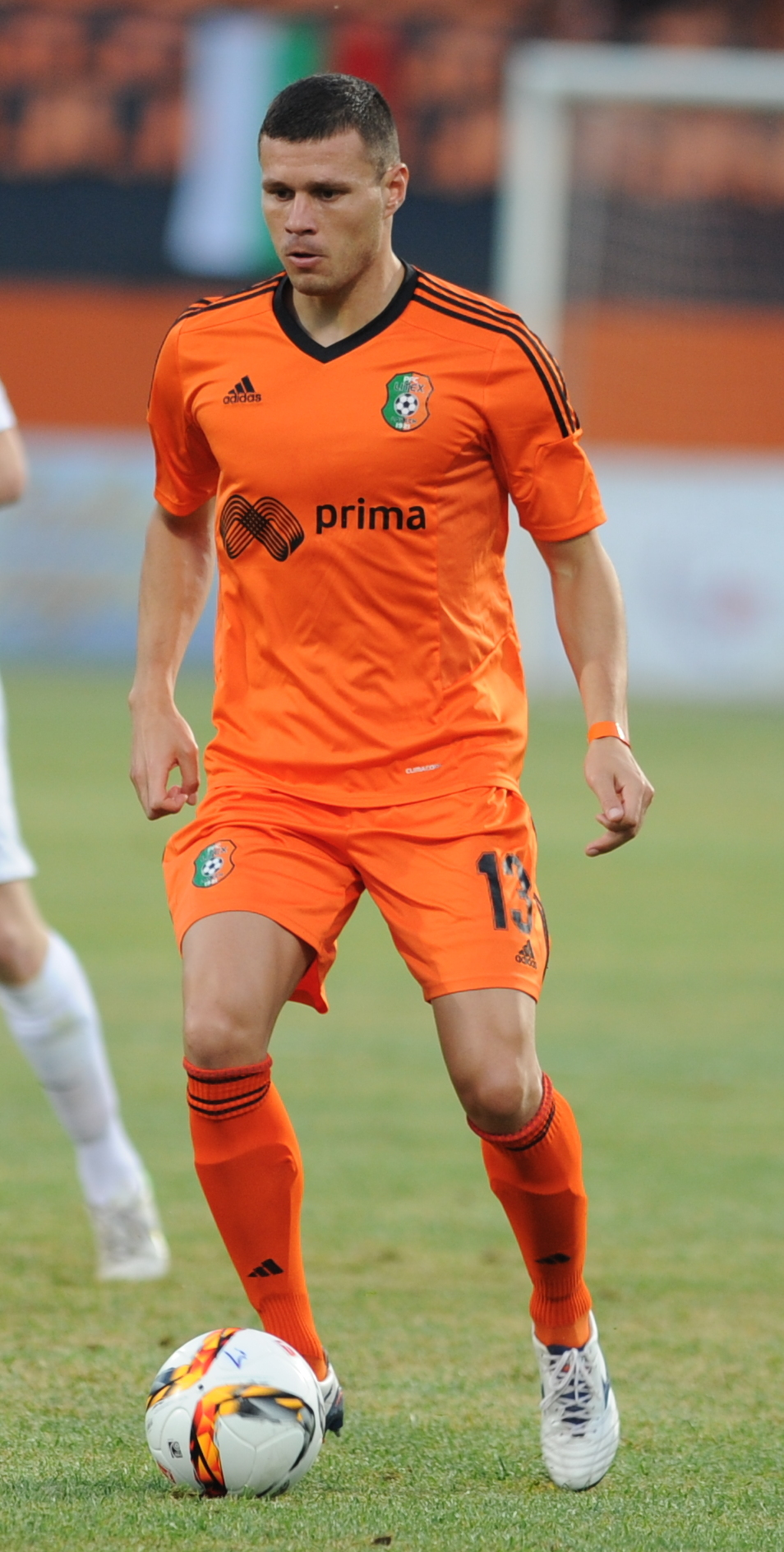
- Bozhikov with Litex Lovech in 2015

Personal information
- Full name: Vasil Georgiev Bozhikov
- Date of birth: 2 June 1988 (age 38)
- Place of birth: Gotse Delchev, Bulgaria
- Height: 1.85 m (6 ft 1 in)
- Position: Defender

Team information
- Current team: CSKA Sofia (youth coach)

Youth career
- 1996–1997: Pirin Gotse Delchev
- 1997–2002: Botev Plovdiv
- 2002–2006: Botev 2002

Senior career*
Years	Team	Apps	(Gls)
2006–2008	Gigant Saedinenie	67	(3)
2009–2011	Minyor Pernik	70	(0)
2012–2015	Litex Lovech	91	(1)
2015–2017	Kasımpaşa	23	(0)
2017–2022	Slovan Bratislava	110	(3)
Total		361	(7)

International career^{‡}
2009	Bulgaria U21	6	(0)
2016–2022	Bulgaria	38	(2)
- * Club domestic league appearances and goals as of 21:39, 28 May 2022 (UTC) ‡ National team caps and goals as of 26 March 2022

Vasil Georgiev Bozhikov (Bulgarian: Васил Георгиев Божиков; born 2 June 1988) is a Bulgarian retired professional footballer who captained his latest club - Fortuna Liga club Slovan Bratislava and played for the Bulgarian national team. He usually played as a centre back.

Bozhikov began his senior career with Third League club Gigant Saedinenie, spending two and a half seasons before signed his first professional contract with First League club Minyor Pernik in February 2009. After three years with Minyor, he joined Litex Lovech in January 2012. Bozhikov made over 100 appearances for Litex and signed for Turkish Süper Lig club Kasımpaşa in July 2015. After two seasons with Kasımpaşa, he signed for Slovan Bratislava on a free transfer in July 2017.

In 2016, Bozhikov won his first cap for Bulgaria, having previously played for the under-21 team. Since his senior international debut, he has made over 20 appearances for the national team.

== Career ==
=== Early career ===
Bozhikov was born in Gotse Delchev. He began playing football with hometown club Pirin Gotse Delchev, where he spent one year. Then he played youth football with Botev Plovdiv and Botev 2002.

In 2006, Bozhikov joined Gigant Saedinenie, where he made his senior debut in the Third League. For two-and-a-half seasons he made over 80 appearances for Gigant.

=== Minyor Pernik ===
In February 2009, Bozhikov signed professional contract with First League side Minyor Pernik after a successful trial period. He made his league debut on 16 March 2009 in a 0–0 home draw against Litex Lovech. At the end of July 2011, Bozhikov spent a week on trial with Belgian side Genk, playing in a pre-season match against Bayer 04 Leverkusen, but he did not sign for Genk. During his spell at Pernik, Bozhikov made a total of 70 league appearances for the club.

=== Litex Lovech ===
On 1 December 2011, it was announced that Litex Lovech had agreed a deal with Minyor to sign Bozhikov; Minyor announced that the contract would begin on 1 January 2012. Bozhikov was given the number 4 shirt and signed a three-year contract. He made his debut on 22 April 2012 in a 1–1 away draw against Ludogorets Razgrad, playing the full 90 minutes.

Bozhikov became a regular in the team during a 2012–13 season, making 26 league starts. In the 2013–14 season, he scored his first goal for Litex in a 2–1 away win over Sozopol in the Bulgarian Cup on 6 November 2013.

In January 2015, Bozhikov signed a new contract with Litex, keeping him at the club until 2018. On 2 July 2015, he scored his first-ever European goal in a 1–1 away draw against FK Jelgava in the first qualifying round of 2015–16 UEFA Europa League.

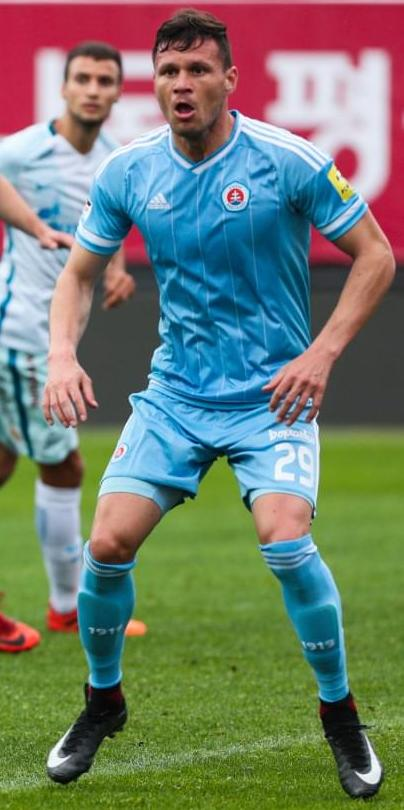
Bozhikov with Slovan in 2018

=== Kasımpaşa ===
Bozhikov signed with Turkish side Kasımpaşa on 15 July 2015 on a 2+1-year deal for a reported fee of €400,000. He made his debut for the club on 23 September against Tire 1922 in the Turkish Cup, playing the full 90 minutes. He played his first Süper Lig game on 28 September, coming on as a first-half substitute for Kenneth Omeruo in a 1–1 home draw against Rizespor. On 4 October, Bozhikov made his first league start in Kasımpaşa's fixture away at Antalyaspor.

=== Slovan Bratislava ===
On 30 July 2017, Bozhikov signed for Slovak Super Liga club Slovan Bratislava on a three-year contract. He was given the number 29 shirt. He made his debut on 13 August, in a 1–1 home draw against DAC Dunajská Streda. On 1 May 2018, Bozhikov scored his first goal for Slovan in a 3–1 home win over Ružomberok in the Slovak Cup. He scored his first league goal against DAC at MOL Aréna on 12 May 2018, a goal which proved to be the winner.

Following the departure of Boris Sekulić in June 2018, Bozhikov was made captain of Slovan. On 29 July 2018, he scored his first goal of the 2018–19 season in a 3–0 win against Podbrezová. On 9 August, he scored his second goal of the season in a 2–1 win over Rapid Wien in the third qualifying round of 2018–19 UEFA Europa League.

== International career ==
In February 2014, Bozhikov was named in the senior Bulgarian squad for the first time, ahead of a friendly against Belarus in March, but did not feature.

In March 2016, he was called up for friendly matches against Portugal and against Macedonia, and made his senior debut as a substitute on 26 March, in a 1–0 away win over Portugal, replacing Strahil Popov in the 88th minute. On 29 March, Bozhikov made his first start for Bulgaria in a friendly against Macedonia at Philip II Arena.

Bozhikov scored his first goal for Bulgaria on 25 March 2019, when he headed from a corner kick in a 1–1 draw against Kosovo in a UEFA Euro 2020 qualifying match.

== Career statistics ==
=== Club ===
As of 20 November 2019

Club	Season	League			Cup		Europe		Total	
Club	Season	Division	Apps	Goals	Apps	Goals	Apps	Goals	Apps	Goals
Minyor Pernik	2008–09	A Group	14	0	1	0	—		15	0
Minyor Pernik	2009–10	A Group	23	0	3	0	—		26	0
Minyor Pernik	2010–11	A Group	22	0	2	0	—		24	0
Minyor Pernik	2011–12	A Group	11	0	0	0	—		11	0
Minyor Pernik	Total		70	0	6	0	0	0	76	0
Litex Lovech	2011–12	A Group	4	0	0	0	—		4	0
Litex Lovech	2012–13	A Group	27	0	2	0	—		29	0
Litex Lovech	2013–14	A Group	34	0	6	1	—		40	1
Litex Lovech	2014–15	A Group	26	1	4	1	4	0	34	2
Litex Lovech	2015–16	A Group	0	0	0	0	2	1	2	1
Litex Lovech	Total		91	1	12	2	6	1	109	4
Kasımpaşa	2015–16	Süper Lig	14	0	2	0	—		16	0
Kasımpaşa	2016–17	Süper Lig	9	0	7	0	—		16	0
Kasımpaşa	Total		23	0	9	0	0	0	32	0
Slovan Bratislava	2017–18	Slovak Super Liga	27	1	5	1	0	0	32	2
Slovan Bratislava	2018–19	Slovak Super Liga	24	1	0	0	6	1	30	2
Slovan Bratislava	2019–20	Slovak Super Liga	9	0	0	0	11	0	20	0
Slovan Bratislava	Total		60	2	5	1	17	1	82	4
Career total			244	3	32	3	23	2	299	8

=== National team ===
As of match played 26 March 2022

Bulgaria
Year	Apps	Goals
2016	5	0
2017	7	0
2018	7	0
2019	7	2
2020	4	0
2021	7	0
2022	1	0
Total	38	2

=== International goals ===
Scores and results list Bulgaria's goal tally first.

No	Date	Venue	Opponent	Score	Result	Competition
1.	25 March 2019	Fadil Vokrri, Pristina, Kosovo	Kosovo	1–0	1–1	UEFA Euro 2020 qualification
2.	17 November 2019	Vasil Levski National Stadium, Sofia, Bulgaria	Czech Republic	1–0	1–0	UEFA Euro 2020 qualification

== Honours ==
Slovan Bratislava

- Fortuna Liga (4): 2018–19, 2019–20, 2020–21, 2021–22
- Slovnaft Cup (3): 2017–18, 2019–20, 2020–21

Individual

- Bulgarian Footballer of the Year Third place: 2019
- Slovak Super Liga Team of the Season: 2019-20, 2020-21
