= Ger van Mourik =

Dutch footballer (1931–2017)

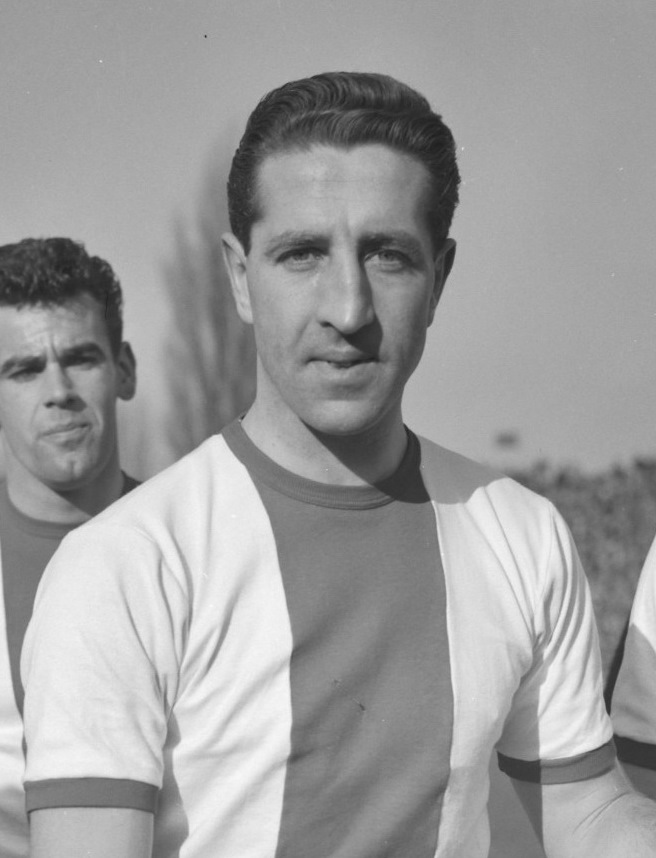
- van Mourik in 1960

Personal information
- Full name: Gerrit van Mourik
- Date of birth: 4 August 1931
- Place of birth: Amsterdam, Netherlands
- Date of death: 19 January 2017 (aged 85)
- Place of death: Netherlands
- Position: Defender

Youth career
- AVSK
- 1943–1945: Ajax

Senior career*
Years	Team	Apps	(Gls)
1950–1963	Ajax	277	(1)
- * Club domestic league appearances and goals

Ger van Mourik (4 August 1931 – 19 January 2017) was a Dutch footballer who played as a rightback.

== Club career ==
Born in Amsterdam, van Mourik played his entire career for hometown club Ajax, making his debut on 3 June 1950 against Enschedese Boys. With the club he won the 1962 Intertoto Cup and two league titles, in 1957 and 1960.

He was Ajax' captain for eight years and played 277 matches for the club, scoring 1 goal. He totalled 352 matches in all matches, ranking 11th in the club's Club van 100. He played his final game for Ajax on 30 June 1963 and was an Ajax club-member for over 70 years.

Van Mourik never played for the Dutch national team.

== Managerial career ==
Van Mourik managed DWV from 1974 until 1982, leading the club to the Dutch amateur title in 1977. He also coached SV Marken.
