= 2018–19 Slovak First Football League =

26th season of first-tier football league in Slovakia

Fortuna Liga
- Season: 2018–19
- Dates: 21 July 2018 – 24 May 2019
- Champions: Slovan Bratislava
- Relegated: Železiarne Podbrezová
- Champions League: Slovan Bratislava
- Europa League: DAC Dunajská Streda; Spartak Trnava; MFK Ružomberok
- Matches: 195
- Goals: 552 (2.83 per match)
- Top goalscorer: Andraž Šporar (29 goals)
- Biggest home win: Slovan 6–0 Michalovce (3 November 2018)
- Biggest away win: Sereď 0–5 D.Streda (13 April 2019)
- Highest scoring: Slovan 6–2 Žilina (11 May 2019)
- Highest attendance: 22,500 (Slovan-Trnava)
- Lowest attendance: 200 (Sereď-Žilina)
- Average attendance: ▲2400
- All statistics correct as of 25 May 2019.

The 2018–19 Slovak First Football League (known as the Fortuna Liga for sponsorship reasons) was the 26th season of first-tier football league in Slovakia since its establishment in 1993.

Spartak Trnava were the defending champions after winning their first Slovak title in the previous season. Slovan Bratislava won their first title since 2014 and their record-extending ninth Slovak league title overall.

== Teams ==
12 teams competed in the league – the top 11 sides from the 2017–18 season and one promoted team from the 2. liga. The promoted team was Sereď. They replaced Tatran Prešov.

- FC Spartak Trnava
- ŠK Slovan Bratislava
- FC DAC 1904 Dunajská Streda
- MŠK Žilina
- AS Trenčín
- MFK Ružomberok
- FC Nitra
- MFK Zemplín Michalovce
- ŽP Šport Podbrezová
- FC ViOn Zlaté Moravce
- FK Senica
- ŠKF iClinic Sereď

=== Stadiums and locations ===
Location of teams in Fortuna Liga 2018–19

Team	Home city	Stadium	Capacity	2017–18 season
AS Trenčín	Trenčín	Stadium Myjava	2,709	5th in Fortuna Liga
DAC Dunajská Streda	Dunajská Streda	MOL Aréna	12,700	3rd in Fortuna Liga
FK Železiarne Podbrezová	Podbrezová	ZELPO Aréna	4,061	9th in Fortuna Liga
FK Senica	Senica	OMS Arena	5,070	11th in Fortuna Liga
Michalovce	Michalovce	Mestský futbalový štadión	4,440	8th in Fortuna Liga
MFK Ružomberok	Ružomberok	Štadión pod Čebraťom	4,817	6th in Fortuna Liga
FC Nitra	Nitra	Štadión pod Zoborom	7,480	7th in Fortuna Liga
ŠKF Sereď	Sereď	Štadión pod Zoborom	7,480	2. Liga Champion
MŠK Žilina	Žilina	Štadión pod Dubňom	11,258	4th in Fortuna Liga
Slovan Bratislava	Bratislava	Tehelné pole	22,500	2nd in Fortuna Liga
Spartak Trnava	Trnava	Anton Malatinský Stadium	19,200	Champions
ViOn Zlaté Moravce	Zlaté Moravce	FC ViOn Stadium	4,000	10th in Fortuna Liga

AS Trenčín	Dunajská Streda	Podbrezová	Michalovce
Stadium Myjava	MOL Aréna; UEFA	ZELPO Aréna	Mestský futbalový štadión
Capacity: 2,709	Capacity: 12,700	Capacity: 4,061	Capacity: 4,440
FK Senica	MFK Ružomberok	MŠK Žilina	Slovan Bratislava
OMS Arena; UEFA	Štadión pod Čebraťom	Štadión pod Dubňom; UEFA	Tehelné pole UEFA
Capacity: 4,500	Capacity: 4,817	Capacity: 11,258	Capacity: 22,500
Spartak Trnava	ŠKF Sereď	ViOn Zlaté Moravce	FC Nitra
Anton Malatinský Stadium; UEFA	Štadión pod Zoborom; UEFA	Štadión FC ViOn	Štadión pod Zoborom; UEFA
Capacity: 19,200	Capacity: 7,480	Capacity: 4,000	Capacity: 7,480

== Personnel and kits ==
Team	President	Manager	Captain	Kitmaker	Shirt sponsor
AS Trenčín	(Slovakia) Jozef Liptovský	(Slovakia) Ivan Galád	(Slovakia) Peter Kleščík	(Germany) Adidas	ORION Tip
DAC Dunajská Streda	(Slovakia) Oszkár Világi	(Germany) Peter Hyballa	(Slovakia) Tomáš Huk	(Italy) macron	Kukkonia
FK Železiarne Podbrezová	(Slovakia) Július Kriváň	(Slovakia) Vladimír Veselý	(Slovakia) Miroslav Viazanko	(Germany) Adidas	Železiarne Podbrezová
FK Senica	(Slovakia) Vladimír Levársky	(Portugal) Ricardo Chéu	(Slovakia) Erik Otrísal	(Denmark) hummel	-
MFK Ružomberok	(Slovakia) Milan Fiľo	(Czech Republic) David Holoubek	(Slovakia) Dominik Kružliak	(Germany) Adidas	MAESTRO
MŠK Žilina	(Slovakia) Jozef Antošík	(Slovakia) Jaroslav Kentoš	(Slovakia) Michal Škvarka	(United States) Nike	Preto
Slovan Bratislava	(Slovakia) Ivan Kmotrík	(Slovakia) Martin Ševela	(Bulgaria) Vasil Bozhikov	(Germany) Adidas	grafobal
FC Nitra	(Slovakia) Jozef Petráni	(Slovakia) Michal Kuruc	(Slovakia) Miloš Šimončič	(Germany) Jako	-
Spartak Trnava	(Slovakia) Dušan Keketi	(Czech Republic) Michal Ščasný	(Slovakia) Erik Grendel	(Germany) Adidas	PN Invest
ViOn Zlaté Moravce	(Slovakia) Karol Škula	(Slovakia) Karol Praženica	(Slovakia) Martin Chren	(Italy) Erreà	ViOn
MFK Michalovce	(Slovakia) Ján Sabol	(Slovakia) Anton Šoltis	(Slovakia) Igor Žofčák	(Germany) Adidas	ISDB, St. Nicolaus
ŠKF Sereď	(Slovakia) Róbert Stareček	(Czech Republic) Karel Stromšík	(Slovakia) Martin Mečiar	(United States) Nike	iClinic

=== Managerial changes ===
Team	Outgoing manager	Manner of departure	Date of vacancy	Position in table	Replaced by	Date of appointment
Spartak Trnava	(England) Nestor El Maestro	End of contract	21 May 2018	Pre-season	(Czech Republic) Radoslav Látal	8 June 2018
MŠK Žilina	(Slovakia) Adrián Guľa	Signed with Slovakia U21	28 May 2018	Pre-season	(Slovakia) Jaroslav Kentoš	28 May 2018
MFK Ružomberok	(Slovakia) Norbert Hrnčár	End of contract	28 May 2018	Pre-season	(Czech Republic) David Holoubek	4 June 2018
AS Trenčín	(Slovakia) Vladimír Cifranič	Become assistant	2 June 2018	Pre-season	(Netherlands) Ricardo Moniz	2 June 2018
Dunajská Streda	(Italy) Marco Rossi	Signed with Hungary	20 June 2018	Pre-season	(Germany) Peter Hyballa	16 July 2018
FK Senica	(Netherlands) Ton Caanen	Become general manager	3 August 2018	10	(Portugal) Frederico Ricardo	3 August 2018
ŠKF Sereď	(Slovakia) Michal Gašparík	Sacked	4 September 2018	8	(Czech Republic) Karel Stromšík	4 September 2018
AS Trenčín	(Netherlands) Ricardo Moniz	Resigned	28 October 2018	6	(Slovakia) Vladimír Cifranič (carateker)	28 October 2018
FC ViOn Zlaté Moravce	(Slovakia) Juraj Jarábek	Resigned	5 November 2018	12	(Slovakia) Branislav Mráz (carateker)	5 November 2018
FK Železiarne Podbrezová	(Slovakia) Marek Fabuľa	Sacked	27 November 2018	11	(Slovakia) Gergely Geri (carateker)	27 November 2018
FC Spartak Trnava	(Czech Republic) Radoslav Látal	Resigned	13 December 2018	8	(Czech Republic) Michal Ščasný	22 December 2018
FC ViOn Zlaté Moravce	(Slovakia) Branislav Mráz	End of interim spell	13 December 2018	12	(Slovakia) Karol Praženica	13 December 2018
FK Železiarne Podbrezová	(Slovakia) Gergely Geri	End of interim spell	4 January 2019	10	(Slovakia) Vladimír Veselý	4 January 2019
FK Senica	(Portugal) Frederico Ricardo	Released	9 January 2019	11	(Portugal) Ricardo Chéu	9 January 2019
FC Nitra	(Slovakia) Ivan Galád	Released	13 March 2019	8	(Slovakia) Michal Kuruc	13 March 2019
AS Trenčín	(Slovakia) Vladimír Cifranič	End by own request	20 March 2019	9	(Germany) Matthias Kohler	20 March 2019
AS Trenčín	(Germany) Matthias Kohler	Released	7 May 2019	11	(Slovakia) Ivan Galád	7 May 2019

== Regular stage ==
=== League table ===
Pos	Team	Pld	W	D	L	GF	GA	GD	Pts	Qualification
1	Slovan Bratislava	22	18	4	0	53	18	+35	58	Qualification for the championship group
2	Žilina	22	13	5	4	39	23	+16	44	Qualification for the championship group
3	DAC Dunajská Streda	22	13	5	4	42	27	+15	44	Qualification for the championship group
4	Ružomberok	22	9	9	4	34	20	+14	36	Qualification for the championship group
5	Zemplín Michalovce	22	9	5	8	29	33	−4	32	Qualification for the championship group
6	Sereď	22	9	4	9	27	29	−2	31	Qualification for the championship group
7	Nitra	22	7	5	10	27	30	−3	26	Qualification for the relegation group
8	Spartak Trnava	22	7	4	11	28	28	0	25	Qualification for the relegation group
9	Trenčín	22	6	4	12	30	40	−10	22	Qualification for the relegation group
10	Železiarne Podbrezová	22	6	3	13	22	35	−13	21	Qualification for the relegation group
11	Senica	22	3	6	13	20	43	−23	15	Qualification for the relegation group
12	ViOn Zlaté Moravce	22	4	2	16	19	44	−25	14	Qualification for the relegation group

Source: Niké liga (in Slovak)
Rules for classification: 1) Points; 2) Head-to-head points; 3) Head-to-head goal difference; 4) Head-to-head away goals scored; 5) Play-off.

=== Results ===
Each team plays home-and-away against every other team in the league, for a total of 22 matches played each.

Home \ Away	DAC	NIT	POD	RUŽ	SEN	SER	SLO	TRV	TRČ	ZTM	ZPM	ŽIL
DAC Dunajská Streda	—	1–0	3–2	2–2	1–0	5–0	0–1	3–2	0–0	3–1	4–1	0–0
Nitra	2–3	—	1–3	0–0	1–0	0–2	1–2	0–0	2–1	4–1	2–1	0–2
Podbrezová	1–2	3–2	—	0–1	2–4	1–1	0–2	1–0	2–0	3–0	0–1	0–2
Ružomberok	0–1	3–1	3–0	—	4–0	0–0	0–2	3–1	1–0	4–0	0–0	3–1
Senica	1–2	1–1	1–1	1–1	—	0–0	1–2	1–0	0–2	3–0	2–4	0–1
Sereď	0–1	2–1	1–2	3–1	2–1	—	0–1	3–1	3–1	2–0	2–1	1–1
Slovan Bratislava	3–2	1–1	3–0	1–1	2–2	2–1	—	2–0	3–3	3–1	6–0	5–2
Spartak Trnava	3–1	2–3	2–0	0–0	4–1	2–1	1–2	—	3–1	1–0	3–0	1–2
Trenčín	3–3	0–1	1–1	1–4	3–0	5–1	0–3	1–0	—	1–0	1–2	0–2
ViOn Zlaté Moravce	1–2	0–3	1–0	1–1	4–0	0–1	1–4	1–1	3–1	—	2–0	1–2
Zemplín Michalovce	2–1	0–0	2–0	2–2	1–1	1–0	1–2	1–0	4–2	3–0	—	0–1
Žilina	2–2	2–1	2–0	3–0	5–0	2–1	0–1	1–1	2–3	2–1	2–2	—

Source: Niké liga (in Slovak)
Legend: Blue = home team win; Yellow = draw; Red = away team win.
For upcoming matches, an "a" indicates there is an article about the rivalry between the two participants.

== Championship group ==
Pos	Team	Pld	W	D	L	GF	GA	GD	Pts	Qualification	SLO	DAC	RUŽ	ŽIL	ZMI	SER
1	Slovan Bratislava (C)	32	25	5	2	84	33	+51	80	Qualification for the Champions League first qualifying round	—	3–1	3–2	6–2	4–1	3–1
2	DAC Dunajská Streda	32	19	6	7	63	37	+26	63	Qualification for the Europa League first qualifying round	1–0	—	1–1	1–0	5–0	3–4
3	Ružomberok	32	15	11	6	50	31	+19	56	Qualification for the Europa League first qualifying round	3–2	1–0	—	1–1	1–0	1–0
4	Žilina	32	16	6	10	56	44	+12	54		0–3	1–2	4–2	—	4–0	1–2
5	Zemplín Michalovce	32	11	7	14	39	58	−19	40		3–3	0–2	0–3	2–1	—	2–0
6	Sereď	32	11	5	16	39	54	−15	38		1–4	0–5	0–1	2–3	2–2	—

Source: Niké liga (in Slovak)
Legend: Blue = home team win; Yellow = draw; Red = away team win.
Rules for classification: 1) Points; 2) Head-to-head points; 3) Head-to-head goal difference; 4) Head-to-head away goals scored; 5) Play-off.
(C) Champions

== Relegation group ==
Pos	Team	Pld	W	D	L	GF	GA	GD	Pts	Qualification or relegation	TRN	SEN	NIT	ZLM	TRE	POD
7	Spartak Trnava (Q)	32	10	8	14	35	35	0	38	Qualification for the Europa League first qualifying round (Note: Spartak Trnava qualified for the Europa League first qualifying round by winning the 2018-19 Slovak Cup)	—	0–1	1–1	0–1	0–0	3–1
8	Senica	32	10	7	15	42	53	−11	37		2–0	—	4–1	3–1	4–0	0–0
9	Nitra	32	8	10	14	42	48	−6	34		0–1	2–3	—	2–2	2–2	2–2
10	ViOn Zlaté Moravce	32	10	4	18	33	55	−22	34		1–1	3–2	1–0	—	2–1	2–1
11	Trenčín (O)	32	8	7	17	41	56	−15	31	Qualification for the relegation play-offs	0–1	2–3	1–4	1–0	—	4–0
12	Železiarne Podbrezová (R)	32	7	8	17	28	48	−20	29	Relegation to the 2. Liga	0–0	1–0	1–1	0–1	0–0	—

Source: Niké liga (in Slovak)
Legend: Blue = home team win; Yellow = draw; Red = away team win.
Rules for classification: 1) Points; 2) Head-to-head points; 3) Head-to-head goal difference; 4) Head-to-head away goals scored; 5) Play-off.
(O) Play-off winners; (Q) Qualified for the phase indicated; (R) Relegated

== Europa League play-offs ==
Should one of the top 3 teams have won the 2018–19 Slovak Cup, Europa League qualification playoffs would have been held among the 4th, 5th, 6th team in the championship group and the top team of the relegation round. The 4th team played the top team of the relegation group and the 5th played the 6th in the semifinals. Winners of the semifinals would play the final to determine the Europa League qualification spot. Europa League qualification playoff games would be one-leg and played at the home pitch of the higher-ranked team. The winners would qualify for the first qualifying round of the 2019–20 UEFA Europa League. On 1 May 2019, Spartak Trnava, who didn't qualify for the championship group, won the cup, thus eliminating the need of playoffs.

== Relegation play-offs ==
Team placed 11th in the relegation match faced 2nd team from 2. Liga 2018–19 for one spot in the next season.

All times are CEST (UTC+2).

=== First leg ===
28 May 2019
19:00

FK Poprad	2–0	AS Trenčín
Pajer 10'; Šesták 58'	Report

NTC Poprad, Poprad
Attendance: 2,310
Referee: Michal Očenáš

=== Second leg ===
1 June 2019
17:00

AS Trenčín	4–1	FK Poprad
Sleegers 11'; Šulek 26'; Roguljić 78'; Corryn 81'	Report	Horváth 28'

Štadión pod Dubňom, Žilina
Attendance: 988
Referee: Jozef Pavlík

4–3 on aggregate.

== Season statistics ==
=== Top goalscorers ===
As of 25 May 2019

Rank	Player	Club	Goals
1	(Slovenia) Andraž Šporar	ŠK Slovan	29
2	(Slovakia) Róbert Boženík	Žilina	13
3	(Morocco) Moha	Slovan	12
3	(Bosnia and Herzegovina) Hamza Čataković	AS Trenčín	12
5	(Hungary) Kristopher Vida	DAC D.Streda	11
6	(Ivory Coast) Vakoun Issouf Bayo	DAC D.Streda	10
6	(Slovakia) Tomáš Vestenický	Nitra	10
8	(Bosnia and Herzegovina) Izzy Tandir	Ružomberok	9
8	(Slovakia) Michal Škvarka	Žilina	9
8	(Austria) Kubilay Yilmaz	Trnava	9
8	(Slovakia) Tomáš Ďubek	Z.Moravce	9
8	(Albania) Kristi Qose	Ružomberok	9
8	(Netherlands) Joey Sleegers ^{a}	Trenčín	9

^{a} Included 1 play-off goal

=== Hat-tricks ===
Round	Player	For	Against	Result	Date	Ref
7	(Slovakia) Tomáš Vestenický	FC Nitra	ViOn Zlaté Moravce	4–1	1 September 2018	
18	(Slovakia) Andrej Fábry	FC Nitra	ViOn Zlaté Moravce	0–3	8 December 2018	
8.CH	(Slovenia) Andraž Šporar	Slovan	Žilina	6–2	11 May 2019	

=== Clean sheets ===
As of 25 May 2019

Rank	Player	Club	Clean sheets
1	(Slovakia) Matúš Macík	Ružomberok	13
2	(Czech Republic) Martin Jedlička	D.Streda	12
3	(Slovakia) Dominik Holec	Žilina	9
3	(Slovakia) Dominik Greif	Slovan	9
5	(Slovakia) Matúš Kira	Michalovce	8
6	(Argentina) Federico Taborda	Senica	7
7	(Slovakia) Igor Šemrinec	Trenčín	5
8	(Slovakia) Lukáš Hroššo	Nitra	4
8	(Slovakia) Pavol Penksa	Sereď	4
8	(Slovakia) Dobrivoj Rusov	Trnava	4
8	(Slovakia) Martin Vantruba	Podbrezová	4
8	(Slovakia) Adrián Chovan	Z.Moravce	4

=== Discipline ===
As of 25 May 2019

==== Player ====
- Most yellow cards: 13
  - (Slovakia) Ľubomír Michalík (Sereď)
- Most red cards: 2
  - (Cameroon) Macdonald Ngwa Niba (Nitra)
  - (North Macedonia) Yani Urdinov (Ruzomberok)
  - (Argentina) Ivan Diaz (Žilina)
  - (Slovakia) Erik Grendel (Trnava)

==== Club ====
- Most yellow cards: 87
  - ŠKF Sereď
- Most red cards: 5
  - AS Trenčín

== Awards ==
=== Player of the Month ===
Month	Player	Club	Ref
July/August	(Slovakia) Erik Pačinda	Dunajská Streda	
September	(Slovakia) Tomáš Vestenický	FC Nitra	
October	(Slovakia) Róbert Boženík	MŠK Žilina	
November/December	(Slovenia) Andraž Šporar	Slovan Bratislava	
February/March	(Slovakia) Matúš Kira	Michalovce	
April	(Czech Republic) Martin Jedlička	Dunajská Streda	
May	(Slovenia) Andraž Šporar	Slovan Bratislava	

=== Top Eleven ===
- Goalkeeper: (Slovakia) Dominik Greif (ŠK Slovan)
- Defence: (Panama) Erick Davis (DAC D.Streda), (Slovakia) Kristián Koštrna (DAC D.Streda), (Slovakia) Dominik Kružliak (Ružomberok), (Bulgaria) Vasil Bozhikov (ŠK Slovan)
- Midfield: (Slovakia) Miroslav Káčer (Žilina), (Croatia) Marin Ljubičić (DAC D.Streda/Slovan), (Hungary) Zsolt Kalmár (DAC D.Streda), (Serbia) Aleksandar Čavrić (ŠK Slovan), (Morocco) Moha (ŠK Slovan)
- Attack: (Slovenia) Andraž Šporar (ŠK Slovan)

=== Top Eleven U-21 ===
- Goalkeeper: (Slovakia) Dominik Greif (ŠK Slovan)
- Defence: (Greece) Lazarus Rota (Michalovce), (Slovakia) Dominik Kružliak (Ružomberok), (Slovakia) Matej Oravec (Trnava/Podbrezová), (Slovakia) Branislav Sluka (MŠK Žilina)
- Midfield: (North Macedonia) Tihomir Kostadinov (Ružomberok), (Slovakia) Miroslav Káčer (MŠK Žilina), (Hungary) Máté Vida (DAC D.Streda), (Slovakia) Christián Herc (DAC D.Streda)
- Attack: (Slovakia) Tomáš Vestenický (Nitra), (Slovakia) Róbert Boženík (MŠK Žilina)

=== Individual awards ===
Manager of the season

Martin Ševela (ŠK Slovan)

Player of the Year

Andraž Šporar (ŠK Slovan)

Young player of the Year

Róbert Boženík (MŠK Žilina)

== Attendances ==
#	Club	Average
1	DAC	8,445
2	Slovan	5,643
3	Trnava	3,476
4	Žilina	2,303
5	Nitra	1,654
6	ViOn	1,453
7	Ružomberok	1,431
8	Zemplín	1,370
9	Železiarne	990
10	Senica	757
11	Sereď	720
12	Trenčín	561

== See also ==
- 2018–19 Slovak Cup
- 2018–19 2. Liga (Slovakia)
- List of transfers summer 2018
- List of transfers winter 2018-19
- List of foreign players
