= Adam Laczkó =

Slovak footballer

Personal information
- Full name: Adam Laczkó
- Date of birth: 2 April 1997 (age 29)
- Place of birth: Bratislava, Slovakia
- Height: 1.88 m (6 ft 2 in)
- Position: Centre back

Youth career
- FK BCT Bratislava
- 2010–2014: Petržalka akadémia
- 2014–2015: Slovan Bratislava

Senior career*
Years	Team	Apps	(Gls)
2016–2022	Slovan Bratislava	13	(0)
2019	→ AS Trenčín (loan)	5	(0)
2022–2023	Líšeň	24	(1)

International career
- Slovakia U15
- Slovakia U18
2015–2016	Slovakia U19	4	(1)
- * Club domestic league appearances and goals as of 19 June 2023

Adam Laczkó (born 2 April 1997) is a Slovak footballer who most recently played for Czech club Líšeň as a centre back.

== Club career ==
Laczkó made his Fortuna Liga debut for Slovan Bratislava on 13 August 2016 against Ružomberok. He signed his first professional contract with the club in 2018 following good performances during the winter preparations. A year later, Laczkó joined fellow league outfit AS Trenčín on a loan. He debuted for the club in a 4–2 league loss against MFK Zemplín Michalovce in March 2019. In 2022, Laczkó transferred to Czech club SK Líšeň of the second-tier Czech National Football League.

== International career ==
Laczkó debuted for the Slovakia national under-19 football team in a match against Armenia.
