= Federico Taborda =

Argentine footballer

Personal information
- Date of birth: 1 November 1988 (age 38)
- Place of birth: Pergamino, Argentina
- Height: 1.84 m (6 ft 0 in)
- Position: Goalkeeper

Senior career*
Years	Team	Apps	(Gls)
2010–2011	Club Sportivo Ben Hur	0	(0)
2011–2012	Unión de Sunchales	0	(0)
2012–2013	Atlético Paraná	0	(0)
2013–2014	Defensores de Belgrano de Villa Ramallo	0	(0)
2014–2015	Tiro Federal	0	(0)
2015–2016	Sol de América	1	(0)
2016–2017	San Lorenzo de Alem	2	(0)
2017–2018	Civitanovese	0	(0)
2018–2019	Senica	37	(0)
2020–2021	FC U Craiova	1	(0)
- * Club domestic league appearances and goals as of 13:19, 14 June 2021 (UTC)

Federico Taborda (born 1 November 1988) is a professional Argentine footballer who currently plays as a goalkeeper.

== Club career ==
=== FK Senica ===
Taborda made his professional Fortuna Liga debut for Senica against Spartak Trnava on July 21, 2018, in a 1:0 home victory, after an own-goal by a member of broader Slovak national team, Matúš Čonka.

== Honours ==
FC U Craiova 1948

- Liga II: 2020–21
