= Dan Jambor =

Czech footballer

Personal information
- Full name: Dan Jambor
- Date of birth: 23 November 1999 (age 26)
- Place of birth: Brno, Czech Republic
- Height: 1.69 m (5 ft 7 in)
- Position: Midfielder

Team information
- Current team: HS Kroměříž
- Number: 10

Youth career
- 2006–2018: Zbrojovka Brno

Senior career*
Years	Team	Apps	(Gls)
2018–2020	Zbrojovka Brno	7	(0)
2019	→ Líšeň (loan)	10	(0)
2020–2023	MFK Vyškov	28	(2)
2022–2023	→ HS Kroměříž (loan)	33	(4)
2023–2024	Blansko	51	(8)
2025–	HS Kroměříž	13	(1)

International career
2014	Czech Republic U-16	2	(0)
- * Club domestic league appearances and goals as of 15 June 2025

Dan Jambor (born 23 November 1999) is a Czech footballer who currently plays as a midfielder for HS Kroměříž.

== Club career ==
=== FC Zbrojovka Brno ===
He made his professional debut for Zbrojovka Brno in the home match against Jihlava on 22 July 2018, which ended in a loss 1:3. On 22 August 2018 he scored his first goal for Zbrojovka in a second round of Czech Cup against Žďár nad Sázavou
