= Frederico Ricardo =

Portuguese football manager

Personal information
- Full name: Frederico Ricardo Cordeiro Rodrigues
- Date of birth: 18 February 1979 (age 47)
- Place of birth: Portugal

Managerial career
- Years: Team
- 2018-2019: FK Senica
- 2019: GD Bragança

Frederico Ricardo (born 18 February 1979) is a Portuguese football manager who last coached GD Bragança in his home country.

== Career ==
Ricardo started his managerial career with FK Senica in the Slovak Super Liga in 2018, a position he held until 2019. After that, he coached GD Bragança.
