= Kelly Zeeman =

Dutch footballer (born 1993)

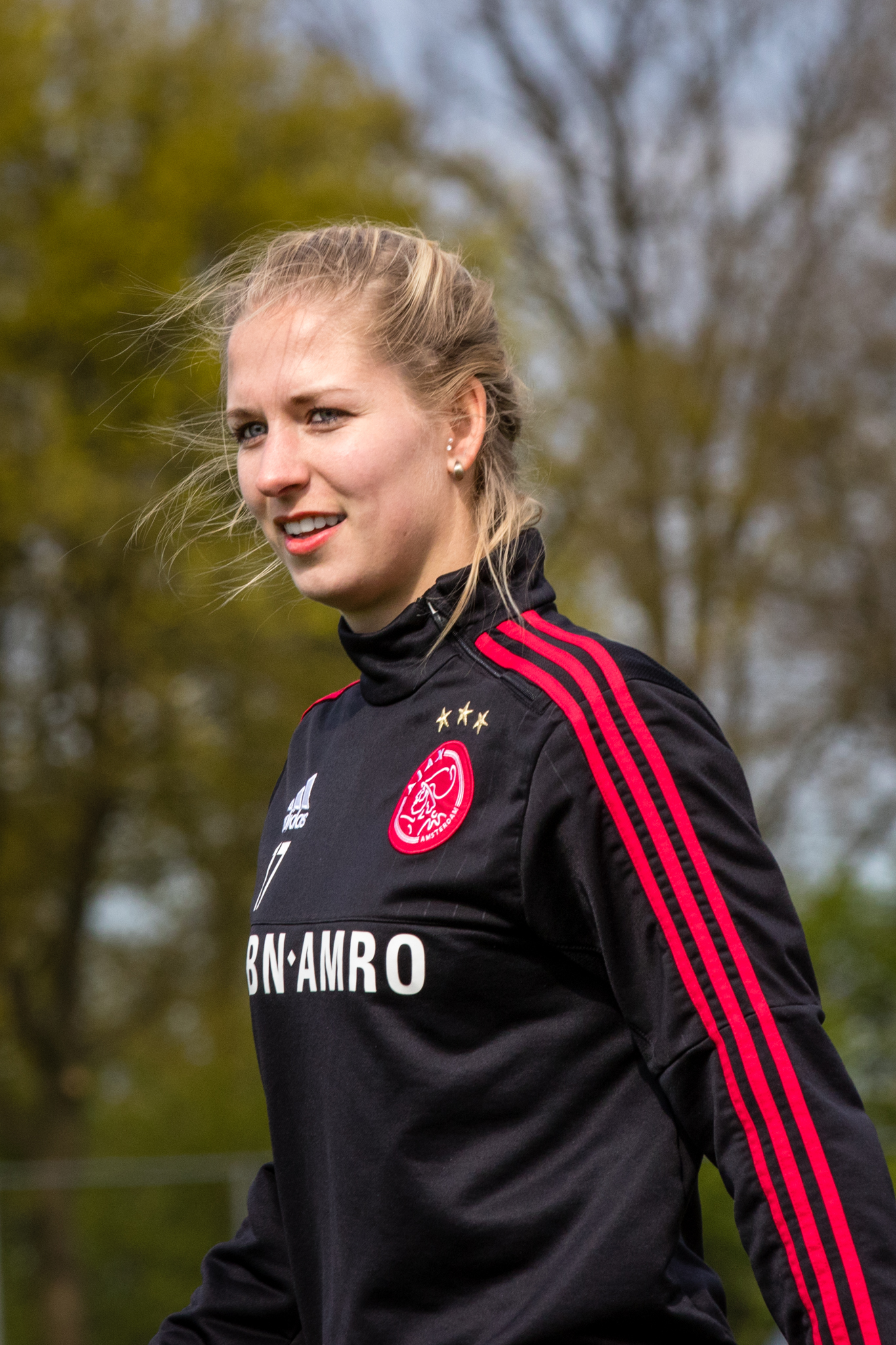
- Zeeman with Ajax in 2016

Personal information
- Date of birth: 19 November 1993 (age 32)
- Place of birth: Amsterdam, Netherlands
- Height: 1.81 m (5 ft 11 in)
- Positions: Defensive midfielder; centre-back

Youth career
- SV Marken

Senior career*
Years	Team	Apps	(Gls)
2012–2013	Telstar	21	(2)
2013–2022	Ajax	120	(19)
2021	→ SC Heerenveen (loan)	10	(0)
Total		151	(21)

International career
2009	Netherlands U16	3	(1)
2009–2010	Netherlands U17	8	(2)
2011	Netherlands U19	2	(0)
2013–2018	Netherlands	24	(0)
Medal record
Women's football
Representing the Netherlands
UEFA Women's Championship
Gold medal – first place	2017 Netherlands
- * Club domestic league appearances and goals

Kelly Zeeman (born 19 November 1993) is a Dutch former professional footballer who played as a defensive midfielder or centre-back.

Zeeman spent most of her career at Eredivisie club Ajax, and also played for the Netherlands national team, being part of the winning Netherlands team at UEFA Women's Euro 2017.

== Club career ==
Zeeman played for Telstar in the BeNe League in the 2012–13 season. In June 2013, she moved to Ajax along with Claudia van den Heiligenberg. She suffered a serious injury in 2019, and was out for a few months. On 2 June 2020, Zeeman signed a new two-year contract with the club.

In January 2021, Zeeman joined SC Heerenveen on a loan deal until 30 June 2021. This made her the first Dutch player to be loaned out in Eredivisie history.

On 5 May 2022, Zeeman announced she would be retiring from football at the end of the 2021–22 season. She played her final match in the Eredivise Cup final, playing 50 minutes before being substituted. Zeeman retired having won two championships, five KNVB Cups, and one Eredivise Cup.

== International career ==
Zeeman earned her first cap for the national team on 9 February 2013, in a 3–2 friendly win against Belgium.

In June 2017, she was called up by head coach Sarina Wiegman to be part of the Netherlands squad for the UEFA Women's Euro 2017 on home soil. Zeeman made two substitute appearances during the tournament, which the Dutch won to claim their first Women's Euro trophy.

After the tournament, the whole team was honoured by the Prime Minister Mark Rutte and Minister of Sport Edith Schippers and made Knights of the Order of Orange-Nassau.

== Post-playing career ==
Zeeman started working with the Ajax media team, interviewing current Ajax players in a series called "Kelly's Angels".

In May 2023, Zeeman was part of a two-year Ajax training program that aimed to associate former Ajax players with projects at Ajax.

== Career statistics ==
As of match played 2 March 2018

Appearances and goals by national team and year
National team	Year	Apps	Goals
Netherlands	2013	4	0
Netherlands	2016	7	0
Netherlands	2017	10	0
Netherlands	2018	3	0
Total		24	0

== Honours ==
Ajax

- Women's Eredivisie: 2016–17, 2017–18
- KNVB Women's Cup: 2013–14, 2016–17, 2017–18, 2018–19, 2021–22

Netherlands

- UEFA Women's Championship: 2017
- Algarve Cup: 2018

Individual

- Knight of the Order of Orange-Nassau: 2017
