= Patrick Asmah =

Ghanaian footballer

Personal information
- Full name: Patrick Kojo Asmah
- Date of birth: 25 January 1996 (age 30)
- Place of birth: Ghana
- Height: 1.72 m (5 ft 8 in)
- Position: Defender

Senior career*
| Years | Team | Apps | (Gls) |
| 2016–2019 | Atalanta | 0 | (0) |
| 2016–2017 | → Avellino (loan) | 16 | (0) |
| 2017 | → Salernitana (loan) | 0 | (0) |
| 2018–2019 | → Senica (loan) | 19 | (2) |

International career
| 2015 | Ghana | 1 | (0) |
- * Club domestic league appearances and goals as of 31 May 2019

Patrick Kojo Asmah (born 25 January 1996) is a Ghanaian footballer who plays as a defender.
