= SV Marken =

Dutch football club

- Full name: Sportvereniging Marken
- League: Tweede Klasse
colours

Sportvereniging Marken (Dutch for Sport Club Marken, commonly shortened to SV Marken, or just Marken) is an association football club from Marken, Netherlands. The football club was founded in 1946. It has as a Christian background, that was never included in its name. It plays in the 2017–18 Eerste Klasse Saturday after promoting in 2017.

Marken reached the quarterfinals of the KNVB Cup, where it lost 0–1 from FC Den Haag. Its best known player is Kelly Zeeman, a girl from Marken who played in SV Marken boys and men teams. She went on to win the EuroCup Women with the Netherlands women's national football team. Her father, Klaas Zeeman, had played in the match against FC Den Haag.

== History ==
=== 20th century ===
Founded in 1946, the club played in local leagues and the Vierde Klasse until 1966. It then had only run in the Derde Klasse that lasted until 1974 and ended with SV Marken's first section championship. The season after, ending in 1975, it achieved its second championship in the Tweede Klasse and made it for 2 years into the Eerste Klasse until relegation. The second run in the Tweede lasted considerably longer and ended with a 3rd championship in 1984.

In the 1985–86 KNVB Cup SV Marken created a sensation when it reached the quarterfinals, losing just 0–1 against the professional side FC Den Haag. No club but IJsselmeervogels had made it to it so far in National Cup before SV Marken. The home game for Marken was played in neighboring Volendam so sufficient football supporters could attend the game.

From 1984 to 2006 SV Marken spent most seasons in the Eerste Klasse with 3 year and 4 year runs in the Hoofdklasse in the late 1990s and early 2000s. During these years it achieved its best league result ever, 4th place in Hoofdklasse, in 1997 and secured an Eerste Klasse championship in 2001.

=== 21st century ===
Since 2006 the Marken play mostly Tweede Klasse with an interlude in the Eerste Klasse from 2010 to 2014. In 2017 Marken promoted through playoffs from a 7th position in the Tweede Klasse into the Eerste Klasse. Next season, it returned to the Tweede Klasse.

== Associated people ==
=== Chief coach ===
- 1958-1970: Jan Schilder
- 1970-1976: Gerrit Blotevogel
- 1976-1978: Jacob van der Vaart
- 1978-1980: Wim Verburg
- 1980-1983: Hennie Heerland
- 1983-1988: Dick Alberts
- 1988-1989: Frans Kramer
- 1989: Jan Schipper (interim)
- 1989-1990: Ger van Mourik
- 1990-1995: Peter de Waal
- 1995-2000: Rowdy Bakker
- 2000-2006: Bert van de Poppe
- 2006-2009: Tijs Schipper
- 2009-2011: Edwin Keizer
- 2011-2012: Saïd Ouaali
- 2012: Bram Berkhout (interim)
- 2012: Martin Boes (interim)
- 2012-2013: Charles Loots
- 2013-2017: Martin Boes
- 2017: Tijs Schipper
- 2018-2020: Ronald Dooijeweerd
- Since 2020: Ron van der Velde

=== Notable players ===
- Carlos Hasselbaink (2003–04)
- Kelly Zeeman (200?–12)

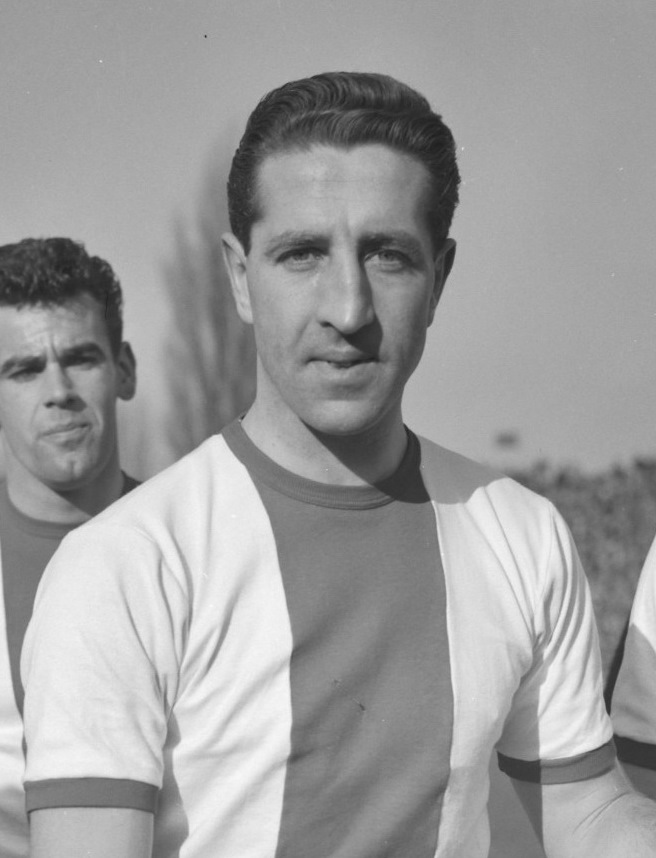
Coach Ger van Mourik in 1960. Before Marken.

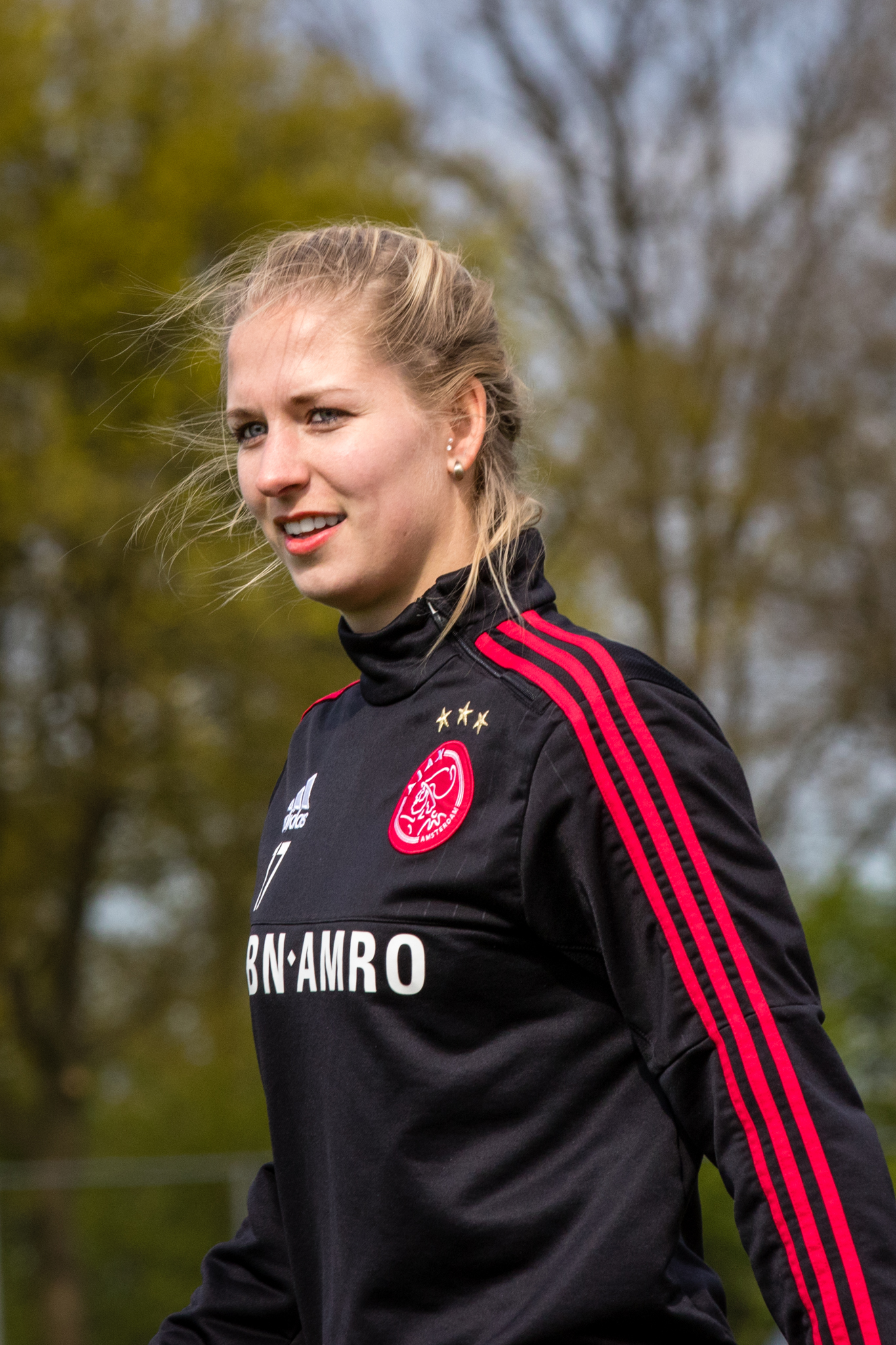
Player Kelly Zeeman in 2016. After Marken.
