= 2021–22 FC Nitra season =

Slovak football club season

FC Nitra
2021–22 season
- Owner: FC Nitra a. s.
- Chairman: Martin Peško (until 13 May)
- Head Coach: Michal Ščasný (until 24 January); Miloš Foltán (from 25 January to 12 April); Augustín Antalík (from 13 April to 4 June); Karol Karlík(from 5 June)
- Stadium: Štadión pod Zoborom, Nitra
- 3. Liga: 16th (relegated)
- Slovak Cup: Second round
- Top goalscorer: League: Adrián Mokoš (10); All: Matej Franko (12)
- Highest home attendance: 297 vs FK Slovan Levice (3. Liga, 18 September 2021)
- Lowest home attendance: 50 vs KFC Kalná nad Hronom (3. Liga, 2 October 2021)
- Biggest win: 3–0 vs FK Slovan Levice (3. Liga, 18 September 2021); 3–0 vs FK Tempo Partizánske (3. Liga, 6 March 2022)
- Biggest defeat: 1–6 vs OK Častkovce (3. Liga, 9 April 2022)
Home colours	Away colours

The 2021–22 season was FC Nitra's first season outside the top two tiers of Slovak football in 67 years. The club finished 16th in the third tier and was consequently relegated to the fourth tier. In the previous season, FC Nitra had competed in the top tier, but finished bottom of the table and was relegated. The club was due to compete in the second tier in the 2021–22 season, but was denied a licence to participate in either of the top two tiers due to outstanding debts and its poor financial situation, and was instead relegated to the third tier.

The club also competed in the Slovak Cup during the season, reaching the second round.

The match in the 26th round of the 3. Liga against KFC Kalná nad Hronom was awarded 3–0 to KFC Kalná nad Hronom, as FC Nitra's players walked off the pitch before the end of the match in protest against a refereeing decision.

== First-team squad ==
As of 15 June 2022

Note: Flags indicate national team as defined under FIFA eligibility rules; some limited exceptions apply. Players may hold more than one non-FIFA nationality.

No.	Pos.	Nation	Player
1	GK	SVK	Ľubomír Krátky
2	DF	SVK	Matúš Minka
3	DF	CMR	Russel Dieumbou Seutcho
4	DF	BRA	Douglas Nonato Oliveira Cruz
5	MF	BRA	Fabiano Donato Alves
5	MF	SVK	Kristián Kolembus
6	DF	SVK	Simon Vlasák
7	FW	SVK	Matej Franko (captain)
8	FW	NED	Louis Pedro
8	FW	SVK	Marko Ševčík
9	FW	SVK	Viktor Sabo
9	FW	ESP	Mamadou Traoré Coulibaly
10	FW	BRA	Cléber
11	MF	SVK	Šimon Kováč
12	FW	SVK	Ľubomír Šoky
13	FW	SVK	Adrián Mokoš
14	MF	SVK	Oliver Valo
14	MF	SVK	Šimon Boška
15	MF	TUN	Iheb Hadj Khalifa
15	FW	SVK	Lukáš Fiantok

No.	Pos.	Nation	Player
15	DF	SVK	Robert Stareček
15	MF	SVK	Adam Bujna
16	DF	SVK	Denis Pánsky
17	MF	SVK	Filip Baranovič
17	MF	SVK	Samuel Hodúr
18	MF	SVK	Kristián Polák
18	MF	SVK	Andreas Hajnovič
18	FW	SVK	Patrik Čiernik
19	DF	SVK	Michal Cehula
19	DF	SVK	Patrik Dibusz
19	MF	SVK	Jakub Sedláček
22	GK	SVK	Patrik Mego
—	GK	SVK	Peter Znamenák
—	MF	SVK	Kristian Urban
—	MF	SVK	Oliver Ölvecký
—	MF	SVK	Oliver Strečanský
—	MF	SVK	Samuel Mário Jakub
—	FW	SVK	Roman Kozma

== Coaching staff ==
As of 15 June 2022

Staff	Job title
(Slovakia) Michal Ščasný	Manager (until 24 January)
(Slovakia) Miloš Foltán	Manager (from 25 January to 12 April)
(Slovakia) Augustín Antalík	Manager (from 13 April to 4 June)
(Slovakia) Karol Karlík	Manager (from 5 June)
(Slovakia) Patrik Durkáč	Assistant manager (until 24 January)
(Slovakia) Peter Éhn	Assistant manager (from 13 April to 8 May)
(Slovakia) Miroslav König	Goalkeeping coach (until 24 January)
(Slovakia) Jozef Kučera	Team Doctor
(Slovakia) Radovan Líška	Physiotherapist
(Slovakia) Lukáš Čurgali	Physiotherapist

== Transfers and contracts ==
=== Released / out of contract ===
Date from	Pos.	Nationality	Player	Subsequent club	Joined date	Ref.
1 July 2021	MF	(Germany)	Sinan Kurt			

=== In ===
Date from	Pos.	Nationality	Player	From	Fee	Ref.
4 August 2021	MF	(Brazil)	Fabiano Donato Alves	(Brazil) Clube Esportivo Aimoré	Free	
5 August 2021	MF	(Tunisia)	Iheb Hadj Khalifa	(Denmark) Thisted FC	Free	
5 August 2021	FW	(Netherlands)	Louis Pedro	(Netherlands) SV TEC	Free	
13 August 2021	DF	(Brazil)	Douglas Nonato Oliveira Cruz	(Bosnia and Herzegovina) FK Rudar Prijedor	Free	
25 August 2021	DF	(Brazil)	Russel Dieumbou Seutcho	(Switzerland) Urania Genève Sport	Free	
30 August 2021	FW	(Spain)	Mamadou Traoré Coulibaly	(Spain) UD Mutilvera	Free	
31 August 2021	MF	(Slovakia)	Jakub Sedláček	(Slovakia) Partizán Bardejov	Free	

=== Out ===
Date from	Pos.	Nationality	Player	To	Fee	Ref.
15 June 2021	MF	(Slovakia)	Lukáš Fabiš	(Slovakia) MFK Ružomberok	Free	
15 June 2021	MF	(Slovakia)	Samuel Šefčík	(Slovakia) MFK Ružomberok	Free	
15 June 2021	MF	(Slovakia)	Ondrej Vrábel	(Slovakia) FC ŠTK 1914 Šamorín	Free	
28 June 2021	FW	(Slovakia)	Marián Chobot	(Slovakia) Slovan Bratislava	Free	
1 July 2021	DF	(Slovakia)	Matúš Kuník	(Slovakia) FC Petržalka	Free	
1 July 2021	MF	(Germany)	Oliver Bias	(Philippines) Azkals Development Club	Free	
1 July 2021	DF	(Tunisia)	Ramzi Ferjani	(Germany) FC Erzgebirge Aue	Free	
9 July 2021	MF	(Slovakia)	Ján Ferleťák	(Slovakia) DAC Dunajská Streda	Free	
9 July 2021	MF	(Brazil)	Bonilha	(Brazil) Figueirense FC	Free	
14 July 2021	DF	(Slovakia)	Patrik Rédeky	(Slovakia) FC Petržalka	Free	
14 July 2021	FW	(Slovakia)	Patrik Danek	(Slovakia) FC Petržalka	Free	
15 July 2021	GK	(Slovakia)	Tomáš Racik	(Slovakia) KFC Kalná nad Hronom	Free	
16 July 2021	MF	(Slovakia)	Branislav Spáčil	(Slovakia) FC Petržalka	Free	
18 July 2021	GK	(Slovakia)	Dávid Šípoš	(Czech Republic) Dynamo České Budějovice	Free	
19 July 2021	FW	(Slovakia)	Erik Jendrišek	(Slovakia) AS Trenčín	Free	
20 July 2021	DF	(Germany)	Ekin Çelebi	(Germany) VfB Stuttgart II	Free	
20 July 2021	DF	(Slovakia)	Erik Šuľa	(Slovakia) MFK Zemplín Michalovce	Free	
21 July 2021	MF	(Germany)	Benjamin Kindsvater	(Germany) VfR Aalen	Free	
21 July 2021	FW	(Switzerland)	Kilian Pagliuca	(Germany) Chemnitzer FC	Free	
22 July 2021	MF	(Germany)	Eroll Zejnullahu	(Germany) Berliner AK 07	Free	
31 July 2021	DF	(Slovakia)	Peter Chríbik	(Slovakia) MŠK Púchov	Free	
6 August 2021	MF	(Slovakia)	Gabriel Demian	(Germany) 1. FC Nürnberg	Free	
6 August 2021	DF	(Senegal)	Tidiane Djiby Ba	(Czech Republic) VfB Stuttgart II	Free	
11 November 2021	DF	(Germany)	Yanni Regäsel	(Germany) FC Rot-Weiß Koblenz	Free	
28 January 2022	DF	(Brazil)	Russel Dieumbou Seutcho	(France) FC Plessis Robinson	Free	
23 February 2022	DF	(Slovakia)	Simon Vlasák	(Slovakia) FC Petržalka	Free	

=== Loans in ===
Date from	Pos.	Nationality	Player	From	Until	Ref.
28 July 2021	FW	(Brazil)	Cléber	(Slovakia) ŠKF Sereď	30 June 2022	
28 July 2021	MF	(Slovakia)	Kristian Urban	(Slovakia) FC DAC 1904 Dunajská Streda	30 June 2022	
28 July 2021	MF	(Slovakia)	Oliver Strečanský	(Slovakia) FK Lokomotíva Trnava	30 June 2022	
28 July 2021	DF	(Slovakia)	Patrik Dibusz	(Slovakia) FKM Nové Zámky	30 June 2022	
28 July 2021	MF	(Slovakia)	Samuel Mário Jakub	(Slovakia) Spartak Bánovce nad Bebravou	30 June 2022	
6 August 2021	GK	(Slovakia)	Patrik Mego	(Slovakia) FC Spartak Trnava	30 June 2022	
28 July 2021	FW	(Slovakia)	Patrik Čiernik	(Slovakia) ŠK Váhovce	30 June 2022	
29 July 2021	MF	(Slovakia)	Šimon Boška	(Slovakia) ŠK Váhovce	30 June 2022	

=== Loans out ===
Date from	Pos.	Nationality	Player	To	Until	Ref.
19 July 2021	DF	(Slovakia)	Marko Bača	(Slovakia) MFK Dukla Banská Bystrica	30 June 2022	
22 July 2021	MF	(Slovakia)	Jakub Tancík	(Slovakia) MFK Ružomberok	30 June 2022	
31 August 2021	DF	(Slovakia)	Michal Cehula	(Slovakia) MFK Žarnovica	30 June 2022	
29 September 2021	DF	(Slovakia)	Viktor Sabo	(Slovakia) MFK Žarnovica	30 June 2022	
24 February 2022	FW	(Slovakia)	Matej Franko	(Slovakia) MFK Dukla Banská Bystrica	30 June 2022	

== Friendlies ==
Win Draw Loss

=== Pre-season ===
27 June 2021 Friendly	FC Nitra	5–1	TJ Družstevník Veľké Ludince	Nitra
16:00 CEST	Tancík (x); Franko (x)			Stadium: Štadión pod Zoborom

14 July 2021 Friendly	FC Nitra	5–1	FC Nitra U19	Nitra
16:00 CEST	Cléber (x); Franko (x); Sabo (x)			Stadium: Štadión pod Zoborom

31 July 2021 Friendly	FC Nitra	12–0	FC Slovan Hlohovec	Nitra
16:00 CEST	Franko (x); Cléber (x); Coulibaly (x); Kupča (x); Cruz (x)			Stadium: Štadión pod Zoborom

=== Mid-season ===
29 January 2022 Friendly	FC Nitra	2–0	FK Podkonice	Nitra
12:00 CET	Pánsky (x); Coulibaly (x)			Stadium: Štadión pod Zoborom

14 February 2022 Friendly	FC Nitra	2–1	MFK Nová Baňa	Nitra
18:00 CET	Pánsky (x); Cléber (x)			Stadium: Štadión pod Zoborom

== Competitions ==
=== 3. liga ===
==== League table (Western Group) ====
Pos	Team	Pld	W	D	L	GF	GA	GD	Pts	Promotion or relegation
1	Považská Bystrica (C, P)	34	27	4	3	90	27	+63	85	Promotion to 2. Liga
2	Spartak Myjava (P)	34	24	5	5	71	27	+44	77	Promotion to 2. Liga
3	Beluša	34	22	6	6	60	28	+32	72	
4	Slovan Duslo Šaľa	34	19	4	11	76	35	+41	61	
5	Kalná nad Hronom	34	15	11	8	49	44	+5	56	
6	Dynamo Malženice	34	15	8	11	62	44	+18	53	
7	Častkovce	34	15	7	12	67	40	+27	52	
8	Slovan Galanta	34	14	8	12	52	45	+7	50	
9	Nové Mesto nad Váhom	34	14	7	13	48	39	+9	49	
10	Družstevník Veľké Ludince	34	13	7	14	52	51	+1	46	
11	Nové Zámky	34	13	4	17	41	63	−22	43	
12	Marcelová (R)	34	10	10	14	40	45	−5	40	Relegation to 4. Liga
13	Imeľ (R)	34	10	9	15	36	55	−19	39	Relegation to 4. Liga
14	Crystal Lednické Rovne (R)	34	10	4	20	31	53	−22	34	Relegation to 4. Liga
15	ViOn Zlaté Moravce-Vráble B (R)	34	8	5	21	35	84	−49	29	Relegation to 4. Liga
16	FC Nitra (R)	34	8	2	24	42	75	−33	26	Relegation to 4. Liga
17	Levice (R)	34	6	8	20	27	79	−52	26	Relegation to 4. Liga
18	Partizánske (R)	34	5	7	22	35	80	−45	22	Relegation to 4. Liga

Updated to match(es) played on unknown. Source: Sportnet
Rules for classification: 1) Points; 2) Head-to-head points; 3) Head-to-head goal difference; 4) Head-to-head away goals scored; 5) Play-off.
(C) Champions; (P) Promoted; (R) Relegated

==== Matches ====
Win Draw Loss Fixtures

7 August 2021 1	MŠK Považská Bystrica	3-1	FC Nitra	Považská Bystrica
17:00 CEST	Boris 35'; Čiernik 45'; Hundák 85'	Report		Stadium: Stadium MŠK Považská Bystrica; Attendance: 250

14 August 2021 2	FC Nitra	2–1	FK Slovan Duslo Šaľa	Nitra
17:00 CEST	Pedro 13'; Franko 45'	Report	Kotlár 49'	Stadium: Štadión pod Zoborom; Attendance: 200

20 August 2021 3	Spartak Myjava	2–1	FC Nitra	Myjava
19:30 CEST	Pekár 55' (pen.); Pecha 90'	Report	Pedro 69'	Stadium: Stadium Myjava; Attendance: 328

29 August 2021 4	TJ Imeľ	3–1	FC Nitra	Imeľ
17:00 CEST	Kováč 6', 56'; Boros 14'	Report	Šoky 60'	Stadium: Futbalový štadión TJ Imeľ; Attendance: 150

1 September 2021 16	FK Tempo Partizánske	0-2	FC Nitra	Partizánske
16:00 CET		Report	Pedro 16'; Franko 76'	Stadium: Štadión Karola Jokla; Attendance: 120
Note: This match was played earlier by mutual agreement between the clubs.

4 September 2021 5	FC Nitra	2-1	OK Častkovce	Nitra
16:00 CEST	Cléber 24' (pen.); Pedro 43' (pen.)	Report	Zelenay 58'	Stadium: Štadión pod Zoborom; Attendance: 250

11 September 2021 6	AFC Nové Mesto	3-0	FC Nitra	Nové Mesto nad Váhom
16:00 CEST	Rapavý 19', 87'; Šebek 54'	Report		Stadium: Areál AFC Považan; Attendance: 150

15 September 2021 17	FC Nitra	0-2	FK Beluša	Beluša
16:00 CET		Report	Cisár 9' (penalty missed) 67; Holíček 35'	Stadium: Stadium TJ KOVO Beluša; Attendance: 100
Note: This match was played earlier by mutual agreement between the clubs.

18 September 2021 7	FC Nitra	3-0	FK Slovan Levice	Nitra
15:00 CEST	Franko 68', 87'; Pedro 54'	Report		Stadium: Štadión pod Zoborom; Attendance: 297

26 September 2021 8	FC Slovan Galanta	2-0	FC Nitra	Galanta
15:00 CEST	Horák 31'; Radványi 41'	Report		Stadium: Štadión FC Slovan Galanta; Attendance: 120

2 October 2021 9	FC Nitra	1-3	KFC Kalná nad Hronom	Nitra
14:30 CEST	Mokoš 67'	Report	Iheme 64', 82'; Mpofu 77'	Stadium: Štadión pod Zoborom; Attendance: 50

10 October 2021 10	ViOn Zlaté Moravce - Vráble B	3-0	FC Nitra	Vráble
14:30 CEST	Zrubec 6', 11'; Haspra 57'	Report		Stadium: Štadión Vráble; Attendance: 100

16 October 2021 11	FC Nitra	4-2	OFK Dynamo Malženice	Nitra
14:00 CEST	Frankol 17'; Pedro 71'; Mokoš 78'; Hodúr 90'	Report	Kudlička 40'; Čmilanský 50'	Stadium: Štadión pod Zoborom; Attendance: 120

24 October 2021 12	ŠK LR CRYSTAL	1-0	FC Nitra	Lednické Rovne
14:00 CEST	Púček 79'	Report		Stadium: Lednické Rovne Stadium; Attendance: 100

13 November 2021 15	FC Nitra	1-0	FK Marcelová	Nitra
13:30 CET	Mokoš 89'	Report		Stadium: Štadión pod Zoborom; Attendance: 100

17 November 2021 13	FC Nitra	4-2	Veľké Ludince	Nitra
13:30 CET	Pedro 17'; Mokoš 20'; Franko 54', 64'	Report	Sperka 68' (pen.); Podlucký 90'	Stadium: Štadión pod Zoborom; Attendance: 100

20 November 2021 14	FKM Nové Zámky	2-1	FC Nitra	Nové Zámky
13:30 CET	Homola 15' (pen.); Barta 77'	Report	Pedro 10'	Stadium: Ladislav Ganczner Stadium; Attendance: 50

6 March 2022 33	FC Nitra	3-0	FK Tempo Partizánske	Nitra
14:30 CET	Sedláček 8'; Cléber 14'; Mokoš 30'	Report		Stadium: Štadión pod Zoborom; Attendance: 250
Note: This match was played earlier by mutual agreement between the clubs.

13 March 2022 18	FC Nitra	1-3	MŠK Považská Bystrica	Nitra
15:00 CET	Cruz 36'	Report	Boris 11'; Zuziak 20', 32'	Stadium: Štadión pod Zoborom; Attendance: 250

19 March 2022 19	FK Slovan Duslo Šaľa	3-2	FC Nitra	Šaľa
15:00 CEST	Hučko 20'; Kochan 55'; Hlavatovič 90' (pen.)	Report	Sedláček 25'; Strečanský 60'	Stadium: Šaľa Stadium; Attendance: 200

27 March 2022 20	FC Nitra	0-1	Spartak Myjava	Nitra
15:00 CEST		Report	Mareš 36'	Stadium: Štadión pod Zoborom; Attendance: 165

3 April 2022 21	FC Nitra	1-2	TJ Imeľ	Nitra
15:30 CEST	Mokoš 73'	Report	Sádovský 45'; Beke 52'	Stadium: Štadión pod Zoborom; Attendance: 150

9 April 2022 22	OK Častkovce	6-1	FC Nitra	Častkovce
15:30 CEST	Harsányi 33', 45'; Minaroviech 36'; Sládek (penalty missed) 33 63', 69', 84'	Report	Coulibaly 55'	Stadium: Stadium OK Častkovce; Attendance: 106

14 April 2022 23	FC Nitra	1-2	AFC Nové Mesto	Nitra
16:00 CEST	Mokoš 39'	Report	Perea 23'; Rapavý 26'	Stadium: Štadión pod Zoborom; Attendance: 100

24 April 2022 24	FK Slovan Levice	2-2	FC Nitra	Levice
16:00 CEST	Švirik 23'; Kosák 71' (pen.)	Report	Coulibaly 18'; Pánsky 90'	Stadium: Futbalový štadión Levice; Attendance: 100

1 May 2022 25	FC Nitra	2-3	FC Slovan Galanta	Nitra
16:00 CEST	Mokoš 10', 23'	Report	Minarovič 22'; Eliáš 90'; Radványi 90'	Stadium: Štadión pod Zoborom; Attendance: 250

7 May 2022 26	KFC Kalná nad Hronom	3-0	FC Nitra	Kalná nad Hronom
16:30 CEST	Borsuk 19'	Report	Coulibaly 16'; Sedláček 67'	Stadium: KFC Kalná nad Hronom Stadium; Attendance: 150
Note: The FC Nitra team walked off the pitch in protest with the score at 1–2 to the visitors. The match was subsequently awarded to the home team by a score of 3–0.

15 May 2022 27	FC Nitra	1-3	ViOn Zlaté Moravce - Vráble B	Nitra
16:30 CEST	Pánsky 25'	Report	Kyziridis 15'; Horák 21', 43'	Stadium: Štadión pod Zoborom; Attendance: 250

22 May 2022 28	OFK Dynamo Malženice	4-3	FC Nitra	Malženice
17:00 CEST	Sekera 5', 78'; Jendrek 15'; Krajčovič 36'	Report	Fiantok 23', 90'; Cléber 89' (pen.)	Stadium: OFK Dynamo Malženice Stadium; Attendance: 100

25 May 2022 34	FK Beluša	3-0	FC Nitra	Beluša
17:00 CEST	Gáborík 11'; Németh 33'; Jánošík 57'	Report		Stadium: Stadium TJ KOVO Beluša; Attendance: 120
Note: This match was played earlier by mutual agreement between the clubs.

29 May 2022 29	FC Nitra	0-4	ŠK LR CRYSTAL	Nitra
17:00 CEST		Report	Jaroněk 32', 59'; Vavruš 43'; Chmelík 47'	Stadium: Štadión pod Zoborom; Attendance: 120

5 June 2022 30	TJ Družstevník Veľké Ludince	3-1	FC Nitra	Veľké Ludince
17:00 CEST	Baláž 42'; Domasta 64' (pen.); Sabo 81'	Report	Mokoš 90' (pen.)	Stadium: Štadión Veľké Ludince; Attendance: 200

11 June 2022 31	FC Nitra	0-1	FKM Nové Zámky	Nitra
17:00 CEST		Report	Švajda 81'	Stadium: Štadión pod Zoborom; Attendance: 120

18 June 2022 32	FK Marcelová	2-2	FC Nitra	Marcelová
17:00 CEST	Majel 32'; Németh 43'	Report	Coulibaly 28'; Dibusz 56'	Stadium: Futbalový štadión FK Marcelová; Attendance: 150

=== Slovak Cup ===
Win Loss Fixtures

24 July 2021 PrR	FK Veľký Cetín	0–7	FC Nitra	Veľký Cetín
		Report	Franko 28', 44' (pen.), 45+1', 72', 83' *Šoky 61' *Kováč 75' (pen.)	Stadium: Veľký Cetín Stadium; Attendance: 800

4 August 2021 1R	ŠK Báb	0–1	FC Nitra	Báb
		Report	Cléber 71' (pen.)	Stadium: Báb Stadium; Attendance: 800

25 August 2021 2R	TJ Nafta Gbely	2–1 (5–3 p)	FC Nitra	Gbely
	Bartal 13'	Report	Cruz 68'	Stadium: Stadium Gbely; Attendance: 100

== Statistics ==
=== Goalscorers ===
Rank	No.	Pos.	Nat.	Player	4. Liga	Slovak Cup	Total
1	7	FW	(Slovakia)	Matej Franko	7	5	12
2	13	FW	(Slovakia)	Adrián Mokoš	10	0	10
3	8	FW	(Netherlands)	Louis Pedro	6	0	6
4	9	FW	(Spain)	Mamadou Traoré Coulibaly	4	0	4
4	10	FW	(Brazil)	Cléber	3	1	4
5	19	MF	(Slovakia)	Jakub Sedláček	3	0	3
6	16	DF	(Slovakia)	Denis Pánsky	2	0	2
6	15	FW	(Slovakia)	Lukáš Fiantok	2	0	2
6	9	DF	(Brazil)	Douglas Nonato Oliveira Cruz	1	1	2
6	12	FW	(Slovakia)	Ľubomír Šoky	1	1	2
7		MF	(Slovakia)	Oliver Strečanský	1	0	1
7	19	DF	(Slovakia)	Patrik Dibusz	1	0	1
7	17	MF	(Slovakia)	Samuel Hodúr	1	0	1
7	11	MF	(Slovakia)	Šimon Kováč	0	1	1
Own goals					0	0	0
Totals					42	9	51
