= 2020–21 FC Nitra season =

Slovak football club season

FC Nitra
2020–21 season
- Owner: FC Nitra a. s.
- Chairman: Ladislav Palaky (until 5 October); Erika Karová (from 10 November to 4 March); Martin Peško (from 16 March)
- Head Coach: Gergely Geri (until 1 December); Ivan Galád (interim) (from 1 December to 4 January); Michal Ščasný (from 4 January to 22 January); Peter Lérant (from 22 January to 25 March); Michal Ščasný(from 26 March)
- Stadium: Štadión pod Zoborom, Nitra
- Slovak 1st League: 12th (relegated)
- Slovak Cup: Third round
- Top goalscorer: League: Michal Faško (8); All: Michal Faško (8)
- Highest home attendance: 2,536 vs Slovan Bratislava (First League, 8 August 2020)
- Lowest home attendance: 285 vs FK Pohronie (First League, 12 September 2020)
- Biggest win: 5–0 vs MFK Zvolen (Slovak Cup, 16 September 2020)
- Biggest defeat: 0–6 vs DAC Dunajská Streda (First League, 15 August 2020)
Home colours	Away colours

The 2020–21 season was FC Nitra's fourth consecutive season in the top division of Slovak football. The club finished eighth in the regular season and subsequently competed in the relegation group, where it finished bottom. FC Nitra therefore finished 12th overall and were relegated. The club's season was heavily affected by serious financial and ownership problems, which culminated in the departure of 19 players in December 2020 after the club failed to pay them several months' wages. The resulting instability also contributed to the club's poor results and led to several changes in the position of head coach.

The club changed ownership several times during the season. Ukrainian investors had become involved with the club during the previous season and took control in January 2020. However, the Ukrainian investors failed to meet the conditions required to take over the club and subsequently withdrew from FC Nitra. In November 2020, the club was purchased by the married couple Erika Karová and Ján Kara, who acquired a 67% stake in the club. In December 2020, German investors Peter Hammer and Nik Schwarz became involved with the club. As a condition of their investment, the club's management was required to settle its outstanding debts from previous years. The German investors would then exercise an option to acquire shares in the club. They also helped the club recruit several new players, particularly from Germany. The most notable signing they arranged was Slovakia international Erik Jendrišek. In March 2021, however, the German investors decided to withdraw from the agreement after failing to reach an agreement with the club's owners. According to the German investors, the club's owner had failed to reduce the club's outstanding debts from previous years, which had been one of the main conditions for their involvement with the club.

This instability, combined with the club's debts to its players and other parties, meant that FC Nitra failed to obtain the required licence for the following season. Instead of being relegated to the second tier, the club was administratively relegated to the third tier. As a result, from the following season onwards, FC Nitra were no longer competing in either of the country's two highest divisions for the first time in 67 years.

Due to the COVID-19 pandemic, football matches were played behind closed doors from the beginning of October 2020 onwards.

In the Slovak Cup that season, the club were eliminated in the third round after losing to TJD Príbelce, a club from the fourth tier.

== First-team squad ==
As of 15 June 2021

Note: Flags indicate national team as defined under FIFA eligibility rules; some limited exceptions apply. Players may hold more than one non-FIFA nationality.

No.	Pos.	Nation	Player
1	GK	SVK	Dávid Šípoš
2	DF	SVK	Patrik Rédeky
4	DF	SVK	Erik Šuľa
5	DF	SVK	Kristián Kolčák (captain)
6	MF	SRB	Alen Mustafić
7	FW	ARM	Armen Hovhannisyan
7	MF	BRA	Daniel Jesus
7	MF	GER	Sinan Kurt
8	MF	SVK	Ondrej Vrábel
10	MF	SVK	Samuel Šefčík
11	MF	SVK	Lukáš Fabiš
13	DF	SVK	Daniel Magda
13	MF	GER	Oliver Bias
13	MF	SVK	Gabriel Demian
14	MF	GER	Ole Käuper
15	DF	SVK	Michal Cehula
15	DF	SVK	Viktor Radványi
16	FW	SVK	Marián Chobot
17	DF	SVK	Timotej Záhumenský
17	DF	GER	Ekin Çelebi
18	FW	SVK	Matej Franko
19	FW	SVK	Patrik Danek
20	DF	SVK	Oliver Podhorin (captain)
21	DF	SVK	Róbert Kóša

No.	Pos.	Nation	Player
21	MF	ITA	Matteo Olivero
21	DF	SEN	Tidiane Djiby Ba
22	DF	SVK	Matúš Kuník
22	DF	SVK	Peter Chríbik
23	MF	SVK	Michal Faško
23	MF	GER	Benjamin Kindsvater
24	DF	TUN	Ramzi Ferjani
24	MF	SVK	Andrej Pekár
25	MF	CRO	Nikola Gatarić
25	MF	SVK	Branislav Spáčil
26	FW	SVK	Erik Jendrišek (captain)
27	MF	SVK	Martin Adamec
27	MF	GER	Eroll Zejnullahu
28	FW	SUI	Kilian Pagliuca
31	GK	SVK	Michal Trnovský
32	GK	SVK	Erik Búš
32	GK	SVK	Tomáš Racik
32	GK	SVK	Ľubomír Krátky
39	DF	GER	Yanni Regäsel
44	FW	SVK	Ádam Mészáros
55	GK	ISR	Ariel Harush
77	FW	SVK	Jakub Tancík
77	MF	SVK	Ján Ferleťák
96	MF	BRA	Bonilha

== Coaching staff ==
As of 15 June 2021

Staff	Job title
(Slovakia) Gergely Geri	Manager (until 1 December)
(Slovakia) Ivan Galád (interim)	Manager (from 1 December to 4 January)
(Slovakia) Michal Ščasný	Manager (from 4 January to 22 January)
(Slovakia) Peter Lérant	Manager (from 22 January to 25 March)
(Slovakia) Michal Ščasný	Manager (from 26 March)
(Slovakia) Miroslav König	Assistant manager/Goalkeeper Coach
(Slovakia) Ivan Galád	Assistant manager (from 3 October to 1 December)
(Slovakia) Patrik Durkáč	Assistant manager (from 26 March)
(Slovakia) Igor Bakaľár	Fitness coach
(Slovakia) Marek Tomiš	Fitness coach
(Slovakia) Ivan Štefanov	Team Doctor
(Slovakia) Milan Michalčin	Team Doctor
(Slovakia) Štefan Balla	Physiotherapist
(Slovakia) Jozef Urminský	Physiotherapist

== Transfers and contracts ==
=== In ===
Date from	Pos.	Nationality	Player	From	Fee	Ref.
7 August 2020	FW	(Armenia)	Armen Hovhannisyan	(Slovakia) MFK Zemplín Michalovce	Free	
7 August 2020	DF	(Slovakia)	Timotej Záhumenský	(Slovakia) DAC Dunajská Streda	Free	
7 August 2020	MF	(Slovakia)	Martin Adamec	(Poland) Jagiellonia Białystok	Free	
25 September 2020	MF	(Italy)	Matteo Olivero	(Cyprus) Pafos FC	Free	
2 October 2020	DF	(Slovakia)	Erik Šuľa	(Czech Republic) FK Třinec	Free	
2 October 2020	MF	(Brazil)	Bonilha	(Brazil) Osasco Sporting	Free	
25 November 2020	GK	(Israel)	Ariel Harush	(Netherlands) Sparta Rotterdam	Free	
26 January 2021	DF	(Tunisia)	Ramzi Ferjani	Free agent	Free	
27 January 2021	DF	(Germany)	Ekin Çelebi	(Germany) 1. FC Nürnberg II	Free	
29 January 2021	FW	(Slovakia)	Erik Jendrišek	(Greece) Volos F.C.	Free	
30 January 2021	FW	(Slovakia)	Ádam Mészáros	(Slovakia) FK Marcelová	Free	
1 February 2021	MF	(Germany)	Benjamin Kindsvater	(Germany) TSV 1860 Munich	Free	
1 February 2021	DF	(Germany)	Yanni Regäsel	(Germany) MSV Duisburg	Free	
3 February 2021	MF	(Germany)	Sinan Kurt	(Germany) SV 19 Straelen	Free	
3 February 2021	DF	(Senegal)	Tidiane Djiby Ba	(Slovakia) FK Třinec	Free	
3 February 2021	MF	(Germany)	Eroll Zejnullahu	(Germany) FC Carl Zeiss Jena	Free	
3 February 2021	DF	(Slovakia)	Peter Chríbik	(Slovakia) FK Pohronie	Free	
3 February 2021	MF	(Slovakia)	Tomáš Hambálek	(Slovakia) Spartak Trnava	Free	
4 February 2021	MF	(Germany)	Oliver Bias	(Germany) FSV Optik Rathenow	Free	
14 April 2021	FW	(Switzerland)	Kilian Pagliuca	(Germany) FC Carl Zeiss Jena	Free	

=== Out ===
Date from	Pos.	Nationality	Player	To	Fee	Ref.
18 July 2020	DF	(Slovakia)	Sebastian Kóša	(Slovakia) Spartak Trnava	Free	
18 July 2020	MF	(Slovakia)	Tomáš Hambálek	(Slovakia) Spartak Trnava	Free	
22 July 2020	GK	(Slovakia)	Martin Kuciak	(Slovakia) MŠK Považská Bystrica	Free	
1 August 2020	DF	(Slovakia)	Ondrej Elexa	(Slovakia) FC Košice	Free	
10 August 2020	DF	(Slovakia)	Marek Dubeň	(Austria) FC Mauerwerk	Free	
26 August 2020	MF	(Croatia)	Duje Javorčić	(Croatia) NK Dugopolje	Free	
26 August 2020	FW	(Croatia)	Ante Kuliš	(Croatia) NK Otok	Free	
26 September 2020	DF	(Ukraine)	Dmytro Nyemchaninov	(Ukraine) NK Veres Rivne	Free	
29 September 2020	FW	(Armenia)	Armen Hovhannisyan	FC Ararat-Armenia	Free	
13 January 2021	DF	(Slovakia)	Timotej Záhumenský	(Czech Republic) FC Zbrojovka Brno	Free	
13 January 2021	GK	(Israel)	Ariel Harush	(Netherlands) SC Heerenveen	Free	
15 January 2021	MF	(Slovakia)	Michal Faško	(Czech Republic) FC Slovan Liberec	Free	
28 January 2021	MF	(Croatia)	Nikola Gatarić	(Cyprus) Ermis Aradippou FC	Free	
3 February 2021	MF	(Slovakia)	Martin Adamec	(Slovakia) FK Pohronie	Free	
8 February 2021	DF	(Slovakia)	Oliver Podhorin	(Poland) Resovia Rzeszów	Free	

=== Loans in ===
Date from	Pos.	Nationality	Player	From	Until	Ref.
4 August 2020	GK	(Slovakia)	Michal Trnovský	(Slovakia) Dukla Banská Bystrica	30 June 2021	
5 August 2020	DF	(Slovakia)	Daniel Magda	(Slovakia) FK Železiarne Podbrezová	30 June 2021	
7 August 2020	MF	(Serbia)	Alen Mustafić	(Slovakia) Slovan Bratislava	30 June 2021	
11 August 2020	DF	(Slovakia)	Kristián Kolčák	(Slovakia) FC Petržalka	30 June 2021	
6 October 2020	DF	(Brazil)	Daniel Jesus	(Brazil) Grêmio Novorizontino	31 December 2020	
28 January 2021	MF	(Germany)	Ole Käuper	(Germany) SV Werder Bremen II	4 May 2021	

=== Loans out ===
Date from	Pos.	Nationality	Player	To	Until	Ref.
21 July 2020	MF	(Slovakia)	Frederik Bilovský	(Slovakia) FK Spartak Dubnica nad Váhom	30 June 2021	
21 July 2020	MF	(Slovakia)	Miloš Šimončič	(Slovakia) OFK 1948 Veľký Lapáš	30 July 2021	
30 July 2020	DF	(Slovakia)	Pavol Farkaš	(Slovakia) Spartak Myjava	30 January 2021	
24 September 2020	GK	(Slovakia)	Ľubomír Krátky	(Slovakia) MFK Alekšince	30 June 2021	
2 February 2021	DF	(Slovakia)	Pavol Farkaš	(Slovakia) FC Petržalka	30 June 2021	
17 February 2021	DF	(Slovakia)	Matúš Kuník	(Slovakia) ŠKF Sereď	30 June 2021	
6 April 2021	DF	(Slovakia)	Viktor Radványi	(Slovakia) ŠKF Sereď	30 June 2021	

== Friendlies ==
Win Draw Loss

=== Pre-season ===
31 July 2020 Friendly	FC Nitra	1–1	(Czech Republic) Baník Ostrava	Nitra
19:00 CEST	Hovhannisyan 49'		Pokorný 56'	Stadium: Štadión pod Zoborom

=== Mid-season ===
16 January 2021 Friendly	FC Nitra	2–1	MŠK Púchov	Nitra
14:00 CET	Mustafić 45', 52'		Krčula 42'	Stadium: Štadión pod Zoborom

20 January 2021 Friendly	FC Nitra	2–4	FC ŠTK Šamorín	Nitra
11:00 CET	Šefčík 4'; Celestine 54'			Stadium: Štadión pod Zoborom

27 January 2021 Friendly	Spartak Dubnica	1–1	FC Nitra	Dubnica
13:00 CET			Kurt 88'	Stadium: Mestský štadión

30 January 2021 Friendly	FC Nitra	0–1	FC Petržalka	Nitra
11:00 CET				Stadium: Štadión pod Zoborom

== Competitions ==
=== Slovak First Football League ===
==== League tables ====
===== Regular stage =====
Pos	Team	Pld	W	D	L	GF	GA	GD	Pts	Qualification
1	Slovan Bratislava	22	17	3	2	54	12	+42	54	Qualification for the championship group
2	DAC Dunajská Streda	22	13	5	4	48	28	+20	44	Qualification for the championship group
3	Žilina	22	11	4	7	49	33	+16	37	Qualification for the championship group
4	Spartak Trnava	22	11	2	9	32	29	+3	35	Qualification for the championship group
5	Zlaté Moravce	22	9	6	7	38	29	+9	33	Qualification for the championship group
6	Trenčín	22	7	7	8	30	38	−8	28	Qualification for the championship group
7	Ružomberok	22	5	8	9	31	37	−6	23	Qualification for the relegation group
8	Nitra	22	6	4	12	21	38	−17	22	Qualification for the relegation group
9	Zemplín Michalovce	22	5	7	10	22	42	−20	22	Qualification for the relegation group
10	Sereď	22	5	7	10	22	39	−17	22	Qualification for the relegation group
11	Senica	22	5	6	11	23	40	−17	21	Qualification for the relegation group
12	Pohronie	22	3	11	8	27	32	−5	20	Qualification for the relegation group

Source: Niké liga (in Slovak)
Rules for classification: 1) Points; 2) Head-to-head points; 3) Head-to-head goal difference; 4) Head-to-head away goals scored; 5) Play-off.

===== Relegation group =====
Pos	Team	Pld	W	D	L	GF	GA	GD	Pts	Qualification or relegation
7	Sereď	32	11	8	13	37	48	−11	41	Qualification for the Europa Conference League play-offs
8	Ružomberok	32	10	9	13	41	44	−3	39	
9	Pohronie	32	8	14	10	38	38	0	38	
10	Zemplín Michalovce	32	8	11	13	34	53	−19	35	
11	Senica (O)	32	8	9	15	31	51	−20	33	Qualification for the relegation play-offs
12	Nitra (R)	32	7	6	19	26	55	−29	27	Relegation to the 2. Liga

Source: Niké liga (in Slovak)
Rules for classification: 1) Points; 2) Head-to-head points; 3) Head-to-head goal difference; 4) Head-to-head away goals scored; 5) Play-off.
(O) Play-off winners; (R) Relegated

==== Regular stage ====
Win Draw Loss Fixtures

8 August 2020 1	FC Nitra	0-5	Slovan Bratislava	Nitra
18:00 CEST	Šefčík (yellow card) 1'; Vrábel (yellow card) 59'; Hovhannisyan (yellow card) 63'	Report	Medved 12', 49'; Rabiu 37'; Magda 42' (o.g.); Strelec 45'; de Kamps (yellow card) 69'	Stadium: Štadión pod Zoborom; Attendance: 2,536; Referee: Peter Ziemba

11 August 2020 2	MŠK Žilina	1–2	FC Nitra	Žilina
19:00 CEST	Gono (yellow card) 42'; Bichakhchyan 45'; Vallo (yellow card) 58'	Report	Faško 56', 66'; Šefčík (yellow card) 58'; Záhumenský (yellow card) 82'	Stadium: Štadión pod Dubňom; Attendance: 1,705; Referee: Filip Glova

15 August 2020 3	DAC Dunajská Streda	6–0	FC Nitra	Dunajská Streda
19:00 CEST	Friede 42'; Davis 45' (pen.), 73'; Divković 56'; Kalmár 60' (pen.); Bednár 85'	Report	Mustafić (yellow card) 58'; Faško (yellow card) 63'; Záhumenský (yellow card) 67'	Stadium: MOL Aréna; Attendance: 5,831; Referee: Ivan Kružliak

22 August 2020 4	FC Nitra	1–1	MFK Ružomberok	Nitra
19:00 CEST	Kolčák (yellow card) 30'; Faško 87'	Report	Kmeť (yellow card) 48'; Zsigmund 51'; Kochan (yellow card) 90'	Stadium: Štadión pod Zoborom; Attendance: 863; Referee: Peter Kráľovič

28 August 2020 5	FK Senica	0-0	FC Nitra	Senica
18:30 CEST	Didiba (yellow card) 71'; Addo (yellow card) 83'	Report	Kuník (yellow card) 62'; Gatarić (yellow card) 68'	Stadium: OMS Arena; Attendance: 823; Referee: Filip Glova

12 September 2020 6	FC Nitra	3-1	FK Pohronie	Nitra
19:00 CEST	Kolčák 22'; Fabiš (yellow card) 40'; Danek 90'	Report	Župa (yellow card) 20'; Fadera (yellow card) 31'; Mazan 65'; Chríbik (yellow card) 77'; Pavlík (yellow card) 86'; Weir 88' (o.g.)	Stadium: Štadión pod Zoborom; Attendance: 285; Referee: Michal Očenáš

19 September 2020 7	AS Trenčín	3-2	FC Nitra	Trenčín
19:00 CEST	Ligeon 11'; Ghali 22'; Čataković 56' (pen.); Šulek (yellow card) 75'	Report	Podhorin 32'; Mustafić (yellow card) 44'; Kuník (yellow card) 69'; Faško 76'	Stadium: Štadión Sihoť; Attendance: 129; Referee: Peter Ziemba

26 September 2020 8	FC Nitra	3-0	ŠKF Sereď	Nitra
19:00 CEST	Adamec 2'; Franko (yellow card) 30'; Faško 45', 52' (pen.); Magda (yellow card) 56'; Mustafić (yellow card) 90'	Report	Hučko (yellow card) 10'; Iván (yellow card) 41'; Yakubu (yellow card) 52'; Djiby Ba (yellow card) 60'; Jarović (yellow card) 78'	Stadium: Štadión pod Zoborom; Attendance: 473; Referee: Adam Somoláni

3 October 2020 9	Spartak Trnava	0-2	FC Nitra	Trnava
19:00 CEST	Turňa (yellow card) 45'	Report	Gatarić (yellow card) 31'; Adamec 45'; Chobot 66'	Stadium: Anton Malatinský Stadium; Attendance: 0 Referee: Dušan Sedlák
Note: Due to the COVID-19 pandemic, matches were played behind closed doors.

17 October 2020 10	ViOn Zlaté Moravce	3-1	FC Nitra	Zlaté Moravce
17:00 CEST	Moško (yellow card) 14'; Balaj 34' (pen.), 63' (pen.), 84'; Chren (yellow card) 36'; Hrnčár (yellow card) 57'; Menich (yellow card) 72'	Report	Faško 3'; Kuník (yellow card) 33'; Mustafić (yellow card) 40'; Gatarić (yellow card) 44'	Stadium: ViOn Aréna; Attendance: 0 Referee: Erik Gemzický
Note: Due to the COVID-19 pandemic, matches were played behind closed doors.

24 October 2020 11	FC Nitra	1-1	Zemplín Michalovce	Nitra
17:00 CEST	Gatarićl 10'; Podhorin (yellow card) 43'; Adamec (yellow card) 62'; Kolčák (yellow card) 83'	Report	Tandir 43' (pen.); Pino (yellow card) 59'; Ondrík (yellow card) 61'	Stadium: Štadión pod Zoborom; Attendance: 0 Referee: Michal Smolák
Note: Due to the COVID-19 pandemic, matches were played behind closed doors.

1 November 2020 12	Slovan Bratislava	0-1	FC Nitra	Bratislava
17:00 CEST	Holman (yellow card) 86'; Weiss (yellow card) 90'	Report	Gatarić (yellow card) 50'; Mustafić 62'; Geri (yellow card) 73'	Stadium: Tehelné pole Attendance: 0 Referee: Martin Dohál
Note: Due to the COVID-19 pandemic, matches were played behind closed doors.

8 November 2020 13	FC Nitra	0-3	MŠK Žilina	Nitra
16:00 CET	Kuník (yellow card) 7'	Report	Kurminowski (penalty missed) 8 90'; Bichakhchyan 56'; Sluka (yellow card) 79'; Fazlagikj (yellow card) 85'; Kaprálik (yellow card) 87'; Paur 90'	Stadium: Štadión pod Zoborom; Attendance: 0 Referee: Adam Somoláni
Note: Due to the COVID-19 pandemic, matches were played behind closed doors.

21 November 2020 14	FC Nitra	0-1	DAC Dunajská Streda	Nitra
17:00 CET	Kuník (yellow card) 80'; Danek (yellow card) 90'	Report	Divković 50'; Schäfer (yellow card) 73'; Müller (yellow card) 77'; Balić (yellow card) 84'	Stadium: Štadión pod Zoborom; Attendance: 0 Referee: Martin Dohál
Note: Due to the COVID-19 pandemic, matches were played behind closed doors.

28 November 2020 15	MFK Ružomberok	3-0	FC Nitra	Ružomberok
14:00 CET	Madleňák 8'; Almási 34'; Takáč 38'; Mrva (yellow card) 68'; Kojnok (yellow card) 83'	Report	Podhorin (yellow card) 77'	Stadium: Štadión pod Čebraťom; Attendance: 0 Referee: Michal Očenáš
Note: Due to the COVID-19 pandemic, matches were played behind closed doors.

5 December 2020 16	FC Nitra	1-1	FK Senica	Nitra
14:00 CET	Podhorin (yellow card) 83'; Faško 90' (pen.)	Report	Malec 31'; Kopečný (yellow card) 88'; Asanović (yellow card) 90'	Stadium: Štadión pod Zoborom; Attendance: 0 Referee: Dušan Sedlák
Note: Due to the COVID-19 pandemic, matches were played behind closed doors.

16 December 2020 18	FC Nitra	1-2	AS Trenčín	Nitra
14:00 CET	Mustafić 73'	Report	Kadák (yellow card) 21'; Zubairu 60'; Čataković 87'	Stadium: Štadión pod Zoborom; Attendance: 0 Referee: Filip Glova
Note: Due to the COVID-19 pandemic, matches were played behind closed doors.

6 February 2021 17	FK Pohronie	3-1	FC Nitra	Žilina
16:00 CET	Da Silva 13' (pen.), 90'; Štrba 80'; Heurtaux (yellow card) 86'	Report	Pagliuca 30'; Kolčák (yellow card) 80'	Stadium: Štadión pod Dubňom; Attendance: 0 Referee: Martin Dohál
Note: Due to the COVID-19 pandemic, matches were played behind closed doors. The match was played at a later date. It was played in Žilina because the pitch at the home team's stadium was unfit for play.

20 February 2021 20	FC Nitra	0-1	Spartak Trnava	Nitra
15:00 CEST	Šefčík (yellow card) 21'	Report	Olejník (yellow card) 33'; Savvidis 79'	Stadium: Štadión pod Zoborom; Attendance: 0 Referee: Martin Dohál
Note: Due to the COVID-19 pandemic, matches were played behind closed doors.

23 February 2021 19	ŠKF Sereď	1-2	FC Nitra	Zlaté Moravce
14:00 CEST	Fábry 18' (yellow card) 75'; Slaninka (yellow card) 22' (yellow-red card) 42'	Report	Tancík (yellow card) 1'; Jendrišek 2', 55'; Kolčák (yellow card) 16'; Çelebi (yellow card) 75' (yellow-red card) 90'; Urminský (yellow card) 78'	Stadium: ViOn Aréna; Attendance: 0 Referee: Erik Gemzický
Note: Due to the COVID-19 pandemic, matches were played behind closed doors. The match was played at the stadium in Zlaté Moravce because the home team's stadium did not meet the required criteria.

27 February 2021 21	FC Nitra	0-1	ViOn Zlaté Moravce	Nitra
14:00 CEST	Zejnullahu (yellow card) 10'; Mustafić (yellow card) 19'; Regäsel (yellow card) 20'; Djiby Ba (yellow card) 33'; Mészáros (yellow card) 49'	Report	Balaj 21' (pen.); Beke (yellow card) 74' (yellow-red card) 85'	Stadium: Štadión pod Zoborom; Attendance: 0 Referee: Michal Očenáš
Note: Due to the COVID-19 pandemic, matches were played behind closed doors.

6 March 2021 22	MFK Zemplín Michalovce	1-0	FC Nitra	Michalovce
14:30 CEST	Žofčák (penalty missed) 65; Popović 87'	Report		Stadium: Mestský futbalový štadión Attendance: 0 Referee: Michal Smolák
Note: Due to the COVID-19 pandemic, matches were played behind closed doors.

==== Relegation group ====
Win Draw Loss Fixtures

13 March 2021 23/1	MFK Zemplín Michalovce	1-1	FC Nitra	Michalovce
17:00 CEST	Vaško (yellow card) 10'; Tandir (yellow card) 70' (goal) 83' (pen.); Marković (yellow card) 90'	Report	Fabiš (yellow card) 20' (yellow-red card) 82'; Vaško 90' (o.g.)	Stadium: Mestský futbalový štadión Attendance: 0 Referee: Michal Očenáš
Note: Due to the COVID-19 pandemic, matches were played behind closed doors.

20 March 2021 24/2	FC Nitra	2-3	FK Pohronie	Nitra
17:02 CEST	Tancík 39' (yellow card) 90'; Mustafić (yellow card) 53'; Šuľa (yellow card) 88'; Franko 89'	Report	Da Silva 42' (pen.); Chvěja 51', 63'; Petrák (yellow card) 58'; Pavlík (yellow card) 68'; Heurtaux (yellow card) 88'	Stadium: Štadión pod Zoborom; Attendance: 0 Referee: Adam Somoláni
Note: Due to the COVID-19 pandemic, matches were played behind closed doors.

3 April 2021 25/3	FC Nitra	1-0	MFK Ružomberok	Nitra
17:00 CEST	Jendrišek (penalty missed) 19; Kolčák 73'	Report	Čurma (yellow card) 32'; Kochan (yellow card) 81' (yellow-red card) 90'	Stadium: Štadión pod Zoborom; Attendance: 0 Referee: Martin Dohál
Note: Due to the COVID-19 pandemic, matches were played behind closed doors.

10 April 2021 26/4	ŠKF Sereď	2-1	FC Nitra	Zlaté Moravce
17:00 CEST	Fábry 68' (pen.); Danko (yellow card) 70'; Hučko 85' (yellow card) 90'	Report	Franko (yellow card) 15'; Mustafić (yellow card) 41'; Šefčík 45' (yellow card) 73'; Kolčák (yellow card) 67'; Djiby Ba (red card) 68'	Stadium: ViOn Aréna; Attendance: 0 Referee: Adam Somoláni
Note: Due to the COVID-19 pandemic, matches were played behind closed doors. The match was played at the stadium in Zlaté Moravce because the home team's stadium did not meet the required criteria.

17 April 2021 27/5	FC Nitra	0-3	FK Senica	Nitra
17:00 CEST	Fabiš (yellow card) 5'; Jendrišek (yellow card) 31'; Šefčík (yellow card) 45'; Tancík (yellow card) 45+2' (yellow-red card) 49'	Report	Piroska (penalty missed) 6; Malec 11' (pen.); Guba 24'; Košťál 37'; Addo (yellow card) 53'; Turčák (yellow card) 66'	Stadium: Štadión pod Zoborom; Attendance: 0 Referee: Peter Ziemba
Note: Due to the COVID-19 pandemic, matches were played behind closed doors.

24 April 2021 28/6	FK Pohronie	0-0	FC Nitra	Žiar nad Hronom
17:00 CEST	Weir (yellow card) 43'; Adamec (yellow card) 86'	Report		Stadium: Mestský štadión Attendance: 0 Referee: Peter Kráľovič
Note: Due to the COVID-19 pandemic, matches were played behind closed doors.

1 May 2021 29/7	FK Senica	1-0	FC Nitra	Senica
17:00 CEST	Košťál 60'; Gamboš (yellow card) 90'	Report	Kindsvater (yellow card) 15'; Šefčík (yellow card) 42'; Franko (yellow card) 56'	Stadium: OMS Arena; Attendance: 0 Referee: Peter Kráľovič
Note: Due to the COVID-19 pandemic, matches were played behind closed doors.

9 May 2021 30/8	FC Nitra	0-1	ŠKF Sereď	Nitra
18:00 CEST	Djiby Ba (yellow card) 44'; Mustafić (yellow card) 71'	Report	Iván 42' (yellow card) 65'; Fábry (penalty missed) 67; Bušnja (yellow card) 90'; Mečiar (yellow card) 90'	Stadium: Štadión pod Zoborom; Attendance: 0 Referee: Peter Kráľovič
Note: Due to the COVID-19 pandemic, matches were played behind closed doors.

15 May 2021 31/9	MFK Ružomberok	2-0	FC Nitra	Ružomberok
17:00 CEST	Zsigmund (yellow card) 43' (goal) 78'; Kostadinov (penalty missed) 69 (yellow card) 71'; Regáli 90'	Report	Çelebi (yellow card) 47'	Stadium: Štadión pod Čebraťom; Attendance: 0 Referee: Martin Dohál
Note: Due to the COVID-19 pandemic, matches were played behind closed doors.

22 May 2021 32/10	FC Nitra	0-4	MFK Zemplín Michalovce	Nitra
19:00 CEST	Spáčil (yellow card) 90'	Report	Pino (yellow card) 5'; Trusa 31'; Oshima 45' (yellow card) 53'; Sharani 52'; Popović 69'	Stadium: Štadión pod Zoborom; Attendance: 0 Referee: Peter Kráľovič
Note: Due to the COVID-19 pandemic, matches were played behind closed doors.

=== Slovak Cup ===
Win Loss Fixtures

16 September 2020 2R	MFK Zvolen	0–5	FC Nitra	Zvolen
		Report	Šefčík 25', 31' *Fabiš 45+1' *Danek 68' *Podhorin 77'	Stadium: Futbal Aréna Zvolen; Attendance: 153; Referee: Adam Somoláni

29 September 2020 3R	TJD Príbelce	2–1	FC Nitra	Príbelce
	Santoris 2' *Kurák 11'	Report	Mustafić 45+2' (yellow card) 80' *Faško (yellow card) 90'	Stadium: Príbelce Stadium; Attendance: 500; Referee: Patrik Papuča

== Statistics ==
=== Goalscorers ===
Rank	No.	Pos.	Nat.	Player	First League	Slovak Cup	Total
1	23	MF	(Slovakia)	Michal Faško	8	0	8
2	6	MF	(Serbia)	Alen Mustafić	2	1	3
2	10	MF	(Slovakia)	Samuel Šefčík	1	2	3
3	26	FW	(Slovakia)	Erik Jendrišek	2	0	2
3	5	DF	(Slovakia)	Kristián Kolčák	2	0	2
3	27	MF	(Slovakia)	Martin Adamec	2	0	2
3	20	DF	(Slovakia)	Oliver Podhorin	1	1	2
3	19	MF	(Slovakia)	Patrik Danek	1	1	2
4	77	MF	(Slovakia)	Jakub Tancík	1	0	1
4	28	FW	(Switzerland)	Kilian Pagliuca	1	0	1
4	16	MF	(Slovakia)	Marián Chobot	1	0	1
4	18	FW	(Slovakia)	Matej Franko	1	0	1
4	25	MF	(Croatia)	Nikola Gatarić	1	0	1
4	11	DF	(Slovakia)	Lukáš Fabiš	0	1	1
Own goals					2	0	0
Totals					26	6	32
