= List of Slovak football transfers winter 2020–21 =

Notable Slovak football transfers in the winter transfer window 2020–21 by club. Only transfers of the Fortuna Liga and 2. liga are included.

== Fortuna Liga ==
=== ŠK Slovan Bratislava ===
In: Note: Flags indicate national team as defined under FIFA eligibility rules; some limited exceptions apply. Players may hold more than one non-FIFA nationality.

| No. | Pos. | Nation | Player |

Out: Note: Flags indicate national team as defined under FIFA eligibility rules; some limited exceptions apply. Players may hold more than one non-FIFA nationality.

| No. | Pos. | Nation | Player |
|---|---|---|---|
| — | FW | (Slovenia) SVN | Žan Medved (on loan to (Poland) Wisła Kraków) |
| — | FW | (Montenegro) MNE | Boris Cmiljanić (to (Bosnia and Herzegovina) FK Sarajevo) |
| — | DF | (Ukraine) UKR | Artem Sukhotskyi (to (Ukraine) FC Desna Chernihiv) |

=== MŠK Žilina ===
In: Note: Flags indicate national team as defined under FIFA eligibility rules; some limited exceptions apply. Players may hold more than one non-FIFA nationality.

| No. | Pos. | Nation | Player |

Out: Note: Flags indicate national team as defined under FIFA eligibility rules; some limited exceptions apply. Players may hold more than one non-FIFA nationality.

| No. | Pos. | Nation | Player |

=== FC DAC 1904 Dunajská Streda ===
In: Note: Flags indicate national team as defined under FIFA eligibility rules; some limited exceptions apply. Players may hold more than one non-FIFA nationality.

| No. | Pos. | Nation | Player |
|---|---|---|---|
| 15 | MF | (United States) USA | Creighton Braun (from (United States) West Coast FC) |
| — | MF | (Wales) WAL | Isaac Christie-Davies (on loan from (England) Barnsley F.C.) |
| — | MF | (Brazil) BRA | Mateu Brunetti (from (Brazil) Figueirense FC) |
| — | FW | (Germany) GER | Brahim Moumou (from FC ŠTK 1914 Šamorín) |

Out: Note: Flags indicate national team as defined under FIFA eligibility rules; some limited exceptions apply. Players may hold more than one non-FIFA nationality.

| No. | Pos. | Nation | Player |
|---|---|---|---|
| 10 | MF | (Slovakia) SVK | Andrej Fábry (on loan to Sereď) |

=== FC Spartak Trnava ===
In: Note: Flags indicate national team as defined under FIFA eligibility rules; some limited exceptions apply. Players may hold more than one non-FIFA nationality.

| No. | Pos. | Nation | Player |
|---|---|---|---|
| 5 | DF | (Slovenia) SVN | Dejan Trajkovski (Free Agent) |
| 7 | FW | (North Macedonia) MKD | Milan Ristovski (on loan from (Croatia) Rijeka) |
| 19 | MF | (Spain) ESP | Dani Iglesias (on loan from (Croatia) Rijeka) |
| 23 | DF | (Czech Republic) CZE | Filip Twardzik (from (Czech Republic) MFK Karviná) |
| 24 | DF | (Slovakia) SVK | Kristián Koštrna (Free Agent) |

Out: Note: Flags indicate national team as defined under FIFA eligibility rules; some limited exceptions apply. Players may hold more than one non-FIFA nationality.

| No. | Pos. | Nation | Player |
|---|---|---|---|
| 4 | DF | (Slovakia) SVK | Marek Václav (Released and joined FC Košice) |
| 7 | FW | (Slovakia) SVK | Erik Pačinda (to FC Košice) |
| 12 | DF | (Slovakia) SVK | Mário Mihál (on loan to FC Petržalka) |
| 16 | DF | (Iceland) ISL | Birkir Valur Jónsson (loan return to (Iceland) HK) |
| 23 | DF | (Greece) GRE | Dimitris Konstantinidis (Released and joined (Cyprus) Olympiakos Nicosia) |
| — | MF | (Slovakia) SVK | Tomáš Hambálek (to FC Nitra) |

=== MFK Zemplín Michalovce ===
In: Note: Flags indicate national team as defined under FIFA eligibility rules; some limited exceptions apply. Players may hold more than one non-FIFA nationality.

| No. | Pos. | Nation | Player |

Out: Note: Flags indicate national team as defined under FIFA eligibility rules; some limited exceptions apply. Players may hold more than one non-FIFA nationality.

| No. | Pos. | Nation | Player |
|---|---|---|---|
| 88 | FW | (Slovakia) SVK | Adam Griger (to (Austria) LASK) |

=== MFK Ružomberok ===
In: Note: Flags indicate national team as defined under FIFA eligibility rules; some limited exceptions apply. Players may hold more than one non-FIFA nationality.

| No. | Pos. | Nation | Player |
|---|---|---|---|
| — | MF | (Slovakia) SVK | Oliver Luterán (from FK Poprad) |

Out: Note: Flags indicate national team as defined under FIFA eligibility rules; some limited exceptions apply. Players may hold more than one non-FIFA nationality.

| No. | Pos. | Nation | Player |
|---|---|---|---|
| — | MF | (Slovakia) SVK | Matúš Kmeť (to AS Trenčín) |
| 33 | GK | (Slovakia) SVK | Matúš Macík (to (Czech Republic) SK Sigma Olomouc) |
| — | FW | (Slovakia) SVK | Ladislav Almási (on loan to (Russia) Akhmat Grozny) |

=== AS Trenčín ===
In: Note: Flags indicate national team as defined under FIFA eligibility rules; some limited exceptions apply. Players may hold more than one non-FIFA nationality.

| No. | Pos. | Nation | Player |
|---|---|---|---|
| — | MF | (Slovakia) SVK | Matúš Kmeť (from MFK Ružomberok) |
| — | MF | (Slovakia) SVK | Samuel Lavrinčík (from Slovan B) |
| — | DF | (Brazil) BRA | Ramón Rodríguez da Silva (from Free Agent) |

Out: Note: Flags indicate national team as defined under FIFA eligibility rules; some limited exceptions apply. Players may hold more than one non-FIFA nationality.

| No. | Pos. | Nation | Player |
|---|---|---|---|
| — | FW | (Slovakia) SVK | David Depetris (Released) |
| — | DF | (Slovakia) SVK | Marián Pišoja (Released) |

=== FC ViOn Zlaté Moravce ===
In: Note: Flags indicate national team as defined under FIFA eligibility rules; some limited exceptions apply. Players may hold more than one non-FIFA nationality.

| No. | Pos. | Nation | Player |

Out: Note: Flags indicate national team as defined under FIFA eligibility rules; some limited exceptions apply. Players may hold more than one non-FIFA nationality.

| No. | Pos. | Nation | Player |

=== ŠKF Sereď ===
In: Note: Flags indicate national team as defined under FIFA eligibility rules; some limited exceptions apply. Players may hold more than one non-FIFA nationality.

| No. | Pos. | Nation | Player |
|---|---|---|---|
| — | MF | (Czech Republic) CZE | Ondřej Machuča (from (Czech Republic) FK Baník Sokolov) |
| — | MF | (Slovakia) SVK | Stanislav Danko (from Free Agent) |
| 10 | MF | (Slovakia) SVK | Andrej Fábry (on loan from D.Streda) |

Out: Note: Flags indicate national team as defined under FIFA eligibility rules; some limited exceptions apply. Players may hold more than one non-FIFA nationality.

| No. | Pos. | Nation | Player |
|---|---|---|---|
| — | DF | (Uruguay) URU | Álvaro Pereira (Released) |
| — | FW | (Colombia) COL | Carlos Ibargüen (Released) |
| - | DF | (Senegal) SEN | Tidiane Djiby Ba (to FC Nitra) |

=== FK Pohronie ===
In: Note: Flags indicate national team as defined under FIFA eligibility rules; some limited exceptions apply. Players may hold more than one non-FIFA nationality.

| No. | Pos. | Nation | Player |
|---|---|---|---|
| — | GK | (Slovakia) SVK | Libor Hrdlička (from (Czech Republic) MFK Karviná) |
| — | FW | (Switzerland) SUI | Adler Da Silva (from Free Agent) |
| — | DF | (France) FRA | Thomas Heurtaux (from Free Agent) |
| — | DF | (Ivory Coast) CIV | Willie Britto (on loan from (Switzerland) FC Zürich) |

Out: Note: Flags indicate national team as defined under FIFA eligibility rules; some limited exceptions apply. Players may hold more than one non-FIFA nationality.

| No. | Pos. | Nation | Player |
|---|---|---|---|
| — | MF | (Slovakia) SVK | Patrik Abrahám (to KFC Komárno) |

=== FK Senica ===
In: Note: Flags indicate national team as defined under FIFA eligibility rules; some limited exceptions apply. Players may hold more than one non-FIFA nationality.

| No. | Pos. | Nation | Player |
|---|---|---|---|
| — | MF | (Slovakia) SVK | Boris Turčák (from FC Petržalka) |
| - | MF | (Slovakia) SVK | Gabriel Hornyák (on loan from ŠK Slovan Bratislava) |
| - | MF | (Slovakia) SVK | Dávid Guba (from (Czech Republic) MFK Karviná) |
| - | MF | (Croatia) CRO | Marin Ljubičić (from Free Agent) |

Out: Note: Flags indicate national team as defined under FIFA eligibility rules; some limited exceptions apply. Players may hold more than one non-FIFA nationality.

| No. | Pos. | Nation | Player |

=== FC Nitra ===
In: Note: Flags indicate national team as defined under FIFA eligibility rules; some limited exceptions apply. Players may hold more than one non-FIFA nationality.

| No. | Pos. | Nation | Player |
|---|---|---|---|
| - | MF | (Slovakia) SVK | Tomáš Hambálek (from FC Spartak Trnava) |
| - | DF | (Germany) GER | Yanni Regäsel (from Free Agent) |
| - | FW | (Slovakia) SVK | Erik Jendrišek (from (Greece) Volos F.C.) |
| - | MF | (Germany) GER | Sinan Kurt (from (Germany) SV 19 Straelen) |
| - | DF | (Germany) GER | Ramzi Ferjani (from Free Agent) |
| - | DF | (Senegal) SEN | Tidiane Djiby Ba (from ŠKF Sereď) |
| - | MF | (Germany) GER | Oliver Bias (from Free Agent) |
| - | MF | (Germany) GER | Ole Käuper (on loan from (Germany) Werder Bremen) |
| - | FW | (Switzerland) SUI | Kilian Pagliuca (from (Germany) Carl Zeiss Jena) |
| - | FW | (Kosovo) KOS | Eroll Zejnullahu (from (Germany) Carl Zeiss Jena) |

Out: Note: Flags indicate national team as defined under FIFA eligibility rules; some limited exceptions apply. Players may hold more than one non-FIFA nationality.

| No. | Pos. | Nation | Player |
|---|---|---|---|
| — | MF | (Slovakia) SVK | Michal Faško (Released and joined (Czech Republic) FC Slovan Liberec) |
| — | MF | (Croatia) CRO | Nikola Gatarić (Released and joined (Cyprus) Ermis Aradippou FC) |
| — | DF | (Slovakia) SVK | Matúš Kuník (Released) |
| — | DF | (Slovakia) SVK | Timotej Záhumenský (Released) |
| — | MF | (Slovakia) SVK | Marián Chobot (Released) |
| — | DF | (Slovakia) SVK | Daniel Magda (Released) |
| — | FW | (Slovakia) SVK | Samuel Šefčík (Released) |
| — | MF | (Italy) ITA | Matteo Olivero (Released) |
| — | MF | (Slovakia) SVK | Oliver Podhorín (Released and joined (Poland) Resovia Rzeszów) |
| — | Gk | (Israel) ISR | Ariel Harush (to (Netherlands) SC Heerenveen) |

== 2. liga ==
=== FK Dubnica ===
In: Note: Flags indicate national team as defined under FIFA eligibility rules; some limited exceptions apply. Players may hold more than one non-FIFA nationality.

| No. | Pos. | Nation | Player |

Out: Note: Flags indicate national team as defined under FIFA eligibility rules; some limited exceptions apply. Players may hold more than one non-FIFA nationality.

| No. | Pos. | Nation | Player |

=== MFK Dukla Banská Bystrica ===
In: Note: Flags indicate national team as defined under FIFA eligibility rules; some limited exceptions apply. Players may hold more than one non-FIFA nationality.

| No. | Pos. | Nation | Player |

Out: Note: Flags indicate national team as defined under FIFA eligibility rules; some limited exceptions apply. Players may hold more than one non-FIFA nationality.

| No. | Pos. | Nation | Player |

=== MFK Skalica ===
In: Note: Flags indicate national team as defined under FIFA eligibility rules; some limited exceptions apply. Players may hold more than one non-FIFA nationality.

| No. | Pos. | Nation | Player |

Out: Note: Flags indicate national team as defined under FIFA eligibility rules; some limited exceptions apply. Players may hold more than one non-FIFA nationality.

| No. | Pos. | Nation | Player |

=== FK Železiarne Podbrezová ===
In: Note: Flags indicate national team as defined under FIFA eligibility rules; some limited exceptions apply. Players may hold more than one non-FIFA nationality.

| No. | Pos. | Nation | Player |

Out: Note: Flags indicate national team as defined under FIFA eligibility rules; some limited exceptions apply. Players may hold more than one non-FIFA nationality.

| No. | Pos. | Nation | Player |

=== MŠK Žilina B ===
In: Note: Flags indicate national team as defined under FIFA eligibility rules; some limited exceptions apply. Players may hold more than one non-FIFA nationality.

| No. | Pos. | Nation | Player |

Out: Note: Flags indicate national team as defined under FIFA eligibility rules; some limited exceptions apply. Players may hold more than one non-FIFA nationality.

| No. | Pos. | Nation | Player |

=== FK Poprad ===
In: Note: Flags indicate national team as defined under FIFA eligibility rules; some limited exceptions apply. Players may hold more than one non-FIFA nationality.

| No. | Pos. | Nation | Player |

Out: Note: Flags indicate national team as defined under FIFA eligibility rules; some limited exceptions apply. Players may hold more than one non-FIFA nationality.

| No. | Pos. | Nation | Player |
|---|---|---|---|
| 10 | MF | (Slovakia) SVK | Oliver Luterán (to MFK Ružomberok) |

=== MFK Tatran Liptovský Mikuláš ===
In: Note: Flags indicate national team as defined under FIFA eligibility rules; some limited exceptions apply. Players may hold more than one non-FIFA nationality.

| No. | Pos. | Nation | Player |

Out: Note: Flags indicate national team as defined under FIFA eligibility rules; some limited exceptions apply. Players may hold more than one non-FIFA nationality.

| No. | Pos. | Nation | Player |

=== MŠK Púchov ===
In: Note: Flags indicate national team as defined under FIFA eligibility rules; some limited exceptions apply. Players may hold more than one non-FIFA nationality.

| No. | Pos. | Nation | Player |

Out: Note: Flags indicate national team as defined under FIFA eligibility rules; some limited exceptions apply. Players may hold more than one non-FIFA nationality.

| No. | Pos. | Nation | Player |

=== Partizán Bardejov ===
In: Note: Flags indicate national team as defined under FIFA eligibility rules; some limited exceptions apply. Players may hold more than one non-FIFA nationality.

| No. | Pos. | Nation | Player |

Out: Note: Flags indicate national team as defined under FIFA eligibility rules; some limited exceptions apply. Players may hold more than one non-FIFA nationality.

| No. | Pos. | Nation | Player |

=== FC ŠTK 1914 Šamorín ===
In: Note: Flags indicate national team as defined under FIFA eligibility rules; some limited exceptions apply. Players may hold more than one non-FIFA nationality.

| No. | Pos. | Nation | Player |

Out: Note: Flags indicate national team as defined under FIFA eligibility rules; some limited exceptions apply. Players may hold more than one non-FIFA nationality.

| No. | Pos. | Nation | Player |

=== FC Košice ===
In: Note: Flags indicate national team as defined under FIFA eligibility rules; some limited exceptions apply. Players may hold more than one non-FIFA nationality.

| No. | Pos. | Nation | Player |
|---|---|---|---|
| — | FW | (Slovakia) SVK | Erik Pačinda (from FC Spartak Trnava) |
| — | DF | (Slovakia) SVK | Marek Václav (from FC Spartak Trnava) |

Out: Note: Flags indicate national team as defined under FIFA eligibility rules; some limited exceptions apply. Players may hold more than one non-FIFA nationality.

| No. | Pos. | Nation | Player |
|---|---|---|---|
| — | FW | (England) ENG | Samuel George Ford (Released) |
| — | MF | (Ukraine) UKR | Maksym Rizie (Released) |
| — | FW | (Ukraine) UKR | Oleg Vyshnevskyi (Released) |
| — | FW | (Serbia) SRB | Predrag Radovanović (Released) |
| — | FW | (Colombia) COL | Robinson Blandón Rendón (Released) |
| — | MF | (Slovakia) SVK | Jozef-Šimon Turík (Released) |
| — | GK | (Slovakia) SVK | Jakub Giertl (Retired) |

=== KFC Komárno ===
In: Note: Flags indicate national team as defined under FIFA eligibility rules; some limited exceptions apply. Players may hold more than one non-FIFA nationality.

| No. | Pos. | Nation | Player |
|---|---|---|---|
| — | MF | (Slovakia) SVK | Patrik Abrahám (from FK Pohronie) |

Out: Note: Flags indicate national team as defined under FIFA eligibility rules; some limited exceptions apply. Players may hold more than one non-FIFA nationality.

| No. | Pos. | Nation | Player |

=== FC Petržalka ===
In: Note: Flags indicate national team as defined under FIFA eligibility rules; some limited exceptions apply. Players may hold more than one non-FIFA nationality.

| No. | Pos. | Nation | Player |
|---|---|---|---|
| — | DF | (Slovakia) SVK | Pavol Farkaš (from Spartak Myjava) |

Out: Note: Flags indicate national team as defined under FIFA eligibility rules; some limited exceptions apply. Players may hold more than one non-FIFA nationality.

| No. | Pos. | Nation | Player |
|---|---|---|---|
| — | MF | (Slovakia) SVK | Boris Turčák (to FK Senica) |

=== ŠK Slovan Bratislava B ===
In: Note: Flags indicate national team as defined under FIFA eligibility rules; some limited exceptions apply. Players may hold more than one non-FIFA nationality.

| No. | Pos. | Nation | Player |

Out: Note: Flags indicate national team as defined under FIFA eligibility rules; some limited exceptions apply. Players may hold more than one non-FIFA nationality.

| No. | Pos. | Nation | Player |
|---|---|---|---|
| — | MF | (Slovakia) SVK | Samuel Lavrinčík (to AS Trenčín) |
| - | MF | (Slovakia) SVK | Gabriel Hornyák (on loan to FK Senica) |

=== FK Slavoj Trebišov ===
In: Note: Flags indicate national team as defined under FIFA eligibility rules; some limited exceptions apply. Players may hold more than one non-FIFA nationality.

| No. | Pos. | Nation | Player |

Out: Note: Flags indicate national team as defined under FIFA eligibility rules; some limited exceptions apply. Players may hold more than one non-FIFA nationality.

| No. | Pos. | Nation | Player |
