= List of German football transfers winter 2015–16 =

This is a list of German football transfers in the winter transfer window 2015–16 by club. Only transfers of the Bundesliga, and 2. Bundesliga are included.

== Bundesliga ==
Note: Flags indicate national team as has been defined under FIFA eligibility rules. Players may hold more than one non-FIFA nationality.

=== FC Bayern Munich ===
In:

No.	Pos.	Nation	Player
4	DF	GER	Serdar Tasci (on loan from Spartak Moscow)

Out:

No.	Pos.	Nation	Player
15	DF	GER	Jan Kirchhoff (to Sunderland)
16	MF	GER	Gianluca Gaudino (on loan to FC St. Gallen)
24	FW	GER	Sinan Kurt (to Hertha BSC)

=== VfL Wolfsburg ===
In:

No.	Pos.	Nation	Player
16	FW	BRA	Bruno Henrique (from Goiás)

Out:

No.	Pos.	Nation	Player
5	DF	SUI	Timm Klose (to Norwich City)
19	FW	POL	Oskar Zawada (on loan to FC Twente)
35	MF	SUI	Francisco Rodríguez Araya (on loan to Arminia Bielefeld)

=== Borussia Mönchengladbach ===
In:

No.	Pos.	Nation	Player
5	DF	AUT	Martin Hinteregger (on loan from Red Bull Salzburg)
23	MF	GER	Jonas Hofmann (from Borussia Dortmund)

Out:

No.	Pos.	Nation	Player

=== Bayer 04 Leverkusen ===
In:

No.	Pos.	Nation	Player
27	MF	AUS	Robbie Kruse (loan return from VfB Stuttgart)

Out:

No.	Pos.	Nation	Player
24	MF	KOR	Ryu Seung-woo (on loan to Arminia Bielefeld)
26	DF	ITA	Giulio Donati (to Mainz 05)

=== FC Augsburg ===
In:

No.	Pos.	Nation	Player
6	DF	NED	Jeffrey Gouweleeuw (from AZ Alkmaar)
17	FW	ALB	Albian Ajeti (from FC Basel)
27	FW	ISL	Alfreð Finnbogason (on loan from Real Sociedad)

Out:

No.	Pos.	Nation	Player
23	FW	SVN	Tim Matavž (on loan to Genoa C.F.C.)
33	FW	GER	Sascha Mölders (on loan to TSV 1860 München)
34	FW	SRB	Nikola Đurđić (on loan to Fortuna Düsseldorf)

=== FC Schalke 04 ===
In:

No.	Pos.	Nation	Player
11	MF	MAR	Younès Belhanda (on loan from Dynamo Kyiv)
21	MF	AUT	Alessandro Schöpf (from 1. FC Nürnberg)
—	FW	GER	Felix Schröter (loan return from 1. FC Heidenheim)

Out:

No.	Pos.	Nation	Player
5	DF	BRA	Felipe Santana (to Kuban Krasnodar)
24	DF	TUR	Kaan Ayhan (on loan to Eintracht Frankfurt)
36	FW	GER	Felix Platte (on loan to SV Darmstadt 98)
—	FW	GHA	Kevin-Prince Boateng (to AC Milan)

=== Borussia Dortmund ===
In:

No.	Pos.	Nation	Player

Out:

No.	Pos.	Nation	Player
7	MF	GER	Jonas Hofmann (to Borussia Mönchengladbach)
9	MF	BEL	Adnan Januzaj (loan return to Manchester United)
35	MF	GER	Pascal Stenzel (on loan to SC Freiburg)

=== 1899 Hoffenheim ===
In:

No.	Pos.	Nation	Player
27	FW	CRO	Andrej Kramarić (on loan from Leicester City)

Out:

No.	Pos.	Nation	Player
28	FW	HUN	Ádám Szalai (on loan to Hannover 96)
21	DF	GER	Nicolai Rapp (on loan to SpVgg Greuther Fürth)
—	MF	BRA	Guilherme Biteco (on loan to Ceará Sporting Club)
—	MF	BRA	Bruno Nazário (on loan to Cruzeiro Esporte Clube)
—	FW	SRB	Filip Malbašić (to FK Vojvodina)

=== Eintracht Frankfurt ===
In:

No.	Pos.	Nation	Player
2	DF	GER	Yanni Regäsel (from Hertha BSC)
3	DF	TUR	Kaan Ayhan (on loan from Schalke 04)
8	MF	HUN	Szabolcs Huszti (from Changchun Yatai)
10	MF	MEX	Marco Fabián (from C.D. Guadalajara)
32	MF	TUN	Änis Ben-Hatira (from Hertha BSC)

Out:

No.	Pos.	Nation	Player
10	FW	CZE	Václav Kadlec (to FC Midtjylland)
31	DF	GER	David Kinsombi (to Karlsruher SC, then on loan to 1. FC Magdeburg)
32	MF	GER	Joel Gerezgiher (on loan to FSV Frankfurt)

=== Werder Bremen ===
In:

No.	Pos.	Nation	Player
3	DF	SEN	Papy Djilobodji (on loan from Chelsea)
5	MF	MLI	Sambou Yatabaré (from Olympiacos, previously on loan to Standard Liège)
6	MF	HUN	László Kleinheisler (from Videoton FC)
13	DF	SRB	Miloš Veljković (from Tottenham Hotspur)
18	GK	GER	Gerhard Tremmel (on loan from Swansea City)

Out:

No.	Pos.	Nation	Player
5	DF	COD	Assani Lukimya-Mulongoti (to Liaoning Whowin)
10	MF	GER	Levent Ayçiçek (on loan to TSV 1860 München)
18	MF	GER	Felix Kroos (on loan to 1. FC Union Berlin)

=== 1. FSV Mainz 05 ===
In:

No.	Pos.	Nation	Player
2	DF	ITA	Giulio Donati (from Bayer Leverkusen)
11	FW	DEN	Emil Berggreen (from Eintracht Braunschweig)
21	FW	AUT	Karim Onisiwo (from SV Mattersburg)

Out:

No.	Pos.	Nation	Player
2	DF	CHI	Gonzalo Jara (to Universidad de Chile)
11	FW	GER	Maximilian Beister (on loan to 1860 Munich)
25	MF	DEN	Niki Zimling (on loan to FSV Frankfurt)
28	MF	BUL	Todor Nedelev (on loan to Botev Plovdiv)
31	FW	GER	Florian Niederlechner (on loan to SC Freiburg)

=== 1. FC Köln ===
In:

No.	Pos.	Nation	Player
25	DF	SRB	Filip Mladenović (from BATE Borisov)

Out:

No.	Pos.	Nation	Player
21	DF	BRA	Pedro Geromel (to Grêmio, previously on loan)
25	MF	JPN	Kazuki Nagasawa (to Urawa Red Diamonds, then on loan to JEF United Ichihara Chiba)
26	FW	NOR	Bård Finne (to 1. FC Heidenheim)

=== Hannover 96 ===
In:

No.	Pos.	Nation	Player
16	MF	JPN	Hotaru Yamaguchi (from Cerezo Osaka)
18	MF	NOR	Iver Fossum (from Strømsgodset Toppfotball)
21	FW	GER	Marius Wolf (from 1860 Munich)
22	FW	POR	Hugo Almeida (from Anzhi Makhachkala)
24	DF	SWE	Alexander Milošević (on loan from Beşiktaş J.K.)
28	FW	HUN	Ádám Szalai (on loan from 1899 Hoffenheim)

Out:

No.	Pos.	Nation	Player
23	MF	GER	Maurice Hirsch (on loan to SpVgg Greuther Fürth)
25	DF	BRA	Marcelo (on loan to Beşiktaş J.K.)
31	MF	GER	Sebastian Ernst (to 1. FC Magdeburg)
33	DF	GER	Mike-Steven Bähre (on loan to Hallescher FC)
37	DF	GER	Niklas Teichgräber (on loan to VfV Hildesheim)
39	FW	TUR	Mevlüt Erdinç (on loan to EA Guingamp)

=== VfB Stuttgart ===
In:

No.	Pos.	Nation	Player
15	MF	GER	Kevin Großkreutz (from Galatasaray)
23	FW	UKR	Artem Kravets (on loan from Dynamo Kyiv)
24	DF	ITA	Federico Barba (on loan from Empoli)

Out:

No.	Pos.	Nation	Player
9	MF	AUS	Robbie Kruse (loan return to Bayer 04 Leverkusen)
11	MF	ECU	Carlos Gruezo (to FC Dallas)
17	GK	GER	Odisseas Vlachodimos (to Panathinaikos)
21	MF	CZE	Adam Hloušek (to Legia Warsaw)

=== Hertha BSC ===
In:

No.	Pos.	Nation	Player
18	MF	GER	Sinan Kurt (from Bayern Munich)

Out:

No.	Pos.	Nation	Player
10	MF	TUN	Änis Ben-Hatira (to Eintracht Frankfurt)
35	GK	GER	Marius Gersbeck (on loan to Chemnitzer FC)
39	DF	GER	Yanni Regäsel (to Eintracht Frankfurt)

=== Hamburger SV ===
In:

No.	Pos.	Nation	Player
19	FW	SUI	Josip Drmić (on loan from Borussia Mönchengladbach)
21	MF	SWE	Nabil Bahoui (from Al-Ahli)

Out:

No.	Pos.	Nation	Player
17	MF	HUN	Zoltán Stieber (on loan to 1. FC Nürnberg)
21	MF	CHI	Marcelo Díaz (to Celta de Vigo)
31	DF	MOZ	Ronny Marcos (to SpVgg Greuther Fürth)

=== FC Ingolstadt 04 ===
In:

No.	Pos.	Nation	Player
37	FW	PAR	Dario Lezcano (from Luzern)

Out:

No.	Pos.	Nation	Player
11	FW	CZE	Tomáš Pekhart (to AEK Athens)
22	MF	GER	Stefan Wannenwetsch (to Hansa Rostock)
30	MF	GER	Thomas Pledl (on loan to SV Sandhausen)

=== SV Darmstadt 98 ===
In:

No.	Pos.	Nation	Player
19	FW	GER	Felix Platte (on loan from FC Schalke)

Out:

No.	Pos.	Nation	Player

== 2. Bundesliga ==
=== SC Freiburg ===
In:

No.	Pos.	Nation	Player
7	FW	GER	Florian Niederlechner (on loan from Mainz 05)
14	FW	NOR	Håvard Nielsen (from Red Bull Salzburg)
15	MF	GER	Pascal Stenzel (on loan from Borussia Dortmund)

Out:

No.	Pos.	Nation	Player
9	FW	AUT	Philipp Zulechner (to Young Boys)

=== SC Paderborn 07 ===
In:

No.	Pos.	Nation	Player
4	DF	GER	Tim Sebastian (from RB Leipzig)
8	FW	DEN	Nicklas Helenius (on loan from AaB)
33	FW	SVK	Jakub Sylvestr (on loan from 1. FC Nürnberg)
34	MF	GER	Robin Krauße (from Carl Zeiss Jena)

Out:

No.	Pos.	Nation	Player
8	FW	GER	Nick Proschwitz (to Sint-Truidense)
21	MF	GER	Daniel Brückner (released)

=== Karlsruher SC ===
In:

No.	Pos.	Nation	Player
—	DF	GER	David Kinsombi (from Eintracht Frankfurt)

Out:

No.	Pos.	Nation	Player
6	DF	GER	Jan Mauersberger (to 1860 Munich)
27	FW	GER	Pascal Köpke (on loan to Erzgebirge Aue)
34	DF	GER	Tim Grupp (on loan to SpVgg Neckarelz)
—	DF	GER	David Kinsombi (on loan to 1. FC Magdeburg)

=== 1. FC Kaiserslautern ===
In:

No.	Pos.	Nation	Player
15	FW	ISL	Jón Daði Böðvarsson (from Viking FK)

Out:

No.	Pos.	Nation	Player

=== RB Leipzig ===
In:

No.	Pos.	Nation	Player

Out:

No.	Pos.	Nation	Player
8	DF	GER	Tim Sebastian (to SC Paderborn)
19	MF	HUN	Zsolt Kalmár (on loan to FSV Frankfurt)

=== Eintracht Braunschweig ===
In:

No.	Pos.	Nation	Player
7	FW	COD	Domi Kumbela (from SpVgg Greuther Fürth)

Out:

No.	Pos.	Nation	Player
9	FW	DEN	Emil Berggreen (to Mainz 05)
23	FW	DEN	Mads Dittmer Hvilsom (on loan to SK Brann)

=== 1. FC Union Berlin ===
In:

No.	Pos.	Nation	Player
3	DF	AUT	Emanuel Pogatetz (from Columbus Crew)
12	GK	DEN	Jakob Busk (from F.C. Copenhagen, previously on loan to Sandefjord Fotball)
23	MF	GER	Felix Kroos (on loan from SV Werder Bremen)

Out:

No.	Pos.	Nation	Player
6	DF	UKR	Denis Prychynenko (released)
33	FW	KOS	Bajram Nebihi (released)

=== 1. FC Heidenheim ===
In:

No.	Pos.	Nation	Player
10	FW	NOR	Bård Finne (from 1. FC Köln)
11	FW	GER	Denis Thomalla (on loan from Lech Poznań)

Out:

No.	Pos.	Nation	Player
2	MF	GER	Sebastian Heidinger (to SpVgg Greuther Fürth)
11	FW	GER	Daniel Frahn (to Chemnitzer FC)
17	FW	GER	Andreas Voglsammer (to Arminia Bielefeld)
20	FW	GER	Felix Schröter (loan return to FC Schalke 04)
39	FW	GER	Adriano Grimaldi (to Preußen Münster)
—	MF	GER	Dave Gnaase (on loan to SpVgg Neckarelz)

=== 1. FC Nürnberg ===
In:

No.	Pos.	Nation	Player
16	MF	HUN	Zoltán Stieber (on loan from Hamburger SV)

Out:

No.	Pos.	Nation	Player
10	MF	GER	Timo Gebhart (to Steaua București)
11	FW	SVK	Jakub Sylvestr (on loan to SC Paderborn)
20	FW	GER	Stefan Kutschke (on loan to Dynamo Dresden)
21	MF	GER	Willi Evseev (on loan to Holstein Kiel)
28	MF	AUT	Alessandro Schöpf (to Schalke 04)

=== Fortuna Düsseldorf ===
In:

No.	Pos.	Nation	Player
35	MF	GRE	Charalampos Mavrias (on loan from Sunderland)
—	MF	JPN	Justin Toshiki Kinjo (from 1860 Munich U19)
—	FW	SRB	Nikola Đurđić (on loan from FC Augsburg)

Out:

No.	Pos.	Nation	Player
9	FW	NED	Mike van Duinen (on loan to Roda JC Kerkrade)
35	DF	GER	Fabian Holthaus (on loan to Dynamo Dresden)

=== VfL Bochum ===
In:

No.	Pos.	Nation	Player

Out:

No.	Pos.	Nation	Player
39	MF	NOR	Henrik Gulden (released)

=== SV Sandhausen ===
In:

No.	Pos.	Nation	Player
—	MF	GER	Thomas Pledl (on loan from FC Ingolstadt)
—	MF	GER	Korbinian Vollmann (from 1860 Munich)

Out:

No.	Pos.	Nation	Player
2	DF	GER	Nico Hammann (to 1. FC Magdeburg)

=== FSV Frankfurt ===
In:

No.	Pos.	Nation	Player
4	DF	BRA	Gabriel Silva (free transfer)
13	MF	HUN	Zsolt Kalmár (on loan from RB Leipzig)
14	MF	DEN	Niki Zimling (on loan from Mainz 05)
17	MF	GER	Joel Gerezgiher (on loan from Eintracht Frankfurt)

Out:

No.	Pos.	Nation	Player
14	DF	GER	Alexander Bittroff (to Chemnitzer FC)
17	DF	LBN	Joan Oumari (to Sivasspor)
22	MF	GER	Timm Golley (on loan to SV Wehen Wiesbaden)
31	MF	GER	Leon Hammel (on loan to TuS Erndtebrück)
32	DF	GER	Florijon Belegu (to Berliner AK 07)

=== SpVgg Greuther Fürth ===
In:

No.	Pos.	Nation	Player
27	DF	MOZ	Ronny Marcos (from Hamburger SV)
—	MF	GER	Maurice Hirsch (on loan from Hannover 96)
—	MF	GER	Sebastian Heidinger (from 1. FC Heidenheim)
—	FW	CRO	Ante Vukušić (from Pescara)
—	MF	SUI	Roberto Rodríguez (from Novara)
—	DF	GER	Nicolai Rapp (on loan from 1899 Hoffenheim)

Out:

No.	Pos.	Nation	Player
3	DF	HUN	Zsolt Korcsmár (to Vasas SC)
4	DF	GER	Stefan Thesker (on loan to FC Twente)
10	DF	PHI	Stephan Schröck (on loan to Ceres)
11	MF	GER	Florian Trinks (to Ferencváros)
16	MF	SVN	Goran Šukalo (to 1860 Munich)
18	FW	COD	Domi Kumbela (to Eintracht Braunschweig)
35	MF	LUX	Dwayn Holter (to CS Fola Esch)

=== FC St. Pauli ===
In:

No.	Pos.	Nation	Player

Out:

No.	Pos.	Nation	Player

=== 1860 Munich ===
In:

No.	Pos.	Nation	Player
13	FW	GER	Sascha Mölders (on loan from FC Augsburg)
23	FW	GER	Maximilian Beister (on loan from Mainz 05)
2	DF	GER	Jan Mauersberger (from Karlsruher SC)
33	MF	GER	Levent Ayçiçek (on loan from SV Werder Bremen)
15	MF	SVN	Goran Šukalo (from SpVgg Greuther Fürth)

Out:

No.	Pos.	Nation	Player
27	FW	GER	Marius Wolf (to Hannover 96)
33	MF	GER	Korbinian Vollmann (to SV Sandhausen)
34	FW	SRB	Fejsal Mulić (released)
35	MF	GER	Emanuel Taffertshofer (to Würzburger Kickers)
36	FW	GER	Stephane Mvibudulu (to Stuttgarter Kickers)

=== Arminia Bielefeld ===
In:

No.	Pos.	Nation	Player
10	MF	KOR	Ryu Seung-woo (on loan from Bayer Leverkusen)
21	FW	GER	Andreas Voglsammer (from 1. FC Heidenheim)
22	MF	SUI	Francisco Rodríguez (on loan from VfL Wolfsburg)

Out:

No.	Pos.	Nation	Player
21	MF	SWE	Amin Affane (to AIK)
29	MF	GER	Samir Benamar (on loan to Rot-Weiß Erfurt)
36	MF	GER	Marco Hober (on loan to Borussia Dortmund II)
37	MF	GER	Christian Müller (to Vasas SC)
38	DF	GER	Jonas Strifler (to SV Waldhof Mannheim)

=== MSV Duisburg ===
In:

No.	Pos.	Nation	Player
7	FW	POR	Tomané (on loan from Vitória Guimarães)
38	MF	TUR	Barış Özbek (from Kayserispor)
39	GK	SEN	Timothy Dieng (from Grasshopper Zürich)

Out:

No.	Pos.	Nation	Player
7	DF	GEO	Lasha Dvali (released)

== See also ==
- 2015–16 Bundesliga
- 2015–16 2. Bundesliga
