= Iskra Partizánske =

- Slovak basketball club – TJ Iskra Partizánske
- Slovak ice hockey club – HK Iskra Partizánske
- Slovak handball club (renamed from Iskra Partizánske) – HK Slávia Partizánske
- Slovak football club (renamed from Iskra Partizánske) – FK Tempo Partizánske
