= Cléber (footballer, born 1986) =

Brazilian footballer

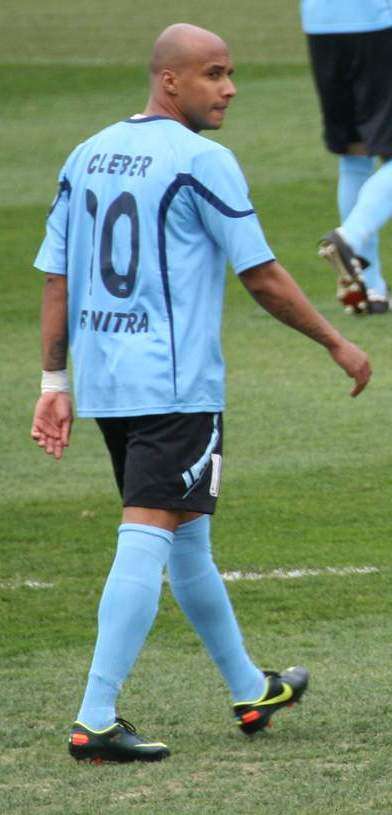

Personal information
- Full name: Cléber Nascimento da Silva
- Date of birth: 13 June 1986 (age 40)
- Place of birth: São Paulo, Brazil
- Height: 1.76 m (5 ft 9 in)
- Position: Winger

Team information
- Current team: Dynamo Malženice
- Number: 10

Senior career*
Years	Team	Apps	(Gls)
2006	São Carlos		
2006–2007	Mika Ashtarak		
2008	Petržalka	23	(4)
2009–2010	Slovácko	39	(3)
2011	Corinthians Alagoano	36	(11)
2012–2014	FC Nitra	65	(19)
2014–2016	Spartak Trnava	21	(5)
2016–2017	Slovan Bratislava	10	(0)
2017–2019	ViOn Zlaté Moravce	26	(2)
2019–2022	iClinic Sereď	17	(1)
2020–2021	→ Kalná nad Hronom (loan)	7	(3)
2021–2022	→ FC Nitra (loan)		
2022	Kalná nad Hronom		
2023–	Dynamo Malženice	1	(0)
- * Club domestic league appearances and goals as of 5 March 2023

Cléber Nascimento da Silva (born 13 June 1986), known as just Cléber, is a Brazilian footballer who plays as a winger for OFK Malženice.

== Club career ==
Cléber's European career began in Armenian club Mika. He played in UEFA Cup against Petržalka in the second round of 2007-2008 season. After these matches, Petržalka got interested in signing Cléber. In January 2008, he was transferred to Petržalka. The next club in his career was Czech club Slovácko. After this spell, Cléber left back to his native Brazil, where he spent two years.

In January 2012, he came to Nitra and signed a two-and-a-half-year contract.

He was signed by Spartak Trnava in August 2014. He made his league debut for them against ŽP Šport Podbrezová on 10 August 2014.

== Personal life ==
Cléber resides in Nitra, Slovakia.
