= Dávid Haspra =

Slovak footballer

Personal information
- Full name: Dávid Haspra
- Date of birth: 6 November 2000 (age 26)
- Place of birth: Zlaté Moravce, Slovakia
- Height: 1.81 m (5 ft 11 in)
- Position: Defender

Team information
- Current team: FK TJ Lokomotíva Kozárovce
- Number: 4

Youth career
- 2012–2014: OFK Tatran Topoľčianky
- 2014–2017: Nitra
- 2017–2019: ViOn Zlaté Moravce

Senior career*
| Years | Team | Apps | (Gls) |
| 2019–2022 | ViOn Zlaté Moravce | 15 | (0) |
| 2022 | Kalná nad Hronom | 9 | (0) |
| 2023– | FK TJ Lokomotíva Kozárovce | 26 | (1) |
- * Club domestic league appearances and goals as of 20:45, 23 January 2024 (UTC)

Dávid Haspra (born 6 November 2000) is a professional Slovak footballer who plays as a center-back.

== Club career ==
=== FC ViOn Zlaté Moravce ===
Haspra made his Fortuna Liga debut for ViOn Zlaté Moravce against Pohronie on 27 June 2020, during an away 0:1 defeat. Haspra was fielded in the starting line-up and played 90 minutes. He made two further appearances in two final subsequent rounds of the season.

At the start of the 2020–21 season, Haspra had extended his contract with ViOn by a year.
