= Martin Adamec =

Slovak footballer

Personal information
- Full name: Martin Adamec
- Date of birth: 14 August 1998 (age 28)
- Place of birth: Levice, Slovakia
- Height: 1.85 m (6 ft 1 in)
- Position: Midfielder

Team information
- Current team: Marsaxlokk
- Number: 20

Youth career
- 2005–2014: Senica
- 2014–2017: St. Pölten

Senior career*
Years	Team	Apps	(Gls)
2016–2018	St. Pölten II	39	(3)
2018–2020	Jagiellonia Białystok	8	(0)
2018	→ Wigry Suwałki (loan)	19	(6)
2019	→ Odra Opole (loan)	14	(1)
2020	→ Wigry Suwałki (loan)	4	(0)
2020	Nitra	16	(2)
2021	Pohronie	28	(0)
2022–2023	PDRM	18	(8)
2023	Dubnica nad Váhom	12	(0)
2023–2024	Komárno	21	(1)
2024	Nõmme United	17	(0)
2025–	Marsaxlokk	13	(0)

International career
2016–2017	Slovakia U19	8	(0)
2018	Slovakia U20	1	(0)
2019	Slovakia U21	8	(0)
- * Club domestic league appearances and goals as of 26 June 2025

Martin Adamec (born 14 August 1998) is a Slovak professional footballer who plays as a midfielder for Maltese Premier League club Marsaxlokk.

== Career ==
Adamec signed with Pohronie in early February 2021 mere two days before the resumption of the Fortuna Liga. He joined the side after resigning from Nitra following club's financial and internal issues.

On 9 July 2024, Adamec signed with Nõmme United of Esiliiga joining fellow national Jakub Luka in the club.
