= Jakub Sedláček (footballer) =

Slovak footballer

Personal information
- Full name: Jakub Sedláček
- Date of birth: 9 March 1998 (age 28)
- Place of birth: Trenčín, Slovakia
- Height: 1.87 m (6 ft 2 in)
- Position: Midfielder

Team information
- Current team: Slovan Galanta
- Number: 22

Youth career
- 2005–2012: TJ Slovan Dolná Súča
- 2012–2016: AS Trenčín
- 2017: Železiarne Podbrezová

Senior career*
Years	Team	Apps	(Gls)
2017–2019	Železiarne Podbrezová	16	(0)
2019	→ Pohronie (loan)	13	(2)
2019	Pohronie	13	(0)
2020	Újpest	2	(0)
2021	Partizán Bardejov	11	(0)
2021–2022	Nitra	26	(3)
2022	Humenné	16	(4)
2023	Dolný Kubín	11	(0)
2023–	Slovan Galanta	14	(2)

International career
2016	Slovakia U19	1	(0)
- * Club domestic league appearances and goals as of 16:18, 9 January 2024 (UTC)

Jakub Sedláček (born 9 March 1998) is a Slovak footballer who plays as a midfielder for Slovan Galanta.

== Club career ==
=== Železiarne Podbrezová ===
Sedláček made his Fortuna Liga debut for Železiarne Podbrezová against AS Trenčín on 3 November 2017. He made 16 league appearances for the club.

=== Pohronie ===
Sedláček initially signed for Pohronie on a half-season loan, during the winter of 2019. In 13 matches, he scored two goals, in the last two fixtures of the season, against Komárno and Fluminense Šamorín, thus securing Pohronie a title in the 2. Liga and subsequent promotion to Fortuna Liga. In the top division, Sedláček had completed 13 fixtures during half of the season. He was released with numerous other players in December 2019.

=== Újpest ===
Despite the fact that Pohronie had been at the bottom of the Fortuna Liga table, on 31 January 2020 it was announced that Sedláček had signed a 3,5 year deal with Újpest, competing in Hungarian NB I. Sedláček had acknowledged feeling of respect towards the move, considering the history and past successes of the club.
