= Matteo Olivero (footballer) =

Italian footballer

Personal information
- Full name: Matteo Olivero
- Date of birth: 29 July 2000 (age 26)
- Place of birth: Italy
- Height: 1.70 m (5 ft 7 in)
- Position: Winger

Youth career
- –2018: Nitra
- 2018–2019: Rayo Majadahonda
- 2019–2020: Pafos

Senior career*
Years	Team	Apps	(Gls)
2020	Pafos	0	(0)
2020	Nitra	1	(0)
- * Club domestic league appearances and goals as of 7 January 2021

Matteo Olivero (born 29 July 2000) is an Italian footballer who last played for Nitra as a winger.

== Club career ==
=== FC Nitra ===
Olivero made his Fortuna Liga debut for Nitra at pod Zoborom against Dunajská Streda on 21 November 2020. While featured in the starting-XI, he was replaced by Bonilha after a less than an hour of play, some 8 minutes after Marko Divković's decisive goal. Nitra lost the fixture 0:1.

== Personal life ==
Olivero graduated from sport's gymnasium in Nitra and, per his communication, identifies as a Christian. In November 2021 it was revealed, that he invested in Bitcoin in 2016.
