= Marek Ondrík =

Slovak footballer

Personal information
- Full name: Marek Ondrík
- Date of birth: 30 November 1990 (age 35)
- Place of birth: Ružomberok, Czechoslovakia
- Height: 1.85 m (6 ft 1 in)
- Position: Defender

Team information
- Current team: FK Inter Bratislava
- Number: 18

Youth career
- Ružomberok

Senior career*
Years	Team	Apps	(Gls)
2009–	Ružomberok	2	(0)
2012–	→ Inter Bratislava (loan)		
- * Club domestic league appearances and goals as of 3 September 2012

Marek Ondrík (born 30 November 1990 in Ružomberok) is a Slovak football defender who currently plays for FK Inter Bratislava, on loan from MFK Ružomberok.
