= Patrik Danek =

Slovak footballer

Personal information
- Full name: Patrik Danek
- Date of birth: 2 October 2001 (age 25)
- Place of birth: Trnava, Slovakia
- Height: 1.70 m (5 ft 7 in)
- Positions: Winger; attacking midfielder

Team information
- Current team: Michalovce
- Number: 22

Youth career
- 2009–2016: FC Slovan Hlohovec
- 2016–2019: Nitra

Senior career*
Years	Team	Apps	(Gls)
2019–2021	Nitra	16	(1)
2021–2025	Petržalka	91	(25)
2026–	Michalovce	13	(3)

International career^{‡}
2017	Slovakia U17	1	(0)
- Slovakia U18
2019	Slovakia U19	3	(0)
- * Club domestic league appearances and goals as of 21 September 2026 ‡ National team caps and goals as of 19 November 2019

Patrik Danek (born 2 October 2001) is a Slovak footballer who plays for MFK Zemplín Michalovce as a winger.

== Club career ==
Danek made his professional Fortuna Liga debut for Nitra against Spartak Trnava during a home 1–0 victory at pod Zoborom on 2 November 2019. He came on after 87 minutes of play to replace Samuel Šefčík, with the final score already set by Milan Ristovski earlier in the first half.

In 2021, Danes joined FC Petržalka. The most successful season for him was 2023/24, in which he scored 14 goals, helping his team to reach the play-offs for the highest competition.

In January 2026, it was announced that Danek would be returning to the first division, joining MFK Zemplín Michalovce and signing a 3 year contract.
