= Ekin Çelebi =

German footballer

Personal information
- Date of birth: 6 June 2000 (age 26)
- Place of birth: Nuremberg, Germany
- Height: 1.84 m (6 ft 0 in)
- Position: Left-back

Team information
- Current team: Rot-Weiss Essen
- Number: 26

Youth career
- –2012: SGV Nürnberg-Fürth
- 2012–2019: 1. FC Nürnberg

Senior career*
| Years | Team | Apps | (Gls) |
| 2019–2021 | 1. FC Nürnberg II | 6 | (0) |
| 2020–2021 | 1. FC Nürnberg | 0 | (0) |
| 2021 | Nitra | 13 | (0) |
| 2021–2022 | VfB Stuttgart II | 34 | (0) |
| 2022–2023 | Hannover 96 | 1 | (0) |
| 2022–2023 | Hannover 96 II | 8 | (2) |
| 2023– | Rot-Weiss Essen | 3 | (0) |
| 2025–2026 | → 1. FC Schweinfurt 05 (loan) | 20 | (2) |

International career^{‡}
| 2018 | Germany U19 | 1 | (0) |
- * Club domestic league appearances and goals as of 30 May 2026 ‡ National team caps and goals as of 14:18, 20 February 2021 (UTC)

Ekin Çelebi (born 6 June 2000) is a German professional footballer who plays as a left-back for 3. Liga club Rot-Weiss Essen.

== Career ==
Çelebi made his professional debut for Nitra in the Slovak Super Liga on 6 February 2021, coming on as a substitute in the 86th minute for Yanni Regäsel against Pohronie. The away match finished as a 3–1 loss.
