= Veľké Ludince =

Municipality of Slovakia

Veľké Ludince Nagyölved
- Municipality
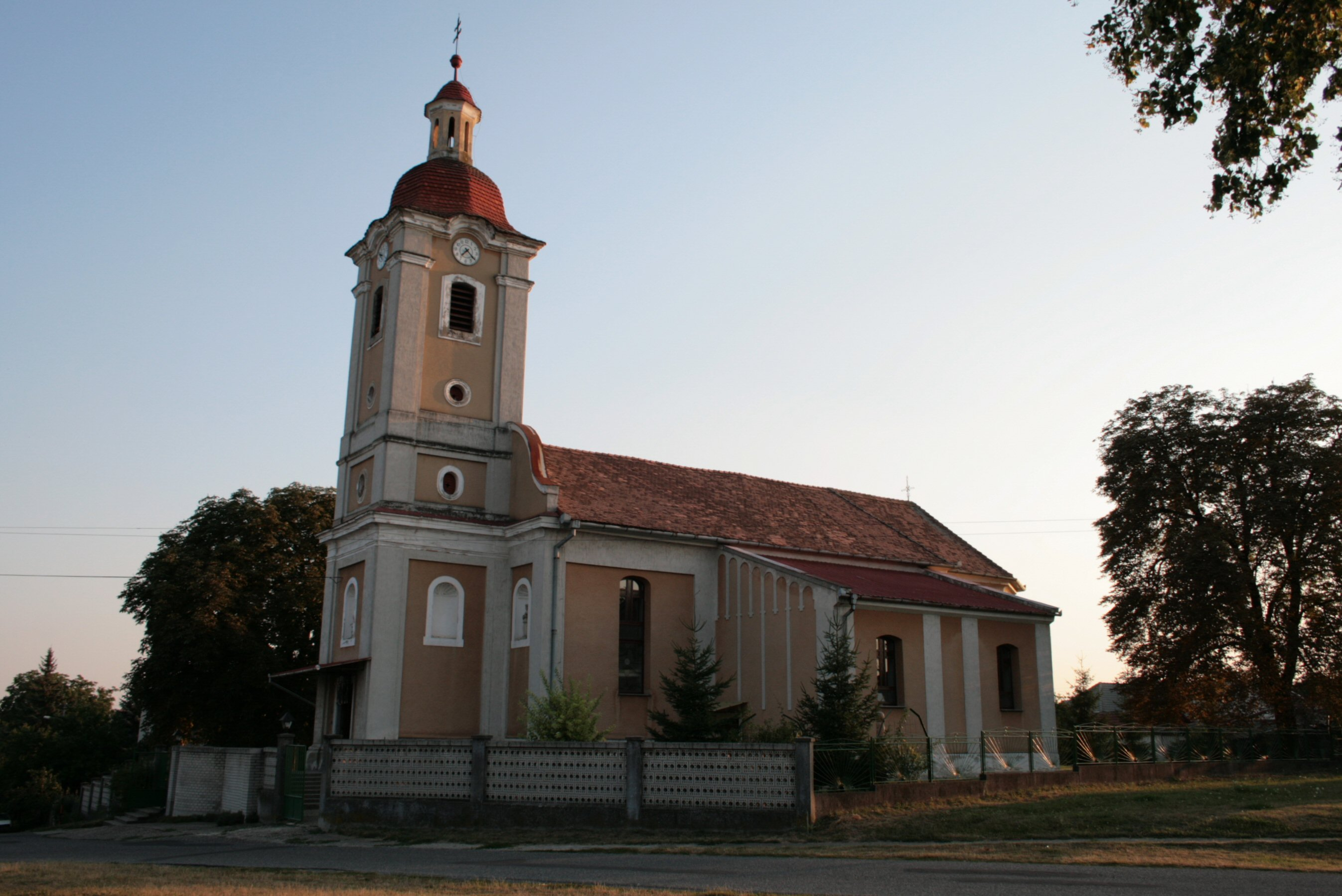
- Holy Guardian Angels church in Veľké Ludince

- Flag

- Location of Veľké Ludince in the Nitra Region Location of Veľké Ludince in Slovakia
- Coordinates: 47.97°N 18.52°E
- Country: Slovakia
- Region: Nitra Region
- District: Levice District
- First mentioned: 1282

Area
  - Total: 31.80 km^{2} (12.28 sq mi)
- Elevation: 173 m (568 ft)

Population (2025)
  - Total: 1,452
- Time zone: UTC+1 (CET)
  - Summer (DST): UTC+2 (CEST)
- Postal code: 935 65
- Area code: +421 36
- Vehicle registration plate (until 2022): LV
- Website: www.velkeludince.sk

Veľké Ludince (Hungarian: Nagyölved) is a village and municipality in the Levice District in the Nitra Region of Slovakia.

== History ==
In historical records the village was first mentioned in 1282.

== Geography ==
The municipality lies at an altitude of 173 metres (568 ft) and covers an area of 31.80 km^{2} (12.28 sq mi) (2025).

== Population ==
Population statistic (10 years)
Year	1995	2005	2015	2025
Count	1708	1652	1489	1452
Difference		−3.27%	−9.86%	−2.48%

Population statistic
Year	2024	2025
Count	1458	1452
Difference		−0.41%

It has a population of 1452 people (31 December 2025).

=== Ethnicity ===
Census 2021 (1+ %)
Ethnicity	Number	Fraction
Hungarian	1053	71.92%
Slovak	401	27.39%
Not found out	65	4.43%
Romani	46	3.14%
Total	1464	

In year 2021 was 1464 people by ethnicity 1053 as Hungarian, 401 as Slovak, 65 as Not found out, 46 as Romani, 7 as Czech, 2 as Ukrainian, 2 as Other and 1 as Albanian.

Note on population: The difference values of population numbers in the table "Population statistic" and in the sections "Ethnicity" & "Religion" is caused by the use of various statistical methods.

=== Religion ===
Census 2021 (1+ %)
Religion	Number	Fraction
Roman Catholic Church	1056	72.13%
Calvinist Church	193	13.18%
None	121	8.27%
Not found out	51	3.48%
Total	1464	

In year 2021 was 1464 people by religion 1056 from Roman Catholic Church, 193 from Calvinist Church, 121 from None, 51 from Not found out, 11 from Christian Congregations in Slovakia, 7 from Greek Catholic Church, 6 from Old Catholic Church, 6 from Evangelical Church, 3 from Eastern Orthodox Church, 2 from Other and not ascertained christian church, 2 from Jehovah's Witnesses, 2 from Islam, 1 from New Apostolic Church, 1 from Other, 1 from United Methodist Church and 1 from Ad hoc movements.

== Facilities ==
The village has a public library a gym and football pitch.
