= Veľký Cetín =

Village and municipality in Slovakia

Veľký Cetín Nagycétény
- Municipality
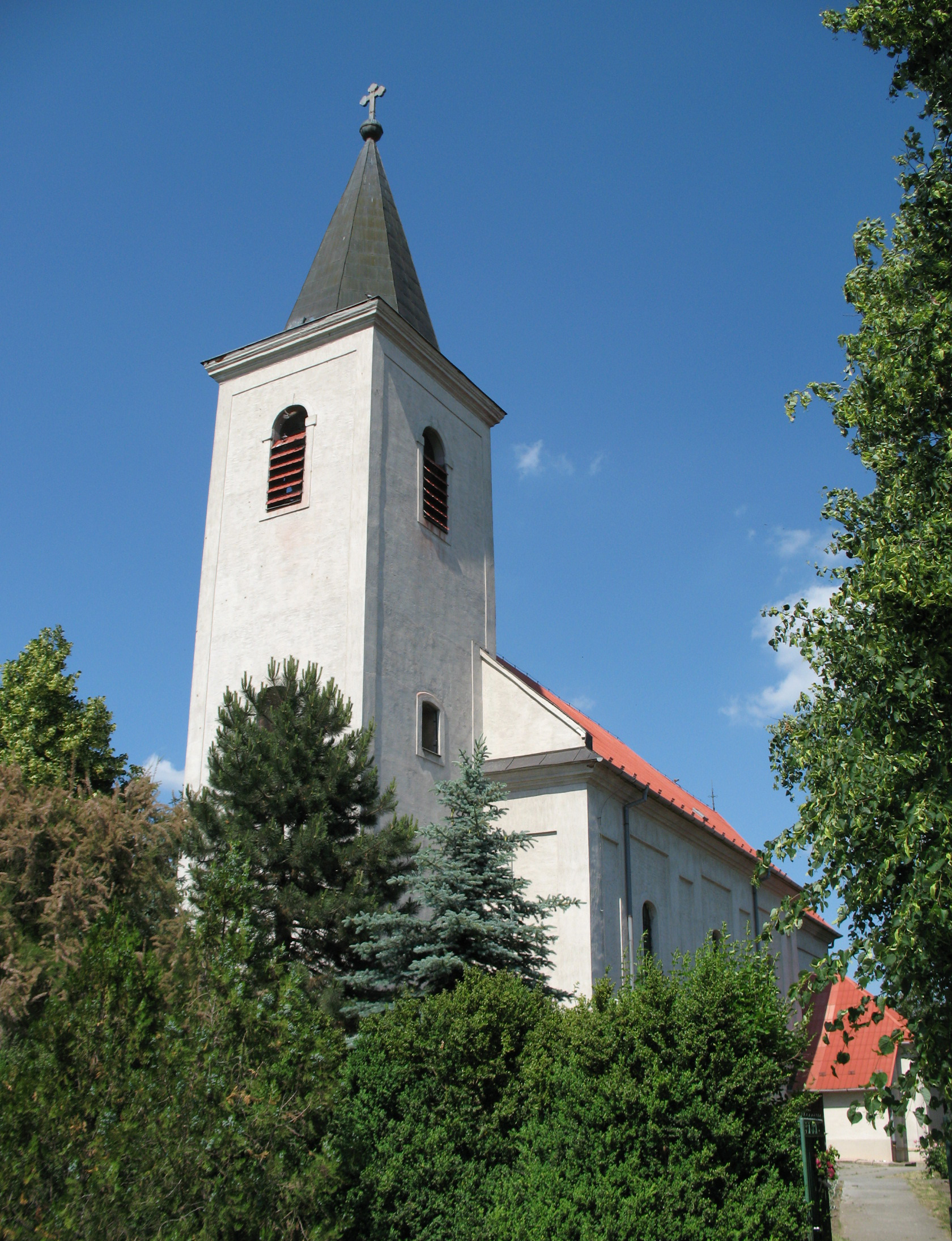

- Flag

- Location of Veľký Cetín in the Nitra Region Location of Veľký Cetín in Slovakia
- Coordinates: 48.22°N 18.20°E
- Country: Slovakia
- Region: Nitra Region
- District: Nitra District
- First mentioned: 1239

Area
  - Total: 16.86 km^{2} (6.51 sq mi)
- Elevation: 132 m (433 ft)

Population (2025)
  - Total: 1,598
- Time zone: UTC+1 (CET)
  - Summer (DST): UTC+2 (CEST)
- Postal code: 951 05
- Area code: +421 37
- Vehicle registration plate (until 2022): NR
- Website: www.velkycetin.sk/sk/

Veľký Cetín (Hungarian: Nagycétény) is a village and municipality in the Nitra District in western central Slovakia, in the Nitra Region.

== History ==
In historical records the village was first mentioned in 1239.

== Geography ==
The municipality lies at an altitude of 132 metres (433 ft) and covers an area of 16.86 km^{2} (6.51 sq mi) (2025).

== Population ==
Population statistic (10 years)
Year	1995	2005	2015	2025
Count	1716	1680	1580	1598
Difference		−2.09%	−5.95%	+1.13%

Population statistic
Year	2024	2025
Count	1607	1598
Difference		−0.56%

It has a population of 1598 people (31 December 2025).

=== Ethnicity ===
Census 2021 (1+ %)
Ethnicity	Number	Fraction
Hungarian	972	59.77%
Slovak	688	42.31%
Not found out	73	4.48%
Total	1626	

In year 2021 was 1626 people by ethnicity 972 as Hungarian, 688 as Slovak, 73 as Not found out, 6 as Czech, 5 as Russian, 2 as Polish, 1 as Ukrainian and 1 as Rusyn.

Note on population: The difference values of population numbers in the table "Population statistic" and in the sections "Ethnicity" & "Religion" is caused by the use of various statistical methods.

=== Religion ===
Census 2021 (1+ %)
Religion	Number	Fraction
Roman Catholic Church	1355	83.33%
None	158	9.72%
Not found out	68	4.18%
Total	1626	

In year 2021 was 1626 people by religion 1355 from Roman Catholic Church, 158 from None, 68 from Not found out, 12 from Greek Catholic Church, 8 from Evangelical Church, 6 from Calvinist Church, 6 from Ad hoc movements, 4 from Christian Congregations in Slovakia, 2 from Eastern Orthodox Church, 2 from Hinduism, 2 from Apostolic Church, 1 from Old Catholic Church, 1 from Jehovah's Witnesses and 1 from Other.
