= Erik Šuľa =

Slovak footballer

Personal information
- Date of birth: 30 May 1995 (age 31)
- Place of birth: Poprad, Slovakia
- Height: 1.93 m (6 ft 4 in)
- Position: Centre-back

Team information
- Current team: Edinburgh City

Youth career
- –2014: Poprad
- 2010–2014: AS Trenčín

Senior career*
| Years | Team | Apps | (Gls) |
| 2014–2018 | Poprad | 55 | (3) |
| 2018 | → Partizán Bardejov (loan) | 13 | (1) |
| 2019–2020 | Fotbal Třinec | 20 | (0) |
| 2020–2021 | Nitra | 5 | (0) |
| 2021–2022 | Zemplín Michalovce | 5 | (0) |
| 2022–2024 | Clyde | 48 | (1) |
| 2024–2025 | Stirling Albion | 21 | (3) |
| 2025 | East Kilbride | 1 | (0) |
| 2026– | Edinburgh City | 13 | (0) |
- * Club domestic league appearances and goals as of 4 May 2026

Erik Šuľa (born 30 May 1995) is a Slovak professional footballer who plays as a defender for Edinburgh City. He has previously played for Poprad, Partizán Bardejov, Třinec, Nitra, Zemplin Michalovce, Clyde and Stirling Albion.

== Club career ==
=== FC Nitra ===
Šuľa made his Fortuna Liga debut for Nitra against ViOn Zlaté Moravce on 17 October 2020.

=== Clyde ===
Šuľa signed for Scottish League One club Clyde in August 2022.

=== East Kilbride ===
In June 2025, Šuľa joined Scottish League Two side East Kilbride.
