= Gabriel Demian =

Slovak footballer

Personal information
- Full name: Gabriel Demian
- Date of birth: 4 December 2004 (age 21)
- Place of birth: Levice, Slovakia
- Height: 1.78 m (5 ft 10 in)
- Position: Midfielder

Team information
- Current team: Dukla Banská Bystrica
- Number: 14

Youth career
- –2015: Levice
- 2015–2021: FC Nitra
- 2021–2022: 1. FC Nürnberg

Senior career*
Years	Team	Apps	(Gls)
2021	FC Nitra	1	(0)
2023–	Dukla Banská Bystrica	2	(0)

International career^{‡}
2022–	Slovakia U19	2	(0)
- * Club domestic league appearances and goals as of 17 March 2023 ‡ National team caps and goals as of 25 August 2022

Gabriel Demian (born 4 December 2004) is a Slovak footballer who plays for Dukla Banská Bystrica as a midfielder.

== Club career ==
Demian made his Fortuna Liga debut for FC Nitra against MFK Zemplín Michalovce on 22 May 2021. He signed a contract with MFK Dukla Banská Bystrica at the end of January 2023.
