= Matej Franko =

Slovak footballer (born 2001)

Personal information
- Full name: Matej Franko
- Date of birth: 14 February 2001 (age 25)
- Place of birth: Galanta, Slovakia
- Height: 1.92 m (6 ft 4 in)
- Position: Forward

Team information
- Current team: Karviná

Youth career
- –2011: FC Pata
- 2011–2020: Nitra

Senior career*
Years	Team	Apps	(Gls)
2020–2022	Nitra	43	(8)
2022	→ Dukla Banská Bystrica (loan)	13	(5)
2022–2023	Dukla Banská Bystrica	27	(2)
2022–2023	→ Dolný Kubín (loan)	4	(0)
2023–	Karviná	3	(0)
2024	→ Humenné (loan)	12	(4)
2024–2025	→ Tatran Prešov (loan)	13	(6)
2025–2026	→ Tatran Liptovský Mikuláš (loan)	30	(14)
- * Club domestic league appearances and goals as of 25 May 2026

Matej Franko (born 14 February 2001) is a Slovak professional footballer who plays as a forward for Karviná.

== Club career ==
Franko made his Fortuna Liga debut for Nitra against Ružomberok on 22 August 2020 in a 1–1 home tie. He came on as a late second half replacement for Marián Chobot.
