= Branislav Spáčil =

Slovak footballer

Personal information
- Full name: Branislav Spáčil
- Date of birth: 20 September 2003 (age 23)
- Place of birth: Slovakia
- Height: 1.84 m (6 ft 0 in)
- Position: Right winger

Team information
- Current team: Odra Opole
- Number: 17

Youth career
- –2013: ŠK Dvorníky
- 2013–2016: Hlohovec
- 2017–2021: Nitra

Senior career*
Years	Team	Apps	(Gls)
2021	Nitra	4	(0)
2021–2023	Petržalka	42	(3)
2023–2024	Slovan Bratislava B	25	(2)
2024–2026	Górnik Łęczna	58	(7)
2026–	Odra Opole	0	(0)

International career
	Slovakia U16	2	(0)
2021	Slovakia U19	10	(0)
2022–2023	Slovakia U20	4	(0)
2024	Slovakia U21	5	(1)
- * Club domestic league appearances and goals as of 15:53, 26 May 2026 (UTC)

Branislav Spáčil (born 20 September 2003) is a Slovak professional footballer who plays for I liga club Odra Opole as a right winger.

== Club career ==
Spáčil made his Slovak Super Liga debut for Nitra against Senica during a 0–3 home loss at pod Zoborom on 17 April 2021.

On 18 July 2024, he moved from Slovan Bratislava B to Polish I liga club Górnik Łęczna on a one-year deal.

After Górnik's relegation, Spáčil signed a two-year contract with another I liga side Odra Opole on 12 June 2026.
