= KFC Kalná nad Hronom =

Slovak football club

- Full name: KFC Kalná nad Hronom
- Founded: 1920
- Ground: KFC Kalná nad Hronom Stadium, Kalná nad Hronom
- Capacity: 200
- President: Michal Gutan
- Head coach: Vladimír Drieňovský
- 2017–18: 1st (JV West) (promoted)
- Website: http://www.kalna.eu/obec-1/sport/kfc-kalna/

KFC Kalná nad Hronom is a Slovak football team, based in the town of Kalná nad Hronom.

== Colours ==
Club colours are blue and red.
