= Patrik Rédeky =

Slovak footballer

Personal information
- Full name: Patrik Rédeky
- Date of birth: 5 February 2002 (age 24)
- Place of birth: Bánovce nad Bebravou, Slovakia
- Height: 1.87 m (6 ft 2 in)
- Position: Defender

Team information
- Current team: FC Petržalka

Youth career
- –2013: TJ Sokol Zlatníky
- 2014–2017: Bánovce n. Bebravou
- 2018–2020: FC Nitra

Senior career*
Years	Team	Apps	(Gls)
2020–2021	Nitra	1	(0)
2021–	Petržalka	2	(0)
- * Club domestic league appearances and goals as of 6 August 2021

Patrik Rédeky (born 5 February 2002) is a Slovak footballer who plays for FC Petržalka as a defender.

== Club career ==
Rédeky made his professional Fortuna Liga debut for FC Nitra against MFK Ružomberok on 28 November 2020.
