= Kalná nad Hronom =

Kalná nad Hronom Kálna
- Municipality
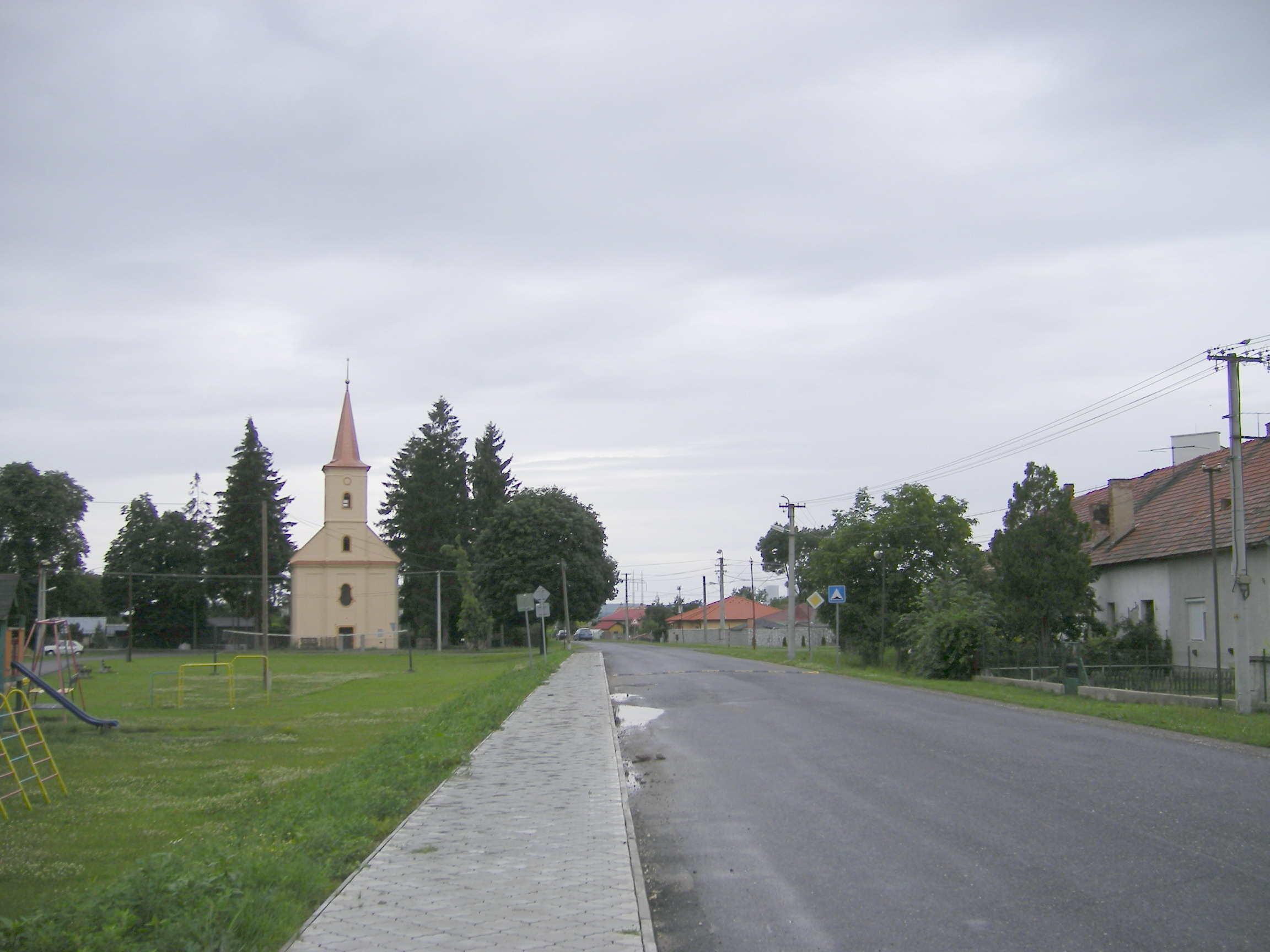

- Flag Coat of arms

- Location of Kalná nad Hronom in the Nitra Region Location of Kalná nad Hronom in Slovakia
- Coordinates: 48.21°N 18.53°E
- Country: Slovakia
- Region: Nitra Region
- District: Levice District
- First mentioned: 1209

Government
  - Mayor: Igor Gogora

Area
  - Total: 34.13 km^{2} (13.18 sq mi)
- Elevation: 175 m (574 ft)

Population (2025)
  - Total: 2,012
- Time zone: UTC+1 (CET)
  - Summer (DST): UTC+2 (CEST)
- Postal code: 935 32
- Area code: +421 36
- Vehicle registration plate (until 2022): LV
- Website: www.kalna.eu

Kalná nad Hronom (Hungarian: Kálna) is a village and municipality in the Levice District in the Nitra Region of Slovakia.

== History ==
In historical records the village was first mentioned in 1209.

== Geography ==
The municipality lies at an altitude of 175 metres (574 ft) and covers an area of 34.13 km^{2} (13.18 sq mi) (2025).

== Population ==
Population statistic (10 years)
Year	1995	2005	2015	2025
Count	2071	2068	2080	2012
Difference		−0.14%	+0.58%	−3.26%

Population statistic
Year	2024	2025
Count	2025	2012
Difference		−0.64%

It has a population of 2012 people (31 December 2025).

=== Ethnicity ===
Census 2021 (1+ %)
Ethnicity	Number	Fraction
Slovak	1595	76.94%
Not found out	280	13.5%
Hungarian	238	11.48%
Total	2073	

In year 2021 was 2073 people by ethnicity 1595 as Slovak, 280 as Not found out, 238 as Hungarian, 12 as Romani, 11 as Czech, 5 as Russian, 2 as Ukrainian, 2 as German, 2 as Other, 1 as Jewish, 1 as Vietnamese, 1 as Italian, 1 as Rusyn, 1 as Romanian and 1 as Bulgarian.

Note on population: The difference values of population numbers in the table "Population statistic" and in the sections "Ethnicity" & "Religion" is caused by the use of various statistical methods.

=== Religion ===
Census 2021 (1+ %)
Religion	Number	Fraction
Roman Catholic Church	837	40.38%
None	603	29.09%
Not found out	277	13.36%
Evangelical Church	202	9.74%
Calvinist Church	103	4.97%
Total	2073	

In year 2021 was 2073 people by religion 837 from Roman Catholic Church, 603 from None, 277 from Not found out, 202 from Evangelical Church, 103 from Calvinist Church, 11 from Greek Catholic Church, 11 from Church of the Brethren, 9 from Ad hoc movements, 4 from Jehovah's Witnesses, 3 from Paganism and natural spirituality, 3 from Christian Congregations in Slovakia, 2 from Other and not ascertained christian church, 2 from Other, 2 from Hinduism, 2 from Buddhism, 1 from Eastern Orthodox Church and 1 from Apostolic Church.

== Government ==
The village has its own birth registry and police force.

== Facilities ==
The village has a public library a gym and football pitch an.

== Genealogical resources ==
The records for genealogical research are available at the state archive "Statny Archiv in Nitra, Slovakia"

- Roman Catholic church records (births/marriages/deaths): 1726-1896 (parish A)
- Reformated church records (births/marriages/deaths): 1790-1898 (parish A)

== See also ==
- List of municipalities and towns in Slovakia
