= FK Tempo Partizánske =

Slovak football club

- Full name: FK Tempo Partizánske
- Founded: 1940
- Ground: Štadión Karola Jokla, Partizánske
- Capacity: 1,500
- Head coach: Miloš Krško
- League: 3. liga
- 2020–21: 4. liga SZ ZsFZ, 1st (promoted)
- Website: http://fktempope.sk/

FK Tempo Partizánske is a Slovak football team, based in the town of Partizánske. The club was founded in 1940. Club colors are red and white. FK Tempo Partizánske home stadium is Štadión Karola Jokla with a capacity of 1,500 spectators.

== Historical names ==
- FK Tempo Partizánske (?–present)
