= Timotej Záhumenský =

Slovak footballer

Personal information
- Full name: Timotej Záhumenský
- Date of birth: 17 July 1995 (age 31)
- Place of birth: Žiar nad Hronom, Slovakia
- Height: 1.84 m (6 ft 0 in)
- Position: Left back

Team information
- Current team: ViOn Zlaté Moravce
- Number: 44

Youth career
- Dukla Banská Bystrica
- Slovan Bratislava

Senior career*
Years	Team	Apps	(Gls)
2014–2015	Slovan Bratislava	5	(0)
2015	→ ŽP Šport Podbrezová (loan)	0	(0)
2016–2017	Skalica	16	(2)
2017	→ Fluminense Šamorín (loan)	13	(0)
2017	ViOn Zlaté Moravce	19	(1)
2018–2020	Dunajská Streda	19	(0)
2019	→ Karviná (loan)	13	(0)
2019–2020	→ Spartak Trnava (loan)	5	(0)
2020	Nitra	14	(0)
2021	Zbrojovka Brno	7	(0)
2021–2022	Pohronie	16	(1)
2022	→ Dukla Banská Bystrica (loan)	11	(0)
2022–2025	Dukla Banská Bystrica	73	(3)
2025–2026	ViOn Zlaté Moravce	20	(1)
- * Club domestic league appearances and goals as of 25 May 2026

Timotej Záhumenský (born 17 July 1995) is a Slovak footballer who plays as a left back for ViOn Zlaté Moravce.

== Club career ==
=== Slovan Bratislava ===
Záhumenský made his Corgoň liga debut for Slovan Bratislava in a traditional derby at Štadión Antona Malatinského on 31 May 2014 against Spartak Trnava, being sent off in the 52nd minute of the match after receiving a second yellow card.

=== FK Pohronie ===
After half-year spent in Czech First League with Zbrojovka Brno, Záhumenský returned to Fortuna Liga to feature for Pohronie.

== Personal life ==
Záhumenský was born in Žiar nad Hronom, grew up in and resides in Nová Baňa. According to his social media communication, Záhumenský adheres to Catholicism.
