= Nikola Gatarić =

Croatian footballer

Personal information
- Full name: Nikola Gatarić
- Date of birth: 9 March 1992 (age 34)
- Place of birth: Zagreb, Croatia
- Height: 1.78 m (5 ft 10 in)
- Position: Winger

Team information
- Current team: SV Stripfing
- Number: 25

Youth career
- 2002-2007: Croatia Sesvete
- 2007-2008: Dubrava
- 2008: Croatia Sesvete
- 2009: Dubrava
- 2009-2011: Sesvete

Senior career*
Years	Team	Apps	(Gls)
2010–2011	Radnik Sesvete		
2011	Dugo Selo		
2012	Radnik Sesvete	6	(0)
2013	Zelina	15	(3)
2013	Lučko	15	(2)
2014	Zelina	13	(1)
2014	Solothurn	6	(3)
2015	Brežice 1919		
2015–2016	Oberachern	16	(2)
2016	Brežice 1919	14	(6)
2017	Krško	11	(2)
2017	Celje	7	(0)
2018	Tatran Prešov	12	(3)
2018	iClinic Sereď	17	(7)
2019–2020	Nitra	47	(2)
2021	Ermis Aradippou	17	(2)
2021	Orion Tip Sereď	18	(2)
2022–	SV Stripfing	62	(24)
- * Club domestic league appearances and goals as of 26 May 2024

Nikola Gatarić (born 9 March 1992) is a Croatian professional footballer who plays as a winger for Austrian Football Second League side SV Stripfing.
