= Matúš Kuník =

Slovak footballer

Personal information
- Date of birth: 14 May 1997 (age 29)
- Place of birth: Piešťany, Slovakia
- Height: 1.84 m (6 ft 0 in)
- Positions: Defender; midfielder

Team information
- Current team: Petržalka
- Number: 22

Youth career
- –2012: Slovan Veľké Orvište
- 2012–2015: Nitra

Senior career*
| Years | Team | Apps | (Gls) |
| 2015–2020 | Nitra | 117 | (1) |
| 2021 | Sereď | 4 | (0) |
| 2021− | Petržalka | 53 | (0) |

International career
- Slovakia U15
- Slovakia U16
- Slovakia U17
- Slovakia U18
- Slovakia U19
- * Club domestic league appearances and goals as of 23 May 2023

Matúš Kuník (born 14 May 1997) is a Slovak footballer who plays for FC Petržalka as a defender.

== Club career ==
=== FC Nitra ===
Kuník made his Fortuna Liga debut for Nitra against Žilina on 22 July 2017. Kuník played the entire match as Nitra achieved a surprising 1–0 victory.
