= Tidiane Djiby Ba =

Senegalese footballer (born 1993)

Personal information
- Full name: Tidiane Djiby Ba
- Date of birth: 23 July 1993 (age 33)
- Place of birth: Dakar, Senegal
- Height: 1.91 m (6 ft 3 in)
- Position: Centre-back

Team information
- Current team: FK Inter Bratislava
- Number: 16

Youth career
- 2009–2010: Bradlan Brezová pod Bradlom
- 2010–2012: Spartak Trnava

Senior career*
Years	Team	Apps	(Gls)
2013	Spartak Trnava B	0	(0)
2013	→ Dubnica (loan)		
2013–2014	→ Baník Most (loan)	12	(0)
2015–2016	Spartak Trnava B	15	(2)
2015–2016	→ Sereď (loan)	22	(4)
2016–2021	iClinic Sereď	121	(13)
2021	Nitra	10	(0)
2021–2022	Třinec	20	(3)
2022–2023	Sitra		(0)
2023–2024	Dolný Kubín	12	(1)
2024–2025	FK Rača	27	(1)
2025–	FK Inter Bratislava	24	(2)
- * Club domestic league appearances and goals as of 25 May 2026

Tidiane Djiby Ba (born 23 July 1993) is a Senegalese professional footballer who plays as a defender for 2.Liga club FK Inter Bratislava.

== Club career ==
=== ŠKF iClinic Sereď ===
Djiby Ba made his Fortuna Liga debut for iClinic Sereď against Ružomberok on 21 July 2018, in a goal-less tie. He concluded his tenure in the club in December 2020.

=== FC Nitra ===
Djiby Ba joined Nitra in January 2021, after requesting his release from Sereď. In Nitra he reunited with his former manager Peter Lérant, who managed him earlier in Sereď.
