= Bonilha =

Brazilian footballer (born 1996)

Personal information
- Full name: Wallace Bonilha Felix
- Date of birth: 26 January 1996 (age 30)
- Place of birth: Rio de Janeiro, Brazil
- Height: 1.88 m (6 ft 2 in)
- Position: Right back

Team information
- Current team: Żabbar St. Patrick
- Number: 8

Youth career
- –2016: Fluminense
- 2016: Lahti

Senior career*
Years	Team	Apps	(Gls)
2016–2018	Fluminense	0	(0)
2016	→ Lahti (loan)	19	(1)
2017	→ Tupi (loan)	16	(0)
2017	→ Oeste (loan)	7	(1)
2018–2020	Oeste	43	(0)
2020	Nitra	2	(0)
2021	Figueirense	0	(0)
2023	Esporte Clube Lemense	11	(0)
2024	Goiânia	10	(0)
2024–	Żabbar St. Patrick	26	(0)
- * Club domestic league appearances and goals as of 26 June 2025

Wallace Bonilha Felix (born 26 January 1996) is a Brazilian footballer who currently plays for Żabbar St. Patrick.

== Club career ==
=== Lahti ===
Wallace made his debut for Lahti against Inter Turku on 9 April 2016. He scored his first goal for the club against Ilves on 10 August 2016, scoring in the 68th minute.

Wallace also played for Lahti's reserve side, making his debut against Kultsu on 5 June 2016.

=== Tupi ===
Wallace made his debut for Tupi against America TO on 5 February 2017.

=== Oeste ===
Wallace made his debut for Oeste against Guarani SP on 17 January 2018. He scored his first goal for the club against Coritiba on 5 May 2018, scoring in the 47th minute.

=== FC Nitra ===
Bonilha made his Fortuna Liga debut for Nitra at Tehelné pole against reigning champions Slovan Bratislava on 1 November 2020. Bonilha came in as a last-minute replacement for Michal Faško, with the final score already set for Nitra through Alen Mustafić's second-half strike. Bonilha only appeared for one other fixture for Nitra, playing at pod Zoborom against DAC 1904 Dunajská Streda.

=== EC Lemense ===
Wallace made his debut for EC Lemense against Taubaté on 15 January 2023.

=== Goiânia ===
Wallace made his debut for Goiânia against Goiás on 18 January 2024.

=== Zabbar St.Patrick ===
On 2 July 2024, Bonilha was announced at newly promoted Maltese Premier League Team Zabbar St.Patrick.
