= Sinan Kurt (footballer, born 1996) =

German footballer

Personal information
- Full name: Sinan Georg Kurt
- Date of birth: 23 July 1996 (age 30)
- Place of birth: Mönchengladbach, Germany
- Height: 1.73 m (5 ft 8 in)
- Position: Winger

Team information
- Current team: Karaman FK
- Number: 11

Youth career
- 2007–2014: Borussia M'gladbach
- 2014–2015: Bayern Munich

Senior career*
Years	Team	Apps	(Gls)
2014	Borussia M'gladbach II	1	(0)
2014–2016	Bayern Munich II	13	(1)
2014–2016	Bayern Munich	1	(0)
2016–2018	Hertha BSC	2	(0)
2016–2018	Hertha BSC II	41	(3)
2019	WSG Wattens	13	(1)
2020–2021	SV 19 Straelen	7	(0)
2021	Nitra	13	(0)
2023–	Karaman FK	7	(0)

International career
2010	Germany U15	2	(0)
2011–2012	Germany U16	5	(1)
2012–2013	Germany U17	9	(1)
2013–2014	Germany U18	9	(4)
2014–2015	Germany U19	4	(0)
- * Club domestic league appearances and goals as of 04:59, 4 July 2024 (UTC)

Sinan Georg Kurt (born 23 July 1996) is a German professional footballer who plays as a winger for Turkish TFF Second League club Karaman FK.

== Club career ==
=== Borussia Mönchengladbach ===
Kurt was born in Mönchengladbach to a Turkish father and a German mother. He joined the youth setup at Borussia Mönchengladbach in 2007, progressing through the youth ranks until his promotion to Borussia Mönchengladbach II in 2014. In the years prior to his promotion, Kurt played for the Borussia B-Jugend, U-17 team, registering 31 goals and 21 assists in 52 games. Because of his good performances for the U-17 side, Kurt signed a developmental contract with Gladbach, intended to tie him to the club until 2016 at which point a professional contract would come into effect. For the 2013–14 season, Kurt played in Gladbach's U-19 team, where he scored 16 goals in 24 appearances. This led to his promotion to the second team and he made his professional debut against Viktoria Köln on 2 August 2014, replacing Marlon Ritter for the last 15 minutes of the 2–1 Regionalliga West match.

In late August 2014, it was reported that Bayern Munich were interested in signing the player and that Kurt wanted to make the move to Bayern. Gladbach officials refused to allow the player to leave before his contract expired in 2016. However the DFL ruled that since the contract was signed when Kurt was underage, 16, that it was not legally accepted and that Bayern were allowed to purchase the player.

=== Bayern Munich ===
On 31 August 2014, Bayern Munich confirmed that they had signed Kurt to a four-year contract. Kurt made his Bayern debut for the reserve team against SV Schalding-Heining on 17 October 2014. He made his debut for the first team in a 1–0 home win against Hertha BSC.

In the first 21 matchdays for the reserve team during the 2015–16 season, he started in only ten matches. He also came on in another five substitute appearances during that time span.

=== Hertha BSC ===
Kurt signed a contract with Hertha BSC until 30 June 2019 in January 2016. He failed to establish himself as a contender for the starting eleven throughout his time at the club, with coach Pál Dárdai publicly criticizing his performance. Having appeared in only two Bundesliga games for Hertha, Kurt was temporarily excluded from team training in early 2018, a measure imposed as part of an attempt to have him catch up on his physical deficits through individual training. He was permanently demoted to reserve team Hertha BSC II in July 2018. He left the club six months before the end of his contract.

=== WSG Wattens ===
In January 2019, Kurt moved to WSG Wattens, an Austrian club playing in the second division. He appeared in 13 games during the remainder of the 2018–19 season and scored one goal. Wattens, who ultimately won promotion to the Austrian Football Bundesliga, did not extend his contract.

=== SV Straelen ===
After spending more than a year without a club, Kurt signed with recently promoted Regionalliga West side SV 19 Straelen in September 2020. The club terminated his contract in January 2021, citing poor performance.

=== FC Nitra ===
Kurt signed with Slovak Super Liga side FC Nitra on 11 January 2021.

== Career statistics ==
As of 10 May 2018

Appearances and goals by club, season and competition
Club	Season	League			Cup		Continental		Total		Ref.
Club	Season	Division	Apps	Goals	Apps	Goals	Apps	Goals	Apps	Goals	Ref.
Borussia Mönchengladbach II	2014–15	Regionalliga West	1	0	—		—		1	0	
Bayern Munich II	2014–15	Regionalliga Bayern	1	0	—		—		1	0	
Bayern Munich II	2015–16	Regionalliga Bayern	15	1	—		—		15	1	
Bayern Munich II	Total		16	1	0	0	0	0	16	1	—
Bayern Munich	2014–15	Bundesliga	1	0	0	0	0	0	1	0	
Hertha BSC II	2015–16	Regionalliga Nordost	6	1	—		—		6	1	
Hertha BSC II	2016–17	Regionalliga Nordost	7	1	—		—		7	1	
Hertha BSC II	2017–18	Regionalliga Nordost	21	1	—		—		21	1	
Hertha BSC II	Total		34	3	0	0	0	0	34	2	—
Hertha BSC	2016–17	Bundesliga	2	0	1	0	—		3	0	
Career total			54	4	1	0	0	0	55	4	—

== Honours ==
Bayern Munich

- Bundesliga: 2014–15
