= Samuel Šefčík =

Slovak footballer

Personal information
- Date of birth: 4 November 1996 (age 30)
- Place of birth: Bratislava, Slovakia
- Height: 1.82 m (6 ft 0 in)
- Positions: Attacking midfielder; winger

Team information
- Current team: FC Petržalka
- Number: 96

Youth career
- Inter Bratislava
- –2015: Slovan Bratislava
- 2014: → Senec (loan)
- 2015: Alboraya
- 2015: Slovan Bratislava

Senior career*
| Years | Team | Apps | (Gls) |
| 2015–2017 | Slovan Bratislava B | 44 | (5) |
| 2016–2018 | Slovan Bratislava | 6 | (1) |
| 2017–2018 | → Senica (loan) | 15 | (1) |
| 2018–2019 | Vysočina Jihlava | 17 | (0) |
| 2019–2021 | Nitra | 41 | (4) |
| 2021–2024 | Ružomberok | 44 | (11) |
| 2024–2025 | AS Trenčín | 7 | (0) |
| 2025 | Inter Bratislava | 11 | (0) |
| 2026– | FC Petržalka | 12 | (1) |
- * Club domestic league appearances and goals as of 25 May 2026

Samuel Šefčík (born 4 November 1996) is a Slovak footballer who plays for FC Petržalka as an attacking midfielder or winger.

== Club career ==
Šefčík made his Fortuna Liga debut for Slovan Bratislava on 9 April 2016 against Ružomberok. He had to go off, though, after twenty minutes due to injury. He was replaced by future Slovak international, Filip Oršula.

After two years in FC Nitra he joined Ružomberok in June 2021. He immediately had meniscus surgery, but was able to make his debut in November 2021. Soon after, however, in January 2022 he tore an anterior cruciate ligament and was out until the spring of 2023. MFK Ružomberok nonetheless decided to retain Šefčík, who signed a contract until 2025.

On 4 September 2024, he became player of AS Trenčín, after spending three seasons in MFK Ružomberok.
