= Yanni Regäsel =

German footballer

Personal information
- Date of birth: 13 January 1996 (age 30)
- Place of birth: Berlin, Germany
- Height: 1.80 m (5 ft 11 in)
- Position: Right-back

Team information
- Current team: SV Wilhelmshaven
- Number: 39

Youth career
- 2012–2015: Hertha BSC

Senior career*
Years	Team	Apps	(Gls)
2013–2016	Hertha BSC II	52	(0)
2015–2016	Hertha BSC	6	(0)
2016–2018	Eintracht Frankfurt	10	(0)
2018–2019	MSV Duisburg	5	(0)
2021	Nitra	13	(0)
2021–2023	Rot-Weiß Koblenz	46	(2)
2023–2024	TuS Bövinghausen	25	(5)
2024	Westfalia Herne	2	(0)
2024–2025	TuS Bövinghausen	14	(1)
2025	Westfalia Herne	9	(0)
2025–	SV Wilhelmshaven	19	(0)

International career^{‡}
2010–2011	Germany U16	3	(0)
2013–2014	Germany U18	6	(0)
2014	Germany U19	2	(0)
- * Club domestic league appearances and goals as of 30 June 2026 ‡ National team caps and goals as of 5 February 2017

Yanni Regäsel (born 13 January 1996) is a German professional footballer who plays as a right-back for Oberliga Niedersachsen club SV Wilhelmshaven.

== Club career ==
Regäsel made his professional debut for Hertha BSC on 31 October 2015, in a Bundesliga match against Borussia Mönchengladbach in Olympiastadion.

He moved to Eintracht Frankfurt on 1 February 2016.

On 30 May 2018, he was signed by MSV Duisburg for the 2018–19 season. He left Duisburg after the 2018–19 season.

== International career ==
Regäsel is a youth international for Germany.

== Honours ==
Hertha BSC U19

- German U19 Cup: 2014–15
