= 2019–20 FC Nitra season =

Slovak football club season

FC Nitra
2019–20 season
- Owner: FC Nitra a. s.
- Chairman: Marián Valenta (until 8 August); Milan Červeň (from 6 November to 26 June)
- Head Coach: Marián Süttö (until 27 October); Gergely Geri (from 28 October to 6 January); Anatoliy Demyanenko (from 7 January to 5 March); Miroslav Nemec (from 6 March to 28 June); Ivan Galád (from 29 June)
- Stadium: Štadión pod Zoborom, Nitra
- Slovak 1st League: 12th
- Slovak Cup: Quarter-finals
- Top goalscorer: League: Milan Ristovski (12); All: Milan Ristovski (15)
- Highest home attendance: 2,670 vs Slovan Bratislava (First League, 1 March 2020)
- Lowest home attendance: 285 vs FK Senica (First League, 20 June 2020)
- Biggest win: 7–0 vs TJ Veľké Lovce (Slovak Cup, 10 September 2020)
- Biggest defeat: 0–5 vs Slovan Bratislava (First League, 28 September 2019)
Home colours	Away colours

The 2019–20 season was FC Nitra's third consecutive season in the top division of Slovak football. The club finished 11th in the regular season and subsequently competed in the relegation group, where it finished bottom of the table in 12th place, one point behind the team above them. FC Nitra therefore faced second-tier champions FK Dubnica in a relegation play-off to retain their place in the top flight. Nitra won the tie and secured their top-flight status. The top-flight season was suspended in March 2020 following the completion of the regular season due to the COVID-19 pandemic. The clubs voted on whether the competition should resume, with the majority ultimately favouring its continuation in a shortened format. However, stadiums were only permitted to operate at 50% of their capacity.

The club experienced financial difficulties during the season, which were expected to be resolved through the involvement of Ukrainian investors. However, their investment proved unsuccessful, and they subsequently withdrew from the club. Their involvement ultimately worsened the club's financial situation.

The club went through as many as five different head coaches during the season, with each change prompted by unsatisfactory results.

In the Slovak Cup, the club reached the quarter-finals, where they were eliminated by ViOn Zlaté Moravce on penalties.

== First-team squad ==
As of 17 July 2020

Note: Flags indicate national team as defined under FIFA eligibility rules; some limited exceptions apply. Players may hold more than one non-FIFA nationality.

No.	Pos.	Nation	Player
1	GK	SVK	Dávid Šípoš
3	DF	BRA	Joāo Augusto
5	DF	SVK	Sebastian Kóša
6	MF	CRO	Duje Javorčić
7	FW	SVK	Jakub Tancík
8	MF	SVK	Michal Faško
9	FW	SVK	Marek Fábry
9	MF	BRA	Daniel Jesus
10	MF	SVK	Frederik Bilovský
10	MF	SVK	Tomáš Hambálek
11	MF	SVK	Lukáš Fabiš
12	FW	SVK	Dominik Guláš
13	DF	SVK	Daniel Magda
14	MF	SVK	Miloš Šimončič
15	DF	SVK	Ondrej Elexa
16	FW	SVK	Marián Chobot
17	MF	SVK	Viktor Remeň
18	FW	SVK	Patrik Danek

No.	Pos.	Nation	Player
19	MF	SVK	Ondrej Vrábel
20	DF	SVK	Oliver Podhorin (captain)
21	MF	SVK	Samuel Šefčík
22	DF	SVK	Matúš Kuník
23	GK	SVK	Martin Kuciak
25	MF	CRO	Nikola Gatarić
26	DF	SVK	Pavol Farkaš (captain)
27	DF	SVK	Marek Dubeň
27	DF	UKR	Dmytro Nyemchaninov
30	DF	UGA	Isaac Muleme
32	GK	SVK	Erik Búš
33	FW	SVK	Matej Franko
37	MF	SVK	Matúš Mikuš
61	DF	KAZ	Midat Galbayev
77	FW	MKD	Milan Ristovski
97	DF	SVK	Patrik Šurnovský
98	MF	SVK	Šimon Štefanec
99	FW	CRO	Ante Kuliš

== Coaching staff ==
As of 17 July 2020

Staff	Job title
(Slovakia) Marián Süttö	Manager (until 27 October)
(Slovakia) Gergely Geri	Manager (from 28 October to 6 January)
(Ukraine) Anatoliy Demyanenko	Manager (from 7 January to 5 March)
(Slovakia) Miroslav Nemec	Manager (from 6 March to 28 June)
(Slovakia) Ivan Galád	Manager (from 29 June)
(Slovakia) Gergely Geri	Assistant manager (until 27 October)
(Slovakia) Henrich Benčík	Assistant manager (from 28 October to 6 January)
(Slovakia) Miroslav Nemec	Assistant manager (from 7 January to 5 March)
(Slovakia) Peter Venglarčík	Assistant manager (from 7 January to 28 June)
(Slovakia) Rastislav Božik	Assistant manager (from 29 June)
(Slovakia) Miroslav König	Goalkeeping coach
(Slovakia) Igor Bakaľár	Fitness coach
(Slovakia) Milan Michalčin	Team Doctor
(Slovakia) Ivan Štefanov	Team Doctor
(Slovakia) Štefan Balla	Physiotherapist
(Slovakia) Miroslav Okáľ	Physiotherapist

== Transfers and contracts ==
=== In ===
Date from	Pos.	Nationality	Player	From	Fee	Ref.
16 July 2019	MF	(Slovakia)	Ondrej Vrábel	(Slovakia) OFK Bošany	Free	
18 July 2019	DF	(Slovakia)	Oliver Podhorin	(Austria) Wiener Neustadt	Free	
26 July 2019	DF	(Kazakhstan)	Midat Galbayev	(Bulgaria) Vereya Stara Zagora	Free	
7 August 2019	MF	(Slovakia)	Michal Faško	(Switzerland) Grasshopper Zurich	Free	
9 August 2019	MF	(Slovakia)	Samuel Šefčík	(Czech Republic) Vysočina Jihlava	Free	
7 October 2019	MF	(Slovakia)	Matúš Mikuš	(Slovakia) Železiarne Podbrezová	Free	
14 February 2020	MF	(Croatia)	Duje Javorčić	(France) Amiens B	Free	
18 February 2020	FW	(Croatia)	Ante Kuliš	(Croatia) NK Dugopolje	Free	
3 March 2020	DF	(Ukraine)	Dmytro Nyemchaninov	(Ukraine) FC Rukh Lviv	Free	

=== Out ===
Date from	Pos.	Nationality	Player	To	Fee	Ref.
8 July 2019	DF	(Cameroon)	Macdonald Niba	(Hungary) Honvéd Budapest	Free	
10 July 2019	MF	(Slovakia)	Tomáš Kóňa	(Slovakia) Spartak Myjava	Free	
14 July 2019	DF	(Slovakia)	Ján Chovanec	(Slovakia) OFK Branč	Free	
15 July 2019	MF	(Slovakia)	Martin Macho	(Slovakia) Slovan Galanta	Free	
18 July 2019	GK	(Slovakia)	Branislav Pindroch	(Slovakia) ViOn Zlaté Moravce	Free	
23 July 2019	DF	(Slovakia)	Jaroslav Machovec	(Austria) FC Rohrendorf	Free	
23 July 2019	FW	(Slovakia)	Christián Steinhübel	(Austria) ASK-BSC Bruck/Leitha	Free	
23 July 2019	FW	(Ukraine)	Illya Cherednychenko	(Ukraine) Svitanok Shliakhova	Free	
23 July 2019	MF	(Slovakia)	Márius Charizopulos	(Hungary) Győri ETO	Free	
5 September 2019	FW	(Serbia)	Nemanja Soković	(Serbia) Jedinstvo Ruma	Free	
27 September 2019	DF	(Croatia)	Ivan Zgrablić	(Croatia) NK Uljanik Pula	Free	
3 February 2020	FW	(Slovakia)	Marek Fábry	(Czech Republic) Dukla Prague	Free	
1 March 2020	MF	(Slovakia)	Matúš Mikuš	(Slovakia) FK Pohronie	Free	
13 July 2020	DF	(Slovakia)	Patrik Šurnovský	(Slovakia) ŠK Šurany	Free	

=== Loans in ===
Date from	Pos.	Nationality	Player	From	Until	Ref.
19 January 2019	MF	(Slovakia)	Šimon Štefanec	(Slovakia) Hellas Verona	17 July 2020	
17 July 2019	DF	(Slovakia)	Daniel Magda	(Slovakia) Železiarne Podbrezová	17 July 2020	
19 July 2019	FW	(North Macedonia)	Milan Ristovski	(Croatia) HNK Rijeka	20 July 2020	
14 February 2020	DF	(Uganda)	Isaac Muleme	(Czech Republic) Viktoria Žižkov	17 July 2020	
21 February 2020	DF	(Brazil)	Daniel Jesus	(Brazil) Grêmio Novorizontino	17 July 2020	
21 February 2020	DF	(Brazil)	Joāo Augusto	(Brazil) Grêmio Novorizontino	3 August 2020	

=== Loans out ===
Date from	Pos.	Nationality	Player	To	Until	Ref.
20 January 2020	MF	(Slovakia)	Miloš Šimončič	(Slovakia) OFK 1948 Veľký Lapáš	30 July 2020	
27 February 2020	MF	(Slovakia)	Frederik Bilovský	(Slovakia) FK Dubnica	17 July 2020	

== Friendlies ==
Win Draw Loss

=== Pre-season ===
25 June 2019 Friendly	FC Nitra	2–2	Dukla Banská Bystrica	Alekšince
	Gatarić 75'; Tancík 78'	Report	Malík 74', 86'	Stadium: Alekšince Stadium

29 June 2019 Friendly	FC Nitra	2–1	ŠTK Šamorín	Nitra
	Tancík 10'; Chobot 23'			Stadium: Štadión pod Zoborom

30 June 2019 Friendly	FK Spartak Vráble	0–7	FC Nitra	Vráble
			Elexa 22'; Bilovský 50'; Guláš 51', 87'; Gatarić 65'; Šurnovský 71'; Vrábel 77'	Stadium: Štadión Vráble

6 July 2019 Friendly	(Czech Republic) Zbrojovka Brno	4–0	FC Nitra	Zastávka
17:00 CEST	Růsek 17', 60'; Magera 20'; Zikl 85'	Report		Stadium: TJ Čechie Zastávka Stadium

9 July 2019 Friendly	FC Nitra	1–0	(Ukraine) Rukh Lviv	Nitra
19:00 CEST	Gatarić 31'			Stadium: Štadión pod Zoborom

13 July 2019 Friendly	FC Nitra	0–3	(Hungary) Vasas SC	Nitra
18:00 CEST		Report	Hinora 41'; Birtalan 52', 73'	Stadium: Štadión pod Zoborom

=== Mid-season ===
15 January 2020 2020 Tipsport liga	FC Nitra	3–3	MFK Skalica	Dunajská Streda
13:00 CET	Ristovski 8'; Farkaš 39'; Mikuš 86'	Report	Hlavatovič 21'; Ranko 29'; Popović 74'	Stadium: DAC Aréna

19 January 2020 2020 Tipsport liga	FC Nitra	5–1	(Czech Republic) Zbrojovka Brno	Dunajská Streda
10:30 CET	Gatarić 4'; Martišiak 41'; Ristovski 69', 82'; Šefčík 88'	Report	Pachlopník 60'	Stadium: DAC Aréna

22 January 2020 2020 Tipsport liga	DAC Dunajská Streda	2–1	FC Nitra	Dunajská Streda
10:30 CET	Divković 62'; Ramírez 84'	Report	Kuliš 60'	Stadium: DAC Aréna; Attendance: 150

29 January 2020 Friendly	(Austria) SV Ried	2–1	FC Nitra	Ober-Grafendorf
14:30 CET	Ziegl 16'; Vojkovic 41'	Report	Ristovski 65'	Stadium: Ober-Grafendorf Stadium

1 February 2020 Friendly	FC Nitra	1–5	Dukla Banská Bystrica	Nitra
15:00 CET	Ristovski 55'			Stadium: Štadión pod Zoborom

5 February 2020 Friendly	FC Nitra	2–0	FK Poprad	Nitra
15:00 CET	Martišiak 31'; Štefanec 90'			Stadium: Štadión pod Zoborom

8 February 2020 Friendly	FC Nitra	0–1	(Czech Republic) FC Fastav Zlín	Nitra
14:30 CET				Stadium: Štadión pod Zoborom

8 February 2020 Friendly	FC Nitra	2–1	FK Rakytovce	Nitra
18:00 CET	Galbayev 9'; Fabiš 62'			Stadium: Štadión pod Zoborom

== Competitions ==
=== Slovak First Football League ===
==== League tables ====
===== Regular stage =====
Pos	Team	Pld	W	D	L	GF	GA	GD	Pts	Qualification
1	Slovan Bratislava	22	17	4	1	46	11	+35	55	Qualification for the championship group
2	Žilina	22	13	6	3	38	17	+21	45	Qualification for the championship group
3	DAC Dunajská Streda	22	11	5	6	31	25	+6	38	Qualification for the championship group
4	Spartak Trnava	22	9	3	10	25	26	−1	30	Qualification for the championship group
5	Zemplín Michalovce	22	8	6	8	28	32	−4	30	Qualification for the championship group
6	Ružomberok	22	6	10	6	25	27	−2	28	Qualification for the championship group
7	Trenčín	22	7	6	9	39	35	+4	27	Qualification for the relegation group
8	Zlaté Moravce	22	6	8	8	22	28	−6	26	Qualification for the relegation group
9	Senica	22	6	6	10	24	33	−9	24	Qualification for the relegation group
10	Sereď	22	5	7	10	23	34	−11	22	Qualification for the relegation group
11	Nitra	22	5	4	13	17	31	−14	19	Qualification for the relegation group
12	Pohronie	22	3	7	12	19	38	−19	16	Qualification for the relegation group

Source: Niké liga (in Slovak)
Rules for classification: 1) Points; 2) Head-to-head points; 3) Head-to-head goal difference; 4) Head-to-head away goals scored; 5) Play-off.

===== Relegation group =====
Pos	Team	Pld	W	D	L	GF	GA	GD	Pts	Qualification or relegation
7	Trenčín	27	11	6	10	52	43	+9	39	Qualification for the Europa League play-offs
8	Zlaté Moravce	27	8	9	10	27	33	−6	33	
9	Sereď	27	6	9	12	29	41	−12	27	
10	Senica	27	6	8	13	26	40	−14	26	
11	Pohronie	27	6	8	13	25	44	−19	26	
12	Nitra	27	7	4	16	23	36	−13	25	Qualification for the relegation play-offs

Source: Niké liga (in Slovak)
Rules for classification: 1) Points; 2) Head-to-head points; 3) Head-to-head goal difference; 4) Head-to-head away goals scored; 5) Play-off.

==== Regular stage ====
Win Draw Loss Fixtures

21 July 2019 1	MFK Ružomberok	1-0	FC Nitra	Ružomberok
19:00 CEST	Maslo (yellow card) 48'; Takáč 90'; Regáli (yellow card) 90'	Report	Podhorin (yellow card) 39'; Kuník (yellow card) 53'; Štefanec (yellow card) 90'	Stadium: Štadión pod Čebraťom; Attendance: 1,530; Referee: Dušan Sedlák

27 July 2019 2	FC Nitra	0–1	ViOn Zlaté Moravce	Nitra
18:15 CEST	Chobot (yellow card) 21'; Vrábel (yellow card) 38'; Kuník (yellow card) 58'; Fábry (yellow card) 60'; Gatarić (yellow card) 83'	Report	Tóth (yellow card) 18'; Pintér (yellow card) 38'; Vrábel 45+1' (o.g.); Chren (yellow card) 61'; Pindroch (yellow card) 74'	Stadium: Štadión pod Zoborom; Attendance: 714; Referee: Martin Dohál

4 August 2019 3	Spartak Trnava	2–0	FC Nitra	Trnava
18:00 CEST	Mesík 3'; Diogo (yellow card) 65'; Tešija (yellow card) 77'; Sobczyk 87'	Report	Kuník (yellow card) 43'; Gatarić (yellow card) 70'; Farkaš (yellow card) 86'	Stadium: Anton Malatinský Stadium; Attendance: 3,281; Referee: Ivan Kružliak

10 August 2019 4	FC Nitra	3–2	ŠKF Sereď	Nitra
19:00 CEST	Chobot 30'; Ristovski 49', 67' (pen.); Fábry (yellow card) 87'; Faško (yellow card) 90'	Report	Ventúra (yellow card) 25'; Michalík (yellow card) 57'; Djiby Ba (yellow card) 66' (yellow-red card) 90'; Špehar 75'; Jureškin 78'	Stadium: Štadión pod Zoborom; Attendance: 874; Referee: Dušan Sedlák

17 August 2019 5	MŠK Žilina	3-0	FC Nitra	Žilina
19:00 CEST	Bernát 17', 36'; Díaz (yellow card) 77'; Ďuriš 83'	Report	Podhorin (yellow card) 65'; Farkaš (yellow card) 72'	Stadium: Štadión pod Dubňom; Attendance: 2,661; Referee: Peter Kráľovič

25 August 2019 6	FC Nitra	1-2	DAC Dunajská Streda	Nitra
19:15 CEST	Vrábel (yellow card) 22'; Ristovski 38'; Šefčík (yellow card) 90'	Report	Koštrna 39'; Fábry (yellow card) 43' (goal) 56'; Taiwo (yellow card) 58'; Jedlička (yellow card) 75'; Beskorovainyi (yellow card) 76'; Vida (yellow card) 89'	Stadium: Štadión pod Zoborom; Attendance: 2,155; Referee: Pavol Chmura

1 September 2019 7	AS Trenčín	2-2	FC Nitra	Trenčín
19:00 CEST	Koolwijk 19'; Čataković 31'; Roguljić (yellow card) 42'; Šulek (yellow card) 69'; Julien (yellow card) 83'	Report	Vrábel (yellow card) 40'; Kuník (yellow card) 48'; Kuník (yellow card) 69'; Chobot 52'; Ristovski 57'	Stadium: Štadión Sihoť; Attendance: 415; Referee: Ivan Kružliak

14 September 2019 8	FK Pohronie	0-3	FC Nitra	Žiar nad Hronom
14:00 CEST	Hrnčár (yellow card) 55'; Sedláček (yellow card) 72'	Report	Šefčík 12'; Vrábel (yellow card) 20' (goal) 30'; Ristovski 66'	Stadium: Mestský štadión Attendance: 1,510; Referee: Michal Očenáš

21 September 2019 9	FC Nitra	0-2	MFK Zemplín Michalovce	Nitra
19:00 CEST	Šefčík (yellow card) 44'; Farkaš (yellow card) 52'	Report	Pedrito (yellow card) 55'; Carrillo (yellow card) 59'; Pino 61'; Savvidis (yellow card) 83'; Modibo Sidibé 90'	Stadium: Štadión pod Zoborom; Attendance: 650; Referee: Boris Marhefka

28 September 2019 10	Slovan Bratislava	5-0	FC Nitra	Bratislava
19:00 CEST	Holman 39', 40' (penalty missed) 53 53'; Strelec 67'; Nono 86'	Report	Gatarić (yellow card) 42'	Stadium: Tehelné pole Attendance: 560; Referee: Peter Ziemba

5 October 2019 11	FC Nitra	1-4	FK Senica	Nitra
17:00 CEST	Podhorin (yellow card) 37'; Yenne 51' (o.g.)	Report	Sulley 11'; El Moudane 35'; Castañeda (yellow card) 55' (goal) 78'; Didiba 63'	Stadium: Štadión pod Zoborom; Attendance: 586; Referee: Jozef Pavlík

19 October 2019 12	FC Nitra	1-2	MFK Ružomberok	Nitra
17:00 CEST	Podhorin (yellow card) 50'; Chobot 71' (yellow card) 81'; Farkaš (yellow card) 76'	Report	Farkaš 38' (o.g.); Twardzik 73' (pen.); Takáč (yellow card) 90'	Stadium: Štadión pod Zoborom; Attendance: 518; Referee: Ivan Kružliak

26 October 2019 13	ViOn Zlaté Moravce	1-0	FC Nitra	Zlaté Moravce
17:00 CET	Kovaľ 48'; Grozdanovski (yellow card) 89'	Report	Šefčík (yellow card) 55'; Ristovski (yellow card) 82'	Stadium: ViOn Aréna; Attendance: 1,680; Referee: Peter Kráľovič

2 November 2019 14	FC Nitra	1-0	Spartak Trnava	Nitra
16:00 CET	Fabiš (yellow card) 31'; Ristovski 39' (yellow card) 39'; Bilovský (yellow card) 75'; Farkaš (yellow card) 84'	Report	Lovat (yellow card) 75'; Grendel (yellow card) 90'	Stadium: Štadión pod Zoborom; Attendance: 746; Referee: Pavol Chmura

9 November 2019 15	ŠKF Sereď	0-1	FC Nitra	Myjava
17:00 CET		Report	Ristovski 73'; Bilovský (yellow card) 86'	Stadium: Stadium Myjava; Attendance: 224; Referee: Jozef Pavlík
Note: The match was played at the stadium in Myjava because the home team's stadium did not meet the required criteria.

23 November 2019 16	FC Nitra	0-0	MŠK Žilina	Nitra
14:00 CET	Bilovský (yellow card) 79'	Report		Stadium: Štadión pod Zoborom; Attendance: 867; Referee: Dušan Sedlák

30 November 2019 17	DAC Dunajská Streda	1-0	FC Nitra	Dunajská Streda
13:30 CET	Davis (penalty missed) 59; Divković 63'	Report		Stadium: MOL Aréna; Attendance: 7,189; Referee: Peter Kráľovič

7 December 2019 18	FC Nitra	1-1	AS Trenčín	Nitra
14:00 CET	Ristovski (penalty missed) 14 74'; Fabiš (yellow card) 53'; Faško (yellow card) 56'	Report	Roguljić (yellow card) 13'; Križan (yellow card) 18'; Depetris 77'	Stadium: Štadión pod Zoborom; Attendance: 786; Referee: Michal Očenáš

15 February 2020 19	FC Nitra	0-0	FK Pohronie	Nitra
14:00 CEST	Faško (yellow card) 22'; Javorčić (yellow card) 60'	Report	Abrahám (yellow card) 90'	Stadium: Štadión pod Zoborom; Attendance: 1,376; Referee: Peter Kráľovič

22 February 2020 20	Zemplín Michalovce	1-0	FC Nitra	Michalovce
14:00 CEST	Kvocera 20'; Savvidis (yellow card) 42' (yellow-red card) 90'; Kolesár (yellow card) 82'	Report	Farkaš (red card) 90'	Stadium: Mestský futbalový štadión Attendance: 1,204; Referee: Michal Smolák

1 March 2020 21	FC Nitra	0-1	Slovan Bratislava	Nitra
15:30 CEST	Gatarić (yellow card) 61'	Report	Moha 56'	Stadium: Štadión pod Zoborom; Attendance: 2,670; Referee: Erik Gemzický

7 March 2020 22	FK Senica	0-3	FC Nitra	Senica
15:30 CEST	Moses (yellow card) 37'; Didiba (yellow card) 51'; Cascardo (yellow card) 74'; Addo (red card) 81'; Totka (yellow card) 87'; Akinyoola (yellow card) 89'	Report	Vrábel (yellow card) 38' (goal) 45+1'; Ristovski 50'; Magda (yellow card) 53'; Da Silva (yellow card) 68'; Chobot 90'	Stadium: OMS Arena; Attendance: 783; Referee: Dušan Sedlák

==== Relegation group ====
Win Draw Loss Fixtures

13 June 2020 23/1	ViOn Zlaté Moravce	2-1	FC Nitra	Zlaté Moravce
17:00 CEST	Kovaľ 23'; Richtárech (yellow card) 60'; Mészáros (yellow card) 65'; Cmiljanić 77'; Orávik (yellow card) 88'	Report	Šefčík 12' (yellow card) 47'; Chobot (yellow card) 56'	Stadium: ViOn Aréna; Attendance: 332; Referee: Pavol Chmura

20 June 2020 24/2	FC Nitra	2-0	FK Senica	Nitra
17:00 CEST	Vrábel (yellow card) 6'; Niemchaninov (yellow card) 34'; Šefčík 59'; Ristovski 83'; Hambálek (yellow card) 86'; Magda (yellow card) 90'	Report	Moses (yellow card) 45'; Vorel (yellow card) 61'	Stadium: Štadión pod Zoborom; Attendance: 285; Referee: Boris Marhefka

27 June 2020 25/3	ŠKF Sereď	1-0	FC Nitra	Zlaté Moravce
17:00 CEST	Iván (yellow card) 32'; Špehar 47'	Report		Stadium: ViOn Aréna; Attendance: 298; Referee: Peter Kráľovič
Note: The match was played at the stadium in Zlaté Moravce because the home team's stadium did not meet the required criteria.

4 July 2020 26/4	FC Nitra	0-2	FK Pohronie	Nitra
18:00 CEST	Vrábel (yellow card) 21' (yellow-red card) 43'; Jesus (yellow card) 60'; Faško (yellow card) 68'	Report	Chríbik (yellow card) 22'; Pavlík 52' (yellow card) 53'; Župa (yellow card) 62'; Fadera 64' (yellow card) 82' (yellow-red card) 88'; Jacko (yellow card) 82'; Weir (yellow card) 90'	Stadium: Štadión pod Zoborom; Attendance: 1,255; Referee: Ivan Kružliak

11 July 2020 27/5	AS Trenčín	0-3	FC Nitra	Senica
18:00 CEST	Nielson (yellow card) 48'; Mazanovský (yellow card) 57'	Report	Faško 68'; Ristovski 74'; Podhorin 78'	Stadium: OMS Arena; Attendance: 253; Referee: Michal Očenáš
Note: The match was played at the stadium in Senica.

==== Relegation play-offs ====
The team placed bottom of the relegation group faced the first-placed team from the 2. Liga 2019–20 for a place in the league for the next season.

===== First leg =====
14 July 2020
17:00 CEST

FK Dubnica	0–0	FC Nitra
Jakúbek (yellow card) 75'	Report	Faško (yellow card) 78'

Mestský futbalový štadión, Dubnica nad Váhom
Attendance: 2,456 (Note: Due to the COVID-19 pandemic, a maximum of 50% of the stadium's capacity was available for sporting events.)
Referee: Michal Smolák

===== Second leg =====
17 July 2020
20:00 CEST

FC Nitra	3–0	FK Dubnica
Kóša 8'; Ristovski 20' (pen.); Šípoš (yellow card) 89'; Hambálek 90'; Fabiš (yellow card) 90'	Report	Janco (yellow card) 20'; Václav (yellow card) 75' (yellow-red card) 84'

Štadión pod Zoborom, Nitra
Attendance: 3,057
Referee: Peter Kralovic

=== Slovak Cup ===
Win Loss Fixtures

13 August 2019 2R	OFK 1948 Veľký Lapáš	2–7	FC Nitra	Veľký Lapáš
	Béger 8', 89'	Report	Štefanec 3' *Šefčík 14' *Fábry 20' *Guláš 40', 56', 67' *Remeň 87'	Stadium: Veľký Lapáš Stadium; Attendance: 700; Referee: Ladislav Prešinský

10 September 2019 3R	TJ Veľké Lovce	0–7	FC Nitra	Veľké Lovce
	Krčmár (yellow card) 45' *Bašťovanský (yellow card) 80'	Report	Guláš 12' *Gatarić 24' *Fábry 28', 87' *Faško 43' (pen.), 45' *Tancík 76'	Stadium: Veľké Lovce Stadium; Attendance: 350; Referee: Martin Dohál

24 September 2019 4R	KFC Komarno	0–2	FC Nitra	Komárno
	Szalai (yellow card) 33' *Šimko (yellow card) 73'	Report	Podhorin 30' *Gatarić (yellow card) 49' *Šurnovský (yellow card) 50' *Šimončič (yellow card) 83' *Ristovski 86'	Stadium: KFC Komárno Stadium; Attendance: 472; Referee: Ľuboš Kačenga

30 October 2019 R16	FC Nitra	3–2	Liptovský Mikuláš	Nitra
	Ristovski 29' (pen.), 86' *Gatarić 63'	Report	Bartoš 20' *Kotora 77' *Čery (red card) 82'	Stadium: Štadión pod Zoborom; Attendance: 237; Referee: Erik Gemzický

4 March 2020 QF	FC Nitra	1–2 (4–5 p)	ViOn Zlaté Moravce	Nitra
	Faško 18' (pen.) *Podhorin (yellow card) 86'	Report	Pindroch (yellow card) 17' *Ďubek 21' (pen.) *Duga (yellow card) 58' *Brašeň (yellow card) 83'	Stadium: Štadión pod Zoborom; Attendance: 816; Referee: Peter Kráľovič

== Statistics ==
=== Goalscorers ===
Rank	No.	Pos.	Nat.	Player	First League	Slovak Cup	Total
1	77	FW	(North Macedonia)	Milan Ristovski	12	3	15
2	16	MF	(Slovakia)	Marián Chobot	4	0	4
2	21	MF	(Slovakia)	Samuel Šefčík	3	1	4
2	8	MF	(Slovakia)	Michal Faško	1	3	4
2	12	FW	(Slovakia)	Dominik Guláš	0	4	4
3	9	FW	(Slovakia)	Marek Fábry	0	3	3
4	19	MF	(Slovakia)	Ondrej Vrábel	2	0	2
4	20	DF	(Slovakia)	Oliver Podhorin	1	1	2
4	25	MF	(Croatia)	Nikola Gatarić	0	2	2
5	5	DF	(Slovakia)	Sebastian Kóša	1	0	1
5	15	MF	(Slovakia)	Tomáš Hambálek	1	0	1
5	7	MF	(Slovakia)	Jakub Tancík	0	1	1
5	17	MF	(Slovakia)	Viktor Remeň	0	1	1
5	98	MF	(Slovakia)	Šimon Štefanec	0	1	1
Own goals					1	0	0
Totals					26	20	46
