= 2018–19 FC Nitra season =

Slovak football club season

FC Nitra
2018–19 season
- Owner: FC Nitra a. s.
- Chairman: Marián Valenta
- Head Coach: Ivan Galád (until 13 March); Michal Kuruc (from 13 March)
- Stadium: Štadión pod Zoborom, Nitra
- Slovak 1st League: 9th
- Slovak Cup: Quarter-finals
- Top goalscorer: League: Tomáš Vestenický (10); All: Tomáš Vestenický (10)
- Highest home attendance: 6,068 vs DAC Dunajská Streda (First League, 5 August 2018)
- Lowest home attendance: 272 vs Liptovský Mikuláš (Slovak Cup, 23 October 2018)
- Biggest win: 7–0 vs Dvory nad Žitavou (Slovak Cup, 5 September 2018)
- Biggest defeat: 1–5 vs FK Senica (Slovak Cup, 12 March 2019)
Home colours	Away colours

The 2018–19 season was FC Nitra's second consecutive season in the top division of Slovak football. The club finished seventh in the regular season and subsequently competed in the relegation group, where it finished ninth overall.

The club changed its head coach once during the season due to unsatisfactory results.

Extensive renovation work was carried out at the stadium during 2018 and was completed in September of that year, bringing its capacity to 7,246 seats.

In the Slovak Cup, the club reached the quarter-finals, where it was defeated by FK Senica.

== First-team squad ==
As of 31 June 2019

Note: Flags indicate national team as defined under FIFA eligibility rules; some limited exceptions apply. Players may hold more than one non-FIFA nationality.

No.	Pos.	Nation	Player
1	GK	SVK	Dávid Šípoš
2	DF	SVK	Lukáš Fabiš
3	DF	CMR	Macdonald Niba
5	DF	SVK	Richard Križan
6	MF	SVK	Tomáš Kóňa (captain)
7	MF	SVK	Peter Šútorík
7	MF	SVK	Šimon Štefanec
8	FW	SRB	Nemanja Soković
9	MF	SVK	Róbert Valenta
10	MF	SVK	Andrej Fábry
10	MF	SVK	Frederik Bilovský
11	DF	SVK	Ján Chovanec
12	FW	SVK	Dominik Guláš
13	MF	SVK	René Kotrík
13	DF	CRO	Ivan Zgrablić
14	MF	SVK	Miloš Šimončič (captain)
16	FW	SVK	Marián Chobot
17	DF	SVK	Jaroslav Machovec

No.	Pos.	Nation	Player
18	FW	NGR	Abdulrahman Taiwo
19	MF	SVK	Martin Macho
19	MF	SVK	Ondrej Vrábel
19	FW	SVK	Patrik Danek
20	FW	SVK	Marek Fábry
22	DF	SVK	Matúš Kuník
24	FW	SVK	Tomáš Vestenický
25	MF	CRO	Nikola Gatarić
25	DF	SVK	Dominik Straňák
26	DF	SVK	Pavol Farkaš (captain)
27	DF	SVK	Marek Dubeň
29	FW	SVK	Christián Steinhübel
31	GK	SVK	Lukáš Hroššo
31	GK	SVK	Branislav Pindroch
32	GK	SVK	Erik Búš
44	FW	UKR	Illya Cherednychenko
66	MF	SVK	Márius Charizopulos
97	DF	SVK	Patrik Šurnovský

== Coaching staff ==
As of 31 June 2019

Staff	Job title
(Slovakia) Ivan Galád	Manager (until 13 March)
(Slovakia) Michal Kuruc	Manager (from 13 March)
(Slovakia) Michal Kuruc	Assistant manager (until 13 March)
(Slovakia) Rastislav Božik	Assistant manager
(Slovakia) Miroslav König	Goalkeeping coach
(Slovakia) Ivan Štefanov	Team Doctor
(Slovakia) Milan Michalčin	Team Doctor
(Slovakia) Róbert Gyepes	Physiotherapist
(Slovakia) Štefan Balla	Physiotherapist
(Slovakia) Michal Lacena	Physiotherapist

== Transfers and contracts ==
=== In ===
Date from	Pos.	Nationality	Player	From	Fee	Ref.
25 July 2018	DF	(Slovakia)	Marek Dubeň	(Slovakia) MFK Zvolen	Free	
3 August 2018	FW	(Ukraine)	Illya Cherednychenko	(Slovakia) Spartak Trnava	Free	
31 January 2019	FW	(Serbia)	Nemanja Soković	(Serbia) Cement Beočin	Free	
6 February 2019	MF	(Slovakia)	Frederik Bilovský	(Czech Republic) Dukla Prague	Free	
7 February 2019	GK	(Slovakia)	Branislav Pindroch	(England) Notts County	Free	
8 February 2019	DF	(Croatia)	Ivan Zgrablić	(Romania) Voluntari	Free	
15 February 2019	MF	(Croatia)	Nikola Gatarić	(Slovakia) ŠKF Sereď	Free	

=== Out ===
Date from	Pos.	Nationality	Player	To	Fee	Ref.
10 July 2018	FW	(Armenia)	Vahagn Militosyan	(Slovakia) ŠKF Sereď	Free	
16 July 2018	FW	(Slovakia)	Patrik Abrahám	(Slovakia) MFK Skalica	Free	
16 July 2018	DF	(Slovakia)	Samuel Ďurek	(Slovakia) FC Petržalka	Free	
25 July 2018	DF	(Czech Republic)	Ondřej Vencl	(Austria) SV Horn	Free	
26 July 2018	DF	(France)	Aurélien Ngeyitala	(Ukraine) FC Arsenal Kyiv	Free	
25 January 2019	FW	(Nigeria)	Abdulrahman Taiwo	(Slovakia) DAC Dunajská Streda	Free	
30 January 2019	MF	(Slovakia)	René Kotrík	(Slovakia) Lehota pod Vtáčnikom	Free	
4 February 2019	MF	(Slovakia)	Andrej Fábry	(Czech Republic) FK Jablonec	€480,000	
4 February 2019	GK	(Slovakia)	Lukáš Hroššo	(Poland) Zagłębie Sosnowiec	Free	
5 February 2019	DF	(Slovakia)	Richard Križan	(Hungary) Puskás Akadémia FC	Free	

=== Loans in ===
Date from	Pos.	Nationality	Player	From	Until	Ref.
24 July 2018	FW	(Slovakia)	Tomáš Vestenický	(Poland) KS Cracovia	30 June 2019	
19 January 2019	MF	(Slovakia)	Šimon Štefanec	(Slovakia) Hellas Verona	17 July 2020	
3 August 2018	MF	(Slovakia)	Ondrej Vrábel	(Slovakia) OFK Bošany	30 June 2019	
4 August 2018	DF	(Slovakia)	Dominik Straňák	(Slovakia) FC Veľký Kýr	30 June 2019	

=== Loans out ===
Date from	Pos.	Nationality	Player	To	Until	Ref.
19 July 2018	MF	(Slovakia)	Patrik Šurnovský	(Slovakia) KFC Komárno	31 January 2019	
5 March 2019	MF	(Slovakia)	Róbert Valenta	(Slovakia) FC Pata	30 June 2019	

== Friendlies ==
Win Draw Loss

=== Pre-season ===
23 June 2018 Friendly	Inter Bratislava	2–2	FC Nitra	Jaslovské Bohunice
11:00 CEST	Petráš 27'; Macdonald Niba 77' (o.g.)		Taiwo 3', 29'	Stadium: Štadión Jaslovské Bohunice

26 June 2018 Friendly	(Czech Republic) SFC Opava	2–3	FC Nitra	Opava
15:00 CEST	Smola 13'; Jurečka 24' (pen.)	Report	Vestenický 41'; Chobot 52'; Taiwo 83'	Stadium: Stadion v Městských sadech

30 June 2018 Friendly	FC Nitra	3–0	(Czech Republic) Zbrojovka Brno	Pata
16:00 CEST	Taiwo 3', 28'; Fábry 78'	Report		Stadium: Pata Stadium

4 July 2018 Friendly	(Hungary) Honvéd Budapest	2–0	FC Nitra	Budapest
17:00 CEST	Pölöskei 17'; Nagy 65'	Report		Stadium: Bozsik József Stadion; Attendance: 200; Referee: Jakab Géza

7 July 2018 Friendly	(Hungary) MTK Budapest	3–3	FC Nitra	Budapest
16:00 CEST	Lencse 4'; Kanta 11' (pen.); Kulcsár 4'		Taiwo 37', 90+2'; Fábry 79'	Stadium: Hidegkuti Nándor Stadion

14 July 2018 Friendly	(Israel) Kiryat Shmona	0–1	FC Nitra	Šamorín
18:00 CEST			A. Fábry 39'	Stadium: X-Bionic Sphere; Referee: Andrej Chromý

21 July 2018 Friendly	FC Nitra	3–1	(Hungary) Dorogi FC	Dolné Obdokovce
17:00 CEST	Vestenický 18'; A. Fábry 65'; Charizopulos 88'	Report	Hegedűs 78'	Stadium: Dolné Obdokovce Stadium; Attendance: 400

=== Mid-season ===
12 January 2019 2019 Tipsport liga	FC Nitra	1–3	(Czech Republic) Zbrojovka Brno	Brno-Líšeň
10:30 CET	Vestenický 63'	Report	Bariš 20'; Magera 44' (pen.); Vintr 90+1'	Stadium: Stadion SK Líšeň

13 January 2019 2019 Tipsport liga	(Czech Republic) FC Táborsko	0–1	FC Nitra	Brno-Líšeň
10:30 CET		Report	Taiwo 35'	Stadium: Stadion SK Líšeň; Referee: Pavel Julínek

16 January 2019 2019 Tipsport liga	FC Nitra	4–4	(Czech Republic) 1. SC Znojmo FK	Brno-Líšeň
10:30 CET	Vestenický 16', 45' (pen.); Taiwo 62'; Danek 79'	Report	Teplý 24', 90'; Chereda 29'; Helísek 42'	Stadium: Stadion SK Líšeň; Referee: Radek Dubravský

19 January 2019 Friendly	(Czech Republic) FC Fastav Zlín	5–0	FC Nitra	Zlín
13:00 CET	Vyhnal 15'; Hronek 17'; Slamena 51', 56'; Džafić 58'	Report		Stadium: Letná Stadion

26 January 2019 Friendly	FC Nitra	3–1	(Hungary) Vác FC	Nitra
14:00 CET	Soković 32'; Valenta 55'; Danek 76'	Report	Hegedűs 60'	Stadium: Štadión pod Zoborom

2 February 2019 Friendly	FC Nitra	2–1	ŠTK Šamorín	Nitra
14:00 CET	Soković 11'; Vestenický 30'		Peu 85' (pen.)	Stadium: Štadión pod Zoborom

9 February 2019 Friendly	FC Nitra	1–2	(Czech Republic) Zbrojovka Brno	Nitra
14:00 CET	Vestenický 65'	Report	Přichystal 6'; Bartolomeu 78'	Stadium: Štadión pod Zoborom; Referee: Richard Sedlár

== Competitions ==
=== Slovak First Football League ===
==== League tables ====
===== Regular stage =====
Pos	Team	Pld	W	D	L	GF	GA	GD	Pts	Qualification
1	Slovan Bratislava	22	18	4	0	53	18	+35	58	Qualification for the championship group
2	Žilina	22	13	5	4	39	23	+16	44	Qualification for the championship group
3	DAC Dunajská Streda	22	13	5	4	42	27	+15	44	Qualification for the championship group
4	Ružomberok	22	9	9	4	34	20	+14	36	Qualification for the championship group
5	Zemplín Michalovce	22	9	5	8	29	33	−4	32	Qualification for the championship group
6	Sereď	22	9	4	9	27	29	−2	31	Qualification for the championship group
7	Nitra	22	7	5	10	27	30	−3	26	Qualification for the relegation group
8	Spartak Trnava	22	7	4	11	28	28	0	25	Qualification for the relegation group
9	Trenčín	22	6	4	12	30	40	−10	22	Qualification for the relegation group
10	Železiarne Podbrezová	22	6	3	13	22	35	−13	21	Qualification for the relegation group
11	Senica	22	3	6	13	20	43	−23	15	Qualification for the relegation group
12	ViOn Zlaté Moravce	22	4	2	16	19	44	−25	14	Qualification for the relegation group

Source: Niké liga (in Slovak)
Rules for classification: 1) Points; 2) Head-to-head points; 3) Head-to-head goal difference; 4) Head-to-head away goals scored; 5) Play-off.

===== Relegation group =====
Pos	Team	Pld	W	D	L	GF	GA	GD	Pts	Qualification or relegation
7	Spartak Trnava	32	10	8	14	35	35	0	38	Qualification for the Europa League first qualifying round
8	Senica	32	10	7	15	42	53	−11	37	
9	Nitra	32	8	10	14	42	48	−6	34	
10	ViOn Zlaté Moravce	32	10	4	18	33	55	−22	34	
11	Trenčín	32	8	7	17	41	56	−15	31	Qualification for the relegation play-offs
12	Železiarne Podbrezová	32	7	8	17	28	48	−20	29	Relegation to the 2. Liga

Source: Niké liga (in Slovak)
Rules for classification: 1) Points; 2) Head-to-head points; 3) Head-to-head goal difference; 4) Head-to-head away goals scored; 5) Play-off.

==== Regular stage ====
Win Draw Loss Fixtures

28 July 2018 2	MŠK Žilina	2–1	FC Nitra	Žilina
18:30 CEST	Škvarka 13'; Boženík 54'; Káčer (yellow card) 66'; Holúbek (yellow card) 79'	Report	Fábry 32' (yellow card) 71'; Križan (yellow card) 45'	Stadium: Štadión pod Dubňom; Attendance: 2,036; Referee: Michal Smolák
Note: FC Nitra began its league campaign in the second round, as its first-round match was postponed due to the opposition's commitments in another competition.

5 August 2018 3	FC Nitra	2–3	DAC Dunajská Streda	Nitra
19:00 CEST	Kóňa (yellow card) 17'; Šimončič (yellow card) 38' (goal) 45'; Vestenický 58'; Taiwo (yellow card) 82'	Report	Herc (yellow card) 51'; Pačinda 65'; Bayo 69'; Kalmár (yellow card) 84'; Taiwo 90' (o.g.)	Stadium: Štadión pod Zoborom; Attendance: 6,068; Referee: Ivan Kružliak

12 August 2018 4	Slovan Bratislava	1–1	FC Nitra	Bratislava
19:00 CEST	Šporar 88'	Report	Taiwo 44'; Fábry (yellow card) 74'; Hroššo (yellow card) 88'	Stadium: Tehelné pole Attendance: 1,152; Referee: Dušan Sedlák

18 August 2018 5	FC Nitra	0-0	Spartak Trnava	Nitra
16:45 CEST	Farkaš (yellow card) 38'; Kuník (yellow card) 55'; Križan (yellow card) 58'; Taiwo (yellow card) 68'	Report	Čonka (yellow card) 90'	Stadium: Štadión pod Zoborom; Attendance: 4,323; Referee: Jozef Pavlík

25 August 2018 6	FK Senica	1-1	FC Nitra	Senica
19:00 CEST	Petshi 84'	Report	Fábry 58'; Machovec (yellow card) 75'	Stadium: OMS Arena; Attendance: 759; Referee: Michal Smolák

1 September 2018 7	FC Nitra	4-1	ViOn Zlaté Moravce	Nitra
19:09 CEST	Vestenický 21', 82', 85'; Križan 48'	Report	Udeh (yellow card) 30' (goal) 33'; Duga (yellow card) 42'	Stadium: Štadión pod Zoborom; Attendance: 2,324; Referee: Patrik Hrčka

15 September 2018 8	Železiarne Podbrezová	3-2	FC Nitra	Podbrezová
14:00 CEST	Leško 23' (yellow card) 49'; Obročník 29'; Kuciak (yellow card) 58'; Viazanko (yellow card) 63'; Mikuš (penalty missed) 85; Więzik 86'	Report	Vestenický 18' (pen.); Križan (yellow card) 52'; Fábry 64'; Farkaš (yellow card) 71' (yellow-red card) 84'	Stadium: ZELPO Aréna; Attendance: 1,128; Referee: Ivan Kružliak

22 September 2018 9	FC Nitra	2-1	Zemplín Michalovce	Nitra
18:00 CEST	Kóňa 36'; Šimončič 76'; Križan (yellow card) 87'	Report	Turík 28' (yellow card) 63'; Vaščák (yellow card) 86'; Beskorovaynyi (yellow card) 87'	Stadium: Štadión pod Zoborom; Attendance: 1,355; Referee: Jozef Pavlík

25 September 2018 1	FC Nitra	2-1	AS Trenčín	Nitra
18:00 CEST	Kóňa 4'; Chovanec (yellow card) 63'; Steinhübel (yellow card) 83'; Šimončič 90' (pen.)	Report	Paur (yellow card) 29' (yellow-red card) 40'; Mance 58'	Stadium: Štadión pod Zoborom; Attendance: 1,289; Referee: Ivan Kružliak
Note: FC Nitra began its league campaign in the second round, as its first-round match was postponed due to the opposition's commitments in another competition.

29 September 2018 10	ŠKF Sereď	2-1	FC Nitra	Nitra
16:00 CEST	Križan 39' (o.g.); Sus (yellow card) 66'; Pankaričan (yellow card) 69'; Adekuoroye 87'	Report	Vestenický 6'; Križan (yellow card) 20'; Charizopulos (yellow card) 89'	Stadium: Štadión pod Zoborom; Attendance: 846; Referee: Peter Ziemba
Note: The match was played at the stadium in Nitra because the home team's stadium did not meet the required criteria.

6 October 2018 11	MFK Ružomberok	3-1	FC Nitra	Ružomberok
16:00 CEST	Tandir 10'; Gál-Andrezly 42' (yellow card) 90'; Mustedanagić 90'	Report	Vestenický 7'; Hroššo (yellow card) 87'; Charizopulos (yellow card) 90'	Stadium: Štadión pod Čebraťom; Attendance: 1,325; Referee: Dušan Sedlák

20 October 2018 12	AS Trenčín	0-1	FC Nitra	Trenčín
17:00 CEST	Kleščík (yellow card) 47' (yellow-red card) 71'; Skovajsa (yellow card) 76'; Farkaš (yellow card) 76'	Report	Taiw 20'; Šimončič (yellow card) 24'; Cherednychenko (yellow card) 64'; Niba (yellow card) 72'; Charizopulos (yellow card) 90'	Stadium: Štadión Sihoť; Attendance: 411; Referee: Pavol Chmura

27 October 2018 13	FC Nitra	0-2	MŠK Žilina	Nitra
17:00 CET	Taiwo (yellow card) 51'	Report	Boženík 17', 34'; Sluka (yellow card) 76'	Stadium: Štadión pod Zoborom; Attendance: 1,236; Referee: Jozef Pavlík

3 November 2018 14	DAC Dunajská Streda	1-0	FC Nitra	Dunajská Streda
17:00 CET	Vida 30'; Jedlička (yellow card) 90'	Report	Kuník (yellow card) 43'; Kóňa (yellow card) 60'; Fábry (yellow card) 66'	Stadium: MOL Aréna; Attendance: 8,474; Referee: Patrik Hrčka

11 November 2018 15	FC Nitra	1-2	Slovan Bratislava	Nitra
15:00 CET	Križan (yellow card) 27'; Kóňa (yellow card) 39' (yellow-red card) 82'; Hroššo (yellow card) 45'; Fábry 45+1' (yellow card) 58'; Niba (yellow card) 60' (red card) 86'	Report	Šporar (yellow card) 27' (yellow-red card) 60' (goal) 37' (pen.); Holman (yellow card) 45'; Ljubičić (yellow card) 72'; Bozhikov (yellow card) 90'; Moha (yellow card) 90'	Stadium: Štadión pod Zoborom; Attendance: 2,412; Referee: Pavol Chmura

24 November 2018 16	Spartak Trnava	2-3	FC Nitra	Trnava
14:00 CET	Ghorbani (yellow card) 38'; Grendel (yellow card) 42' (yellow-red card) 90'; Chanturishvili 55' (yellow card) 90'; Yilmaz 57'; Kulhánek (yellow card) 86'	Report	Janso 6' (o.g.); Fábry (yellow card) 55'; Machovec (yellow card) 63' (goal) 90'; Taiwo 90'	Stadium: Anton Malatinský Stadium; Attendance: 2,575; Referee: Peter Ziemba

1 December 2018 17	FC Nitra	1-0	FK Senica	Nitra
14:00 CET	Kuník 17'	Report	Kay (yellow card) 61'; Deretti (yellow card) 77'	Stadium: Štadión pod Zoborom; Attendance: 412; Referee: Michal Smolák

8 December 2018 18	ViOn Zlaté Moravce	0-3	FC Nitra	Zlaté Moravce
14:00 CET	Karlík (yellow card) 67'; Chren (yellow card) 71'	Report	Fábry 46', 75', 84'; Križan (yellow card) 56'; Taiwo (yellow card) 59'	Stadium: ViOn Aréna; Attendance: 617; Referee: Michal Smolák

16 February 2019 19	FC Nitra	1-3	Železiarne Podbrezová	Nitra
14:00 CEST	Gatarić 11'; Šimončič (yellow card) 34'; Charizopulos (yellow card) 76'; Fábry (yellow card) 90'	Report	Oravec 32'; Špyrka 58'; Urbanič 90'	Stadium: Štadión pod Zoborom; Attendance: 1,278; Referee: Peter Ziemba

23 February 2019 20	Zemplín Michalovce	0-0	FC Nitra	Michalovce
16:00 CEST	Vojtko (yellow card) 67'; Rota (yellow card) 73'; Carrillo (yellow card) 81'	Report	Gatarić (yellow card) 33'; Zgrablić (yellow card) 44'; Vestenický (yellow card) 78'; Pindroch (yellow card) 90'; Fábry (yellow card) 90'	Stadium: Mestský futbalový štadión Attendance: 827; Referee: Boris Marhefka

2 March 2019 21	FC Nitra	0-2	ŠKF Sereď	Nitra
15:30 CEST	Gatarić (penalty missed) 18; Zgrablić (yellow card) 31'; Charizopulos (yellow card) 72'	Report	Djiby Ba 29'; Machovec 34' (o.g.)	Stadium: Štadión pod Zoborom; Attendance: 1,118; Referee: Michal Smolák

9 March 2019 22	FC Nitra	0-0	MFK Ružomberok	Nitra
14:00 CEST	Gatarić (penalty missed) 70; Niba (red card) 71'	Report	Kružliak (yellow card) 59'; Urdinov (red card) 69'; Macík (yellow card) 79'	Stadium: Štadión pod Zoborom; Attendance: 912; Referee: Jozef Pavlík

==== Relegation group ====
Win Draw Loss Fixtures

16 March 2019 23/1	Železiarne Podbrezová	1-1	FC Nitra	Podbrezová
17:00 CEST	Mojžiš (yellow card) 15'; Hlohovský 43'	Report	Charizopulos (yellow card) 28'; Niba (yellow card) 42'; Šimončič (yellow card) 55'; Vestenický 75' (pen.); Kóňa (yellow card) 81'; Šurnovský (yellow card) 82'; Pindroch (yellow card) 90'	Stadium: ZELPO Aréna; Attendance: 668; Referee: Filip Glova

30 March 2019 24/2	FC Nitra	2-2	AS Trenčín	Nitra
16:00 CEST	Soković 9'; Vestenický (yellow card) 30'; Šimončič (yellow card) 57'; Bilovský 60'; Šurnovský (yellow card) 72'	Report	Yem (yellow card) 29'; Čataković 38' (pen.) (yellow card) 72'; Lamine (yellow card) 63'; Paur 78'	Stadium: Štadión pod Zoborom; Attendance: 793; Referee: Filip Glova

6 April 2019 25/3	Spartak Trnava	1-1	FC Nitra	Trnava
17:00 CEST	Yilmaz 51'; Markoski (yellow card) 63'	Report	Machovec (yellow card) 40'; Chobot 54'; Macho (yellow card) 86'; Dubeň (yellow card) 89'	Stadium: Anton Malatinský Stadium; Attendance: 2,013; Referee: Boris Marhefka

13 April 2019 26/4	FK Senica	4-1	FC Nitra	Senica
17:00 CEST	Kay 8'; Asmah 25'; El Moudane 50'; Krč (yellow card) 51'; Castañeda 80'	Report	Farkaš (yellow card) 45'; Vestenický 57'; Kuník (yellow card) 67'; Šimončič (yellow card) 88'	Stadium: OMS Arena; Attendance: 473; Referee: Peter Ziemba

20 April 2019 27/5	FC Nitra	2-2	ViOn Zlaté Moravce	Nitra
18:00 CEST	Bilovský 34'; Machovec (yellow card) 87'; Farkaš (yellow card) 90'; Čögley 90' (o.g.)	Report	Ďubek 1'; Ľupták (yellow card) 37' (goal) 44'; Brašeň (yellow card) 84'; Chovan (yellow card) 90'	Stadium: Štadión pod Zoborom; Attendance: 804; Referee: Michal Očenáš
Note: The match was played at the stadium in Senica.

26 April 2019 28/6	FC Nitra	2-2	Železiarne Podbrezová	Nitra
18:30 CEST	Vestenický 25'; M. Fábry 43'	Report	Leško 17'; Breznanik 20'; Kiwior (yellow card) 83'	Stadium: Štadión pod Zoborom; Attendance: 652; Referee: Peter Kráľovič

4 May 2019 29/7	AS Trenčín	1-4	FC Nitra	Myjava
17:00 CEST	Čataković 10' (yellow card) 57'	Report	Vestenický (yellow card) 11'; Fabiš 34' (yellow card) 71'; Kuník (yellow card) 45'; Bilovský 62'; Chobot 66'; Charizopulos 78'	Stadium: [[Stadium Myjava]] Attendance: 339; Referee: Michal Očenáš
Note: The match was played at the stadium in Myjava because AS Trenčín's home ground was undergoing renovation at the time.

11 May 2019 30/8	FC Nitra	2-3	FK Senica	Nitra
17:00 CEST	Farkaš (yellow card) 24' (goal) 31'; Kóňa 81'; Vrábel (yellow card) 88'; Charizopulos (yellow card) 90'	Report	Ramírez 7', 73'; Dias (yellow card) 33'; El Moudane (yellow card) 39'; Fabiš 41' (o.g.); Kay (yellow card) 67'	Stadium: Štadión pod Zoborom; Attendance: 682; Referee: Peter Ziemba

18 May 2019 31/9	FC Nitra	0-1	Spartak Trnava	Nitra
17:00 CEST	Vestenický (penalty missed) 40	Report	Hing-Glover (yellow card) 39'; Depetris 80'	Stadium: Štadión pod Zoborom; Attendance: 807; Referee: Erik Gemzický

24 May 2019 32/10	ViOn Zlaté Moravce	1-0	FC Nitra	Zlaté Moravce
19:00 CEST	Válovčan 34'; Grozdanovski (yellow card) 85'	Report	Farkaš (yellow card) 37'; Niba (yellow card) 59'; Chobot (yellow card) 78'; Soković (yellow card) 90'	Stadium: ViOn Aréna; Attendance: 2,482; Referee: Michal Očenáš

=== Slovak Cup ===
Win Loss Fixtures

8 August 2018 2R	ŠK Šurany	1–2 (3–5 p)	FC Nitra	Šurany
	Prochaczka (yellow card) 87' *Tvrdoň 90' (yellow card) 90'	Report	Fabiš (yellow card) 26' *Fábry 85'	Stadium: ŠK Šurany Stadium; Attendance: 1,100; Referee: Filip Glova

5 September 2018 3R	Dvory nad Žitavou	0–7	FC Nitra	Dvory nad Žitavou
	Varga (yellow card) 55'	Report	M. Fábry 11', 56' *Cherednychenko (yellow card) 30' (goal) 48' *Machovec 43', 58' *Chobot 62', 68'	Stadium: Dvory nad Žitavou Stadium; Attendance: 450; Referee: Ľuboš Kačenga

10 October 2019 4R	ŠK FC Vydrany	0–3	FC Nitra	Vydrany
	Bondoa (yellow card) 24' *Ďurica (yellow card) 56'	Report	M. Fábry 3' *Kotrík (yellow card) 63' *Taiwo 68' *Cherednychenko (yellow card) 80' *Chobot 90'	Stadium: Štadión Vydrany; Attendance: 1,000; Referee: Martin Dohál

23 October 2018 R16	FC Nitra	3–2 (3–1 p)	Liptovský Mikuláš	Nitra
	Taiwo 28' *Farkaš (yellow card) 39' *Kóňa 62'	Report	Očenáš 10' (pen.) *Čery 27' *Staš (penalty missed) 52 *Janec (yellow card) 68'	Stadium: Štadión pod Zoborom; Attendance: 272; Referee: Martin Dohál

12 March 2019 QF	FK Senica	5–1	FC Nitra	Senica
	Ramírez 14', 35', 42', 45' (yellow card) 14' *El Moudane (yellow card) 17' *Dangubić (yellow card) 37' *Kay (yellow card) 63' (yellow-red card) 79' *Petshi 90'	Report	Bilovský (yellow card) 2' *Gatarić 19' *Charizopulos (yellow card) 58' *Vrábel (yellow card) 71'	Stadium: OMS Arena; Attendance: 638; Referee: Pavol Chmura

== Statistics ==
=== Goalscorers ===
Rank	No.	Pos.	Nat.	Player	First League	Slovak Cup	Total
1	24	FW	(Slovakia)	Tomáš Vestenický	10	0	10
2	10	MF	(Slovakia)	Andrej Fábry	7	1	8
3	18	FW	(Nigeria)	Abdulrahman Taiwo	3	2	5
3	16	FW	(Slovakia)	Marián Chobot	2	3	5
4	6	MF	(Slovakia)	Tomáš Kóňa	3	1	4
4	20	FW	(Slovakia)	Marek Fábry	1	3	4
5	14	MF	(Slovakia)	Miloš Šimončič	3	0	3
5	10	MF	(Slovakia)	Frederik Bilovský	3	0	3
5	17	DF	(Slovakia)	Jaroslav Machovec	1	2	3
6	25	MF	(Croatia)	Nikola Gatarić	1	1	2
7	2	DF	(Slovakia)	Lukáš Fabiš	1	0	1
7	22	DF	(Slovakia)	Matúš Kuník	1	0	1
7	66	MF	(Slovakia)	Márius Charizopulos	1	0	1
7	8	FW	(Serbia)	Nemanja Soković	1	0	1
7	26	DF	(Slovakia)	Pavol Farkaš	1	0	1
7	5	DF	(Slovakia)	Richard Križan	1	0	1
7	8	FW	(Ukraine)	Illya Cherednychenko	0	1	1
Own goals					3	0	0
Totals					42	14	56
