= 2020 Tipsport liga =

Tournament details
- Country: Czech Republic
- Dates: 8 January – 27 January
- Teams: 16

Final positions
- Champions: FK Mladá Boleslav
- Runner-up: Zbrojovka Brno

Tournament statistics
- Matches played: 28
- Goals scored: 93 (3.32 per match)
- Top goal scorer(s): (Czech Republic) Petr Hronek (Czech Republic) Jiří Klíma (Czech Republic) Jakub Přichystal (Czech Republic) Tomáš Wágner (North Macedonia) Milan Ristovski (Slovakia) Patrik Abrahám (3 goals)

2020 Tipsport liga is the twenty-third edition of the annual football tournament in Czech Republic.

== Groups ==
=== Group A ===
- All matches will be played in Xaverov.

Team	Pld	W	D	L	GF	GA	GD	Pts
Bohemians 1905	3	2	0	1	6	2	+4	6
FK Dukla Prague	3	1	0	2	10	4	+6	3
FK Jablonec	3	1	0	2	4	6	−2	3
1. FK Příbram	3	1	0	2	3	11	−8	3

11 January 2020	Bohemians 1905	2–1	FK Dukla Prague	Xaverov
11:30	Puškáč 6'; Hronek 87'		Jakab 85'

11 January 2020	1. FK Příbram	3–1	FK Jablonec	Xaverov
14:00	Díl 20'; Cmiljanović (yellow card) 27'; Soldát (yellow card) 52' (goal) 62'; Şehit 75'		Petrović 56'

15 January 2020	FK Jablonec	1–0	Bohemians 1905	Xaverov
14:00	Chramosta 5'

18 January 2020	Bohemians 1905	4–0	1. FK Příbram	Xaverov
11:30	Šmíd 16'; Hronek 53', 86'; Kvída 57' (o.g.); Krch (yellow card) 73'		Vokřínek (yellow card) 78'

18 January 2020	FK Dukla Prague	2–3	FK Jablonec	Xaverov
14:00	Kim Seung-bin (yellow card) 65'; Hašek 70'; Dancák 80'; Chlumecký (yellow card) 84'		Jugas (yellow card) 12'; Pilík 48'; Chramosta 58'; Piroch 67' (o.g.)

22 January 2020	FK Dukla Prague	6–0	1. FK Příbram	Xaverov
11:30	Tetour 10'; Holík 13', 15'; Ullman 19'; Kozma 55'; Fišl 74'

=== Group B ===
- All matches will be played in Mladá Boleslav.

Team	Pld	W	D	L	GF	GA	GD	Pts
FK Mladá Boleslav (H)	3	2	1	0	5	2	+3	7
AC Sparta Prague B	3	0	3	0	2	2	0	3
FK Varnsdorf	3	0	2	1	3	5	−2	2
FC Hradec Králové	3	0	2	1	1	2	−1	2

(H) Hosts

8 January 2020	AC Sparta Prague B	1–1	FK Varnsdorf	Mladá Boleslav
11:30	Vácha 15'		Rudnytskyy (yellow card) 14'; Breda 90' (pen.)

11 January 2020	FK Varnsdorf	1–1	FC Hradec Králové	Mladá Boleslav
11:30	Barac 63'		Šípek 74'

12 January 2020	FK Mladá Boleslav	1–1	AC Sparta Prague B	Mladá Boleslav
14:00	Tatayev 69' (yellow card) 70'		Patrák 27'; Chervak (yellow card) 73'; Gabriel (yellow card) 90'

15 January 2020	FC Hradec Králové	0–1	FK Mladá Boleslav	Mladá Boleslav
14:00			Hönig 29'

18 January 2020	FK Mladá Boleslav	3–1	FK Varnsdorf	Mladá Boleslav
11:30	Ji. Klíma 13'; Pech 14'; Wágner 86'		Šimon 52'

21 January 2020	AC Sparta Prague B	0–0	FC Hradec Králové	Mladá Boleslav
11:30	Traoré (yellow card) 53'; Burda (yellow card) 90+1'		Liebl (yellow card) 52'; Král (yellow card) 57'; Čech (yellow card) 85'; Kosař (yellow card) 90'

=== Group C ===
- All matches will be played in Dunajská Streda, Slovakia.

Team	Pld	W	D	L	GF	GA	GD	Pts
FC Zbrojovka Brno	3	2	0	1	9	6	+3	6
(Slovakia) FC Nitra	3	1	1	1	9	6	+3	4
(Slovakia) MFK Skalica	3	1	1	1	5	6	−1	4
(Slovakia) FC DAC 1904 Dunajská Streda (H)	3	1	0	2	2	7	−5	3

(H) Hosts

15 January 2020	FC Nitra (Slovakia)	3–3	(Slovakia) MFK Skalica	Dunajská Streda
14:00	Ristovski 9'; Farkaš 39'; Mikuš 86'		Hlavatovič 21'; ? (yellow card) 24'; Ranko 29'; Popović 75'

18 January 2020	FC DAC 1904 Dunajská Streda (Slovakia)	0–5	FC Zbrojovka Brno	Dunajská Streda
14:00			Fousek 15'; Přichystal 44', 63'; Pachlopník 64'; Bariš 88'

19 January 2020	FC Nitra (Slovakia)	5–1	FC Zbrojovka Brno	Dunajská Streda
11:30	Gatarić 5'; Martišiak 41'; Ristovski 69', 82'; Šefčík 88'		Pachlopník 76'

19 January 2020	MFK Skalica (Slovakia)	1–0	(Slovakia) FC DAC 1904 Dunajská Streda	Dunajská Streda
14:00	Hlavatovič 74'

22 January 2020	FC DAC 1904 Dunajská Streda (Slovakia)	2–1	(Slovakia) FC Nitra	Dunajská Streda
11:30	Divković 62'; Ramírez 84'		Kuliš 60'

22 January 2020	FC Zbrojovka Brno	3–1	(Slovakia) MFK Skalica	Dunajská Streda
12:00	Hladík 11', 21'; Šumbera 30'		Frimmel 20'

=== Group D ===
- All matches will be played in Ostrava.

Team	Pld	W	D	L	GF	GA	GD	Pts
FC Baník Ostrava (H)	3	1	2	0	7	4	+3	5
MFK Karviná	3	1	2	0	4	3	+1	5
(Slovakia) FK Pohronie	3	1	1	1	4	5	−1	4
1. SK Prostějov	3	0	1	2	5	8	−3	1

(H) Hosts

10 January 2020	FC Baník Ostrava	2–2	1. SK Prostějov	Ostrava
11:30	Chvěja 29'; Buchta 61'		Teplý 1'; Šteigl 53'

10 January 2020	MFK Karviná	0–0	(Slovakia) FK Pohronie	Ostrava
14:00	Jean (yellow card) 44'		Mazan (yellow card) 18'

14 January 2020	MFK Karviná	1–1	FC Baník Ostrava	Ostrava
11:30	Ba Loua 26'; Rundić (penalty missed)		Stronati 77' (pen.)

18 January 2020	1. SK Prostějov	2–3	MFK Karviná	Ostrava
11:30	Smékal 67'; Koudelka 86'		Lingr 26'; Eduardo Santos 45+1'; Petráň 56'

18 January 2020	FC Baník Ostrava	3–1	(Slovakia) FK Pohronie	Ostrava
14:00	Barkov 37'; Stronati 42' (pen.); Buchta 74'; Raab 88'		Abrahám 85'

21 January 2020	FK Pohronie (Slovakia)	3–1	1. SK Prostějov	Ostrava
12:00	Abrahám 14', 83'; Tandir 39'		Koudelka 59'

== Semifinals ==
25 January 2020	Zbrojovka Brno	3–2	FC Baník Ostrava	Ta' Qali
12:00	Šural (yellow card) 11'; Přichystal 23'; Fousek 46'; Vintr 82'		Jánoš 8', 12'

25 January 2020	FK Mladá Boleslav	5–0	(Slovakia) FC DAC 1904 Dunajská Streda	Ta' Qali
14:30	Jiří Klíma 27', 50'; Pudil 45+2' (yellow card) 59'; Pech 74'; Wágner 90' (pen.)

== Third place ==
27 January 2020	FC Baník Ostrava	1–1 (4–5 p)	(Slovakia) FC DAC 1904 Dunajská Streda	Ta' Qali
12:00	Smola 70' (yellow card) 89'		Davis 56' (yellow card) 89'
	Penalties
	Šašinka (penalty scored); Jirásek (penalty scored); Jánoš (penalty missed); Kuzmanović (penalty scored); Smola (penalty scored); Fleišman (penalty missed)		Kružliak (penalty scored); Divković (penalty scored); Fábry (penalty scored); Ramírez (penalty scored); Davis (penalty missed); Boateng (penalty scored)

== Final ==
27 January 2020	Zbrojovka Brno	1–1 (3–4 p)	FK Mladá Boleslav	Ta' Qali
14:00	Sedlák (yellow card) 54'; Fousek 61' (yellow card) 62'		Křapka (yellow card) 33'; Wágner 45+1'; Hönig (yellow card) 75'
	Penalties
	Čermák (penalty missed); Šumbera (penalty scored); Šural (penalty scored); Vintr (penalty missed); Eismann (penalty scored); Dreksa (penalty missed)		Tatayev (penalty missed); Blazko (penalty missed); Klíma (penalty scored); Rudzan (penalty scored); Budínský (penalty scored); Douděra (penalty scored)

== Goalscorers ==
3 goals

- (Czech Republic) Petr Hronek
- (Czech Republic) Jiří Klíma
- (Czech Republic) Jakub Přichystal
- (Czech Republic) Tomáš Wágner
- (North Macedonia) Milan Ristovski
- (Slovakia) Patrik Abrahám

2 goals

- (Czech Republic) David Buchta
- (Czech Republic) Jan Chramosta
- (Czech Republic) Adam Fousek
- (Czech Republic) Jan Hladík
- (Czech Republic) Lukáš Holík
- (Czech Republic) Adam Jánoš
- (Czech Republic) Jan Koudelka
- (Czech Republic) Ondřej Pachlopník
- (Czech Republic) David Pech
- (Czech Republic) Patrizio Stronati
- (Slovakia) Lukáš Hlavatovič

1 goal

- (Bosnia and Herzegovina) Ismar Tandir
- (Brazil) Eduardo Santos
- (Croatia) Marko Divković
- (Croatia) Nikola Gatarić
- (Czech Republic) Jakub Barac
- (Czech Republic) Timofej Barkov
- (Czech Republic) David Breda
- (Czech Republic) Ondřej Chvěja
- (Czech Republic) Samuel Dancák
- (Czech Republic) Jan Díl
- (Czech Republic) Daniel Fišl
- (Czech Republic) Filip Hašek
- (Czech Republic) Michael Hönig
- (Czech Republic) Josef Jakab
- (Czech Republic) Daniel Kozma
- (Czech Republic) Ondřej Lingr
- (Czech Republic) Vojtěch Patrák
- (Czech Republic) Michal Petráň
- (Czech Republic) Tomáš Pilík
- (Czech Republic) Daniel Pudil
- (Czech Republic) David Puškáč
- (Czech Republic) Lukáš Raab
- (Czech Republic) Matěj Šimon
- (Czech Republic) Jakub Šípek
- (Czech Republic) Radek Smékal
- (Czech Republic) Michal Šmíd
- (Czech Republic) Tomáš Smola
- (Czech Republic) Karel Soldát
- (Czech Republic) Jan Šteigl
- (Czech Republic) Šimon Šumbera
- (Czech Republic) Jakub Teplý
- (Czech Republic) Daniel Tetour
- (Czech Republic) Ondřej Ullman
- (Czech Republic) Lukáš Vácha
- (Czech Republic) Marek Vintr
- (Ivory Coast) Adriel Ba Loua
- (Montenegro) Zoran Petrović
- (Panama) Erick Davis
- (Russia) Aleksei Tatayev
- (Serbia) Mihajilo Popović
- (Slovakia) Damián Bariš
- (Slovakia) Pavol Farkaš
- (Slovakia) Marek Frimmel
- (Slovakia) Kuliš
- (Slovakia) Dominik Martišiak
- (Slovakia) Matúš Mikuš
- (Slovakia) Michal Ranko
- (Slovakia) Samuel Šefčík
- (Turkey) Erdi Şehit
- (Venezuela) Eric Ramírez

1 own goal

- (Czech Republic) Jan Kvída
- (Czech Republic) Jiří Piroch
