= Didiba =

Didiba may refer to:

- Didiba, Democratic Republic of the Congo

== People with the surname ==
- Joss Didiba, Cameroonian professional footballer
