= Machovec =

Machovec (feminine: Machovcová) is a Czech and Slovak surname. Notable people with the surname include:

- Jaroslav Machovec (born 1986), Slovak footballer
- Milan Machovec (1925–2003), Czech philosopher
