= Gulas (surname) =

Gulas is a surname. Notable bearers include:

- George Gulas, American professional wrestler
- Laurie Gulas (born 1969), Canadian jockey
- Nick Gulas (1914–1991), American wrestling promoter

== See also ==
- Dominik Guláš (born 1999), Slovak footballer
- Milan Gulaš (born 1985), Czech ice hockey player
