= Midat Galbayev =

Kazakh footballer

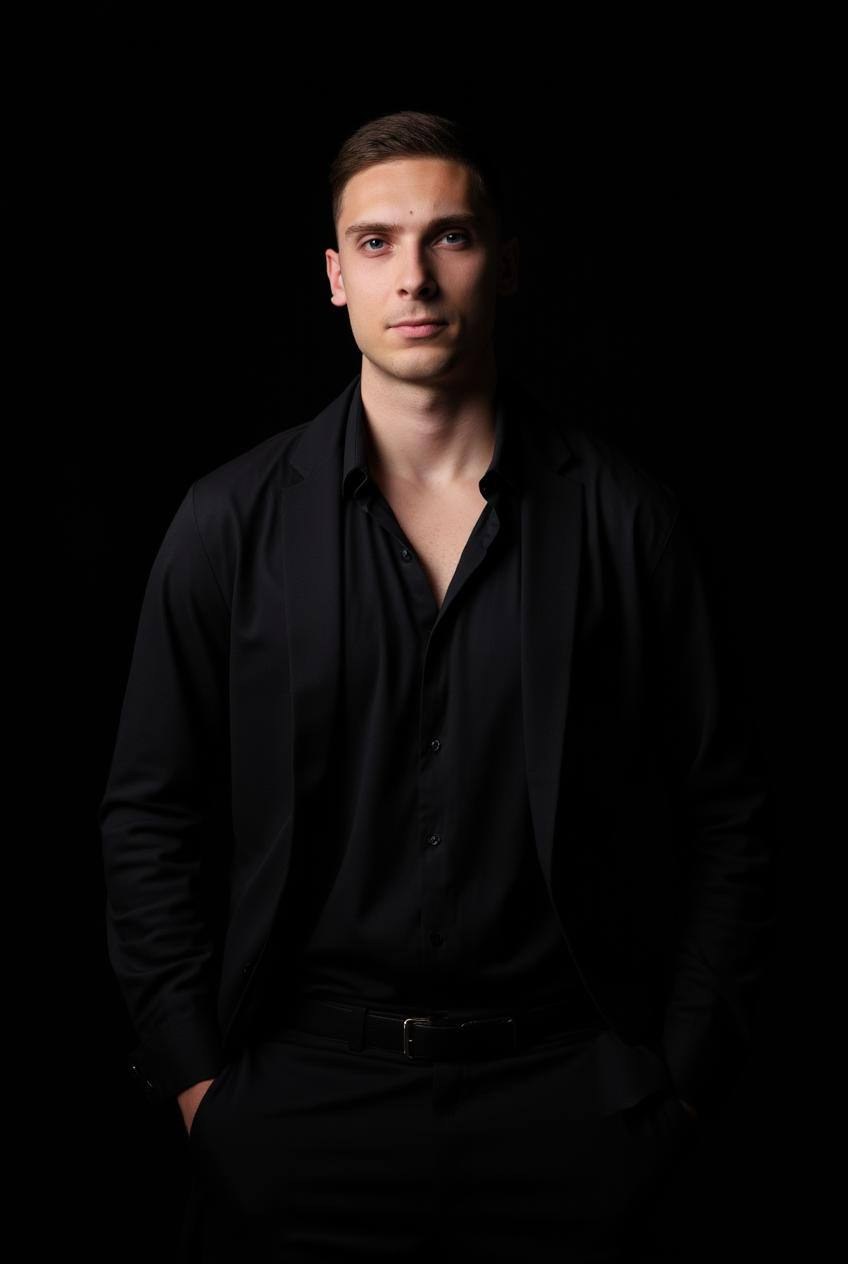

Personal information
- Date of birth: 14 March 1997 (age 29)
- Place of birth: Almaty, Kazakhstan
- Position: Defender

Youth career
- –2015: Beroe Stara Zagora
- 2016–2017: Levski Sofia

Senior career*
Years	Team	Apps	(Gls)
2017	Zimbru Chișinău	0	(0)
2018	Irtysh Pavlodar	0	(0)
2018	Kyzylzhar	0	(0)
2019	Vereya Stara Zagora	4	(0)
2019−2020	Nitra	1	(0)

International career
2019	Kazakhstan U21	0	(0)
- * Club domestic league appearances and goals

Midat Galbayev (born 14 March 1997) is a Kazakh former professional footballer who played as a defender.

== Club career ==
Galbayev made his professional Fortuna Liga debut for Nitra against Spartak Trnava on 4 August 2019. Galbayev, however, had to be replaced by Ondrej Vrábel after less than half an hour, due to an injury.
