= 2019 Tipsport liga =

Tournament details
- Country: Czech Republic
- Dates: 5 January – 27 January
- Teams: 16

Final positions
- Champions: Zbrojovka Brno
- Runner-up: (Slovakia) Slovan Bratislava

Tournament statistics
- Matches played: 28
- Goals scored: 98 (3.5 per match)
- Top goal scorer(s): Jakub Teplý (1. SC Znojmo) (4 goals)

2019 Tipsport liga is the twenty-second edition of the annual football tournament in Czech Republic.

== Groups ==
=== Group A ===
- All matches will be played in Xaverov.

Team	Pld	W	D	L	GF	GA	GD	Pts
1. FK Příbram	3	2	0	1	8	5	+3	6
FC Sellier & Bellot Vlašim	3	2	0	1	6	4	+2	6
FC Hradec Králové	3	2	0	1	5	3	+2	6
FK Ústí nad Labem	3	0	0	3	3	10	−7	0

=== Group B ===
- All matches will be played in Xaverov.

Team	Pld	W	D	L	GF	GA	GD	Pts
FK Jablonec	3	2	1	0	4	1	+3	7
MFK Chrudim	3	1	1	1	5	6	−1	4
FK Varnsdorf	3	1	0	2	5	4	+1	3
FK Pardubice	3	0	2	1	3	6	−3	2

=== Group C ===
- All matches will be played in Brno.

Team	Pld	W	D	L	GF	GA	GD	Pts
FC MAS Táborsko	3	2	0	1	8	3	+5	6
FC Zbrojovka Brno	3	2	0	1	9	7	+2	6
(Slovakia) FC Nitra	3	1	1	1	6	7	−1	4
1. SC Znojmo	3	0	1	2	7	13	−6	1

=== Group D ===
- All matches will be played in Orlová and Vranov nad Topľou.

Team	Pld	W	D	L	GF	GA	GD	Pts
FC Baník Ostrava	3	3	0	0	7	3	+4	9
(Slovakia) 1. FC Tatran Prešov	3	1	0	2	5	4	+1	3
1. SK Prostějov	3	1	0	2	2	4	−2	3
(Slovakia) FK Poprad	3	1	0	2	3	6	−3	3

== Semifinals ==
19 January 2019
12:00

FC MAS Táborsko	0–2	Zbrojovka Brno
		Lukáš Vraštil 10'; Michal Škoda 89'

Malta
19 January 2019
14:30

Mladá Boleslav	1–2	(Slovakia) Slovan Bratislava
Jakub Fulnek 67'		Andraž Šporar 20'; Aleksandar Čavrić 28'

Malta

== Third place ==
21 January 2019
12:00

FC MAS Táborsko	1–3	Mladá Boleslav
Jakub Kopřiva 32'		Tomáš Přikryl 6', 41'; Dominik Hašek 51'

Malta

== Final ==
21 January 2019
14:30

Zbrojovka Brno	3–0	(Slovakia) Slovan Bratislava
Šimon Šumbera 33'; Damián Bariš 42'; Petr Pavlík 44'

Malta
