= Erik Nielson (footballer) =

Cape Verdean footballer

Personal information
- Full name: Erik Nielson Duarte Bonaventura
- Date of birth: 31 October 1996 (age 30)
- Place of birth: Cape Verde
- Height: 1.83 m (6 ft 0 in)
- Position: Defender

Senior career*
Years	Team	Apps	(Gls)
2020	AS Trenčín	1	(0)
- * Club domestic league appearances and goals as of 12 January 2021

Erik Nielson Duarte Bonaventura (born 31 October 1996), commonly known as Erik Nielson, is a professional Cape Verdean footballer who last played for Fortuna Liga club AS Trenčín as a midfielder.

== Club career ==
=== AS Trenčín ===
Nielson made his Fortuna Liga debut for AS Trenčín against Nitra on 11 July 2020. He was fielded in the starting line-up and was booked with a yellow card.
