= Daniel Jesus =

Brazilian footballer (born 1998)

Personal information
- Full name: Daniel Junio de Jesus Nascimento
- Date of birth: 22 May 1998 (age 28)
- Place of birth: Ribeirão Preto, Brazil
- Height: 1.86 m (6 ft 1 in)
- Position: Defensive midfielder

Team information
- Current team: VPK-Ahro Shevchenkivka
- Number: 6

Youth career
- 2016–2018: Novorizontino

Senior career*
Years	Team	Apps	(Gls)
2018–2021	Novorizontino	0	(0)
2019	→ Catanduva (loan)	19	(1)
2020	→ Nitra (loan)	10	(0)
2021–	VPK-Ahro Shevchenkivka	18	(1)
- * Club domestic league appearances and goals as of 31 December 2021

Daniel Junio de Jesus Nascimento (born 22 May 1998), known as Daniel Jesus, is a Brazilian professional footballer who plays as a defensive midfielder for Ukrainian club VPK-Ahro Shevchenkivka.
