= Marek Fábry =

Slovak football forward

Personal information
- Date of birth: 7 August 1998 (age 28)
- Place of birth: Nitra, Slovakia
- Height: 1.91 m (6 ft 3 in)
- Position: Forward

Team information
- Current team: Dynamo Malženice
- Number: 99

Youth career
- 2006–2018: Nitra

Senior career*
Years	Team	Apps	(Gls)
2016–2019	Nitra	33	(1)
2020–2022	Dukla Prague	51	(10)
2022	GKS Jastrzębie	13	(5)
2022–2024	Zagłębie Sosnowiec	50	(8)
2024–2026	Skalica	37	(2)
2026–	Dynamo Malženice	13	(4)

International career
2016–2017	Slovakia U19	2	(0)
2018	Slovakia U20	2	(0)
2019–2020	Slovakia U21	3	(0)
- * Club domestic league appearances and goals as of 25 May 2026

Marek Fábry (born 7 August 1998) is a Slovak professional footballer who plays as a forward for OFK Dynamo Malženice.

A product of the FC Nitra academy, Fábry later played for Dukla Prague, GKS Jastrzebie and Zaglebie Sosnowiec. He would later spend one and a half seasons in MFK Skalica before moving to second division club Dynamo Malženice.

== Club career ==
=== FC Nitra ===
He made his Fortuna Liga debut for Nitra on 10 March 2018, in a game against Senica. Fábry replaced Márius Charizopulos five minutes before stoppage time. Nitra won the game 1–0.

Despite mostly playing as a forward, Fábry had only scored one league goal for Trogári. This was on 26 April 2019, during a 2–2 tie against Železiarne Podbrezová, when he utilised a ball from youth-level international Tomáš Vestenický in the 43rd minute, to equalise the score of the game and save one point for Nitra. In the second half, Fábry was replaced by Nemanja Soković. Fábry also scored a total of six goals in six Slovnaft Cup appearances, spanning two seasons, against lower division clubs.

=== Dukla Prague ===
On 18 January 2020, it was announced that had signed with Dukla Prague, which, at the time of his arrival, was ranked fourth of sixteen and was battling for promotion in the Czech Second League. Fábry signed a three-and-a-half-year contract. He had stated that manager Roman Skuhravý had a positive influence on his decision to sign with the club.

=== GKS Jastrzębie ===
On 20 January 2022, Fábry moved to Poland to join GKS Jastrzębie, signing for the rest of the season with an option to extend for the 2022–23 season.

=== Zagłębie Sosnowiec ===
Following GKS Jastrzębie's relegation he remained in I liga, after signing a two-year deal with Zagłębie Sosnowiec on 18 June 2022. Shortly before its expiration, on 10 June 2024, Fábry terminated his contract with the club by mutual consent.

=== Skalica ===
On 18 June 2024, Fábry returned to Slovakia to join top-flight club MFK Skalica. He debuted for the club in the Slovak First Football League in a 0–0 draw against Zemplin Michalovce, playing 73 minutes. Fábry scored the winning goal in a 4–2 league win against Zemplin Michalovce, scoring in the 67th minute to secure the win for his club.

=== Dynamo Malženice ===
At the end of autumn 2025, Skalica informed Fábry that he would not the in the club’s plans for the rest of the season, so he was allowed to look for a new club. He received an offer from Poland, which he rejected. On 20 January 2026, it was announced that Fábry would be joining 2. Liga club, OFK Dynamo Malženice, signing a contract until the end of the year. He scored on his debut for Malženice in a 4–1 winter preparation defeat to SK Hanácká Slavia Kroměříž.
