= Daniel Fišl =

Czech footballer (born 2000)

Personal information
- Date of birth: 17 June 2000 (age 26)
- Place of birth: Czech Republic
- Position: Defender

Team information
- Current team: Erzgebirge Aue
- Number: 4

Youth career
- Sparta Prague

Senior career*
Years	Team	Apps	(Gls)
2018	Sparta Prague	0	(0)
2018	→ Olympia Prague (loan)	12	(1)
2018–2019	České Budějovice	3	(0)
2019–2021	Dukla Prague	4	(0)
2021–2022	MFK Chrudim	10	(0)
2022	→ 1. FK Příbram (loan)	12	(0)
2022–2024	Viagem Příbram	59	(3)
2024–2026	Viktoria Žižkov	39	(3)
2026–	Erzgebirge Aue	3	(0)

International career
2016–2017	Czech Republic U17	12	(0)
- * Club domestic league appearances and goals as of 23 September 2026

Daniel Fišl (born 17 June 2000) is a Czech professional footballer who plays for German Regionalliga Nordost club Erzgebirge Aue.

== Club career ==
He made his Czech National Football League debut for Olympia Radotín on 4 March 2018 in a game against FK Viktoria Žižkov.
