= Joss Didiba =

Cameroonian professional footballer

Personal information
- Full name: Joss Moudoumbou Didiba
- Date of birth: 7 November 1997 (age 29)
- Place of birth: Douala, Cameroon
- Height: 1.85 m (6 ft 1 in)
- Position: Midfielder

Team information
- Current team: FC Zlín
- Number: 6

Youth career
- Perugia
- 2016: → Juventus Primavera (loan)

Senior career*
Years	Team	Apps	(Gls)
2015–2017	Perugia	6	(0)
2016	→ Matera (loan)	2	(0)
2018	Ebolitana	?	(?)
2018–2019	ASD Troina	29	(4)
2019–2021	Senica	29	(2)
2020–2021	→ Opava (loan)	27	(0)
2021–2022	Opava	6	(1)
2022–	Zlín	116	(3)

International career
2016–2017	Cameroon U20		
- * Club domestic league appearances and goals as of 27 May 2026

Joss Moudoumbou Didiba (born 7 November 1997) is a Cameroonian professional footballer who plays for FC Zlín.

== Club career ==
=== Italian tenure ===
Didiba made his debut on 8 December 2015 against Novara in Serie B. He joined Juventus on loan in January 2016.

=== FK Senica ===
Didiba joined Senica in the summer of 2019. From early on, he became a starting line-up regular.

Didiba made his Fortuna Liga debut in the premier round of the season, on 20 July 2019, in a home fixture against AS Trenčín. Didiba came on as a late second-half replacement for Lovro Cvek, as Senica was in a 2:1 lead. While Trenčín had taken the lead through former Slovak international David Depetris, Senica came back by two goals from Eneji Moses. While Didiba was on the pitch, during stoppage time, Frank Castañeda had managed to convert a penalty to finalise the score at 3:1.

On 23 August 2019, during a home fixture against ViOn Zlaté Moravce, Didiba had scored his first goal for Senica. From the 17th minute, Senica had trailed after a goal by Tomáš Ďubek, but Didiba had equaled the score some 10 minutes later. Ďubek had scored again in the second half and was soon followed by Senad Jarović, bringing the match total to 1:3. Didiba had scored once more in October, during a 1:4 victory over Nitra at pod Zoborom.

During early spring part of the 2019–20 season, Didiba enjoyed a brief spell as a captain of Senica, following a mass exodus of foreign first-team players, due to financial troubles of the club.
