= Vydrany =

Vydrany Nemeshódos
- Municipality
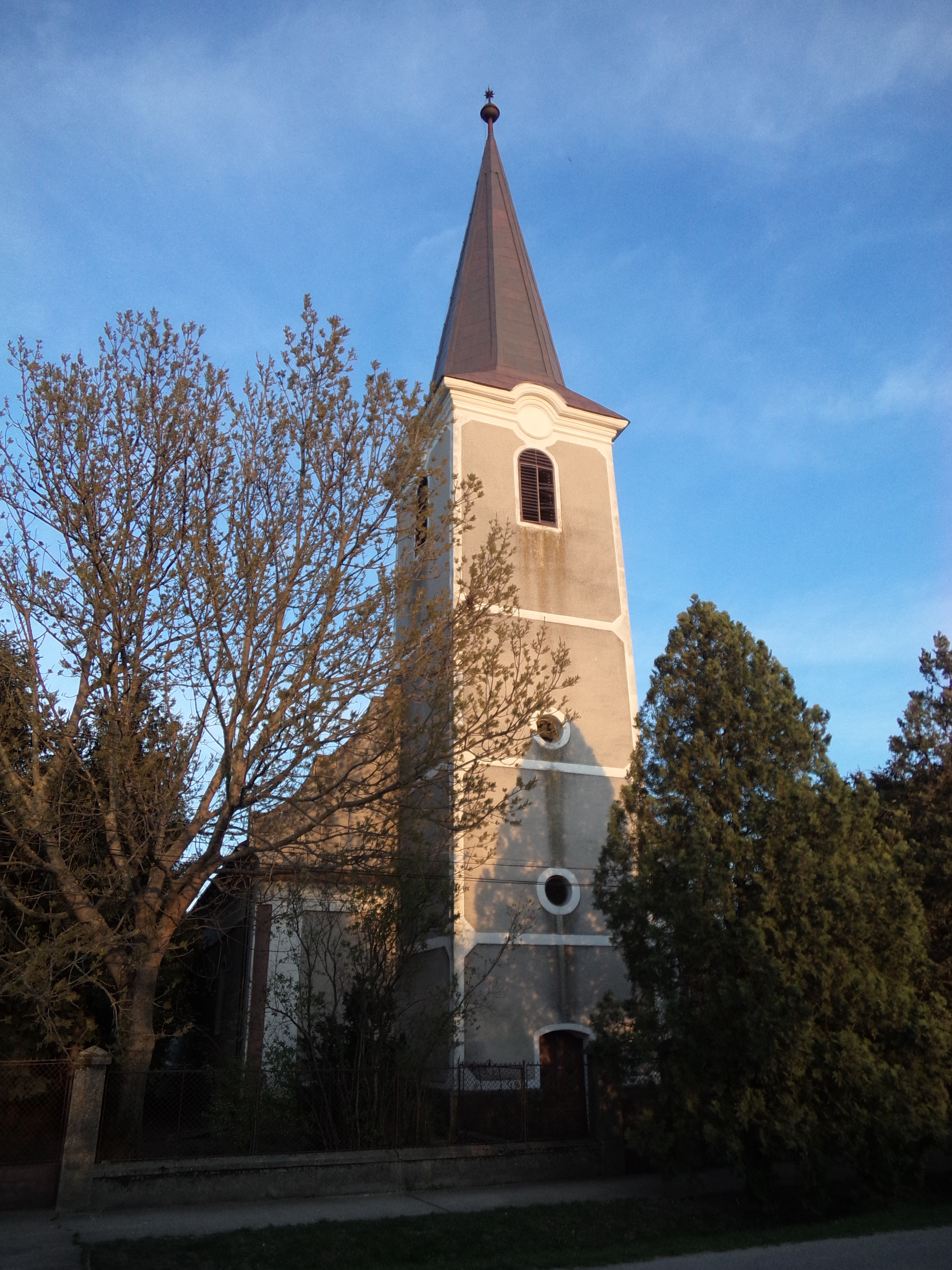

- Flag

- Location of Vydrany in the Trnava Region Location of Vydrany in Slovakia
- Coordinates: 48.02°N 17.59°E
- Country: Slovakia
- Region: Trnava Region
- District: Dunajská Streda District
- First mentioned: 1245

Government
  - Mayor: László Balódi (Ind.)

Area
  - Total: 16.04 km^{2} (6.19 sq mi)
- Elevation: 116 m (381 ft)

Population (2025)
  - Total: 1,976

Ethnicity
  - Hungarians: 85,40 %
  - Slovaks: 12,23%
- Time zone: UTC+1 (CET)
  - Summer (DST): UTC+2 (CEST)
- Postal code: 930 16
- Area code: +421 31
- Vehicle registration plate (until 2022): DS
- Website: www.vydrany.sk

Vydrany (Hungarian: Nemeshódos, pronounced [nɛmɛʃhoːdoʃ], until 1899 Hódos) is a village and municipality in the Dunajská Streda District in the Trnava Region of south-west Slovakia.

== Names and etymology ==
The Hungarian name Hodos (the current name in the language of the national minority) and the former Slovak name Hodoš derive from Hungarian appellative hód - a beaver. After the abolition of serfdom and some noble privileges in 1848, the village was renamed to Nemeshodos (nemes - noble). In 1948, the village was renamed to Vydrany. This name comes from a translation mistake. In Slovak vydra means an otter.

== History ==
In the 9th century, the territory of Vydrany became part of the Kingdom of Hungary. The village was first recorded in 1245 by its Hungarian name as Hodus. At the end of the 13th century, it was the estate of the Hodossy family, later it became a village of noble families. In the 19th century, the village was the estate of the local Vermes family.

Until the end of World War I, the village was part of Hungary and fell within the Dunaszerdahely district of Pozsony County. After the Austro-Hungarian army disintegrated in November 1918, Czechoslovak troops occupied the area. After the Treaty of Trianon of 1920, the village became officially part of Czechoslovakia. In November 1938, the First Vienna Award granted the area to Hungary and it was held by Hungary until 1945. After Soviet occupation in 1945, Czechoslovak administration returned and the village became officially part of Czechoslovakia in 1947.

== Geography ==
The municipality lies at an altitude of 116 metres (381 ft) and covers an area of 16.04 km^{2} (6.19 sq mi) (2025).

== Population ==
Population statistic (10 years)
Year	1995	2005	2015	2025
Count	1326	1434	1668	1976
Difference		+8.14%	+16.31%	+18.46%

Population statistic
Year	2024	2025
Count	1904	1976
Difference		+3.78%

It has a population of 1976 people (31 December 2025).

=== Ethnicity ===
Census 2021 (1+ %)
Ethnicity	Number	Fraction
Hungarian	1435	80.48%
Slovak	345	19.34%
Not found out	107	6%
Romani	31	1.73%
Total	1783	

In year 2021 was 1783 people by ethnicity 1435 as Hungarian, 345 as Slovak, 107 as Not found out, 31 as Romani, 6 as Czech, 3 as Other, 2 as Polish, 2 as German, 2 as Albanian, 1 as Silesian, 1 as Rusyn and 1 as Russian.

Note on population: The difference values of population numbers in the table "Population statistic" and in the sections "Ethnicity" & "Religion" is caused by the use of various statistical methods.

=== Religion ===
Census 2021 (1+ %)
Religion	Number	Fraction
Roman Catholic Church	905	50.76%
None	403	22.6%
Calvinist Church	305	17.11%
Not found out	90	5.05%
Evangelical Church	32	1.79%
Greek Catholic Church	18	1.01%
Total	1783	

In year 2021 was 1783 people by religion 905 from Roman Catholic Church, 403 from None, 305 from Calvinist Church, 90 from Not found out, 32 from Evangelical Church, 18 from Greek Catholic Church, 8 from Christian Congregations in Slovakia, 4 from Other and not ascertained christian church, 3 from Islam, 3 from Other, 3 from United Methodist Church, 2 from Eastern Orthodox Church, 2 from Buddhism, 2 from Baptists Church, 1 from Jehovah's Witnesses, 1 from Church of Jesus Christ of Latter-day Saints and 1 from Apostolic Church.

In 1910, the village had 997, for the most part, Hungarian inhabitants. At the 2001 Census the recorded population of the village was 1390 while an end-2008 estimate by the Statistical Office had the village's population also as 1499. As of 2001, 85.40% of its population was Hungarian while 12.23% was Slovak.

Roman Catholicism is the majority religion of the village, its adherents numbering 56.04% of the total population.
