= Jakub Barac =

Czech footballer

Personal information
- Date of birth: 4 August 1996 (age 30)
- Place of birth: Czech Republic
- Height: 1.76 m (5 ft 9 in)
- Position: Midfielder

Team information
- Current team: Silon Táborsko
- Number: 6

Senior career*
Years	Team	Apps	(Gls)
2017–2021	Varnsdorf	73	(5)
2020	→ Slovan Liberec (loan)	3	(0)
2021–2024	Dukla Prague	95	(3)
2024–	Silon Táborsko	43	(4)
- * Club domestic league appearances and goals as of 24 May 2026

Jakub Barac (born 4 August 1996) is a Czech professional footballer who plays for Silon Táborsko. He played in the Czech First League and the UEFA Europa League for FC Slovan Liberec.

Barac joined Liberec on loan from Varnsdorf in the summer of 2020, and played in the UEFA Europa League, coming on as a substitute in a 5–1 loss against Red Star Belgrade in the group stage.

He made a permanent transfer to Dukla Prague in January 2021, signing a contract until June 2023.

On 5 September 2024, Barac signed a contract with Silon Táborsko.
