= Dolné Obdokovce =

Village and municipality in Slovakia

Dolné Obdokovce Alsóbodok
- Municipality
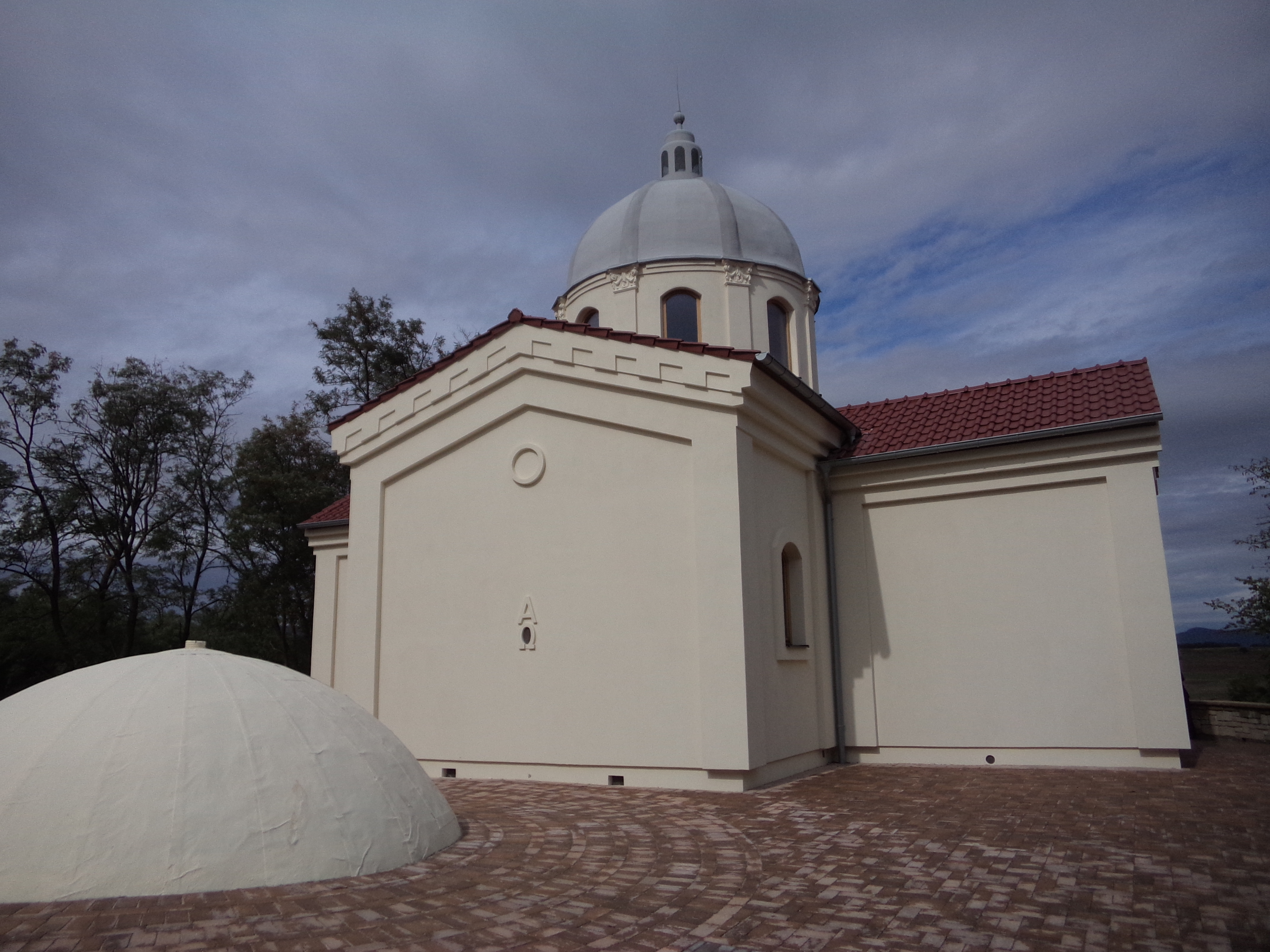
- Chapel of the Exaltation of the Holy Cross

- Flag

- Location of Dolné Obdokovce in the Nitra Region Location of Dolné Obdokovce in Slovakia
- Coordinates: 48.32°N 18.22°E
- Country: Slovakia
- Region: Nitra Region
- District: Nitra District
- First mentioned: 1228

Area
  - Total: 10.18 km^{2} (3.93 sq mi)
- Elevation: 190 m (620 ft)

Population (2025)
  - Total: 1,137
- Time zone: UTC+1 (CET)
  - Summer (DST): UTC+2 (CEST)
- Postal code: 951 02
- Area code: +421 37
- Vehicle registration plate (until 2022): NR
- Website: www.dolneobdokovce.sk

Dolné Obdokovce (Hungarian: Alsóbodok) is a village and municipality in the Nitra District in western central Slovakia, in the Nitra Region.

== History ==
In historical records the village was first mentioned in 1228.

== Geography ==
The municipality lies at an altitude of 190 metres (620 ft) and covers an area of 10.18 km^{2} (3.93 sq mi) (2025).

== Population ==
Population statistic (10 years)
Year	1995	2005	2015	2025
Count	1136	1150	1171	1137
Difference		+1.23%	+1.82%	−2.90%

Population statistic
Year	2024	2025
Count	1130	1137
Difference		+0.61%

It has a population of 1137 people (31 December 2025).

=== Ethnicity ===
Census 2021 (1+ %)
Ethnicity	Number	Fraction
Slovak	618	54.21%
Hungarian	571	50.08%
Not found out	51	4.47%
Total	1140	

In year 2021 was 1140 people by ethnicity 618 as Slovak, 571 as Hungarian, 51 as Not found out, 2 as Czech and 2 as German.

Note on population: The difference values of population numbers in the table "Population statistic" and in the sections "Ethnicity" & "Religion" is caused by the use of various statistical methods.

=== Religion ===
Census 2021 (1+ %)
Religion	Number	Fraction
Roman Catholic Church	946	82.98%
None	120	10.53%
Not found out	47	4.12%
Total	1140	

In year 2021 was 1140 people by religion 946 from Roman Catholic Church, 120 from None, 47 from Not found out, 7 from Apostolic Church, 6 from Greek Catholic Church, 4 from Other, 3 from Evangelical Church, 2 from Calvinist Church, 2 from Ad hoc movements, 1 from Eastern Orthodox Church, 1 from Other and not ascertained christian church and 1 from Christian Congregations in Slovakia.

== Facilities ==
The village has a public library and football pitch.

== Genealogical resources ==
The records for genealogical research are available at the state archive "Statny Archiv in Nitra, Slovakia"

- Roman Catholic church records (births/marriages/deaths): 1751-1911 (parish B)

== See also ==
- List of municipalities and towns in Slovakia
