= Didiba, Democratic Republic of the Congo =

Didiba
- Village
- Map showing location of Didiba
- Coordinates: 7°11′33″S 26°43′50″E
- Country: Democratic Republic of the Congo
- Province: Haut-Katanga

Area
  - Land: 0.13 km^{2} (0.050 sq mi)
- Elevation: 794 m (2,605 ft)

Didiba is a village in Tanganyika Province, Democratic Republic of the Congo.
