= David Helísek =

Czech footballer

Personal information
- Full name: David Helísek
- Date of birth: September 4, 1982 (age 44)
- Place of birth: Czechoslovakia
- Height: 1.71 m (5 ft 7 1/2 in)
- Position: Midfielder

Team information
- Current team: Hodonín

Youth career
- FC Sokol Radějov
- TJ JISKRA Strážnice
- Baník Ostrav

Senior career*
| Years | Team | Apps | (Gls) |
| –2004 | FK Bystřice pod Hostýnem | | |
| 2004–2006 | Kunovice | 50 | (1) |
| 2006–2007 | Lamia | 1 | (0) |
| 2007–2009 | Mutěnice | | |
| 2009–2011 | DAC Dunajská Streda | 81 | (2) |
| 2012 | Vysočina Jihlava | 10 | (0) |
| 2012–2019 | Znojmo | 188 | (10) |
| 2019– | Hodonín | | |
- * Club domestic league appearances and goals as of 14:27, 2 December 2019 (UTC)

David Helísek (born 4 September 1982) is a Czech football midfielder who currently plays for Hodonín.

== Career ==
In July 2019, after seven seasons with Znojmo, Helísek joined Hodonín.
