= David Holman =

American television producer (born 1937)

- Born: May 22, 1937; Mercedes, Texas
- Education: Pan American College, Edinburg, Texas; University of Texas, Austin
- Alma mater: University of Texas at Austin (1962–1964)
- Occupations: Freelance screenwriter & essays
- Years active: 1962–2000
- Known for: Television producer and executive
- Awards: TV EMMY AWARD; Outstanding Young Man of America, 1970; Award of Merit, Director of "Paths of Progress" TV series, KTBC-TV, Austin, Texas

David Holman is a former television producer and executive who worked in New York and Los Angeles. In his six years working for Jim Henson and the Muppets, he helped launch the original The Muppet Show in 1975, and worked on Sesame Street, Emmet Otter's Jug-Band Christmas Special, and The Muppet Movie. He later produced and managed dozens of productions, including several thousand individual shows from daytime soap operas to primetime shows such as Mad About You, and late night shows such as The Dick Cavett Show. He won an Emmy Award for his work at ABC Sports on the 1984 Los Angeles Summer Olympic Games. He currently develops screenplays.

== History ==
Holman began his career in 1962 at KTBC-TV, Austin, Texas, while attending the University of Texas, Austin, where he was studying radio & TV broadcasting. Working first as a floor-crew member at KTBC-TV, he worked his way up to being an award-winning TV director. In 1964, while still at KTBC-TV, he produced, directed, choreographed and danced in a music video before music videos had even been known or become popular. That short black and white 16mm film got Holman his first job in New York City that same year as an associate producer of national TV and radio commercials with Norman, Craig & Kummel Advertising, one of the largest advertising agencies in the world. Within three months, Holman was made a producer and produced over 100 TV and radio commercials, a few of which became "classic", including Ajax laundry detergent's "White Knight" and Hertz Rent-A-Car's "The Flying Man". After three years, ABC Sports hired Holman to be a unit manager for Wide World of Sports, covering sporting events in the U.S. and England including NBA basketball, NCAA football, track and field, swimming and diving, and PGA golf tournaments, including the British Open in Blackpool, England. After three years, Holman was promoted by ABC to be the first production administrator assigned to multiple TV series and specials including The Dick Cavett Show, the Tony Awards, the Grammy Awards, and the Emmy Awards. While in this ABC position, in 1973 Holman met Jim Henson. ABC was producing a Muppet TV Special called A Muppet Valentine Special with actress Mia Farrow as the only human guest star. (Miss Piggy had not been "born" yet, nor was Kermit the Frog the host.) When ABC ordered a second TV special, The Muppet Show: Sex and Violence for a possible Muppet TV series in prime time, Henson hired Holman away from ABC to be his associate producer for that second pilot. After the two specials aired, it surprised Henson and Holman to learn that the network had passed on hiring the Muppets to be in prime time. The two other networks at the time – NBC and CBS – also passed. The Muppet Show was picked up as a syndicated TV series by several affiliates instead, and later became a hit in syndication. "By the second season, the series was breaking syndication records and broadcasting in more than 100 countries. And it won several EMMY Awards." Holman worked as the production manager overseeing Sesame Street, The Muppet Show, and the first year of NBC's Saturday Night Live. During these six years (1974–1979), Holman also produced three seasons of "Big Bird's Live Symphony Concerts". Also while at the Muppets, Holman conceived the Parker Bros. "The Muppet Show Board Game" for Henson, and assisted in the production of the "Mirinda Craver" ads.

Holman continued his career in Los Angeles first as Merv Griffin's Unit Manager for the Vine Street Theater. In 1971 Paramount produced the first season of Entertainment Tonight on the same stage as The Merv Griffin Show. ABC Sports was preparing for the 1984 Los Angeles Summer Olympic Games and hired Holman to be a Production Administrator in 1982, and then promoted him a year later as the Head of Logistics for the International Broadcast Center (IBC) on the Sunset-Gower Studio lot. Holman won a TV Emmy Award for his work on that world TV event. After Holman wrapped this two-year freelance position he was named director of live and tape production for Columbia Pictures Television. Within a few years Holman was named VP of Production for all of Columbia's TV productions at the Sunset Gower Studios and later after Sony purchased Columbia, most of the TV productions were produced at Sony Pictures (formerly MGM) and the Culver Studios, both in Culver City, California. During this time, Holman worked on several thousand episodes of television series and pilots, including The Young and the Restless, Days of Our Lives, Punky Brewster, Designing Women, What's Happening Now, Who's the Boss?, 227, My Two Dads, Entertainment Tonight, The Nanny, Mad About You, King of Queens, Married With Children, Jeopardy, and Wheel of Fortune. After his retirement in 2000, Holman wrote his first essay about his experiences with Jim Henson and The Muppets, which was published in the December 2004 issue of Palm Springs Life.

During his semi-retirement, Holman met author Joyce Spizer, and together they co-wrote (with another first-time writer) their first screenplay. Holman and Spizer (now Joyce Foy) have written a second screenplay and formed Hollywood East Productions in 2005 to write and produce independent films. Holman also co-wrote a TV special about the career of country legend Patsy Cline with singer Cali McCord in Las Cruces, New Mexico. Holman currently lives with his life partner Tom Young in Surprise, Arizona, and Holman continues to do creative writing and has been speaking to numerous film and TV students in Texas, California, Illinois, and New Mexico.

Holman was named an Outstanding Young Man of America in 1970 by the U.S. Jaycees, and given an Award of Merit by the Texas Society of Professional Engineers, for directing the Paths of Progress TV series at KTBC-TV, Austin, Texas, in 1963. He served in the U.S. Army in Munich, Germany, between 1960 and 1962, and was honorably discharged in 1962.

Holman remains an active member of the Producers Guild of America, the Academy of TV Arts and Sciences, a founding member of the Palm Springs Chapter of Women In Film, a guest lecturer for colleges and universities in the U.S., and is a life member of the University of Texas Ex-Students' Association. Holman is listed in Who's Who in Entertainment 1990–Present and in Who's Who in California 1983–2006.
