= Eneji Moses =

Nigerian footballer

Personal information
- Full name: Peter Eneji Moses
- Date of birth: 8 April 1999 (age 27)
- Place of birth: Jos, Nigeria
- Height: 1.69 m (5 ft 7 in)
- Position: Striker

Senior career*
Years	Team	Apps	(Gls)
2017–2019	Plateau United		
2019	Akwa United		
2019–2020	Senica	22	(5)
2021	Sereď	7	(1)

International career^{‡}
- Nigeria U20
2018	Nigeria	1	(0)
- * Club domestic league appearances and goals as of 09:11, 20 August 2021 (UTC) ‡ National team caps and goals as of 19:12, 16 May 2020 (UTC)

Peter Eneji Moses (born 8 April 1999) is a Nigerian international footballer who last played for Sereď in the Slovak Fortuna Liga, as a striker.

== Club career ==
Born in Jos, he spent his early career with Plateau United and Akwa United.

He signed for Senica in July 2019. He scored on his debut for the club later that month, coming off the substitutes' bench to score 2 goals.

In February 2021 he signed for Sereď, and made his debut for the club on 20 February 2021 in a 2:0 win over Zemplín Michalovce.

== International career ==
Moses made his international debut for Nigeria in 2018, having also played for the Nigerian under-20 team.
