= Illya Cherednychenko =

Ukrainian footballer

Personal information
- Full name: Illya Leonidovych Cherednychenko
- Date of birth: 12 June 1995 (age 31)
- Place of birth: Kyiv, Ukraine
- Height: 1.76 m (5 ft 9 in)
- Position: Winger

Youth career
- Dynamo Kyiv
- 2012–2014: Metalist Kharkiv

Senior career*
Years	Team	Apps	(Gls)
2014–2015	Metalist Kharkiv	0	(0)
2015–2016	Nové Zámky	6	(1)
2016	→ Slovan Duslo Šaľa (loan)	10	(2)
2016	Sereď	18	(4)
2016–2018	Spartak Trnava B	32	(19)
2017–2018	Spartak Trnava	4	(0)
2018	Nitra	10	(0)
2019	Avanhard Bziv (amateurs)	1	(0)
2020–2021	Hirnyk-Sport Horishni Plavni	36	(3)
2021–2023	Polissya Zhytomyr	18	(0)
2023–2024	Zviahel	18	(3)
2024	Kudrivka	7	(0)
- * Club domestic league appearances and goals as of 21 October 2024

Illya Leonidovych Cherednychenko (Ukrainian: Ілля Леонідович Чередниченко; born 12 June 1995) is a Ukrainian professional footballer who plays as a winger.

== Career ==
Cherednychenko made his professional league debut for Spartak Trnava on 28 July 2017 against Železiarne Podbrezová.

== Honours ==
Polissya Zhytomyr

- Ukrainian First League: 2022–23

Avanhard Bziv

- Ukrainian Amateur Cup: 2018–19
