= Dominik Martišiak =

Slovak footballer

Personal information
- Full name: Dominik Martišiak
- Date of birth: 9 July 2000 (age 26)
- Place of birth: Slovakia
- Position: Winger

Team information
- Current team: Spartak Myjava
- Number: 19

Youth career
- 2007–2019: Senica

Senior career*
Years	Team	Apps	(Gls)
2017–2019	Senica	9	(0)
2019–2021	Baník Ostrava	0	(0)
2019–2020	→ Vítkovice (loan)	19	(2)
2021–	Spartak Myjava	24	(0)

International career^{‡}
2017	Slovakia U17	3	(0)
2018–	Slovakia U19	4	(0)
- * Club domestic league appearances and goals as of 23 May 2023 ‡ National team caps and goals as of 23:13, 12 September 2019 (UTC)

Dominik Martišiak (born 9 July 2000) is a Slovak footballer who plays as a winger for Spartak Myjava in the 2. Liga.

== Club career ==
=== FK Senica ===
Martišiak is an alumnus of Senica's academy. He made a debut for Senica's senior team during a 1–0 victory, substituting Adam Pajer during the stoppage time of the second half. He made the debut before the age of 17, being one of the youngest debutants in the history of the competition.

Nonetheless, in the subsequent two seasons he spent at the club, Martišiak only made sporadic appearance, usually as a substitute, tallying a total of only 9 games. He mostly played in the U19 squad.

Still, in December 2017, he was on a 4-day trial with Scottish club Dundee United.

=== Baník Ostrava ===
On 19 May 2019, Senica announced that Martišiak would leave the club and join Baník Ostrava, starting with the new season. He was immediately loaned out to Czech club MFK Vítkovice for the 2019-20 season.
