= Richard Križan =

Slovak footballer

Personal information
- Full name: Richard Križan
- Date of birth: 23 September 1997 (age 29)
- Place of birth: Plášťovce, Slovakia
- Height: 1.90 m (6 ft 3 in)
- Position: Centre-back

Team information
- Current team: AS Trenčín
- Number: 33

Youth career
- –2015: TJ Družstevník Plášťovce
- 2011–2013: → Slovan Levice (loan)
- 2013–2015: → ČFK Nitra (loan)
- 2015–2016: Nitra

Senior career*
Years	Team	Apps	(Gls)
2016–2018	Nitra	70	(3)
2019	Puskás Akadémia	1	(0)
2019–2021	AS Trenčín	38	(1)
2021–2024	Slovan Bratislava	27	(0)
2024–2025	České Budějovice	11	(0)
2024–2025	České Budějovice B	6	(0)
2025-	AS Trenčín	29	(0)

International career^{‡}
2018	Slovakia U21	1	(0)
- * Club domestic league appearances and goals as of 21 September 2026 ‡ National team caps and goals as of 6 September 2018

Richard Križan (born 23 September 1997) is a Slovak footballer who plays for Slovak club AS Trenčín as a defender.

== Club career ==
=== FC Nitra ===
Križan made his Fortuna Liga debut for Nitra against Žilina on 22 July 2017 during an 1–0 home victory.

=== Dynamo České Budějovice ===
On 15 August 2024, Križan signed a contract with Dynamo České Budějovice until end of the season with option for two more seasons.

== Career statistics ==
=== Club ===
As of match played 31 August 2024

Appearances and goals by club, season and competition
Club	Season	League			National cup		Continental		Total	
Club	Season	Division	Apps	Goals	Apps	Goals	Apps	Goals	Apps	Goals
Nitra	2015-16	Slovak 2. Liga	2	0	—		—		2	0
Nitra	2016-17	Slovak 2. Liga	20	2	3	0	—		23	2
Nitra	2017-18	Slovak 1. Liga	32	0	2	0	—		34	0
Nitra	2018-19	Slovak 1. Liga	16	1	1	0	—		17	1
Nitra	Total		70	3	6	0	—		76	3
Puskás Akadémia	2018-19	Nemzeti Bajnokság I	1	0	0	0	—		1	0
AS Trenčín	2019-20	Slovak 1. Liga	13	0	2	0	—		15	0
AS Trenčín	2020-21	Slovak 1. Liga	24	0	2	0	—		26	0
AS Trenčín	2021-22	Slovak 1. Liga	1	1	—		—		1	1
AS Trenčín	Total		38	1	4	0	—		42	1
Slovan Bratislava	2021-22	Slovak 1. Liga	6	0	—		2 (Note: Appearance(s) in UEFA Europa League)	0	8	0
Slovan Bratislava	2022-23	Slovak 1. Liga	13	0	2	0	1 (Note: Appearance(s) in UEFA Europa Conference League)	0	16	0
Slovan Bratislava	2023-24	Slovak 1. Liga	6	0	1	3	0	0	7	3
Slovan Bratislava	Total		25	0	3	3	3	0	31	3
Slovan Bratislava II	2021-22	Slovak 2. Liga	4	0	—		—		4	0
Slovan Bratislava II	2022-23	Slovak 2. Liga	9	3	—		—		9	3
Slovan Bratislava II	2023-24	Slovak 2. Liga	2	0	—		—		2	0
Slovan Bratislava II	Total		15	3	—		—		15	3
České Budějovice	2024-25	Czech First League	3	0	—		—		3	0
Career Total			152	7	13	3	3	0	168	10

== Honours ==
Slovan Bratislava

- Fortuna Liga: 2021–22, 2022–23
