= Tomáš Smola =

Czech footballer

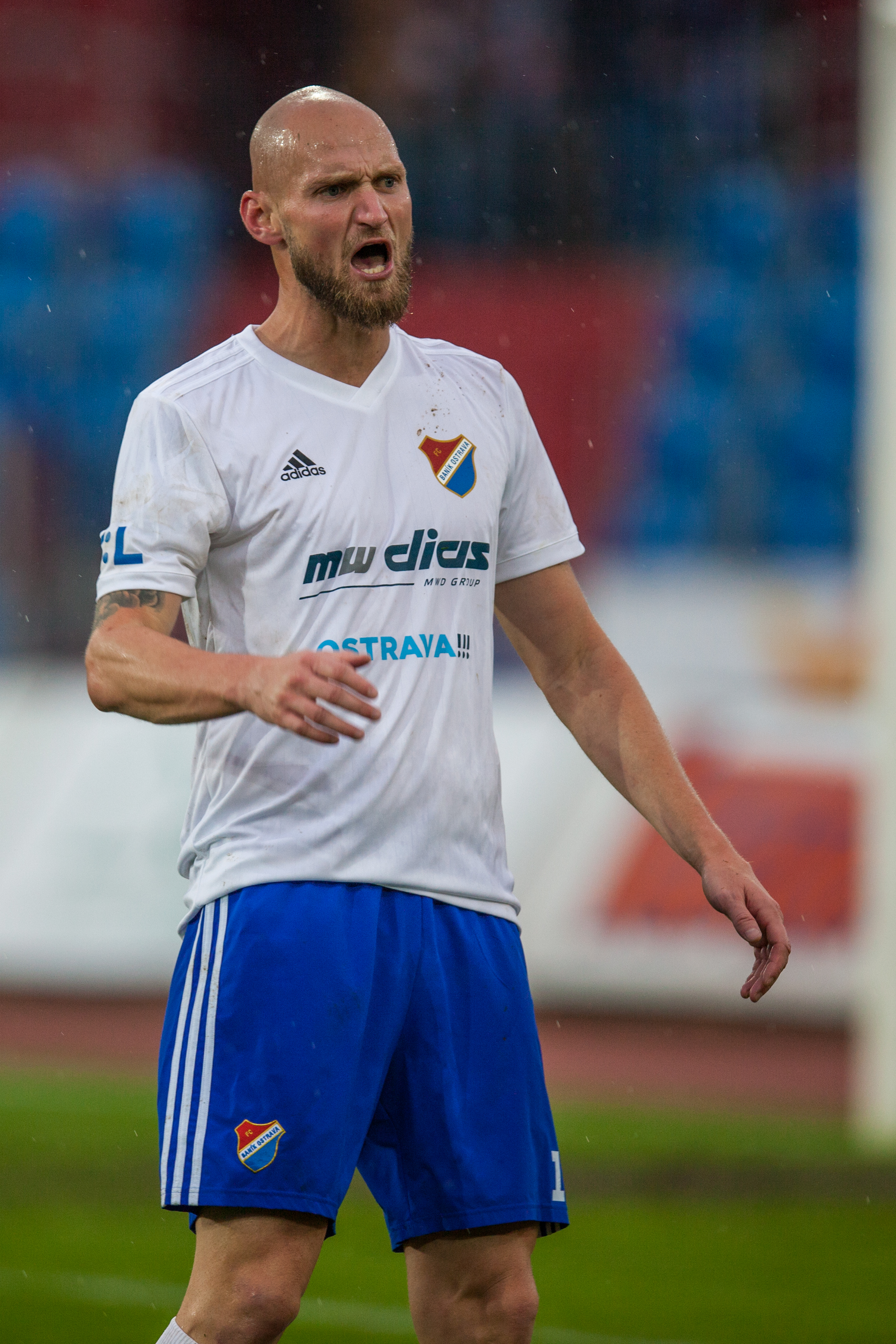
- Smola playing for Baník Ostrava in October 2019

Personal information
- Date of birth: 19 January 1989 (age 37)
- Place of birth: Louny, Czechoslovakia
- Height: 1.91 m (6 ft 3 in)
- Position: Forward

Youth career
- 2008–2009: FK Teplice

Senior career*
| Years | Team | Apps | (Gls) |
| 2009 | Slavoj Vyšehrad | | |
| 2009 | Arsenal Česká Lípa | | |
| 2009–2010 | SK Stap Tratec Vilémov | | |
| 2010–2013 | FC Chomutov | | |
| 2013 | FK Bohemians Praha | 13 | (1) |
| 2013–2016 | Ústí nad Labem | 78 | (22) |
| 2016–2019 | SFC Opava | 85 | (28) |
| 2019–2020 | Baník Ostrava | 21 | (4) |
| 2020–2022 | Gaz Metan Mediaș | 4 | (0) |
| 2021 | → Opava (loan) | 14 | (1) |
- * Club domestic league appearances and goals as of 17:30, 31 January 2021 (UTC)

Tomáš Smola (born 19 January 1989) is a former Czech professional footballer who played as a forward.

== Early life ==
Smola was born in Louny.

== Career ==
Smola signed for Baník Ostrava from SFC Opava in the summer of 2019.
