= Ondrej Vrábel (footballer) =

Slovak footballer

Personal information
- Full name: Ondrej Vrábel
- Date of birth: 23 April 1999 (age 27)
- Place of birth: Topoľčany, Slovakia
- Height: 1.75 m (5 ft 9 in)
- Position: Midfielder

Team information
- Current team: Šamorín

Youth career
- –2010: OFK Bošany
- 2010–2012: Topvar Topoľčany
- 2012–2013: Nitra
- 2014: FK TEMPO Partizánske
- 2014–2016: Topvar Topoľčany
- 2017–2018: Nitra

Senior career*
Years	Team	Apps	(Gls)
2018−2021	Nitra	37	(2)
2021−	Šamorín	0	(0)
- * Club domestic league appearances and goals as of 17 July 2021

Ondrej Vrábel (born 23 April 1999) is a Slovak footballer who plays for FC ŠTK 1914 Šamorín as a midfielder.

== Club career ==
Vrábel made his Fortuna Liga debut for Nitra against Žilina on 27 October 2018. IN the match, Vrábel had replaced Marián Chobot late in the game. Nitra lost 0-2.
