= Ivan Zgrablić =

Croatian footballer (born 1991)

Personal information
- Date of birth: 15 March 1991 (age 35)
- Place of birth: Pula, Croatia
- Height: 1.84 m (6 ft 0 in)
- Position: Centre back

Team information
- Current team: Chions
- Number: 92

Senior career*
Years	Team	Apps	(Gls)
2010–2011	Karlovac	2	(0)
2011–2013	Istra 1961	17	(0)
2013–2017	Cibalia	121	(4)
2018	Istra 1961	11	(0)
2018	Voluntari	9	(0)
2019	Nitra	5	(0)
2019–2020	NK Uljanik		
2020	Cibalia	3	(0)
2020–2021	Opatija	30	(0)
2021–2022	Sambenedettese	11	(0)
2022–	Chions	2	(0)
- * Club domestic league appearances and goals as of 17 September 2023

Ivan Zgrablić (born 15 March 1991) is a Croatian professional footballer who plays as a defender for Italian Serie D club Chions.

In the past Zgrablić played only for Croatian football clubs, such as: Karlovac, Istra 1961, Cibalia and NK Opatija.

== Career ==
In January 2020, Zgrablić returned to Cibalia from NK Uljanik.

On 15 October 2021, he signed for Serie D club Sambenedettese.

== Honours ==
Cibalia

- Croatian Second Football League: 2015–16
