= Milan Ristovski =

Macedonian footballer (born 1998)

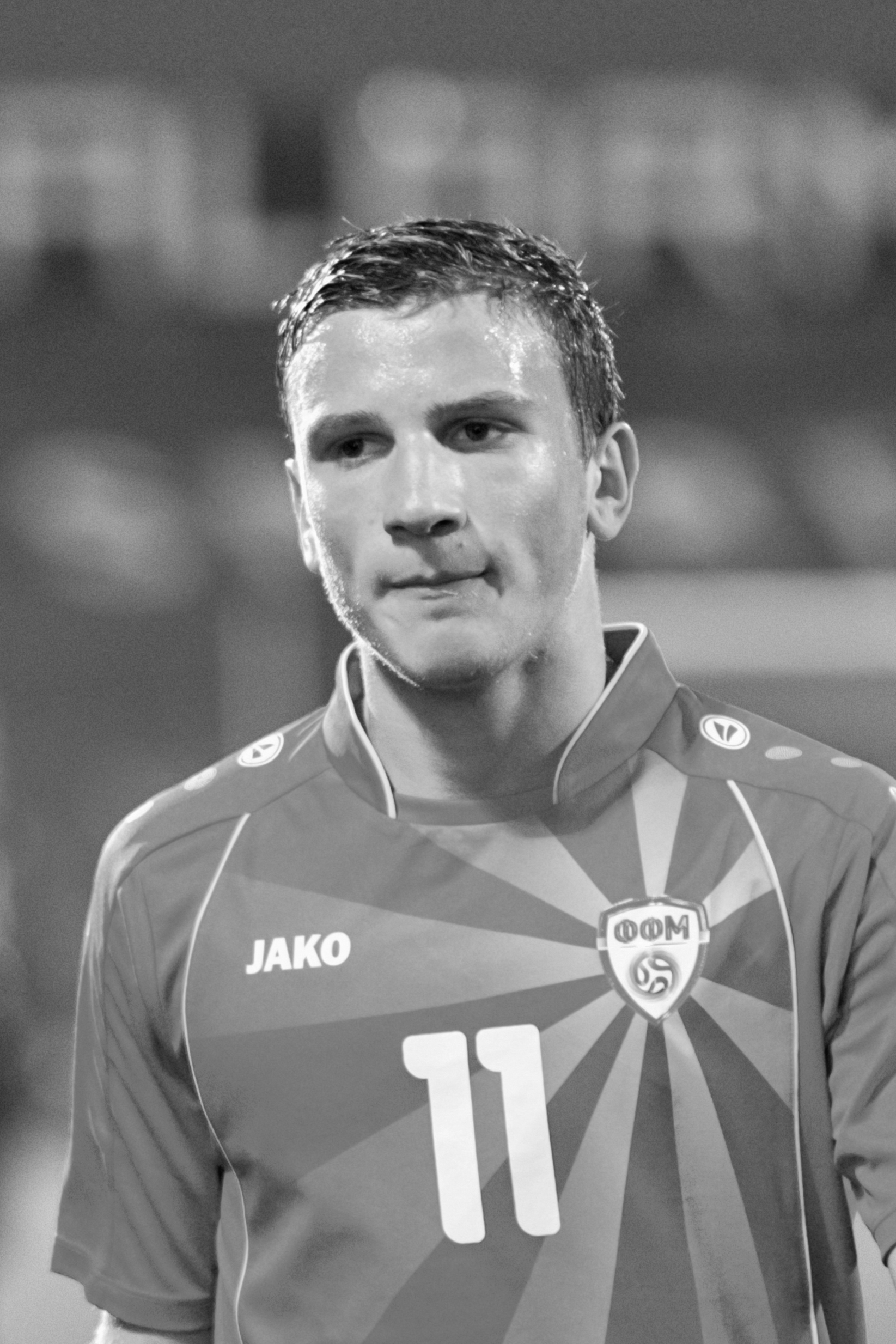
- Ristovski with North Macedonia U21 (2018)

Personal information
- Date of birth: 8 April 1998 (age 28)
- Place of birth: Skopje, North Macedonia
- Height: 1.88 m (6 ft 2 in)
- Position: Forward

Team information
- Current team: Bhayangkara Presisi
- Number: 7

Youth career
- 2010–2016: Rabotnički Skopje
- 2017–2018: Rijeka

Senior career*
Years	Team	Apps	(Gls)
2014–2017	Rabotnički Skopje	29	(1)
2017–2021	Rijeka	7	(0)
2018–2019	→ Krško (loan)	16	(2)
2019–2020	→ Nitra (loan)	27	(11)
2021	→ Spartak Trnava (loan)	12	(5)
2021–2023	Spartak Trnava	72	(12)
2024–2026	Bohemians 1905	69	(5)
2026–	Bhayangkara Presisi	1	(0)

International career^{‡}
2014	Macedonia U17	2	(1)
2014	Macedonia U18	1	(1)
2016	Macedonia U19	2	(0)
2018–2020	North Macedonia U21	16	(2)
2021–	North Macedonia	40	(4)
- * Club domestic league appearances and goals as of 5 September 2026 ‡ National team caps and goals as of 16:56, 5 October 2026 (UTC)

Milan Ristovski (Macedonian: Милан Ристовски; born 8 April 1998) is a Macedonian professional footballer who plays as a forward for Super League club Bhayangkara Presisi and the North Macedonia national team.

== Club career ==
Ristovski began his career with his hometown club Rabotnički Skopje where he made his professional debut, age 16, on 22 November 2014. In February 2017 he was loaned to Rijeka in Croatia until June 2017, where he joined his older brother Stefan. In July 2017, he was once again loaned to Rijeka with a buying option, this time for the entire season. He made his Rijeka debut on 10 December 2017, when he came on as a substitution in the Croatian First Football League match against Slaven Belupo.

After half-season loan with the club, in July 2021, he signed with Spartak Trnava on a three-year contract. Ristovski became the club's most expensive arrival, arriving from Rijeka for a further undisclosed sum.

On 1 January 2024, Ristovski signed a long-term contract with Czech First League club Bohemians 1905.

== International career ==
Ristovski was capped for North Macedonia's under-17, under-19, and under-21 national teams.

He made his debut for North Macedonia national football team on 4 June 2021 in a friendly against Kazakshtan and scored his team's third goal in a 4–0 victory.

== Personal life ==
His older brother Stefan is also a professional footballer who plays for Dinamo Zagreb and North Macedonia national team. Ristovski speaks Slovak fluently. He is a Christian.

== Career statistics ==
=== Career ===
As of 16 March 2024

Appearances and goals by club, season and competition
Club	Season	League			National cup		Continental		Other		Total	
Club	Season	Division	Apps	Goals	Apps	Goals	Apps	Goals	Apps	Goals	Apps	Goals
Rabotnički Skopje	2014-15	Macedonian First Football League	6	0	—		—		—		6	0
Rabotnički Skopje	2015-16	Macedonian First Football League	18	1	2	0	1 (Note: Appearance(s) in UEFA Europa League)	0	1 (Note: Appearance in Macedonian Football Supercup)	0	22	1
Rabotnički Skopje	2016-17	Macedonian First Football League	5	0	—		0	0	—		5	0
Rabotnički Skopje	Total		29	1	2	0	1	0	1	0	33	1
Rijeka	2017-18	Croatian Football League	1	0	—		—		—		1	0
Rijeka	2018-19	Croatian Football League	3	0	0	0	—		—		3	0
Rijeka	2020-21	Croatian Football League	3	0	—		0	0	—		3	0
Rijeka	Total		7	0	0	0	0	0	—		7	0
Krško (loan)	2018-19	Slovenian PrvaLiga	16	2	4	0	—		—		20	2
Nitra (loan)	2019-20	Slovak First Football League	27	11	3	3	—		2 (Note: Appearance(s) in League Playoffs)	1	32	15
Spartak Trnava (loan)	2020-21	Slovak First Football League	12	5	1	0	—		—		13	5
Spartak Trnava	2021-22	Slovak First Football League	30	8	6	1	4 (Note: Appearance(s) in UEFA Europa Conference League)	0	—		40	9
Spartak Trnava	2022-23	Slovak First Football League	28	3	6	1	3	0	—		37	4
Spartak Trnava	2023-24	Slovak First Football League	13	1	1	0	7	0	—		21	1
Spartak Trnava	Total		84	17	14	2	14	0	—		111	19
Bohemians 1905	2023-24	Czech First League	5	0	—		—		—		5	0
Career Total			168	31	20	5	15	0	3	1	206	37

=== International ===
As of 1 June 2026

Appearances and goals by national team and year
National team	Year	Apps	Goals
North Macedonia	2021	8	2
North Macedonia	2022	7	1
North Macedonia	2023	7	1
North Macedonia	2024	8	0
North Macedonia	2025	7	0
North Macedonia	2026	3	0
Total		40	4

As of match played 2 June 2022. North Macedonia score listed first, score column indicates score after each Ristovski goal.

International goals by date, venue, cap, opponent, score, result and competition
No.	Date	Venue	Cap	Opponent	Score	Result	Competition
1.	4 June 2021	Toše Proeski Arena, Skopje, North Macedonia	1	Kazakhstan	3–0	4–0	Friendly
2.	11 November 2021	Vazgen Sargsyan Republican Stadium, Yerevan, Armenia	7	Armenia	4–0	5–0	2022 FIFA World Cup qualification
3.	2 June 2022	Huvepharma Arena, Razgrad, Bulgaria	11	Bulgaria	1–1	1–1	2022–23 UEFA Nations League C
4.	17 October 2023	Stadion Blagoj Istatov, Strumica, North Macedonia	20	Armenia	2–0	3–1	Friendly

== Honours ==
Rijeka

- Croatian Cup: 2018–19

Spartak Trnava

- Slovak Cup: 2021–22, 2022–23
