= Xaverov =

- Municipality
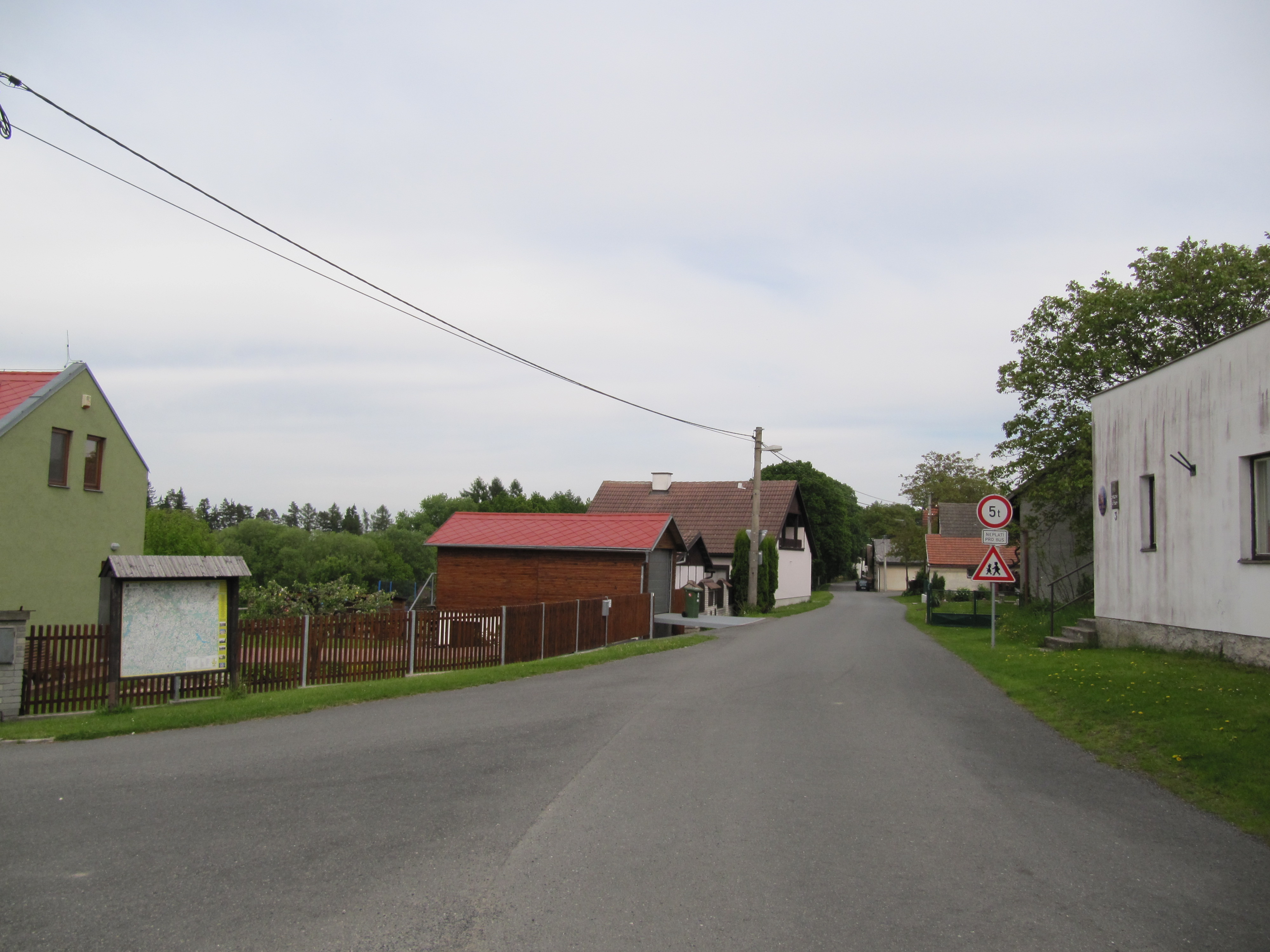
- Centre of Xaverov

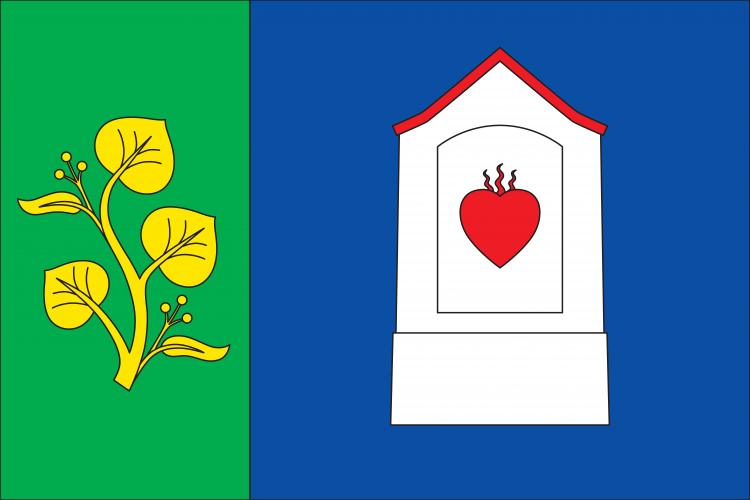
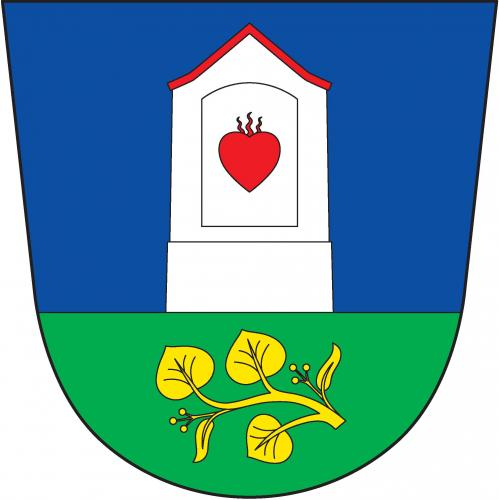
- Flag Coat of arms

- Location in the Czech Republic
- Coordinates: 49°50′34″N 14°53′8″E
- Country: Czech Republic
- Region: Central Bohemian
- District: Benešov
- First mentioned: 1788

Area
  - Total: 2.17 km^{2} (0.84 sq mi)
- Elevation: 460 m (1,510 ft)

Population (2026-01-01)
  - Total: 57
  - Density: 26/km^{2} (68/sq mi)
- Time zone: UTC+1 (CET)
  - Summer (DST): UTC+2 (CEST)
- Postal code: 285 06
- Website: www.obecxaverov.cz

Xaverov is a municipality and village in Benešov District in the Central Bohemian Region of the Czech Republic. It has about 60 inhabitants.

== Demographics ==
Historical population
Year	Pop.	±%
1869	174	—
1880	191	+9.8%
1890	188	−1.6%
1900	185	−1.6%
1910	163	−11.9%
1921	144	−11.7%
1930	127	−11.8%
1950	94	−26.0%
1961	109	+16.0%
1970	88	−19.3%
1980	51	−42.0%
1991	41	−19.6%
2001	56	+36.6%
2011	66	+17.9%
2021	54	−18.2%
Source: Censuses
