= Nemanja Soković =

Serbian footballer

Personal information
- Full name: Nemanja Soković
- Date of birth: 8 May 1996 (age 30)
- Place of birth: Novi Sad, FR Yugoslavia
- Height: 1.92 m (6 ft 4 in)
- Position: Centre-forward

Team information
- Current team: Tisa Adorjan

Youth career
- ČSK Čelarevo

Senior career*
Years	Team	Apps	(Gls)
2014	ČSK Čelarevo	10	(1)
2015	Teleoptik	10	(1)
2015–2016	Radnički Šid	14	(2)
2016	Cement Beočin	10	(5)
2017	OFK Odžaci	3	(0)
2017	Crvena Zvezda Novi Sad	10	(3)
2018–2019	Cement Beočin	31	(12)
2019	Nitra	12	(1)
2019	1. Maj Ruma	10	(1)
2020–2022	Ripensia Timișoara	31	(6)
2022	Concordia Chiajna	8	(0)
2022–2023	PAEEK	12	(0)
2023–2024	Vojvodina	0	(0)
2023	→ Kabel (loan)	13	(6)
2024–	Tisa Adorjan	0	(0)
- * Club domestic league appearances and goals as of 18 November 2023

Nemanja Soković (Serbian Cyrillic: Немања Соковић; born 8 May 1996) is a professional Serbian footballer who plays as a forward for Tisa Adorjan.

== Career ==
Born in Novi Sad, Nemanja started his career playing for ČSK Čelarevo. Later he played for Teleoptik, Radnički Šid, Cement Beočin twice, OFK Odžaci and Crvena Zvezda NS.

=== Nitra ===
Soković made his professional Fortuna Liga debut for Nitra against Železiarne Podbrezová on February 16, 2019, he started and assisted on the opening goal of the match.

=== Concordia Chiajna ===
After playing for Romanian Liga II side Ripensia Timișoara, Soković signed a contract in January 2022 with the Concordia Chiajna, a team from the same league.

=== PAEEK ===
On 18 June 2022, Soković signed for Cypriot Second Division club PAEEK. He was released from the club 6 months later.

=== Vojvodina and loan to Kabel ===
In summer transfer window, Soković signed a contract with Serbian SuperLiga club Vojvodina. He was immediately sent on loan to Serbian League Vojvodina club Kabel.
