= Marián Chobot =

Slovak footballer

Personal information
- Date of birth: 31 August 1999 (age 27)
- Place of birth: Topoľčany, Slovakia
- Height: 1.77 m (5 ft 10 in)
- Positions: Forward; right-back

Team information
- Current team: Ružomberok
- Number: 20

Youth career
- 2008: TJ Zlatý Klas Urmice
- 2009–2019: Nitra

Senior career*
| Years | Team | Apps | (Gls) |
| 2018–2021 | Nitra | 69 | (7) |
| 2021–2023 | Slovan Bratislava | 0 | (0) |
| 2021–2022 | → ViOn Zlaté Moravce (loan) | 6 | (1) |
| 2023– | Ružomberok | 78 | (2) |

International career^{‡}
| 2018 | Slovakia U20 | 1 | (0) |
| 2019–2020 | Slovakia U21 | 12 | (0) |
- * Club domestic league appearances and goals as of 22 September 2026 ‡ National team caps and goals as of 17 November 2020

Marián Chobot (born 31 August 1999) is a Slovak football player. He currently plays for Ružomberok and had previously featured for Slovakia U21.

== Club career ==
He made his Fortuna Liga debut for Nitra on 28 July 2018 in a game against Žilina. Chobot played from start, but was replaced by Christián Steinhübel after 54 minutes. Žilina won the game 2-1.

On 20 July 2023, Chobot moved to Niké liga side Ružomberok. He made a contract for the next two seasons.
