= Jaroslav Machovec =

Slovak footballer

Personal information
- Full name: Jaroslav Machovec
- Date of birth: 5 September 1986 (age 40)
- Place of birth: Rakovník, Czechoslovakia
- Height: 1.92 m (6 ft 4 in)
- Positions: Defender; midfielder

Team information
- Current team: SC Kittsee
- Number: 6

Youth career
- 1992–2007: Nitra

Senior career*
Years	Team	Apps	(Gls)
2007–2008	Nitra	5	(0)
2008	Ayia Napa	0	(0)
2009	Odra Wodzisław	2	(0)
2009	Ahva Arraba	6	(1)
2010	Petržalka	13	(1)
2010–2011	Spartak Trnava	29	(2)
2011–2015	České Budějovice	88	(14)
2015	Ostrava	10	(1)
2016	Myjava	30	(1)
2017	GKS Tychy	6	(0)
2017–2019	Nitra	35	(2)
2019	FC Rohrendorf	11	(0)
2020–	SC Kittsee	63	(13)
- * Club domestic league appearances and goals as of 00:17, 31 March 2024 (UTC)

Jaroslav Machovec (born 5 September 1986) is a Slovak footballer who plays as a defender or midfielder for Austrian club SC Kittsee.

== Career ==
Machovec spent one season with Nitra, appearing in five league matches. He came to Spartak Trnava in summer 2010.

In July 2019, Machovec joined Austrian club FC Rohrendorf. He left the club again in November 2019. He then joined SC Kittsee in January 2020.
