= Dominik Guláš =

Slovak footballer

Personal information
- Full name: Dominik Guláš
- Date of birth: 28 June 1999 (age 27)
- Place of birth: Nitra, Slovakia
- Height: 1.70 m (5 ft 7 in)
- Position: Forward

Team information
- Current team: Loosdorf ASK

Youth career
- –2012: Spartak Vráble
- 2012–2015: ViOn Zlaté Moravce
- 2012–2015: Nitra

Senior career*
Years	Team	Apps	(Gls)
2018–2021	Nitra	17	(0)
2021–2022	SC Melk		
2021–2022	SVg ATP Metallbau Purgstall		
2022–	Loosdorf ASK		

International career^{‡}
2015	Slovakia U17	2	(0)
- * Club domestic league appearances and goals as of 27 July 2021 ‡ National team caps and goals as of 26 October 2015

Dominik Guláš (born 28 June 1999) is a Slovak footballer who plays for Loosdorf ASK as a forward.

== Club career ==
=== FC Nitra ===
Guláš made his Fortuna Liga debut for Nitra against AS Trenčín on 18 February 2018. Guláš came on as a replacement for Christián Steinhübel in stoppage time. The game concluded in a 1–1 tie.
