= 2019–20 ŠKF Sereď season =

Sereď
2019–20 season
- Manager: Slavche Vojneski (from 29 June 2019 to 7 December 2019); Roland Praj (from 20 December 2019 to 9 February 2020); Peter Lérant (from 9 February 2020)
- Stadium: Štadión Sereď (Home stadium); Stadium Myjava; Štadión FC ViOn; Štadión pod Zoborom (Temporary stadiums)
- Slovak First Football League: 9th
- Slovak Cup: Quarter-finals
- Top goalscorer: League: Dino Špehar (5); All: Dino Špehar (11)
- Highest home attendance: 694 v Slovan Bratislava (17 August 2019, Slovak First Football League)
- Lowest home attendance: 203 v Trenčín (28 September 2019, Slovak First Football League)
- Average home league attendance: 392
- Biggest win: 10–0 v Belá (Away, 11 September 2019, Slovak Cup)
- Biggest defeat: 0–4 v Slovan Bratislava (Home, 17 August 2019, Slovak First Football League)
Home colours	Away colours	Third colours

The 2019–20 season was Športový Klub Futbalu Sereď's 2nd consecutive season in Slovak First Football League. In addition to the domestic league, Sereď participated in this season's editions of Slovak Cup.

== Squad ==
As of 8 December 2019

Note: Flags indicate national team as defined under FIFA eligibility rules; some limited exceptions apply. Players may hold more than one non-FIFA nationality.

No.	Pos.	Nation	Player
1	GK	MKD	Dejan Iliev
3	DF	SRB	Nikola Unković
4	DF	SVK	Tomáš Hučko
5	DF	SVK	Martin Mečiar
9	MF	CRO	Roko Jureškin
10	MF	BRA	Cléber
11	FW	SVK	Ľubomír Ulrich
12	MF	SVK	Matej Loduha
13	MF	SRB	Filip Pankarićan
14	FW	SVK	Adam Morong

No.	Pos.	Nation	Player
17	DF	SVK	Kristián Lukáčik
18	MF	NGR	Bankole Adekuoroye
19	MF	SVK	Denis Ventúra
21	DF	SEN	Tidiane Djiby Ba
22	MF	SVK	Alex Iván
23	MF	CZE	Miroslav Tureček
25	FW	CRO	Dino Špehar
28	GK	SVK	Radovan Hodál
33	GK	SVK	Pavol Penksa
96	DF	SVK	Martin Slaninka

== Transfers ==
=== Summer ===
In: Note: Flags indicate national team as defined under FIFA eligibility rules; some limited exceptions apply. Players may hold more than one non-FIFA nationality.

No.	Pos.	Nation	Player
—	DF	SRB	Nikola Unković (from (Serbia) FK Stepojevac Vaga)
—	GK	MKD	Dejan Iliev (on loan from (England) Arsenal F.C.)
—	DF	SVK	Martin Slaninka (from (Czech Republic) 1. SK Prostějov)
—	GK	SVK	Radovan Hodál (from MŠK Slovan Trenčianske Teplice)
—	MF	CRO	Roko Jureškin (from (Croatia) Hajduk Split)
—	MF	BRA	Cléber Nascimento da Silva (from FC ViOn Zlaté Moravce)
—	MF	SVK	Kristián Lukáčik (from FK Železiarne Podbrezová)
—	MF	CZE	Miroslav Tureček (from (Czech Republic) FC Fastav Zlín)
—	MF	BRA	Matheus Olavo (on loan from (Brazil) Londrina)
—	MF	NGR	Solomon Omale (from (Nigeria) Sokoto United)
—	FW	NGR	Christian Attah Junior (from (Nigeria) Galadima Football Academy)
—	FW	CYP	Panagiotis Louka (on loan from (Italy) Atalanta)
—	MF	SLO	Maj Rorič (on loan from (Italy) Internazionale)
—	DF	BRA	Bruno Dip (on loan from (Brazil) São Paulo B)

Out: Note: Flags indicate national team as defined under FIFA eligibility rules; some limited exceptions apply. Players may hold more than one non-FIFA nationality.

No.	Pos.	Nation	Player
—	FW	TTO	Kathon St. Hillaire (Released)
—	FW	FRA	Ondong Mba (Released)
—	DF	SVK	Róbert Richnák (to FC Petržalka)
—	GK	NGR	David Samuel Nwolokor (loan return to (Croatia) HNK Rijeka)
—	DF	SVK	Jozef Menich (to FC Spartak Trnava)
—	FW	SVK	Marek Kuzma (on loan to FK Dubnica)
—	DF	SVK	Matej Dybala (loan return to MŠK Žilina)
—	MF	SVK	Rudolf Bilas (End of contract)
—	FW	SVK	Miloš Lačný (Released)
—	DF	CZE	Martin Sus (Released)
—	DF	SVK	Ľubomír Michalík (Released)

=== Winter ===
In: Note: Flags indicate national team as defined under FIFA eligibility rules; some limited exceptions apply. Players may hold more than one non-FIFA nationality.

No.	Pos.	Nation	Player
6	DF	SVK	Ľubomír Michalík (from (Slovakia) Slovan Galanta)
—	FW	BIH	Senad Jarović (from (Denmark) SønderjyskE)
—	MF	MKD	Filip Duranski (from (North Macedonia) Sileks)
—	GK	BIH	Adnan Kanurić (from (England) Stoke City U23s)
—	MF	CZE	Nicolas Šumský (from (Czech Republic) Frýdek-Místek)
—	FW	CRO	Matej Vuk (on loan from (Croatia) Rijeka)
—	MF	SVK	Denis Potoma (on loan from (Slovakia) Slovan Bratislava)
—	FW	AUT	Aleksandar Vucenovic (from (Austria) SKN St. Pölten)

Out: Note: Flags indicate national team as defined under FIFA eligibility rules; some limited exceptions apply. Players may hold more than one non-FIFA nationality.

No.	Pos.	Nation	Player
—	GK	MKD	Dejan Iliev (loan return to (England) Arsenal)
—	FW	SVK	Ľubomír Ulrich (to Spartak Myjava)
—	MF	SVK	Denis Ventúra (end of contract and joined (Romania) Academica Clinceni)
—	MF	BRA	Matheus Olavo (loan return to (Brazil) Londrina)
—	DF	BIH	Abdel Metalsi (released)
—	DF	BRA	Bruno Rapanelli (loan return to (Brazil) São Paulo)
—	DF	SRB	Nikola Unković (on loan to (Slovakia) Šamorín)
—	FW	CRO	Roko Jureškin (on loan to MŠK Žilina II)

== Competitions ==
=== Overview ===
Competition	First match	Last match	Starting round	Final position	Record							
Competition	First match	Last match	Starting round	Final position	Pld	W	D	L	GF	GA	GD	Win %
Slovak First Football League	21 July 2019	11 July 2020	Matchday 1	9th	27	6	9	12	29	41	−12	22.22
Slovak Cup	14 August 2019	4 March 2020	Second round	Quarter-finals	5	4	0	1	19	2	+17	80.00
Total					32	10	9	13	48	43	+5	31.25

Source: Competitions

=== Slovak First Football League ===
==== Regular season ====
===== League table =====
Pos	Team	Pld	W	D	L	GF	GA	GD	Pts	Qualification
7	Trenčín	22	7	6	9	39	35	+4	27	Qualification for the relegation group
8	Zlaté Moravce	22	6	8	8	22	28	−6	26	Qualification for the relegation group
9	Senica	22	6	6	10	24	33	−9	24	Qualification for the relegation group
10	Sereď	22	5	7	10	23	34	−11	22	Qualification for the relegation group
11	Nitra	22	5	4	13	17	31	−14	19	Qualification for the relegation group
12	Pohronie	22	3	7	12	19	38	−19	16	Qualification for the relegation group

Source: Niké liga (in Slovak)
Rules for classification: 1) Points; 2) Head-to-head points; 3) Head-to-head goal difference; 4) Head-to-head away goals scored; 5) Play-off.

===== Results summary =====
Overall								Home						Away					
Pld	W	D	L	GF	GA	GD	Pts	W	D	L	GF	GA	GD	W	D	L	GF	GA	GD
22	5	7	10	23	34	−11	22	3	4	4	13	19	−6	2	3	6	10	15	−5

Source: Fortuna liga

===== Results by round =====
Round	1	2	3	4	5	6	7	8	9	10	11	12	13	14	15	16	17	18	19	20	21	22
Ground	A	H	H	A	H	A	H	A	H	H	A	H	A	A	H	A	H	A	H	A	A	H
Result	L	W	W	L	L	D	D	D	D	D	L	W	W	D	L	L	L	L	D	W	L	L
Position	11	7	4	5	7	7	7	7	8	8	9	7	6	6	7	8	10	10	10	10	10	10
Points	0	3	6	6	6	7	8	9	10	11	11	14	17	18	18	18	18	18	19	22	22	22

Source: Worldfootball
A = Away; H = Home; W = Win; D = Draw; L = Loss

===== Matches =====
21 July 2019 1	Spartak Trnava	2–0	Sereď	Trnava
19:00 CEST (UTC+2)	Mitrea (yellow card) 15', (goal) 59' (pen.); Halilović 19'; Dangubić (yellow card) 44'; Záhumenský (yellow card) 72'; Tešija (yellow card) 73'	Report	Michalík (yellow card) 11'; Špehar (yellow card) 18'; Sus (yellow card) 34'; Djiby Ba (yellow card) 39'; Slaninka (yellow card) 57'; Jureškin (yellow card) 90'	Stadium: Štadión Antona Malatinského; Attendance: 3,918; Referee: Boris Marhefka; Assistant referees: Dušan Hrčka, Andrej Hrmo

27 July 2019 2	Sereď	2–1	Senica	Myjava
19:00 CEST (UTC+2)	Djiby Ba 58'; Sus (yellow card) 59'; Pankarićan 87'	Report	Castañeda (yellow card) 57', (goal) 60' (pen.); Otrísal (yellow card) 79'	Stadium: Stadium Myjava; Attendance: 425; Referee: Erik Gemzický; Assistant referees: Radoslav Bobko, Pavel Jánošík

4 August 2019 3	Sereď	3–1	DAC Dunajská Streda	Myjava
19:00 CEST (UTC+2)	Hučko (yellow card) 42', (goal) 74'; Cléber (yellow card) 63'; Ventúra 69' (pen.); Špehar 76'; Jureškin (yellow card) 83'	Report	Davis (yellow card) 38'; K. Vida (yellow card) 61'; Blackman (yellow card) 81'; Kalmár 84' (pen.); Švec (yellow card) 90'	Stadium: Stadium Myjava; Attendance: 658; Referee: Ladislav Prešinský; Assistant referees: Tomáš Somoláni, Ján Pozor

10 August 2019 4	Nitra	3–2	Sereď	Nitra
19:00 CEST (UTC+2)	Chobot 30'; Ristovski 49', 67' (pen.); Fábry (yellow card) 87'; Faško (yellow card) 90'	Report	Ventúra (yellow card) 25'; Michalík (yellow card) 57'; Djiby Ba (yellow card) 66' (yellow-red card) 90'; Špehar 75'; Jureškin 78'	Stadium: Štadión pod Zoborom; Attendance: 874; Referee: Dušan Sedlák; Assistant referees: Branislav Hancko, Anton Perát

17 August 2019 5	Sereď	0–4	Slovan Bratislava	Myjava
19:00 CEST (UTC+2)	Jureškin (yellow card) 49'; Hučko (yellow card) 52'; Slaninka (yellow card) 90'	Report	Bajrić 25'; Sukhotskyi 42'; Šporar 65'; Ratão 90'	Stadium: Stadium Myjava; Attendance: 694; Referee: Peter Ziemba; Assistant referees: , Miroslav Benko, Milan Štrbo

24 August 2019 6	Zemplín Michalovce	1–1	Sereď	Michalovce
19:00 CEST (UTC+2)	Vojtko 17', (yellow card) 87'; Kolesár (yellow card) 69'	Report	Cléber 9'; Iliev (yellow card) 41'; Olavo (yellow card) 72'; Lukáčik (yellow card) 82'	Stadium: Mestský futbalový štadión Attendance: 1,478; Referee: Adam Somoláni; Assistant referees: Erik Weiss, Marek Galo

31 August 2019 7	Sereď	3–3	Pohronie	Myjava
19:00 CEST (UTC+2)	Iván 8'; Nosko 58' (o.g.); Hučko 60'; Adekuoroye (yellow card) 90'	Report	Nosko (yellow card) 5'; Zachara 14'; Abrahám 19'; Jacko 90'	Stadium: Stadium Myjava; Attendance: 420; Referee: Jozef Pavlík; Assistant referees: Tomáš Vorel, Mária Súkeníková

14 September 2019 8	Ružomberok	1–1	Sereď	Ružomberok
19:00 CEST (UTC+2)	Qose 28'; Gerec (yellow card) 77'; Zsigmund (yellow card) 78'	Report	Dabó (yellow card) 45'; Morong 75'; Pankarićan (yellow card) 81'	Stadium: Štadión pod Čebraťom; Attendance: 1,248; Referee: Boris Marhefka; Assistant referees: Peter Kováč, Martin Borsányi

21 September 2019 9	Sereď	0–0	Zlaté Moravce	Myjava
19:00 CEST (UTC+2)		Report	Gustavo (yellow card) 73'; Sloboda (yellow card) 80'	Stadium: Stadium Myjava; Attendance: 212; Referee: Bystrík Nemček; Assistant referees: Milan Štrbo, Dušan Hrčka

28 September 2019 10	Sereď	1–1	Trenčín	Myjava
16:30 CEST (UTC+2)	Slaninka (yellow card) 65'; Djiby Ba 69'	Report	Ligeon (yellow card) 24'; Julien 45'; Zubairu (yellow card) 60'	Stadium: Stadium Myjava; Attendance: 203; Referee: Pavol Chmura; Assistant referees: Marek Galo, Pavel Jánošík

5 October 2019 11	Žilina	1–0	Sereď	Žilina
17:00 CEST (UTC+2)	Bernát 1'; Demiri (yellow card) 41'; Jánošík (yellow card) 85'	Report	Rorič (yellow card) 14'; Djiby Ba (yellow card) 56'; Ventúra (yellow card) 70'	Stadium: Štadión pod Dubňom; Attendance: 1,704; Referee: Pavel Ochotnický; Assistant referees: Ján Pozor, Andrej Hrmo

19 October 2019 12	Sereď	2–1	Spartak Trnava	Myjava
17:00 CEST (UTC+2)	Morong 7'; Pankarićan (yellow card) 23'; Djiby Ba 60'; Slaninka (yellow card) 76'; Dabó (yellow card) 90'	Report	Lovat (yellow card) 41'; Marinković (yellow card) 42'; Mitrea 78'; Sobczyk (yellow card) 80'	Stadium: Stadium Myjava; Attendance: 644; Referee: Peter Ziemba; Assistant referees: Daniel Poláček, Rastislav Žákech

26 October 2019 13	Senica	0–1	Sereď	Senica
17:00 CEST (UTC+2)	Cascardo (yellow card) 4'; Cvek (yellow card) 38'	Report	Dabó (yellow card) 76'; Cascardo 79' (o.g.); Ventúra (yellow card) 90'	Stadium: OMS ARENA Senica

2 November 2019 14	DAC Dunajská Streda	0–0	Sereď	Dunajská Streda
17:00 CET (UTC+1)	M. Vida (yellow card) 40'; K. Vida (yellow card) 55'	Report	Rorič (yellow card) 63'; Cléber (yellow card) 90'	Stadium: MOL Aréna; Attendance: 6,887; Referee: Boris Marhefka; Assistant referees: František Ferenc, Adam Jekkel

9 November 2019 15	Sereď	0–1	Nitra	Myjava
17:00 CET (UTC+1)		Report	Ristovski 73'; Bilovský (yellow card) 86'	Stadium: Stadium Myjava; Attendance: 224; Referee: Jozef Pavlík; Assistant referees: Tomáš Vorel, Martin Vitko

23 November 2019 16	Slovan Bratislava	2–0	Sereď	Bratislava
16:00 CET (UTC+1)	Holman (yellow card) 58'; Šporar 77', 82'; Ljubičić (yellow card) 79'	Report		Stadium: Tehelné pole Attendance: 4,371; Referee: Boris Marhefka; Assistant referees: Erik Weiss, Gabriel Ádám

30 November 2019 17	Sereď	0–2	Zemplín Michalovce	Myjava
14:00 CET (UTC+1)	Metalsi (yellow card) 24'; Lukáčik (yellow card) 45'; Slaninka (yellow card) 60'	Report	Sidibé 80'; Hovhannisyan 90', (yellow card) 90'	Stadium: Stadium Myjava; Attendance: 240; Referee: Michal Smolák; Assistant referees: Marek Galo, Pavel Jánošík

7 December 2019 18	Pohronie	2–1	Sereď	Žiar nad Hronom
14:00 CET (UTC+1)	Mészáros 25'; Badolo 88'	Report	Djiby Ba (yellow card) 30'; Morong (yellow card) 45'; Špehar 81'; Iván (yellow card) 89'; Mečiar (yellow card) 89'	Stadium: Mestský štadión Attendance: 701; Referee: Filip Glova; Assistant referees: Tomáš Vorel, Martin Borsányi

15 February 2020 19	Sereď	2–2	Ružomberok	Zlaté Moravce
14:00 CET (UTC+1)	Duranski (yellow card) 48'; Morong 51'; Michalík (yellow card) 56'; Šumský (yellow card) 78'; Jarović (yellow card) 83'; Vuk 90'	Report	Twardzik 23', (yellow card) 51'; Mojžiš (yellow card) 39' (yellow-red card) 42'; Gerec (yellow card) 56', (goal) 68'; Kojnok (yellow card) 86'; Krajčírik (yellow card) 87'	Stadium: Štadión FC ViOn; Attendance: 316; Referee: Dušan Sedlák; Assistant referees: Erik Weiss, Pavel Jánošík

22 February 2020 20	Zlaté Moravce	1–3	Sereď	Zlaté Moravce
14:00 CET (UTC+1)	Richtárech 28'; Asanović (yellow card) 85'	Report	Duranski (yellow card) 37'; Hučko 43'; Potoma 69'; Pankarićan 72'; Djiby Ba (yellow card) 76'; Jarović (yellow card) 85'	Stadium: Štadión FC ViOn; Attendance: 982; Referee: Pavel Ochotnický; Assistant referees: Radoslav Bobko, Martin Vitko

1 March 2020 21	Trenčín	2–1	Sereď	Zlaté Moravce
15:30 CET (UTC+1)	Čataković 25'; Kapuadi (yellow card) 28'; Šulek (yellow card) 51'; Van Kessel 57'	Report	Vuk 5'; Hučko (yellow card) 82'; Dabó (red card) 87'	Stadium: Štadión FC ViOn; Attendance: 293; Referee: Jozef Pavlík; Assistant referees: Milan Štrbo, Daniel Poláček

7 March 2020 22	Sereď	0–3	Žilina	Nitra
15:30 CET (UTC+1)	Michalík (yellow card) 52' (yellow-red card) 87'	Report	Ďuriš 38'; Kurminowski 43'; Minárik (yellow card) 58'; Vallo 60'	Stadium: Štadión pod Zoborom; Attendance: 420; Referee: Michal Smolák; Assistant referees: Marek Galo, Tomáš Straka

==== Relegation group ====
===== League table =====
Pos	Team	Pld	W	D	L	GF	GA	GD	Pts	Qualification or relegation	TRE	ZLM	SER	SEN	POH	NIT
7	Trenčín	27	11	6	10	52	43	+9	39	Qualification for the Europa League play-offs	—	—	3–2	—	4–0	0–3
8	Zlaté Moravce	27	8	9	10	27	33	−6	33		2–3	—	1–0	—	—	2–1
9	Sereď	27	6	9	12	29	41	−12	27		—	—	—	—	2–2	1–0
10	Senica	27	6	8	13	26	40	−14	26		1–3	0–0	1–1	—	—	—
11	Pohronie	27	6	8	13	25	44	−19	26		—	1–0	—	1–0	—	—
12	Nitra	27	7	4	16	23	36	−13	25	Qualification for the relegation play-offs	—	—	—	2–0	0–2	—

Source: Niké liga (in Slovak)
Legend: Blue = home team win; Yellow = draw; Red = away team win.
Rules for classification: 1) Points; 2) Head-to-head points; 3) Head-to-head goal difference; 4) Head-to-head away goals scored; 5) Play-off.

===== Results summary =====
Overall								Home						Away					
Pld	W	D	L	GF	GA	GD	Pts	W	D	L	GF	GA	GD	W	D	L	GF	GA	GD
5	1	2	2	6	7	−1	5	1	1	0	3	2	+1	0	1	2	3	5	−2

Source: Worldfootball

===== Results by round =====
Round	23	24	25	26	27
Ground	A	H	H	A	A
Result	D	D	W	L	L
Position	10	10	9	9	9
Points	23	24	27	27	27

Source: Worldfootball
A = Away; H = Home; W = Win; D = Draw; L = Loss

===== Matches =====
13 June 2020 23	Senica	1–1	Sereď	Senica
17:00 CEST (UTC+2)	Moses 45'	Report	Vuk 14'	Stadium: OMS ARENA Senica; Attendance: 340; Referee: Jozef Pavlík; Assistant referees: Radoslav Bobko, Adam Jekkel

21 June 2020 24	Sereď	2–2	Pohronie	Zlaté Moravce
17:00 CEST (UTC+2)	Iván (yellow card) 18'; Pankarićan 59'; Duranski (yellow card) 78'; Mečiar 83', (red card) 90'	Report	Weir 10'; Pavlík 15'; Hatok (yellow card) 31'; Mazan (yellow card) 90'	Stadium: Štadión FC ViOn; Attendance: 347; Referee: Michal Smolák; Assistant referees: Miroslav Benko, Martin Vitko

27 June 2020 25	Sereď	1–0	Nitra	Zlaté Moravce
17:00 CEST (UTC+2)	Iván (yellow card) 32'; Špehar 47'	Report		Stadium: Štadión FC ViOn; Attendance: 298; Referee: Peter Kráľovič; Assistant referees: Erik Weiss, Peter Kováč

4 July 2020 26	Trenčín	3–2	Sereď	Žilina
18:00 CEST (UTC+2)	Kadák 11'; Čataković 38'; Šulek (yellow card) 64'; Corryn 72'; Križan (yellow card) 74'	Report	Špehar 28'; Vuk 37'	Stadium: Štadión pod Dubňom; Attendance: 147; Referee: Kristián Micheľ; Assistant referees: Gabriel Ádám, Andrej Hrmo

11 July 2020 27	Zlaté Moravce	1–0	Sereď	Zlaté Moravce
18:00 CEST (UTC+2)	Mészáros 13'; Grozdanovski (yellow card) 75'; Mihálik (yellow card) 81'; Sloboda (yellow card) 89'	Report	Morong (yellow card) 1'; Rorič (yellow card) 45'; Špehar (yellow card) 75'; Djiby Ba (yellow card) 81'; Mečiar (yellow card) 83'; Dabó (yellow card) 90'	Stadium: Štadión FC ViOn; Attendance: 1,100; Referee: Július Straka; Assistant referees: Gabriel Ádám, Peter Mihalík

=== Slovak Cup ===
14 August 2019 Second round	Zvolen	0–2	Sereď	Ružiná
17:00 CEST (UTC+2)	Antal (yellow card) 88'	Report	Attah Junior (yellow card) 23', (goal) 90'; Olavo 24'; Cléber (yellow card) 53'; Slaninka (yellow card) 90'	Stadium: Futbal Aréna Zvolen; Attendance: 327; Referee: Erik Gemzický; Assistant referees: Dušan Hrčka, Peter Čajka

11 September 2019 Third round	Belá	0–10	Sereď	Belá
16:00 CEST (UTC+2)	Ševčík (penalty missed) 71'	Report	Morong 17'; Ventúra 35', 74'; Špehar 43', 57', 63', 87'; Djiby Ba 45'; Iván 54', 76'	Attendance: 442; Referee: Anton Ihring; Assistant referees: Andrej Hrmo, Jozef Mosor

25 September 2019 Fourth round	Vysoká nad Kysucou	0–4	Sereď	Vysoká nad Kysucou
15:30 CEST (UTC+2)		Report	Adekuoroye (yellow card) 18'; Špehar 24', 40'; Cléber 71'; Louka 72'; Metalsi (yellow card) 87'	Attendance: 450; Referee: Marián Ruc; Assistant referees: Rastislav Žákech, Tomáš Straka

30 October 2019 Round of 16	Sereď	3–0	Petržalka	Sereď
13:30 CET (UTC+1)	Hučko 38'; Rorič 67'; Iván 69', (yellow card) 81'	Report		Stadium: Štadión Sereď; Attendance: 280; Referee: Bystrík Nemček; Assistant referees: Marek Galo, Peter Čajka; Fourth official: Anton Ihring

4 March 2020 Quarter-finals	Sereď	0–2	Ružomberok	Zlaté Moravce
14:30 CET (UTC+1)	Pankarićan (yellow card) 1'; Hučko (yellow card) 10'; Duranski (yellow card) 53'; Michalík (yellow card) 68'	Report	Kojnok (yellow card) 8'; Twardzik 11'; Maslo (yellow card) 19'; Regáli 24'; Bobček (yellow card) 36'	Stadium: Štadión FC ViOn; Attendance: 220; Referee: Peter Ziemba; Assistant referees: Miroslav Benko, Anton Perát; Fourth official: Martin Dohál
