= List of Slovak football transfers winter 2019–20 =

Notable Slovak football transfers in the winter transfer window 2019–20 by club. Only transfers of the Fortuna Liga and 2. liga are included.

== Fortuna Liga ==
=== ŠK Slovan Bratislava ===
In: Note: Flags indicate national team as defined under FIFA eligibility rules; some limited exceptions apply. Players may hold more than one non-FIFA nationality.

No.	Pos.	Nation	Player
—	FW	SVK	David Hrnčár (loan return from (Slovakia) Pohronie)
—	DF	SVK	Adam Laczkó (loan return from (Slovakia) Trenčín)
55	FW	SLO	Žan Medved (from (Slovenia) Olimpija Ljubljana)
12	FW	SLO	Alen Ožbolt (from (Bulgaria) Lokomotiv Plovdiv)
36	DF	BRA	Lucas Lovat (from (Slovakia) Spartak Trnava)
4	MF	BIH	Alen Mustafić (on loan from (Bosnia and Herzegovina) Sarajevo)
9	FW	NGR	Ezekiel Henty (from (Hungary) Puskás Akadémia)
TBA	MF	SVK	Vladimír Weiss jr. (from Free agent)

Out: Note: Flags indicate national team as defined under FIFA eligibility rules; some limited exceptions apply. Players may hold more than one non-FIFA nationality.

No.	Pos.	Nation	Player
—	DF	HUN	Richárd Guzmics (to (Hungary) Mezőkövesd)
—	FW	SVK	David Hrnčár (on loan to (Slovakia) Zlaté Moravce)
—	FW	SLO	Andraž Šporar (to (Portugal) Sporting CP)
—	MF	SVK	Denis Potoma (on loan to (Slovakia) Sereď)
—	DF	UKR	Artem Sukhotskyi (on loan to (Belarus) Dinamo Minsk)

=== MŠK Žilina ===
In: Note: Flags indicate national team as defined under FIFA eligibility rules; some limited exceptions apply. Players may hold more than one non-FIFA nationality.

No.	Pos.	Nation	Player
90	FW	POL	Dawid Kurminowski (from (Poland) Lech Poznań)
—	FW	SVK	Adrián Kaprálik (from MŠK Žilina youth)
—	FW	SVK	Patrik Iľko (from MŠK Žilina youth)
—	MF	SVK	Miroslav Gono (from MŠK Žilina youth)

Out: Note: Flags indicate national team as defined under FIFA eligibility rules; some limited exceptions apply. Players may hold more than one non-FIFA nationality.

No.	Pos.	Nation	Player
—	DF	GEO	Luka Lochoshvili (loan return to (Ukraine) Dynamo Kyiv)
—	FW	SVK	Róbert Boženík (to (Netherlands) Feyenoord)
—	FW	SVK	Roland Gerebenits (on loan to (Slovakia) Pohronie)
—	DF	SVK	Peter Chríbik (on loan to (Slovakia) Pohronie)
—	MF	ARG	Iván Díaz (on loan to (Czech Republic) Viktoria Plzeň)
3	DF	SVK	Martin Králik (Released and joined (Czech Republic) České Budějovice)
8	MF	SVK	Lukáš Jánošík (Released and joined (Czech Republic) České Budějovice)
12	MF	SVK	Viktor Pečovský (Released - End of career)
10	FW	SVK	Filip Balaj (Released)
24	DF	SVK	Michal Tomič (Released and joined (Czech Republic) 1. FC Slovácko)
25	DF	CZE	Filip Kaša (Released and joined (Czech Republic) FC Viktoria Plzeň)
30	GK	SVK	Dominik Holec (Released and joined (Czech Republic) AC Sparta Prague)
66	MF	SVK	Miroslav Káčer (Released and joined (Czech Republic) FC Viktoria Plzeň)
20	DF	ALB	Besir Demiri (Released)

=== FC DAC 1904 Dunajská Streda ===
In: Note: Flags indicate national team as defined under FIFA eligibility rules; some limited exceptions apply. Players may hold more than one non-FIFA nationality.

No.	Pos.	Nation	Player
—	FW	SVK	Ladislav Almási (loan return from (Slovakia) Petržalka)
—	FW	UKR	Stanislav Bilenkyi (loan return from (Poland) Zagłębie Sosnowiec)
44	MF	HUN	András Schäfer (on loan from (Italy) Genoa)
5	DF	SRB	Dušan Lalatović (from (Serbia) Radnički Zrenjanin)
21	MF	SVK	Andrej Fábry (from (Czech Republic) Jablonec)
17	DF	CRO	Lorenco Šimić (on loan from (Italy) Sampdoria)
—	MF	CRO	Andrija Balić (on loan from (Italy) Udinese Calcio)
18	FW	HUN	Krisztián Németh (from (United States) Sporting Kansas City)

Out: Note: Flags indicate national team as defined under FIFA eligibility rules; some limited exceptions apply. Players may hold more than one non-FIFA nationality.

No.	Pos.	Nation	Player
—	DF	SVK	Kristián Koštrna (on loan to (Romania) Dinamo București)
—	DF	IRL	Connor Ronan (loan return to (England) Wolverhampton Wanderers)
—	FW	SVK	Ladislav Almási (to (Slovakia) Ružomberok)
—	FW	UKR	Stanislav Bilenkyi (on loan to (Ukraine) Rukh Lviv)
—	DF	SVK	Matej Oravec (to (United States) Philadelphia Union)
—	FW	NGR	Abdulrahman Taiwo (on loan to (Czech Republic) Karviná)
—	MF	HUN	Kristopher Vida (to (Poland) Piast Gliwice)

=== MFK Ružomberok ===
In: Note: Flags indicate national team as defined under FIFA eligibility rules; some limited exceptions apply. Players may hold more than one non-FIFA nationality.

No.	Pos.	Nation	Player
99	FW	SVK	Ladislav Almási (from (Slovakia) DAC Dunajská Streda)
—	FW	SVK	Marek Bobček (loan return from (Slovakia) Tatran Liptovský Mikuláš)

Out: Note: Flags indicate national team as defined under FIFA eligibility rules; some limited exceptions apply. Players may hold more than one non-FIFA nationality.

No.	Pos.	Nation	Player
—	MF	SVK	Peter Ďungel (loan return to (Poland) Stal Mielec)
—	MF	ALB	Kristi Qose (to (Czech Republic) Karviná)
—	FW	SVK	Marek Bobček (on loan to FC Petržalka)

=== MFK Zemplín Michalovce ===
In: Note: Flags indicate national team as defined under FIFA eligibility rules; some limited exceptions apply. Players may hold more than one non-FIFA nationality.

No.	Pos.	Nation	Player
—	DF	SVK	Šimon Kozák (on loan from (England) Southampton U23s)
28	MF	GRE	Georgios Neofytidis (from (Greece) Olympiacos)
45	FW	UKR	Maksym Hirnyi (from (Ukraine) Karpaty Lviv Youth)
4	DF	GRE	Dimitris Konstantinidis (from (Greece) Aris)
—	DF	ESP	Alejandro Méndez García (from (Spain) CD Alcoyano)

Out: Note: Flags indicate national team as defined under FIFA eligibility rules; some limited exceptions apply. Players may hold more than one non-FIFA nationality.

No.	Pos.	Nation	Player
—	DF	TUR	Emre Bekir (loan return to (Turkey) Alanyaspor)
—	DF	UKR	Vadym Chervak (loan return to (Czech Republic) Sparta Prague)
—	MF	SLO	Til Mavretić (released)
—	MF	ESP	Pedrito (to (Czech Republic) Zlín)
—	DF	GRE	Lazaros Rota (to (Netherlands) Fortuna Sittard)

=== FC Spartak Trnava ===
In: Note: Flags indicate national team as defined under FIFA eligibility rules; some limited exceptions apply. Players may hold more than one non-FIFA nationality.

No.	Pos.	Nation	Player
18	FW	SVK	Štefan Molnár (from (Slovakia) Vlčany)
99	FW	MNE	Petar Orlandić (from (Thailand) Sukhothai)
7	MF	SWE	Dijan Vukojević (from (Sweden) Norrby IF)
6	DF	NGR	Izuchuckwu Anthony (from (Norway) Nest-Sotra)
5	DF	SVK	Jakub Krč (from (Slovakia) Senica)
26	DF	SWE	Malkolm Moënza (from (Sweden) Dalkurd FF)
21	FW	CIV	Yann Michael Yao (from (Estonia) Paide Linnameeskond)
1	GK	SVK	Ľuboš Kamenár (from (Slovakia) Petržalka)
72	DF	POR	Joel Pereira (on loan from (Cyprus) Omonia Nicosia)
23	MF	GRE	Theofanis Tzandaris (from (Greece) Panathinaikos)

Out: Note: Flags indicate national team as defined under FIFA eligibility rules; some limited exceptions apply. Players may hold more than one non-FIFA nationality.

No.	Pos.	Nation	Player
—	DF	SRB	Marko Marinković (released and joined (Bosnia and Herzegovina) FK Sloboda Tuzla)
—	GK	SVK	Peter Urminský (end of contract and joined (Scotland) St Mirren)
—	MF	BIH	Emir Halilović (to (Turkey) Boluspor)
—	MF	SVK	Kristián Mihálek (on loan to (Slovakia) Pohronie)
—	FW	AUT	Kubilay Yilmaz (end of contract and joined (Turkey) Yeni Malatyaspor)
—	DF	POR	João Diogo (released and joined (Portugal) Estoril)
—	GK	CZE	Petr Bolek (to (Czech Republic) Karviná)
—	DF	BRA	Lucas Lovat (to (Slovakia) Slovan Bratislava)
—	FW	SVK	Marko Kelemen (on loan to (Slovakia) Zlaté Moravce)
—	FW	SVK	Filip Oršula (to (Georgia (country)) Dinamo Tbilisi)
—	DF	SVK	Ivan Mesík (to (Denmark) Nordsjælland)
—	FW	CRO	Filip Dangubić (end of contract and joined (Romania) Chindia Târgoviște)
—	FW	CUW	Gino van Kessel (to (Slovakia) Trenčín)
8	MF	SVK	Erik Grendel (End of contract - joined FK Železiarne Podbrezová)
72	DF	POR	Joel Pereira (Released)
3	DF	ROU	Bogdan Mitrea (End of contract)
17	DF	SVK	Jozef Menich (Released)
33	FW	BRA	Rafael Tavares (End of loan)

=== FC ViOn Zlaté Moravce ===
In: Note: Flags indicate national team as defined under FIFA eligibility rules; some limited exceptions apply. Players may hold more than one non-FIFA nationality.

No.	Pos.	Nation	Player
—	FW	SVK	David Hrnčár (on loan from (Slovakia) Slovan Bratislava)
—	FW	SVK	Marko Kelemen (on loan from (Slovakia) Spartak Trnava)
—	MF	SVK	András Mészáros (on loan from (Slovakia) FK Pohronie)
—	FW	MNE	Boris Cmiljanić (on loan from ŠK Slovan Bratislava)

Out: Note: Flags indicate national team as defined under FIFA eligibility rules; some limited exceptions apply. Players may hold more than one non-FIFA nationality.

No.	Pos.	Nation	Player
—	FW	BIH	Senad Jarović (loan return to (Denmark) SønderjyskE and joined ŠKF Sereď)
—	MF	GHA	Shaka Mawuli (loan return to (Italy) SPAL)
—	DF	BRA	Jacy (loan return to (Brazil) Capivariano)
—	FW	BRA	Silvio (end of contract and joined (Albania) Vllaznia)
—	FW	BRA	Murilo (Released)

=== AS Trenčín ===
In: Note: Flags indicate national team as defined under FIFA eligibility rules; some limited exceptions apply. Players may hold more than one non-FIFA nationality.

No.	Pos.	Nation	Player
—	MF	SVK	Dávid Machara (loan return from (Slovakia) Púchov)
15	FW	NGR	Abubakar Ghali (on loan from (Nigeria) MFM)
55	GK	NED	Menno Bergsen (from (Netherlands) Eindhoven)
5	DF	FRA	Steve Kapuadi (from (Slovakia) Inter Bratislava)
9	FW	CUW	Gino van Kessel (from (Slovakia) Trnava)
—	DF	CPV	Erik Nielson (from TBA)
—	MF	CPV	Paulo Junior (from TBA)
—	FW	SVK	Lukáš Letenay (from AS Trenčín youth)

Out: Note: Flags indicate national team as defined under FIFA eligibility rules; some limited exceptions apply. Players may hold more than one non-FIFA nationality.

No.	Pos.	Nation	Player
—	DF	SVK	Adam Laczkó (loan return to (Slovakia) Slovan Bratislava)
—	DF	SVK	Peter Kleščík (to (Czech Republic) Příbram)
—	DF	ESP	John Neeskens (end of contract and joined (Spain) Formentera)
—	DF	SVK	Lukáš Skovajsa (to (Romania) Dinamo București)
—	DF	SRB	Jovan Pavlović (on loan to (Slovenia) NK Rudar Velenje)
—	MF	BEL	Lenny Buyl (Released)

=== FK Senica ===
In: Note: Flags indicate national team as defined under FIFA eligibility rules; some limited exceptions apply. Players may hold more than one non-FIFA nationality.

No.	Pos.	Nation	Player
—	MF	SVK	Kristián Lukáčik (on loan from ŠKF Sereď)

Out: Note: Flags indicate national team as defined under FIFA eligibility rules; some limited exceptions apply. Players may hold more than one non-FIFA nationality.

No.	Pos.	Nation	Player
—	FW	COL	Frank Castañeda (to (Moldova) Sheriff Tiraspol)
—	MF	FRA	Sofian El Moudane (to (Morocco) IR Tanger)
—	MF	BRA	Madison (loan return to (Brazil) Goiás)
—	DF	SVK	Tomáš Košút (to (Spain) San Sebastián de los Reyes)
—	FW	GHA	Kwaku Bonsu Osei (to (Venezuela) Caracas)
—	MF	VEN	Luís Ramírez (loan return to (Venezuela) Estudiantes de Caracas)
—	MF	CRO	Lovro Cvek (to (Ukraine) Zorya Luhansk)
—	DF	SVK	Jakub Krč (to (Slovakia) Spartak Trnava)
—	MF	CRO	Mihovil Klapan (to (Bulgaria) Lokomotiv Plovdiv)
—	MF	COL	Julian Caro Sepúlveda (to (Colombia) Envigado)

=== ŠKF Sereď ===
In: Note: Flags indicate national team as defined under FIFA eligibility rules; some limited exceptions apply. Players may hold more than one non-FIFA nationality.

No.	Pos.	Nation	Player
6	DF	SVK	Ľubomír Michalík (from (Slovakia) Slovan Galanta)
—	FW	BIH	Senad Jarović (from (Denmark) SønderjyskE)
—	MF	MKD	Filip Duranski (from (North Macedonia) Sileks)
—	GK	BIH	Adnan Kanurić (from (England) Stoke City U23s)
—	MF	CZE	Nicolas Šumský (from (Czech Republic) Frýdek-Místek)
—	FW	CRO	Matej Vuk (on loan from (Croatia) Rijeka)
—	MF	SVK	Denis Potoma (on loan from (Slovakia) Slovan Bratislava)
—	FW	AUT	Aleksandar Vucenovic (from (Austria) SKN St. Pölten)

Out: Note: Flags indicate national team as defined under FIFA eligibility rules; some limited exceptions apply. Players may hold more than one non-FIFA nationality.

No.	Pos.	Nation	Player
—	GK	MKD	Dejan Iliev (loan return to (England) Arsenal)
—	FW	SVK	Ľubomír Ulrich (to Spartak Myjava)
—	MF	SVK	Denis Ventúra (end of contract and joined (Romania) Academica Clinceni)
—	MF	BRA	Matheus Olavo (loan return to (Brazil) Londrina)
—	DF	BIH	Abdel Metalsi (released)
—	DF	BRA	Bruno Rapanelli (loan return to (Brazil) São Paulo)
—	DF	SRB	Nikola Unković (on loan to (Slovakia) Šamorín)
—	FW	CRO	Roko Jureškin (on loan to MŠK Žilina II)

=== FC Nitra ===
In: Note: Flags indicate national team as defined under FIFA eligibility rules; some limited exceptions apply. Players may hold more than one non-FIFA nationality.

No.	Pos.	Nation	Player
—	MF	CRO	Duje Javorčić (from (France) Amiens SC)
—	FW	CRO	Ante Kuliš (from (Croatia) NK Dugopolje)
—	DF	UGA	Isaac Muleme (on loan from (Czech Republic) Žižkov)
—	DF	BRA	Silva (on loan from (Brazil) Grêmio Novorizontino)
—	DF	BRA	Jesus (on loan from (Brazil) Grêmio Novorizontino)
—	DF	UKR	Dmytro Nyemchaninov (from (Ukraine) FC Rukh Lviv)

Out: Note: Flags indicate national team as defined under FIFA eligibility rules; some limited exceptions apply. Players may hold more than one non-FIFA nationality.

No.	Pos.	Nation	Player
—	FW	SVK	Marek Fábry (to (Czech Republic) Dukla Prague)
—	DF	SVK	Miloš Šimončič (retired)
—	FW	SVK	Matúš Mikuš (Released)
—	MF	SVK	Frederik Bilovský (Released)
—	DF	SVK	Marek Dubeň (Released)
23	GK	SVK	Martin Kuciak (Released)
26	DF	SVK	Pavol Farkaš (Released)

=== FK Pohronie ===
In: Note: Flags indicate national team as defined under FIFA eligibility rules; some limited exceptions apply. Players may hold more than one non-FIFA nationality.

No.	Pos.	Nation	Player
—	DF	SVK	Mário Jacko (loan return from (Slovakia) Odeva Lipany)
8	MF	SVK	Kristián Mihálek (on loan from (Slovakia) Spartak Trnava)
5	DF	CZE	Petr Pavlík (on loan from (Czech Republic) Zbrojovka Brno)
10	FW	BIH	Ismar Tandir (on loan from (Czech Republic) Sigma Olomouc)
33	DF	BRA	Jacy (on loan from (Brazil) Capivariano)
20	MF	SVK	Michal Obročník (from (Poland) Chojniczanka Chojnice)
11	FW	BIH	Kojo Matić (from (Slovakia) Gabčíkovo)
9	FW	SVK	Roland Gerebenits (on loan from (Slovakia) MŠK Žilina II)
21	DF	SVK	Peter Chríbik (on loan from (Slovakia) MŠK Žilina II)
25	GK	CZE	Matěj Luksch (on loan from (Czech Republic) Dynamo České Budějovice)
16	FW	SVK	Matúš Mikuš (free agent, last played for (Slovakia) Nitra)

Out: Note: Flags indicate national team as defined under FIFA eligibility rules; some limited exceptions apply. Players may hold more than one non-FIFA nationality.

No.	Pos.	Nation	Player
—	DF	SVK	Marek Bartoš (loan return to (Slovakia) Podbrezová)
—	FW	SVK	David Hrnčár (loan return to (Slovakia) Slovan Bratislava)
—	GK	SVK	Martin Vantruba (loan return to (Czech Republic) Slavia Prague)
—	MF	SVK	Michal Klec (to (Poland) Puszcza Niepołomice)
—	FW	SVK	Dávid Kondrlík (loaned to (Austria) Bruck/Leitha)
—	MF	SVK	Jakub Sedláček (released and joined (Hungary) Újpest)
—	DF	SVK	Ján Sojka (to (Slovakia) Rakytovce)
—	DF	SVK	Lukáš Tesák (Retired)
—	FW	POL	Mateusz Zachara (released and joined (Slovakia) Podbrezová)
—	DF	SVK	Ján Nosko (to (Slovakia) Banská Bystrica)
—	MF	SVK	András Mészáros (loaned to (Slovakia) ViOn Zlaté Moravce)
—	GK	SVK	Roman Packo (Retired)
—	DF	SVK	Mário Jacko (Retired)

== 2. liga ==
=== MFK Dukla Banská Bystrica ===
In: Note: Flags indicate national team as defined under FIFA eligibility rules; some limited exceptions apply. Players may hold more than one non-FIFA nationality.

No.	Pos.	Nation	Player
—	DF	SVK	Ján Nosko (from (Slovakia) Pohronie)
—	FW	MNE	Miladin Vujošević (from (Slovakia) Dubnica)
—	MF	SVK	Peter Bača (loan return from FK Rakytovce)

Out: Note: Flags indicate national team as defined under FIFA eligibility rules; some limited exceptions apply. Players may hold more than one non-FIFA nationality.

No.	Pos.	Nation	Player

=== FK Dubnica ===
In: Note: Flags indicate national team as defined under FIFA eligibility rules; some limited exceptions apply. Players may hold more than one non-FIFA nationality.

No.	Pos.	Nation	Player
—	MF	SVK	Frederik Bilovský (on loan from FC Nitra)
—	MF	SVK	Matej Jakúbek (on loan from FC Spartak Trnava)
—	DF	SVK	Slavomír Pagáč (on loan from KFC Komárno)

Out: Note: Flags indicate national team as defined under FIFA eligibility rules; some limited exceptions apply. Players may hold more than one non-FIFA nationality.

No.	Pos.	Nation	Player
—	FW	MNE	Miladin Vujošević (to (Slovakia) Dukla Banská Bystrica)

=== MFK Skalica ===
In: Note: Flags indicate national team as defined under FIFA eligibility rules; some limited exceptions apply. Players may hold more than one non-FIFA nationality.

No.	Pos.	Nation	Player
—	DF	SVK	Michal Ranko (from free agent)
—	FW	SVK	Jakub Šulc (from FK Železiarne Podbrezová)
—	DF	CZE	Jakub Hric (from FK Železiarne Podbrezová)
—	DF	SVK	Ján Mizerák (on loan from FK Železiarne Podbrezová)

Out: Note: Flags indicate national team as defined under FIFA eligibility rules; some limited exceptions apply. Players may hold more than one non-FIFA nationality.

No.	Pos.	Nation	Player
—	MF	SVK	Karol Karlík (released)
—	MF	SVK	Filip Tomovič (released)

=== FK Poprad ===
In: Note: Flags indicate national team as defined under FIFA eligibility rules; some limited exceptions apply. Players may hold more than one non-FIFA nationality.

No.	Pos.	Nation	Player
—	MF	NGR	Wisdom Kanu (from (Slovakia) Vranov nad Topľou)
—	MF	ESP	Óscar (from (Spain) Llagostera)
—	GK	SVK	Samuel Vavrúš (on loan from AFC Nové Mesto nad Váhom)

Out: Note: Flags indicate national team as defined under FIFA eligibility rules; some limited exceptions apply. Players may hold more than one non-FIFA nationality.

No.	Pos.	Nation	Player
—	MF	SVK	Štefan Zošák (Retired)
—	DF	CZE	Adam Pajer (to (Slovakia) Podbrezová)
—	MF	SVK	Denis Jančo (to (Slovakia) Šamorín)

=== MŠK Žilina B ===
In: Note: Flags indicate national team as defined under FIFA eligibility rules; some limited exceptions apply. Players may hold more than one non-FIFA nationality.

No.	Pos.	Nation	Player
—	FW	CRO	Roko Jureškin (on loan from ŠKF Sereď)
—	MF	SVK	Viktor Pečovský (from MŠK Žilina)

Out: Note: Flags indicate national team as defined under FIFA eligibility rules; some limited exceptions apply. Players may hold more than one non-FIFA nationality.

No.	Pos.	Nation	Player
—	DF	SVK	Peter Chríbik (on loan to FK Pohronie)
—	DF	SVK	Bernard Petrák (on loan to FK Železiarne Podbrezová)
—	DF	SVK	Branislav Šušolík (on loan to MŠK Púchov)
—	FW	SVK	Roland Gerebenits (on loan to FK Pohronie)

=== MFK Tatran Liptovský Mikuláš ===
In: Note: Flags indicate national team as defined under FIFA eligibility rules; some limited exceptions apply. Players may hold more than one non-FIFA nationality.

No.	Pos.	Nation	Player
—	FW	SVK	Peter Voško (on loan from (Slovakia) Podbrezová)
—	MF	KOR	Seong-ju Oh (from (South Korea) Konkuk University)
—		KOR	Chan Soo Kim (from (South Korea) Yong In University)
—		KOR	Chan Young Ha (from (South Korea) Osan Middle High School)

Out: Note: Flags indicate national team as defined under FIFA eligibility rules; some limited exceptions apply. Players may hold more than one non-FIFA nationality.

No.	Pos.	Nation	Player
—	FW	SVK	Marko Lukáč (end of contract)
—	FW	SVK	Marek Bobček (loan return to (Slovakia) Ružomberok II)
—	DF	SVK	Richard Nemergut (to TBA)

=== MFK Ružomberok B ===
In: Note: Flags indicate national team as defined under FIFA eligibility rules; some limited exceptions apply. Players may hold more than one non-FIFA nationality.

No.	Pos.	Nation	Player

Out: Note: Flags indicate national team as defined under FIFA eligibility rules; some limited exceptions apply. Players may hold more than one non-FIFA nationality.

No.	Pos.	Nation	Player
—	FW	SVK	Marek Bobček (on loan to FC Petržalka)

=== FK Železiarne Podbrezová ===
In: Note: Flags indicate national team as defined under FIFA eligibility rules; some limited exceptions apply. Players may hold more than one non-FIFA nationality.

No.	Pos.	Nation	Player
—	DF	SVK	Marek Bartoš (loan return from (Slovakia) Pohronie)
—	FW	SVK	Daniel Pavúk (loan return from (Slovakia) Tatran Prešov)
—	FW	SVK	Peter Voško (loan return from (Slovakia) Partizán Bardejov)
—	MF	SVK	Patrik Krčula (from (Slovakia) Púchov)
—	DF	CZE	Adam Pajer (from (Slovakia) Poprad)
—	FW	POL	Mateusz Zachara (from (Slovakia) Pohronie)
—	MF	SVK	Filip Szetei (on loan from (Slovakia) Slovan Bratislava Youth)
—	DF	GHA	Ishmael Baidoo (from (Poland) Górnik Zabrze)
—	DF	SVK	Bernard Petrák (on loan from MŠK Žilina II)
—	MF	SVK	Erik Grendel (from FC Spartak Trnava)

Out: Note: Flags indicate national team as defined under FIFA eligibility rules; some limited exceptions apply. Players may hold more than one non-FIFA nationality.

No.	Pos.	Nation	Player
—	MF	SVK	Miroslav Viazanko (retired)
—	DF	SVK	Juraj Chvátal (loan return to (Czech Republic) Sigma Olomouc)
—	DF	CZE	Jakub Hric (end of contract)
—	FW	SVK	Matúš Marcin (to (Poland) Elana Toruń)
—	FW	SVK	Jakub Šulc (to (Slovakia) Skalica)
—	FW	SVK	Peter Voško (on loan to (Slovakia) Tatran Liptovský Mikuláš)
—	DF	SVK	Ján Mizerák (on loan to MFK Skalica)
—	MF	SVK	Viktor Mojžiš (to TBA)
—	DF	SVK	Matúš Mader (to Spartak Trnava juniori)
—	MF	SVK	Nicolas Mejri (to TBA)

=== FC Košice ===
In: Note: Flags indicate national team as defined under FIFA eligibility rules; some limited exceptions apply. Players may hold more than one non-FIFA nationality.

No.	Pos.	Nation	Player
—	MF	SVK	Dávid Keresteš (from (Slovakia) Partizán Bardejov)
—	FW	ENG	Samuel Ford (from (Australia) Port Melbourne)
—	MF	COL	Robinson Blandón (from (Costa Rica) Liberia)
—	MF	SVK	Marcel Novák (on loan from (Slovakia) Michalovce Youth)

Out: Note: Flags indicate national team as defined under FIFA eligibility rules; some limited exceptions apply. Players may hold more than one non-FIFA nationality.

No.	Pos.	Nation	Player
—	MF	ESP	Mikel Albisu (End of contract)
—	DF	SVK	Sergej Pilipčuk (end of contract and joined (Slovakia) Mladosť Kalša)
—	DF	SVK	Mikuláš Tóth (end of contract)
—	FW	SRB	Predrag Radovanović (on loan to (Slovakia) Slovan Giraltovce)

=== MŠK Púchov ===
In: Note: Flags indicate national team as defined under FIFA eligibility rules; some limited exceptions apply. Players may hold more than one non-FIFA nationality.

No.	Pos.	Nation	Player
—	DF	SVK	Branislav Šušolík (on loan from MŠK Žilina II)
—	DF	SVK	Michal Petráš (on loan from AS Trenčín)
—	FW	UKR	Oleksandr Voitiuk (on loan from AS Trenčín)
—	FW	NGR	Kingsley Kemakolam Iheme (on loan from FC Slovan Galanta)

Out: Note: Flags indicate national team as defined under FIFA eligibility rules; some limited exceptions apply. Players may hold more than one non-FIFA nationality.

No.	Pos.	Nation	Player
—	MF	SVK	Dávid Machara (loan return to (Slovakia) Trenčín)
—	DF	SVK	Marián Pišoja (loan return to (Slovakia) Trenčín)
—	MF	SVK	Patrik Krčula (to (Slovakia) Podbrezová)
—	MF	SVK	Denis Martinko (to (Austria) Rohrendorf)
—	MF	SVK	Štefan Holiš (to (Czech Republic) Blansko)
—	DF	SVK	Michal Vanák (on loan to (Slovakia) Spartak Kvašov)
—	FW	SVK	Martin Vlček (loan return to FK Inter Bratislava)
—	DF	SVK	František Brezničan (on loan to FK Junior Kanianka)

=== Partizán Bardejov ===
In: Note: Flags indicate national team as defined under FIFA eligibility rules; some limited exceptions apply. Players may hold more than one non-FIFA nationality.

No.	Pos.	Nation	Player
—	FW	BRA	Rômulo (from (Malta) Qormi F.C.)
—		BRA	Joao Victor Guimaraes Silva (from TBA)
—	MF	POR	Bruno Luz (from Free agent)
—	FW	POL	Rafał Zaborowski (from (Romania) ACS Viitorul Târgu Jiu)
—	DF	POL	Paweł Jarzębak (from (Poland) Kolejarz Stróże)
—	FW	SVK	Šimon Stachura (loan return from ŠK Milénium Bardejovská Nová Ves)
—	DF	SVK	Ľubomír Pangrác-Piter (loan return from ŠK Milénium Bardejovská Nová Ves)
—	MF	CUW	Quintón Christina (on loan from FK Inter Bratislava)
—	FW	SVK	Marko Lukáč (from MFK Tatran Liptovský Mikuláš)
—	MF	SVK	Dávid Haščák (on loan from FK Železiarne Podbrezová)

Out: Note: Flags indicate national team as defined under FIFA eligibility rules; some limited exceptions apply. Players may hold more than one non-FIFA nationality.

No.	Pos.	Nation	Player
—	FW	SVK	Peter Voško (loan return to (Slovakia) Podbrezová)
—	MF	SVK	Radoslav Človečko (end of contract)
—	MF	SVK	Adrián Leško (end of contract - joined Trebišov)
—	FW	SRB	Marko Milunović (end of contract)
—	MF	SVK	Róbert Stachura (end of contract)
—	MF	SVK	Dávid Keresteš (to (Slovakia) Košice)
—	DF	BLR	Nikita Rochev (end of contract)
—	MF	SVK	Filip Maník (to (Slovakia) Petržalka)
—	DF	SVK	Oliver Janso (on loan to KFC Komárno)
—	DF	SVK	Jakub Bartek (on loan to TJ ŠM Dulová Ves)
—	MF	SVK	Martin Dupkala (on loan to TJ ŠM Dulová Ves)
—	DF	SVK	Slavomír Kica (on loan to FK Gerlachov)
—	MF	SVK	Peter Katona (on loan to TJ ŠM Dulová Ves)

=== KFC Komárno ===
In: Note: Flags indicate national team as defined under FIFA eligibility rules; some limited exceptions apply. Players may hold more than one non-FIFA nationality.

No.	Pos.	Nation	Player
—	DF	SVK	Marcel Ondruš (loan return from (Slovakia) Petržalka)
—	MF	SVK	Kristóf Domonkos (from (Hungary) Győr)
—	MF	SLO	Kristijan Šipek (from (Slovenia) Dob)
—	DF	SVK	Ladislav Szöcs (from (Slovakia) Petržalka)
—	DF	SVK	Denis Lovász (from (Czech Republic) Karviná Youth)
—	MF	SRB	Goran Matić (from FK Slavoj Trebišov)
—	GK	SRB	Miroslav Grujičić (on loan from MŠK Novohrad Lučenec)
—	DF	SVK	Oliver Janso (on loan from Partizán Bardejov)

Out: Note: Flags indicate national team as defined under FIFA eligibility rules; some limited exceptions apply. Players may hold more than one non-FIFA nationality.

No.	Pos.	Nation	Player
—	GK	HUN	Balázs Ásványi (loan return to (Hungary) Puskás Akadémia)
—	FW	SVK	Dominik Sandal (loan return to (Hungary) Gyirmót)
—	MF	SVK	Dominik Ujlaky (to (Austria) Tadten)
—	DF	SVK	Martin Šimko (to (Czech Republic) Vysočina Jihlava)
—	GK	SVK	Matej Slávik (on loan to (Slovakia) Beluša)
—	DF	SVK	Slavomír Pagáč (on loan to FK Dubnica)
—	DF	SVK	Samuel Antálek (on loan to (Slovakia) TBA)
—	FW	SVK	Erik Mikeš (on loan to (Slovakia) TBA)
—	MF	SVK	Marek Rigo (on loan to Slovan Bratislava II)
—	MF	CZE	Matěj Končal (to TBA)

=== FC ŠTK 1914 Šamorín ===
In: Note: Flags indicate national team as defined under FIFA eligibility rules; some limited exceptions apply. Players may hold more than one non-FIFA nationality.

No.	Pos.	Nation	Player
—	MF	SVK	Denis Jančo (from (Slovakia) Poprad)
—	DF	GRE	Konstantinos Ikonomou (from (Greece) Ergotelis)
—	DF	SRB	Nikola Unković (on loan from (Slovakia) Sereď)
—	MF	BRA	Matheus Gonçalves (on loan from OFK Veľký Ďur)

Out: Note: Flags indicate national team as defined under FIFA eligibility rules; some limited exceptions apply. Players may hold more than one non-FIFA nationality.

No.	Pos.	Nation	Player
—	DF	SVK	Dávid Valek (to (Austria) Rohrendorf)
—	MF	SVK	Tamás Németh (to (Hungary) Kazincbarcika)
—	MF	SVK	János László (on loan to ŠK 1923 Gabčíkovo)
—	FW	SVK	Tamás Magyarics (on loan to ŠK 1923 Gabčíkovo)

=== FC Petržalka ===
In: Note: Flags indicate national team as defined under FIFA eligibility rules; some limited exceptions apply. Players may hold more than one non-FIFA nationality.

No.	Pos.	Nation	Player
—	FW	SVK	František Kubík (from (Czech Republic) Frýdek-Místek)
—	MF	SVK	Filip Maník (from (Slovakia) Partizán Bardejov)
—	GK	SVK	Libor Hrdlička (on loan from (Czech Republic) Karviná)
—	MF	SVK	Lukáš Lupták (free agent)
—	MF	SVK	Aleš Štroncer (from (Slovakia) Odeva Lipany)
—	MF	CZE	Marek Zúbek (from (Czech Republic) FC Spartak Velká Bíteš)
—	FW	SVK	Marek Bobček (on loan from MFK Ružomberok)
—	DF	SVK	Samuel Kozlovský (on loan from Slovan Bratislava II)
—	DF	SVK	Zoltán Kontár (from (Hungary) Gyirmót FC Győr)

Out: Note: Flags indicate national team as defined under FIFA eligibility rules; some limited exceptions apply. Players may hold more than one non-FIFA nationality.

No.	Pos.	Nation	Player
—	GK	SVK	Pavol Lastovica (loan return to (Slovakia) Tatran Krásno nad Kysucou)
—	DF	SVK	Marcel Ondruš (loan return to (Slovakia) Komárno)
—	MF	CUW	Quintón Christina (released)
—	FW	SVK	Nicolas Pochylý (released)
—	FW	SVK	Ladislav Almási (loan return to (Slovakia) DAC Dunajská Streda)
—	MF	SVK	Marcel Oravec (to (Slovakia) Šaľa)
—	GK	SVK	Ľuboš Kamenár (to (Slovakia) Spartak Trnava)
—	DF	SVK	Ladislav Szöcs (to (Slovakia) Komárno)
—	DF	SVK	Šimon Kupec (to (Austria) Stadlau)
—	MF	SVK	Jakub Kosorin (to (Czech Republic) FK Hodonín)

=== ŠK Slovan Bratislava B ===
In: Note: Flags indicate national team as defined under FIFA eligibility rules; some limited exceptions apply. Players may hold more than one non-FIFA nationality.

No.	Pos.	Nation	Player
—	DF	SVK	Adam Laczkó (loan return from AS Trenčín)
—	MF	SVK	Marek Rigo (on loan from KFC Komárno)

Out: Note: Flags indicate national team as defined under FIFA eligibility rules; some limited exceptions apply. Players may hold more than one non-FIFA nationality.

No.	Pos.	Nation	Player
—	DF	SVK	Samuel Kozlovský (on loan to FC Petržalka)
—	MF	SVK	Denis Potoma (on loan to ŠKF Sereď)

=== FK Slavoj Trebišov ===
In: Note: Flags indicate national team as defined under FIFA eligibility rules; some limited exceptions apply. Players may hold more than one non-FIFA nationality.

No.	Pos.	Nation	Player
—	FW	NGR	Issa Adekunle (from free agent)
—	DF	NGR	Celestine Lazarus (from free agent)
—	DF	SVK	Peter Vojtovič (from FK Humenné)
—	GK	CZE	Michal Bárta (on loan from (Czech Republic) MFK Frýdek-Místek)
—	FW	SVK	Adrián Leško (from Partizán Bardejov)
—	FW	UKR	Illia Tereshchenko (from (Ukraine) FC Dinaz Vyshhorod)

Out: Note: Flags indicate national team as defined under FIFA eligibility rules; some limited exceptions apply. Players may hold more than one non-FIFA nationality.

No.	Pos.	Nation	Player
—	FW	SVK	Ján Novák (on loan to (Slovakia) Mladosť Kalša)
—	FW	SVK	Róbert Jano (to (Hungary) Tállya KSE)
—	MF	SRB	Goran Matić (to KFC Komárno)
—	GK	SVK	Martin Leško (on loan to FC Lokomotíva Košice)
