= Ján Sojka =

Slovak footballer

Personal information
- Full name: Ján Sojka
- Date of birth: 7 October 1990 (age 36)
- Place of birth: Banská Bystrica, Czechoslovakia
- Position: Defensive midfielder

Team information
- Current team: Rakytovce
- Number: 17

Youth career
- 2005–2007: FC Junior Radvaň
- 2007–2009: Rakytovce

Senior career*
| Years | Team | Apps | (Gls) |
| –2011 | Rakytovce | ? | (?) |
| 2011 | → Sokol Dolná Ždaňa (loan) | ? | (?) |
| 2012–2019 | Pohronie | 153 | (13) |
| 2020– | RSC Hamšík Academy | 41 | (4) |
- * Club domestic league appearances and goals as of 30 June 2022

Ján Sojka (born 7 October 1990) is a Slovak football midfielder who currently plays for RSC Hamšík Academy in 3. Liga.

== Career ==
Sojka made his Fortuna Liga debut on 20 July 2019, in a sold-out home fixture against defending champions, Slovan Bratislava. Sojka was featured in a starting-XI. After over an hour he was replaced by summer arrival, Michal Klec. While on the pitch, Sojka witnessed two goals of Slovan, scored by Aleksandar Čavrić and Andraž Šporar, from a penalty. Later on Šporar's second goal and a sole goal of Pohronie, scored by Patrik Abrahám, had set the final score to 1:3.

Sojka made another Fortuna Liga appearance on 31 August 2019, in Myjava, in a neutral-soil away fixture against iClinic Sereď. Sojka came on in the 66th minute as a replacement for Jakub Sedláček, with the score set at 2:2, following goals by Zachara and Abrahám for Pohronie and iClinic's goal by Alex Iván and own-goal by Pohronie's defender Ján Nosko. Pohronie went on to go one down after a goal by Tomáš Hučko, but Patrik Jacko had set the score to the final 3:3 in the stoppage time. This was Sojka's last appearance for Pohronie.

Sojka was one of Pohronie's founding players, joining the newly formed club in 2012. During the 8 seasons with the club he collected over 150 league starts across three top divisions of Slovak league system, scoring over a dozen of goals. He was there with both promotions of the club to 2. Liga and the Fortuna Liga.

== Honours ==
Pohronie

- 2. Liga: 2018–19
- 3. Liga: 2012–13
