= Panagiotis Louka =

Cypriot footballer (born 2000)

Personal information
- Date of birth: 8 September 2000 (age 26)
- Place of birth: Nicosia, Cyprus
- Height: 1.91 m (6 ft 3 in)
- Position: Forward

Team information
- Current team: Nea Salamina Famagusta FC
- Number: 89

Youth career
- APOEL
- –2016: AEK Larnaca
- 2016–2019: Atalanta
- 2018–2019: → Palermo (loan)

Senior career*
Years	Team	Apps	(Gls)
2019–2020	Atalanta	0	(0)
2019–2020	→ Sered (loan)	12	(0)
2020–2021	Tsarsko Selo	22	(1)
2021	GSD Ambrosiana		
2022	Achyronas Liopetriou	16	(5)
2022–2024	AEL Limassol	0	(0)
2022–2023	→ Ypsonas (loan)	24	(11)
2023–2024	→ Akritas Chlorakas (loan)	15	(4)
2024–25	AEZ Zakakiou	3	(3)
2025-	Nea Salamina Famagusta FC	28	(2)

International career
2015–2017	Cyprus U17	13	(4)
2017–2019	Cyprus U19	16	(5)
- * Club domestic league appearances and goals as of 20 September 2026

Panagiotis Louka (Greek: Παναγιώτης Λουκά; born 8 September 2000) is a Cypriot footballer who plays as a forward for Nea Salamina Famagusta FC.

== Club career ==
=== Atalanta ===
==== Loan to iClinic Sereď ====
He joined ŠKF Sereď on loan from Atalanta Bergamo in August 2019.

He made his professional Fortuna liga debut for ŠKF Sereď on 14 September 2019 in a game against Ružomberok. He substituted Maj Rorič in the 68th minute.
