= Adekuoroye =

Adékúoróyè
- Gender: Male
- Language: Yoruba

Origin
- Origin: Nigerian
- Meaning: The crown is commended for his/her suffering to attain the honour.
- Region of origin: South West, Nigeria

Adékúoróyè is a Nigerian surname. It is a male name of Yoruba origin, which means "The crown is commended for his/her suffering to attain the honour.". It is a name that is held in the highest regard and reverence.

== Notable individuals with the name ==
- Bankole Adekuoroye (born 1996), Nigerian footballer
- Odunayo Adekuoroye (born 1993), Nigerian freestyle wrestler
