= Mečiar =

Mečiar is a Slovak surname meaning "sword maker". Notable people with this surname include:

- Martin Mečiar (born 1993), Slovak footballer
- Vladimír Mečiar (1990–1991; 1992–1994; 1994–1998), Prime Minister of Slovakia
