= Martin Sus (footballer, born 1990) =

Czech footballer (born 1990)

Personal information
- Full name: Martin Sus
- Date of birth: 15 March 1990 (age 36)
- Place of birth: Benešov, Czechoslovakia
- Height: 1.78 m (5 ft 10 in)
- Position: Right-back

Team information
- Current team: Říčany
- Number: 4

Youth career
- 1998–2000: Slavia Prague
- 2000–2009: Sparta Prague

Senior career*
Years	Team	Apps	(Gls)
2009–2012	Sparta Prague B	41	(1)
2012–2014	Vlašim	52	(5)
2014	→ Příbram (loan)	16	(1)
2015–2016	Slovan Liberec	13	(0)
2015–2016	→ Příbram (loan)	17	(0)
2016–2018	Baník Ostrava	39	(6)
2018	→ Mladá Boleslav (loan)	3	(0)
2018–2019	iClinic Sereď	31	(1)
2019–2020	Opava	15	(1)
2020–2021	Stal Mielec	6	(0)
2021–2022	Příbram	13	(0)
2022	→ Říčany (loan)		
2022–	Říčany		

International career
2005–2006	Czech Republic U16	2	(0)
2006–2007	Czech Republic U17	8	(0)
2007–2008	Czech Republic U18	9	(1)
2008–2009	Czech Republic U19	8	(1)
- * Club domestic league appearances and goals as of 15 September 2021

Martin Sus (born 15 March 1990) is a Czech footballer who plays as a right-back for FK Říčany. He has represented his country at youth level.

== Career ==
=== Opava ===
After a year of very successful engagement in Slovakia, Sus returned to Czech Republic and signed a one-year contract with SFC Opava on 3 September 2019.

=== Stal Mielec ===
On 4 September 2020, he joined Ekstraklasa club Stal Mielec.

== Honours ==
Slovan Liberec

- Czech Cup: 2014–15
