= Til Mavretič =

Slovenian footballer (born 1997)

Personal information
- Date of birth: 19 November 1997 (age 28)
- Place of birth: Slovenia
- Height: 1.78 m (5 ft 10 in)
- Position: Midfielder

Team information
- Current team: TransINVEST
- Number: 17

Youth career
- –2016: Bravo

Senior career*
Years	Team	Apps	(Gls)
2016	Bravo	3	(0)
2016–2018	Monopoli 1966	40	(4)
2019	Zemplín Michalovce	10	(0)
2020–2021	Domžale	16	(0)
2021	→ Gorica (loan)	15	(0)
2021–2022	Tabor Sežana	29	(1)
2022–2026	Levadia	90	(5)
2026	Dinamo Samarqand	9	(1)
2026–	TransINVEST	3	(1)
- * Club domestic league appearances and goals as of 15 September 2026

Til Mavretič (born 19 November 1997) is a Slovenian professional footballer who plays as a midfielder for Toplyga club TransINVEST.

== Career ==
=== Zemplín Michalovce ===
Mavretič made his professional Slovak Super Liga debut for Zemplín Michalovce against iClinic Sereď on 4 May 2019. He played the entire duration of the 2–2 tie and was booked in the first half with a yellow card.
