= Filip Pankarićan =

Serbian footballer

Personal information
- Date of birth: 28 March 1993 (age 33)
- Place of birth: Zrenjanin, FR Yugoslavia
- Height: 1.80 m (5 ft 11 in)
- Position: Midfielder

Team information
- Current team: SV 7023 Z-S-P
- Number: 14

Youth career
- Futura Zrenjanin
- Radnički Zrenjanin
- Banat Zrenjanin

Senior career*
Years	Team	Apps	(Gls)
2011–2012	Senta		
2012–2013	Cement Beočin		
2014–2016	ČSK Čelarevo	1	(0)
2016	Slovan Duslo Šaľa	8	(1)
2017	Skalica	12	(1)
2017–2021	Sereď	87	(8)
2021–2022	Gudja United	18	(2)
2023	SK Wullersdorf	14	(2)
2023–	SV 7023 Z-S-P	40	(9)
- * Club domestic league appearances and goals as of 8 March 2025

Filip Pankarićan (Serbian Cyrillic: Филип Панкарићан; born 28 March 1993) is a Serbian football midfielder who currently plays for Austrian lower league side SV 7023 Zemendorf-Stöttera-Pöttelsdorf (SV 7023 Z-S-P).

== Club career ==
Born in Zrenjanin, Filip started his career playing for local club Banat Zrenjanin. Later he played for Senta, Cement Beočin and ČSK Čelarevo. He joined Maltese Premier League club Gudja United in 2021.

=== ŠKF Sereď ===
Pankarićan made his Fortuna Liga debut for ŠKF Sereď against Železiarne Podbrezová on 25 August 2018. He started the match in the starting-XI and was replaced by Rudolf Bilas after about 80 minutes.
