= Roko Jureškin =

Croatian footballer

Personal information
- Date of birth: 29 September 2000 (age 26)
- Place of birth: Split, Croatia
- Height: 1.88 m (6 ft 2 in)
- Position: Left-back

Team information
- Current team: Tenerife
- Number: 3

Youth career
- Hajduk Split
- 2015–2018: NK Adriatic Split
- 2018: Primorac
- 2018–2019: Dugopolje

Senior career*
Years	Team	Apps	(Gls)
2019–2022	Sereď	67	(9)
2020	→ Žilina B (loan)	1	(0)
2022–2024	Pisa	8	(0)
2023	→ Benevento (loan)	5	(0)
2024	→ Spezia (loan)	0	(0)
2024	Sheriff Tiraspol	4	(0)
2024–2026	Spartak Trnava	39	(2)
2026–	Tenerife	0	(0)

International career
2022	Croatia U20	3	(0)
2022–2023	Croatia U21	3	(1)
- * Club domestic league appearances and goals as of 16 May 2026

Roko Jureškin (born 29 September 2000) is a Croatian footballer who plays as a left-back for Segunda División club Tenerife.

== Club career ==
=== Sereď ===
Jureškin made his Fortuna Liga debut for iClinic Sereď against Spartak Trnava during an away fixture on 21 July 2019. Jureškin was fielded during the half time as a replacement for Aldo Baéz. He was also booked late in the second half with a yellow card.

In his fourth start, during a match against Nitra at pod Zoborom, Jureškin recorded his first goal for iClinic. After over an hour of play, Jureškin had replaced Cléber, as Nitra was in a 2–0 lead. While on the pitch, Jureškin had witnessed a goal per side - first Nitra had increased the lead through Milan Ristovski and then Dino Špehar had narrowed the gap. In the 78th minute, after a pass by Alex Iván, Jureškin had brought Sereď to a one-goal difference, but the red-whites had failed to equalise and lost the game 2–3.

Despite five consecutive appearances at the start of the season Jureškin had lost his place in the squad in late August, making a single league appearance since (against AS Trenčín on 28 September 2019) and missing 13 other games.

=== Loan at Žilina ===
During the winter of 2020, Jureškin had left for MŠK Žilina B, competing in 2. Liga. He had made an impression during a friendly against Sigma Olomouc, scoring both goals of the match.

He made his league debut for Žilina in the first spring fixture against Petržalka. He appeared as a second half tactical replacement for Vahan Bichakhchyan, as Žilina held a 1–0 lead. Žilina went on to hold onto the three points. In the following week, however, the season was postponed due to the COVID-19 pandemic.

=== Pisa ===
On 10 July 2022, Jureškin signed a three-year contract with Pisa in Italian second-tier Serie B. On 31 January 2023, he moved on loan to Benevento in the same league, with an option to buy.

On 31 January 2024, he joined Spezia on loan for the remainder of the season with the option to buy.

=== Sheriff Tiraspol ===
On 19 July 2024, Jureškin joined Moldovan Super Liga club Sheriff Tiraspol.

=== Spartak Trnava ===
On 13 September 2024, Spartak Trnava announced the signing of Jureškin as a free-agent, on a contract until June 2026. He made his league debut for the club in a 1–1 draw against FC Košice, playing the full 90 minutes. Jureškin scored his first goal for Spartak in a 2–3 loss to Slovan Bratislava in the Traditional derby.

=== Tenerife ===
On 3 August 2026, Jureškin agreed to a one-year contract with Segunda División side Tenerife, with an option for a further year.

== Honours ==
Spartak Trnava

- Slovak Cup: 2024–25

Individual

- Slovak Super Liga Player of the Month: February 2022
- Slovak Super Liga Goal of the Month: February 2022
- Slovak Super Liga U-21 Team of the Season: 2021–22
