= Matej Loduha =

Slovak footballer

Personal information
- Full name: Matej Loduha
- Date of birth: 28 May 1993 (age 33)
- Place of birth: Slovakia
- Position: Defender

Team information
- Current team: Púchov
- Number: 19

Youth career
- 2008–2012: Púchov

Senior career*
| Years | Team | Apps | (Gls) |
| 2012–2013 | Púchov | | |
| 2012 | → Dubnica (loan) | | |
| 2013–2021 | iClinic Sereď | 127 | (8) |
| 2020–2021 | → Púchov (loan) | 27 | (2) |
| 2021– | Púchov | 92 | (3) |
- * Club domestic league appearances and goals as of 18 January 2026

Matej Loduha (born 28 May 1993) is a Slovak professional footballer who currently plays for 2. liga club MŠK Púchov.

== Club career ==
=== ŠKF iClinic Sereď ===
Loduha made his Fortuna Liga debut for iClnic Sereď against Ružomberok on 21 July 2018.
