= Rudolf Bilas =

Slovak footballer

Personal information
- Date of birth: 10 November 1992 (age 34)
- Place of birth: Svidník, Czechoslovakia
- Height: 1.85 m (6 ft 1 in)
- Position: Midfielder

Team information
- Current team: FC Weesen
- Number: 14

Youth career
- Stropkov

Senior career*
Years	Team	Apps	(Gls)
2012–2013	Tesla Stropkov	28	(8)
2013–2014	→ Kremnička (loan)	18	(1)
2014–2015	→ Lokomotíva Zvolen (loan)	20	(2)
2015	→ Poprad (loan)	18	(7)
2016–2017	Poprad	37	(14)
2017–2019	iClinic Sereď	42	(6)
2019	Tesla Stropkov	7	(3)
2020–	FC Weesen	12	(0)
- * Club domestic league appearances and goals as of 20:10, 25 August 2021 (UTC)

Rudolf Bilas (born 10 November 1992) is a Slovak football midfielder who currently plays for SC Weesen in 2. Liga Interregional.

== Club career ==
Bilas made his Fortuna Liga debut for iClinic Sereď against Železiarne Podbrezová on 25 August 2018, when he came on as a replacement for Filip Pankarićan some ten minutes before the end.
