= Bruno Dip =

Brazilian footballer

Personal information
- Full name: Bruno Dip Rapanelli
- Date of birth: 17 February 1998 (age 28)
- Place of birth: São Paulo, Brazil
- Height: 1.81 m (5 ft 11 in)
- Position: Left back

Team information
- Current team: FC Cascavel

Youth career
- 2013–2019: São Paulo

Senior career*
Years	Team	Apps	(Gls)
2019–2020	São Paulo		
2019	→ Atlético Goianiense (loan)		
2019	→ Vila Nova (loan)		
2019–2020	→ Sered (loan)		
2020	→ Penapolense (loan)		
2020	Camboriú		
2021–2022	Juventus-SC		
2023	Monte Azul		
2023	Operário-MS		
2024	Amazonas		
2025–	FC Cascavel		
- * Club domestic league appearances and goals as of 14 January 2025

Bruno Dip Rapanelli (born 17 February 1994), better known as Bruno Dip, is a Brazilian professional footballer who plays as a left back for FC Cascavel.

== Career ==
Revealed by São Paulo FC, dIP played in the club's youth categories, being part of the runner-up squad of the Copa São Paulo de Futebol Jr. in 2018, in addition to winning the Copa do Brasil, Supercopa do Brasil and Campeonato Brasileiro de Aspirantes titles. With competition from Igor Liziero and Welington, he ended up not being used professionally, being loaned out several times. In 2024, he signed a contract with Amazonas FC.

For the 2025 season, Dip signed a contract with FC Cascavel.

== Honours ==
São Paulo

- Campeonato Brasileiro Sub-23: 2018
- Copa do Brasil Sub-20: 2018
- Supercopa do Brasil Sub-20: 2018
