= Denis Potoma =

Slovak under-21 international footballer

Personal information
- Full name: Denis Potoma
- Date of birth: 15 February 2000 (age 26)
- Place of birth: Svidník, Slovakia
- Position: Attacking midfielder

Team information
- Current team: Rekord Bielsko-Biała
- Number: 9

Youth career
- 2009–2014: Tesla Stropkov
- 2014–2019: Slovan Bratislava

Senior career*
Years	Team	Apps	(Gls)
2019–2020	Slovan Bratislava	1	(0)
2020	→ Sereď (loan)	24	(1)
2021–2022	Orion Tip Sereď	39	(0)
2022–2023	Skalica	15	(0)
2023–2024	Sandecja Nowy Sącz	48	(2)
2024–2025	Tatran Prešov	28	(0)
2025–2026	Považská Bystrica	24	(5)
2026–	Rekord Bielsko-Biała	0	(0)

International career
2016–2017	Slovakia U17	11	(2)
2018	Slovakia U19	2	(0)
2021	Slovakia U21	2	(0)
- * Club domestic league appearances and goals as of 25 May 2026

Denis Potoma (born 15 February 2000) is a Slovak professional footballer who plays as an attacking midfielder for II liga club Rekord Bielsko-Biała.

== Club career ==
=== Slovan Bratislava ===
Potoma joined Slovan Bratislava's youth team in 2014, initially on loan from eastern-Slovak lower division club Tesla Stropkov, which later became a transfer.

He made his debut for Slovan's senior team in the final game of the 2018–19 Slovak First Football League season, a 3–1 win against Sereď at Tehelné Pole on 24 May 2019. He substituted Aleksandar Čavrić in the 86th minute of the match. Potoma and Slovan were crowned champions after the match.

=== Sereď ===
On 12 February 2020, Slovan had announced that Potoma will spend the upcoming half-season at iClinic Sereď, in hopes of getting league play-time and returning to Slovan prepared to help the first team in the next season.

== Honours ==
Slovan Bratislava

- Slovak Super Liga: 2018–19

Tatran Prešov

- 2. Liga: 2024–25
