= Bankole Adekuoroye =

Nigerian footballer (born 1996)

Personal information
- Full name: Bankole Adekuoroye
- Date of birth: 16 February 1996 (age 30)
- Place of birth: Okitipupa, Nigeria
- Height: 1.80 m (5 ft 11 in)
- Position: Defensive midfielder

Team information
- Current team: Bardejov
- Number: 16

Youth career
- Sunshine Stars
- Lagos Islanders

Senior career*
Years	Team	Apps	(Gls)
–2016	Lagos Islanders		
2016–2017	Noves Spišská Nová Ves	32	(0)
2018–2020	iClinic Sereď	53	(3)
2021	Zemplín Michalovce	11	(0)
2022–	Bardejov	1	(0)
- * Club domestic league appearances and goals as of 26 February 2022

Bankole Adekuoroye (born 16 February 1996) is a Nigerian football midfielder who plays for 2. liga club Partizán Bardejov.

== Club career ==
=== ŠKF iClinic Sereď ===
Adekuoroye made his Fortuna Liga debut for iClinic Sereď against Ružomberok on 21 July 2018.

Adekuoroye requested and was granted a release from the club in January 2021.
