= Nicolas Šumský =

Czech footballer

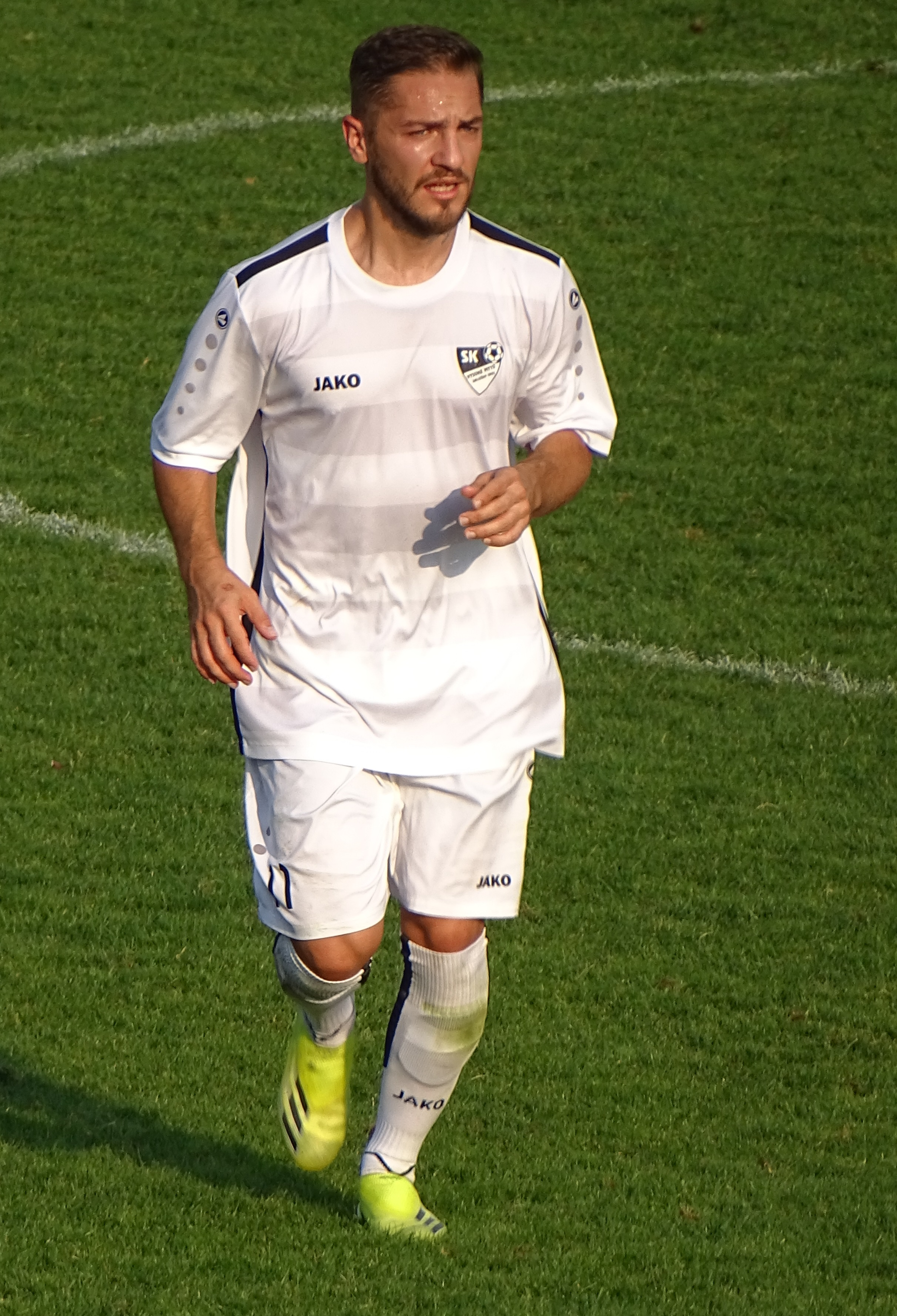
- Šumský in 2011

Personal information
- Date of birth: 13 November 1993 (age 32)
- Place of birth: Hradec Králové, Czech Republic
- Height: 1.68 m (5 ft 6 in)
- Position: Midfielder

Team information
- Current team: SK Vysoké Mýto

Youth career
- Monaco
- Cannes
- River Plate
- Argentinos Juniors

Senior career*
Years	Team	Apps	(Gls)
2011–2013	Bohemians 1905	19	(0)
2013–2014	Parma	0	(0)
2013	→ Gorica (loan)	0	(0)
2014	Vysoké Mýto		
2014	Dukla Banská Bystrica	15	(0)
2015–2016	Hamilton Academical	1	(0)
2015	→ Airdrieonians (loan)	6	(0)
2016	Benešov	0	(0)
2016–2019	Frýdek-Místek	66	(12)
2018–2019	→ Vysočina Jihlava (loan)	5	(0)
2020–2021	Sereď	26	(1)
2021–	Vysoké Mýto		
- * Club domestic league appearances and goals as of 15 September 2021

Nicolas Šumský (born 13 November 1993) is a Czech professional footballer who currently plays as a midfielder for SK Vysoké Mýto.

== Career ==
Šumský played for the youth teams of clubs including Monaco, Cannes, River Plate and Argentinos Juniors. He subsequently played for Bohemians 1905, Parma and Gorica before heading to Vysoké Mýto of the Czech Fourth Division in January 2014.

Following a period with Slovak side Dukla Banská Bystrica, Šumský joined Scottish side Hamilton Academical on a one-year contract in February 2015. In July 2015, he was loaned out to Scottish League One side Airdrieonians. Following the end of his loan period, Šumský was released by Hamilton in January 2016.

Šumský returned to the Czech Republic in February 2016, signing for Dukla Prague and heading immediately to their farm team in the third tier of Czech football, SK Benešov.
