= Abdel Metalsi =

Footballer (born 1994)

Abdel Metalsi)
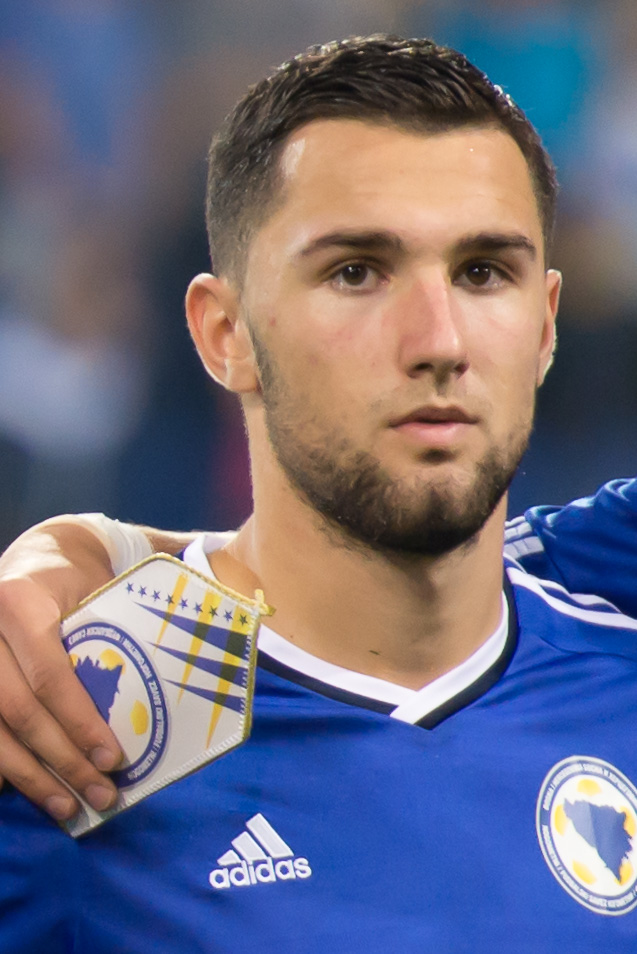
- Metalsi in 2014

Personal information
- Full name: Abdelaziz Metalsi
- Date of birth: 19 April 1994 (age 32)
- Place of birth: Utrecht, Netherlands
- Height: 1.83 m (6 ft 0 in)
- Position: Defender

Team information
- Current team: Sportlust '46
- Number: 25

Youth career
- –2011: SV Argon
- 2011–2013: Vitesse Arnhem

Senior career*
Years	Team	Apps	(Gls)
2013–2015	Vitesse Arnhem	0	(0)
2015–2017	Almere City	25	(1)
2016–2017	Jong Almere City	23	(3)
2017–2018	Mladost Doboj Kakanj	18	(0)
2019	Lienden	16	(0)
2019	iClinic Sereď	5	(0)
2020–	Sportlust '46		(0)

International career
2014	Bosnia and Herzegovina U21		
- * Club domestic league appearances and goals as of 30 December 2019

Abdel Metalsi (born 19 April 1994) is a footballer who played as a defender for Sportlust '46. Born in the Netherlands, he represented Bosnia and Herzegovina at under-21 international level.

== Club career ==
Metalsi made his professional debut in the Eerste Divisie for Almere City on 7 August 2015 in a game against VVV Venlo.

As of the season 2017–18 Abdel played in the Bosnian Premiership for the club Mladost Doboj Kakanj. After a spell at FC Lienden and in Slovakia, he returned to Holland and joined amateur side Sportlust '46.
