= Tomáš Hučko =

Slovak footballer

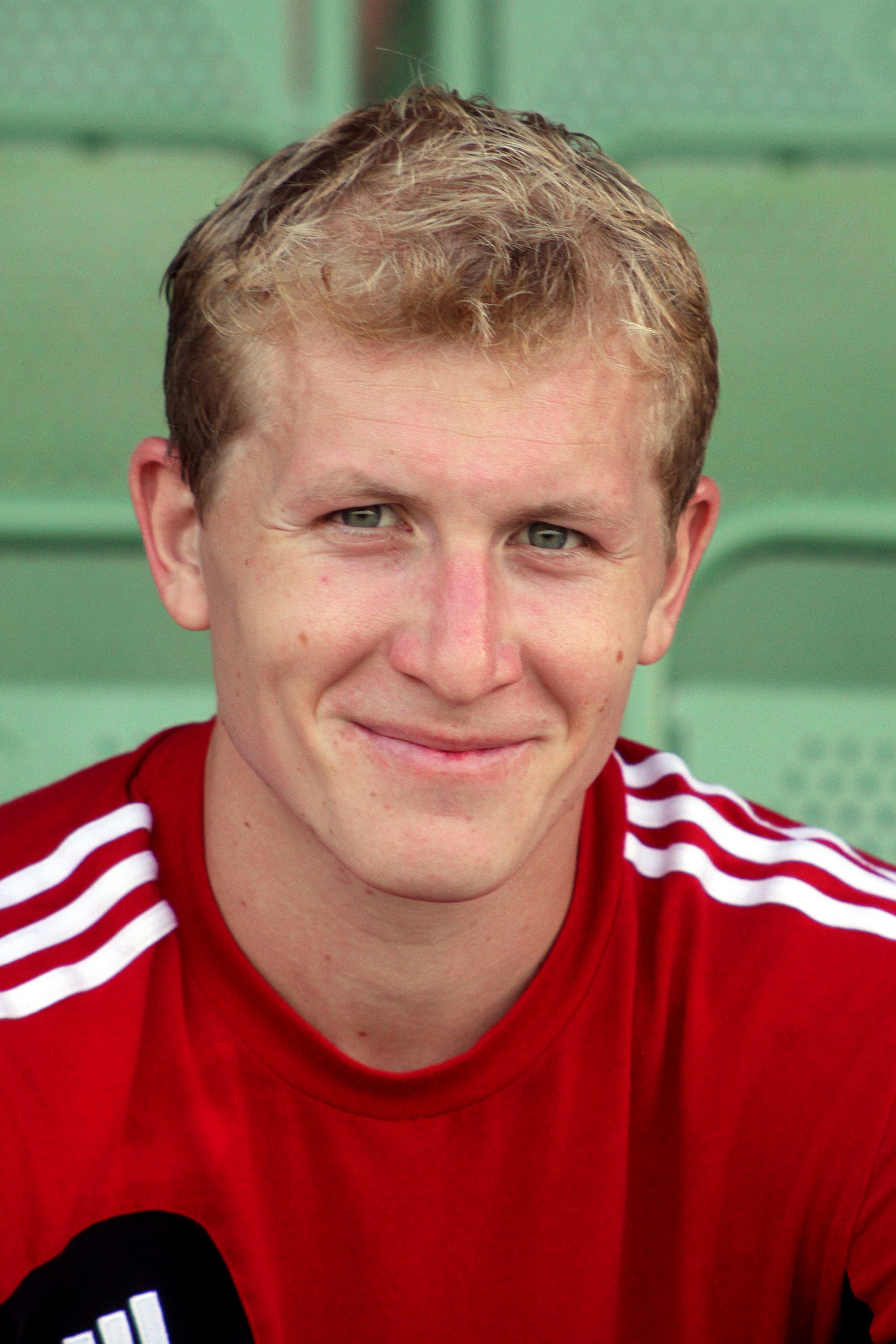

Personal information
- Full name: Tomáš Hučko
- Date of birth: 3 October 1985 (age 41)
- Place of birth: Šaľa, Czechoslovakia
- Height: 1.82 m (5 ft 11 1/2 in)
- Positions: Left back; left winger

Team information
- Current team: Slovan Galanta

Youth career
- 2001–2004: Slovan Duslo Šaľa

Senior career*
Years	Team	Apps	(Gls)
2004–2006	Slovan Duslo Šaľa		
2007–2013	Dukla Banská Bystrica	179	(13)
2013–2018	Žilina	41	(2)
2016–2017	→ Baník Ostrava (loan)	23	(1)
2018–2022	Orion Tip Sereď	89	(5)
2022–	Slovan Galanta	0	(0)
- * Club domestic league appearances and goals as of 7 March 2022

Tomáš Hučko (born 3 October 1985) is a Slovak footballer who plays for Slovan Galanta in 3. Liga - West as a defender.

== Club career ==
Hučko spent most of his career playing in Slovakia, firstly with Dukla Banská Bystrica, who he joined in 2006 and remained for the next seven years. He signed for Žilina in 2013, before moving to Baník Ostrava in the Czech Republic in August 2016.
