= András Mészáros (footballer) =

Slovak footballer

Personal information
- Date of birth: 29 March 1996 (age 30)
- Place of birth: Komárno, Slovakia
- Height: 1.83 m (6 ft 0 in)
- Positions: Winger; forward

Team information
- Current team: BVSC-Zugló
- Number: 21

Youth career
- –2012: Komárno
- 2013–2014: FK 2007 Dunajská Streda
- 2014–2015: DAC Dunajská Streda

Senior career*
Years	Team	Apps	(Gls)
2015–2019	Dunajská Streda	16	(0)
2018–2019	→ Komárno (loan)	32	(8)
2019–2020	Pohronie	15	(2)
2020	→ ViOn Zlaté Moravce (loan)	7	(1)
2020–2021	Sereď	3	(0)
2020	→ FK Csíkszereda (loan)	26	(4)
2021–2022	FK Csíkszereda	9	(0)
2022–2023	Komárno	40	(3)
2023–	BVSC-Zugló	13	(0)
- * Club domestic league appearances and goals as of 21 December 2023

András Mészáros (born 29 March 1996) is a Slovak footballer who plays as a forward for Hungarian club BVSC-Zugló.

== Club career ==
=== DAC Dunajská Streda ===
He made his professional Fortuna Liga debut for DAC Dunajská Streda against Slovan Bratislava on 24 October 2015.
