= Lukáš Kojnok =

Slovak footballer

Personal information
- Full name: Lukáš Kojnok
- Date of birth: 30 May 1997 (age 29)
- Place of birth: Lučenec, Slovakia
- Height: 1.79 m (5 ft 10 in)
- Position: Right-back

Team information
- Current team: Novohrad Lučenec

Youth career
- –2012: LAFC Lučenec
- 2011–2015: Senica
- 2016: Ružomberok

Senior career*
Years	Team	Apps	(Gls)
2016−2017	Liptovský Hrádok	29	(7)
2017−2021	Ružomberok	35	(1)
2021−2022	Dukla Banská Bystrica	15	(0)
2022−	Novohrad Lučenec		
- * Club domestic league appearances and goals as of 15 August 2022

Lukáš Kojnok (born 30 May 1997) is a Slovak professional footballer who plays for MŠK Novohrad Lučenec as a right-back.

== Club career ==
=== MFK Ružomberok ===
Kojnok made his Fortuna Liga debut for Ružomberok against Pohronie on 3 August 2019, in a 0:1 home defeat. He replaced Adam Brenkus as a midfielder in the game during half-time and was booked with a yellow card in the 70th minute, following a foul.
