= Tomás Dabó =

Bissau-Guinean footballer

Personal information
- Full name: Tomás Soares Dabó
- Date of birth: 20 October 1993 (age 33)
- Place of birth: Bissau, Guinea-Bissau
- Height: 1.73 m (5 ft 8 in)
- Position: Right-back

Youth career
- 2011–2012: Braga

Senior career*
Years	Team	Apps	(Gls)
2012–2014	Braga B	36	(2)
2013–2014	Braga	9	(0)
2014–2016	Arouca	14	(0)
2017	Farense	11	(0)
2017	Dacia	2	(0)
2018	Metaloglobus București	6	(0)
2018–2019	Rieti	15	(0)
2019–2020	Sereď	16	(0)
2024	UNA Strassen	1	(0)
Total		110	(2)

International career
2012–2013	Portugal U20	13	(0)
2017–2019	Guinea-Bissau	6	(0)
- * Club domestic league appearances and goals

Tomás Soares Dabó (born 20 October 1993) is a Bissau-Guinean former professional footballer who played as a right-back.

== Club career ==
Born in Bissau, Guinea-Bissau, Dabó finished his development at S.C. Braga. He made his professional debut with their reserves on 11 August 2012, in a 2–2 Segunda Liga away draw against S.L. Benfica B where he featured the full 90 minutes.

On 26 August 2013, Dabó played his first match in the Primeira Liga, again starting in a 2–1 home win over C.F. Os Belenenses. After leaving the Minho Province, he was sparingly used by fellow top-division club F.C. Arouca over two seasons.

Dabó settled rarely in the following years, representing in quick succession S.C. Farense (Portuguese third tier), FC Dacia Chișinău (Moldovan Liga), FC Metaloglobus București (Romanian Liga II), FC Rieti (Italian Serie C) and ŠKF Sereď (Slovak Super Liga).

== International career ==
Dabó represented Portugal at the 2013 FIFA U-20 World Cup in Turkey, appearing in the 2–2 group stage draw against South Korea as the tournament ended in a round-of-16 exit. In 2014, he was called by the Guinea-Bissau national team.

Dabó was selected for the 2017 Africa Cup of Nations by manager Baciro Candé, even though he did not have a club at the time. He earned his first cap on 14 January in the group stage opener, playing the entire 1–1 draw with Gabon.
