= Belá, Žilina District =

Village and municipality in Slovakia

Belá
- Municipality
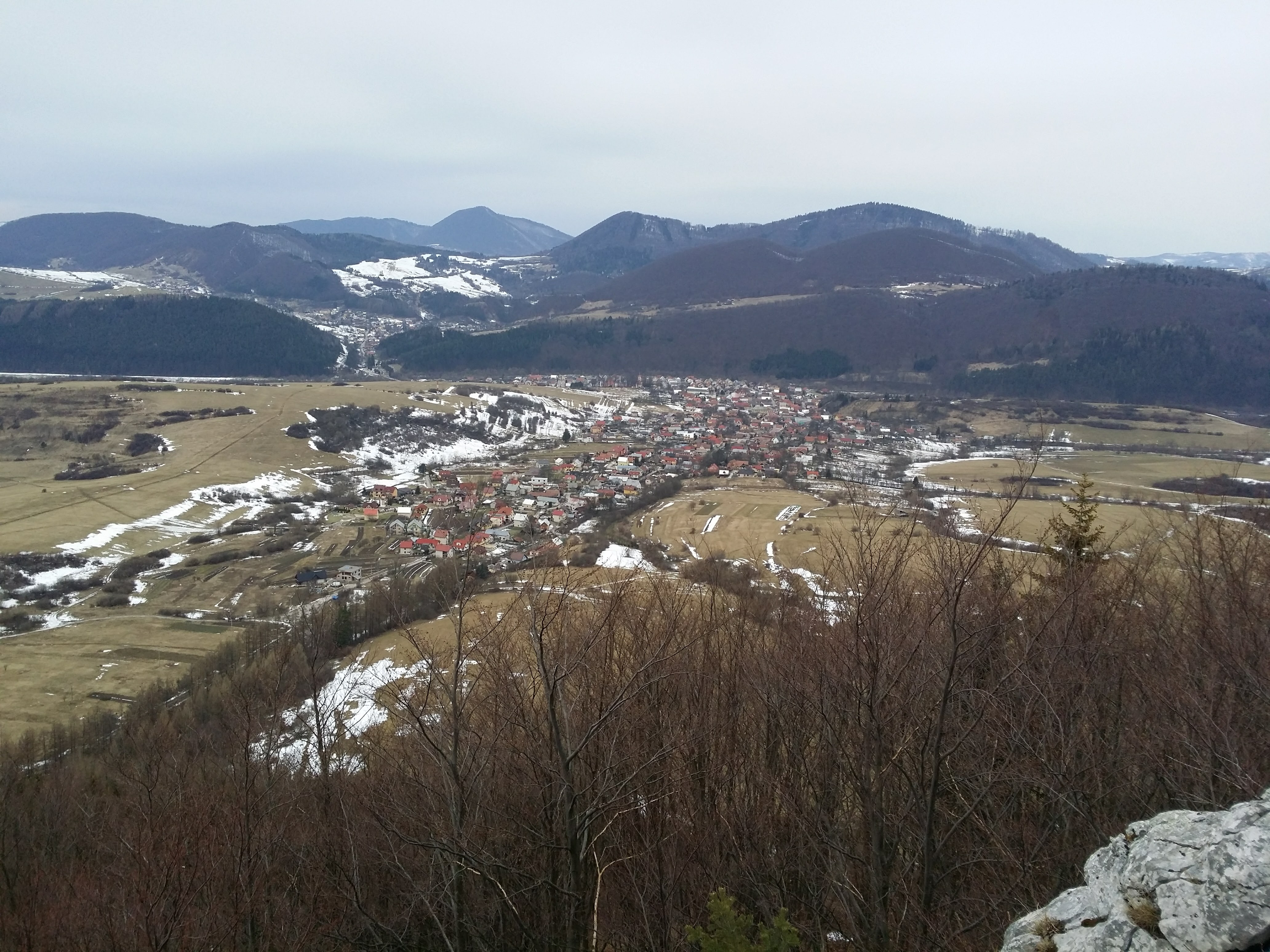

- Flag Coat of arms

- Location of Belá in the Žilina Region Location of Belá in Slovakia
- Coordinates: 49°14′7″N 18°56′44″E
- Country: Slovakia
- Region: Žilina Region
- District: Žilina District
- First mentioned: 1378

Area
  - Total: 38.60 km^{2} (14.90 sq mi)
- Elevation: 494 m (1,621 ft)

Population (2025)
  - Total: 3,240
- Time zone: UTC+1 (CET)
  - Summer (DST): UTC+2 (CEST)
- Postal code: 130 5
- Area code: +421 41
- Vehicle registration plate (until 2022): ZA
- Website: www.bela.sk

Belá (Hungarian: Bella) is a village and municipality in Žilina District in the Žilina Region of northern Slovakia.

== Population ==
Population statistic (10 years)
Year	1995	2005	2015	2025
Count	3067	3341	3374	3240
Difference		+8.93%	+0.98%	−3.97%

Population statistic
Year	2024	2025
Count	3266	3240
Difference		−0.79%

It has a population of 3240 people (31 December 2025).

=== Ethnicity ===
Census 2021 (1+ %)
Ethnicity	Number	Fraction
Slovak	3252	97.42%
Not found out	84	2.51%
Total	3338	

In year 2021 was 3338 people by ethnicity 3252 as Slovak, 84 as Not found out, 24 as Czech, 5 as Other, 2 as Austrian, 1 as Italian, 1 as Rusyn, 1 as Russian, 1 as Romanian, 1 as Hungarian and 1 as Croatian.

Note on population: The difference values of population numbers in the table "Population statistic" and in the sections "Ethnicity" & "Religion" is caused by the use of various statistical methods.

=== Religion ===
Census 2021 (1+ %)
Religion	Number	Fraction
Roman Catholic Church	2965	88.83%
None	225	6.74%
Not found out	83	2.49%
Total	3338	

In year 2021 was 3338 people by religion 2965 from Roman Catholic Church, 225 from None, 83 from Not found out, 21 from Christian Congregations in Slovakia, 11 from Evangelical Church, 6 from Greek Catholic Church, 5 from Ad hoc movements, 4 from Jehovah's Witnesses, 3 from Old Catholic Church, 3 from Calvinist Church, 3 from Eastern Orthodox Church, 2 from Other, 2 from United Methodist Church, 2 from Buddhism, 1 from Paganism and natural spirituality, 1 from Other and not ascertained christian church and 1 from Apostolic Church.

== Genealogical resources ==
The records for genealogical research are available at the state archive "Statny Archiv in Bytca, Slovakia"

- Roman Catholic church records (births/marriages/deaths): 1686-1899 (parish A)

== See also ==
- List of municipalities and towns in Slovakia
