= Gustavo (footballer, born 1999) =

Brazilian footballer (born 1999)

Personal information
- Full name: Gustavo Henrique Cabral de Souza
- Date of birth: 20 December 1999 (age 26)
- Place of birth: Brazil
- Position: Right winger

Team information
- Current team: EC São Bernardo

Senior career*
Years	Team	Apps	(Gls)
−	EC São Bernardo		
2019−2020	→ Zlaté Moravce (loan)	11	(0)
- * Club domestic league appearances and goals as of 14 August 2020

Gustavo Henrique Cabral de Souza (born 20 December 1999), simply known as Gustavo, is a Brazilian footballer, who plays as a right-winger.

== Club career ==
Gustavo made his professional Fortuna Liga debut for FC ViOn Zlaté Moravce against MŠK Žilina on 14 September 2019.
