= Slavomír Pagáč =

Slovak footballer

Personal information
- Full name: Slavomír Pagáč
- Date of birth: 7 January 1997 (age 29)
- Place of birth: Ilava, Slovakia
- Height: 1.84 m (6 ft 0 in)
- Position: Centre back

Team information
- Current team: Považská Bystrica
- Number: 18

Youth career
- –2014: Dubnica
- 2015–2014: Dunajská Streda

Senior career*
Years	Team	Apps	(Gls)
2015	Dubnica	12	(0)
2015–2017	Dunajská Streda	1	(0)
2017–2019	Dubnica		
2019–2021	Komárno	9	(1)
2020–2021	→ Dubnica (loan)	22	(1)
2021–2023	Dubnica	43	(3)
2023–	Považská Bystrica	48	(2)
- * Club domestic league appearances and goals as of 15 June 2025

Slavomír Pagáč (born 7 January 1997) is a Slovak footballer who plays as a centre back for Považská Bystrica.

== Career ==
=== FC DAC 1904 Dunajská Streda ===
Pagáč made his professional debut for FC DAC 1904 Dunajská Streda against MFK Ružomberok on 27 May 2017.
