= Maj Rorič =

Slovenian footballer

Personal information
- Date of birth: 7 February 2000 (age 26)
- Place of birth: Kranj, Slovenia
- Height: 1.78 m (5 ft 10 in)
- Position: Midfielder

Team information
- Current team: Ilirija 1911

Youth career
- –2015: Triglav Kranj
- 2015–2016: Domžale
- 2016–2019: Internazionale

Senior career*
Years	Team	Apps	(Gls)
2018–2020	Internazionale	0	(0)
2019–2020	→ Sereď (loan)	17	(0)
2020–2022	Celje	28	(0)
2022–	Ilirija 1911	34	(4)

International career
2015–2016	Slovenia U16	11	(0)
2016–2017	Slovenia U17	15	(1)
2018	Slovenia U18	2	(0)
2017–2019	Slovenia U19	9	(0)
2021	Slovenia U21	1	(0)
- * Club domestic league appearances and goals as of 12 January 2024

Maj Rorič (born 7 February 2000) is a Slovenian footballer who plays as a midfielder for Ilirija 1911.

== Club career ==
=== Internazionale ===
Rorič joined Internazionale youth teams in the summer of 2016. In 2018, he made several appearances for the senior squad in pre-season friendlies, including the 2018 International Champions Cup.

He started playing for their under-19 squad in the 2018–19 season. On 14 February 2019, Rorič was called up to the senior squad's official game for the first time, for the Europa League match against Rapid Wien, but remained on the bench.

==== Loan to Sereď ====
On 27 August 2019, Rorič joined Slovak club Sereď on a season-long loan. He made his Slovak First League debut for Sereď on 31 August 2019 in a home fixture against Pohronie, starting the game and playing the full 90 minutes in an eventual 3–3 draw.

Rorič scored his premier goal for Sereď in a third round of the 2019–20 Slovak Cup fixture against Petržalka, securing a 3–0 win.
