= Štadión Sereď =

Sports venue located in Sereď

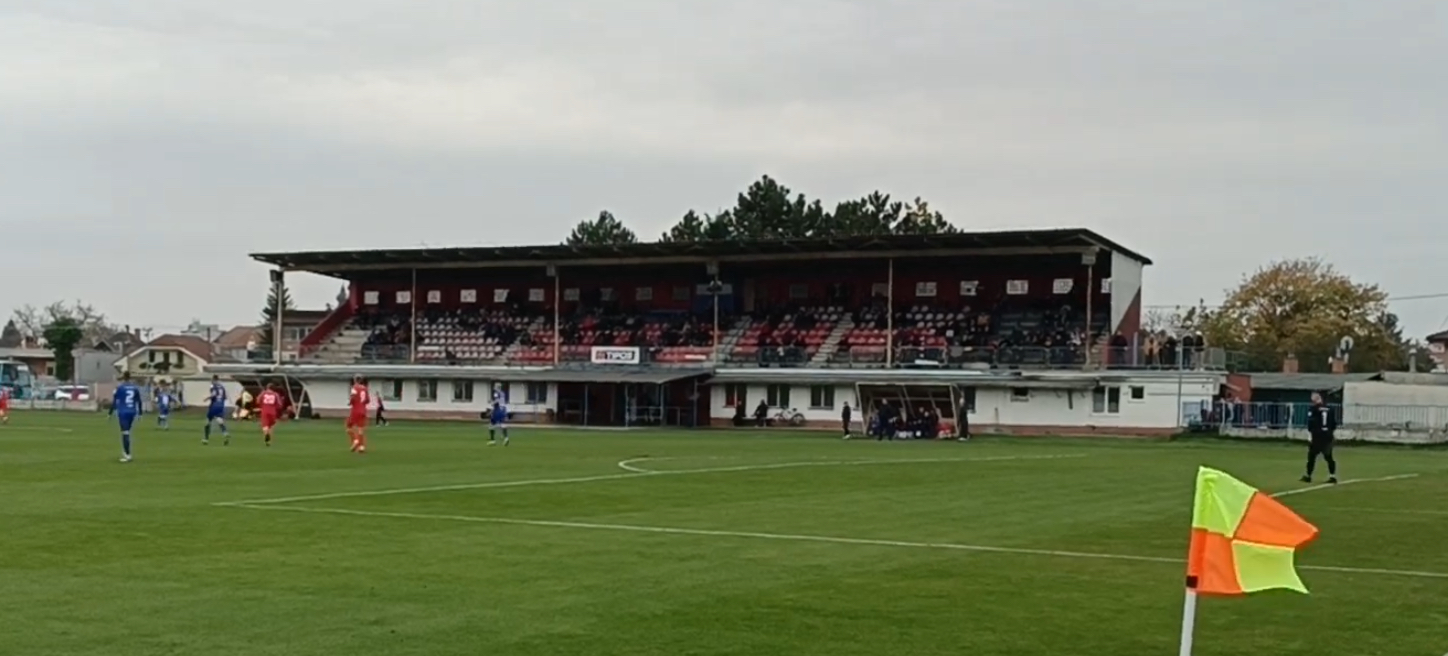
- The stadium in 2025
- Interactive map of Štadión Sereď
- Address: Sereď; Slovakia
- Coordinates: 48.2915297°N 17.7442278°E
- Capacity: 2,800

Štadión Sereď (also referred to as Mestský futbalový štadión Sereď) is a football stadium in Sereď, Slovakia. It has been the home stadium of ŠKF Sereď since its construction. It has a current seated capacity of 2,800.

Since 2018, there has been plans to renovate the stadium, but due to unresolved financing, construction hasn’t ever taken place over the years.

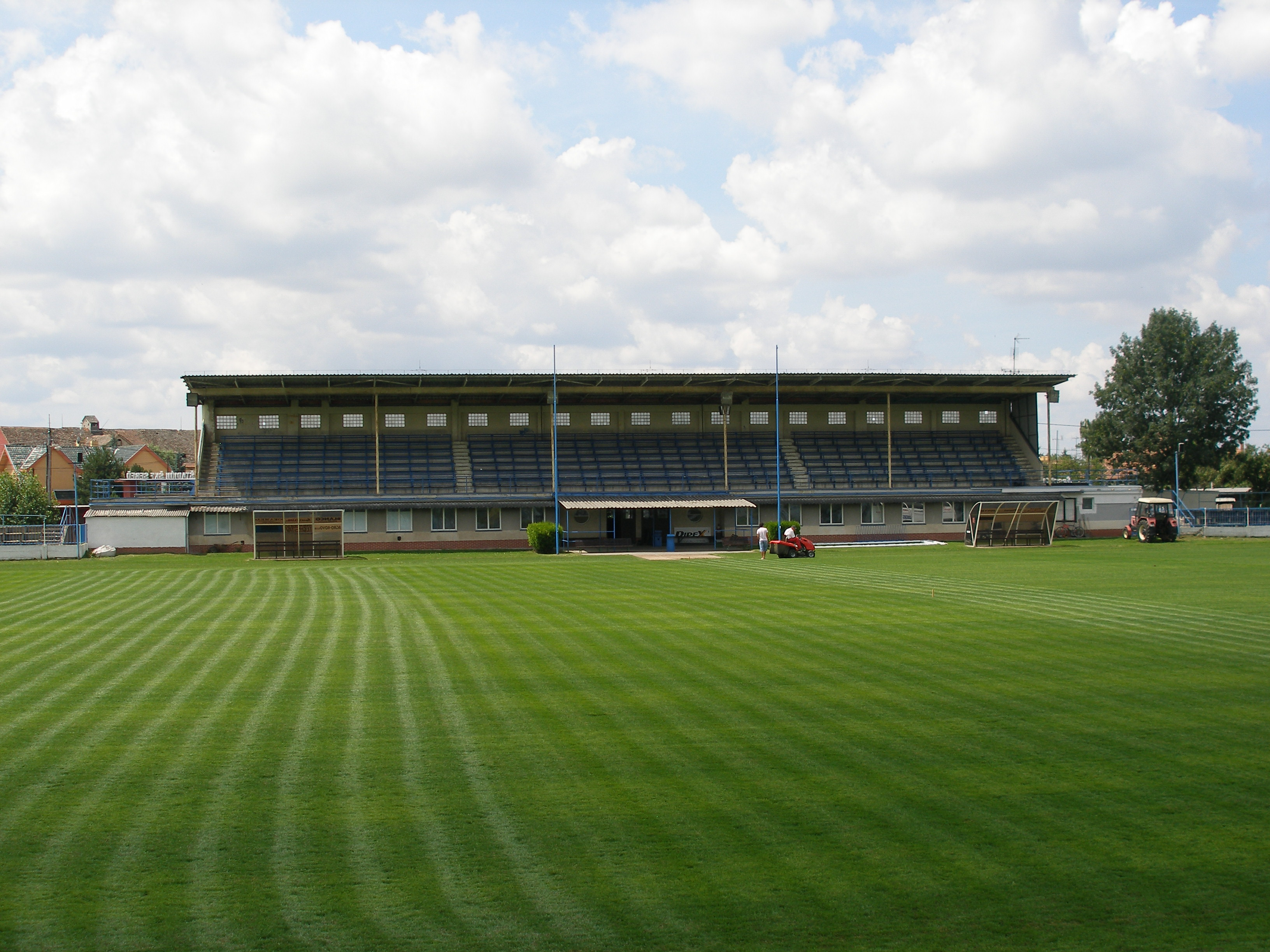
The stadium in 2009

== History ==
The stadium was originally constructed and opened in 1962. In the 2018–19 season, ŠKF Sereď was promoted to the Slovak First Football League, but would not be allowed to play in the Štadión Sereď. They would have to play their home matches in several neighboring cities, Myjava, Nitra, Trnava and Zlaté Moravce. In the 2020–21 season, the club would be forcefully relegated from the league after the refusal to grant a first league license due to inadequate facilities. The stadium was meant to be reconstructed between those years, but had not even started due to unresolved financing. In June 2025, the city of Sereď received approximately one million euros from the Sports Support Fund for the renovation of the Štadión Sereď. Since the total costs of its reconstruction were estimated at 2.5 million euros, further fundraising was needed. A few days later it was announced that ŠKF Sereď would not be allowed to be promoted to the 2. Liga despite winning the league due to the stadium in Sereď not meeting the conditions needed for the competition. In December 2025, it was announced that the reconstruction of the stadium would be cancelled and postponed.

== See also ==
- List of football stadiums in Slovakia
