= Martin Mečiar =

Slovak footballer (born 1993)

Personal information
- Full name: Martin Mečiar
- Date of birth: 23 July 1993 (age 33)
- Place of birth: Slovakia
- Position: Left back

Team information
- Current team: Slovan Galanta

Youth career
- Spartak Trnava

Senior career*
Years	Team	Apps	(Gls)
2013–2016	Spartak Trnava B	54	(4)
2014	→ Ružomberok (loan)	2	(0)
2016	→ Sereď (loan)	12	(5)
2016–	Orion Tip Sereď	97	(14)
2021–	→ Slovan Galanta (loan)	16	(2)
- * Club domestic league appearances and goals as of 14:42, 28 January 2022 (UTC)

Martin Mečiar (born 23 July 1993) is a Slovak football defender who currently plays for Slovan Galanta of 3. Liga West, on loan from Fortuna Liga club Orion Tip Sereď.

== Club career ==
=== ŠKF Sereď ===
Mečiar made his Fortuna Liga debut for Sereď against Ružomberok on 21 July 2018, in a goal-less tie.
