= Dino Špehar =

Croatian footballer

Personal information
- Date of birth: 8 February 1994 (age 32)
- Place of birth: Osijek, Croatia
- Height: 1.76 m (5 ft 9 in)
- Positions: Forward; attacking midfielder

Team information
- Current team: Petržalka
- Number: 9

Youth career
- Osijek
- 2011–2013: Dinamo Zagreb

Senior career*
Years	Team	Apps	(Gls)
2010–2011	Osijek	20	(2)
2011–2015	Dinamo Zagreb	2	(0)
2014	→ Lokomotiva Zagreb (loan)	5	(0)
2014–2015	→ Istra 1961 (loan)	32	(2)
2015–2017	RNK Split	29	(2)
2017–2018	CFR Cluj	0	(0)
2017	→ Concordia Chiajna (loan)	2	(0)
2018	→ Dunărea Călărași (loan)	5	(0)
2018–2019	Kukësi	14	(1)
2019–2021	Sereď	46	(13)
2021–2023	Olimpija Ljubljana	10	(0)
2022	→ Aluminij (loan)	13	(3)
2023	MFK Skalica	6	(0)
2024–	Petržalka	13	(1)

International career
2008	Croatia U14	1	(0)
2009–2010	Croatia U16	6	(1)
2010–2011	Croatia U17	13	(8)
2012	Croatia U18	6	(0)
2011–2013	Croatia U19	11	(0)
2015	Croatia U21	2	(0)
- * Club domestic league appearances and goals as of 22 June 2024

Dino Špehar (born 8 February 1994) is a Croatian professional footballer who plays as a forward for NK Rudeš.

== Club career ==
=== Osijek ===
Špehar began his career playing at youth level for his hometown club Osijek. Before he signed a professional three-year contract with Osijek in October 2010, Špehar scored over 300 goals in his appearances for Osijek's youth categories. He made his debut for the first team in a cup game against Šibenik on 27 October 2010, when he replaced Vedran Nikšić for the final ten minutes of the match. On his first appearance for Osijek in Prva HNL, he scored his first league goal, a late equalizer against Slaven Belupo. In the second leg of Croatian Cup quarter-finals against Dinamo Zagreb, Špehar scored the opening goal but Osijek lost 3–1 and was eliminated with an aggregate score of 5–1.

=== Dinamo Zagreb ===
On 25 August 2011, Špehar signed a seven-year contract with Croatian powerhouse Dinamo Zagreb.

=== RNK Split ===
In June 2015, Špehar terminated his contract with Dinamo Zagreb and signed a three-year contract with RNK Split.

== International career ==
Špehar was a part of the Croatian under-17 team in the qualifications for the 2011 UEFA European Under-17 Championship and scored four goals in six games. Although Croatia finished the qualifiers undefeated, they finished as runners-up in the elite round in the group behind hosts Netherlands and failed to qualify.

== Personal life ==
His father is Robert Špehar, a former Croatian international footballer and the former chairman of NK Osijek.

== Career statistics ==
Appearances and goals by club, season and competition
Club	Season	League		National cup		Continental		Total	
Club	Season	Apps	Goals	Apps	Goals	Apps	Goals	Apps	Goals
Osijek	2010–11	15	1	3	1	—		18	2
Osijek	2011–12	5	1	—		—		5	1
Dinamo Zagreb	2011–12	1	0	—		—		1	0
Dinamo Zagreb	2012–13	1	0	—		—		1	0
Lokomotiva (loan)	2013–14	5	0	—		—		5	0
Istra 1961 (loan)	2014–15	32	2	4	1	—		36	3
RNK Split	2015–16	18	2	0	0	—		18	2
RNK Split	2016–17	11	0	1	0	—		12	0
Total		88	6	8	2	0	0	96	8

== Honours ==
Dunărea Călărași

- Liga II: 2017–18

Olimpija Ljubljana

- Slovenian PrvaLiga: 2022–23
- Slovenian Cup: 2022–23
