= Ľubomír Ulrich =

Slovak footballer (born 1989)

Personal information
- Full name: Ľubomír Ulrich
- Date of birth: 1 February 1989 (age 37)
- Place of birth: Brezová pod Bradlom, Czechoslovakia
- Height: 1.82 m (5 ft 11 1/2 in)
- Position: Striker

Team information
- Current team: Spartak Myjava

Youth career
- Dubnica

Senior career*
Years	Team	Apps	(Gls)
2009–2011	Dubnica	12	(1)
2009	→ Slovan Duslo Šaľa (loan)		(6)
2011–2015	Spartak Myjava	35	(12)
2012–2013	→ Piešťany (loan)	15	(6)
2014–2015	→ Skalica (loan)	27	(16)
2015–2017	Skalica	42	(5)
2018–2019	iClinic Sereď	37	(10)
2020–	Spartak Myjava		
- * Club domestic league appearances and goals as of 30 December 2019

Ľubomír Ulrich (born 1 February 1989) is a Slovak football striker who currently plays for Spartak Myjava.
