= Kristián Lukáčik =

Slovak footballer

Personal information
- Full name: Kristián Lukáčik
- Date of birth: 29 March 1998 (age 28)
- Place of birth: Košice, Slovakia
- Height: 1.85 m (6 ft 1 in)
- Position: Midfielder

Team information
- Current team: Dolný Kubín
- Number: 11

Youth career
- –2006: FC TJ Oravský Podzámok
- 2007–2013: Dolný Kubín
- 2008–2013: → Ružomberok (loan)
- 2014–2017: Železiarne Podbrezová

Senior career*
Years	Team	Apps	(Gls)
2017–2019	Železiarne Podbrezová B	14	(0)
2018	→ Atlético Saguntino (loan)		
2018	→ Liptovský Hrádok (loan)		
2019	→ iClinic Sereď (loan)	4	(0)
2019–2020	iClinic Sereď	8	(0)
2020	→ Senica (loan)	7	(0)
2020	Senica	0	(0)
2021	Dukla Banská Bystrica	5	(0)
2021–	Dolný Kubín	31+	(2)
- * Club domestic league appearances and goals as of 15 October 2023

Kristián Lukáčik (born 29 March 1998) is a Slovak professional footballer who plays as a midfielder for Dolný Kubín.

== Club career ==
=== ŠKF iClinic Sereď ===
Lukáčik made his Fortuna Liga debut for iClinic Sereď against Slovan Bratislava on 16 March 2019.
