= Senad Jarović =

German нprofessional footballer

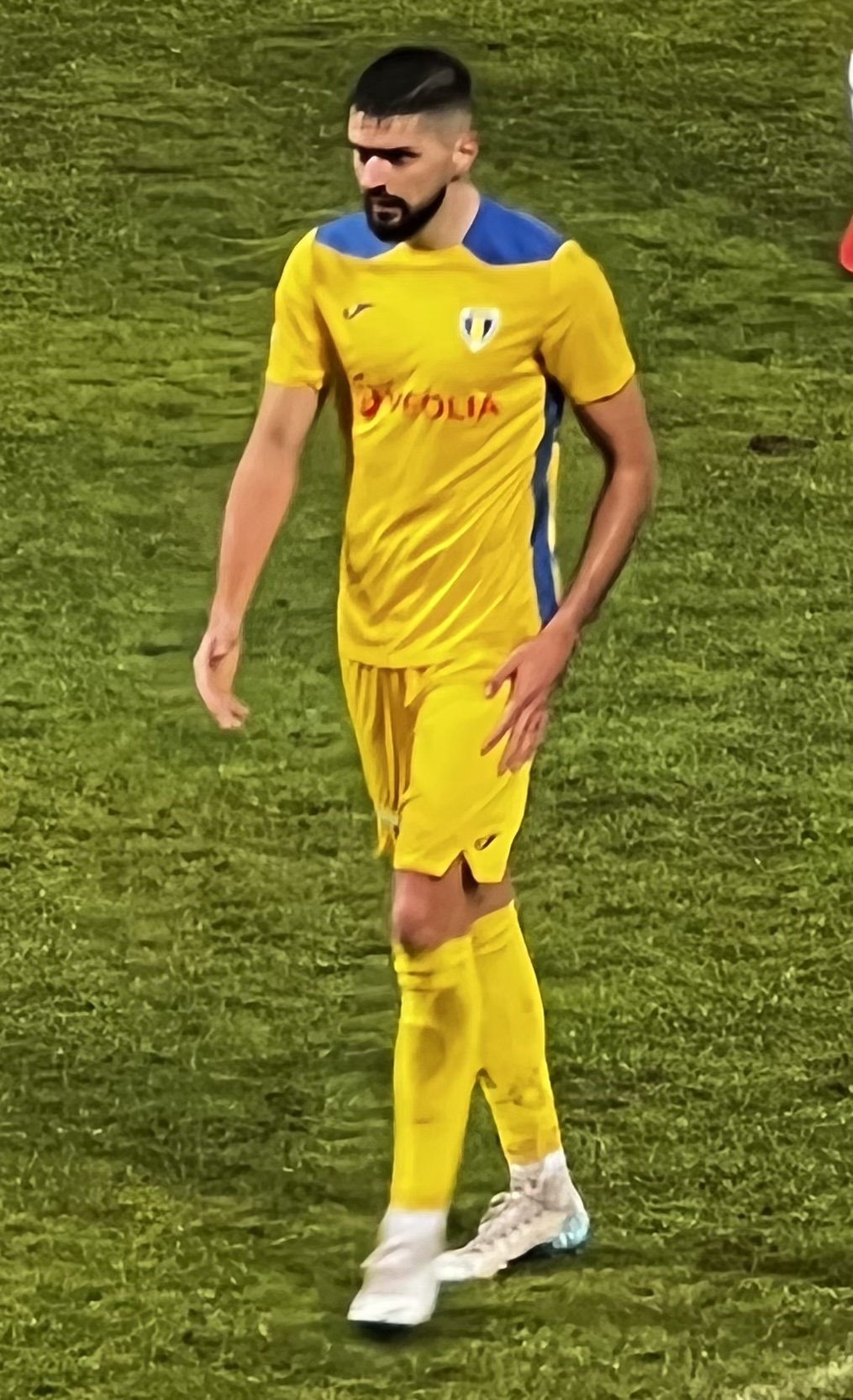
- Jarović with Petrolul Ploiești in 2021

Personal information
- Date of birth: 20 January 1998 (age 28)
- Place of birth: Langenfeld, Germany
- Height: 1.95 m (6 ft 5 in)
- Position: Forward

Team information
- Current team: IR Tangier

Youth career
- 2008–2012: TuSpo Richrath
- 2012–2013: SG Unterrath
- 2013–2015: Fortuna Düsseldorf
- 2015–2016: Domžale

Senior career*
Years	Team	Apps	(Gls)
2016–2018	Domžale	5	(1)
2017–2018	→ Dob (loan)	24	(9)
2018	Spartak Trnava	2	(0)
2019–2020	SønderjyskE	4	(0)
2019	→ ViOn Zlaté Moravce (loan)	13	(4)
2020–2021	Sereď	23	(1)
2021	Kalcer Radomlje	0	(0)
2021–2022	Petrolul Ploiești	17	(4)
2022	Sloboda Tuzla	8	(0)
2023	Minaur Baia Mare	8	(1)
2023–2024	Struga	12	(2)
2024	→ Gjilani (loan)	18	(11)
2024–2026	Gjilani	67	(29)
2026–	IR Tangier	0	(0)
- * Club domestic league appearances and goals as of 18 July 2026

Senad Jarović (born 20 January 1998) is a German professional footballer who plays as a forward for IR Tangier.

== Career ==
Jarović made his professional debut in the Slovenian PrvaLiga for Domžale on 28 February 2016 in a game against Krka and scored on his debut.

On 10 February 2019, Jarović signed with SønderjyskE in the Danish Superliga until the summer 2022. On 21 August 2019, he was loaned out to ViOn Zlaté Moravce for the rest of 2019. SønderjyskE announced on 24 January 2020 that the player's contract had been terminated.

== Personal life ==
Born in Langenfeld, Jarović is of Bosnian descent.

== Honours ==
Petrolul Ploiești

- Liga II: 2021–22
