= Dejan Iliev =

Macedonian footballer (born 1995)

Personal information
- Full name: Dejan Iliev
- Date of birth: 25 February 1995 (age 31)
- Place of birth: Strumica, Macedonia
- Height: 1.95 m (6 ft 5 in)
- Position: Goalkeeper

Youth career
- 2007–2012: Belasica
- 2012–2017: Arsenal

Senior career*
Years	Team	Apps	(Gls)
2017–2022	Arsenal	0	(0)
2019	→ Sereď (loan)	18	(0)
2020	→ Jagiellonia Białystok (loan)	4	(0)
2020–2021	→ Shrewsbury Town (loan)	3	(0)
2021	→ Sereď (loan)	9	(0)
2022	Trenčín	3	(0)
2023	HJK	8	(0)
2024	Sarajevo	12	(0)
2024–2026	UTA Arad	33	(0)
2026	Rapid București	2	(0)

International career^{‡}
2011	Macedonia U17	7	(0)
2012	Macedonia U19	5	(0)
2013–2014	Macedonia U21	3	(0)
2022–	North Macedonia	1	(0)
- * Club domestic league appearances and goals as of 15 February 2026 ‡ National team caps and goals as of 20 June 2022

Dejan Iliev (Macedonian: Дејан Илиев; born 25 February 1995) is a Macedonian professional footballer who plays as a goalkeeper.

== Career ==
=== Early life ===
Iliev was born in Strumica, Macedonia and first played youth club football for his hometown club of FK Belasica. He was spotted by Arsenal scouts and signed to join their academy in London in 2012.

=== Arsenal ===
Iliev joined the Arsenal Academy immediately upon signing the youth contract. He signed a three-year contract extension from March 2015 until June 2018, when he signed another extension. Iliev appeared three times in the Arsenal squad as an unused substitute: against Norwich in the Carabao Cup in October 2017; and twice in the UEFA Europa League: against Qarabağ and against Chelsea in the final as the third goalkeeper.

Iliev's contract with the club was terminated in January 2022 by mutual consent.

==== Loan to Sereď ====
In July 2019, he moved to ŠKF Sereď for a one-year loan, and on the 22nd of the same month he made his debut for his new club in the 2–0 loss to Spartak Trnava.

==== Loan to Jagiellonia Białystok ====
After an early end to his loan with ŠKF Sereď, Iliev opted to join Polish Ekstraklasa club Jagiellonia Białystok for the remainder of the 2019–20 season. He made four appearances after suffering an injury.

==== Loan to Shrewsbury Town ====
On 8 October 2020, Iliev joined League One side Shrewsbury Town on a short-term loan deal. On 28 January 2021, he returned to Arsenal.

==== Second loan to Sereď ====
On 26 July 2021, Arsenal announced that Iliev had returned to ŠKF Sereď on a season-long loan deal.

=== AS Trenčín ===
On 7 February 2022, Iliev signed a one-and-a-half-year contract with Fortuna Liga club AS Trenčín. He made his debut in goal on 30 April in a 5–2 victory against Tatran Liptovský Mikuláš.

=== HJK Helsinki ===
On 8 February 2023, Iliev signed with HJK Helsinki in Finland for the 2023 season, with an option for 2024. On 1 August 2023, it was announced that Iliev will be ruled out for the rest of the season following an elbow injury suffered in a Veikkausliiga match against SJK Seinäjoki. At the end of the season, HJK did not exercise their option and Iliev was released.

=== Sarajevo ===
In December 2023, Iliev signed with Bosnian Premier League club Sarajevo. At the end of the season, the club decided not to extend Iliev's contract.

=== UTA Arad ===
On 18 June 2024, Iliev signed with Liga I club UTA Arad.

== International career ==
Iliev has appeared for Macedonia's under-19 and under-21 teams a total of ten times. He has been called up to the senior squad and made his debut in 2022.

== Career statistics ==
=== Club ===
As of match played 15 February 2026

Appearances and goals by club, season and competition
Club	Season	League			National cup (Note: Includes Slovak Cup, Bosnian Cup, Cupa României)		League cup (Note: Includes Finnish League Cup)		Europe		Other		Total	
Club	Season	Division	Apps	Goals	Apps	Goals	Apps	Goals	Apps	Goals	Apps	Goals	Apps	Goals
Arsenal	2017–18	Premier League	0	0	0	0	0	0	0	0	0	0	0	0
Sereď (loan)	2019–20	Slovak First League	18	0	0	0	—		—		—		18	0
Jagiellonia Białystok (loan)	2019–20	Ekstraklasa	4	0	—		—		—		—		4	0
Shrewsbury Town (loan)	2020–21	League One	3	0	0	0	—		—		0	0	3	0
Sereď (loan)	2021–22	Slovak First League	9	0	1	0	—		—		—		10	0
Trenčín	2021–22	Slovak First League	3	0	0	0	—		—		2 (Note: Appearances in Slovak First League European play-offs)	0	5	0
HJK Helsinki	2023	Veikkausliiga	8	0	0	0	2	0	1 (Note: Appearances in UEFA Champions League)	0	—		11	0
Sarajevo	2023–24	Bosnian Premier League	12	0	2	0	—		—		—		14	0
UTA Arad	2024–25	Liga I	19	0	1	0	—		—		—		20	0
UTA Arad	2025–26	Liga I	14	0	0	0	—		—		—		14	0
UTA Arad	Total		33	0	1	0	—		—		—		34	0
Rapid București	2025–26	Liga I	2	0	0	0	—		—		—		2	0
Rapid București	2026–27	Liga I	0	0	—		—		—		—		0	0
Rapid București	Total		2	0	0	0	—		—		—		2	0
Career total			92	0	4	0	2	0	1	0	6	0	105	0

=== International ===
As of match played 5 June 2022

Appearances and goals by national team and year
National team	Year	Apps	Goals
North Macedonia
North Macedonia	2022	1	0
Total		1	0

== Honours ==
Arsenal

- UEFA Europa League runner-up: 2018–19

HJK

- Veikkausliiga: 2023
- Finnish League Cup: 2023
