= Alex Iván =

Slovak footballer

Personal information
- Full name: Alex Iván
- Date of birth: 26 March 1997 (age 29)
- Place of birth: Dunajská Streda, Slovakia
- Height: 1.84 m (6 ft 0 in)
- Position: Winger

Team information
- Current team: Karviná
- Number: 7

Youth career
- 2004–2006: MFK mládeže Dunajská Streda
- 2006–2013: DAC Dunajská Streda
- 2013–2016: ETO Győr
- 2016–2017: Komárno
- 2017: DAC Dunajská Streda

Senior career*
Years	Team	Apps	(Gls)
2017–2019	DAC Dunajská Streda B	34	(11)
2018	→ Petržalka (loan)	13	(1)
2019–2021	Sereď	67	(7)
2021–2023	Spartak Trnava	39	(0)
2023–	Karviná	19	(2)
- * Club domestic league appearances and goals as of 22 June 2024

Alex Iván (born 26 March 1997) is a Slovak footballer who plays as a winger for Czech club Karviná.

== Club career ==
=== ŠKF Sereď ===
Iván made his Fortuna Liga debut for iClinic Sereď against Slovan Bratislava on 23 February 2019.

== Honours ==
Spartak Trnava

- Slovak Cup: 2021–22, 2022–23

Individual

- Slovak Super Liga Goal of the Month: May 2021
