= ŠKF Sereď =

Association football club in Slovakia

- Full name: Športový Klub Futbalu Sereď
- Founded: 28 June 1914; 112 years ago (as Sereďský športový klub)
- Ground: Štadión Sereď
- Capacity: 2,800
- Chairman: Róbert Stareček
- Head coach: TBA
- League: 4. Liga, Group West
- 2025-26: 4. Liga Group West, 12th of 16
- Website: https://www.skficlinicsered.sk/
Home colours	Away colours	Third colours

ŠKF Sereď (Slovak pronunciation: [ˈserec]) is a Slovak football team, based in the town of Sereď, that plays in the 3rd tier 3. Liga, of the Slovak league system. It was founded as Sereďský športový klub in 1914. The club won the Slovak 2. Liga in 2017–18, thereby earning promotion to Slovakia's Super Liga.

== History ==
=== Events timeline ===
- 28 June 1914: Founded as Sereďský Športový Klub
- 1950s: Renamed TJ Slavoj Sereď
- 1966: Renamed TJ Hutník Sereď
- 19??: Renamed ŠKF Sereď
- 2018: Renamed ŠKF iClinic Sereď for sponsorship reasons
- 2020: Reverted to ŠKF Sereď
- 2021: Renamed to ŠKF Orion Tip Sereď for sponsorship reasons

=== Promotion to Fortuna Liga ===
Sereď played the 2017–18 season in the 2. Liga of the Slovak league system. They place first in the competition and won promotion to play in the 2018-19 Slovak Super Liga season. In the 2021–22 Fortua Liga season, Sereď finished as 5th team, but were denied a license for the next season, because the club lacked infrastructure - a stadium.

=== Financial problems ===
Even though they had won the 3. Liga in the 2024-25 season, Sered would have to be relegated to the 4. League due to financial problems.

== Honours ==
=== Domestic ===
- Slovak Second Division
  - Champions (1): 2017–18 (promoted)

== Notable players ==
Had international caps for their respective countries. Players whose name is listed in bold represented their countries while playing for Sered.

- (Guinea-Bissau) Tomás Dabó
- (Djibouti) Warsama Hassan
- (North Macedonia) Dejan Iliev
- (Slovakia) Ľubomír Michalík
- (Armenia) Vahagn Militosyan
- (Uruguay) Álvaro Pereira
- (North Macedonia) Dejan Peševski
- (Slovakia) Peter Petráš
- (Nigeria) Eneji Moses
- (Trinidad and Tobago) Kathon St. Hillaire
- (Slovakia) Štefan Senecký
- (Slovakia) Martin Šulek
- (North Macedonia) **Todor Todoroski**
- (Croatia) Roko Jureškin

== Managers ==
- (Czechoslovakia) Dušan Radolský (1986–1987)
- (Slovakia) Marián Süttö (2009)
- (Slovakia) Tibor Meszlényi (2010)
- (Slovakia) Tibor Meszlényi (2014– 2016)
- (Slovakia) Marián Süttö (2016– 28 Jun 2017)
- (Slovakia) Marián Šarmír (28 Jun 2017 – 2018)
- (Slovakia) Michal Gašparík (2018 – 4 Sep 2018)
- (Czech Republic) Karel Stromšík (4 Sep 2018 – 30 May 2019)
- (North Macedonia) Slavče Vojneski (28 Jun 2019 – 12 Dec 2019)
- (Slovakia) Roland Praj (19 Dec 2019 – 9 Feb 2020)
- (Slovakia) Peter Lérant (9 Feb 2020 – 15 Dec 2020)
- (Czech Republic) František Šturma (29 Dec 2020 – 7 Mar 2021)
- (Slovakia) Ján Blaháč (16 Feb 2021 – 7 Mar 2021) (car)
- (Slovakia) Gergely Geri (8 Mar 2021 – 2 June 2021)
- (Slovakia) Juraj Jarábek (11 June 2021 - 31 May 2022)
- (Slovakia) Eduard Pagáč (1 July 2022 - 2023)
- (Slovakia) Richard Slezák (2023-2025)
- (Slovakia) Róbert Scherhaufer (2025-2026)
