= 2013–14 FC Nitra season =

Nitra
2013–14 season
- Manager: Jozef Vukušič (until 10 June 2013); Ladislav Šimčo (from 10 June 2013 to 27 August 2013); Igor Demo (caretaker, from 27 August 2013 to 10 September 2013); Vladimír Koník (from 10 September 2013 to 7 January 2014); Ladislav Hudec (from 19 February 2014)
- Stadium: Štadión pod Zoborom
- Slovak First Football League: 12th (relegated)
- Slovak Cup: Second round
- Top goalscorer: League: Cléber (8); All: Cléber (8)
- Highest home attendance: 2,285 v Spartak Trnava (13 September 2013, Slovak First Football League)
- Lowest home attendance: 515 v DAC 1904 Dunajská Streda (29 November 2013, Slovak First Football League)
- Average home league attendance: 1,104
- Biggest win: 3–0 v Spartak Myjava (Home, 29 March 2014, Slovak First Football League); 3–0 v Spartak Trnava (Home, 16 May 2014, Slovak First Football League)
- Biggest defeat: 0–5 v Slovan Bratislava (Away, 18 September 2013, Slovak First Football League)

The 2013–14 season was Football Club Nitra's 9th consecutive season in the Slovak First Football League. In addition to the domestic league, Nitra participated in this season's edition of the Slovak Cup.

== Squad ==
Note: Flags indicate national team as defined under FIFA eligibility rules; some limited exceptions apply. Players may hold more than one non-FIFA nationality.

No.	Pos.	Nation	Player
1	GK	SVK	Matúš Putnocký
2	DF	SVK	Marián Kolmokov
3	MF	SVK	Jaroslav Kolbas (vice-captain)
4	MF	SVK	Martin Boszorád
5	MF	SVK	René Kotrík
6	DF	SVK	Ján Harbuľák
7	FW	SVK	Matúš Paukner
8	MF	SVK	Denis Čery
9	FW	SVK	Matúš Mikuš
10	MF	BRA	Cléber (captain)
12	MF	SVK	Filip Moravčík
13	MF	SVK	Vratislav Gajdoš
15	MF	SVK	Andrej Ivančík
16	MF	SVK	Radoslav Augustín
17	DF	SVK	Peter Mičic

No.	Pos.	Nation	Player
18	DF	SVK	Marek Dubeň
20	MF	CZE	Lukáš Kutra
21	DF	SVK	Henrich Kováč
22	GK	SVK	Matej Kopecký
23	DF	SVK	Róbert Pillár
24	FW	SVK	Viktor Kráľ
27	FW	SVK	Šimon Šmehýl
28	DF	GHA	John Mensah
29	MF	SVK	Nikolas Špalek
32	DF	CZE	Petr Kaspřák
33	GK	SVK	Richard Stránsky
35	GK	SVK	Patrik Hipp
36	MF	SVK	Jozef Urblík
37	DF	SVK	Martin Husár
39	FW	CZE	Jiří Böhm

== Transfers ==
=== Summer ===
In: Note: Flags indicate national team as defined under FIFA eligibility rules; some limited exceptions apply. Players may hold more than one non-FIFA nationality.

No.	Pos.	Nation	Player
—	FW	SVK	Matúš Paukner (loan return from Partizán Bardejov)
—	MF	SVK	Andrej Ivančík (loan return from FK Slovan Duslo Šaľa)
—	DF	CZE	Martin Hála (on loan from (Czech Republic) SK Sigma Olomouc)
—	FW	CZE	Adam Ševčík (on loan from (Czech Republic) SK Sigma Olomouc)
—	FW	SVK	Emil Le Giang (on loan from FTC Fiľakovo)
—	DF	ESP	Eric Barroso (from (Spain) CD San Fernando)
—	GK	SVK	Dušan Perniš (on loan from ŠK Slovan Bratislava)
—	DF	SVK	Jaroslav Kolbas (on loan from 1. FC Tatran Prešov)
—	MF	SVK	Adrián Čermák (on loan from ŠK Slovan Bratislava)
—	MF	SVK	Tomáš Bagi (on loan from ŠK Slovan Bratislava)

Out: Note: Flags indicate national team as defined under FIFA eligibility rules; some limited exceptions apply. Players may hold more than one non-FIFA nationality.

No.	Pos.	Nation	Player
3	DF	SRB	Miloš Obradović (End of contract)
9	MF	SVK	Martin Jackuliak (loan return to ŠK Slovan Bratislava)
16	DF	SVK	Peter Struhár (to (Hungary) Lombard-Pápa TFC)
17	DF	SVK	Róbert Cicman (loan return to (Czech Republic) SK Slavia Prague)
19	FW	SVK	Henrich Benčík (to (Germany) SV Wacker Burghausen)
21	MF	CMR	Léandre Tawamba (to MFK Ružomberok)
24	MF	SVK	Štefan Zošák (loan return to MŠK Žilina)
31	GK	SVK	Lukáš Hroššo (to (Czech Republic) FC Slovan Liberec)
—	MF	SVK	Emil Le Giang (loan return to FTC Fiľakovo)

=== Winter ===
In: Note: Flags indicate national team as defined under FIFA eligibility rules; some limited exceptions apply. Players may hold more than one non-FIFA nationality.

No.	Pos.	Nation	Player
—	DF	GHA	John Mensah (from (France) Stade Rennais F.C.)
—	GK	SVK	Matúš Putnocký (on loan from ŠK Slovan Bratislava)
—	MF	SVK	Radoslav Augustín (on loan from ŠK Slovan Bratislava)
—	FW	SVK	Matúš Mikuš (from (Austria) FC Admira Wacker Mödling)
—	DF	SVK	Jaroslav Kolbas (on loan from 1. FC Tatran Prešov)
—	DF	SVK	Róbert Pillár (on loan from FK Senica)
—	DF	SVK	Martin Husár (from (Czech Republic) FC Zbrojovka Brno)
—	FW	CZE	Jiří Böhm (from (Czech Republic) SK Zápy)
—	MF	GBS	Vladimir Soares Forbs (from (Japan) FC Osaka)
—	MF	NGR	Franklin Ekene Igwe (from (Czech Republic) FC Fastav Zlín)

Out: Note: Flags indicate national team as defined under FIFA eligibility rules; some limited exceptions apply. Players may hold more than one non-FIFA nationality.

No.	Pos.	Nation	Player
—	GK	SVK	Dušan Perniš (loan return to ŠK Slovan Bratislava)
—	MF	SVK	Miloš Šimončič (Released)
—	DF	CZE	Martin Hála (loan return to (Czech Republic) SK Sigma Olomouc)
—	FW	CZE	Adam Ševčík (loan return to (Czech Republic) SK Sigma Olomouc)
—	DF	SVK	Jaroslav Kolbas (End of contract)
—	DF	SVK	Tomáš Bagi (loan return to ŠK Slovan Bratislava)
—	MF	SVK	Boris Turčák (loan return to ŠK Slovan Bratislava)
—	MF	SVK	Adrián Čermák (loan return to ŠK Slovan Bratislava)
—	GK	SVK	Martin Chudý (Released)
—	MF	SVK	Vratislav Gajdoš (Released)
—	FW	SVK	Tomáš Vestenický (on loan to (Italy) Roma)
—	DF	ESP	Eric Barroso (Released)
—	DF	CZE	Petr Kaspřák (Released)

== Competitions ==
=== Overview ===
Competition	First match	Last match	Starting round	Final position	Record							
Competition	First match	Last match	Starting round	Final position	Pld	W	D	L	GF	GA	GD	Win %
Slovak First Football League	13 July 2013	31 May 2014	Matchday 1	00th	33	6	8	19	33	63	−30	18.18
Slovak Cup	27 August 2013	27 August 2013	Second round	Second round	1	0	1	0	0	0	+0	0.00
Total					34	6	9	19	33	63	−30	17.65

Source: Competitions

=== Slovak First Football League ===
==== League table ====
Pos	Team	Pld	W	D	L	GF	GA	GD	Pts	Qualification or relegation
8	Dukla Banská Bystrica	33	11	9	13	48	48	0	42	
9	Žilina	33	11	7	15	49	50	−1	40	
10	ViOn Zlaté Moravce	33	11	5	17	36	47	−11	38	
11	DAC Dunajská Streda (Note: Dunajská Streda were deducted six points at the end of the season due to match-fixing.)	33	8	8	17	29	57	−28	26	
12	Nitra (R)	33	6	8	19	33	63	−30	26	Relegation to 2. liga West

Source: Niké liga (in Slovak)
Rules for classification: 1) points; 2) goal difference; 3) number of goals scored.
(R) Relegated

==== Results summary ====
Overall								Home						Away					
Pld	W	D	L	GF	GA	GD	Pts	W	D	L	GF	GA	GD	W	D	L	GF	GA	GD
33	6	8	19	33	63	−30	26	6	3	7	23	20	+3	0	5	12	10	43	−33

Source: Corgoň Liga

==== Results by round ====
Round	1	2	3	4	5	6	7	8	9	10	11	12	13	14	15	16	17	18	19	20	21	22	23	24	25	26	27	28	29	30	31	32	33
Ground	A	H	A	H	A	H	A	A	H	A	H	H	A	H	A	H	A	H	H	A	H	A	A	H	A	H	A	H	A	A	H	A	H
Result	L	L	L	D	D	L	L	L	L	L	W	D	L	L	L	L	L	W	D	D	L	L	D	W	L	W	L	L	D	D	W	L	W
Position	11	12	12	12	11	11	11	12	12	12	11	11	11	11	12	12	12	11	11	11	12	12	12	12	12	12	12	12	12	12	12	12	12
Points	0	0	0	1	2	2	2	2	2	2	5	6	6	6	6	6	6	9	10	11	11	11	12	15	15	18	18	18	19	20	23	23	26

Source: Corgoň Liga
A = Away; H = Home; W = Win; D = Draw; L = Loss

==== Matches ====
13 July 2013 1	Trenčín	4–0	Nitra	Trenčín
17:30 CEST (UTC+2)	Štefánik 48'; Adi 53', 62', 72'	Report	Kolmokov (yellow card) 46'	Stadium: Štadión na Sihoti; Attendance: 2,320; Referee: Ján Valášek; Assistant referees: Radomír Sluk, Peter Chládek

20 July 2013 2	Nitra	0–1	Spartak Myjava	Nitra
19:30 CEST (UTC+2)	Šimončič (yellow card) 25'; Hála (yellow card) 58'; Kolmokov (yellow card) 61'; Cléber (yellow card) 76'; Kaspřák (yellow card) 90'	Report	Kukoľ (yellow card) 5' (red card) 23'; Šulek 51'	Stadium: Štadión pod Zoborom; Attendance: 1,259; Referee: Peter Kráľovič; Assistant referees: Tomáš Vorel, Branislav Hancko

27 July 2013 3	Košice	4–2	Nitra	Košice
17:00 CEST (UTC+2)	Sekulić 29'; Pačinda 51', (yellow card) 51'; Viazanko 56'; Duda 73', (yellow card) 80'	Report	Kolmokov (yellow card) 16'; Gajdoš (yellow card) 27'; Kaspřák (yellow card) 32'; Benčík 40', 90'; Hála (yellow card) 54'	Stadium: Štadión Lokomotívy v Čermeli; Attendance: 1,895; Referee: Richard Trutz; Assistant referees: Tomáš Somoláni, Dušan Kubačka

2 August 2013 4	Nitra	3–3	Ružomberok	Nitra
19:30 CEST (UTC+2)	Boszorád (yellow card) 17'; Cléber 33', 62' (pen.), (yellow card) 36'; Benčík (yellow card) 58'; Turčák 70'	Report	Lačný 27', (yellow card) 27'; Tawamba 45'; Adamović (yellow card) 62'; Ďubek (yellow card) 64'; Mičic 90' (o.g.)	Stadium: Štadión pod Zoborom; Attendance: 1,170; Referee: Ivan Kružliak; Assistant referees: Martin Balko, Tomáš Somoláni

11 August 2013 5	Žilina	4–4	Nitra	Žilina
17:30 CEST (UTC+2)	Pečovský 6'; Pich 65', 86' (pen.); Jelić 82'	Report	Gajdoš 2'; Turčák 23'; Šimončič 28', (yellow card) 90'; Barroso (yellow card) 64'; Benčík 74'; Kaspřák (yellow card) 90'	Stadium: Štadión pod Dubňom; Attendance: 1,736; Referee: Boris Marhefka; Assistant referees: Tomáš Somoláni, Mário Roszbeck

17 August 2013 6	Nitra	2–3	ViOn Zlaté Moravce	Nitra
19:30 CEST (UTC+2)	Šimončič (yellow card) 28'; Gajdoš (yellow card) 55'; Benčík (yellow card) 77'; Dubeň 85'; Paukner (yellow card) 88'; Barroso 90'	Report	Pribula 7', 63'; Orávik 58'	Stadium: Štadión pod Zoborom; Attendance: 1,865; Referee: Martin Ježík; Assistant referees: Tomáš Somoláni, Martin Špivák

24 August 2013 7	Dukla Banská Bystrica	4–0	Nitra	Banská Bystrica
19:30 CEST (UTC+2)	Podstavek 19'; Teixeira 24'; Považanec 60'; Jurčo (yellow card) 64'; Slančík 90'	Report	Barroso (yellow card) 29'; Cléber (yellow card) 45'; Kaspřák (yellow card) 62'; Turčák (yellow card) 78'	Stadium: Štadión SNP; Attendance: 2,027; Referee: Pavol Chmura; Assistant referees: Tomáš Mókoš, Milan Cuninka

31 August 2013 8	DAC Dunajská Streda	1–0	Nitra	Dunajská Streda
17:00 CEST (UTC+2)	Szarka 51'; Majerník (yellow card) 90'	Report	Mičic (yellow card) 28'	Stadium: DAC Stadion; Attendance: 1,220; Referee: Ján Valášek; Assistant referees: Roman Slyško, Peter Chládek

13 September 2013 9	Nitra	0–1	Spartak Trnava	Nitra
17:30 CEST (UTC+2)	Turčák (yellow card) 37'; Barroso (yellow card) 83'	Report	Janečka (yellow card) 8'; Hodek 48'	Stadium: Štadión pod Zoborom; Attendance: 2,285; Referee: Jozef Pavlík; Assistant referees: Tomáš Somoláni, Peter Bóllo

18 September 2013 10	Slovan Bratislava	5–0	Nitra	Bratislava
18:00 CEST (UTC+2)	Fořt 2', 51'; Vittek 15', 40'; Bagayoko 28'	Report		Stadium: Pasienky; Attendance: 855; Referee: Pavol Chmura; Assistant referees: Erik Weiss, Radoslav Bobko

21 September 2013 11	Nitra	1–0	Senica	Nitra
17:30 CEST (UTC+2)	Hála (yellow card) 32'; Bagi (yellow card) 60'; Cléber 71'; Kaspřák (yellow card) 88'	Report	Križko (yellow card) 33'; Habánek (yellow card) 55'; Kalabiška (yellow card) 66'	Stadium: Štadión pod Zoborom; Attendance: 730; Referee: Ivan Kružliak; Assistant referees: Roman Slyško, Mário Roszbeck

28 September 2013 12	Nitra	1–1	Trenčín	Nitra
17:30 CEST (UTC+2)	Čermák 6'; Kaspřák (yellow card) 90'	Report	Baéz (yellow card) 41'; Van Kessel 43'	Stadium: Štadión pod Zoborom; Attendance: 690; Referee: Kamil Horváth; Assistant referees: Tomáš Somoláni, Peter Chládek

5 October 2013 13	Spartak Myjava	4–0	Nitra	Myjava
14:30 CEST (UTC+2)	Siva (yellow card) 18'; Kosík (yellow card) 50'; Pekár 60'; Ferenčík 64'; Častulín 83'; Dubeň 90' (o.g.)	Report	Bagi (yellow card) 53'; Kolbas (yellow card) 59'; Hála (yellow card) 90'	Stadium: Stadium Myjava; Attendance: 1,536; Referee: Vladimír Hracho; Assistant referees: Tomáš Vorel, Branislav Hrdlička

19 October 2013 14	Nitra	2–3	Košice	Nitra
17:30 CEST (UTC+2)	Cléber 31'; Bagi (yellow card) 36'; Boszorád 63'; Gajdoš (yellow card) 81'	Report	Hovančík (yellow card) 26'; Pačinda 42', 72'; Šinglár (yellow card) 63', (goal) 70'	Stadium: Štadión pod Zoborom; Attendance: 550; Referee: Ľubomír Samotný; Assistant referees: Tomáš Mókoš, Marián Jankovič

26 October 2013 15	Ružomberok	4–0	Nitra	Ružomberok
14:30 CEST (UTC+2)	Lačný 15', 31', 49'; Zreľák 20'	Report	Kotrík (yellow card) 77'; Turčák (yellow card) 79'	Stadium: Štadión MFK Ružomberok; Attendance: 1,917; Referee: Dušan Sedlák; Assistant referees: Peter Bednár, Peter Jenčura

2 November 2013 16	Nitra	0–2	Žilina	Nitra
14:30 CET (UTC+1)	Bagi (yellow card) 80'	Report	Paur (yellow card) 34', (goal) 59'; Králik 64'	Stadium: Štadión pod Zoborom; Attendance: 698; Referee: Jozef Pavlík; Assistant referees: Erik Weiss, Radomír Sluk

9 November 2013 17	ViOn Zlaté Moravce	3–0	Nitra	Zlaté Moravce
14:30 CET (UTC+1)	Pintér 24'; Chren 60'; Pribula 78'	Report	Kemláge (yellow card) 12'; Kostelný (yellow card) 53'	Stadium: Štadión FC ViOn; Attendance: 1,040; Referee: Miroslav Fajčík; Assistant referees: Tomáš Mókoš, Peter Bóllo

23 November 2013 18	Nitra	2–0	Dukla Banská Bystrica	Nitra
14:30 CET (UTC+1)	Bagi 11'; Cléber 49'; Boszorád (yellow card) 61'; Šimončič (yellow card) 90'	Report	Savić (yellow card) 36'; Turňa (yellow card) 57' (red card) 84'	Stadium: Štadión pod Zoborom; Attendance: 536; Referee: Richard Trutz; Assistant referees: Radomír Sluk, Erik Weiss

29 November 2013 19	Nitra	0–0	DAC Dunajská Streda	Nitra
17:30 CET (UTC+1)	Harbuľák (yellow card) 27'	Report	Beňo (yellow card) 45'	Stadium: Štadión pod Zoborom; Attendance: 515; Referee: Ľubomír Samotný; Assistant referees: Mária Súkeníková, Michal Tomčík

1 March 2014 20	Spartak Trnava	0–0	Nitra	Trnava
14:30 CET (UTC+1)	Kuračka (yellow card) 51'; Banovič (yellow card) 81'; Čarnota (yellow card) 90'	Report	Kostelný (yellow card) 45' (red card) 70'	Stadium: Anton Malatinský Stadium; Attendance: 258; Referee: Ivan Kružliak; Assistant referees: Erik Weiss, Dušan Hrčka

10 March 2014 21	Nitra	1–2	Slovan Bratislava	Nitra
18:30 CET (UTC+1)	Boszorád (yellow card) 21'; Mikuš 55'	Report	Niňaj 8', (yellow card) 35'; Kladrubský (yellow card) 69'; Žofčák 79'; Gorosito (yellow card) 82'; Perniš (yellow card) 87'	Stadium: Štadión pod Zoborom; Attendance: 2,150; Referee: Miroslav Jaška; Assistant referees: Peter Chládek, Juraj Lieskovský

15 March 2014 22	Senica	2–1	Nitra	Senica
14:00 CET (UTC+1)	Piroska (yellow card) 50', (goal) 81'; Opiela 69'; Kosorin (yellow card) 90'	Report	Kostelný 3'; Kutra (yellow card) 41'; Augustín (yellow card) 48'; Böhm (yellow card) 85'	Stadium: Štadión FK Senica; Attendance: 1,025; Referee: Jozef Pavlík; Assistant referees: Roman Slyško, Karol Poláček

22 March 2014 23	Trenčín	1–1	Nitra	Trenčín
17:30 CET (UTC+1)	Simon 44'; Ramón (yellow card) 58'; Mišák (yellow card) 71'	Report	Mikuš 54'; Šmehýl (yellow card) 63'; Kostelný (yellow card) 78'; Boszorád (yellow card) 82'	Stadium: Štadión na Sihoti; Attendance: 2,032; Referee: Gabriel Michlian; Assistant referees: Tomáš Somoláni, Dušan Kubačka

29 March 2014 24	Nitra	3–0	Spartak Myjava	Nitra
14:30 CET (UTC+1)	Mikuš 30' (pen.), 58'; Kutra (yellow card) 51'; Böhm (yellow card) 64'; Cléber (yellow card) 75', (goal) 86'	Report	Beňo (yellow card) 29'; Daniel (yellow card) 65'; D. Duga (yellow card) 83'; Pekár (yellow card) 89'	Stadium: Štadión pod Zoborom; Attendance: 1,150; Referee: Kamil Horváth; Assistant referees: Roman Slyško, Rastislav Žákech

5 April 2014 25	Košice	1–0	Nitra	Košice
15:30 CEST (UTC+2)	Novák (yellow card) 32'; Haskić 58'; Diaby (yellow card) 63'; Korijkov (yellow card) 68'	Report	Kolbas (yellow card) 56'; Kostelný (yellow card) 63'; Forbs (yellow card) 89'	Stadium: Štadión Lokomotívy v Čermeli; Attendance: 1,822; Referee: Roman Matúš; Assistant referees: Dušan Kubačka, Branislav Hancko

12 April 2014 26	Nitra	3–1	Ružomberok	Nitra
17:30 CEST (UTC+2)	Pillár 21', 58'; Špalek (yellow card) 60'; Mikuš 74'	Report	Kotora 59'; Ďubek (yellow card) 61'; Nosek (yellow card) 89'	Stadium: Štadión pod Zoborom; Attendance: 1,030; Referee: Pavol Chmura; Assistant referees: Peter Chládek, Dušan Petríček

19 April 2014 27	Žilina	3–0	Nitra	Žilina
17:30 CEST (UTC+2)	Škvarka 5', 34'; Mabouka 54'; Škriniar (yellow card) 74'	Report	Šmehýl (red card) 87'	Stadium: Štadión pod Dubňom; Attendance: 2,158; Referee: Ivan Kružliak; Assistant referees: Tomáš Somoláni, Branislav Hancko

26 April 2014 28	Nitra	0–3	ViOn Zlaté Moravce	Nitra
19:30 CEST (UTC+2)	Špalek (yellow card) 21'; Böhm (yellow card) 30'; Kostelný (yellow card) 44'; Kolbas (yellow card) 47' (red card) 58'; Mikuš (yellow card) 54'	Report	Charizopulos (yellow card) 4' (red card) 70'; Chrappan (yellow card) 6'; L. Szabó 9'; Mazan (yellow card) 42'; Pavlenda (yellow card) 67'; Babic (yellow card) 77'; Orávik 85', 90'	Stadium: Štadión pod Zoborom; Attendance: 890; Referee: Štefan Leško; Assistant referees: Tomáš Vorel, Karol Poláček

3 May 2014 29	Dukla Banská Bystrica	0–0	Nitra	Banská Bystrica
17:30 CEST (UTC+2)	Podstavek (red card) 59'; Boroš (yellow card) 59'	Report	Boszorád (yellow card) 55'; Mikuš (yellow card) 71'; Böhm (yellow card) 73'	Stadium: Štadión SNP; Attendance: 1,310; Referee: Dušan Sedlák; Assistant referees: Martin Borsányi, Radoslav Bobko

11 May 2014 30	DAC Dunajská Streda	1–1	Nitra	Dunajská Streda
19:00 CEST (UTC+2)	Matúš 41'; Krišto (yellow card) 76'	Report	Kostelný (yellow card) 32'; Šmehýl 36'; Husár (yellow card) 67'; Böhm (red card) 78'	Stadium: DAC Stadion; Attendance: 6,918; Referee: Ivan Kružliak; Assistant referees: Martin Balko, Gabriel Ádám

16 May 2014 31	Nitra	3–0	Spartak Trnava	Nitra
18:30 CEST (UTC+2)	Mikuš 57'; Pillár 63'; Šmehýl 70'	Report		Stadium: Štadión pod Zoborom; Attendance: 1,590; Referee: Michal Smolák; Assistant referees: Roman Slyško, Dušan Hrčka

20 May 2014 32	Slovan Bratislava	2–1	Nitra	Bratislava
17:30 CEST (UTC+2)	Kolčák 12'; Grendel (yellow card) 55'; Fořt 79'	Report	Pillár (yellow card) 19' (red card) 42'; Cléber 20'	Stadium: Pasienky; Attendance: 962; Referee: Miroslav Jaška; Assistant referees: Tomáš Vorel, Dušan Kubačka

31 May 2014 33	Nitra	2–0	Senica	Nitra
17:30 CEST (UTC+2)	Mikuš 20'; Cléber 29' (pen.); Husár (yellow card) 80'	Report	Kosorin (yellow card) 65'	Stadium: Štadión pod Zoborom; Attendance: 560; Referee: Patrik Hrčka; Assistant referees: Henrich Mikulaj, Dušan Petríček

=== Slovak Cup ===
27 August 2013 Second round	Dunajská Lužná	0–0 (4–3 p)	Nitra	Dunajská Lužná
17:00 CEST (UTC+2)	Tesárik (yellow card) 72'; Sura (yellow card) 90'	Report	Šimončič (yellow card) 74' (yellow-red card) 87'	Stadium: NTC Dunajská Lužná; Attendance: 450; Referee: Ladislav Prešinský; Assistant referees: Martin Borsányi, Peter Čajka
Note: Nitra won 4–3 on penalties.
