= 2016–17 FC Nitra season =

Slovak football club season

FC Nitra
2016–17 season
- Owner: FC Nitra a. s.
- Chairman: Marián Valenta
- Head Coach: Robert Barborík (until 31 December); Ivan Galád (from 1 January)
- Stadium: Štadión pod Zoborom, Nitra
- Slovak 2nd League: 2nd (promoted)
- Slovak Cup: Fifth round
- Top goalscorer: League: Filip Balaj (20); All: Filip Balaj (21)
- Highest home attendance: 703 vs Dukla Banská Bystrica (Second League, 30 July 2016)
- Lowest home attendance: 350 vs FK Spišská Nová Ves (Second League, 22 April 2017)
- Biggest win: 10-1 vs TJ Slovan Brvnište (Slovak Cup, 5 October 2016)
- Biggest defeat: 1–4 vs MFK Skalica (Second League, 13 August 2016); 1–4 vs MŠK Žilina B (Second League, 12 November 2016)
Home colours	Away colours	Third colours

The 2016–17 season was FC Nitra's third and final consecutive season in the second tier of Slovak football. The club finished fifth in the West group during the regular season before going on to finish second in the championship round. However, VSS Košice, who had won the league, subsequently declared bankruptcy, allowing FC Nitra to gain promotion to the top flight instead.

The club changed its head coach once during the season due to unsatisfactory results.

In the 2016–17 Slovak Cup, FC Nitra reached the fifth round, where they were eliminated by Zemplín Michalovce.

== First-team squad ==
As of 30 June 2017

Note: Flags indicate national team as defined under FIFA eligibility rules; some limited exceptions apply. Players may hold more than one non-FIFA nationality.

No.	Pos.	Nation	Player
1	GK	SVK	Adam Bartoň
2	DF	SVK	Marián Kolmokov
3	DF	CMR	Macdonald Niba
3	DF	SVK	Tomáš Galko
4	DF	SVK	Samuel Ďurek
5	DF	SVK	Richard Križan
6	DF	SVK	Juraj Vindiš
7	MF	FRA	Aurélien Ngeyitala
8	FW	SVK	Filip Balaj
9	MF	SVK	Róbert Valenta
10	MF	SVK	Marcel Oravec
10	MF	SVK	Andrej Fábry
11	DF	SVK	Ján Chovanec
13	MF	SVK	René Kotrík
14	MF	SVK	Miloš Šimončič
15	FW	SVK	Andrej Ivančík (captain)
17	MF	SVK	Peter Lupčo

No.	Pos.	Nation	Player
18	FW	CZE	Jan Shejbal
19	FW	CZE	Filip Žák
20	FW	SVK	Marek Fábry
21	DF	SVK	Matúš Kuník
22	DF	SVK	Juraj Križko
23	DF	CZE	Ondřej Vencl
25	FW	SVK	Patrik Abrahám
26	DF	SVK	Adam Dunda
27	MF	SVK	Márius Charizopulos
29	FW	SVK	Christián Steinhübel
31	GK	SVK	Lukáš Hroššo
32	GK	SVK	Dušan Kolmokov
33	GK	SVK	Richard Stránský
97	DF	SVK	Patrik Šurnovský

== Coaching staff ==
As of 30 June 2017

Staff	Job title
(Slovakia) Robert Barborík	Manager (until 31 December)
(Slovakia) Ivan Galád	Manager (from 1 January)
(Slovakia) Martin Babinec	Assistant manager (until 31 December)
(Slovakia) Ján Bíreš	Assistant manager (from 1 January)
(Slovakia) Miroslav König	Goalkeeping coach

== Transfers and contracts ==
=== In ===
Date from	Pos.	Nationality	Player	From	Fee	Ref.
6 July 2016	MF	(Slovakia)	Miloš Šimončič	(Austria) SC Ritzing	Free	
22 July 2016	DF	(Czech Republic)	Ondřej Vencl	(Czech Republic) FK Pardubice	Free	
26 July 2016	DF	(Slovakia)	Ján Chovanec	(Slovakia) Spartak Myjava	Free	
29 July 2016	FW	(Czech Republic)	Filip Žák	(Czech Republic) Sigma Olomouc	Free	

=== Out ===
Date from	Pos.	Nationality	Player	To	Fee	Ref.
8 February 2017	DF	(Slovakia)	Juraj Križko	(Slovakia) Iskra Borčice	Free	
8 February 2017	MF	(Slovakia)	Marcel Oravec	(Austria) FCM Traiskirchen	Free	

=== Loans in ===
Date from	Pos.	Nationality	Player	From	Until	Ref.
18 July 2016	FW	(Czech Republic)	Jan Shejbal	(Czech Republic) FC Hradec Králové	31 December 2016	
1 March 2017	MF	(Slovakia)	Peter Lupčo	(Slovakia) FC Hradec Králové	30 June 2017	

=== Loans out ===
Date from	Pos.	Nationality	Player	To	Until	Ref.
24 February 2017	FW	(Czech Republic)	Filip Žák	(Czech Republic) 1. HFK Olomouc	30 June 2017	
1 March 2017	GK	(Slovakia)	Richard Stránský	(Slovakia) Slovan Galanta	30 June 2017	

== Friendlies ==
Win Draw Loss

=== Pre-season ===
9 July 2016 Friendly	FC Nitra	10–0	FKM Nové Zámky	Nitra-Janíkovce
17:00 CEST	Žák 19', 23', 36'; A. Fábry 30'; Balaj 46', 53', 90'; Ivančík 60', 82'; Šimončič 86'			Stadium: Janíkovce Stadium

16 July 2016 Friendly	FC Nitra	4–0	Dukla Banská Bystrica	Golianovo
17:00 CEST	Chovanec 41'; Ivančík 55', 64'; Charizopulos 78'	Report		Stadium: Golianovo Stadium

20 July 2016 Friendly	FC Nitra	1–0	Lokomotíva Zvolen	Nitra
17:00 CEST	M. Kolmokov 38'			Stadium: Štadión pod Zoborom

23 July 2016 Friendly	FC Nitra	4–1	(Czech Republic) 1. SK Prostějov	Nitra
15:30 CEST	Dunda 8', 58'; Balaj 43'; Chovanec 33'		Fládr 45'	Stadium: Štadión pod Zoborom

=== Mid-season ===
17 January 2017 Friendly	FC Nitra	3–1	(Hungary) Soproni VSE	Nitra
11:00 CET	Ivančík 25', 41'; Ngeyitala 80'	Report	P. Horváth 63'	Stadium: Štadión pod Zoborom

28 January 2017 Friendly	FC Nitra	2–0	(Hungary) Dorogi FC	Nitra
11:00 CET	Žák 60'; M. Kolmokov 72'	Report		Stadium: Štadión pod Zoborom

1 February 2017 Friendly	(Hungary) Vasas Budapest	2–0	FC Nitra	Lipót
16:00 CET	Ádám 54'; Sağlık 89'	Report		Stadium: Lipóti Football Center

7 February 2017 Friendly	FC Nitra	2–1	(Czech Republic) MFK Frýdek-Místek	Nitra
14:00 CET	Balaj 14'; A. Fábry 39'	Report	Mugove 3'	Stadium: Štadión pod Zoborom

11 February 2017 Friendly	MFK Ružomberok	1–0	FC Nitra	Ružomberok
12:00 CET	Mareš 33'			Stadium: Štadión pod Čebraťom

14 February 2017 Friendly	(Czech Republic) Baník Ostrava	5–0	FC Nitra	Orlová
15:00 CET	de Azevedo 13', 26'; Mičola 22'; Urgela 60'; Nerad 89'	Report		Stadium: Na Stuchlíkovci

18 February 2017 Friendly	FC Nitra	1–3	(Czech Republic) SFC Opava	Uherský Brod
11:00 CET	Steinhübel 87' (pen.)	Report	Kuzmanović 10'; Mozol 70'; Helebrand 74'	Stadium: Orelský stadion

25 February 2017 Friendly	(Czech Republic) Sigma Olomouc	1–0	FC Nitra	Olomouc
14:00 CET	Chorý 7' (pen.)	Report		Stadium: Andrův stadion Attendance: 200

== Competitions ==
=== Slovak Second Football League ===
==== League tables ====
===== Regular stage (Group West) =====
Pos	Team	Pld	W	D	L	GF	GA	GD	Pts	Qualification
1	Skalica	22	14	5	3	38	12	+26	47	Qualification for Championship round
2	Sereď	22	14	3	5	50	23	+27	45	Qualification for Championship round
3	Šamorín	22	12	5	5	37	21	+16	41	Qualification for Championship round
4	Žilina B	22	11	6	5	47	26	+21	39	Qualification for Championship round
5	Nitra	22	12	3	7	45	27	+18	39	Qualification for Championship round
6	Pohronie	22	11	3	8	29	30	−1	36	Qualification for Championship round
7	Spartak Trnava juniori	22	10	5	7	39	34	+5	35	Qualification for Relegation round
8	Nové Mesto nad Váhom	22	8	8	6	29	23	+6	32	Qualification for Relegation round
9	Dukla Banská Bystrica	22	3	5	14	19	43	−24	14	Qualification for Relegation round
10	Svätý Jur	22	4	2	16	19	50	−31	14	Qualification for Relegation round
11	Slovan Bratislava B	22	3	5	14	19	48	−29	14	Qualification for Relegation round
12	Martin	22	2	6	14	22	56	−34	12	Qualification for Relegation round

Source: Futbalnet (in Slovak)
Rules for classification: 1) points; 2) goal difference; 3) number of goals scored.

===== Championship round =====
Pos	Team	Pld	W	D	L	GF	GA	GD	Pts	Promotion
1	VSS Košice (C)	30	19	4	7	40	27	+13	61	Withdrew from the league (Note: VSS Košice did not meet club license rules and they went into bankruptcy.)
2	Nitra (P)	34	21	6	7	68	33	+35	59	Promotion to Fortuna Liga
3	Skalica	34	21	7	6	57	21	+36	58	
4	Šamorín	34	19	8	7	54	31	+23	55	
5	Žilina B	34	19	6	9	84	46	+38	51	
6	Sereď	34	17	9	8	68	38	+30	48	
7	Lokomotíva Košice	30	13	8	9	56	42	+14	47	
8	Bardejov	30	14	4	12	48	39	+9	46	
9	Pohronie	34	16	5	13	49	46	+3	46	
10	Liptovský Mikuláš	30	13	6	11	43	36	+7	45	
11	Zvolen	30	9	8	13	38	45	−7	35	
12	Spišská Nová Ves	30	9	1	20	36	67	−31	28	

Source: Futbalnet (in Slovak)
Rules for classification: 1) points; 2) goal difference; 3) number of goals scored.
(C) Champions; (P) Promoted

==== Matches ====
===== Regular stage =====
Win Draw Loss Fixtures

30 July 2016 1	FC Nitra	4-1	Dukla Banská Bystrica	Nitra
18:00 CEST	Balaj 42'; Šimončič (yellow card) 45'; Ivančík 45'; Dunda (yellow card) 57'; Fábry 73'; Chovanec 82'	Report	Memić (yellow card) 4'; Snitka 19'; Fuják (yellow card) 63'; Handžić (yellow card) 71'	Stadium: Štadión pod Zoborom; Attendance: 703; Referee: Adam Somoláni

6 August 2016 2	ŠTK Šamorín	2–0	FC Nitra	Šamorín
17:00 CEST	Auban 31'; Peu 66'; Dos Santos (yellow card) 89'	Report	Vencl (yellow card) 19'; Dunda (yellow card) 45'; Fábry (yellow card) 58'; Balaj (yellow card) 86'; Stránský (yellow card) 89'	Stadium: Pomlé Stadium; Attendance: 475; Referee: Štefan Leško

13 August 2016 3	FC Nitra	1–4	MFK Skalica	Nitra
18:00 CEST	Valenta 7'; Križko (yellow card) 43'; Šimončič (yellow card) 89'	Report	Hlavatovič 15'; Človečko 24'; Hruška 48'; Konečný (yellow card) 73'; Mizerák (yellow card) 75'; Lipták (yellow card) 75'; Šebesta 90'; Jakubek (yellow card) 90'	Stadium: Štadión pod Zoborom; Attendance: 546; Referee: Roland Weiss

21 August 2016 4	FK Pohronie	1–6	FC Nitra	Dolná Ždaňa
16:30 CEST	Nurković 30'; Rolinec (yellow card) 43'	Report	Ivančík 5' (yellow card) 11'; Balaj 6', 51'; Shejbal 18'; Fábry 28'; Križko (yellow card) 51'; Sekereš 72' (o.g.)	Stadium: Dolná Ždaňa Stadium; Attendance: 445; Referee: Boris Marhefka

24 August 2016 5	FC Nitra	2-0	ŠK Svätý Jur	Nitra
18:00 CEST	Balaj 6'; Kolmokov 61'; Shejbal (yellow card) 65'; Chovanec (yellow card) 80'	Report	Kemlage (yellow card) 42'; Hulák (yellow card) 78'	Stadium: Štadión pod Zoborom; Attendance: 680; Referee: Tomáš Marsal

27 August 2016 6	FC Nitra	2-0	MŠK Žilina B	Nitra
19:30 CEST	Balaj 40'; Shejbal (yellow card) 65'; Charizopulos 76'	Report		Stadium: Štadión pod Zoborom; Attendance: 640; Referee: Peter Kráľovič

3 September 2016 7	ŠKF Sereď	1-3	FC Nitra	Sereď
16:00 CEST	Ventúra (yellow card) 7'; Mečiar 11' (pen.) (yellow card) 32'; Kosorín (yellow card) 90'	Report	Charizopulos (yellow card) 10'; Shejbal 25', 59'; Šimončič (yellow card) 39'; Balaj (yellow card) 53'; Križko 83'	Stadium: Štadión Sereď; Attendance: 625; Referee: Peter Vlčej

11 September 2016 8	FC Nitra	3-2	Slovan Bratislava B	Nitra
19:00 CEST	Fábry 14'; Shejbal 27' (yellow card) 87'; Balaj (penalty missed) 52 53'; Charizopulos (yellow card) 59'; Valenta (yellow card) 88'	Report	Bučák (yellow card) 55'; Tichý 62'; Majerčák (yellow card) 64'; Laczkó 84'; Kurčík (yellow card) 90'	Stadium: Štadión pod Zoborom; Attendance: 612; Referee: Bystrík Nemček

17 September 2016 9	MŠK Fomat Martin	1-1	FC Nitra	Žabokreky
15:30 CEST	Ďanovský 63' (yellow card) 85'; Burger (yellow card) 83'	Report	Križko (yellow card) 49'; Shejbal 51'	Stadium: Slovan Žabokreky Stadium; Attendance: 250; Referee: Martin Ježík

24 September 2016 10	FC Nitra	0-1	AFC Nové Mesto	Nitra
17:00 CEST	Kolmokov (yellow card) 28' (yellow-red card) 67'; Ivančík (yellow card) 54'	Report	Kurtin 4'; Šebek (yellow card) 58'	Stadium: Štadión pod Zoborom; Attendance: 593; Referee: Patrik Kmec

2 October 2016 11	Spartak Trnava B	1-0	FC Nitra	Červeník
10:30 CEST	Tomovič (yellow card) 39'; Privat Yao 63'	Report	Križko (yellow card) 86'	Stadium: Slovan Červeník Stadium; Attendance: 248; Referee: Štefan Leško

8 October 2016 12	Dukla Banská Bystrica	1-3	FC Nitra	Banská Bystrica
16:00 CEST	Chupáč (yellow card) 27'; Jakov Džoni 63'	Report	Balaj 27' (pen.); Valenta 37'; Žák 77' (yellow card) 77'	Stadium: Štiavničky; Attendance: 152; Referee: Michal Perašín

15 October 2016 13	FC Nitra	3-0	ŠTK Šamorín	Nitra
16:00 CET	Fábry 8'; Kotrík (yellow card) 35'; Ivančík 75'; Balaj 80'; Charizopulos (yellow card) 81'	Report	Dos Santos (yellow card) 58'; Hajdúch (yellow card) 70'	Stadium: Štadión pod Zoborom; Attendance: 445; Referee: Kamil Horváth

22 October 2016 14	MFK Skalica	4-2	FC Nitra	Skalica
14:30 CET	Szöcs 16'; Šebesta 27', 87'; Milunović 30' (pen.); Hlavatovič (yellow card) 58'; Švrček (yellow card) 61'	Report	Šimončič 38'; Ivančík 44'; Kuník (yellow card) 47'; Kotrík (yellow card) 48'; Shejbal (yellow card) 61'; Charizopulos (penalty missed) 71	Stadium: Mestský štadión Attendance: 703; Referee: Mário Vlk

29 October 2016 15	FC Nitra	0-0	FK Pohronie	Nitra
16:00 CET	Balaj (yellow card) 75'	Report	Sojka (yellow card) 28'	Stadium: Štadión pod Zoborom; Attendance: 368; Referee: Martin Ježík

5 November 2016 16	ŠK Svätý Jur	0-1	FC Nitra	Svätý Jur
14:00 CET	Šimoník (yellow card) 22' (yellow-red card) 61'; Valachovič (yellow card) 76'; Šufliarský (yellow card) 90'	Report	Kuník (yellow card) 20'; Balaj 63' (pen.) (yellow card) 90'	Stadium: Svätý Jur Stadium; Attendance: 98; Referee: Anton Ihring

12 November 2016 17	MŠK Žilina B	4-1	FC Nitra	Žilina
10:30 CET	Haskić 14', 77'; Jánošík 34'; Mbah 36'	Report	Ivančík 49'	Stadium: Štadión pod Dubňom; Attendance: 200; Referee: Július Straka

19 November 2016 18	FC Nitra	2-1	ŠKF Sereď	Nitra
15:00 CET	Balaj 1', 56' (yellow card) 48'; Shejbal (yellow card) 3'	Report	Loduha 54'; Cherednychenko (yellow card) 77'	Stadium: Štadión pod Zoborom; Attendance: 490; Referee: Miroslav Fajčík

5 March 2017 19	Slovan Bratislava B	1-3	FC Nitra	Bratislava
10:30 CEST	Križan 56' (o.g.); Hrnčár (yellow card) 56'	Report	Kotrík 3'; Šimončič 13' (pen.); Ngeyitala 90'	Stadium: Prievoz Stadium; Attendance: 67; Referee: Richard Sedlár

11 March 2017 20	FC Nitra	7-0	MŠK Fomat Martin	Nitra
16:00 CEST	Abrahám 10', 31'; Ngeyitala 19'; Balaj 54', 56'; Valenta 80', 82'	Report	Romančík (yellow card) 51'; Jadroň (yellow card) 80'	Stadium: Štadión pod Zoborom; Attendance: 560; Referee: Peter Vlčej

19 March 2017 21	AFC Nové Mesto	0-0	FC Nitra	Nové Mesto nad Váhom
15:30 CEST	Richtárech (yellow card) 33'; Šebek (yellow card) 75'	Report	Križan (yellow card) 28'; Kotrík (yellow card) 87'	Stadium: Areál AFC Považan; Attendance: 439; Referee: Michal Očenáš

26 March 2017 22	FC Nitra	1-2	Spartak Trnava B	Nitra
15:30 CEST	Križan 18'; Steinhübel (yellow card) 28'; Šimončič (yellow card) 38'; Vencl (yellow card) 81'	Report	Tomovič 11' (yellow card) 18'; Cherednychenko 31' (yellow card) 84'; Horník (yellow card) 74'; Hrebík (yellow card) 89'	Stadium: Štadión pod Zoborom; Attendance: 510; Referee: Gabriel Michlian

===== Championship round =====
Win Draw Loss Fixtures

1 April 2017 23/1	FC Nitra	0-0	Lokomotíva Košice	Nitra
19:00 CEST	Balaj (yellow card) 45' (yellow-red card) 74'; Križan (yellow card) 90'	Report	Horváth (yellow card) 23'; Gáll (yellow card) 86'; Kolek (yellow card) 87'	Stadium: Štadión pod Zoborom; Attendance: 450; Referee: Marek Špaček

9 April 2017 24/2	VSS Košice	2-4	FC Nitra	Košice
16:00 CEST	Bilić 17'; Ngoula (yellow card) 22' (goal) 35'	Report	Šimončič 23' (pen.); Ngeyitala 52', 68'; Abrahám 74'	Stadium: Štadión Lokomotívy; Attendance: 728; Referee: Peter Kráľovič

15 April 2017 25/3	FC Nitra	3-1	Lokomotíva Zvolen	Nitra
16:00 CEST	Charizopulos 9'; Šimončič 37' (pen.); Balaj 86'	Report	Ngango Dikobo 11'; Čery (yellow card) 71'	Stadium: Štadión pod Zoborom; Attendance: 420; Referee: Ivan Kružliak

22 April 2017 26/4	FC Nitra	2-0	FK Spišská Nová Ves	Nitra
19:00 CEST	Balaj 63', 69'; Ďurek (yellow card) 74'	Report	Adekuoroye (yellow card) 45+1'	Stadium: Štadión pod Zoborom; Attendance: 350; Referee: Peter Krivošík

29 April 2017 27/5	Tatran Liptovský Mikuláš	1-1	FC Nitra	Liptovský Mikuláš-Okoličné
16:30 CEST	Lišivka (yellow card) 81'; Kucharčík 85' (pen.)	Report	Balaj 21'; Ďurek (yellow card) 85'}	Stadium: Štadión Okoličné; Attendance: 650; Referee: Martin Ježík

6 May 2017 28/6	FC Nitra	2-0	Partizán Bardejov	Nitra
17:00 CEST	Šimončič 9' (pen.); Charizopulos (yellow card) 28'; Balaj 44'; Abrahám (yellow card) 58'; Fábry (yellow card) 71'	Report	Šosták (red card) 18'	Stadium: Štadión pod Zoborom; Attendance: 510; Referee: Martin Dohál

10 May 2017 29/7	Lokomotíva Košice	1-1	FC Nitra	Družstevná pri Hornáde
17:00 CEST	Jano 16'; Karaš (yellow card) 39'	Report	Fábry 68'; Valenta (yellow card) 83'; Kuník (yellow card) 86'	Stadium: Družstevná pri Hornáde Stadium; Attendance: 200; Referee: Patrik Hrčka

13 May 2017 30/8	FC Nitra	3-0	VSS Košice	Nitra
17:00 CEST	Fábry 29'; Balaj (yellow card) 49'; Šimončič (yellow card) 61' (goal) 68' (pen.); Križan 76'	Report	Drame (yellow card) 27'	Stadium: Štadión pod Zoborom; Attendance: 655; Referee: Pavol Šuniar

20 May 2017 31/9	Lokomotíva Zvolen	0-1	FC Nitra	Zvolen
17:00 CEST	Ngango Dikobo (yellow card) 64' (yellow-red card) 71'	Report	Fábry 39'; Charizopulos (yellow card) 70'; Kuník (yellow card) 74'	Stadium: Futbal Aréna Zvolen; Attendance: 242; Referee: Kamil Horváth

24 May 2017 32/10	FK Spišská Nová Ves	0-3	FC Nitra	Spišská Nová Ves
17:00 CEST		Report	Zekucia 26' (o.g.); Balaj 52'; Valenta 54'	Stadium: Spišská Nová Ves Stadium; Attendance: 300; Referee: Jozef Pavlík

28 May 2017 33/11	FC Nitra	2-1	Tatran Liptovský Mikuláš	Nitra
17:00 CEST	Abrahám 61'; Balaj 71'	Report	Očenáš (yellow card) 2'; Staš 17'	Stadium: Štadión pod Zoborom; Attendance: 580; Referee: Martin Ježík

31 May 2017 34/12	Partizán Bardejov	0-1	FC Nitra	Bardejov
17:00 CEST	Šosták (yellow card) 35'; Rômulo (yellow card) 73'	Report	Fábry 63'; Šimončič (yellow card) 79'	Stadium: Mestský štadión Attendance: 412; Referee: Peter Kráľovič

=== Slovak Cup ===
Win Loss Fixtures

10 August 2016 2R	Topvar Topoľčany	1–3	FC Nitra	Topoľčany
	Salim 72'	Report	Križko 10' *Oravec 15' *Ivančík 82'	Stadium: Štadión Vojtecha Schotterta; Attendance: 400; Referee: Gabriel Michlian

14 September 2016 3R	FK Šalková	0–1	FC Nitra	Banská Bystrica-Šalková
	Mikulec (yellow card) 51' *Debnár (yellow card) 56' *Vučković (yellow card) 78'	Report	Oravec 48' *Ivančík (yellow card) 66' (yellow-red card) 73' *Kotrík (yellow card) 76'	Stadium: Stadium Šalková; Attendance: 550; Referee: Martin Dohál

5 October 2016 4R	TJ Slovan Brvnište	1–10	FC Nitra	Brvnište
	Čelko 17' (pen.) *Háronik (yellow card) 28' *Ofori (yellow card) 59'	Report	Žák 10', 19', 64', 89' *Fábry (yellow card) 17' (goal) 36' *Valenta 29', 65', 85' *Šimončič 54' *Ngeyitala 79'	Stadium: Slovan Brvnište Stadium; Attendance: 450; Referee: Tomáš Trenčanský

22 November 2016 5R	Zemplín Michalovce	3–2	FC Nitra	Michalovce
	Kushta 31', 73' *Grič 83' *Kira (yellow card) 90'	Report	Balaj 33' *Šimončič 45' *Charizopulos (yellow card) 77'	Stadium: Mestský futbalový štadión Attendance: 452; Referee: Július Straka

== Statistics ==
=== Goalscorers ===
Rank	No.	Pos.	Nat.	Player	Second League	Slovak Cup	Total
1	8	FW	(Slovakia)	Filip Balaj	20	1	21
2	10	MF	(Slovakia)	Andrej Fábry	8	1	9
3	14	MF	(Slovakia)	Miloš Šimončič	6	2	8
3	6	MF	(Slovakia)	Róbert Valenta	5	3	8
4	15	FW	(Slovakia)	Andrej Ivančík	5	1	6
5	18	FW	(Czech Republic)	Jan Shejbal	5	0	5
5	19	FW	(Czech Republic)	Filip Žák	1	4	5
6	25	F	(Slovakia)	Patrik Abrahám	4	0	4
7	7	MF	(France)	Aurélien Ngeyitala	2	1	3
8	3	DF	(Cameroon)	Macdonald Niba	2	0	2
8	27	MF	(Slovakia)	Márius Charizopulos	2	0	2
8	5	DF	(Slovakia)	Richard Križan	2	0	2
8	22	DF	(Slovakia)	Juraj Križko	1	1	2
8	10	MF	(Slovakia)	Marcel Oravec	0	2	2
9	11	DF	(Slovakia)	Ján Chovanec	1	0	1
9	23	DF	(Slovakia)	Marián Kolmokov	1	0	1
9	13	MF	(Slovakia)	René Kotrík	1	0	1
Own goals					2	0	0
Totals					68	16	84
