= 2017–18 FC Nitra season =

Slovak football club season

FC Nitra
2017–18 season
- Owner: FC Nitra a. s.
- Chairman: Marián Valenta
- Head Coach: Ivan Galád
- Stadium: Štadión pod Zoborom, Nitra
- Slovak 1st League: 7th
- Slovak Cup: Fifth round
- Top goalscorer: League: Filip Balaj (6); Tomáš Vestenický (6); All: Patrik Abrahám (8)
- Highest home attendance: 5,500 vs DAC Dunajská Streda (First League, 26 August 2017)
- Lowest home attendance: 106 vs Spartak Trnava (First League, 5 December 2017) (Note: FC Nitra played this home match in Trenčín.)
- Biggest win: 8-1 vs MFK Bytča (Slovak Cup, 15 August 2017)
- Biggest defeat: 0–4 vs Zemplín Michalovce (First League, 31 March 2018)
Home colours	Away colours

The 2017–18 season was FC Nitra's first season in the Slovak top flight following their promotion from the second tier at the end of the previous season. FC VSS Košice had originally been due to gain promotion after winning the second division, but the club subsequently declared bankruptcy, allowing FC Nitra to take their place in the top flight after finishing second.

FC Nitra finished seventh in the regular season of the 2017–18 Slovak top division and consequently competed in the relegation group. The club missed out on a place in the championship group by just three points. Nitra finished top of the relegation group, placing seventh overall, and qualified for the UEFA Europa League play-offs. However, they were eliminated by MŠK Žilina in the semi-finals.

FC Nitra played their home matches during the second half of the top-flight season at the stadium in Zlaté Moravce, as redevelopment work began at Štadión pod Zoborom in early 2018, making their home ground unavailable for matches. This situation had a negative impact on the club's attendances.

In the 2017–18 Slovak Cup, FC Nitra reached the fifth round, where they were eliminated by Slovan Bratislava.

== First-team squad ==
As of 30 June 2018

Note: Flags indicate national team as defined under FIFA eligibility rules; some limited exceptions apply. Players may hold more than one non-FIFA nationality.

No.	Pos.	Nation	Player
1	GK	SVK	Dávid Šípoš
2	DF	SVK	Lukáš Fabiš
3	DF	CMR	Macdonald Niba
4	DF	SVK	Samuel Ďurek
5	DF	SVK	Richard Križan
6	MF	SVK	Tomáš Kóňa
7	MF	FRA	Aurélien Ngeyitala
8	FW	SVK	Filip Balaj
9	MF	SVK	Róbert Valenta
10	MF	SVK	Andrej Fábry
11	DF	SVK	Ján Chovanec
12	FW	SVK	Dominik Guláš
13	MF	SVK	René Kotrík
14	MF	SVK	Miloš Šimončič (captain)
15	FW	SVK	Andrej Ivančík

No.	Pos.	Nation	Player
17	DF	SVK	Jaroslav Machovec
19	MF	SVK	Martin Macho
20	FW	SVK	Marek Fábry
21	FW	ARM	Vahagn Militosyan
22	DF	SVK	Matúš Kuník
23	DF	CZE	Ondřej Vencl
24	FW	SVK	Tomáš Vestenický
25	FW	SVK	Patrik Abrahám
26	DF	SVK	Pavol Farkaš
29	FW	SVK	Christián Steinhübel
31	GK	SVK	Lukáš Hroššo
32	GK	SVK	Dušan Kolmokov
33	GK	SVK	Róbert Baláži
66	MF	SVK	Márius Charizopulos
97	DF	SVK	Patrik Šurnovský

== Coaching staff ==
As of 30 June 2018

Staff	Job title
(Slovakia) Ivan Galád	Manager
(Slovakia) Ján Bíreš	Assistant manager
(Slovakia) Rastislav Božik	Assistant manager
(Slovakia) Andrej Štefanka	Assistant manager
(Slovakia) Miroslav König	Goalkeeping coach
(Slovakia) Ivan Štefanov	Team Doctor
(Slovakia) Milan Michalčin	Team Doctor
(Slovakia) Štefan Balla	Physiotherapist

== Transfers and contracts ==
=== In ===
Date from	Pos.	Nationality	Player	From	Fee	Ref.
10 July 2017	MF	(Slovakia)	Tomáš Kóňa	(Slovakia) Slovan Bratislava	Free	
6 September 2017	DF	(Slovakia)	Jaroslav Machovec	(Poland) GKS Tychy	Free	
30 January 2018	FW	(Armenia)	Vahagn Militosyan	(Slovakia) KFC Komárno	Free	
7 March 2018	DF	(Slovakia)	Pavol Farkaš	(Greece) Athlitiki Enosi Larissa F.C.	Free	

=== Out ===
Date from	Pos.	Nationality	Player	To	Fee	Ref.
20 July 2017	GK	(Slovakia)	Adam Bartoň	(Slovakia) FC Pata	Free	
21 July 2017	DF	(Slovakia)	Marián Kolmokov	(Slovakia) OFK Čermany	Free	
27 July 2017	GK	(Slovakia)	Richard Stránský	(Slovakia) ŠKF Sereď	Free	
28 July 2017	FW	(Czech Republic)	Filip Žák	(Czech Republic) FK Hodonín	Free	
8 February 2018	FW	(Slovakia)	Filip Balaj	(Slovakia) MŠK Žilina	€350,000	

== Friendlies ==
Win Draw Loss

=== Pre-season ===
24 June 2017 Friendly	Železiarne Podbrezová	1–2	FC Nitra	Podbrezová
11:00 CEST	Mikuš 42'		Niba 15'; Valenta 29'	Stadium: ZELPO Aréna

1 July 2017 Friendly	Slovan Bratislava	3–2	FC Nitra	Bratislava
18:00 CEST	Kozlovský 26'; Šefčík 62'; de Sa 64'		Ďurek 4'; Vencl 68'	Stadium: Pasienky

7 July 2017 Friendly	Iskra Borčice	0–2	FC Nitra	Borčice
17:00 CEST		Report	Balaj 43'; A. Fábry 45+1'	Stadium: Borčice Stadium

11 July 2017 Friendly	FC Nitra	2–2	Spartak Trnava	Pata
18:00 CEST	Šimončič 80'; Abrahám 81'	Report	Cherednychenko 30'; Egho 77' (pen.)	Stadium: Pata Stadium; Attendance: 800

14 July 2017 Friendly	FC Nitra	1–2	(Czech Republic) Zbrojovka Brno	Nitra
16:00 CEST	Tata Soh 90'	Report	Koné 31'; Kratochvíl 64'	Stadium: Štadión pod Zoborom

=== Mid-season ===
16 January 2018 Friendly	AFC Nové Mesto	1–4	FC Nitra	Nové Mesto nad Váhom
	Bošanský 86'	Report	Balaj 6' (pen.); Kotrík 75'; A. Fábry 79'; Ngeyitala 87'	Stadium: Areál AFC Považan

20 January 2018 Friendly	(Czech Republic) Zbrojovka Brno	2–0	FC Nitra	Brno
12:00 CET	Růsek 29'; Juhar 65'	Report		Stadium: Městský fotbalový stadion Srbská; Referee: Miroslav Zelinka

27 January 2018 Friendly	(Czech Republic) SFC Opava	1–1	FC Nitra	Uherský Brod
12:00 CET	Jursa 49'		A. Fábry 40'	Stadium: Orelský stadion

30 January 2018 Friendly	(Poland) Wisła Płock	2–1	FC Nitra	Larnaka
11:00 CET	Biliński 46' (pen.); Zawada 54'	Report	Charizopulos 45+1'	Stadium: GSZ Stadium

2 February 2018 Friendly	(Poland) Śląsk Wrocław	3–2	FC Nitra	Larnaka
14:00 CET	Celeban 2'; Robak 68' (pen.); Pich 74'	Report	Militosyan 54'; Abrahám 83'	Stadium: GSZ Stadium

6 February 2018 Friendly	(Russia) FC Ufa	0–0	FC Nitra	Belek
14:00 CET				Stadium: Sport Complex

== Competitions ==
=== Slovak First Football League ===
==== League tables ====
===== Regular stage =====
Pos	Team	Pld	W	D	L	GF	GA	GD	Pts	Qualification
1	Spartak Trnava	22	16	2	4	34	16	+18	50	Qualification for the championship group
2	Slovan Bratislava	22	11	8	3	45	26	+19	41	Qualification for the championship group
3	DAC Dunajská Streda	22	10	9	3	29	20	+9	39	Qualification for the championship group
4	Žilina	22	12	1	9	42	35	+7	37	Qualification for the championship group
5	Trenčín	22	10	6	6	54	32	+22	36	Qualification for the championship group
6	Ružomberok	22	8	9	5	31	21	+10	33	Qualification for the championship group
7	Nitra	22	7	9	6	19	14	+5	30	Qualification for the relegation group
8	Zemplín Michalovce	22	6	6	10	18	25	−7	24	Qualification for the relegation group
9	Podbrezová	22	6	2	14	19	37	−18	20	Qualification for the relegation group
10	ViOn Zlaté Moravce	22	7	4	11	28	37	−9	25	Qualification for the relegation group
11	Senica	22	3	5	14	17	42	−25	14	Qualification for the relegation group
12	Tatran Prešov	22	3	5	14	13	44	−31	14	Qualification for the relegation group

Source: Niké liga (in Slovak)
Rules for classification: 1) Points; 2) Head-to-head points; 3) Head-to-head goal difference; 4) Head-to-head away goals scored; 5) Play-off.

===== Relegation group =====
Pos	Team	Pld	W	D	L	GF	GA	GD	Pts	Qualification or relegation
7	Nitra	32	11	12	9	33	29	+4	45	Qualification for Europa League play-offs
8	Zemplín Michalovce	32	11	8	13	35	34	+1	41	
9	Podbrezová	32	11	5	16	29	43	−14	38	
10	ViOn Zlaté Moravce	32	8	7	17	39	52	−13	31	
11	Senica (O)	32	6	8	18	29	58	−29	26	Qualification for relegation play-offs
12	Tatran Prešov (R)	32	5	11	16	22	56	−34	26	Relegation to 2. Liga

Source: Niké liga (in Slovak)
Rules for classification: 1) Points; 2) Head-to-head points; 3) Head-to-head goal difference; 4) Head-to-head away goals scored; 5) Play-off.
(O) Play-off winners; (R) Relegated

==== Matches ====
===== Regular stage =====
Win Draw Loss Fixtures

22 July 2017 1	FC Nitra	1-0	MŠK Žilina	Nitra
18:30 CEST	Balaj 15'; Šimončič (yellow card) 53'; Kóňa (yellow card) 90'	Report	Škvarka (yellow card) 23'; Vavro (yellow card) 90'	Stadium: Štadión pod Zoborom; Attendance: 3,500; Referee: Filip Glova

29 July 2017 2	FC Nitra	0–0	Zemplín Michalovce	Nitra
19:00 CEST		Report		Stadium: Štadión pod Zoborom; Attendance: 2,870; Referee: Jozef Pavlík

4 August 2017 3	1. FC Tatran Prešov	0–4	FC Nitra	Poprad
19:00 CEST	Udeh (yellow card) 77'	Report	Kóňa (yellow card) 22' (goal) 60'; Valenta 70'; Chovanec 74'; Šimončič (penalty missed) 77 83'	Stadium: NTC Poprad; Attendance: 627; Referee: Michal Očenáš
Note: 1. FC Tatran Prešov played their home matches at the stadium in Poprad while their home ground was undergoing redevelopment.

11 August 2017 4	FC Nitra	1–0	ViOn Zlaté Moravce	Nitra
18:30 CEST	Kuník (yellow card) 16'; Ivančík 47'; Kotrík (yellow card) 84'	Report	Nikolić (yellow card) 9' (yellow-red card) 54'; Oliveira (yellow card) 27'; Dobrotka (yellow card) 68'	Stadium: Štadión pod Zoborom; Attendance: 5,135; Referee: Boris Marhefka

19 August 2017 5	FK Senica	0-1	FC Nitra	Senica
19:00 CEST	Čikoš (yellow card) 65'; Jarabica (yellow card) 80' (yellow-red card) 80'; Vaščák (yellow card) 81'; Ďuriš (yellow card) 85'; Medveděv (yellow card) 90'	Report	Charizopulos (yellow card) 40'; Balaj 65' (pen.); Niba (red card) 83'; Fábry (yellow card) 84'; Kuník (yellow card) 90'	Stadium: Štadión FK Senica; Attendance: 915; Referee: Adam Somoláni

26 August 2017 6	FC Nitra	3-1	DAC Dunajská Streda	Nitra
19:00 CEST	Balaj 47', 80'; Kóňa (yellow card) 57'; Charizopulos 83' (yellow card) 84'	Report	Pačinda 20'; Ljubičić (yellow card) 56'; Huk (yellow card) 72'	Stadium: Štadión pod Zoborom; Attendance: 5,500; Referee: Peter Ziemba

10 September 2017 7	Spartak Trnava	2-1	FC Nitra	Trnava
19:09 CEST	Čonka (yellow card) 27'; Lukić (yellow card) 40'; Pehlivan (yellow card) 44'; Brigant 82'; Hladík 90'	Report	Šimončič (yellow card) 15'; Niba (yellow card) 18'; Chovanec (yellow card) 44' (yellow-red card) 90'; Kuník (yellow card) 72'; Ivančík 76'; Hroššo (yellow card) 90'	Stadium: Anton Malatinský Stadium; Attendance: 5,932; Referee: Ivan Kružliak

16 September 2017 8	FC Nitra	1-0	Železiarne Podbrezová	Nitra
19:00 CEST	Kóňa 58'	Report	Mikuš (yellow card) 59'	Stadium: Štadión pod Zoborom; Attendance: 2,450; Referee: Pavol Chmura

20 September 2017 9	AS Trenčín	2-1	FC Nitra	Trenčín
18:30 CEST	Mance 22'; Janga 75'	Report	Kóňa 63'	Stadium: Štadión Sihoť; Attendance: 2,085; Referee: Dušan Sedlák

23 September 2017 10	FC Nitra	0-0	MFK Ružomberok	Nitra
17:00 CEST	Križan (yellow card) 53'; Abrahám (yellow card) 87'	Report	Maslo (yellow card) 52'; Maslo (yellow card) 90'	Stadium: Štadión pod Zoborom; Attendance: 1,150; Referee: Jozef Pavlík

30 September 2017 11	Slovan Bratislava	1-1	FC Nitra	Bratislava
19:04 CEST	Hološko 8'	Report	Križan (yellow card) 84'; Kóňa 88'	Stadium: Tehelné pole Attendance: 723; Referee: Dušan Sedlák

15 October 2017 12	MŠK Žilina	2-0	FC Nitra	Žilina
17:00 CEST	Mráz 22'; Kaša (yellow card) 28'; Križan 58' (o.g.)	Report	Steinhübel (yellow card) 61'; Niba (yellow card) 72'; Hroššo (yellow card) 86'	Stadium: Štadión pod Dubňom; Attendance: 3,927; Referee: Boris Marhefka

21 October 2017 13	Zemplín Michalovce	0-0	FC Nitra	Michalovce
17:00 CET	Kolesár (yellow card) 31'; Grič (yellow card) 88'	Report	Kuník (yellow card) 32'; Sluka (yellow card) 76'	Stadium: Mestský futbalový štadión Attendance: 1,088; Referee: Michal Smolák

28 October 2017 14	FC Nitra	2-0	1. FC Tatran Prešov	Nitra
17:00 CET	Balaj 67' (pen.); Ivančík 69'	Report		Stadium: Štadión pod Zoborom; Attendance: 1,230; Referee: Jozef Pavlík

5 November 2017 15	ViOn Zlaté Moravce	2-2	FC Nitra	Zlaté Moravce
17:00 CET	Sládek 1'; Dobrotka (yellow card) 24'; Záhumenský 43'	Report	Balaj 24' (pen.); Kóňa 28'; Kuník (yellow card) 31'; Kotrík (yellow card) 48'; Vencl (yellow card) 51'	Stadium: ViOn Aréna; Attendance: 2,246; Referee: Ivan Kružliak

18 November 2017 16	FC Nitra	0-0	FK Senica	Nitra
14:00 CET	Machovec (yellow card) 28'	Report	Krč (yellow card) 17'	Stadium: Štadión pod Zoborom; Attendance: 1,019; Referee: Mário Vlk

26 November 2017 17	DAC Dunajská Streda	0-0	FC Nitra	Dunajská Streda
14:00 CET	Mervó (yellow card) 88'	Report	Vencl (yellow card) 41'	Stadium: MOL Aréna; Attendance: 8,727; Referee: Peter Kráľovič

5 December 2017 18	FC Nitra	0-1	Spartak Trnava	Trenčín
17:00 CET	Ngeyitala (yellow card) 30'	Report	Sloboda 89'	Stadium: Štadión Sihoť; Attendance: 106; Referee: Patrik Hrčka
Note: Due to the unplayable condition of the pitch, the match was played at a rearranged date at the stadium in Trenčín.

9 December 2017 19	Železiarne Podbrezová	1-0	FC Nitra	Podbrezová
14:00 CEST	Baéz (yellow card) 29'; Krivák 38'; Leško (yellow card) 40'; Kopičár (yellow card) 79'; Turňa (yellow card) 90'	Report	Niba (yellow card) 13'; Balaj (yellow card) 29'; *Kotrík (yellow card) 38'	Stadium: ZELPO Aréna; Attendance: 637; Referee: Michal Očenáš

18 February 2018 20	FC Nitra	1-1	AS Trenčín	Zlaté Moravce
14:00 CEST	Kotrík 36'; Steinhübel (yellow card) 42'; Kóňa (penalty missed) 78; Križan (yellow card) 88'	Report	El Mahdioui 56'	Stadium: ViOn Aréna; Attendance: 486; Referee: Ivan Kružliak
Note: The match was played in Zlaté Moravce due to the redevelopment of FC Nitra's home stadium.

26 February 2018 21	MFK Ružomberok	0-0	FC Nitra	Ružomberok
15:30 CEST	Gešnábel (yellow card) 32'; Gerec (yellow card) 78'	Report	Fábry (yellow card) 25'; Križan (yellow card) 68'; Niba (yellow card) 70'	Stadium: Štadión pod Čebraťom; Attendance: 535; Referee: Michal Očenáš

3 March 2018 22	FC Nitra	0-1	Slovan Bratislava	Myjava
14:00 CEST	Vencl (yellow card) 52'	Report	Šporar 37'; de Kamps (yellow card) 43'; Bajrić (yellow card) 62'	Stadium: Stadium Myjava; Attendance: 456; Referee: Pavol Chmura
Note: The match was originally scheduled to take place at the stadium in Zlaté Moravce but had to be moved to Myjava for logistical reasons.

===== Relegation group =====
Win Draw Loss Fixtures

10 March 2018 23/1	FK Senica	0-1	FC Nitra	Senica
14:00 CEST	Celis (yellow card) 77' (yellow-red card) 88'	Report	Šimončič (yellow card) 7'; Steinhübel (yellow card) 12'; Šimončič 61'; Charizopulos (yellow card) 65'	Stadium: Štadión FK Senica; Attendance: 584; Referee: Michal Očenáš

17 March 2018 24/2	FC Nitra	1-0	ViOn Zlaté Moravce	Zlaté Moravce
17:00 CEST	Charizopulos (yellow card) 29'; Machovec (yellow card) 44'; Fábry 59'; Šimončič (yellow card) 80'	Report	Ewerton (yellow card) 71'; Pleva (yellow card) 87'	Stadium: ViOn Aréna; Attendance: 492; Referee: Martin Dohál
Note: The match was played in Zlaté Moravce due to the redevelopment of FC Nitra's home stadium.

31 March 2018 25/3	Zemplín Michalovce	4-0	FC Nitra	Michalovce
17:03 CEST	Kolesár 10', 55'; Danko 77'; Kurminowski 90'	Report	Križan (yellow card) 41'; Ngeyitala (yellow card) 50'; Vencl (yellow card) 66'	Stadium: Mestský futbalový štadión Attendance: 1,011; Referee: Jozef Pavlík

7 April 2018 26/4	FC Nitra	0-0	Železiarne Podbrezová	Zlaté Moravce
17:00 CEST	Vestenický (yellow card) 53'	Report		Stadium: ViOn Aréna; Attendance: 311; Referee: Peter Kráľovič
Note: The match was played in Zlaté Moravce due to the redevelopment of FC Nitra's home stadium.

14 April 2018 27/5	FC Nitra	3-2	1. FC Tatran Prešov	Zlaté Moravce
17:00 CEST	Charizopulos (yellow card) 31'; Kotrík (yellow card) 32'; Fabiš (yellow card) 38'; Steinhübel 40'; Vestenický 63', 68'	Report	Micherda 16'; Leško (yellow card) 23' (goal) 28'; Keresteš (yellow card) 43'; Prikryl (yellow card) 56'; Gatarić (yellow card) 84'	Stadium: ViOn Aréna; Attendance: 372; Referee: Kamil Horváth
Note: The match was played in Zlaté Moravce due to the redevelopment of FC Nitra's home stadium.

20 April 2018 28/6	1. FC Tatran Prešov	1-1	FC Nitra	Poprad
17:00 CEST	Gatarić 29'; Bartek (yellow card) 53'; Streňo (yellow card) 80'	Report	Fábry (yellow card) 38'; Vestenický (yellow card) 45' (goal) 86'; Šimončič (yellow card) 83'; Kóňa (yellow card) 90'	Stadium: NTC Poprad; Attendance: 226; Referee: Ivan Kružliak
Note: 1. FC Tatran Prešov played their home matches at the stadium in Poprad while their home ground was undergoing redevelopment.

28 April 2018 29/7	Železiarne Podbrezová	1-0	FC Nitra	Podbrezová
17:00 CEST	Njire 87'	Report	Macho (yellow card) 77'; Kóňa (yellow card) 83'	Stadium: ZELPO Aréna; Attendance: 812; Referee: Filip Glova

5 May 2018 30/8	FC Nitra	1-3	Zemplín Michalovce	Zlaté Moravce
17:00 CEST	Machovec 20' (yellow card) 82'; Križan (yellow card) 69'	Report	Šimčák 38'; Koscelník 51'; Kavka (yellow card) 77'; Bragin 84'	Stadium: ViOn Aréna; Attendance: 324; Referee: Kamil Horváth
Note: The match was played in Zlaté Moravce due to the redevelopment of FC Nitra's home stadium.

12 May 2018 31/9	ViOn Zlaté Moravce	2-2	FC Nitra	Zlaté Moravce
17:45 CEST	Orávik 22' (pen.); Šašinka 51'; Bariš (yellow card) 72'; Kováč (yellow card) 90'; Ewerton (yellow card) 90'	Report	Šimončič 8'; Križan (yellow card) 20'; Niba (yellow card) 21'; Kuník (yellow card) 26'; Vestenický 70'	Stadium: ViOn Aréna; Attendance: 822; Referee: Pavol Chmura

19 May 2018 32/10	FC Nitra	5-2	FK Senica	Zlaté Moravce
17:00 CEST	Vestenický 27', 66'; Farkaš (yellow card) 36' (goal) 84'; Charizopulos 45'; Šimončič (yellow card) 55' (goal) 56'	Report	Kováč 28'; Medveděv (yellow card) 36'; Podhorin 40' (pen.); Otrísal (yellow card) 52'	Stadium: ViOn Aréna; Attendance: 320; Referee: Filip Glova
Note: The match was played in Zlaté Moravce due to the redevelopment of FC Nitra's home stadium.

===== Europa League play-offs =====
Teams placed between 4th and 7th took part in the Europa League play-offs. The best of them played the fourth-placed team of the championship group, and the winner qualified for the first qualifying round of the 2018–19 UEFA Europa League.

====== Semi-finals ======
23 May 2018
17:30 CEST

MŠK Žilina	5–0	FC Nitra
Mráz 12', 22'; Holúbek 37', 45+1'; Káčer 55'; Kaša (yellow card) 67'	Report	Kuník (yellow card) 51'

Štadión pod Dubňom, Žilina
Attendance: 1,699
Referee: Peter Ziemba

=== Slovak Cup ===
Win Loss Fixtures

15 August 2017 2R	MFK Bytča	1–8	FC Nitra	Bytča
	Gajdošík 81'	Report	Abrahám 4', 56', 60' *Fábry 8', 70' *Ngeyitala 28' (pen.), 53' *Steinhübel 44'	Stadium: Mestský štadión Bytča; Attendance: 800; Referee: Martin Ježík

13 September 2017 3R	Trenčianske Teplice	0–7	FC Nitra	Trenčianske Teplice
	Drienka (yellow card) 58' *Kopčan (yellow card) 83'	Report	Abrahám 12', 52', 61', 80' *Macho (yellow card) 64' *Steinhübel 75' *Vencl 82' *Ďurek 90'	Stadium: Trenčianske Teplice Stadium; Attendance: 328; Referee: Peter Cvengroš

27 September 2017 4R	MŠK Novohrad Lučenec	0–3	FC Nitra	Lučenec
	Husanik (yellow card) 58' *Kováč (yellow card) 84'	Report	Abrahám 30' *Šimončič 44' *Charizopulos 79'	Stadium: Mestský štadión Attendance: 1,850; Referee: Martin Ďurčo

18 October 2017 5R	Slovan Bratislava	3–1	FC Nitra	Bratislava
	Vittek 16', 65' *Rundić (yellow card) 59' *Niba 68' (o.g.) *Sekulić (yellow card) 69'	Report	Machovec (yellow card) 12' *Niba (yellow card) 43' *Balaj 84' (yellow card) 84' *Križan (yellow card) 89'	Stadium: Tehelné pole Attendance: 580; Referee: Patrik Hrčka

== Statistics ==
=== Goalscorers ===
Rank	No.	Pos.	Nat.	Player	First League	Slovak Cup	Total
1	25	FW	(Slovakia)	Patrik Abrahám	0	8	8
2	8	FW	(Slovakia)	Filip Balaj	6	1	7
3	24	FW	(Slovakia)	Tomáš Vestenický	6	0	6
4	6	MF	(Slovakia)	Tomáš Kóňa	5	0	5
4	14	MF	(Slovakia)	Miloš Šimončič	4	1	5
5	15	FW	(Slovakia)	Andrej Ivančík	3	0	3
5	66	MF	(Slovakia)	Márius Charizopulos	2	1	3
5	10	MF	(Slovakia)	Andrej Fábry	1	2	3
5	29	FW	(Slovakia)	Christián Steinhübel	1	2	3
6	7	MF	(France)	Aurélien Ngeyitala	0	2	2
7	26	DF	(Slovakia)	Pavol Farkaš	1	0	1
7	13	MF	(Slovakia)	René Kotrík	1	0	1
7	9	MF	(Slovakia)	Róbert Valenta	1	0	1
7	17	DF	(Slovakia)	Jaroslav Machovec	1	0	1
7	11	DF	(Slovakia)	Ján Chovanec	1	0	1
7	23	DF	(Czech Republic)	Ondřej Vencl	0	1	1
7	4	DF	(Slovakia)	Samuel Ďurek	0	1	1
Own goals					0	0	0
Totals					33	19	52
