= Le Giang =

Le Giang is a Vietnamese surname. Notable people with the surname include:

- Emil Le Giang (born 1991), Slovak footballer
- Patrik Le Giang (born 1992), Vietnamese footballer
