= Gajdoš =

Gajdoš (feminine: Gajdošová) is a Czech and Slovak surname, meaning 'bagpiper'. Notable people with the surname include:

- Artur Gajdoš (born 2004), Slovak footballer
- Jan Gajdoš (1903–1945), Czech gymnast
- Jarmila Wolfe, née Gajdošová (born 1987), Slovak-Australian tennis player
- Kazimír Gajdoš (1934–2016), Slovak footballer
- Miloslav Gajdoš (born 1948), Czech double bass player
- Peter Gajdoš (born 1959), Slovak general and politician
- Vratislav Gajdoš (born 1986), Slovak footballer

== See also ==
- Gaydos
