= Tvrdoň =

Tvrdoň is a surname. Notable people with the surname include:

- Marek Tvrdoň (born 1993), Slovak ice hockey player
- Marián Tvrdoň (born 1994), Slovak footballer
- Roman Tvrdoň (born 1981), Slovak ice hockey player
