= Marek Dubeň =

Slovak footballer

Personal information
- Full name: Marek Dubeň
- Date of birth: 11 July 1994 (age 32)
- Place of birth: Nitra, Slovakia
- Height: 1.85 m (6 ft 1 in)
- Position: Centre-back

Team information
- Current team: SC Höflein
- Number: 15

Youth career
- Nitra

Senior career*
Years	Team	Apps	(Gls)
2012	Nitra juniori		
2013–2015	Nitra	43	(1)
2016	Radomiak Radom	4	(0)
2017	Sereď	15	(0)
2017–2018	Lokomotíva Zvolen	18	(0)
2018–2020	Nitra	10	(0)
2020–2022	FC Mauerwerk	15	(0)
2022–	SC Höflein	36	(4)

International career
2012	Slovakia U18	1	(0)
2013	Slovakia U19	1	(0)
- * Club domestic league appearances and goals as of 11 July 2024

Marek Dubeň (born 11 July 1994) is a Slovak professional footballer who plays as a centre-back for Austrian club SC Höflein.

== Nitra ==
He made his professional debut for Nitra against Dukla Banská Bystrica, entering in as a substitute in place of Henrich Benčík on 20 April 2013.
