= Gaydos =

Gaydos is a surname. Notable people with the name include:

- John R. Gaydos (1943–2025), American Roman Catholic bishop
- Joseph M. Gaydos (1926–2015), American politician
- Kent Gaydos (born 1949), American football wide receiver
- Michael Gaydos, American comics artist
- Steven Gaydos, American screenwriter, songwriter and journalist
- Valerie Gaydos (born 1967), American politician

== See also ==
- Gajdoš
