= Marián Tvrdoň =

Slovak association footballer

Personal information
- Date of birth: 18 August 1994 (age 32)
- Place of birth: Nitra, Slovakia
- Height: 1.94 m (6 ft 4 in)
- Position: Goalkeeper

Team information
- Current team: Viktoria Plzeň
- Number: 13

Youth career
- 2009–2012: Nitra

Senior career*
Years	Team	Apps	(Gls)
2012–2014	Nitra	0	(0)
2012–2013	→ Zlaté Moravce (loan)	1	(0)
2013	→ Jelenec (loan)	15	(0)
2014–2021	Ústí nad Labem	93	(0)
2015	→ Chomutov (loan)	1	(0)
2018	→ Sokol Brozany (loan)	5	(0)
2021–	Viktoria Plzeň	15	(0)
2021–	Viktoria Plzeň B	23	(0)
- * Club domestic league appearances and goals as of 27 May 2026

Marián Tvrdoň (born 18 August 1994) is a Slovak professional footballer who plays as a goalkeeper for Czech club Viktoria Plzeň.

== Club career ==
Tvrdoň is a youth product of the Slovak side Nitra, and had a brief loan with the youth side of ViOn Zlaté Moravce. He began his senior career in the Czech Republic with FK Ústí nad Labem in 2014, and had several loans with lower-league Czech teams in his first couple of years. Returning to Ústí nad Labem, in the 2020–21 season, he was named goalkeeper of the season in the Czech National Football League. This earned him a move to the Czech First League with Viktoria Plzeň where he signed a 3-year contract. Normally acting as their backup goalkeeper, Tvrdoň was the starter for the club in a UEFA Champions League match against FC Bayern Munich on 4 October 2022.

== Honours ==
Viktoria Plzeň

- Czech First League: 2021–22
