= FK Nitra =

Slovak football club

- Full name: Futbalový klub Nitra
- Founded: 1945; 81 years ago as Dynamo Čermáň
- Ground: Štadión FK Nitra, Nitra
- Capacity: 1,000
- Owner: Futbalový klub Nitra o.z.
- Chairman: Henrich Benčík
- League: None (senior team withdrawn)
- 2025–26: 8. liga, 9th of 15
- Website: https://fknitra.sk/
Home colours	Away colours

Futbalový klub Nitra, commonly known as FK Nitra, is a football club based in the Klokočina district of Nitra, Slovakia. The club was founded in 1945 and plays its home matches at Štadión FK Nitra in the Klokočina district.

The club competed under the name ČFK Nitra until 2023. The club competed in the eighth tier of Slovak football as recently as the 2025–26 season. However, after the season, it withdrew its senior men's team from the competition and will continue to operate only with youth teams. The club competed in the fourth tier until the 2016–17 season.

== History ==
The club was founded in 1945 as Dynamo Čermáň. In 1978, it was renamed TJ Elitex Nitra, an abbreviation of Telovýchovná jednota Elitex Nitra. In 1985, the club changed its name again, becoming TJ Strojár Nitra, an abbreviation of Telovýchovná jednota Strojár Nitra. The word Strojár referred to the club's main sponsor, the Nitra-based engineering company Elitex. In 2002, the club was renamed ČFK Nitra, an abbreviation of Čermánsky futbalový klub Nitra. Čermáň is the name of a district of Nitra where the club was originally based.

In 2023, the club was renamed FK Nitra, an abbreviation of Futbalový klub Nitra. The change came in response to the bankruptcy proceedings against FC Nitra, the city's largest football club. At the time, FK Nitra intended to replace FC Nitra and therefore changed its name. However, the bankruptcy proceedings against FC Nitra were subsequently annulled by the Regional Court in Bratislava, meaning that FK Nitra's plans did not materialise. Following the 2025–26 season, the club withdrew from senior football for the first time in its history and has since competed exclusively in youth competitions.

== Events timeline ==
- 1945 – Founded as Dynamo Čermáň
- 1978 – Renamed TJ Elitex Nitra
- 1985 – Renamed TJ Strojár Nitra
- 2002 – Renamed ČFK Nitra
- 2023 – Renamed FK Nitra
