= Michal Jakubek =

Slovak footballer

Personal information
- Full name: Michal Jakubek
- Date of birth: 1 June 1990 (age 36)
- Place of birth: Czechoslovakia
- Height: 1.84 m (6 ft 0 in)
- Position: Forward

Team information
- Current team: Hodonín
- Number: 11

Youth career
- –2007: TJ Nafta Gbely
- 2006–2009: → Inter Bratislava (loan)
- 2007–2010: Liberec

Senior career*
Years	Team	Apps	(Gls)
2010–2018	Skalica	120	(23)
2019–	Hodonín	8	(2)
- * Club domestic league appearances and goals as of 21:54, 9 June 2019 (UTC)

Michal Jakubek (born 1 June 1990) is a professional Slovak footballer who currently plays for Moravian–Silesian Football League club FK Hodonín as a forward.

== Club career ==
In 2018, Jakubek left Skalica, making 120 appearances in which he scored 23 goals.

In 2019, Jakubek joined FK Hodonín.
