= Jan Shejbal =

Czech footballer

Personal information
- Date of birth: 20 April 1994 (age 32)
- Place of birth: Pardubice, Czech Republic
- Height: 1.87 m (6 ft 2 in)
- Position: Midfielder

Team information
- Current team: Chrudim
- Number: 3

Youth career
- 2000–2003: TJ Sokol Roveň
- 2003–2004: MFK Pardubice
- 2004–2007: Tesla Pardubice
- 2007–2009: Slovan Pardubice
- 2009–2012: FK Pardubice
- 2012–2013: Hradec Králové

Senior career*
Years	Team	Apps	(Gls)
2013–2017	Hradec Králové	49	(5)
2016	→ Nitra (loan)	16	(5)
2017	→ Pardubice (loan)	12	(0)
2018–2023	Teplice	72	(4)
2023–2025	Bohemians 1905	38	(2)
2025–	Chrudim	11	(2)

International career
2009–2010	Czech Republic U16	9	(0)
2011	Czech Republic U18	2	(0)
2013	Czech Republic U19	7	(0)
2014	Czech Republic U20	3	(1)
2014	Czech Republic U21	1	(0)
- * Club domestic league appearances and goals as of 28 May 2026

Jan Shejbal (born 20 April 1994) is a Czech professional footballer who plays for Chrudim.
