= Martin Boszorád =

Slovak footballer

Personal information
- Full name: Martin Boszorád
- Date of birth: 13 November 1989 (age 36)
- Place of birth: Nitra, Czechoslovakia
- Height: 1.80 m (5 ft 11 in)
- Position: Right back

Team information
- Current team: ASV Nickelsdorf
- Number: 16

Youth career
- Nitra

Senior career*
Years	Team	Apps	(Gls)
2008–2014	Nitra	95	(6)
2015–2016	Ružomberok	42	(2)
2016–2017	Zlaté Moravce – Vráble	23	(2)
2017	Győri ETO	3	(0)
2018–	ASV Nickelsdorf	0	(0)
- * Club domestic league appearances and goals as of 25 November 2017

Martin Boszorád (born 13 November 1989) is a Slovak football defender who currently plays for ASV Nickelsdorf in Austria.

== Ex-Clubs ==
Nitra U19 (2008/2009)

FC Nitra (2014/2015)

Ruzomberok (2016/2017)

Zlate Moravce (2017/2018)

ETO FC Győr (2017/2018)
