= Lipová, Nové Zámky District =

Village and municipality in Slovakia

Lipová Nyitramalomszeg
- Municipality
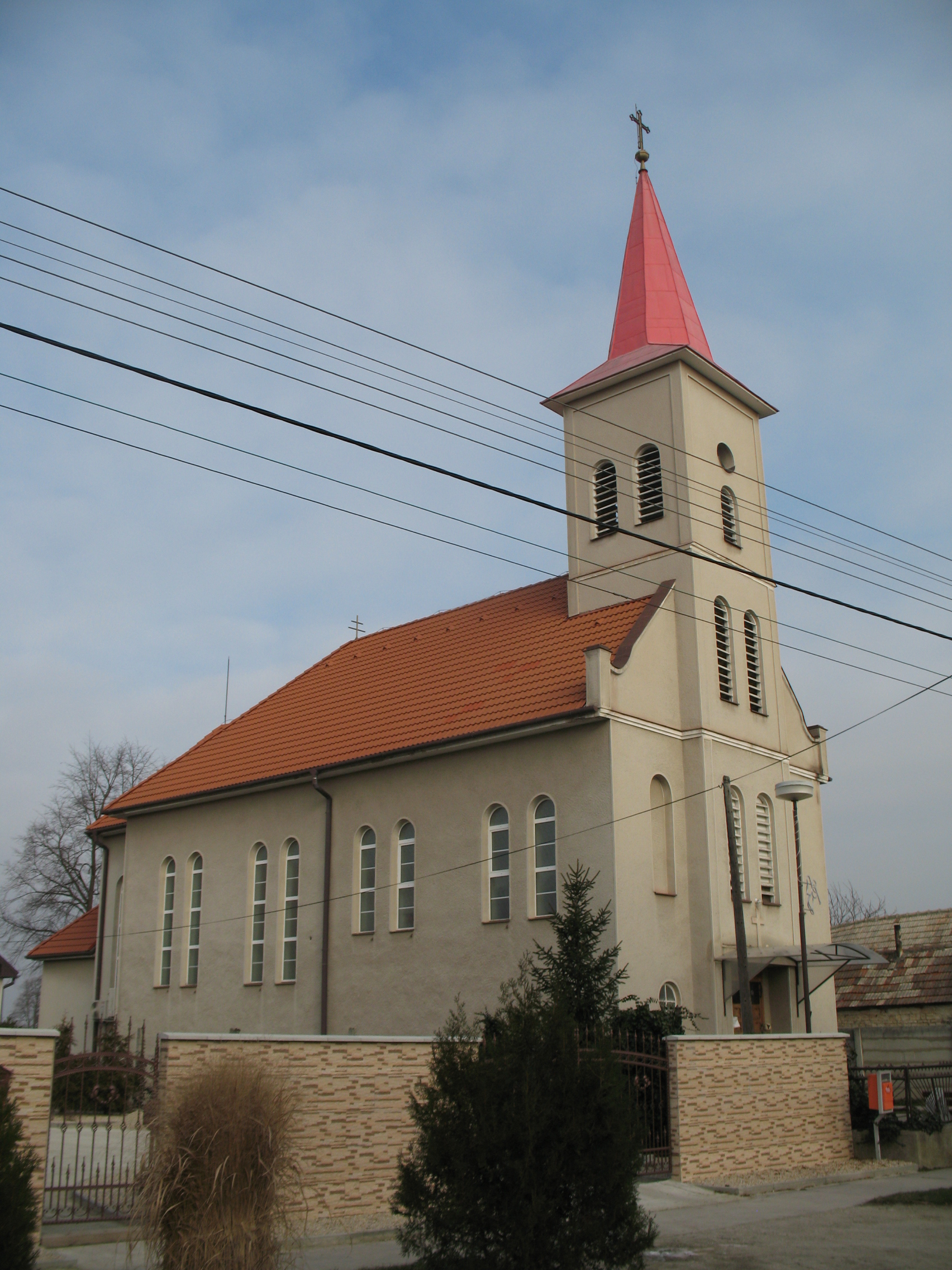

- Flag

- Location of Lipová in the Nitra Region Location of Lipová in Slovakia
- Coordinates: 48.11°N 18.18°E
- Country: Slovakia
- Region: Nitra Region
- District: Nové Zámky District
- First mentioned: 1156

Area
  - Total: 13.62 km^{2} (5.26 sq mi)
- Elevation: 124 m (407 ft)

Population (2025)
  - Total: 1,509
- Time zone: UTC+1 (CET)
  - Summer (DST): UTC+2 (CEST)
- Postal code: 941 02
- Area code: +421 35
- Vehicle registration plate (until 2022): NZ
- Website: www.lipova.eu/lipova/

Lipová (Hungarian: Nyitramalomszeg) is a village and municipality in the Nové Zámky District in the Nitra Region of south-west Slovakia.

== History ==
In historical records the village was first mentioned in 1156.

== Geography ==
The municipality lies at an altitude of 124 metres (407 ft) and covers an area of 13.62 km^{2} (5.26 sq mi) (2025).

== Population ==
Population statistic (10 years)
Year	1995	2005	2015	2025
Count	1621	1603	1542	1509
Difference		−1.11%	−3.80%	−2.14%

Population statistic
Year	2024	2025
Count	1519	1509
Difference		−0.65%

It has a population of 1509 people (31 December 2025).

=== Ethnicity ===
Census 2021 (1+ %)
Ethnicity	Number	Fraction
Slovak	1457	95.6%
Not found out	64	4.19%
Total	1524	

In year 2021 was 1524 people by ethnicity 1457 as Slovak, 64 as Not found out, 8 as Czech, 5 as Hungarian, 4 as Other, 2 as Russian and 1 as Croatian.

Note on population: The difference values of population numbers in the table "Population statistic" and in the sections "Ethnicity" & "Religion" is caused by the use of various statistical methods.

=== Religion ===
Census 2021 (1+ %)
Religion	Number	Fraction
Roman Catholic Church	1123	73.69%
None	297	19.49%
Not found out	57	3.74%
Evangelical Church	18	1.18%
Total	1524	

In year 2021 was 1524 people by religion 1123 from Roman Catholic Church, 297 from None, 57 from Not found out, 18 from Evangelical Church, 9 from Other, 5 from Ad hoc movements, 4 from Jewish community, 4 from Greek Catholic Church, 3 from Other and not ascertained christian church, 2 from Christian Congregations in Slovakia, 1 from Jehovah's Witnesses and 1 from Church of Jesus Christ of Latter-day Saints.

== Facilities ==
The village has a public library and a football pitch.

== In literature ==
Part of Mór Jókai's novel, "A mi lengyelünk" (Our Man from Poland), plays in the Lipová region.
