= Ján Chovanec =

Slovak footballer

Personal information
- Full name: Ján Chovanec
- Date of birth: 22 March 1984 (age 42)
- Place of birth: Lipová, Czechoslovakia
- Height: 1.78 m (5 ft 10 in)
- Positions: Left winger; left back

Team information
- Current team: OŠK Lipová

Youth career
- OŠK Lipová
- 2002–2004: Púchov

Senior career*
Years	Team	Apps	(Gls)
2004–2009	Púchov		
2007	→ Eldus Močenok (loan)		
2010–2012	Ružomberok	57	(1)
2012–2013	Teplice	21	(1)
2013–2015	Spartak Trnava	35	(4)
2014	→ Ruch Chorzów (loan)	9	(0)
2015–2016	Myjava	22	(0)
2016–2019	Nitra	81	(2)
2019–2020	OFK Branč		
2020	USV Münichreith	0	(0)
2020–2021	Elastik Bohdanovce		
2021–2024	SCU Wallsee		
2024–	OŠK Lipová		
- * Club domestic league appearances and goals as of 22 March 2024

Ján Chovanec (born 22 March 1984) is a Slovak footballer who plays as a midfielder for OŠK Lipová.

== Club career ==
He was signed by Trnava in July 2013 and made his debut for them against Senica on 13 July 2013.
