= Petr Kaspřák =

Czech footballer (born 1984)

Personal information
- Full name: Petr Kaspřák
- Date of birth: 17 January 1984 (age 42)
- Place of birth: Bohumín, Czechoslovakia
- Height: 1.84 m (6 ft 0 in)
- Position: Full-back

Team information
- Current team: 1. FC Polešovice

Youth career
- ŽD Bohumín
- Baník Ostrava

Senior career*
Years	Team	Apps	(Gls)
2004–2005	Pogoń Szczecin	6	(0)
2005–2006	Viktoria Žižkov	27	(2)
2006–2008	Slovácko	48	(4)
2008	AS Trenčín	23	(1)
2008–2009	Tur Turek	11	(0)
2009–2014	Nitra	102	(1)
2014–2017	SK Boršice		
2018–2020	SV Jauerling		
2020–2021	SK Krumvíř		
2022–	1. FC Polešovice		

International career
2001	Czech Republic U16	2	(0)
2001	Czech Republic U18	1	(0)
- * Club domestic league appearances and goals as of 6 January 2025

Petr Kaspřák (born 17 January 1984) is a Czech footballer who plays as a full-back for 1. FC Polešovice.
