= Peter Mičic =

Slovak footballer

Personal information
- Full name: Peter Mičic
- Date of birth: 30 April 1986 (age 40)
- Place of birth: Považská Bystrica, Czechoslovakia
- Height: 1.85 m (6 ft 1 in)
- Positions: Centre-back; left-back

Team information
- Current team: Púchov (youth coach)

Youth career
- 2004–2005: Púchov

Senior career*
Years	Team	Apps	(Gls)
2005–2009	Púchov	43	(11)
2009–2011	Dukla Prague	45	(2)
2011–2012	Polkowice	9	(1)
2012–2013	Nitra	35	(1)
2014–2018	Púchov		
2014	→ Zvolen (loan)	4	(0)

Managerial career
- Púchov (youth)
- * Club domestic league appearances and goals

Peter Mičic (born 30 April 1986) is a Slovak former professional footballer who played as a defender.

== Career ==
=== Club ===
In July 2011, he joined Polish club KS Polkowice. He previously played for Slovak club FK Púchov and Czech club FK Dukla Prague.
