= Ján Harbuľák =

Slovak footballer

Personal information
- Full name: Ján Harbuľák
- Date of birth: 15 November 1988 (age 37)
- Place of birth: Nitra, Czechoslovakia
- Height: 1.86 m (6 ft 1 in)
- Position: Defender

Team information
- Current team: SV Gols

Youth career
- Nitra

Senior career*
Years	Team	Apps	(Gls)
2008–2015	Nitra	87	(0)
2015–2017	Nitra B		
2017–	SV Gols		
- * Club domestic league appearances and goals

Ján Harbuľák (born 15 November 1988) is a Slovak football defender who plays for Austrian club SV Gols.
