= Stijepo Njire =

Croatian footballer

Personal information
- Full name: Stijepo Njire
- Date of birth: 14 March 1991 (age 35)
- Place of birth: Dubrovnik, SFR Yugoslavia
- Height: 1.86 m (6 ft 1 in)
- Position: Midfielder

Senior career*
Years	Team	Apps	(Gls)
–2013	Konavljanin		
2014	HNK Slaven Gruda		
2014	SV Donau	14	(11)
2015–2017	Znojmo	66	(11)
2018	Železiarne Podbrezová	11	(3)
- * Club domestic league appearances and goals as of 21 January 2019

Stijepo Njire (born 14 March 1991) is a Croatian retired footballer who played as a midfielder.

== Club career ==
He had a spell at Austrian fourth-tier side SV Donau in 2014.

=== FK Železiarne Podbrezová ===
Njire made his Fortuna Liga debut for Železiarne Podbrezová against Tatran Prešov on 18 February 2018.
