= Boris Turčák =

Slovak footballer

Personal information
- Date of birth: 21 February 1993 (age 33)
- Place of birth: Čadca, Slovakia
- Height: 1.80 m (5 ft 11 in)
- Position: Winger

Team information
- Current team: Inter Bratislava
- Number: 10

Youth career
- Slovan Bratislava

Senior career*
Years	Team	Apps	(Gls)
2010–2014	Slovan Bratislava	2	(0)
2011–2012	→ SFM Senec (loan)	17	(0)
2013	→ Nitra (loan)	27	(2)
2014	→ SFM Senec (loan)	13	(1)
2014–2015	Ružomberok	26	(3)
2015–2016	Sereď	10	(0)
2016	Universitatea Cluj	12	(3)
2016–2017	Pohronie	5	(1)
2017	→ Petržalka (loan)	10	(6)
2017–2020	Petržalka	61	(11)
2020–2021	Senica	13	(1)
2021–2022	Petržalka	24	(12)
2022–2023	Košice	30	(3)
2024	Komárno	13	(1)
2024-2026	Inter Bratislava	51	(5)

International career
- Slovakia U15
- Slovakia U16
- Slovakia U17
- Slovakia U18
2011	Slovakia U19	3	(0)
- * Club domestic league appearances and goals as of 25 May 2026

Boris Turčák (born 21 February 1993) is a Slovak footballer who plays as midfielder who plays for Inter Bratislava of 2. Liga.
