= Vladimir Forbs =

Bissau-Guinean footballer (born 1992)

Personal information
- Full name: Vladimir Soares Forbs
- Date of birth: 14 April 1992 (age 34)
- Place of birth: Guinea-Bissau
- Height: 1.75 m (5 ft 9 in)
- Position: Midfielder

Team information
- Current team: Louletano
- Number: 23

Youth career
- 2009–2011: Marítimo

Senior career*
Years	Team	Apps	(Gls)
2011–2012	Marítimo B	0	(0)
2013	Oeiras	4	(0)
2013	Osaka	7	(3)
2014	Nitra	7	(0)
2014–2015	Tirsense	15	(2)
2015–2016	Atlético CP	8	(4)
2016–2017	Praiense	18	(1)
2017–2018	Mafra	22	(0)
2018–2019	Praiense	29	(2)
2019–2020	GS Loures	10	(2)
2020–	Louletano	3	(0)
- * Club domestic league appearances and goals as of 21:12, 29 March 2020 (UTC)

Vladimir Soares Forbs (born 14 April 1992) is a Bissau-Guinean football midfielder who currently plays for Louletano in Portugal.
