= Tomáš Bagi =

Slovak footballer

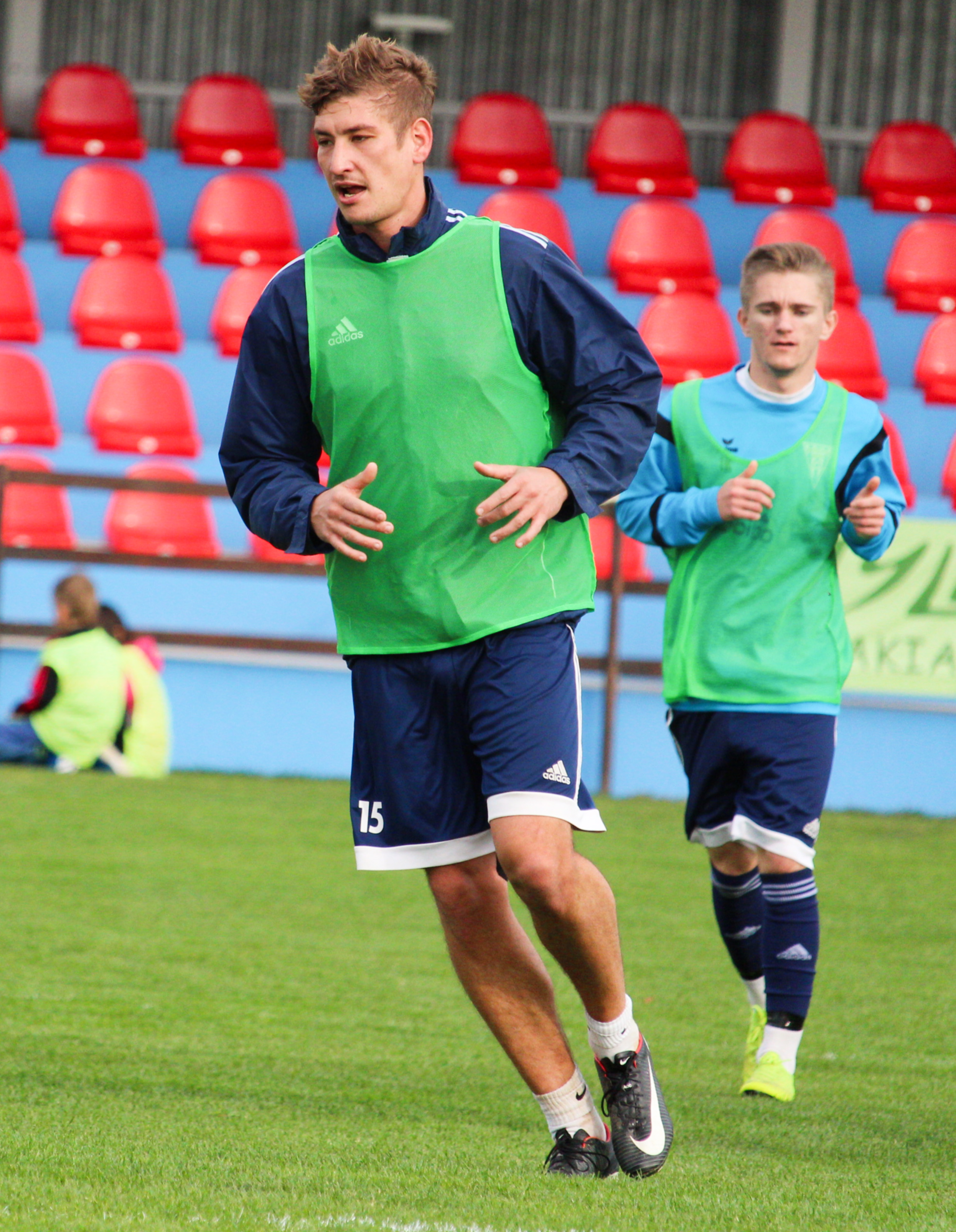

Personal information
- Full name: Tomáš Bagi
- Date of birth: 9 June 1991 (age 35)
- Place of birth: Bratislava, Czechoslovakia
- Height: 1.88 m (6 ft 2 in)
- Positions: Defensive midfielder; centre back

Team information
- Current team: TJ Slavoj Boleráz

Youth career
- Slovan Bratislava

Senior career*
Years	Team	Apps	(Gls)
2010–2015	Slovan Bratislava	12	(0)
2011	→ SFM Senec (loan)	9	(0)
2013	→ Nitra (loan)	8	(1)
2015	Banants	11	(1)
2015–2016	Iskra Borčice	15	(3)
2016–2017	Dukla Banská Bystrica	5	(0)
2017–	TJ Slavoj Boleráz		

International career
2009–2010	Slovakia U19	4	(0)
- * Club domestic league appearances and goals as of 28 February 2017

Tomáš Bagi (born 9 June 1991) is a Slovak football player who currently plays for TJ Slavoj Boleráz.

== Club career ==
Bagi started his career in the youth ranks of ŠK Slovan Bratislava. He made his debut for ŠK Slovan Bratislava against FK Dukla Banská Bystrica on 6 April 2010.
