= Jiří Böhm =

Czech footballer

Personal information
- Date of birth: 16 December 1987 (age 38)
- Place of birth: Czechoslovakia
- Height: 1.86 m (6 ft 1 in)
- Position: Forward

Senior career*
Years	Team	Apps	(Gls)
2007–2009	Baník Ostrava	0	(0)
2007	→ Dukla Prague (loan)	8	(0)
2008	→ Vysočina Jihlava (loan)	11	(0)
2011	Viktoria Žižkov	12	(3)
2012	Slavia Prague	9	(0)
2012–2013	Bohemians Praha	11	(1)
2013	Viktoria Žižkov		
2014	Nitra	10	(0)
2014–2015	Kolín	6	(0)
2015–2016	FK Chmel Blšany		
- * Club domestic league appearances and goals as of 7 January 2023

Jiří Böhm (born 16 December 1987) is a former professional Czech football player who most recently played for FK Chmel Blšany.
