= Golianovo =

Village and municipality in Slovakia

Golianovo Lapásgyarmat
- Municipality
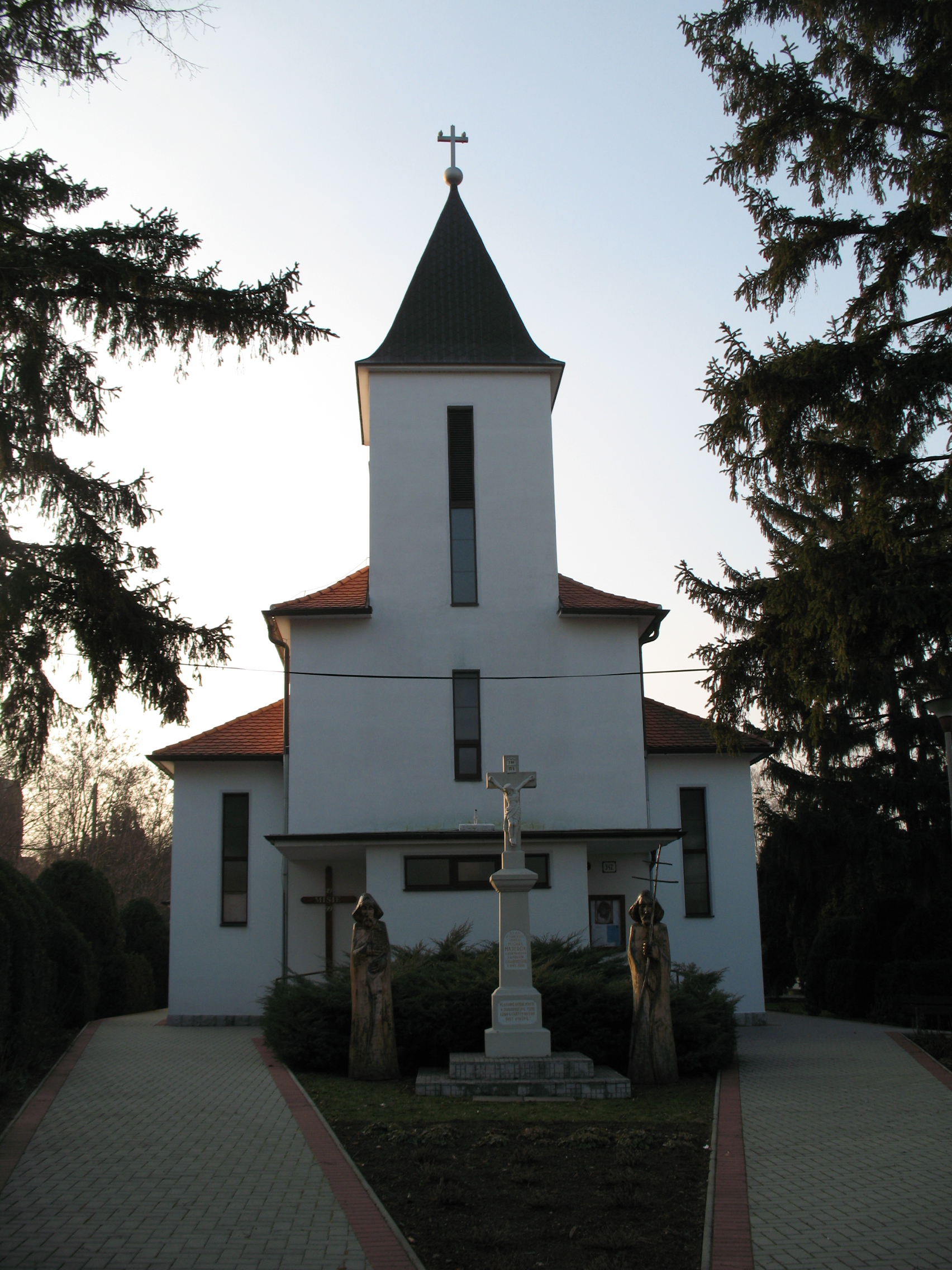

- Flag

- Location of Golianovo in the Nitra Region Location of Golianovo in Slovakia
- Coordinates: 48.27°N 18.20°E
- Country: Slovakia
- Region: Nitra Region
- District: Nitra District
- First mentioned: 1156

Area
  - Total: 10.70 km^{2} (4.13 sq mi)
- Elevation: 163 m (535 ft)

Population (2025)
  - Total: 2,031
- Time zone: UTC+1 (CET)
  - Summer (DST): UTC+2 (CEST)
- Postal code: 951 08
- Area code: +421 37
- Vehicle registration plate (until 2022): NR
- Website: www.golianovo.sk

Golianovo (1920–1927 Lapáš Ďarmoty, 1927–1938, 1945–1948 Lapášské Ďarmoty; Hungarian: Lapásgyarmat) is a village and municipality in the Nitra District in western central Slovakia, in the Nitra Region.

== History ==
In historical records the village was first mentioned in 1156.

== Geography ==
The municipality lies at an altitude of 163 metres (535 ft) and covers an area of 10.70 km^{2} (4.13 sq mi) (2025).

== Population ==
Population statistic (10 years)
Year	1995	2005	2015	2025
Count	1122	1251	1609	2031
Difference		+11.49%	+28.61%	+26.22%

Population statistic
Year	2024	2025
Count	2029	2031
Difference		+0.09%

It has a population of 2031 people (31 December 2025).

=== Ethnicity ===
Census 2021 (1+ %)
Ethnicity	Number	Fraction
Slovak	1829	96.67%
Not found out	49	2.58%
Hungarian	24	1.26%
Total	1892	

In year 2021 was 1892 people by ethnicity 1829 as Slovak, 49 as Not found out, 24 as Hungarian, 10 as Czech, 6 as Russian, 3 as Ukrainian, 3 as Polish, 2 as Serbian, 2 as Rusyn, 1 as German, 1 as Other and 1 as English.

Note on population: The difference values of population numbers in the table "Population statistic" and in the sections "Ethnicity" & "Religion" is caused by the use of various statistical methods.

=== Religion ===
Census 2021 (1+ %)
Religion	Number	Fraction
Roman Catholic Church	1434	75.79%
None	306	16.17%
Not found out	50	2.64%
Evangelical Church	35	1.85%
Greek Catholic Church	23	1.22%
Total	1892	

In year 2021 was 1892 people by religion 1434 from Roman Catholic Church, 306 from None, 50 from Not found out, 35 from Evangelical Church, 23 from Greek Catholic Church, 6 from Other, 5 from Eastern Orthodox Church, 4 from Calvinist Church, 4 from Paganism and natural spirituality, 4 from Christian Congregations in Slovakia, 4 from Church of the Brethren, 4 from Seventh-day Adventist Church, 3 from Other and not ascertained christian church, 3 from Buddhism, 3 from Ad hoc movements, 1 from Jehovah's Witnesses, 1 from Hinduism, 1 from United Methodist Church and 1 from Bahá'i Community.

== Facilities ==
The village has a public library a gym and football pitch.

== See also ==
- List of municipalities and towns in Slovakia

== Genealogical resources ==
The records for genealogical research are available at the state archive "Statny Archiv in Nitra, Slovakia"

- Roman Catholic church records (births/marriages/deaths): 1701-1900 (parish B)
- Lutheran church records (births/marriages/deaths): 1887-1954 (parish B)
