= Martin Kolesár =

Slovak footballer

Personal information
- Full name: Martin Kolesár
- Date of birth: 10 December 1997 (age 28)
- Place of birth: Trebišov, Slovakia
- Height: 1.85 m (6 ft 1 in)
- Position: Defender

Team information
- Current team: Slavoj Trebišov
- Number: 3

Youth career
- Slavoj Trebišov
- Zemplín Michalovce

Senior career*
Years	Team	Apps	(Gls)
2016	Veľké Revištia	12	(0)
2017–	Zemplín Michalovce	53	(0)
2017	→ Trebišov (loan)	10	(1)
2018–2019	→ Trebišov (loan)	17	(0)
2022–	→ Trebišov (loan)	8	(0)

International career
2014–2015	Slovakia U18	4	(0)
2015	Slovakia U19	1	(0)
- * Club domestic league appearances and goals as of 23 May 2023

Martin Kolesár (born 10 December 1997) is a Slovak footballer who currently plays for Slavoj Trebišov as a defender, on loan from Zemplín Michalovce.

== Club career ==
=== Zemplín Michalovce ===
Kolesár made his Fortuna Liga debut for Zemplín Michalovce on 12 March 2017 against AS Trenčín, in a 1:4 away defeat. Kolesár replaced Kristi Qose in the 80th minute.
