= Matúš Mikuš =

Slovak footballer

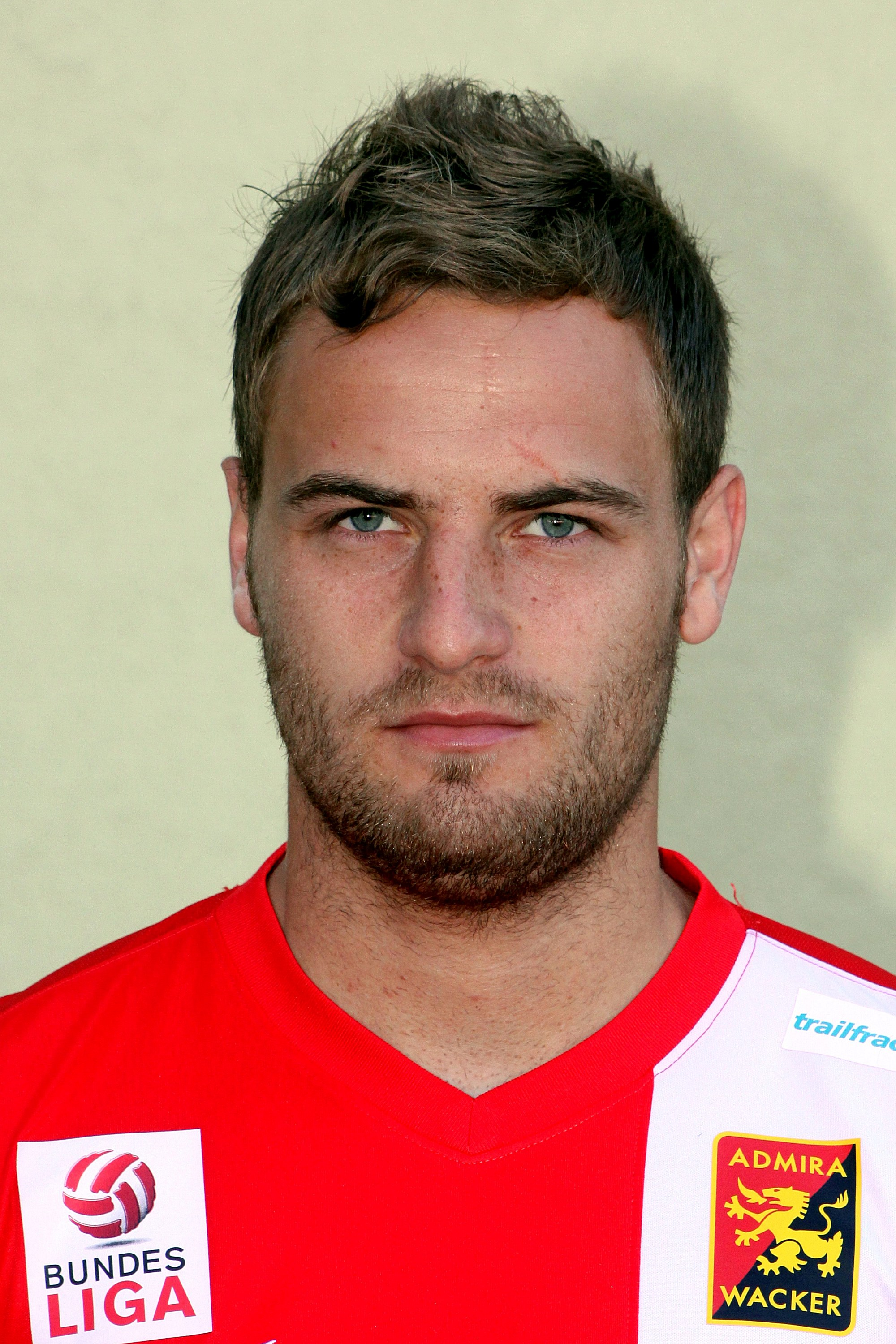

Personal information
- Full name: Matúš Mikuš
- Date of birth: 8 July 1991 (age 35)
- Place of birth: Topoľčany, Czechoslovakia
- Height: 1.80 m (5 ft 11 in)
- Position: Forward

Team information
- Current team: ASV Zurndorf

Youth career
- Nitra

Senior career*
Years	Team	Apps	(Gls)
2008–2012	Nitra	60	(10)
2013	Admira Wacker Mödling	4	(0)
2014	Nitra	12	(7)
2014–2016	Bohemians 1905	51	(7)
2017–2019	Železiarne Podbrezová	49	(5)
2019	Nitra	2	(0)
2020	Pohronie	5	(0)
2021–2023	SC/ESV Parndorf	57	(33)
2024–	ASV Zurndorf	0	(0)

International career
2010	Slovakia U19	4	(1)
2010–2011	Slovakia U21	8	(1)
- * Club domestic league appearances and goals as of 21:53, 23 January 2024 (UTC)

Matúš Mikuš (born 8 July 1991) is a Slovak football forward who plays for Austrian club ASV Zurndorf.

== Career ==
In January 2013, he signed a contract with the Austrian Bundesliga club Admira Wacker Mödling. He left them in December 2013.

=== FK Pohronie ===
Mikuš had signed with Pohronie at the end of February 2020. At the time, Pohronie was the last team of the Fortuna Liga table. He had signed the club as a free agent. Previously, during the autumn part of the season, he was featured in two fixtures of Nitra, who was ranked 11 of 12 for most of the season.

Mikuš made his debut for Pohronie in the first available fixture, on 1 March 2020, in a home fixture against Senica. Mikuš came on as a replacement for Roland Gerebenits in the 66th minute and played as a secondary striker. Despite multiple chances on both sides and partly owing to the difficult terrain, the game concluded in a goal-less tie, allowing the home side to equal Nitra in the table, achieving their 16th point in the season.

After the season, in which Pohronie managed to avoid relegation from the Fortuna Liga, Mikuš was let go from the club.

=== SC/ESV Parndorf ===
In 2021, Mikuš joined Austrian club SC/ESV Parndorf.
