= Filip Balaj =

Slovak footballer

Personal information
- Full name: Filip Balaj
- Date of birth: 2 August 1997 (age 29)
- Place of birth: Zlaté Moravce, Slovakia
- Height: 1.92 m (6 ft 4 in)
- Position: Forward

Team information
- Current team: Nitra

Youth career
- TJ AC NOVAN Nová Ves nad Žitavou
- Nitra

Senior career*
Years	Team	Apps	(Gls)
2014–2017	Nitra	70	(32)
2018–2020	Žilina	56	(7)
2020–2021	ViOn Zlaté Moravce	28	(16)
2021–2024	Cracovia	16	(1)
2022	Cracovia II	2	(0)
2023	→ Trinity Zlín (loan)	17	(3)
2023–2024	→ ViOn Zlaté Moravce (loan)	23	(1)
2024–2026	ViOn Zlaté Moravce	56	(17)
2026–	Nitra	0	(0)

International career
2015–2016	Slovakia U19	6	(1)
2016–2018	Slovakia U21	6	(1)
- * Club domestic league appearances and goals as of 17 May 2026

Filip Balaj (born 2 August 1997) is a Slovak professional footballer who plays as a forward for Nitra.

== Club career ==
=== FC Nitra ===
He made his Fortuna Liga debut for Nitra against Žilina on 22 July 2017. He played in the starting line-up, for 88 minutes, before being replaced by Márius Charizopulos. He scored game's sole winning goal, utilising the assist of Tomáš Kóňa.

== Honours ==
Individual

- Slovak Super Liga Player of the Month: October 2020
