= Emil Le Giang =

Slovak football striker (born 1991)

Personal information
- Full name: Emil Le Giang
- Date of birth: 26 February 1991 (age 35)
- Place of birth: Lučenec, Czechoslovakia
- Height: 1.79 m (5 ft 10 1/2 in)
- Positions: Midfielder; winger

Team information
- Current team: SC Union Wallsee

Youth career
- –2007: Fiľakovo
- 2007–2008: Nürnberg II
- 2009–2010: Žilina

Senior career*
Years	Team	Apps	(Gls)
2010–2011	Žilina B	27	(5)
2011–2012	Žilina	0	(0)
2011	→ Michalovce (loan)	4	(0)
2012	→ Rimavská Sobota (loan)	9	(4)
2012	Karviná	1	(0)
2013–2015	Fiľakovo	13	(12)
2013	→ Nitra (loan)	9	(0)
2013–2014	→ Makov (loan)		
2015–2020	Borčice	13	(1)
2020–	SC Union Wallsee	0	(0)

International career
2007	Slovakia U-16		
2007	Slovakia U-17		
- * Club domestic league appearances and goals as of 11 June 2015

Emil Le Giang (born 26 February 1991 in Lučenec) is a Slovak football striker who currently plays for Austrian club Union Wallsee. His younger brother Patrik is also footballer, who plays for MŠK Žilina. He is of Vietnamese descent.

== Club career ==
In July 2011, he joined Slovak club MFK Zemplín Michalovce on a one-year loan from MŠK Žilina. Emil made his debut for MFK Zemplín Michalovce against MFK Dubnica on 13 August 2011. In summer 2013, he joined to FC Nitra on loan from FTC Fiľakovo. On 28 September 2013, Emil returned to FTC Fiľakovo.

== See also ==
- List of Vietnam footballers born outside Vietnam
