= Vratislav Gajdoš =

Slovak footballer

Personal information
- Full name: Vratislav Gajdoš
- Date of birth: 13 January 1986 (age 40)
- Place of birth: Nitra, Czechoslovakia
- Height: 1.81 m (5 ft 11 1/2 in)
- Position: Midfielder

Team information
- Current team: FK FC Jelenec

Youth career
- Nitra

Senior career*
Years	Team	Apps	(Gls)
2004–2005	Slovan Bratislava		
2005–2008	Petržalka		
2008–2010	Banská Bystrica		
2011	Senica	11	(0)
2011–2013	Nitra	62	(9)
2014–	OFK Veľký Lapáš		
2023-	FK FC Jelenec		
- * Club domestic league appearances and goals as of 11 August 2023

Vratislav Gajdoš (born 13 January 1986) is a Slovak football midfielder who plays for FK FC Jelenec.
