= Márius Charizopulos =

Slovak footballer (born 1990)

Personal information
- Date of birth: 9 November 1990 (age 36)
- Place of birth: Nitra, Czechoslovakia
- Height: 1.80 m (5 ft 11 in)
- Position: Midfielder

Team information
- Current team: SC-ESV Parndorf 1919

Youth career
- Nitra
- Čermáňsky FK Nitra

Senior career*
Years	Team	Apps	(Gls)
–2009	Čermáňsky FK Nitra		
2010–2011	Spartak Vráble		
2012–2013	Slovan Duslo Šaľa	46	(3)
2014–2015	ViOn Zlaté Moravce	40	(5)
2015–2019	Nitra	85	(10)
2019–2020	Győri ETO	17	(0)
2020–2021	Spartak Myjava		
2021–	SC-ESV Parndorf 1919	21	(9)
- * Club domestic league appearances and goals as of 29 April 2022

Márius Charizopulos (born 9 November 1990) is a Slovak football midfielder who plays for Austrian club SC-ESV Parndorf 1919.

== Club career ==
=== Early career ===
Charizopulos began his football career at FC Nitra, from where he transferred to ČFK Nitra during the youth system, where he later worked his way up to the first team. In 2010, he transferred to FK Spartak Vráble. In the summer of 2012, he signed a contract with FK Slovan Duslo Šaľa.

=== Zlaté Moravce ===
In the winter transfer window of the 2013/14 season, Charizopulos left for FC ViOn Zlaté Moravce. He made his professional debut for Zlaté Moravce against Spartak Myjava on 1 April 2014, playing the last ten minutes of a 0–0 draw. Charizopulos scored his first goal for ViOn in the last match of the season, a 2–1 defeat against Myjava. In his time with Zlate Moravce, he scored 5 goals in 40 league matches.

=== FC Nitra ===
Charizopulos returned to FC Nitra in July 2015. After the 2016/17 season, he helped the team get promoted to the Slovak First Football League at the expense of the bankrupt club FC VSS Košice. He made his debut for Nitra in the first league in a 1–0 win against MŠK Žilina, coming on as a substitute in the 88th minute for Filip Balaj.

== Personal life ==
Charizopulos has a Greek origin because his grandfather was from Greece and he married his Slovak wife and they had three sons. Márius was born in Slovakia, to a father with Greek origin (Leonidas) and a Slovak mother.Márius's brother Nikolaos is also footballer who currently plays for FK Veľký Cetín. Márius' cousin Leonidas is a footballer, too.
