= Róbert Valenta =

Slovak footballer

Personal information
- Full name: Róbert Valenta
- Date of birth: 10 January 1990 (age 36)
- Place of birth: Šaľa, Czechoslovakia
- Height: 1.85 m (6 ft 1 in)
- Position: Winger

Youth career
- 1996–2002: FC Pata
- 2002–2006: Nitra
- 2007–2008: Sparta Praha

Senior career*
Years	Team	Apps	(Gls)
2007	Nitra	9	(0)
2009–2013	Sparta Prague II	14	(2)
2009–2010	→ Nitra (loan)	45	(2)
2011	→ Zbrojovka Brno (loan)	8	(2)
2011	→ Příbram (loan)	9	(0)
2012–2013	→ Příbram (loan)	10	(1)
2014	DAC 1904 Dunajská Streda	10	(0)
2014	ViOn Zlaté Moravce	16	(0)
2015–2019	Nitra	96	(9)
2019–2025	FC Pata	163	(100)

International career
2008–2009	Slovakia U-19	13	(2)
2010–2011	Slovakia U-21	6	(0)
- * Club domestic league appearances and goals as of 16:25, 6 June 2019 (UTC)

Róbert Valenta (born 10 January 1990) is a Slovak football midfielder.

== Career ==
Valenta started out playing football for FC Pata, the football club in the village where he grew up. He later played for FC Nitra, Sparta Prague B, Zbrojovka Brno, FK Příbram, DAC 1904 Dunajská Streda and ViOn Zlaté Moravce. On 5 March 2019, Valenta joined FC Pata (4th League), where he ended his football career in 2025.
