= Ondřej Vencl =

Czech footballer (born 1993)

Personal information
- Full name: Ondřej Vencl
- Date of birth: 7 November 1993 (age 33)
- Place of birth: Pardubice, Czech Republic
- Height: 1.88 m (6 ft 2 in)
- Position: Right-back

Team information
- Current team: MFK Chrudim
- Number: 25

Senior career*
Years	Team	Apps	(Gls)
2013–2016	Pardubice	77	(2)
2015	→ FK Kolín (loan)		
2016–2018	FC Nitra	35	(0)
2018–2019	SV Horn		
2019–	MFK Chrudim		
- * Club domestic league appearances and goals as of 18 July 2020

Ondřej Vencl (born 7 November 1993) is a Czech footballer who plays for MFK Chrudim as a defender.

== Club career ==
=== FC Nitra ===
Vencl made his professional debut for FC Nitra against FC ViOn Zlaté Moravce on 11 August 2017.
