= Andrej Ivančík =

Slovak footballer

Personal information
- Full name: Andrej Ivančík
- Date of birth: 25 May 1990 (age 36)
- Place of birth: Nitra, Czechoslovakia
- Height: 1.82 m (6 ft 0 in)
- Position: Midfielder

Team information
- Current team: Nitra
- Number: 15

Youth career
- Nitra

Senior career*
Years	Team	Apps	(Gls)
2011–	Nitra	121	(24)
2013	→ Slovan Duslo Šaľa (loan)	14	(3)
- * Club domestic league appearances and goals as of 19 January 2019

Andrej Ivančík (born 25 May 1990) is a Slovak football midfielder who currently plays for the Fortuna Liga club FC Nitra.
