= Marián Kolmokov =

Slovak footballer

Personal information
- Full name: Marián Kolmokov
- Date of birth: 23 March 1991 (age 35)
- Place of birth: Nitra, Czechoslovakia
- Height: 1.92 m (6 ft 3 1/2 in)
- Position: Centre back

Team information
- Current team: Družstevník Čermany

Youth career
- Nitra

Senior career*
Years	Team	Apps	(Gls)
2010–2017	Nitra	132	(5)
2014	→ Šaľa (loan)	13	(0)
2017–	Družstevník Čermany	15	(10)

International career
2009–2010	Slovakia U-19	8	(0)
2011–2012	Slovakia U-21	8	(1)
- * Club domestic league appearances and goals as of 20 November 2017

Marián Kolmokov (born 23 March 1991) is a Slovak football defender who currently plays for Družstevník Čermany.
