= Henrich Benčík =

Slovak footballer (born 1978)

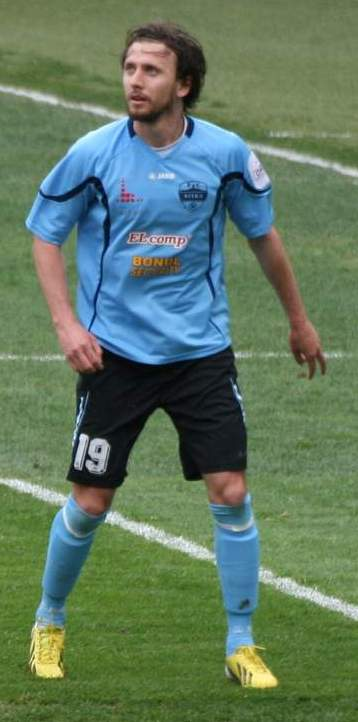
- Benčík in 2013

Personal information
- Date of birth: 4 October 1978 (age 48)
- Place of birth: Nitra, Czechoslovakia
- Height: 1.88 m (6 ft 2 in)
- Position: Forward

Senior career*
Years	Team	Apps	(Gls)
1997–1998	Nitra	4	(1)
1998–1999	Trenčín	3	(0)
1999–2000	Nitra	46	(2)
2000–2002	Petržalka	67	(21)
2002–2003	Denizlispor	28	(7)
2003	Teplice	13	(3)
2003–2004	LR Ahlen	14	(4)
2004–2006	1. FC Saarbrücken	61	(20)
2006–2008	SC Freiburg	49	(9)
2008–2009	FSV Frankfurt	21	(0)
2009–2011	VfL Osnabrück	28	(6)
2013	Nitra	12	(3)
2013–2014	Wacker Burghausen	28	(5)
2014–2015	Nitra	40	(7)
2016	Svätý Jur	2	(0)
Total		416	(88)

International career
2001–2003	Slovakia	11	(0)
- * Club domestic league appearances and goals

Henrich Benčík (born 4 October 1978) is a Slovak former professional footballer who played as a forward. He spent a large part of his career playing in Germany.

== Career ==
In winter 2013, he returned to hometown club FC Nitra.
