= Miloš Šimončič =

Slovak footballer

Personal information
- Full name: Miloš Šimončič
- Date of birth: 27 May 1987 (age 39)
- Place of birth: Nitra, Czechoslovakia
- Height: 1.85 m (6 ft 1 in)
- Position: Midfielder

Youth career
- Nitra

Senior career*
Years	Team	Apps	(Gls)
2005–2013	Nitra	169	(13)
2014–2016	Ritzing	62	(4)
2016–2019	Nitra	89	(13)
2020–????	Veľký Lapáš		
- * Club domestic league appearances and goals

Miloš Šimončič (born 27 May 1987) is a Slovak former footballer who played as a midfielder.

== Career ==
=== Club career ===
Šimončič played for Nitra, spending most of his career there. He also played for the Austrian lower division side of Ritzing.

His professional retirement was announced on 21 January 2020. He would continue to play for OFK 1948 Veľký Lapáš and still be a part of FC Nitra's organization.
