= René Kotrík =

Slovak footballer

Personal information
- Full name: René Kotrík
- Date of birth: 14 March 1996 (age 30)
- Place of birth: Bojnice, Slovakia
- Height: 1.87 m (6 ft 1 1/2 in)
- Position: Defensive midfielder

Team information
- Current team: FC Nitra
- Number: 13

Youth career
- –2011: TJ Družstevník Opatovce nad Nitrou
- 2011–2013: FC Nitra

Senior career*
Years	Team	Apps	(Gls)
2013–2018	FC Nitra	106	(2)
- * Club domestic league appearances and goals as of 19 January 2019

René Kotrík (born 14 March 1996) is a former Slovak football player, who played as a midfielder. He spent his entire professional career at FC Nitra. René was forced to retire in 2018, due to medical problems.

== Club career ==
=== Early career ===
Kotrík was born in Bojnice. He started playing football at TJ Opatovce nad Nitrou, where he later transferred to FK Prievidza.

=== Nitra and retirement ===
Kotrík made his professional debut for FC Nitra against FK DAC 1904 Dunajská Streda on 31 August 2013. In 2017, after a 2–1 loss against Spartak Trnava, he was injured after tearing his muscle. He scored his first top flight goal in a 1–1 draw against AS Trenčín, scoring in the 36th minute. In 2018, at the age of only 22, Kotrík retired from professional football due to a recurring injury in the knee. His contact with the club would be terminated by mutual agreement. After his retirement, he went to work at a sawmill in Lehot pod Vtáčníkom and played for Baník in the fourth league.

== International career ==
While in the Nitra academy, Kotrík represented the Slovakia national under-21 football team.
