= 2025–26 MFK Zemplín Michalovce season =

Zemplín Michalovce
2025–26 season
- Manager: Anton Šoltis
- Stadium: Mestský futbalový štadión
- Slovak First Football League: 5th
- Slovak Cup: Round of 16
- Top goalscorer: League: Hugo Ahl (10); All: Hugo Ahl (11)
- Highest home attendance: 4,286 v Slovan Bratislava (24 August 2025, Slovak First Football League)
- Lowest home attendance: 735 v Ružomberok (23 November 2025, Slovak First Football League)
- Average home league attendance: 1,995
- Biggest win: 10–0 v Sobrance-Sobranecko (Away, 10 September 2025, Slovak Cup)
- Biggest defeat: 0–4 v Podbrezová (Home, 6 December 2025, Slovak First Football League)
Home colours	Away colours

The 2025–26 season was Mestský futbalový klub Zemplín Michalovce's 11th consecutive season in the Slovak First Football League. In addition to the domestic league, Zemplín Michalovce participated in the Slovak Cup.

== Squad ==
As of 14 March 2026 Note: Flags indicate national team as defined under FIFA eligibility rules; some limited exceptions apply. Players may hold more than one non-FIFA nationality.

No.	Pos.	Nation	Player
1	GK	SVK	Patrik Lukáč
4	MF	NGR	Abdul Zubairu
5	DF	GRE	Polydefkis Volanakis
7	MF	ENG	Kai Brosnan
9	FW	POL	Tomasz Walczak
11	FW	MEX	José Ángel López
12	DF	GUI	Franck Bahi
14	MF	ENG	Kido Taylor-Hart
15	DF	SRB	Lazar Žaknić
16	GK	SVK	Adam Jakubech
18	FW	GRE	Vasilios Theofanopoulos
20	FW	UKR	Luka Lemishko
21	MF	ESP	Samuel Ramos
22	MF	SVK	Patrik Danek

No.	Pos.	Nation	Player
25	DF	SVK	Lukáš Pauschek
26	DF	GEO	Tornike Dzotsenidze
27	DF	SVK	Matej Čurma
31	MF	EST	Nikita Mihhailov
33	DF	GRE	Christos Makrygiannis
40	FW	SWE	Hugo Ahl
42	MF	GRE	Orestis Kalemi
51	MF	SVK	Stanislav Danko
61	MF	SVK	Matúš Begala
66	MF	SVK	Martin Bednár
77	DF	KOR	Park Tae-rang
80	MF	ENG	Ben Cottrell
―	DF	GRE	Dimos Papakonstantinou

== Transfers ==
=== Summer ===
In: Note: Flags indicate national team as defined under FIFA eligibility rules; some limited exceptions apply. Players may hold more than one non-FIFA nationality.

No.	Pos.	Nation	Player
—	MF	SWE	Hugo Ahl (from 1. FC Tatran Presov)
—	DF	SVK	Lukáš Pauschek (from Free Agent)
—	FW	LTU	Gytis Paulauskas (from (Ukraine) FC Kolos Kovalivka)

Out: Note: Flags indicate national team as defined under FIFA eligibility rules; some limited exceptions apply. Players may hold more than one non-FIFA nationality.

No.	Pos.	Nation	Player
—	MF	GRE	Alexandros Kyziridis (to (Scotland) Heart of Midlothian F.C.)
—	DF	UKR	Denys Taraduda (to FC Spartak Trnava)
—	FW	SVK	Matúš Marcin (to FK Železiarne Podbrezová)
—	MF	SVK	Igor Žofčák (Retired)
—	FW	SVK	Adam Žulevič (to (Italy) Genoa CFC)
—	MF	HUN	Artúr Musák (to (Czech Republic) FC Baník Ostrava)

=== Winter ===
In: Note: Flags indicate national team as defined under FIFA eligibility rules; some limited exceptions apply. Players may hold more than one non-FIFA nationality.

No.	Pos.	Nation	Player
—	FW	POL	Tomasz Walczak (from (Poland) Raków Częstochowa)

Out: Note: Flags indicate national team as defined under FIFA eligibility rules; some limited exceptions apply. Players may hold more than one non-FIFA nationality.

No.	Pos.	Nation	Player
—	FW	LTU	Gytis Paulauskas (to (South Korea) Jeju SK FC)

== Competitions ==
=== Overview ===
Competition	First match	Last match	Starting round	Final position	Record							
Competition	First match	Last match	Starting round	Final position	Pld	W	D	L	GF	GA	GD	Win %
Slovak First Football League	26 July 2025	16 May 2026	Matchday 1	5th	32	13	5	14	44	52	−8	40.63
Slovak Cup	10 September 2025	3 December 2025	Second round	Round of 16	4	3	0	1	16	4	+12	75.00
Total					36	16	5	15	60	56	+4	44.44

Source: Competitions

=== Slovak First Football League ===
==== Regular season ====
===== League table =====
Pos	Team	Pld	W	D	L	GF	GA	GD	Pts	Qualification
3	Žilina	22	11	7	4	45	27	+18	40	Qualification for the championship group
4	Spartak Trnava	22	11	4	7	35	28	+7	37	Qualification for the championship group
5	Podbrezová	22	11	3	8	46	29	+17	36	Qualification for the championship group
6	Zemplín Michalovce	22	8	5	9	32	36	−4	29	Qualification for the championship group
7	Ružomberok	22	6	7	9	24	34	−10	25	Qualification for the relegation group
8	Trenčín	22	7	3	12	18	37	−19	24 (Note: Ranked by head-to-head points: Trenčín 6, Košice 0.)	Qualification for the relegation group
9	Košice	22	7	3	12	35	42	−7	24	Qualification for the relegation group

Source: Niké liga (in Slovak)
Rules for classification: 1) Points; 2) Head-to-head points; 3) Head-to-head goal difference; 4) Head-to-head away goals scored; 5) Play-off.

===== Results summary =====
Overall								Home						Away					
Pld	W	D	L	GF	GA	GD	Pts	W	D	L	GF	GA	GD	W	D	L	GF	GA	GD
22	8	5	9	32	36	−4	29	4	2	5	18	21	−3	4	3	4	14	15	−1

Source: Niké liga

===== Results by round =====
Round	1	2	3	4	5	6	7	8	9	10	11	12	13	14	15	16	17	18	19	20	21	22
Ground	A	H	H	A	H	A	H	A	H	H	A	H	A	A	H	A	H	A	H	A	A	H
Result	D	W	L	W	D	D	L	W	W	W	L	L	D	L	W	L	L	W	D	L	W	L
Position	7	3	7	6	6	6	6	5	5	5	5	5	5	5	5	5	6	5	6	6	6	6
Points	1	4	4	7	8	9	9	12	15	18	18	18	19	19	22	22	22	25	26	26	29	29

Source: Worldfootball
A = Away; H = Home; W = Win; D = Draw; L = Loss

===== Matches =====
26 July 2025 1	DAC Dunajská Streda	1–1	Zemplín Michalovce	Dunajská Streda
18:00 CEST (UTC+2)	Đukanović 67'	Report	Cottrell 39'; Dzotsenidze (yellow card) 51'; Bednár (yellow card) 87'; Zubairu (yellow card) 90+5'	Stadium: MOL Aréna; Attendance: 4,075; Referee: Erik Gemzický; Assistant referees: Martin Vitko, Rastislav Kuba

2 August 2025 2	Zemplín Michalovce	3–1	Komárno	Michalovce
18:00 CEST (UTC+2)	Paulauskas 9'; Cottrell 59'; Ahl 88'; Zubairu (yellow card) 90'	Report	Šmehyl 21' (pen.); Németh (yellow card) 72'	Stadium: Mestský futbalový štadión Attendance: 1,584; Referee: Igor Valent; Assistant referees: Dávid Bobko, Juraj Halíček

9 August 2025 3	Zemplín Michalovce	2–4	Žilina	Michalovce
18:00 CEST (UTC+2)	Bednár (yellow card) 45'; Paulauskas 57'; Ramos 76'	Report	Faško 15'; Bari 28'; Pauschek 44' (o.g.); Kaprálik 45'; Sanusi (yellow card) 67' (yellow-red card) 84'	Stadium: Mestský futbalový štadión Attendance: 2,738; Referee: Filip Glova; Assistant referees: Peter Bednár, Mário Roszbeck

16 August 2025 4	Ružomberok	0–1	Zemplín Michalovce	Ružomberok
18:00 CEST (UTC+2)		Report	Bednár 42'; Cottrell (yellow card) 89'; Taylor-Hart (yellow card) 90'	Stadium: Štadión pod Čebraťom; Attendance: 868; Referee: Michal Očenáš; Assistant referees: Adam Jekkel, Tobiáš Pacák

24 August 2025 5	Zemplín Michalovce	1–1	Slovan Bratislava	Michalovce
19:00 CEST (UTC+2)	Musák 62', (yellow card) 71'; Paulauskas (yellow card) 83'; François (yellow card) 90'	Report	Mak 27'; Lichý (yellow card) 87'	Stadium: Mestský futbalový štadión Attendance: 4,286; Referee: Peter Ziemba; Assistant referees: Matej Zemko, Pavel Jánošík

30 August 2025 6	Podbrezová	2–2	Zemplín Michalovce	Podbrezová
20:30 CEST (UTC+2)	Havrylenko 44'; Smékal 56'; Mielke (yellow card) 65'; Paraj (yellow card) 72'	Report	Paulauskas 26'; Ahl 53'; Brosnan (yellow card) 79'	Stadium: ZELPO Aréna; Attendance: 527; Referee: Lukáš Dzivjak; Assistant referees: Branislav Hancko, Matej Hrebeňár

14 September 2025 7	Zemplín Michalovce	1–2	Tatran Prešov	Michalovce
17:00 CEST (UTC+2)	Zubairu (yellow card) 15'; Park (yellow card) 25'; Pauschek (yellow card) 31'; Čurma (yellow card) 40'; Ramos 66'; Dzotsenidze (yellow card) 90'	Report	Souček 10'; Regáli 19' (pen.), (yellow card) 20'; Šimko (yellow card) 28'; Sagna (yellow card) 81'; Masaryk (yellow card) 89'; Bajza (yellow card) 90'	Stadium: Mestský futbalový štadión Attendance: 2,896; Referee: Bálint Kišš; Assistant referees: Dušan Štofik, Patrik Kmec

21 September 2025 8	Spartak Trnava	0–1	Zemplín Michalovce	Trnava
19:00 CEST (UTC+2)	Procházka (yellow card) 5'; Koštrna (yellow card) 35'; Sabo (yellow card) 90'	Report	Ramos 21', (yellow card) 57'; López (yellow card) 35'; Cottrell (yellow card) 51' (yellow-red card) 87'; Brosnan (yellow card) 62'; Taylor-Hart (yellow card) 68'; Park (yellow card) 90'	Stadium: Anton Malatinský Stadium; Attendance: 5,379; Referee: Filip Glova; Assistant referees: Tobiáš Pacák, Tomáš Vorel

27 September 2025 9	Zemplín Michalovce	2–0	Skalica	Michalovce
18:00 CEST (UTC+2)	Brosnan 23'; Taylor-Hart 32'; Bahi (yellow card) 89'	Report		Stadium: Mestský futbalový štadión Attendance: 1,173; Referee: Boris Marhefka; Assistant referees: Martin Vitko, Patrik Kmec

4 October 2025 10	Zemplín Michalovce	2–0	Trenčín	Michalovce
18:00 CEST (UTC+2)	Ramos 27'; Brosnan 28'; Zubairu (yellow card) 70'; Begala (yellow card) 90'	Report	Baždarić (yellow card) 69'; Katić (yellow card) 85'	Stadium: Mestský futbalový štadión Attendance: 1,208; Referee: Boris Benedik; Assistant referees: Tomáš Vorel, Rastislav Kuba

19 October 2025 11	Košice	3–2	Zemplín Michalovce	Košice
15:30 CEST (UTC+2)	Jones 68', (yellow card) 74'; Krivák (yellow card) 74'; Gallovič 77'; Miljanić 87'; Kružliak (yellow card) 90'	Report	Bednár (yellow card) 14'; Dzotsenidze 34', (yellow card) 90'; Cottrell 53'	Stadium: Košická futbalová aréna Attendance: 5,076; Referee: Boris Marhefka; Assistant referees: Andrej Hrmo, Pavel Jánošík

25 October 2025 12	Zemplín Michalovce	2–4	DAC Dunajská Streda	Michalovce
15:30 CEST (UTC+2)	Cottrell 20'; Paulauskas 45'; Begala (yellow card) 75'	Report	Sylla (yellow card) 6'; Méndez (yellow card) 41'; Redzic (yellow card) 68'; Ramadan 70', (yellow card) 70'; Đukanović (yellow card) 77', (goal) 89' (pen.)	Stadium: Mestský futbalový štadión Attendance: 1,153; Referee: Matej Choreň; Assistant referees: Tomáš Straka, Juraj Halíček

2 November 2025 13	Komárno	1–1	Zemplín Michalovce	Zlaté Moravce
15:30 CET (UTC+1)	Kiss (yellow card) 56' (yellow-red card) 62'; Bayemi 90' (pen.)	Report	Ramos 63' (pen.); Cottrell (yellow card) 76'	Stadium: ViOn Aréna; Attendance: 280; Referee: Erik Gemzický; Assistant referees: Adam Jekkel, Martin Vitko

8 November 2025 14	Žilina	2–0	Zemplín Michalovce	Žilina
18:00 CET (UTC+1)	Ďatko 25'; Adang 59'; Bari (yellow card) 66'	Report	Čurma (yellow card) 10'; François (yellow card) 85'	Stadium: Štadión pod Dubňom; Attendance: 1,671; Referee: Boris Marhefka; Assistant referees: Matej Zemko, Jakub Košecký

23 November 2025 15	Zemplín Michalovce	4–2	Ružomberok	Michalovce
15:30 CET (UTC+1)	Ramos 16'; Paulauskas (yellow card) 45', (goal) 46'; Ahl 57'; Taylor-Hart 88'	Report	Endl 29'; Fila (yellow card) 51'; Ramos 76' (o.g.)	Stadium: Mestský futbalový štadión Attendance: 735; Referee: Filip Glova; Assistant referees: Daniel Poláček, Peter Bednár

30 November 2025 16	Slovan Bratislava	3–2	Zemplín Michalovce	Bratislava
15:30 CET (UTC+1)	Kashia 68'; Gajdoš (yellow card) 84'; Marcelli (yellow card) 87'; Tolić 90+2', 90+5', (yellow card) 90+6'	Report	Ahl 54'; Čurma (red card) 61'; Paulauskas 86'; Brosnan (yellow card) 90+2'	Stadium: Tehelné pole Attendance: 3,689; Referee: Lukáš Dzivjak; Assistant referees: Jakub Košecký, Dávid Bobko

6 December 2025 17	Zemplín Michalovce	0–4	Podbrezová	Michalovce
15:30 CET (UTC+1)	Paulauskas (red card) 21'; Ramos (yellow card) 45'; Pauschek (yellow card) 62'	Report	Galčík 38', 90'; Havrylenko (yellow card) 45'; Luka (yellow card) 57'; Palumets 69', (yellow card) 78'; Šiler 80'; Paraj (yellow card) 81'	Stadium: Mestský futbalový štadión Attendance: 815; Referee: Marián Ruc; Assistant referees: Adam Jekkel, Tomáš Straka

13 December 2025 18	Tatran Prešov	0–1	Zemplín Michalovce	Prešov
18:00 CET (UTC+1)	Šimko (yellow card) 31'; Sagna (yellow card) 62'	Report	López (yellow card) 27'; Ahl 81'; Ramos (yellow card) 89'; Dzotsenidze (yellow card) 90'	Stadium: Futbal Tatran Arena; Attendance: 6,007; Referee: Michal Očenáš; Assistant referees: Juraj Halíček, Pavel Jánošík

8 February 2026 19	Zemplín Michalovce	1–1	Spartak Trnava	Michalovce
18:00 CET (UTC+1)	Cottrell (yellow card) 17'; Shimamura (yellow card) 58'; Ramos 63' (pen.)	Report	Kudlička 7', (yellow card) 51'; Paur (yellow card) 23'	Stadium: Mestský futbalový štadión Attendance: 1,238; Referee: Erik Gemzický; Assistant referees: Daniel Poláček, Peter Čajka

14 February 2026 20	Skalica	2–1	Zemplín Michalovce	Skalica
15:30 CET (UTC+1)	Potočný 14', (yellow card) 28' (yellow-red card) 58'; Šuver (yellow card) 35'; Pudhorocký 47'; Mášik (yellow card) 86'	Report	Zubairu (yellow card) 13'; Danek 67'; Cottrell (yellow card) 90'	Stadium: Mestský štadión Skalica; Attendance: 312; Referee: Filip Glova; Assistant referees: František Ferenc, Dávid Bobko

21 February 2026 21	Trenčín	1–2	Zemplín Michalovce	Trenčín
15:30 CET (UTC+1)	Pavek (yellow card) 58'; Soares 84' (pen.); Doesburg (yellow card) 90'	Report	Begala (yellow card) 22'; Ramos (yellow card) 52'; Čurma (yellow card) 64'; Ahl 75', 85'; Dzotsenidze (yellow card) 90'; Bednár (yellow card) 90'	Stadium: Štadión Sihoť; Attendance: 686; Referee: Bálint Kišš; Assistant referees: Adam Jekkel, Simeon Vass

28 February 2026 22	Zemplín Michalovce	0–2	Košice	Michalovce
15:30 CET (UTC+1)	Bahi (yellow card) 74'; Kalemi (yellow card) 90'	Report	Perišić 4'; Kružliak (yellow card) 8'; Rehuš 21'; Kóša (yellow card) 36'	Stadium: Mestský futbalový štadión Attendance: 2,049; Referee: Peter Ziemba; Assistant referees: Andrej Hrmo, Dávid Bobko

==== Championship group ====
===== League table =====
Pos	Team	Pld	W	D	L	GF	GA	GD	Pts	Qualification	SLO	DAC	TRN	ŽIL	ZMI	POD
1	Slovan Bratislava (C)	32	21	5	6	62	37	+25	68	Qualification for the Champions League second qualifying round (Note: Slovan Bratislava was promoted to the Champions League second qualifying round as one of the two champions with the highest coefficient in Champions League first qualifying round, due to Champions League re-balancing.)	—	1–0	2–2	0–1	0–2	2–0
2	DAC Dunajská Streda	32	17	7	8	55	34	+21	58	Qualification for the Conference League second qualifying round	0–3	—	3–0	3–1	3–0	2–1
3	Spartak Trnava	32	17	5	10	51	37	+14	56	Qualification for the Conference League second qualifying round	0–1	2–1	—	1–0	3–0	4–1
4	Žilina	32	15	7	10	59	41	+18	52	Qualification for the Europa League first qualifying round (Note: Žilina qualified for the Europa League first qualifying round as the 2025–26 Slovak Cup winners.)	0–1	3–1	0–1	—	3–2	0–2
5	Zemplín Michalovce	32	13	5	14	44	52	−8	44		1–3	2–1	1–0	2–1	—	1–2
6	Podbrezová	32	13	3	16	55	51	+4	42		1–2	1–2	0–3	1–5	0–1	—

Source: Niké liga (in Slovak)
Legend: Blue = home team win; Yellow = draw; Red = away team win.
Rules for classification: 1) Points; 2) Points in regular season; 3) Head-to-head points in regular season; 4) Head-to-head goal difference in regular season; 5) Head-to-head goals scored in regular season; 6) Head-to-head away goals scored in regular season (if two teams tied); 7) Goal difference; 8) Goals scored; 9) Fair play ranking; 10) Drawing of lots.
(C) Champions

===== Results summary =====
Overall								Home						Away					
Pld	W	D	L	GF	GA	GD	Pts	W	D	L	GF	GA	GD	W	D	L	GF	GA	GD
10	5	0	5	12	16	−4	15	3	0	2	7	7	0	2	0	3	5	9	−4

Source: Worldfootball

===== Results by round =====
Round	23	24	25	26	27	28	29	30	31	32
Ground	H	A	H	H	A	A	H	A	H	A
Result	L	W	W	W	L	L	L	L	W	W
Position	6	6	6	5	5	5	6	6	5	5
Points	29	32	35	38	38	38	38	38	41	44

Source: Worldfootball
A = Away; H = Home; W = Win; D = Draw; L = Loss

===== Matches =====
7 March 2026 23	Zemplín Michalovce	1–3	Slovan Bratislava	Michalovce
15:30 CET (UTC+1)	López 66'; Dzotsenidze (yellow card) 73'	Report	Barseghyan 4'; Šporar 45' (pen.), 75'; Kashia (yellow card) 48'	Stadium: Mestský futbalový štadión Attendance: 3,487; Referee: Boris Marhefka; Assistant referees: Pavel Jánošík, Peter Čajka

14 March 2026 24	Podbrezová	0–1	Zemplín Michalovce	Podbrezová
15:30 CET (UTC+1)	Kováčik (yellow card) 30'; Lampreht (yellow card) 47'; Šiler (yellow card) 48'; Silagadze (yellow card) 75'	Report	Čurma (yellow card) 3'; Volanakis (yellow card) 26'; Park 69'; Bednár (yellow card) 75'	Stadium: ZELPO Aréna; Attendance: 737; Referee: Jaroslav Sučka; Assistant referees: Andrej Hrmo, Jakub Košecký

21 March 2026 25	Zemplín Michalovce	1–0	Spartak Trnava	Michalovce
15:30 CET (UTC+1)	Ahl 41'; Kalemi (yellow card) 43'; Park (yellow card) 73'; Volanakis (yellow card) 90'; Dzotsenidze (yellow card) 90'	Report	Stojsavljević (yellow card) 90'; Sabo (red card) 90'	Stadium: Mestský futbalový štadión Attendance: 2,106; Referee: Filip Glova; Assistant referees: Daniel Poláček, Patrik Kmec

4 April 2026 26	Zemplín Michalovce	2–1	Žilina	Michalovce
15:30 CEST (UTC+2)	Dzotsenidze (yellow card) 15'; Lemishko (yellow card) 52'; Cottrell 69', 87'; Jakubech (yellow card) 90'	Report	Bari (yellow card) 29'; Ďatko 53'; Badžgoň (yellow card) 90'	Stadium: Mestský futbalový štadión Attendance: 2,483; Referee: Martin Dohál; Assistant referees: Peter Bednár, Jakub Košecký

12 April 2026 27	DAC Dunajská Streda	3–0	Zemplín Michalovce	Dunajská Streda
18:00 CEST (UTC+2)	Udvaros (yellow card) 26'; Kmeť 68'; Dzotsenidze 73' (o.g.); Gueye 87'; Kapanadze (yellow card) 89'	Report	Dzotsenidze (yellow card) 37'	Stadium: MOL Aréna; Attendance: 3,819; Referee: Marián Ruc; Assistant referees: Martin Vitko, Juraj Halíček

18 April 2026 28	Spartak Trnava	3–0	Zemplín Michalovce	Trnava
15:30 CEST (UTC+2)	Khorkheli 10', 15'; Gong 30'; Metsoko (yellow card) 42'; Stojsavljević (yellow card) 71'	Report		Stadium: Anton Malatinský Stadium; Attendance: 3,854; Referee: Martin Dohál; Assistant referees: Jakub Košecký, Peter Čajka

25 April 2026 29	Zemplín Michalovce	1–2	Podbrezová	Michalovce
18:00 CEST (UTC+2)	Volanakis (yellow card) 22', (goal) 47'; Kalemi (yellow card) 90'	Report	Galčík 15'; Silagadze (yellow card) 38'; Palumets (yellow card) 42'; Šiler 54'; Luka (yellow card) 83'	Stadium: Mestský futbalový štadión Attendance: 1,542; Referee: Boris Benedik; Assistant referees: Martin Vitko, Michal Železňák

5 May 2026 30	Žilina	3–2	Zemplín Michalovce	Žilina
18:00 CEST (UTC+2)	Bzdyl 5'; Narimanidze 18'; Kóša 74'	Report	Taylor-Hart 4', (yellow card) 33'; Ahl 10'	Stadium: Štadión pod Dubňom; Attendance: 1,049; Referee: Filip Glova; Assistant referees: Tobiáš Pacák, Matej Hrebeňár

9 May 2026 31	Zemplín Michalovce	2–1	DAC Dunajská Streda	Michalovce
18:00 CEST (UTC+2)	Volanakis (yellow card) 33'; Park (yellow card) 46'; Ahl 80'; Taylor-Hart 86'	Report	Kacharaba (yellow card) 47'; Gueye 54'	Stadium: Mestský futbalový štadión Attendance: 2,426; Referee: Matej Choreň; Assistant referees: Matej Zemko, Juraj Halíček

16 May 2026 32	Slovan Bratislava	0–2	Zemplín Michalovce	Bratislava
17:00 CEST (UTC+2)	Ihnatenko (yellow card) 85'	Report	Theofanopoulos 46'; Cottrell 62', (yellow card) 81'	Stadium: Tehelné pole Attendance: 11,650; Referee: Michal Očenáš; Assistant referees: Milan Štrbo, Juraj Halíček

=== Slovak Cup ===
10 September 2025 Second round	Sobrance-Sobranecko	0–10	Zemplín Michalovce	Sobrance
16:00 CEST (UTC+2)	Lukačko (yellow card) 44'	Report	Taylor-Hart 3', 7'; López 11', 25'; Čurma 20'; Ramos 27'; Bahi (yellow card) 31'; Shimamura 37', 50'; Ahl (yellow card) 85', (goal) 88'	Stadium: MFK - Sobrance; Attendance: 950; Referee: Jakub Eperješi; Assistant referees: Matej Hrebeňár, Samuel Horváth

8 October 2025 Third round	Snina	0–3	Zemplín Michalovce	Snina
15:00 CEST (UTC+2)		Report	Theofanopoulos 15'; Bahi 27', 53'; Park (yellow card) 37'	Stadium: Futbalový štadión Attendance: 524; Referee: Jaroslav Sučka; Assistant referees: Matej Hrebeňár, Marek Cisko

29 October 2025 Fourth round	Bardejov	1–3	Zemplín Michalovce	Bardejov
13:30 CET (UTC+1)	Toubé 44'; Keresteš (yellow card) 85'; Čikoš (yellow card) 90' (not on pitch)	Report	Lemishko 5'; Danko 59'; François (yellow card) 71'; Makeľ 90' (o.g.)	Stadium: Mestský štadión Bardejov; Attendance: 678; Referee: Peter Ziemba; Assistant referees: Tobiáš Pacák, Dávid Bereš

3 December 2025 Round of 16	DAC Dunajská Streda	3–0	Zemplín Michalovce	Dunajská Streda
17:30 CET (UTC+1)	Redzic 43', 87'; Ramadan 80'	Report	Dzotsenidze (yellow card) 71'	Stadium: MOL Aréna; Attendance: 1,932; Referee: Boris Marhefka; Assistant referees: Peter Čajka, Rastislav Kuba; Fourth official: Erik Gemzický
