= 2025–26 FC DAC 1904 Dunajská Streda season =

DAC Dunajská Streda
2025–26 season
- Manager: Branislav Fodrek
- Stadium: MOL Aréna
- Slovak First Football League: 2nd
- Slovak Cup: Quarter-finals
- Top goalscorer: League: Ammar Ramadan (11); All: Ammar Ramadan (13)
- Highest home attendance: 9,301 v Slovan Bratislava (7 February 2026, Slovak First Football League)
- Lowest home attendance: 1,932 v Zemplín Michalovce (3 December 2025, Slovak Cup)
- Average home league attendance: 4,801
- Biggest win: 4–0 v Jelka (Away, 20 August 2025, Slovak Cup)
- Biggest defeat: 0–4 v Košice (Away, 4 March 2026, Slovak Cup)
Home colours	Away colours

The 2025–26 season was FC DAC 1904 Dunajská Streda's 13th consecutive season in the Slovak First Football League. In addition to the domestic league, the club participated in the Slovak Cup.

== Squad ==
As of 13 February 2026

Note: Flags indicate national team as defined under FIFA eligibility rules; some limited exceptions apply. Players may hold more than one non-FIFA nationality.

No.	Pos.	Nation	Player
1	GK	BRA	Filipe
5	MF	SVK	Karol Blaško
7	FW	MNE	Viktor Đukanović (on loan from Hammarby)
9	MF	AUT	Andreas Gruber
10	MF	SYR	Ammar Ramadan
11	FW	SEN	Abdoulaye Gueye
13	GK	GER	Jan-Christoph Bartels
14	FW	GAM	Pa Assan Corr
17	DF	CIV	Julien Bationo
18	DF	ESP	Alex Méndez
19	FW	SEN	Alioune Sylla
20	DF	BFA	Rachid Sande Barro
21	DF	SVK	Matúš Kmeť (on loan from Minnesota United)
22	DF	GEO	Tsotne Kapanadze
24	MF	SVK	Christián Herc

No.	Pos.	Nation	Player
26	DF	SVK	Filip Blažek
29	FW	GEO	Giorgi Gagua
33	DF	UKR	Taras Kacharaba (captain)
36	MF	SVK	Nathan Udvaros
38	MF	SVK	Martin Jenčuš
39	MF	SVK	Adam Lábo
41	GK	SRB	Aleksandar Popović
44	MF	TOG	Samsondin Ouro
46	FW	SVK	Matej Trusa
49	DF	BRA	Rhyan Modesto
68	MF	HUN	Máté Tuboly
81	DF	SVN	Klemen Nemanič
90	GK	SVK	Attila Németh
99	FW	SVN	Nino Kukovec

== Transfers ==
=== Summer ===
In: Note: Flags indicate national team as defined under FIFA eligibility rules; some limited exceptions apply. Players may hold more than one non-FIFA nationality.

No.	Pos.	Nation	Player
—	FW	AUT	Andreas Gruber (from FK Austria Wien)
81	DF	SVN	Klemen Nemanič (from (Slovenia) NK Celje)
—	FW	SEN	Abdoulaye Gueye (from (Latvia) SK Super Nova)
—	FW	GEO	Giorgi Gagua (from (Croatia) NK Istra 1961)
—	FW	GAM	Pa Assan Corr (from (Estonia) Paide Linnameeskond)
—	DF	CIV	Julien Bationo (from (Armenia) FC Alashkert)

Out: Note: Flags indicate national team as defined under FIFA eligibility rules; some limited exceptions apply. Players may hold more than one non-FIFA nationality.

No.	Pos.	Nation	Player
—	DF	BRA	Mateus Brunetti (Released and joined (Japan) Shimizu S-Pulse)
—	MF	SVK	Milan Dimun (Released and joined FC Košice)
—	DF	CGO	Yhoan Andzouana (to (Turkey) Konyaspor)
—	FW	GRE	Giannis Niarchos (to (Poland) Wisła Płock)
—	MF	GAM	Mahmudu Bajo (to (Serbia) Red Star Belgrade)
—	MF	HUN	Levente Bősze (to (Italy) Como U19)

=== Winter ===
In: Note: Flags indicate national team as defined under FIFA eligibility rules; some limited exceptions apply. Players may hold more than one non-FIFA nationality.

No.	Pos.	Nation	Player
—	DF	SVK	Matúš Kmeť (on loan from (United States) Minnesota United FC)
—	FW	SVN	Niko Kukovec (from (Slovenia) NK Radomlje)
—	GK	SVN	Aljaž Ivačič (from Free Agent)

Out: Note: Flags indicate national team as defined under FIFA eligibility rules; some limited exceptions apply. Players may hold more than one non-FIFA nationality.

No.	Pos.	Nation	Player
—	DF	COL	Pablo Ortiz (to (Czech Republic) FC Baník Ostrava)
—	FW	HUN	Damir Redzic (to (Austria) RB Salzburg)
—	DF	FRA	Romaric Yapi (to (Finland) FC Lahti)

== Competitions ==
=== Overview ===
Competition	First match	Last match	Starting round	Final position	Record							
Competition	First match	Last match	Starting round	Final position	Pld	W	D	L	GF	GA	GD	Win %
Slovak First Football League	26 July 2025	16 May 2026	Matchday 1	2nd	32	17	7	8	55	34	+21	53.13
Slovak Cup	20 August 2025	4 March 2026	Second round	Quarter-finals	5	4	0	1	10	4	+6	80.00
Total					37	21	7	9	65	38	+27	56.76

Source: Competitions

=== Slovak First Football League ===
==== Regular season ====
===== League table =====
Pos	Team	Pld	W	D	L	GF	GA	GD	Pts	Qualification
1	Slovan Bratislava	22	14	4	4	47	30	+17	46	Qualification for the championship group
2	DAC Dunajská Streda	22	12	7	3	39	20	+19	43	Qualification for the championship group
3	Žilina	22	11	7	4	45	27	+18	40	Qualification for the championship group
4	Spartak Trnava	22	11	4	7	35	28	+7	37	Qualification for the championship group
5	Podbrezová	22	11	3	8	46	29	+17	36	Qualification for the championship group
6	Zemplín Michalovce	22	8	5	9	32	36	−4	29	Qualification for the championship group

Source: Niké liga (in Slovak)
Rules for classification: 1) Points; 2) Head-to-head points; 3) Head-to-head goal difference; 4) Head-to-head away goals scored; 5) Play-off.

===== Results summary =====
Overall								Home						Away					
Pld	W	D	L	GF	GA	GD	Pts	W	D	L	GF	GA	GD	W	D	L	GF	GA	GD
22	12	7	3	39	20	+19	43	6	3	2	20	12	+8	6	4	1	19	8	+11

Source: Niké liga

===== Results by round =====
Round	1	2	3	4	5	6	7	8	9	10	11	12	13	14	15	16	17	18	19	20	21	22
Ground	H	A	H	A	H	A	H	A	H	A	H	A	H	A	H	A	H	A	H	A	H	A
Result	D	W	W	D	W	W	W	L	D	D	L	W	W	W	D	W	W	W	L	D	W	D
Position	6	4	3	4	2	2	2	3	3	3	4	4	4	3	3	3	2	2	2	2	2	2
Points	1	4	7	8	11	14	17	17	18	19	19	22	25	28	29	32	35	38	38	39	42	43

Source: Worldfootball
A = Away; H = Home; W = Win; D = Draw; L = Loss

===== Matches =====
26 July 2025 1	DAC Dunajská Streda	1–1	Zemplín Michalovce	Dunajská Streda
18:00 CEST (UTC+2)	Đukanović 67'	Report	Cottrell 39'; Dzotsenidze (yellow card) 51'; Bednár (yellow card) 87'; Zubairu (yellow card) 90+5'	Stadium: MOL Aréna; Attendance: 4,075; Referee: Erik Gemzický; Assistant referees: Martin Vitko, Rastislav Kuba

9 August 2025 3	DAC Dunajská Streda	2–0	Ružomberok	Dunajská Streda
20:30 CEST (UTC+2)	Ramadan 45+1' (pen.); Redzic 83'	Report	Mojžiš (red card) 32'; Domonkos (yellow card) 32'	Stadium: MOL Aréna; Attendance: 3,868; Referee: Marián Ruc; Assistant referees: Dušan Štofik, Martin Vitko

16 August 2025 4	Tatran Prešov	0–0	DAC Dunajská Streda	Prešov
20:30 CEST (UTC+2)	Souček (yellow card) 54'; Regáli (yellow card) 79'; Balodis (yellow card) 82'; Šimko (yellow card) 87'	Report	Kacharaba (yellow card) 59'; Đukanović (yellow card) 63'; Alex Méndez (yellow card) 85'; Udvaros (yellow card) 90'	Stadium: Futbal Tatran Arena; Attendance: 6,254; Referee: Martin Dohál; Assistant referees: František Ferenc, Rastislav Kuba

23 August 2025 5	DAC Dunajská Streda	4–1	Trenčín	Dunajská Streda
20:30 CEST (UTC+2)	Tuboly (yellow card) 25'; Nemanič 38'; Đukanović 45'; Udvaros (yellow card) 60'; Redzic 74'; Gruber 84'	Report	Križan (red card) 33'; Khan (yellow card) 36'; Bessilé 54'; Sani (yellow card) 58'; Yakubu (yellow card) 87'	Stadium: MOL Aréna; Attendance: 3,993; Referee: Matej Choreň; Assistant referees: Daniel Poláček, Tomáš Vorel

31 August 2025 6	Spartak Trnava	0–3	DAC Dunajská Streda	Trnava
19:00 CEST (UTC+2)	Kratochvíl (yellow card) 35'; Mikovič (yellow card) 37'; Kudlička (yellow card) 71'; Ďuriš (yellow card) 76'; Procházka (yellow card) 87'	Report	Ramadan 15', 62'; Popović (yellow card) 35'; Blažek (yellow card) 38'; Redzic 65'; Ouro (yellow card) 86'; Gagua (yellow card) 87'	Stadium: Anton Malatinský Stadium; Attendance: 9,362; Referee: Michal Smolák; Assistant referees: Ján Pozor, František Ferenc

14 September 2025 7	DAC Dunajská Streda	2–0	Podbrezová	Dunajská Streda
19:00 CEST (UTC+2)	Đukanović 9'; Redzic 30'; Méndez (yellow card) 34'; Gueye (yellow card) 90'	Report	Chyla (yellow card) 61'; Galčík (yellow card) 87'; Jurička (yellow card) 90'	Stadium: MOL Aréna; Attendance: 4,682; Referee: Ivan Kružliak; Assistant referees: Ján Pozor, Ákos Juhos

20 September 2025 8	Slovan Bratislava	3–2	DAC Dunajská Streda	Bratislava
20:30 CEST (UTC+2)	Barseghyan 9'; Tolić 48', (yellow card) 90'; Blackman 77'	Report	Ramadan 41'; Đukanović 64'	Stadium: Tehelné pole Attendance: 9,487; Referee: Peter Kráľovič; Assistant referees: Branislav Hancko, Daniel Poláček

27 September 2025 9	DAC Dunajská Streda	1–1	Komárno	Dunajská Streda
18:00 CEST (UTC+2)	Kacharaba (yellow card) 48'; Đukanović 77' (pen.)	Report	Žák 7'; Kiss (yellow card) 47'	Stadium: MOL Aréna; Attendance: 5,650; Referee: Ivan Kružliak; Assistant referees: Branislav Hancko, Ján Pozor

1 October 2025 2	Košice	0–2	DAC Dunajská Streda	Košice
18:00 CEST (UTC+2)		Report	Tuboly (yellow card) 21'; Đukanović 41'; Herc 44'	Stadium: Košická futbalová aréna Attendance: 2,182; Referee: Lukáš Dzivjak; Assistant referees: Daniel Poláček, Tomáš Straka

5 October 2025 10	Skalica	1–1	DAC Dunajská Streda	Skalica
17:00 CEST (UTC+2)	Šimko (yellow card) 59'; Bariš 63' (pen.); Guinari (red card) 69'; Gaži (yellow card) 90+2'; Daniel (yellow card) 90+2'; Junas (yellow card) 90+5'	Report	Modesto (yellow card) 1'; Đukanović 71' (pen.)	Stadium: Mestský štadión Skalica; Attendance: 661; Referee: Marián Ruc; Assistant referees: Matej Zemko, Tomáš Straka

19 October 2025 11	DAC Dunajská Streda	1–2	Žilina	Dunajská Streda
18:00 CEST (UTC+2)	Modesto (yellow card) 39'; Sylla 62', (yellow card) 77'; Gruber (yellow card) 84'	Report	Roginić 34', 45+2', (yellow card) 61'; Bari (yellow card) 58'; Kopásek (yellow card) 82'	Stadium: MOL Aréna; Attendance: 4,768; Referee: Lukáš Dzivjak; Assistant referees: František Ferenc, Dávid Bobko

25 October 2025 12	Zemplín Michalovce	2–4	DAC Dunajská Streda	Michalovce
15:30 CEST (UTC+2)	Cottrell 20'; Paulauskas 45'; Begala (yellow card) 75'	Report	Sylla (yellow card) 6'; Méndez (yellow card) 41'; Redzic (yellow card) 68'; Ramadan 70', (yellow card) 70'; Đukanović (yellow card) 77', (goal) 89' (pen.)	Stadium: Mestský futbalový štadión Attendance: 1,153; Referee: Matej Choreň; Assistant referees: Tomáš Straka, Juraj Halíček

1 November 2025 13	DAC Dunajská Streda	3–1	Košice	Dunajská Streda
18:00 CET (UTC+1)	Redzic 31'; Tuboly (yellow card) 45'; Gagua 62'; Ramadan 90'	Report	Perišić (yellow card) 21'; Magda (yellow card) 29' (yellow-red card) 37'; Dimun 42'; Kružliak (yellow card) 63'	Stadium: MOL Aréna; Attendance: 4,085; Referee: Michal Očenáš; Assistant referees: František Ferenc, Dávid Bobko

8 November 2025 14	Ružomberok	0–1	DAC Dunajská Streda	Ružomberok
15:30 CET (UTC+1)	Selecký (yellow card) 21' (yellow-red card) 44'; Bačík (yellow card) 56'	Report	Redzic 3'; Udvaros (yellow card) 20'; Kapanadze (yellow card) 34'; Alex Méndez (yellow card) 52'	Stadium: Štadión pod Čebraťom; Attendance: 1,155; Referee: Lukáš Dzivjak; Assistant referees: Patrik Kmec, Dávid Bobko

23 November 2025 15	DAC Dunajská Streda	0–0	Tatran Prešov	Dunajská Streda
18:00 CET (UTC+1)	Redzic (red card) 90+2'	Report	Simon (yellow card) 34'; Morim (yellow card) 90+4'	Stadium: MOL Aréna; Attendance: 3,549; Referee: Matej Choreň; Assistant referees: Dušan Štofik, Mário Roszbeck

29 November 2025 16	Trenčín	0–3	DAC Dunajská Streda	Trenčín
18:00 CET (UTC+1)		Report	Corr 21'; Ouro 57'; Ramadan 65'	Stadium: Štadión Sihoť; Attendance: 744; Referee: Michal Smolák; Assistant referees: Milan Štrbo, Ákos Juhos

7 December 2025 17	DAC Dunajská Streda	3–1	Spartak Trnava	Dunajská Streda
18:00 CET (UTC+1)	Twardzik 15' (o.g.); Ramadan 20'; Modesto (yellow card) 24'; Sylla 47'; Corr (yellow card) 90'; Nemanič (yellow card) 90'; Bationo (yellow card) 90'; Kacharaba (red card) 90'	Report	Kudlička (yellow card) 33'; Mikovič (yellow card) 40'; Kratochvíl (yellow card) 53'; Sabo 80' (pen.); Skrbo (yellow card) 85'; Stojsavljević (red card) 90'; Paur (yellow card) 90'; Koštrna (yellow card) 90'	Stadium: MOL Aréna; Attendance: 5,184; Referee: Ivan Kružliak; Assistant referees: Tobiáš Pacák, Rastislav Kuba

13 December 2025 18	Podbrezová	0–1	DAC Dunajská Streda	Podbrezová
15:30 CET (UTC+1)	Paraj (yellow card) 24'	Report	Modesto (yellow card) 25'; Sylla 30'; Nemanič (yellow card) 62'	Stadium: ZELPO Aréna; Attendance: 511; Referee: Michal Smolák; Assistant referees: Branislav Hancko, Ján Pozor

7 February 2026 19	DAC Dunajská Streda	0–3	Slovan Bratislava	Dunajská Streda
18:00 CET (UTC+1)	Bartels (yellow card) 42'; Bationo (red card) 48'	Report	Gajdoš 12', 53'; Marković (yellow card) 15'; Kukharevych 43' (pen.); Pokorný (yellow card) 57'; Cruz (yellow card) 75'; Janković (yellow card) 88'; Ibrahim (yellow card) 90'	Stadium: MOL Aréna; Attendance: 9,301; Referee: Michal Očenáš; Assistant referees: Adam Jekkel, Tobiáš Pacák

15 February 2026 20	Komárno	2–2	DAC Dunajská Streda	Zlaté Moravce
15:30 CET (UTC+1)	Ganbayar (yellow card) 29'; Kacharaba 56' (o.g.); Žák 69' (pen.); Jones (yellow card) 90+3'	Report	Tuboly (yellow card) 8', (goal) 32'; Đukanović 14'; Kacharaba (yellow card) 55'; Nemanič (yellow card) 71'; Udvaros (yellow card) 90+1'	Stadium: ViOn Aréna; Attendance: 640; Referee: Matej Choreň; Assistant referees: Andrej Hrmo, Rastislav Kuba

21 February 2026 21	DAC Dunajská Streda	3–2	Skalica	Dunajská Streda
15:30 CET (UTC+1)	Ramadan 6', 9', 13', (yellow card) 90+2'	Report	Smejkal 75'; Ravas 89'	Stadium: MOL Aréna; Attendance: 3,515; Referee: Boris Benedik; Assistant referees: Pavel Jánošík, Patrik Kmec

28 February 2026 22	Žilina	0–0	DAC Dunajská Streda	Žilina
15:30 CET (UTC+1)	Kaša (yellow card) 42'; Adang (yellow card) 77'	Report	Blažek (yellow card) 25'; Kmeť (yellow card) 75'	Stadium: Štadión pod Dubňom; Attendance: 2,083; Referee: Ivan Kružliak; Assistant referees: Dušan Štofik, Jakub Košecký

==== Championship group ====
===== League table =====
Pos	Team	Pld	W	D	L	GF	GA	GD	Pts	Qualification	SLO	DAC	TRN	ŽIL	ZMI	POD
1	Slovan Bratislava (C)	32	21	5	6	62	37	+25	68	Qualification for the Champions League second qualifying round (Note: Slovan Bratislava was promoted to the Champions League second qualifying round as one of the two champions with the highest coefficient in Champions League first qualifying round, via Champions League re-balancing.)	—	1–0	2–2	0–1	0–2	2–0
2	DAC Dunajská Streda	32	17	7	8	55	34	+21	58	Qualification for the Conference League second qualifying round	0–3	—	3–0	3–1	3–0	2–1
3	Spartak Trnava	32	17	5	10	51	37	+14	56	Qualification for the Conference League second qualifying round	0–1	2–1	—	1–0	3–0	4–1
4	Žilina	32	15	7	10	59	41	+18	52	Qualification for the Europa League first qualifying round (Note: Žilina qualified for the Europa League first qualifying round as the 2025–26 Slovak Cup winners.)	0–1	3–1	0–1	—	3–2	0–2
5	Zemplín Michalovce	32	13	5	14	44	52	−8	44		1–3	2–1	1–0	2–1	—	1–2
6	Podbrezová	32	13	3	16	55	51	+4	42		1–2	1–2	0–3	1–5	0–1	—

Source: Niké liga (in Slovak)
Rules for classification: 1) Points; 2) Points in regular season; 3) Head-to-head points in regular season; 4) Head-to-head goal difference in regular season; 5) Head-to-head goals scored in regular season; 6) Head-to-head away goals scored in regular season (if two teams tied); 7) Goal difference; 8) Goals scored; 9) Fair play ranking; 10) Drawing of lots.
(C) Champions

===== Results summary =====
Overall								Home						Away					
Pld	W	D	L	GF	GA	GD	Pts	W	D	L	GF	GA	GD	W	D	L	GF	GA	GD
10	5	0	5	16	14	+2	15	4	0	1	11	5	+6	1	0	4	5	9	−4

Source: Worldfootball

===== Results by round =====
Round	23	24	25	26	27	28	29	30	31	32
Ground	H	A	A	H	H	A	H	A	A	H
Result	W	L	L	L	W	W	W	L	L	W
Position	2	2	3	3	3	2	2	2	3	2
Points	46	46	46	46	49	52	55	55	55	58

Source: Worldfootball
A = Away; H = Home; W = Win; D = Draw; L = Loss

===== Matches =====
8 March 2026 23	DAC Dunajská Streda	2–1	Podbrezová	Dunajská Streda
18:00 CET (UTC+1)	Tuboly 12' (pen.); Mielke 76' (o.g.)	Report	Jurička (yellow card) 11'; Galčík 35'; Luka (yellow card) 44'; Paraj (yellow card) 78'; Štefánik (yellow card) 87'	Stadium: MOL Aréna; Attendance: 3,916; Referee: Peter Kráľovič; Assistant referees: Milan Štrbo, František Ferenc

21 March 2026 25	Žilina	3–1	DAC Dunajská Streda	Žilina
15:30 CET (UTC+1)	Káčer 7'; Roginić 42'; Homet 84'	Report	Kmeť 47'	Stadium: Štadión pod Dubňom; Attendance: 1,810; Referee: Peter Kráľovič; Assistant referees: Milan Štrbo, Peter Čajka

4 April 2026 26	DAC Dunajská Streda	0–3	Slovan Bratislava	Dunajská Streda
18:00 CEST (UTC+2)	Ramadan (yellow card) 66'; Ouro (yellow card) 82'	Report	Marcelli 23', (yellow card) 41'; Šporar 73', (yellow card) 82'; Weiss 85', (yellow card) 86'; Bajrić (yellow card) 90'	Stadium: MOL Aréna; Attendance: 6,230; Referee: Ivan Kružliak; Assistant referees: Branislav Hancko, Ján Pozor

12 April 2026 27	DAC Dunajská Streda	3–0	Zemplín Michalovce	Dunajská Streda
18:00 CEST (UTC+2)	Udvaros (yellow card) 26'; Kmeť 68'; Dzotsenidze 73' (o.g.); Gueye 87'; Kapanadze (yellow card) 89'	Report	Dzotsenidze (yellow card) 37'	Stadium: MOL Aréna; Attendance: 3,819; Referee: Marián Ruc; Assistant referees: Martin Vitko, Juraj Halíček

18 April 2026 28	Podbrezová	1–2	DAC Dunajská Streda	Podbrezová
15:30 CEST (UTC+2)	Paraj (yellow card) 13'; Chyla 32'	Report	Kacharaba (yellow card) 3'; Gueye 30'; Tuboly 41' (pen.); Blažek (yellow card) 69'; Diongue (yellow card) 81'; Kapanadze (yellow card) 83'; Gagua (yellow card) 90'	Stadium: ZELPO Aréna; Attendance: 459; Referee: Matej Choreň; Assistant referees: Dušan Štofik, Dávid Bobko

22 April 2026 24	Spartak Trnava	2–1	DAC Dunajská Streda	Trnava
18:00 CEST (UTC+2)	Gong 67'; Paur 75', (yellow card) 76'; Sabo (yellow card) 86'; Kratochvíl (yellow card) 90'	Report	Sylla (yellow card) 18'; Gueye 33'; Tuboly (yellow card) 47'; Gagua (yellow card) 58'	Stadium: Anton Malatinský Stadium; Attendance: 4,351; Referee: Bálint Kišš; Assistant referees: Ján Pozor, František Ferenc

25 April 2026 29	DAC Dunajská Streda	3–1	Žilina	Dunajská Streda
20:30 CEST (UTC+2)	Gruber 36'; Sylla 63'; Nemanič (yellow card) 71'; Kukovec 84'; Kapanadze (yellow card) 90+3'	Report	Ďatko 45+1'; Adang (yellow card) 67'	Stadium: MOL Aréna; Attendance: 4,269; Referee: Erik Gemzický; Assistant referees: Adam Jekkel, Tobiáš Pacák

2 May 2026 30	Slovan Bratislava	1–0	DAC Dunajská Streda	Bratislava
20:30 CEST (UTC+2)	Barseghyan 80'	Report	Kapanadze (yellow card) 33'; Gagua (yellow card) 42'; Ouro (red card) 62'	Stadium: Tehelné pole Attendance: 11,210; Referee: Peter Ziemba; Assistant referees: Daniel Poláček, Peter Bednár

9 May 2026 31	Zemplín Michalovce	2–1	DAC Dunajská Streda	Michalovce
18:00 CEST (UTC+2)	Volanakis (yellow card) 33'; Park (yellow card) 46'; Ahl 80'; Taylor-Hart 86'	Report	Kacharaba (yellow card) 47'; Gueye 54'	Stadium: Mestský futbalový štadión Attendance: 2,426; Referee: Matej Choreň; Assistant referees: Matej Zemko, Juraj Halíček

16 May 2026 32	DAC Dunajská Streda	3–0	Spartak Trnava	Dunajská Streda
17:00 CEST (UTC+2)	Bationo (yellow card) 8'; Gueye 16'; Gagua 23'; Blažek 31'	Report	Mikovič (yellow card) 40'; Kudlička (yellow card) 47'; Jureškin (yellow card) 90'	Stadium: MOL Aréna; Attendance: 5,908; Referee: Boris Marhefka; Assistant referees: Martin Vitko, Andrej Hrmo

=== Slovak Cup ===
20 August 2025 Second round	Jelka	0–4	DAC Dunajská Streda	Jelka
17:00 CEST (UTC+2)		Report	Đukanović 10'; Gueye 75'; Nemanič 87'; Gagua 89'	Attendance: 1,800; Referee: Miriama Bočková; Assistant referees: František Ferenc, Mário Roszbeck

24 September 2025 Third round	Gabčíkovo	0–1	DAC Dunajská Streda	Gabčíkovo
16:00 CEST (UTC+2)	Végh (yellow card) 51'; László (yellow card) 59'; Bertalan (yellow card) 81'; Szöcs (yellow card) 89'	Report	Gagua 13'; Sylla (yellow card) 90'	Stadium: Štadión Gabčíkovo; Attendance: 1,638; Referee: Matej Choreň; Assistant referees: Mário Roszbeck, Lukáš Lauer

5 November 2025 Fourth round	Petržalka	0–2	DAC Dunajská Streda	Petržalka
13:30 CET (UTC+1)		Report	Ramadan 9'; Herc (yellow card) 61'; Barro 90'	Stadium: Stadium FC Petržalka 1898; Attendance: 820; Referee: Michal Očenáš; Assistant referees: Pavel Jánošík, Rastislav Kuba

3 December 2025 Round of 16	DAC Dunajská Streda	3–0	Zemplín Michalovce	Dunajská Streda
17:30 CET (UTC+1)	Redzic 43', 87'; Ramadan 80'	Report	Dzotsenidze (yellow card) 71'	Stadium: MOL Aréna; Attendance: 1,932; Referee: Boris Marhefka; Assistant referees: Peter Čajka, Rastislav Kuba; Fourth official: Erik Gemzický

4 March 2026 Quarter-finals	Košice	4–0	DAC Dunajská Streda	Košice
18:00 CET (UTC+1)	Gallovič 25'; Miljanić 41'; Lukačević 53'; Perišić 83'	Report	Kukovec (yellow card) 38'; Kacharaba (yellow card) 52'	Stadium: Košická futbalová aréna Attendance: 4,989; Referee: Erik Gemzický; Assistant referees: Daniel Poláček, Peter Čajka; Fourth official: Lukáš Dzivjak
