= Matúš Begala =

Slovak footballer

Personal information
- Date of birth: 7 April 2001 (age 25)
- Place of birth: Stará Ľubovňa, Slovakia
- Height: 1.85 m (6 ft 1 in)
- Position: Midfielder

Team information
- Current team: GKS Tychy
- Number: 8

Youth career
- –2013: Goral Stará Ľubovňa
- 2013–2020: Zemplín Michalovce

Senior career*
Years	Team	Apps	(Gls)
2017–2023	Zemplín Michalovce	81	(2)
2023–2025	PAS Giannina	26	(2)
2025–2026	Zemplín Michalovce	8	(0)
2026–	GKS Tychy	0	(0)

International career
2016	Slovakia U15	2	(0)
2017	Slovakia U16	3	(0)
2017–2018	Slovakia U17	10	(0)
2020	Slovakia U19	2	(1)
- * Club domestic league appearances and goals as of 25 May 2026

Matúš Begala (born 7 April 2001) is a Slovak professional footballer who plays as a midfielder for II liga club GKS Tychy.

== Career ==
=== Zemplín Michalovce ===
Begala made his Frotuna Liga debut for Zemplín Michalovce against Senica on 9 December 2017. Begala replaced Martin Regáli in stoppage time of the 1–1 game. Stanislav Danko had equalised for Michalovce, but Jurij Medveděv had scored for the home side.

=== PAS Giannina ===
Begala signed a contract with Greek club PAS Giannina until 2025. However, Giannina was relegated to the second division after the season and failed to return to the top flight.

=== Return to Michalovce ===
On 26 September 2025, it was announced that Begala would be re-joining Zemplín Michalovce on a free transfer. His first appearance after returning would be in a 2–0 win against AS Trenčín, coming off the bench as a substitute for Ben Cottrell in the 86th minute.

=== GKS Tychy ===
On 19 June 2026, Begala agreed to join recently relegated third-tier club GKS Tychy in Poland.

== Honours ==
Individual

- Slovak Super Liga U21 Team of the Season: 2021–22
