= Kai Brosnan =

English footballer (born 2002)

Personal information
- Full name: Kai Martin Omoko Brosnan
- Date of birth: 28 April 2002 (age 24)
- Place of birth: London, England
- Height: 1.73 m (5 ft 8 in)
- Position: Winger

Team information
- Current team: Zemplín Michalovce
- Number: 7

Youth career
- Barnet

Senior career*
Years	Team	Apps	(Gls)
2020	North Greenford United	7	(1)
2021–2022	Hanwell Town	0	(0)
2022	Hadley	1	(0)
2022–2023	Harrow Borough	35	(8)
2023–2024	Hendon	54	(12)
2025	Hemel Hempstead Town	23	(2)
2025–	Zemplín Michalovce	37	(3)
- * Club domestic league appearances and goals as of 21 September 2026

Kai Martin Omoko Brosnan (born 28 April 2002) is an English professional footballer who plays as a winger for Slovak club Zemplín Michalovce.

== Career ==
=== Early career ===
Brosnan, who was born on 28 April 2002 in London, started his football career at local club Barnet. He then played for other London clubs such as Hanwell Town, Harrow Borough and Hendon. He made 78 appearances for Hendon, scoring 22 goals.

On 13 December 2024, it was announced that Brosnan would be joining English 6th level side Hemel Hempstead Town.

=== Zemplín Michalovce ===
On 10 July 2025, it was announced that Brosnan would be joining Slovak club Zemplín Michalovce, signing a two-year contract. He made his debut for the club in a 1–0 win against MFK Ružomberok, playing 70 minutes of the game. Brosnan's first contribution came in a 2–1 loss against Tatran Presov, assisting a goal scored by Samuel Ramos. He scored his first goal for the club in a 2–0 win over MFK Skalica, scoring in the 23rd minute. He also found a goal in the next match against AS Trenčín, securing a 2–0 win. Until the winter break, Brosnan played 14 league games, scoring 2 goals and assisting 3.
