= Ousmane Samba =

Mauritanian footballer (born 1988)

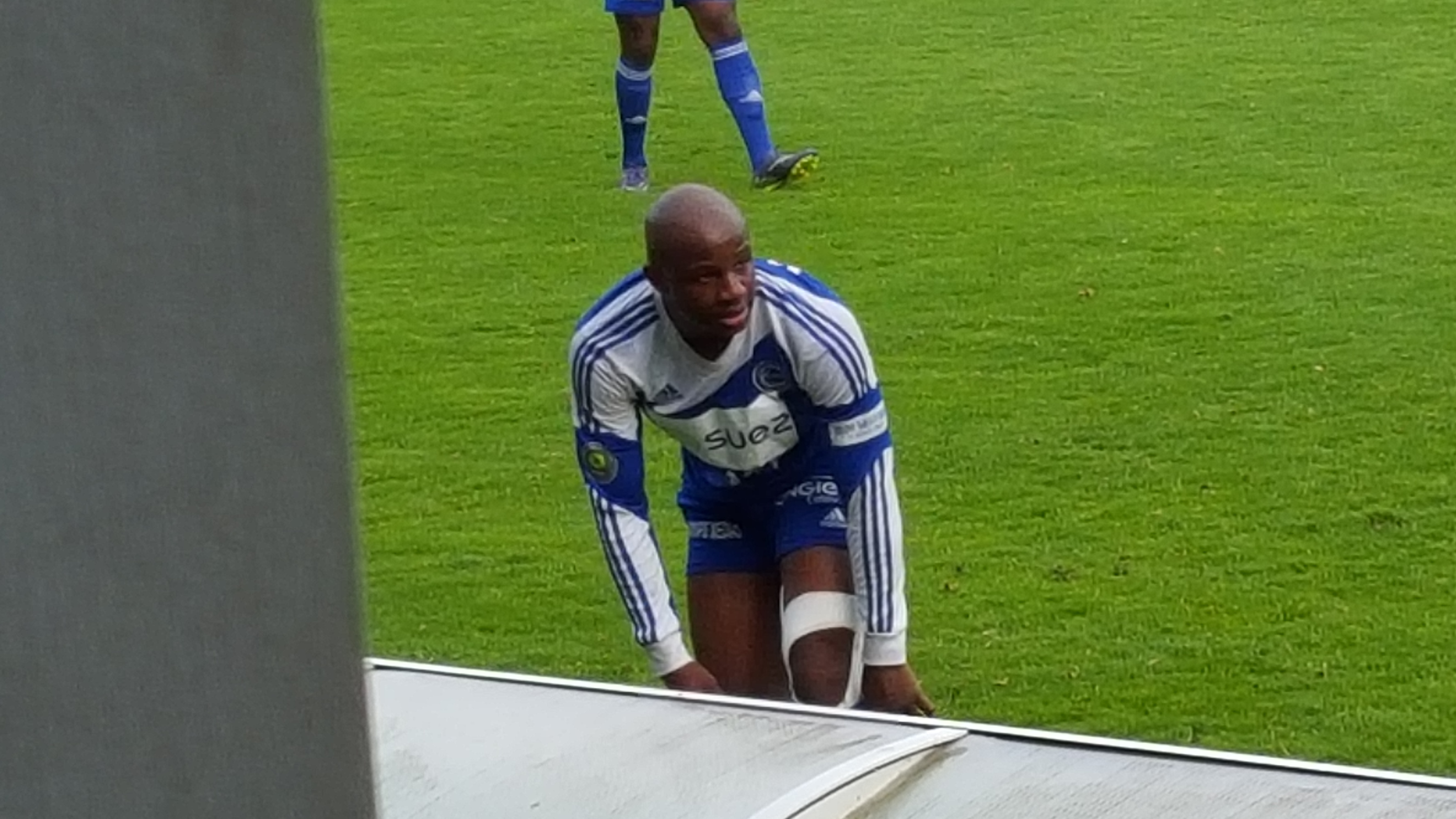
- Samba in 2016

Personal information
- Date of birth: 16 October 1988 (age 38)
- Place of birth: Niabina, Mauritania
- Height: 1.76 m (5 ft 9 in)
- Position: Right-back

Senior career*
Years	Team	Apps	(Gls)
2008–2010	Levallois		
2010–2011	Las Lilas		
2011–2012	Zemplín Michalovce	5	(0)
2012–2013	Blanc Mesnil Sport		
2013–2016	Aubervilliers	62	(0)
2016–2019	Drancy	71	(0)
2019–2020	Racing Colombes	3	(0)
2020–2021	Bergerac	2	(0)
2021–2023	Chantilly	35	(0)

International career
2014–2017	Mauritania	1	(0)
- * Club domestic league appearances and goals as of 18:02, 8 November 2019 (UTC)

Ousmane Samba (born 16 October 1988) is a Mauritanian professional footballer who plays as a right-back. He made one appearance for the Mauritania national team.

== Career ==
In July 2011, Samba joined Slovak club Zemplín Michalovce. He made his debut for Michalovce against Dubnica on 13 August 2011.

In 2014, during his time at Aubervilliers, Samba was called up to the Mauritania national team.
