= Yushi Shimamura =

Japanese footballer

Yushi Shimamura 島村 優志
Personal information
- Date of birth: 20 December 1999 (age 26)
- Place of birth: Tokyo, Japan
- Height: 1.74 m (5 ft 9 in)
- Position: Midfielder

Team information
- Current team: Irtysh Pavlodar
- Number: 6

Youth career
- –2017: Tokyo Kurume HS
- 2018–2021: Newell's Old Boys

Senior career*
Years	Team	Apps	(Gls)
2021–2022	ŠK Tvrdošín	11	(5)
2022	→ Zemplín Michalovce (loan)	2	(0)
2022–2026	Zemplín Michalovce	64	(0)
2026–	Irtysh Pavlodar	27	(3)
- * Club domestic league appearances and goals as of 1 November 2026

Yushi Shimamura (島村 優志, Shimamura Yushi; born 20 December 1999) is a Japanese footballer currently playing as a midfielder for Irtysh Pavlodar in Kazakhstan.

== Career ==
=== Early career ===
Born in Tokyo, Japan, Shimamura attended the Tokyo Kurume High School. In January 2018, without even attending his graduation ceremony, Shimamura flew to Argentina to sign for Newell's Old Boys. While in Rosario, he played mostly for Newell's under-23 side.

=== Michalovce ===
Shimamura moved to Slovakia in August 2021, signing with ŠK Tvrdošín. He would go on to score 5 goals for Tvrdošín, before attracting interest from first division club Zemplín Michalovce, who he would sign for on loan in January 2022. He made his debut for the club in a 2–1 loss against league newcomers MFK Tatran Liptovský Mikuláš, coming on off the bench in the 62nd minute for Brian Peña.

== Career statistics ==
=== Club ===
As of 9 June 2022.

Club	Season	League			Cup		Other		Total	
Club	Season	Division	Apps	Goals	Apps	Goals	Apps	Goals	Apps	Goals
Zemplín Michalovce	2021–22	Slovak Super Liga	2	0	0	0	0	0	2	0
Zemplín Michalovce	2022–23	Slovak First Division	7	0	-	-	-	-	7	0
Zemplín Michalovce	2023–24	Slovak First Division	17	0	-	-	-	-	17	0
Zemplín Michalovce	2024–25	Slovak First Division	21	0	-	-	-	-	21	0
Career total			47	0	0	0	0	0	2	0
