= Park Tae-rang =

South Korean footballer (born 2002)

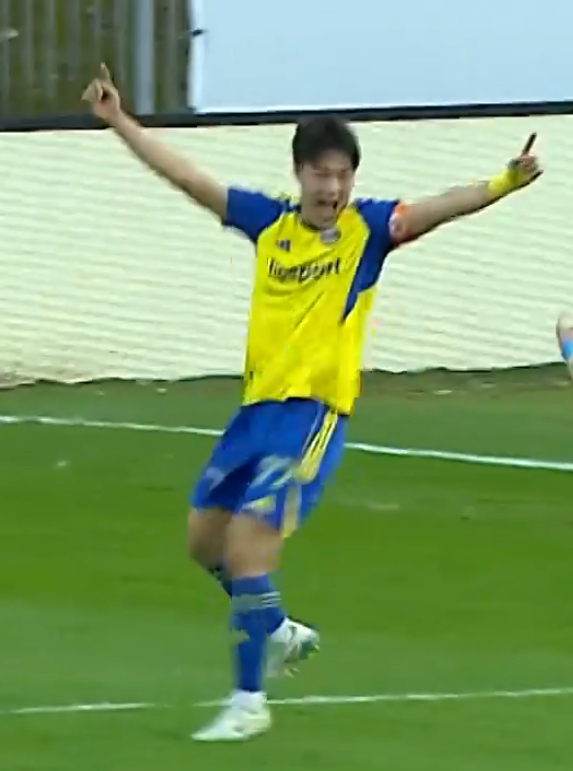
- Tae-rang celebrating his first goal for Michalovce

Personal information
- Date of birth: 4 September 2002 (age 24)
- Place of birth: Yeonsu-gu, Incheon, South Korea
- Height: 1.92 m (6 ft 4 in)
- Position: Defender

Team information
- Current team: Zemplín Michalovce
- Number: 77

Youth career
- 2018–2021: Gangwon FC
- 2021–2024: Catholic Kwandong University

Senior career*
| Years | Team | Apps | (Gls) |
| 2024–2025 | Gangwon FC | | |
| 2025 | Sejong SA FC | 16 | (1) |
| 2025– | Zemplín Michalovce | 20 | (1) |
Korean name
| Hangul | 박태랑 |
| RR | Bak Taerang |
| MR | Pak T'aerang |
- * Club domestic league appearances and goals as of 21 September 2026

Park Tae-rang (Korean: 박태랑; born 4 September 2002) is a South Korean footballer player who plays for Slovak club MFK Zemplín Michalovce.

== Club career ==
=== Early career ===
Park Tae-rang was born on September 4, 2002 in Incheon, South Korea, where he took his first steps in football at the local club United. He later played for Seoul Hwagok Middle School, Gangneung Jeil High School, Kwandong University, Gangwon FC and Sejong SA FC.

=== Michalovce ===
On 17 July 2025, it was announced that Park would be leaving South Korea for the first time in his career to join Slovak club MFK Zemplín Michalovce, signing a 3 year contract. He made his league debut for Zemplín in a 1–0 away win over MFK Ružomberok, coming onto the game as a substitute in the 46th minute for goal scorer Martin Bednár. Park scored his first goal for Michalovce in a 1–0 away win against FK Železiarne Podbrezová, scoring the winning goal in the 69th minute after heading in a cross from Tornike Dzotsenidze.
