= Tomasz Walczak =

Polish footballer (born 2005)

Personal information
- Full name: Tomasz Walczak
- Date of birth: 17 August 2005 (age 21)
- Place of birth: Płock, Poland
- Height: 1.92 m (6 ft 4 in)
- Position: Forward

Team information
- Current team: Zemplín Michalovce
- Number: 9

Youth career
- 2013–2018: Legia Warsaw
- 2018–2021: Escola Varsovia Warsaw

Senior career*
Years	Team	Apps	(Gls)
2021–2023	Wisła Płock	9	(0)
2023–2026	Raków Częstochowa	3	(0)
2023–2026	Raków Częstochowa II	28	(22)
2024	→ Pogoń Siedlce (loan)	12	(3)
2025	→ Miedź Legnica (loan)	15	(3)
2025	→ Miedź Legnica II (loan)	1	(0)
2026–	Zemplín Michalovce	14	(0)

International career
2018	Poland U14	1	(1)
2019	Poland U16	2	(1)
2021	Poland U17	3	(1)
- * Club domestic league appearances and goals as of 21 September 2026

Tomasz Walczak (born 17 August 2005) is a Polish professional footballer who plays as a forward for Slovak club Zemplín Michalovce. Prior to his arrival in Michalovce, he played in Poland.

== Club career ==
=== Early career ===
Walczak was a part of the youth academy of Legia Warsaw. He made his debut in the first team of Wisla Plock at the age of 16.

=== Michalovce ===
On 10 January 2026, it was announced that Walczak would be joining Slovak club Zemplín Michalovce, coming in as a replacement for Gytis Paulauskas. His move was completed on 13 January, and he signed a three-year contract.

== Honours ==
Wisła Płock II

- Polish Cup (Płock regionals): 2021–22

Pogoń Siedlce

- II liga: 2023–24
