= Miroslav Tóth =

Slovak footballer

Miroslav Toth
Personal information
- Date of birth: December 5, 1978 (age 47)
- Place of birth: Trebišov, Slovakia
- Height: 1.69 m (5 ft 6 1/2 in)
- Position: Forward

Senior career*
Years	Team	Apps	(Gls)
1999–2001	FK Chropyně	56	(19)
2001–2003	Chmel Blsany	10	(1)
2004–2006	MFK Zemplin Michalovce	37	(9)
2007	FC Hlucin	14	(3)
2008	Zlate Moravce	20	(2)
2009	Dukla Banská Bystrica	25	(5)
2010	TOT	21	(7)
2011	Muangthong United	3	(2)
2011–2012	Bangkok United	16	(3)
2012–2013	Trat		
2013	PTT Rayong		
2014	Chumphon		
2014–2015	ASKÖ Vorchdorf		
2015–2016	Bruckmühl		
2016	OFK Veľký Lapáš		
2016	TSU Hafnerbach		
- * Club domestic league appearances and goals

Miroslav Toth (born December 5, 1978) is a Slovak footballer.

In 2010 Thai Premier League, he was TOT-CAT F.C. top goalscorer with 7 goals.
