= Samuel Ramos (footballer, born 2000) =

Spanish footballer (born 2000)

Personal information
- Full name: Samuel Antonio Ramos Linares
- Date of birth: 18 August 2000 (age 26)
- Place of birth: Santa Cruz de Tenerife, Spain
- Height: 1.81 m (5 ft 11 in)
- Position: Central midfielder

Team information
- Current team: St Mirren
- Number: 10

Youth career
- SJ Tablero CF
- CD Sobradillo

Senior career*
Years	Team	Apps	(Gls)
2019–2020	Santa Úrsula	25	(7)
2020–2022	Las Palmas C	43	(14)
2022–2023	Las Palmas Atlético	36	(7)
2023	Mensajero	8	(0)
2024–2026	Zemplín Michalovce	50	(11)
2026-	St Mirren	3	(1)
- * Club domestic league appearances and goals

Samuel Antonio Ramos Linares (born 18 August 2000) is a Spanish professional footballer who plays as a central midfielder for Scottish Premiership club St Mirren.

== Career ==
Ramos was born in Santa Cruz de Tenerife and played in the Las Palmas academy. He played senior football for the third and reserve teams.

On 22 January 2024, it was announced that Ramos would be joining Slovak club Zemplín Michalovce, signing a two-year contract. He made his professional debut for Zemplín Michalovce in a 2–1 loss against Železiarne Podbrezová, coming on as a substitute for Martin Bednár.He moved to St. Mirren in summer 2026.
