= Franck Bahi =

Guinean footballer

Personal information
- Full name: Henry Franck Bahi
- Date of birth: 20 December 1999 (age 26)
- Place of birth: Conakry, Guinea
- Height: 1.80 m (5 ft 11 in)
- Position: Left-back

Team information
- Current team: Michalovce
- Number: 12

Youth career
- –2018: Académie SOAR

Senior career*
Years	Team	Apps	(Gls)
2018–2021	Gent U21		
2021–2024	Šamorín	46	(2)
2023–2024	→ Michalovce (loan)	30	(1)
2024–	Michalovce	44	(0)
- * Club domestic league appearances and goals as of 21 September 2026

Henry Franck Bahi (born 20 December 1999) is a Guinean professional footballer who plays as a defender for Slovak club MFK Zemplín Michalovce.
