= Matúš Marcin =

Slovak footballer

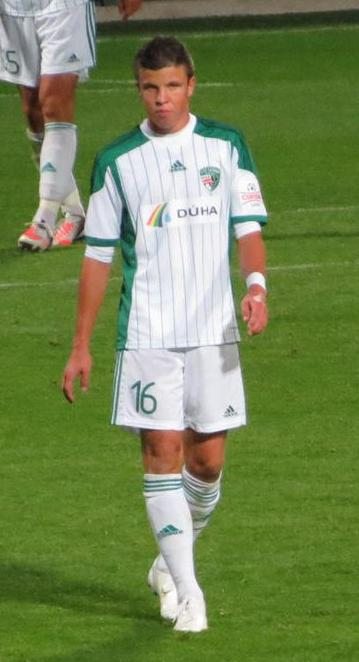

Personal information
- Full name: Matúš Marcin
- Date of birth: 6 April 1994 (age 32)
- Place of birth: Prešov, Slovakia
- Height: 1.80 m (5 ft 11 in)
- Positions: Forward; winger

Youth career
- 2001–2004: SAFI Prešov
- 2005–2011: Tatran Prešov

Senior career*
Years	Team	Apps	(Gls)
2012–2013	Tatran Prešov	34	(4)
2013–2018	Vysočina Jihlava	7	(0)
2013	→ Dukla Banská Bystrica (loan)	10	(3)
2019	TJ Sokol Ľubotice	11	(12)
2019	Železiarne Podbrezová	7	(0)
2020–2021	Elana Toruń	27	(9)
2021–2025	Zemplín Michalovce	103	(27)
2025–2026	Podbrezova	5	(1)
Total		204	(56)

International career
- Slovakia U16
- Slovakia U17
	Slovakia U18	6	(2)
2012–2013	Slovakia U19	10	(4)
2013	Slovakia U21	1	(0)
- * Club domestic league appearances and goals as of 17 January 2026

Matúš Marcin (born 6 April 1994) is retired Slovak professional footballer who last played for Slovak Super Liga club FK Železiarne Podbrezová.

== Club career ==
=== Tatran Prešov ===
Marcin made his official debut for Tatran Prešov on 5 May 2012, playing the last 6 minutes in a 4–0 home win against DAC Dunajská Streda. His first Corgoň Liga goal came at the home win against Slovan Bratislava in the last match of the 2011-12 season.

=== Vysočina Jihlava ===
In summer 2013, he left from Tatran Prešov to Gambrinus Liga club Vysočina Jihlava.

=== Elana Toruń ===
Marcin's transfer to Elana was announced on 16 January 2020, along with the arrival of fellow countrymen Lukáš Hrnčiar.
