= Matej Čurma =

Slovak footballer

Personal information
- Full name: Matej Čurma
- Date of birth: 7 March 1996 (age 30)
- Place of birth: Pliešovce, Slovakia
- Height: 1.81 m (5 ft 11 in)
- Position: Defender

Team information
- Current team: Zemplín Michalovce
- Number: 27

Youth career
- –2011: Lokomotíva Zvolen
- 2011–2013: Ružomberok

Senior career*
Years	Team	Apps	(Gls)
2014–2021	Ružomberok	78	(0)
2015	→ Liptovský Mikuláš (loan)	9	(1)
2016	→ Lokomotíva Zvolen (loan)	14	(0)
2021–2023	Spartak Trnava	37	(1)
2023–2024	Karviná	14	(0)
2024	→→ Karviná B	2	(0)
2024	Zvolen	4	(1)
2025	Líšeň	7	(0)
2025–	Zemplín Michalovce	33	(0)
- * Club domestic league appearances and goals as of 21 September 2026

Matej Čurma (born 7 March 1996) is a Slovak footballer who plays as a defender for MFK Zemplín Michalovce.

== Club career ==
Čurma was nominated for nine fixtures before he made his Fortuna Liga debut for Ružomberok against Železiarne Podbrezová on 19 May 2017. He was replaced by Andrej Lovás after 80 minutes of the match at a goal-less score. Ružomberok went on to win, following a goal by Erik Daniel before the end of the match.

On 7 July 2023, Čurma signed a contract with Czech side Karviná as a free agent. In July 2024, he was released by Karviná as a free agent. In October 2024, he signed a contract until the winter break with the 2. Liga team MFK Zvolen.

On 15 January 2025, Čurma signed a contract with Czech side Líšeň as a free agent.

On 31 July 2025, it was announced that Čurma would be joining MFK Zemplín Michalovce.

== Honours ==
Spartak Trnava

- Slovak Cup: 2021–22, 2022–23
