= Nino Kukovec =

Slovenian footballer (born 1996)

Personal information
- Date of birth: 6 May 2001 (age 25)
- Place of birth: Slovenj Gradec, Slovenia
- Height: 1.90 m (6 ft 3 in)
- Position: Forward

Team information
- Current team: FK Csíkszereda (on loan from DAC Dunajská Streda)
- Number: 9

Youth career
- –2015: Dravograd
- 2015–2018: Maribor
- 2018–2021: Fiorentina

Senior career*
Years	Team	Apps	(Gls)
2021	Celje	0	(0)
2022–2023	Iglesias		
2023	Bistrica	12	(5)
2023–2026	Radomlje	72	(18)
2026–	Dunajská Streda	11	(1)
2026–	→ FK Csíkszereda (loan)	6	(1)

International career
2016	Slovenia U15	3	(0)
2017–2018	Slovenia U17	10	(1)
2018–2019	Slovenia U18	3	(0)
2019	Slovenia U19	1	(0)
- * Club domestic league appearances and goals as of 7 November 2026

Nino Kukovec (born 6 May 2001) is a Slovenian professional footballer who plays as a forward for Liga I club FK Csíkszereda, on loan from Slovak First League club Dunajská Streda.

== Honours ==
Celje

- Slovenian Cup runner-up: 2020–21
