= José Ángel López (footballer, born 1999) =

Mexican footballer (born 1999)

Personal information
- Full name: José Ángel López López
- Date of birth: 25 August 1999 (age 27)
- Place of birth: Coatzacoalcos, Veracruz, Mexico
- Height: 1.79 m (5 ft 10 in)
- Position: Forward

Team information
- Current team: Zemplín Michalovce
- Number: 11

Youth career
- 2018–2019: América

Senior career*
Years	Team	Apps	(Gls)
2018–2020	América	2	(1)
2020–2021	Juárez	2	(0)
2020	→ Tlaxcala (loan)	15	(0)
2022–2023	Zacatecas	19	(5)
2022	→ Tepatitlán (loan)	14	(1)
2023	→ Durango (loan)	16	(1)
2024	Sonora	7	(1)
2024–2025	Tampico Madero	11	(2)
2025–	Zemplín Michalovce	17	(1)
- * Club domestic league appearances and goals as of 25 May 2026

José Ángel López López (born 25 August 1999) is a Mexican professional footballer who plays as a forward for Zemplín Michalovce.

== Early life ==
A native of the port city of Coatzacoalcos in the southern Mexican state of Veracruz, he is a product of the CF América youth academy.

== Club career ==
=== Michalovce ===
On 7 August 2025, it was announced that López would be joining Slovak First League club Zemplín Michalovce. The first Mexican footballer in the history of the Michalovce club signed a two-year contract. López made his debut for the club in a 4–2 home loss against MŠK Žilina. He played 10 matches in until the winter break, not being able to contribute a goal nor an assist.

== Career statistics ==
=== Club ===
As of 5 December 2021

Club	Season	League			Cup		Continental		Other		Total	
Club	Season	Division	Apps	Goals	Apps	Goals	Apps	Goals	Apps	Goals	Apps	Goals
América	2019–20	Liga MX	2	1	—		—		—		2	1
Juárez	2019–20	Liga MX	—		2	0	—		—		2	0
Juárez	2021–22	Liga MX	2	0	—		—		—		2	0
Juárez	Total		2	0	2	0	—		—		4	0
Tlaxcala (loan)	2020–21	Liga de Expansión MX	15	0	—		—		—		15	0
Career total			19	1	2	0	0	0	0	0	21	1
