= Artúr Musák =

Slovak footballer (born 2005)

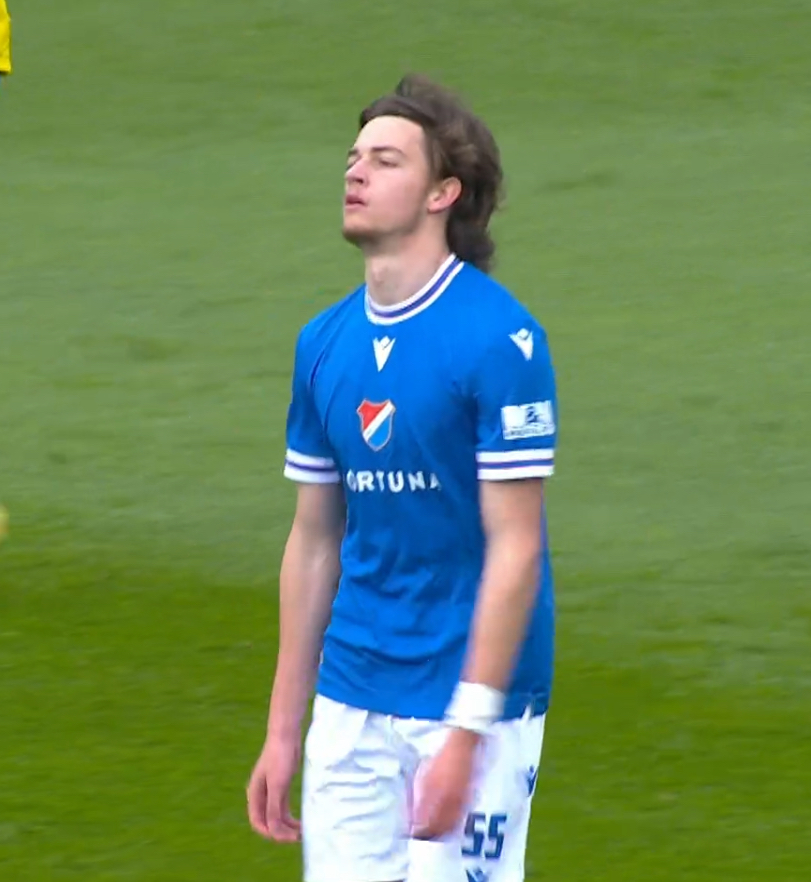
- Musák in 2026

Personal information
- Date of birth: 17 October 2005 (age 21)
- Place of birth: Uzhhorod, Ukraine
- Height: 1.82 m (6 ft 0 in)
- Position: Midfielder

Team information
- Current team: Baník Ostrava
- Number: 55

Youth career
- –2023: Zemplín Michalovce

Senior career*
Years	Team	Apps	(Gls)
2023–2025	Zemplín Michalovce	35	(3)
2025–	Baník Ostrava	19	(0)
2025–	Baník Ostrava B	3	(1)

International career^{‡}
2026–	Slovakia U21	1	(0)
- * Club domestic league appearances and goals as of 25 May 2026 ‡ National team caps and goals as of 11:35, 2 April 2026 (UTC)

Artúr Musák (born 17 October 2005) is a footballer who plays as a midfielder for Czech club Baník Ostrava. Born in Ukraine, he represents Slovakia at youth level.

== Club career ==
=== Zemplín Michalovce ===
Musák is a product on the Zemplín academy. He made his professional debut for Zemplín on 29 July 2023 in a 0–0 draw against Dunajská Streda, coming on as a substitute in the 90th minute for Daniel Pavúk. He scored his first goal in a 1–0 win over Dukla Banská Bystrica, securing the 3 points for his team. Musák signed his first professional contract with Zemplín on 23 August 2025, signing a 2-year contract. A day after signing the contract, he scored the equalizing goal against Slovan Bratislava, scoring in the 62th minute. In August 2025, it was reported that a bid of €500,000 offered by Czech club Baník Ostrava in exchange for Musák was rejected by Zemplín.

=== Baník Ostrava ===
On 5 September 2025, it was announced that Musák had joined Czech First League club FC Baník Ostrava, signing a contract until the year 2030. He made his debut for Baník in a 2–0 loss against Slovan Liberec on 13 September 2025. Musák debuted in the starting line-up in a 1–0 loss against FK Jablonec, playing 73 minutes.

== International career ==
In March 2026, Musák was called up to the Slovakia national under-21 football team ahead of a match against Kazakhstan U21. He featured in a 3–1 win for Slovakia.

== Personal life ==
Musák was born on 17 October 2005 in Uzhhorod, Ukraine, where he lived until he was 12. He has also had a Hungarian passport since he was 6. His mother Tünde was born in Chop, which is the westernmost city in Ukraine. Up to 40 percent of the population in the town is Hungarian. His father Oleksandr was born in Uzhhorod. Artúr also has a sister, Karina.

Despite being born in Ukraine, Musák speaks fluent Slovak.

In November 2025, Musák obtained Slovak citizenship and decided to represent Slovakia.
