= Damir Redzic =

Hungarian footballer (born 2003)

- Redzic in 2026

Personal information
- Date of birth: 23 March 2003 (age 23)
- Place of birth: Pécs, Hungary
- Height: 1.79 m (5 ft 10 in)
- Position: Forward

Team information
- Current team: Red Bull Salzburg
- Number: 23

Youth career
- –2011: Harkány
- 2011–2013: Kozármisleny SE
- 2013–2017: Pécsi MFC
- 2017–2021: Ferencváros

Senior career*
Years	Team	Apps	(Gls)
2021–2024	Ferencváros	4	(0)
2021–2022	Ferencváros II	26	(10)
2021–2022	→ Soroksár SC (loan)	25	(8)
2021–2022	→ Soroksár SC (loan)	12	(2)
2023–2024	→ DAC Dunajská Streda (loan)	11	(2)
2024–2026	DAC Dunajská Streda	31	(12)
2026–	Red Bull Salzburg	17	(2)

International career^{‡}
2020	Hungary U17	3	(0)
2021	Hungary U18	1	(0)
2021–2022	Hungary U19	8	(2)
2025–	Hungary	5	(0)
- * Club domestic league appearances and goals as of 19:14, 25 October 2026 (UTC) ‡ National team caps and goals as of 9 June 2026

Damir Redzic (Bosnian: Damir Redžić; born 23 March 2003) is a Hungarian professional footballer who plays as a forward for Austrian Bundesliga club Red Bull Salzburg and the Hungary national team.

== Career ==
Redzic was born in Pécs, Hungary, to a Bosnian father and a Hungarian mother.

=== Ferencváros ===
On 23 January 2021, he played his first match for Ferencváros' first team against Puskás Akadémia on the 17th matchday of the 2020–21 Nemzeti Bajnokság I season.

=== DAC Dunajská Streda ===
On 7 September 2023, Redzic was loaned to DAC Dunajská Streda.

On 3 July 2024, he joined DAC Dunajská Streda on a permanent basis. On 17 August 2024, he scored his first league goal in a 3–0 victory over Zemplín Michalovce. On 26 April 2025, he scored the winning goal in a 2–1 league win over lovan Bratislava.

He scored his first league goal of the 2025–26 season in 2–0 victory over Ružomberok on 9 August 2025. Across the 2025–26 campaign, he scored nine goals in all competitions.

=== Red Bull Salzburg ===
On 2 February 2026, Redzic signed with Austrian Bundesliga club Red Bull Salzburg. Marcus Mann, managing director of Salzburg, described Redzic as "extremely eager to learn and, with his pace and eye for goal, brings precisely the qualities that will make us even more versatile and dangerous in attack".

On 22 February 2026, he scored his first goal in the 2025–26 Austrian Football Bundesliga season.

== Career statistics ==
=== Club ===
As of match played 25 October 2026

Appearances and goals by club, season and competition
Club	Season	League			National cup (Note: Includes Magyar Kupa, Slovak Cup, Austrian Cup)		Continental		Other		Total	
Club	Season	Division	Apps	Goals	Apps	Goals	Apps	Goals	Apps	Goals	Apps	Goals
Ferencváros II	2020–21	Nemzeti Bajnokság III	24	10	—		—		—		24	10
Ferencváros II	2021–22	Nemzeti Bajnokság III	2	0	—		—		—		2	0
Ferencváros II	Total		26	10	0	0	0	0	0	0	26	10
Ferencváros	2020–21	Nemzeti Bajnokság I	2	0	0	0	0	0	—		2	0
Ferencváros	2021–22	Nemzeti Bajnokság I	2	0	0	0	1 (Note: Appearance in UEFA Champions League)	0	—		3	0
Ferencváros	2022–23	Nemzeti Bajnokság I	0	0	0	0	1 (Note: Appearances in UEFA Europa League)	0	—		1	0
Ferencváros	Total		4	0	0	0	2	0	0	0	6	0
Soroksár SC (loan)	2021–22	Nemzeti Bajnokság II	25	8	1	0	—		—		26	8
Soroksár SC (loan)	2022–23	Nemzeti Bajnokság II	12	2	0	0	—		—		12	2
DAC Dunajská Streda (loan)	2023–24	Slovak First Football League	11	2	2	0	—		—		13	2
DAC Dunajská Streda	2024–25	Slovak First Football League	17	5	2	0	2 (Note: Appearances in UEFA Conference League)	0	1 (Note: Appearances in European play-offs)	0	22	5
DAC Dunajská Streda	2025–26	Slovak First Football League	14	7	1	2	—		—		15	9
DAC Dunajská Streda	Total		31	12	3	2	2	0	1	0	37	14
Red Bull Salzburg	2025–26	Austrian Bundesliga	9	1	1	0	—		—		10	1
Red Bull Salzburg	2026–27	Austrian Bundesliga	8	1	1	2	6	0	—		15	3
Red Bull Salzburg	Total		17	2	2	2	6	0	—		25	4
Career total			126	36	8	4	10	0	1	0	145	40

=== International ===
As of match played 9 June 2026

Appearances and goals by national team and year
National team	Year	Apps	Goals
Hungary	2025	1	0
Hungary	2026	4	0
Total		5	0
