= Adam Jakubech =

Slovak footballer

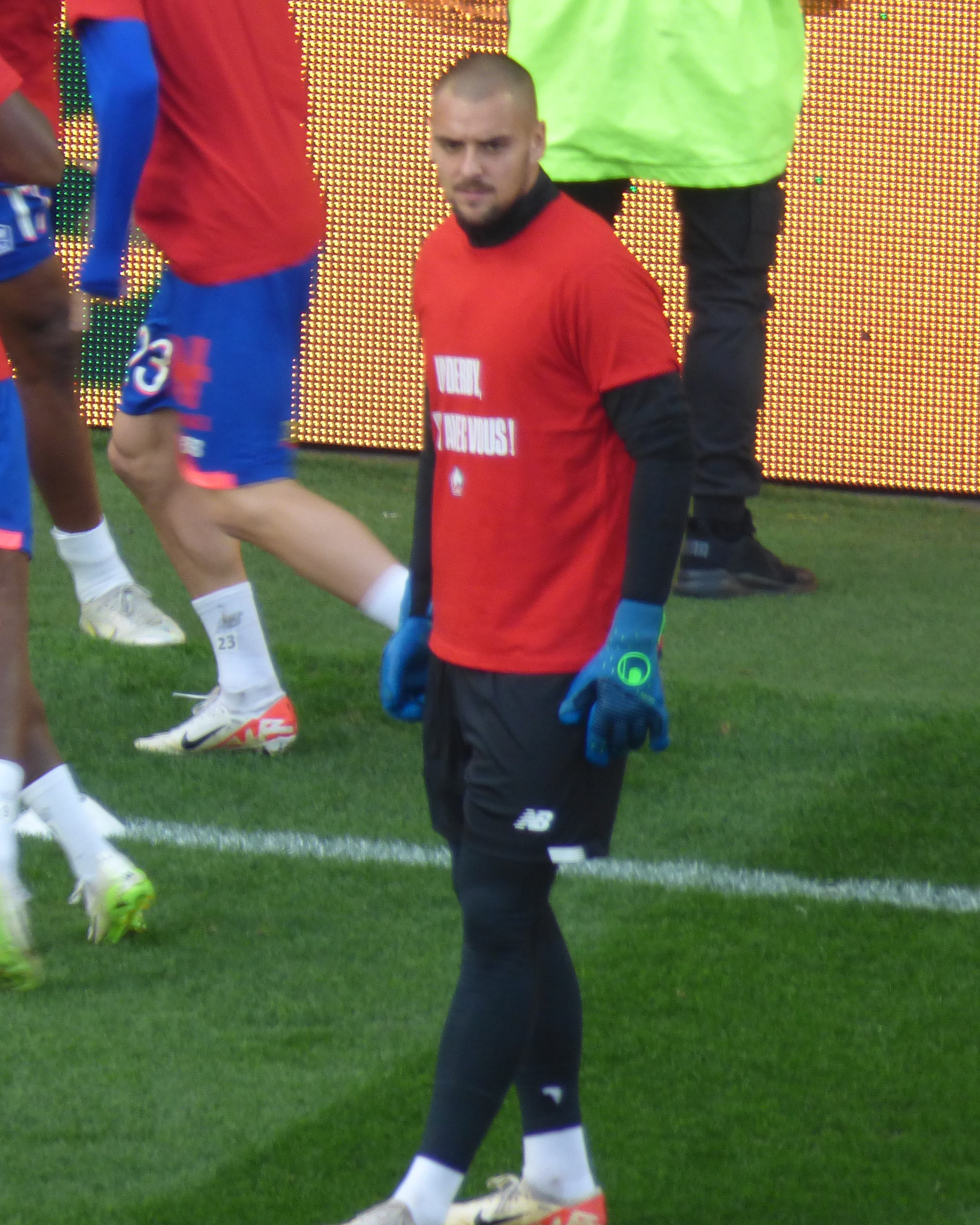
- Jakubech in 2023

Personal information
- Date of birth: 2 January 1997 (age 29)
- Place of birth: Prešov, Slovakia
- Height: 1.88 m (6 ft 2 in)
- Position: Goalkeeper

Team information
- Current team: Zemplín Michalovce
- Number: 16

Youth career
- Tatran Prešov

Senior career*
Years	Team	Apps	(Gls)
2014	Tatran Prešov	12	(0)
2015–2017	Spartak Trnava	49	(0)
2017–2024	Lille	0	(0)
2019–2021	→ Kortrijk (loan)	26	(0)
2025–	Zemplín Michalovce	19	(0)

International career
2014–2016	Slovakia U18	9	(0)
2015–2016	Slovakia U19	3	(0)
2016–2018	Slovakia U21	2	(0)
2017	Slovakia (unofficial)	1	(0)
- * Club domestic league appearances and goals as of 21 september 2026

Adam Jakubech (born 2 January 1997) is a Slovak professional footballer who plays as a goalkeeper for the Slovak First Football League team MFK Zemplín Michalovce.

== Club career ==
=== Spartak Trnava ===
Jakubech signed for Spartak Trnava in January 2015.

=== Lille ===
Jakubech transferred to OSC Lille of France in July 2017. He did not make a Ligue 1 appearance for Lille in the 2017–18 season. Jakubech spent two sessions at Lille on loan at K.V. Kortrijk. In 2022, Jakubech's club profile read that he is second or third choice goalkeeper but had continuously provided professionalism to the club. At the end of the 2024 session, he was released as free agent after his contract at Lille expired.

=== Zemplín Michalovce ===
After spending half a year as without a club, Jakubech signed a new contract with Slovak First Football League outfit Zemplín Michalovce in January 2025. In his first season for his new club, he would only play in one game, a 5–4 loss against league new comers KFC Komárno.

== International career ==
Jakubech was first called up for Slovakia's two unofficial friendly fixtures in Abu Dhabi, in January 2017 against Uganda and Sweden. He made his debut against Uganda, when he substituted Michal Šulla in the 46th minute, conceding a goal in 77th minute by Geofrey Massa after a corner kick, which marked the 1–3 defeat. Jakubech did not appear in the 0–6 loss against Sweden later that week.

He was next called up to the squad in October 2018, when Matúš Kozáčik had to withdraw due to an illness. He was called up to the squad, although he was set to prepare with the U21 for UEFA European Under-21 Championship qualification fixtures against Estonia and Northern Ireland, joining Martin Dúbravka and Michal Šulla.
