= Anton Šoltis =

Slovak footballer (born 1976)

Anton Šoltís
Personal information
- Full name: Anton Šoltís
- Date of birth: 5 February 1976 (age 50)
- Place of birth: Košice, Czechoslovakia
- Height: 1.73 m (5 ft 8 in)
- Position: Attacking midfielder

Team information
- Current team: Zemplín Michalovce (manager)

Youth career
- Lokomotíva Košice

Senior career*
| Years | Team | Apps | (Gls) |
| 1993–1998 | Lokomotíva Košice | 66 | (8) |
| 1997 | → Trenčín (loan) | | |
| 1998 | → Štúrovo (loan) | | |
| 1998 | Bardejov | 14 | (2) |
| 1999 | 1. FC Košice | | |
| 2000 | Prešov | 35 | (12) |
| 2000 | Slavia Prague | 4 | (0) |
| 2001 | Prešov | 15 | (4) |
| 2001–2006 | Petržalka | 133 | (19) |
| 2007 | ASK Kottingbrunn | | |
| 2008 | Humenné | | |
| 2008–2009 | MFK Košice | | |
| 2009 | Veľký Folkmar | | |
| 2010–2012 | Vyšné Opátske | | |
| 2011 | → Košice - Krásna (loan) | | |

International career^{‡}
| 2001–2002 | Slovakia | 3 | (0) |

Managerial career
- 2008–2011: Košice B (assistant)
- 2011–2012: Košice (assistant)
- 2012–2013: Ružomberok (assistant)
- 2014: Zemplín Michalovce (assistant)
- 2015–2016: Tatran Liptovský Mikuláš
- 2016: Zemplín Michalovce (assistant)
- 2016–2019: Zemplín Michalovce
- 2020–2021: Senica
- 2021: Zemplín Michalovce
- 2022–2023: FC Košice
- 2024–: Zemplín Michalovce
- * Club domestic league appearances and goals as of 11 April 2013 ‡ National team caps and goals as of 11 April 2013

Anton Šoltís (born 5 February 1976) is a retired Slovak football midfielder who is the manager of Zemplín Michalovce. Having led the team in 205 matches, he signed a two-year contract extension in April 2026. He previously managed FC Košice.

== Honours ==
=== Manager ===
FC Košice

- Slovak Second Division (1): 2022–23 (Promoted)
