= Mestský futbalový štadión =

Football stadium in Michalovce, Slovakia

Mestský futbalový štadión Michalovce
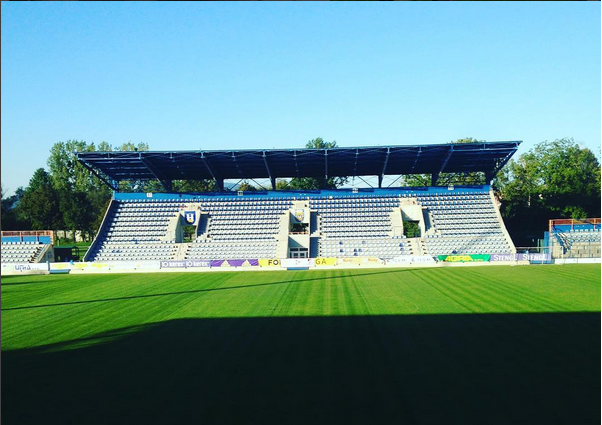
- UEFA
- Interactive map of Mestský futbalový štadión Michalovce
- Location: Hviezdoslavova 5, Michalovce, Slovakia
- Coordinates: 48°45′47.38″N 21°54′34.92″E
- Owner: City of Michalovce
- Operator: MFK Zemplín Michalovce
- Capacity: 4,400
- Surface: Grass
- Field size: 105 x 68 m

Construction
- Renovated: 2009–2010

Tenant
- MFK Zemplín Michalovce

Website
- new.mfkzemplin.sk

Zemplin Stadion is a multi-use stadium in Michalovce, Slovakia. It is currently used mostly for football matches and is the home ground of MFK Zemplín Michalovce. The stadium has a capacity of 4,400 seats. The intensity of the floodlighting is 1,200 lux.
