= Tsotne Kapanadze =

Georgian footballer (born 2001)

Personal information
- Full name: Tsotne Kapanadze
- Date of birth: 30 August 2001 (age 25)
- Place of birth: Georgia
- Height: 1.84 m (6 ft 0 in)
- Position: Right-back

Team information
- Current team: Dunajska Streda
- Number: 22

Youth career
- –2018: Saburtalo

Senior career*
Years	Team	Apps	(Gls)
2018–2024	Iberia 1999	68	(1)
2018–2019	→ Rustavi (loan)	33	(0)
2020	→ Locomotive (loan)	7	(0)
2021–2022	→ Telavi (loan)	58	(0)
2025–	Dunajska Streda	46	(1)

International career^{‡}
2016–2017	Georgia U17	4	(0)
2019	Georgia U19	3	(0)
2021–2023	Georgia U21	9	(2)
- * Club domestic league appearances and goals as of 21 September 2026 ‡ National team caps and goals as of 2 February 2025

Tsotne Kapanadze (Georgian: ცოტნე კაპანაძე; born 30 August 2001) is a Georgian professional footballer who plays as a right-back for Slovak Super Liga club Dunajska Streda.

Kapanadze is a Georgian champion and cup winner with Iberia 1999. Individually, he was included in the 2024 Erovnuli Liga Team of the Year.

== Club career ==
A product of Saburtalo's academy, Kapanadze played with first three clubs as a loanee. He started his professional career at Rustavi who had just earned their historic promotion to the Erovnuli Liga. Kapanadze made his top-flight debut on 23 September 2018 against Dila. The next year Rustavi were relegated, although Kapanadze won his first national individual award as an under-19 player. After a one-year stint with Locomotive, he moved to Telavi in 2021.

In January 2023, Kapanadze finally returned to his childhood team. In the following two seasons with Saburtalo, who were named as Iberia 1999 in early 2024, Kapanadze won two top titles. First, he played all five games of their victorious cup campaign, followed by the 2024 league season in which Kapanadze featured in all 36 matches. After this season the player was named in Team of the Year.

In January 2025, Kapanadze joined Slovak Super Liga side DAK 1904 on a deal until the summer of 2026. On 15 March he scored his first goal for the team in a 3–1 win over MŠK Žilina.

== International ==
Kapanadze was 15 years old, when he made an official international debut with U17s against Finland on 30 September 2016. Later he was called up by coach Georgi Nemsadze for the 2018 UEFA European under-17 championship elite round.

In October 2019, Kapanadze played in all three 2020 UEFA European Under-19 Championship qualifiers.

Soon he joined U21s. Kapanadze bagged a brace in a 2–0 friendly win over Romania on 3 June 2022. He was also a member of the squad that took part in 2023 UEFA European Championship, co-hosted by Georgia.

== Honours ==
=== Club ===
Iberia 1999

- Erovnuli Liga: 2024
- Georgian Cup: 2023

=== Individual ===
- U19 Aleksandre Chivadze Silver Medal: 2019
- Erovnuli Liga Team of the Season: 2024
