= Abdul Zubairu =

Nigerian footballer

Personal information
- Full name: Abdul Musa Zubairu
- Date of birth: 3 October 1998 (age 28)
- Place of birth: Kaduna, Nigeria
- Height: 1.65 m (5 ft 5 in)
- Position: Midfielder

Team information
- Current team: Zemplín Michalovce
- Number: 4

Youth career
- GBS Academy

Senior career*
| Years | Team | Apps | (Gls) |
| 2017–2022 | AS Trenčín | 130 | (4) |
| 2022 | Zrinjski Mostar | 7 | (0) |
| 2023 | Kolubara | 11 | (0) |
| 2023– | Zemplín Michalovce | 73 | (1) |
- * Club domestic league appearances and goals as of 21 September 2026

Abdul Zubairu (born 3 October 1998) is a Nigerian professional footballer who plays as a midfielder for Slovak Niké liga club Zemplín Michalovce.

== Career ==
Zubairu made his Fortuna Liga debut for AS Trenčín against Slovan Bratislava on 25 February 2016.

He played for AS Trenčín 7 consecutive seasons in the Slovak top tier, and in the summer of 2022, he moved to the region of former-Yugoslavia and joined the well-established Bosnian top-tier side HŠK Zrinjski. However, his stay was short, as he moved to Serbia in the following winter break to reinforce FK Kolubara which was struggling in its first-ever season at the top level.

== Style of play ==
A player who stands at just 1.65 m, Zubairu is known for his energy and ball-winning abilities as a box-to-box midfielder in the centre of the pitch. He is also a playmaker, and has been likened to N'Golo Kanté.
