= Matúš Kmeť =

Slovak footballer (born 2000)

Personal information
- Date of birth: 27 June 2000 (age 26)
- Place of birth: Ružomberok, Slovakia
- Height: 1.73 m (5 ft 8 in)
- Positions: Right-back; midfielder

Team information
- Current team: Baník Ostrava
- Number: 81

Youth career
- OŠK Ludrová
- 2011–2019: Ružomberok

Senior career*
| Years | Team | Apps | (Gls) |
| 2016–2020 | Ružomberok | 39 | (3) |
| 2019–2020 | Ružomberok B | 16 | (3) |
| 2020–2024 | AS Trenčín | 85 | (3) |
| 2021 | → Dubnica nad Váhom (loan) | 6 | (1) |
| 2024–2026 | Minnesota United | 0 | (0) |
| 2024 | Minnesota United 2 | 3 | (0) |
| 2025 | → Górnik Zabrze (loan) | 23 | (1) |
| 2025 | → Górnik Zabrze II (loan) | 1 | (0) |
| 2026 | → DAC Dunajská Streda (loan) | 13 | (2) |
| 2026– | Baník Ostrava | 0 | (0) |

International career^{‡}
| 2017 | Slovakia U17 | 9 | (0) |
| 2018 | Slovakia U18 | 1 | (0) |
| 2018 | Slovakia U19 | 6 | (3) |
| 2020 | Slovakia U20 | 1 | (0) |
| 2019–2022 | Slovakia U21 | 12 | (0) |
| 2025– | Slovakia | 1 | (0) |
- * Club domestic league appearances and goals as of 25 May 2026 ‡ National team caps and goals as of 11:05, 13 June 2025 (UTC)

Matúš Kmeť (born 27 June 2000) is a Slovak professional footballer who plays as a right-back or midfielder for Czech First League club Baník Ostrava and the Slovakia national team.

== Club career ==
Kmeť made his Fortuna Liga debut for Ružomberok against Žilina on 4 August 2018. He transferred to AS Trenčín in December 2020, signing a three-year contract. He made his debut on 20 February 2021 against FK Senica. On 5 August 2024, Kmeť transferred to Major League Soccer club Minnesota United on a two-and-a-half-year contract, with a one-year extension.

On 6 February 2025, after failing to make an appearance for Minnesota's first team, Kmeť joined Polish club Górnik Zabrze on loan until the end of the year, with an option to buy. The following year, on 3 February, he moved to DAC Dunajská Streda in Slovakia on loan for the remainder of the season.

On 2 July 2026, Kmeť signed a three-year contract with Czech First League club Baník Ostrava.

== International career ==
On 10 June 2025, Kmeť made his debut for the Slovakia national team in a 1–0 friendly loss against Israel.

== Career statistics ==
=== Club ===
As of match played 5 December 2025

Appearances and goals by club, season and competition
| Club | Season | League | | | National cup (Note: Includes Slovak Cup, Polish Cup) | | Continental | | Total | |
| Club | Season | Division | Apps | Goals | Apps | Goals | Apps | Goals | Apps | Goals |
|---|---|---|---|---|---|---|---|---|---|---|
| Ružomberok | 2016–17 | 1. liga | 0 | 0 | — | | — | | 0 | 0 |
| Ružomberok | 2017–18 | 1. liga | 0 | 0 | 0 | 0 | 0 | 0 | 0 | 0 |
| Ružomberok | 2018–19 | 1. liga | 15 | 0 | — | | — | | 15 | 0 |
| Ružomberok | 2019–20 | 1. liga | 7 | 1 | 4 | 0 | 0 | 0 | 11 | 1 |
| Ružomberok | 2020–21 | 1. liga | 17 | 2 | — | | 0 | 0 | 17 | 2 |
| Ružomberok | Total | | 39 | 3 | 4 | 0 | 0 | 0 | 43 | 3 |
| Ružomberok B | 2019–20 | 2. Liga | 16 | 3 | — | | — | | 16 | 3 |
| AS Trenčín | 2020–21 | 1. liga | 5 | 0 | 1 | 0 | — | | 6 | 0 |
| AS Trenčín | 2021–22 | 1. liga | 17 | 0 | 1 | 1 | — | | 18 | 1 |
| AS Trenčín | 2022–23 | 1. liga | 31 | 2 | 4 | 2 | — | | 35 | 4 |
| AS Trenčín | 2023–24 | 1. liga | 32 | 1 | 0 | 0 | — | | 32 | 1 |
| AS Trenčín | Total | | 85 | 3 | 6 | 3 | — | | 91 | 6 |
| Dubnica nad Váhom (loan) | 2021–22 | 2. Liga | 6 | 1 | — | | — | | 6 | 1 |
| Minnesota United | 2024 | MLS | 0 | 0 | — | | — | | 0 | 0 |
| Minnesota United 2 | 2024 | MLS Next Pro | 3 | 0 | — | | — | | 3 | 0 |
| Górnik Zabrze (loan) | 2024–25 | Ekstraklasa | 10 | 1 | — | | — | | 10 | 1 |
| Górnik Zabrze (loan) | 2025–26 | Ekstraklasa | 13 | 0 | 1 | 0 | — | | 14 | 0 |
| Górnik Zabrze (loan) | Total | | 23 | 1 | 1 | 0 | — | | 24 | 1 |
| Górnik Zabrze II (loan) | 2024–25 | III liga, gr. III | 1 | 0 | — | | — | | 1 | 0 |
| Career total | | | 173 | 11 | 11 | 3 | 0 | 0 | 184 | 14 |

=== International ===
As of match played 10 June 2025

Appearances and goals by national team and year
| National team | Year | Apps | Goals |
|---|---|---|---|
Slovakia
| Slovakia | 2025 | 1 | 0 |
| Total | | 1 | 0 |
