= Polydefkis Volanakis =

Greek footballer (born 2003)

Personal information
- Full name: Polydefkis Volanakis
- Date of birth: 25 April 2003 (age 23)
- Place of birth: Thessaloniki, Greece
- Height: 1.89 m (6 ft 2 in)
- Position: Centre-back

Team information
- Current team: Zemplín Michalovce
- Number: 5

Youth career
- –2020: Aris Thessaloniki
- 2020–2021: Zemplín Michalovce

Senior career*
Years	Team	Apps	(Gls)
2021–2025	Zemplín Michalovce	55	(2)
2025–2026	Widzew Łódź	8	(0)
2026–	Zemplín Michalovce	19	(1)
- * Club domestic league appearances and goals as of 21 September 2026

Polydefkis Volanakis (Greek: Πολυδεύκης Βολανάκης; born 25 April 2003) is a Greek professional footballer who plays as a centre-back for Slovak First Football League club Zemplín Michalovce.

== Career ==
=== Zemplín Michalovce ===
Volanakis made his Fortuna Liga debut for Zemplín Michalovce against Pohronie on 30 April 2022. He netted his first goal for Zemplín in the 50th minute of the match against AS Trenčín on 21 May 2022.

=== Widzew Łódź ===
On 16 January 2025, Volanakis was transferred to Polish Ekstraklasa club Widzew Łódź; he signed a two-and-a-half-year contract with a one-year extension option.

=== Return to Zemplín ===
On 25 February 2026, Volanakis left Widzew after not making a single appearance for the club in the 2025–26 season. Two days later, he rejoined Zemplín Michalovce on a deal until June 2028.
