= Hugo Ahl =

Swedish footballer (born 2001)

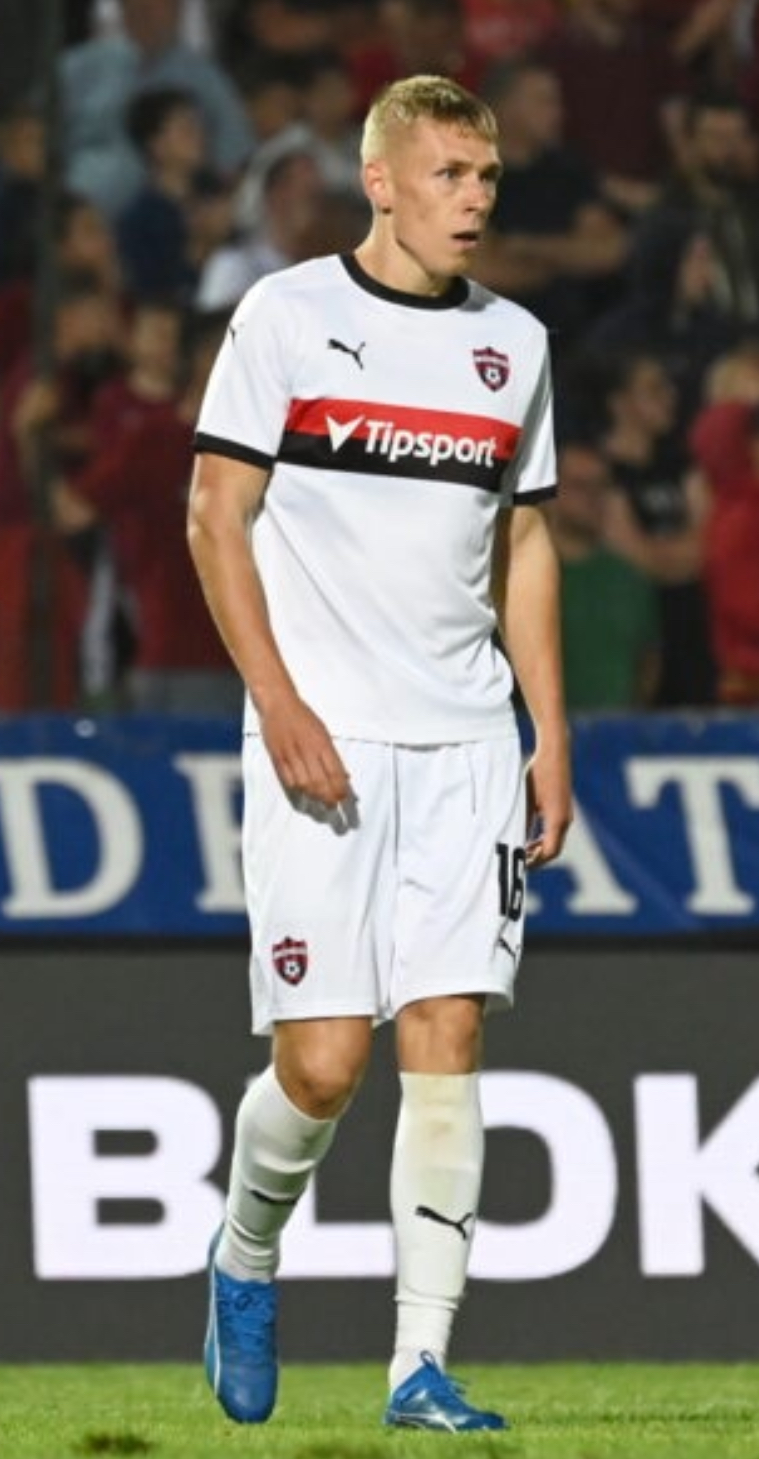
- Ahl in 2024

Personal information
- Full name: Nils Raul Hugo Ahl
- Date of birth: 16 October 2001 (age 25)
- Place of birth: Värnamo, Sweden
- Height: 1.88 m (6 ft 2 in)
- Position: Midfielder

Team information
- Current team: Jablonec
- Number: 16

Youth career
- –2017: IFK Värnamo

Senior career*
Years	Team	Apps	(Gls)
2017	Ljungby	14	(2)
2018	Värnamo Södra	14	(4)
2019	Dalstorp	25	(4)
2020	Ullared	12	(3)
2021	Torn	11	(1)
2021	Ytterhogdal	18	(4)
2022	Atmosfera	31	(7)
2023	DFK Dainava	1	(0)
2023–2024	Humenné	30	(10)
2024	Spartak Trnava	7	(0)
2025	Tatran Prešov	11	(2)
2025–2026	Michalovce	31	(10)
2026-	Jablonec	0	(0)
- * Club domestic league appearances and goals as of 26 May 2026

Nils Raul Hugo Ahl (born 16 October 2001) is a Swedish professional footballer who plays as a midfielder. He currently plays for FK Jablonec.

== Club career ==
He is a son of footballer Roger Ahl. Hugo Ahl grew up in Värnamo, but made his senior debut for Ljungby IF since his father managed the team at the time. From 2017 to 2020 he played one season each for Ljungby, Värnamo Södra FF, Dalstorps IF and Ullareds IK. He joined Torns IF in 2021, only to move on to Division 2 club Ytterhogdals IK in the summer of 2021.

=== Spartak Trnava ===
Spartak Trnava announced the signing of Ahl from Slovak second-league side Humenné in July 2024. Ahl made his league debut for Trnava against AS Trenčín in the goalless draw on 28 July 2024. On 1 December 2024, Ahl's contract was terminated in a mutual agreement with the club.

=== Tatran Prešov ===
On 31 January 2025, it was announced that Hugo Ahl would be joining Tatran Prešov.

=== Michalovce ===
On 27 June 2025, it was announced that Ahl would be joining Slovak side MFK Zemplín Michalovce. He made his debut for the club in a 1–1 draw against FC DAC 1904 Dunajská Streda, starting the game and eventually coming off as a substitute.
