= Ammar Ramadan =

Syrian footballer (born 2001)

Personal information
- Date of birth: 5 January 2001 (age 25)
- Place of birth: Idlib, Syria
- Height: 1.76 m (5 ft 9 in)
- Positions: Attacking midfielder; winger

Team information
- Current team: DAC Dunajská Streda
- Number: 10

Youth career
- 2005–2013: Jableh
- 2013–2014: Baniyas Refinery
- 2014–2015: Al Khor
- 2015–2016: Cimiano Calcio
- 2016–2019: Juventus
- 2019–2020: Ferencváros

Senior career*
Years	Team	Apps	(Gls)
2020–2022	Ferencváros	1	(0)
2021	→ Soroksár (loan)	17	(2)
2021–2022	→ Spartak Trnava (loan)	12	(0)
2022–	DAC Dunajská Streda	118	(37)

International career^{‡}
2014–2016	Syria U17	21	(10)
2017–2019	Syria U19	6	(4)
2021	Syria U23	3	(0)
2022–	Syria	23	(0)
- * Club domestic league appearances and goals as of 18 November 2026 ‡ National team caps and goals as of 5 June 2026

Ammar Ramadan (Arabic: عَمَّار رَمَضَان; born 5 January 2001) is a Syrian professional footballer who plays as an attacking midfielder or a winger for FC DAC 1904 Dunajská Streda in Niké liga and the Syria national team.

== Club career ==
=== Early career ===
Ramadan started his career at Jableh, then Baniyas Refinery in Syria, before joining Qatari side Al-Khor.

=== Youth clubs in Italy ===
Ramadan left Syria for Italy in October 2015, where he initially joined Cimiano Calcio, then he played for Juventus's youth team from 2016 to 2019, where he teamed up with players such as Moise Kean, Fabio Miretti and Nicolò Fagioli.

=== Ferencváros ===
In January 2019, he joined Hungarian side Ferencváros. On 23 June 2020, Ramadan played his first professional match for Ferencváros in a 1–0 defeat against Fehérvár. He later won the 2019–20 Nemzeti Bajnokság I with the club. However, he was excluded from the 29-man squad for the 2020–21 UEFA Champions League.

In 2021, he joined Soroksár and Spartak Trnava on loan, where he won the 2021–22 Slovak Cup with the latter.

=== DAC Dunajská Streda ===
After spending the summer break with DAC Dunajská Streda, Ramadan signed with the club on 22 July 2022 after impressing the staff led by Adrián Guľa. On 11 August 2022, he made his debut in European competitions by starting in a 1–0 away defeat against FCSB during the 2022–23 UEFA Europa Conference League third qualifying round.

On 13 July 2023, he scored a goal in a 2–1 win over Dila Gori in the first leg of the 2023–24 UEFA Europa Conference League first qualifying round, to become the first Syrian to score in that European competition. However, his club was eliminated with a 3–2 defeat on aggregate. A month later, on 23 August, he scored his first career hat-trick in a 5–1 away win over Gabčíkovo in the Slovak Cup.

On 21 February 2026, Ramadan scored a hat-trick in seven minutes in his 100th league match with the club, securing a 3–2 victory over Skalica.

== International career ==
Ramadan was part of Syria U19 national team during the 2018 and 2020 AFC U-19 Championship qualifications, scoring three goals in total, yet Syria were eliminated from the group stage in both competitions.

On 26 September 2022, he made his debut for Syria senior national team in a 1–0 defeat in a friendly match against Iraq. On 31 December 2023, he was named in the Syrian squad for the 2023 AFC Asian Cup in Qatar.

== Personal life ==
Ramadan's father, Munaf, was also a footballer.

== Career statistics ==
As of 18 November 2026

Appearances and goals by club, season and competition
Club	Season	League			Cup		Continental		Other		Total	
Club	Season	Division	Apps	Goals	Apps	Goals	Apps	Goals	Apps	Goals	Apps	Goals
Ferencváros	2019–20	Nemzeti Bajnokság I	1	0	0	0	0	0	—		1	0
Ferencváros	2020–21	Nemzeti Bajnokság I	0	0	1	0	0	0	—		1	0
Ferencváros	Total		1	0	1	0	—		—		2	0
Soroksár (loan)	2020–21	Nemzeti Bajnokság II	17	2	1	0	—		—		18	2
Spartak Trnava (loan)	2021–22	Fortuna Liga	12 (Note: 6 Appearances in the Championship group)	0	3	1	—		—		15	1
DAC Dunajská Streda	2022–23	Fortuna Liga	27 (Note: 7 Appearances in the Championship group)	4	3	1	1 (Note: Appearances in UEFA Europa Conference League)	0	—		31	5
DAC Dunajská Streda	2023–24	Niké liga	25 (Note: 5 Appearances in the Championship group)	3	3	4	2	1	—		30	8
DAC Dunajská Streda	2024–25	Niké liga	26 (Note: 9 Appearances in the Championship group)	9	2	0	1	0	2 (Note: UEFA Conference League play-offs)	2	31	11
DAC Dunajská Streda	2025–26	Niké liga	26 (Note: 5 Appearances in the Championship group)	11	3	2	—		—		29	13
DAC Dunajská Streda	2026–27	Niké liga	14	10	1	0	4	2	—		19	12
DAC Dunajská Streda	Total		118	37	11	7	8	3	2	2	140	49
Career total			148	39	17	8	8	3	2	2	175	52

=== International ===
As of match played 18 November 2025

Appearances and goals by national team and year
National team	Year	Apps	Goals
Syria
Syria	2022	1	0
Syria	2023	7	0
Syria	2024	10	0
Syria	2025	4	0
Total		22	0

== Honours ==
Ferencváros

- Nemzeti Bajnokság I: 2019–20

Spartak Trnava

- Slovak Cup: 2021–22
