= Kido Taylor-Hart =

English footballer

Personal information
- Full name: Kido Taylor-Hart
- Date of birth: 30 September 2002 (age 24)
- Place of birth: London, England
- Height: 1.80 m (5 ft 11 in)
- Position: Forward

Team information
- Current team: Zemplín Michalovce
- Number: 14

Youth career
- Focus Football
- Arsenal
- 2023: → Derby County (loan)

Senior career*
Years	Team	Apps	(Gls)
2023–2024	Arsenal	0	(0)
2023–2024	→ Bromley (loan)	9	(1)
2025	PAS Giannina	4	(0)
2025–	Zemplín Michalovce	45	(6)

International career^{‡}
2019	England U17	1	(0)
- * Club domestic league appearances and goals as of 21 September 2026 ‡ National team caps and goals as of 20:04, 20 August 2022 (UTC)

Kido Taylor-Hart (born 30 September 2002) is a professional footballer who plays as a forward for Zemplín Michalovce.

== Club career ==
Taylor-Hart started his career with Focus Football, while also training at a local project run by Premier League club Arsenal. At the age of seven, while playing for Focus Football, he was spotted by Arsenal scout Brian Stapleton, and invited to sign with The Gunners.

Having developed through the youth ranks at Arsenal, and establishing himself as one of the club's top prospects, Taylor-Hart was invited to train with the first team before he had signed a professional deal. He would go on to sign professional terms in August 2021.

On 31 January 2023, he joined Derby County's under-21 squad on loan until the end of the season.

On 4 September 2023, Taylor-Hart, along with Arsenal teammate Alex Kirk, joined National League club Bromley on a season-long loan deal.

Taylor-Hart was released by Arsenal at the end of the 2023–24 season following the expiration of his contract.

In January 2025, Taylor-Hart joined Super League Greece 2 club PAS Giannina on an eighteen-month contract. He was released on a free transfer on 6 February 2025. He made 4 appearances for the club.

On 13 February 2025, Taylor-Hart joined Slovak First Football League side Zemplín Michalovce on a free transfer, signing a two-and-a-half year deal.

On 1 March 2025, Taylor-Hart scored two goals in a game against FC Košice.

== International career ==
Taylor-Hart is eligible to represent England and Jamaica at international level. He has represented England at under-17 level.

== Career statistics ==
As of 20 August 2022.

Appearances and goals by club, season and competition
Club	Season	League			FA Cup		EFL Cup		Europe		Other		Total	
Club	Season	Division	Apps	Goals	Apps	Goals	Apps	Goals	Apps	Goals	Apps	Goals	Apps	Goals
Arsenal U21	2020–21	—			—		—		—		2 (Note: Appearance(s) in the EFL Trophy)	0	2	0
Arsenal U21	2021–22	—			—		—		—		3	0	3	0
Career total			0	0	0	0	0	0	0	0	5	0	5	0
