= Ben Cottrell =

English footballer (born 2001)

Personal information
- Full name: Ben Aaron Cottrell
- Date of birth: 31 October 2001 (age 25)
- Place of birth: Watford, England
- Height: 1.66 m (5 ft 5 in)
- Position: Midfielder

Team information
- Current team: Zemplín Michalovce
- Number: 80

Youth career
- 2010–2020: Arsenal

Senior career*
Years	Team	Apps	(Gls)
2020–2023	Arsenal	0	(0)
2023–2024	Mura	11	(0)
2024–	Zemplín Michalovce	44	(8)

International career
2016	England U16	1	(0)
2019	England U18	3	(0)
- * Club domestic league appearances and goals as of 21 September 2026

Ben Aaron Cottrell (born 31 October 2001) is an English professional footballer who plays as a midfielder for Slovak First Football League club Zemplín Michalovce.

== Club career ==
=== Arsenal ===
Born in Watford, Cottrell joined the academy of Premier League club Arsenal on 3 June 2010, at the age of eight. He progressed through the club's Hale End academy, where his performances drew interest from German and French sides, Borussia Dortmund and Marseille, respectively. He signed his first professional contract with the club in July 2019.

Cottrell made his unofficial debut in Arsenal's 4–1 pre-season friendly win against Milton Keynes Dons; coming on as a second-half substitute for Kieran Tierney, he impressed in an unnatural left wing-back position. Later in the same season, he was included in Arsenal's senior squad ahead of a UEFA Europa League fixture against Norwegian opposition Molde, alongside fellow academy graduate Miguel Azeez. Despite not featuring in Arsenal's 3–0 win, he remained on manager Mikel Arteta's radar, and made his professional debut in Arsenal's 4–2 win against Irish side Dundalk on 10 December 2020, coming on as a second-half substitute for Emile Smith Rowe.

Having been ruled out for most of the 2021–22 season, only playing in two games, he returned to regular action the following year, but found first-team opportunities limited, despite impressing in the Premier League 2.

=== Mura ===
In August 2023, he completed a permanent transfer to Slovenian side Mura, becoming the first Englishman to play for the club.

=== Zemplín Michalovce ===
On 9 December 2024, Cottrell joined Slovak First Football League club Zemplín Michalovce on a two-and-a-half year deal, once again becoming the first Englishman to represent the club. He scored his first goal for Zemplín in a 4:2 loss against MFK Skalica.

== Career statistics ==
=== Club ===
As of match played 12 May 2024

Appearances and goals by club, season and competition
Club	Season	League			National Cup		League Cup		Europe		Other		Total	
Club	Season	Division	Apps	Goals	Apps	Goals	Apps	Goals	Apps	Goals	Apps	Goals	Apps	Goals
Arsenal U21	2019–20	—	—		—		—		—		2 (Note: Appearances in the EFL Trophy)	0	2	0
Arsenal U21	2020–21	—	—		—		—		—		4	0	4	0
Arsenal U21	2021–22	—	—		—		—		—		0	0	0	0
Arsenal U21	2022–23	—	—		—		—		—		0	0	0	0
Arsenal U21	Total		0	0	0	0	0	0	0	0	6	0	6	0
Arsenal	2020–21	Premier League	0	0	0	0	0	0	1 (Note: Appearances in the UEFA Europa League)	0	0	0	1	0
Arsenal	2021–22	Premier League	0	0	0	0	0	0	0	0	0	0	0	0
Arsenal	2022–23	Premier League	0	0	0	0	0	0	0	0	0	0	0	0
Arsenal	Total		0	0	0	0	0	0	1	0	0	0	1	0
Mura	2023–24	Slovenian PrvaLiga	11	0	2	0	–		–		0	0	13	0
Career total			11	0	2	0	0	0	1	0	6	0	20	0
