= Tornike Dzotsenidze =

Georgian footballer (born 1999)

Personal information
- Full name: Tornike Dzotsenidze
- Date of birth: 7 November 1999 (age 27)
- Place of birth: Tbilisi, Georgia
- Height: 1.87 m (6 ft 2 in)
- Position: Centre-back

Team information
- Current team: Zemplín Michalovce
- Number: 26

Youth career
- Dinamo Tbilisi

Senior career*
Years	Team	Apps	(Gls)
2018–2019	Dinamo Tbilisi	3	(0)
2019–2021	Telavi	57	(2)
2022–2023	Dila Gori	47	(3)
2024–	Zemplín Michalovce	71	(2)

International career^{‡}
2020	Georgia U21	1	(0)
- * Club domestic league appearances and goals as of 21 September 2026 ‡ National team caps and goals as of 12 November 2020

Tornike Dzotsenidze (Georgian: თორნიკე ძოწენიძე; born 7 November 1999) is a Georgian footballer who currently plays for Niké Liga club Zemplín Michalovce as centre-back.

== Club career ==
Dzotsenidze is a product of the youth academy of Dinamo Tbilisi. He made three appearances for the senior team before joining Erovnuli Liga 2 side Telavi in 2019. Dzotsenidze spent two more seasons at Telavi in the top flight and moved to Dila on a three-year deal, making six appearances in UEFA European football in the summer of 2023.

On 27 January 2024, it was announced that Dzotsenidze would be joining Slovak club Zemplín Michalovce on a free transfer. He made his Slovak league debut for Zemplín Michalovce in an away fixture against FK Železiarne Podbrezová on 10 February 2024. Dzotsenidze scored his debut Slovak league goal in a 2–2 draw against the same opponents a year later.

Following the 2025–26 season, he was named in Team of the Season.

== International ==
Dzotsenidze was called up to the U21 team for a friendly tie against Azerbaijan in September 2020. He took part in a 2021 UEFA European Championship qualifying game against Slovakia two months later.

== Career statistics ==
As of match played 16 May 2026

Appearances and goals by club, season and competition
Club	Season	League			National cup (Note: Includes Georgian Cup, Slovak Cup)		Continental		Other		Total	
Club	Season	Division	Apps	Goals	Apps	Goals	Apps	Goals	Apps	Goals	Apps	Goals
Dinamo Tbilisi	2018	Erovnuli Liga	3	0	0	0	0	0	—		3	0
Dinamo Tbilisi	2019	Erovnuli Liga	0	0	1	0	0	0	—		1	0
Dinamo Tbilisi	Total		3	0	1	0	0	0	—		4	0
Telavi	2019	Erovnuli Liga 2	16	1	0	0	—		2 (Note: Appearance(s) in Erovnuli Promotion/Relegation play-offs)	1	18	2
Telavi	2020	Erovnuli Liga	14	1	0	0	—		—		14	1
Telavi	2021	Erovnuli Liga	27	0	2	0	—		—		29	0
Telavi	Total		57	2	2	0	—		2	1	61	3
Dila Gori	2022	Erovnuli Liga	21	2	2	0	0	0	—		23	2
Dila Gori	2023	Erovnuli Liga	26	1	1	0	6 (Note: Appearance(s) in UEFA Europa Conference League)	0	2 (Note: Appearance(s) in Georgian Super Cup)	0	35	1
Dila Gori	Total		47	3	3	0	6	0	2	0	58	3
Zemplín Michalovce	2023-24	Slovak 1st League	14	0	1	0	—		2 (Note: Appearance(s) in Slovak 1st League Relegation play-offs)	0	17	0
Zemplín Michalovce	2024-25	Slovak 1st League	25	1	2	0	—		—		27	1
Zemplín Michalovce	2025-26	Slovak 1st League	24	1	1	0	—		—		25	1
Zemplín Michalovce	Total		63	2	4	0	—		2	0	69	2
Career total			170	7	10	0	6	0	6	1	192	8

== Honours ==
- Slovak 1st League Team of the Season: 2025–26
