= Gytis Paulauskas =

Lithuanian footballer

Personal information
- Date of birth: 27 September 1999 (age 27)
- Place of birth: Vilnius, Lithuania
- Height: 1.96 m (6 ft 5 in)
- Position: Forward

Team information
- Current team: Jeonbuk Hyundai Motors (on loan from Jeju SK)
- Number: 81

Youth career
- –2015: Vilniaus FM
- 2015–2017: Žalgiris
- 2017–2018: Vilniaus Vytis

Senior career*
Years	Team	Apps	(Gls)
2017	Žalgiris B	1	(0)
2017–2020	Vilniaus Vytis	51	(6)
2020–2023	Riteriai B	6	(3)
2020–2023	Riteriai	81	(13)
2023–2024	Egnatia	34	(5)
2024–2025	Kolos Kovalivka	21	(1)
2025	→ Dinamo Batumi (loan)	15	(4)
2025–2026	Zemplín Michalovce	15	(6)
2026–	Jeju SK	7	(0)
2026–	→ Jeonbuk Hyundai Motors (loan)	7	(1)

International career^{‡}
2019–2020	Lithuania U21	4	(0)
2020–	Lithuania	28	(2)
- * Club domestic league appearances and goals as of 10 September 2026 ‡ National team caps and goals as of 18:59, 10 January 2026 (UTC)

Gytis Paulauskas (born 27 September 1999) is a Lithuanian professional footballer who plays as a forward for K League 1 club Jeonbuk Hyundai Motors, on loan from Jeju SK club and the Lithuania national team.

== International career ==
Paulauskas made his international debut for Lithuania on 7 October 2020 in a friendly match against Estonia. He scored his first international goal on 7 September 2023 against Montenegro in their 2–2 draw in Euro Qualifiers.

== Career statistics ==
=== International ===
As of match played 12 October 2025

Appearances and goals by national team and year
National team	Year	Apps	Goals
Lithuania
Lithuania	2020	1	0
Lithuania	2023	10	2
Lithuania	2024	10	0
Lithuania	2025	7	0
Total		28	2

Scores and results list Lithuania's goal tally first, score column indicates score after each Paulauskas goal.

List of international goals scored by Gytis Paulauskas
No.	Date	Venue	Opponent	Score	Result	Competition
1	7 September 2023	Darius and Girėnas Stadium, Kaunas, Lithuania	Montenegro	1–0	2–2	UEFA Euro 2024 qualification
2	10 September 2023	Darius and Girėnas Stadium, Kaunas, Lithuania	Serbia	1–3	1–3	UEFA Euro 2024 qualification
