= Martin Bednár =

Slovak footballer

Personal information
- Full name: Martin Bednár
- Date of birth: 22 April 1999 (age 27)
- Place of birth: Prešov, Slovakia
- Height: 1.87 m (6 ft 2 in)
- Positions: Defensive midfielder; centre-back

Team information
- Current team: Zemplín Michalovce
- Number: 66

Youth career
- 2008–2012: Tatran Prešov
- 2012–2013: FAMT Prešov
- 2013–2018: Zemplín Michalovce

Senior career*
Years	Team	Apps	(Gls)
2015–2018	Zemplín Michalovce	28	(1)
2018–2021	DAC Dunajská Streda	23	(1)
2020–2021	→ Zemplín Michalovce (loan)	18	(1)
2021–2023	ViOn Zlaté Moravce	50	(0)
2023–	Zemplín Michalovce	84	(2)

International career^{‡}
- Slovakia U15
- Slovakia U16
	Slovakia U17	2	(0)
	Slovakia U18	1	(0)
- Slovakia U19
2018	Slovakia U20	2	(0)
2019–2020	Slovakia U21	5	(0)
- * Club domestic league appearances and goals as of 21 September 2026 ‡ National team caps and goals as of 17 November 2020

Martin Bednár (born 22 April 1999) is a Slovak professional footballer who plays as a midfielder for MFK Zemplín Michalovce.

== Club career ==
=== Zemplín Michalovce ===
Bednár made his Fortuna Liga debut for Zemplín Michalovce in an away fixture against ŽP Šport Podbrezová on 1 August 2015 at the age of 16. He came on as a stoppage time replacement for Jozef-Šimon Turík. Michalovce lost the game 6–2.
