= MFK Zemplín Michalovce =

Slovak football club

Zemplín Michalovce
- Full name: MFK Zemplín Michalovce a.s.
- Nicknames: Zemplínčania (The Zemplicians); Žltomodrí (Yellow-blues)
- Founded: 1912; 114 years ago (as NAC Michalovce)
- Ground: Mestský futbalový štadión, Michalovce
- Capacity: 4,440
- Chairman: Ján Sabol
- Head coach: Anton Šoltis
- League: Slovak First Football League
- 2025–26: 5th of 12
- Website: www.mfkzemplin.sk
Home colours	Away colours

MFK Zemplín Michalovce (Slovak pronunciation: [ˈzempliːm ˈmixalɔwtse]) is a Slovak professional football team based in the town of Michalovce, that competes in the Slovak First Football League, the top tier in the Slovak league system, from 2015–16.

== History ==
Zemplín Michalovce was formed in 1912. Football in Michalovce first played in the summer of 1912, where Michalovce loss against FK Pozdišovce 0–6. The second club, which was based in Michalovce is called NAC Michalovce (Nagymihályi athlétikai club) in 1914. On 13 June 2015, they defeated their main rival MFK Skalica in a decisive match 2–0 away win, secured their first place and a historic promotion to the Fortuna Liga.

=== Events timeline ===
- 1912 – Founded as Michalovský FS (Michalovský futbalový spolok)
- 1914 – Renamed Nagymihályi AC (Nagymihályi athleticai club)
- 1922 – Merged with ČsŠK Michalovce to Michalovský AC (Michalovský atletický club)
- 1926 – Renamed ŠK Michalovce (Športový klub Michalovce)
- Former logo
  1928 – Merged with Törökvés Michalovce to ŠK Snaha Michalovce
- 1931 – Renamed FAK Michalovce (Futbalový a atletický klub Michalovce)
- 1938 – Renamed ŠK Zemplín Michalovce (Športový klub Zemplín Michalovce)
- 1945 - Renamed TJ Zemplín Vihorlat Michalovce (Telovýchovná jednota Zemplín Vihorlat Michalovce)
- 1991 - Renamed MFK Zemplín Michalovce (Mestský futbalový klub Zemplín Michalovce)

== Honours ==
=== Domestic ===
Czechoslovakia

- 1.SNL (1st Slovak National football league) (1969–93)
  - Winners (1): 1974–75

Slovakia

- Slovak Second Division (1993–)
  - Winners (1): 2014–15 (Promoted)
  - Runners-up (1): 2013–14
- Slovak Cup (1961–present)
  - Semi-finals (1): 2016–17

== Affiliated clubs ==
The following clubs are affiliated with Zemplín Michalovce:

- (Italy) AC Milan (2011–present)
- (Slovakia) FK Sobrance-Sobranecko (2020–present)

== Rivalries ==
MFK Zemplín's biggest rivals are clubs from eastern Slovakia as 1. FC Tatran Prešov, Partizán Bardejov, FK Bodva, FK Humenné and near TJ FK Veľké Revištia. Smaller rivalry is with other teams from the east, Lokomotíva Košice, MFK Vranov nad Topľou, FK Slavoj Trebišov, FK Spišská Nová Ves, ŠK Odeva Lipany. MFK Zemplín Michalovce supporters called Ultras Zemplín Michalovce (GS-52) maintain friendly relations with fans of VSS Košice called as Viva Košice.

== Transfers ==
MFK have produced numerous players that have gone on to represent the Slovak national football team. The top transfer was agreed in 2025 when 19 years old tallented midfielder Artúr Musák moved to Czech Baník Ostrava for a fee €700.000.

=== Record transfers ===
Rank	Player	To	Fee	Year
1.	(Hungary) Artúr Musák	(Czech Republic) Baník Ostrava	€700.000	2025
2.	(Slovakia) Matej Trusa	(Czech Republic) Viktoria Plzeň	€500.000	2022
3.	(Slovakia) Adam Žulevič	(Italy) Genoa U20	€450.000	2025
4.	(Lithuania) Gytis Paulauskas	(South Korea) Jeju SK	€400.000	2026
5.	(Greece) Lazaros Rota	(Netherlands) Fortuna Sittard	€200.000	2019
5.	(Sweden) Hugo Ahl	(Czech Republic) FK Jablonec	€200.000	2026

*-unofficial fee

== Sponsorship ==
Period	Kit manufacturer	Shirt sponsor
2004–05	ATAK Sportswear	SPORT EXPRES
2005–06	ATAK Sportswear	none
2006–09	Macron	Scorp
2009–10	Jako	Scorp
2010–12	Nike	Scorp
2012–14	Joma	Scorp
2014–2017	Adidas	Scorp
2018	Adidas	ISDB
2019–2020	Adidas	ISDB, St. Nicolaus
2020-2022	Adidas	St. Nicolaus, Scorp
2022-	Adidas	St. Nicolaus, Tipsport

=== Club partners ===
- Scorp
- ISDB
- Eurovia
- City of Michalovce
- Thermal Park Šírava
- Bel
- FIN.M.O.S.

== Current squad ==
As of 15 September 2026 Note: Flags indicate national team as defined under FIFA eligibility rules; some limited exceptions apply. Players may hold more than one non-FIFA nationality.

No.	Pos.	Nation	Player
1	GK	SVK	Patrik Lukáč
3	DF	SVK	Martin Koscelník
4	MF	NGR	Abdul Zubairu
5	DF	GRE	Polydefkis Volanakis
7	MF	ENG	Kai Brosnan
8	MF	ENG	Tommy Pilling
9	FW	POL	Tomasz Walczak
11	FW	MEX	José Ángel López
12	DF	GUI	Franck Bahi
14	MF	ENG	Kido Taylor-Hart
16	GK	SVK	Adam Jakubech
18	FW	GRE	Vasilios Theofanopoulos
20	FW	UKR	Luka Lemishko
21	MF	GRE	Konstantinos Oikonomou

No.	Pos.	Nation	Player
22	MF	SVK	Patrik Danek
25	DF	SVK	Lukáš Pauschek
26	DF	GEO	Tornike Dzotsenidze
27	DF	SVK	Matej Čurma
31	MF	EST	Nikita Mihhailov
42	MF	GRE	Orestis Kalemi
47	FW	ALG	Noa Cervantes
66	MF	SVK	Martin Bednár
69	GK	SVK	Matej Dula
70	MF	SVK	Rastislav Korba
77	DF	KOR	Park Tae-rang
80	MF	ENG	Ben Cottrell
90	FW	SVK	Oleg Záhradník
99	FW	COD	Elvis Mashike

For recent transfers, see List of Slovak football transfers summer 2026

=== Out on loan ===
Note: Flags indicate national team as defined under FIFA eligibility rules; some limited exceptions apply. Players may hold more than one non-FIFA nationality.

No. / Pos. / Nation / Player; 19 / MF / SVK / Dávid Petrik (on loan to FK Humenné)	No. / Pos. / Nation / Player

== Staff ==
=== Current technical staff ===
As of 19 February 2024

Staff	Job title
(Slovakia) Anton Šoltis	Manager
(Slovakia) Patrik Durkáč	Assistant manager
(Slovakia) Maroš Ferenc	Goalkeeping coach
(Slovakia) Dávid Gubaňar	Team Leader
(Slovakia) MUDr. Jozef Petrík	Team Doctor
(Slovakia) Marek Mager	Masseur
(Slovakia) Gabriel Csörgö	Fitness Coach
(Slovakia) Veronika Dolutovská	Physiotherapist

== Results ==
=== League and Cup history ===
Slovak League only (1993–present)

Year	Division (name)	Position	Domestic cup	Top scorer (goals)
2003–04	(III) 2. liga	2nd (promoted)	did not enter	(Slovakia) Miroslav Tóth (28)
2004–05	(II) 1. liga	4th	Round 1	(Slovakia) Miroslav Tóth (10)
2005–06	(II) 1. liga	7th	Round 1	(Ukraine) Artem Yevlyanov (7)
2006–07	(II) 1. liga	2nd (Relegation playoff)	Round 3	(Slovakia) Maroš Bačík (8)
2007–08	(II) 1. liga	9th	Round 1	(Georgia (country)) Irakli Liluashvili (7)
2008–09	(II) 1. liga	9th	Round 3	(Slovakia) Jozef Gašpar (11)
2009–10	(II) 1. liga	6th	Round 1	(Ukraine) Ruslan Lyubarskyi (9)
2010–11	(II) 1. liga	4th	Round 2	(Slovakia) Filip Serečin (17)
2011–12	(II) 2. liga	6th	Round 2	
2012–13	(II) 2. liga	5th	Round 1	(Slovakia) Pavol Jurčo (8)
2013–14	(II) 2. liga	2nd	Round 3	(Slovakia) Michal Hamuľak (26)
2014–15	(II) DOXXbet Liga	1st (promoted)	Round 4	(Spain) Samuel Bayón (18)
2015–16	(I) Fortuna Liga	11th	Round 4	(Slovakia) Dominik Kunca (7)
2016–17	(I) Fortuna Liga	8th	Semi-finals	(Slovakia) Igor Žofčák (7)
2017–18	(I) Fortuna Liga	9th	Round 5	(Slovakia) Martin Koscelník (8)
2018–19	(I) Fortuna Liga	5th	Semi–finals	(Slovakia) Peter Kolesár (5) (Slovakia) Igor Žofčák (5)
2019–20	(I) Fortuna Liga	6th	Round 3	(Niger) Issa Modibo Sidibé (8)
2020–21	(I) Fortuna Liga	10th	Round 4	(Slovakia) Igor Žofčák (6)
2021–22	(I) Fortuna Liga	9th	Round 4	(Slovakia) Matej Trusa (6)
2022–23	(I) Fortuna Liga	9th	Round 5	(Slovakia) Matúš Marcin (7)
2023–24	(I) Niké Liga	11th	Quarter-finals	(Slovakia) Matúš Marcin (10)
2024–25	(I) Niké Liga	7th	Round of 16	(Greece) Alexandros Kyziridis (15)
2025–26	(I) Niké Liga	5th	Round of 16	(Sweden) Hugo Ahl (10)

== Player records ==
=== Most goals ===
#	Nat.	Name	Goals
1	(Slovakia)	Michal Hamuľak	41
2	(Slovakia)	Igor Žofčák	34
3	(Slovakia)	Matúš Marcin	27
4	(Slovakia)	Dominik Kunca	26
5	(Slovakia)	**Martin Koscelník**	20
5	(Spain)	Samuel Bayón	20
6	(Slovakia)	Martin Regáli	19

Players whose name is listed in bold are still active.

== Notable players ==
The following players collected seniorinternational caps for their respective countries. Players whose name is listed in bold represented their countries while playing for Zemplín.

Past (and present) players who are the subjects of Wikipedia articles can be found here.

- (Burkina Faso) Amadou Coulibaly
- (Slovakia) Vernon De Marco
- (Slovakia) Pavol Diňa
- (Nicaragua) Pablo Gállego
- (Slovakia) Andrej Hesek
- (Slovakia) Jakub Hromada
- (Slovakia) Adam Jakubech
- (Lithuania) Eligijus Jankauskas
- (Slovakia) Vladimír Janočko
- (Georgia (country)) Akaki Khubutia
- (Slovakia) Martin Koscelník
- (Curaçao) Doriano Kortstam
- (Slovakia) Juraj Kotula
- (Vietnam) Patrik Le Giang
- (Nigeria) Kingsley Madu
- (The Gambia) **Sainey Njie**
- (Greece) Alexandros Kyziridis
- (Lithuania) Gytis Paulauskas
- (Slovakia) Lukáš Pauschek
- (Czech Republic) Martin Raška
- (Slovakia) Martin Regáli
- (Greece) Spyros Risvanis
- (Greece) Lazaros Rota
- (Mauritania) Ousmane Samba
- (Niger) **Issa Modibo Sidibé**
- (Slovakia) Miroslav Seman
- (Cyprus) Danilo Špoljarić
- (Slovakia) Dušan Sninský
- (Slovakia) Michal Škvarka
- (Curaçao) Gino van Kessel
- (Collectivity of Saint Martin) Kévin Zonzon
- (Slovakia) Igor Žofčák
- (Slovakia) Matúš Marcin

== Managers ==
- (Czechoslovakia) Štefan Nadzam (1973–77)
- (Czechoslovakia) Štefan Nadzam (1981–87)
- (Slovakia) Ján Kozák (2002–03)
- (Slovakia) Jozef Škrlík (2004)
- (Slovakia) Ján Karaffa (2005)
- (Slovakia) Ladislav Molnár (2006)
- (Slovakia) Mikuláš Komanický (2008–09)
- (Slovakia) Vladimír Rusnák (2009–10)
- (Czech Republic) Vlastimil Petržela (2010–12)
- (Slovakia) Albert Rusnák (2012–14)
- (Slovakia) Jozef Bubenko (2013)
- (Slovakia) Ondrej Duda (2014)
- (Czech Republic) František Šturma (2014 – 30 December 2015)
- (Slovakia) Stanislav Griga (30 Dec 2015 – 30 May 2016)
- (Slovakia) Anton Šoltis (7 June 2016 – 11 November 2019)
- (Slovakia) Jozef Majoroš (11 Nov 2019–13 April 2021)
- (Slovakia) Anton Šoltis (April 2021 – June 2021)
- (Slovakia) Miroslav Nemec (June 2021 – March 2022)
- (Slovakia) Norbert Hrnčár (March 2022 – May 2023)
- (Slovakia) Vladimír Rusnák (May 2023) (interim)
- (Slovakia) Marek Petruš (June 2023 – September 2023)
- (Slovakia) Peter Struhár (September 2023 – Feb 2024)
- (Czech Republic) František Straka (Feb 2024–July 2024)
- (Slovakia) Anton Šoltis (July 2024 – present)
