= 2025–26 ŠK Slovan Bratislava season =

ŠK Slovan Bratislava
2025–26 season
- Manager: Vladimír Weiss
- Stadium: Tehelné pole
- Slovak 1st League: 1st
- Slovak Cup: Round of 16
- UEFA Champions League: Third qualifying round
- UEFA Europa League: Play-off round
- UEFA Conference League: League phase
- Top goalscorer: League: Andraž Šporar (12); All: Andraž Šporar (12)
- Highest home attendance: 21,005 v Kairat (12 Aug 2025, UEFA Champions League)
- Lowest home attendance: 3,119 v Ružomberok (3 Dec 2025, Slovak 1st League)
Home colours	Away colours	Third colours

The 2025–26 season was the 107th season in the history of ŠK Slovan Bratislava, and the club's 20th consecutive season in Slovak First League. In addition to the domestic league, the club participated in the Slovak Cup, the UEFA Champions League, the UEFA Europa League and the UEFA Conference League, after winning the Slovak League title for the seventh time in a row.

== Players ==
As of 16 May 2026

Squad No.	Name	Nationality	Position(s)	Date of birth (age)	Signed from / Previous club	Since
Goalkeepers
31	Martin Trnovský	(Slovakia)	GK	7 June 2000 (aged 25)	Youth system	2019
44	Matúš Macík	(Slovakia)	GK	19 May 1993 (aged 32)	(Czech Republic) Sigma Olomouc	2025
71	Dominik Takáč	(Slovakia)	GK	12 January 1999 (aged 27)	(Slovakia) Spartak Trnava	2024
Defenders
4	Guram Kashia	(Georgia (country))	CB	4 July 1987 (aged 38)	(Georgia (country)) Locomotive Tbilisi	2021
6	Kevin Wimmer	(Austria)	CB / LB	15 November 1992 (aged 33)	(Austria) Rapid Wien	2023
12	Kenan Bajrić	(Slovenia)	CB / DM	20 December 1994 (aged 31)	(Slovenia) Olimpija Ljubljana	2018
15	Svetozar Marković	(Serbia)	CB	23 March 2000 (aged 26)	(Czech Republic) Viktoria Plzeň	2026
19	Sidoine Fogning	(Cameroon)	CB	14 November 2001 (aged 24)	(Portugal) Boavista (loan)	2025
23	Sharani Zuberu	(Ghana)	LB / LW / RW / ST	7 January 2000 (aged 26)	(Ghana) Dreams	2023
28	César Blackman	(Panama)	RB / RW	2 April 1998 (aged 28)	(Slovakia) DAC Dunajská Streda	2023
57	Sandro Cruz	(Angola)	LB	12 May 2001 (aged 25)	(Portugal) Gil Vicente	2025
—	Jurij Medveděv (out on loan at (Slovakia) Tatran Prešov)	(Czech Republic) (Kazakhstan)	RB	18 June 1996 (aged 29)	(Russia) Sochi	2024
Midfielders
3	Peter Pokorný	(Slovakia)	DM / CM / CB	8 August 2001 (aged 24)	(Poland) Śląsk Wrocław	2025
5	Rahim Ibrahim	(Ghana)	CM	10 June 2001 (aged 24)	(Slovakia) Trenčín	2025
7	Vladimír Weiss Jr. (captain)	(Slovakia)	LW / RW / CAM	30 November 1989 (aged 36)	(Qatar) Al-Gharafa	2020
8	Artur Gajdoš	(Slovakia)	CAM	20 January 2004 (aged 22)	(Slovakia) Trenčín	2024
10	Niko Janković	(Croatia)	CAM / LW / RW	25 August 2001 (aged 24)	(Croatia) Rijeka (loan)	2026
11	Tigran Barseghyan	(Armenia)	RW / LW	22 September 1993 (aged 32)	(Kazakhstan) Astana	2022
16	Maxim Mateáš	(Slovakia)	CM	12 May 2008 (aged 18)	Youth system	2024
18	Nino Marcelli	(Slovakia)	LW / RW	29 May 2005 (aged 20)	Youth system	2023
41	Daiki Matsuoka	(Japan)	CM / DM	1 June 2001 (aged 24)	(Japan) Avispa Fukuoka (loan)	2026
77	Danylo Ihnatenko	(Ukraine)	CM / DM / CB	13 March 1997 (aged 29)	(France) Bordeaux	2024
—	Filip Lichý (out on loan at (Slovakia) Košice)	(Slovakia)	CM / DM / CB	25 January 2001 (aged 25)	Youth system	2020
—	Alen Mustafić (out on loan at (Slovakia) Komárno)	(Bosnia and Herzegovina)	CM	5 July 1999 (aged 26)	(Denmark) OB	2024
—	Kelvin Ofori (out on loan at (Slovenia) Olimpija Ljubljana)	(Ghana)	RW / LW / CAM	27 July 2001 (aged 24)	(Slovakia) Spartak Trnava	2025
Forwards
9	Mykola Kukharevych	(Ukraine)	ST	7 July 2001 (aged 24)	(Wales) Swansea City	2025
14	Alasana Yirajang	(The Gambia)	LW / RW / ST	12 November 2004 (aged 21)	(Slovakia) Podbrezová	2025
21	Róbert Mak	(Slovakia)	LW / RW / ST	8 March 1991 (aged 35)	(Australia) Sydney FC	2024
30	Adam Griger	(Slovakia)	ST	16 March 2004 (aged 22)	(Czech Republic) Hradec Králové (loan)	2026
99	Andraž Šporar	(Slovenia)	ST	27 February 1994 (aged 32)	(Turkey) Alanyaspor	2025

== Transfers and loans ==
=== Transfers in ===
Date	Position	Nationality	Name	From / Previous club	Fee	Ref.
6 June 2025	FW	(Ghana)	Kelvin Ofori	(Slovakia) Spartak Trnava	Free transfer	
17 June 2025	FW	(Ukraine)	Mykola Kukharevych	(Wales) Swansea City	€800,000	
17 June 2025	MF	(Slovakia)	Peter Pokorný	(Poland) Śląsk Wrocław	Free transfer	
20 June 2025	FW	(The Gambia)	Alasana Yirajang	(Slovakia) Podbrezová	€900,000	
27 June 2025	DF	(Angola)	Sandro Cruz	(Portugal) Gil Vicente	Undisclosed	
30 June 2025	MF	(Slovakia)	Artur Gajdoš	(Slovakia) Trenčín	Loan return	
30 June 2025	MF	(Slovakia)	Filip Lichý	(Czech Republic) Dukla Prague	Loan return	
1 September 2025	FW	(Slovenia)	Andraž Šporar	(Turkey) Alanyaspor	Free transfer	
14 January 2026	DF	(Serbia)	Svetozar Marković	(Czech Republic) Viktoria Plzeň	€800,000	

=== Loans in ===
Start date	Position	Nationality	Name	From	End date	Ref.
4 August 2025	DF	(Cameroon)	Sidoine Fogning	(Portugal) Boavista	30 June 2026	
5 February 2026	FW	(Slovakia)	Adam Griger	(Czech Republic) Hradec Králové	31 December 2026	
5 February 2026	MF	(Croatia)	Niko Janković	(Croatia) Rijeka	31 January 2027	
7 February 2026	MF	(Japan)	Daiki Matsuoka	(Japan) Avispa Fukuoka	30 June 2026	

=== Transfers out ===
Date	Position	Nationality	Name	To / Next club	Fee	Ref.
30 June 2025	MF	(Slovakia)	Juraj Kucka	End of contract		
	MF	(Slovakia)	Juraj Kucka	(Slovakia) Baník Prievidza	Free transfer	
10 June 2025	MF	(Slovakia)	Július Szöke	(Cyprus) AEL Limassol	€180,000	
24 June 2025	GK	(Slovakia)	Andrej Mikoláš	(Slovakia) Malženice	Free transfer	
30 June 2025	FW	(Togo)	Idjessi Metsoko	(Czech Republic) Viktoria Plzeň	Loan return	
30 June 2025	DF	(Slovakia)	Lukáš Pauschek	End of contract		
	DF	(Slovakia)	Lukáš Pauschek	(Slovakia) Zemplín Michalovce	Free transfer	
30 June 2025	DF	(Belgium)	Siemen Voet	End of contract		
	DF	(Belgium)	Siemen Voet	(Germany) 1860 Munich	Free transfer	
30 June 2025	DF	(Slovakia)	Matúš Vojtko	End of contract		
	DF	(Slovakia)	Matúš Vojtko	(Poland) Lechia Gdańsk	Free transfer	
1 September 2025	FW	(Switzerland)	Adler Da Silva	End of contract		
1 September 2025	FW	(Slovakia)	David Strelec	(England) Middlesbrough	€7,500,000 (Note: Fee may have eventually risen up to €10,000,000 with achievable bonuses.) (Note: At that time, the most expensive transfer in the history of the club and the Slovak league.)	
5 February 2026	MF	(Croatia)	Marko Tolić	(China) Zhejiang	Free transfer	
25 February 2026	MF	(Greece)	Kyriakos Savvidis	(Poland) Wisła Płock	Undisclosed	

=== Loans out ===
Start date	Position	Nationality	Name	To	End date	Ref.
15 January 2026	MF	(Ghana)	Kelvin Ofori	(Slovenia) Olimpija Ljubljana	30 June 2026	
2 February 2026	MF	(Slovakia)	Filip Lichý	(Slovakia) Košice	30 June 2026	
22 February 2026	DF	(Czech Republic)	Jurij Medveděv	(Slovakia) Tatran Prešov	30 June 2026	
22 February 2026	MF	(Bosnia and Herzegovina)	Alen Mustafić	(Slovakia) Komárno	30 June 2026	

== Friendlies ==
Win Draw Loss

=== Pre-season ===
Mon, 23 June 2025 Friendly	CFR Cluj (Romania)	4–2	(Slovakia) Slovan Bratislava	Windischgarsten, Austria
18:00 CEST (UTC+02:00)				Stadium: Sportanlage Windischgarsten

Fri, 27 June 2025 Friendly	Polissya Zhytomyr (Ukraine)	1–1	(Slovakia) Slovan Bratislava	Bad Wimsbach-Neydharting, Austria
16:30 CEST (UTC+02:00)				Stadium: HF-Stadion Bad Wimsbach

Tue, 1 July 2025 Friendly	Slovan Bratislava (Slovakia)	4–1	(Slovakia) Dukla Banská Bystrica	Šamorín
17:00 CEST (UTC+02:00)				Stadium: x-bionic sphere

Tue, 8 July 2025 Friendly	Slovan Bratislava (Slovakia)	0–1	(Poland) Wisła Kraków	Bratislava
20:15 CEST (UTC+02:00)		Report		Stadium: Tehelné pole Attendance: 6,015

Sun, 13 July 2025 Friendly	Slovan Bratislava (Slovakia)	1–4	(Denmark) Midtjylland	Bratislava
14:00 CEST (UTC+02:00)	Pokorný 14'	Report	Cruz 8' (o.g.); Osorio 20'; Djú 57'; Etim 80'	Stadium: Tehelné pole Attendance: 5,176

=== Mid-season ===
Sat, 17 January 2026 Friendly	Slovan Bratislava (Slovakia)	4–0	(Slovakia) Zvolen
11:30 CET (UTC+01:00)

Mon, 26 January 2026 Friendly	CSKA Sofia 1948 (Bulgaria)	2–1	(Slovakia) Slovan Bratislava
14:00 CET (UTC+01:00)

Thu, 29 January 2026 Friendly	Gangwon (China)	2–2	(Slovakia) Slovan Bratislava
13:00 CET (UTC+01:00)

== Competition overview ==
Competition	First match	Last match	Starting round	Final position	Record							
Competition	First match	Last match	Starting round	Final position	Pld	W	D	L	GF	GA	GD	Win %
Slovak First Football League	26 July 2025	16 May 2026	Matchday 1	1st	32	21	5	6	62	37	+25	65.63
Slovak Cup	10 September 2025	18 February 2026	Second round	Round of 16	4	3	1	0	16	4	+12	75.00
UEFA Champions League	22 July 2025	12 August 2025	Second qualifying round	Third qualifying round	4	2	1	1	7	3	+4	50.00
UEFA Europa League	21 August 2025	28 August 2025	Play-off round	Play-off round	2	0	0	2	2	4	−2	0.00
UEFA Conference League	2 October 2025	18 December 2025	League phase	League phase	6	2	0	4	5	9	−4	33.33
Total					48	28	7	13	92	57	+35	58.33

Last updated: 16 May 2026
Source: Competitions

== Slovak First Football League ==
=== League table ===
==== Regular stage ====
Pos	Team	Pld	W	D	L	GF	GA	GD	Pts	Qualification
1	Slovan Bratislava	22	14	4	4	47	30	+17	46	Qualification for the championship group
2	DAC Dunajská Streda	22	12	7	3	39	20	+19	43	Qualification for the championship group
3	Žilina	22	11	7	4	45	27	+18	40	Qualification for the championship group
4	Spartak Trnava	22	11	4	7	35	28	+7	37	Qualification for the championship group
5	Podbrezová	22	11	3	8	46	29	+17	36	Qualification for the championship group
6	Zemplín Michalovce	22	8	5	9	32	36	−4	29	Qualification for the championship group

Source: Niké liga (in Slovak)
Rules for classification: 1) Points; 2) Head-to-head points; 3) Head-to-head goal difference; 4) Head-to-head away goals scored; 5) Play-off.

==== Championship group ====
Pos	Team	Pld	W	D	L	GF	GA	GD	Pts	Qualification	SLO	DAC	TRN	ŽIL	ZMI	POD
1	Slovan Bratislava (C)	32	21	5	6	62	37	+25	68	Qualification for the Champions League second qualifying round (Note: Slovan Bratislava was promoted to the Champions League second qualifying round as one of the two champions with the highest coefficient in Champions League first qualifying round, due to Champions League re-balancing.)	—	1–0	2–2	0–1	0–2	2–0
2	DAC Dunajská Streda	32	17	7	8	55	34	+21	58	Qualification for the Conference League second qualifying round	0–3	—	3–0	3–1	3–0	2–1
3	Spartak Trnava	32	17	5	10	51	37	+14	56	Qualification for the Conference League second qualifying round	0–1	2–1	—	1–0	3–0	4–1
4	Žilina	32	15	7	10	59	41	+18	52	Qualification for the Europa League first qualifying round (Note: Žilina qualified for the Europa League first qualifying round as the 2025–26 Slovak Cup winners.)	0–1	3–1	0–1	—	3–2	0–2
5	Zemplín Michalovce	32	13	5	14	44	52	−8	44		1–3	2–1	1–0	2–1	—	1–2
6	Podbrezová	32	13	3	16	55	51	+4	42		1–2	1–2	0–3	1–5	0–1	—

Source: Niké liga (in Slovak)
Legend: Blue = home team win; Yellow = draw; Red = away team win.
Rules for classification: 1) Points; 2) Points in regular season; 3) Head-to-head points in regular season; 4) Head-to-head goal difference in regular season; 5) Head-to-head goals scored in regular season; 6) Head-to-head away goals scored in regular season (if two teams tied); 7) Goal difference; 8) Goals scored; 9) Fair play ranking; 10) Drawing of lots.
(C) Champions

=== Results summary ===
Overall								Home						Away					
Pld	W	D	L	GF	GA	GD	Pts	W	D	L	GF	GA	GD	W	D	L	GF	GA	GD
32	21	5	6	62	37	+25	68	10	1	5	30	21	+9	11	4	1	32	16	+16

=== Results by matchday ===
Round	1	2	4	5	6	7	8	9	11	12	3	13	14	15	16	10	17	18	19	20	21	22	23	24	25	26	27	28	29	30	31	32
Ground	A	H	H	A	H	A	H	A	A	H	A	A	H	A	H	H	A	H	A	H	A	H	A	H	H	A	H	A	A	H	A	H
Result	D	W	W	D	W	D	W	W	W	L	W	W	W	W	W	L	L	W	W	L	D	W	W	L	W	W	D	W	W	W	W	L
Position	4	2	3	5	5	5	2	1	2	3	2	2	2	2	1	1	1	1	1	1	1	1	1	1	1	1	1	1	1	1	1	1
Points	1	4	7	8	11	12	15	18	21	21	24	27	30	33	36	36	36	39	42	42	43	46	49	49	52	55	56	59	62	65	68	68

A = Away; H = Home; W = Win; D = Draw; L = Loss; P = Postponed

=== Matches ===
Regular stage

Sat, 26 July 2025 1	Tatran Prešov	2–2	Slovan Bratislava	Prešov
20:30 CEST (UTC+02:00)	Regáli 33'; Wolsztyński (penalty missed) 45+4'; Olejník 52'	Report	Kukharevych 31'; Ofori 39'	Stadium: Futbal Tatran Arena; Attendance: 6,320; Referee: Peter Kráľovič

Sat, 2 August 2025 2	Slovan Bratislava	4–1	Podbrezová	Bratislava
20:30 CEST (UTC+02:00)	Strelec 10'; Barseghyan 45+1' (pen.); Ibrahim 84'; Mak 89'	Report	Marcin 33'; Galčík (penalty missed) 87'	Stadium: Tehelné pole Attendance: 6,436; Referee: Michal Očenáš

Sat, 16 August 2025 4	Slovan Bratislava	1–0	Skalica	Bratislava
18:00 CEST (UTC+02:00)	Ihnatenko 43'	Report		Stadium: Tehelné pole Attendance: 4,868; Referee: Lukáš Dzivjak

Sat, 23 August 2025 5	Zemplín Michalovce	1–1	Slovan Bratislava	Michalovce
20:30 CEST (UTC+02:00)	Musák 63'	Report	Mak 27'; Weiss (red card) (after the match)	Stadium: Mestský futbalový štadión Attendance: 4,286; Referee: Peter Ziemba

Sat, 30 August 2025 6	Slovan Bratislava	3–2	Košice	Bratislava
20:30 CEST (UTC+02:00)	Kukharevych 7', 20', 66'	Report	Čerepkai 47'; Kovács 59'	Stadium: Tehelné pole Attendance: 6,421; Referee: Erik Gemzický

Sat, 13 September 2025 7	Žilina	3–3	Slovan Bratislava	Žilina
20:30 CEST (UTC+02:00)	Ďatko 5', 29'; Káčer 33'	Report	Barseghyan 25' (pen.), 59'; Ihnatenko (red card) 87'; Kukharevych 88'	Stadium: Štadión pod Dubňom; Attendance: 5,599; Referee: Martin Dohál

Sat, 20 September 2025 8	Slovan Bratislava	3–2	DAC Dunajská Streda	Bratislava
20:30 CEST (UTC+02:00)	Barseghyan 10'; Tolić 48'; Blackman 76'		Ramadan 41', (penalty missed) 73'; Đukanović 64'	Stadium: Tehelné pole Attendance: 9,487

Sat, 27 September 2025 9	Trenčín	1–2	Slovan Bratislava	Trenčín
18:00 CEST (UTC+02:00)	Khan 90' (pen.)		Marcelli 4', 45'; Yirajang (penalty missed) 73'	Stadium: Štadión Sihoť; Attendance: 4,318

Sat, 18 October 2025 11	Spartak Trnava	0–2	Slovan Bratislava	Trnava
18:00 CEST (UTC+02:00)	Mikovič (red card) 45+4'		Cruz 60'; Marcelli 90+5'	Stadium: Štadión Antona Malatinského; Attendance: 17,011

Sun, 26 October 2025 12	Slovan Bratislava	0–1	Tatran Prešov	Bratislava
18:00 CET (UTC+01:00)	Begala 86'	Report	Pokorný (red card) 45+1'	Stadium: Tehelné pole Attendance: 6,498; Referee: Filip Glova

Wed, 29 October 2025 3	Komárno	2–3	Slovan Bratislava	Zlaté Moravce
18:00 CET (UTC+01:00)	Mashike 62'; Šmehyl 71'		Šporar 63', 90+5'; Ofori 90+2'	Stadium: ViOn Aréna; Attendance: 1,289

Sat, 1 November 2025 13	Podbrezová	1–3	Slovan Bratislava	Podbrezová
15:30 CET (UTC+01:00)	Šiler 5'		Mak 33'; Ofori 39'; Marcelli 45+2'	Stadium: ZELPO Aréna; Attendance: 3,048

Sun, 9 November 2025 14	Slovan Bratislava	3–2	Komárno	Bratislava
15:30 CET (UTC+01:00)	Marcelli 7'; Šporar 13', 45+2'		Rudzan 35'; Šimko 85'	Stadium: Tehelné pole Attendance: 4,987

Sat, 22 November 2025 15	Skalica	0–1	Slovan Bratislava	Skalica
15:30 CET (UTC+01:00)			Šporar 41'	Stadium: Štadión MFK Skalica; Attendance: 1,027

Sun, 30 November 2025 16	Slovan Bratislava	3–2	Zemplín Michalovce	Bratislava
15:30 CET (UTC+01:00)	Kashia 68'; Tolić 90+2', 90+6'		Ahl 53'; Čurma (red card) 62'; Paulauskas 85'	Stadium: Tehelné pole Attendance: 3,689

Wed, 3 December 2025 10	Slovan Bratislava	1–2	Ružomberok	Bratislava
18:00 CET (UTC+01:00)	Ihnatenko 34'		Hladík 4'; Fila 80'	Stadium: Tehelné pole Attendance: 3,119

Sat, 6 December 2025 17	Košice	2–0	Slovan Bratislava	Košice
18:00 CET (UTC+01:00)	Madleňák 43'; Rehuš 62'			Stadium: Košická futbalová aréna Attendance: 4,378

Sun, 14 December 2025 18	Slovan Bratislava	3–2	Žilina	Bratislava
18:00 CET (UTC+01:00)	Tolić 5', 45+1'; Blackman 53'		Roginić 58'; Szánthó 89'	Stadium: Tehelné pole Attendance: 5,236

Sat, 7 February 2026 19	DAC Dunajská Streda	0–3	Slovan Bratislava	Dunajská Streda
18:00 CET (UTC+01:00)	Ramadan (penalty missed) 19'; Bationo (red card) 49'		Gajdoš 12', 53'; Kukharevych 43' (pen.)	Stadium: MOL Aréna; Attendance: 9,301

Sat, 14 February 2026 20	Slovan Bratislava	0–2	Trenčín	Bratislava
15:30 CET (UTC+01:00)			Soares 5', 27'	Stadium: Tehelné pole Attendance: 4,917

Sun, 22 February 2026 21	Ružomberok	2–2	Slovan Bratislava	Ružomberok
15:30 CET (UTC+01:00)	Fila 9'; Marković 82' (o.g.)		Marković 48'; Pokorný (red card) 54'; Barseghyan 68'	Stadium: Štadión pod Čebraťom; Attendance: 1,513

Sat, 28 February 2026 22	Slovan Bratislava	4–0	Spartak Trnava	Bratislava
15:30 CET (UTC+01:00)	Šporar 6', 62' (pen.); Barseghyan 85'; Marcelli 87'			Stadium: Tehelné pole Attendance: 14,539

Championship group

Sat, 7 March 2026 23 / Championship group round 1	Zemplín Michalovce	1–3	Slovan Bratislava	Michalovce
15:30 CET (UTC+01:00)	López 66'		Barseghyan 4'; Šporar 45' (pen.), 75'	Stadium: Mestský futbalový štadión Attendance: 3,487

Sun, 15 March 2026 24 / 2	Slovan Bratislava	0–1	Žilina	Bratislava
18:00 CET (UTC+01:00)			Faško 84'	Stadium: Tehelné pole Attendance: 8,479

Sun, 22 March 2026 25 / 3	Slovan Bratislava	2–0	Podbrezová	Bratislava
18:00 CET (UTC+01:00)	Šporar 29', 64'			Stadium: Tehelné pole Attendance: 6,039

Sat, 4 April 2026 26 / 4	DAC Dunajská Streda	0–3	Slovan Bratislava	Dunajská Streda
18:00 CEST (UTC+02:00)			Marcelli 23'; Šporar 73'; Weiss Jr. 85'	Stadium: MOL Aréna; Attendance: 6,230

Sat, 11 April 2026 27 / 5	Slovan Bratislava	2–2	Spartak Trnava	Bratislava
18:00 CEST (UTC+02:00)	Marković 54'; Ibrahim 86'		Gong 28'; Khorkheli 82'	Stadium: Tehelné pole Attendance: 13,621

Sat, 18 April 2026 28 / 6	Žilina	0–1	Slovan Bratislava	Žilina
18:00 CEST (UTC+02:00)			Weiss Jr. 83'	Stadium: Štadión pod Dubňom; Attendance: 5,866

Sun, 26 April 2026 29 / 7	Spartak Trnava	0–1	Slovan Bratislava	Trnava
19:00 CEST (UTC+02:00)			Barseghyan 45+1'	Stadium: Štadión Antona Malatinského; Attendance: 10,437

Sat, 2 May 2026 30 / 8	Slovan Bratislava	1–0	DAC Dunajská Streda	Bratislava
20:30 CEST (UTC+02:00)	Barseghyan 79'		Ouro (red card) 61'	Stadium: Tehelné pole Attendance: 11,210

Sat, 9 May 2026 31 / 9	Podbrezová	1–2	Slovan Bratislava	Podbrezová
18:00 CEST (UTC+02:00)	Kováčik 52'		Barseghyan 68'; Janković 90+6' (pen.)	Stadium: ZELPO Aréna; Attendance: 1,267

Sat, 16 May 2026 32 / 10	Slovan Bratislava	0–2	Zemplín Michalovce	Bratislava
17:00 CEST (UTC+02:00)			Theofanopoulos 46'; Cottrell 62'	Stadium: Tehelné pole Attendance: 11,650

== Slovak Cup ==
Wed, 10 September 2025 Second round	Trstice (5)	2–4	Slovan Bratislava (1)	Trstice
16:30 CEST (UTC+02:00)				Stadium: TJ Družstevník Trstice; Attendance: 1,946

Sun, 5 October 2025 Third round	Piešťany (4)	0–5	Slovan Bratislava (1)	Piešťany
15:30 CEST (UTC+02:00)		Report		Stadium: PFK Piešťany; Attendance: 3,589

Sat, 15 November 2025 Fourth round	Trenčianske Stankovce (4)	1–6	Slovan Bratislava (1)	Trenčín
16:00 CET (UTC+01:00)		Report		Stadium: Štadión Sihoť; Attendance: 2,730

Wed, 18 February 2026 Round of 16	Spartak Trnava (1)	1–1 (5–3 p)	Slovan Bratislava (1)	Trnava
		Report		Stadium: Štadión Antona Malatinského; Attendance: 8,086

== UEFA Champions League ==
=== Second qualifying round ===
The draw for the second qualifying round was held on 18 June 2025.

Tue, 22 July 2025 First leg	Slovan Bratislava (Slovakia)	4–0	(Bosnia and Herzegovina) Zrinjski Mostar	Bratislava, Slovakia
20:15 CEST	Barseghyan 39'; Strelec 42'; Tolić 62'; Kukharevych 90+3'	Report		Stadium: Tehelné pole Attendance: 18,257; Referee: Jérémie Pignard (France)

Tue, 29 July 2025 Second leg	Zrinjski Mostar (Bosnia and Herzegovina)	2–2 (2–6 agg.)	(Slovakia) Slovan Bratislava	Mostar, Bosnia and Herzegovina
21:00 CEST	Bilbija 72' (pen.); Pranjić 76'	Report	Strelec 80', 87'	Stadium: Stadion pod Bijelim Brijegom; Attendance: 4,100; Referee: Arda Kardeşler (Turkey)

=== Third qualifying round ===
Wed, 6 August 2025 First leg	Kairat (Kazakhstan)	1–0	(Slovakia) Slovan Bratislava	Almaty, Kazakhstan
17:00 CEST	Satpayev 90' (pen.)	Report	Ibrahim (yellow card) 50' (yellow-red card) 65'; Weiss (yellow card) 90+2' (yellow-red card) 90+3' (off the pitch)	Stadium: Almaty Central Stadium; Attendance: 22,800; Referee: Serdar Gözübüyük (Netherlands)

Tue, 12 August 2025 Second leg	Slovan Bratislava (Slovakia)	1–0 (a.e.t.) (1–1 agg.) (3–4 p)	(Kazakhstan) Kairat	Bratislava, Slovakia
20:15 CEST	Mak 30'; Weiss Jr. (red card) (after the match)	Report		Stadium: Tehelné pole Attendance: 21,005; Referee: Benoît Bastien (France)
	Penalties
	Tolić (penalty scored); Pokorný (penalty scored); Kukharevych (penalty scored); Mustafić (penalty missed); Barseghyan (penalty missed)		(penalty missed) Gromyko; (penalty scored) Martynovich; (penalty scored) Ricardinho; (penalty scored) Sorokin; (penalty scored) Jorginho

== UEFA Europa League ==
=== Play-off round ===
Thu, 21 August 2025 First leg	Slovan Bratislava (Slovakia)	0–1	(Switzerland) Young Boys	Bratislava, Slovakia
20:15 CEST		Report	Bedia 15'	Stadium: Tehelné pole Attendance: 15,008; Referee: Sascha Stegemann (Germany)

Thu, 28 August 2025 Second leg	Young Boys (Switzerland)	3–2 (4–2 agg.)	(Slovakia) Slovan Bratislava	Bern, Switzerland
20:00 CEST	Gigović 29', 52'; Bedia 37'	Report	Mak 43'; Strelec 87'	Stadium: Stadion Wankdorf; Attendance: 13,806; Referee: Rade Obrenovič (Slovenia)

== UEFA Conference League ==
=== League phase ===
Pos	Team	Pld	W	D	L	GF	GA	GD	Pts
27	(Ukrainian Association of Football) Dynamo Kyiv	6	2	0	4	9	9	0	6
28	(Polish Football Association) Legia Warsaw	6	2	0	4	8	8	0	6
29	(Slovak Football Association) Slovan Bratislava	6	2	0	4	5	9	−4	6
30	(Football Association of Iceland) Breiðablik	6	1	2	3	6	11	−5	5
31	(Football Association of Ireland) Shamrock Rovers	6	1	1	4	7	13	−6	4

Source: UEFA
Rules for classification: League phase tiebreakers

Round	1	2	3	4	5	6
Ground	H	A	A	H	A	H
Result	L	L	L	W	L	W
Position	22	31	34	29	31	29
Points	0	0	0	3	3	6

A = Away; H = Home; W = Win; D = Draw; L = Loss

==== Matches ====
Thu, 2 October 2025 1	Slovan Bratislava (Slovakia)	1–2	(France) Strasbourg	Bratislava, Slovakia
21:00 CEST	Ibrahim 64'	Report	Yirajang 26' (o.g.); Ouattara 41'	Stadium: Tehelné pole Attendance: 15,204; Referee: Andrea Colombo (Italy)

Thu, 23 October 2025 2	AZ (Netherlands)	1–0	(Slovakia) Slovan Bratislava	Alkmaar, Netherlands
18:45 CEST	Mijnans 44', (penalty missed) 45+5'	Report	Cruz (red card) 87'	Stadium: AFAS Stadion; Attendance: 12,086; Referee: Tobias Stieler (Germany)

Thu, 6 November 2025 3	KuPS (Finland)	3–1	(Slovakia) Slovan Bratislava	Tampere, Finland
18:45 CET	Antwi 41'; Parzyszek 48'; Oksanen 81'	Report	Marcelli 3'	Stadium: Tammelan Stadion; Attendance: 2,875; Referee: Christos Vergetis (Greece)

Thu, 27 November 2025 4	Slovan Bratislava (Slovakia)	2–1	(Spain) Rayo Vallecano	Bratislava, Slovakia
18:45 CET	Kashia 49'; Yirajang 52'	Report	Pérez 24'	Stadium: Tehelné pole Attendance: 16,502; Referee: Lawrence Visser (Belgium)

Thu, 11 December 2025 5	Shkëndija (North Macedonia)	2–0	(Slovakia) Slovan Bratislava	Skopje, North Macedonia
18:45 CET	Bajrić 33' (o.g.); Spahiu 45+1'	Report		Stadium: Toše Proeski Arena; Attendance: 1,497; Referee: Ívar Orri Kristjánsson (Iceland)

Thu, 18 December 2025 6	Slovan Bratislava (Slovakia)	1–0	(Sweden) BK Häcken	Bratislava, Slovakia
21:00 CET	Blackman 85'	Report		Stadium: Tehelné pole Attendance: 7,879; Referee: Florian Lata (Albania)

== Statistics ==
=== Attendances ===
As of 16 May 2026

	Matches	Attendances	Average	High	Low
Slovak First Football League	16	121,196	7,575	14,539	3,119
Slovak Cup	0				
Champions League	2	39,262	19,631	21,005	18,257
Europa League	1	15,008	15,008	15,008	15,008
Conference League	3	39,585	13,195	16,502	7,879
Total	22	215,051	9,775	21,005	3,119
