= 2025–26 UEFA Conference League league phase =

International football club competition in Europe

The 2025–26 UEFA Conference League league phase began on 2 October and ended on 18 December 2025. A total of 36 teams competed in the league phase to decide the 24 places in the knockout phase of the 2025–26 UEFA Conference League.

Crystal Palace, Drita, Hamrun Spartans, KuPS, Rayo Vallecano, Samsunspor, Shelbourne, Shkëndija, Sigma Olomouc and Universitatea Craiova made their debut appearances in a major UEFA competition group or league phase. Hamrun Spartans was the first team from Malta to play in a major UEFA competition group stage or league phase.

A total of 29 national associations were represented in the league phase. Poland was the first country to have four clubs play in the Conference League group stage/league phase, and it was also the first time in history that four Polish clubs competed in any edition of a UEFA competition group stage or league phase.

== Format ==
Each team played six matches, three at home and three away, against six different opponents, with all 36 teams ranked in a single league table. Teams were separated into six pots based on their 2025 UEFA club coefficients, and each team played one team from each of the six pots. The top eight teams in the standings received a bye to the round of 16. The teams ranked from 9th to 24th contested the knockout phase play-offs, with the teams ranked from 9th to 16th seeded for the draw. Teams ranked from 25th to 36th were eliminated from European competition.

=== Tiebreakers ===
Teams were ranked according to points (3 points for a win, 1 point for a draw, 0 points for a loss). If two or more teams were equal on points upon completion of the league phase, the following tiebreaking criteria were applied, in the order given, to determine their rankings:

While the league phase was in progress, teams were ranked according to criteria 1–5 only, and if still tied, were given equal ranking and sorted alphabetically. Criteria 6–10 were only used after the final matches took place.

1. Goal difference;
2. Goals scored;
3. Away goals scored;
4. Wins;
5. Away wins;
6. Higher number of points obtained collectively by league phase opponents;
7. Superior collective goal difference of league phase opponents;
8. Higher number of goals scored collectively by league phase opponents;
9. Lower disciplinary points total (direct red card or expulsion for two yellow cards in one match = 3 points, yellow card = 1 point);
10. UEFA club coefficient.

== Teams and seeding ==
The 36 teams were divided into six pots of six teams each, with teams allocated to pots based on their 2025 UEFA club coefficients. The participants included:

- 24 winners of the play-off round (5 from the Champions Path, 19 from the Main Path)
- 12 losers of the Europa League play-off round

Key to colours
Teams ranked 1 to 8 advanced to the round of 16 as a seeded team
Teams ranked 9 to 16 advanced to the knockout phase play-offs as a seeded team
Teams ranked 17 to 24 advanced to the knockout phase play-offs as an unseeded team

Pot 1
Team	Notes	Coeff.
(Italian Football Federation) Fiorentina		62.000
(Royal Dutch Football Association) AZ		54.500
(Ukrainian Association of Football) Shakhtar Donetsk		52.000
(Slovak Football Association) Slovan Bratislava		33.500
(Austrian Football Association) Rapid Wien		32.250
(Polish Football Association) Legia Warsaw		31.000

Pot 4
Team	Notes	Coeff.
(Football Association of Bosnia and Herzegovina) Zrinjski Mostar		10.000
(Gibraltar Football Association) Lincoln Red Imps		10.000
(Football Association of Finland) KuPS		10.000
(Hellenic Football Federation) AEK Athens		9.500
(Scottish Football Association) Aberdeen		9.500
(Football Federation of Kosovo) Drita		9.000

Pot 2
Team	Notes	Coeff.
(Football Association of the Czech Republic) Sparta Prague		29.500
(Ukrainian Association of Football) Dynamo Kyiv		23.500
(The Football Association) Crystal Palace		23.039
(Polish Football Association) Lech Poznań		19.000
(Royal Spanish Football Federation) Rayo Vallecano		18.890
(Football Association of Ireland) Shamrock Rovers		17.875

Pot 5
Team	Notes	Coeff.
(Football Association of Iceland) Breiðablik		9.000
(Football Association of the Czech Republic) Sigma Olomouc		8.820
(Turkish Football Federation) Samsunspor		8.780
(Polish Football Association) Raków Częstochowa		8.000
(Cyprus Football Association) AEK Larnaca		7.500
(Football Federation of Macedonia) Shkëndija		7.500

Pot 3
Team	Notes	Coeff.
(Cyprus Football Association) Omonia		17.375
(German Football Association) Mainz 05		17.266
(French Football Federation) Strasbourg		14.618
(Polish Football Association) Jagiellonia Białystok		14.000
(Football Association of Slovenia) Celje		14.000
(Croatian Football Federation) Rijeka		12.000

Pot 6
Team	Notes	Coeff.
(Swedish Football Association) BK Häcken		7.000
(Swiss Football Association) Lausanne-Sport		6.725
(Romanian Football Federation) Universitatea Craiova		6.500
(Malta Football Association) Hamrun Spartans		6.000
(Football Federation of Armenia) Noah		5.000
(Football Association of Ireland) Shelbourne		2.993

Notes

1. ^{ECL-CH} Winners of play-off round (Champions Path)
2. ^{ECL-MP} Winners of play-off round (Main Path)
3. ^{EL-PO} Losers of Europa League play-off round

== Draw ==
The draw for the league phase pairings was held at the Grimaldi Forum in Monaco on 29 August 2025, 13:00 CEST, along with the draw for the Europa League league phase. The automated draw software instantly conducted the full digital draw at random, determining the home and away matches for all clubs. Each team faced one opponent from each of the six pots, three of which they faced at home and three away. For the purposes of determining match venues, adjacent pots were paired (Pot 1 with 2, 3 with 4, and 5 with 6) so that, for each pot pairing, teams would face one opponent at home and one away. Teams could not face opponents from their own association, and could only be drawn against a maximum of two sides from the same association. For political reasons, clubs from Gibraltar–Spain and Kosovo–Bosnia and Herzegovina could not be drawn against each other. The draw results were then revealed pot-by-pot, starting with Pot 1, with the intention of "maintaining suspense and clarity for viewers". This was a change of format from the previous season, where teams were individually drawn before their opponents were digitally determined.

The venue for each club's fixtures is shown in brackets below (H: home; A: away).

League phase opponents by club
Club	Pot 1 opponent		Pot 2 opponent		Pot 3 opponent		Pot 4 opponent		Pot 5 opponent		Pot 6 opponent		Avg coeff.
(Italian Football Federation) Fiorentina	Rapid Wien	(A)	Dynamo Kyiv	(H)	Mainz 05	(A)	AEK Athens	(H)	Sigma Olomouc	(H)	Lausanne-Sport	(A)	16.3
(Royal Dutch Football Association) AZ	Slovan Bratislava	(H)	Crystal Palace	(A)	Jagiellonia Białystok	(H)	Drita	(A)	AEK Larnaca	(A)	Shelbourne	(H)	15.0
(Ukrainian Association of Football) Shakhtar Donetsk	Legia Warsaw	(H)	Shamrock Rovers	(A)	Rijeka	(H)	Aberdeen	(A)	Breiðablik	(H)	Hamrun Spartans	(A)	14.2
(Slovak Football Association) Slovan Bratislava	AZ	(A)	Rayo Vallecano	(H)	Strasbourg	(H)	KuPS	(A)	Shkëndija	(A)	BK Häcken	(H)	18.8
(Austrian Football Association) Rapid Wien	Fiorentina	(H)	Lech Poznań	(A)	Omonia	(H)	Zrinjski Mostar	(A)	Raków Częstochowa	(A)	Universitatea Craiova	(H)	20.5
(Polish Football Association) Legia Warsaw	Shakhtar Donetsk	(A)	Sparta Prague	(H)	Celje	(A)	Lincoln Red Imps	(H)	Samsunspor	(H)	Noah	(A)	19.9
(Football Association of the Czech Republic) Sparta Prague	Legia Warsaw	(A)	Shamrock Rovers	(H)	Rijeka	(A)	Aberdeen	(H)	Raków Częstochowa	(H)	Universitatea Craiova	(A)	14.1
(Ukrainian Association of Football) Dynamo Kyiv	Fiorentina	(A)	Crystal Palace	(H)	Omonia	(A)	Zrinjski Mostar	(H)	Samsunspor	(A)	Noah	(H)	21.0
(The Football Association) Crystal Palace	AZ	(H)	Dynamo Kyiv	(A)	Strasbourg	(A)	KuPS	(H)	AEK Larnaca	(H)	Shelbourne	(A)	18.9
(Polish Football Association) Lech Poznań	Rapid Wien	(H)	Rayo Vallecano	(A)	Mainz 05	(H)	Lincoln Red Imps	(A)	Sigma Olomouc	(A)	Lausanne-Sport	(H)	15.7
(Royal Spanish Football Federation) Rayo Vallecano	Slovan Bratislava	(A)	Lech Poznań	(H)	Jagiellonia Białystok	(A)	Drita	(H)	Shkëndija	(H)	BK Häcken	(A)	15.0
(Football Association of Ireland) Shamrock Rovers	Shakhtar Donetsk	(H)	Sparta Prague	(A)	Celje	(H)	AEK Athens	(A)	Breiðablik	(A)	Hamrun Spartans	(H)	20.0
(Cyprus Football Association) Omonia	Rapid Wien	(A)	Dynamo Kyiv	(H)	Mainz 05	(H)	Drita	(A)	Raków Częstochowa	(H)	Lausanne-Sport	(A)	16.1
(German Football Association) Mainz 05	Fiorentina	(H)	Lech Poznań	(A)	Omonia	(A)	Zrinjski Mostar	(H)	Samsunspor	(H)	Universitatea Craiova	(A)	20.6
(French Football Federation) Strasbourg	Slovan Bratislava	(A)	Crystal Palace	(H)	Jagiellonia Białystok	(H)	Aberdeen	(A)	Breiðablik	(H)	BK Häcken	(A)	16.0
(Polish Football Association) Jagiellonia Białystok	AZ	(A)	Rayo Vallecano	(H)	Strasbourg	(A)	KuPS	(H)	Shkëndija	(A)	Hamrun Spartans	(H)	18.6
(Football Association of Slovenia) Celje	Legia Warsaw	(H)	Shamrock Rovers	(A)	Rijeka	(A)	AEK Athens	(H)	Sigma Olomouc	(A)	Shelbourne	(H)	13.7
(Croatian Football Federation) Rijeka	Shakhtar Donetsk	(A)	Sparta Prague	(H)	Celje	(H)	Lincoln Red Imps	(A)	AEK Larnaca	(H)	Noah	(A)	19.7
(Football Association of Bosnia and Herzegovina) Zrinjski Mostar	Rapid Wien	(H)	Dynamo Kyiv	(A)	Mainz 05	(A)	Lincoln Red Imps	(H)	Raków Częstochowa	(A)	BK Häcken	(H)	16.3
(Gibraltar Football Association) Lincoln Red Imps	Legia Warsaw	(A)	Lech Poznań	(H)	Rijeka	(H)	Zrinjski Mostar	(A)	Sigma Olomouc	(H)	Hamrun Spartans	(A)	14.5
(Football Association of Finland) KuPS	Slovan Bratislava	(H)	Crystal Palace	(A)	Jagiellonia Białystok	(A)	Drita	(H)	Breiðablik	(A)	Lausanne-Sport	(H)	15.9
(Hellenic Football Federation) AEK Athens	Fiorentina	(A)	Shamrock Rovers	(H)	Celje	(A)	Aberdeen	(H)	Samsunspor	(A)	Universitatea Craiova	(H)	19.8
(Scottish Football Association) Aberdeen	Shakhtar Donetsk	(H)	Sparta Prague	(A)	Strasbourg	(H)	AEK Athens	(A)	AEK Larnaca	(A)	Noah	(H)	19.7
(Football Federation of Kosovo) Drita	AZ	(H)	Rayo Vallecano	(A)	Omonia	(H)	KuPS	(A)	Shkëndija	(H)	Shelbourne	(A)	18.5
(Football Association of Iceland) Breiðablik	Shakhtar Donetsk	(A)	Shamrock Rovers	(H)	Strasbourg	(A)	KuPS	(H)	Samsunspor	(H)	Lausanne-Sport	(A)	18.3
(Football Association of the Czech Republic) Sigma Olomouc	Fiorentina	(A)	Lech Poznań	(H)	Celje	(H)	Lincoln Red Imps	(A)	Raków Częstochowa	(H)	Noah	(A)	19.7
(Turkish Football Federation) Samsunspor	Legia Warsaw	(A)	Dynamo Kyiv	(H)	Mainz 05	(A)	AEK Athens	(H)	Breiðablik	(A)	Hamrun Spartans	(H)	16.0
(Polish Football Association) Raków Częstochowa	Rapid Wien	(H)	Sparta Prague	(A)	Omonia	(A)	Zrinjski Mostar	(H)	Sigma Olomouc	(A)	Universitatea Craiova	(H)	17.4
(Cyprus Football Association) AEK Larnaca	AZ	(H)	Crystal Palace	(A)	Rijeka	(A)	Aberdeen	(H)	Shkëndija	(H)	BK Häcken	(A)	18.9
(Football Federation of Macedonia) Shkëndija	Slovan Bratislava	(H)	Rayo Vallecano	(A)	Jagiellonia Białystok	(H)	Drita	(A)	AEK Larnaca	(A)	Shelbourne	(H)	14.3
(Swedish Football Association) BK Häcken	Slovan Bratislava	(A)	Rayo Vallecano	(H)	Strasbourg	(H)	Zrinjski Mostar	(A)	AEK Larnaca	(H)	Shelbourne	(A)	14.6
(Swiss Football Association) Lausanne-Sport	Fiorentina	(H)	Lech Poznań	(A)	Omonia	(H)	KuPS	(A)	Breiðablik	(H)	Hamrun Spartans	(A)	20.6
(Romanian Football Federation) Universitatea Craiova	Rapid Wien	(A)	Sparta Prague	(H)	Mainz 05	(H)	AEK Athens	(A)	Raków Częstochowa	(A)	Noah	(H)	16.9
(Malta Football Association) Hamrun Spartans	Shakhtar Donetsk	(H)	Shamrock Rovers	(A)	Jagiellonia Białystok	(A)	Lincoln Red Imps	(H)	Samsunspor	(A)	Lausanne-Sport	(H)	18.2
(Football Federation of Armenia) Noah	Legia Warsaw	(H)	Dynamo Kyiv	(A)	Rijeka	(H)	Aberdeen	(A)	Sigma Olomouc	(H)	Universitatea Craiova	(A)	15.2
(Football Association of Ireland) Shelbourne	AZ	(A)	Crystal Palace	(H)	Celje	(A)	Drita	(H)	Shkëndija	(A)	BK Häcken	(H)	19.2

== League phase table ==
Pos	Team	Pld	W	D	L	GF	GA	GD	Pts	Qualification
1	(French Football Federation) Strasbourg	6	5	1	0	11	5	+6	16	Advance to round of 16 (seeded)
2	(Polish Football Association) Raków Częstochowa	6	4	2	0	9	2	+7	14	Advance to round of 16 (seeded)
3	(Hellenic Football Federation) AEK Athens	6	4	1	1	14	7	+7	13	Advance to round of 16 (seeded)
4	(Football Association of the Czech Republic) Sparta Prague	6	4	1	1	10	3	+7	13	Advance to round of 16 (seeded)
5	(Royal Spanish Football Federation) Rayo Vallecano	6	4	1	1	13	7	+6	13	Advance to round of 16 (seeded)
6	(Ukrainian Association of Football) Shakhtar Donetsk	6	4	1	1	10	5	+5	13	Advance to round of 16 (seeded)
7	(German Football Association) Mainz 05	6	4	1	1	7	3	+4	13	Advance to round of 16 (seeded)
8	(Cyprus Football Association) AEK Larnaca	6	3	3	0	7	1	+6	12	Advance to round of 16 (seeded)
9	(Swiss Football Association) Lausanne-Sport	6	3	2	1	6	3	+3	11	Advance to knockout phase play-offs (seeded)
10	(The Football Association) Crystal Palace	6	3	1	2	11	6	+5	10	Advance to knockout phase play-offs (seeded)
11	(Polish Football Association) Lech Poznań	6	3	1	2	12	8	+4	10	Advance to knockout phase play-offs (seeded)
12	(Turkish Football Federation) Samsunspor	6	3	1	2	10	6	+4	10	Advance to knockout phase play-offs (seeded)
13	(Football Association of Slovenia) Celje	6	3	1	2	8	7	+1	10	Advance to knockout phase play-offs (seeded)
14	(Royal Dutch Football Association) AZ	6	3	1	2	7	7	0	10	Advance to knockout phase play-offs (seeded)
15	(Italian Football Federation) Fiorentina	6	3	0	3	8	5	+3	9	Advance to knockout phase play-offs (seeded)
16	(Croatian Football Federation) Rijeka	6	2	3	1	5	2	+3	9	Advance to knockout phase play-offs (seeded)
17	(Polish Football Association) Jagiellonia Białystok	6	2	3	1	5	4	+1	9	Advance to knockout phase play-offs (unseeded)
18	(Cyprus Football Association) Omonia	6	2	2	2	5	4	+1	8	Advance to knockout phase play-offs (unseeded)
19	(Football Federation of Armenia) Noah	6	2	2	2	6	7	−1	8	Advance to knockout phase play-offs (unseeded)
20	(Football Federation of Kosovo) Drita	6	2	2	2	4	8	−4	8	Advance to knockout phase play-offs (unseeded)
21	(Football Association of Finland) KuPS	6	1	4	1	6	5	+1	7	Advance to knockout phase play-offs (unseeded)
22	(Football Federation of Macedonia) Shkëndija	6	2	1	3	4	5	−1	7	Advance to knockout phase play-offs (unseeded)
23	(Football Association of Bosnia and Herzegovina) Zrinjski Mostar	6	2	1	3	8	10	−2	7	Advance to knockout phase play-offs (unseeded)
24	(Football Association of the Czech Republic) Sigma Olomouc	6	2	1	3	7	9	−2	7	Advance to knockout phase play-offs (unseeded)
25	(Romanian Football Federation) Universitatea Craiova	6	2	1	3	6	8	−2	7	
26	(Gibraltar Football Association) Lincoln Red Imps	6	2	1	3	7	15	−8	7	
27	(Ukrainian Association of Football) Dynamo Kyiv	6	2	0	4	9	9	0	6	
28	(Polish Football Association) Legia Warsaw	6	2	0	4	8	8	0	6	
29	(Slovak Football Association) Slovan Bratislava	6	2	0	4	5	9	−4	6	
30	(Football Association of Iceland) Breiðablik	6	1	2	3	6	11	−5	5	
31	(Football Association of Ireland) Shamrock Rovers	6	1	1	4	7	13	−6	4	
32	(Swedish Football Association) BK Häcken	6	0	3	3	5	8	−3	3	
33	(Malta Football Association) Hamrun Spartans	6	1	0	5	4	11	−7	3	
34	(Football Association of Ireland) Shelbourne	6	0	2	4	0	7	−7	2	
35	(Scottish Football Association) Aberdeen	6	0	2	4	3	14	−11	2	
36	(Austrian Football Association) Rapid Wien	6	0	1	5	3	14	−11	1	

Source: UEFA
Rules for classification: League phase tiebreakers

== Results summary ==
=== By matchday ===
Matchday 1
Home team	Score	Away team
Dynamo Kyiv (Ukraine)	0–2	(England) Crystal Palace
Lausanne-Sport (Switzerland)	3–0	(Iceland) Breiðablik
Noah (Armenia)	1–0	(Croatia) Rijeka
Zrinjski Mostar (Bosnia and Herzegovina)	5–0	(Gibraltar) Lincoln Red Imps
Jagiellonia Białystok (Poland)	1–0	(Malta) Hamrun Spartans
Lech Poznań (Poland)	4–1	(Austria) Rapid Wien
KuPS (Finland)	1–1	(Kosovo) Drita
Omonia (Cyprus)	0–1	(Germany) Mainz 05
Rayo Vallecano (Spain)	2–0	(North Macedonia) Shkëndija
Aberdeen (Scotland)	2–3	(Ukraine) Shakhtar Donetsk
Sparta Prague (Czech Republic)	4–1	(Republic of Ireland) Shamrock Rovers
Fiorentina (Italy)	2–0	(Czech Republic) Sigma Olomouc
AEK Larnaca (Cyprus)	4–0	(Netherlands) AZ
Legia Warsaw (Poland)	0–1	(Turkey) Samsunspor
Celje (Slovenia)	3–1	(Greece) AEK Athens
Raków Częstochowa (Poland)	2–0	(Romania) Universitatea Craiova
Shelbourne (Republic of Ireland)	0–0	(Sweden) BK Häcken
Slovan Bratislava (Slovakia)	1–2	(France) Strasbourg

Matchday 2
Home team	Score	Away team
AEK Athens (Greece)	6–0	(Scotland) Aberdeen
BK Häcken (Sweden)	2–2	(Spain) Rayo Vallecano
Breiðablik (Iceland)	0–0	(Finland) KuPS
Shakhtar Donetsk (Ukraine)	1–2	(Poland) Legia Warsaw
Drita (Kosovo)	1–1	(Cyprus) Omonia
Rijeka (Croatia)	1–0	(Czech Republic) Sparta Prague
Shkëndija (North Macedonia)	1–0	(Republic of Ireland) Shelbourne
Strasbourg (France)	1–1	(Poland) Jagiellonia Białystok
Rapid Wien (Austria)	0–3	(Italy) Fiorentina
AZ (Netherlands)	1–0	(Slovakia) Slovan Bratislava
Mainz 05 (Germany)	1–0	(Bosnia and Herzegovina) Zrinjski Mostar
Crystal Palace (England)	0–1	(Cyprus) AEK Larnaca
Hamrun Spartans (Malta)	0–1	(Switzerland) Lausanne-Sport
Lincoln Red Imps (Gibraltar)	2–1	(Poland) Lech Poznań
Samsunspor (Turkey)	3–0	(Ukraine) Dynamo Kyiv
Shamrock Rovers (Republic of Ireland)	0–2	(Slovenia) Celje
Sigma Olomouc (Czech Republic)	1–1	(Poland) Raków Częstochowa
Universitatea Craiova (Romania)	1–1	(Armenia) Noah

Matchday 3
Home team	Score	Away team
Mainz 05 (Germany)	2–1	(Italy) Fiorentina
Sparta Prague (Czech Republic)	0–0	(Poland) Raków Częstochowa
AEK Athens (Greece)	1–1	(Republic of Ireland) Shamrock Rovers
AEK Larnaca (Cyprus)	0–0	(Scotland) Aberdeen
Shakhtar Donetsk (Ukraine)	2–0	(Iceland) Breiðablik
Noah (Armenia)	1–2	(Czech Republic) Sigma Olomouc
KuPS (Finland)	3–1	(Slovakia) Slovan Bratislava
Celje (Slovenia)	2–1	(Poland) Legia Warsaw
Samsunspor (Turkey)	3–0	(Malta) Hamrun Spartans
BK Häcken (Sweden)	1–2	(France) Strasbourg
Crystal Palace (England)	3–1	(Netherlands) AZ
Lausanne-Sport (Switzerland)	1–1	(Cyprus) Omonia
Dynamo Kyiv (Ukraine)	6–0	(Bosnia and Herzegovina) Zrinjski Mostar
Shkëndija (North Macedonia)	1–1	(Poland) Jagiellonia Białystok
Lincoln Red Imps (Gibraltar)	1–1	(Croatia) Rijeka
Rayo Vallecano (Spain)	3–2	(Poland) Lech Poznań
Shelbourne (Republic of Ireland)	0–1	(Kosovo) Drita
Rapid Wien (Austria)	0–1	(Romania) Universitatea Craiova

Matchday 4
Home team	Score	Away team
AZ (Netherlands)	2–0	(Republic of Ireland) Shelbourne
Hamrun Spartans (Malta)	3–1	(Gibraltar) Lincoln Red Imps
Zrinjski Mostar (Bosnia and Herzegovina)	2–1	(Sweden) BK Häcken
Lech Poznań (Poland)	2–0	(Switzerland) Lausanne-Sport
Omonia (Cyprus)	2–0	(Ukraine) Dynamo Kyiv
Raków Częstochowa (Poland)	4–1	(Austria) Rapid Wien
Sigma Olomouc (Czech Republic)	2–1	(Slovenia) Celje
Universitatea Craiova (Romania)	1–0	(Germany) Mainz 05
Slovan Bratislava (Slovakia)	2–1	(Spain) Rayo Vallecano
Aberdeen (Scotland)	1–1	(Armenia) Noah
Fiorentina (Italy)	0–1	(Greece) AEK Athens
Breiðablik (Iceland)	2–2	(Turkey) Samsunspor
Drita (Kosovo)	1–0	(North Macedonia) Shkëndija
Rijeka (Croatia)	0–0	(Cyprus) AEK Larnaca
Jagiellonia Białystok (Poland)	1–0	(Finland) KuPS
Legia Warsaw (Poland)	0–1	(Czech Republic) Sparta Prague
Strasbourg (France)	2–1	(England) Crystal Palace
Shamrock Rovers (Republic of Ireland)	1–2	(Ukraine) Shakhtar Donetsk

Matchday 5
Home team	Score	Away team
Fiorentina (Italy)	2–1	(Ukraine) Dynamo Kyiv
BK Häcken (Sweden)	1–1	(Cyprus) AEK Larnaca
Breiðablik (Iceland)	3–1	(Republic of Ireland) Shamrock Rovers
Drita (Kosovo)	0–3	(Netherlands) AZ
Noah (Armenia)	2–1	(Poland) Legia Warsaw
Jagiellonia Białystok (Poland)	1–2	(Spain) Rayo Vallecano
Shkëndija (North Macedonia)	2–0	(Slovakia) Slovan Bratislava
Samsunspor (Turkey)	1–2	(Greece) AEK Athens
Universitatea Craiova (Romania)	1–2	(Czech Republic) Sparta Prague
Aberdeen (Scotland)	0–1	(France) Strasbourg
Hamrun Spartans (Malta)	0–2	(Ukraine) Shakhtar Donetsk
Rijeka (Croatia)	3–0	(Slovenia) Celje
Lech Poznań (Poland)	1–1	(Germany) Mainz 05
KuPS (Finland)	0–0	(Switzerland) Lausanne-Sport
Lincoln Red Imps (Gibraltar)	2–1	(Czech Republic) Sigma Olomouc
Raków Częstochowa (Poland)	1–0	(Bosnia and Herzegovina) Zrinjski Mostar
Shelbourne (Republic of Ireland)	0–3	(England) Crystal Palace
Rapid Wien (Austria)	0–1	(Cyprus) Omonia

Matchday 6
Home team	Score	Away team
Mainz 05 (Germany)	2–0	(Turkey) Samsunspor
Sparta Prague (Czech Republic)	3–0	(Scotland) Aberdeen
AEK Athens (Greece)	3–2	(Romania) Universitatea Craiova
AEK Larnaca (Cyprus)	1–0	(North Macedonia) Shkëndija
AZ (Netherlands)	0–0	(Poland) Jagiellonia Białystok
Crystal Palace (England)	2–2	(Finland) KuPS
Shakhtar Donetsk (Ukraine)	0–0	(Croatia) Rijeka
Dynamo Kyiv (Ukraine)	2–0	(Armenia) Noah
Lausanne-Sport (Switzerland)	1–0	(Italy) Fiorentina
Zrinjski Mostar (Bosnia and Herzegovina)	1–1	(Austria) Rapid Wien
Legia Warsaw (Poland)	4–1	(Gibraltar) Lincoln Red Imps
Celje (Slovenia)	0–0	(Republic of Ireland) Shelbourne
Omonia (Cyprus)	0–1	(Poland) Raków Częstochowa
Strasbourg (France)	3–1	(Iceland) Breiðablik
Rayo Vallecano (Spain)	3–0	(Kosovo) Drita
Shamrock Rovers (Republic of Ireland)	3–1	(Malta) Hamrun Spartans
Sigma Olomouc (Czech Republic)	1–2	(Poland) Lech Poznań
Slovan Bratislava (Slovakia)	1–0	(Sweden) BK Häcken

=== By team ===
Results by Pot 1 team
Team	Matchday					
Team	1	2	3	4	5	6
(Italy) Fiorentina	SIG (H)	RWI (A)	MNZ (A)	AEK (H)	DKV (H)	LAU (A)
(Italy) Fiorentina	2–0	3–0	1–2	0–1	2–1	0–1
(Netherlands) AZ	LAR (A)	SLO (H)	CRY (A)	SHL (H)	DRI (A)	JAG (H)
(Netherlands) AZ	0–4	1–0	1–3	2–0	3–0	0–0
(Ukraine) Shakhtar Donetsk	ABE (A)	LEG (H)	BRD (H)	SHR (A)	HAM (A)	RJK (H)
(Ukraine) Shakhtar Donetsk	3–2	1–2	2–0	2–1	2–0	0–0
(Slovakia) Slovan Bratislava	STR (H)	AZ (A)	KUP (A)	RAY (H)	SKN (A)	HAC (H)
(Slovakia) Slovan Bratislava	1–2	0–1	1–3	2–1	0–2	1–0
(Austria) Rapid Wien	LCH (A)	FIO (H)	UCR (H)	RAK (A)	OMO (H)	ZRI (A)
(Austria) Rapid Wien	1–4	0–3	0–1	1–4	0–1	1–1
(Poland) Legia Warsaw	SAM (H)	SHK (A)	CLJ (A)	SPP (H)	NOA (A)	LRI (H)
(Poland) Legia Warsaw	0–1	2–1	1–2	0–1	1–2	4–1

Results by Pot 2 team
Team	Matchday					
Team	1	2	3	4	5	6
(Czech Republic) Sparta Prague	SHR (H)	RJK (A)	RAK (H)	LEG (A)	UCR (A)	ABE (H)
(Czech Republic) Sparta Prague	4–1	0–1	0–0	1–0	2–1	3–0
(Ukraine) Dynamo Kyiv	CRY (H)	SAM (A)	ZRI (H)	OMO (A)	FIO (A)	NOA (H)
(Ukraine) Dynamo Kyiv	0–2	0–3	6–0	0–2	1–2	2–0
(England) Crystal Palace	DKV (A)	LAR (H)	AZ (H)	STR (A)	SHL (A)	KUP (H)
(England) Crystal Palace	2–0	0–1	3–1	1–2	3–0	2–2
(Poland) Lech Poznań	RWI (H)	LRI (A)	RAY (A)	LAU (H)	MNZ (H)	SIG (A)
(Poland) Lech Poznań	4–1	1–2	2–3	2–0	1–1	2–1
(Spain) Rayo Vallecano	SKN (H)	HAC (A)	LCH (H)	SLO (A)	JAG (A)	DRI (H)
(Spain) Rayo Vallecano	2–0	2–2	3–2	1–2	2–1	3–0
(Republic of Ireland) Shamrock Rovers	SPP (A)	CLJ (H)	AEK (A)	SHK (H)	BRD (A)	HAM (H)
(Republic of Ireland) Shamrock Rovers	1–4	0–2	1–1	1–2	1–3	3–1

Results by Pot 3 team
Team	Matchday					
Team	1	2	3	4	5	6
(Cyprus) Omonia	MNZ (H)	DRI (A)	LAU (A)	DKV (H)	RWI (A)	RAK (H)
(Cyprus) Omonia	0–1	1–1	1–1	2–0	1–0	0–1
(Germany) Mainz 05	OMO (A)	ZRI (H)	FIO (H)	UCR (A)	LCH (A)	SAM (H)
(Germany) Mainz 05	1–0	1–0	2–1	0–1	1–1	2–0
(France) Strasbourg	SLO (A)	JAG (H)	HAC (A)	CRY (H)	ABE (A)	BRD (H)
(France) Strasbourg	2–1	1–1	2–1	2–1	1–0	3–1
(Slovenia) Celje	AEK (H)	SHR (A)	LEG (H)	SIG (A)	RJK (A)	SHL (H)
(Slovenia) Celje	3–1	2–0	2–1	1–2	0–3	0–0
(Poland) Jagiellonia Białystok	HAM (H)	STR (A)	SKN (A)	KUP (H)	RAY (H)	AZ (A)
(Poland) Jagiellonia Białystok	1–0	1–1	1–1	1–0	1–2	0–0
(Croatia) Rijeka	NOA (A)	SPP (H)	LRI (A)	LAR (H)	CLJ (H)	SHK (A)
(Croatia) Rijeka	0–1	1–0	1–1	0–0	3–0	0–0

Results by Pot 4 team
Team	Matchday					
Team	1	2	3	4	5	6
(Finland) KuPS	DRI (H)	BRD (A)	SLO (H)	JAG (A)	LAU (H)	CRY (A)
(Finland) KuPS	1–1	0–0	3–1	0–1	0–0	2–2
(Gibraltar) Lincoln Red Imps	ZRI (A)	LCH (H)	RJK (H)	HAM (A)	SIG (H)	LEG (A)
(Gibraltar) Lincoln Red Imps	0–5	2–1	1–1	1–3	2–1	1–4
(Bosnia and Herzegovina) Zrinjski Mostar	LRI (H)	MNZ (A)	DKV (A)	HAC (H)	RAK (A)	RWI (H)
(Bosnia and Herzegovina) Zrinjski Mostar	5–0	0–1	0–6	2–1	0–1	1–1
(Scotland) Aberdeen	SHK (H)	AEK (A)	LAR (A)	NOA (H)	STR (H)	SPP (A)
(Scotland) Aberdeen	2–3	0–6	0–0	1–1	0–1	0–3
(Greece) AEK Athens	CLJ (A)	ABE (H)	SHR (H)	FIO (A)	SAM (A)	UCR (H)
(Greece) AEK Athens	1–3	6–0	1–1	1–0	2–1	3–2
(Iceland) Breiðablik	LAU (A)	KUP (H)	SHK (A)	SAM (H)	SHR (H)	STR (A)
(Iceland) Breiðablik	0–3	0–0	0–2	2–2	3–1	1–3

Results by Pot 5 team
Team	Matchday					
Team	1	2	3	4	5	6
(Kosovo) Drita	KUP (A)	OMO (H)	SHL (A)	SKN (H)	AZ (H)	RAY (A)
(Kosovo) Drita	1–1	1–1	1–0	1–0	0–3	0–3
(Czech Republic) Sigma Olomouc	FIO (A)	RAK (H)	NOA (A)	CLJ (H)	LRI (A)	LCH (H)
(Czech Republic) Sigma Olomouc	0–2	1–1	2–1	2–1	1–2	1–2
(Turkey) Samsunspor	LEG (A)	DKV (H)	HAM (H)	BRD (A)	AEK (H)	MNZ (A)
(Turkey) Samsunspor	1–0	3–0	3–0	2–2	1–2	0–2
(Poland) Raków Częstochowa	UCR (H)	SIG (A)	SPP (A)	RWI (H)	ZRI (H)	OMO (A)
(Poland) Raków Częstochowa	2–0	1–1	0–0	4–1	1–0	1–0
(Cyprus) AEK Larnaca	AZ (H)	CRY (A)	ABE (H)	RJK (A)	HAC (A)	SKN (H)
(Cyprus) AEK Larnaca	4–0	1–0	0–0	0–0	1–1	1–0
(North Macedonia) Shkëndija	RAY (A)	SHL (H)	JAG (H)	DRI (A)	SLO (H)	LAR (A)
(North Macedonia) Shkëndija	0–2	1–0	1–1	0–1	2–0	0–1

Results by Pot 6 team
Team	Matchday					
Team	1	2	3	4	5	6
(Sweden) BK Häcken	SHL (A)	RAY (H)	STR (H)	ZRI (A)	LAR (H)	SLO (A)
(Sweden) BK Häcken	0–0	2–2	1–2	1–2	1–1	0–1
(Switzerland) Lausanne-Sport	BRD (H)	HAM (A)	OMO (H)	LCH (A)	KUP (A)	FIO (H)
(Switzerland) Lausanne-Sport	3–0	1–0	1–1	0–2	0–0	1–0
(Romania) Universitatea Craiova	RAK (A)	NOA (H)	RWI (A)	MNZ (H)	SPP (H)	AEK (A)
(Romania) Universitatea Craiova	0–2	1–1	1–0	1–0	1–2	2–3
(Malta) Hamrun Spartans	JAG (A)	LAU (H)	SAM (A)	LRI (H)	SHK (H)	SHR (A)
(Malta) Hamrun Spartans	0–1	0–1	0–3	3–1	0–2	1–3
(Armenia) Noah	RJK (H)	UCR (A)	SIG (H)	ABE (A)	LEG (H)	DKV (A)
(Armenia) Noah	1–0	1–1	1–2	1–1	2–1	0–2
(Republic of Ireland) Shelbourne	HAC (H)	SKN (A)	DRI (H)	AZ (A)	CRY (H)	CLJ (A)
(Republic of Ireland) Shelbourne	0–0	0–1	0–1	0–2	0–3	0–0

Source: UEFA
Scores and legend colours are listed from the perspective of the team in the "Team" column.
Legend: H = home, A = away. Green = win; Yellow = draw; Red = loss.

== Matches ==
The fixture list was announced on 30 August 2025, the day after the draw. This was to ensure no calendar clashes with teams in the Champions League and Europa League playing in the same cities.

In principle, each team did not play more than two home matches or two away matches in a row, and played one home match and one away match across both the first and last two matchdays. The matches were played on 2 October, 23 October, 6 November, 27 November, 11 December and 18 December 2025 (exclusive week). (Note: As part of the scheduling for the 2025–26 UEFA men's club season, each competition had an "exclusive week" in the calendar, with no other competitions scheduled during this week. For the Conference League, this took place on matchday 6 (18 December 2025).) All matches were generally played on Thursdays. In principle, the scheduled kick-off times were 16:30, 18:45 and 21:00 CET/CEST. All fixtures on the final matchday were played simultaneously at 21:00.

Times are CET or CEST, (Note: CEST (UTC+2) for dates up to 25 October 2025 (matchdays 1–2), and CET (UTC+1) for dates thereafter (matchdays 3–6).) as listed by UEFA (local times, if different, are in parentheses).

=== Matchday 1 ===
2 October 2025
18:45

Dynamo Kyiv (Ukrainian Association of Football)	0–2	(The Football Association) Crystal Palace
	Report	Muñoz 31'; Nketiah 58'

Arena Lublin, Lublin, Poland (Note: Due to the Russian invasion of Ukraine, Ukrainian teams were required to play their home matches at neutral venues until further notice. Therefore, Dynamo Kyiv played their home matches at Arena Lublin, Lublin, Poland, instead of their regular stadium, Olympic Stadium, Kyiv, while Shakhtar Donetsk played their home matches at Henryk Reyman Municipal Stadium, Kraków, Poland, instead of their regular stadium, Donbas Arena, Donetsk.)
Attendance: 6,839
Referee: Lothar D'Hondt (Belgium)

2 October 2025
18:45

Lausanne-Sport (Swiss Football Association)	3–0	(Football Association of Iceland) Breiðablik
Lekweiry 7'; Bair 11'; Diakité 33'	Report

Stade de la Tuilière, Lausanne
Attendance: 9,154
Referee: Genc Nuza (Kosovo)

2 October 2025
18:45 (20:45 UTC+4)

Noah (Football Federation of Armenia)	1–0	(Croatian Football Federation) Rijeka
Mulahusejnović 6'	Report

Vazgen Sargsyan Republican Stadium, Yerevan (Note: Noah played their home matches at Vazgen Sargsyan Republican Stadium, Yerevan, instead of their regular stadium, Armavir City Stadium, Armavir, which did not meet UEFA requirements.)
Attendance: 11,500
Referee: Radoslav Gidzhenov (Bulgaria)

2 October 2025
18:45

Zrinjski Mostar (Football Association of Bosnia and Herzegovina)	5–0	(Gibraltar Football Association) Lincoln Red Imps
Bilbija 12'; Dujmović 22'; Jakovljević 40'; Damașcan 69'; Mikić 85'	Report

Stadion pod Bijelim Brijegom, Mostar
Attendance: 4,200
Referee: Sigurd Kringstad (Norway)

2 October 2025
18:45

Jagiellonia Białystok (Polish Football Association)	1–0	(Malta Football Association) Hamrun Spartans
Imaz 57'	Report

Stadion Miejski, Białystok
Attendance: 17,469
Referee: Igor Stojchevski (North Macedonia)

2 October 2025
18:45

Lech Poznań (Polish Football Association)	4–1	(Austrian Football Association) Rapid Wien
Palma 13'; Ishak 21'; Ismaheel 45+2'; Bengtsson 77'	Report	Radulović 64'

Poznań Stadium, Poznań
Attendance: 24,779
Referee: Rob Hennessy (Republic of Ireland)

2 October 2025
18:45 (19:45 UTC+3)

KuPS (Football Association of Finland)	1–1	(Football Federation of Kosovo) Drita
Parzyszek 74'	Report	Dabiqaj 80'

Tammelan Stadion, Tampere (Note: KuPS played their home matches at Tammelan Stadion, Tampere, instead of their regular stadium, Kuopio Football Stadium, Kuopio, which did not meet UEFA requirements.)
Attendance: 2,129
Referee: Michal Očenáš (Slovakia)

2 October 2025
18:45 (19:45 UTC+3)

Omonia (Cyprus Football Association)	0–1	(German Football Association) Mainz 05
	Report	Amiri 75' (pen.)

GSP Stadium, Nicosia
Attendance: 12,548
Referee: Miloš Milanović (Serbia)

2 October 2025
18:45

Rayo Vallecano (Royal Spanish Football Federation)	2–0	(Football Federation of Macedonia) Shkëndija
López 28'; Pérez 32'	Report

Campo de Fútbol de Vallecas, Madrid
Attendance: 8,842
Referee: Mohammad Al-Emara (Finland)

2 October 2025
21:00 (20:00 UTC+1)

Aberdeen (Scottish Football Association)	2–3	(Ukrainian Association of Football) Shakhtar Donetsk
Karlsson 8' (pen.); Devlin 69'	Report	Nazaryna 39'; Ferreira 54'; Pedrinho 60'

Pittodrie Stadium, Aberdeen
Attendance: 15,504
Referee: Duje Strukan (Croatia)

2 October 2025
21:00

Sparta Prague (Football Association of the Czech Republic)	4–1	(Football Association of Ireland) Shamrock Rovers
Sadílek 33'; Suchomel 44'; Sørensen 50'; Haraslín 90'	Report	Mandroiu 82'

Stadion Letná, Prague
Attendance: 17,104
Referee: Atilla Karaoğlan (Turkey)

2 October 2025
21:00

Fiorentina (Italian Football Federation)	2–0	(Football Association of the Czech Republic) Sigma Olomouc
Piccoli 27'; Ndour 90+5'	Report

Stadio Artemio Franchi, Florence
Attendance: 8,149
Referee: Florian Badstübner (Germany)

2 October 2025
21:00 (22:00 UTC+3)

AEK Larnaca (Cyprus Football Association)	4–0	(Royal Dutch Football Association) AZ
Rubio 25'; Bajić 54'; Ivanović 73'; Rohdén 83'	Report

AEK Arena – Georgios Karapatakis, Larnaca
Attendance: 3,404
Referee: Daniel Schlager (Germany)

2 October 2025
21:00

Legia Warsaw (Polish Football Association)	0–1	(Turkish Football Federation) Samsunspor
	Report	Musaba 10'

Polish Army Stadium, Warsaw
Attendance: 18,712
Referee: Jérémie Pignard (France)

2 October 2025
21:00

Celje (Football Association of Slovenia)	3–1	(Hellenic Football Federation) AEK Athens
Kovačević 34', 55', 80'	Report	Kutesa 7'

Stadion Z'dežele, Celje
Attendance: 7,420
Referee: Oleksiy Derevinskyi (Ukraine)

2 October 2025
21:00

Raków Częstochowa (Polish Football Association)	2–0	(Romanian Football Federation) Universitatea Craiova
Pieńko 47'; Repka 80'	Report

Zagłębie Sports Park, Sosnowiec (Note: Raków Częstochowa played their home matches at Zagłębie Sports Park, Sosnowiec, instead of their regular stadium, Miejski Stadion Piłkarski Raków, Częstochowa, which did not meet UEFA requirements.)
Attendance: 6,557
Referee: Ishmael Barbara (Malta)

2 October 2025
21:00 (20:00 UTC+1)

Shelbourne (Football Association of Ireland)	0–0	(Swedish Football Association) BK Häcken
	Report

Tallaght Stadium, Dublin (Note: Shelbourne played their home matches at Tallaght Stadium, Dublin, instead of their regular stadium, Tolka Park, Dublin, which did not meet UEFA requirements.)
Attendance: 5,675
Referee: Paweł Raczkowski (Poland)

2 October 2025
21:00

Slovan Bratislava (Slovak Football Association)	1–2	(French Football Federation) Strasbourg
Ibrahim 64'	Report	Yirajang 26' (o.g.); Ouattara 41'

Tehelné pole, Bratislava
Attendance: 15,204
Referee: Andrea Colombo (Italy)

=== Matchday 2 ===
23 October 2025
18:45 (19:45 UTC+3)

AEK Athens (Hellenic Football Federation)	6–0	(Scottish Football Association) Aberdeen
Koïta 11', 18'; Eliasson 27'; Marin 55'; Jović 81'; Kutesa 87'	Report

Agia Sophia Stadium, Athens
Attendance: 20,921
Referee: Jasper Vergoote (Belgium)

23 October 2025
18:45

BK Häcken (Swedish Football Association)	2–2	(Royal Spanish Football Federation) Rayo Vallecano
Lindberg 41'; Brusberg 55'	Report	Á. García 15'; Rațiu 90+13' (pen.)

Gamla Ullevi, Gothenburg (Note: BK Häcken played their home matches at Gamla Ullevi, Gothenburg, instead of their regular stadium, Bravida Arena, Gothenburg, which did not meet UEFA requirements.)
Attendance: 6,408
Referee: Antoni Bandić (Bosnia and Herzegovina)

23 October 2025
18:45 (16:45 UTC+0)

Breiðablik (Football Association of Iceland)	0–0	(Football Association of Finland) KuPS
	Report

Laugardalsvöllur, Reykjavík (Note: Breiðablik played their home matches at Laugardalsvöllur, Reykjavík, instead of their regular stadium, Kópavogsvöllur, Kópavogur, which did not meet UEFA requirements.)
Attendance: 821
Referee: Sandi Putros (Denmark)

23 October 2025
18:45

Shakhtar Donetsk (Ukrainian Association of Football)	1–2	(Polish Football Association) Legia Warsaw
Luca Meirelles 61'	Report	Augustyniak 16', 90+4'

Henryk Reyman Municipal Stadium, Kraków, Poland
Attendance: 13,936
Referee: Gustavo Correia (Portugal)

23 October 2025
18:45

Drita (Football Federation of Kosovo)	1–1	(Cyprus Football Association) Omonia
Manaj 12'	Report	Masouras 45+1'

Fadil Vokrri Stadium, Pristina (Note: Drita played their home matches at Fadil Vokrri Stadium, Pristina, instead of their regular stadium, Gjilan City Stadium, Gjilan, due to renovation works.)
Attendance: 2,250
Referee: Rob Harvey (Republic of Ireland)

23 October 2025 (Note: The Rijeka v Sparta Prague match was abandoned at half-time due to adverse weather conditions. The match resumed on 24 October 2025, 16:00, from the point of abandonment.)
18:45

Rijeka (Croatian Football Federation)	1–0	(Football Association of the Czech Republic) Sparta Prague
Adu-Adjei 75'	Report

Stadion Rujevica, Rijeka
Attendance: 3,578
Referee: Robert Jones (England)

23 October 2025
18:45

Shkëndija (Football Federation of Macedonia)	1–0	(Football Association of Ireland) Shelbourne
Barrett 90+1' (o.g.)	Report

Toše Proeski Arena, Skopje (Note: Shkëndija played their home matches at Toše Proeski Arena, Skopje, instead of their regular stadium, Ecolog Arena, Tetovo, due to renovation works.)
Attendance: 2,051
Referee: Stefan Ebner (Austria)

23 October 2025
18:45

Strasbourg (French Football Federation)	1–1	(Polish Football Association) Jagiellonia Białystok
Panichelli 79'	Report	Stojinović 53'

Stade de la Meinau, Strasbourg
Attendance: 21,748
Referee: Dario Bel (Croatia)

23 October 2025
18:45

Rapid Wien (Austrian Football Association)	0–3	(Italian Football Federation) Fiorentina
	Report	Ndour 9'; Džeko 48'; Guðmundsson 88'

Allianz Stadion, Vienna
Attendance: 24,641
Referee: Yigal Frid (Israel)

23 October 2025
18:45 (Note: The AZ v Slovan Bratislava match, originally scheduled for 21:00, was moved forward to 18:45 due to adverse weather conditions.)

AZ (Royal Dutch Football Association)	1–0	(Slovak Football Association) Slovan Bratislava
Mijnans 44'	Report

AFAS Stadion, Alkmaar
Attendance: 12,086
Referee: Tobias Stieler (Germany)

23 October 2025
21:00

Mainz 05 (German Football Association)	1–0	(Football Association of Bosnia and Herzegovina) Zrinjski Mostar
Weiper 24'	Report

Mewa Arena, Mainz
Attendance: 30,200
Referee: Jamie Robinson (Northern Ireland)

23 October 2025
21:00 (20:00 UTC+1)

Crystal Palace (The Football Association)	0–1	(Cyprus Football Association) AEK Larnaca
	Report	Bajić 51'

Selhurst Park, London
Attendance: 23,038
Referee: Damian Kos (Poland)

23 October 2025
21:00

Hamrun Spartans (Malta Football Association)	0–1	(Swiss Football Association) Lausanne-Sport
	Report	Diakité 38'

National Stadium, Ta' Qali (Note: Hamrun Spartans played their home matches at National Stadium, Ta' Qali, instead of their regular stadium, Victor Tedesco Stadium, Hamrun, which did not meet UEFA requirements.)
Attendance: 3,198
Referee: Henrik Nalbandyan (Armenia)

23 October 2025
21:00

Lincoln Red Imps (Gibraltar Football Association)	2–1	(Polish Football Association) Lech Poznań
Gómez 33'; Rutjens 88'	Report	Ishak 77' (pen.)

Europa Sports Park, Gibraltar (Note: Lincoln Red Imps played their home matches at Europa Sports Park, instead of their regular stadium, Victoria Stadium in Gibraltar, due to renovation works.)
Attendance: 1,208
Referee: Chrysovalantis Theouli (Cyprus)

23 October 2025
21:00 (22:00 UTC+3)

Samsunspor (Turkish Football Federation)	3–0	(Ukrainian Association of Football) Dynamo Kyiv
Musaba 2'; Mouandilmadji 34'; Holse 62'	Report

Samsun 19 Mayıs Stadium, Samsun
Attendance: 13,580
Referee: Ívar Orri Kristjánsson (Iceland)

23 October 2025
21:00 (20:00 UTC+1)

Shamrock Rovers (Football Association of Ireland)	0–2	(Football Association of Slovenia) Celje
	Report	Kovačević 33', 40'

Tallaght Stadium, Dublin
Attendance: 6,076
Referee: Ondřej Berka (Czech Republic)

23 October 2025
21:00

Sigma Olomouc (Football Association of the Czech Republic)	1–1	(Polish Football Association) Raków Częstochowa
Král 83'	Report	Svarnas 90'

Andrův stadion, Olomouc
Attendance: 8,136
Referee: Pavle Ilić (Serbia)

23 October 2025
21:00 (22:00 UTC+3)

Universitatea Craiova (Romanian Football Federation)	1–1	(Football Federation of Armenia) Noah
Etim 38'	Report	Mulahusejnović 73'

Ion Oblemenco Stadium, Craiova
Attendance: 18,004
Referee: Gal Leibuvich (Israel)

=== Matchday 3 ===
6 November 2025
18:45

Mainz 05 (German Football Association)	2–1	(Italian Football Federation) Fiorentina
Hollerbach 68'; Lee Jae-sung 90+5'	Report	Sohm 16'

Mewa Arena, Mainz
Attendance: 30,300
Referee: Lawrence Visser (Belgium)

6 November 2025
18:45

Sparta Prague (Football Association of the Czech Republic)	0–0	(Polish Football Association) Raków Częstochowa
	Report

Stadion Letná, Prague
Attendance: 17,688
Referee: Joonas Jaanovits (Estonia)

6 November 2025
18:45 (19:45 UTC+2)

AEK Athens (Hellenic Football Federation)	1–1	(Football Association of Ireland) Shamrock Rovers
Jović 90' (pen.)	Report	Burke 21' (pen.)

Agia Sophia Stadium, Athens
Attendance: 20,210
Referee: José Luis Munuera Montero (Spain)

6 November 2025
18:45 (19:45 UTC+2)

AEK Larnaca (Cyprus Football Association)	0–0	(Scottish Football Association) Aberdeen
	Report

AEK Arena – Georgios Karapatakis, Larnaca
Attendance: 4,770
Referee: Dalibor Černý (Czech Republic)

6 November 2025
18:45

Shakhtar Donetsk (Ukrainian Association of Football)	2–0	(Football Association of Iceland) Breiðablik
Bondarenko 28'; Kauã Elias 65'	Report

Henryk Reyman Municipal Stadium, Kraków, Poland
Attendance: 5,252
Referee: Andrei Chivulete (Romania)

6 November 2025
18:45 (21:45 UTC+4)

Noah (Football Federation of Armenia)	1–2	(Football Association of the Czech Republic) Sigma Olomouc
Mulahusejnović 21'	Report	Slavíček 10'; Sylla 24'

Vazgen Sargsyan Republican Stadium, Yerevan
Attendance: 10,000
Referee: Mohammad Usman Aslam (Norway)

6 November 2025
18:45 (19:45 UTC+2)

KuPS (Football Association of Finland)	3–1	(Slovak Football Association) Slovan Bratislava
Antwi 41'; Parzyszek 48'; Oksanen 81'	Report	Marcelli 3'

Tammelan Stadion, Tampere
Attendance: 2,875
Referee: Christos Vergetis (Greece)

6 November 2025
18:45

Celje (Football Association of Slovenia)	2–1	(Polish Football Association) Legia Warsaw
Iosifov 72'; Karničnik 77'	Report	Urbański 17'

Stadion Z'dežele, Celje
Attendance: 8,000
Referee: Javier Alberola Rojas (Spain)

6 November 2025
18:45 (20:45 UTC+3)

Samsunspor (Turkish Football Federation)	3–0	(Malta Football Association) Hamrun Spartans
Holse 18'; Kılınç 58'; Mouandilmadji 77'	Report

Samsun 19 Mayıs Stadium, Samsun
Attendance: 17,600
Referee: Bulat Sariyev (Kazakhstan)

6 November 2025
21:00

BK Häcken (Swedish Football Association)	1–2	(French Football Federation) Strasbourg
Dembe 61'	Report	Enciso 21'; Godo 60'

Gamla Ullevi, Gothenburg
Attendance: 4,082
Referee: Luca Pairetto (Italy)

6 November 2025
21:00 (20:00 UTC+0)

Crystal Palace (The Football Association)	3–1	(Royal Dutch Football Association) AZ
Lacroix 22'; Sarr 45+4', 57'	Report	Mijnans 54'

Selhurst Park, London
Attendance: 21,459
Referee: Daniele Chiffi (Italy)

6 November 2025
21:00

Lausanne-Sport (Swiss Football Association)	1–1	(Cyprus Football Association) Omonia
Bair 40'	Report	Neophytou 34'

Stade de la Tuilière, Lausanne
Attendance: 9,873
Referee: Edgars Maļcevs (Latvia)

6 November 2025
21:00

Dynamo Kyiv (Ukrainian Association of Football)	6–0	(Football Association of Bosnia and Herzegovina) Zrinjski Mostar
Popov 21'; Guerrero 56'; Kabayev 59'; Buyalskyi 67'; Yarmolenko 78'; Blănuță 83'	Report

Arena Lublin, Lublin, Poland
Attendance: 1,576
Referee: Marc Nagtegaal (Netherlands)

6 November 2025
21:00

Shkëndija (Football Federation of Macedonia)	1–1	(Polish Football Association) Jagiellonia Białystok
Latifi 49'	Report	Lozano 90+10'

Toše Proeski Arena, Skopje
Attendance: 2,411
Referee: Mihály Káprály (Hungary)

6 November 2025
21:00

Lincoln Red Imps (Gibraltar Football Association)	1–1	(Croatian Football Federation) Rijeka
Gómez 83'	Report	Fruk 41'

Europa Sports Park, Gibraltar
Attendance: 1,194
Referee: Philip Farrugia (Malta)

6 November 2025
21:00

Rayo Vallecano (Royal Spanish Football Federation)	3–2	(Polish Football Association) Lech Poznań
Palazón 58'; De Frutos 83'; García 90+4'	Report	Palma 11'; Kozubal 39'

Campo de Fútbol de Vallecas, Madrid
Attendance: 10,029
Referee: Viktor Kopiyevskyi (Ukraine)

6 November 2025
21:00 (20:00 UTC+0)

Shelbourne (Football Association of Ireland)	0–1	(Football Federation of Kosovo) Drita
	Report	Ajzeraj 57'

Tallaght Stadium, Dublin
Attendance: 4,503
Referee: Oliver Reitala (Finland)

6 November 2025
21:00

Rapid Wien (Austrian Football Association)	0–1	(Romanian Football Federation) Universitatea Craiova
	Report	Romanchuk 37'

Allianz Stadion, Vienna
Attendance: 23,457
Referee: Martin Matoša (Slovenia)

=== Matchday 4 ===
27 November 2025
18:45

AZ (Royal Dutch Football Association)	2–0	(Football Association of Ireland) Shelbourne
De Wit 70'; Jensen 86'	Report

AFAS Stadion, Alkmaar
Attendance: 15,210
Referee: Michal Očenáš (Slovakia)

27 November 2025
18:45

Hamrun Spartans (Malta Football Association)	3–1	(Gibraltar Football Association) Lincoln Red Imps
El Fanis 65'; Smajlagić 74'; Ćorić 90+2'	Report	Lopes 57'

National Stadium, Ta' Qali
Attendance: 2,134
Referee: Jovan Kacevski (North Macedonia)

27 November 2025
18:45

Zrinjski Mostar (Football Association of Bosnia and Herzegovina)	2–1	(Swedish Football Association) BK Häcken
Ćuže 78'; Bilbija 82'	Report	Andersen 40'

Stadion pod Bijelim Brijegom, Mostar
Attendance: 3,100
Referee: Christian-Petru Ciochirca (Austria)

27 November 2025
18:45

Lech Poznań (Polish Football Association)	2–0	(Swiss Football Association) Lausanne-Sport
Ismaheel 67'; Agnero 90+5'	Report

Poznań Stadium, Poznań
Attendance: 19,728
Referee: Sigurd Kringstad (Norway)

27 November 2025
18:45 (19:45 UTC+2)

Omonia (Cyprus Football Association)	2–0	(Ukrainian Association of Football) Dynamo Kyiv
Semedo 34' (pen.); Neophytou 59'	Report

GSP Stadium, Nicosia
Attendance: 8,979
Referee: Radoslav Gidzhenov (Bulgaria)

27 November 2025
18:45

Raków Częstochowa (Polish Football Association)	4–1	(Austrian Football Association) Rapid Wien
Brunes 27' (pen.); Diaby-Fadiga 40', 51', 53'	Report	Antiste 75'

Zagłębie Sports Park, Sosnowiec
Attendance: 8,457
Referee: Duje Strukan (Croatia)

27 November 2025
18:45

Sigma Olomouc (Football Association of the Czech Republic)	2–1	(Football Association of Slovenia) Celje
Ghali 8', 42'	Report	Vidović 29'

Andrův stadion, Olomouc
Attendance: 7,267
Referee: Genc Nuza (Kosovo)

27 November 2025
18:45 (19:45 UTC+2)

Universitatea Craiova (Romanian Football Federation)	1–0	(German Football Association) Mainz 05
Al Hamlawi 67' (pen.)	Report

Ion Oblemenco Stadium, Craiova
Attendance: 24,284
Referee: Dario Bel (Croatia)

27 November 2025
18:45

Slovan Bratislava (Slovak Football Association)	2–1	(Royal Spanish Football Federation) Rayo Vallecano
Kashia 49'; Yirajang 52'	Report	Pérez 24'

Tehelné pole, Bratislava
Attendance: 16,502
Referee: Lawrence Visser (Belgium)

27 November 2025
21:00 (20:00 UTC+0)

Aberdeen (Scottish Football Association)	1–1	(Football Federation of Armenia) Noah
Nisbet 45'	Report	Mulahusejnović 52'

Pittodrie Stadium, Aberdeen
Attendance: 15,060
Referee: Paweł Raczkowski (Poland)

27 November 2025
21:00

Fiorentina (Italian Football Federation)	0–1	(Hellenic Football Federation) AEK Athens
	Report	Gaćinović 35'

Stadio Artemio Franchi, Florence
Attendance: 10,964
Referee: Robert Jones (England)

27 November 2025
21:00 (20:00 UTC+0)

Breiðablik (Football Association of Iceland)	2–2	(Turkish Football Federation) Samsunspor
Ingvarsson 6'; Kristinsson 72'	Report	Mouandilmadji 20', 55'

Laugardalsvöllur, Reykjavík
Attendance: 950
Referee: Denys Shurman (Ukraine)

27 November 2025
21:00

Drita (Football Federation of Kosovo)	1–0	(Football Federation of Macedonia) Shkëndija
Manaj 20'	Report

Fadil Vokrri Stadium, Pristina
Attendance: 6,935
Referee: Mikkel Redder (Denmark)

27 November 2025
21:00

Rijeka (Croatian Football Federation)	0–0	(Cyprus Football Association) AEK Larnaca
	Report

Stadion Rujevica, Rijeka
Attendance: 5,461
Referee: Rob Hennessy (Republic of Ireland)

27 November 2025
21:00

Jagiellonia Białystok (Polish Football Association)	1–0	(Football Association of Finland) KuPS
Pululu 51'	Report

Stadion Miejski, Białystok
Attendance: 12,369
Referee: Gustavo Correia (Portugal)

27 November 2025
21:00

Legia Warsaw (Polish Football Association)	0–1	(Football Association of the Czech Republic) Sparta Prague
	Report	Preciado 41'

Polish Army Stadium, Warsaw
Attendance: 17,743
Referee: Anastasios Sidiropoulos (Greece)

27 November 2025
21:00

Strasbourg (French Football Federation)	2–1	(The Football Association) Crystal Palace
Emegha 53'; El Mourabet 77'	Report	Mitchell 35'

Stade de la Meinau, Strasbourg
Attendance: 29,528
Referee: Javier Alberola Rojas (Spain)

27 November 2025
21:00 (20:00 UTC+0)

Shamrock Rovers (Football Association of Ireland)	1–2	(Ukrainian Association of Football) Shakhtar Donetsk
Malley 87'	Report	Kauã Elias 23'; Nazaryna 77'

Tallaght Stadium, Dublin
Attendance: 9,226
Referee: Filip Glova (Slovakia)

=== Matchday 5 ===
11 December 2025
18:45

Fiorentina (Italian Football Federation)	2–1	(Ukrainian Association of Football) Dynamo Kyiv
Kean 18'; Guðmundsson 74'	Report	Mykhaylenko 55'

Stadio Artemio Franchi, Florence
Attendance: 8,750
Referee: Miloš Milanović (Serbia)

11 December 2025
18:45

BK Häcken (Swedish Football Association)	1–1	(Cyprus Football Association) AEK Larnaca
Hammar 90+4'	Report	Helander 65' (o.g.)

Gamla Ullevi, Gothenburg
Attendance: 4,412
Referee: Yigal Frid (Israel)

11 December 2025
18:45 (17:45 UTC+0)

Breiðablik (Football Association of Iceland)	3–1	(Football Association of Ireland) Shamrock Rovers
Margeirsson 35'; Ómarsson 74'; K. Jónsson 90+2'	Report	Burke 32'

Laugardalsvöllur, Reykjavík
Attendance: 1,003
Referee: Enea Jorgji (Albania)

11 December 2025
18:45

Drita (Football Federation of Kosovo)	0–3	(Royal Dutch Football Association) AZ
	Report	Mijnans 17'; Jensen 58'; Sadiq 90'

Fadil Vokrri Stadium, Pristina
Attendance: 2,231
Referee: Dalibor Černý (Czech Republic)

11 December 2025
18:45 (21:45 UTC+4)

Noah (Football Federation of Armenia)	2–1	(Polish Football Association) Legia Warsaw
Aiás 57'; Mulahusejnović 84'	Report	Rajović 3'

Vazgen Sargsyan Republican Stadium, Yerevan
Attendance: 8,500
Referee: Bulat Sariyev (Kazakhstan)

11 December 2025
18:45

Jagiellonia Białystok (Polish Football Association)	1–2	(Royal Spanish Football Federation) Rayo Vallecano
Imaz 44'	Report	Camello 6'; Espino 61'

Stadion Miejski, Białystok
Attendance: 17,534
Referee: Edgars Maļcevs (Latvia)

11 December 2025
18:45

Shkëndija (Football Federation of Macedonia)	2–0	(Slovak Football Association) Slovan Bratislava
Bajrić 33' (o.g.); Spahiu 45+1'	Report

Toše Proeski Arena, Skopje
Attendance: 1,497
Referee: Ívar Orri Kristjánsson (Iceland)

11 December 2025
18:45 (20:45 UTC+3)

Samsunspor (Turkish Football Federation)	1–2	(Hellenic Football Federation) AEK Athens
Moukoudi 4' (o.g.)	Report	Marin 52'; Koita 63'

Samsun 19 Mayıs Stadium, Samsun
Attendance: 19,382
Referee: Jérémie Pignard (France)

11 December 2025
18:45 (19:45 UTC+2)

Universitatea Craiova (Romanian Football Federation)	1–2	(Football Association of the Czech Republic) Sparta Prague
Nsimba 79'	Report	Rrahmani 50'; Ryneš 89'

Ion Oblemenco Stadium, Craiova
Attendance: 20,210
Referee: Jasper Vergoote (Belgium)

11 December 2025
21:00 (20:00 UTC+0)

Aberdeen (Scottish Football Association)	0–1	(French Football Federation) Strasbourg
	Report	Godo 35'

Pittodrie Stadium, Aberdeen
Attendance: 15,404
Referee: Robert Schröder (Germany)

11 December 2025
21:00

Hamrun Spartans (Malta Football Association)	0–2	(Ukrainian Association of Football) Shakhtar Donetsk
	Report	Luca Meirelles 61'; Isaque 64'

National Stadium, Ta' Qali
Attendance: 2,578
Referee: Florian Badstübner (Germany)

11 December 2025
21:00

Rijeka (Croatian Football Federation)	3–0	(Football Association of Slovenia) Celje
Adu-Adjei 55'; Petrovič 71'; Fruk 78'	Report

Stadion Rujevica, Rijeka
Attendance: 5,693
Referee: Andrea Colombo (Italy)

11 December 2025
21:00

Lech Poznań (Polish Football Association)	1–1	(German Football Association) Mainz 05
Ishak 41' (pen.)	Report	Kawasaki 28'

Poznań Stadium, Poznań
Attendance: 28,139
Referee: Andrei Chivulete (Romania)

11 December 2025
21:00 (22:00 UTC+2)

KuPS (Football Association of Finland)	0–0	(Swiss Football Association) Lausanne-Sport
	Report

Tammelan Stadion, Tampere
Attendance: 2,274
Referee: Oleksiy Derevinskyi (Ukraine)

11 December 2025
21:00

Lincoln Red Imps (Gibraltar Football Association)	2–1	(Football Association of the Czech Republic) Sigma Olomouc
Koutný 19' (o.g.); Pozo 73'	Report	Vašulín 8'

Europa Sports Park, Gibraltar
Attendance: 686
Referee: Bence Csonka (Hungary)

11 December 2025
21:00

Raków Częstochowa (Polish Football Association)	1–0	(Football Association of Bosnia and Herzegovina) Zrinjski Mostar
Brunes 45+5' (pen.)	Report

Zagłębie Sports Park, Sosnowiec
Attendance: 7,254
Referee: Ondřej Berka (Czech Republic)

11 December 2025
21:00 (20:00 UTC+0)

Shelbourne (Football Association of Ireland)	0–3	(The Football Association) Crystal Palace
	Report	Uche 11'; Nketiah 25'; Yéremy 37'

Tallaght Stadium, Dublin
Attendance: 10,134
Referee: Martin Matoša (Slovenia)

11 December 2025
21:00

Rapid Wien (Austrian Football Association)	0–1	(Cyprus Football Association) Omonia
	Report	Neophytou 19'

Allianz Stadion, Vienna
Attendance: 17,714
Referee: Joey Kooij (Netherlands)

=== Matchday 6 ===
18 December 2025
21:00

Mainz 05 (German Football Association)	2–0	(Turkish Football Federation) Samsunspor
Widmer 44'; Amiri 48' (pen.)	Report

Mewa Arena, Mainz
Attendance: 33,000
Referee: Mohammad Al-Emara (Finland)

18 December 2025
21:00

Sparta Prague (Football Association of the Czech Republic)	3–0	(Scottish Football Association) Aberdeen
Mercado 16'; Haraslín 29'; Kuol 66'	Report

Stadion Letná, Prague
Attendance: 14,343
Referee: David Šmajc (Slovenia)

18 December 2025
21:00 (22:00 UTC+2)

AEK Athens (Hellenic Football Federation)	3–2	(Romanian Football Federation) Universitatea Craiova
Vida 65'; Kutesa 90+8'; Jović 90+14' (pen.)	Report	Baiaram 30'; Cicâldău 59'

Agia Sophia Stadium, Athens
Attendance: 26,021
Referee: Giorgi Kruashvili (Georgia)

18 December 2025
21:00 (22:00 UTC+2)

AEK Larnaca (Cyprus Football Association)	1–0	(Football Federation of Macedonia) Shkëndija
Angielski 83'	Report

AEK Arena – Georgios Karapatakis, Larnaca
Attendance: 3,269
Referee: Manfredas Lukjančukas (Lithuania)

18 December 2025
21:00

AZ (Royal Dutch Football Association)	0–0	(Polish Football Association) Jagiellonia Białystok
	Report

AFAS Stadion, Alkmaar
Attendance: 13,017
Referee: Stefan Ebner (Austria)

18 December 2025
21:00 (20:00 UTC+0)

Crystal Palace (The Football Association)	2–2	(Football Association of Finland) KuPS
Uche 5'; Devenny 76'	Report	Parzyszek 50'; Cissé 53'

Selhurst Park, London
Attendance: 21,306
Referee: Yigal Frid (Israel)

18 December 2025
21:00

Shakhtar Donetsk (Ukrainian Association of Football)	0–0	(Croatian Football Federation) Rijeka
	Report

Henryk Reyman Municipal Stadium, Kraków, Poland
Attendance: 4,367
Referee: Anthony Taylor (England)

18 December 2025
21:00

Dynamo Kyiv (Ukrainian Association of Football)	2–0	(Football Federation of Armenia) Noah
Kabayev 27'; Ponomarenko 50'	Report

Arena Lublin, Lublin, Poland
Attendance: 640
Referee: Juxhin Xhaja (Albania)

18 December 2025
21:00

Lausanne-Sport (Swiss Football Association)	1–0	(Italian Football Federation) Fiorentina
Sigua 58'	Report

Stade de la Tuilière, Lausanne
Attendance: 11,971
Referee: Lothar D'Hondt (Belgium)

18 December 2025
21:00

Zrinjski Mostar (Football Association of Bosnia and Herzegovina)	1–1	(Austrian Football Association) Rapid Wien
Cvetković 90+3' (o.g.)	Report	Schaub 11'

Stadion pod Bijelim Brijegom, Mostar
Attendance: 5,601
Referee: Ishmael Barbara (Malta)

18 December 2025
21:00

Legia Warsaw (Polish Football Association)	4–1	(Gibraltar Football Association) Lincoln Red Imps
Čolak 21'; Kapustka 62'; Rajović 70'; Bichakhchyan 83'	Report	De Barr 89'

Polish Army Stadium, Warsaw
Attendance: 9,429
Referee: Danilo Nikolić (Serbia)

18 December 2025
21:00

Celje (Football Association of Slovenia)	0–0	(Football Association of Ireland) Shelbourne
	Report

Stadion Z'dežele, Celje
Attendance: 5,240
Referee: Sandi Putros (Denmark)

18 December 2025
21:00 (22:00 UTC+2)

Omonia (Cyprus Football Association)	0–1	(Polish Football Association) Raków Częstochowa
	Report	Repka 49'

GSP Stadium, Nicosia
Attendance: 10,327
Referee: Sandro Schärer (Switzerland)

18 December 2025
21:00

Strasbourg (French Football Federation)	3–1	(Football Association of Iceland) Breiðablik
Nanasi 11'; Godo 80'; Enciso 90+4'	Report	Gunnlaugsson 37'

Stade de la Meinau, Strasbourg
Attendance: 24,416
Referee: Ondřej Berka (Czech Republic)

18 December 2025
21:00

Rayo Vallecano (Royal Spanish Football Federation)	3–0	(Football Federation of Kosovo) Drita
Lejeune 33'; Gumbau 66'; Espino 83'	Report

Campo de Fútbol de Vallecas, Madrid
Attendance: 9,300
Referee: Urs Schnyder (Switzerland)

18 December 2025
21:00 (20:00 UTC+0)

Shamrock Rovers (Football Association of Ireland)	3–1	(Malta Football Association) Hamrun Spartans
Burke 14' (pen.); Grant 45+4'; McGovern 90+3'	Report	Koffi 20'

Tallaght Stadium, Dublin
Attendance: 5,810
Referee: Marek Radina (Czech Republic)

18 December 2025
21:00

Sigma Olomouc (Football Association of the Czech Republic)	1–2	(Polish Football Association) Lech Poznań
Král 84'	Report	Ishak 35', 45+1' (pen.)

Andrův stadion, Olomouc
Attendance: 6,267
Referee: Patrik Kolarić (Croatia)

18 December 2025
21:00

Slovan Bratislava (Slovak Football Association)	1–0	(Swedish Football Association) BK Häcken
Blackman 85'	Report

Tehelné pole, Bratislava
Attendance: 7,879
Referee: Florian Lata (Albania)
