= Sandro Cruz =

Portuguese footballer

Personal information
- Full name: Sandro Plínio Rosa da Cruz
- Date of birth: 12 May 2001 (age 25)
- Place of birth: Braga, Portugal
- Height: 1.82 m (6 ft 0 in)
- Position: Left-back

Team information
- Current team: Slovan Bratislava
- Number: 57

Youth career
- 2010–2014: Braga
- 2014–2021: Benfica

Senior career*
Years	Team	Apps	(Gls)
2021–2023	Benfica B	36	(0)
2022–2023	Benfica	2	(0)
2022–2023	→ Chaves (loan)	13	(0)
2023–2024	Chaves	24	(1)
2024–2025	Gil Vicente	25	(0)
2025–	Slovan Bratislava	34	(1)

International career^{‡}
2017	Portugal U16	6	(0)
2017–2018	Portugal U17	7	(0)
2024–	Angola	7	(0)
Medal record
Men's football
Representing Angola
COSAFA Cup
Winner	2024 South Africa
- * Club domestic league appearances and goals as of 31 October 2026 ‡ National team caps and goals as of 11 October 2024

Sandro Plínio Rosa da Cruz (born 12 May 2001) is a professional footballer who plays as a left-back for Niké liga club Slovan Bratislava. Born in Portugal, he represents Angola internationally.

== Club career ==
On 27 June 2020, Cruz signed a professional contract with Benfica B. He made his professional debut with Benfica B in a 2–0 LigaPro win over Casa Pia on 7 February 2021.

On 10 July 2024, Cruz signed a three-year contract with Gil Vicente F.C.

In June 2025, it was announced that the player had been transferred to the club ŠK Slovan Bratislava.

== International career ==
Cruz made his debut for the Angola national team on 7 June 2024 in a World Cup qualifier against Eswatini at the Estádio 11 de Novembro. He started the game and played 81 minutes in Angola's 1–0 victory.

== Personal life ==
Cruz is the son of the Angolan handball player Filipe Cruz.

== Career statistics ==
=== Club ===
As of match played 3 November 2026

Appearances and goals by club, season and competition
Club	Season	League			National cup		League Cup		Europe		Total	
Club	Season	Division	Apps	Goals	Apps	Goals	Apps	Goals	Apps	Goals	Apps	Goals
Benfica B	2020–21	Liga Portugal 2	10	0	—		—		—		10	0
Benfica B	2021–22	Liga Portugal 2	26	0	—		—		—		26	0
Benfica B	Total		36	0	—		—		—		36	0
Benfica	2021–22	Primeira Liga	2	0	0	0	0	0	0	0	2	0
Chaves (loan)	2022–23	Primeira Liga	13	0	1	0	2	0	—		16	0
Chaves	2023–24	Primeira Liga	24	1	1	0	1	0	—		26	1
Gil Vicente	2024–25	Primeira Liga	25	0	4	0	0	0	—		29	0
Slovan Bratislava	2025–26	Slovak First Football League	28	1	3	0	—		10 (Note: Four appearances in UEFA Champions League, two appearances in UEFA Europa League, four appearances in UEFA Conference League)	0	41	1
Slovan Bratislava	2026–27	Slovak First Football League	6	0	0	0	—		10 (Note: Appearances in UEFA Champions League)	0	16	0
Slovan Bratislava	Total		34	1	3	0	—		20	0	57	1
Career total			134	2	9	0	1	0	20	0	163	2

=== International ===
As of matches played 11 October 2024

Appearances and goals by national team and year
National team	Year	Apps	Goals
Angola	2024	7	0
Total		7	0
