= Sidoine Fogning =

Cameroonian footballer (born 2001)

Personal information
- Full name: Sidoine Chounkwi Fogning
- Date of birth: 14 November 2001 (age 24)
- Place of birth: Yaoundé, Cameroon
- Height: 1.95 m (6 ft 5 in)
- Position: Centre-back

Team information
- Current team: FK Žalgiris

Senior career*
Years	Team	Apps	(Gls)
–2023	YOSA		
2023–2024	SC Coimbrões		
2025–2026	Boavista	13	(0)
2025–2026	→ Slovan Bratislava (loan)	4	(0)
2026–	FK Žalgiris	0	(0)

International career^{‡}
- Cameroon U-23
- * Club domestic league appearances and goals as of 22 November 2025 ‡ National team caps and goals as of 4 August 2025

Sidoine Chounkwi Fogning (born 14 November 2001) is a Cameroonian professional footballer who plays as a centre-back.

== Club career ==
=== Boavista F.C. ===
On 11 February 2025, Fogning joined Boavista from the Portugal club SC Coimbrões.

=== ŠK Slovan Bratislava ===
On 4 August 2025, Fogning signed a one-year loan, with option to buy with Slovan Bratislava.

== Career statistics ==
As of match played 22 November 2025

Appearances and goals by club, season and competition
Club	Season	League			Cup		League Cup		Europe		Total	
Club	Season	Division	Apps	Goals	Apps	Goals	Apps	Goals	Apps	Goals	Apps	Goals
Boavista	2024–25	Primeira Liga	13	0	—		—		—		13	0
Slovan Bratislava (loan)	2025–26	Slovak First Football League	4	0	2	0	—		2 (Note: One appearance in UEFA Europa League, one appearance in UEFA Conference League)	0	8	0
Career total			17	0	2	0	0	0	2	0	21	0
