= Mykola Kukharevych =

Ukrainian footballer (born 2001)

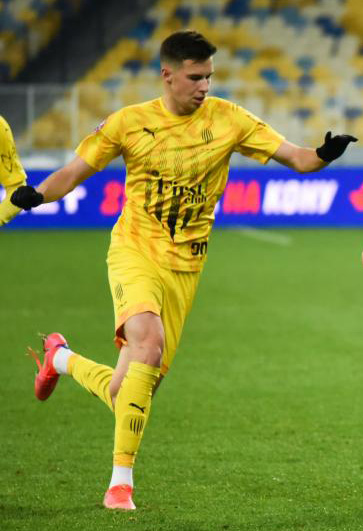
- Mykola Kukharevych playing for Rukh Lviv in 2021

Personal information
- Full name: Mykola Ihorovych Kukharevych
- Date of birth: 1 July 2001 (age 25)
- Place of birth: Udrytsk, Rivne Oblast, Ukraine
- Height: 1.93 m (6 ft 4 in)
- Position: Forward

Team information
- Current team: Slovan Bratislava
- Number: 9

Youth career
- 2014–2018: Volyn Lutsk

Senior career*
Years	Team	Apps	(Gls)
2018–2020	Volyn Lutsk	0	(0)
2020–2021	Rukh Lviv	24	(4)
2021–2023	Troyes	2	(0)
2021–2022	→ OH Leuven (loan)	10	(0)
2022	→ OH Leuven U23 (loan)	2	(0)
2022–2023	→ Hibernian (loan)	15	(5)
2023–2025	Swansea City	10	(1)
2024–2025	→ Hibernian (loan)	25	(6)
2025–	Slovan Bratislava	15	(7)

International career^{‡}
2020–2023	Ukraine U21	15	(3)
2024	Ukraine U23	1	(0)
- * Club domestic league appearances and goals as of 26 July 2026 ‡ National team caps and goals as of 25 March 2024

Mykola Ihorovych Kukharevych (Ukrainian: Микола Ігорович Кухаревич; born 1 July 2001) is a Ukrainian professional footballer who plays as a forward for Slovak First League club Slovan Bratislava.

== Career ==
Born in Dubrovytsia Raion, Kukharevych is a product of the Volyn Lutsk sportive school system.

He was promoted to the Ukrainian Premier League along with his team Rukh Lviv and made his debut in the Ukrainian Premier League for Rukh on 23 August 2020, playing as the start-squad player in a losing away match against FC Vorskla Poltava.

Following the weeks of rumors on 17 December 2020 Hryhoriy Kozlovskyi, the president of Rukh Lviv confirmed the preliminary agreement for Kukharevych transfer to Anderlecht, which should be announced officially in January 2021 with the opening of winter transfer window. The transfer was not finalized, instead in on 26 March Rukh Lviv made an announcement of the deal on Kuharevich transfer to Troyes AC on 1 July 2021.

In September 2022, Kukharevych joined Scottish Premiership side Hibernian on loan until the end of the season. Kukharevych scored his first Hibernian goal in a 2–1 home defeat against St Johnstone on 21 October. He missed a few months of playing time due to a medial ligament injury, returning to action in early March with a goal in a 4–1 win against Livingston.

In July 2023, Kukharevych joined EFL Championship club Swansea City on a permanent signing. On 3 August 2024, he joined Hibernian on loan for the second time. He scored his first goal in his second loan period for Hibs against Celtic at Celtic Park in the Scottish League Cup on Sunday 18th August 2024.

== Career statistics ==
As of match played 11 August 2026

Appearances and goals by club, season and competition
Club	Season	League			National cup (Note: Includes Belgian Cup, FA Cup, Scottish Cup, Slovak Cup)		League cup (Note: Includes EFL Cup, Scottish League Cup)		Europe		Total	
Club	Season	Division	Apps	Goals	Apps	Goals	Apps	Goals	Apps	Goals	Apps	Goals
Rukh Lviv	2019–20	Ukrainian First League	6	2	0	0	—		—		6	2
Rukh Lviv	2020–21	Ukrainian Premier League	18	2	0	0	—		—		18	2
Rukh Lviv	Total		24	4	0	0	—		—		24	4
Troyes	2021–22	Ligue 1	2	0	0	0	—		—		2	0
Troyes	2022–23	Ligue 1	0	0	0	0	—		—		0	0
Troyes	Total		2	0	0	0	—		—		2	0
OH Leuven (loan)	2021–22	Belgian First Division A	6	0	1	0	—		—		7	0
OH Leuven (loan)	2022–23	Belgian Pro League	4	0	0	0	—		—		4	0
OH Leuven (loan)	Total		10	0	1	0	—		—		11	0
OH Leuven U23 (loan)	2022–23	Belgian National Division 1	2	0	—		—		—		2	0
Hibernian (loan)	2022–23	Scottish Premiership	15	5	0	0	0	0	—		15	5
Swansea City	2023–24	Championship	9	1	1	0	2	0	—		12	1
Hibernian (loan)	2024–25	Scottish Premiership	25	1	2	0	1	1	0	0	28	1
Slovan Bratislava	2025–26	Slovak First Football League	14	6	3	3	—		7 (Note: Four appearances and one goal in UEFA Champions League, two appearances in UEFA Europa League, one appearance in UEFA Conference League)	1	24	10
Slovan Bratislava	2026–27	Slovak First Football League	1	1	0	0	—		4 (Note: Appearances in UEFA Champions League)	1	5	2
Slovan Bratislava	Total		15	7	3	3	—		11	2	29	12
Career total			101	18	5	3	10	2	11	2	127	25

== Honours ==
Slovan Bratislava

- Fortuna Liga: 2025–26
