= Nino Marcelli (Slovak footballer) =

Slovak footballer (born 2005)

Personal information
- Date of birth: 29 May 2005 (age 21)
- Place of birth: Bratislava, Slovakia
- Height: 1.78 m (5 ft 10 in)
- Position: Left winger

Team information
- Current team: Slovan Bratislava
- Number: 10

Youth career
- 2011–2014: Karlova Ves Bratislava
- 2014–2022: Slovan Bratislava

Senior career*
| Years | Team | Apps | (Gls) |
| 2022−2023 | Slovan Bratislava B | 17 | (3) |
| 2023− | Slovan Bratislava | 91 | (20) |

International career^{‡}
| 2023 | Slovakia U19 | 3 | (0) |
| 2023 | Slovakia U20 | 3 | (0) |
| 2023–2026 | Slovakia U21 | 27 | (8) |
| 2026– | Slovakia | 2 | (0) |
- * Club domestic league appearances and goals as of 31 October 2026 ‡ National team caps and goals as of 18 November 2026

Nino Marcelli (born 29 May 2005) is a Slovak professional footballer who plays as a left winger for Slovan Bratislava of the Niké Liga and the Slovakia national team.

== Biography ==
Marcelli was born in Bratislava on 29 May 2005. His Italian surname originated with a distant ancestor. When he was 16, his career nearly ended due to a muscle injury suffered at an AS Roma trial.

== Club career ==
=== Slovan Bratislava ===
==== 2023–24 season ====
In the summer of 2023, Marcelli attended a training camp in Austria with the "A" team, where he played in a friendly match against Slovenian team Olimpija Ljubljana. With Slovan, they qualified for the group stage of the 2023–24 UEFA Conference League, where they finished second in the table with ten points and advanced to the knockout stage of this competition for the second time in a row. However, the team were eliminated in the first round after losing 4–1 and 1–0 to Sturm Graz. In total, Marcelli played eight matches in that year's Conference League, in which he did not score a goal.

He made his league debut in the Slovan Bratislava jersey in the first round against then league newcomer FC Košice, playing 80 minutes. On 31 July 2023, Marcelli signed a new four-year contract with the club. He scored his first goal in the top flight for Slovan on 12 August 2023 in a match against MFK Skalica, opening the scoring in the 21st minute. He scored his second and third goals of the season in the fourth round against Zemplín Michalovce, scoring in the 4th and 23rd minutes. The following match against Banská Bystrica there was also two goals for Marcelli.

In the spring part of the season, he managed to score five more goals. During his debut season, he played in 26 matches, in which he had 10 goals and 2 assists. With his play, he helped Slovan to its sixth league title in a row and the 30th overall in the team's history.

==== 2024–25 season ====
With Slovan, he advanced in the fall of 2024 qualifying round teams FC Struga, NK Celje, APOEL FC and FC Midtjylland from the first qualifying round to the main part of the 2024–25 UEFA Champions League, which the Bratislava team reached for the first time in its history. In the league phase, which was then playing in a new format, they met with the clubs Celtic FC, Manchester City, AC Milan, Girona FC, GNK Dinamo Zagreb, against whom Marcelli started every match, but the team failed to score a single point. In the next and closest match so far against the current vice-champion of the Italian league AC Milan, the young winger scored his first goal in European club competitions in the 88th minute with a shot from outside the penalty area, thus adjusting the result to 2–3 and giving his team hope for the first points in the table. However, the team failed to score another goal. After this match, Marcelli became the most expensive player in the Slovak league and impressed AC Milan with his play. They made an offer to buy the Slovak player, but Slovan rejected it.

He scored his first goal in the domestic league in the 2024–25 season in the opening match against KFC Komárno, when he put Slovan ahead for the second time in the 43rd minute.

== International career ==
Marcelli is a youth representative of Slovakia. He played for the U15, U16, U19 teams and is currently playing for the under-20 and under-21 teams. He was at the World Cup with the U20 category of the local team, where he and the team advanced from the group stage after a single win over Fiji. However, they subsequently lost to Colombia 5–1 in the knockout stage. Marcelli did not manage to score a goal during the championship.

He has also played with the Slovakia under-21 in the 2025 under-21s European championship.

== Career statistics ==
As of match played 3 November 2026

Appearances and goals by club, season and competition
| Club | Season | League | | | Cup | | Europe | | Other | | Total | |
| Club | Season | Division | Apps | Goals | Apps | Goals | Apps | Goals | Apps | Goals | Apps | Goals |
|---|---|---|---|---|---|---|---|---|---|---|---|---|
| Slovan Bratislava B | 2022–23 | 2. Liga | 16 | 3 | — | | — | | — | | 16 | 3 |
| Slovan Bratislava B | 2023–24 | 2. Liga | 1 | 0 | — | | — | | — | | 1 | 0 |
| Slovan Bratislava B | Total | | 17 | 3 | — | | — | | — | | 17 | 3 |
| Slovan Bratislava | 2023–24 | Slovak First Football League | 26 | 10 | 2 | 0 | 8 (Note: Three appearances in UEFA Champions League, two appearances in UEFA Europa League, three appearances in UEFA Conference League) | 0 | — | | 36 | 10 |
| Slovan Bratislava | 2024–25 | Slovak First Football League | 29 | 3 | 4 | 1 | 15 (Note: Appearances in UEFA Champions League) | 1 | — | | 48 | 5 |
| Slovan Bratislava | 2025–26 | Slovak First Football League | 26 | 7 | 2 | 0 | 10 (Note: Three appearances in UEFA Champions League, one appearance in UEFA Europa League, six appearances and one goal in UEFA Conference League) | 1 | — | | 38 | 8 |
| Slovan Bratislava | 2026–27 | Slovak First Football League | 10 | 0 | 1 | 0 | 5 | 0 | — | | 16 | 0 |
| Slovan Bratislava | Total | | 91 | 20 | 9 | 1 | 38 | 2 | 0 | 0 | 138 | 23 |
| Career total | | | 108 | 23 | 9 | 1 | 38 | 2 | 0 | 0 | 155 | 26 |

=== International ===
As of match played 16 November 2026

Appearances and goals by national team and year
| National team | Year | Apps | Goals |
|---|---|---|---|
| Slovakia | 2026 | 2 | 0 |
| Total | | 2 | 0 |
