= Alasana Yirajang =

Gambian footballer (born 2004)

Personal information
- Full name: Alasana Yirajang
- Date of birth: 12 November 2004 (age 22)
- Place of birth: Kartung, The Gambia
- Height: 1.84 m (6 ft 0 in)
- Position: Centre-forward

Team information
- Current team: Slovan Bratislava
- Number: 14

Youth career
- Real de Banjul

Senior career*
Years	Team	Apps	(Gls)
–2023	Real de Banjul		
2024–2025	Podbrezová	37	(8)
2025–	Slovan Bratislava	25	(1)
- * Club domestic league appearances and goals as of 19 September 2026 (UTC)

Alasana Yirajang (born 12 November 2004) is a Gambian professional footballer who plays as a centre-forward for Niké Liga club ŠK Slovan Bratislava .

== Club career ==
Yirajang made his professional Niké Liga debut for Podbrezová against MŠK Žilina on 20 April 2024.

== Career statistics ==
=== Club ===
As of match played 20 October 2026

Appearances and goals by club, season and competition
Club	Season	League			Cup		Europe		Other		Total	
Club	Season	Division	Apps	Goals	Apps	Goals	Apps	Goals	Apps	Goals	Apps	Goals
Podbrezová	2023–24	Slovak First Football League	6	0	0	0	—		—		6	0
Podbrezová	2024–25	Slovak First Football League	31	8	4	2	—		2 (Note: Appearances in Conference League Playoff)	1	37	11
Podbrezová	Total		37	8	4	2	—		2	1	43	11
Slovan Bratislava	2025–26	Slovak First Football League	18	0	3	3	10 (Note: Two appearances in UEFA Champions League, two appearances in UEFA Europa League, six appearances in UEFA Conference League)	0	—		31	3
Slovan Bratislava	2026–27	Slovak First Football League	7	1	2	0	7 (Note: Appearances in UEFA Champions League)	2	—		16	4
Slovan Bratislava	Total		25	1	5	3	17	2	—		47	7
Career total			63	9	9	5	17	2	2	1	91	17
