= Sebastjan Spahiu =

Albanian footballer (born 1999)

Personal information
- Full name: Sebastjan Spahiu
- Date of birth: 30 October 1999 (age 27)
- Place of birth: Mouscron, Belgium
- Height: 1.75 m (5 ft 9 in)
- Position: Midfielder

Team information
- Current team: Partizani
- Number: 70

Youth career
- 2007–2013: Brussels
- 2013–2017: Lierse

Senior career*
Years	Team	Apps	(Gls)
2017–2020	Mouscron	12	(1)
2020–2021	Guijuelo	3	(0)
2021	→ Izarra (loan)	5	(0)
2022–2023	Laçi	49	(2)
2023–2024	Egnatia	33	(4)
2024–2025	Mes Rafsanjan	18	(0)
2025–2026	Shkëndija	19	(2)
2026–	Partizani	0	(0)

International career^{‡}
2018	Albania U21	1	(0)
2024–	Albania	1	(0)
- * Club domestic league appearances and goals as of 26 May 2026 ‡ National team caps and goals as of 10 September 2024

Sebastjan Spahiu (born 30 October 1999) is a professional footballer who plays for Albanian club Partizani . Born in Belgium, he represents Albania internationally, making his senior international debut in 2024.

== Early life ==
Spahiu was born in Belgium to parents from Shkodër, Albania.

== Club career ==
Spahiu scored his first goal in the Belgian First Division A on 18 May 2018, against OH Leuven. Spahiu left Royal Excel Mouscron on 14 January 2020, where his contract was terminated.

He remained without club until 5 August 2020, where he joined Spanish Segunda División B for CD Guijuelo. After only 14 minutes of playing time at Guijuelo, Spahiu was loaned out to CD Izarra for the rest of the season, on 27 January 2021.

He joined Albanian side Laçi of the Albanian top division, Kategoria Superiore in January 2022. After a short spell with fellow top division club FK Egnatia in the Albanian league he left the club on a free transfer in July 2024.

He joined Iranian club Mes Rafsanjan F.C. in August 2024, agreeing to a one-year contract. He made his debut in the Persian Gulf Pro League in a 0–0 draw against Gol Gohar Sirjan F.C. on 20 September 2024.

== International career ==
On 6 June 2018, Spahiu debuted for the Albania U21s against Belarus U21.

Spahiu was called up to the Albania national team foe the first time in September 2024. He subsequently made his debut for the senior national team on 10 September 2024 in a Nations League game against Georgia at the Arena Kombëtare. He featured in the game as a substitute for Jasir Asani in the 73rd minute, Georgia won 1–0.

== Honours ==
Egnatia

- Albanian Cup: 2023–24
