= Clinton Antwi =

Ghanaian footballer

Personal information
- Date of birth: 6 November 1999 (age 27)
- Place of birth: Tamale, Ghana
- Height: 1.69 m (5 ft 7 in)
- Position: Left-back

Team information
- Current team: KuPS
- Number: 25

Youth career
- –2018: Right to Dream
- 2018–2019: Nordsjælland

Senior career*
| Years | Team | Apps | (Gls) |
| 2018–2022 | Nordsjælland | 19 | (0) |
| 2020–2021 | → Esbjerg fB (loan) | 22 | (0) |
| 2022– | KuPS | 118 | (5) |
- * Club domestic league appearances and goals as of 12 November 2026

Clinton Antwi (born 6 November 1999) is a Ghanaian professional footballer who plays as a defender for Veikkausliiga club KuPS.

== Career ==
=== Nordsjælland ===
Antwi played for the Right to Dream Academy before joining FC Nordsjælland in January 2018. He spent his first half season in spring 2018 in the U19 team in the U19 league. In the summer of 2018 he trained with the club's first team.

On 18 July 2018, Antwi made his debut in the UEFA Europa League starting in a 2–1 home victory against Cliftonville. He conceded a sixth-minute penalty.

Antwi got his debut in the Superliga for FC Nordjælland on 22 July 2018, when he was substituted 37 minutes into the game for an injured Mads Mini Pedersen in a 1–1 draw against AGF.

On 23 September 2020, Antwi joined Danish 1st Division club Esbjerg fB on loan for the rest of the season.

=== KuPS ===
On 7 January 2022, Antwi signed a two-year deal with Finnish club Kuopion Palloseura (KuPS) for an undisclosed fee. On 8 August 2023, Antwi extended his contract until the end of 2024, plus an option for the 2025. He won the Finnish Cup title with KuPS twice, in 2022 and 2024. On 11 October 2024, his contract option for 2025 was exercised. In late October, Antwi won the Finnish Championship title with KuPS.

== Outside football ==
While living in Denmark and Finland, Antwi's interest for environmental protection and recycling has increased. He has visited schools and NGO's in Ghana to raise awareness and know-how of the importance of recycling.

== Career statistics ==
As of 12 November 2026

Appearances and goals by club, season and competition
| Club | Season | Division | League | | Cup (Note: Includes Danish Cup and Suomen Cup) | | League cup (Note: Appearance(s) in Finnish League Cup) | | Europe | | Total | |
| Club | Season | Division | Apps | Goals | Apps | Goals | Apps | Goals | Apps | Goals | Apps | Goals |
|---|---|---|---|---|---|---|---|---|---|---|---|---|
| Nordsjælland | 2018–19 | Danish Superliga | 3 | 0 | 0 | 0 | — | | 1 (Note: Appearance(s) in UEFA Europa League) | 0 | 4 | 0 |
| Nordsjælland | 2019–20 | Danish Superliga | 16 | 0 | 2 | 1 | — | | — | | 18 | 1 |
| Nordsjælland | Total | | 19 | 0 | 2 | 1 | 0 | 0 | 1 | 0 | 22 | 1 |
| Esbjerg fB (loan) | 2020–21 | Danish 1st Division | 22 | 0 | 2 | 0 | — | | — | | 24 | 0 |
| KuPS | 2022 | Veikkausliiga | 18 | 3 | 3 | 0 | 4 | 0 | 4 (Note: Appearance(s) in UEFA Europa Conference League) | 0 | 29 | 3 |
| KuPS | 2023 | Veikkausliiga | 26 | 1 | 3 | 0 | 4 | 0 | 1 | 0 | 34 | 1 |
| KuPS | 2024 | Veikkausliiga | 27 | 1 | 4 | 1 | 7 | 1 | 4 | 0 | 42 | 3 |
| KuPS | 2025 | Veikkausliiga | 18 | 0 | 2 | 0 | 5 | 0 | 9 (Note: Two appearances in UEFA Champions League and seven appearances in UEFA Conference League) | 1 | 34 | 1 |
| KuPS | 2026 | Veikkausliiga | 29 | 0 | 3 | 0 | 2 | 0 | 8 (Note: Four appearances in UEFA Champions League, two appearances in UEFA Europa League and two appearances in UEFA Conference League) | 0 | 42 | 0 |
| KuPS | Total | | 118 | 5 | 15 | 1 | 22 | 1 | 26 | 0 | 181 | 7 |
| Career total | | | 159 | 5 | 19 | 2 | 22 | 1 | 27 | 1 | 227 | 9 |

== Honours ==
KuPS

- Veikkausliiga: 2024
- Veikkausliiga runner-up: 2022, 2023
- Finnish Cup: 2022, 2024
- Finnish League Cup runner-up: 2024

Individual

- Veikkausliiga Team of the Year: 2024
