= 2024–25 ŠK Slovan Bratislava season =

ŠK Slovan Bratislava
2024–25 season
- Manager: Vladimír Weiss
- Stadium: Tehelné pole
- Slovak 1st League: 1st
- Slovak Cup: Semi-finals
- UEFA Champions League: 35th in League phase
- Top goalscorer: League: Tigran Barseghyan; David Strelec (20 each); All: David Strelec (25)
- Highest home attendance: 22,500 v Manchester City (1 Oct 2024, UEFA Champions League) v Milan (26 Nov 2024, UEFA Champions League) v VfB Stuttgart (21 Jan 2025, UEFA Champions League)
- Lowest home attendance: 2,760 v Trenčín (4 Feb 2025, Slovak Cup)
- Biggest win: 6–0 v Komárno (4 Dec 2024, Slovak 1st League)
- Biggest defeat: 0–5 v Žilina (1 Sep 2024, Slovak 1st League)
Home colours	Away colours	Third colours
- All statistics correct as of 18 May 2025.

The 2024–25 season is the 106th season in the history of ŠK Slovan Bratislava, and the club's 19th consecutive season in Slovak First Football League. In addition to the domestic league, the team is scheduled to participate in the Slovak Cup and the UEFA Champions League after winning the Slovak League title for the sixth time in a row.

== Players ==
As of 17 May 2025

Squad No.	Name	Nationality	Position(s)	Date of birth (age)	Signed from / Previous club	Since
Goalkeepers
30	Andrej Mikoláš	(Slovakia)	GK	11 August 2004 (age 22)	Youth system	2024
31	Martin Trnovský	(Slovakia)	GK	7 June 2000 (age 26)	Youth system	2019
44	Matúš Macík	(Slovakia)	GK	19 May 1993 (age 33)	(Czech Republic) Sigma Olomouc	2025
71	Dominik Takáč	(Slovakia)	GK	12 January 1999 (age 27)	(Slovakia) Spartak Trnava	2024
Defenders
2	Siemen Voet	(Belgium)	CB	3 February 2000 (age 26)	(Netherlands) PEC Zwolle	2022
4	Guram Kashia	(Georgia (country))	CB	4 July 1987 (age 39)	(Georgia (country)) Locomotive Tbilisi	2021
6	Kevin Wimmer	(Austria)	CB / LB	15 November 1992 (age 33)	(Austria) Rapid Wien	2023
12	Kenan Bajrić	(Slovenia)	CB / DM	20 December 1994 (age 31)	(Slovenia) Olimpija Ljubljana	2018
17	Jurij Medveděv	(Czech Republic) (Kazakhstan)	RB	18 June 1996 (age 30)	(Russia) Sochi	2024
23	Sharani Zuberu	(Ghana)	LB / LW / RW / ST	7 January 2000 (age 26)	(Ghana) Dreams	2023
25	Lukáš Pauschek	(Slovakia)	RB	9 December 1992 (age 33)	(Czech Republic) Mladá Boleslav	2019
27	Matúš Vojtko	(Slovakia)	LB	5 October 2000 (age 26)	(Slovakia) Zemplín Michalovce	2021
28	César Blackman	(Panama)	RB / RW	2 April 1998 (age 28)	(Slovakia) DAC Dunajská Streda	2023
Midfielders
5	Rahim Ibrahim	(Ghana)	CM	10 June 2001 (age 25)	(Slovakia) Trenčín	2025
7	Vladimír Weiss Jr. (captain)	(Slovakia)	LW / RW / CAM	30 November 1989 (age 36)	(Qatar) Al-Gharafa	2020
10	Marko Tolić	(Croatia)	CAM / CM	5 July 1996 (age 30)	(Croatia) Dinamo Zagreb	2023
11	Tigran Barseghyan	(Armenia)	RW / LW	22 September 1993 (age 33)	(Kazakhstan) Astana	2022
16	Maxim Mateáš	(Slovakia)	CM	12 May 2008 (age 18)	Youth system	2024
18	Nino Marcelli	(Slovakia)	LW / RW	29 May 2005 (age 21)	Youth system	2023
20	Alen Mustafić	(Bosnia and Herzegovina)	CM	5 July 1999 (age 27)	(Denmark) OB	2024
33	Juraj Kucka	(Slovakia)	DM / CM	26 February 1987 (age 39)	(Italy) Parma	2022
37	Július Szöke	(Slovakia)	DM / CM	1 August 1995 (age 31)	(Cyprus) Aris Limassol	2024
77	Danylo Ihnatenko	(Ukraine)	CM / DM / CB	13 March 1997 (age 29)	(France) Bordeaux	2024
88	Kyriakos Savvidis	(Greece)	DM / CM	20 June 1995 (age 31)	(Slovakia) Spartak Trnava	2023
—	Artur Gajdoš (out on loan at (Slovakia) Trenčín)	(Slovakia)	CAM	20 January 2004 (age 22)	(Slovakia) Trenčín	2024
—	Filip Lichý (out on loan at (Czech Republic) Dukla Prague)	(Slovakia)	CM / DM / CB	25 January 2001 (age 25)	Youth system	2020
Forwards
13	David Strelec	(Slovakia)	ST	4 April 2001 (age 25)	(Italy) Spezia	2023
21	Róbert Mak	(Slovakia)	LW / RW / ST	8 March 1991 (age 35)	(Australia) Sydney FC	2024
93	Idjessi Metsoko	(Togo)	ST	14 March 2002 (age 24)	(Czech Republic) Viktoria Plzeň (loan)	2024
—	Adler Da Silva	(Switzerland) (Brazil)	ST / CAM	28 December 1998 (age 27)	(Slovakia) Pohronie	2022

== Transfers and loans ==
=== Transfers in ===
Date	Position	Nationality	Name	From / Previous club	Fee	Ref.
17 May 2024	FW	(Slovakia)	David Strelec	(Italy) Spezia Calcio	€1,200,000	
17 May 2024	MF	(Croatia)	Marko Tolić	(Croatia) Dinamo Zagreb	Undisclosed	
11 June 2024	FW	(Slovakia)	Róbert Mak	(Australia) Sydney FC	Free transfer	
13 June 2024	DF	(Czech Republic)	Jurij Medveděv	(Russia) Sochi	Free transfer	
13 June 2024	MF	(Slovakia)	Július Szöke	(Cyprus) Aris Limassol	€500,000	
30 June 2024	FW	(Switzerland)	Adler Da Silva	(Poland) Stal Rzeszów	Loan return	
30 June 2024	FW	(Serbia)	Ivan Šaponjić	(Turkey) Ümraniyespor	Loan return	
30 June 2024	DF	(Belgium)	Siemen Voet	(Netherlands) Fortuna Sittard	Loan return	
13 July 2024	GK	(Slovakia)	Dominik Takáč	(Slovakia) Spartak Trnava	Free transfer	
22 July 2024	MF	(Bosnia and Herzegovina)	Alen Mustafić	(Denmark) OB	Undisclosed	
3 September 2024	MF	(Slovakia)	Artur Gajdoš	(Slovakia) Trenčín	Undisclosed	
3 September 2024	MF	(Ukraine)	Danylo Ihnatenko	(France) Bordeaux	Free transfer	
28 January 2025	GK	(Slovakia)	Matúš Macík	(Czech Republic) Sigma Olomouc	Free transfer	
15 February 2025	MF	(Ghana)	Rahim Ibrahim	(Slovakia) Trenčín	Undisclosed	

=== Loans in ===
Start date	Position	Nationality	Name	From	End date	Ref.
20 August 2024	FW	(Togo)	Idjessi Metsoko	(Czech Republic) Viktoria Plzeň	30 June 2025	

=== Transfers out ===
Date	Position	Nationality	Name	To / Next club	Fee	Ref.
30 June 2024	GK	(Canada)	Milan Borjan	(Serbia) Red Star Belgrade	Loan return	
1 July 2024	MF	(Georgia (country))	Jaba Kankava	End of contract		
1 July 2024	DF	(Slovakia)	Richard Križan	End of contract		
15 August 2024	DF	(Slovakia)	Richard Križan	(Czech Republic) České Budějovice	Free transfer	
1 July 2024	DF	(Greece)	Spyros Risvanis	End of contract		
1 July 2024	MF	(Czech Republic)	Jaromír Zmrhal	End of contract		
4 July 2024	MF	(Czech Republic)	Jaromír Zmrhal	(Cyprus) Apollon Limassol	Free transfer	
31 December 2024	FW	(Serbia)	Ivan Šaponjić	(Hungary) Fehérvár	End of contract	
1 January 2025	FW	(Serbia)	Aleksandar Čavrić	(Japan) Kashima Antlers	Undisclosed	
24 January 2025	GK	(Slovakia)	Adam Hrdina	(Czech Republic) Zbrojovka Brno	Undisclosed	
24 February 2025	FW	(Nigeria)	Elvis Isaac	(Czech Republic) České Budějovice	Free transfer	

=== Loans out ===
Start date	Position	Nationality	Name	To	End date	Ref.
23 July 2024	MF	(Slovakia)	Filip Lichý	(Czech Republic) Dukla Prague	30 June 2025	
15 February 2025	MF	(Slovakia)	Artur Gajdoš	(Slovakia) Trenčín	30 June 2025	

== Friendlies ==
Win Draw Loss

=== Pre-season ===
Sun, 23 June 2024 Friendly	Ludogorets Razgrad (Bulgaria)	1–0	(Slovakia) Slovan Bratislava	Straßwalchen, Austria
18:00 CEST (UTC+02:00)	Chochev 59'	Report		Stadium: Straßwalchen Nevoga-Arena

Wed, 26 June 2024 Friendly	FC Blau-Weiß Linz (Austria)	1–5	(Slovakia) Slovan Bratislava	Austria
16:00 CEST (UTC+02:00)	Ronivaldo 67'	Report	Szöke 37'; Barseghyan 54', 75'; Lichý 60'; Tolić 85'

Sat, 29 June 2024 Friendly	CFR Cluj (Romania)	1–0	(Slovakia) Slovan Bratislava	Windischgarsten, Austria
18:00 CEST (UTC+02:00)	Păun 88' (pen.)	Report		Stadium: Sportplatz Windischgarsten

Wed, 3 July 2024 Friendly	Slovan Bratislava (Slovakia)	1–0	(Slovakia) Petržalka	Bratislava
19:00 CEST (UTC+02:00)	Mak 67'	Report		Stadium: Tehelné pole Attendance: 2,286

=== Mid-season ===
Tue, 14 January 2025 Friendly	Al Shahaniya (Qatar)	1–3	(Slovakia) Slovan Bratislava	Doha, Qatar
15:00 CEST (UTC+02:00)	van Amersfoort 46'	Report	Mak 7'; Strelec 35'; Kashia 87'

Thu, 16 January 2025 Friendly	Al-Gharafa (Qatar)	1–2	(Slovakia) Slovan Bratislava	Doha, Qatar
16:00 CEST (UTC+02:00)	Surag 45'	Report	Bajrić 33'; Szöke 84'

== Competition overview ==
Competition	First match	Last match	Starting round	Final position	Record							
Competition	First match	Last match	Starting round	Final position	Pld	W	D	L	GF	GA	GD	Win %
Slovak First Football League	27 July 2024	17 May 2025	Matchday 1	1st	32	22	6	4	74	39	+35	68.75
Slovak Cup	10 September 2024	15 April 2025	Second round	Semi-finals	7	6	0	1	20	5	+15	85.71
UEFA Champions League	10 July 2024	29 January 2025	First qualifying round	League phase	16	5	3	8	25	34	−9	31.25
Total					55	33	9	13	119	78	+41	60.00

Last updated: 18 May 2025
Source: Competitions

== Slovak First Football League ==
=== League table ===
==== Regular stage ====
Pos	Team	Pld	W	D	L	GF	GA	GD	Pts	Qualification
1	Slovan Bratislava	22	15	4	3	48	25	+23	49	Qualification for the championship group
2	Žilina	22	13	6	3	42	20	+22	45	Qualification for the championship group
3	Spartak Trnava	22	12	8	2	34	17	+17	44	Qualification for the championship group
4	DAC Dunajská Streda	22	8	8	6	32	22	+10	32	Qualification for the championship group
5	Podbrezová	22	7	9	6	31	29	+2	30	Qualification for the championship group
6	Košice	22	7	8	7	31	25	+6	29	Qualification for the championship group

Source: Niké liga (in Slovak)
Rules for classification: 1) Points; 2) Head-to-head points; 3) Head-to-head goal difference; 4) Head-to-head away goals scored; 5) Play-off.

==== Championship group ====
Pos	Team	Pld	W	D	L	GF	GA	GD	Pts	Qualification	SLO	ŽIL	TRN	DAC	KOŠ	POD
1	Slovan Bratislava (C, Q)	32	22	6	4	74	39	+35	72	Qualification for the Champions League second qualifying round (Note: Since already qualified Paris Saint-Germain won the Champions League, Slovan Bratislava was promoted to the Champions League second qualifying round as one of the two champions with the highest coefficient in Champions League qualifying.)	—	4–3	1–1	2–2	1–0	3–1
2	Žilina (Q)	32	15	9	8	55	40	+15	54	Qualification for the Conference League second qualifying round	0–5	—	2–1	0–1	0–0	0–0
3	Spartak Trnava (Q)	32	14	10	8	46	34	+12	52	Qualification for the Europa League first qualifying round	2–3	2–4	—	1–1	0–1	2–1
4	DAC Dunajská Streda (O)	32	13	12	7	48	34	+14	51	Qualification for the Conference League play-offs	2–1	3–1	1–0	—	3–2	1–1
5	Košice	32	11	11	10	45	38	+7	44	Qualification for the Conference League play-offs	2–3	3–2	2–1	2–2	—	1–1
6	Železiarne Podbrezová	32	8	13	11	40	43	−3	37	Qualification for the Conference League play-offs	1–3	1–1	1–2	2–0	0–1	—

Source: Niké liga (in Slovak)
Legend: Blue = home team win; Yellow = draw; Red = away team win.
Rules for classification: 1) Points; 2) Head-to-head points; 3) Head-to-head goal difference; 4) Head-to-head away goals scored; 5) Play-off.
(C) Champions; (O) Play-off winners; (Q) Qualified for the phase indicated

=== Results summary ===
Overall								Home						Away					
Pld	W	D	L	GF	GA	GD	Pts	W	D	L	GF	GA	GD	W	D	L	GF	GA	GD
32	22	6	4	74	39	+35	72	10	4	2	32	20	+12	12	2	2	42	19	+23

Last updated: 17 May 2025.

=== Results by round ===
Round	1	2	4	5	6	7	8	9	10	11	3	13	14	15	16	12	17	18	19	20	21	22	23	24	25	26	27	28	29	30	31	32
Ground	A	H	H	A	H	A	H	A	H	A	A	A	H	A	H	H	A	H	A	H	A	H	A	H	H	A	H	A	A	H	A	H
Result	W	W	W	W	L	W	W	W	D	W	W	W	W	D	W	W	L	W	W	D	D	L	W	D	W	W	D	W	L	W	W	W
Position	1	1	1	1	1	1	1	1	2	2	2	1	1	1	1	1	1	1	1	1	1	1	1	1	1	1	1	1	1	1	1	1
Points	3	6	9	12	12	15	18	21	22	25	28	31	34	35	38	41	41	44	47	48	49	49	52	53	56	59	60	63	63	66	69	72

Updated to match(es) played on 17 May 2025. Source:
A = Away; H = Home; W = Win; D = Draw; L = Loss

=== Matches ===
Regular stage

Sat, 27 July 2024 1	Komárno	1–4	Slovan Bratislava	Zlaté Moravce
20:30 CEST (UTC+02:00)	Sylvestr 19'	Report (Slovan); Report (Niké liga)	Barseghyan 5' (pen.); Marcelli 43'; Mak 80'; Strelec 90+2'	Stadium: ViOn Aréna; Attendance: 1,915; Referee: Erik Gemzický

Sat, 3 August 2024 2	Slovan Bratislava	1–0	Podbrezová	Bratislava
20:30 CEST (UTC+02:00)	Barseghyan 77' (pen.)	Report (Slovan); Report (Niké liga)		Stadium: Tehelné pole Attendance: 5,338; Referee: Lukáš Dzivjak

Sat, 17 August 2024 4	Slovan Bratislava	2–1	Košice	Bratislava
18:00 CEST (UTC+02:00)	Strelec 52'; Barseghyan 90+1'	Report (Slovan); Report (Niké liga)	Medved 15' (pen.)	Stadium: Tehelné pole Attendance: 5,298; Referee: Boris Marhefka

Sun, 25 August 2024 5	Dukla Banská Bystrica	0–2	Slovan Bratislava	Banská Bystrica
18:00 CEST (UTC+02:00)		Report (Slovan); Report (Niké liga)	Metsoko 66'; Barseghyan 74'	Stadium: Štadión SNP; Attendance: 4,125; Referee: Kristián Micheľ

Sun, 1 September 2024 6	Slovan Bratislava	0–5	Žilina	Bratislava
15:30 CEST (UTC+02:00)		Report (Slovan); Report (Niké liga)	Kaprálik 32'; Hranica 41'; Ďuriš 58'; Sauer 82', 90'	Stadium: Tehelné pole Attendance: 8,119; Referee: Peter Kráľovič

Sat, 14 September 2024 7	DAC Dunajská Streda	1–2	Slovan Bratislava	Dunajská Streda
20:30 CEST (UTC+02:00)	Kashia 48' (o.g.); Trusa (penalty missed) 90+10'	Report (Slovan); Report (Niké liga)	Barseghyan 56', 89' (pen.)	Stadium: MOL Aréna; Attendance: 6,080; Referee: Martin Dohál

Sat, 21 September 2024 8	Slovan Bratislava	2–1	Ružomberok	Bratislava
20:30 CEST (UTC+02:00)	Mak 11'; Barseghyan (penalty missed) 48'; Gabriel 63' (o.g.)	Report (Slovan); Report (Niké liga)	Chrien (penalty missed) 43', 43'	Stadium: Tehelné pole Attendance: 6,077; Referee: Filip Glova

Fri, 27 September 2024 9	Zemplín Michalovce	2–4	Slovan Bratislava	Michalovce
20:00 CEST (UTC+02:00)	Acosta 20'; Bednár (red card) 71'; Pačinda 90+1'	Report (Slovan); Report (Niké liga)	Barseghyan 45+4'; Strelec 64', 78'; Zuberu 89'	Stadium: Mestský futbalový štadión Attendance: 3,089; Referee: Erik Gemzický

Sat, 5 October 2024 10	Slovan Bratislava	1–1	Trenčín	Bratislava
20:30 CEST (UTC+02:00)	Stojsavljević 50' (o.g.)	Report (Slovan); Report (Niké liga)	Emeka 45'; Galád (red card) 82' (off the pitch); Sláviček (yellow card) 79' (yellow-red card) 90+6' (second (yellow card) off the pitch)	Stadium: Tehelné pole Attendance: 6,150; Referee: Lukáš Dzivjak

Sat, 19 October 2024 11	Spartak Trnava	0–1	Slovan Bratislava	Trnava
18:00 CEST (UTC+02:00)		Report (Slovan); Report (Niké liga)	Barseghyan 69'	Stadium: Štadión Antona Malatinského; Attendance: 13,583; Referee: Erik Gemzický

Wed, 30 October 2024 3	Skalica	2–3	Slovan Bratislava	Skalica
16:00 CET (UTC+01:00)	Yao 35'; Nagy 90+3'	Report (Slovan); Report (Niké liga)	Strelec 4', 45+3'; Barseghyan 60'	Stadium: Štadión MFK Skalica; Attendance: 2,367; Referee: Bálint Kišš

Sat, 2 November 2024 13	Podbrezová	1–3	Slovan Bratislava	Podbrezová
18:00 CET (UTC+01:00)	Yirajang 51'	Report (Slovan); Report (Niké liga)	Marcelli 67'; Kashia 76'; Barseghyan 83'	Stadium: ZELPO Aréna; Attendance: 3,687; Referee: Peter Kráľovič

Sat, 9 November 2024 14	Slovan Bratislava	3–1	Skalica	Bratislava
15:30 CET (UTC+01:00)	Strelec 14', 45'; Kopas 41' (o.g.)	Report (Slovan); Report (Niké liga)	Yao 50'	Stadium: Tehelné pole Attendance: 5,532; Referee: Erik Gemzický

Fri, 22 November 2024 15	Košice	1–1	Slovan Bratislava	Košice
18:00 CET (UTC+01:00)	Medved 59' (pen.)	Report (Slovan); Report (Niké liga)	Barseghyan 73'	Stadium: Košická futbalová aréna Attendance: 7,298; Referee: Lukáš Dzivjak

Sun, 1 December 2024 16	Slovan Bratislava	3–1	Dukla Banská Bystrica	Bratislava
15:30 CET (UTC+01:00)	Barseghyan 48'; Mak 56', 76'	Report (Slovan); Report (Niké liga)	Rymarenko 3'	Stadium: Tehelné pole Attendance: 4,620; Referee: Peter Ziemba

Wed, 4 December 2024 12	Slovan Bratislava	6–0	Komárno	Bratislava
18:00 CET (UTC+01:00)	Barseghyan 7', 27'; Ihnatenko 34'; Strelec 37'; Tolić 84'; Medveděv (yellow card) 86' (yellow-red card) 90+2'; Marcelli 90+4'	Report (Slovan); Report (Niké liga)		Stadium: Tehelné pole Attendance: 3,058; Referee: Lukáš Dzivjak

Sat, 7 December 2024 17	Žilina	2–1	Slovan Bratislava	Žilina
18:00 CET (UTC+01:00)	Bile 47'; Bari 90+5'	Report (Slovan); Report (Niké liga)	Blackman 55'	Stadium: Štadión pod Dubňom; Attendance: 5,732; Referee: Filip Glova

Sat, 14 December 2024 18	Slovan Bratislava	2–1	DAC Dunajská Streda	Bratislava
18:00 CET (UTC+01:00)	Strelec 57'; Kashia 69'	Report (Slovan); Report (Niké liga)	Tuboly 65'	Stadium: Tehelné pole Attendance: 6,694; Referee: Boris Marhefka

Sun, 9 February 2025 19	Ružomberok	1–5	Slovan Bratislava	Ružomberok
15:30 CET (UTC+01:00)	Madleňák 44'	Report (Slovan); Report (Niké liga)	Mak 21', 32', 71'; Strelec 48'; Barseghyan 84'	Stadium: Štadión pod Čebraťom; Attendance: 2,721; Referee: Peter Kráľovič

Sat, 15 February 2025 20	Slovan Bratislava	1–1	Zemplín Michalovce	Bratislava
16:00 CET (UTC+01:00)	Strelec 50'	Report (Slovan); Report (Niké liga)	Ramos 69'	Stadium: Tehelné pole Attendance: 4,274; Referee: Martin Dohál

Sat, 22 February 2025 21	Trenčín	1–1	Slovan Bratislava	Trenčín
15:30 CET (UTC+01:00)	Bariš 74'	Report (Slovan); Report (Niké liga)	Ihnatenko 83'	Stadium: Štadión Sihoť; Attendance: 2,697; Referee: Kristián Micheľ

Sat, 1 March 2025 22	Slovan Bratislava	0–1	Spartak Trnava	Bratislava
15:30 CET (UTC+01:00)		Report (Slovan); Report (Niké liga)	Azango 12'	Stadium: Tehelné pole Attendance: 12,894; Referee: Bálint Kišš

Championship group

Sun, 9 March 2025 23 / Championship group round 1	Košice	2–3	Slovan Bratislava	Košice
15:30 CET (UTC+01:00)	Kenzhebek 32'; Miljanić 57'	Report (Slovan); Report (Niké liga)	Barseghyan 44' (pen.), 52' (pen.); Bajrić 45+4'	Stadium: Košická futbalová aréna Attendance: 6,899; Referee: Peter Kráľovič

Sun, 16 March 2025 24 / 2	Slovan Bratislava	1–1	Spartak Trnava	Bratislava
15:30 CET (UTC+01:00)	Weiss Jr. (yellow card) 38' (yellow-red card) 45+1'; Bajrić 90+8'	Report (Slovan); Report (Niké liga)	Zeljković 45+6'; Badolo (yellow card) 88' (yellow-red card) 90+5'	Stadium: Tehelné pole Attendance: 11,644; Referee: Peter Ziemba

Sat, 29 March 2025 25 / 3	Slovan Bratislava	3–1	Podbrezová	Bratislava
15:30 CET (UTC+01:00)	Mak 59', 90+2'; Marković 85' (o.g.)	Report (Slovan); Report (Niké liga)	Štefánik 82'	Stadium: Tehelné pole Attendance: 4,274; Referee: Peter Kráľovič

Sat, 5 April 2025 26 / 4	Žilina	0–5	Slovan Bratislava	Žilina
18:00 CEST (UTC+02:00)		Report (Slovan); Report (Niké liga)	Barseghyan 11', 49'; Narimanidze 13' (o.g.); Strelec 72', 84'	Stadium: Štadión pod Dubňom; Attendance: 3,678; Referee: Boris Marhefka

Sat, 12 April 2025 27 / 5	Slovan Bratislava	2–2	DAC Dunajská Streda	Bratislava
18:00 CEST (UTC+02:00)	Zuberu 77'; Barseghyan 84'	Report (Slovan); Report (Niké liga)	Blaško 55'; Đukanović 62' (pen.)	Stadium: Tehelné pole Attendance: 8,911; Referee: Bálint Kišš

Sat, 19 April 2025 28 / 6	Spartak Trnava	2–3	Slovan Bratislava	Trnava
20:30 CEST (UTC+02:00)	Kratochvíl 8'; Jureškin 65'	Report (Slovan); Report (Niké liga)	Tolić 31' (pen.); Ibrahim 45'; Strelec 60'	Stadium: Štadión Antona Malatinského; Attendance: 7,537; Referee: Lukáš Dzivjak

Sat, 26 April 2025 29 / 7	DAC Dunajská Streda	2–1	Slovan Bratislava	Dunajská Streda
20:30 CEST (UTC+02:00)	Ramadan 2'; Redzic 86'	Report (Slovan); Report (Niké liga)	Kashia (red card) 43'; Ihnatenko 76'	Stadium: MOL Aréna; Attendance: 7,420; Referee: Ivan Kružliak

Sat, 3 May 2025 30 / 8	Slovan Bratislava	4–3	Žilina	Bratislava
20:30 CEST (UTC+02:00)		Report (Slovan); Report (Niké liga)		Stadium: Tehelné pole Attendance: 10,730; Referee: Lukáš Dzivjak

Sat, 10 May 2025 31 / 9	Podbrezová	1–3	Slovan Bratislava	Podbrezová
18:00 CEST (UTC+02:00)		Report (Slovan); Report (Niké liga)		Stadium: ZELPO Aréna; Attendance: 2,017; Referee: Michal Očenáš

Sat, 17 May 2025 32 / 10	Slovan Bratislava	1–0	Košice	Bratislava
17:00 CEST (UTC+02:00)		Report (Slovan); Report (Niké liga)		Stadium: Tehelné pole Attendance: 14,125; Referee: Peter Ziemba

== Slovak Cup ==
Tue, 10 September 2024 Second round	AC Nitra (6)	0–5	Slovan Bratislava (1)	Nitra
18:00 CEST (UTC+02:00)		Report	Metsoko 9'; Medveděv 25'; Mak 27'; Isaac 74', 89'	Stadium: Štadión pod Zoborom; Attendance: 5,213

Tue, 24 September 2024 Third round	Beluša (3)	1–6	Slovan Bratislava (1)	Beluša
15:30 CEST (UTC+02:00)	Knižka 88'	Report	Tolić 44'; Ihnatenko 47'; Metsoko 49'; Kashia 59'; Gajdoš 72'; Zuberu 81'	Stadium: Štadión TJ Kovo Beluša; Attendance: 1,452

Sat, 26 October 2024 Fourth round	Spišská Nová Ves (3)	0–2	Slovan Bratislava (1)	Spišská Nová Ves
13:30 CEST (UTC+02:00)		Report	Isaac 6'; Vojtko 88'	Stadium: Mestský štadión Spišská N. Ves; Attendance: 2,137

Tue, 4 February 2025 Round of 16	Slovan Bratislava (1)	3–1	Trenčín (1)	Bratislava
18:00 CET (UTC+01:00)	Tolić 43', 79'; Marcelli 63'	Report	Vojtko 52' (o.g.)	Stadium: Tehelné pole Attendance: 2,760

Wed, 12 March 2025 Quarter-finals	Košice (1)	0–1	Slovan Bratislava (1)	Košice
18:00 CET (UTC+01:00)		Report	Barseghyan 38'; Ihnatenko (yellow card) 31' (yellow-red card) 57'	Stadium: Košická futbalová aréna Attendance: 6,872

Wed, 2 April 2025 Semi-finals, 1st leg	Slovan Bratislava (1)	2–1	Spartak Trnava (1)	Bratislava
18:00 CEST (UTC+02:00)	Mak 31'; Vojtko 41'	Report	Ofori 12'	Stadium: Tehelné pole Attendance: 7,816

Tue, 15 April 2025 Semi-finals, 2nd leg	Spartak Trnava (1)	2–1 (a.e.t.) (3–3 agg.) (4–2 p)	Slovan Bratislava (1)	Trnava
18:00 CEST (UTC+02:00)	Kashia 35' (o.g.); Ďuriš 90'	Report	Kashia 39'	Stadium: Štadión Antona Malatinského; Attendance: 10,132
	Penalties
	Jureškin (penalty scored); Procházka (penalty scored); Zeljković (penalty scored); Badolo (penalty missed); Sabo (penalty scored)		Tolić (penalty scored); Barseghyan (penalty missed); Ihnatenko (penalty scored); Mak (penalty missed)

== UEFA Champions League ==
As the Slovak First Football League champions, Slovan entered the competition in the first qualifying round.

=== First qualifying round ===
The first qualifying round draw was held on 18 June 2024, Slovan were drawn against Macedonian First Football League champions Struga.

Wed, 10 July 2024 First leg	Slovan Bratislava (Slovakia)	4–2	(North Macedonia) Struga	Bratislava, Slovakia
19:00 CEST	Weiss 16', (yellow card) 64'; Mak 36'; Kucka 85', 90+1'; Bajrić (yellow card) 87'	Report (Slovan); Report (UEFA)	Ibraimi 55' (pen.), 74'; Jevtoski (yellow card) 86'; Krivanjeva (yellow card) 90+4'	Stadium: Tehelné pole Attendance: 11,259; Referee: Stéphanie Frappart (France)

Wed, 17 July 2024 Second leg	Struga (North Macedonia)	1–2 (3–6 agg.)	(Slovakia) Slovan Bratislava	Ohrid, North Macedonia
17:00 CEST	Vosha (yellow card) 15'; Krivanjeva (yellow card) 45+3'; Jevtoski (yellow card) 65'; Ukpa (yellow card) 68'; Compaoré 86'	Report (Slovan); Report (UEFA)	Weiss 9'; Ristevski 34' (o.g.); Strelec (yellow card) 47'	Stadium: SRC Biljanini Izvori; Attendance: 1,223; Referee: Ricardo de Burgos Bengoetxea (Spain)

=== Second qualifying round ===
The second qualifying round draw was held on 19 June 2024, Slovan were drawn against Slovenian PrvaLiga champions Celje.

Wed, 24 July 2024 First leg	Celje (Slovenia)	1–1	(Slovakia) Slovan Bratislava	Celje, Slovenia
20:15 CEST	Bobičanec 7'; Kučys (yellow card) 56'; Karničnik (yellow card) 74'	Report (Slovan); Report (UEFA)	Takáč (yellow card) 4'; Strelec 11'; Savvidis (red card) 30'; Weiss (yellow card) 31'; Mak (yellow card) 45+2'	Stadium: Stadion Z'dežele; Attendance: 4,382; Referee: Darren England (England)

Tue, 30 July 2024 Second leg	Slovan Bratislava (Slovakia)	5–0 (6–1 agg.)	(Slovenia) Celje	Bratislava, Slovakia
20:30 CEST	Tolić 17', (yellow card) 45'; Strelec 30', 72'; Mak 60'; Barseghyan 75'	Report (Slovan); Report (UEFA)	Vuklišević (red card) 16'; Dulca (yellow card) 90+2'	Stadium: Tehelné pole Attendance: 17,197; Referee: Fabio Maresca (Italy)

=== Third qualifying round ===
The third qualifying round draw was held on 22 July 2024, Slovan were drawn against Cypriot First Division champions APOEL.

Wed, 7 August 2024 First leg	Slovan Bratislava (Slovakia)	2–0	(Cyprus) APOEL	Bratislava, Slovakia
20:30 CEST	Bajrić (yellow card) 57'; Petrović 74' (o.g.); Kashia (yellow card) 84'; Mak 90+3'	Report (Slovan); Report (UEFA)	Tejera (yellow card) 18'; Sušić (yellow card) 36'; Kostadinov (yellow card) 67'	Stadium: Tehelné pole Attendance: 20,404; Referee: Allard Lindhout (Netherlands)

Tue, 13 August 2024 Second leg	APOEL (Cyprus)	0–0 (0–2 agg.)	(Slovakia) Slovan Bratislava	Nicosia, Cyprus
19:00 CEST	Chebake (yellow card) 13'; Petrović (yellow card) 45+1' (yellow-red card) 81'	Report (Slovan); Report (UEFA)	Tolić (yellow card) 11'; Wimmer (yellow card) 25'; Weiss (yellow card) 29'; Kucka (yellow card) 78'; Takáč (yellow card) 79'	Stadium: GSP Stadium; Attendance: 13,507; Referee: Sascha Stegemann (Germany)

=== Play-off round ===
The play-off round draw was held on 5 August 2024, Slovan were drawn against Danish Superliga champions Midtjylland.

Wed, 21 August 2024 First leg	Midtjylland (Denmark)	1–1	(Slovakia) Slovan Bratislava	Herning, Denmark
21:00 CEST	Osorio (yellow card) 30'; Chilufya 79'	Report (Slovan); Report (UEFA)	Szöke (yellow card) 52'; Blackman 59'	Stadium: MCH Arena; Attendance: 9,202; Referee: Alejandro Hernández Hernández (Spain)

Wed, 28 August 2024 Second leg	Slovan Bratislava (Slovakia)	3–2 (4–3 agg.)	(Denmark) Midtjylland	Bratislava, Slovakia
21:00 CEST	Tolić 33', 82', (yellow card) 45+2'; Wimmer (yellow card) 64'; Barseghyan 86'; Blackman (yellow card) 90+1'	Report (Slovan); Report (UEFA)	Şimşir 41'; Djú 50'; Diao (yellow card) 64'; Buksa (yellow card) 90+6'	Stadium: Tehelné pole Attendance: 21,609; Referee: Tobias Stieler (Germany)

=== League phase ===
The league phase draw was held on 29 August 2024.

Pos	Team	Pld	W	D	L	GF	GA	GD	Pts
32	(German Football Association) RB Leipzig	8	1	0	7	8	15	−7	3
33	(Royal Spanish Football Federation) Girona	8	1	0	7	5	13	−8	3
34	(Austrian Football Association) Red Bull Salzburg	8	1	0	7	5	27	−22	3
35	(Slovak Football Association) Slovan Bratislava	8	0	0	8	7	27	−20	0
36	(Swiss Football Association) Young Boys	8	0	0	8	3	24	−21	0

Source: UEFA
Rules for classification: League phase tiebreakers

Round	1	2	3	4	5	6	7	8
Ground	A	H	A	H	H	A	H	A
Result	L	L	L	L	L	L	L	L
Position	34	35	36	36	35	35	35	35
Points	0	0	0	0	0	0	0	0

Source: UEFA
A = Away; H = Home; W = Win; D = Draw; L = Loss

==== Matches ====
Wed, 18 September 2024 1	Celtic (Scotland)	5–1	(Slovakia) Slovan Bratislava	Glasgow, Scotland
20:00 BST	Scales 17'; Johnston (yellow card) 22'; Furuhashi 47'; Engels 56' (pen.); Maeda 70'; Carter-Vickers (yellow card) 80'; Idah 86'	Report (Slovan); Report (UEFA)	Weiss (yellow card) 18'; Wimmer (yellow card) 22', (goal) 60'; Tolić (yellow card) 26'	Stadium: Celtic Park; Attendance: 56,826; Referee: Danny Makkelie (Netherlands)

Tue, 1 October 2024 2	Slovan Bratislava (Slovakia)	0–4	(England) Manchester City	Bratislava, Slovakia
21:00 CEST		Report (Slovan); Report (UEFA)	Gündoğan 8'; Foden 15'; Haaland 58'; McAtee 74'	Stadium: Tehelné pole Attendance: 22,500; Referee: Davide Massa (Italy)

Tue, 22 October 2024 3	Girona (Spain)	2–0	(Slovakia) Slovan Bratislava	Girona, Spain
21:00 CEST	Gutiérrez 42'; Francés (yellow card) 45'; Juanpe 73'; Stuani (penalty missed) 88'	Report (Slovan); Report (UEFA)	Tolić (yellow card) 16'; Ihnatenko (yellow card) 69'; Barseghyan (yellow card) 71'	Stadium: Estadi Montilivi; Attendance: 9,246; Referee: Horațiu Feșnic (Romania)

Tue, 5 November 2024 4	Slovan Bratislava (Slovakia)	1–4	(Croatia) Dinamo Zagreb	Bratislava, Slovakia
18:45 CET	Strelec 5'; Kashia (yellow card) 61'; Ihnatenko (yellow card) 87'	Report (Slovan); Report (UEFA)	Špikić 10'; Sučić 30'; Kulenović 54', 72'; Ogiwara (yellow card) 66'; Kačavenda (yellow card) 90+1'	Stadium: Tehelné pole Attendance: 22,132; Referee: Anthony Taylor (England)

Tue, 26 November 2024 5	Slovan Bratislava (Slovakia)	2–3	(Italy) Milan	Bratislava, Slovakia
18:45 CET	Barseghyan 24'; Marcelli 88'; Tolić (yellow card) 90' (yellow-red card) 90'; Bajrić (yellow card) 90+6'	Report (Slovan); Report (UEFA)	Pulisic 21'; Chukwueze (yellow card) 54'; Calabria (yellow card) 58'; Leão 68'; Abraham 71'; Tomori (yellow card) 79'	Stadium: Tehelné pole Attendance: 22,500; Referee: José María Sánchez Martínez (Spain)

Wed, 11 December 2024 6	Atlético Madrid (Spain)	3–1	(Slovakia) Slovan Bratislava	Madrid, Spain
18:45 CET	Alvarez 16'; Griezmann 42', 57'	Report (Slovan); Report (UEFA)	Strelec 51' (pen.)	Stadium: Metropolitano Stadium; Attendance: 59,134; Referee: Manfredas Lukjančukas (Lithuania)

Tue, 21 January 2025 7	Slovan Bratislava (Slovakia)	1–3	(Germany) VfB Stuttgart	Bratislava, Slovakia
21:00 CET	Kashia (yellow card) 30'; Savvidis (yellow card) 45+2'; Metsoko 85'; Barseghyan (yellow card) 90'	Report (Slovan); Report (UEFA)	Leweling 11', 36'; Rouault (yellow card) 25'; Undav (yellow card) 54'; Keitel (yellow card) 61'; Rieder 87'	Stadium: Tehelné pole Attendance: 22,500; Referee: Chris Kavanagh (England)

Wed, 29 January 2025 8	Bayern Munich (Germany)	3–1	(Slovakia) Slovan Bratislava	Munich, Germany
21:00 CET	Müller 8'; Kane 63'; Coman 84'	Report (Slovan); Report (UEFA)	Blackman (yellow card) 32'; Bajrić (yellow card) 81'; Savvidis (yellow card) 81'; Tolić 90'	Stadium: Allianz Arena; Attendance: 75,000; Referee: João Pinheiro (Portugal)

== Statistics ==
=== Goalscorers ===
As of match played 17 May 2025

No.	Pos.	Nat.	Name	Slovak First League	Slovak Cup	Champions League	Total
4	DF	(Georgia (country))	Guram Kashia	2	2		4
5	MF	(Ghana)	Rahim Ibrahim	2			2
6	DF	(Austria)	Kevin Wimmer			1	1
7	MF	(Slovakia)	Vladimír Weiss Jr.	1		2	3
8	FW	(Nigeria)	Elvis Isaac		3		3
10	MF	(Croatia)	Marko Tolić	2	3	4	9
11	MF	(Armenia)	Tigran Barseghyan	20	1	3	24
12	DF	(Slovenia)	Kenan Bajrić	2			2
13	FW	(Slovakia)	David Strelec	20		5	25
17	DF	(Czech Republic)	Jurij Medveděv		1		1
18	MF	(Slovakia)	Nino Marcelli	3	1	1	5
21	FW	(Slovakia)	Róbert Mak	10	2	3	15
23	DF	(Ghana)	Sharani Zuberu	2	1		3
26	MF	(Slovakia)	Artur Gajdoš		1		1
27	DF	(Slovakia)	Matúš Vojtko		2		2
28	DF	(Panama)	César Blackman	1		1	2
33	MF	(Slovakia)	Juraj Kucka			2	2
77	MF	(Ukraine)	Danylo Ihnatenko	3	1		4
93	FW	(Togo)	Idjessi Metsoko	1	2	1	4
Own goals				5		2	7
Total				74	20	25	119

=== Attendances ===
As of match played 17 May 2025

	Matches	Attendances	Average	High	Low
Slovak First Football League	16	117,738	7,359	14,125	3,058
Slovak Cup	2	10,576	5,288	7,816	2,760
Champions League	8	160,101	20,013	22,500	11,259
Total	26	288,415	11,093	22,500	2,760
