= Idjessi Metsoko =

Togolese footballer (born 2002)

- Metsoko with Dundee United in 2026

Personal information
- Full name: Idjessi Yethro Metsoko
- Date of birth: 14 March 2002 (age 24)
- Place of birth: Stains, France
- Height: 1.91 m (6 ft 3 in)
- Position: Forward

Team information
- Current team: Dundee United (on loan from Viktoria Plzeň)
- Number: 93

Youth career
- –2021: Auxerre

Senior career*
Years	Team	Apps	(Gls)
2021–2023	Auxerre B	31	(3)
2023	Vyškov	16	(9)
2024–	Viktoria Plzeň	8	(2)
2024–2025	→ Slovan Bratislava (loan)	22	(1)
2025–2026	→ Spartak Trnava (loan)	16	(4)
2026–	→ Dundee United (loan)	0	(0)

International career^{‡}
2026–	Togo	1	(1)
- * Club domestic league appearances and goals as of 16 May 2026 ‡ National team caps and goals as of 28 March 2026

Idjessi Yethro Metsoko (born 14 March 2002) is a professional footballer who plays as a forward for Scottish club Dundee United, on loan from Viktoria Plzeň. Born in France, he plays for the Togo national team.

== Club career ==
A youth product of Auxerre, Metsoko joined Czech side MFK Vyškov in July 2023, signing a professional contract. He netted 9 goals in 16 appearances in the Czech National Football League (2nd tier).

=== Viktoria Plzeň ===
He signed professional contract (until July 2027) with FC Viktoria Plzeň on 23 February 2024. Coming on as a substitute in the 80th minute against Slovan Liberec, the 22-year-old center forward scored his first goal for his new team ten minutes later with a right-footed strike, however his goal didn't prevent Plzeň from avoiding a 3–1 defeat.

==== Slovan Bratislava (loan) ====
On 26 August 2024, Slovan Bratislava announced a signing Metsoko on one-year loan with option to buy, from Czech side FC Viktoria Plzeň. Metsoko appeared in both 2024–25 UEFA Champions League play-off round matches against Danish FC Midtjylland and helped the club to reach UEFA Champions League league phase for the first time in the club history. On 21 January 2025, Metsoko scored a goal in a 3–1 loss to VfB Stuttgart.

==== 2025–2026 season ====
On 3 June 2025, it was announced that Metsoko would joining Spartak Trnava on a one-year loan deal with option to buy. Once Michal Ščasný had been appointed as manager of Spartak, he made it clear that Metsoko wouldn't be playing for him. It was rumored that he would have his loan cut short and be returned to Plzeň but after the speculations, Metsoko stayed in Trnava. After the sacking of Ščasný, Spartak would play against KFC Komárno. Metsoko would come off the bench in the 82nd minute and score in the 93rd minute to increase the score to 2–0 in his club’s favor. After celebrating his goal, Metsoko would go and thank Spartak’s interim manager Martin Škrtel for giving him a chance. He would score again in a 3–1 league win against FK Železiarne Podbrezová, scoring in the 94th minute to secure a win. Metsoko made his first start for Spartak in the final match of the year against MFK Skalica. Starting on the wing instead of Timotej Kudlička due to him receiving 5 yellow cards, Metsoko would score in the 45th minute of the game to increase the score to 2–0.

==== Loan to Dundee United ====
On 6 July 2026, Metsoko joined Dundee United on a one-year loan deal with option to buy.

== International career ==
After being selected by the hopes of Togo national team, Metsoko admitted during an interview that his dream has always been to represent his native country. Following good performances for Spartak Trnava, Metsoko would be selected to be a part of the Togo national football team ahead of a friendly against Guinea. He made his international debut in a 2–2 draw against Guinea, scoring a penalty in the 83rd minute to put his team up 2–0.

== Style of play ==
Metsoko plays as a forward. He is known for his strength.

== Career statistics ==
As of match played 26 April 2025

Appearances and goals by club, season and competition
Club	Season	League			Cup		Europe		Other		Total	
Club	Season	Division	Apps	Goals	Apps	Goals	Apps	Goals	Apps	Goals	Apps	Goals
Auxerre B	2021–22	CFA 2	16	3	—		—		—		16	3
Auxerre B	2022–23	CFA 2	15	0	—		—		—		15	0
Auxerre B	Total		31	3	—		—		—		31	3
Vyškov	2023–24	Czech National Football League	16	9	2	1	—		—		18	10
Viktoria Plzeň	2023–24	Czech First League	7	2	2	0	—		—		9	2
Viktoria Plzeň	2024–25	Czech First League	1	0	0	0	0	0	—		1	0
Viktoria Plzeň	Total		8	2	2	0	0	0	—		10	2
Slovan Bratislava (loan)	2024–25	Slovak First Football League	22	1	3	2	9 (Note: Appearances in UEFA Champions League)	1	—		34	4
Spartak Trnava	2025–26	Slovak First Football League	1	1	0	0	0	0	2	0		
Career total			78	16	7	3	9	1	2	0	93	19

=== International goals ===
No.	Date	Venue	Opponent	Score	Result	Competition
11	27 March 2026	Moulay El Hassan Stadium, Rabat, Morocco	Guinea	2–0	2–2	Friendly
