= 2024–25 UEFA Champions League qualifying =

European football tournament

2024–25 UEFA Champions League qualifying was the preliminary phase of the 2024–25 UEFA Champions League, prior to the competition proper. Qualification consisted of the qualifying phase (first to third rounds) and the play-off round. It began on 9 July and ended on 28 August 2024.

A total of 52 teams competed in the qualifying system, with 42 teams in the Champions Path and 10 teams in the League Path. The seven winners in the play-off round (five from Champions Path, two from League Path) advanced to the league phase, to join the 29 teams that entered it.

Times are CEST (UTC+2), as listed by UEFA (local times, if different, are in parentheses).

== Format ==
The qualifying phase and play-off round was split into two paths – the Champions Path and the League Path. The Champions Path contained teams which qualified as the winners of their domestic league, and the League Path contained teams which qualified as runners-up, third-placed or fourth-placed teams from their domestic league.

Each tie was played over two legs, with each team playing one leg at home. The team that scored more goals on aggregate over the two legs advanced to the next round. If the aggregate score was level at the end of normal time of the second leg, extra time was played, and if the same number of goals was scored by both teams during extra time, the tie was determined by a penalty shoot-out.

In the draws for each round, teams were seeded based on their UEFA club coefficients at the beginning of the season, with the teams divided into seeded and unseeded pots containing the same number of teams. A seeded team was drawn against an unseeded team, with the order of legs in each tie decided by draw. As the identity of the winners of the previous round may not have been known at the time of the draws, the seeding was carried out under the assumption that the team with the higher coefficient of an undecided tie advanced to the subsequent round, which meant if the team with the lower coefficient advanced, it would simply take the seeding of its opponent. Prior to the draws, UEFA could form "groups" in accordance with the principles set by the Club Competitions Committee purely for the convenience of the draw and not to resemble any real groupings in the sense of the competition. Teams from associations with political conflicts as decided by UEFA could not be drawn into the same tie. After the draws, the order of legs of a tie could be reversed by UEFA due to scheduling or venue conflicts.

== Schedule ==
The schedule of the competition was as follows. All matches were played on Tuesdays and Wednesdays.

Schedule for 2024–25 UEFA Champions League
Round	Draw date	First leg	Second leg
First qualifying round	18 June 2024	9–10 July 2024	16–17 July 2024
Second qualifying round	19 June 2024	23–24 July 2024	30–31 July 2024
Third qualifying round	22 July 2024	6–7 August 2024	13 August 2024
Play-off round	5 August 2024	20–21 August 2024	27–28 August 2024

== Teams ==
=== Champions Path ===
The Champions Path included all league champions which did not qualify directly for the league phase, and consisted of the following rounds:

- First qualifying round (28 teams): 28 teams which entered in this round.
- Second qualifying round (24 teams): 10 teams which entered in this round, and 14 winners of the first qualifying round.
- Third qualifying round (12 teams): 12 winners of the second qualifying round.
- Play-off round (10 teams): 4 teams which entered in this round, and 6 winners of the third qualifying round.

All teams eliminated from the Champions Path entered either the Europa League or the Conference League:

- 12 of the 14 losers of the first qualifying round entered the Conference League Champions Path second qualifying round.
- 2 losers of the first qualifying round received a bye and entered the Conference League Champions Path third qualifying round.
- The 12 losers of the second qualifying round entered the Europa League Champions Path third qualifying round
- The 6 losers of the third qualifying round entered the Europa League play-off round.
- The 5 losers of the play-off round entered the Europa League league phase.

Below were the participating teams of the Champions Path (with their 2024 UEFA club coefficients), grouped by their starting rounds.

Key to colours
Winners of play-off round advanced to league phase
Losers of play-off round entered Europa League league phase
Losers of third qualifying round entered Europa League play-off round
Losers of second qualifying round entered Europa League third qualifying round
Losers of the first qualifying round that received a bye entered Conference League third qualifying round
Losers of the first qualifying round entered Conference League second qualifying round

Play-off round
Team	Coeff.
(Croatia) Dinamo Zagreb	50.000
(Serbia) Red Star Belgrade	40.000
(Switzerland) Young Boys	34.500
(Turkey) Galatasaray	31.500

Second qualifying round
Team	Coeff.
(Greece) PAOK	37.000
(Israel) Maccabi Tel Aviv	35.500
(Hungary) Ferencváros	35.000
(Azerbaijan) Qarabağ	33.000
(Norway) Bodø/Glimt	28.000
(Denmark) Midtjylland	25.500
(Czech Republic) Sparta Prague	22.500
(Sweden) Malmö FF	18.500
(Cyprus) APOEL	14.500
(Poland) Jagiellonia Białystok	5.075

First qualifying round
Team	Coeff.
(Slovakia) Slovan Bratislava	30.500
(Bulgaria) Ludogorets Razgrad	26.000
(Finland) HJK	11.500
(Estonia) Flora	11.000
(Romania) FCSB	10.500
(Faroe Islands) KÍ	10.000
(Republic of Ireland) Shamrock Rovers	9.500
(Gibraltar) Lincoln Red Imps	9.000
(Wales) The New Saints	8.500
(Armenia) Pyunik	8.000
(Latvia) RFS	8.000
(Moldova) Petrocub Hîncești	7.000
(Kosovo) Ballkani	6.000
(Bosnia and Herzegovina) Borac Banja Luka	5.500
(Georgia (country)) Dinamo Batumi	5.500
(Slovenia) Celje	4.500
(Malta) Hamrun Spartans	4.500
(Northern Ireland) Larne	4.500
(Belarus) Dinamo Minsk	4.500
(Lithuania) Panevėžys	4.000
(Kazakhstan) Ordabasy	4.000
(Iceland) Víkingur Reykjavík	4.000
(North Macedonia) Struga	3.500
(Luxembourg) Differdange 03	3.500
(Montenegro) Dečić	2.000
(Albania) Egnatia	1.475
(Andorra) UE Santa Coloma	1.199
(San Marino) Virtus	0.366

=== League Path ===
The League Path included all league non-champions which did not qualify directly for the league phase, and consisted of the following rounds:

- Second qualifying round (4 teams): 4 teams which entered in this round.
- Third qualifying round (8 teams): 6 teams which entered in this round, and 2 winners of the second qualifying round.
- Play-off round (4 teams): 4 winners of the third qualifying round.

All teams eliminated from the League Path entered the Europa League:

- The 2 losers of the second qualifying round entered the Main Path third qualifying round.
- The 4 losers of the third qualifying round entered the league phase.
- The 2 losers of the play-off round entered the league phase.

Below were the participating teams of the League Path (with their 2024 UEFA club coefficients), grouped by their starting rounds.

Key to colours
Winners of play-off round advanced to league phase
Losers of play-off round entered Europa League league phase
Losers of third qualifying round entered Europa League league phase
Losers of second qualifying round entered Europa League third qualifying round

Third qualifying round
Team	Coeff.
(Scotland) Rangers	63.000
(Czech Republic) Slavia Prague	53.000
(Austria) Red Bull Salzburg	50.000
(France) Lille	47.000
(Belgium) Union Saint-Gilloise	27.000
(Netherlands) Twente	12.260

Second qualifying round
Team	Coeff.
(Turkey) Fenerbahçe	36.000
(Ukraine) Dynamo Kyiv	26.500
(Serbia) Partizan	25.500
(Switzerland) Lugano	8.000

== First qualifying round ==
The draw for the first qualifying round was held on 18 June 2024.

=== Seeding ===
A total of 28 teams played in the first qualifying round. Seeding of the teams was based on their 2024 UEFA club coefficients. Before the draw, UEFA allocated the teams into three groups, two with five seeded and five unseeded teams and one with four seeded and four unseeded team per the principles set by the Club Competitions Committee. The first team drawn in each tie was the home team for the first leg.

Group 1		Group 2		Group 3	
Seeded	Unseeded	Seeded	Unseeded	Seeded	Unseeded
(Slovakia) Slovan Bratislava; (Gibraltar) Lincoln Red Imps; (Wales) The New Saints; (Kosovo) Ballkani; (Bosnia and Herzegovina) Borac Banja Luka	(Malta) Hamrun Spartans; (North Macedonia) Struga; (Montenegro) Dečić; (Albania) Egnatia; (Andorra) UE Santa Coloma	(Finland) HJK; (Estonia) Flora; (Faroe Islands) KÍ; (Republic of Ireland) Shamrock Rovers; (Latvia) RFS	(Slovenia) Celje; (Northern Ireland) Larne; (Lithuania) Panevėžys; (Iceland) Víkingur Reykjavík; (Luxembourg) Differdange 03	(Bulgaria) Ludogorets Razgrad; (Romania) FCSB; (Armenia) Pyunik; (Moldova) Petrocub Hîncești	(Georgia (country)) Dinamo Batumi; (Belarus) Dinamo Minsk; (Kazakhstan) Ordabasy; (San Marino) Virtus

=== Summary ===
The first legs were played on 9 and 10 July, and the second legs were played on 16 and 17 July 2024.

The winners of the ties advanced to the Champions Path second qualifying round. 12 of the 14 losers were transferred to the Conference League Champions Path second qualifying round and 2 were transferred to the Conference League Champions Path qualifying and received a bye to the third qualifying round.

First qualifying round
Team 1	Agg.	Team 2	1st leg	2nd leg
Slovan Bratislava (Slovakia)	6–3	(North Macedonia) Struga	4–2	2–1
The New Saints (Wales)	4–1	(Montenegro) Dečić	3–0	1–1
Borac Banja Luka (Bosnia and Herzegovina)	2–2 (4–1 p)	(Albania) Egnatia	1–0	1–2 (a.e.t.)
Hamrun Spartans (Malta)	1–1 (4–5 p)	(Gibraltar) Lincoln Red Imps	0–1	1–0 (a.e.t.)
UE Santa Coloma (Andorra)	3–3 (6–5 p) (Note: Order of legs reversed after original draw.)	(Kosovo) Ballkani	1–2	2–1 (a.e.t.)
Flora (Estonia)	1–7	(Slovenia) Celje	0–5	1–2
KÍ (Faroe Islands)	2–0	(Luxembourg) Differdange 03	2–0	0–0
Panevėžys (Lithuania)	4–1	(Finland) HJK	3–0	1–1
RFS (Latvia)	7–0	(Northern Ireland) Larne	3–0	4–0
Víkingur Reykjavík (Iceland)	1–2	(Republic of Ireland) Shamrock Rovers	0–0	1–2
Virtus (San Marino)	1–11	(Romania) FCSB	1–7	0–4
Ludogorets Razgrad (Bulgaria)	3–2	(Georgia (country)) Dinamo Batumi	3–1	0–1
Ordabasy (Kazakhstan)	0–1	(Moldova) Petrocub Hîncești	0–0	0–1
Dinamo Minsk (Belarus)	1–0	(Armenia) Pyunik	0–0	1–0

=== Matches ===
10 July 2024
19:00

Slovan Bratislava (Slovakia)	4–2	(North Macedonia) Struga
Weiss 16'; Mak 36'; Kucka 85', 90+1'	Report	Ibraimi 55' (pen.), 74'

Tehelné pole, Bratislava
Attendance: 11,259
Referee: Stéphanie Frappart (France)
17 July 2024
17:00

Struga (North Macedonia)	1–2	(Slovakia) Slovan Bratislava
Compaoré 85'	Report	Weiss 9'; Ristevski 34' (o.g.)

SRC Biljanini Izvori, Ohrid (Note: Struga played their home match at the SRC Biljanini Izvori in Ohrid, instead of their regular stadium, the Gradska Plaža Stadium, in Struga, which did not meet UEFA requirements.)
Attendance: 1,223
Referee: Ricardo de Burgos Bengoetxea (Spain)

Slovan Bratislava won 6–3 on aggregate.

9 July 2024
20:00 (19:00 UTC+1)

The New Saints (Wales)	3–0	(Montenegro) Dečić
Young 4', 28'; Davies 39'	Report

Park Hall, Oswestry
Attendance: 810
Referee: Bram Van Driessche (Belgium)
16 July 2024
21:00

Dečić (Montenegro)	1–1	(Wales) The New Saints
Kajević 72'	Report	Young 43' (pen.)

Podgorica City Stadium, Podgorica (Note: Dečić played their home match at the Podgorica City Stadium in Podgorica, instead of their regular stadium, the Stadion Tuško Polje, in Tuzi, which did not meet UEFA requirements.)
Attendance: 1,400
Referee: Atilla Karaoğlan (Turkey)

The New Saints won 4–1 on aggregate.

10 July 2024
21:00

Borac Banja Luka (Bosnia and Herzegovina)	1–0	(Albania) Egnatia
Hrelja 90+6'	Report

Banja Luka City Stadium, Banja Luka
Attendance: 7,832
Referee: Daniel Stefański (Poland)
17 July 2024
21:00

Egnatia (Albania)	2–1 (a.e.t.)	(Bosnia and Herzegovina) Borac Banja Luka
İbrahimoğlu 17'; Doukouo 82'	Report	Lukić 30'
Penalties
Aleksi (penalty missed); İbrahimoğlu (penalty scored); Lushkja (penalty missed)	1–4	(penalty scored) Herrera; (penalty scored) Pejović; (penalty scored) Hasukić; (penalty scored) Čavić

Elbasan Arena, Elbasan (Note: Egnatia played their home match at the Elbasan Arena in Elbasan, instead of their regular stadium, the Egnatia Arena, in Rrogozhinë, due to renovation works.)
Attendance: 2,000
Referee: Fabio Maresca (Italy)

2–2 on aggregate; Borac Banja Luka won 4–1 on penalties.

9 July 2024
18:45

Hamrun Spartans (Malta)	0–1	(Gibraltar) Lincoln Red Imps
	Report	Britto 37'

Centenary Stadium, Ta' Qali
Attendance: 1,342
Referee: Aleksandar Stavrev (North Macedonia)
16 July 2024
18:00

Lincoln Red Imps (Gibraltar)	0–1 (a.e.t.)	(Malta) Hamrun Spartans
	Report	Vitão 89'
Penalties
Britto (penalty scored); Nano (penalty scored); De Barr (penalty scored); Toni (penalty scored); Muñoz (penalty scored)	5–4	(penalty scored) Emerson; (penalty scored) Montebello; (penalty scored) Mayron; (penalty scored) Mbong; (penalty missed) Borg

Europa Sports Park, Gibraltar (Note: Lincoln Red Imps played their home matches at Europa Sports Park, instead of the Victoria Stadium, due to renovation works.)
Attendance: 720
Referee: Eric Wattellier (France)

1–1 on aggregate; Lincoln Red Imps won 5–4 on penalties.

9 July 2024
20:00

UE Santa Coloma (Andorra)	1–2	(Kosovo) Ballkani
El Ghazoui 22'	Report	Emërllahu 42' (pen.); Karrica 90'

Estadi Nacional, Andorra la Vella
Attendance: 445
Referee: Marcel Birsan (Romania)
16 July 2024
16:30

Ballkani (Kosovo)	1–2 (a.e.t.)	(Andorra) UE Santa Coloma
Hamidi 109'	Report	Mohedano 90+2'; De Jesús 102'
Penalties
Emërllahu (penalty missed); Dulaj (penalty scored); Hamidi (penalty scored); Ajazaj (penalty scored); Potoku (penalty scored); Abedini (penalty scored); Thaqi (penalty missed)	5–6	(penalty scored) García; (penalty scored) El Ghazoui; (penalty scored) Joaquinete; (penalty scored) De Jesús; (penalty missed) Virgili; (penalty scored) Tellado; (penalty scored) Lluch

Zahir Pajaziti Stadium, Podujevo (Note: Ballkani played their home match at the Zahir Pajaziti Stadium in Podujevo, instead of their regular stadium, the Suva Reka City Stadium, in Suva Reka, which did not meet UEFA requirements.)
Attendance: 1,000
Referee: Oleksiy Derevinskyi (Ukraine)

3–3 on aggregate; UE Santa Coloma won 6–5 on penalties.

10 July 2024
18:00 (19:00 UTC+3)

Flora (Estonia)	0–5	(Slovenia) Celje
	Report	Matko 7'; Vuklišević 10'; Zabukovnik 45+1'; Aarons 71'; Svetlin 90'

Lilleküla Stadium, Tallinn
Attendance: 2,002
Referee: Alejandro Muñiz Ruiz (Spain)
16 July 2024
19:00

Celje (Slovenia)	2–1	(Estonia) Flora
Matko 73' (pen.); Karničnik 76'	Report	Varjund 12'

Stadion Z'dežele, Celje
Attendance: 2,382
Referee: Goga Kikacheishvili (Georgia)

Celje won 7–1 on aggregate.

10 July 2024
20:00 (19:00 UTC+1)

KÍ (Faroe Islands)	2–0	(Luxembourg) Differdange 03
Frederiksberg 12', 45+4' (pen.)	Report

Við Djúpumýrar, Klaksvík
Attendance: 1,161
Referee: David Munro (Scotland)
17 July 2024
19:00

Differdange 03 (Luxembourg)	0–0	(Faroe Islands) KÍ
	Report

Stade Municipal de la Ville de Differdange, Differdange
Attendance: 1,950
Referee: Javier Alberola Rojas (Spain)

KÍ won 2–0 on aggregate.

9 July 2024
17:30 (18:30 UTC+3)

Panevėžys (Lithuania)	3–0	(Finland) HJK
Veliulis 17'; Gorobsov 64' (pen.); Mbo 67'	Report

Aukštaitija Stadium, Panevėžys
Attendance: 1,100
Referee: Luca Cibelli (Switzerland)
16 July 2024
18:00 (19:00 UTC+3)

HJK (Finland)	1–1	(Lithuania) Panevėžys
Erwin 38'	Report	Veliulis 45'

Bolt Arena, Helsinki
Attendance: 5,292
Referee: Craig Pawson (England)

Panevėžys won 4–1 on aggregate.

10 July 2024
19:00 (20:00 UTC+3)

RFS (Latvia)	3–0	(Northern Ireland) Larne
Ķigurs 30'; Balodis 49'; Panić 60'	Report

LNK Sporta Parks, Riga
Attendance: 1,700
Referee: Ondřej Berka (Czech Republic)
17 July 2024
21:00 (20:00 UTC+1)

Larne (Northern Ireland)	0–4	(Latvia) RFS
	Report	Emerson 38'; Lemajić 44'; Ikaunieks 45+3'; Diomandé 56'

Inver Park, Larne
Attendance: 2,030
Referee: Gustavo Correia (Portugal)

RFS won 7–0 on aggregate.

9 July 2024
20:45 (18:45 UTC+0)

Víkingur Reykjavík (Iceland)	0–0	(Republic of Ireland) Shamrock Rovers
	Report

Víkingsvöllur, Reykjavík
Attendance: 1,108
Referee: Sigurd Kringstad (Norway)
16 July 2024
21:00 (20:00 UTC+1)

Shamrock Rovers (Republic of Ireland)	2–1	(Iceland) Víkingur Reykjavík
Kenny 8', 20'	Report	Hansen 60'

Tallaght Stadium, Tallaght
Attendance: 7,632
Referee: Jarred Gillett (England)

Shamrock Rovers won 2–1 on aggregate.

9 July 2024
21:00

Virtus (San Marino)	1–7	(Romania) FCSB
Battistini 86'	Report	Olaru 6' (pen.), 11', 37'; Dan. Popa 22', 27'; Miculescu 70', 73'

San Marino Stadium, Serravalle
Attendance: 1,863
Referee: Antoni Bandić (Bosnia and Herzegovina)
16 July 2024
19:30 (20:30 UTC+3)

FCSB (Romania)	4–0	(San Marino) Virtus
Băluță 20'; Edjouma 28', 36'; Miculescu 72'	Report

Steaua Stadium, Bucharest (Note: FCSB played their home matches at the Steaua Stadium, instead of their regular stadium, the Arena Națională, as it was being used for a series of concerts including Ed Sheeran.)
Attendance: 7,262
Referee: Stefan Ebner (Austria)

FCSB won 11–1 on aggregate.

10 July 2024
20:00 (21:00 UTC+3)

Ludogorets Razgrad (Bulgaria)	3–1	(Georgia (country)) Dinamo Batumi
Tekpetey 13'; Rick 24'; Witry 72'	Report	Mamuchashvili 62'

Huvepharma Arena, Razgrad
Attendance: 4,561
Referee: Robert Schröder (Germany)
17 July 2024
19:00 (21:00 UTC+4)

Dinamo Batumi (Georgia (country))	1–0	(Bulgaria) Ludogorets Razgrad
Mamuchashvili 3'	Report

Adjarabet Arena, Batumi
Attendance: 14,967
Referee: Dario Bel (Croatia)

Ludogorets Razgrad won 3–2 on aggregate.

10 July 2024
17:00 (20:00 UTC+5)

Ordabasy (Kazakhstan)	0–0	(Moldova) Petrocub Hîncești
	Report

Kazhimukan Munaitpasov Stadium, Shymkent
Attendance: 16,500
Referee: Patrik Kolarić (Croatia)
17 July 2024
19:00 (20:00 UTC+3)

Petrocub Hîncești (Moldova)	1–0	(Kazakhstan) Ordabasy
Lungu 34'	Report

Stadionul Zimbru, Chișinău (Note: Petrocub Hîncești played their home matches at the Zimbru Stadium in Chișinău, instead of their regular stadium, the Stadionul Municipal, in Hîncești, which did not meet UEFA requirements.)
Attendance: 6,752
Referee: Miloš Milanović (Serbia)

Petrocub Hîncești won 1–0 on aggregate.

10 July 2024
20:45

Dinamo Minsk (Belarus)	0–0	(Armenia) Pyunik
	Report

Mezőkövesdi Városi Stadion, Mezőkövesd, Hungary (Note: Due to the country's involvement in the Russian invasion of Ukraine, Belarusian teams were required to play their home matches at neutral venues and behind closed doors until further notice.)
Attendance: 0
Referee: Volen Chinkov (Bulgaria)
16 July 2024
18:00 (20:00 UTC+4)

Pyunik (Armenia)	0–1	(Belarus) Dinamo Minsk
	Report	Hawrylovich 90' (pen.)

Vazgen Sargsyan Republican Stadium, Yerevan
Attendance: 7,400
Referee: Snir Levy (Israel)

Dinamo Minsk won 1–0 on aggregate.

== Second qualifying round ==
The draw for the second qualifying round was held on 19 June 2024.

=== Seeding ===
A total of 28 teams played in the second qualifying round – 24 in the Champions Path and 4 in the League Path. Seeding of the teams was based on their 2024 UEFA club coefficients. Before the draw, UEFA allocated the teams into three groups of four seeded and four unseeded teams per the principles set by the Club Competitions Committee. The first team drawn in each tie was the home team for the first leg.

Champions Path
Group 1		Group 2		Group 3	
Seeded	Unseeded	Seeded	Unseeded	Seeded	Unseeded
(Greece) PAOK; (Hungary) Ferencváros; (Bulgaria) Ludogorets Razgrad; (Cyprus) APOEL	(Wales) The New Saints; (Belarus) Dinamo Minsk; (Moldova) Petrocub Hîncești; (Bosnia and Herzegovina) Borac Banja Luka	(Norway) Bodø/Glimt; (Denmark) Midtjylland; (Czech Republic) Sparta Prague; (Sweden) Malmö FF	(Faroe Islands) KÍ; (Republic of Ireland) Shamrock Rovers; (Latvia) RFS; (Andorra) UE Santa Coloma	(Israel) Maccabi Tel Aviv; (Azerbaijan) Qarabağ; (Slovakia) Slovan Bratislava; (Lithuania) Panevėžys	(Slovenia) Celje; (Romania) FCSB; (Gibraltar) Lincoln Red Imps; (Poland) Jagiellonia Białystok

League Path
Seeded	Unseeded
(Turkey) Fenerbahçe; (Ukraine) Dynamo Kyiv	(Serbia) Partizan; (Switzerland) Lugano

Notes

1. ^{†} Winners of the first qualifying round, whose identity was not known at the time of draw. Teams in italics defeated a team with a higher coefficient, thus effectively taking the coefficient of their opponent in the draw.

=== Summary ===
The first legs were played on 23 and 24 July, and the second legs were played on 30 and 31 July 2024.

The winners of the ties advanced to the third qualifying round of their respective path. The Champions Path losers were transferred to the Europa League Champions Path third qualifying round, while the League Path losers were transferred to the Europa League Main Path third qualifying round.

Second qualifying round
Team 1	Agg.	Team 2	1st leg	2nd leg
Champions Path
Ludogorets Razgrad (Bulgaria)	2–1	(Belarus) Dinamo Minsk	2–0	0–1
APOEL (Cyprus)	2–1	(Moldova) Petrocub Hîncești	1–0	1–1
Ferencváros (Hungary)	7–1	(Wales) The New Saints	5–0	2–1
PAOK (Greece)	4–2	(Bosnia and Herzegovina) Borac Banja Luka	3–2	1–0
Bodø/Glimt (Norway)	7–1	(Latvia) RFS	4–0	3–1
Malmö FF (Sweden)	6–4	(Faroe Islands) KÍ	4–1	2–3
Shamrock Rovers (Republic of Ireland)	2–6	(Czech Republic) Sparta Prague	0–2	2–4
UE Santa Coloma (Andorra)	0–4	(Denmark) Midtjylland	0–3	0–1
Celje (Slovenia)	1–6	(Slovakia) Slovan Bratislava	1–1	0–5
Panevėžys (Lithuania)	1–7	(Poland) Jagiellonia Białystok	0–4	1–3
Lincoln Red Imps (Gibraltar)	0–7	(Azerbaijan) Qarabağ	0–2	0–5
FCSB (Romania)	2–1	(Israel) Maccabi Tel Aviv	1–1	1–0
League Path
Lugano (Switzerland)	4–6	(Turkey) Fenerbahçe	3–4	1–2
Dynamo Kyiv (Ukraine)	9–2	(Serbia) Partizan	6–2	3–0

=== Champions Path matches ===
24 July 2024
20:00 (21:00 UTC+3)

Ludogorets Razgrad (Bulgaria)	2–0	(Belarus) Dinamo Minsk
Tekpetey 9'; Nedelev 45+1' (pen.)	Report

Huvepharma Arena, Razgrad
Attendance: 5,323
Referee: Eldorjan Hamiti (Albania)
31 July 2024
20:45

Dinamo Minsk (Belarus)	1–0	(Bulgaria) Ludogorets Razgrad
Bakhar 37'	Report

Mezőkövesdi Városi Stadion, Mezőkövesd, Hungary
Attendance: 10
Referee: Yigal Frid (Israel)

Ludogorets Razgrad won 2–1 on aggregate.

23 July 2024
19:00 (20:00 UTC+3)

APOEL (Cyprus)	1–0	(Moldova) Petrocub Hîncești
Marquinhos 38' (pen.)	Report

GSP Stadium, Nicosia
Attendance: 13,801
Referee: Robert Schröder (Germany)
30 July 2024
19:00 (20:00 UTC+3)

Petrocub Hîncești (Moldova)	1–1	(Cyprus) APOEL
S. Plătică 60'	Report	Marquinhos 65'

Stadionul Zimbru, Chișinău
Attendance: 7,500
Referee: Fedayi San (Switzerland)

APOEL won 2–1 on aggregate.

23 July 2024
20:00

Ferencváros (Hungary)	5–0	(Wales) The New Saints
Traoré 15', 21', 54'; Zachariassen 24'; Marquinhos 62' (pen.)	Report

Ferencváros Stadion, Budapest
Attendance: 16,231
Referee: Guillermo Cuadra Fernández (Spain)
30 July 2024
20:00 (19:00 UTC+1)

The New Saints (Wales)	1–2	(Hungary) Ferencváros
Daniels 90+1'	Report	Zachariassen 43'; Rommens 62' (pen.)

Park Hall, Oswestry
Attendance: 1,022
Referee: Damian Sylwestrzak (Poland)

Ferencváros won 7–1 on aggregate.

24 July 2024
19:30 (20:30 UTC+3)

PAOK (Greece)	3–2	(Bosnia and Herzegovina) Borac Banja Luka
Koulierakis 17', 39'; Troost-Ekong 51'	Report	Herrera 22' (pen.); Kulašin 45+3'

Toumba Stadium, Thessaloniki
Attendance: 16,135
Referee: David Šmajc (Slovenia)
31 July 2024
21:00

Borac Banja Luka (Bosnia and Herzegovina)	0–1	(Greece) PAOK
	Report	Murg 25'

Banja Luka City Stadium, Banja Luka
Attendance: 9,500
Referee: Sander van der Eijk (Netherlands)

PAOK won 4–2 on aggregate.

23 July 2024
17:00

Bodø/Glimt (Norway)	4–0	(Latvia) RFS
Mikkelsen 2', 76'; Saltnes 18'; Kapskarmo 40'	Report

Aspmyra Stadion, Bodø
Attendance: 5,427
Referee: Don Robertson (Scotland)
31 July 2024
19:00 (20:00 UTC+3)

RFS (Latvia)	1–3	(Norway) Bodø/Glimt
Ikaunieks 14'	Report	Hauge 40' (pen.); Saltnes 82'; Høgh 88'

LNK Sporta Parks, Riga
Attendance: 1,678
Referee: Jakob Sundberg (Denmark)

Bodø/Glimt won 7–1 on aggregate.

23 July 2024
19:00

Malmö FF (Sweden)	4–1	(Faroe Islands) KÍ
Johnsen 21', 43'; Bolin 37'; Rieks 85'	Report	Frederiksberg 71'

Stadion, Malmö
Attendance: 18,432
Referee: Lukas Fähndrich (Switzerland)
30 July 2024
20:45 (19:45 UTC+1)

KÍ (Faroe Islands)	3–2	(Sweden) Malmö FF
Berntsson 2'; Frederiksberg 65', 90+5'	Report	Bolin 13'; Christiansen 59' (pen.)

Við Djúpumýrar, Klaksvík
Attendance: 1,247
Referee: Vitālijs Spasjoņņikovs (Latvia)

Malmö FF won 6–4 on aggregate.

23 July 2024
20:00 (19:00 UTC+1)

Shamrock Rovers (Republic of Ireland)	0–2	(Czech Republic) Sparta Prague
	Report	Birmančević 38'; Wiesner 65'

Tallaght Stadium, Tallaght
Attendance: 9,684
Referee: Joey Kooij (Netherlands)
30 July 2024
19:00

Sparta Prague (Czech Republic)	4–2	(Republic of Ireland) Shamrock Rovers
Olatunji 29'; Ross 41'; Sørensen 48'; Tuci 71'	Report	Greene 32', 47'

Stadion Letná, Prague
Attendance: 17,367
Referee: Simone Sozza (Italy)

Sparta Prague won 6–2 on aggregate.

23 July 2024
20:00

UE Santa Coloma (Andorra)	0–3	(Denmark) Midtjylland
	Report	Djú 12'; Diao 28'; Şimşir 63'

Estadi Nacional, Andorra la Vella
Attendance: 664
Referee: Abdulkadir Bitigen (Turkey)
31 July 2024
19:15

Midtjylland (Denmark)	1–0	(Andorra) UE Santa Coloma
Osorio 72'	Report

MCH Arena, Herning
Attendance: 7,917
Referee: Rob Hennessy (Republic of Ireland)

Midtjylland won 4–0 on aggregate.

24 July 2024
20:15

Celje (Slovenia)	1–1	(Slovakia) Slovan Bratislava
Bobičanec 7'	Report	Strelec 11'

Stadion Z'dežele, Celje
Attendance: 4,382
Referee: Darren England (England)
30 July 2024
20:30

Slovan Bratislava (Slovakia)	5–0	(Slovenia) Celje
Tolić 17'; Strelec 30', 72'; Mak 60'; Barseghyan 75'	Report

Tehelné pole, Bratislava
Attendance: 17,197
Referee: Fabio Maresca (Italy)

Slovan Bratislava won 6–1 on aggregate.

23 July 2024
17:30 (18:30 UTC+3)

Panevėžys (Lithuania)	0–4	(Poland) Jagiellonia Białystok
	Report	Imaz 15', 28', 29'; Hansen 80'

Aukštaitija Stadium, Panevėžys
Attendance: 3,850
Referee: Novak Simović (Serbia)
31 July 2024
20:30

Jagiellonia Białystok (Poland)	3–1	(Lithuania) Panevėžys
Pululu 12' (pen.), 69' (pen.); Beneta 84' (o.g.)	Report	Gussiås 88'

Jagiellonia Stadium, Białystok
Attendance: 17,589
Referee: Vassilis Fotias (Greece)

Jagiellonia Białystok won 7–1 on aggregate.

23 July 2024
18:00

Lincoln Red Imps (Gibraltar)	0–2	(Azerbaijan) Qarabağ
	Report	Juninho 45+2'; Bayramov 75'

Europa Sports Park, Gibraltar
Attendance: 724
Referee: István Vad (Hungary)
30 July 2024
18:00 (20:00 UTC+4)

Qarabağ (Azerbaijan)	5–0	(Gibraltar) Lincoln Red Imps
Juninho 17', 31', 44'; Benzia 66'; Leandro 72'	Report

Tofiq Bahramov Republican Stadium, Baku
Attendance: 23,700
Referee: Viktor Kopiievskyi (Ukraine)

Qarabağ won 7–0 on aggregate.

23 July 2024
19:30 (20:30 UTC+3)

FCSB (Romania)	1–1	(Israel) Maccabi Tel Aviv
Dawa 76'	Report	Biton 71'

Steaua Stadium, Bucharest
Attendance: 26,235
Referee: Gergő Bogár (Hungary)
31 July 2024
20:00

Maccabi Tel Aviv (Israel)	0–1	(Romania) FCSB
	Report	Baeten 90'

Bozsik Aréna, Budapest, Hungary (Note: Due to the Gaza war, Israeli teams were required to play their home matches at neutral venues until further notice.)
Attendance: 643
Referee: Jérémie Pignard (France)

FCSB won 2–1 on aggregate.

=== League Path matches ===
23 July 2024
20:30

Lugano (Switzerland)	3–4	(Turkey) Fenerbahçe
El Wafi 4'; Bislimi 64'; Valenzuela 90+4'	Report	Džeko 45+1' (pen.), 46', 67'; Kadıoğlu 74'

Stockhorn Arena, Thun (Note: Lugano played their home match at the Stockhorn Arena, in Thun, instead of their regular stadium, the Cornaredo Stadium, in Lugano, due to renovation works.)
Attendance: 6,009
Referee: Tiago Martins (Portugal)
30 July 2024
19:00 (20:00 UTC+3)

Fenerbahçe (Turkey)	2–1	(Switzerland) Lugano
Džeko 59'; Szymański 90+3'	Report	Mahmoud 7'

Şükrü Saracoğlu Stadium, Istanbul
Attendance: 37,281
Referee: Robert Jones (England)

Fenerbahçe won 6–4 on aggregate.

23 July 2024
20:00

Dynamo Kyiv (Ukraine)	6–2	(Serbia) Partizan
Shaparenko 40'; Brazhko 43'; Karavayev 45+1'; Kabayev 55'; Popov 83'; Pikhalyonok 90+2'	Report	Saldanha 22' (pen.), 66'

Arena Lublin, Lublin, Poland (Note: Due to the Russian invasion of Ukraine, Ukrainian teams were required to play their home matches at neutral venues until further notice.)
Attendance: 4,712
Referee: Christian Dingert (Germany)
31 July 2024
19:00

Partizan (Serbia)	0–3	(Ukraine) Dynamo Kyiv
	Report	Yarmolenko 17'; Vanat 68' (pen.); Karavayev 90+3'

Partizan Stadium, Belgrade
Attendance: 10 (Note: The Partizan v Dynamo Kyiv match was played behind closed doors due to a punishment by UEFA to Partizan for discriminatory and racist behaviour of their fans during the match against Nordsjælland in the 2023–24 UEFA Europa Conference League qualifying phase.)
Referee: Marian Barbu (Romania)

Dynamo Kyiv won 9–2 on aggregate.

== Third qualifying round ==
The draw for the third qualifying round was held on 22 July 2024.

=== Seeding ===
A total of 20 teams played in the third qualifying round – 12 in the Champions Path and 8 in the League Path. Seeding of the teams was based on their 2024 UEFA club coefficients. Prior to the draw, UEFA formed groups of seeded and unseeded teams per the principles set by the Club Competitions Committee. The first team drawn in each tie was the home team for the first leg.

Champions Path
Group 1		Group 2	
Seeded	Unseeded	Seeded	Unseeded
(Romania) FCSB; (Azerbaijan) Qarabağ; (Slovakia) Slovan Bratislava	(Bulgaria) Ludogorets Razgrad; (Czech Republic) Sparta Prague; (Cyprus) APOEL	(Greece) PAOK; (Hungary) Ferencváros; (Norway) Bodø/Glimt	(Denmark) Midtjylland; (Sweden) Malmö FF; (Poland) Jagiellonia Białystok

League Path
Seeded	Unseeded
(Scotland) Rangers; (Czech Republic) Slavia Prague; (Austria) Red Bull Salzburg; (France) Lille	(Turkey) Fenerbahçe; (Belgium) Union Saint-Gilloise; (Ukraine) Dynamo Kyiv; (Netherlands) Twente

Notes

1. ^{†} Winners of the second qualifying round, whose identity was not known at the time of draw. Teams in italics defeated a team with a higher coefficient, thus effectively taking the coefficient of their opponent in the draw.

=== Summary ===
The first legs were played on 6 and 7 August, and the second legs were played on 13 August 2024.

The winners of the ties advanced to the play-off round of their respective paths. The Champions Path losers were transferred to the Europa League play-off round, while the League Path losers were transferred to the Europa League league phase.

Third qualifying round
Team 1	Agg.	Team 2	1st leg	2nd leg
Champions Path
Qarabağ (Azerbaijan)	8–4	(Bulgaria) Ludogorets Razgrad	1–2	7–2 (a.e.t.)
Slovan Bratislava (Slovakia)	2–0	(Cyprus) APOEL	2–0	0–0
Sparta Prague (Czech Republic)	4–3	(Romania) FCSB	1–1	3–2
Malmö FF (Sweden)	6–5	(Greece) PAOK	2–2	4–3 (a.e.t.)
Midtjylland (Denmark)	3–1	(Hungary) Ferencváros	2–0	1–1
Jagiellonia Białystok (Poland)	1–5	(Norway) Bodø/Glimt	0–1	1–4
League Path
Slavia Prague (Czech Republic)	4–1	(Belgium) Union Saint-Gilloise	3–1	1–0
Lille (France)	3–2	(Turkey) Fenerbahçe	2–1	1–1 (a.e.t.)
Dynamo Kyiv (Ukraine)	3–1	(Scotland) Rangers	1–1	2–0
Red Bull Salzburg (Austria)	5–4	(Netherlands) Twente	2–1	3–3

=== Champions Path matches ===
6 August 2024
18:00 (20:00 UTC+4)

Qarabağ (Azerbaijan)	1–2	(Bulgaria) Ludogorets Razgrad
Juninho 65'	Report	Almeida 56'; Vidal 87'

Tofiq Bahramov Republican Stadium, Baku
Attendance: 29,300
Referee: Urs Schnyder (Switzerland)
13 August 2024
20:00 (21:00 UTC+3)

Ludogorets Razgrad (Bulgaria)	2–7 (a.e.t.)	(Azerbaijan) Qarabağ
Duah 13', 23' (pen.)	Report	Juninho 7'; Benzia 45+1' (pen.), 118'; P. Andrade 45+5', 112'; Bayramov 93'; Xhixha 111'

Huvepharma Arena, Razgrad
Attendance: 7,700
Referee: Simone Sozza (Italy)

Qarabağ won 8–4 on aggregate.

7 August 2024
20:30

Slovan Bratislava (Slovakia)	2–0	(Cyprus) APOEL
Petrović 74' (o.g.); Mak 90+3'	Report

Tehelné pole, Bratislava
Attendance: 20,404
Referee: Allard Lindhout (Netherlands)
13 August 2024
19:00 (20:00 UTC+3)

APOEL (Cyprus)	0–0	(Slovakia) Slovan Bratislava
	Report

GSP Stadium, Nicosia
Attendance: 13,507
Referee: Sascha Stegemann (Germany)

Slovan Bratislava won 2–0 on aggregate.

6 August 2024
20:00

Sparta Prague (Czech Republic)	1–1	(Romania) FCSB
Olatunji 78'	Report	Dawa 61'

Stadion Letná, Prague
Attendance: 17,229
Referee: Rohit Saggi (Norway)
13 August 2024
20:30 (21:30 UTC+3)

FCSB (Romania)	2–3	(Czech Republic) Sparta Prague
Olaru 60'; Edjouma 85'	Report	Birmančević 13', 28' (pen.); Haraslín 37'

Steaua Stadium, Bucharest
Attendance: 28,875
Referee: Morten Krogh (Denmark)

Sparta Prague won 4–3 on aggregate.

6 August 2024
19:00

Malmö FF (Sweden)	2–2	(Greece) PAOK
Jansson 28'; Nanasi 67'	Report	Taison 42'; Rahman 75'

Stadion, Malmö
Attendance: 18,658
Referee: John Beaton (Scotland)
13 August 2024
19:30 (20:30 UTC+3)

PAOK (Greece)	3–4 (a.e.t.)	(Sweden) Malmö FF
Taison 21'; Koulierakis 43'; Živković 45+3'	Report	Nanasi 10', 45'; Zätterström 90+6'; Christiansen 99'

Toumba Stadium, Thessaloniki
Attendance: 17,678
Referee: Marco Di Bello (Italy)

Malmö FF won 6–5 on aggregate.

6 August 2024
19:15

Midtjylland (Denmark)	2–0	(Hungary) Ferencváros
Buksa 17'; Djú 69'	Report

MCH Arena, Herning
Attendance: 8,449
Referee: Matej Jug (Slovenia)
13 August 2024
20:00

Ferencváros (Hungary)	1–1	(Denmark) Midtjylland
Cissé 17'	Report	O. Sørensen 50'

Ferencváros Stadion, Budapest
Attendance: 18,027
Referee: Orel Grinfeeld (Israel)

Midtjylland won 3–1 on aggregate.

7 August 2024
20:45

Jagiellonia Białystok (Poland)	0–1	(Norway) Bodø/Glimt
	Report	Diéguez 58' (o.g.)

Jagiellonia Stadium, Białystok
Attendance: 19,447
Referee: Sven Jablonski (Germany)
13 August 2024
19:00

Bodø/Glimt (Norway)	4–1	(Poland) Jagiellonia Białystok
Fet 34', 56'; Määttä 38'; Høgh 70'	Report	Berg 4' (o.g.)

Aspmyra Stadion, Bodø
Attendance: 7,228
Referee: Benoît Bastien (France)

Bodø/Glimt won 5–1 on aggregate.

=== League Path matches ===
7 August 2024
19:00

Slavia Prague (Czech Republic)	3–1	(Belgium) Union Saint-Gilloise
Chorý 19', 41'; Dorley 57'	Report	Bužek 73' (o.g.)

Fortuna Arena, Prague
Attendance: 18,470
Referee: Tobias Stieler (Germany)
13 August 2024
20:30

Union Saint-Gilloise (Belgium)	0–1	(Czech Republic) Slavia Prague
	Report	Jurečka 84'

Constant Vanden Stock Stadium, Brussels (Note: Union Saint-Gilloise played their home match at the Constant Vanden Stock Stadium, instead of their regular stadium, the Joseph Marien Stadium, which did not meet UEFA requirements.)
Attendance: 5,499
Referee: Srđan Jovanović (Serbia)

Slavia Prague won 4–1 on aggregate.

6 August 2024
20:30

Lille (France)	2–1	(Turkey) Fenerbahçe
Santos 12'; Zhegrova 90+1'	Report	Kahveci 80'

Stade du Hainaut, Valenciennes (Note: Lille played their home matches at the Stade du Hainaut, in Valenciennes, instead of their regular stadium, the Stade Pierre-Mauroy, in Villeneuve-d'Ascq, as it was being used for the 2024 Summer Olympics.)
Attendance: 12,908
Referee: István Kovács (Romania)
13 August 2024
19:00 (20:00 UTC+3)

Fenerbahçe (Turkey)	1–1 (a.e.t.)	(France) Lille
Diakité 90+1' (o.g.)	Report	David 118' (pen.)

Şükrü Saracoğlu Stadium, Istanbul
Attendance: 40,474
Referee: José María Sánchez Martínez (Spain)

Lille won 3–2 on aggregate.

6 August 2024
20:00

Dynamo Kyiv (Ukraine)	1–1	(Scotland) Rangers
Yarmolenko 37'	Report	Dessers 90+4'

Arena Lublin, Lublin, Poland
Attendance: 8,315
Referee: Donatas Rumšas (Lithuania)
13 August 2024
20:45 (19:45 UTC+1)

Rangers (Scotland)	0–2	(Ukraine) Dynamo Kyiv
	Report	Pikhalyonok 82'; Voloshyn 84'

Hampden Park, Glasgow (Note: Rangers played their home match at Hampden Park, instead of their regular stadium, Ibrox Stadium, due to renovation works.)
Attendance: 39,180
Referee: Marco Guida (Italy)

Dynamo Kyiv won 3–1 on aggregate.

6 August 2024
20:45

Red Bull Salzburg (Austria)	2–1	(Netherlands) Twente
Kjærgaard 40', 85'	Report	Vlap 90'

Red Bull Arena, Salzburg
Attendance: 17,381
Referee: António Nobre (Portugal)
13 August 2024
19:00

Twente (Netherlands)	3–3	(Austria) Red Bull Salzburg
Hilgers 43'; Van Hoorenbeeck 64'; Steijn 87'	Report	Kjærgaard 17'; Nene 25'; Yeo 46'

De Grolsch Veste, Enschede
Attendance: 29,200
Referee: Irfan Peljto (Bosnia and Herzegovina)

Red Bull Salzburg won 5–4 on aggregate.

== Play-off round ==
The draw for the play-off round was held on 5 August 2024.

=== Seeding ===
A total of 14 teams played in the play-off round – 10 in the Champions Path and 4 in the League Path. Seeding of the teams was based on their 2024 UEFA club coefficients. The teams were divided into seeded and unseeded pots. The first team drawn in each tie was the home team for the first leg.

Champions Path
Seeded	Unseeded
(Croatia) Dinamo Zagreb; (Serbia) Red Star Belgrade; (Sweden) Malmö FF; (Denmark) Midtjylland; (Switzerland) Young Boys	(Azerbaijan) Qarabağ; (Turkey) Galatasaray; (Slovakia) Slovan Bratislava; (Norway) Bodø/Glimt; (Czech Republic) Sparta Prague

League Path
Seeded	Unseeded
(Ukraine) Dynamo Kyiv; (Czech Republic) Slavia Prague	(Austria) Red Bull Salzburg; (France) Lille

Notes

1. ^{†} Winners of the third qualifying round, whose identity was not known at the time of draw. Teams in italics defeated a team with a higher coefficient, thus effectively taking the coefficient of their opponent in the draw.

=== Summary ===
The first legs were played on 20 and 21 August, and the second legs were played on 27 and 28 August 2024.

The winners of the ties advanced to the league phase. The losers were transferred to the Europa League league phase.

Play-off round
Team 1	Agg.	Team 2	1st leg	2nd leg
Champions Path
Young Boys (Switzerland)	4–2	(Turkey) Galatasaray	3–2	1–0
Dinamo Zagreb (Croatia)	5–0	(Azerbaijan) Qarabağ	3–0	2–0
Midtjylland (Denmark)	3–4	(Slovakia) Slovan Bratislava	1–1	2–3
Bodø/Glimt (Norway)	2–3	(Serbia) Red Star Belgrade	2–1	0–2
Malmö FF (Sweden)	0–4	(Czech Republic) Sparta Prague	0–2	0–2
League Path
Lille (France)	3–2	(Czech Republic) Slavia Prague	2–0	1–2
Dynamo Kyiv (Ukraine)	1–3	(Austria) Red Bull Salzburg	0–2	1–1

=== Champions Path matches ===
21 August 2024
21:00

Young Boys (Switzerland)	3–2	(Turkey) Galatasaray
Monteiro 3', 45+4'; Ugrinić 86' (pen.)	Report	Batshuayi 66', 72'

Stadion Wankdorf, Bern
Attendance: 31,500
Referee: Daniel Siebert (Germany)
27 August 2024
21:00 (22:00 UTC+3)

Galatasaray (Turkey)	0–1	(Switzerland) Young Boys
	Report	Virginius 87'

Rams Park, Istanbul
Attendance: 46,827
Referee: Espen Eskås (Norway)

Young Boys won 4–2 on aggregate.

20 August 2024
21:00

Dinamo Zagreb (Croatia)	3–0	(Azerbaijan) Qarabağ
Pjaca 29'; Kulenović 75', 80'	Report

Stadion Maksimir, Zagreb
Attendance: 14,073
Referee: Glenn Nyberg (Sweden)
28 August 2024
18:45

Qarabağ (Azerbaijan)	0–2	(Croatia) Dinamo Zagreb
	Report	Pjaca 32'; Silva 53' (o.g.)

Tofiq Bahramov Republican Stadium, Baku
Attendance: 29,800
Referee: Michael Oliver (England)

Dinamo Zagreb won 5–0 on aggregate.

21 August 2024
21:00

Midtjylland (Denmark)	1–1	(Slovakia) Slovan Bratislava
Chilufya 79'	Report	Blackman 59'

MCH Arena, Herning
Attendance: 9,202
Referee: Alejandro Hernández Hernández (Spain)
28 August 2024
21:00

Slovan Bratislava (Slovakia)	3–2	(Denmark) Midtjylland
Tolić 33', 82'; Barseghyan 86'	Report	Şimşir 41'; Djú 50'

Tehelné pole, Bratislava
Attendance: 21,609
Referee: Tobias Stieler (Germany)

Slovan Bratislava won 4–3 on aggregate.

20 August 2024
21:00

Bodø/Glimt (Norway)	2–1	(Serbia) Red Star Belgrade
Bjørtuft 52'; Määttä 62'	Report	Mimović 75'

Aspmyra Stadion, Bodø
Attendance: 7,909
Referee: Ivan Kružliak (Slovakia)
28 August 2024
21:00

Red Star Belgrade (Serbia)	2–0	(Norway) Bodø/Glimt
Duarte 26' (pen.); Spajić 59'	Report

Red Star Stadium, Belgrade
Attendance: 46,167
Referee: Davide Massa (Italy)

Red Star Belgrade won 3–2 on aggregate.

21 August 2024
21:00

Malmö FF (Sweden)	0–2	(Czech Republic) Sparta Prague
	Report	Stryger 31' (o.g.); Ryneš 89'

Stadion, Malmö
Attendance: 20,589
Referee: Jesús Gil Manzano (Spain)
27 August 2024
21:00

Sparta Prague (Czech Republic)	2–0	(Sweden) Malmö FF
Haraslín 80' (pen.); Rrahmani 83'	Report

Stadion Letná, Prague
Attendance: 18,215
Referee: Clément Turpin (France)

Sparta Prague won 4–0 on aggregate.

=== League Path matches ===
20 August 2024
21:00

Lille (France)	2–0	(Czech Republic) Slavia Prague
David 52'; Zhegrova 77'	Report

Stade du Hainaut, Valenciennes
Attendance: 15,019
Referee: Szymon Marciniak (Poland)
28 August 2024
21:00

Slavia Prague (Czech Republic)	2–1	(France) Lille
Zafeiris 5'; Schranz 84'	Report	Zhegrova 77'

Eden Arena, Prague
Attendance: 18,848
Referee: Slavko Vinčić (Slovenia)

Lille won 3–2 on aggregate.

21 August 2024
21:00

Dynamo Kyiv (Ukraine)	0–2	(Austria) Red Bull Salzburg
	Report	Nene 29'; Kjærgaard 50' (pen.)

Arena Lublin, Lublin, Poland
Attendance: 7,126
Referee: Sandro Schärer (Switzerland)
27 August 2024
21:00

Red Bull Salzburg (Austria)	1–1	(Ukraine) Dynamo Kyiv
Daghim 12'	Report	Vanat 29'

Red Bull Arena, Salzburg
Attendance: 23,289
Referee: Halil Umut Meler (Turkey)

Red Bull Salzburg won 3–1 on aggregate.
