= Marko Tolić =

Croatian footballer

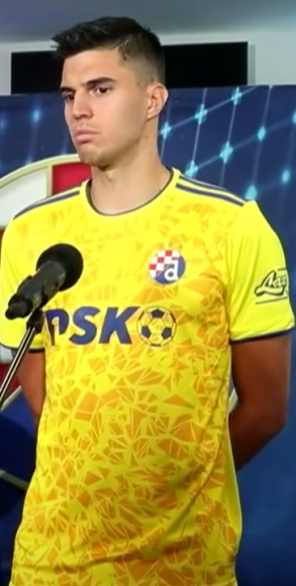
- Tolić in 2021

Personal information
- Date of birth: 5 July 1996 (age 30)
- Place of birth: Zagreb, Croatia
- Height: 1.89 m (6 ft 2 in)
- Position: Attacking midfielder

Team information
- Current team: Zhejiang FC
- Number: 10

Youth career
- 2003–2006: Croatia Sesvete
- 2006–2010: Dinamo Zagreb
- 2010–2012: Croatia Sesvete
- 2012–2015: Lokomotiva Zagreb

Senior career*
Years	Team	Apps	(Gls)
2014–2020	Lokomotiva Zagreb	32	(11)
2015	→ Sesvete (loan)	8	(0)
2015–2016	→ Hrvatski Dragovoljac (loan)	0	(0)
2016	→ Lučko (loan)	10	(2)
2016–2017	→ Gorica (loan)	2	(0)
2017	→ Lučko (loan)	4	(0)
2017–2019	→ Sesvete (loan)	48	(23)
2020–	Dinamo Zagreb	47	(6)
2020	Dinamo Zagreb II	1	(1)
2022–2023	→ Maribor (loan)	28	(7)
2023–2024	→ Slovan Bratislava (loan)	23	(9)
2023	→ Slovan Bratislava II (loan)	1	(0)
2024–2026	Slovan Bratislava	39	(7)
2026–	Zhejiang FC	29	(10)
- * Club domestic league appearances and goals as of 15:00, 8 November 2026 (UTC)

Marko Tolić (born 5 July 1996) is a Croatian professional footballer who plays as an attacking midfielder for Chinese club Zhejiang FC.

== Career statistics ==
As of match played 8 November 2026

Appearances and goals by club, season and competition
Club	Season	League			National cup (Note: Includes Croatian Football Cup, Slovak Cup)		Europe		Other		Total	
Club	Season	Division	Apps	Goals	Apps	Goals	Apps	Goals	Apps	Goals	Apps	Goals
Lokomotiva Zagreb	2014–15	SuperSport HNL	1	0	—		—		—		1	0
Lokomotiva Zagreb	2019–20	Superport HNL	31	11	5	3	—		—		36	14
Lokomotiva Zagreb	Total		32	11	5	3	—		—		37	14
Sesvete (loan)	2014–15	Prva NL	8	0	—		—		—		8	0
Hrvatski Dragovoljac (loan)	2015–16	Prva NL	0	0	—		—		—		0	0
Lučko (loan)	2015–16	Prva NL	10	2	—		—		—		10	2
Gorica (loan)	2016–17	Prva NL	2	0	—		—		—		2	0
Lučko (loan)	2016–17	Prva NL	4	0	—		—		—		4	0
Sesvete (loan)	2017–18	Prva NL	24	8	2	0	—		—		26	8
Sesvete (loan)	2018–19	Prva NL	24	15	0	0	—		—		24	15
Sesvete (loan)	Total		48	23	2	0	—		—		50	23
Dinamo Zagreb	2020–21	SuperSport HNL	21	4	4	0	4 (Note: Appearances in UEFA Europa League)	0	0	0	29	4
Dinamo Zagreb	2021–22	SuperSport HNL	24	2	3	1	4 (Note: One appearance in UEFA Champions League, three appearances in UEFA Europa League)	0	0	0	31	3
Dinamo Zagreb	2022–23	SuperSport HNL	2	0	0	0	0	0	0	0	2	0
Dinamo Zagreb	Total		47	6	7	1	8	0	0	0	62	7
Dinamo Zagreb II	2020–21	Prva NL	1	1	—		—		—		1	1
Maribor (loan)	2022–23	Slovenian PrvaLiga	28	7	5	4	—		—		33	11
Slovan Bratislava (loan)	2023–24	Nike Liga	23	9	5	2	13 (Note: Five appearances and one goal in UEFA Champions League, two appearances and one goal in UEFA Europa League, six appearances in UEFA Conference League)	2	—		41	13
Slovan Bratislava II (loan)	2023–24	MONACObet liga	1	0	—		—		—		1	0
Slovan Bratislava	2024–25	Nike Liga	29	2	4	3	14 (Note: Appearances in UEFA Champions League)	4	—		47	9
Slovan Bratislava	2025–26	Nike Liga	10	5	1	1	9 (Note: Four appearances and one goal in UEFA Champions League, two appearances in UEFA Europa League, three appearances in UEFA Conference League)	1	0	0	20	7
Slovan Bratislava	Total		39	7	5	4	23	5	0	0	67	16
Zhejiang FC	2026	Chinese Super League	29	10	0	0	—		—		29	10
Career total			272	76	29	14	44	7	0	0	345	97

== Honours ==
Dinamo Zagreb

- Prva HNL: 2020–21, 2021–22
- Croatian Cup: 2020–21
