= César Blackman =

Panamanian footballer (born 1998)

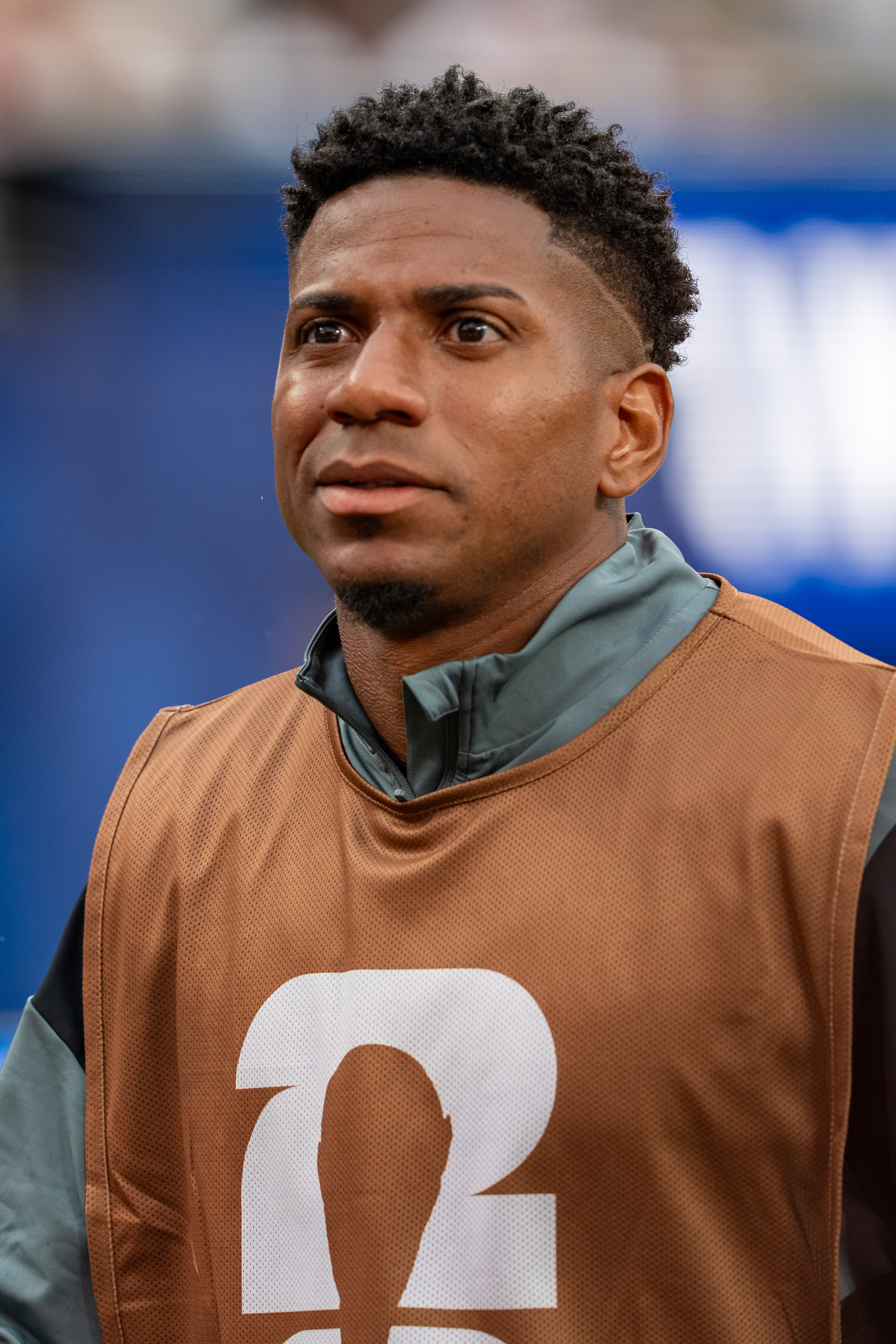
- Blackman with Panama in 2026

Personal information
- Full name: César Rodolfo Blackman Camarena
- Date of birth: 2 April 1998 (age 28)
- Place of birth: Panama City, Panama
- Height: 1.74 m (5 ft 9 in)
- Position: Right-back

Team information
- Current team: Slovan Bratislava
- Number: 28

Senior career*
Years	Team	Apps	(Gls)
2015–2017	Chorrillo	43	(1)
2017–2023	DAC Dunajská Streda	108	(3)
2023–	Slovan Bratislava	89	(5)

International career^{‡}
- Panama U17
2017	Panama U20	6	(0)
2019–	Panama	45	(3)
Medal record
Men's football
Representing Panama
CONCACAF Gold Cup
Runner-up	2023 United States–Canada	Team
CONCACAF Nations League
Runner-up	2025 United States	Team
- * Club domestic league appearances and goals as of 31 October 2026 ‡ National team caps and goals as of 17:30, 5 October 2026 (UTC)

César Rodolfo Blackman Camarena (born 2 April 1998) is a Panamanian professional footballer who plays as a right-back for Slovak First Football League club Slovan Bratislava and the Panama national team.

== Club career ==
Born in Panama City, Panama, Blackman was trained by the CD Universitario, then known as Chorrillo FC. He made his professional debut for the club on 8 November 2015, in a league match against Sporting San Miguelito. He started the match, and his team was defeated 1–2.

He then took his first steps in Europe by joining Slovak club Dunajská Streda in September 2017. He made his debut for his new club on 13 September 2017, in a Slovak Cup match against Lokomotíva Devínska Nová Ves. He started the match, and his team won 3–0.

In the summer of 2023, Blackman joined Slovan Bratislava. The transfer was officially announced on 14 June 2023, and he signed a three-year contract, keeping him at the club until June 2026.

== International career ==
Blackman was called up to the Panama national team for the first time by manager Julio Dely Valdés in March 2019. He earned his first cap during that international break, on 23 March 2019 against Brazil. He came on as a substitute for Michael Murillo, and the two teams drew 1–1.

In June 2024, Blackman was included in the list of Panamanian players selected by Thomas Christiansen to participate in the 2024 Copa América.

Blackman was included in the list of 26 Panamanian players called up by manager Thomas Christiansen to participate in the World Cup in 2026.

== Career statistics ==
=== Club ===
As of match played 3 November 2026

Appearances and goals by club, season and competition
Club	Season	League			National cup		Continental		Other		Total	
Club	Season	Division	Apps	Goals	Apps	Goals	Apps	Goals	Apps	Goals	Apps	Goals
Chorillo	2015–16	Liga LPF	8	0	0	0	–		–		8	0
Chorillo	2016–17	Liga LPF	30	1	0	0	–		–		30	1
Chorillo	2017–18	Liga LPF	5	0	0	0	–		–		5	0
Chorillo	Total		43	1	0	0	–		–		43	1
DAC Dunajská Streda	2017–18	Slovak First Football League	4	0	2	0	–		–		6	0
DAC Dunajská Streda	2018–19	Slovak First Football League	6	0	0	0	–		–		6	0
DAC Dunajská Streda	2019–20	Slovak First Football League	26	1	6	0	4 (Note: Appearances in UEFA Europa League)	0	–		36	1
DAC Dunajská Streda	2020–21	Slovak First Football League	27	0	1	0	3	0	–		31	0
DAC Dunajská Streda	2021–22	Slovak First Football League	18	0	2	1	0	0	–		20	1
DAC Dunajská Streda	2022–23	Slovak First Football League	27	2	3	0	6 (Note: Appearances in UEFA Conference League)	0	–		36	2
DAC Dunajská Streda	Total		108	3	14	1	13	0	–		135	4
Slovan Bratislava	2023–24	Slovak First Football League	26	2	1	0	10 (Note: One appearance in UEFA Champions League, two appearances in UEFA Europa League, seven appearances in UEFA Conference League)	0	0	0	37	2
Slovan Bratislava	2024–25	Slovak First Football League	27	1	6	0	15 (Note: Appearances in UEFA Champions League)	0	0	0	48	1
Slovan Bratislava	2025–26	Slovak First Football League	27	2	1	0	12 (Note: Four appearances in UEFA Champions League, two appearances in UEFA Europa League, six appearances and one goal in UEFA Conference League)	1	—		40	3
Slovan Bratislava	2026–27	Slovak First Football League	9	0	0	0	10	0	—		19	0
Slovan Bratislava	Total		89	5	8	0	47	1	0	0	144	6
Career total			214	8	22	1	60	1	0	0	285	10

=== International ===
As of match played 5 October 2026

Appearances and goals by national team and year
National team	Year	Apps	Goals
Panama	2019	3	0
Panama	2021	3	0
Panama	2022	3	0
Panama	2023	10	0
Panama	2024	9	2
Panama	2025	7	1
Panama	2026	10	0
Total		45	3

Scores and results list Panama’s goal tally first, score column indicates score after each Blackman goal.

List of international goals scored by César Blackman
No.	Date	Venue	Opponent	Score	Result	Competition
1	27 June 2024	Mercedes-Benz Stadium, Atlanta, United States	United States	1–1	2–1	2024 Copa América
2	18 November 2024	Estadio Rommel Fernández, Panama City, Panama	Costa Rica	1–0	2–2	2024–25 CONCACAF Nations League
3	18 November 2025	Estadio Rommel Fernández, Panama City, Panama	El Salvador	1–0	3–0	2026 FIFA World Cup qualification

== Honours ==
Panama

- CONCACAF Gold Cup runner-up: 2023
- CONCACAF Nations League runner-up: 2024–25

Individual

- Slovak Super Liga Goal of the Month:June/July 2020
- Slovak Super Liga Team of the Season: 2020-21
- Slovak Super Liga U-21 Team of the Season: 2019-20, 2020-21
