= Elvis Isaac =

Nigerian footballer

Personal information
- Full name: Elvis Akpooghene Isaac
- Date of birth: 15 August 2002 (age 24)
- Place of birth: Nigeria
- Positions: Left winger; forward

Team information
- Current team: Slávia TU Košice
- Number: 10

Senior career*
Years	Team	Apps	(Gls)
−2022	G12 FC		
2022−2023	Dubnica	41	(7)
2023–2025	Slovan Bratislava	3	(0)
2023−2024	→ Slovan Bratislava B	37	(14)
2025	České Budějovice	12	(0)
2025	Stripfing	0	(0)
2026	Slávia TU Košice	12	(2)
2026–	FC Petržalka	0	(0)
- * Club domestic league appearances and goals as of 25 May 2026

Elvis Isaac (born 15 August 2002) is a Nigerian footballer who plays for Slovak Second Football League club FC Petržalka as a left winger.

== Club career ==
=== Slovan Bratislava ===
Isaac made his professional Slovak First Football League debut for Slovan against MŠK Žilina on 4 May 2024.

=== Dynamo České Budějovice ===
On 24 February 2025, Isaac signed a contract with Czech First League club České Budějovice until 2026 with option.
