= 2008–09 FC Zürich season =

FC Zürich
2008–09 season
- Manager: Bernard Challandes
- Stadium: Letzigrund
- Swiss Super League: 1st
- Swiss Cup: Quarter-finals
- UEFA Cup: First round
- Top goalscorer: Almen Abdi (19)

During the 2008–09 Swiss football season, FC Zürich competed in the Swiss Super League.

== Season summary ==
FC Zürich managed to reclaim the Swiss league title (their last as of 2016), but were knocked out of the Swiss Cup in the quarter-finals. The club were knocked out of the UEFA Cup in the first round by Italian giants AC Milan.

== First-team squad ==
Squad at end of season

Note: Flags indicate national team as defined under FIFA eligibility rules; some limited exceptions apply. Players may hold more than one non-FIFA nationality.

No.	Pos.	Nation	Player
1	GK	(Switzerland) SUI	Johnny Leoni
2	DF	(Finland) FIN	Veli Lampi
3	FW	(Georgia (country)) GEO	Giorgi Ivanishvili
4	DF	(Switzerland) SUI	Fabrizio Di Gregorio
5	MF	(Switzerland) SUI	Xavier Margairaz (on loan from Osasuna)
6	MF	(Serbia) SRB	Radovan Savić
7	MF	(Switzerland) SUI	Silvan Aegerter
10	MF	(Nigeria) NGA	Onyekachi Okonkwo
11	MF	(Switzerland) SUI	Adrian Nikçi (Note: Nikçi was born in Sarajevo, SFR Yugoslavia (now Bosnia-Herzegovina), but also qualifies to represent Switzerland internationally and has represented them at U-21 level, and has also expressed interest in representing Albania internationally.)
12	FW	(Guadeloupe) GLP	Alexandre Alphonse (Note: Alphonse was born in Paris, France, but also qualifies to represent Guadeloupe internationally and made his international debut for Guadeloupe in 2009.)
13	DF	(Switzerland) SUI	Florian Stahel
14	MF	(Sweden) SWE	Dusan Djurić
15	DF	(Switzerland) SUI	Daniel Stucki

No.	Pos.	Nation	Player
16	DF	(Switzerland) SUI	Philippe Koch
17	MF	(Tunisia) TUN	Yassine Chikhaoui
19	DF	(Switzerland) SUI	Alain Rochat (Note: Rochat was born in Saint-Jean-sur-Richelieu, Canada, but was raised in Switzerland from the age of two and made his international debut for Switzerland in June 2005.)
21	DF	(Switzerland) SUI	Heinz Barmettler (Note: Barmettler was born in Zürich, Switzerland, and made his international debut for Switzerland in November 2009, but also qualifies to represent the Dominican Republic and would make his international debut for the Dominican Republic in September 2012.)
22	GK	(Switzerland) SUI	Orlando Lattmann
23	MF	(Switzerland) SUI	Almen Abdi (Note: Abdi was born in Prizren, SFR Yugoslavia (now Kosovo), but also qualifies to represent Switzerland internationally and made his international debut for Switzerland in August 2008.)
25	FW	(Switzerland) SUI	Admir Mehmedi (Note: Mehmedi was born in Gostivar, SFR Yugoslavia (now Macedonia), but was raised in Switzerland from the age of two and represented Switzerland at every youth level up to U-21, and would make his international debut for Switzerland in 2011.)
26	MF	(Liechtenstein) LIE	Martin Büchel
27	FW	(Switzerland) SUI	Marco Schönbächler
28	FW	(United States) USA	Remo Staubli
29	FW	(France) FRA	Eric Hassli
30	DF	(Finland) FIN	Hannu Tihinen
32	GK	(Italy) ITA	Andrea Guatelli

=== Left club during season ===
Note: Flags indicate national team as defined under FIFA eligibility rules; some limited exceptions apply. Players may hold more than one non-FIFA nationality.

No.	Pos.	Nation	Player
3	DF	(Switzerland) SUI	Mehdi Challandes (on loan to Yverdon Sport)
4	DF	(Chile) CHI	Adán Vergara (on loan to FC Luzern)
5	DF	(Switzerland) SUI	Oumar Kondé (on loan to Chengdu Blades)
8	FW	(Sweden) SWE	Emra Tahirović (Note: Tahirović was born in Sarajevo, SFR Yugoslavia (now Bosnia-Herzegovina), but was raised in Sweden and has represented them at U-21 level.) (on loan to Örebro)

No.	Pos.	Nation	Player
9	MF	(Sweden) SWE	Andrés Vasquez (Note: Vasquez was born in Lima, Peru, but also qualifies to represent Sweden internationally and has represented them at U-17, U-19 and U-21 level.) (to FC Zürich II)
20	FW	(Brazil) BRA	Sílvio (on loan to FC Wil)
24	MF	(Switzerland) SUI	Luca Ladner (on loan to FC Wohlen)
