= Ladner (surname) =

Ladner is a surname of Cornish origin. It's likely derived from the name 'Lanner', which itself derives from the Cornish word 'Lannergh', meaning 'clearing'.

Whilst the origin is unrelated, the name is also found in Austria, likely indicating someone from various places named 'Laden' or 'Ladendorf'. The name may also be a variant of Lautner. Notable people with the surname include:

- André Ladner (1962–2025), Swiss footballer and manager
- Benjamin Ladner (born 1941), American academic philosopher and theologian
- Bobby Ladner, American football coach
- Don Ladner (1948–2009), New Zealand rugby player
- Dorie Ladner (1942–2024), American civil rights activist and social worker
- Heber Austin Ladner (1902–1989), Secretary of State of Mississippi
- Jay Ladner (born 1965), American basketball coach
- Joyce Ladner (born 1943), American civil rights activist, author, civil servant and sociologist
- Kurt Ladner, a pen name of Nelson DeMille
- Leon Johnson Ladner (1884–1978), Canadian lawyer and Conservative politician
- Luca Ladner (born 1989), Swiss footballer
- Marco Ladner (born 1998), Austrian freestyle skier
- Mark Ladner, American chef and restaurateur
- Peter Ladner (born 1949), Vancouver city councillor
- Rose Diane Ladner, birth name of Diane Ladd, American actress
- Richard E. Ladner (born 1943), American computer scientist
- Timmy Ladner (born 1963), American politician
- Trish Ladner, American politician
- Wendell Ladner (1948–1975), American basketball player
- William Henry Ladner (1826–1907), English-born miner, farmer and political figure in British Columbia
