= Ladner =

Ladner may refer to:

== Places ==
- Ladner, British Columbia, Canada, a suburb of Vancouver
  - Canadian Forces Station Ladner, former name of the Boundary Bay Airport in British Columbia
  - Canadian Forces Station Ladner, former military airport
  - Ladner Elementary School, British Columbia
  - Ladner Leisure Centre, a recreation centre located in Delta, British Columbia
- Ladner, South Dakota, United States, an unincorporated community

== People ==
- Ladner (surname)

== Fiction ==
- A sleepy community that is the fictional setting of the television series Impastor

== See also ==
- Borden Ladner Gervais, Canadian law firm
