= Aymen Abdennour =

Tunisian professional footballer

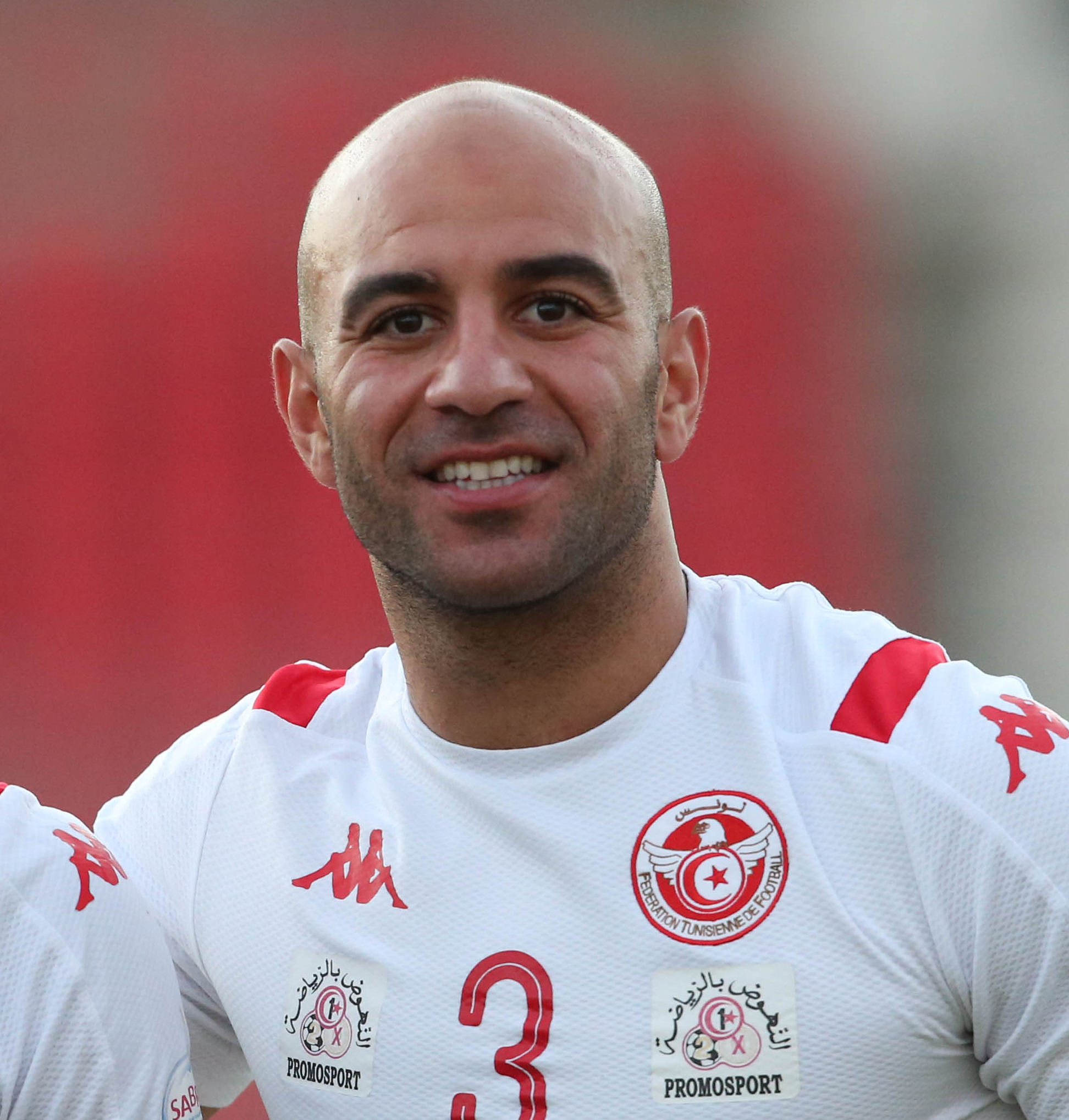
- Abdennour with Tunisia in 2018

Personal information
- Date of birth: 6 August 1989 (age 37)
- Place of birth: Sousse, Tunisia
- Height: 1.88 m (6 ft 2 in)
- Position: Centre back

Youth career
- 2007–2008: Étoile du Sahel

Senior career*
Years	Team	Apps	(Gls)
2008–2011	Étoile du Sahel	53	(10)
2010	→ Werder Bremen (loan)	6	(0)
2011–2014	Toulouse	77	(3)
2014	→ Monaco (loan)	6	(0)
2014–2015	Monaco	18	(0)
2015–2019	Valencia	35	(0)
2017–2019	→ Marseille (loan)	8	(0)
2019–2020	Kayserispor	12	(0)
2020–2022	Umm Salal	37	(1)
2022–2023	Rodez	7	(0)

International career^{‡}
2009–2010	Tunisia U21	3	(0)
2009–2019	Tunisia	53	(2)
- * Club domestic league appearances and goals as of 18 July 2026 ‡ National team caps and goals as of 8 January 2023

Aymen Abdennour (Arabic: أيمن عبد النور; born 6 August 1989) is a Tunisian former professional footballer who played as a centre-back.

A full international with over 53 caps since 2009, he represented Tunisia at three Africa Cup of Nations tournaments.

== Club career ==
=== Early career ===
Abdennour was born in Sousse, Tunisia, and started his career at Étoile Sportive du Sahel in 2008. During his spell there, he became the favourite player by fans despite being one of the youngest players in the team. In the 2008–09 season he scored five goals for his club, but they missed on the title and finished third.

On 14 January 2010, Abdennour signed a half-year loan deal with Werder Bremen which initially saw him stay at the club until the end of the 2009–10 season. Bremen had the contract option to sign him permanently. Abdennour made six appearances for Werder Bremen, but they did not take up the option to sign him and he returned to Étoile.

=== Toulouse ===
In July 2011, Abdennour signed a four-year contract with the Ligue 1 side Toulouse. In February 2012, Toulouse extended this, tying the Tunisian to a deal running until 2016.

=== Monaco ===
On 31 January 2014, Abdennour joined the league rivals Monaco on a loan deal. After impressing during a loan spell, he signed a four-year deal with Monaco on 4 July 2014. The 2014–15 season was a successful season for Abdennour and his team, with a third place in Ligue 1 and an elimination against Champions League finalist Juventus in the quarter final.

=== Valencia ===
In August 2015, after a good season with Monaco, Abdennour signed a five-year deal until 2020 with La Liga side Valencia CF for an undisclosed fee, mainly as a replacement to Manchester City-bound Nicolás Otamendi.

==== Loan to Marseille ====
On 29 August 2017, Abdennour returned to France to play for Marseille, on a two-year loan deal.

=== Kayserispor ===
On 11 July 2019, it was announced that following Abdennour's release from Valencia, that he would immediately join Turkish Süper Lig club Kayserispor.

==== Umm Salal ====
On 16 September 2020, Abdennour moved to Qatar to play for Umm Salal.

=== Rodez ===
On 30 August 2022, Abdennour signed for Ligue 2 club Rodez on a season-long contract.

== International career ==
His excellent domestic performances earned him a call-up to the Tunisia squad, and, as of July 2019, has won 53 caps for his country, scoring one goal.

He was also the captain of the under-21 team.

== Career statistics ==
=== International ===
As of matches played on 19 July 2019

Appearances and goals by national team and year
National team	Year	Apps	Goals
Tunisia	2008	0	0
Tunisia	2009	1	0
Tunisia	2010	1	0
Tunisia	2011	5	1
Tunisia	2012	11	0
Tunisia	2013	10	0
Tunisia	2014	6	0
Tunisia	2015	8	0
Tunisia	2016	6	1
Tunisia	2017	5	0
Total		53	2

== Honours ==
Individual

- Tunisian Footballer of the Year: 2015
- CAF Team of the Year: 2016
