= Aïssa Laïdouni =

Tunisian footballer (born 1996)

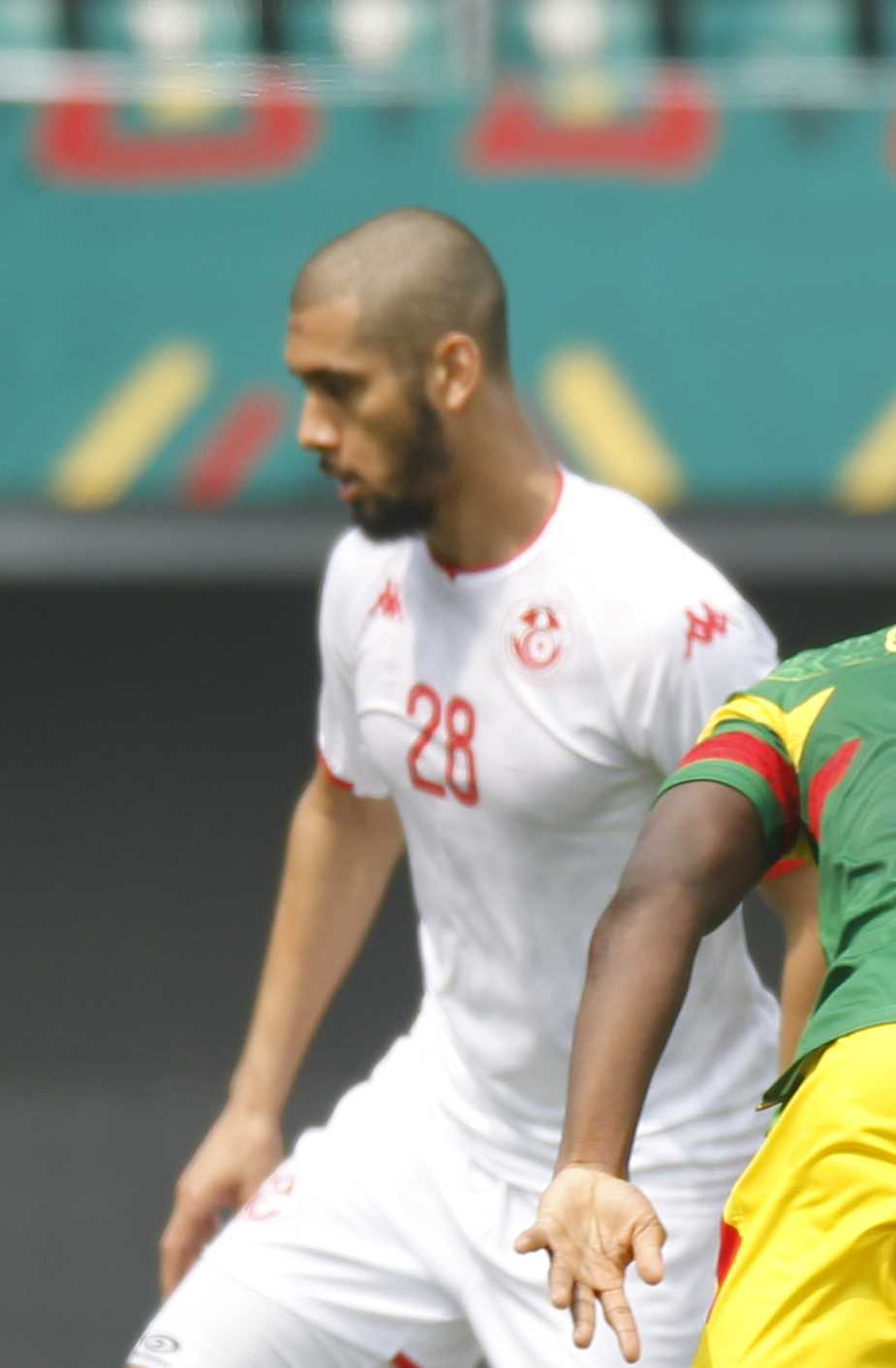
- Laïdouni in 2022

Personal information
- Full name: Aïssa Bilal Laïdouni
- Date of birth: 13 December 1996 (age 29)
- Place of birth: Montfermeil, France
- Height: 1.83 m (6 ft 0 in)
- Position: Defensive midfielder

Team information
- Current team: Al-Wakrah
- Number: 93

Youth career
- –2014: FC Montfermeil
- 2014–2016: Angers

Senior career*
Years	Team	Apps	(Gls)
2014–2017	Angers B	33	(4)
2016–2018	Angers	1	(0)
2016–2017	→ Les Herbiers (loan)	27	(1)
2017–2018	→ Chambly (loan)	18	(2)
2017–2018	→ Chambly B (loan)	2	(0)
2018–2020	Voluntari	53	(7)
2020–2023	Ferencváros	64	(6)
2023–2024	Union Berlin	37	(2)
2024–	Al-Wakrah	43	(4)

International career^{‡}
2021–	Tunisia	59	(2)
- * Club domestic league appearances and goals as of 27 September 2026 ‡ National team caps and goals as of 13 October 2025

Aïssa Bilal Laïdouni (Arabic: عِيسَى بِلَال الْعَيْدُونِيّ; born 13 December 1996) is a professional footballer who plays as a defensive midfielder for Qatari club Al-Wakrah. Born in France, he plays for the Tunisia national team.

== Club career ==
A youth exponent from the club, Laïdouni made his Ligue 1 debut with Angers on 2 April 2016 against Troyes.

On 20 April 2021, Laïdouni won the 2020–21 Nemzeti Bajnokság I season with Ferencváros by beating archrival Újpest FC 3–0 at the Groupama Arena. He wears shirt number 93, a nod to his hometown of Livry-Gargan, a commune in the northeastern suburbs of Paris, France.

On 12 July 2024, Union Berlin announced Laïdouni's transfer to Al-Wakrah in Qatar.

== International career ==
Laïdouni was born in France, to a Tunisian mother and Algerian father. He was called up to represent the senior Tunisia national team on 19 March 2021. He made his debut on 25 March 2021 in an AFCON 2021 qualifier against Libya.

== Personal life ==
Laidouni is the older brother of the Algeria youth international footballer Naïm Laidouni.

== Career statistics ==
=== Club ===
As of match played 27 September 2026

Appearances and goals by club, season and competition
Club	Season	League			National cup		League cup		Continental		Other		Total	
Club	Season	Division	Apps	Goals	Apps	Goals	Apps	Goals	Apps	Goals	Apps	Goals	Apps	Goals
Angers	2015–16	Ligue 1	1	0	—		—		—		—		1	0
Les Herbiers (loan)	2016–17	Championnat National	27	1	2	0	0	0	—		—		29	1
Chambly (loan)	2017–18	Championnat National	18	2	1	0	0	0	—		—		19	2
Voluntari	2018–19	Liga I	30	6	2	0	—		—		—		32	6
Voluntari	2019–20	Liga I	23	1	1	0	—		—		—		24	1
Voluntari	Total		53	7	3	0	—		—		—		56	7
Ferencváros	2020–21	Nemzeti Bajnokság I	27	3	3	0	—		8	0	—		38	3
Ferencváros	2021–22	Nemzeti Bajnokság I	27	3	5	0	—		9	1	—		41	4
Ferencváros	2022–23	Nemzeti Bajnokság I	10	0	0	0	—		6	2	—		16	2
Ferencváros	Total		64	6	8	0	—		23	3	—		95	9
Union Berlin	2022–23	Bundesliga	14	2	1	0	—		4	0	—		19	2
Union Berlin	2023–24	Bundesliga	23	0	2	0	—		6	0	—		31	0
Union Berlin	Total		37	2	3	0	—		10	0	—		50	2
Al-Wakrah	2024–25	Qatar Stars League	21	2	1	0	—		6	0	2	1	30	3
Al-Wakrah	2025–26	Qatar Stars League	18	1	0	0	—		—		2	0	20	1
Al-Wakrah	2026–27	Qatar Stars League	4	1	0	0	—		—		0	0	4	1
Al-Wakrah	Total		43	4	1	0	0	0	6	0	4	1	54	5
Career total			243	22	19	0	0	0	40	7	4	1	304	26

=== International ===
As of match played 13 October 2025

Appearances and goals by national team and year
National team	Year	Apps	Goals
Tunisia	2021	11	1
Tunisia	2022	17	0
Tunisia	2023	10	1
Tunisia	2024	14	0
Tunisia	2025	7	0
Total		59	2

Scores and results list Tunisia's goal tally first, score column indicates score after each Laïdouni goal.

List of international goals scored by Aïssa Laïdouni
No.	Date	Venue	Opponent	Score	Result	Competition
1.	16 November 2021	Stade Olympique Hammadi Agrebi, Radès, Tunisia	Zambia	1–0	3–1	2022 World Cup Q
2.	12 September 2023	30 June Stadium, Cairo, Egypt	Egypt	1–0	3–1	Friendly

== Honours ==
Ferencváros

- Nemzeti Bajnokság I: 2020–21; 2021–22
- Magyar Kupa: 2021–22

Tunisia

- Kirin Cup Soccer: 2022

Individual

- Nemzeti Bajnokság I Most Valuable Player: 2020–21
- Tunisian Footballer of the Year: 2022
