= Tunisian Footballer of the Year =

- Country: Tunisia
- Hosted by: Tunis Afrique Presse
- First award: Youssef Msakni (2012)
- Final award: Ali Abdi (2025)

Highlights
- Most awards: Ali Abdi; Youssef Msakni (2)
- Website: tap.info.tn

The competition for the Tunisian Footballer of the Year of the year was established by the agency Tunis Afrique Presse in 2012, via a referendum open to sports journalists, coaches and technicians, but also on its website to designate the best Tunisian footballer of the year.

== Winners ==
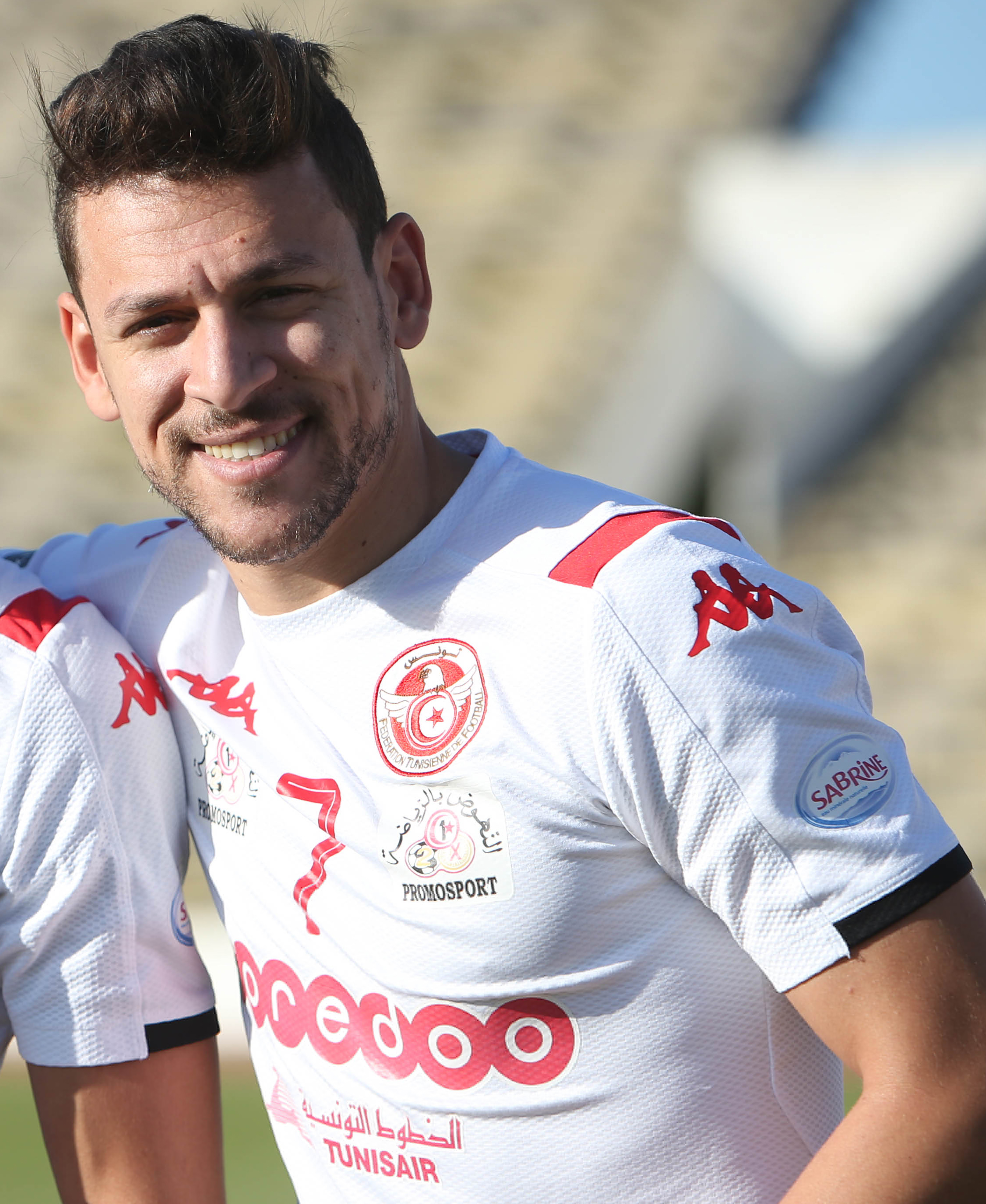
Youssef Msakni won the award in 2012 and 2017.

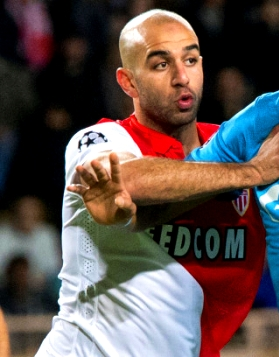
Aymen Abdennour won the award in 2015.

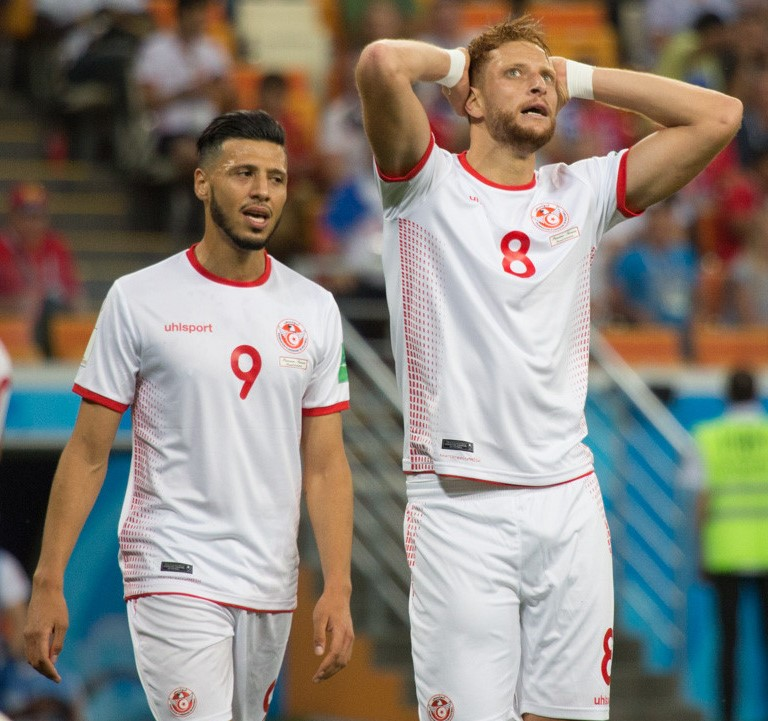
Fakhreddine Ben Youssef (right) won the award in 2013, and Anice Badri (left) in 2019.

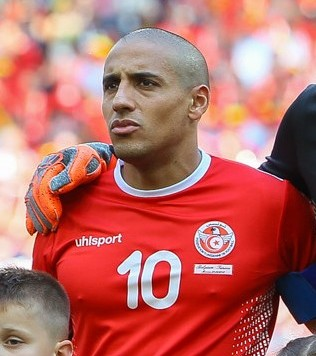
Wahbi Khazri won the award in 2018.

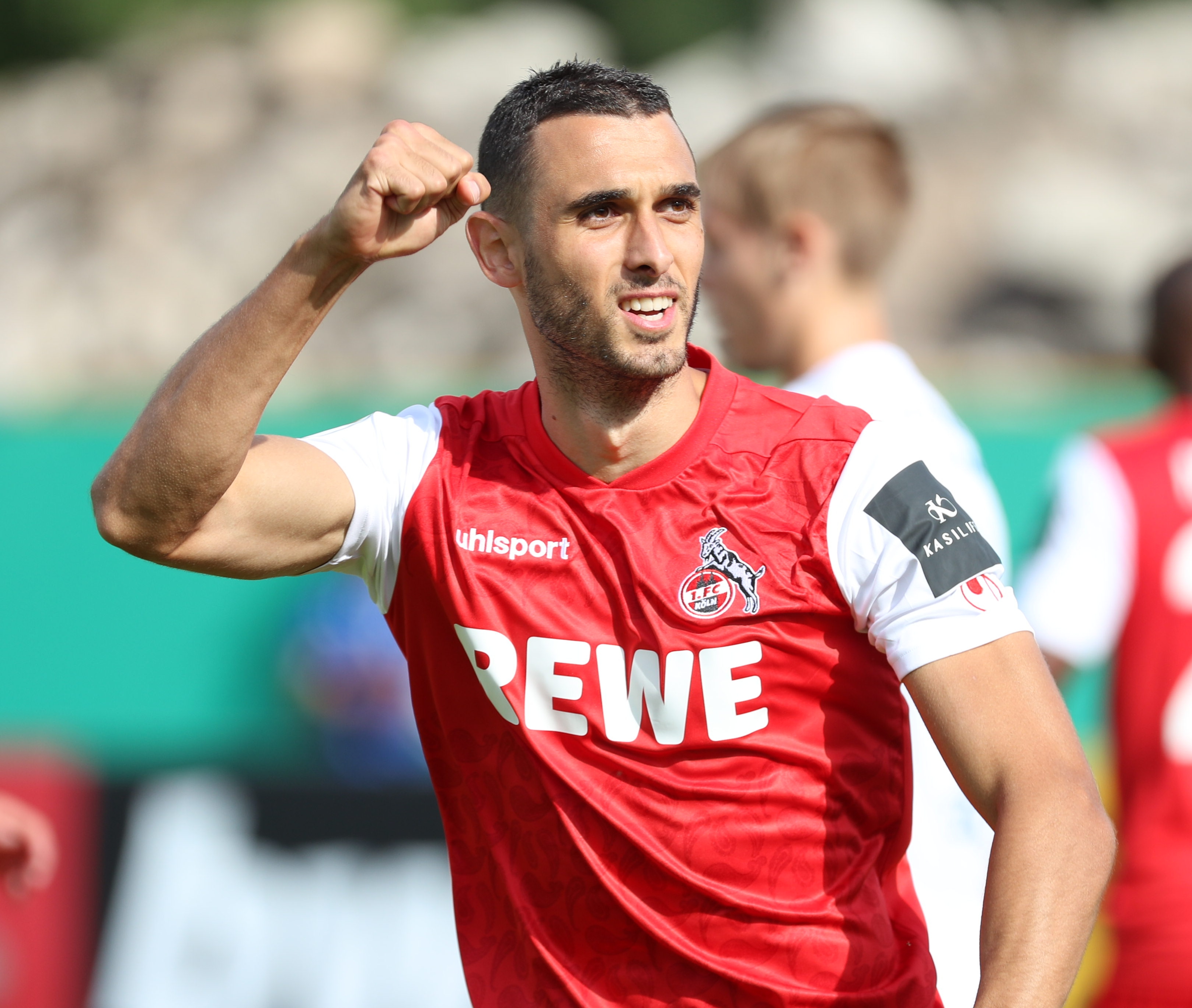
Ellyes Skhiri won the award in 2021.

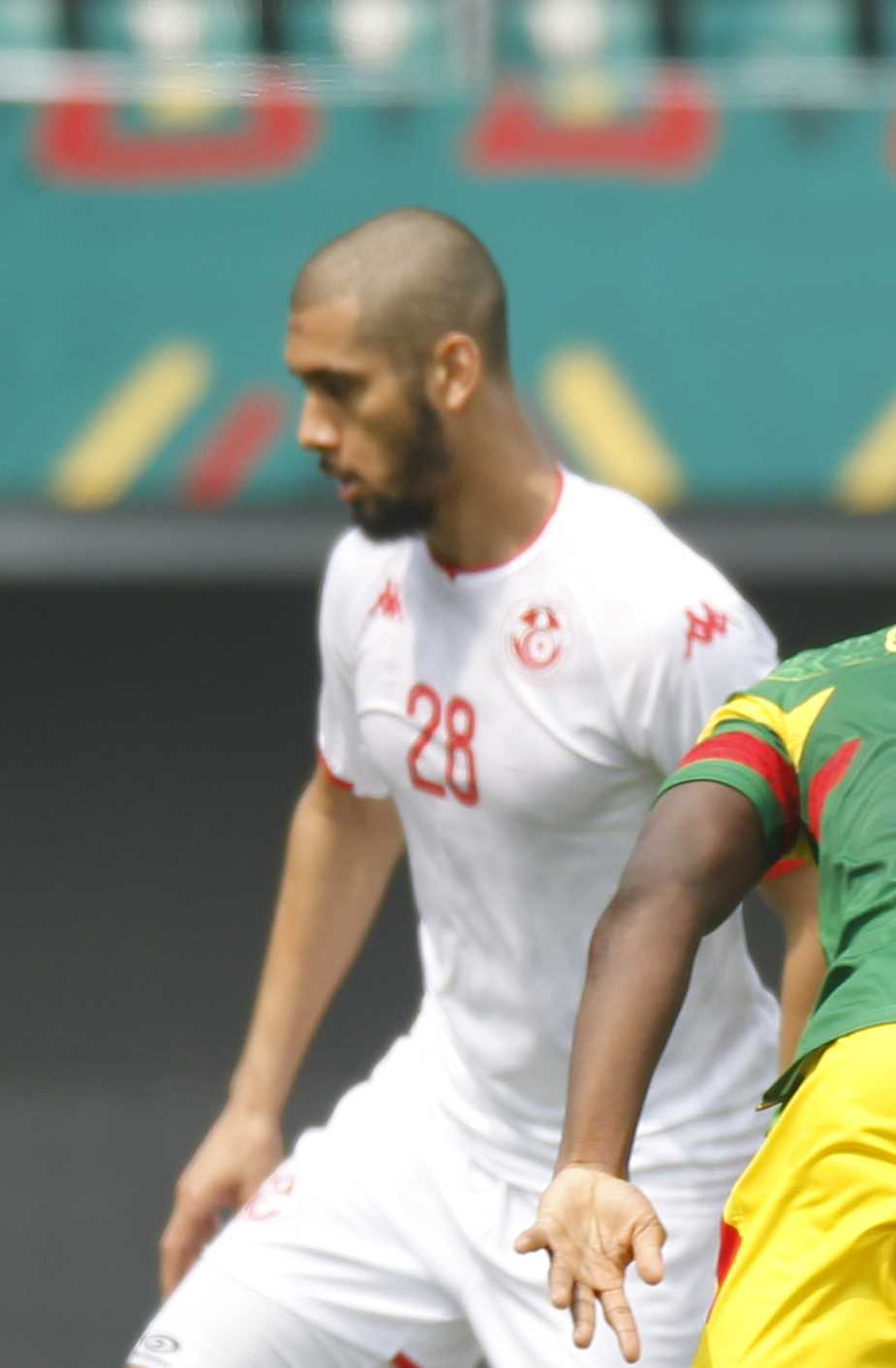
Aïssa Laïdouni won the award in 2022.

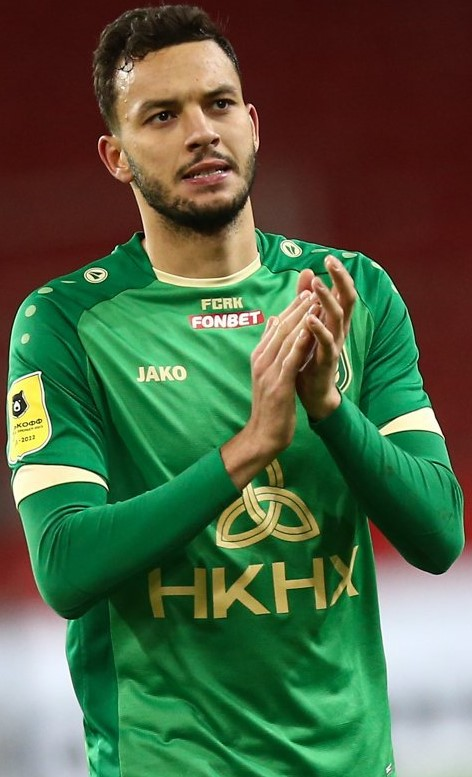
Montassar Talbi won the award in 2023.

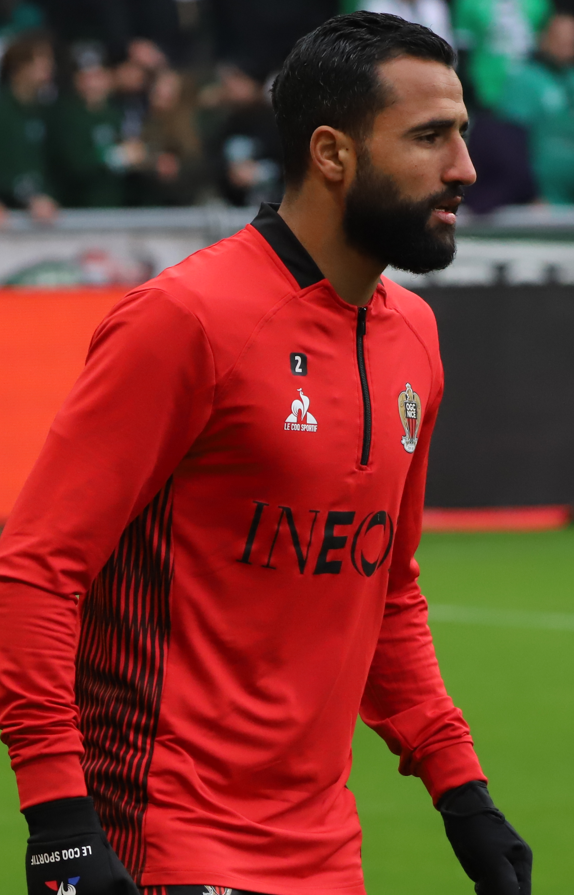
Ali Abdi won the award in 2024 and 2025.

=== By year ===
Year	Player	Club	Points
2012	Youssef Msakni	(Tunisia) Espérance Sportive de Tunis	542
2013	Fakhreddine Ben Youssef	(Tunisia) CS Sfaxien	643
2014	Yassine Chikhaoui	(Switzerland) FC Zürich	599
2015	Aymen Abdennour	(Spain) Valencia CF	945
2016	Taha Yassine Khenissi	(Tunisia) Espérance Sportive de Tunis	629
2017	Youssef Msakni (2)	(Qatar) Al-Duhail SC	731
2018	Wahbi Khazri	(France) AS Saint-Étienne	422
2019	Anice Badri	(Tunisia) Espérance Sportive de Tunis	399
2020	Cancelled due to the COVID-19 pandemic		
2021	Ellyes Skhiri	(Germany) 1. FC Köln	687
2022	Aïssa Laïdouni	(Hungary) Ferencvárosi TC	434
2023	Montassar Talbi	(France) FC Lorient	570
2024	Ali Abdi	(France) Nice	543
2025	Ali Abdi (2)	(France) Nice	466

=== Overall table ===
Year	Rank	Player	Club	Points
2012	1st	Youssef Msakni	(Tunisia) Espérance Sportive de Tunis	542
2012	2nd	Aymen Abdennour	(France) Toulouse FC	537
2012	3rd	Saber Khalifa	(France) Thonon Évian F.C.	382
2012	4th	Chadi Hammami	(Tunisia) CS Sfaxien	280
2013	1st	Fakhreddine Ben Youssef	(Tunisia) CS Sfaxien	643
2013	2nd	Ahmed Akaïchi	(Tunisia) Espérance Sportive de Tunis	?
2013	3rd	Edem Rjaïbi	(Tunisia) CA Bizertin	?
2013	4th	Ferjani sassi	(Tunisia) CS Sfaxien	?
2013	5th	Alaya Brigui	(Tunisia) Étoile Sportive du Sahel	?
2014	1st	Yassine Chikhaoui	(Switzerland) FC Zürich	599
2014	2nd	Fakhreddine Ben Youssef	(Tunisia) CS Sfaxien	590
2014	3rd	Ferjani sassi	(Tunisia) CS Sfaxien	583
2014	4th	Wahbi Khazri	(France) FC Girondins de Bordeaux	553
2014	5th	Hocine Ragued	(Tunisia) Espérance Sportive de Tunis	339
2015	1st	Aymen Abdennour	(Spain) Valencia CF	945
2015	2nd	Aymen Mathlouthi	(Tunisia) Étoile Sportive du Sahel	791
2015	3rd	Saber Khalifa	(Tunisia) Club Africain	636
2015	4th	Ali Maâloul	(Tunisia) CS Sfaxien	553
2015	5th	Saad Bguir	(Tunisia) Espérance Sportive de Tunis	519
2016	1st	Taha Yassine Khenissi	(Tunisia) Espérance Sportive de Tunis	629
2016	2nd	Hamza Lahmar	(Tunisia) Étoile Sportive du Sahel	622
2016	3rd	Mohamed Amine Ben Amor	(Tunisia) Étoile Sportive du Sahel	594
2016	4th	Saber Khalifa	(Tunisia) Club Africain	360
2016	5th	Ali Maâloul	(Egypt) Al Ahly SC	277
2017	1st	Youssef Msakni	(Qatar) Al-Duhail SC	731
2017	2nd	Ali Maâloul	(Egypt) Al Ahly SC	646
2017	3rd	Taha Yassine Khenissi	(Tunisia) Espérance Sportive de Tunis	452
2017	4th	Mohamed Amine Ben Amor	(Tunisia) Étoile Sportive du Sahel	423
2017	5th	Yassine Meriah	(Tunisia) CS Sfaxien	343
2018	1st	Wahbi Khazri	(France) AS Saint-Étienne	422
2018	2nd	Anice Badri	(Tunisia) Espérance Sportive de Tunis	407
2018	3rd	Naïm Sliti	(France) Dijon FCO	392
2018	4th	Firas Chaouat	(Tunisia) CS Sfaxien	270
2018	5th	Mohamed Amine Ben Amor	(Saudi Arabia) Al-Ahli Saudi FC	260
2019	1st	Anice Badri	(Tunisia) Espérance Sportive de Tunis	399
2019	2nd	Wahbi Khazri	(France) AS Saint-Étienne	355
2019	3rd	Yassine Chamakhi	(Tunisia) Club Africain	280
2019	4th	Ellyes Skhiri	(France) Montpellier HSC	238
2019	5th	Wajdi Kechrida	(Tunisia) Étoile Sportive du Sahel	197
2020	Cancelled due to the COVID-19 pandemic			
2021	1st	Ellyes Skhiri	(Germany) 1. FC Köln	687
2021	2nd	Wahbi Khazri	(France) AS Saint-Étienne	483
2021	3rd	Ali Maâloul	(Egypt) Al Ahly SC	441
2021	4th	Aïssa Laïdouni	(Hungary) Ferencvárosi TC	331
2021	5th	Mohamed Ali Ben Romdhane	(Tunisia) Espérance Sportive de Tunis	325
2022	1st	Aïssa Laïdouni	(Hungary) Ferencvárosi TC	434
2022	2nd	Ellyes Skhiri	(Germany) 1. FC Köln	379
2022	3rd	Mohamed Ali Ben Romdhane	(Tunisia) Espérance Sportive de Tunis	290
2023	1st	Montassar Talbi	(France) FC Lorient	570
2023	2nd	Aïssa Laïdouni	(Germany) 1. FC Union Berlin	522
2023	3rd	Ellyes Skhiri	(Germany) Eintracht Frankfurt	503
2024	1st	Ali Abdi	(France) Nice	543
2024	2nd	Amenallah Memmiche	(Tunisia) Espérance Sportive de Tunis	332
2024	3rd	Hamza Mathlouthi	(Egypt) Zamalek	319
2025	1st	Ali Abdi	(France) Nice	466
2025	2nd	Hannibal Mejbri	(England) Burnley	458
2025	3rd	Montassar Talbi	(France) FC Lorient	341

== Breakdown of winners ==
=== Winners by league ===
Rank	League	Number of wins	Winning years
1	(Tunisia) Pro League 1	4	2012, 2013, 2016, 2019
2	(France) Ligue 1	4	2018, 2023, 2024, 2025
3	(Spain) La Liga	1	2015
4	(Switzerland) Swiss Super League	1	2014
5	Qatar Stars League	1	2017
6	(Germany) Bundesliga	1	2021
7	(Hungary) Nemzeti Bajnokság I	1	2022

=== Winners by club ===
Rank	club	Number of wins	Winning years
1	(Tunisia) Espérance de Tunis	3	2012, 2016, 2019
2	(France) Nice	2	2024, 2025
3	(Tunisia) CS Sfaxien	1	2013
4	(Switzerland) FC Zürich	1	2014
5	(Spain) Valencia CF	1	2015
6	(Tunisia) Étoile du Sahel	1	2016
7	(Qatar) Al-Duhail SC	1	2017
8	(France) AS Saint-Étienne	1	2018
9	(Germany) 1. FC Köln	1	2021
10	(Hungary) Ferencvárosi TC	1	2022
11	(France) FC Lorient	1	2023
