= 2020–21 Ferencvárosi TC season =

Ferencváros
2020–21 season
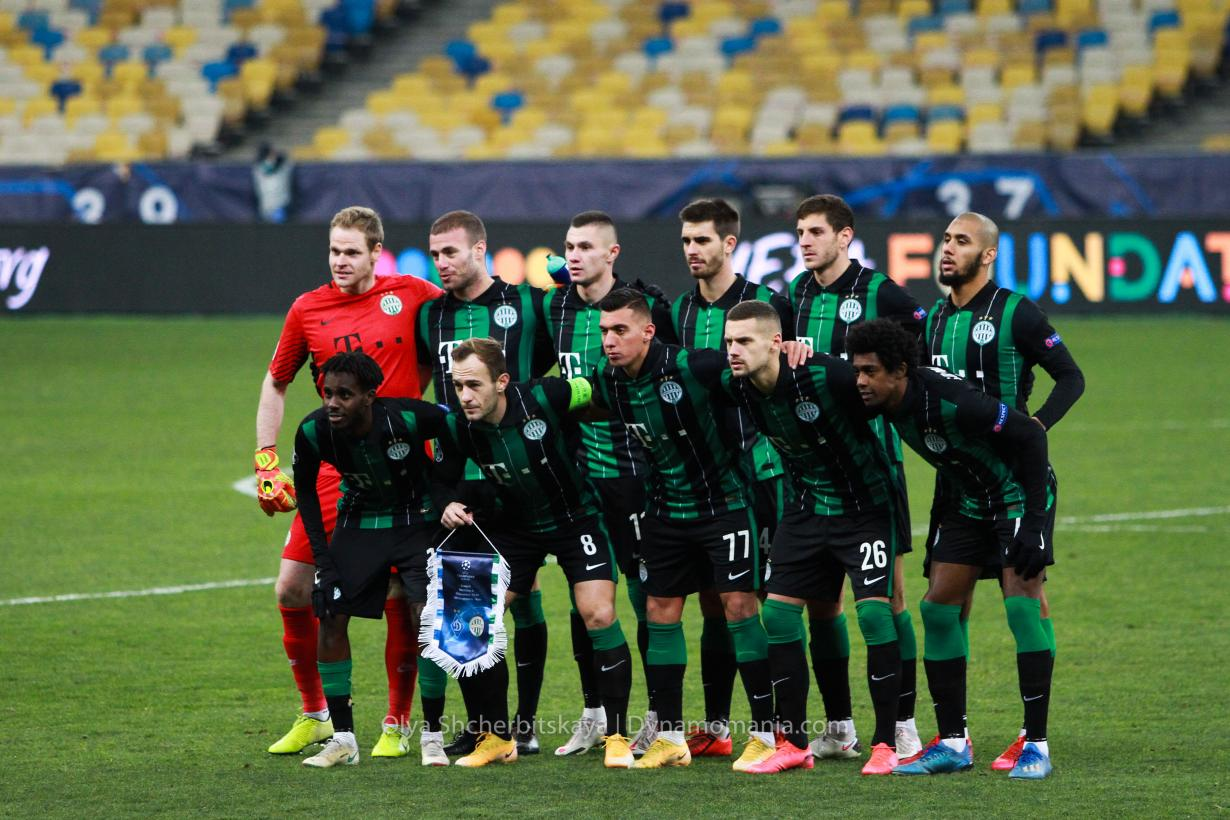
- Chairman: Gábor Kubatov
- Manager: Serhii Rebrov
- Stadium: Groupama Arena
- Nemzeti Bajnokság I: 1st
- Hungarian Cup: Round of 16
- UEFA Champions League: Group stage
- Top goalscorer: League: Myrto Uzuni (12); All: Tokmac Nguen (15)

The 2020–21 Ferencvárosi TC season was the club's 122nd season in existence and the 12th consecutive season in the top flight of Hungarian football. In addition to the domestic league, Ferencváros participated in this season's editions of the Hungarian Cup and the UEFA Champions League. The season covers the period from July 1 2020 to 30 June 2021.

== Players ==
=== First-team squad ===
As of 4 August 2020.

Note: Flags indicate national team as defined under FIFA eligibility rules; some limited exceptions apply. Players may hold more than one non-FIFA nationality.

No.	Pos.	Nation	Player
1	GK	HUN	Gergő Szécsi
5	DF	GHA	Abraham Frimpong
7	MF	BRA	Somália
8	DF	HUN	Gergő Lovrencsics (captain)
10	FW	NOR	Tokmac Nguen
11	MF	UKR	Oleksandr Zubkov
13	FW	SYR	Ammar Ramadan
14	MF	UKR	Ihor Kharatin
15	DF	BIH	Adnan Kovačević
17	DF	BIH	Eldar Ćivić
18	MF	HUN	Dávid Sigér
19	MF	HUN	Bálint Vécsei
20	FW	BLR	Mikalay Signevich
21	DF	HUN	Endre Botka
23	MF	HUN	Lukács Bőle

No.	Pos.	Nation	Player
25	DF	SVN	Miha Blažič
26	DF	GER	Marcel Heister
33	DF	GEO	Lasha Dvali
50	GK	HUN	Ádám Bogdán
51	MF	HUN	András Csonka
53	DF	HUN	Dominik Csontos
70	FW	CIV	Franck Boli
88	FW	BRA	Isael
90	GK	HUN	Dénes Dibusz (vice-captain)
92	MF	SVK	Michal Škvarka
93	MF	FRA	Aïssa Laïdouni
97	FW	HUN	Roland Varga
99	GK	HUN	Dávid Gróf
—	FW	ALB	Myrto Uzuni
—	FW	CRO	Roko Baturina

== Transfers ==
=== In ===
No.	Pos	Player	Transferred from	Fee	Date	Source
50	GK	(Hungary) Ádám Bogdán	(Scotland) Hibernian FC	Free	1 July 2020	
11	MF	(Ukraine) Oleksandr Zubkov	(Ukraine) Shakhtar Donetsk	€1,000,000	1 July 2020	
	FW	(Albania) Myrto Uzuni	(Croatia) NK Lokomotiva	€1,800,000	17 July 2020	
93	MF	(France) Aïssa Laïdouni	(Romania) FC Voluntari	€600,000	24 July 2020	
15	DF	(Bosnia and Herzegovina) Adnan Kovačević	(Poland) Korona Kielce	Free	27 July 2020	
	FW	(Croatia) Roko Baturina	(Croatia) Dinamo Zagreb	€1,000,000	3 August 2020	

=== Out ===
No.	Pos	Player	Transferred to	Fee	Date	Source
10	FW	(Italy) Davide Lanzafame	(Hungary) Budapest Honvéd	€700,000	1 July 2020	
22	DF	(Hungary) Kenny Otigba		Free	1 July 2020	
	DF	(Hungary) Erik Silye	(Hungary) Vasas SC		28 July 2020	

=== Loan out ===
No.	Pos	Player	Loaned to	Date	Source
	MF	(Hungary) Kornél Csernik	(Hungary) Soroksár SC	1 July 2020	
	DF	(Hungary) Zsombor Takács	(Hungary) Soroksár SC	1 July 2020	
	FW	(Hungary) Krisztofer Szerető	(Hungary) Soroksár SC	1 July 2020	
	FW	(Hungary) Regő Szánthó	(Hungary) Zalaegerszeg TE	26 July 2020	
	GK	(Hungary) Ádám Varga	(Hungary) Soroksár SC	27 July 2020	

== Pre–season and friendlies ==
Win Draw Loss Fixtures

21 July 2020 Friendly	Ferencváros (Hungary)	2–2	(Hungary) Haladás	Bad Radkersburg, Austria
17:00 CEST	Szánthó 21'; Ramadan 91'	Report	Kiss 43'; Jancsó 75'	Stadium: Sportplatz Radkersburg; Attendance: 0

22 July 2020 Friendly	Ferencváros (Hungary)	9–0	(Czech Republic) Frýdek-Místek	Bad Radkersburg, Austria
	Ramadan 26'; Boli 46', 56', 78'; Szánthó 60', 66', 75'; Nguen 64', 83'	Report		Stadium: Sportplatz Radkersburg; Attendance: 0

26 July 2020 Friendly	Ferencváros (Hungary)	4–0	(Slovenia) Brežice	Gornja Radgona, Slovenia
17:00 CEST	Nguen 17'; Katona 31'; Škvarka 50'; Signevich 88'	Report		Stadium: TRC Trate; Attendance: 0

27 July 2020 Friendly	Ferencváros (Hungary)	2–2	(Slovenia) Drava Ptuj	Gornja Radgona, Slovenia
11:00 CEST	Miha Blažič 3'; Signevich 67'	Report	Kačinari 11'; Bah 39'	Stadium: TRC Trate; Attendance: 0

4 August 2020 Friendly	Ferencváros (Hungary)	1–1	(Slovenia) Tabor Sežana	Bakovci, Slovenia
11:00 CEST	Sigér 58'	Report	Stančič 35'	Stadium: ŠRC Bakovci; Attendance: 0

5 August 2020 Friendly	Ferencváros (Hungary)	2–0	(Slovenia) Koper	Bad Radkersburg, Austria
11:00 CEST	Boli 55'; Sigér 62'	Report		Stadium: Sportplatz Radkersburg; Attendance: 0

9 August 2020 Friendly	Ferencváros (Hungary)	1–0	(Austria) Sturm Graz	Bad Radkersburg, Austria
	Varga 53'	Report		Stadium: Sportplatz Radkersburg; Attendance: 0

== Competitions ==
=== Overview ===
Competition	First match	Last match	Starting round	Final position	Record							
Competition	First match	Last match	Starting round	Final position	Pld	W	D	L	GF	GA	GD	Win %
Nemzeti Bajnokság I	14 August 2020	8 May 2021	Matchday 1	winner	33	23	9	1	69	22	+47	69.70
Hungarian Cup	19 September 2020	24 February 2021	Round 6	round of 16	4	3	0	1	14	4	+10	75.00
UEFA Champions League	19 August 2020	8 December 2020	First qualifying round	Group stage	11	3	3	5	14	22	−8	27.27
Total					48	29	12	7	97	48	+49	60.42

Last updated: 8 December 2020
Source: Competitions

=== Nemzeti Bajnokság I ===
==== League table ====
Pos	Team	Pld	W	D	L	GF	GA	GD	Pts	Qualification or relegation
1	Ferencváros (C)	33	23	9	1	69	22	+47	78	Qualification for the Champions League first qualifying round
2	Puskás Akadémia	33	18	4	11	52	42	+10	58	Qualification for the Europa Conference League first qualifying round
3	Fehérvár	33	16	8	9	68	38	+30	56	Qualification for the Europa Conference League first qualifying round
4	Paks	33	14	8	11	76	64	+12	50	
5	Kisvárda	33	12	10	11	30	36	−6	46	

Source: Hungarian Football Federation (in Hungarian), Soccerway
Rules for classification: 1) Points; 2) Matches won; 3) Goal difference; 4) Goals scored; 5) Head-to-head points; 6) Head-to-head goal difference; 7) Head-to-head away goals scored; 8) Fair play ranking; 9) Drawing of lots.
(C) Champions

==== Results summary ====
Overall								Home						Away					
Pld	W	D	L	GF	GA	GD	Pts	W	D	L	GF	GA	GD	W	D	L	GF	GA	GD
33	23	9	1	69	22	+47	78	13	2	1	34	8	+26	10	7	0	35	14	+21

Last updated: 8 May 2021.
Source: Soccerway

==== Results by round ====
Round	1	2	3	4	5	6	7	8	9	10	11	12	13	14	15	16	17	18	19	20	21	22	23	24	25	26	27	28	29	30	31	32	33
Ground	A	H	A	H	A	H	A	H	A	H	A	H	A	H	A	H	A	H	A	H	A	H	A	H	A	H	A	H	A	H	A	H	A
Result	D	L	W	W	W	W	W	W	D	W	W	W	W	W	W	W	D	D	W	W	D	W	D	W	D	W	W	D	D	W	W	W	W
Position	6	8	5	2	2	2	1	1	1	1	1	1	1	1	1	1	1	1	1	1	1	1	1	1	1	1	1	1	1	1	1	1	1

Updated to match(es) played on 8 May 2021. Source: Matches
A = Away; H = Home; W = Win; D = Draw; L = Loss

==== Matches ====
14 August 2020 1	MTK Budapest	1–1	Ferencváros	Budapest
18:15 CEST	Gera 37'	Report	Nguen 59'	Stadium: Hidegkuti Nándor Stadion; Attendance: 4,445; Referee: Péter Solymosi

22 August 2020 2	Ferencváros	v	Diósgyőr	Budapest
12:45 CEST				Stadium: Groupama Arena
Note: Postponed to 31 December 2020 due to Ferencváros' involvement in 2020–21 UEFA Champions League

30 August 2020 3	Zalaegerszeg	1–2	Ferencváros	Zalaegerszeg
17:45 CEST	Babati 83'	Report	Ćivić 40'; Kharatin 53'	Stadium: ZTE Arena; Attendance: 8,429; Referee: Csaba Pintér

11 September 2020 4	Ferencváros	5 – 0	Paks	Budapest
20:00 CEST	Nguen 1', 20', 28'; Boli 47', 90+2'	Report		Stadium: Groupama Arena; Attendance: 7,021; Referee: Sándor Andó-Szabó

27 January 2021 5	Budafok	v	Ferencváros	Budafok
CET				Stadium: Promontor utcai Stadion
Note: Postponed to 27 January 2021 due to Ferencváros' involvement in 2020–21 UEFA Champions League

4 October 2020 6	Ferencváros	2 – 1	Puskás Akadémia	Budapest
17:30 CEST	Isael 43', 50'	Report	Nunes 4'	Stadium: Groupama Arena; Attendance: 8,759; Referee: Ferenc Karakó

16 October 2020 7	Kisvárda	0 – 2	Ferencváros	Kisvárda
CET		Report	Isael 67'; Karasyuk 89' (o.g.)	Stadium: Várkerti Stadion; Attendance: 3,122; Referee: Balázs Berke

24 October 2020 8	Ferencváros	2 – 0	Újpest	Budapest
19:30 CET	Nguen 39'; Somália 61'	Report		Stadium: Groupama Arena; Attendance: 15,789; Referee: Gergő Bogár

31 October 2020 9	Fehérvár	1 – 1	Ferencváros	Székesfehérvár
19:30 CET	Nikolić 55' (pen.)	Report	Somália 43'	Stadium: MOL Aréna Sóstó; Attendance: 7,229; Referee: Ferenc Karakó

8 November 2020 10	Ferencváros	3 – 0	Mezőkövesd	Budapest
17:00 CET	Nguen 15'; Boli 20'; Uzuni 46'	Report		Stadium: Groupama Arena; Attendance: 2,921; Referee: Zoltán Iványi

21 November 2020 11	Budapest Honvéd	0 – 1	Ferencváros	Budapest
19:30 CET		Report	Heister 27'	Stadium: Hidegkuti Nándor Stadion; Attendance: no spectators Referee: Péter Solymosi

28 November 2020 12	Ferencváros	2 – 0	MTK Budapest	Ferencváros
19:30 CET	Nguen 40'; Baturina 75'	Report		Stadium: Groupama Arena; Attendance: 0 Referee: Péter Antal

5 December 2020 13	Diósgyőr	1 – 3	Ferencváros	Diósgyőr
17:00 CET	Rui Pedro 15' (pen.)	Report	Baturina 6'; Zubkov 19'; Uzuni 66'	Stadium: DVTK Stadium; Attendance: 0 Referee: Sándor Andó-Szabó

12 December 2020 14	Ferencváros	2 – 0	Zalaegerszeg	Ferencváros
17:00 CET	Laïdouni 68'; Baturina 70'	Report		Stadium: Groupama Arena; Attendance: 0 Referee: Mihály Káprály

16 December 2020 15	Paks	1 – 3	Ferencváros	Paks
20:15 CET	Szabó 43'	Report	Frimpong 3'; Kharatin 50'; Isael 85'	Stadium: Fehérvári úti Stadion; Attendance: 0 Referee: Balázs Berke

19 December 2020 16	Ferencváros	2 – 1	Budafok	Ferencváros
19:30 CET	Lovrencsics 57'; Kharatin 62' (pen.)	Report	Zsóri 75'	Stadium: Groupama Arena; Attendance: 0 Referee: Péter Solymosi

20 January 2021 2	Ferencváros	0 – 1	Diósgyőr	Ferencváros
20:00 CET	Dvali (yellow card) 55'; Uzuni (yellow card) 90+3'	Report	Márkvárt (yellow card) 39'; Suljić 84'; Živulić (yellow card) 90+3'	Stadium: Groupama Arena; Attendance: 0 Referee: (Hungary) Csaba Pinter
Note: COVID-19 pandemic in Hungary

23 January 2021 17	Puskás	1 – 1	Ferencváros	Felcsút
17:00 CET	Kiss (yellow card) 21'; Slagveer 43'; Urblík (yellow card) 73'; Nagy (yellow card) 73'	Report	Heister (yellow card) 45+1'; Botka (yellow card) 59'; Isael (yellow card) 72'; Uzuni 81'	Stadium: Pancho Aréna; Attendance: 0 Referee: (Hungary) Peter Antal
Note: COVID-19 pandemic in Hungary

27 January 2021 5	Budafoki MTE	0 – 3	Ferencváros	Budapest
20:00 CET	Flikor (yellow card) 37'; Zeke (yellow card) 66'	Report	Uzuni 25' (pen.); Kharatin (yellow card) 32' (goal) 67' (pen.); Sigér (yellow card) 36'; Csontos 58'	Stadium: Promontor utcai Stadion; Attendance: 0 Referee: (Hungary) Zoltan Ivanyi
Note: COVID-19 pandemic in Hungary

30 January 2021 18	Ferencváros	1 – 1	Kisvárda	Budapest
17:00 CET	Uzuni 59'	Report	Jelena 40'; Prenga (yellow card) 71'; Fernando Viana (yellow card) 90+3'	Stadium: Groupama Arena; Attendance: 0 Referee: (Hungary) Balazs Berke
Note: COVID-19 pandemic in Hungary

3 February 2021 19	Újpest	0 – 4	Ferencváros	Budapest
20:00 CET	Koutroumpis (yellow card) 5'; Tallo (yellow card) 25'; Kastrati (yellow card) 81'	Report	Isael 24'; Tallo 47' (o.g.); Uzuni 76'; Vécsei 90'	Stadium: Szusza Ferenc Stadion; Attendance: 0 Referee: (Hungary) Zoltan Ivanyi
Note: COVID-19 pandemic in Hungary

7 February 2021 20	Ferencváros	2 – 0	Fehérvár	Budapest
18:30 CET	Uzuni 11' (yellow card) 22'; Nguen 61'; Kharatin (yellow card) 64'	Report	Fiola (yellow card) 3'; Rus (yellow card) 17' (yellow-red card) 69'	Stadium: Groupama Arena; Attendance: 0 Referee: (Hungary) Balazs Berke
Note: COVID-19 pandemic in Hungary

14 February 2021 21	Mezőkövesdi SE	2 – 2	Ferencváros	Mezőkövesd
14:30 CET	Beširović 62'; Jurina 74'	Report	Boli (yellow card) 9' (goal) 50'; Somália 32'; Ćivić (yellow card) 51'; Blažič (yellow card) 70'	Stadium: Mezőkövesdi Városi Stadion; Attendance: 0 Referee: (Hungary) Sandor Ando-Szabo
Note: COVID-19 pandemic in Hungary

20 February 2021 22	Ferencváros	1 – 0	Honvéd	Budapest
19:30 CET	Laïdouni (yellow card) 4'; Lovrencsics (yellow card) 21'; Uzuni 56'	Report	Zsótér (yellow card) 31'; Gazdag (yellow card) 45'; Batik (yellow card) 90'	Stadium: Groupama Arena; Attendance: 0 Referee: (Hungary) Adam Farkas
Note: COVID-19 pandemic in Hungary

27 February 2021 23	MTK	2 – 2	Ferencváros	Budapest
19:30 CET	Miovski (yellow card) 50'; Nagy 55'; Varga 60' (pen.); Herrera (yellow card) 70'; Mezei (yellow card) 81'	Report	Zubkov 1' 23'; Sigér (yellow card) 44'; Mmaee (yellow card) 54'; Ćivić (yellow card) 64'; Laïdouni (yellow card) 88'	Stadium: Hidegkuti Nándor Stadion; Attendance: 0 Referee: (Hungary) Gergő Bogár
Note: COVID-19 pandemic in Hungary

2 March 2021 24	Ferencváros	1 – 0	Diósgyőr	Budapest
20:00 CET	Boli 77'; Laïdouni (yellow card) 84'	Report	Milović (yellow card) 59'; Márkvárt (yellow card) 68'; Hegedűs (yellow card) 90'	Stadium: Groupama Arena; Attendance: 0 Referee: (Hungary) Balazs Berke
Note: COVID-19 pandemic in Hungary

7 March 2021 25	Zalaegerszegi TE	2 – 2	Ferencváros	Zalaegerszeg
18:00 CET	Koszta 7'; Tanasin (yellow card) 44'; Futács (yellow card) 57' (goal) 67' (pen.); Gyurján (yellow card) 84'	Report	Boli 51' 65'; Lovrencsics (yellow card) 78'	Stadium: ZTE Arena; Attendance: 0 Referee: (Hungary) Káprály Mihály
Note: COVID-19 pandemic in Hungary

14 March 2021 26	Ferencváros	5 – 2	Paksi SE	Budapest
17:00 CET	Laïdouni 22'; Uzuni 49' (pen.); Mak 62'; Boli 75'; Baturina 89'	Report	Hahn 2' (pen.); Bálint Szabó (yellow card) 43'; Gévay (yellow card) 56'; Szendrei 87'	Stadium: Groupama Arena; Attendance: 0 Referee: (Hungary) Ferenc Karakó
Note: COVID-19 pandemic in Hungary

4 April 2021 27	Budafoki MTE	0 – 4	Ferencváros	Budapest
17:00 CET	Huszti (yellow card) 54' (yellow-red card) 57'	Report	Uzuni 55' (pen.); Nguen (yellow card) 58'; Boli 61'; Isael (yellow card) 86'; Sigér 89'; Kharishvili 90'	Stadium: Promontor utcai Stadion; Attendance: 0 Referee: (Hungary) Adam Farkas
Note: COVID-19 pandemic in Hungary

10 April 2021 28	Ferencváros	1 – 1	Puskás	Budapest
19:30 CET	Laïdouni (yellow card) 65' (goal) 77'; Blažič (yellow card) 70'; Kharatin (yellow card) 90'	Report	João Nunes 7'; Knežević (yellow card) 23'; Slagveer (yellow card) 42'; van Nieff (yellow card) 51'; Spandler (yellow card) 75'	Stadium: Groupama Arena; Attendance: 0 Referee: (Hungary) Tamás Bognár
Note: COVID-19 pandemic in Hungary

17 April 2021 29	Kisvárda	0 – 0	Ferencváros	Kisvárda
17:00 CET	Laszlo Himics (yellow card) 36'; Ćirković (yellow card) 52'; Karabelyov (yellow card) 90'	Report		Stadium: Várkerti Stadion; Attendance: 0 Referee: (Hungary) Csaba Pinter
Note: COVID-19 pandemic in Hungary

20 April 2021 30	Ferencváros	3 – 0	Újpest	Budapest
20:30 CEST	Uzuni 13', 77' (pen.); Nguen 30'	Report		Stadium: Groupama Arena; Attendance: no spectators Referee: Péter Solymosi

25 April 2021 31	Fehérvár	1 – 2	Ferencváros	Székesfehérvár
17:00 CEST	Nikolić 82'	Report	Zubkov 36', 54'	Stadium: MOL Aréna Sóstó; Attendance: no spectators Referee: Sándor Andó-Szabó
Note: COVID-19 pandemic in Hungary

1 May 20121 32	Ferencváros	2 – 1	Mezőkövesd	Budapest
19:30 CEST	Nguen 24', 89'	Report	Beširović 64'	Stadium: Groupama Arena; Attendance: 3,627; Referee: Balázs Berke

8 May 2021 33	Budapest Honvéd	1 – 2	Ferencváros	Budapest
17:00 CEST	Eppel 44'	Report	Isael 83'; Boli 86'	Stadium: Hidegkuti Nándor Stadion; Attendance: 1,892; Referee: Tamás Bognár

=== Hungarian Cup ===
19 September 2020 Round 6	Ráckeve	1–6	Ferencváros	Ráckeve
13:00 CEST	Marković 86'	Report	Baturina 18', 52'; Katona 32'; Zubkov 56'; Varga 81'; Škvarka 83'	Stadium: Városi Sportpálya; Attendance: 2,000; Referee: Anikó Kiss

14 November 2020 Round 7	Bicske	0–5	Ferencváros	Bicske
14:45 CET		Report	Baturina 17', 59', 72'; Boli 62'; Škvarka 90+1'	Stadium: Városi Sportpálya; Attendance: x Referee: Gábor Oláh

10 February 2021 Round of 32	Dorogi	1–2	Ferencváros	Dorog
13:00 CET	Aron Girsik 75'	Report	Baturina 21'; Dávid Nagyházi 56' (o.g.)	Stadium: Buzánszky Jenő Stadion; Attendance: 0

24 February 2021 Round of 16	Ferencváros	1–2	Fehérvár	Budapest
17:30 CET	Stopira 13' (o.g.); Botka (yellow card) 19'; Mmaee (yellow card) 90+5'	Report	Nikolić 8' (pen.) (yellow card) 22'; Petryak (yellow card) 17'; Stopira 40'; Fiola (yellow card) 73'; Kovács (yellow card) 85'	Stadium: Groupama Aréna; Attendance: 0 Referee: (Hungary) Tamás Bognár

=== UEFA Champions League ===
19 August 2020 First qualifying round	Ferencváros (Hungary)	2–0	(Sweden) Djurgården	Budapest
19:00 CEST	Nguen 33', 62'	Report		Stadium: Groupama Arena; Attendance: 0 Referee: Fedayi San (Switzerland)

26 August 2020 Second qualifying round	Celtic (Scotland)	1–2	(Hungary) Ferencváros	Glasgow
14:45	Christie 53'	Report	Sigér 7'; Nguen 75'	Stadium: Celtic Park; Attendance: 0 Referee: Allard Lindhout (Netherlands)

16 September 2020 Third qualifying round	Ferencváros (Hungary)	2–1	(Croatia) Dinamo Zagreb	Budapest
19:00 CEST	Lovrencsics 2'; Uzuni 65'	Report	Uzuni 23' (o.g.)	Stadium: Groupama Arena; Attendance: 0 Referee: Tobias Stieler (Germany)

23 September 2020 Play-off round First leg	Molde (Norway)	3–3	(Hungary) Ferencváros	Molde
21:00 CEST	James 55'; Eikrem 65'; Ellingsen 83'	Report	Boli 7'; Uzuni 52'; Kharatin 87' (pen.)	Stadium: Aker Stadion; Attendance: 0 Referee: Carlos del Cerro Grande (Spain)

29 September 2020 Play-off round Second leg	Ferencváros (Hungary)	0–0 (3–3 (a) agg.)	(Norway) Molde	Budapest
21:00 CEST		Report		Stadium: Groupama Arena; Attendance: 0 Referee: Björn Kuipers (Netherlands)

==== Group stage ====
The group stage draw was held on 1 October 2020.

Pos	Team	Pld	W	D	L	GF	GA	GD	Pts	Qualification	JUV	BAR	DKV	FER
1	(Italy) Juventus	6	5	0	1	14	4	+10	15 (Note: Tied on head-to-head points (3). Head-to-head goal difference: Juventus +1, Barcelona –1.)	Advance to knockout phase	—	0–2	3–0	2–1
2	(Spain) Barcelona	6	5	0	1	16	5	+11	15	Advance to knockout phase	0–3	—	2–1	5–1
3	(Ukraine) Dynamo Kyiv	6	1	1	4	4	13	−9	4	Transfer to Europa League	0–2	0–4	—	1–0
4	(Hungary) Ferencváros	6	0	1	5	5	17	−12	1		1–4	0–3	2–2	—

Source: UEFA
Rules for classification: Group stage tiebreakers
Notes:

20 October 2020 1	Barcelona (Spain)	5–1	(Hungary) Ferencváros	Barcelona, Spain
21:00 CEST (UTC+2)	Messi 27' (pen.); Fati 42'; Coutinho 52'; Pedri 82'; Dembélé 89'	Report	Kharatin 70' (pen.)	Stadium: Camp Nou; Attendance: 0 Referee: Sandro Schärer (Switzerland)

28 October 2020 2	Ferencváros (Hungary)	2–2	(Ukraine) Dynamo Kyiv	Budapest, Hungary
20:00 EET (UTC+02:00)	Nguen 59'; Boli 90'	Report	Tsyhankov 28' (pen.); De Pena 41'	Stadium: Groupama Arena; Attendance: 6,171; Referee: Ivan Kružliak (Slovakia)

4 November 2020 3	Ferencváros (Hungary)	1–4	(Italy) Juventus	Budapest, Hungary
21:00 CET (UTC+1)	Boli 90'	Report	Morata 7', 60'; Dybala 73'; Dvali 81' (o.g.)	Stadium: Puskás Aréna; Attendance: 18,531; Referee: Orel Grinfeld (Israel)

24 November 2020 4	Juventus (Italy)	2–1	(Hungary) Ferencváros	Turin, Italy
21:00 CET (UTC+1)	Ronaldo 35'; Morata 90+2'	Report	Uzuni 19'	Stadium: Juventus Stadium; Attendance: 0 Referee: Daniel Siebert (Germany)

2 December 2020 5	Ferencváros (Hungary)	0–3	(Spain) Barcelona	Budapest, Hungary
21:00 CET (UTC+1)		Report	Griezmann 14'; Braithwaite 20'; Dembélé 28' (pen.)	Stadium: Puskás Aréna; Attendance: 0 Referee: Aleksei Kulbakov (Belarus)

8 December 2020 6	Dynamo Kyiv (Ukraine)	1–0	(Hungary) Ferencváros	Kyiv, Ukraine
20:00 EET (UTC+02:00)	Popov 60'	Report		Stadium: NSC Olimpiyskiy; Attendance: 0 Referee: Andreas Ekberg (Sweden)

== Statistics ==
=== Appearances and goals ===
Last updated on 9 May 2021.

No.	Pos	Nat	Player	Total		OTP Bank Liga		Champions League		Hungarian Cup	
No.	Pos	Nat	Player	Apps	Goals	Apps	Goals	Apps	Goals	Apps	Goals
1	GK	(Hungary) HUN	Ádám Bogdán	7	-5	5	-3	0	0	2	-2
3	DF	(Morocco) MAR	Samy Mmaee	11	0	9	0	0	0	2	0
5	DF	(Ghana) GHA	Abraham Frimpong	13	1	7	1	5	0	1	0
7	MF	(Brazil) BRA	Somália	36	3	24	3	11	0	1	0
8	DF	(Hungary) HUN	Gergő Lovrencsics	31	2	22	1	8	1	1	0
10	FW	(Norway) NOR	Tokmac Nguen	45	15	32	11	11	4	2	0
11	MF	(Ukraine) UKR	Oleksandr Zubkov	34	6	25	5	7	0	2	1
14	MF	(Ukraine) UKR	Ihor Kharatin	37	6	25	4	10	2	2	0
15	DF	(Bosnia and Herzegovina) BIH	Adnan Kovačević	11	0	6	0	5	0	0	0
17	DF	(Bosnia and Herzegovina) BIH	Eldar Ćivić	25	1	18	1	5	0	2	0
18	MF	(Hungary) HUN	Dávid Sigér	35	2	24	1	9	1	2	0
19	MF	(Hungary) HUN	Bálint Vécsei	17	1	14	1	0	0	3	0
20	FW	(Slovakia) SVK	Róbert Mak	26	1	19	1	5	0	2	0
21	DF	(Hungary) HUN	Endre Botka	32	0	19	0	11	0	2	0
22	FW	(Croatia) CRO	Roko Baturina	25	10	20	4	2	0	3	6
23	MF	(Hungary) HUN	Dániel Gera	8	0	7	0	0	0	1	0
25	DF	(Slovenia) SVN	Miha Blažič	36	0	24	0	11	0	1	0
26	DF	(Germany) GER	Marcel Heister	32	1	23	1	7	0	2	0
27	MF	(Georgia (country)) GEO	Giorgi Kharaishvili	5	1	4	1	0	0	1	0
29	GK	(Hungary) HUN	Gergő Szécsi	1	0	0	0	0	0	1	0
31	DF	(United States) USA	Henry Wingo	12	0	12	0	0	0	0	0
33	DF	(Georgia (country)) GEO	Lasha Dvali	27	0	21	0	6	0	0	0
51	MF	(Hungary) HUN	András Csonka	1	0	0	0	0	0	1	0
52	FW	(Hungary) HUN	Damir Redžić	2	0	2	0	0	0	0	0
53	DF	(Hungary) HUN	Dominik Csontos	4	1	1	1	0	0	3	0
70	FW	(Ivory Coast) CIV	Franck Boli	40	14	28	10	9	3	3	1
77	FW	(Albania) ALB	Myrto Uzuni	36	15	26	12	9	3	1	0
88	FW	(Brazil) BRA	Isael	40	6	28	6	10	0	2	0
90	GK	(Hungary) HUN	Dénes Dibusz	40	-43	28	-19	11	-22	1	-2
92	MF	(Slovakia) SVK	Michal Škvarka	16	2	11	0	2	0	3	2
93	MF	(France) FRA	Aïssa Laïdouni	38	3	27	3	8	0	3	0
97	FW	(Hungary) HUN	Roland Varga	6	1	4	0	1	0	1	1
Youth players:
13	MF	(Syria) SYR	Ammar Ramadan	1	0	0	0	0	0	1	0
16	DF	(Hungary) HUN	Leandro	1	0	0	0	0	0	1	0
52	MF	(Hungary) HUN	Alessio Mazzonetto	1	0	0	0	0	0	1	0
54	DF	(Hungary) HUN	Tamás Molnár	1	0	0	0	0	0	1	0
54	MF	(Hungary) HUN	Richárd Szabó	0	0	0	0	0	0	0	0
54	DF	(Hungary) HUN	Olivér Nagy	0	0	0	0	0	0	0	0
55	MF	(Hungary) HUN	Bálint Katona	2	1	0	0	0	0	2	1
56	DF	(Hungary) HUN	Levente Szabó	1	0	0	0	0	0	1	0
61	GK	(Hungary) HUN	Levente Őri	0	0	0	0	0	0	0	0
61	GK	(Hungary) HUN	Marcell Kovács	0	0	0	0	0	0	0	0

=== Top scorers ===
Includes all competitive matches. The list is sorted by shirt number when total goals are equal.

Last updated on 9 May 2021

Position	Nation	Number	Name	OTP Bank Liga	UEFA Champions League	Hungarian Cup	Total
1	(Norway)	10	Tokmac Nguen	11	4	0	15
2	(Albania)	77	Myrto Uzuni	12	3	0	15
3	(Ivory Coast)	70	Franck Boli	10	3	1	14
4	(Croatia)	22	Roko Baturina	4	0	6	10
5	(Ukraine)	14	Ihor Kharatin	4	2	0	6
6	(Brazil)	88	Isael	6	0	0	6
7	(Ukraine)	11	Oleksandr Zubkov	5	0	1	6
8	(Brazil)	7	Somália	3	0	0	3
9	(France)	93	Aïssa Laïdouni	3	0	0	3
10	(Hungary)	8	Gergő Lovrencsics	1	1	0	2
11	(Hungary)	18	Dávid Sigér	1	1	0	2
12	(Slovakia)	92	Michal Škvarka	0	0	2	2
13	(Bosnia and Herzegovina)	17	Eldar Ćivić	1	0	0	1
14	(Germany)	26	Marcel Heister	1	0	0	1
15	(Ghana)	5	Abraham Frimpong	1	0	0	1
16	(Hungary)	53	Dominik Csontos	1	0	0	1
17	(Hungary)	19	Bálint Vécsei	1	0	0	1
18	(Slovakia)	20	Róbert Mak	1	0	0	1
19	(Georgia (country))	27	Giorgi Kharaishvili	1	0	0	1
20	(Hungary)	55	Bálint Katona	0	0	1	1
21	(Hungary)	97	Roland Varga	0	0	1	1
/	/	/	Own Goals	2	0	2	4
			TOTALS	69	14	14	97

=== Disciplinary record ===
Includes all competitive matches. Players with 1 card or more included only.

Last updated on 9 May 2021

Position	Nation	Number	Name	OTP Bank Liga		UEFA Champions League		Hungarian Cup		Total (Hu Total)	
Position	Nation	Number	Name	Booked	Sent off (straight red)	Booked	Sent off (straight red)	Booked	Sent off (straight red)	Booked	Sent off (straight red)
DF	(Morocco)	3	Samy Mmaee	1	0	0	0	1	0	2 (1)	0 (0)
DF	(Ghana)	5	Abraham Frimpong	2	1	2	0	0	0	4 (2)	1 (1)
MF	(Brazil)	7	Somália	0	0	1	0	0	0	1 (0)	0 (0)
DF	(Hungary)	8	Gergő Lovrencsics	6	0	0	0	0	0	6 (6)	0 (0)
FW	(Norway)	10	Tokmac Nguen	2	0	2	0	0	0	4 (2)	0 (0)
MF	(Ukraine)	11	Oleksandr Zubkov	1	0	0	0	0	0	1 (1)	0 (0)
MF	(Ukraine)	14	Ihor Kharatin	6	0	4	0	0	0	10 (6)	0 (0)
DF	(Bosnia and Herzegovina)	15	Adnan Kovačević	0	0	2	0	0	0	2 (0)	0 (0)
DF	(Bosnia and Herzegovina)	17	Eldar Ćivić	4	0	2	0	0	0	6 (4)	0 (0)
MF	(Hungary)	18	Dávid Sigér	4	0	1	0	0	0	5 (4)	0 (0)
MF	(Slovakia)	20	Róbert Mak	2	0	0	0	0	0	2 (2)	0 (0)
DF	(Hungary)	21	Endre Botka	2	1	2	0	1	0	5 (2)	1 (1)
MF	(Hungary)	23	Dániel Gera	1	0	0	0	0	0	1 (1)	0 (0)
DF	(Slovenia)	25	Miha Blažič	4	0	3	0	0	0	7 (4)	0 (0)
DF	(Germany)	26	Marcel Heister	4	0	1	0	0	0	5 (4)	0 (0)
DF	(Georgia (country))	33	Lasha Dvali	3	0	0	0	0	0	3 (3)	0 (0)
FW	(Ivory Coast)	70	Franck Boli	3	0	1	0	0	0	4 (3)	0 (0)
FW	(Albania)	77	Myrto Uzuni	4	0	0	0	0	0	4 (4)	0 (0)
MF	(Brazil)	88	Isael	3	0	1	0	0	0	4 (3)	0 (0)
GK	(Hungary)	90	Dénes Dibusz	3	0	0	0	0	0	3 (3)	0 (0)
MF	(Slovakia)	92	Michal Škvarka	1	0	0	0	0	0	1 (1)	0 (0)
MF	(France)	93	Aïssa Laïdouni	8	0	3	0	0	0	11 (8)	0 (0)
			TOTALS	64	2	25	0	2	0	91 (64)	2 (2)

=== Overall ===
Games played	48 (33 OTP Bank Liga, 11 UEFA Champions League and 4 Hungarian Cup)
Games won	29 (23 OTP Bank Liga, 3 UEFA Champions League and 3 Hungarian Cup)
Games drawn	12 (9 OTP Bank Liga, 3 UEFA Champions League and 0 Hungarian Cup)
Games lost	7 (1 OTP Bank Liga, 5 UEFA Champions League and 1 Hungarian Cup)
Goals scored	97
Goals conceded	48
Goal difference	+49
Yellow cards	91
Red cards	2
Worst discipline	(France) Aïssa Laïdouni (10 (yellow card) , 0 (red card) )
Best result	5–0 (H) v Paks - Nemzeti Bajnokság I - 11-9-2020
Best result	6–1 (A) v Ráckeve - Hungarian Cup - 19-9-2020
Best result	5–0 (A) v Bicske - Hungarian Cup - 14-11-2020
Worst result	1–5 (A) v Barcelona - UEFA Champions League - 20-10-2020
Most appearances	(Norway) Tokmac Nguen (45 appearances)
Top scorer	(Albania) Myrto Uzuni (15 goals)
Top scorer	(Norway) Tokmac Nguen (15 goals)
Points	99/144 (68.75%)

Last updated: 9 May 2021
