= Lautner =

Lautner is an Austrian habitational surname, from any of the several places called Lauten. The name may refer to:

- Taylor Lautner, American actor, voice actor, model, and martial artist
- John Lautner (1911–1994), American architect
- Georges Lautner (1926–2013), French film director and screenwriter
- Kryštof Lautner, victim of the Northern Moravia witch trials
