= Orlando Lattmann =

Swiss footballer (born 1989)

Personal information
- Full name: Orlando Lattmann
- Date of birth: 25 August 1989 (age 37)
- Place of birth: Switzerland
- Height: 1.85 m (6 ft 1 in)
- Position: Goalkeeper

Youth career
- FC Adliswil
- 2000–2009: FC Zürich

Senior career*
Years	Team	Apps	(Gls)
2009	FC Zürich	0	(0)
2010	FC Gossau	13	(0)
2010–2011	FC Schaffhausen	11	(0)
- * Club domestic league appearances and goals as of 9 July 2011

Orlando Lattmann (born 25 August 1989) is a footballer from Switzerland who retired from professional football in 2011.

== See also ==
- Football in Switzerland
- List of football clubs in Switzerland
