= Yassine Chikhaoui =

Tunisian footballer

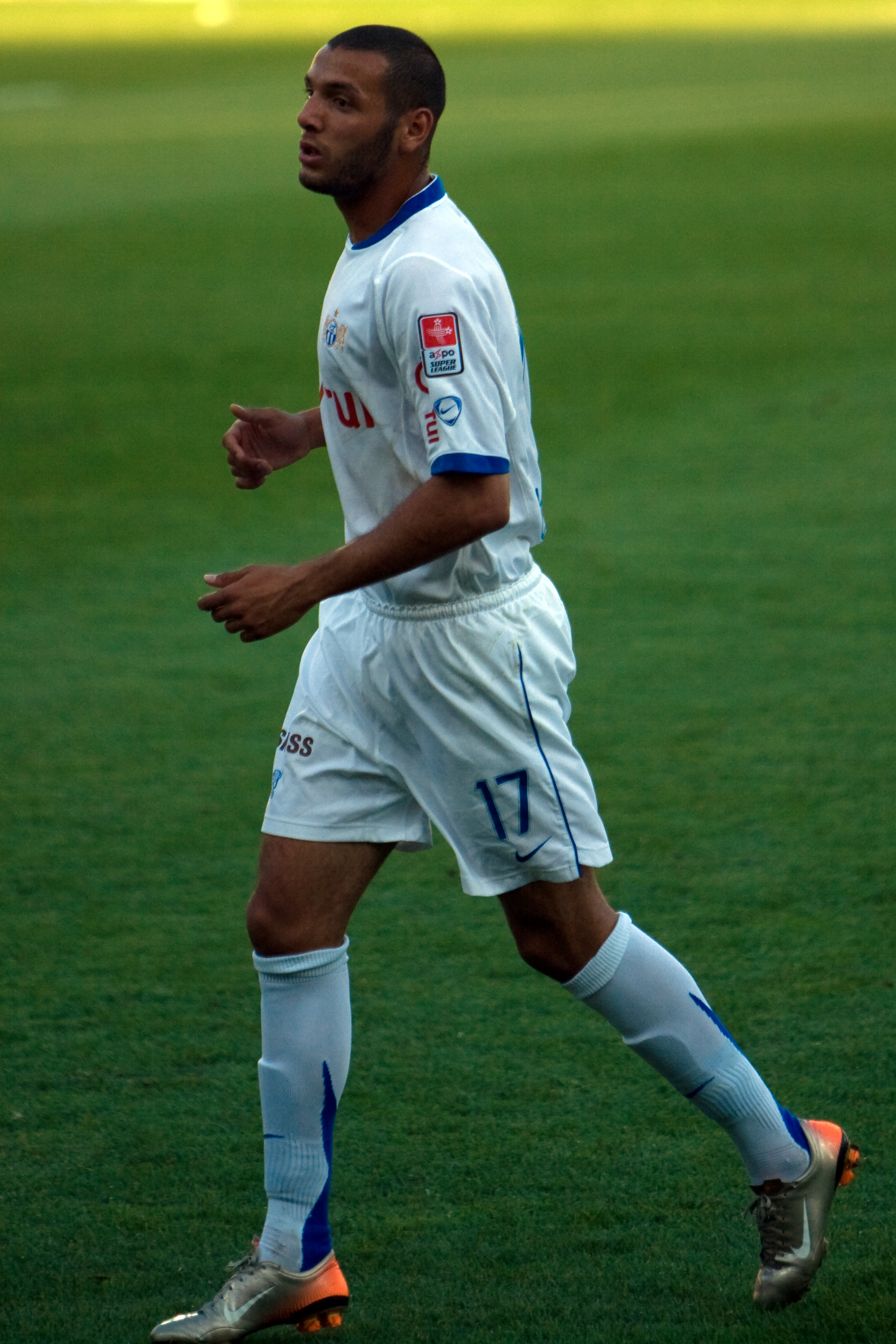
- Chikhaoui with FC Zürich in 2007

Personal information
- Full name: Yassine Chikhaoui
- Date of birth: 21 September 1986 (age 40)
- Place of birth: Radès, Tunisia
- Height: 1.89 m (6 ft 2 in)
- Position: Attacking midfielder

Youth career
- ES Radès
- Ariana
- 2002–2004: Étoile du Sahel

Senior career*
Years	Team	Apps	(Gls)
2004–2007	Étoile du Sahel	84	(14)
2007–2015	Zürich	116	(28)
2015–2017	Al-Gharafa	14	(1)
2017	→ Al-Ahli (loan)	10	(2)
2017–2018	Al-Ahli	13	(4)
2018–2023	Étoile du Sahel	35	(8)

International career^{‡}
2006–2021	Tunisia	42	(10)
Medal record
Representing Tunisia
Men's football
FIFA Arab Cup
Runner-up	2021 Qatar
- * Club domestic league appearances and goals as of 18 September 2015 ‡ National team caps and goals as of 00:00, 14 February 2017 (EST)

Yassine Chikhaoui (Arabic: يَاسِين الشَّيْخَاوِيّ; born 21 September 1986) is a former Tunisian professional footballer who last played as an attacking midfielder for Tunisian club Étoile du Sahel.

== Club career ==
=== Étoile du Sahel ===
Chikhaoui became captain of Étoile du Sahel at the age of 19. He was the youngest player to take up this role in the club.

He achieved a lot of success with Étoile du Sahel and won the CAF Champions League with them.

=== FC Zürich ===
Chikhaoui was signed by FC Zürich on a five-year contract on 23 May 2007.

During the 2008 Africa Cup of Nations, it was reported that many clubs had scouts present to watch Chikhaoui play. Unfortunately, after impressing at the African Cup of Nations he was forced to take time out to get a recurring knee problem treated. On 26 April 2009, he completed his recovery by returning to play for the Zurich first team. Weeks later he cemented his comeback with a goal and contributed, as a late substitute, to helping his team win and stay top in the title race.

He was part of the 2013–14 Swiss Cup-winning team and afterwards signed a new three-year contract until 2017. In the 2014–2015 season, he was appointed as the club's captain.

=== Al-Gharafa ===
On 3 August 2015, Chikhaoui's transfer to Al-Gharafa Sports Club was announced.

== International career ==
Chikhaoui was called up to the Tunisian national team to participate in the 2006 FIFA World Cup at the age of 19.

== Career statistics ==
Scores and results list Tunisia's goal tally first, score column indicates score after each Chikhaoui goal.

List of international goals scored by Yassine Chikhaoui
No.	Date	Venue	Opponent	Score	Result	Competition
1	6 January 2008	Stade Olympique de Radès, Radès, Tunisia	Zambia	1–2	1–2	Friendly
2	8 January 2008	Stade Olympique de Radès, Radès, Tunisia	Zambia	1–0	1–0	Friendly
3	4 June 2008	Tamale Stadium, Tamale, Ghana	Cameroon	2–2	2–3	2008 Africa Cup of Nations
4	8 June 2013	Stade Mustapha Ben Jannet, Monastir, Tunisia	Botswana	2–1	2–1	2015 Africa Cup of Nations qualification
5	19 November 2014	Stade Mustapha Ben Jannet, Monastir, Tunisia	Egypt	1–1	2–1	2015 Africa Cup of Nations qualification
6	22 January 2015	Estadio de Ebibeyin, Ebibeyin, Equatorial Guinea	Zambia	1–1	2–1	2015 Africa Cup of Nations
7	12 June 2015	Stade Olympique de Radès, Radès, Tunisia	Djibouti	1–0	8–1	2017 Africa Cup of Nations qualification
8	12 June 2015	Stade Olympique de Radès, Radès, Tunisia	Djibouti	2–0	8–1	2017 Africa Cup of Nations qualification
9	12 June 2015	Stade Olympique de Radès, Radès, Tunisia	Djibouti	3–0	8–1	2017 Africa Cup of Nations qualification
10	17 November 2015	Stade Olympique de Radès, Radès, Tunisia	Mauritania	2–1	2–1	2018 FIFA World Cup qualification

== Honours ==
Étoile du Sahel

- Tunisian Ligue Professionnelle 1: 2006–07

FC Zürich

- Swiss Super League: 2008–09

Individual

- Tunisian Footballer of the Year: 2014
- Swiss Super League Team of the Year: 2014–15

== Personal life ==
Yassine is a practicing Muslim and was known to hold a prayer rug with him whenever he goes with the team.
