= Bobby Ladner =

American football coach

Playing career
- 2000–2003: Belhaven

Coaching career (HC unless noted)
- 2004–2009: Olivet Nazarene (assistant)
- 2010–2011: Concordia (AL) (assistant)
- 2012–2014: Anderson (IN)

Head coaching record
- Overall: 2–28

Bobby Ladner is an American football coach and former player. He served as the head football coach at Anderson University in Anderson, Indiana from 2012 to 2014, compiling a record of 2–28. Ladner resigned from his post at Anderson following the 2014 season. Prior to his stint at Anderson, Ladner was an assistant football coach at Olivet Nazarene University and Concordia College Alabama. He played college football at Belhaven University.

== Head coaching record ==
Year	Team	Overall	Conference	Standing	Bowl/playoffs
Anderson Ravens (Heartland Collegiate Athletic Conference) (2012–2014)
2012	Anderson	0–10	0–8	9th	
2013	Anderson	0–10	0–8	9th	
2014	Anderson	2–8	2–6	T–7th	
Anderson:		2–28	2–22		
Total:		2–28			
