= Luca Ladner =

Swiss footballer (born 1989)

Personal information
- Date of birth: 26 April 1989 (age 37)
- Place of birth: Zürich, Switzerland
- Height: 1.82 m (6 ft 0 in)
- Position: Midfielder

Youth career
- 1996–2001: FC Engstringen
- 2001–2007: Grasshopper
- 2007–2009: Zürich

Senior career*
Years	Team	Apps	(Gls)
2006–2007	Grasshopper II	16	(6)
2007–2011	Zürich II	57	(6)
2007–2011	Zürich	6	(0)
2009	→ Wohlen (loan)	23	(0)
2010–2011	→ Schaffhausen (loan)	16	(2)
2011–2023	Baden	269	(35)

International career
2007	Switzerland U-17	5	(0)
2007–2008	Switzerland U-19	4	(0)
- * Club domestic league appearances and goals

Luca Ladner (born 26 April 1989) is a former footballer from Switzerland who played as midfielder.

== Career ==
Ladner began his career 1996 at FC Engstringen where he played for five years before joining Grasshopper in March 2001. After six years with Grasshopper he joined city rivals Zürich in July 2007. He won his first appearance in the AXPO Super League on 23 July 2008 in a match against Lucerne.

After having played 20 matches (2 goals) in the reserve team, Ladner joined FC Wohlen on 28 January 2009 on a loan spell until the end of the season. He is expected to rejoin parent club FC Zürich on 1 July 2009.

== International ==
He used to be a national player for Switzerland at youth level.

== Privates ==
Luca is the son of FC Zürich's assistant manager and former professional player Andy Ladner.
